= 2015–16 Athletic Bilbao season =

Athletic Bilbao
2015–16 season
- President: Josu Urrutia
- Head coach: Ernesto Valverde
- Stadium: San Mamés
- La Liga: 5th
- Copa del Rey: Quarter-finals
- UEFA Europa League: Quarter-finals
- Supercopa de España: Winners
- Top goalscorer: League: Aritz Aduriz (20); All: Aritz Aduriz (36)
- Highest home attendance: 47,785 (vs Real Sociedad, 21 February 2016)
- Lowest home attendance: 19,871 (vs Linense, 16 December 2015)
Home colours	Away colours	Third colours

The 2015–16 season was the 117th in Athletic Club's history and the 85th in the top tier. On 17 August 2015, Athletic defeated Barcelona 5–1 on aggregate to win the Supercopa de España, the club's first silverware since 1984.

== Squad ==
According to the official website. Sabin Merino wore number 25 in domestic matches.

=== Player statistics ===
S	P	N	Name	Super Cup				League				Cup				Europe				Total			
S	P	N	Name	A	S	G	M	A	S	G	M	A	S	G	M	A	S	G	M	A	S	G	M
1	GK	(Spain)	Gorka Iraizoz (vc)	2	0	0	180	37	0	0	3244	0	0	0	0	0	0	0	0	39	0	0	3424
2	DF	(Spain)	Eneko Bóveda	1	1	0	96	15	8	0	1462	2	1	0	183	7	2	0	620	25	12	0	2361
3	DF	(Spain)	Gorka Elustondo	0	1	0	22	4	7	1	465	1	0	0	90	4	6	2	398	9	14	3	975
4	DF	(France)	Aymeric Laporte	2	0	0	180	25	1	3	2213	5	0	2	450	12	0	0	1080	44	1	5	3923
5	MF	(Spain)	Javier Eraso	2	0	0	166	8	8	2	778	5	0	1	396	8	1	2	610	23	9	4	1950
6	MF	(Spain)	Mikel San José	1	0	1	90	30	4	2	2691	2	4	0	234	10	0	1	893	43	8	4	3908
7	MF	(Spain)	Beñat Etxebarria	2	0	0	172	31	4	1	2900	3	2	0	303	11	1	2	1023	47	7	3	4398
8	MF	(Spain)	Ander Iturraspe	0	0	0	0	7	9	0	700	4	0	0	337	4	4	0	392	15	13	0	1429
10	DF	(Spain)	Óscar de Marcos	2	0	0	180	33	1	1	2886	4	1	1	363	11	2	0	1055	50	4	2	4484
11	FW	(Spain)	Ibai Gómez	0	0	0	0	1	4	0	115	0	0	0	0	3	1	0	228	4	5	0	343
13	GK	(Spain)	Iago Herrerín	0	0	0	0	1	1	0	174	6	0	0	540	16	0	0	1470	23	1	0	2184
14	FW	(Spain)	Markel Susaeta (3rd c)	2	0	0	174	22	6	3	1920	4	0	0	272	11	2	2	1040	39	8	5	3406
15	FW	(Spain)	Iñaki Williams	0	0	0	0	20	5	8	1638	5	0	3	417	4	3	2	374	29	8	13	2429
16	DF	(Spain)	Xabier Etxeita	2	0	0	158	28	2	0	2485	4	0	1	360	11	0	0	1020	45	2	1	4023
17	MF	(Spain)	Mikel Rico	0	1	0	7	8	9	1	691	2	1	1	177	4	5	0	431	14	16	2	1306
18	MF	(Spain)	Carlos Gurpegi (c)	1	1	0	104	12	3	0	1143	1	0	0	90	6	1	0	550	20	5	0	1887
19	MF	(Spain)	Iker Muniain	0	0	0	0	13	7	2	1020	1	2	0	106	3	2	0	239	17	11	2	1365
20	FW	(Spain)	Aritz Aduriz	2	0	4	169	30	4	20	2776	4	1	2	364	13	1	10	1177	49	6	36	4486
21	FW	(Spain)	Borja Viguera	0	0	0	0	3	6	0	289	1	0	0	90	2	4	0	240	6	10	0	619
22	MF	(Spain)	Raúl García	0	0	0	0	27	3	7	2384	2	0	1	158	7	2	3	671	36	5	11	3213
24	DF	(Spain)	Mikel Balenziaga	2	0	0	180	33	1	0	2906	3	1	0	273	11	0	0	1005	49	2	0	4364
25	DF	(Spain)	Enric Saborit	0	0	0	0	0	0	0	0	0	0	0	0	1	0	0	90	1	0	0	90
27	FW	(Spain)	Sabin Merino	1	0	0	66	13	9	5	1129	2	2	0	224	5	6	2	540	21	17	7	1959
30	DF	(Spain)	Iñigo Lekue	0	1	0	24	12	8	1	1157	4	1	0	375	6	2	0	514	22	12	1	2070
Players moved to reserve team or on loan in winter transfer window
9	FW	(Spain)	Kike Sola	0	1	0	5	1	4	0	74	1	1	2	121	3	0	2	230	5	6	4	430
23	MF	(Spain)	Ager Aketxe	0	0	0	0	2	1	0	186	0	1	0	17	3	3	0	283	5	5	0	486

=== Disciplinary record ===
S	P	N	Name	Super Cup			League			Cup			Europe			Total		
S	P	N	Name	Yellow card	Yellow-red card	Red card	Yellow card	Yellow-red card	Red card	Yellow card	Yellow-red card	Red card	Yellow card	Yellow-red card	Red card	Yellow card	Yellow-red card	Red card
1	GK	(Spain)	Gorka Iraizoz	0	0	0	1	0	1	0	0	0	1	0	0	2	0	1
2	DF	(Spain)	Eneko Bóveda	1	0	0	1	0	0	0	0	0	1	0	0	3	0	0
3	DF	(Spain)	Gorka Elustondo	0	0	0	1	0	0	0	0	0	1	0	0	2	0	0
4	DF	(France)	Aymeric Laporte	0	0	0	7	1	1	1	0	0	2	0	0	10	1	1
5	MF	(Spain)	Javier Eraso	2	0	0	2	0	0	0	0	0	1	0	0	5	0	0
6	MF	(Spain)	Mikel San José	1	0	0	6	0	1	1	0	0	2	0	0	10	0	1
7	MF	(Spain)	Beñat Etxebarria	2	0	0	8	0	0	0	0	0	4	0	0	14	0	0
8	MF	(Spain)	Ander Iturraspe	0	0	0	1	0	0	1	0	0	1	0	0	3	0	0
10	DF	(Spain)	Óscar de Marcos	0	0	0	6	0	0	1	0	0	3	0	0	10	0	0
11	FW	(Spain)	Ibai Gómez	0	0	0	3	0	0	0	0	0	0	0	0	3	0	0
13	GK	(Spain)	Iago Herrerín	0	0	0	0	0	0	0	0	0	0	0	0	0	0	0
14	FW	(Spain)	Markel Susaeta	1	0	0	3	0	0	1	0	0	0	0	0	5	0	0
15	FW	(Spain)	Iñaki Williams	0	0	0	2	1	0	1	0	0	0	0	0	3	1	0
16	DF	(Spain)	Xabier Etxeita	1	0	0	5	0	0	2	0	0	1	0	0	9	0	0
17	MF	(Spain)	Mikel Rico	0	0	0	2	0	1	1	0	0	0	0	0	3	0	1
18	MF	(Spain)	Carlos Gurpegi	1	0	0	4	0	0	0	0	0	1	0	0	6	0	0
19	MF	(Spain)	Iker Muniain	0	0	0	3	0	0	0	0	0	1	0	0	4	0	0
20	FW	(Spain)	Aritz Aduriz	1	0	0	9	0	0	1	0	0	1	0	0	12	0	0
21	FW	(Spain)	Borja Viguera	0	0	0	0	0	0	0	0	0	1	0	0	1	0	0
22	MF	(Spain)	Raúl García	0	0	0	10	0	0	1	0	0	3	0	0	14	0	0
24	DF	(Spain)	Mikel Balenziaga	0	0	0	6	0	0	1	0	0	4	0	0	11	0	0
25	DF	(Spain)	Enric Saborit	0	0	0	0	0	0	0	0	0	0	0	0	0	0	0
27	FW	(Spain)	Sabin Merino	0	0	0	1	0	0	1	0	0	1	0	0	3	0	0
30	DF	(Spain)	Iñigo Lekue	0	0	0	2	0	0	1	0	0	0	0	0	3	0	0
Players moved to reserve team or on loan in winter transfer window
9	FW	(Spain)	Kike Sola	0	0	1	0	0	0	0	0	0	0	0	0	0	0	1
23	MF	(Spain)	Ager Aketxe	0	0	0	0	0	0	0	0	0	1	0	0	1	0	0

=== From the youth system ===
Note: Flags indicate national team as defined under FIFA eligibility rules; some limited exceptions apply. Players may hold more than one non-FIFA nationality.

No.	Pos.	Nation	Player
25	DF	ESP	Enric Saborit
27	FW	ESP	Sabin Merino
30	DF	ESP	Iñigo Lekue

=== Transfer ===
In

Date	Name	Moving from	Fee
5 June 2015	(Spain) Eneko Bóveda	(Spain) Eibar	Free
5 June 2015	(Spain) Javier Eraso	(Spain) Leganés	Free
1 July 2015	(Spain) Gorka Elustondo	(Spain) Real Sociedad	Free
31 August 2015	(Spain) Raúl García	(Spain) Atlético Madrid	Undisclosed

Out

Date	Name	Moving to	Fee
15 June 2015	(Spain) Andoni Iraola	(United States) New York City	Free
8 July 2015	(Spain) Unai Bustinza	(Spain) Leganés	Loan
12 July 2015	(Spain) Unai Albizua	(Spain) Leganés	Free
14 July 2015	(Spain) Gaizka Toquero	(Spain) Alavés	Free
23 July 2015	(Spain) Erik Morán	(Spain) Zaragoza	Loan
13 August 2015	(Spain) Jon Aurtenetxe	(Spain) Tenerife	Loan
13 August 2015	(Spain) Guillermo Fernández	(Spain) Leganés	Loan
15 January 2016	(Spain) Kike Sola	(England) Middlesbrough	Loan

== Staff ==
According to the official website.

Position	Name
Head coach	Ernesto Valverde
Assistant coach	Jon Aspiazu
Technical coaches	Joseba Etxeberria, Alberto Iglesias
Physical coaches	José Antonio Pozanco, Xabier Clemente
Goalkeeper coach	Aitor Iru
Representative	Andoni Imaz
Doctors	Josean Lekue, Paco Angulo
Masseur	Juan Manuel Ipiña
Physiotherapists	Álvaro Campa, Beñat Azula, Isusko Ortuzar
Podiatrist	Kepa Galardi
Materials managers	Txetxu Gallego, Jon Eskalza, Iker López

== Pre-season and friendlies ==
For the second time in their history (117 years), Athletic played in the United States when they shut out Club Tijuana 2–0 in a preseason contest in Boise, Idaho on 18 July 2015. The team's first trip to the U.S. took place on 4 April 1967 in Chicago, when Athletic beat Red Star Belgrade 3–1, also in a friendly.

7 July 2015 Friendly	Txorierri	0–14	Athletic Bilbao	Sondika, Spain
19:00 CEST (UTC+02:00)		Report	Eraso 8', 17', 41'; Gurpegi 13'; Ibai 22'; Aketxe 47', 57', 75'; Viguera 51', 69'; Sola 77', 79', 88'; Susaeta 85'	Stadium: Basozabal; Referee: Xabier Gómez

11 July 2015 Friendly	Krasnodar	1–1	Athletic Bilbao	Bischofshofen, Austria
17:00 CEST (UTC+02:00)	Mamayev 69'	Report	Guillermo 48'	Stadium: Sportplatz Bischofshofen; Referee: Semiz Salihovic

14 July 2015 Friendly	Athletic Bilbao	2–3	Greuther Fürth	Leogang, Austria
15:00 CEST (UTC+02:00)	Aduriz 14'; Williams 22'	Report	Tripić 52'; Šukalo 87'; Maderer 88'	Stadium: Steinbergstadion; Referee: Bernd Hirschbichler

18 July 2015 Friendly	Athletic Bilbao	2–0	Club Tijuana	Boise, Idaho, USA
19:00 MDT (UTC−06:00)	Aduriz 3'; Beñat 23'	Report		Stadium: Albertsons; Referee: José Carlos

23 July 2015 Friendly	Real Betis	1–1	Athletic Bilbao	Arcos de la Frontera, Spain
20:15 CEST (UTC+02:00)	Cejudo 71'	Report	Sola 7'	Stadium: Antonio Barbadillo; Referee: Salvador Sánchez

25 July 2015 Friendly	Athletic Bilbao	1–1	Valladolid	Sestao, Spain
19:00 CEST (UTC+02:00)	Viguera 76' (pen.)	Report	Guzmán 74'	Stadium: Las Llanas; Referee: Jon González

2 August 2015 Friendly	Osasuna	2–0	Athletic Bilbao	Pamplona, Spain
19:00 CEST (UTC+02:00)	Nino 35'; Martínez 85'	Report		Stadium: El Sadar; Referee: Daniel Ocón

8 August 2015 Friendly	Inter Milan	2–0	Athletic Bilbao	Parma, Italy
21:00 CEST (UTC+02:00)	Jovetić 27'; Icardi 83'	Report		Stadium: Ennio Tardini; Referee: Fabrizio Pasqua

== Competitions ==
=== Overview ===
Competition	First match	Last match	Starting round	Final position	Record							
Competition	First match	Last match	Starting round	Final position	Pld	W	D	L	GF	GA	GD	Win %
La Liga	23 August 2015	14 May 2016	Matchday 1	5th	38	18	8	12	58	45	+13	47.37
Europa League	30 July 2015	14 April 2016	Third qualifying round	Quarter-finals	16	9	3	4	28	17	+11	56.25
Copa del Rey	2 December 2015	27 January 2016	Round of 32	Quarter-finals	6	4	0	2	14	7	+7	66.67
Supercopa de España	14 August 2015	17 August 2015	Final	Winners	2	1	1	0	5	1	+4	50.00
Total					62	32	12	18	105	70	+35	51.61

Source: Competitions

=== Supercopa de España ===
14 August 2015 First leg	Athletic Bilbao	4–0	Barcelona	Bilbao
22:00 CEST (UTC+02:00)	San José 13' (yellow card) 90+3'; Eraso (yellow card) 44'; Beñat (yellow card) 45'; Aduriz 53', 60', 67' (pen.); Etxeita (yellow card) 70'; Susaeta (yellow card) 74'; Gurpegi (yellow card) 88'	Report	Pedro (yellow card) 41'; Dani Alves (yellow card) 67'; Mascherano (yellow card) 80'; Iniesta (yellow card) 90+1'	Stadium: San Mamés; Attendance: 40,000; Referee: José González (Castile and Léon)

17 August 2015 Second leg	Barcelona	1–1 (1–5 agg.)	Athletic Bilbao	Barcelona
22:00 CEST (UTC+02:00)	Messi 43'; Pedro (yellow card) 45'; Piqué (red card) 56'; Mascherano (yellow card) 56'	Report	Bóveda (yellow card) 30'; Eraso (yellow card) 41'; Aduriz (yellow card) 59', (goal) 74'; Beñat (yellow card) 60'; Sola (red card) 86'	Stadium: Camp Nou; Attendance: 88,834; Referee: Carlos Velasco (Madrid)

=== La Liga ===
League table

Pos	Team	Pld	W	D	L	GF	GA	GD	Pts	Qualification or relegation
3	Atlético Madrid	38	28	4	6	63	18	+45	88	Qualification for the Champions League group stage
4	Villarreal	38	18	10	10	44	35	+9	64	Qualification for the Champions League play-off round
5	Athletic Bilbao	38	18	8	12	58	45	+13	62	Qualification for the Europa League group stage (Note: Since the winners of the 2015–16 Copa del Rey, Barcelona, qualified for European competition based on league position, the spot awarded to the cup winners (Europa League group stage) was passed to the sixth-placed team and the spot awarded to the sixth-placed team (Europa League third qualifying round) was passed to the seventh-placed team.)
6	Celta Vigo	38	17	9	12	51	59	−8	60	Qualification for the Europa League group stage
7	Sevilla	38	14	10	14	51	50	+1	52	Qualification for the Champions League group stage (Note: Sevilla qualified for the Champions League group stage by winning the 2015–16 UEFA Europa League. Based on their league position (7th), they would have received the spot above to enter the Europa League third qualifying round. This spot was vacated without replacement as per UEFA regulations.)

Source: La Liga, Soccerway
Rules for classification: 1) Points; 2) Head-to-head points; 3) Head-to-head goal difference; 4) Goal difference; 5) Goals scored; 6) Fair-play points; 7) Play-off.

==== Results summary ====
Overall								Home						Away					
Pld	W	D	L	GF	GA	GD	Pts	W	D	L	GF	GA	GD	W	D	L	GF	GA	GD
38	18	8	12	58	45	+13	62	11	4	4	35	17	+18	7	4	8	23	28	−5

Round by round

Round	1	2	3	4	5	6	7	8	9	10	11	12	13	14	15	16	17	18	19	20	21	22	23	24	25	26	27	28	29	30	31	32	33	34	35	36	37	38
Ground	H	A	H	A	H	A	H	A	H	A	H	A	A	H	A	H	A	H	A	A	H	A	H	A	H	A	H	A	H	A	H	H	A	H	A	H	A	H
Result	L	L	W	L	L	D	W	D	W	W	W	L	W	D	L	W	W	D	L	L	W	W	D	L	L	W	W	W	W	L	D	W	W	L	D	W	D	W
Position	17	20	10	13	15	17	13	14	12	8	8	9	7	7	9	7	7	6	8	9	8	6	6	7	8	7	7	6	6	7	6	6	5	5	6	5	6	5

==== Matches ====
23 August 2015 1	Athletic Bilbao	0–1	Barcelona	Bilbao
18:30 CEST (UTC+02:00)	Elustondo (yellow card) 34'; Eraso (yellow card) 37'; Ibai (yellow card) 71'	Report	Rakitić (yellow card) 44'; Suárez 54' (yellow card) 75'; Vermaelen (yellow card) 64'	Stadium: San Mamés; Attendance: 44,772; Referee: Carlos del Cerro (Madrid)

30 August 2015 2	Eibar	2–0	Athletic Bilbao	Eibar
18:30 CEST (UTC+02:00)	Saúl 34' (pen.); Adrián 61'; Escalante (yellow card) 74'; Mauro (yellow card) 77'	Report	Ibai (yellow card) 2'; Laporte (yellow card) 33'	Stadium: Ipurua; Attendance: 5,511; Referee: David Fernández (Andalusia)

13 September 2015 3	Athletic Bilbao	3–1	Getafe	Bilbao
16:00 CEST (UTC+02:00)	Aduriz 6', 83'; García 24'; San José (yellow card) 72'	Report	Lafita (yellow card) 48'; Velázquez 70' (yellow card) 83'; Lago (yellow card) 77'; Alexis (yellow card) 83'	Stadium: San Mamés; Attendance: 39,107; Referee: Pedro Pérez (Andalusia)

20 September 2015 4	Villarreal	3–1	Athletic Bilbao	Villarreal
18:15 CEST (UTC+02:00)	Bruno (yellow card) 24' (goal) 43' (pen.); Baptistão (yellow card) 45+3' (goal) 80'; Nahuel (yellow card) 50'; Bailly (yellow card) 60'; Mario 67'	Report	Laporte (yellow card) 11'; Gurpegi (yellow card) 49'; Aduriz (yellow card) 64' (goal) 90+2'; De Marcos (yellow card) 88'	Stadium: El Madrigal; Attendance: 18,165; Referee: Carlos Clos (Aragon)

23 September 2015 5	Athletic Bilbao	1–2	Real Madrid	Bilbao
21:00 CEST (UTC+02:00)	Beñat (yellow card) 64'; De Marcos (yellow card) 66'; Sabin 67'; Ibai (yellow card) 81'; García (yellow card) 90'	Report	Benzema 19', 70'; Ronaldo (yellow card) 52'; Pepe (yellow card) 57'; Kroos (yellow card) 78'	Stadium: San Mamés; Attendance: 43,487; Referee: Antonio Mateu (Valencia)

27 September 2015 6	Real Sociedad	0–0	Athletic Bilbao	San Sebastián
20:30 CEST (UTC+02:00)	Illarramendi (yellow card) 8'; Pardo (yellow card) 52'; I. Martínez (yellow card) 70'	Report	Beñat (yellow card) 37'; García (yellow card) 68'; Williams (yellow card) 75'; Etxeita (yellow card) 82'	Stadium: Anoeta; Attendance: 26,114; Referee: Carlos Velasco (Madrid)

4 October 2015 7	Athletic Bilbao	3–1	Valencia	Bilbao
16:00 CEST (UTC+02:00)	Laporte 34'; Susaeta 60'; Aduriz 69'	Report	Parejo 20' (yellow card) 33'; Cancelo (yellow card) 58'; Feghouli (yellow card) 58'; Orbán (yellow card) 67'	Stadium: San Mamés; Attendance: 41,508; Referee: Xavier Estrada (Catalonia)

18 October 2015 8	Deportivo La Coruña	2–2	Athletic Bilbao	A Coruña
20:30 CEST (UTC+02:00)	Lucas (yellow card) 62' (goal) 80'; Sidnei (yellow card) 85'; Arribas 89'	Report	Williams 30'; Aduriz 63'; Laporte (yellow card) 65'; Beñat (yellow card) 75'	Stadium: Riazor; Attendance: 25,239; Referee: Santiago Jaime (Aragon)

26 October 2015 9	Athletic Bilbao	3–0	Sporting Gijón	Bilbao
20:30 CET (UTC+01:00)	Susaeta 29'; Aduriz 42', 67' (yellow card) 76'	Report	Halilović (yellow card) 14'; Mascarell (yellow card) 23'; Cases (yellow card) 61'	Stadium: San Mamés; Attendance: 40,477; Referee: Ignacio Iglesias (Galicia)

1 November 2015 10	Real Betis	1–3	Athletic Bilbao	Seville
20:30 CET (UTC+01:00)	Ceballos (yellow card) 31'; Castro 67' (pen.); Bruno (yellow card) 75'	Report	Williams 8', 45'; García (yellow card) 12' (goal) 87'; San José (yellow card) 23'; Laporte (yellow card) 33'; Etxeita (yellow card) 65'	Stadium: Benito Villamarín; Attendance: 24,879; Referee: José González (Castile and Léon)

8 November 2015 11	Athletic Bilbao	2–1	Espanyol	Bilbao
12:00 CET (UTC+01:00)	Williams 8'; Gurpegi (yellow card) 56'; García 64'; Beñat (yellow card) 73'	Report	Álvarez (yellow card) 10'; Pérez 51'; Diop (yellow card) 56'; Caicedo (yellow card) 56'; Fuentes (yellow card) 60'; López (yellow card) 86'; Sylla (yellow card) 90+3'	Stadium: San Mamés; Attendance: 42,204; Referee: Alberto Undiano (Navarre)

22 November 2016 12	Granada	2–0	Athletic Bilbao	Granada
18:15 CET (UTC+01:00)	Laporte 5' (o.g.); Peñaranda (yellow card) 6'; Robert (yellow card) 59'; Success 59' (yellow card) 60'; Pérez (yellow card) 86'; Fernández (yellow card) 90+1'	Report	Susaeta (yellow card) 23'; Aduriz (yellow card) 24'; Etxeita (yellow card) 36'	Stadium: Nuevo Los Cármenes; Attendance: 13,031; Referee: Carlos del Cerro (Madrid)

29 November 2015 13	Rayo Vallecano	0–3	Athletic Bilbao	Madrid
18:15 CET (UTC+01:00)	Baena (yellow card) 17'; Trashorras (yellow card) 26'; Nacho (yellow card) 59'; Tito (yellow card) 90+2'	Report	Aduriz 1', 24' (pen.), 60'; Laporte (red card) 64'	Stadium: Vallecas; Attendance: 13,100; Referee: Alejandro Hernández (Canary Islands)

6 December 2015 14	Athletic Bilbao	0–0	Málaga	Bilbao
20:30 CET (UTC+01:00)	San José (red card) 19'; García (yellow card) 19'; Williams (yellow card) 19'	Report	Filipenko (yellow card) 12'; Amrabat (yellow card) 53'; Recio (yellow card) 77'	Stadium: San Mamés; Attendance: 41,835; Referee: Alfonso Álvarez (Catalonia)

13 December 2015 15	Atlético Madrid	2–1	Athletic Bilbao	Madrid
18:15 CET (UTC+01:00)	Saúl 45+2'; Griezmann 67'; Gabi (yellow card) 85'	Report	Laporte 27'; Aduriz (yellow card) 74'	Stadium: Vicente Calderón; Attendance: 44,417; Referee: Juan Martínez Munuera (Valencia)

20 December 2015 16	Athletic Bilbao	2–0	Levante	Bilbao
18:15 CET (UTC+01:00)	San José 55'; Williams 82'	Report	Toño (yellow card) 37'; Simão (yellow card) 39'; Feddal (yellow card) 63'; P. López (yellow card) 74'; Lerma (yellow card) 90+1'	Stadium: San Mamés; Attendance: 39,471; Referee: Alejandro Hernández (Canary Islands)

30 December 2015 17	Celta Vigo	0–1	Athletic Bilbao	Vigo
20:30 CET (UTC+01:00)	Cabral (yellow card) 65'; Bongonda (yellow card) 84'; Radoja (yellow card) 87'	Report	San José (yellow card) 24'; Laporte (yellow card) 52'; Beñat (yellow card) 69'; García 71'; Iraizoz (yellow card) 80'	Stadium: Balaídos; Attendance: 17,857; Referee: Pedro Pérez (Andalusia)

3 January 2016 18	Athletic Bilbao	2–2	Las Palmas	Bilbao
18:15 CET (UTC+01:00)	Aduriz 17' (pen.); Balenziaga (yellow card) 43'; Iturraspe (yellow card) 59'; Williams 66'; De Marcos (yellow card) 80'	Report	García (yellow card) 16'; Gómez (yellow card) 22' (goal) 62'; Tana 81'; Aythami (yellow card) 84'; El Zhar (yellow card) 88'	Stadium: San Mamés; Attendance: 41,562; Referee: Carlos del Cerro (Madrid)

9 January 2016 19	Sevilla	2–0	Athletic Bilbao	Seville
18:15 CET (UTC+01:00)	Gameiro 24', 59' (pen.); Vitolo (yellow card) 54'; Krohn-Dehli (yellow card) 89'	Report	Aduriz (yellow card) 52'; Laporte (yellow card) 57'; Balenziaga (yellow card) 77'	Stadium: Ramón Sánchez Pizjuán; Attendance: 35,421; Referee: Eduardo Prieto (Navarre)

17 January 2016 20	Barcelona	6–0	Athletic Bilbao	Barcelona
20:30 CET (UTC+01:00)	Messi 7' (pen.); Neymar 31'; Suárez 47', 68', 82'; Mascherano (yellow card) 51'; Rakitić 62'; Piqué (yellow card) 87'	Report	Iraizoz (red card) 4'; De Marcos (yellow card) 69'; Eraso (yellow card) 85'	Stadium: Camp Nou; Attendance: 66,324; Referee: Antonio Mateu (Valencia)

24 January 2016 21	Athletic Bilbao	5–2	Eibar	Bilbao
12:00 CET (UTC+01:00)	Aduriz 12', 52'; Sabin 27'; Laporte 40' (yellow card) 49'; Susaeta (yellow card) 75'; Mauro 80' (o.g.)	Report	Borja 4', 50' (pen.); Escalante (yellow card) 59'; Keko (yellow card) 74'	Stadium: San Mamés; Attendance: 43,750; Referee: Jesús Gil (Extremadura)

30 January 2016 22	Getafe	0–1	Athletic Bilbao	Getafe
18:15 CET (UTC+01:00)	Cala (yellow card) 28' (yellow-red card) 90+2'; Lago (yellow card) 29'; Velázquez (yellow card) 76'	Report	Williams 24'; Etxeita (yellow card) 61'; De Marcos (yellow card) 72'; Balenziaga (yellow card) 79'; San José (yellow card) 79'; Beñat (yellow card) 90'	Stadium: Coliseum Alfonso Pérez; Attendance: 9,431; Referee: Xavier Estrada (Catalonia)

6 February 2016 23	Athletic Bilbao	0–0	Villarreal	Bilbao
20:30 CET (UTC+01:00)	Williams (yellow card) 29' (yellow-red card) 90'; San José (yellow card) 41'; Lekue (yellow card) 60'; Sabin (yellow card) 67'; Muniain (yellow card) 90'	Report	Costa (yellow card) 27'; Bakambu (yellow card) 40'; Soldado (yellow card) 75'; Ruiz (yellow card) 76'; Bonera (yellow card) 77' (yellow-red card) 90+4'	Stadium: San Mamés; Attendance: 41,101; Referee: Mario Melero (Andalusia)

13 February 2016 24	Real Madrid	4–2	Athletic Bilbao	Madrid
16:00 CET (UTC+01:00)	Ronaldo 3', 87'; Varane (yellow card) 16' (yellow-red card) 83'; James 37'; Kroos 45'; Modrić (yellow card) 71'	Report	Eraso 10'; Etxeita (yellow card) 14'; Balenziaga (yellow card) 43'; Elustondo 90'	Stadium: Santiago Bernabéu; Attendance: 70,100; Referee: Alfonso Álvarez (Catalonia)

21 February 2016 25	Athletic Bilbao	0–1	Real Sociedad	Bilbao
18:15 CET (UTC+01:00)	Susaeta (yellow card) 5'; San José (yellow card) 28'; García (yellow card) 64'; Muniain (yellow card) 65'; Aduriz (yellow card) 65'; Beñat (yellow card) 90'; De Marcos (yellow card) 90+3'	Report	Illarramendi (yellow card) 13'; Reyes (yellow card) 13'; Jonathas 17' (yellow card) 19'; Vela (yellow card) 53'; Elustondo (yellow card) 87'; Rulli (yellow card) 90+4'	Stadium: San Mamés; Attendance: 47,785; Referee: José Sánchez (Murcia)

28 February 2016 26	Valencia	0–3	Athletic Bilbao	Valencia
16:00 CET (UTC+01:00)	Gomes (yellow card) 43'; Cancelo (yellow card) 54'	Report	Sabin 73'; Muniain 77'; Aduriz 80'	Stadium: Mestalla; Attendance: 36,654; Referee: Jesús Gil (Extremadura)

2 March 2016 27	Athletic Bilbao	4–1	Deportivo La Coruña	Bilbao
20:00 CET (UTC+01:00)	Muniain 13'; Aduriz (yellow card) 18' (goal) 36', 53', 60'	Report	Mosquera (yellow card) 17'; Borges (yellow card) 22'; Riera 51'; Lopo (yellow card) 59'	Stadium: San Mamés; Attendance: 37,552; Referee: Antonio Mateu (Valencia)

6 March 2016 28	Sporting Gijón	0–2	Athletic Bilbao	Gijón
18:15 CET (UTC+01:00)	Vranješ (yellow card) 26'	Report	Beñat 27'; Laporte (yellow card) 52' (yellow-red card) 74'; De Marcos 59'; Balenziaga (yellow card) 90+2'	Stadium: El Molinón; Attendance: 23,227; Referee: Carlos del Cerro (Madrid)

13 March 2016 29	Athletic Bilbao	3–1	Real Betis	Bilbao
18:15 CET (UTC+01:00)	García (yellow card) 20'; Sabin 34', 50'; Rico 44'	Report	Castro 85'	Stadium: San Mamés; Attendance: 42,563; Referee: Santiago Jaime (Aragon)

20 March 2016 30	Espanyol	2–1	Athletic Bilbao	Cornellà de Llobregat
12:00 CET (UTC+01:00)	Diop 54'; Caicedo 57'; Álvaro (yellow card) 60'; Pérez (yellow card) 86'; Pau (yellow card) 90+3'	Report	Eraso 20'; Rico (yellow card) 47'; Lekue (yellow card) 84'; Beñat (yellow card) 90+6'	Stadium: Cornellà-El Prat; Attendance: 18,340; Referee: Eduardo Prieto (Navarre)

3 April 2016 31	Athletic Bilbao	1–1	Granada	Bilbao
12:00 CEST (UTC+02:00)	Aduriz (yellow card) 17'; Lekue 28'; Gurpegi (yellow card) 48'	Report	Foulquier (yellow card) 26'; Pérez (yellow card) 41'; Lombán (yellow card) 44'; Peñaranda (yellow card) 46' (goal) 77'; Rico (yellow card) 86'	Stadium: San Mamés; Attendance: 40,680; Referee: Carlos Velasco (Madrid)

10 April 2016 32	Athletic Bilbao	1–0	Rayo Vallecano	Bilbao
20:30 CEST (UTC+02:00)	García (yellow card) 16'; Williams 61'	Report	Nacho (yellow card) 2'; Baena (yellow card) 16'; Castro (yellow card) 52'	Stadium: San Mamés; Attendance: 37,703; Referee: Jesús Gil (Extremadura)

17 April 2016 33	Málaga	0–1	Athletic Bilbao	Málaga
12:00 CEST (UTC+02:00)	Recio (yellow card) 26'; Torres (yellow card) 33'; Weligton (yellow card) 60'	Report	Muniain (yellow card) 26'; García 53' (yellow card) 80'; Bóveda (yellow card) 57'; Gurpegi (yellow card) 66'; Rico (yellow card) 84'	Stadium: La Rosaleda; Attendance: 25,158; Referee: José Sánchez (Murcia)

20 April 2016 34	Athletic Bilbao	0–1	Atlético Madrid	Bilbao
20:45 CEST (UTC+02:00)		Report	Torres 38'	Stadium: San Mamés; Attendance: 44,687; Referee: Juan Martínez Munuera (Valencia)

24 April 2016 35	Levante	2–2	Athletic Bilbao	Valencia
12:00 CEST (UTC+02:00)	Víctor 13'; Lerma (yellow card) 36'; Etxeita 68' (o.g.); Juanfran (yellow card) 74'	Report	Balenziaga (yellow card) 71'; Susaeta 88'; San José 90+1'	Stadium: Ciutat de València; Attendance: 14,409; Referee: Ignacio Iglesias (Galicia)

1 May 2016 36	Athletic Bilbao	2–1	Celta Vigo	Bilbao
12:00 CEST (UTC+02:00)	Aduriz 38' (pen.); García (yellow card) 45+1' (goal) 72'	Report	Orellana 13' (yellow card) 42'; Díaz (yellow card) 28'; Cabral (yellow card) 37' (red card) 40'; Nolito (yellow card) 82'; Hernández (yellow card) 90'	Stadium: San Mamés; Attendance: 42,654; Referee: Xavier Estrada (Catalonia)

8 May 2016 37	Las Palmas	0–0	Athletic Bilbao	Las Palmas
16:00 WEST (UTC+01:00)	Momo (yellow card) 85'	Report	Aduriz (yellow card) 89'	Stadium: Gran Canaria; Attendance: 27,349; Referee: Pedro Pérez (Andalusia)

14 May 2016 38	Athletic Bilbao	3–1	Sevilla	Bilbao
19:30 CEST (UTC+02:00)	García (yellow card) 5' (goal) 71'; Aduriz 11', 31'; Rico (red card) 90'	Report	Coke (red card) 34'; Cristóforo (yellow card) 39'; Muñoz 55'; Kolodziejczak (red card) 58'; Curro (yellow card) 60'	Stadium: San Mamés; Attendance: 44,280; Referee: Alfonso Álvarez (Catalonia)

=== Copa del Rey ===
Round of 32

3 December 2015 First leg	Linense	0–2	Athletic Bilbao	La Línea
20:00 CET (UTC+01:00)		Report	Sola 13'; Laporte 19'	Stadium: Municipal; Attendance: 9,000; Referee: Carlos Velasco (Madrid)

16 December 2015 Second leg	Athletic Bilbao	6–0 (8–0 agg.)	Linense	Bilbao
20:00 CET (UTC+01:00)	De Marcos 9'; Eraso 49'; Etxeita 56'; Sola 62'; García 67'; Rico 89'	Report		Stadium: San Mamés; Attendance: 19,871; Referee: Xavier Estrada (Catalonia)

Round of 16

6 January 2016 First leg	Athletic Bilbao	3–2	Villarreal	Bilbao
12:00 CET (UTC+01:00)	García (yellow card) 17'; Susaeta (yellow card) 50'; Williams 54'; Aduriz 68'; Laporte 81'	Report	Baptistão 16'; Marín (yellow card) 33'; Samu 38'; Pina (yellow card) 45'; Mario (yellow card) 74' (yellow-red card) 87'	Stadium: San Mamés; Attendance: 36,599; Referee: Carlos Clos (Aragon)

13 January 2016 Second leg	Villarreal	0–1 (2–4 agg.)	Athletic Bilbao	Villarreal
20:30 CET (UTC+01:00)	Bailly (yellow card) 63'; Rukavina (yellow card) 82'; Marín (yellow card) 86'	Report	Williams 21' (yellow card) 71'; Etxeita (yellow card) 50'; Aduriz (yellow card) 59'	Stadium: El Madrigal; Attendance: 14,540; Referee: Carlos Velasco (Madrid)

Quarter-finals

20 January 2016 First leg	Athletic Bilbao	1–2	Barcelona	Bilbao
21:00 CET (UTC+01:00)	Laporte (yellow card) 54'; De Marcos (yellow card) 65'; Etxeita (yellow card) 67'; Sabin (yellow card) 76'; Iturraspe (yellow card) 77'; Aduriz 89'; San José (yellow card) 90+3'	Report	Munir 18'; Neymar 24'; Iniesta (yellow card) 39'; Mascherano (yellow card) 78'; Dani Alves (yellow card) 90'	Stadium: San Mamés; Attendance: 46,224; Referee: José González (Castile and Léon)

27 January 2016 Second leg	Barcelona	3–1 (5–2 agg.)	Athletic Bilbao	Barcelona
21:30 CET (UTC+01:00)	Suárez 53' (yellow card) 70'; Piqué 81'; Neymar 90+1'	Report	Williams 12'; Rico (yellow card) 19'; Balenziaga (yellow card) 39'; Lekue (yellow card) 52'	Stadium: Camp Nou; Attendance: 63,405; Referee: Alejandro Hernández (Canary Islands)

=== UEFA Europa League ===
==== Qualifying phase ====
Third qualifying round

30 July 2015 First leg	Athletic Bilbao (Spain)	2–0	(Azerbaijan) Inter Baku	Bilbao, Spain
20:45 CEST (UTC+02:00)	Eraso 12', 49'	Report	Kvekveskiri (yellow card) 62'	Stadium: San Mamés; Attendance: 32,823; Referee: Stavros Tritsonis (Greece)

6 August 2015 Second leg	Inter Baku (Azerbaijan)	0–0 (0–2 agg.)	(Spain) Athletic Bilbao	Baku, Azerbaijan
21:00 AZST (UTC+05:00)	Seyidov (yellow card) 55'	Report	Balenziaga (yellow card) 25'	Stadium: Inter Arena; Attendance: 4,000; Referee: Serdar Gözübüyük (Netherlands)

Play-off round

20 August 2015 First leg	Žilina (Slovakia)	3–2	(Spain) Athletic Bilbao	Žilina, Slovakia
20:15 CEST (UTC+02:00)	Čmelík (yellow card) 50'; Paur 66'; William 77', 90+4' (yellow card) 90+4'	Report	Sabin 16'; Sola 33'	Stadium: Pod Dubňom; Attendance: 10,175; Referee: Ovidiu Hațegan (Romania)

27 August 2015 Second leg	Athletic Bilbao (Spain)	1–0 ((a) 3–3 agg.)	(Slovakia) Žilina	Bilbao, Spain
20:45 CEST (UTC+02:00)	Elustondo 24'; Beñat (yellow card) 68'; Eraso (yellow card) 70'; Aketxe (yellow card) 90+2'	Report		Stadium: San Mamés; Attendance: 38,688; Referee: Martin Strömbergsson (Sweden)

==== Group stage ====
Pos	Team	Pld	W	D	L	GF	GA	GD	Pts	Qualification
1	(Spain) Athletic Bilbao	6	4	1	1	16	8	+8	13	Advance to knockout phase
2	(Germany) FC Augsburg	6	3	0	3	12	11	+1	9	Advance to knockout phase
3	(Serbia) Partizan	6	3	0	3	10	14	−4	9	
4	(Netherlands) AZ	6	1	1	4	8	13	−5	4	

Source: Soccerway
Rules for classification: Group stage tiebreakers

17 September 2015 1	Athletic Bilbao (Spain)	3–1	(Germany) Augsburg	Bilbao, Spain
21:05 CEST (UTC+02:00)	Aduriz 55', 66'; García (yellow card) 57'; Beñat (yellow card) 74'; Susaeta 90'	Report	Altıntop 15'; Werner (yellow card) 72'	Stadium: San Mamés; Attendance: 37,838; Referee: Vladislav Bezborodov (Russia)

1 October 2015 2	AZ (Netherlands)	2–1	(Spain) Athletic Bilbao	Alkmaar, Netherlands
19:00 CEST (UTC+02:00)	Johansson (yellow card) 47'; Henriksen 55'; Bóveda 65' (o.g.); Coutinho (yellow card) 90'	Report	Gurpegi (yellow card) 50'; Iturraspe (yellow card) 53'; García (yellow card) 71'; Aduriz 75'	Stadium: AFAS; Attendance: 11,434; Referee: Ivan Kružliak (Slovakia)

22 October 2015 3	Partizan (Serbia)	0–2	(Spain) Athletic Bilbao	Belgrade, Serbia
19:00 CEST (UTC+02:00)	Lukić (yellow card) 62'; Ostojić (yellow card) 84'	Report	García 32'; Beñat (yellow card) 42' (goal) 85'; De Marcos (yellow card) 51'; Laporte (yellow card) 53'	Stadium: Partizan; Attendance: 11,128; Referee: Paweł Raczkowski (Poland)

5 November 2015 4	Athletic Bilbao (Spain)	5–1	(Serbia) Partizan	Bilbao, Spain
21:05 CET (UTC+01:00)	Williams 15', 19'; Beñat 40'; Aduriz 71'; Elustondo 81'	Report	Oumarou 17'; Ćirković (yellow card) 39'; Jevtović (yellow card) 49'; Fabrício (yellow card) 53'; Vulićević (yellow card) 55'; Šaponjić (yellow card) 61'	Stadium: San Mamés; Attendance: 39,849; Referee: Michael Koukoulakis (Greece)

26 November 2015 5	Augsburg (Germany)	2–3	(Spain) Athletic Bilbao	Augsburg, Germany
19:00 CET (UTC+01:00)	Trochowski 41'; Kohr (yellow card) 47'; Esswein (yellow card) 55'; Bobadilla 59'	Report	Susaeta 10'; Aduriz 83', 86'	Stadium: WWK Arena; Attendance: 23,741; Referee: Artur Dias (Portugal)

10 December 2015 6	Athletic Bilbao (Spain)	2–2	(Netherlands) AZ	Bilbao, Spain
21:05 CET (UTC+01:00)	Sola 43'; San José 47' (pen.); Sabin (yellow card) 77'	Report	Van Overeem 26'; Haye (yellow card) 55'; Gouweleeuw (yellow card) 63'; Janssen 88'	Stadium: San Mamés; Attendance: 29,483; Referee: Benoît Bastien (France)

==== Knockout phase ====
Round of 32

18 February 2016 First leg	Marseille (France)	0–1	(Spain) Athletic Bilbao	Marseille, France
21:05 CET (UTC+01:00)	Diarra (yellow card) 76'; Isla (yellow card) 89'	Report	Aduriz 54'; Beñat (yellow card) 60'; Balenziaga (yellow card) 82'; Elustondo (yellow card) 90+2'	Stadium: Vélodrome; Attendance: 29,727; Referee: Craig Thomson (Scotland)

25 February 2016 Second leg	Athletic Bilbao (Spain)	1–1 (2–1 agg.)	(France) Marseille	Bilbao, Spain
19:00 CET (UTC+01:00)	San José (yellow card) 38'; Aduriz (yellow card) 53'; Sabin 81'	Report	Nkoulou (yellow card) 34'; Mendy (yellow card) 38'; Batshuayi 40'; Nkoudou (yellow card) 75'; Diarra (yellow card) 90+3'	Stadium: San Mamés; Attendance: 38,259; Referee: Aleksei Kulbakov (Belarus)

Round of 16

10 March 2016 First leg	Athletic Bilbao (Spain)	1–0	(Spain) Valencia	Bilbao, Spain
21:05 CET (UTC+01:00)	García 20'	Report	Fuego (yellow card) 63'; Danilo (yellow card) 66'; Mustafi (yellow card) 71'	Stadium: San Mamés; Attendance: 35,765; Referee: Björn Kuipers (Netherlands)

17 March 2016 Second leg	Valencia (Spain)	2–1 (2–2 (a) agg.)	(Spain) Athletic Bilbao	Valencia, Spain
19:00 CET (UTC+01:00)	Mina 13' (yellow card) 40'; Santos 37'; Fuego (yellow card) 42'; Gomes (yellow card) 74'; Vezo (yellow card) 83'	Report	García (yellow card) 45+2'; Aduriz 76'; Laporte (yellow card) 77'	Stadium: Mestalla; Attendance: 31,681; Referee: Daniele Orsato (Italy)

Quarter-finals

7 April 2016 First leg	Athletic Bilbao (Spain)	1–2	(Spain) Sevilla	Bilbao, Spain
21:05 CEST (UTC+02:00)	Aduriz 48'; Balenziaga (yellow card) 51'; De Marcos (yellow card) 72'	Report	Kolodziejczak 56'; Rami (yellow card) 68'; Banega (yellow card) 70'; Iborra 83'; Vitolo (yellow card) 88'	Stadium: San Mamés; Attendance: 40,856; Referee: Mark Clattenburg (England)

14 April 2016 Second leg	Sevilla (Spain)	1–2 (a.e.t.) (3–3 agg.) (5–4 p)	(Spain) Athletic Bilbao	Sevilla, Spain
21:05 CEST (UTC+02:00)	Gameiro 59'; Rami (yellow card) 86'; Nzonzi (yellow card) 105+1'; Coke (yellow card) 114'; Konoplyanka (yellow card) 116'	Report	Bóveda (yellow card) 28'; Aduriz 57'; San José (yellow card) 65'; Balenziaga (yellow card) 74'; García 80'; Viguera (yellow card) 86'; Muniain (yellow card) 95'; Iraizoz (yellow card) 98'; De Marcos (yellow card) 102'; Etxeita (yellow card) 105+1'	Stadium: Ramón Sánchez Pizjuán; Attendance: 38,567; Referee: Damir Skomina (Slovenia)
	Penalties
	Coke (penalty scored); Krychowiak (penalty scored); Konoplyanka (penalty scored); Nzonzi (penalty scored); Gameiro (penalty scored)		(penalty scored) García; (penalty scored) Viguera; (penalty scored) San José; (penalty missed) Beñat; (penalty scored) Susaeta

== See also ==
- Athletic Bilbao in European football
