= Iñigo Lekue =

Spanish footballer (born 1993)

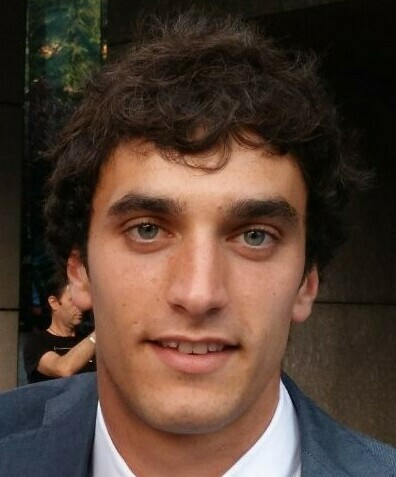
- Lekue in 2017

Personal information
- Full name: Iñigo Lekue Martínez
- Date of birth: 4 May 1993 (age 33)
- Place of birth: Bilbao, Spain
- Height: 1.80 m (5 ft 11 in)
- Position: Full-back

Youth career
- 2008–2012: Danok Bat

Senior career*
Years	Team	Apps	(Gls)
2012–2013	Basconia	34	(0)
2013–2015	Bilbao Athletic	60	(1)
2015–2026	Athletic Bilbao	212	(3)
Total		306	(4)

International career
2025	Basque Country	1	(0)
- * Club domestic league appearances and goals

Iñigo Lekue Martínez (Basque: [iɲiɣo lekue maɾtines̻]; Spanish: [ˈiɲiɣo ˈlekwe maɾˈtineθ]; born 4 May 1993) is a Spanish former professional footballer who played as a right or left-back.

Developed at Athletic Bilbao, he represented that club for 11 seasons, making 282 appearances while winning the Supercopa de España twice and also the 2023–24 Copa del Rey.

== Club career ==
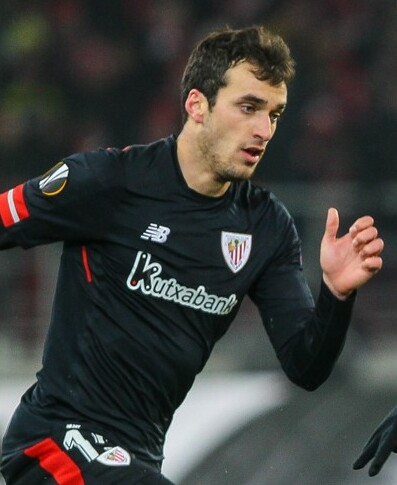
Lekue with Athletic Bilbao in 2018

Born in Bilbao, Basque Country, Lekue graduated from Danok Bat CF's youth system. In summer 2012 he moved to Athletic Bilbao, and made his debut as a senior with the farm team in the Tercera División.

On 21 June 2013, Lekue was promoted to the reserves in the Segunda División B. On 29 June 2015, after being an ever-present figure during the side's promotion to Segunda División after a 19-year absence, he was promoted to the main squad in La Liga.

Lekue made his official debut with the first team on 15 August 2015, coming on as a second-half substitute for fellow youth graduate Sabin Merino in a 4–0 home rout of FC Barcelona in the Supercopa de España. He made his first league appearance 15 days later, being taken off at half-time in a 2–0 loss at neighbouring SD Eibar.

Lekue scored his first senior goal on 21 December 2015, equalising for the reserves in a 1–1 home draw against CD Lugo. The following 3 April he scored for the first time in the top flight, opening a 1–1 draw with Granada CF at the San Mamés Stadium. On 8 June 2016, he agreed to a contract extension until 2019.

On 24 November 2016, Lekue netted his first European goal to win a UEFA Europa League group match 3–2 at home to US Sassuolo Calcio. In January 2018, he extended his contract to 2023. He missed most of the 2018–19 season with back issues, returning as a late substitute on 16 March in a 2–0 home win over Atlético Madrid.

Lekue played rarely under Gaizka Garitano, and looked for a new club in the January 2021 transfer window, but was reinstated by new manager Marcelino García Toral and won another Super Cup that month, again against Barcelona. That April, he was involved in two Copa del Rey finals in one month, losing both to Real Sociedad and Barcelona respectively; he took part in the latter 4–0 defeat as a half-time substitute.

In 2022–23, due to injuries to Yuri Berchiche and Mikel Balenziaga, Lekue featured frequently. In April, during his own recovery, he prolonged his contract to 2025.

Lekue made his 250th appearance for Athletic on 1 December 2024, in the 2–1 away victory against Rayo Vallecano. His 200th in the top division came the following 18 May, again as a starter, in the 1–0 win at Valencia CF.

On 11 May 2026, the 33-year-old Lekue announced his retirement at the end of the season. He played his last match 12 days later, a 4–2 loss away to Real Madrid.

== International career ==
On 22 May 2016, Lekue was called up to the Spain national team by manager Vicente del Bosque, after Jonny withdrew due to "personal reasons". He received his maiden callup to the Basque Country regional side for a friendly against Palestine on 15 November 2025; the 32-year-old then took part in the 3–0 win in Bilbao.

== Career statistics ==
Appearances and goals by club, season and competition
Club	Season	League			Copa del Rey		Continental		Other		Total	
Club	Season	Division	Apps	Goals	Apps	Goals	Apps	Goals	Apps	Goals	Apps	Goals
Basconia	2012–13	Tercera División	34	0	—		—		—		34	0
Bilbao Athletic	2013–14	Segunda División B	26	0	—		—		—		26	0
Bilbao Athletic	2014–15	Segunda División B	31	0	—		—		6 (Note: Appearances in Segunda División B play-offs)	0	37	0
Bilbao Athletic	2015–16	Segunda División	3	1	—		—		—		3	1
Bilbao Athletic	Total		60	1	0	0	0	0	6	0	66	1
Athletic Bilbao	2015–16	La Liga	20	1	5	0	8 (Note: Appearances in UEFA Europa League)	0	1 (Note: Appearances in Supercopa de España)	0	34	1
Athletic Bilbao	2016–17	La Liga	25	2	1	0	5	1	—		31	3
Athletic Bilbao	2017–18	La Liga	32	0	2	0	12	0	—		46	0
Athletic Bilbao	2018–19	La Liga	4	0	0	0	—		—		4	0
Athletic Bilbao	2019–20	La Liga	14	0	4	0	—		—		18	0
Athletic Bilbao	2020–21	La Liga	18	0	4	0	—		2	0	24	0
Athletic Bilbao	2021–22	La Liga	25	0	4	0	—		0	0	29	0
Athletic Bilbao	2022–23	La Liga	20	0	3	0	—		—		23	0
Athletic Bilbao	2023–24	La Liga	27	0	6	0	—		—		33	0
Athletic Bilbao	2024–25	La Liga	16	0	0	0	4	0	1	0	21	0
Athletic Bilbao	2025–26	La Liga	11	0	4	0	3 (Note: Appearances in UEFA Champions League)	0	1	0	19	0
Athletic Bilbao	Total		212	3	33	0	32	1	5	0	282	4
Career total			306	4	33	0	32	1	11	0	382	5

== Honours ==
Athletic Bilbao

- Copa del Rey: 2023–24; runner-up: 2019–20, 2020–21
- Supercopa de España: 2015, 2021

Individual

- La Liga Play of the Month: December 2023 (with Nico Williams)

== See also ==
- List of one-club men
