= 2015 Copa del Rey final =

Match on 30 May 2015 to decide the winner of the 2014–15 Copa del Rey

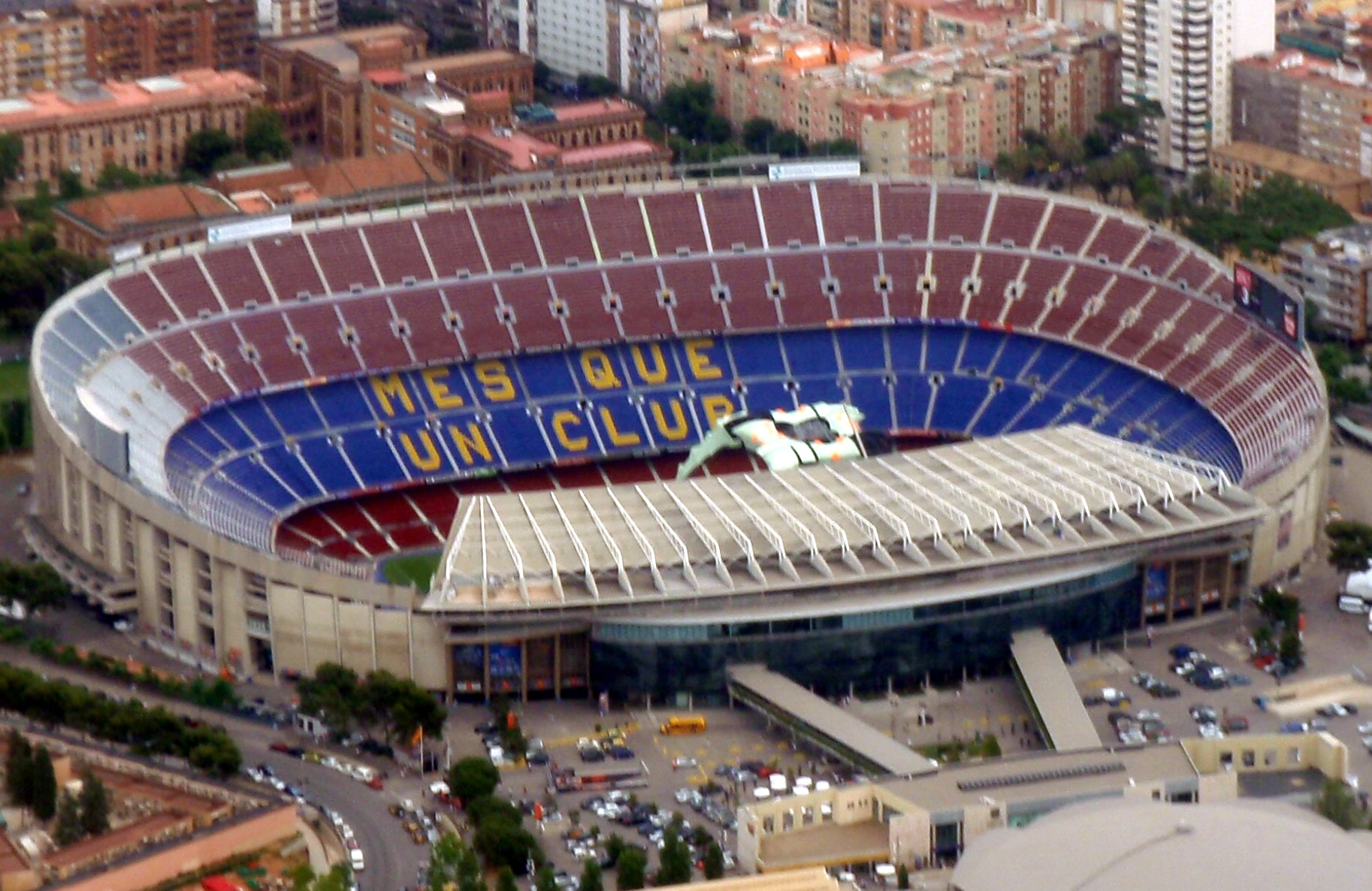
- Camp Nou in Barcelona hosted the final
- Event: 2014–15 Copa del Rey
| Athletic Bilbao | Barcelona |
| 1 | 3 |
- Date: 30 May 2015
- Venue: Camp Nou, Barcelona
- Man of the Match: Lionel Messi (Barcelona)
- Referee: Carlos Velasco Carballo
- Attendance: 99,354

The 2015 Copa del Rey final was an association football match on 30 May 2015 to decide the winner of the 2014–15 Copa del Rey, the 113th edition of Spain's premier football cup since its establishment (including two seasons where two rival editions were played).

It was played between Athletic Bilbao and Barcelona, at the Camp Nou, the latter club's home stadium. Barcelona won the match 3–1, achieving their record-extending 27th title in the competition. Lionel Messi and Neymar gave Barcelona a 2–0 lead at half time. Although Athletic replied with a goal by Iñaki Williams, Messi scored another goal late on to confirm his team's victory and was named man of the match. This was the second part of Barcelona's treble, with the team going on to win the 2015 UEFA Champions League final a week later.

Messi's first goal, in which he ran past a number of opponents, was the runner-up in the FIFA Puskás Award for the year's best goal. Neymar was criticised for his showboating in the final minutes of the match, with Barcelona manager Luis Enrique excusing his Brazilian striker for cultural reasons. Both teams and the Royal Spanish Football Federation were given fines by the nation's government for security breaches and allowing separatist demonstrations at the match. As Barcelona won the 2014–15 La Liga, Athletic qualified automatically as the cup representative in the 2015 Supercopa de España.

== Venue ==
Before the semi-final second leg, Barcelona's board requested the final be held at the Santiago Bernabéu Stadium, home of their fierce rivals Real Madrid, as it is the largest stadium in Spain apart from their own Camp Nou. At the same time, according to Barcelona-based newspaper La Vanguardia, the president of the Royal Spanish Football Federation (RFEF), Ángel María Villar, wanted the final at the San Mamés Stadium in Bilbao. That decision would have given Athletic Bilbao home advantage, but could have been challenged by potential finalist Espanyol, whose team bus was vandalised on their last visit there.

On 25 March, the RFEF confirmed that it would be held at Barcelona's Camp Nou. Real Madrid refused to let the final be played at their stadium, and the Camp Nou was chosen at an RFEF meeting ahead of the San Mamés, with Sevilla's Ramón Sánchez Pizjuán Stadium and Valencia's Mestalla Stadium eliminated in an earlier round of voting.

== Background ==
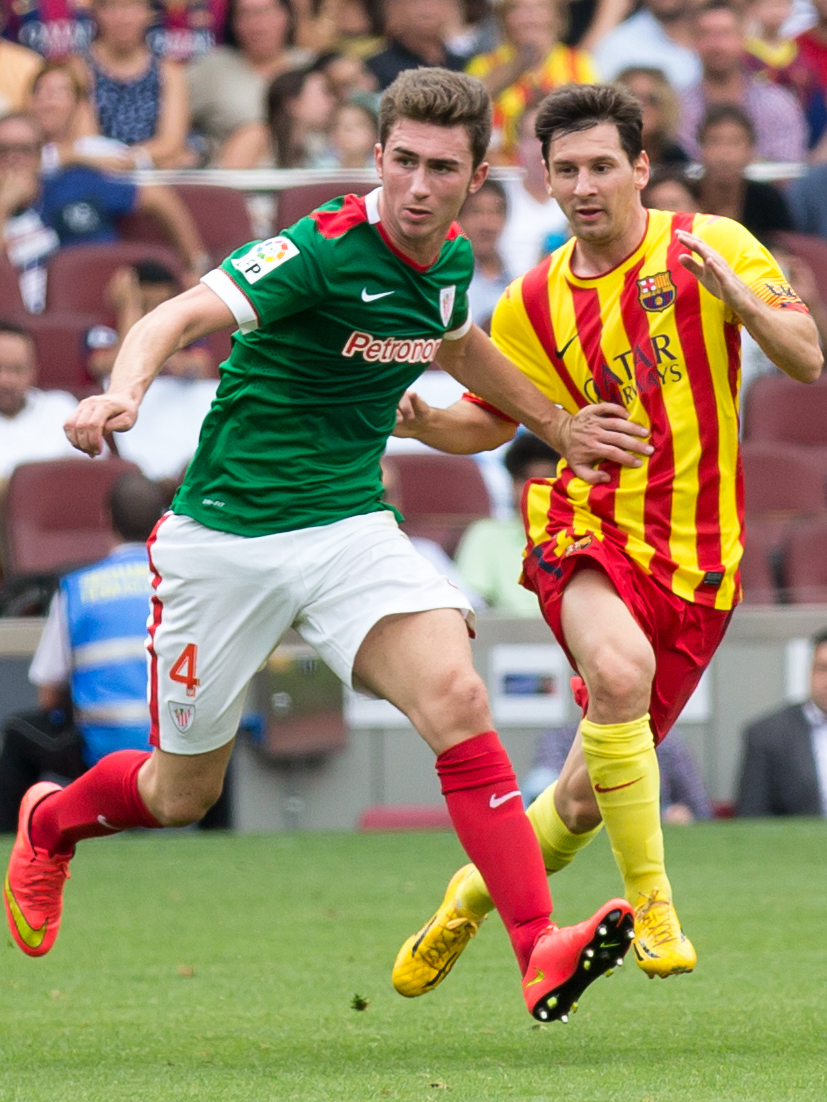
Aymeric Laporte of Athletic and Lionel Messi of Barcelona in the teams' league meeting on 13 September 2014

Barcelona had previously played 36 Copa del Rey Finals, a record bettered only by Real Madrid with 39. However, Barcelona had won the competition a record 26 times. Their most recent appearance in the final was the previous year's edition, in which they lost 1–2 to Real Madrid at the Mestalla in Valencia. Their most recent win was in 2012, beating Athletic Bilbao 3–0 at the Vicente Calderón Stadium in Madrid. Their only previous final at the Camp Nou was a victory in 1963. The last team to play a Copa del Rey Final at their own ground was Real Madrid, who lost in 2013 to Atlético Madrid and 2002 to Deportivo de La Coruña at their Santiago Bernabéu Stadium.

Athletic Bilbao had previously played in 35 finals, winning 23, with only Barcelona winning more. Their most recent final was in 2012, and their most recent victory in the tournament was in 1984, beating Barcelona 1–0 at the Bernabéu.

Barcelona and Athletic Bilbao had played each other in seven previous finals of the tournament. Barcelona won in 1920, 1942, 1953, 2009 and 2012, and Athletic Bilbao won in 1932 and 1984.

The two teams played each other twice during the 2014–15 La Liga season. In the first instance, at the Camp Nou on 13 September 2014, Barcelona won 2–0 with two goals from Neymar in the last 11 minutes of the game. On 8 February 2015 at Athletic Bilbao's San Mamés Stadium, Barcelona won 5–2. Lionel Messi and Luis Suárez gave them a 2–0 half-time lead. Four goals came between the 59th and 66th minutes: Mikel Rico scored for Athletic, his teammate Óscar de Marcos scored an own goal, Neymar achieved a fourth for Barcelona and Aritz Aduriz a second for Athletic. Later on in the game, Xabier Etxeita was sent off for the hosts and Pedro netted a fifth for the visitors.

The final was jeopardised due to a dispute over the sharing of television revenue between Spanish clubs, with all football in the country due to be suspended from 16 May. However, two days before the intended suspension, this action was deemed unlawful by the Spanish High Court, and the season continued.

== Route to the final ==
| Athletic Bilbao | | | Round | Barcelona |
|---|---|---|---|---|---|---|
| Opponent | Result | Legs | | Opponent | Result | Legs |
| Alcoyano | 2–1 | 1–1 away; 1–0 home | Round of 32 | Huesca | 12–1 | 0–4 away; 8–1 home |
| Celta Vigo | 4–4 | 2–4 away; 0–2 home | Round of 16 | Elche | 9–0 | 5–0 home; 0–4 away |
| Málaga | 1–0 | 0–0 away; 1–0 home | Quarter-finals | Atlético Madrid | 4–2 | 1–0 home; 2–3 away |
| Espanyol | 3–1 | 1–1 home; 0–2 away | Semi-finals | Villarreal | 6–2 | 3–1 home; 1–3 away |

=== Athletic Bilbao ===
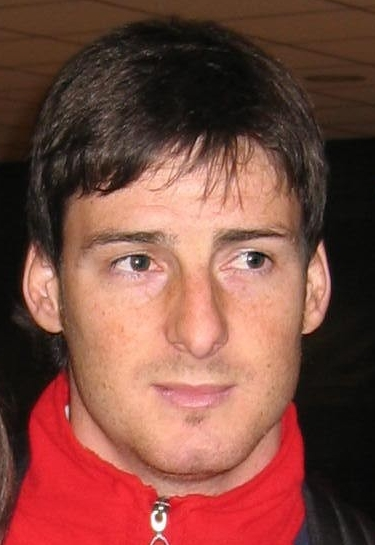
Aritz Aduriz scored five goals in Athletic's progression through to the final

Athletic Bilbao, of La Liga, entered in the last 32 against a Segunda División B team, Alcoyano. In the first leg away at the Estadio El Collao on 2 December 2014, they drew 1–1; Francis opened the scoring for the hosts while Borja Viguera equalised in added time. Sixteen days later at the San Mamés Stadium, Viguera's first-half strike was enough to win the match.

In the last 16, the club faced top-flight club Celta Vigo, and began with a 4–2 away win at the Galician club's Balaídos on 6 January 2015. Defender Mikel San José headed Athletic into an early lead, only for Álex López to equalise for the hosts six minutes later, and Aritz Aduriz to restore the visitors' lead four minutes after that. In the second half, Charles made it level again, but a Markel Susaeta goal and a late penalty from Aduriz gave Athletic the win. Celta won the second leg 2–0 via a Xabier Etxeita own goal and a Fabián Orellana contribution, but Athletic advanced on the away goals rule.

Athletic's quarter-final began on 21 January with a goalless draw at the La Rosaleda against Málaga, but eight days later in the second leg Aduriz scored three minutes into the second half to send them into the semi-finals. The semi-final against Espanyol began with a 1–1 home draw, Aduriz putting Bilbao ahead on his 34th birthday and Víctor Sánchez equalising ten minutes before half time. On 4 March, Athletic travelled for the second leg at the Estadi Cornellà-El Prat and won 2–0 to reach the final, with first-half goals from Aduriz and Etxeita.

=== Barcelona ===
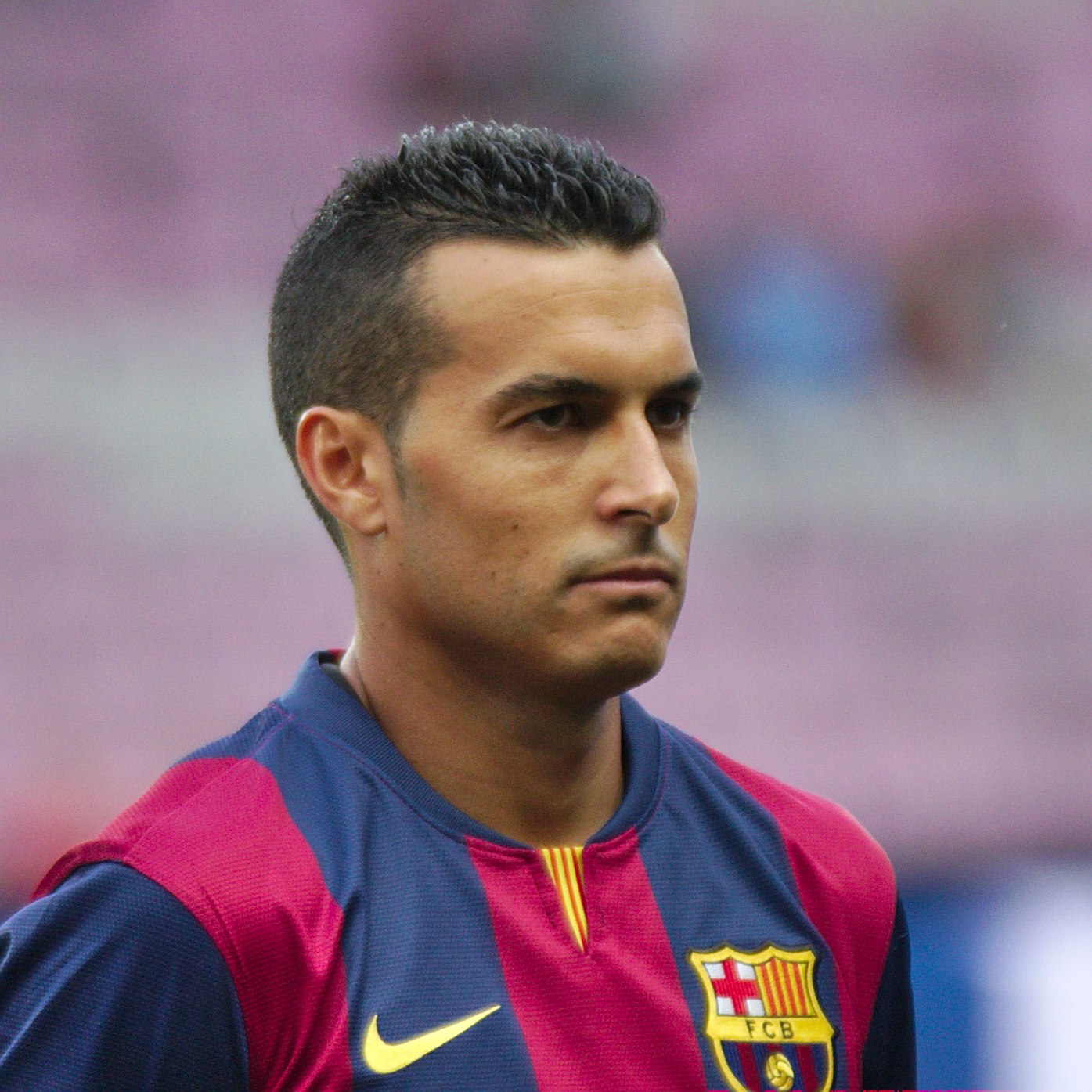
Pedro scored a hat-trick in Barcelona's 8–1 win over Huesca in the last 32

Barcelona, also of La Liga, entered the tournament in the last 32 against a Segunda División B club, Huesca. The first leg was in Aragon at the Estadio El Alcoraz on 3 December 2014, and Barcelona won 4–0 with goals from Ivan Rakitić, Andrés Iniesta, Pedro and Rafinha. Due to the large advantage, Barcelona rested key players for the second leg but nonetheless won 8–1 for a 12–1 aggregate. Pedro scored a hat-trick among further goals from Sergi Roberto and Iniesta for a 5–0 half-time lead, while Adriano and substitutes Adama Traoré and Sandro Ramírez added more goals in the second half; Carlos David scored a late consolation for the visitors.

In the last 16, Barcelona met top-flight opposition in the shape of Elche, but won 9–0 on aggregate. They hosted the first leg at the Camp Nou on 8 January 2015 and won 5–0, with two goals from Neymar, a Lionel Messi penalty and contributions from Luis Suárez and Jordi Alba. A week later at the Estadio Manuel Martínez Valero, Barcelona defeated the Valencian club 4–0, starting with a free kick from defender Jérémy Mathieu followed by a long-range strike by Roberto, a penalty by Pedro and an added-time goal by Adriano.

On 21 January, Barcelona hosted the first leg of the quarter-finals, and defeated Atlético Madrid 1–0. Sergio Busquets was fouled, giving Barcelona a late penalty. Messi took it and it was saved by Atlético goalkeeper Jan Oblak, but Messi scored the rebound. A week later at the Vicente Calderón Stadium, the hosts made the aggregate score level in the first minute through Fernando Torres; in the ninth minute, Neymar put Barcelona back into the lead. When Javier Mascherano fouled Juanfran, Raúl García's penalty gave the advantage back to Atlético, but Barcelona scored two more goals in the first half from a Miranda own goal and Neymar to win 4–2 on aggregate. Atlético captain Gabi was sent off at half time for arguing with the referee, and his midfield partner Mario Suárez was also dismissed later on.

Barcelona hosted the first leg of their semi-final on 11 February, and defeated Villarreal 3–1, with a half-time lead from Messi. Within the first five minutes of the second half, Manu Trigueros equalised with a long-range strike but Iniesta gave the advantage back to Barcelona, which was extended by Gerard Piqué later on despite Neymar missing a penalty. They won by the same scoreline again in the second leg at the Estadio El Madrigal on 4 March with a brace from Neymar and a goal by Suárez, despite former Barcelona player Jonathan dos Santos equalising at one point.

== Match ==
=== Summary ===
Athletic kicked the game off, and had an opportunity after five minutes, when Mikel Rico crossed for Aduriz, but he was prevented from making contact with the ball by Jordi Alba. Five minutes later, Barcelona launched a counter-attack starting with goalkeeper Marc-André ter Stegen and ending with Neymar volleying the ball into the goal, but it was ruled out for offside. Soon after, Iago Herrerín saved from Messi. In the 20th minute, Messi scored the first goal of the game, taking possession on the right-hand side of the pitch and beating four defenders before finishing with a near-post shot. Barcelona had more chances after this, with Herrerín making saves from Neymar. In the 36th minute, Neymar scored the second goal of the game, finishing from close range when set up by Suárez, after earlier work by Messi and Rakitić. Near the end of the first half, Andoni Iraola set up Iñaki Williams, whose volley missed the target. Piqué and Iraola received yellow cards at the end of the first half, for fouls on Aduriz and Suárez respectively.

Ten minutes into the second half, Andrés Iniesta was substituted for Xavi, who took over as captain for his 766th Barcelona appearance, and last one at the Camp Nou. Soon after, Athletic substituted Iraola in his final match, replacing him with Susaeta, while Mikel Balenziaga was booked for his foul on Messi. In the 74th minute, Dani Alves co-operated with Neymar before setting up Messi to put Barcelona 3–0 up. Six minutes later, Athletic gained a consolation goal from Williams' header. In the closing stages of the game, Neymar showboated around opposition players, and was pushed over by Unai Bustinza, starting a melée between both sets of players. After play restarted, Neymar received a yellow card for fouling Balenziaga. In added time Susaeta fouled Neymar, and Busquets was booked afterwards for dissent; the foul earned a free kick from which Xavi hit the post.

=== Details ===
30 May 2015
21:30 CEST

| Athletic Bilbao | 1–3 | Barcelona |
|---|---|---|
| Williams 79' | Report | Messi 20', 74'; Neymar 36' |

Camp Nou, Barcelona
Attendance: 99,354
Referee: Carlos Velasco Carballo

| Athletic Bilbao | Barcelona |

| GK | 13 | (Spain) Iago Herrerín |
| RB | 12 | (Spain) Unai Bustinza |
| CB | 16 | (Spain) Xabier Etxeita |
| CB | 4 | (France) Aymeric Laporte |
| LB | 24 | (Spain) Mikel Balenziaga | (yellow card) 58' |
| CM | 6 | (Spain) Mikel San José |
| CM | 7 | (Spain) Beñat Etxebarria | | (substituted off) 75' |
| RW | 15 | (Spain) Andoni Iraola (c) | (yellow card) 43' | (substituted off) 58' |
| AM | 17 | (Spain) Mikel Rico | | (substituted off) 74' |
| LW | 30 | (Spain) Iñaki Williams | (yellow card) 67' |
| CF | 20 | (Spain) Aritz Aduriz |
Substitutes:
| GK | 1 | (Spain) Gorka Iraizoz |
| MF | 8 | (Spain) Ander Iturraspe | (yellow card) 87' | (substituted on) 74' |
| FW | 9 | (Spain) Kike Sola |
| MF | 11 | (Spain) Ibai | | (substituted on) 75' |
| MF | 14 | (Spain) Markel Susaeta | | (substituted on) 58' |
| DF | 18 | (Spain) Carlos Gurpegui |
| MF | 23 | (Spain) Ager Aketxe |
Manager:
(Spain) Ernesto Valverde

| GK | 1 | (Germany) Marc-André ter Stegen |
| RB | 22 | (Brazil) Dani Alves |
| CB | 3 | (Spain) Gerard Piqué | (yellow card) 42' |
| CB | 14 | (Argentina) Javier Mascherano |
| LB | 18 | (Spain) Jordi Alba | | (substituted off) 77' |
| CM | 4 | (Croatia) Ivan Rakitić |
| CM | 5 | (Spain) Sergio Busquets | (yellow card) 90' |
| CM | 8 | (Spain) Andrés Iniesta (c) | | (substituted off) 56' |
| RW | 10 | (Argentina) Lionel Messi |
| CF | 9 | (Uruguay) Luis Suárez | | (substituted off) 78' |
| LW | 11 | (Brazil) Neymar | (yellow card) 88' |
Substitutes:
| GK | 13 | (Chile) Claudio Bravo |
| MF | 6 | (Spain) Xavi | | (substituted on) 56' |
| FW | 7 | (Spain) Pedro | | (substituted on) 78' |
| MF | 12 | (Brazil) Rafinha |
| DF | 15 | (Spain) Marc Bartra |
| DF | 21 | (Brazil) Adriano |
| DF | 24 | (France) Jérémy Mathieu | | (substituted on) 77' |
Manager:
(Spain) Luis Enrique

=== Post-match ===
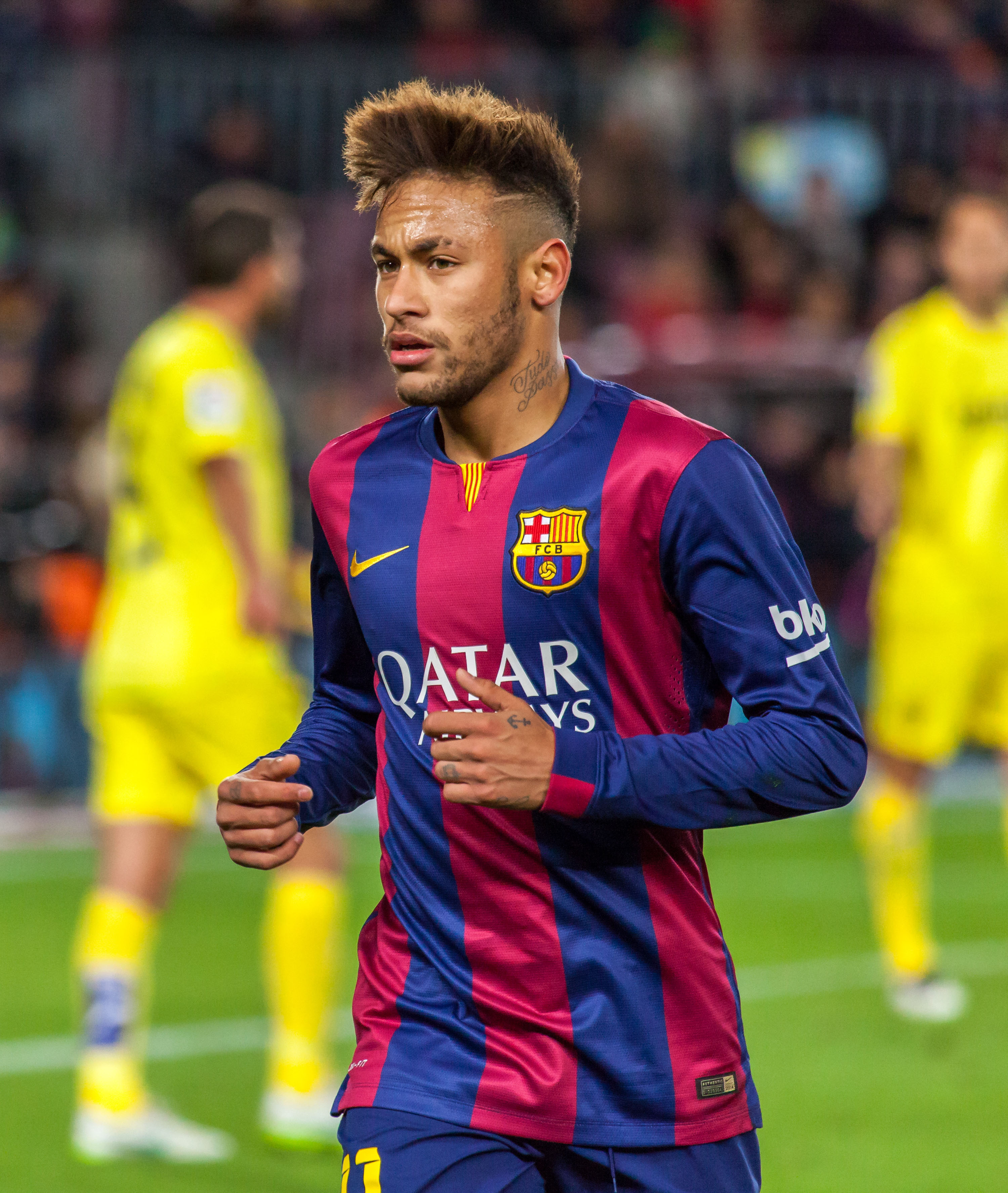
The conduct of Barcelona forward Neymar was debated by both teams after the final

The conduct of Neymar, who performed tricks with the ball in the closing stages of Barcelona's victory, was a talking point after the match. His opponent Iraola decried Neymar, saying that his actions were unsporting, while Barcelona manager Luis Enrique said that Neymar's actions were common in Brazil, even though frowned upon in Spain, and would have to change. However, Neymar himself did not apologise and said that he would repeat his behaviour in the future.

In July 2015, the Spanish Sports Council levied fines against both clubs and the RFEF, with all three entities deemed to have taken insufficient action against security breaches and planned protests of Basque and Catalan separatist supporters who jeered the Spanish national anthem and King Felipe VI. Barcelona were laden with a €66,000 fine, Athletic with €18,000 and the RFEF €123,000. Barcelona claimed that the fines were punishment of freedom of expression.

Lionel Messi's first goal was nominated for the FIFA Puskás Award at the 2015 FIFA Ballon d'Or. It finished as runner-up to a bicycle kick by Wendell Lira for Goianésia in the Brazilian third division.

Barcelona had already won La Liga, and concluded their treble a week after securing the Copa, with victory over Juventus in the 2015 UEFA Champions League final in Berlin. They became the first European club to win the national league, national cup and continental cup in one season on two separate occasions.

As Barcelona won both domestic tournaments, Athletic were the cup entrants in the 2015 Supercopa de España, in which they defeated Barcelona 5–1 on aggregate for their first trophy since their double in 1983–84. Athletic also entered the 2015–16 UEFA Europa League, but their status as beaten cup finalists no longer granted a place (unlike the seasons following their losses to UEFA Champions League-qualified Barcelona in 2009 and 2012) as the rules were changed from 2015 onwards; instead they qualified via their 7th-place league finish.

== See also ==
- Athletic–Barcelona clásico
