= Xabier Etxeita =

Spanish footballer (born 1987)

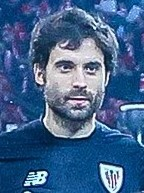
- Etxeita with Athletic Bilbao in 2018

Personal information
- Full name: Xabier Etxeita Gorritxategi
- Date of birth: 31 October 1987 (age 38)
- Place of birth: Amorebieta, Spain
- Height: 1.86 m (6 ft 1 in)
- Position: Centre-back

Youth career
- Amorebieta

Senior career*
| Years | Team | Apps | (Gls) |
| 2005–2006 | Amorebieta | | |
| 2006–2009 | Bilbao Athletic | 66 | (7) |
| 2008–2010 | Athletic Bilbao | 17 | (1) |
| 2010 | → Cartagena (loan) | 14 | (1) |
| 2010–2013 | Elche | 97 | (5) |
| 2013–2019 | Athletic Bilbao | 72 | (3) |
| 2018–2019 | → Huesca (loan) | 31 | (4) |
| 2019–2021 | Getafe | 28 | (0) |
| 2021–2022 | Eibar | 17 | (1) |
| 2022–2024 | Amorebieta | 53 | (0) |
| Total | | 395 | (22) |

International career
| 2015 | Spain | 1 | (0) |
| 2014–2016 | Basque Country | 3 | (0) |
- * Club domestic league appearances and goals

Xabier Etxeita Gorritxategi (Basque: [ʃaβier etʃeita]; Spanish: [ʃaˈβjeɾ eˈtʃejta]; born 31 October 1987) is a Spanish former professional footballer who played as a centre-back.

Over ten seasons, he totalled 148 La Liga games and eight goals for Athletic Bilbao, Huesca and Getafe. He added 154 appearances in the Segunda División with four clubs, winning the 2015 Supercopa de España with Athletic.

Etxeita played once with Spain, in 2015.

== Club career ==
Born in Amorebieta-Etxano, Biscay, Etxeita finished his development in Athletic Bilbao's prolific youth academy at Lezama, after playing with his hometown club SD Amorebieta as a forward. His first three games with the first team of the former, all in 2008–09's La Liga, were not without incidents: in his first, a 2–0 home win against neighbours CA Osasuna on 16 November 2008, he subbed in for the injured Ustaritz, being sent off in the following against CD Numancia (same venue and result). On 21 December, he replaced Ander Murillo who also retired before half-time due to injury, in a 1–0 away victory over Real Betis. In a season where he was also registered with the B side, he scored his first goal for the main squad on 23 May 2009, equalising an eventual 1–4 home loss to Atlético Madrid.

In the last days of the 2010 January transfer window, Etxeita moved on a five-month loan to FC Cartagena of Segunda División. On 15 July, he left Athletic and signed with another club at that level, Elche CF, quickly establishing himself in the starting XI.

On 4 June 2013, after contributing 40 games and four goals as the Valencian Community team returned to the top flight after more than 20 years, Etxeita returned to Athletic Bilbao on a free transfer. He only made his official debut on 7 April of the following year, featuring the full 90 minutes in a 2–1 away win over Levante UD.

Etxeita scored his second competitive goal for Athletic on 25 October 2014, the only in a league fixture at UD Almería. His third came on 4 March of the following year, as he helped to a 2–0 defeat of RCD Espanyol in Barcelona to make his team reach the final of the Copa del Rey for the first time in three years; he played the entire decisive match, a 3–1 loss to FC Barcelona, and also started both legs of the subsequent edition of the Supercopa de España against the same opponent, which was won 5–1 on aggregate and brought a first trophy for the player.

On 24 July 2018, Exteita was loaned to fellow top-division side SD Huesca for one year. In August 2019, the free agent left the San Mamés Stadium with 140 appearances in all competitions and joined Getafe CF of the same tier on a two-year contract.

On 15 July 2021, Exteita signed a one-year deal with SD Eibar, recently relegated to the second division. Having been released at the end of the season, he returned to his first club Amorebieta in September 2022. In his debut campaign, he helped it to reach the professional leagues for the second time in its 98-year history.

Etxeita retired at the end of 2023–24 aged 36, after his team's relegation.

== International career ==
Etxeita received his first call-up to the senior Spain national team in October 2015. He earned his only cap on the 12th, featuring the full 90 minutes in a 1–0 win in Ukraine – the last round, the nation had already secured the first position in its group – for the UEFA Euro 2016 qualifiers.

Etxeita also featured for the unofficial Basque Country regional side.

== Career statistics ==
As of match played 13 April 2021

Appearances and goals by club, season and competition
| Club | Season | League | | | National cup | | Continental | | Other | | Total | |
| Club | Season | Division | Apps | Goals | Apps | Goals | Apps | Goals | Apps | Goals | Apps | Goals |
|---|---|---|---|---|---|---|---|---|---|---|---|---|
| Bilbao Athletic | 2006–07 | Segunda División B | 29 | 4 | — | | — | | — | | 29 | 4 |
| Bilbao Athletic | 2007–08 | Segunda División B | 28 | 1 | — | | — | | — | | 28 | 1 |
| Bilbao Athletic | 2008–09 | Segunda División B | 9 | 2 | — | | — | | — | | 9 | 2 |
| Bilbao Athletic | Total | | 66 | 7 | 0 | 0 | 0 | 0 | 0 | 0 | 66 | 7 |
| Athletic Bilbao | 2008–09 | La Liga | 14 | 1 | 2 | 0 | — | | — | | 16 | 1 |
| Athletic Bilbao | 2009–10 | La Liga | 3 | 0 | 1 | 0 | 1 (Note: Appearances in UEFA Europa League) | 0 | — | | 5 | 0 |
| Athletic Bilbao | Total | | 17 | 1 | 3 | 0 | 1 | 0 | 0 | 0 | 21 | 1 |
| Cartagena (loan) | 2009–10 | Segunda División | 14 | 1 | 0 | 0 | — | | — | | 14 | 1 |
| Elche | 2010–11 | Segunda División | 21 | 0 | 1 | 0 | — | | 0 | 0 | 22 | 0 |
| Elche | 2011–12 | Segunda División | 36 | 1 | 1 | 0 | — | | — | | 37 | 1 |
| Elche | 2012–13 | Segunda División | 40 | 4 | 1 | 0 | — | | — | | 41 | 4 |
| Elche | Total | | 97 | 5 | 3 | 0 | 0 | 0 | 0 | 0 | 100 | 5 |
| Athletic Bilbao | 2013–14 | La Liga | 3 | 0 | 0 | 0 | — | | — | | 3 | 0 |
| Athletic Bilbao | 2014–15 | La Liga | 24 | 2 | 6 | 1 | 4 (Note: Two appearances in UEFA Europa League, two appearances in UEFA Champions League) | 0 | — | | 34 | 3 |
| Athletic Bilbao | 2015–16 | La Liga | 30 | 0 | 4 | 1 | 11 | 0 | 2 (Note: Appearances in Supercopa de España) | 0 | 47 | 1 |
| Athletic Bilbao | 2016–17 | La Liga | 10 | 0 | 4 | 1 | 2 | 0 | — | | 16 | 1 |
| Athletic Bilbao | 2017–18 | La Liga | 5 | 1 | 2 | 0 | 12 | 1 | — | | 19 | 2 |
| Athletic Bilbao | Total | | 72 | 3 | 16 | 3 | 29 | 1 | 2 | 0 | 119 | 7 |
| Athletic Bilbao | Total Athletic Bilbao | | 89 | 4 | 19 | 3 | 30 | 1 | 2 | 0 | 140 | 8 |
| Huesca (loan) | 2018–19 | La Liga | 31 | 4 | 1 | 0 | — | | — | | 32 | 4 |
| Getafe | 2019–20 | La Liga | 17 | 0 | 2 | 0 | 3 | 0 | — | | 22 | 0 |
| Getafe | 2020–21 | La Liga | 11 | 0 | 1 | 0 | — | | — | | 12 | 0 |
| Getafe | Total | | 28 | 0 | 3 | 0 | 3 | 0 | 0 | 0 | 34 | 0 |
| Career total | | | 325 | 21 | 26 | 3 | 33 | 1 | 2 | 0 | 386 | 25 |

== Honours ==
Elche

- Segunda División: 2012–13

Athletic Bilbao

- Supercopa de España: 2015

Amorebieta

- Primera Federación: 2022–23
