= 2008–09 Athletic Bilbao season =

Athletic Bilbao
2008–09 season
- President: Fernando García Macua
- Head coach: Joaquín Caparrós
- Stadium: San Mamés
- La Liga: 13th
- Copa del Rey: Runners-up
- Top goalscorer: League: Fernando Llorente (13 goals); All: Fernando Llorente (17 goals)

The 2008–09 season was the 108th season in Athletic Bilbao's history and their 78th consecutive season in La Liga, the top division of Spanish football.

This season was the first since 1999–2000 without Dani Aranzubia who left to join fellow club Deportivo La Coruña.

== Squad statistics ==
=== Appearances and goals ===
No.	Pos	Nat	Player	Total		La Liga		Copa del Rey	
No.	Pos	Nat	Player	Apps	Goals	Apps	Goals	Apps	Goals
1	GK	(Spain) ESP	Gorka Iraizoz	45	0	36	0	9	0
2	FW	(Spain) ESP	Gaizka Toquero	26	3	10+10	1	2+4	2
3	DF	(Spain) ESP	Koikili Lertxundi	26	1	18	1	8	0
4	DF	(Spain) ESP	Ustaritz Aldekoaotalora	14	0	10+1	0	2+1	0
5	DF	(Venezuela) VEN	Fernando Amorebieta	36	0	28+1	0	7	0
6	MF	(Spain) ESP	Joseba del Olmo	11	1	2+8	1	0+1	0
7	MF	(Spain) ESP	David López	35	5	26+3	3	5+1	2
8	MF	(Spain) ESP	Joseba Garmendia	12	1	5+6	1	0+1	0
9	FW	(Spain) ESP	Fernando Llorente	43	17	34	13	9	4
10	MF	(Spain) ESP	Francisco Yeste	32	3	24+4	3	3+1	0
11	MF	(Spain) ESP	Igor Gabilondo	23	4	11+6	2	5+1	2
12	FW	(Spain) ESP	Iñigo Vélez	4	0	0+3	0	0+1	0
13	GK	(Spain) ESP	Armando	4	0	2+2	0	0	0
14	MF	(Spain) ESP	Markel Susaeta	40	1	24+10	1	5+1	0
15	DF	(Spain) ESP	Andoni Iraola	41	6	33	6	8	0
16	MF	(Spain) ESP	Pablo Orbaiz	38	1	27+3	1	6+2	0
17	FW	(Spain) ESP	Joseba Etxeberria	26	2	7+16	2	0+3	0
18	MF	(Spain) ESP	Carlos Gurpegui	26	0	10+9	0	3+4	0
19	DF	(Spain) ESP	Ander Murillo	2	0	1+1	0	0	0
20	DF	(Spain) ESP	Aitor Ocio	37	1	28	1	9	0
21	FW	(Spain) ESP	Ion Vélez	38	5	17+12	3	6+3	2
22	MF	(Spain) ESP	Iñaki Muñoz	6	0	2+3	0	0+1	0
24	MF	(Spain) ESP	Javi Martínez	41	6	30+2	5	9	1
26	MF	(Spain) ESP	Ander Iturraspe	5	0	1+3	0	1	0
29	DF	(Spain) ESP	Xabier Etxeita	16	1	8+6	1	0+2	0
33	DF	(Spain) ESP	Eneko Bóveda	2	0	1+1	0	0	0
41	MF	(Spain) ESP	Adrien Goñi	1	0	1	0	0	0
42	DF	(Spain) ESP	Mikel Balenziaga	26	0	21+3	0	1+1	0
47	DF	(Spain) ESP	Xabi Etxebarria	0	0	0	0	0	0
	DF	(Spain) ESP	Javier Casas	2	0	1+1	0	0	0

== Competitions ==
=== La Liga ===
==== League table ====
Pos	Team	Pld	W	D	L	GF	GA	GD	Pts	Qualification or relegation
11	Almería	38	13	7	18	45	61	−16	46 (Note: ALM 1–1 RAC; RAC 0–2 ALM)	
12	Racing Santander	38	12	10	16	49	48	+1	46	
13	Athletic Bilbao	38	12	8	18	47	62	−15	44	Qualification for the Europa League third qualifying round (Note: Since Barcelona, winners of the 2008–09 Copa del Rey, already qualified for the 2009–10 UEFA Champions League, losing cup finalists Athletic Bilbao earned a spot in the third qualifying round of the 2009–10 UEFA Europa League.)
14	Sporting Gijón	38	14	1	23	47	79	−32	43 (Note: SPG: 12 pts; OSA: 2 pts → OSA 3–3 VLD; VLD: 2 pts → VLD 0–0 OSA)	
15	Osasuna	38	10	13	15	41	47	−6	43	

Source: LFP and Yahoo! Sport
Rules for classification: 1) points; 2) head-to-head points; 3) head-to-head goal difference; 4) head-to-head goals scored; 5) goal difference; 6) number of goals scored.

=== Copa del Rey ===
22 January 2009; 20:00 CET Quarter-finals 1st leg	Athletic Bilbao	0–0	Sporting de Gijón	San Mamés, Bilbao
		Report		Attendance: 35,000; Referee: Medina Cantalejo

28 January 2009; 21:00 CET Quarter-finals 2nd leg	Sporting de Gijón	1–2 (1–2 agg.)	Athletic Bilbao	El Molinón, Gijón
	Carmelo 1'	Report	Gabilondo 42'; López 51'	Attendance: 18,000; Referee: González Vázquez

4 February 2009; 21:15 CET Semi-finals 1st leg	Sevilla	2–1	Athletic Bilbao	Ramón Sánchez Pizjuán, Seville
	Duscher 61'; Acosta 90+2'	Report	Llorente 42'	Attendance: 30,000; Referee: Carlos Velasco Carballo

4 March 2009; 20:00 CET Semi-finals 2nd leg	Athletic Bilbao	3–0 (4–2 agg.)	Sevilla	San Mamés, Bilbao
	Martínez 4'; Llorente 34'; Toquero 37'	Report		Attendance: 39,750; Referee: Mejuto González

13 May 2009; 22:00 CEST Final	Athletic Bilbao	1–4	Barcelona	Mestalla, Valencia
	Toquero 8'	Report	Touré 31'; Messi 54'; Bojan 57'; Xavi 64'	Attendance: 50,000; Referee: Medina Cantalejo
