= Mikel Rico =

Spanish footballer (born 1984)

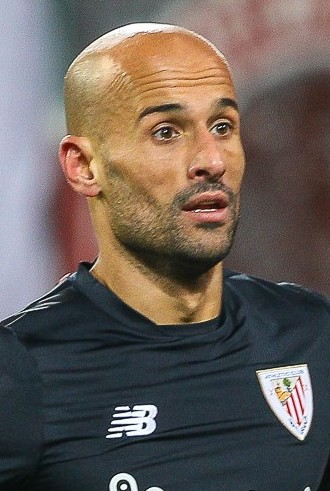
- Rico in 2018

Personal information
- Full name: Mikel Rico Moreno
- Date of birth: 4 November 1984 (age 42)
- Place of birth: Arrigorriaga, Spain
- Height: 1.78 m (5 ft 10 in)
- Position: Midfielder

Youth career
- Padura
- Danok Bat
- 2000–2003: Basconia

Senior career*
| Years | Team | Apps | (Gls) |
| 2001 | Basconia | 1 | (0) |
| 2003–2004 | Conquense B | | |
| 2004–2005 | Conquense | 44 | (3) |
| 2005–2009 | Poli Ejido | 55 | (2) |
| 2005–2006 | → Conquense (loan) | 35 | (9) |
| 2007–2008 | → Huesca (loan) | 35 | (6) |
| 2009–2010 | Huesca | 42 | (5) |
| 2010–2013 | Granada | 114 | (7) |
| 2013–2019 | Athletic Bilbao | 126 | (10) |
| 2019–2022 | Huesca | 104 | (8) |
| 2022–2024 | Cartagena | 68 | (3) |
| Total | | 624 | (53) |

International career
| 2011–2018 | Basque Country | 4 | (0) |
- * Club domestic league appearances and goals

Mikel Rico Moreno (Basque pronunciation: [mikel riko moɾeno]; Spanish pronunciation: [ˈmikel ˈriko moˈɾeno]; born 4 November 1984) is a Spanish former professional footballer who played as a central midfielder.

After spending much of his career in Spain's lower divisions with Conquense, Polideportivo Ejido and Huesca, he achieved promotion to La Liga with Granada in 2011, moving to Athletic Bilbao two years later. He amassed totals of 200 matches and 15 goals in the top division over eight seasons, before returning to Huesca in summer 2019.

== Club career ==
=== Early years ===
Born in Arrigorriaga, Biscay, Rico was schooled in football at local clubs Padura Club and Danok Bat CF as a child. He then joined the ranks of neighbouring CD Basconia, which acted as a farm team of Athletic Bilbao; in April 2001 he appeared as a late substitute in one Tercera División match, where Joseba Arriaga and Andoni Iraola also featured.

Rico moved to UB Conquense in 2003. Most of the first season was spent in their reserves, but the second, also in the Segunda División B, saw him feature regularly, attracting the attention of Polideportivo Ejido who signed him in 2005.

Rico was loaned back to Conquense for 2005–06, which ended in relegation from the third level. He made his debut as a professional with Ejido in the following campaign, making 20 league appearances before being loaned out again, to SD Huesca.

In 2007–08, Rico helped Huesca achieve promotion to division two via the play-offs. Afterwards, he returned to the Estadio Municipal Santo Domingo for one more season, still in the third tier.

=== Huesca and Granada ===
In summer 2009, Rico was signed permanently by Huesca. On 19 June 2010, he scored one of his five goals during the campaign in a 1–0 away win against RC Celta de Vigo, being crucial as the Aragonese finally avoided relegation.

Rico joined fellow league side Granada CF on 31 August 2010, for €600,000 on a four-year deal. He posted similar individual numbers in his first year – 40 matches, two goals, nearly 3,500 minutes of action – and his team returned to La Liga after more than three decades via the play-offs; he displayed versatility in the process, featuring in several positions.

Rico made his debut in the top flight on 27 August 2011 at nearly 27 years of age, playing the full 90 minutes in a 0–1 derby home loss against Real Betis. He scored his first goal in the competition on 31 October, contributing to a 2–1 victory at Sevilla FC through a 90th-minute strike; during his spell, he played as a box-to-box midfielder as well as a defensive one.

=== Athletic Bilbao ===
Rico joined Athletic Bilbao in late August 2013, penning a three-year deal with a €35 million buyout clause. He played his first game with his new team on 1 September, the first half of a 3–1 away defeat to Real Madrid. He featured in 94 matches in all competitions over his first two seasons – starting the vast majority – including all of his team's matches in the 2014–15 UEFA Champions League campaign, and culminating in the final defeat to FC Barcelona in the Copa del Rey. Thereafter, he was used less frequently by head coach Ernesto Valverde, appearing in 30 fixtures during 2015–16 and 23 during 2016–17 but often as a late substitute.

Under José Ángel Ziganda in 2017–18, it appeared Rico's spell at the club was coming to an end as he made no league appearances at all in the first portion of the campaign after recovering from some physical issues, even as the new coach tried out various squad members to find the optimal personnel for his tactics. However, after finally being introduced to the team from the bench during a match against Villarreal CF (1–1) on 19 November 2017, shortly after his 33rd birthday, he became a regular starter again, playing the entirety of the next eight league games and two in the Europa League in which Athletic remained undefeated.

On 2 February 2018, 33-year-old Rico signed a contract extension running until June 2019. In early 2019, it was announced that he would leave at the end of the season when that contract ended. The club's final home match involved tributes to him, as well as fellow long-serving squad members Ander Iturraspe and Markel Susaeta who were also departing in similar circumstances.

=== Return to Huesca ===
On 7 July 2019, Rico returned to Huesca as a free agent. The 35-year-old scored seven goals from 42 appearances in the first season in his third spell, and the champions returned to the top tier after one year out.

=== Cartagena ===
On 24 June 2022, Rico signed a one-year contract with FC Cartagena in the second division. On 24 May 2024, he announced his retirement at the end of the season.

== International career ==
Rico never earned any caps for Spain at any level. He did feature for the unofficial Basque Country regional team.

== Honours ==
Athletic Bilbao

- Supercopa de España: 2015

Huesca

- Segunda División: 2019–20
