= 2015 Supercopa de España =

Athletic Bilbao	Barcelona
Copa del Rey	La Liga
5	1
- on aggregate

First leg
Athletic Bilbao	Barcelona
4	0
- Date: 14 August 2015
- Venue: San Mamés, Bilbao
- Referee: José Luis González González
- Attendance: 45,000

Second leg
Barcelona	Athletic Bilbao
1	1
- Date: 17 August 2015
- Venue: Camp Nou, Barcelona
- Referee: Carlos Velasco Carballo
- Attendance: 88,834

The 2015 Supercopa de España was a two-legged football match-up that was played in August 2015 between Athletic Bilbao, runners-up of the 2014–15 Copa del Rey, and Barcelona, the champions of 2014–15 La Liga and the 2014–15 Copa del Rey, making it a rematch of the 2015 Copa del Rey final.

Athletic Bilbao won the trophy 5–1 on aggregate to win the club's first competitive title since winning the 1983–84 Copa del Rey. Aritz Aduriz scored a hat-trick for Athletic Bilbao in the first leg in a 4–0 win on 14 August. He added a fourth goal three days later in the second leg, which ended in a 1–1 draw at the Camp Nou.

== Background ==
This was the 26th appearance of Barcelona in the Supercopa, more than any other club. For Athletic Bilbao, it was their fifth appearances in the competition. The duel between the two clubs in the Supercopa was the fourth, with Barcelona winning on all the three previous occasions.

== Match details ==
=== First leg ===
14 August 2015
22:00 CEST (UTC+02:00)

Athletic Bilbao	4–0	Barcelona
San José 13'; Aduriz 52', 61', 67' (pen.)	Report

San Mamés, Bilbao
Attendance: 45,000
Referee: José Luis González González

Athletic Bilbao	Barcelona

GK	1	(Spain) Gorka Iraizoz (c)
RB	10	(Spain) Óscar de Marcos
CB	16	(Spain) Xabier Etxeita	(yellow card) 70'
CB	4	(France) Aymeric Laporte
LB	24	(Spain) Mikel Balenziaga
DM	7	(Spain) Beñat Etxebarria	(yellow card) 44'
DM	6	(Spain) Mikel San José	(yellow card) 89'
RM	14	(Spain) Markel Susaeta	(yellow card) 73'	(substituted off) 84'
AM	5	(Spain) Javier Eraso	(yellow card) 43'	(substituted off) 76'
LM	25	(Spain) Sabin Merino		(substituted off) 66'
CF	20	(Spain) Aritz Aduriz
Substitutes:
GK	13	(Spain) Iago Herrerín
DF	2	(Spain) Eneko Bóveda		(substituted on) 84'
DF	3	(Spain) Gorka Elustondo
DF	18	(Spain) Carlos Gurpegui	(yellow card) 87'	(substituted on) 76'
DF	30	(Spain) Iñigo Lekue		(substituted on) 66'
MF	23	(Spain) Ager Aketxe
FW	9	(Spain) Kike Sola
Manager:
(Spain) Ernesto Valverde

GK	1	(Germany) Marc-André ter Stegen
RB	6	(Brazil) Dani Alves	(yellow card) 66'
CB	15	(Spain) Marc Bartra
CB	23	(Belgium) Thomas Vermaelen
LB	21	(Brazil) Adriano
DM	14	(Argentina) Javier Mascherano	(yellow card) 80'
CM	12	(Brazil) Rafinha		(substituted off) 51'
CM	20	(Spain) Sergi Roberto		(substituted off) 59'
RF	10	(Argentina) Lionel Messi (c)
CF	9	(Uruguay) Luis Suárez
LF	7	(Spain) Pedro	(yellow card) 40'	(substituted off) 71'
Substitutes:
GK	13	(Chile) Claudio Bravo
DF	3	(Spain) Gerard Piqué
MF	4	(Croatia) Ivan Rakitić		(substituted on) 59'
MF	5	(Spain) Sergio Busquets
MF	8	(Spain) Andrés Iniesta	(yellow card) 89'	(substituted on) 51'
FW	16	(Spain) Sandro		(substituted on) 71'
FW	17	(Spain) Munir
Manager:
(Spain) Luis Enrique

Assistant referees:
José María Sánchez Santos
Ignacio Rubio Palomino
Fourth official:
Germán Cid Camacho

=== Second leg ===
17 August 2015
22:00 CEST (UTC+02:00)

Barcelona	1–1	Athletic Bilbao
Messi 43'	Report	Aduriz 74'

Camp Nou, Barcelona
Attendance: 88,834
Referee: Carlos Velasco Carballo

Barcelona	Athletic Bilbao

GK	13	(Chile) Claudio Bravo
RB	6	(Brazil) Dani Alves
CB	3	(Spain) Gerard Piqué	(red card) 55'
CB	14	(Argentina) Javier Mascherano	(yellow card) 55'
LB	24	(France) Jérémy Mathieu
DM	5	(Spain) Sergio Busquets
CM	4	(Croatia) Ivan Rakitić		(substituted off) 68'
CM	8	(Spain) Andrés Iniesta (c)
RW	10	(Argentina) Lionel Messi
LW	7	(Spain) Pedro	(yellow card) 43'	(substituted off) 68'
CF	9	(Uruguay) Luis Suárez
Substitutes:
GK	1	(Germany) Marc-André ter Stegen
DF	15	(Spain) Marc Bartra
DF	23	(Belgium) Thomas Vermaelen
MF	12	(Brazil) Rafinha
MF	20	(Spain) Sergi Roberto
FW	16	(Spain) Sandro		(substituted on) 68'
FW	17	(Spain) Munir		(substituted on) 68'
Manager:
(Spain) Luis Enrique

GK	1	(Spain) Gorka Iraizoz
RB	2	(Spain) Eneko Bóveda	(yellow card) 29'
CB	16	(Spain) Xabier Etxeita		(substituted off) 68'
CB	4	(France) Aymeric Laporte
LB	24	(Spain) Mikel Balenziaga
DM	18	(Spain) Carlos Gurpegui (c)
DM	7	(Spain) Beñat Etxebarria	(yellow card) 59'	(substituted off) 82'
RM	10	(Spain) Óscar de Marcos
AM	5	(Spain) Javier Eraso	(yellow card) 41'
LM	14	(Spain) Markel Susaeta
CF	20	(Spain) Aritz Aduriz	(yellow card) 58'	(substituted off) 79'
Substitutes:
GK	13	(Spain) Iago Herrerín
DF	3	(Spain) Gorka Elustondo		(substituted on) 68'
DF	30	(Spain) Iñigo Lekue
MF	17	(Spain) Mikel Rico		(substituted on) 82'
MF	23	(Spain) Ager Aketxe
FW	9	(Spain) Kike Sola	(red card) 86'	(substituted on) 79'
FW	25	(Spain) Sabin Merino
Manager:
(Spain) Ernesto Valverde

Assistant referees:
Roberto Alonso Fernández
Marcos Álvarez Moreno
Fourth official:
Miguel Ángel Ortiz Arias

== See also ==
- 2015–16 La Liga
- 2015–16 Copa del Rey
- 2015–16 Athletic Bilbao season
- 2015–16 FC Barcelona season
- Athletic–Barcelona clásico
