= Eneko Bóveda =

Spanish footballer (born 1988)

Personal information
- Full name: Eneko Bóveda Altube
- Date of birth: 14 December 1988 (age 37)
- Place of birth: Bilbao, Spain
- Height: 1.81 m (5 ft 11 in)
- Position: Defender

Youth career
- 1999–2000: Ikastola Maiztegi
- 2000–2006: Athletic Bilbao

Senior career*
Years	Team	Apps	(Gls)
2006–2008	Basconia	44	(0)
2008–2011	Bilbao Athletic	59	(0)
2009–2011	Athletic Bilbao	3	(0)
2011–2015	Eibar	113	(5)
2015–2018	Athletic Bilbao	48	(0)
2018–2021	Deportivo La Coruña	76	(2)
2021–2022	Olympiakos Nicosia	28	(0)
Total		371	(7)

International career
2014–2016	Basque Country	3	(0)
- * Club domestic league appearances and goals

Eneko Bóveda Altube (born 14 December 1988) is a Spanish former professional footballer who played as a right-back or central defender.

He started his career at Athletic Bilbao, returning there after a four-year spell with Eibar.

== Club career ==
=== Athletic Bilbao ===
Born in Bilbao, Biscay, Bóveda was a product of Athletic Bilbao's famed youth academy at Lezama. He made his debut as a senior with the farm team in the 2006–07 season, in the Tercera División, and was promoted to the reserves who competed in the Segunda División B in summer 2008.

Bóveda made his first-team – and La Liga – debut on 26 April 2009 in a 2–1 home win against Racing de Santander, coming on as a 70th-minute substitute for David López. He spent the vast majority of his spell registered with the B side, however.

=== Eibar ===
On 1 July 2011, Bóveda signed for neighbouring SD Eibar also in the third tier. He was an undisputed first-choice in the 2012–13 campaign, as the Armeros returned to Segunda División after a four-year absence.

Bóveda scored his first professional goal on 13 April 2014, but in a 1–2 home loss to CD Tenerife. He appeared in 18 matches during the season, achieving promotion to the top flight (the club's first ever).

Bóveda scored his first goal in the Spanish top division on 25 October 2014, closing the 1–1 home draw against Granada CF.

=== Return to Athletic ===
Bóveda returned to Athletic on 1 July 2015, after refusing to renew his contract. The following month, he featured in both legs of the Supercopa de España in which his team defeated FC Barcelona. He started infrequently in his first and second seasons but was a useful squad member, providing cover both at full-back and in the centre of the defence.

On 17 January 2018, still only appearing occasionally and with his contract running out at the end of the campaign, it was announced that Bóveda would not receive an extension.

=== Deportivo ===
On 22 January 2018, Bóveda signed for fellow top-tier club Deportivo de La Coruña, agreeing a deal with the Galicians until summer 2020 and leaving his native Basque Country for the first time in his career. He suffered two relegations in only three years.

Bóveda retired in June 2022 aged 33, after a stint in the Cypriot First Division with Olympiakos Nicosia. Four months later, he returned to Athletic Bilbao to work as a scout.

== International career ==
Bóveda never earned any caps for Spain at any level. He did feature for the unofficial Basque Country regional team.

== Career statistics ==
As of match played 14 March 2021

Appearances and goals by club, season and competition
Club	Season	League			National cup		Continental		Other		Total	
Club	Season	Division	Apps	Goals	Apps	Goals	Apps	Goals	Apps	Goals	Apps	Goals
Bilbao Athletic	2008–09	Segunda División B	16	0	—		—		—		16	0
Bilbao Athletic	2009–10	Segunda División B	14	0	—		—		—		14	0
Bilbao Athletic	2010–11	Segunda División B	29	0	—		—		—		29	0
Bilbao Athletic	Total		59	0	0	0	0	0	0	0	59	0
Athletic Bilbao	2008–09	La Liga	2	0	0	0	—		—		2	0
Athletic Bilbao	2009–10	La Liga	1	0	0	0	—		—		1	0
Athletic Bilbao	Total		3	0	0	0	0	0	0	0	3	0
Eibar	2011–12	Segunda División B	27	1	2	0	—		2 (Note: Appearances in promotion playoffs)	0	31	1
Eibar	2012–13	Segunda División B	33	1	5	0	—		6	0	44	1
Eibar	2013–14	Segunda División	18	1	0	0	—		—		18	1
Eibar	2014–15	La Liga	35	2	2	0	—		—		37	2
Eibar	Total		113	5	9	0	0	0	8	0	130	5
Athletic Bilbao	2015–16	La Liga	23	0	3	0	9 (Note: Appearances in UEFA Europa League)	0	2 (Note: Appearances in Supercopa de España)	0	37	0
Athletic Bilbao	2016–17	La Liga	19	0	3	0	1	0	—		23	0
Athletic Bilbao	2017–18	La Liga	6	0	0	0	2	0	—		8	0
Athletic Bilbao	Total		48	0	6	0	12	0	2	0	68	0
Deportivo La Coruña	2017–18	La Liga	8	0	0	0	—		—		8	0
Deportivo La Coruña	2018–19	Segunda División	20	0	1	0	—		3	0	24	0
Deportivo La Coruña	2019–20	Segunda División	31	1	1	0	—		—		32	1
Deportivo La Coruña	2020–21	Segunda División B	10	1	2	0	—		—		12	1
Deportivo La Coruña	Total		69	2	4	0	0	0	3	0	76	2
Career total			292	7	19	0	12	0	13	0	336	7

== Honours ==
Eibar

- Segunda División: 2013–14

Athletic Bilbao

- Supercopa de España: 2015
