= Iago Herrerín =

Spanish footballer (born 1988)

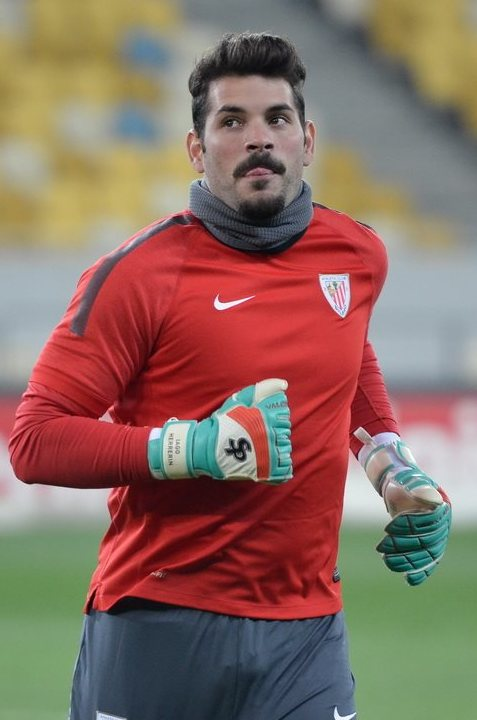
- Herrerín with Athletic Bilbao in 2014

Personal information
- Full name: Iago Herrerín Buisán
- Date of birth: 25 January 1988 (age 38)
- Place of birth: Bilbao, Spain
- Height: 1.87 m (6 ft 2 in)
- Position: Goalkeeper

Youth career
- 2000–2002: Castro
- 2002–2003: Sestao
- 2003–2005: Danok Bat
- 2005–2006: Athletic Bilbao

Senior career*
Years	Team	Apps	(Gls)
2006–2007	Basconia	8	(0)
2007	→ Barakaldo (loan)	18	(0)
2007–2010	Bilbao Athletic	87	(0)
2010–2012	Atlético Madrid B	75	(1)
2012–2021	Athletic Bilbao	56	(0)
2012–2013	→ Numancia (loan)	34	(0)
2016–2017	→ Leganés (loan)	21	(0)
2021–2022	Al Raed	13	(0)
2022–2023	Valencia	0	(0)
2023–2024	AEK Larnaca	1	(0)
2024–2025	Sestao	35	(0)
2025–2026	Olympic Charleroi	11	(0)
2026	Deportivo Pasto	9	(0)

International career
2019–2020	Basque Country	2	(0)
- * Club domestic league appearances and goals as of 14:35, 26 June 2026 (UTC)

Iago Herrerín Buisán (Spanish pronunciation: [ˈɟʝaɣo ereˈɾin]; born 25 January 1988) is a Spanish professional footballer who plays as a goalkeeper.

He spent most of his career affiliated to Athletic Bilbao, making 119 first-team appearances. He also played on loan at Numancia in the Segunda División and Leganés in La Liga.

== Club career ==
=== Athletic Bilbao ===
Born in Bilbao, Biscay, Herrerín was a product of Athletic Bilbao's youth ranks. He played a couple of months with the farm team CD Basconia, being loaned to Barakaldo CF in January 2007.

After returning, Herrerín was assigned to the reserves in the Segunda División B.

=== Atlético Madrid ===
In July 2010, Herrerín decided to leave Athletic in search for "a new life in football", signing a contract with Atlético Madrid and spending two full seasons with the reserves also in the third division.

On 8 January 2011, in a match against neighbouring Getafe CF B, he scored the 3–2 winning goal for the hosts in the 72nd minute.

=== Return to Athletic ===
Herrerín returned to Athletic Bilbao in summer 2012, signing a two-year deal and immediately being loaned to CD Numancia in a season-long move. He made his Segunda División debut on 19 August, in a 2–0 home win against Sporting de Gijón.

In July 2013, Herrerín agreed to a new contract with the Lions and was promoted to the main squad. On 23 August he played his first match in La Liga, keeping a clean sheet in the 2–0 victory over CA Osasuna at the Anoeta Stadium. He spent his first year, however, as backup to longtime incumbent Gorka Iraizoz.

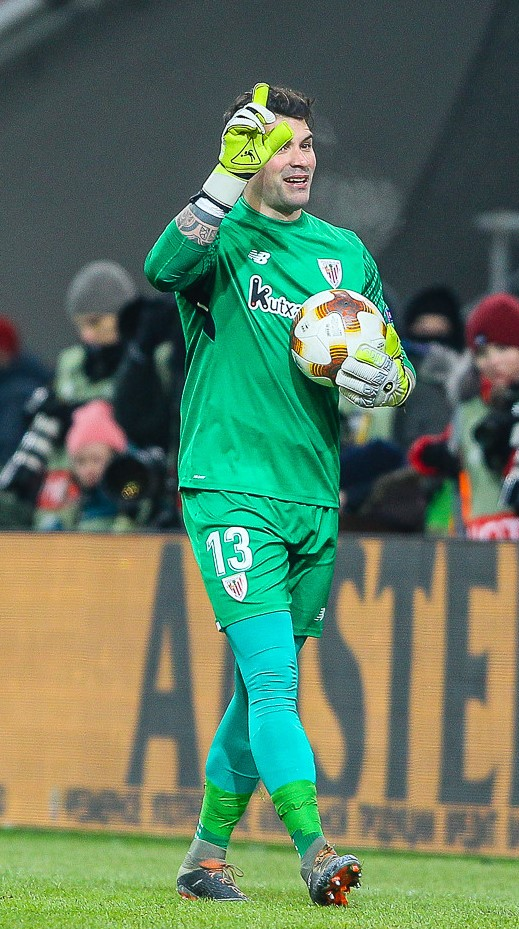
Herrerín during his second spell at Athletic Bilbao (2018)

Herrerín was first choice in the Copa del Rey in the 2014–15 campaign, helping his team to reach the final of the tournament for the first time in three years. On 25 May 2015 he signed a new deal with the club, running until 2017.

In 2015–16, Herrerín played both domestic cup and UEFA Europa League games while appearing twice in the league during Iraizoz' red card suspension. On 8 June 2016, he agreed to an extension until 2019.

On 30 November 2016, after being overtaken by Kepa Arrizabalaga, Herrerín was loaned to fellow top-tier side CD Leganés until the end of the season, mainly as a replacement for injured Jon Ander Serantes. On 19 January 2018, already back at Athletic and during a domestic league fixture away to Getafe CF, he conceded two penalties by tripping opposing forwards, saving the second kick in an eventual 2–2 draw. The previous week, he had signed a new contract until 2021.

On 7 January 2019, in a league match away to RC Celta de Vigo, a long kick upfield by Herrerín (now the first-choice goalkeeper following Arrizabalaga's departure to Chelsea) was collected by Iñaki Williams who ran on to score, making the former the first goalkeeper to register an assist in La Liga in the 21st century. He barely featured in his final two years, due to the emergence of Unai Simón.

=== Al Raed ===
On 30 August 2021, Herrerín joined Saudi Arabian club Al Raed FC. The following 15 June, he was released from his contract by mutual consent.

=== Valencia ===
Herrerín agreed to a short-term deal at Valencia CF on 26 September 2022, following a trial; the team had just lost Jaume Doménech to a serious knee injury. He made his debut the following 3 January in a 3–0 win at CF La Nucía of the Primera Federación in the Spanish Cup's last 32, playing the final 13 minutes in place of Giorgi Mamardashvili.

=== Later career ===
On 21 July 2023, Herrerín joined several compatriots at Cypriot First Division side AEK Larnaca FC, including manager José Luis Oltra. He returned to Spain in summer 2024, on a contract at Primera Federación's Sestao River Club.

== International career ==
Herrerín made his debut for the unofficial Basque Country national team in May 2019, in a 0–0 draw away to Panama for which a small, youthful and inexperienced squad was selected.

== Career statistics ==
As of match played 18 January 2026

Appearances and goals by club, season and competition
Club	Season	League			National cup		Continental		Other		Total	
Club	Season	Division	Apps	Goals	Apps	Goals	Apps	Goals	Apps	Goals	Apps	Goals
Basconia	2006–07	Tercera División	8	0	—		—		—		8	0
Barakaldo (loan)	2006–07	Segunda División B	18	0	—		—		—		18	0
Bilbao Athletic	2007–08	Segunda División B	19	0	—		—		—		19	0
Bilbao Athletic	2008–09	Segunda División B	32	0	—		—		—		32	0
Bilbao Athletic	2009–10	Segunda División B	36	0	—		—		—		36	0
Bilbao Athletic	Total		87	0	—		—		—		87	0
Atlético Madrid B	2010–11	Segunda División B	37	1	—		—		—		37	1
Atlético Madrid B	2011–12	Segunda División B	38	0	—		—		—		38	0
Atlético Madrid B	Total		75	1	—		—		—		75	1
Atlético Madrid	2010–11	La Liga	0	0	0	0	—		—		0	0
Athletic Bilbao	2013–14	La Liga	6	0	6	0	—		—		12	0
Athletic Bilbao	2014–15	La Liga	4	0	9	0	2 (Note: Appearances in UEFA Europa League)	0	—		15	0
Athletic Bilbao	2015–16	La Liga	2	0	6	0	16	0	0	0	24	0
Athletic Bilbao	2016–17	La Liga	0	0	0	0	5	0	—		5	0
Athletic Bilbao	2017–18	La Liga	8	0	1	0	14	0	—		23	0
Athletic Bilbao	2018–19	La Liga	31	0	0	0	—		—		31	0
Athletic Bilbao	2019–20	La Liga	5	0	4	0	—		—		9	0
Athletic Bilbao	2020–21	La Liga	0	0	0	0	—		—		0	0
Athletic Bilbao	Total		56	0	26	0	37	0	0	0	119	0
Numancia (loan)	2012–13	Segunda División	34	0	0	0	—		—		34	0
Leganés (loan)	2016–17	La Liga	21	0	1	0	—		—		22	0
Al Raed	2021–22	Saudi Professional League	13	0	0	0	—		—		13	0
Valencia	2022–23	La Liga	0	0	1	0	—		—		1	0
AEK Larnaca	2023–24	Cypriot First Division	1	0	0	0	—		—		1	0
Sestao	2024–25	Primera Federación	35	0	—		—		0	0	35	0
Olympic Charleroi	2025–26	Challenger Pro League	11	0	1	0	—		—		12	0
Career total			359	1	29	0	37	0	0	0	425	1

== Honours ==
Athletic Bilbao

- Supercopa de España: 2015
