= Sabin Merino =

Spanish footballer

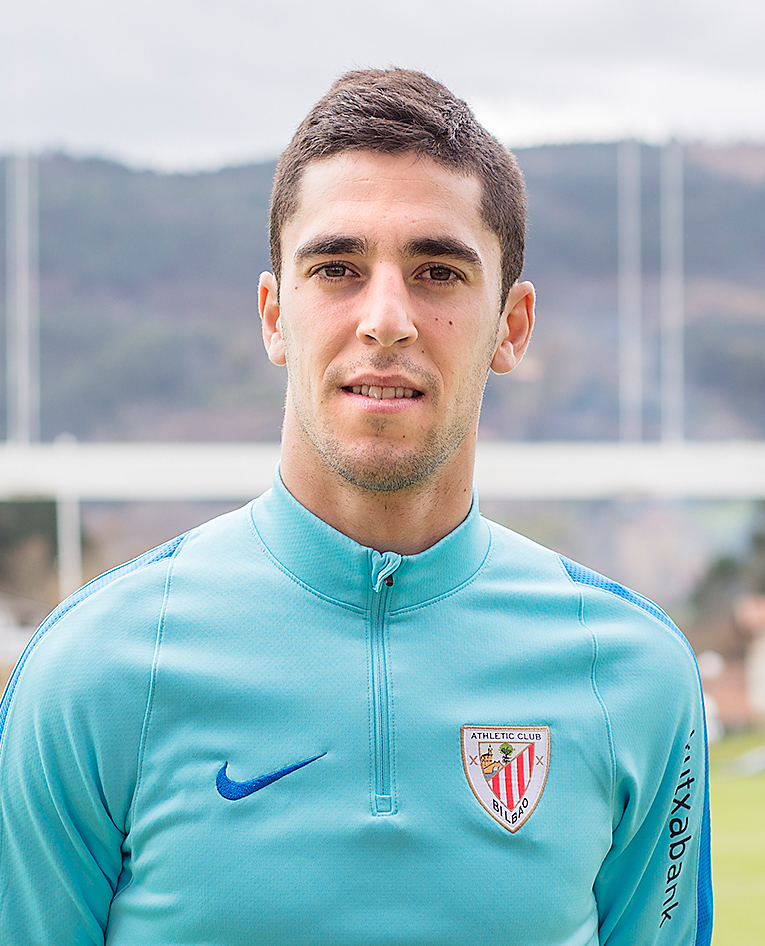
- Merino with Athletic Bilbao in 2016

Personal information
- Full name: Sabin Merino Zuloaga
- Date of birth: 4 January 1992 (age 34)
- Place of birth: Urduliz, Spain
- Height: 1.87 m (6 ft 2 in)
- Position: Winger

Team information
- Current team: Barakaldo
- Number: 10

Youth career
- 2001–2002: Danok Bat
- 2002–2005: Athletic Bilbao
- 2005–2008: Danok Bat
- 2008–2009: Javanon
- 2009–2011: Danok Bat

Senior career*
Years	Team	Apps	(Gls)
2011–2013	Basconia	70	(27)
2012–2015	Bilbao Athletic	81	(21)
2015–2019	Athletic Bilbao	48	(6)
2018–2019	→ Leganés (loan)	12	(0)
2019–2020	Leganés	2	(0)
2020	Deportivo La Coruña	18	(5)
2020–2022	Leganés	50	(11)
2022–2024	Zaragoza	16	(0)
2022–2023	→ Atlético San Luis (loan)	23	(2)
2023–2024	→ Racing Ferrol (loan)	36	(5)
2025	Saprissa	10	(1)
2025–	Barakaldo	28	(5)

International career
2016	Basque Country	2	(0)
- * Club domestic league appearances and goals as of 9 June 2026

Sabin Merino Zuloaga (Basque: [s̺aβin meɾino]; Spanish: [saˈβim meˈɾino]; born 4 January 1992) is a Spanish professional footballer who plays mainly as a left winger for Primera Federación club Barakaldo.

== Club career ==
=== Athletic Bilbao ===
Born in Urduliz, Biscay, Basque Country, Merino graduated from Danok Bat's youth academy following spells at Athletic Bilbao's Lezama and American club Javanon. He returned to the Lions in the summer of 2011, and made his debut as a senior with the farm team in the Tercera División.

On 21 June 2013, Merino reached the reserves in the Segunda División B. On 29 June 2015, after scoring a career-best 18 goals during the season as they returned to Segunda División after a 19-year absence, he was promoted to the main squad in La Liga.

Merino made his official debut with the first team on 6 August 2015, coming on as a second-half substitute for Javier Eraso in a 0–0 away draw against Inter Baku in the third qualifying round of the UEFA Europa League. After the departure of Guillermo, he was finally granted a place in the roster, being assigned #25.

Merino started the 4–0 home rout of Barcelona in the Supercopa de España on 14 August 2015 as a left winger, providing the assist for Aritz Aduriz's second goal. He scored his first at the professional level six days later, opening an eventual 3–2 Europa League playoff round loss at Žilina.

Merino scored his first goal in the Spanish top flight on 23 September 2015, in a 1–2 home defeat against Real Madrid.

=== Leganés ===
On 31 August 2018, Merino was loaned to Leganés in the same league for one year. The following May, Athletic released him and he joined the Madrid club on a permanent one-year deal.

=== Deportivo ===
Merino signed for Deportivo de La Coruña of Segunda División on 14 January 2020, agreeing to a two-and-a-half-year contract. He scored four times in his first four matches with the club, surpassing previous holder Bebeto who held the distinction since 1992; this feat earned him January's Segunda División Player of the Month award.

=== Return to Leganés ===
On 17 August 2020, after Dépor's relegation, Merino returned to Leganés. On 31 January 2022, he left as a free agent.

=== Zaragoza ===
On 31 January 2022, Merino joined fellow second-tier side Real Zaragoza on a three-and-a-half-year deal. In July, he was loaned to Atlético San Luis of the Liga MX.

On 25 July 2023, Merino went on loan to Racing de Ferrol for the upcoming season. In August of the following year, he terminated his contract with Zaragoza.

=== Later career ===
Merino moved to the Costa Rican Liga FPD in December 2024, on a deal at Deportivo Saprissa. The 33-year-old returned to both Spain and his region of birth in September 2025, joining Primera Federación club Barakaldo.

== International career ==
Merino was never capped by Spain at any level. He did feature for the unofficial Basque Country regional team.

== Honours ==
Athletic Bilbao

- Supercopa de España: 2015
