= Stefan Maderer =

German footballer (born 1996)

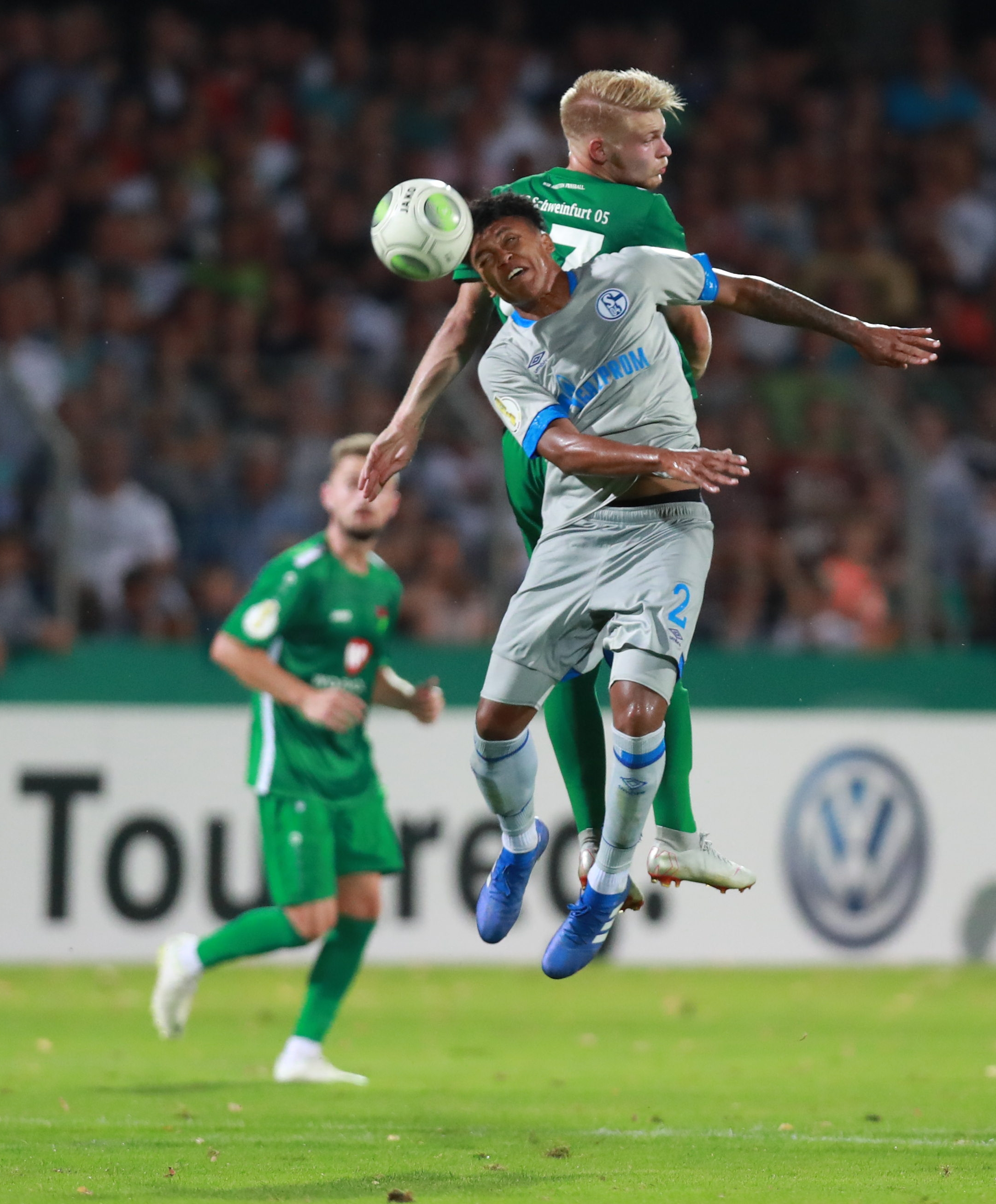
- Maderer behind Weston McKennie (2018)

Personal information
- Date of birth: 1 September 1996 (age 30)
- Place of birth: Erlangen, Germany
- Height: 1.83 m (6 ft 0 in)
- Position: Midfielder

Team information
- Current team: SV Sandhausen
- Number: 27

Youth career
- 2012–2015: SpVgg Greuther Fürth

Senior career*
Years	Team	Apps	(Gls)
2014–2016	SpVgg Greuther Fürth II	48	(20)
2015–2016	SpVgg Greuther Fürth	2	(0)
2016	→ FSV Frankfurt (loan)	1	(0)
2016–2018	SpVgg Greuther Fürth II	42	(5)
2018–2020	1. FC Schweinfurt 05	44	(9)
2020–2023	SpVgg Bayreuth	50	(13)
2023–2024	Türkgücü München	27	(8)
2024–2026	Lokomotive Leipzig	56	(30)
2026–	SV Sandhausen	4	(1)
- * Club domestic league appearances and goals as of 24 September 2026

Stefan Maderer (born 1 September 1996) is a German footballer who plays as a striker for Regionalliga club SV Sandhausen.

== Club career ==
Maderer is a youth exponent from SpVgg Greuther Fürth. He made his 2. Bundesliga debut on 27 November 2015 against 1. FC Kaiserslautern. He replaced Niko Gießelmann after 85 minutes.

== Honours ==
SpVgg Bayreuth

- Regionalliga Bayern: 2021–22
