= Mikel Balenziaga =

Spanish footballer (born 1988)

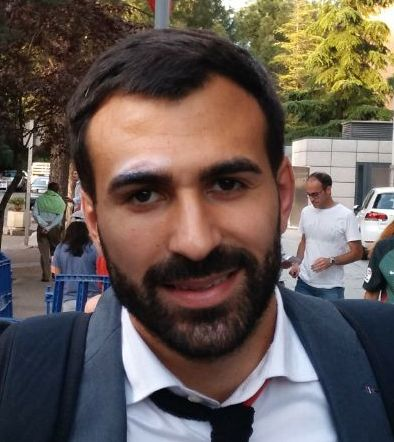
- Balenziaga in 2017

Personal information
- Full name: Mikel Balenziaga Oruesagasti
- Date of birth: 29 February 1988 (age 38)
- Place of birth: Zumarraga, Spain
- Height: 1.77 m (5 ft 10 in)
- Position: Left-back

Team information
- Current team: Eibar (assistant)

Youth career
- Real Sociedad

Senior career*
Years	Team	Apps	(Gls)
2006–2008	Real Sociedad B	53	(0)
2008–2011	Athletic Bilbao	25	(0)
2009–2010	→ Numancia (loan)	26	(0)
2011–2013	Valladolid	68	(0)
2013–2023	Athletic Bilbao	221	(1)
2023–2024	Deportivo La Coruña	32	(1)
Total		425	(2)

International career
2007	Spain U19	5	(0)
2008	Spain U21	1	(0)
2012–2020	Basque Country	7	(0)

Managerial career
- 2025–2026: Bilbao Athletic (assistant)
- 2026–: Eibar (assistant)
- * Club domestic league appearances and goals

Mikel Balenziaga Oruesagasti (Basque: [mikel balens̻iaɣa]; Spanish: [ˈmikel βalenˈθjaɣa]; (Note: In isolation, Balenziaga is pronounced [balenˈθjaɣa].) born 29 February 1988) is a Spanish former professional footballer who played as a left-back. He is currently assistant manager of Segunda División club Eibar.

He spent the better part of his career with Athletic Bilbao, totalling 321 appearances and winning two Supercopa de España.

== Club career ==
=== Athletic Bilbao ===
Born in Zumarraga, Gipuzkoa, Balenziaga started his football grooming at Real Sociedad, playing two full seasons with their B team in the Segunda División B. However, in 2008–09, he switched to neighbours Athletic Bilbao.

Initially thought of as a member of the reserves, Balenziaga quickly beat competition from veterans Koikili and Javier Casas to become the undisputed first choice for the vast majority of the campaign, making his first-team debut on 14 September 2008 in a 0–0 away draw against Málaga CF; another club graduate, Ander Iturraspe, also made his first La Liga appearance in that game.

In July 2009, Athletic bought Xabi Castillo from neighbours Real Sociedad and Balenziaga, seeing his chances for the upcoming season dim, accepted a loan move to CD Numancia, recently relegated from the top division. He transferred to Segunda División side Real Valladolid on a three-year contract in the summer of 2011, after making only one official appearance for the Lions during 2010–11's top tier.

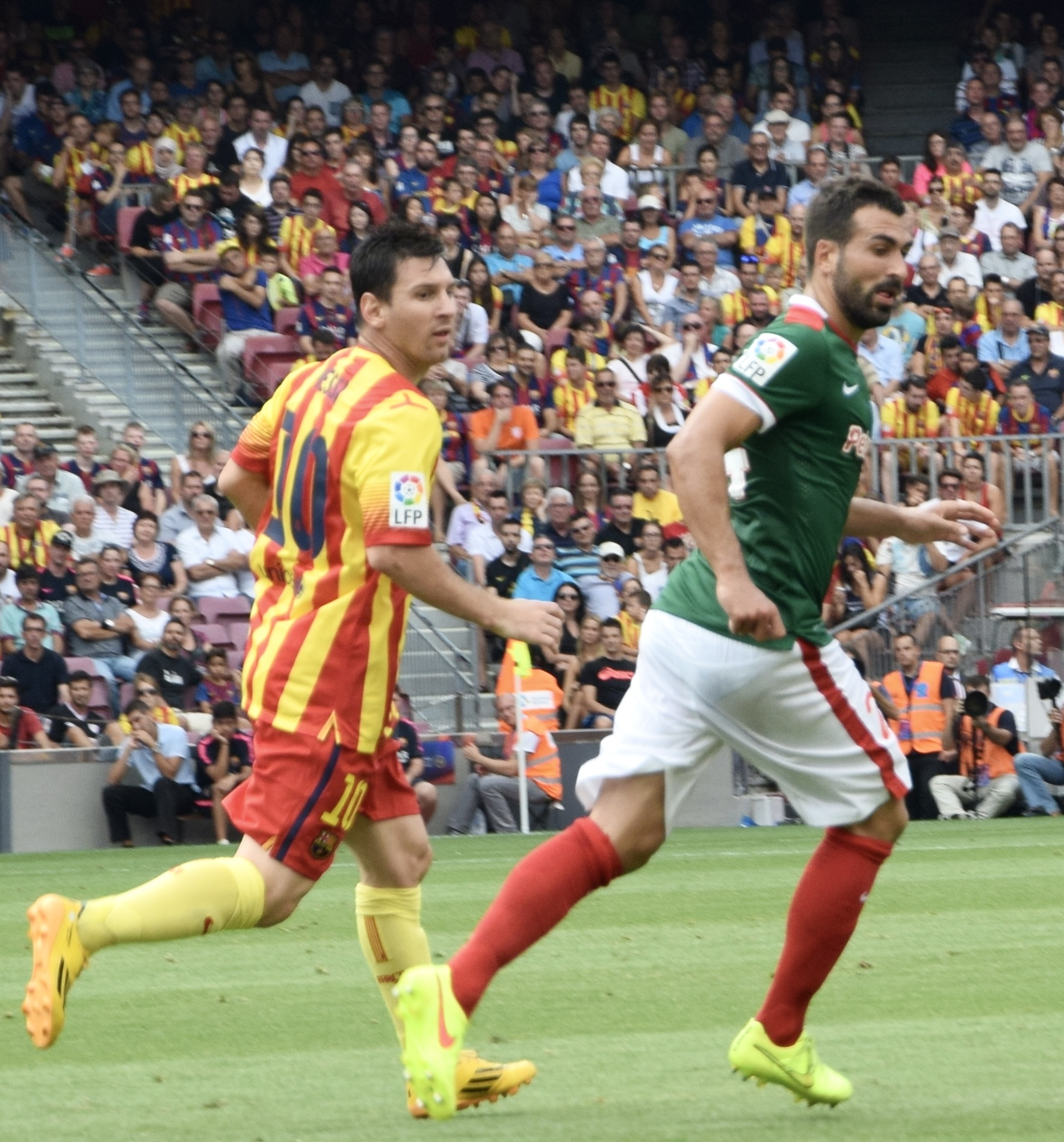
Balenziaga (right, with Lionel Messi) in action for Athletic Bilbao in 2014

After two solid years in Castile and León – Valladolid were promoted in 2011–12 via the play-offs and comfortably survived in the top flight the following campaign– Balenziaga returned to Athletic for 2013–14 to challenge for a first-team spot under new manager Ernesto Valverde. He scored his first ever goal as a professional on 24 September 2016, helping the hosts to defeat Sevilla FC 3–1 in the domestic league.

Balenziaga left the San Mamés Stadium at the end of his contract in 2023, aged 35, having played more than 300 times for the club across his two spells (a farewell ceremony after the last home fixture of the season was somewhat spoiled by the match result, a late defeat to already-relegated Elche CF which badly weakened their European qualification chances).

=== Deportivo ===
On 10 July 2023, Balenziaga signed a contract with Deportivo de La Coruña. On 10 December, he scored a rare goal to equalise a 1–1 home draw against Sestao River Club in the Primera Federación.

== International career ==
Balenziaga appeared once for the Spain under-21 team, playing 58 minutes in a 4–1 friendly away loss to Portugal on 18 November 2008. He also featured for the unofficial Basque Country regional side.

== Coaching career ==
Balenziaga retired in July 2024. Subsequently, he worked under Jokin Aranbarri as assistant at Athletic B and SD Eibar.

== Career statistics ==
As of 1 July 2023

Appearances and goals by club, season and competition
Club	Season	League			Cup		Europe		Other		Total	
Club	Season	Division	Apps	Goals	Apps	Goals	Apps	Goals	Apps	Goals	Apps	Goals
Real Sociedad B	2006–07	Segunda División B	17	0	–		–		–		17	0
Real Sociedad B	2007–08	Segunda División B	36	0	–		–		–		36	0
Real Sociedad B	Total		53	0	0	0	0	0	0	0	53	0
Athletic Bilbao	2008–09	La Liga	24	0	2	0	–		–		26	0
Athletic Bilbao	2010–11	La Liga	1	0	0	0	–		–		1	0
Athletic Bilbao	Total		25	0	2	0	0	0	0	0	27	0
Numancia (loan)	2009–10	Segunda División	26	0	0	0	–		–		26	0
Valladolid	2011–12	Segunda División	36	0	1	0	–		4 (Note: Appearances in La Liga play-offs)	0	41	0
Valladolid	2012–13	La Liga	32	0	2	0	–		–		34	0
Valladolid	Total		68	0	3	0	0	0	4	0	75	0
Athletic Bilbao	2013–14	La Liga	31	0	6	0	–		–		37	0
Athletic Bilbao	2014–15	La Liga	33	0	7	0	8 (Note: Appearances in UEFA Champions League)	0	–		48	0
Athletic Bilbao	2015–16	La Liga	34	0	4	0	11 (Note: Appearances in UEFA Europa League)	0	2 (Note: Appearances in Supercopa de España)	0	51	0
Athletic Bilbao	2016–17	La Liga	33	1	3	0	7	0	–		43	1
Athletic Bilbao	2017–18	La Liga	18	0	0	0	10	0	–		28	0
Athletic Bilbao	2018–19	La Liga	11	0	2	0	–		–		13	0
Athletic Bilbao	2019–20	La Liga	9	0	2	0	–		–		11	0
Athletic Bilbao	2020–21	La Liga	23	0	3	0	–		2	0	28	0
Athletic Bilbao	2021–22	La Liga	26	0	3	0	–		2	0	31	0
Athletic Bilbao	2022–23	La Liga	3	0	1	0	–		–		4	0
Athletic Bilbao	Total		221	1	31	0	36	0	6	0	294	1
Career total			403	1	36	0	36	0	10	0	485	1

== Honours ==
Athletic Bilbao

- Supercopa de España: 2015, 2021
- Copa del Rey runner-up: 2008–09, 2014–15, 2019–20, 2020–21
