= Javier Eraso =

Spanish footballer (born 1990)

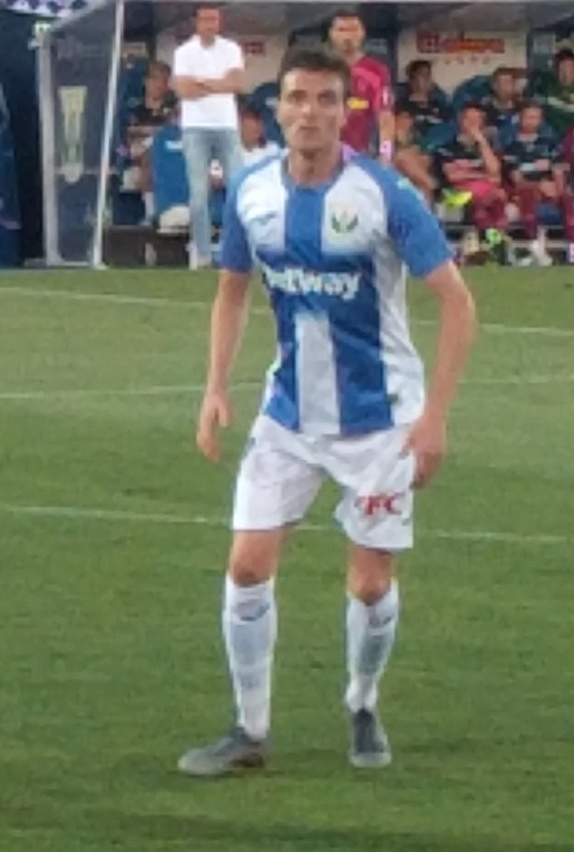
- Eraso with Leganés in 2019

Personal information
- Full name: Javier Eraso Goñi
- Date of birth: 22 March 1990 (age 36)
- Place of birth: Pamplona, Spain
- Height: 1.80 m (5 ft 11 in)
- Position: Midfielder

Youth career
- Osasuna
- 2005–2008: Athletic Bilbao

Senior career*
| Years | Team | Apps | (Gls) |
| 2008–2009 | Basconia | 22 | (1) |
| 2009–2013 | Bilbao Athletic | 108 | (11) |
| 2013–2015 | Leganés | 81 | (16) |
| 2015–2017 | Athletic Bilbao | 23 | (2) |
| 2017–2022 | Leganés | 109 | (4) |
| 2022–2023 | Akritas Chlorakas | 34 | (6) |
| 2023–2024 | Amorebieta | 23 | (2) |
| Total | | 400 | (42) |

International career
| 2015–2018 | Basque Country | 4 | (0) |
- * Club domestic league appearances and goals

Javier Eraso Goñi (Spanish pronunciation: [xaˈβjeɾ eˈɾaso]; born 22 March 1990) is a Spanish former professional footballer who played as a midfielder.

== Club career ==
Born in Pamplona, Navarre, Eraso graduated from Athletic Bilbao's youth setup, and started playing as a senior in the 2008–09 season with Basconia, in the Tercera División. One year later, he was promoted to the reserves in the Segunda División B.

On 19 June 2013, Eraso was released by the Lions and joined Leganés also of the third division the following month. He appeared in 42 games during the campaign, as the Madrid club was promoted to Segunda División after a ten-year absence.

Eraso played his first match as a professional on 7 September 2014, starting in a 3–1 home win against Mallorca. He scored his first goal in the second tier on 21 December, the last in 2–0 home victory over Recreativo de Huelva.

On 31 May 2015, Eraso scored a hat-trick in a 5–2 away rout of Barcelona B. He returned to Athletic on 1 July, now being assigned to the first team in La Liga.

Eraso made his official debut for Athletic on 30 July 2015, starting and scoring both goals in a 2–0 win against Inter Baku at the San Mamés Stadium in the third qualifying round of the UEFA Europa League. He netted his first top-flight goal on 13 February of the following year, equalising an eventual 4–2 away loss to Real Madrid.

Eraso returned to Leganés on 24 July 2017, with the side now competing in the top division. He went on to make 215 competitive appearances over two spells at the Estadio Municipal de Butarque, being relegated in 2019–20.

On 4 July 2022, Eraso moved abroad for the first time in his career, with the 32-year-old signing a two-year contract with Cypriot First Division newcomers Akritas Chlorakas. On 12 July of the following year, he returned to Spain and its second tier after agreeing to a deal at Amorebieta.

Eraso announced his retirement in July 2024.

== International career ==
Eraso did not earn any caps for Spain at any level. He did feature for the unofficial Basque Country regional team.

== Honours ==
Athletic Bilbao

- Supercopa de España: 2015
