= 2013–14 Athletic Bilbao season =

Athletic Club
2013–14 season
- President: Josu Urrutia
- Head coach: Ernesto Valverde
- Stadium: San Mamés
- La Liga: 4th
- Copa del Rey: Quarter-finals
- Top goalscorer: League: Aritz Aduriz (16); All: Aritz Aduriz (18)
Home colours	Away colours	Third colours

The 2013–14 season was Athletic Bilbao's 115th in existence and the club's 83rd consecutive season in the top flight of Spanish football.

In addition to La Liga, Athletic Bilbao also competed in the Copa del Rey, being eliminated in the quarter-finals.

== Players ==
=== Squad information ===
N	Pos.	Nat.	Name	Age	EU	Since	App	Goals	Ends	Transfer fee	Notes
1	GK	(Spain)	Gorka Iraizoz	45	EU	2007	282	0	2015	€4M	From Youth system
2	FW	(Spain)	Gaizka Toquero	42	EU	2009	198	25	2016	Undisclosed	
3	MF	(Spain)	Iñigo Pérez	38	EU	2009	58	2	2015	Youth system	
4	DF	(France)	Aymeric Laporte	32	EU	2012	49	2	2018	Youth system	
5	MF	(Spain)	Erik Morán	35	EU	2012	14	0	2016	Youth system	
6	DF	(Spain)	Mikel San José	37	EU	2009	166	18	2015	€2.74M	From Youth system
7	MF	(Spain)	Beñat	39	EU	2013	24	1	2018	€8M	From Youth system
8	MF	(Spain)	Ander Iturraspe	37	EU	2008	174	1	2017	Youth system	
9	FW	(Spain)	Kike Sola	40	EU	2013	9	1	2018	€4M	From Youth system
10	MF	(Spain)	Óscar de Marcos	37	EU	2009	180	23	2016	€0.3M	
11	DF	(Spain)	Ibai	36	EU	2010	102	15	2017	Free	From Youth system
12	DF	(Spain)	Unai Albizua	37	EU	2013	2	0	2015	Youth system	
13	GK	(Spain)	Iago Herrerín	38	EU	2012	11	0	2016	Free	From Youth system
14	MF	(Spain)	Markel Susaeta	38	EU	2007	297	43	2017	Youth system	
15	DF	(Spain)	Andoni Iraola (vice captain)	44	EU	2003	471	36	2015	Youth system	
16	DF	(Spain)	Xabier Etxeita	38	EU	2013	22	1	2016	Free	From Youth system
17	MF	(Spain)	Mikel Rico	41	EU	2013	35	7	2016	€2.8M	From Youth system
18	MF	(Spain)	Carlos Gurpegui (captain)	46	EU	2002	331	20	2015	Youth system	
19	FW	(Spain)	Iker Muniain	33	EU	2009	208	29	2015	Youth system	
20	FW	(Spain)	Aritz Aduriz	45	EU	2012	170	56	2015	€2M	From Youth system
21	MF	(Spain)	Ander Herrera	37	EU	2011	122	8	2016	€7M	
22	DF	(Spain)	Enric Saborit	34	EU	2013	5	0	2016	Youth system	
23	DF	(Spain)	Borja Ekiza	38	EU	2011	82	0	2015	Youth system	
24	DF	(Spain)	Mikel Balenziaga	38	EU	2013	58	0	2016	€0.3M	
28	FW	(Spain)	Guillermo Fernández	33	EU	2013	7	1	2014	Youth system	

- Last updated: 9 April 2014
- Source: Athletic-Club.net, Players in / out and Wikipedia players' articles

=== From the youth system ===
Note: Flags indicate national team as defined under FIFA eligibility rules; some limited exceptions apply. Players may hold more than one non-FIFA nationality.

No.	Pos.	Nation	Player
5	MF	ESP	Erik Morán
12	DF	ESP	Unai Albizua
22	DF	ESP	Enric Saborit
28	FW	ESP	Guillermo Fernández

=== Transfers in ===
No.	Pos.	Nat.	Name	Age	EU	Moving from	Type	Transfer window	Ends	Transfer fee	Source
7	MF	(Spain)	Beñat	39	EU	Betis	Transfer	Summer	2016	€8M	
24	DF	(Spain)	Mikel Balenziaga	38	EU	Valladolid	Transfer	Summer	2016	€0.3M	
13	DF	(Spain)	Iago Herrerín	38	EU	Numancia	Loan return	Summer	2014	Loan return	
16	DF	(Spain)	Xabi Etxeita	38	EU	Elche	End of contract	Summer	2016	Free	
9	FW	(Spain)	Kike Sola	40	EU	Osasuna	Transfer	Summer	2018	€4M	
17	MF	(Spain)	Mikel Rico	41	EU	Granada	Transfer	Summer	2016	€2.8M	
3	MF	(Spain)	Iñigo Pérez	38	EU	Mallorca	Loan return	Winter	2015	Loan return	

Total spending: ▼€15,100,000

=== Transfers out ===
No.	Pos.	Nat.	Name	Age	EU	Moving to	Type	Transfer window	Transfer fee	Source
9	FW	(Spain)	Fernando Llorente	41	EU	Juventus (Italy)	End of contract	Summer	Free	
5	DF	(Venezuela)	Fernando Amorebieta	41	EU	Fulham (England)	End of contract	Summer	Free	
–	DF	(Spain)	Iban Zubiaurre	43	EU	Racing Santander	Mutual termination	Summer	Free	
16	FW	(Spain)	Isma López	36	EU	Sporting Gijón	Mutual termination	Summer	Free	
26	FW	(Spain)	Igor Martínez	37	EU	Mirandés	End of contract	Summer	Free	
13	GK	(Spain)	Raúl Fernández	38	EU	Numancia	On loan	Summer	Loan	
22	DF	(Spain)	Xabi Castillo	40	EU	Las Palmas	End of contract	Summer	Free	
40	MF	(Spain)	Álvaro Peña	34	EU	Lugo	End of contract	Summer	Free	
27	MF	(Spain)	Iñigo Ruiz de Galarreta	33	EU	Mirandés	On loan	Summer	Loan	
28	DF	(Spain)	Jonás Ramalho	33	EU	Girona	On loan	Summer	Loan	
17	MF	(Spain)	Iñigo Pérez	38	EU	Mallorca	On loan	Summer	Loan	
3	DF	(Spain)	Jon Aurtenetxe	34	EU	Celta Vigo	On loan	Summer	Loan	

EU = if holds or not a European Union passport; Country: when 2 flags, 1st flag = country that plays for internationally, 2nd flag = country of birth; N = number on jersey; P = Position (for position name, pause mouse pointer on abbreviation); Name = Name on jersey (for more extensive name, pause mouse pointer on name); Age = age on the day of the signing; Moving from = only indicate the club the player was playing before start playing for this club in this season, for the type of the moving see Status column; Moving to = only indicates the club the player is going to play next, for the type of the moving see Status column; Ends = when the player's current contract ends; n/a = Not applicable.

Total income: ▲€0

Expenditure: ▼€15,100,000

== Club ==
=== Current technical staff ===
Position	Name
First team manager	Ernesto Valverde
Assistant coach	Jon Aspiazu
Physical fitness coaches	José Antonio Pozanco, Xabier Clemente
Goalkeeping coach	Aitor Iru

== Statistics ==
=== Squad statistics ===
The numbers and stats are established according to the official website: www.athletic-club.net

As of 14 April 2014

No.	Pos.	Nat.	Name	League		Cup		Total		Discipline		
No.	Pos.	Nat.	Name	Apps	Goals	Apps	Goals	Apps	Goals	Yellow card	Yellow-red card	Red card
1	GK	(Spain)	Gorka Iraizoz	33	0	0	0	33	0			
2	FW	(Spain)	Gaizka Toquero	5 (15)	0	1	0	6 (15)	0	4	1	
3	MF	(Spain)	Iñigo Pérez	0	0	0	0	0	0			
4	DF	(France)	Aymeric Laporte	33 (2)	2	3	0	36 (2)	2	6	1	
5	MF	(Spain)	Erik Morán	4 (10)	0	1 (1)	0	5 (11)	0	4	1	
6	DF	(Spain)	Mikel San José	19 (6)	5	5	0	24 (6)	5	8	1	
7	MF	(Spain)	Beñat	12 (11)	1	1 (3)	0	13 (14)	1	4		
8	MF	(Spain)	Ander Iturraspe	31 (2)	0	5	0	36 (2)	0	9		
9	FW	(Spain)	Kike Sola	2 (3)	1	2 (2)	0	4 (5)	1			
10	MF	(Spain)	Óscar de Marcos	19 (16)	5	2 (2)	0	21 (18)	5	3		
11	FW	(Spain)	Ibai	6 (12)	8	4 (2)	0	10 (14)	8			
12	DF	(Spain)	Unai Albizua	0 (4)	0	0	0	0 (4)	0			
13	GK	(Spain)	Iago Herrerín	5 (1)	0	6	0	11 (1)	0	1		
14	MF	(Spain)	Markel Susaeta	34 (4)	6	4 (1)	1	38 (5)	7	1		
15	DF	(Spain)	Andoni Iraola	28 (6)	1	6	0	34 (6)	1	5		
16	DF	(Spain)	Xabier Etxeita	2 (1)	0	0	0	2 (1)	0			
17	MF	(Spain)	Mikel Rico	31 (3)	5	6	2	37 (3)	7	10		
18	MF	(Spain)	Carlos Gurpegui (c)	27	2	4 (1)	0	31 (1)	2	9		
19	FW	(Spain)	Iker Muniain	33 (3)	7	3 (1)	2	36 (4)	9	8		
20	FW	(Spain)	Aritz Aduriz	26 (5)	16	3 (2)	2	29 (7)	18	9	1	1
21	MF	(Spain)	Ander Herrera	31 (2)	5	4 (2)	0	35 (4)	5	7		
22	DF	(Spain)	Enric Saborit	2 (3)	0	0	0	2 (3)	0	1		
23	DF	(Spain)	Borja Ekiza	1	0	0 (1)	0	1 (1)	0			
24	DF	(Spain)	Mikel Balenziaga	31	0	6	0	37	0	5		
28	FW	(Spain)	Guillermo Fernández	4 (5)	1	0	0	4 (5)	1			

== Competitions ==
=== Pre-season ===
Win Draw Loss

13 July 2013 Friendly	Bermeo	1–6	Athletic Bilbao	Bermeo, Spain
19:00 CEST			De Marcos 9', 12'; Aduriz 40'; Toquero 84'; Sola 85'; Beñat 90'	Stadium: Municipal Itsas Gane

20 July 2013 Friendly	Eintracht Braunschweig	0–4	Athletic Bilbao	Kufstein, Austria
19:45 CEST		Summary	Susaeta 19'; Ruiz de Galarreta 27'; Aduriz 47'; De Marcos 75'	Stadium: Kufstein Arena

23 July 2013 Friendly	1899 Hoffenheim	0–0	Athletic Bilbao	Leogang, Austria
	Firmino (yellow card) 82'; Beck (yellow card) 82'	Summary	Herrera (yellow card) 72'	Stadium: Sportplatz Leogang; Referee: (Austria) Christopher Jäger

27 July 2013 Friendly	SC Freiburg	0–0	Athletic Bilbao	Freiburg im Breisgau, Germany
18:30 CEST	Guédé (yellow card) 19'	Summary	Balenziaga (yellow card) 46'; Susaeta (yellow card) 76'	Stadium: Mage Solar Stadion; Referee: (Germany) Martin Petersen

31 July 2013 Friendly	Athletic Bilbao	1–4	Real Zaragoza	Sestao, Spain
19:00 CEST	Toquero 61'	Summary	Cidoncha 25'; García 32'; Barkero 35', 60'	Stadium: Las Llanas; Referee: (Spain) González Esteban

3 August 2013 Friendly	Nice	0–0	Athletic Bilbao	Saint-Jean-de-Luz, France
18:00 CEST		Summary	Susaeta (yellow card) 60'; Gurpegui (yellow card) 77'	Stadium: Pavillon Bleu; Referee: (France) Said Ennjimi

7 August 2013 Friendly	Numancia	0–2	Athletic Bilbao	Soria, Spain
20:30 CEST	Juanma (yellow card) 64'	Summary	Sola 58'; Ibai 63'	Stadium: Los Pajaritos; Referee: (Spain) Valdés Aller

10 August 2013 Friendly	Cardiff City	2–1	Athletic Bilbao	Cardiff, Wales
15:00 BST	Whittingham 45'; Campbell 52'	Summary	Iraola 55'	Stadium: Cardiff City Stadium; Referee: (England) Mark Whitby

=== La Liga ===
==== League table ====
Pos	Team	Pld	W	D	L	GF	GA	GD	Pts	Qualification or relegation
2	Barcelona	38	27	6	5	100	33	+67	87 (Note: Barcelona finished ahead of Real Madrid on head-to-head points: Barcelona 2–1 Real Madrid, Real Madrid 3–4 Barcelona.)	Qualification for the Champions League group stage
3	Real Madrid	38	27	6	5	104	38	+66	87	Qualification for the Champions League group stage
4	Athletic Bilbao	38	20	10	8	66	39	+27	70	Qualification for the Champions League play-off round
5	Sevilla	38	18	9	11	69	52	+17	63	Qualification for the Europa League group stage (Note: Sevilla automatically qualified for the 2014–15 UEFA Europa League group stage as the defending champions; the berth through their league position was vacated.)
6	Villarreal	38	17	8	13	60	44	+16	59 (Note: Villarreal finished ahead of Real Sociedad on head-to-head points: Villarreal 5–1 Real Sociedad, Real Sociedad 1–2 Villarreal.)	Qualification for the Europa League play-off round (Note: Since both the 2013–14 Copa del Rey champions (Real Madrid) and runners-up (Barcelona) qualified for the 2014–15 UEFA Champions League, the 5th, 6th and 7th placed teams qualified for the group stage, play-off round and third qualifying round of the 2014–15 UEFA Europa League respectively.)

Source: La Liga, ESPN
Rules for classification: 1st points; 2nd head-to-head points;

==== Results by round ====
Round	1	2	3	4	5	6	7	8	9	10	11	12	13	14	15	16	17	18	19	20	21	22	23	24	25	26	27	28	29	30	31	32	33	34	35	36	37	38
Ground	A	H	A	H	A	H	A	H	H	A	H	A	H	A	H	A	H	A	H	H	A	H	A	H	A	H	A	A	H	A	H	A	H	A	H	A	H	A
Result	W	W	L	W	L	W	L	D	W	W	D	L	W	W	W	D	W	L	W	W	W	D	D	L	W	W	D	D	W	D	L	W	W	L	W	W	D	D
Position	6	3	5	5	6	5	5	6	6	5	5	5	5	5	4	4	4	4	4	4	4	4	4	4	4	4	4	4	4	4	4	4	4	4	4	4	4	4

A = Away; H = Home; W = Win; D = Draw; L = Loss

==== Matches ====
Kickoff times are in CET. Win Draw Loss

17 August 2013 1	Real Valladolid	1–2	Athletic Bilbao	Valladolid
21:00	Ebert 31'	Report	Susaeta 28'; Muniain 50'	Stadium: José Zorrilla; Attendance: 20,000; Referee: Miguel Ayza Gámez (Valencian Community)

23 August 2013 2	Athletic Bilbao	2–0	Osasuna	San Sebastián
22:00	Arribas 30' (o.g.); De Marcos 81'	Report		Stadium: Anoeta; Attendance: 20,000; Referee: César Muñiz Fernández (Asturias)

1 September 2013 3	Real Madrid	3–1	Athletic Bilbao	Madrid
12:00	Isco 26', 72'; Khedira (yellow card) 29'; Ronaldo 45+1'	Report	Gurpegui (yellow card) 21'; Beñat (yellow card) 67'; Ibai 79'	Stadium: Santiago Bernabéu; Attendance: 72,231; Referee: Carlos Clos Gómez (Aragon)

16 September 2013 4	Athletic Bilbao	3–2	Celta Vigo	Bilbao
22:00	San José 17'; Iraola 61'; Beñat 68'	Report	Charles 11'; Mina 79'	Stadium: San Mamés; Attendance: 33,000; Referee: Jesús Gil Manzano (Extremadura)

23 September 2013 5	Espanyol	3–2	Athletic Bilbao	Cornellà de Llobregat
22:00	Sánchez 24', 49'; García 66'	Report	Ibai 92'	Stadium: Cornellà-El Prat; Attendance: 20,000; Referee: Juan Martínez Munuera (Valencian Community)

26 September 2013 6	Athletic Bilbao	2–1	Real Betis	Bilbao
20:00	De Marcos 72'; San José 81'	Report	Molina 11'	Stadium: San Mamés; Attendance: 32,000; Referee: Ignacio Iglesias Villanueva (Galicia)

30 September 2013 7	Granada	2–0	Athletic Bilbao	Granada
22:00	El-Arabi 51' (pen.), 60'	Report		Stadium: Los Cármenes; Attendance: 10,000; Referee: Alfonso Álvarez Izquierdo (Catalonia)

6 October 2013 8	Athletic Bilbao	1–1	Valencia	Bilbao
21:00	Rico 52'	Report	Banega 42' (pen.)	Stadium: San Mamés; Attendance: 35,700; Referee: Carlos del Cerro Grande (Community of Madrid)

21 October 2013 9	Athletic Bilbao	2–0	Villarreal	Bilbao
22:00	Rico 32'; Aduriz 35'	Report		Stadium: San Mamés; Attendance: 30,000; Referee: José Antonio Teixeira Vitienes (Cantabria)

28 October 2013 10	Getafe	0–1	Athletic Bilbao	Getafe
22:00		Report	Laporte 8'	Stadium: Coliseum Alfonso Pérez; Attendance: 6,543; Referee: Jesús Gil Manzano (Extremadura)

31 October 2013 11	Athletic Bilbao	2–2	Elche	Bilbao
22:00	Susaeta 49'; Aduriz 69'	Report	Lombán 9'; Aarón 47'	Stadium: San Mamés; Attendance: 27,500; Referee: Pedro Pérez Montero (Andalusia)

3 November 2013 12	Atlético Madrid	2–0	Athletic Bilbao	Madrid
17:00	Villa 32'; Costa 40'	Report	Morán (yellow card) 63' (yellow-red card) 79'	Stadium: Vicente Calderón; Attendance: 52,000; Referee: Fernando Teixeira Vitienes (Cantabria)

9 November 2013 13	Athletic Bilbao	2–1	Levante	Bilbao
20:00	Laporte (yellow card) 42'; Beñat (yellow card) 43'; De Marcos (yellow card) 68'; Rico 72'; Aduriz 84', (red card) 90+2'	Report	López (yellow card) 11'; Barral 32', (yellow card) 63'; Ivanschitz (yellow card) 60'; Rodas (yellow card) 80'; Diop (yellow card) 81'; Nong (yellow card) 90+6'	Stadium: San Mamés; Attendance: 34,000; Referee: David Fernández Borbalán (Andalusia)

25 November 2013 14	Málaga	1–2	Athletic Bilbao	Málaga
22:00	Samu (yellow card) 30'; Juanmi 38'; Weligton (yellow card) 41'; Angeleri (yellow card) 56'; Eliseu (yellow card) 71'; Portillo (yellow card) 76' (yellow-red card) 83'	Report	San José (yellow card) 45', (goal) 69'; Muniain 86'	Stadium: La Rosaleda; Attendance: 25,000; Referee: Ignacio Iglesias Villanueva (Galicia)

1 December 2013 15	Athletic Bilbao	1–0	Barcelona	Bilbao
21:00	Rico (yellow card) 19'; Iturraspe (yellow card) 56'; Toquero (yellow card) 69'; Muniain 70'	Report	Neymar (yellow card) 53'; Busquets (yellow card) 57'; Mascherano (yellow card) 72'; Adriano (yellow card) 78'	Stadium: San Mamés; Attendance: 35,000; Referee: Juan Martínez Munuera (Valencian Community)

15 December 2013 16	Sevilla	1–1	Athletic Bilbao	Seville
19:00	Moreno 4'; Figueiras (yellow card) 34'; Bacca (yellow card) 45'; Vitolo (yellow card) 55'; Mbia (yellow card) 85'	Report	Susaeta 6'; Gurpegui (yellow card) 38'; Iturraspe (yellow card) 90'	Stadium: Ramón Sánchez Pizjuán; Referee: Alberto Undiano Mallenco (Navarre)

22 December 2013 17	Athletic Bilbao	2–1	Rayo Vallecano	Bilbao
19:00	San José 32'; Rico 75'	Report	Bueno 61'	Stadium: San Mamés; Referee: Eduardo Prieto Iglesias (Navarre)

5 January 2014 18	Real Sociedad	2–0	Athletic Bilbao	San Sebastián
20:00	Griezmann 43'; Pardo 90+3'	Report		Stadium: Anoeta; Referee: Pedro Pérez Montero (Andalusia)

12 January 2014 19	Athletic Bilbao	6–1	Almería	Bilbao
16:00	Rico 6', (yellow card) 83'; Herrera 10'; Laporte 30'; San José (yellow card) 33'; Aduriz 52'; Ibai 67', 85' (pen.)	Report	Torsiglieri (yellow card) 36'; Barbosa 75'	Stadium: San Mamés; Referee: Jesús Gil Manzano (Extremadura)

19 January 2014 20	Athletic Bilbao	4–2	Real Valladolid	Bilbao
22:00	Ibai 65', 82'; De Marcos 75'; Herrera 86'	Report	Óscar 15'; Rama 90+1'	Stadium: San Mamés; Referee: Xavier Estrada Fernández (Catalonia)

26 January 2014 21	Osasuna	1–5	Athletic Bilbao	Pamplona
17:00	Armenteros 10'	Report	Susaeta 3'; Aduriz 16', 62'; Ibai 84'; Sola 88'	Stadium: El Sadar; Referee: Carlos Velasco Carballo (Community of Madrid)

2 February 2014 22	Athletic Bilbao	1–1	Real Madrid	Bilbao
21:00	Ibai 74'; Iturraspe (yellow card) 75'	Report	Jesé 65'; Ronaldo (red card) 75'	Stadium: San Mamés; Referee: Miguel Ayza Gámez (Valencian Community)

10 February 2014 23	Celta Vigo	0–0	Athletic Bilbao	Vigo
22:00		Report		Stadium: Balaídos; Referee: Carlos del Cerro Grande (Community of Madrid)

16 February 2014 24	Athletic Bilbao	1–2	Espanyol	Bilbao
19:00	Gurpegui 56'; Aduriz (yellow card) 31' (yellow-red card) 87'	Report	García 6'; Colotto 65'	Stadium: San Mamés; Referee: Alberto Undiano Mallenco (Navarre)

23 February 2014 25	Real Betis	0–2	Athletic Bilbao	Seville
17:00	Castro (yellow card) 32'; Perquis (yellow card) 34' (yellow-red card) 41'; Reyes (yellow card) 34' (yellow-red card) 58'; Sevilla (yellow card) 55'	Report	Muniain 34' (pen.), (yellow card) 78'; Guillermo 80'	Stadium: Benito Villamarín; Referee: Jesús Gil Manzano (Extremadura)

28 February 2014 26	Athletic Bilbao	4–0	Granada	Bilbao
20:30	Aduriz 7', 18', 74' (pen.); Gurpegui 80'	Report	Fatau (yellow card) 2'; Brahimi (yellow card) 47'; Mainz (red card) 73'	Stadium: San Mamés; Referee: Alfonso Álvarez Izquierdo (Catalonia)

9 March 2014 27	Valencia	1–1	Athletic Bilbao	Valencia
21:00	Alcácer 23'	Report	Aduriz 52' (pen.)	Stadium: Mestalla; Referee: David Fernández Borbalán (Andalusia)

17 March 2014 28	Villarreal	1–1	Athletic Bilbao	Villarreal
22:00	Pina 46'; Gabriel (yellow card) 39' (yellow-red card) 65'	Report	Aduriz 83'	Stadium: El Madrigal; Referee: José González González (Castile and León)

22 March 2014 29	Athletic Bilbao	1–0	Getafe	Bilbao
22:00	Susaeta 40'	Report		Stadium: San Mamés; Referee: Fernando Teixeira Vitienes (Cantabria)

25 March 2014 30	Elche	0–0	Athletic Bilbao	Elche
22:00		Report		Stadium: Martínez Valero; Referee: Eduardo Prieto Iglesias (Navarre)

29 March 2014 31	Athletic Bilbao	1–2	Atlético Madrid	Bilbao
20:00	Muniain 6'; Laporte (yellow card) 71' (yellow-red card) 85'	Report	Costa 22'; Koke 55'	Stadium: San Mamés; Referee: José Antonio Teixeira Vitienes (Cantabria)

7 April 2014 32	Levante	1–2	Athletic Bilbao	Valencia
22:00	García (yellow card) 61'; San José 66' (o.g.); Víctor (yellow card) 72'; Barral (yellow card) 88'		Aduriz 15', 45'; Morán (yellow card) 87'	Stadium: Ciutat de València; Referee: Xavier Estrada Fernández (Catalonia)

14 April 2014 33	Athletic Bilbao	3–0	Málaga	Bilbao
22:00	Aduriz 4', 46'; Herrera 62'	Report		Stadium: San Mamés; Referee: José González González (Castile and León)

20 April 2014 34	Barcelona	2–1	Athletic Bilbao	Barcelona
21:00	Pedro 72'; Messi 74'	Report	Aduriz 50'	Stadium: Camp Nou; Referee: Juan Martínez Munuera (Valencian Community)

27 April 2014 35	Athletic Bilbao	3–1	Sevilla	Bilbao
19:00	Susaeta 4'; Muniain 53'; Herrera 72'	Report	Gameiro 79'	Stadium: San Mamés; Referee: Alfonso Álvarez Izquierdo (Catalonia)

2 May 2014 36	Rayo Vallecano	0–3	Athletic Bilbao	Madrid
21:00	Larrivey (yellow card) 45+4'	Report	San José 20'; De Marcos 30'; Herrera 74'	Stadium: Campo de Vallecas; Attendance: 12,500; Referee: David Fernández Borbalán (Andalusia)

11 May 2014 37	Athletic Bilbao	1–1	Real Sociedad	Bilbao
17:00	Muniain 49'	Report	Agirretxe 79'	Stadium: San Mamés; Referee: Carlos del Cerro Grande (Community of Madrid)

18 May 2014 38	Almería	0–0	Athletic Bilbao	Almería
18:00		Report		Stadium: Juegos del Mediterráneo; Referee: Xavier Estrada Fernández (Catalonia)

=== Copa del Rey ===
==== Round of 32 ====
7 December 2013 First leg	Celta Vigo	1–0	Athletic Bilbao	Vigo
20:00	Mina 72'			Stadium: Balaídos; Referee: Pedro Pérez Montero (Andalusia)

18 December 2013 Second leg	Athletic Bilbao	4–0	Celta Vigo	Bilbao
21:30	Muniain 20', 79'; Susaeta 43'; Aduriz 85'			Stadium: San Mamés; Referee: Fernando Teixeira Vitienes (Cantabria)

==== Round of 16 ====
8 January 2014 First leg	Real Betis	1–0	Athletic Bilbao	Seville
20:00	Castro 42'	Report		Stadium: Benito Villamarín; Referee: Alfonso Álvarez Izquierdo (Catalonia)

15 January 2014 Second leg	Athletic Bilbao	2–0	Real Betis	Bilbao
19:30	Rico 23', 67'	Report		Stadium: San Mamés; Referee: Carlos del Cerro Grande (Community of Madrid)

==== Quarter-finals ====
23 January 2014 First leg	Atlético Madrid	1–0	Athletic Bilbao	Madrid
21:00	Godín 40'			Stadium: Vicente Calderón; Referee: David Fernández Borbalán (Andalusia)

29 January 2014 Second leg	Athletic Bilbao	1–2	Atlético Madrid	Bilbao
20:00	Aduriz 42'	Report	García 55'; Costa 86'	Stadium: San Mamés; Referee: Antonio Mateu Lahoz (Valencian Community)
