= 2011–12 Athletic Bilbao season =

Athletic Bilbao
2011–12 season
- President: Josu Urrutia
- Head coach: Marcelo Bielsa
- Stadium: San Mamés
- La Liga: 10th
- Copa del Rey: Runners-up
- UEFA Europa League: Runners-up
- Top goalscorer: League: Fernando Llorente (17); All: Fernando Llorente (29)
Home colours	Away colours

The 2011–12 season was the 111th season in Athletic Bilbao's history and their 81st consecutive season in La Liga, the top division of Spanish football. It covers a period from 1 July 2011 to 30 June 2012.

Athletic Bilbao competed for their ninth La Liga title and participated in the UEFA Europa League, entering in the play-off round due to their sixth-place finish in the 2010–11 La Liga. They also entered the Copa del Rey in the Round of 32.

== Players ==
=== Squad information ===
N	Pos.	Nat.	Name	Age	EU	Since	App	Goals	Ends	Transfer fee	Notes
1	GK	(Spain)	Gorka Iraizoz	45	EU	2007	150	0	2015	€4.6M	Originally from Youth system
2	FW	(Spain)	Gaizka Toquero	42	EU	2008	103	20	2012	Free	
3	DF	(Spain)	Jon Aurtenetxe	34	EU	2010	13	0	2014	Youth system	
5	CB	(Venezuela)	Fernando Amorebieta	41	EU	2005	187	1	2013	Youth system	Second nationality: Spain
6	CB	(Spain)	Mikel San José	37	EU	2010	64	5	2015	€2.5M	Originally from Youth system
7	MF	(Spain)	David López	44	EU	2007	125	14	2013	€6M	
8	DM	(Spain)	Ander Iturraspe	37	EU	2008	42	0	2012	Youth system	
9	ST	(Spain)	Fernando Llorente	41	EU	2004	244	84	2013	Youth system	
10	FW	(Spain)	Óscar de Marcos	37	EU	2009	44	3	2013	€0.35M	
11	LM	(Spain)	Igor Gabilondo	47	EU	2006	154	21	2012	Free	
12	LB	(Spain)	Koikili	45	EU	2007	98	2	2012	Free	
13	GK	(Spain)	Raúl	38	EU	2010	1	0	2012	Youth system	
14	RW	(Spain)	Markel Susaeta	38	EU	2007	151	12	2013	Youth system	
15	RB	(Spain)	Andoni Iraola	43	EU	2003	334	34	2014	Youth system	
18	DM	(Spain)	Carlos Gurpegui	46	EU	2001	256	17	2014	Youth system	
19	LW	(Spain)	Iker Muniain	33	EU	2009	73	11	2015	Youth system	
20	CB	(Spain)	Aitor Ocio	49	EU	2007	119	2	2012	€3.5M	
21	MF	(Spain)	Ander Herrera	37	EU	2011	0	0	2016	€7.5M	
22	LB	(Spain)	Xabi Castillo	40	EU	2009	45	0	2013	€1M	Originally from Youth system
23	CB	(Spain)	Borja Ekiza	38	EU	2010	21	0	2013	Youth system	
24	CM	(Spain)	Javi Martínez	38	EU	2006	197	23	2016	€6M	
26	AM	(Spain)	Igor Martínez	37	EU	2010	10	0	2013	€0.2M	
28	FW	(Spain)	Ibai	38	EU	2010	3	0		€0.2M (estimate)	

- Last updated: 6 July 2011
- Source: Athletic-Club.net, Players transfer, Wikipedia players' articles (for player numbers, appearances, and goals)
- Ordered by squad number.

=== Transfers ===
==== In ====
No.	Pos.	Nat.	Name	Age	EU	Moving from	Type	Transfer window	Ends	Transfer fee	Source
	RB	(Spain)	Iban Zubiaurre	28	EU	Albacete	Loan return	Summer	2014	N/A	
	FW	(Spain)	Ion Vélez	26	EU	Numancia	Loan return	Summer	2012	N/A	
	MF	(Spain)	Ander Herrera	21	EU	Zaragoza	Transfer	Summer	2016	Unknown	Marca.com
	MF	(Spain)	Iñigo Pérez	23	EU	Huesca	Loan return	Summer	2012	N/A	

Total expenditure: ▼€0 million

==== Out ====
No.	Pos.	Nat.	Name	Age	EU	Moving to	Type	Transfer window	Transfer fee	Source

Total income: ▲€0 million

== Club ==
=== Coaching staff ===
Position	Staff
Head coach	Marcelo Bielsa
2nd coach	Luciano Martín
Physical coaches	Javier Reyes, Bernardo Requena, Xabier Clemente
Goalkeepers coach	Luis Llopis
Representative	Iñaki Morán
Medical services	Joxean Lekue, Paco Angulo
Physiotherapists	Juan Manuel Ipiña, Alfonso Ruiz, Álvaro Campa, Beñat Azula
Chiropractor	Kepa Galardi
Material managers	José Antonio Narváez, Txetxu Gallego

Source: Athletic-Club.net

== La Liga ==
=== League table ===
Pos	Team	Pld	W	D	L	GF	GA	GD	Pts	Qualification or relegation
8	Mallorca	38	14	10	14	42	46	−4	52	
9	Sevilla	38	13	11	14	48	47	+1	50	
10	Athletic Bilbao	38	12	13	13	49	52	−3	49	Qualification for the Europa League third qualifying round (Note: Athletic Bilbao qualified for the third qualifying round of the 2012–13 UEFA Europa League as runners-up of the 2011–12 Copa del Rey to Barcelona, who have qualified for the 2012–13 UEFA Champions League. Consequently, Levante entered the play-off round.)
11	Getafe	38	12	11	15	40	51	−11	47 (Note: GET: 8 pts; RSO: 5 pts; BET: 2 pts)	
12	Real Sociedad	38	12	11	15	46	52	−6	47	

Source: ESPN
Rules for classification: 1st points; 2nd head-to-head points; 3rd head-to-head goal difference; 4th head-to-head goals scored; 5th goal difference; 6th number of goals scored; 7th Fair-play points

=== Results by round ===
Round	2	3	4	5	6	7	8	9	10	11	12	13	14	15	16	17	18	19	1	21	22	23	24	25	26	27	28	29	29	31	32	33	34	35	36	20	37	38
Ground	H	A	H	A	H	A	H	A	H	A	H	A	H	A	H	H	A	H	A	A	H	A	H	A	H	A	H	A	H	A	H	A	H	A	A	H	H	A
Result	D	L	L	L	D	W	W	D	W	D	D	W	L	D	D	W	D	W	L	W	D	L	W	D	W	L	L	L	D	L	W	D	W	W	L	L	D	L
Position	8	14	16	18	19	16	11	11	8	9	9	7	8	9	9	9	9	5	7	6	6	9	5	5	5	7	8	9	11	11	11	8	7	6	7	8	9	10

Source: La Liga
A = Away; H = Home; W = Win; D = Draw; L = Loss

=== Matches ===
Win Draw Loss Postponed

21 August 2011 1	Real Madrid	v	Athletic Bilbao	Madrid
18:00 CET				Stadium: Santiago Bernabéu; Referee: Antonio Miguel Mateu Lahoz

28 August 2011 2	Athletic Bilbao	1 – 1	Rayo Vallecano	Bilbao
16:00 CET	Iturraspe 56'; Iturraspe (yellow card) 90+1'	Summary	Movilla 62'; Arribas (yellow card) 73'; Piti (yellow card) 74'; Casado (yellow card) 77'	Stadium: San Mamés; Attendance: 35,000; Referee: José Antonio Teixeira Vitienes

11 September 2011 3	Espanyol	2 – 1	Athletic Bilbao	Cornellà de Llobregat
21:00 CET	López (yellow card) 7'; García 25', 74', (yellow card) 53'	Summary	De Marcos (yellow card) 8'; Llorente 62'	Stadium: Cornellà-El Prat; Attendance: 26,000; Referee: Carlos Velasco Carballo

18 September 2011 4	Athletic Bilbao	2 – 3	Real Betis	Bilbao
21:00 CET	De Marcos 38', (yellow card) 45'; Gurpegui (yellow card) 51'; Amorebieta (yellow card) 53' (yellow-red card) 90+5'; Muniain (yellow card) 75'; López 86' (pen.)	Summary	Beñat 7', (yellow card) 72'; Nacho 13', (yellow card) 24'; Iriney (yellow card) 41'; Sevilla 45' (pen.); Mario (yellow card) 75', (red card) 75'; Casto (yellow card) 78'; Chica (yellow card) 86'	Stadium: San Mamés; Attendance: 30,000; Referee: Miguel Ángel Ayza Gámez

21 September 2011 5	Málaga	1 – 0	Athletic Bilbao	Málaga
19:00 CET	Cazorla 62', (yellow card) 76'	Summary	Iturraspe (yellow card) 61'; Toquero (yellow card) 84'; J. Martínez (yellow card) 88'	Stadium: La Rosaleda; Attendance: 20,976; Referee: Fernando Teixeira Vitienes

24 September 2011 6	Athletic Bilbao	1 – 1	Villarreal	Bilbao
17:00 CET	Gabilondo 43'; Eikiza (yellow card) 45' (yellow-red card) 81'; Amorebieta (yellow card) 56'; J. Martínez (yellow card) 60'; Muniain (yellow card) 86'	Summary	Nilmar 53'; Musacchio (yellow card) 58'	Stadium: San Mamés; Attendance: 37,000; Referee: Ignacio Iglesias Villanueva

2 October 2011 7	Real Sociedad	1 – 2	Athletic Bilbao	San Sebastián
11:00 CET	I. Martínez 61'; Illarramendi (yellow card) 68'	Summary	Llorente 34', 70'; Amorebieta (yellow card) 49'; Iraola (yellow card) 73'; Gurpegui (yellow card) 75'; Susaeta (yellow card) 84'	Stadium: Anoeta; Attendance: 25,000; Referee: David Fernández Borbalán

17 October 2011 8	Athletic Bilbao	3 – 1	Osasuna	Bilbao
20:00 CET	Iraola (yellow card) 27'; Muniain 30'; Gabilondo 38'; J. Martínez 45+1', (yellow card) 90'	Summary	Nekounam (yellow card) 26', (goal) 90+1' (pen.); Lamah (yellow card) 63' (yellow-red card) 70'	Stadium: San Mamés; Attendance: 27,000; Referee: Javier Estrada Fernández

23 October 2011 9	Valencia	1 – 1	Athletic Bilbao	Valencia
19:00 CET	Soldado (yellow card) 25', (goal) 89'; Ruiz (yellow card) 31'; Miguel (yellow card) 74'	Summary	J. Martínez (yellow card) 41'; Iraola (yellow card) 45+2'; Herrera (yellow card) 71'; Muniain 72'; Iturraspe (yellow card) 78'; Aurtenetxe (yellow card) 89'	Stadium: Mestalla; Attendance: 27,532; Referee: Carlos Clos Gómez

27 October 2011 10	Athletic Bilbao	3 – 0	Atlético Madrid	Bilbao
21:00 CET	J. Martínez (yellow card) 17'; Aurtenetxe (yellow card) 37'; Llorente 67', 71'; Toquero 75'; Ekiza (yellow card) 80'	Summary	Godín (yellow card) 32'; Miranda (yellow card) 52'; Sílvio (yellow card) 66'; Assunção (yellow card) 81'; Salvio (yellow card) 85'	Stadium: San Mamés; Attendance: 30,000; Referee: Fernando Teixeira Vitienes

30 October 2011 11	Sporting Gijón	1 – 1	Athletic Bilbao	Gijón
11:00 CET	Trejo (yellow card) 27'; Bilić 71'	Summary	Iraola (yellow card) 12'; Susaeta (yellow card) 24', (goal) 63'; Iturraspe (yellow card) 90'	Stadium: El Molinón; Attendance: 21,000; Referee: José Luis González González

6 November 2011 12	Athletic Bilbao	2 – 2	Barcelona	Bilbao
19:00 CET	Herrera 20', (yellow card) 22'; J. Martínez (yellow card) 48'; Iturraspe (yellow card) 54'; Amorebieta (yellow card) 69' (yellow-red card) 90'; Piqué 80' (o.g.)	Summary	Fàbregas 24'; Piqué (yellow card) 63'; Messi 90+1'	Stadium: San Mamés; Attendance: 40,000; Referee: José Luis Paradas Romero

20 November 2011 13	Sevilla	1 – 2	Athletic Bilbao	Seville
17:00 CET	Navas 15'; Navarro (yellow card) 27'; Spahić (yellow card) 90'	Summary	Iraola 6'; De Marcos (yellow card) 43', (goal) 71'; San José (yellow card) 48'	Stadium: Ramón Sánchez Pizjuán; Attendance: 28,000; Referee: Miguel Ángel Ayza Gámez

27 November 2011 14	Athletic Bilbao	0 – 1	Granada	Bilbao
18:45 CET	Muniain (yellow card) 45'; Aurtenetxe (yellow card) 45'	Summary	López 32'; Nyom (yellow card) 33'; Yebda (yellow card) 41'; Siqueira (yellow card) 44'; Roberto (yellow card) 87'	Stadium: San Mamés; Attendance: 30,000; Referee: Alberto Undiano Mallenco

4 December 2011 15	Mallorca	1 – 1	Athletic Bilbao	Palma
20:00 CET	Álvaro 3'; Pina (yellow card) 30'; Tissone (yellow card) 45+2'; Ramis (yellow card) 56'; Martí (yellow card) 68'; Cáceres (yellow card) 71'; Chico (yellow card) 79'; Hemed (yellow card) 83'	Summary	Amorebieta (yellow card) 41', (goal) 45+3'; Iturraspe (yellow card) 51'; Pérez (yellow card) 72'; Toquero (yellow card) 86'; Raúl (yellow card) 90+2'	Stadium: Iberostar; Attendance: 13,000; Referee: César Muñiz Fernández

11 December 2011 16	Athletic Bilbao	1 – 1	Racing Santander	Bilbao
19:45 CET	Iturraspe (yellow card) 65'; Aurtenetxe 80'; Iraola (yellow card) 88'	Summary	Arana (yellow card) 8'; Serrano (yellow card) 62'; Munitis (yellow card) 68'; Cisma (yellow card) 84'; Á. González 90+2'	Stadium: San Mamés; Attendance: 30,000; Referee: Carlos del Cerro Grande

17 December 2011 17	Athletic Bilbao	2 – 1	Zaragoza	Bilbao
20:00 CET	Susaeta 7'; J. Martínez (red card) 21'; Herrera (yellow card) 78'; Toquero 87'	Summary	Ponzio 22' (pen.), (yellow card) 31'; Lanzaro (yellow card) 24' (yellow-red card) 69'; Tomás (yellow card) 37'; Postiga (yellow card) 60'; Juárez (yellow card) 90+1'	Stadium: San Mamés; Attendance: 25,000; Referee: Pedro Jesús Pérez Montero

8 January 2012 18	Getafe	0 – 0	Athletic Bilbao	Madrid
16:00 CET	Güiza (yellow card) 28'; Rafa (yellow card) 55'; Míchel (yellow card) 58'	Summary	Aurtenetxe (yellow card) 69'	Stadium: Coliseum Alfonso Pérez; Attendance: 10,000; Referee: Alfonso Alvarez Izquierdo

15 January 2012 19	Athletic Bilbao	3 – 0	Levante	Bilbao
18:00 CET	Amerebieta 11'; Llorente 40'; Aurtenetxe (yellow card) 46'; Herrera (yellow card) 64'; San José 90'	Summary	Torres (yellow card) 21'; Juanfran (yellow card) 61' (yellow-red card) 89'; Del Horno (yellow card) 68'; Farinós (yellow card) 75'; Ballesteros (yellow card) 90+3'	Stadium: San Mamés; Attendance: 33,000; Referee: Carlos Velasco Carballo

22 January 2012 1	Real Madrid	4 – 1	Athletic Bilbao	Madrid
21:30 CET	Marcelo 25'; Ronaldo (yellow card) 29', (goal) 46' (pen.), 67' (pen.); Ramos (yellow card) 57'; Arbeloa (yellow card) 74'; Callejón 86'	Summary	Llorente 13'; De Marcos (yellow card) 26', (red card) 66'; Iturraspe (yellow card) 46'	Stadium: Santiago Bernabéu; Attendance: 75,000; Referee: Antonio Miguel Mateu Lahoz

28 January 2012 21	Rayo Vallecano	2 – 3	Athletic Bilbao	Madrid
18:00 CET	Michu 11'; Casado (yellow card) 18'; Arribas 27'; Rayco (yellow card) 82'	Summary	Pérez (yellow card) 9'; Llorente 17', 23', 68'; Susaeta (yellow card) 25'; Toquero (yellow card) 41'; Ekiza (yellow card) 85'	Stadium: Vallecas; Attendance: 12,450; Referee: José Luis Paradas Romero

4 February 2012 22	Athletic Bilbao	3 – 3	Espanyol	Bilbao
18:00 CET	De Marcos 26'; Muniain (yellow card) 28'; López (yellow card) 44'; Llorente 58'; J. Martínez 65' (yellow card) 90'; Iturraspe (yellow card) 85'	Summary	Romaric 33'; Weiss 48', (yellow card) 58'; Forlín (yellow card) 70'; Albín 90', (yellow card) 90+1'	Stadium: San Mamés; Attendance: 30,000; Referee: David Fernández Borbalán

11 February 2012 23	Real Betis	2 – 1	Athletic Bilbao	Seville
22:00 CET	Castro 9'; Iriney (yellow card) 47'; Molina (yellow card) 49'; Beñat (yellow card) 60'; Nélson 90+1', (yellow card) 72'	Summary	J. Martínez 23', (yellow card) 29' (yellow-red card) 64'; Aurtenetxe (yellow card) 49'	Stadium: Benito Villamarín; Attendance: 30,000; Referee: José Antonio Teixeira Vitienes

19 February 2012 24	Athletic Bilbao	3 – 0	Málaga	Bilbao
16:00 CET	Iraola (yellow card) 15'; Herrera (yellow card) 21'; Amorebieta 57'; San José 60'; Toquero 61'; Muniain (yellow card) 65'; De Marcos (yellow card) 86'	Summary	Weligton (yellow card) 83'	Stadium: San Mamés; Attendance: 34,000; Referee: Carlos Clos Gómez

26 February 2012 25	Villarreal	2 – 2	Athletic Bilbao	Villarreal
12:00 CET	Senna 11', (yellow card) 18'; Nilmar 68'	Summary	Aurtenetxe (yellow card) 50'; Llorente 62'; Pérez (yellow card) 64'; Toquero (yellow card) 66'; Susaeta 66'; Iturraspe (yellow card) 75'	Stadium: El Madrigal; Attendance: 16,000; Referee: Ignacio Iglesias Villanueva

4 March 2012 26	Athletic Bilbao	2 – 0	Real Sociedad	Bilbao
16:00 CET	J. Martínez (yellow card) 22'; Susaeta 25', 81', (yellow card) 73'; Amorebieta (yellow card) 62'; San José (yellow card) 66'	Summary	Zurutuza (yellow card) 34'; Bergara (yellow card) 38'; Vela (yellow card) 73'; Cadamuro-Bentaïba (yellow card) 77'; González (yellow card) 80'; Estrada (yellow card) 84'	Stadium: San Mamés; Referee: Antonio Mateu Lahoz

11 March 2012 27	Osasuna	2 – 1	Athletic Bilbao	Pamplona
21:30 CET				Stadium: El Sadar; Referee: Alfonso Javier Álvarez Izquierdo

18 March 2012 28	Athletic Bilbao	0 – 3	Valencia	Bilbao
18:00 CET	Iraola (yellow card) 36' (yellow-red card) 66'; Iturraspe (yellow card) 66'; De Marcos (yellow card) 76'; San José (yellow card) 84'	Summary	Barragán (yellow card) 28'; Soldado 42', 57', 85' (pen.), (yellow card) 82'; Alba (yellow card) 44'; Topal (yellow card) 50'; Rami (yellow card) 75'; Parejo (yellow card) 80'	Stadium: San Mamés; Attendance: 35,000; Referee: José Antonio Teixeira Vitienes

21 March 2012 29	Atlético Madrid	2 – 1	Athletic Bilbao	Madrid
20:00 CET	Gabi (yellow card) 38'; Falcao 50', 72'; Juanfran (yellow card) 64'; Miranda (yellow card) 66'; Suárez (yellow card) 82'	Summary	Herrera (yellow card) 40'; San José (yellow card) 63'; J. Martínez (yellow card) 70', (goal) 90+2'	Stadium: Vicente Calderón; Attendance: 30,000; Referee: Javier Estrada Fernández

25 March 2012 30	Athletic Bilbao	1 – 1	Sporting Gijón	Bilbao
18:00 CET	De Marcos 77', (yellow card) 85'; Aurtenetxe (yellow card) 90+4'	Summary	Eguren (yellow card) 17'; Castro (yellow card) 34'; Botía (yellow card) 35'; Hernández (yellow card) 62'; Lora 90'	Stadium: San Mamés; Attendance: 35,000; Referee: Ignacio Iglesias

31 March 2012 31	Barcelona	2 – 0	Athletic Bilbao	Barcelona
22:00 CET	Iniesta 40'; Messi 58' (pen.); Busquets (yellow card) 66'	Summary	Toquero (yellow card) 52'; Iturraspe (yellow card) 56'; J. Martínez (yellow card) 57'	Stadium: Camp Nou; Attendance: 88,027; Referee: Antonio Miguel Mateu Lahoz

8 April 2012 32	Athletic Bilbao	1 – 0	Sevilla	Bilbao
18:00 CET	Llorente 47'; Iraola (yellow card) 48'; Amorebieta (yellow card) 81'; Muniain (yellow card) 88'; Aurtenetxe (yellow card) 89'	Summary	Kanouté (yellow card) 15'; Medel (yellow card) 40'; Escudé (yellow card) 41'; Navas (yellow card) 84'	Stadium: San Mamés; Attendance: 35,000; Referee: Alfonso Alvarez Izquierdo

11 April 2012 33	Granada	2 – 2	Athletic Bilbao	Granada
20:00 CET	Romero 2', (red card) 39'; Nyom (yellow card) 63'; Geijo 74'; Gómez (yellow card) 87'	Summary	Iturraspe (yellow card) 48'; Amorebieta (yellow card) 60'; Llorente 81'; Susaeta 87'; De Marcos (yellow card) 90+2'	Stadium: Los Cármenes; Attendance: 22,500; Referee: Alberto Undiano Mallenco

15 April 2012 34	Athletic Bilbao	1 – 0	Mallorca	Bilbao
18:00 CET	Llorente 13'; Herrera (yellow card) 50'	Summary	Cáceres (yellow card) 53'; Cendrós (yellow card) 76'; Pina (yellow card) 86'; Tejera (yellow card) 88'	Stadium: San Mamés; Attendance: 25,000; Referee: Javier Estrada Fernández

22 April 2012 35	Racing Santander	0 – 1	Athletic Bilbao	Santander
16:00 CET	Álvaro (yellow card) 55'; Martínez (yellow card) 90'	Summary	Toquero 12'; Aurtenetxe (yellow card) 61'; Amorebieta (yellow card) 68'	Stadium: El Sardinero; Attendance: 15,000; Referee: Pedro Jesús Pérez Montero

29 April 2012 36	Zaragoza	2 – 0	Athletic Bilbao	Zaragoza
16:00 CET				Stadium: La Romareda

2 May 2012 20	Athletic Bilbao	0 – 3	Real Madrid	Bilbao
22:00 CEST (UTC+02)	J. Martínez (yellow card) 11' (yellow-red card) 72'; San José (yellow card) 37'; Toquero (yellow card) 45+1'; Pérez (yellow card) 85'		Ramos (yellow card) 12'; Higuaín 16'; Özil 20', (yellow card) 78'; Coentrão (yellow card) 36'; Ronaldo 50'; Arbeloa (yellow card) 64'; Alonso (yellow card) 69'	Stadium: San Mamés; Attendance: 37,500; Referee: José Antonio Teixeira Vitienes

5 May 2012 37	Athletic Bilbao	0 – 0	Getafe	Bilbao
--:-- CEST (UTC+02)				Stadium: San Mamés

13 May 2012 38	Levante	3 – 0	Athletic Bilbao	Valencia
20:00 CEST (UTC+02)	Ghezzal (yellow card) 45', (goal) 45', 67'; Farinós 88' (pen.)	Report		Stadium: Ciutat de València; Attendance: 12,000; Referee: Carlos Clos Gómez

== Copa del Rey ==
=== Round of 32 ===
8 December 2011 First leg	Real Oviedo	0 – 1	Athletic Bilbao	Oviedo
22:00 CET	Diop (yellow card) 40'; Nano (yellow card) 80'	Summary	De Marcos 11'; Pérez (yellow card) 85'	Stadium: Carlos Tartiere; Attendance: 15,000; Referee: José Luis González González

21 December 2011 Second leg	Athletic Bilbao	1–0 (2–0 agg.)	Real Oviedo	Bilbao
22:00 CET	Amorebieta (yellow card) 56'; San José (yellow card) 64'; Herrera 74'	Summary	Juanma Marrero (yellow card) 36'	Stadium: San Mamés; Attendance: 18,000; Referee: José Antonio Teixeira Vitienes

=== Round of 16 ===
3 January 2012 First leg	Albacete	0 – 0	Athletic Bilbao	Albacete
20:00 CET	Castillo (yellow card) 18'; Rocha (yellow card) 38'; Candela (yellow card) 56'	Summary	Iturraspe (yellow card) 45'	Stadium: Carlos Belmonte; Attendance: 13,000; Referee: Antonio Miguel Mateu Lahoz

12 January 2012 Second leg	Athletic Bilbao	4 – 0 (4 – 0 agg.)	Albacete	Bilbao
20:00 CET	Susaeta 24'; Iturraspe (yellow card) 42'; Muniain (yellow card) 53'; Herrera 65'; Toquero 77'; San José 86'	Summary	Castillo (yellow card) 49'; Rocha (yellow card) 60'; Candela (yellow card) 72'	Stadium: San Mamés; Attendance: 18,000; Referee: Xavier Estrada Fernández

=== Quarter-finals ===
18 January 2012 First leg	Athletic Bilbao	2 – 0	Mallorca	Bilbao
20:00 CET	Llorente (yellow card) 10', (goal) 35'; Muniain 59', (yellow card) 77'	Summary	Cendrós (yellow card) 45'; Tissone (yellow card) 48'; Nunes (yellow card) 55'; Pereira (yellow card) 58'; João Victor (yellow card) 86'	Stadium: San Mamés; Attendance: 38,000; Referee: José Luis González González

25 January 2012 Second leg	Mallorca	0 – 1 (0 – 3 agg.)	Athletic Bilbao	Palma
20:00 CET	Ramis (yellow card) 90'; Chico (red card) 90'	Summary	Amorebieta (yellow card) 41'; Herrera (yellow card) 62'; Toquero (yellow card) 67'; Ramis 76' (o.g.); Iraizoz (yellow card) 82'	Stadium: Iberostar; Attendance: 10,990; Referee: Carlos del Cerro Grande

=== Semi-finals ===
31 January 2012 First leg	Mirandés	1 – 2	Athletic Bilbao	Miranda de Ebro
22:00 CET	García (yellow card) 45'; Corral (yellow card) 67'; Mújika (yellow card) 85'; Lambarri 90+1'	Summary	Llorente 18', 27'; Iturraspe (yellow card) 56'; J. Martínez (yellow card) 61'; López (yellow card) 77'; Pérez (yellow card) 88'	Stadium: Anduva; Attendance: 7,980; Referee: Xavier Estrada Fernández

7 February 2012 Second leg	Athletic Bilbao	6 – 2 (8 – 3 agg.)	Mirandés	Bilbao
22:00 CET	Muniain 11'; Susaeta 14'; Aurtenetxe 22'; Amorebieta (yellow card) 60'; Llorente 71', 75'; Caneda 88' (o.g.)	Summary	Iribas (yellow card) 20'; Blanco 57', 86'	Stadium: San Mamés; Attendance: 39,000; Referee: Alberto Undiano Mallenco

=== Final ===
25 May 2012 Final	Athletic Bilbao	0 – 3	Barcelona	Madrid
21:30 CEST	Susaeta (yellow card) 40'; Iraola (yellow card) 43'	Report	Pedro 3', 25'; Messi 20'; Xavi (yellow card) 66'; Iniesta (yellow card) 71'	Stadium: Vicente Calderón; Attendance: 54,850; Referee: David Fernández Borbalán

== UEFA Europa League ==
=== Play-off round ===
18 August 2011 First Leg	Athletic Bilbao (Spain)	0 – 0	(Turkey) Trabzonspor	Bilbao, Spain
21:00 CET		Report		Stadium: San Mamés Stadium; Attendance: 26,000; Referee: Daniele Orsato (Italy)

25 August 2011 Second Leg	Trabzonspor (Turkey)	Cancelled	(Spain) Athletic Bilbao	Istanbul, Turkey
20:30 CET		Report		Stadium: Türk Telekom Arena; Referee: Knut Kircher (Germany)
Note: As a result of match-fixing allegations, Turkish club Fenerbahçe were removed from the 2011–12 UEFA Champions League and were replaced with Trabzonspor on 24 August 2011. As a result, Trabzonspor's second leg against Athletic Bilbao was cancelled, and Athletic Bilbao qualified for the group stage.

=== Group stage ===
Pos	Team	Pld	W	D	L	GF	GA	GD	Pts	Qualification
1	(Spain) Athletic Bilbao	6	4	1	1	11	8	+3	13	Advance to knockout phase
2	(Austria) Red Bull Salzburg	6	3	1	2	11	8	+3	10 (Note: Tied on head-to-head points (3) and head-to-head goal difference (0). Head-to-head away goals: Red Bull Salzburg 1, Paris Saint-Germain 0.)	Advance to knockout phase
3	(France) Paris Saint-Germain	6	3	1	2	8	7	+1	10	
4	(Slovakia) Slovan Bratislava	6	0	1	5	4	11	−7	1	

Source: Soccerway
Notes:

15 September 2011 1	Slovan Bratislava (Slovakia)	1 – 2	(Spain) Athletic Bilbao	Bratislava, Slovakia
19:00 CET	Guédé 34'	Report	Susaeta 13'; Muniain 40'	Stadium: Štadión Pasienky; Attendance: 6,328; Referee: Alon Yefet (Israel)

29 September 2011 2	Athletic Bilbao (Spain)	2 – 0	(France) Paris Saint-Germain	Bilbao, Spain
21:05 CET	Gabilondo 20'; Susaeta 45+1'	Report		Stadium: San Mamés Stadium; Attendance: 23,487; Referee: Bas Nijhuis (Netherlands)

20 October 2011 3	Athletic Bilbao (Spain)	2 – 2	(Austria) Red Bull Salzburg	Bilbao, Spain
21:05 CET	Llorente 69' (pen.), 75' (pen.)	Report	Wallner 30'; Leonardo 36'	Stadium: San Mamés Stadium; Attendance: 22,566; Referee: Ivan Bebek (Croatia)

3 November 2011 4	Red Bull Salzburg (Austria)	0 – 1	(Spain) Athletic Bilbao	Wals-Siezenheim, Austria
19:00 CET		Report	Herrera 37'	Stadium: Red Bull Arena; Attendance: 10,350; Referee: Stanislav Todorov (Bulgaria)

1 December 2011 5	Athletic Bilbao (Spain)	2 – 1	(Slovakia) Slovan Bratislava	Bilbao, Spain
21:05 CET	De Marcos 15'; Susaeta 75'	Report	Šebo 39'	Stadium: San Mamés Stadium; Attendance: 28,314; Referee: Hannes Kaasik (Estonia)

14 December 2011 6	Paris Saint-Germain (France)	4 – 2	(Spain) Athletic Bilbao	Paris, France
19:00 CET	Pastore 21'; Bodmer 41'; Pérez 85' (o.g.); Hoarau 90' (pen.)	Report	Aurtenetxe 3'; López 55'	Stadium: Parc des Princes; Attendance: 37,114; Referee: Matej Jug (Slovenia)

=== Knockout phase ===
==== Round of 32 ====
16 February 2012 First leg	Lokomotiv Moscow (Russia)	2 – 1	(Spain) Athletic Bilbao	Moscow, Russia
21:00 MSK	Glushakov 61' (pen.); Caicedo 71'	Report	Muniain 36'	Stadium: Luzhniki Stadium; Attendance: 13,160; Referee: Ovidiu Alin Hațegan (Romania)

23 February 2012 Second leg	Athletic Bilbao (Spain)	1 – 0 (a 2 – 2 agg.)	(Russia) Lokomotiv Moscow	Bilbao, Spain
19:00 CET	Muniain 62'	Report		Stadium: San Mamés Stadium; Attendance: 35,000; Referee: Pawel Gil (Poland)

==== Round of 16 ====
8 March 2012 First leg	Manchester United (England)	2 – 3	(Spain) Athletic Bilbao	Manchester, England
20:05 WET	Rooney 22', 90+2' (pen.)	Report	Llorente 44'; De Marcos 72'; Muniain 90'	Stadium: Old Trafford; Attendance: 67,000; Referee: Florian Meyer (Germany)

15 March 2012 Second leg	Athletic Bilbao (Spain)	2 – 1 (5 – 3 agg.)	(England) Manchester United	Bilbao, Spain
19:00 CET	Llorente 23'; De Marcos 65'	Report	Rooney 80'	Stadium: San Mamés Stadium; Attendance: 40,000; Referee: Cüneyt Çakır (Turkey)

==== Quarter-finals ====
29 March 2012 First leg	Schalke 04 (Germany)	2 – 4	(Spain) Athletic Bilbao	Gelsenkirchen, Germany
21:05	Raúl 22', 60'	Report	Llorente 20', 73'; De Marcos 81'; Muniain 90+3'	Stadium: Veltins-Arena; Attendance: 52,000; Referee: Pedro Proença (Portugal)

5 April 2012 Second leg	Athletic Bilbao (Spain)	2 – 2 (6 – 4 agg.)	(Germany) Schalke 04	Bilbao, Spain
21:05	Ibai 41'; Susaeta 55'	Report	Huntelaar 29'; Raúl 52'	Stadium: San Mamés Stadium; Attendance: 40,000; Referee: Nicola Rizzoli (Italy)

==== Semi-finals ====
19 April 2012 First leg	Sporting CP (Portugal)	2 – 1	(Spain) Athletic Bilbao	Lisbon, Portugal
21:05	Izmailov (yellow card) 61'; Pereira (yellow card) 67'; Insúa 76'; Capel 80'	Report	De Marcos (yellow card) 11'; Iturraspe (yellow card) 29'; Aurtenetxe 54'; Llorente (yellow card) 86'	Stadium: Estádio José Alvalade; Attendance: 37,700; Referee: Jonas Eriksson (Sweden)

26 April 2012 Second leg	Athletic Bilbao (Spain)	3 – 1 (4 – 3 agg.)	(Portugal) Sporting CP	Bilbao, Spain
21:05	Susaeta 17'; Ibai 45+1', (yellow card) 76'; Amorebieta (yellow card) 54'; Llorente 88'	Report	Van Wolfswinkel (yellow card) 10', (goal) 44'; Carriço (yellow card) 59'; Xandão (yellow card) 90+4'	Stadium: San Mamés Stadium; Attendance: 40,000; Referee: Martin Atkinson (England)

==== Final ====
9 May 2012 Final	Atlético Madrid (Spain)	3 – 0	(Spain) Athletic Bilbao	Bucharest, Romania
21:45 EEST	Falcao 7', 34', (yellow card) 26'; Diego 85'	Report	Herrera (yellow card) 22'; Amorebieta (yellow card) 64'; Pérez (yellow card) 75'; Susaeta (yellow card) 90+1'	Stadium: Arena Națională; Attendance: 52,347; Referee: Wolfgang Stark (Germany)

== See also ==
- Athletic Bilbao in European football
