= Iñigo Ruiz de Galarreta =

Spanish footballer (born 1993)

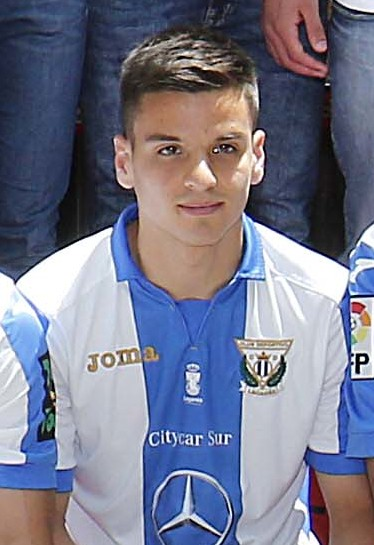
- Ruiz de Galarreta with Leganés in 2016

Personal information
- Full name: Iñigo Ruiz de Galarreta Etxeberria
- Date of birth: 6 August 1993 (age 33)
- Place of birth: Eibar, Spain
- Height: 1.75 m (5 ft 9 in)
- Position: Central midfielder

Team information
- Current team: Athletic Bilbao
- Number: 16

Youth career
- 2003–2011: Athletic Bilbao

Senior career*
Years	Team	Apps	(Gls)
2011	Basconia	1	(0)
2011–2013	Bilbao Athletic	28	(0)
2011–2016	Athletic Bilbao	3	(0)
2013–2014	→ Mirandés (loan)	11	(1)
2014–2015	→ Zaragoza (loan)	37	(1)
2015–2016	→ Leganés (loan)	20	(1)
2016–2017	Numancia	37	(2)
2017–2018	Barcelona B	27	(1)
2018–2019	Las Palmas	35	(2)
2019–2023	Mallorca	81	(0)
2019–2020	→ Las Palmas (loan)	33	(0)
2023–	Athletic Bilbao	97	(2)

International career^{‡}
2009	Spain U16	2	(0)
2009	Spain U17	4	(0)
2011	Spain U18	2	(0)
2012	Spain U19	2	(0)
2025–	Basque Country	1	(0)
- * Club domestic league appearances and goals as of 16:02, 25 October 2026 (UTC) ‡ National team caps and goals as of 20:22, 17 November 2025 (UTC)

Iñigo Ruiz de Galarreta Etxeberria (born 6 August 1993) is a Spanish professional footballer who plays as a central midfielder for La Liga club Athletic Bilbao.

== Club career ==
Born in Eibar, Gipuzkoa, Ruiz de Galarreta joined Athletic Bilbao's youth system in 2003, aged 10. On 14 December 2011, while still considered a youth squad player, he made his debut with the first team, coming on as a substitute for Borja Ekiza in the 88th minute of a 4–2 away loss against Paris Saint-Germain FC in that season's UEFA Europa League; during his first year, however, he almost exclusively played with the reserves in the Segunda División B.

Ruiz de Galarreta made his second appearance for the main squad on 2 August 2012, again in the Europa League but now against NK Slaven Belupo (27 minutes played, 3–1 home win). He played his first La Liga game 17 days later, replacing Gaizka Toquero at half-time of an eventual 3–5 home defeat to Real Betis.

During a match with the B side against Lleida Esportiu on 21 October 2012, Ruiz de Galarreta ruptured the anterior cruciate ligament on his left knee, being sidelined for the remainder of the campaign. For 2013–14 he was loaned to CD Mirandés of Segunda División, where in a home game against CD Numancia on 27 October he suffered the same injury. Previously, on 8 September, he scored his first goal as a senior, the only in the away victory over Real Madrid Castilla.

The following years, Ruiz de Galarreta played with Real Zaragoza and CD Leganés on loan, helping the latter club to achieve a first-ever promotion to the top flight in 2016. He continued to compete in the second division subsequently, representing Numancia, FC Barcelona Atlètic and UD Las Palmas.

On 2 September 2019, Ruiz de Galarreta signed a four-year contract with RCD Mallorca in the top tier, though it was agreed he would remain on loan at Las Palmas for the upcoming season. He achieved another promotion with the former in 2020–21, contributing 29 appearances to this feat.

Ruiz de Galarreta returned to his first club Athletic on 7 June 2023, on a two-year deal. He scored his first goal for them on 5 November, opening a 3–2 away victory over Villarreal CF.

In May 2025, Ruiz de Galarreta extended his contract until 2027.

== International career ==
Ruiz de Galarreta started representing Spain at under-17 level, appearing in 2010 UEFA European Championship qualifiers against Faroe Islands and Romania and two friendlies with Portugal. He also played for the under-18s and the under-19s.

Ruiz de Galarreta was called up to the Basque Country national team for a friendly against Palestine on 15 November 2025. He featured the second half of the 3–0 win at the San Mamés Stadium.

== Career statistics ==
As of match played 25 October 2026

Appearances and goals by club, season and competition
Club	Season	League			Copa del Rey		Continental		Other		Total	
Club	Season	Division	Apps	Goals	Apps	Goals	Apps	Goals	Apps	Goals	Apps	Goals
Bilbao Athletic	2011–12	Segunda División B	25	0	—		—		—		25	0
Bilbao Athletic	2012–13	Segunda División B	3	0	—		—		—		3	0
Bilbao Athletic	Total		28	0	0	0	0	0	0	0	28	0
Athletic Bilbao	2011–12	La Liga	0	0	0	0	1 (Note: Appearances in UEFA Europa League)	0	—		1	0
Athletic Bilbao	2012–13	La Liga	3	0	0	0	5	0	—		8	0
Athletic Bilbao	2013–14	La Liga	0	0	0	0	—		—		0	0
Athletic Bilbao	2014–15	La Liga	0	0	0	0	—		—		0	0
Athletic Bilbao	2015–16	La Liga	0	0	0	0	—		—		0	0
Athletic Bilbao	Total		3	0	0	0	6	0	0	0	9	0
Mirandés (loan)	2013–14	Segunda División	11	1	0	0	—		—		11	1
Zaragoza (loan)	2014–15	Segunda División	37	1	1	0	—		3 (Note: Appearances in La Liga play-offs)	0	41	1
Leganés (loan)	2015–16	Segunda División	20	1	2	1	—		—		22	2
Numancia	2016–17	Segunda División	37	2	1	0	—		—		38	2
Barcelona B	2017–18	Segunda División	27	1	—		—		—		27	1
Las Palmas	2018–19	Segunda División	35	2	0	0	—		—		35	2
Las Palmas (loan)	2019–20	Segunda División	33	0	0	0	—		—		33	0
Mallorca	2020–21	Segunda División	29	0	1	0	—		—		30	0
Mallorca	2021–22	La Liga	22	0	4	0	—		—		26	0
Mallorca	2022–23	La Liga	30	0	2	0	—		—		32	0
Mallorca	Total		81	0	7	0	0	0	0	0	88	0
Athletic Bilbao	2023–24	La Liga	29	1	6	0	—		—		35	1
Athletic Bilbao	2024–25	La Liga	26	0	1	0	13	0	0	0	40	0
Athletic Bilbao	2025–26	La Liga	34	1	4	0	7 (Note: Appearances in UEFA Champions League)	0	1 (Note: Appearance in Supercopa de España)	0	46	1
Athletic Bilbao	2026–27	La Liga	8	0	0	0	—		—		8	0
Athletic Bilbao	Total		97	2	11	0	20	0	1	0	129	2
Career total			409	10	22	1	26	0	4	0	461	11

== Honours ==
Athletic Bilbao

- Copa del Rey: 2023–24
