= 2012–13 Athletic Bilbao season =

Athletic Bilbao
2012–13 season
- President: Josu Urrutia
- Head coach: Marcelo Bielsa
- Stadium: San Mamés
- La Liga: 12th
- Copa del Rey: Round of 32
- UEFA Europa League: Group stage (3rd)
- Top goalscorer: League: Aritz Aduriz (14); All: Aritz Aduriz (18)
Home colours	Away colours	Third colours

The 2012–13 Athletic Bilbao season was the 82nd consecutive season in the top flight and 112th season overall. Athletic were looking to continue their ascendency from last season where they made the final in two different competitions.

Athletic Bilbao competed for their ninth La Liga title and also participated in the UEFA Europa League, entering in the third qualifying round due to their defeat to Barcelona in the 2012 Copa del Rey Final, who had already qualified for European competition. They also entered the Copa del Rey in the Round of 32.

== Squad ==
The numbers and stats are established according to the official website: www.athletic-club.net

As of 1 June 2013

No.	Pos.	Nat.	Name	League		Cup		Europe		Total		Discipline		
No.	Pos.	Nat.	Name	Apps	Goals	Apps	Goals	Apps	Goals	Apps	Goals	Yellow card	Yellow-red card	Red card
1	GK	(Spain)	Gorka Iraizoz	35	0	0	0	7	0	42	0	4		
2	FW	(Spain)	Gaizka Toquero	1 (15)	0	1	0	5	2	7 (15)	2	1		
3	DF	(Spain)	Jon Aurtenetxe	24 (3)	1	2	0	2	0	28 (3)	1	3		
4	DF	(France)	Aymeric Laporte	14 (1)	0	0	0	2	0	16 (1)	0	6	1	1
5	DF	(Venezuela)	Fernando Amorebieta	10 (1)	0	2	0	4	0	16 (1)	0	7	1	
6	DF	(Spain)	Mikel San José	23 (11)	5	2	0	4	1	29 (11)	6	9		
8	MF	(Spain)	Ander Iturraspe	27 (3)	0	1 (1)	0	9	0	37 (4)	0	15	1	
9	FW	(Spain)	Fernando Llorente	4 (22)	4	2	0	2 (6)	1	8 (28)	5	2		
10	MF	(Spain)	Óscar de Marcos	36	6	1 (1)	0	8	1	45 (1)	7	15		
11	FW	(Spain)	Ibai Gómez	17 (18)	4	2	0	4 (5)	1	23 (23)	5	2		
13	GK	(Spain)	Raúl Fernández	3	0	2	0	3	0	8	0			
14	MF	(Spain)	Markel Susaeta	36	7	1 (1)	0	8	4	44 (1)	12	10	1	
15	DF	(Spain)	Andoni Iraola	34 (1)	0	1	0	7	1	42 (1)	1	5		
16	FW	(Spain)	Isma López	6 (2)	0	—	—	6 (2)	2	12 (4)	2			
17	MF	(Spain)	Iñigo Pérez	5	0	—	—	3 (1)	1	8 (1)	1	3		
18	MF	(Spain)	Carlos Gurpegi (c)	24 (3)	1	—	—	7	0	31 (3)	1	14		
19	FW	(Spain)	Iker Muniain	27 (6)	1	1 (1)	0	6 (2)	1	34 (9)	2	11		1
20	FW	(Spain)	Aritz Aduriz	33 (3)	14	0 (2)	1	5 (1)	3	38 (6)	18	12	1	
21	MF	(Spain)	Ander Herrera	29	1	2	0	3 (1)	1	34 (1)	2	12	1	1
22	DF	(Spain)	Xabi Castillo	3 (4)	0	0	0	5	0	8 (4)	0	1		
23	DF	(Spain)	Borja Ekiza	23 (1)	0	1	0	2 (1)	0	26 (2)	0	3		
26	MF	(Spain)	Igor Martínez	0 (3)	0	—	—	2 (1)	1	2 (4)	1	1		
27	MF	(Spain)	Iñigo Ruiz de Galarreta	0 (3)	0	—	—	1 (4)	0	1 (7)	0			
28	DF	(Spain)	Jonás Ramalho	4 (2)	0	1	0	3 (1)	0	8 (3)	0			
33	MF	(Spain)	Iker Undabarrena	—	—	—	—	0 (1)	0	0 (1)	0			
39	MF	(Spain)	Erik Morán	0 (1)	0	—	—	1 (1)	0	1 (2)	0			
40	MF	(Spain)	Álvaro Peña	—	—	—	—	1 (1)	0	1 (1)	0	1		
41	MF	(Spain)	Jonxa Vidal	—	—	—	—	0 (1)	0	0 (1)	0			

== Competitions ==
=== Friendlies ===
Kickoff times are in CET.

Win Draw Loss

Round	Date/Time	Opponents	Location	Score	Scorers	Referee
Friendly	13 July 2012 - 20:00	(France) Lyon	Stade des Alpes, Grenoble	2–1	Aduriz 78' (pen.), 88'	Wilfried Bien (France)
Friendly	17 July 2012 – 21:45	(Morocco) Raja Casablanca	Stade Mohamed V, Casablanca	1–3	Toquero 47'	Hicham Tiazi (Morocco)
Friendly	21 July 2012 – 14:00	(Netherlands) PSV Eindhoven	Stadion Miejski, Wrocław	0–1		Sebastian Tarnowski (Poland)
Friendly	22 July 2012 – 14:00	(Poland) Śląsk Wrocław	Stadion Miejski, Wrocław	1–0	Susaeta 43'	Marek Opalinski (Poland)
Friendly	27 July 2012 – 19:00	(France) Lille	Stade André Darrigade, Dax	1–3	Ibai 67'	Romain Delpech (France)
Friendly	11 August 2012 – 19:00	(Spain) Sestao River	Las Llanas, Sestao	1–2	Ibai 20'	Bikandi Garrido (Basque Country)
Friendly	15 August 2012 - 19:00	(Spain) Barakaldo	Nuevo Lasesarre, Barakaldo	2–1	Ibai 22', Aduriz 82'	González Esteban (Basque Country)
Friendly	21 August 2012 – 19:00	(Spain) Amorebieta	Urritxe, Amorebieta	1–3	Sabin 76'	Ricardo de Burgos Bengoetxea (Basque Country)
Friendly	7 September 2012 - 20:00	(Spain) Real Valladolid	Nuevo José Zorrilla, Valladolid	2–2 (3–1 pen.)	Ibai 35', Toquero 88'	González González (Castile and León)
Friendly	7 May 2013 – 19:00	(Spain) Portugalete	La Florida, Portugalete	3–1	Llorente 3', 76', Ibai 23'	González Esteban (Basque Country)
Friendly	22 May 2013 – 19:00	(Spain) Somorrostro	El Malecon, Muskiz	5–1	Ibai 11', 17', Sabin 15', Aurtenetxe 84', Unai López 87'	Delgado Ferreiro (Basque Country)
Friendly (Note: Centenary of Biscay Football Federation / Farewell to San Mamés)	5 June 2013 – 20:45	Biscay XI	San Mamés, Bilbao	0–1	Arroyo 66'	Delgado Ferreiro (Basque Country)

=== La Liga ===
==== League table ====
Pos	Team	Pld	W	D	L	GF	GA	GD	Pts
10	Getafe	38	13	8	17	43	57	−14	47
11	Levante	38	12	10	16	40	57	−17	46
12	Athletic Bilbao	38	12	9	17	44	65	−21	45
13	Espanyol	38	11	11	16	43	52	−9	44
14	Valladolid	38	11	10	17	49	58	−9	43

Source: La Liga
Rules for classification: 1st points; 2nd head-to-head points; 3rd head-to-head goal difference; 4th goal difference; 5th number of goals scored; 7th Fair-play points

==== Matches ====
Kickoff times are in CET.

Round	Date/Time	Opponents	Location	Score	Scorers	Referee
1	19 August 2012 – 19:00	Real Betis	San Mamés, Bilbao	3–5	De Marcos 47', San José 67', 76'	J. A. Teixeira Vitienes (Cantabria)
2	27 August 2012 – 22:00	Atlético Madrid	Vicente Calderón, Madrid	0–4		F. Teixeira Vitienes (Cantabria)
3	2 September 2012 – 16:00	Real Valladolid	San Mamés, Bilbao	2–0	Aduriz 69', Susaeta 75'	Del Cerro Grande (Community of Madrid)
4	16 September 2012 – 12:00	Espanyol	Cornellà-El Prat, Cornellà de Llobregat	3–3	Aduriz 56', 83', Llorente 71'	Pérez Montero (Andalusia)
5	23 September 2012 – 19:50	Málaga	San Mamés, Bilbao	0–0		Mateu Lahoz (Valencian Community)
6	29 September 2012 – 20:00	Real Sociedad	Anoeta, San Sebastián	0–2		Clos Gómez (Aragon)
7	7 October 2012 – 18:00	Osasuna	San Mamés, Bilbao	1–0	Aduriz 12'	González González (Castile and León)
8	21 October 2012 – 20:00	Valencia	Mestalla, Valencia	2–3	Aduriz 19', 30'	Undiano Mallenco (Navarre)
9	28 October 2012 – 17:50	Getafe	San Mamés, Bilbao	1–2	San José 90+3'	Gil Manzano (Canary Islands)
10	4 November 2012 – 19:45	Granada	Los Cármenes, Granada	2–1	Aduriz 13' (pen.), 27'	Muñiz Fernández (Asturias)
11	11 November 2012 – 16:00	Sevilla	San Mamés, Bilbao	2–1	De Marcos 26', Susaeta 45'	Hernández Hernández (Canary Islands)
12	17 November 2012 – 22:00	Real Madrid	Santiago Bernabéu, Madrid	1–5	Ibai 42'	J. A. Teixeira Vitienes (Cantabria)
13	25 November 2012 – 17:00	Deportivo La Coruña	San Mamés, Bilbao	1–1	De Marcos 24'	Álvarez Izquierdo (Catalonia)
14	2 December 2012 – 20:00	Barcelona	Camp Nou, Barcelona	1–5	Ibai 65'	Mateu Lahoz (Valencian Community)
15	9 December 2012 – 17:00	Celta Vigo	San Mamés, Bilbao	1–0	Aduriz 33'	F. Teixeira Vitienes (Cantabria)
16	16 December 2012 – 18:00	Mallorca	Iberostar, Palma	1–0	Aduriz 11'	Del Cerro Grande (Community of Madrid)
17	22 December 2012 – 22:00	Zaragoza	San Mamés, Bilbao	0–2		Mateu Lahoz (Valencian Community)
18	5 January 2013 – 16:00	Levante	Ciutat de València, Valencia	1–3	Aduriz 6'	Paradas Romero (Andalusia)
19	11 January 2013 – 21:30	Rayo Vallecano	San Mamés, Bilbao	1–2	San José 76'	Pérez Montero (Andalusia)
20	21 January 2013 – 21:30	Real Betis	Benito Villamarín, Sevilla	1–1	Aduriz 41'	Ayza Gámez (Valencian Community)
21	27 January 2013 – 21:00	Atlético Madrid	San Mamés, Bilbao	3–0	San José 50', Susaeta 77', De Marcos 84'	Muñiz Fernández (Asturias)
22	1 February 2013 – 21:30	Real Valladolid	Nuevo José Zorrilla, Valladolid	2–2	De Marcos 22', Susaeta 50'	Estrada Fernández (Catalonia)
23	10 February 2013 – 19:00	Espanyol	San Mamés, Bilbao	0–4		Velasco Carballo (Community of Madrid)
24	16 February 2013 – 18:00	Málaga	La Rosaleda, Málaga	0–1		González González (Castile and León)
25	22 February 2013 – 21:30	Real Sociedad	San Mamés, Bilbao	1–3	Ibai 30'	Undiano Mallenco (Navarre)
26	2 March 2013 – 20:00	Osasuna	El Sadar, Pamplona	1–0	Susaeta 63'	F. Teixeira Vitienes (Cantabria)
27	10 March 2013 – 12:00	Valencia	San Mamés, Bilbao	1–0	Muniain 79'	J. A. Teixeira Vitienes (Cantabria)
28	16 March 2013 – 18:00	Getafe	Alfonso Pérez, Getafe	0–1		Iglesias Villanueva (Galicia)
29	1 April 2013 – 20:00	Granada	San Mamés, Bilbao	1–0	Aduriz 66'	Del Cerro Grande (Community of Madrid)
30	8 April 2013 – 22:00	Sevilla	Ramón Sánchez Pizjuán, Sevilla	1–2	Gurpegi 55'	Mateu Lahoz (Valencian Community)
31	14 April 2013 – 21:00	Real Madrid	San Mamés, Bilbao	0–3		F. Teixeira Vitienes (Cantabria)
32	21 April 2013 – 17:00	Deportivo La Coruña	Riazor, A Coruña	1–1	Llorente 44'	Pérez Montero (Andalusia)
33	27 April 2013 – 18:00	Barcelona	San Mamés, Bilbao	2–2	Susaeta 26', Ander Herrera 90'	Iglesias Villanueva (Galicia)
34	3 May 2013 – 21:00	Celta Vigo	Balaídos, Vigo	1–1	De Marcos 43'	Velasco Carballo (Community of Madrid)
35	11 May 2013 – 16:00	Mallorca	San Mamés, Bilbao	2–1	Aduriz 7', Llorente 78'	Hernández Hernández (Canary Islands)
36	19 May 2013 – 19:00	Zaragoza	La Romareda, Zaragoza	2–1	Llorente 80', Ibai 92'	Del Cerro Grande (Community of Madrid)
37	26 May 2013 – 20:00	Levante	San Mamés, Bilbao	0–1		J. A. Teixeira Vitienes (Cantabria)
38	1 June 2013 – 21:00	Rayo Vallecano	Campo de Vallecas, Vallecas	2–2	Susaeta 30', Aurtenetxe 48'	Muñiz Fernández (Asturias)

=== Copa del Rey ===
Kickoff times are in CET.

Round	Date/Time	Opponents	Location	Score	Scorers	Referee
Round of 32 (1st leg)	1 November 2012 – 12:00	Eibar	Ipurua, Eibar	0–0		Paradas Romero (Andalusia)
Round of 32 (2nd leg)	12 December 2012 – 20:00	Eibar	San Mamés, Bilbao	1–1 (1–1a agg.)	Aduriz 88'	Velasco Carballo (Community of Madrid)

=== UEFA Europa League ===
Kickoff times are in CET.

==== Qualifying round ====
Round	Date/Time	Opponents	Location	Score	Scorers	Referee
Third qualifying round (1st leg)	2 August 2012 – 21:00	(Croatia) Slaven Belupo	San Mamés, Bilbao	3–1	Isma López 16', 68', Susaeta 20'	Serhiy Boiko (Ukraine)
Third qualifying round (2nd leg)	9 August 2012 – 18:45	(Croatia) Slaven Belupo	Gradski stadion, Koprivnica	1–2 (4–3 agg.)	Muniain 47'	Danny Makkelie (Netherlands)
Play-off round (1st Leg)	23 August 2012 – 21:00	(Finland) HJK Helsinki	San Mamés, Bilbao	6–0	Aduriz 25', 51', Susaeta 31', 57', Iñigo Pérez 42', Iraola 85'	Bülent Yıldırım (Turkey)
Play-off round (2nd Leg)	30 August 2012 – 19:00	(Finland) HJK Helsinki	Sonera Stadium, Helsinki	3–3 (9–3 agg.)	San José 67', Toquero 77', Igor Martínez 88'	Alan Kelly (Republic of Ireland)

==== Group stage ====
Pos	Team	Pld	W	D	L	GF	GA	GD	Pts	Qualification
1	(France) Lyon	6	5	1	0	14	8	+6	16	Advance to knockout phase
2	(Czech Republic) Sparta Prague	6	2	3	1	9	6	+3	9	Advance to knockout phase
3	(Spain) Athletic Bilbao	6	1	2	3	7	9	−2	5	
4	(Israel) Ironi Kiryat Shmona	6	0	2	4	6	13	−7	2	

Source: Soccerway

Kickoff times are in CET.

Round	Date/Time	Opponents	Location	Score	Scorers	Referee
Matchday 1	20 September 2012 – 21:05	(Israel) Ironi Kiryat Shmona	San Mamés, Bilbao	1–1	Susaeta 40'	Simon Lee Evans (Wales)
Matchday 2	4 October 2012 – 19:00	(Czech Republic) Sparta Prague	Generali Arena, Prague	1–3	De Marcos 73'	Manuel De Sousa (Portugal)
Matchday 3	25 October 2012 – 19:00	(France) Lyon	Stade de Gerland, Lyon	1–2	Ibai 79'	Andre Marriner (England)
Matchday 4	8 November 2012 – 21:05	(France) Lyon	San Mamés, Bilbao	2–3	Ander Herrera 48', Aduriz 55' (pen.)	Pol van Boekel (Netherlands)
Matchday 5	29 November 2012 – 19:00	(Israel) Ironi Kiryat Shmona	Kiryat Eliezer Stadium, Haifa	2–0	Llorente 34', Toquero 76'	Rene Eisner (Austria)
Matchday 6	6 December 2012 – 21:05	(Czech Republic) Sparta Prague	San Mamés, Bilbao	0–0		Sébastien Delferiere (Belgium)

== Transfers ==
=== In ===
Date	Pos.	Name	From	Transfer Fee
1 July 2012	FW	(Spain) Aritz Aduriz	(Spain) Valencia CF	€2.5M
1 July 2012	MF	(Spain) Ismael López	(Spain) CD Lugo	Free
1 July 2012	GK	(Spain) Iago Herrerín	(Spain) Atlético Madrid B	Free

=== Out ===
Date	Pos.	Name	To	Transfer Fee
2 July 2012	FW	(Spain) Iñigo Díaz de Cerio	(Spain) CD Mirandés	Free
6 July 2012	DF	(Spain) Koikili	(Spain) CD Mirandés	Free
10 July 2012	MF	(Spain) Igor Gabilondo	(Cyprus) AEK Larnaca	Free
25 July 2012	MF	(Spain) Pablo Orbaiz	(Russia) Rubin Kazan	Free
29 August 2012	MF	(Spain) Javi Martínez	(Germany) Bayern Munich	€40M
31 August 2012	MF	(Spain) Galder Cerrajería	(Spain) Real Oviedo	Free
31 August 2012	MF	(Spain) David López	(England) Brighton & Hove Albion	Free
31 August 2012	DF	(Spain) Ustaritz		Released
29 January 2013	GK	(Spain) Aitor Fernández	(Spain) Villarreal B	Free

=== Loan out ===
Date from	Date to	Pos.	Name	To
1 July 2012	30 June 2013	GK	(Spain) Iago Herrerín	(Spain) CD Numancia
17 July 2012	30 June 2013	DF	(Spain) Iban Zubiaurre	(Spain) UD Salamanca
28 August 2012	30 June 2013	FW	(Spain) Mikel Orbegozo	(Spain) Sestao River

== See also ==
- Athletic Bilbao in European football
