= Markel Susaeta =

Spanish footballer (born 1987)

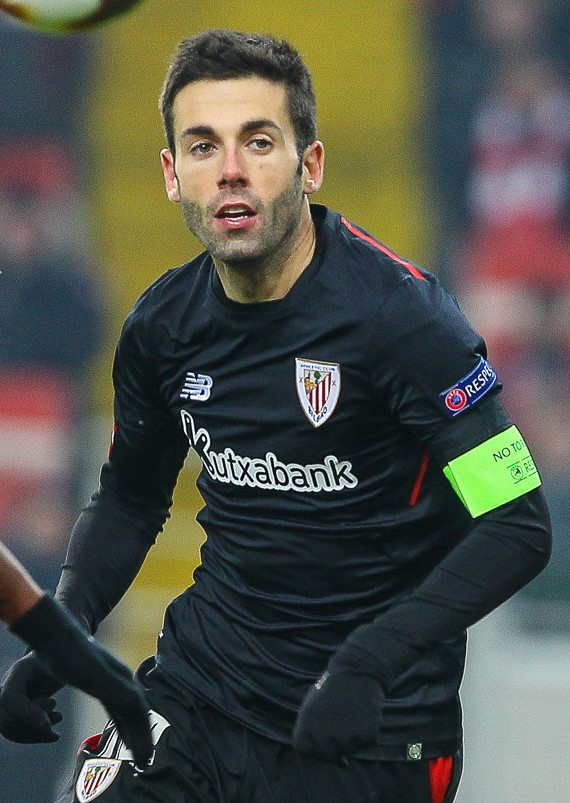
- Susaeta with Athletic Bilbao in 2018

Personal information
- Full name: Markel Susaeta Laskurain
- Date of birth: 14 December 1987 (age 38)
- Place of birth: Eibar, Spain
- Height: 1.79 m (5 ft 10 in)
- Position: Winger

Youth career
- 1997–2005: Athletic Bilbao

Senior career*
Years	Team	Apps	(Gls)
2005–2006	Basconia	36	(4)
2006–2008	Bilbao Athletic	41	(3)
2007–2019	Athletic Bilbao	379	(38)
2019–2020	Gamba Osaka	5	(0)
2020	Melbourne City	10	(2)
2020–2021	Macarthur	21	(5)
Total		492	(52)

International career
2007–2008	Spain U21	3	(0)
2010–2016	Basque Country	7	(1)
2012	Spain	1	(1)
- * Club domestic league appearances and goals

Markel Susaeta Laskurain (Basque: [markel s̺us̺aeta las̺kuɾain], Spanish: [ˈmaɾkel susaˈeta laskuˈɾajn]; born 14 December 1987) is a Spanish former professional footballer who played as a right winger.

He spent almost the entirety of his career with Athletic Bilbao after making his debut with the first team in 2007, appearing in 507 competitive matches and scoring 56 goals for the club. He also played in Japan with Gamba Osaka, and in Australia with Melbourne City and Macarthur.

Susaeta won one full cap for Spain in 2012.

== Club career ==
=== Athletic Bilbao ===
Born in Eibar, Gipuzkoa, Susaeta came through the ranks of Athletic Bilbao, spending one season with the farm team and another with the B side. At the start of 2007–08 he was also registered for the reserves, but was given his first-team debut on 2 September 2007 and managed to score in a 3–1 loss at FC Barcelona. He finished with 29 La Liga appearances, netting on four occasions.

In the following years, Susaeta established himself firmly in the first team, although still not an undisputed starter for the Basques. On 31 January 2009, he scored four minutes from time to give his team a 3–2 home win against Málaga CF, in an eventual narrow escape from relegation. He added six games in that campaign's Copa del Rey, and they reached the final against Barcelona.

Susaeta netted a career-best 13 official goals in 2011–12, including five in the season's UEFA Europa League as Athletic went all the way to the final. The Lions also reached the decisive match in the domestic cup, once again against Barcelona.

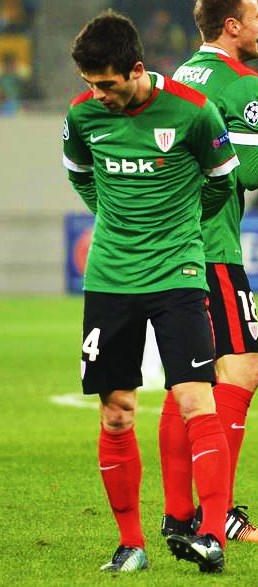
Susaeta prior to a UEFA Champions League match in 2014

Susaeta came on as a substitute in the 2015 Spanish Cup final, once more lost to Barcelona. He took the field in both legs of the following edition of the Supercopa de España, in which his team finally overcame the same opponent.

In September 2016, Susaeta broke the club record for appearances in European competition, passing the total of 55 set in the 1970s by goalkeeper José Ángel Iribar. In January 2019, he played in his 500th competitive match for Athletic, becoming only the fifth player in their history to reach that milestone (but still some way short of the overall record held by Iribar).

It was announced that Susaeta would leave at the end of the 2018–19 season when his contract ended; the player later commented that it had been his intention to play at San Mamés for his entire career and expressed disappointment at the circumstances. The club's final home match involved tributes to him, as well as fellow long-serving squad members Ander Iturraspe and Mikel Rico who were also departing in similar circumstances.

=== Later career ===
On 9 September 2019, Susaeta joined J1 League club Gamba Osaka. The following 15 January, having made just seven appearances in Japan, he signed for Australia's Melbourne City FC for the rest of the A-League season; he left in mid-July, the delay in his release being due to the COVID-19 pandemic.

Susaeta continued in the Australian top division in November 2020, teaming up with former Athletic teammate Beñat Etxebarria at Macarthur FC. Both retired at the end of the campaign, aged 34.

== International career ==
On 9 November 2012, following a series of good displays, Susaeta was called up to the Spain national team for the first time, being selected by manager Vicente del Bosque for a friendly against Panama on the 14th and scoring the final goal in the 5–1 win in Panama City. He also featured for the unofficial Basque Country regional side.

== Personal life ==
Susaeta's cousin, Néstor, was also a footballer and a winger. He unsuccessfully emerged through Basque neighbours Real Sociedad's youth system, and had a brief spell with Athletic's reserves.

== Career statistics ==
=== Club ===
Appearances and goals by club, season and competition
Club	Season	League			Cup		Europe		Other		Total	
Club	Season	Division	Apps	Goals	Apps	Goals	Apps	Goals	Apps	Goals	Apps	Goals
Basconia	2005–06	Tercera División	36	4	–		–		–		36	4
Bilbao Athletic	2006–07	Segunda División B	36	3	–		–		–		36	3
Bilbao Athletic	2007–08	Segunda División B	5	0	–		–		–		5	0
Bilbao Athletic	Total		41	3	–		–		–		41	3
Athletic Bilbao	2007–08	La Liga	29	4	5	2	–		–		34	6
Athletic Bilbao	2008–09	La Liga	34	1	6	0	–		–		40	1
Athletic Bilbao	2009–10	La Liga	35	4	1	0	9	0	1 (Note: Includes appearances in Supercopa de España)	0	46	4
Athletic Bilbao	2010–11	La Liga	28	1	3	0	–		–		31	1
Athletic Bilbao	2011–12	La Liga	38	6	9	2	16	5	–		63	13
Athletic Bilbao	2012–13	La Liga	36	7	2	0	8	4	–		46	11
Athletic Bilbao	2013–14	La Liga	38	6	5	1	–		–		43	7
Athletic Bilbao	2014–15	La Liga	31	1	8	1	9	1	–		48	3
Athletic Bilbao	2015–16	La Liga	28	3	4	0	13	2	2	0	47	5
Athletic Bilbao	2016–17	La Liga	26	1	3	0	7	0	0	0	36	1
Athletic Bilbao	2017–18	La Liga	34	3	1	0	13	0	0	0	48	3
Athletic Bilbao	2018–19	La Liga	22	1	3	0	0	0	0	0	25	1
Athletic Bilbao	Total		379	38	50	6	75	12	3	0	507	56
Gamba Osaka	2019	J1 League	5	0	2	0	–		–		7	0
Melbourne City	2019–20	A-League	10	2	0	0	–		–		10	2
Macarthur	2020–21	A-League	21	5	0	0	–		2	0	23	5
Career total			492	52	52	6	75	12	5	0	624	70

=== International ===
Appearances and goals by national team and year
National team	Year	Apps	Goals
Spain	2012	1	1
Total		1	1

Scores and results list Spain's goal tally first, score column indicates score after each Susaeta goal.

List of international goals scored by Markel Susaeta
No.	Date	Venue	Opponent	Score	Result	Competition
1	14 November 2012	Rommel Fernández, Panama City, Panama	Panama	5–0	5–1	Friendly

== Honours ==
Athletic Bilbao

- Supercopa de España: 2015; runner-up: 2009
- UEFA Europa League runner-up: 2011–12
- Copa del Rey runner-up: 2008–09, 2011–12, 2014–15
