= Mikel San José =

Spanish footballer (born 1989)

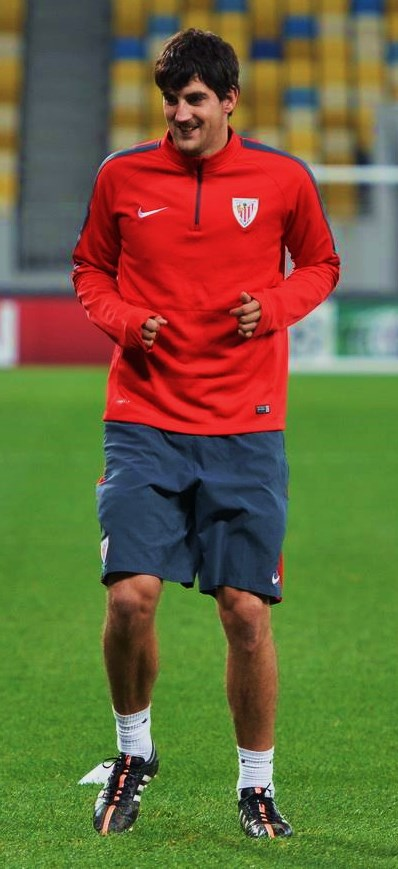
- San José training with Athletic Bilbao in 2014

Personal information
- Full name: Mikel San José Domínguez
- Date of birth: 30 May 1989 (age 37)
- Place of birth: Pamplona, Spain
- Height: 1.88 m (6 ft 2 in)
- Positions: Defensive midfielder; centre-back

Youth career
- Chantrea
- 2005–2007: Athletic Bilbao

Senior career*
| Years | Team | Apps | (Gls) |
| 2007–2010 | Liverpool | 0 | (0) |
| 2009–2010 | → Athletic Bilbao (loan) | 25 | (1) |
| 2010–2020 | Athletic Bilbao | 279 | (26) |
| 2020–2021 | Birmingham City | 27 | (0) |
| 2021–2022 | Amorebieta | 27 | (1) |
| Total | | 358 | (28) |

International career
| 2007–2008 | Spain U19 | 16 | (0) |
| 2009–2011 | Spain U21 | 8 | (1) |
| 2012 | Spain U23 | 1 | (0) |
| 2014–2016 | Spain | 7 | (0) |
| 2011–2019 | Basque Country | 7 | (0) |
- * Club domestic league appearances and goals

Mikel San José Domínguez (Basque: [mikel s̺an xos̺e dominɡes̻]; Spanish: [ˈmikel saŋ xoˈse ðoˈmiŋɡeθ]; (Note: In isolation, San and Domínguez are pronounced [san] and [doˈmiŋɡeθ] respectively.) born 30 May 1989) is a Spanish former professional footballer who played as a defensive midfielder or centre-back.

After starting out at Liverpool's reserves San José joined Athletic Bilbao in 2009, initially on loan, and went on to make 397 competitive appearances for the club (winning the 2015 Supercopa de España) before his departure in 2020. He then spent a season back in England with Championship club Birmingham City, and retired in 2022 after one year at Amorebieta in the Segunda División.

San José won European Championships with Spain at under-19 and under-21 level. He made his senior international debut in 2014, and was a member of the squad at the UEFA Euro 2016 tournament.

== Club career ==
=== Early career ===
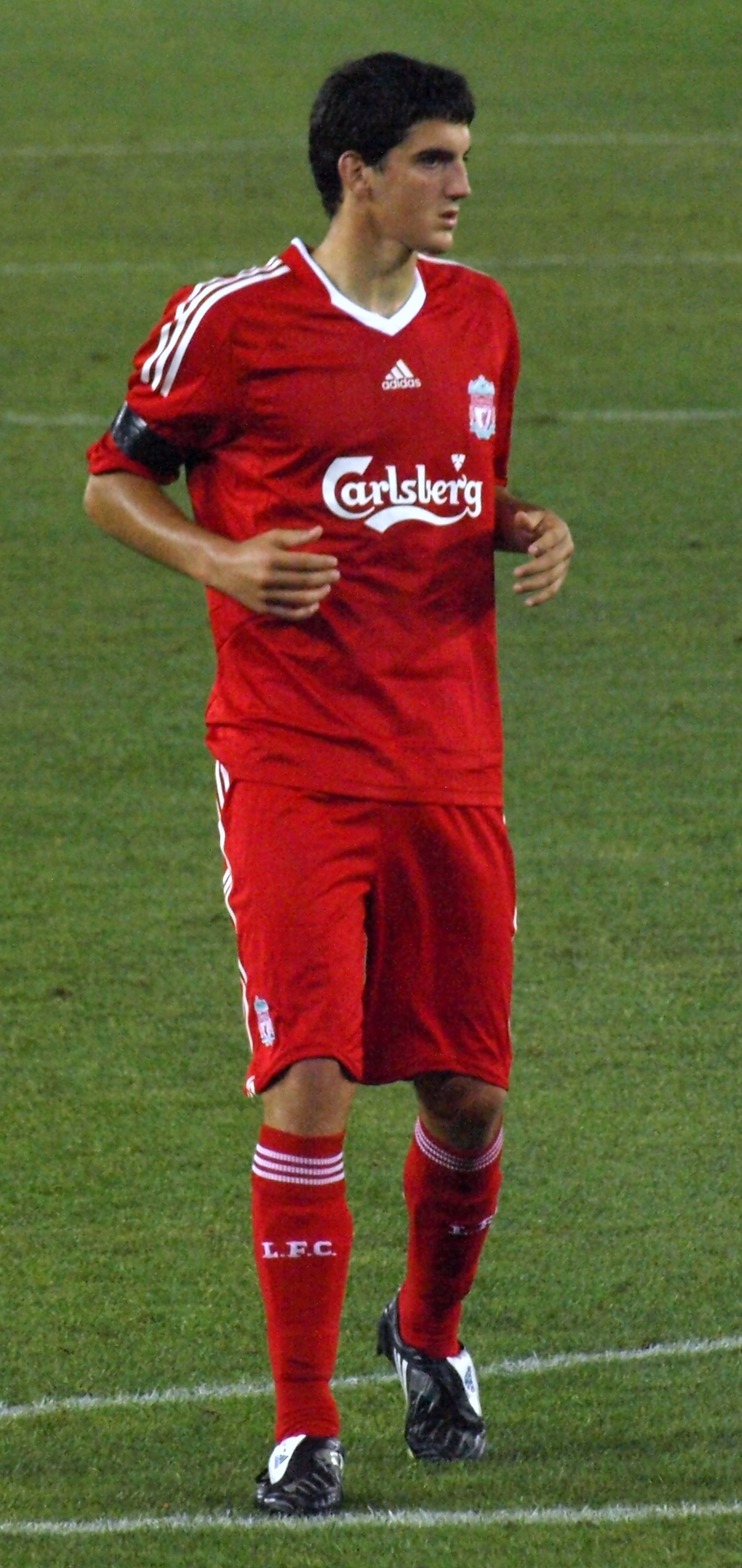
San José playing for Liverpool in 2009

San José was born in Pamplona, Navarre, where by the age of six he was playing football at Txantrea, a nursery club of the Basque Country-based Athletic Bilbao. At 16, he left home to join Athletic's academy, where he began at Juvenil B level and moved up to the Juvenil A team for the 2006–07 season, during which he made 27 appearances and scored five goals.

In August 2007, Premier League club Liverpool confirmed that the 18-year-old San José had joined on a three-year contract for a fee reported as €400,000. He believed he had a greater chance of top-flight football via Liverpool's reserves than by accepting what he saw as an unconvincing offer of bypassing Athletic's third team to play for their B team in the Segunda División B. Over the next two seasons, he played regularly for Liverpool Reserves, and helped them win the 2007–08 Premier Reserve League title. He frequently trained with the first team, but the closest he came to playing for them was in February 2008 as an unused substitute against Chelsea.

=== Athletic return ===
In August 2009, San José returned to Athletic Bilbao on a season-long loan to gain more first-team experience. He was given the number 12 shirt, and made his debut on 17 September 2009 in a 3–0 group stage home win against Austria Wien in the 2009–10 UEFA Europa League. It was reported in early November 2009 that he was frustrated by the lack of first-team opportunities, and that if this did not improve he would look to shorten the loan agreement and move either back to Liverpool or on loan to another club in January 2010; he finally made his La Liga debut on the 8th, playing the last two minutes of the 2–0 away win over Racing Santander, and finished the campaign with 30 overall appearances, netting three times.

On 19 May 2010, San José was signed permanently by Athletic on a five-year contract. In his first year, he was periodically charged with penalty-taking by manager Joaquín Caparrós, replacing longtime regular Andoni Iraola.

In his first Basque derby against Real Sociedad, at the Anoeta Stadium on 5 December 2010, the first goal was scored from a penalty conceded by San José, who scored an own goal early in the second half to complete the 2–0 defeat. The following season, he was an unused substitute in the Copa del Rey and the Europa League finals, both lost.

San José finished the 2012–13 campaign with six goals in all competitions comprised, five in the league as the Lions finished 12th, and was often utilized as a defensive midfielder by coach Marcelo Bielsa. His other successful strike was his first in a European competition, in a 3–3 draw away to HJK in the Europa League play-off round second leg.

San José scored the first ever goal for Athletic Bilbao at the new San Mamés Stadium on 16 September 2013, from close range in a 3–2 defeat of Celta Vigo. He began to be overshadowed by fellow youth graduate Aymeric Laporte, however.

On 25 November 2014, San José scored his first goal in the UEFA Champions League, the only one in a group match away to Shakhtar Donetsk – nonetheless, the opponents advanced at Athletic's expense. He also netted the opening goal of a 4–0 win against Barcelona in the first leg of the 2015 Supercopa de España, striking from 46 metres (50 yd) after a clearance from opposing goalkeeper Marc-André ter Stegen.

In September 2019, San José reached the milestone of ten years with the same club. On 24 November, he celebrated his 300th appearance in the Spanish top division in a 2–1 away victory against Osasuna, breaking a 31–game undefeated streak of the hosts at their El Sadar Stadium.

In July 2020, Athletic confirmed that San José's contract would not be extended beyond that summer, although the departure was delayed beyond its usual June expiry after the season was postponed due to the COVID-19 pandemic in Spain. His contribution (along with long-serving colleague Beñat Etxebarria, also leaving in similar circumstances) was acknowledged at the last home fixture on 16 July 2020 in an empty San Mamés – he was in the matchday squad but did not leave the bench, with his last appearance four months earlier in the Spanish Cup semi-finals; His team won that tie, but the circumstances of the delay and the end of his spell at the club meant he would have no opportunity to take part in the final.

=== Birmingham City ===
On 21 September 2020, San José signed a two-year deal with English Championship club Birmingham City, whose head coach was fellow Basque Aitor Karanka. He made his first-team debut, on 20 October away to Norwich City, in unfortunate circumstances: midfielder Adam Clayton was sent off after 86 goalless minutes, but before there was a stoppage in play to allow San José to come on, Norwich scored the winning goal. He made what the Birmingham Mail dubbed an authoritative full debut playing in central midfield, looking "assured on the ball, intelligent off it", and away to Preston North End a week later he "looked even more accomplished" in the centre of a back three before moving into midfield from where he crossed the ball for Gary Gardner's winning goal. As matches – and poor results – became more frequent, San José's level of performance dropped, he appeared to tire, mistakes appeared, and he lost his place in the matchday squad. Under new head coach Lee Bowyer, he seemed back to his best in a second-half cameo away to Derby County as Birmingham avoided relegation, but on 28 May, his contract was terminated by mutual consent at his own request.

=== Amorebieta ===
On 8 July 2021, San José returned to Spain, signing a one-year deal with the newly promoted Segunda División club Amorebieta. He played 27 games as they were relegated, plus one in the cup, scoring once on 2 April to open a 3–1 home win over Ibiza. He announced his retirement from professional football on 14 August 2022.

== International career ==
San José was part of the Spanish team who captured the 2007 UEFA European Under-19 Championship. Having made 16 appearances in that category, he progressed to the under-21s in early 2009.

On 29 August 2014, San José was named by full side manager Vicente del Bosque in a 23-man squad for matches against France and Macedonia in September. He made his debut on 4 September, featuring the full 90 minutes in a 0–1 friendly loss to the former, and was subsequently selected for the UEFA Euro 2016 tournament alongside Athletic teammate Aritz Aduriz.

San José also made seven appearances for the Basque Country representative team between 2011 and 2019.

== Career statistics ==
=== Club ===
Appearances and goals by club, season and competition
| Club | Season | League | | | National cup (Note: Includes Copa del Rey, FA Cup) | | Europe | | Other | | Total | |
| Club | Season | Division | Apps | Goals | Apps | Goals | Apps | Goals | Apps | Goals | Apps | Goals |
|---|---|---|---|---|---|---|---|---|---|---|---|---|
| Athletic Bilbao | 2009–10 | La Liga | 25 | 1 | 0 | 0 | 5 (Note: Appearances in UEFA Europa League) | 2 | — | | 30 | 3 |
| Athletic Bilbao | 2010–11 | La Liga | 31 | 2 | 3 | 0 | — | | — | | 34 | 2 |
| Athletic Bilbao | 2011–12 | La Liga | 24 | 2 | 6 | 1 | 8 | 0 | — | | 38 | 3 |
| Athletic Bilbao | 2012–13 | La Liga | 34 | 5 | 2 | 0 | 4 | 1 | — | | 40 | 6 |
| Athletic Bilbao | 2013–14 | La Liga | 25 | 5 | 5 | 0 | — | | — | | 30 | 5 |
| Athletic Bilbao | 2014–15 | La Liga | 28 | 5 | 6 | 1 | 9 (Note: Seven appearances and two goals in UEFA Champions League, two appearances in Europa League) | 2 | — | | 43 | 8 |
| Athletic Bilbao | 2015–16 | La Liga | 34 | 2 | 6 | 0 | 10 | 1 | 1 (Note: Appearance in Supercopa de España) | 1 | 51 | 4 |
| Athletic Bilbao | 2016–17 | La Liga | 35 | 4 | 3 | 0 | 6 | 0 | 0 | 0 | 44 | 4 |
| Athletic Bilbao | 2017–18 | La Liga | 26 | 1 | 1 | 0 | 11 | 0 | — | | 38 | 1 |
| Athletic Bilbao | 2018–19 | La Liga | 33 | 0 | 4 | 1 | 0 | 0 | — | | 37 | 1 |
| Athletic Bilbao | 2019–20 | La Liga | 9 | 0 | 3 | 0 | — | | — | | 12 | 0 |
| Athletic Bilbao | Total | | 304 | 27 | 39 | 3 | 53 | 6 | 1 | 1 | 397 | 37 |
| Birmingham City | 2020–21 | Championship | 27 | 0 | 1 | 0 | — | | — | | 28 | 0 |
| Amorebieta | 2021–22 | Segunda División | 27 | 1 | 1 | 0 | — | | — | | 28 | 1 |
| Career total | | | 358 | 28 | 41 | 3 | 53 | 6 | 1 | 1 | 453 | 38 |

=== International ===
Appearances and goals by national team and year
| National team | Year | Apps | Goals |
|---|---|---|---|
| Spain | 2014 | 1 | 0 |
| Spain | 2015 | 3 | 0 |
| Spain | 2016 | 3 | 0 |
| Total | | 7 | 0 |

== Honours ==
Athletic Bilbao

- Supercopa de España: 2015; runner-up 2009
- UEFA Europa League runner-up: 2011–12
- Copa del Rey runner-up: 2011–12, 2014–15

Spain U19

- UEFA European Under-19 Championship: 2007

Spain U21

- UEFA European Under-21 Championship: 2011
