= Raúl García (footballer, born 1976) =

Spanish footballer

Personal information
- Full name: Raúl García Fernández
- Date of birth: 30 June 1976 (age 50)
- Place of birth: Hernani, Spain
- Height: 1.78 m (5 ft 10 in)
- Position: Defender

Senior career*
Years	Team	Apps	(Gls)
1994–1997	Real Unión	100	(2)
1997–1998	Racing Ferrol	23	(0)
1998–2002	Barakaldo	132	(1)
2002–2005	Burgos	100	(2)
2005–2006	Palencia	20	(0)
2006–2007	Burgos	33	(0)
2007–2009	Eibar	69	(0)
2009–2013	Mirandés	91	(4)
Total		568	(9)
- * Club domestic league appearances and goals

Raúl García Fernández (born 30 June 1976) is a Spanish former professional footballer who played as a defender. He could occupy all three defensive positions.

He amassed Segunda División B totals of 493 matches and eight goals over 16 seasons, representing in the competition six clubs, mainly Barakaldo and Burgos.

== Club career ==
Born in Hernani, Gipuzkoa, García's 19-year senior career was spent mainly in the lower leagues of his country, mostly with Barakaldo CF, Burgos CF (four years apiece) and CD Mirandés (three). He played 75 games in the Segunda División over three seasons, with SD Eibar and Mirandés.

During the 2012–13 campaign, whilst with the latter side, the 36-year-old García suffered an injury to the meniscus in his left knee, being sidelined for several months. He scored his only goal in the second tier on 20 October 2012, contributing decisively to a 1–1 home draw against Girona FC. He left the club in July of the following year, and retired shortly after.
