= Gaizka Toquero =

Spanish footballer (born 1984)

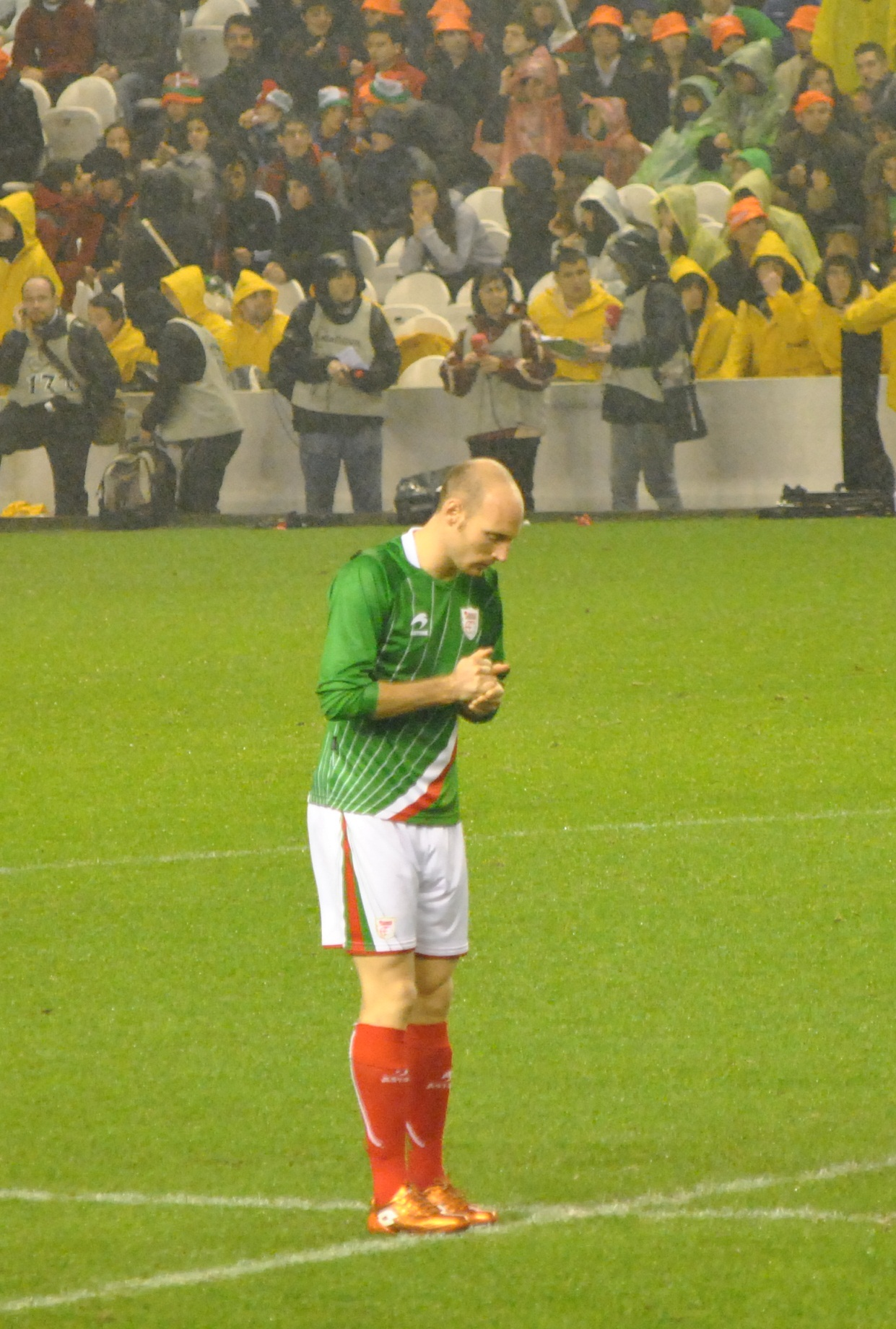
- Toquero with Euskadi in 2011

Personal information
- Full name: Gaizka Toquero Pinedo
- Date of birth: 9 August 1984 (age 42)
- Place of birth: Vitoria, Spain
- Height: 1.82 m (6 ft 0 in)
- Positions: Winger; forward

Youth career
- Alavés
- 2001–2002: Ariznabarra
- 2002–2003: Real Sociedad

Senior career*
Years	Team	Apps	(Gls)
2003–2005	Alavés C	16	(3)
2005–2006	Alavés B	29	(2)
2006–2007	Lemona	33	(0)
2007–2008	Sestao	37	(5)
2008–2015	Athletic Bilbao	156	(20)
2008	→ Eibar (loan)	16	(4)
2015–2017	Alavés	62	(10)
2017–2019	Zaragoza	27	(4)
Total		376	(48)

International career
2010–2016	Basque Country	7	(2)
- * Club domestic league appearances and goals

Gaizka Toquero Pinedo (born 9 August 1984) is a Spanish former professional footballer who played mainly as a right winger.

He spent most of his career with Athletic Bilbao, appearing in 207 competitive matches over seven La Liga seasons and scoring 24 goals, becoming a fan favourite for his endeavour.

== Club career ==
=== Early years ===
Toquero was born in Vitoria-Gasteiz, Álava. Following a brief youth spell at Real Sociedad, and three years with both reserve teams of Deportivo Alavés where he had also featured in his teens, he started playing professionally for SD Lemona in the 2006–07 season, later joining Basque neighbours Sestao River Club (both clubs were in the Segunda División B).

While at Sestao, Athletic Bilbao showed interest in acquiring Toquero, who eventually signed in 2008. After not being part of Joaquín Caparrós' plans in pre-season, he was loaned to neighbouring SD Eibar greatly due to new manager Carlos Pouso, who had coached the player before.

=== Athletic Bilbao ===
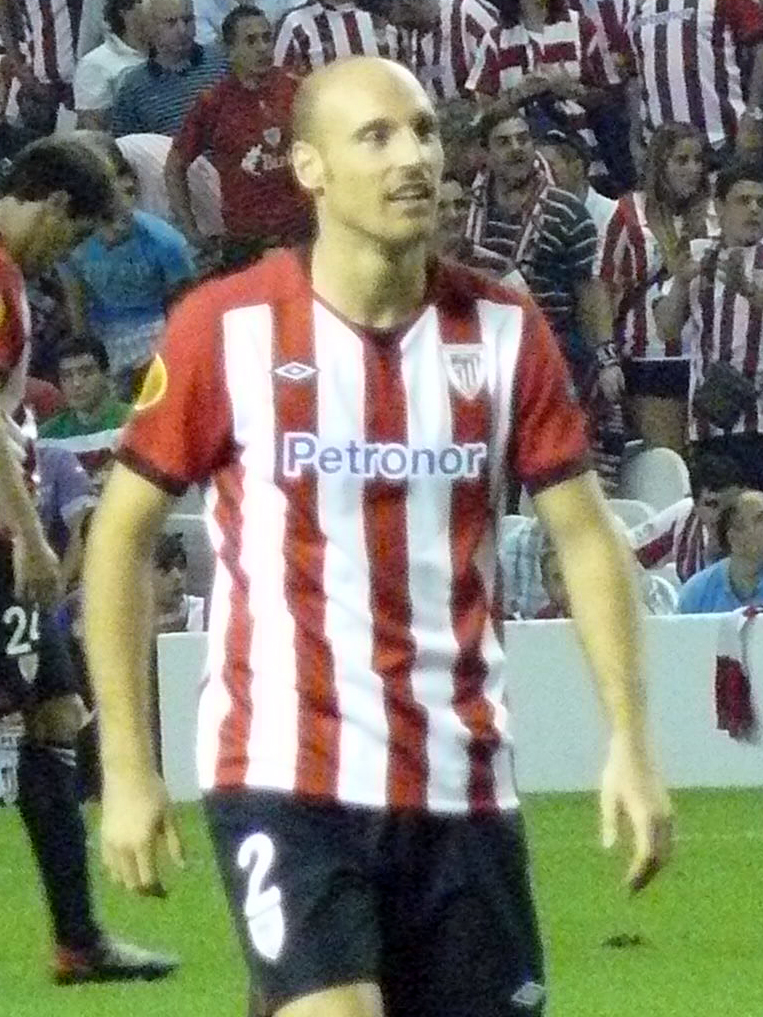
Toquero in action for Athletic Bilbao in 2011

After 15 matches in 2008–09's Segunda División, Toquero was recalled by Athletic on 4 January 2009, making his La Liga debut six days later by appearing as a second-half substitute in a 1–1 home draw against RCD Espanyol. He scored his first goal for the team on 4 March in a 3–0 home win in the Copa del Rey over Sevilla FC (4–2 on aggregate) which qualified them for the final; there, he opened the scoring, albeit in a 4–1 loss to FC Barcelona.

A player with a tremendous workrate, Toquero was affectionately nicknamed Lehendakari, and grew into a top-division player in 2009–10. He started most of the campaign as an attacking complement to Fernando Llorente, and also found the net on several occasions, notably a double against Real Valladolid on 7 March 2010 in a 2–0 home victory.

Toquero once again was a regular starter for Athletic during 2010–11, opening his official goal account on 30 January 2011 by netting twice in a 2–0 win at Atlético Madrid. At the end of the following season, he came off the bench in both the UEFA Europa League and the Spanish Cup finals, both of which ended in 3–0 defeats. In October 2012 he renewed his contract, due to expire in June 2013, for three more years.

Toquero made one substitute appearance in the 2014–15 edition of the UEFA Champions League, in a 2–1 group stage away loss against FC BATE Borisov. His last game for the club (he totalled less than 50 minutes for the campaign) was in the dying moments of a 1–0 league win over Real Madrid, on 7 May 2015.

=== Alavés ===
On 10 July 2015, Toquero cut ties with Athletic and returned to Alavés four days later after agreeing to a two-year deal. He was ever-present in his first season, scoring nine goals in 39 starts as the team returned to the top tier after a ten-year wait; he added 23 with one goal in the second, and played a part in their run to the domestic cup final, although he was an unused substitute in the showpiece match.

As his contract at Mendizorrotza Stadium was finally not renewed, Toquero decided to train with hometown minnows CD Aurrerá de Vitoria in the close season while considering his options for the future.

=== Zaragoza ===
On 4 August 2017, Toquero signed a one-year deal with second division club Real Zaragoza. On 29 May 2019, after nearly a year without playing an official match due to complications from a knee injury, the 34-year-old announced his retirement.

== International career ==
Toquero did not represent Spain at any level. He played seven matches for the Basque Country representative side, and scored twice in a 6–1 win over Bolivia at the Anoeta Stadium on 29 December 2012.

== Career statistics ==
Appearances and goals by club, season and competition
Club	Season	League			Cup		Other		Total	
Club	Season	Division	Apps	Goals	Apps	Goals	Apps	Goals	Apps	Goals
Alavés B	2005–06	Segunda División B	29	4	0	0	0	0	29	4
Lemona	2006–07	Segunda División B	33	0	0	0	0	0	33	0
Sestao	2007–08	Segunda División B	37	5	1	0	0	0	38	5
Athletic Bilbao	2008–09	La Liga	20	1	6	2	0	0	26	3
Athletic Bilbao	2009–10	La Liga	31	8	2	0	11 (Note: Nine appearances in UEFA Europa League, two appearances in Supercopa de España)	0	44	8
Athletic Bilbao	2010–11	La Liga	30	7	3	0	0	0	33	7
Athletic Bilbao	2011–12	La Liga	35	4	7	1	14 (Note: Appearances in UEFA Europa League)	0	56	5
Athletic Bilbao	2012–13	La Liga	16	0	1	0	5	1	22	1
Athletic Bilbao	2013–14	La Liga	20	0	1	0	0	0	21	0
Athletic Bilbao	2014–15	La Liga	4	0	0	0	1 (Note: Appearance in UEFA Champions League)	0	5	0
Athletic Bilbao	Total		156	20	20	3	31	1	207	24
Eibar (loan)	2008–09	Segunda División	16	4	1	0	0	0	17	4
Alavés	2015–16	Segunda División	39	9	2	0	0	0	41	9
Alavés	2016–17	La Liga	23	1	5	2	0	0	28	3
Alavés	Total		62	10	7	2	0	0	69	12
Zaragoza	2017–18	Segunda División	27	4	1	0	2 (Note: Appearances in La Liga play-offs)	0	30	4
Career total			360	47	30	5	33	1	423	53

== Honours ==
Athletic Bilbao

- Copa del Rey runner-up: 2008–09, 2011–12
- Supercopa de España runner-up: 2009
- UEFA Europa League runner-up: 2011–12

Alavés

- Segunda División: 2015–16
- Copa del Rey runner-up: 2016–17
