= Javi Martínez (footballer, born 1989) =

Spanish footballer

Personal information
- Full name: Javier Martínez Benito
- Date of birth: 5 September 1989 (age 37)
- Place of birth: Nájera, Spain
- Height: 1.82 m (6 ft 0 in)
- Position: Forward

Team information
- Current team: Náxara

Youth career
- Náxara

Senior career*
Years	Team	Apps	(Gls)
2009–2010	Náxara	33	(21)
2010–2012	Racing B	59	(24)
2012	Racing Santander	4	(0)
2012–2013	Náxara	11	(6)
2013	Izarra	13	(2)
2013–	Náxara	134	(75)
- * Club domestic league appearances and goals as of 20 May 2018

Javier 'Javi' Martínez Benito (born 5 September 1989 in Nájera, La Rioja) is a Spanish footballer who plays for Náxara CD mainly as a forward.

== Club career ==
After finishing his formation with Racing de Santander, Martínez made his first-team – and La Liga – debut on 22 March 2012, playing 34 minutes in a 0–3 away loss against Sevilla FC. He spent the vast majority of his spell with the Cantabrians registered with the B-team.

In summer 2012, Martínez signed a contract with Náxara CD in Tercera División. In the following transfer window, however, he joined Segunda División B club CD Izarra.
