= Jon Aurtenetxe =

Spanish footballer (born 1992)

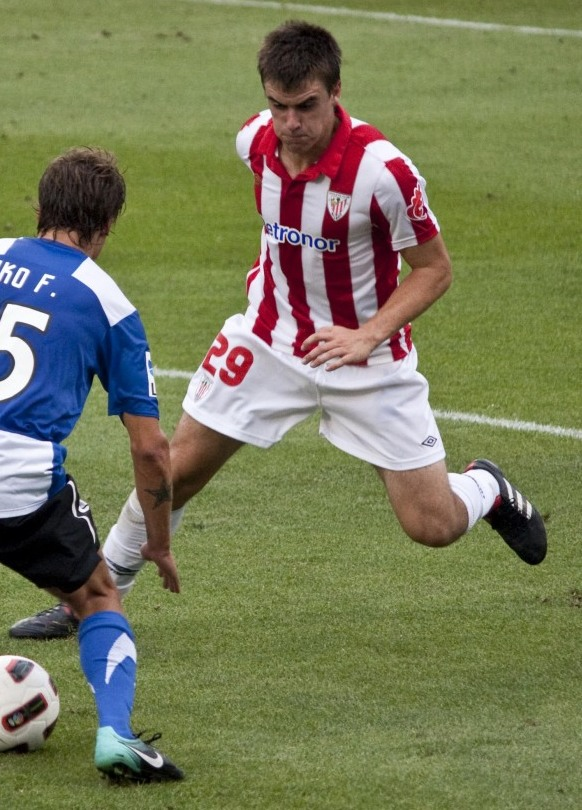
- Aurtenetxe with Athletic Bilbao in 2010

Personal information
- Full name: Jon Aurtenetxe Borde
- Date of birth: 3 January 1992 (age 34)
- Place of birth: Amorebieta, Spain
- Height: 1.82 m (6 ft 0 in)
- Position: Defender

Youth career
- 2001–2002: Amorebieta
- 2002–2011: Athletic Bilbao

Senior career*
Years	Team	Apps	(Gls)
2009–2016	Athletic Bilbao	72	(2)
2011	Athletic Bilbao B	3	(0)
2013–2014	→ Celta (loan)	20	(0)
2015–2016	→ Tenerife (loan)	23	(0)
2016–2017	Mirandés	17	(1)
2017	Amorebieta	2	(0)
2017–2018	Dundee	16	(0)
2018–2019	Amorebieta	16	(2)
2019	Adelaide Comets	17	(1)
2019–2020	Atlético Baleares	22	(0)
2021	Las Rozas	16	(1)
2021–2023	Miedź Legnica	40	(1)
2023–2024	Logroñés	30	(0)
2024–2025	Amorebieta	4	(0)
Total		298	(8)

International career
2008–2009	Spain U17	8	(0)
2010–2011	Spain U19	8	(1)
2012–2013	Spain U21	2	(0)
2011–2017	Basque Country	4	(0)
Medal record
Men's football
Representing Spain
UEFA European Under-19 Championship
Winner	2011 Romania
FIFA U-17 World Cup
Third place	2009 Nigeria
- * Club domestic league appearances and goals

Jon Aurtenetxe Borde (born 3 January 1992) is a Spanish former professional footballer who played mainly as a left-back but also as a central defender.

== Club career ==
=== Athletic Bilbao ===
Born in Amorebieta-Etxano, Biscay, Aurtenetxe joined Athletic Bilbao's youth system at the age of 10, arriving from neighbouring SD Amorebieta and being a finalist in the Copa del Rey Juvenil in 2009– he would lift the trophy the following year. On 16 December of that year, even before playing his first game with the reserves, the 17-year-old appeared for the first team in the UEFA Europa League, featuring the full 90 minutes in a 3–0 group stage home loss against SV Werder Bremen.

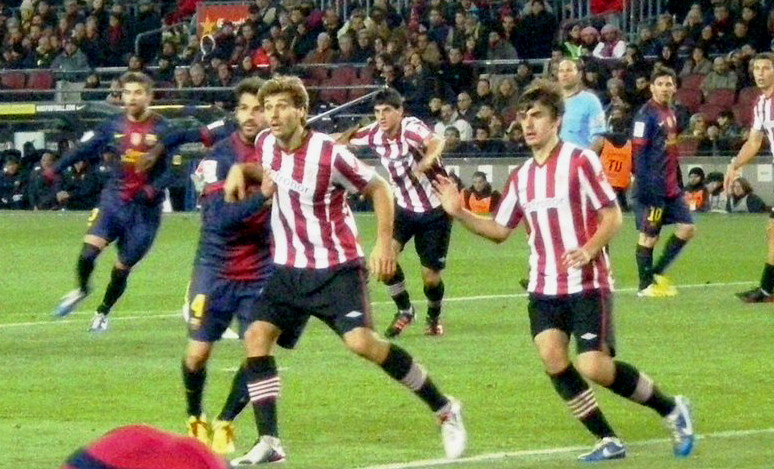
Aurtenetxe (right) playing against Barcelona in 2012

Aurtenetxe made his La Liga debut on 28 August 2010, starting and being booked in a 1–0 win at Hércules CF. His season was curtailed by a serious shoulder injury, and he was definitely promoted to the main squad for 2011–12 under new manager Marcelo Bielsa; he played 54 official matches during the campaign and scored four goals to help the Basques to reach both the Copa del Rey and the Europa League finals, netting an important one in the club's 2–1 away defeat to Sporting CP in the latter competition's semi-finals (4–3 aggregate victory).

Aurtenetxe was a regular selection for Athletic in 2012–13 but, after the appointment of Ernesto Valverde as manager, he was overlooked for Mikel Balenziaga and featured rarely. He served loans at top-flight RC Celta de Vigo and CD Tenerife of Segunda División, and in summer 2016 he terminated his contract and moved to second-tier side CD Mirandés on a one-year deal.

=== Amorebieta and Dundee ===
In August 2017, after some weeks without a club, Aurtenexte joined Segunda División B's Amorebieta, returning to where he had played as a child 15 years earlier and reuniting with his former Athletic teammate Joseba Etxeberria who was now acting as manager. On 29 August, it was announced that he had left.

On 30 August 2017, Aurtenetxe signed for Dundee on a contract until January 2018. He made his Scottish Premiership debut on 28 October, coming on as a 64th-minute substitute in a 3–1 home loss against Hamilton Academical. He agreed to a new deal on 12 January 2018 that kept him at Dens Park until the end of the season, following which he was released.

Aurtenetxe returned to Amorebieta for the 2018 pre-season, on the same understanding as the previous year that he would be allowed to leave if he received a better offer from another club. On 19 July, he acted as captain in a friendly against former employers Athletic Bilbao.

=== Later career ===
In late December 2018, Aurtenetxe agreed to join Australian National Premier League side Adelaide Comets FC for the upcoming season, with the deal being made effective the following month. He returned to Spain and its third level on 18 July 2019, signing a one-year contract at CD Atlético Baleares.

On 4 July 2021, following a brief spell at Madrid-based Las Rozas CF, Aurtenetxe moved abroad again with Miedź Legnica in the Polish I liga. He was crowned champion in his first season, with the subsequent promotion to the Ekstraklasa. He left by mutual consent in February 2023, after eight top-division appearances.

Aurtenetxe went back to his homeland in July 2023, signing for Primera Federación club SD Logroñés. On 6 August 2024, he returned for a third stint at Amorebieta.

== International career ==
Aurtenetxe won two caps for the Spain under-21 team in as many friendlies. His debut was on 13 November 2012, in a 3–1 defeat of Italy in Siena.

== Career statistics ==
As of match played 11 January 2019

Appearances and goals by club, season and competition
Club	Season	League			National cup		League cup		Europe		Other		Total	
Club	Season	Division	Apps	Goals	Apps	Goals	Apps	Goals	Apps	Goals	Apps	Goals	Apps	Goals
Bilbao Athletic	2010–11	Segunda División B	3	0	–		–		–		–		3	0
Athletic Bilbao	2009–10	La Liga	0	0	0	0	–		1 (Note: Appearances in UEFA Europa League)	0	0	0	1	0
Athletic Bilbao	2010–11	La Liga	10	0	2	0	–		–		–		12	0
Athletic Bilbao	2011–12	La Liga	31	1	9	1	–		14	2	–		54	4
Athletic Bilbao	2012–13	La Liga	27	1	2	0	–		2	0	–		31	1
Athletic Bilbao	2014–15	La Liga	4	0	2	0	–		1	0	–		7	0
Athletic Bilbao	Total		72	2	15	1	0	0	18	2	0	0	105	5
Celta (loan)	2013–14	La Liga	20	0	0	0	–		–		–		20	0
Tenerife (loan)	2015–16	Segunda División	23	0	1	0	–		–		–		24	0
Mirandés	2016–17	Segunda División	17	1	1	0	–		–		–		18	1
Amorebieta	2017–18	Segunda División B	2	0	0	0	–		–		–		2	0
Dundee	2017–18	Scottish Premiership	16	0	2	0	0	0	–		–		18	0
Amorebieta	2018–19	Segunda División B	16	2	0	0	–		–		–		16	2
Career total			169	5	19	1	0	0	18	2	0	0	206	8

== Honours ==
Athletic Bilbao

- Copa del Rey runner-up: 2011–12, 2014–15
- UEFA Europa League runner-up: 2011–12

Miedź Legnica

- I liga: 2021–22

Spain U19

- UEFA European Under-19 Championship: 2011

Spain U17

- FIFA U-17 World Cup third place: 2009
