= Unai Albizua =

Spanish footballer

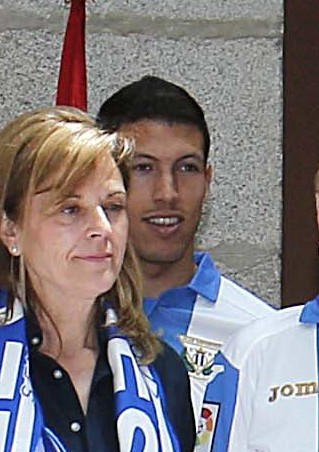
- Albizua (right) with Leganés in 2016

Personal information
- Full name: Unai Albizua Urquijo
- Date of birth: 18 January 1989 (age 37)
- Place of birth: Laudio/Llodio, Spain
- Height: 1.81 m (5 ft 11 1/2 in)
- Position: Centre-back

Youth career
- 2003–2008: Athletic Bilbao

Senior career*
Years	Team	Apps	(Gls)
2007–2010	Basconia	60	(1)
2010–2013	Bilbao Athletic	96	(1)
2013–2015	Athletic Bilbao	4	(0)
2014–2015	→ Tenerife (loan)	28	(0)
2015–2016	Leganés	22	(0)
2016–2017	UCAM Murcia	39	(0)
2017–2019	Cultural Leonesa	24	(0)
2019	Ibiza	11	(0)
2019–2020	UCAM Murcia	9	(0)
2020–2021	Stade Lausanne Ouchy	23	(0)
2021–2022	Cornellà	13	(0)
2022–2023	Orihuela	30	(1)
2023–2024	Portugalete	14	(0)
Total		373	(3)
- * Club domestic league appearances and goals

Unai Albizua Urquijo (born 18 January 1989) is a Spanish former professional footballer who played as a central defender.

== Club career ==
Born in Laudio/Llodio, Álava, Basque Country, Albizua joined Athletic Bilbao's youth system in 2003. He played three full seasons with the reserves in the Segunda División B, captaining them to the 2013 playoffs after a third-place finish in his last.

Albizua was promoted to the first team prior to the beginning of the 2013–14 campaign. On 3 November 2013, he made his La Liga debut, coming on as a 67th-minute substitute in a 2–0 away loss against Atlético Madrid after replacing the injured Aymeric Laporte.

On 15 July 2014, Albizua was loaned to Segunda División club CD Tenerife. Roughly one year later, he moved to CD Leganés of the same league after cutting ties with Athletic.

On 28 July 2016, Albizua signed for UCAM Murcia CF. The following 11 July, he joined Cultural y Deportiva Leonesa still in the second tier.

On 17 August 2021, after one year in the Swiss Challenge League with FC Stade Lausanne Ouchy, the 32-year-old Albizua returned to Spain and signed with UE Cornellà of the newly-formed Primera División RFEF.
