= Álvaro Corral =

Association football player from Spain

Personal information
- Full name: Álvaro Corral Echazarreta
- Date of birth: 30 May 1983 (age 43)
- Place of birth: Logroño, Spain
- Height: 1.86 m (6 ft 1 in)
- Position: Centre back

Team information
- Current team: Tudelano (physio)

Senior career*
Years	Team	Apps	(Gls)
2002–2003	Aurrerá	27	(2)
2003–2005	Recreación	62	(0)
2005–2006	Zamora	22	(0)
2006–2008	Palencia	64	(1)
2008–2009	Sant Andreu	13	(0)
2009	Águilas	10	(0)
2009	Alfaro	15	(1)
2010	Izarra	17	(0)
2010–2016	Mirandés	145	(1)
2016–2019	Tudelano	62	(1)
Total		437	(6)
- * Club domestic league appearances and goals

Álvaro Corral Echazarreta (born 30 May 1983) is a Spanish former professional footballer who played as a central defender, and is the current physical therapist of CD Tudelano.

== Playing career ==
Born in Logroño, La Rioja, Corral spent his first decade as a senior in Segunda División B, starting with CD Aurrerá de Vitoria in 2002 and going on to represent CD Recreación de La Rioja, Zamora CF, CF Palencia, UE Sant Andreu, Águilas CF, CD Izarra and CD Mirandés. He also competed briefly in Tercera División, having played the first part of the 2009–10 season with CD Alfaro.

Corral featured in 26 matches (more than 2,100 minutes of play) in the 2011–12 campaign, as Mirandés promoted to Segunda División for the first time in its history. He made his debut in the competition on 1 September 2012, playing the full 90 minutes in a 4–0 away win against Xerez CD. His first goal was scored on 15 March 2014, in the 2–0 victory at Deportivo Alavés.

In the summer of 2016, after 162 competitive appearances at the Estadio Municipal de Anduva (97 in the second tier), the 33-year-old Corral returned to the lower leagues with CD Tudelano.

== Coaching career ==
Corral retired in January 2019, being immediately appointed team physio at his last club.
