= Ander Iturraspe =

Spanish footballer (born 1989)

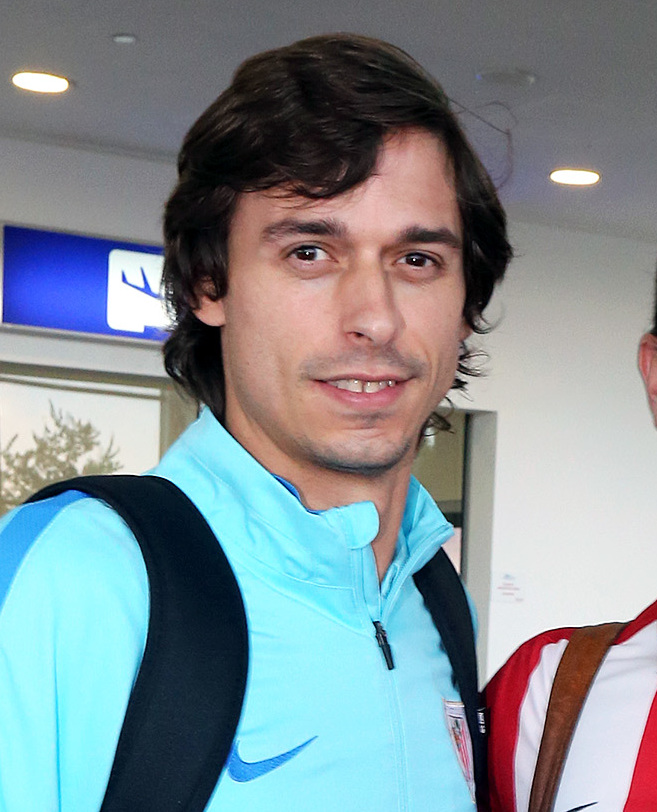
- Iturraspe with Athletic Bilbao in 2015

Personal information
- Full name: Ander Iturraspe Derteano
- Date of birth: 8 March 1989 (age 37)
- Place of birth: Abadiño, Spain
- Height: 1.87 m (6 ft 2 in)
- Position: Defensive midfielder

Youth career
- 1998–1999: Matiena
- 1999–2003: Athletic Bilbao
- 2003–2004: Abadiño
- 2004–2007: Athletic Bilbao

Senior career*
| Years | Team | Apps | (Gls) |
| 2007–2008 | Basconia | 30 | (1) |
| 2008–2010 | Bilbao Athletic | 40 | (1) |
| 2008–2019 | Athletic Bilbao | 232 | (3) |
| 2019–2020 | Espanyol | 8 | (0) |
| Total | | 310 | (5) |

International career
| 2012 | Spain U23 | 1 | (0) |
| 2014 | Spain | 2 | (0) |
| 2011–2016 | Basque Country | 6 | (0) |
- * Club domestic league appearances and goals

Ander Iturraspe Derteano (Basque: [ander ituraspe]; Spanish: [ˈandeɾ ituˈraspe]; born 8 March 1989) is a Spanish former professional footballer who played as a defensive midfielder.

He spent all but the final season of his career at Athletic Bilbao, appearing in 320 matches in all competitions after making his debut with the first team at the age of 19. In La Liga, he also played with Espanyol.

Iturraspe won two caps for Spain, in 2014.

== Club career ==
=== Athletic Bilbao ===
Born in Abadiño, Biscay, Iturraspe joined Athletic Bilbao in 1999, at the age of 10; he returned to his hometown four years later due to homesickness, but went back to Lezama to complete his development shortly after. He spent several seasons in the various junior levels of the club and, in 2007, moved to farm team CD Basconia in the Tercera División.

On 12 March 2008, Iturraspe started for the first team in a 6–1 friendly win against Zalla UC. Towards the end of the league campaign, he also played in exhibition matches with Club Portugalete and Aviron Bayonnais FC.

On 23 June 2008, Iturraspe was officially promoted to the main squad, being issued with the squad number 26. He made his La Liga debut on 14 September, starting in a 0–0 draw at Málaga CF in the same match as another youth graduate, Mikel Balenziaga; his second appearance came as a substitute, in the 2–0 home victory over Real Valladolid.

Iturraspe made his second start for Athletic in a Copa del Rey match against Recreativo de Huelva, being replaced at half-time by Pablo Orbaiz. He continued appearing almost exclusively for the reserves until the end of the season, however.

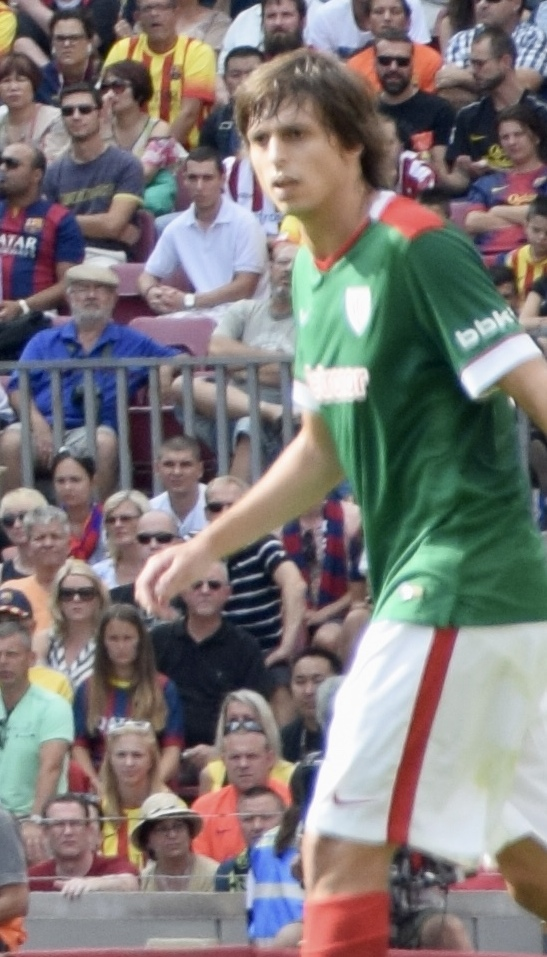
Iturraspe playing for Athletic at Camp Nou in Barcelona, 2014

Benefitting from physical problems to veteran Carlos Gurpegui, Iturraspe played 58 official games in 2011–12 under new manager Marcelo Bielsa; Athletic reached both the UEFA Europa League and the domestic cup finals. At the end of the 2013–14 season, he was voted into the La Liga Team of the Year by the reporters of the Liga Nacional de Fútbol Profesional.

In early 2019, it was announced that Iturraspe would leave the San Mamés Stadium at the end of the campaign when his contract ended. The club's final home match involved tributes to him, as well as fellow long-serving squad members Mikel Rico and Markel Susaeta who were also departing in similar circumstances.

=== Espanyol ===
On 8 July 2019, Iturraspe signed a one-year deal with RCD Espanyol as a free agent. He made his debut on 1 August in the second leg of the second qualifying round in the UEFA Europa League, as a 65th-minute substitute in a 3–1 win at Stjarnan (7–1 aggregate). Hampered by a shoulder injury, he did not feature for the Barcelona-based side until 15 December, again off the bench in a 2–2 home draw against Real Betis.

In September 2020, after his link expired and with his team having been relegated to Segunda División, Iturraspe decided to decline offers from other clubs and retire from playing, aged 31.

== International career ==
Following a strong 2013–14 season, Iturraspe was called up by Spain national team manager Vicente Del Bosque to his 30-man provisional squad for the 2014 FIFA World Cup, making his debut on 30 May in a friendly with Bolivia in Seville where he played the full 90 minutes (2–0 win). However, the following day, he was omitted from the final list.

== Personal life ==
Iturraspe's younger brother, Gorka, also came through Athletic's academy and became a professional in the same position.

== Career statistics ==
=== Club ===
Appearances and goals by club, season and competition
| Club | Season | League | | | Cup | | Europe | | Other | | Total | |
| Club | Season | Division | Apps | Goals | Apps | Goals | Apps | Goals | Apps | Goals | Apps | Goals |
|---|---|---|---|---|---|---|---|---|---|---|---|---|
| Basconia | 2007–08 | Tercera División | 30 | 1 | – | | – | | – | | 30 | 1 |
| Bilbao Athletic | 2007–08 | Segunda División B | 3 | 0 | – | | – | | – | | 3 | 0 |
| Bilbao Athletic | 2008–09 | Segunda División B | 26 | 1 | – | | – | | – | | 26 | 1 |
| Bilbao Athletic | 2009–10 | Segunda División B | 11 | 0 | – | | – | | – | | 11 | 0 |
| Bilbao Athletic | Total | | 40 | 1 | – | | – | | – | | 40 | 1 |
| Athletic Bilbao | 2008–09 | La Liga | 4 | 0 | 1 | 0 | – | | – | | 5 | 0 |
| Athletic Bilbao | 2009–10 | La Liga | 15 | 0 | 0 | 0 | 3 | 0 | 1 | 0 | 19 | 0 |
| Athletic Bilbao | 2010–11 | La Liga | 17 | 0 | 1 | 0 | – | | – | | 18 | 0 |
| Athletic Bilbao | 2011–12 | La Liga | 35 | 1 | 8 | 0 | 15 | 0 | – | | 58 | 1 |
| Athletic Bilbao | 2012–13 | La Liga | 30 | 0 | 2 | 0 | 9 | 0 | – | | 41 | 0 |
| Athletic Bilbao | 2013–14 | La Liga | 33 | 0 | 5 | 0 | 0 | 0 | – | | 38 | 0 |
| Athletic Bilbao | 2014–15 | La Liga | 25 | 2 | 6 | 0 | 7 | 0 | – | | 38 | 2 |
| Athletic Bilbao | 2015–16 | La Liga | 16 | 0 | 4 | 0 | 8 | 0 | – | | 28 | 0 |
| Athletic Bilbao | 2016–17 | La Liga | 24 | 0 | 3 | 0 | 5 | 0 | – | | 32 | 0 |
| Athletic Bilbao | 2017–18 | La Liga | 30 | 0 | 1 | 0 | 7 | 0 | – | | 38 | 0 |
| Athletic Bilbao | 2018–19 | La Liga | 3 | 0 | 2 | 0 | – | | – | | 5 | 0 |
| Athletic Bilbao | Total | | 232 | 3 | 33 | 0 | 54 | 0 | 1 | 0 | 320 | 3 |
| Espanyol | 2019–20 | La Liga | 8 | 0 | 3 | 0 | 7 | 0 | – | | 18 | 0 |
| Career total | | | 310 | 5 | 36 | 0 | 61 | 0 | 1 | 0 | 408 | 5 |

=== International ===
Appearances and goals by national team and year
| National team | Year | Apps | Goals |
|---|---|---|---|
| Spain | 2014 | 2 | 0 |
| Total | | 2 | 0 |

== Honours ==
Athletic Bilbao

- Copa del Rey runner-up: 2008–09, 2011–12, 2014–15
- UEFA Europa League runner-up: 2011–12

Individual

- La Liga Team of the Year: 2013–14
