= 2009–10 Athletic Bilbao season =

Athletic Bilbao
2009–10 season
- President: Fernando García Macua
- Head coach: Joaquín Caparrós
- Stadium: San Mamés
- La Liga: 8th
- Copa del Rey: Round of 32
- UEFA Europa League: Round of 32
- Supercopa de España: Runners-up
- Top goalscorer: League: Fernando Llorente (14 goals); All: Fernando Llorente (23 goals)

The 2009–10 season was the 109th season in Athletic Bilbao's history and their 79th consecutive season in La Liga, the top division of Spanish football.

== Squad statistics ==
=== Appearances and goals ===
No.	Pos	Nat	Player	Total		La Liga		Copa del Rey		Europa League		Supercopa	
No.	Pos	Nat	Player	Apps	Goals	Apps	Goals	Apps	Goals	Apps	Goals	Apps	Goals
1	GK	(Spain) ESP	Gorka Iraizoz	51	0	37	0	0	0	12	0	2	0
2	FW	(Spain) ESP	Gaizka Toquero	44	8	26+5	8	1+1	0	6+3	0	0+2	0
3	DF	(Spain) ESP	Koikili Lertxundi	26	0	20+1	0	2	0	0+1	0	2	0
4	DF	(Spain) ESP	Ustaritz Aldekoaotalora	21	1	15	1	1	0	3	0	2	0
5	DF	(Venezuela) VEN	Fernando Amorebieta	47	0	34	0	2	0	11	0	0	0
7	MF	(Spain) ESP	David López	25	0	7+10	0	1	0	1+5	0	1	0
8	MF	(Spain) ESP	Iñaki Muñoz	1	0	0+1	0	0	0	0	0	0	0
9	FW	(Spain) ESP	Fernando Llorente	51	23	35+2	14	2	1	11	8	1	0
10	MF	(Spain) ESP	Francisco Yeste	33	2	13+9	2	0	0	11	0	0	0
11	MF	(Spain) ESP	Igor Gabilondo	33	3	16+10	3	0+1	0	3+1	0	2	0
12	DF	(Spain) ESP	Mikel San José	30	3	24+1	1	0	0	4+1	2	0	0
13	GK	(Spain) ESP	Armando	3	0	1	0	2	0	0	0	0	0
14	MF	(Spain) ESP	Markel Susaeta	46	4	23+12	4	1	0	8+1	0	1	0
15	DF	(Spain) ESP	Andoni Iraola	52	2	37	2	2	0	11	0	2	0
16	MF	(Spain) ESP	Pablo Orbaiz	30	1	17+3	1	2	0	4+2	0	2	0
17	FW	(Spain) ESP	Joseba Etxeberria	18	2	2+5	0	1+1	0	3+4	2	1+1	0
18	MF	(Spain) ESP	Carlos Gurpegui	44	1	30+4	1	1	0	5+2	0	2	0
19	DF	(Spain) ESP	Iban Zubiaurre	1	0	0	0	0	0	0+1	0	0	0
20	DF	(Spain) ESP	Aitor Ocio	10	0	3	0	0	0	6	0	1	0
21	FW	(Spain) ESP	Ion Vélez	3	0	1+1	0	0	0	0	0	0+1	0
22	DF	(Spain) ESP	Xabier Castillo	33	0	18+1	0	0+2	0	11	0	0+1	0
23	FW	(Spain) ESP	Iñigo Díaz de Cerio	10	0	0+5	0	0+1	0	1+2	0	1	0
24	MF	(Spain) ESP	Javi Martínez	46	9	34	6	1	1	10+1	2	0	0
26	MF	(Spain) ESP	Ander Iturraspe	19	0	11+4	0	0	0	1+2	0	0+1	0
27	FW	(Spain) ESP	Iker Muniain	35	6	4+22	4	0	0	4+5	2	0	0
28	FW	(Spain) ESP	Óscar de Marcos	29	3	9+10	1	1	0	4+4	1	1	1
29	DF	(Spain) ESP	Eneko Bóveda	1	0	0+1	0	0	0	0	0	0	0
31	MF	(Spain) ESP	Adrien Goñi	0	0	0	0	0	0	0	0	0	0
35	DF	(Spain) ESP	Xabi Etxebarria	1	0	0	0	0	0	0	0	1	0
36	MF	(Spain) ESP	Isaac Aketxe	1	0	0+1	0	0	0	0	0	0	0
37	MF	(Spain) ESP	Iñigo Pérez	5	0	0+3	0	1	0	0+1	0	0	0
39	DF	(Spain) ESP	Jon Aurtenetxe	1	0	0	0	0	0	1	0	0	0
	DF	(Spain) ESP	Xabier Etxeita	5	0	1+2	0	1	0	1	0	0	0

== Competitions ==
=== La Liga ===
==== League table ====
Pos	Team	Pld	W	D	L	GF	GA	GD	Pts	Qualification or relegation
6	Getafe	38	17	7	14	58	48	+10	58	Qualification for the Europa League play-off round
7	Villarreal	38	16	8	14	58	57	+1	56 (Note: Mallorca could not qualify for the 2010–11 UEFA Europa League due to being immersed in a creditor contest, a situation against UEFA criteria. Then, Villarreal was invited to replace this spot.)	Qualification for the Europa League play-off round
8	Athletic Bilbao	38	15	9	14	50	53	−3	54	
9	Atlético Madrid	38	13	8	17	57	61	−4	47 (Note: DEP 2–1 ATM; ATM 3–0 DEP)	Qualification for the Europa League group stage (Note: Since Atlético Madrid won the 2009–10 UEFA Europa League they earned a spot in the group stage of the 2010–11 UEFA Europa League.)
10	Deportivo La Coruña	38	13	8	17	35	49	−14	47	

Source: LFP and Yahoo! Sport
Rules for classification: 1) points; 2) head-to-head points; 3) head-to-head goal difference; 4) head-to-head goals scored; 5) goal difference; 6) number of goals scored.

=== Supercopa de España ===
16 August 2009 1st leg	Athletic Bilbao	1–2	Barcelona	San Mamés, Bilbao
22:00 CET	De Marcos 44'	Report	Xavi 58'; Pedro 68'	Attendance: 35,000; Referee: Antonio Rubinos Pérez

23 August 2009 2nd leg	Barcelona	3–0 (5–1 agg.)	Athletic Bilbao	Camp Nou, Barcelona
22:00 CET	Messi 49', 67' (pen.); Bojan 72'	Report		Attendance: 61,083; Referee: Carlos Velasco Carballo

=== UEFA Europa League ===
==== Group stage ====
Pos	Team	Pld	W	D	L	GF	GA	GD	Pts	Qualification	BRM	ATH	NCL	AUS
1	(Germany) Werder Bremen	6	5	1	0	17	6	+11	16	Advance to knockout phase	—	3–1	4–1	2–0
2	(Spain) Athletic Bilbao	6	3	1	2	10	8	+2	10	Advance to knockout phase	0–3	—	2–1	3–0
3	(Portugal) Nacional	6	1	2	3	11	12	−1	5		2–3	1–1	—	5–1
4	Austria Wien	6	0	2	4	4	16	−12	2		2–2	0–3	1–1	—

Source: Soccerway

17 September 2009 1	Athletic Bilbao (Spain)	3–0	Austria Wien	San Mamés, Bilbao
21:05	Llorente 8' (pen.), 24'; Muniain 56'	Report		Attendance: 26,000; Referee: Kevin Blom (Netherlands)

1 October 2009 2	Werder Bremen (Germany)	3–1	(Spain) Athletic Bilbao	Weserstadion, Bremen
19:00	Hunt 18'; Naldo 41'; Frings 90+4' (pen.)	Report	Llorente 90+1'	Attendance: 24,305; Referee: Alexandru Tudor (Romania)

22 October 2009 3	Athletic Bilbao (Spain)	2–1	(Portugal) Nacional	San Mamés, Bilbao
19:00	Etxeberria 67'; Llorente 86'	Report	Micael 42'	Attendance: 24,569; Referee: István Vad (Hungary)

5 November 2009 4	Nacional (Portugal)	1–1	(Spain) Athletic Bilbao	Estádio da Madeira, Funchal
21:05	Edgar 64' (pen.)	Report	Etxeberria 85' (pen.)	Attendance: 2,945; Referee: William Collum (Scotland)

3 December 2009 5	Austria Wien	0–3	(Spain) Athletic Bilbao	Franz Horr Stadium, Vienna
19:00		Report	Llorente 19', 84'; San José 62'	Attendance: 11,500; Referee: Svein Oddvar Moen (Norway)

16 December 2009 6	Athletic Bilbao (Spain)	0–3	(Germany) Werder Bremen	San Mamés, Bilbao
21:05		Report	Pizarro 13'; Naldo 20'; Rosenberg 36'	Attendance: 27,500; Referee: Serge Gumienny (Belgium)

==== Knockout phase ====
===== Round of 32 =====
18 February 2010 1st leg	Athletic Bilbao (Spain)	1–1	(Belgium) Anderlecht	San Mamés, Bilbao
21:05	San José 58'	Report	Biglia 35'	Attendance: 39,000; Referee: Matteo Trefoloni (Italy)

25 February 2010 2nd leg	Anderlecht (Belgium)	4–0 (5–1 agg.)	(Spain) Athletic Bilbao	Constant Vanden Stock Stadium, Brussels
19:00	Lukaku 4'; San José 27' (o.g.); Juhász 49'; Legear 68'	Report		Attendance: 24,000; Referee: Thomas Einwaller (Austria)

== See also ==
- Athletic Bilbao in European football
