= 2010–11 Athletic Bilbao season =

Athletic Bilbao
2010–11 season
- President: Fernando García Macua
- Head coach: Joaquín Caparrós
- Stadium: San Mamés
- La Liga: 6th
- Copa del Rey: Round of 16
- Top goalscorer: Fernando Llorente (18 goals)
Home colours	Away colours	Third colours

The 2010–11 season was the 110th season in Athletic Bilbao's history and their 80th consecutive season in La Liga, the top division of Spanish football.

== Squad statistics ==
=== Appearances and goals ===
No.	Pos	Nat	Player	Total		Liga		Copa	
No.	Pos	Nat	Player	Apps	Goals	Apps	Goals	Apps	Goals
1	GK	(Spain) ESP	Gorka Iraizoz	41	0	37	0	4	0
15	DF	(Spain) ESP	Andoni Iraola	41	4	37	4	4	0
6	DF	(Spain) ESP	Mikel San José	34	2	31	2	3	0
5	DF	(Venezuela) VEN	Fernando Amorebieta	17	0	17	0	0	0
32	MF	(Spain) ESP	Borja Ekiza	21	0	21	0	0	0
24	DF	(Spain) ESP	Javi Martínez	38	4	35	4	3	0
18	MF	(Spain) ESP	Carlos Gurpegui	35	3	31	2	4	1
16	MF	(Spain) ESP	Pablo Orbaiz	29	2	26	1	3	1
9	FW	(Spain) ESP	Fernando Llorente	41	19	38	18	3	1
27	FW	(Spain) ESP	Iker Muniain	38	5	35	5	3	0
2	FW	(Spain) ESP	Gaizka Toquero	33	7	30	7	3	0
13	GK	(Spain) ESP	Raúl Fernández	1	0	1	0	0	0
11	MF	(Spain) ESP	Igor Gabilondo	33	6	29	5	4	1
7	MF	(Spain) ESP	David López	30	6	28	6	2	0
14	MF	(Spain) ESP	Markel Susaeta	31	1	28	1	3	0
8	MF	(Spain) ESP	Ander Iturraspe	18	0	17	0	1	0
3	DF	(Spain) ESP	Koikili Lertxundi	18	0	16	0	2	0
10	MF	(Spain) ESP	Óscar de Marcos	15	0	13	0	2	0
22	DF	(Spain) ESP	Xabier Castillo	12	0	11	0	1	0
4	DF	(Spain) ESP	Ustaritz Aldekoaotalora	14	0	10	0	4	0
29	DF	(Spain) ESP	Jon Aurtenetxe	12	0	10	0	2	0
26	DF	(Spain) ESP	Igor Martínez	10	0	8	0	2	0
21	FW	(Spain) ESP	Ion Vélez	5	0	5	0	0	0
33	FW	(Spain) ESP	Urko Vera	5	1	5	1	0	0
20	DF	(Spain) ESP	Aitor Ocio	5	0	4	0	1	0
17	MF	(Spain) ESP	Iñigo Pérez	4	1	3	1	1	0
28	MF	(Spain) ESP	Ibai Gómez	3	0	3	0	0	0
23	FW	(Spain) ESP	Iñigo Díaz de Cerio	2	0	2	0	0	0
19	DF	(Spain) ESP	Mikel Balenziaga	1	0	1	0	0	0

== Competitions ==
=== La Liga ===
==== League table ====
Pos	Team	Pld	W	D	L	GF	GA	GD	Pts	Qualification or relegation
4	Villarreal	38	18	8	12	54	44	+10	62	Qualification for the Champions League play-off round
5	Sevilla	38	17	7	14	62	61	+1	58 (Note: SEV: 7 pts; ATH: 6 pts; ATM: 4 pts)	Qualification for the Europa League play-off round
6	Athletic Bilbao	38	18	4	16	59	55	+4	58	Qualification for the Europa League play-off round
7	Atlético Madrid	38	17	7	14	62	53	+9	58	Qualification for the Europa League third qualifying round (Note: The 2010–11 Copa del Rey champions (Real Madrid) and runners-up (Barcelona) qualified for the 2011–12 UEFA Champions League, thus the 7th-placed team qualified for the 2011–12 UEFA Europa League.)
8	Espanyol	38	15	4	19	46	55	−9	49	

Source: LFP, sportec.es, Yahoo! Sport
Rules for classification: 1st points; 2nd head-to-head points; 3rd head-to-head goal difference; 4th head-to-head goals scored; 5th goal difference; 6th number of goals scored; 7th Fair-play points
