= 2012 Copa del Rey final =

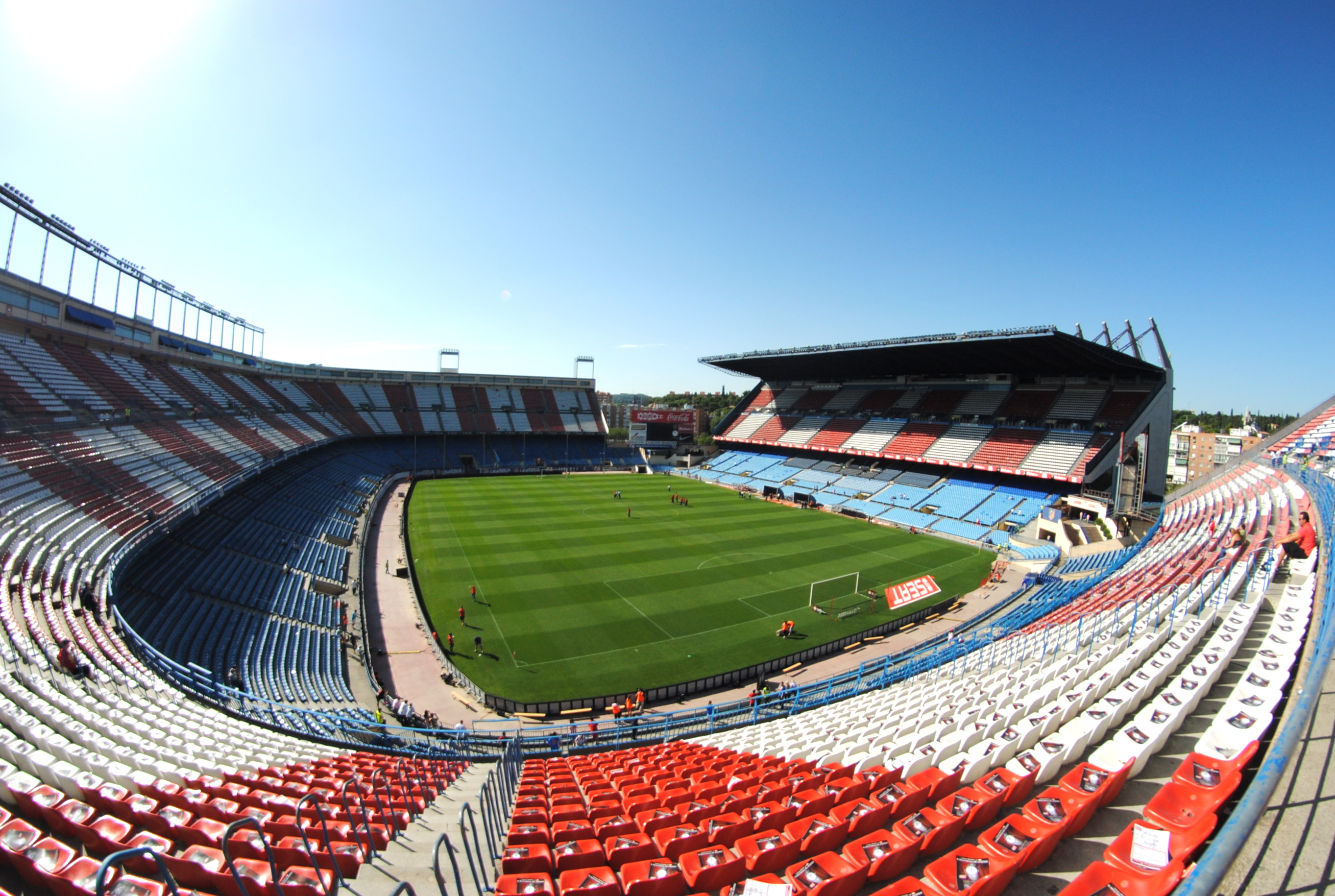
- Vicente Calderón Stadium in Madrid hosted the final
- Event: 2011–12 Copa del Rey
Barcelona	Athletic Bilbao
3	0
- Date: 25 May 2012
- Venue: Vicente Calderón, Madrid
- Man of the Match: Pedro (Barcelona)
- Referee: David Fernández Borbalán
- Attendance: 54,850
- Weather: Clear; 27 °C (81 °F)

The 2012 Copa del Rey final was the 110th final since the tournament's establishment (including two seasons where two rival editions were played). The match was contested by Athletic Bilbao and Barcelona on 25 May 2012 at the Vicente Calderón in Madrid. This was the clubs' first meeting in the final since 2009 where Barcelona won the trophy with a 4–1 victory. The same teams, the two with the most cup wins in the history of the competition, also met in the Round of 16 of the 2010–11 edition, in which Barça prevailed on away goals after two draws.

Barcelona lifted the trophy for the record-extending 26th time in their history with a 3–0 victory.

== Road to the final ==
Athletic Bilbao			Round	Barcelona
Opponent	Result	Legs		Opponent	Result	Legs
Real Oviedo	2–0	0–1 away; 1–0 home	Round of 32	L'Hospitalet	10–0	0–1 away; 9–0 home
Albacete	4–0	0–0 away; 4–0 home	Round of 16	Osasuna	6–1	4–0 home; 1–2 away
Mallorca	3–0	2–0 home; 0–1 away	Quarter-finals	Real Madrid	4–3	1–2 away; 2–2 home
Mirandés	8–3	1–2 away; 6–2 home	Semi-finals	Valencia	3–1	1–1 away; 2–0 home

== Match ==
25 May 2012
22:00 CEST

Athletic Bilbao	0–3	Barcelona
	Report	Pedro 3', 25'; Messi 20'

Vicente Calderón, Madrid
Attendance: 54,850
Referee: David Fernández Borbalán (Andalusia)

Athletic Bilbao	Barcelona

GK	1	(Spain) Gorka Iraizoz
RB	15	(Spain) Andoni Iraola (c)	(yellow card) 43'
CB	23	(Spain) Borja Ekiza
CB	5	(Venezuela) Fernando Amorebieta
LB	3	(Spain) Jon Aurtenetxe
CM	24	(Spain) Javi Martínez
CM	10	(Spain) Óscar de Marcos		(substituted off) 47'
RW	28	(Spain) Ibai Gómez
AM	19	(Spain) Iker Muniain
LW	14	(Spain) Markel Susaeta	(yellow card) 40'	(substituted off) 46'
CF	9	(Spain) Fernando Llorente		(substituted off) 73'
Substitutes:
GK	13	(Spain) Raúl Fernández
DF	6	(Spain) Mikel San José
MF	11	(Spain) Igor Gabilondo
MF	17	(Spain) Iñigo Pérez		(substituted on) 47'
MF	18	(Spain) Carlos Gurpegui
MF	21	(Spain) Ander Herrera		(substituted on) 46'
FW	2	(Spain) Gaizka Toquero		(substituted on) 73'
Manager:
(Argentina) Marcelo Bielsa

GK	13	(Spain) José Manuel Pinto
RB	35	(Spain) Martín Montoya
CB	3	(Spain) Gerard Piqué
CB	14	(Argentina) Javier Mascherano
LB	21	(Brazil) Adriano
DM	16	(Spain) Sergio Busquets
CM	6	(Spain) Xavi (c)	(yellow card) 66'	(substituted off) 81'
CM	8	(Spain) Andrés Iniesta	(yellow card) 71'
RF	17	(Spain) Pedro		(substituted off) 87'
CF	10	(Argentina) Lionel Messi
LF	9	(Chile) Alexis Sánchez		(substituted off) 72'
Substitutes:
GK	1	(Spain) Víctor Valdés
DF	32	(Spain) Marc Bartra
MF	4	(Spain) Cesc Fàbregas		(substituted on) 81'
MF	11	(Spain) Thiago		(substituted on) 87'
MF	15	(Mali) Seydou Keita		(substituted on) 72'
MF	20	(Netherlands) Ibrahim Afellay
FW	37	(Spain) Cristian Tello
Manager:
(Spain) Pep Guardiola

Assistant referees:
Raúl Cabañero Martinez (Murcia)
Jesús Calvo Guadamuro (Andalusia)
Fourth official:
Antonio Miguel Mateu Lahoz (Valencian Community)
Fifth official:
Roberto Alonso Fernández (Community of Madrid)

== See also ==
- Athletic–Barcelona clásico
