= 2014–15 Athletic Bilbao season =

Athletic Bilbao
2014–15 season
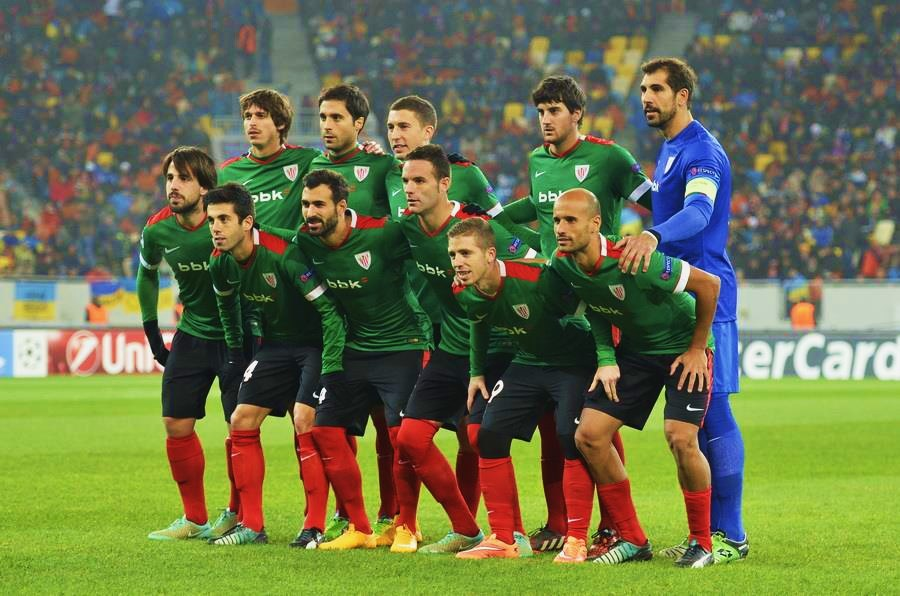
- Athletic's line-up for their UEFA Champions League group stage tie away to FC Shakhtar Donetsk, November 2014
- President: Josu Urrutia
- Head coach: Ernesto Valverde
- Stadium: San Mamés
- La Liga: 7th
- Copa del Rey: Runners-up
- UEFA Champions League: Group stage (3rd)
- UEFA Europa League: Round of 32
- Top goalscorer: League: Aritz Aduriz (18); All: Aritz Aduriz (26)
- Highest home attendance: 49,017 vs Napoli (27 August 2014)
- Lowest home attendance: 18,000 vs Alcoyano (18 December 2014) & vs Málaga (29 January 2015)
Home colours	Away colours

The 2014–15 season was the 116th season in Athletic Club’s history and the 84th in the top-tier. The campaign was notable for Athletic competing in the UEFA Champions League for the first time since 1998–99.

== Squad ==
As 2014..

=== Squad and statistics ===
The numbers and stats are established according to the official website:

As of 7 August 2015

No.	Pos.	Nat.	Name	League		Cup		Europe		Total		Discipline		
No.	Pos.	Nat.	Name	Apps	Goals	Apps	Goals	Apps	Goals	Apps	Goals	Yellow card	Yellow-red card	Red card
1	GK	(Spain)	Gorka Iraizoz	34	0	0(1)	0	8	0	42(1)	0	3		
2	FW	(Spain)	Gaizka Toquero	0(4)	0	0	0	0(1)	0	0(5)	0			
3	DF	(Spain)	Jon Aurtenetxe	3(1)	0	2	0	1	0	6(1)	0	1		
4	DF	(France)	Aymeric Laporte	33	0	6(1)	0	9	0	48(1)	0	15	1	
5	MF	(Spain)	Erik Morán	1(1)	0	1	0	0(1)	0	2(2)	0			
6	DF	(Spain)	Mikel San José	23(5)	5	6	1	7(2)	2	36(7)	8	13	1	
7	MF	(Spain)	Beñat Etxebarria	20(8)	2	5(2)	0	8(1)	0	33(11)	2	6		
8	MF	(Spain)	Ander Iturraspe	20(5)	2	3(3)	0	7	0	30(8)	2	6		
9	FW	(Spain)	Kike Sola	1(4)	0	0	0	0(1)	0	2(4)	0			
10	MF	(Spain)	Óscar de Marcos	32(3)	1	7	0	9(1)	1	48(4)	2	9		
11	FW	(Spain)	Ibai Gómez	9(12)	1	4(3)	0	4(2)	1	17(17)	2	2		
12	DF	(Spain)	Unai Bustinza	1(1)	0	1(1)	0	0	0	2(2)	0	2	1	
13	GK	(Spain)	Iago Herrerín	4	0	9	0	2	0	15	0	1		
14	MF	(Spain)	Markel Susaeta	20(11)	1	5(3)	1	6(3)	1	31(17)	3	3		
15	DF	(Spain)	Andoni Iraola (vc)	16(6)	1	6(1)	0	3(2)	1	25(9)	2	6		
16	DF	(Spain)	Xabier Etxeita	22(2)	2	6	1	4	0	32(2)	3	7		1
17	MF	(Spain)	Mikel Rico	32(4)	3	6(2)	0	10	0	48(6)	3	5		
18	MF	(Spain)	Carlos Gurpegui (c)	15(8)	1	5(1)	0	5(3)	1	25(12)	2	9		
19	FW	(Spain)	Iker Muniain	25	1	6(1)	0	7(2)	1	38(3)	2	8		
20	FW	(Spain)	Aritz Aduriz	30(1)	18	5(4)	5	6(2)	3	41(7)	26	14		
21	FW	(Spain)	Borja Viguera	10(10)	1	2(2)	2	2(2)	0	14(14)	3			
22	FW	(Spain)	Guillermo Fernández	5(9)	0	1	0	3(1)	1	9(10)	1	2		
23	MF	(Spain)	Ager Aketxe	3(5)	1	1(2)	0	0(1)	0	4(8)	1	1		
24	DF	(Spain)	Mikel Balenziaga	33	0	7	0	8	0	48	0	10		
29	MF	(Spain)	Unai López	15(4)	0	1	0	0(4)	0	16(8)	0	1		
30	FW	(Spain)	Iñaki Williams	15(4)	1	4	0	1(1)	1	20(5)	2	2		

=== From the youth system ===
Note: Flags indicate national team as defined under FIFA eligibility rules; some limited exceptions apply. Players may hold more than one non-FIFA nationality.

No.	Pos.	Nation	Player
12	DF	ESP	Unai Bustinza
22	FW	ESP	Guillermo Fernández
23	MF	ESP	Ager Aketxe
29	MF	ESP	Unai López
30	FW	ESP	Iñaki Williams

=== Transfers in ===
No.	Pos.	Nat.	Name	Age	EU	Moving from	Type	Transfer window	Ends	Transfer fee	Source
21	MF	(Spain)	Borja Viguera	39	EU	Alavés	Transfer	Summer	2017	€1,000,000	
3	DF	(Spain)	Jon Aurtenetxe	34	EU	Celta Vigo	Loan return	Summer	2017	Loan return	
–	GK	(Spain)	Raúl Fernández	38	EU	Numancia	Loan return	Summer		Loan return	
–	MF	(Spain)	Iñigo Ruiz de Galarreta	33	EU	Mirandés	Loan return	Summer	2016	Loan return	

Total spending: ▼€1,000,000

=== Transfers out ===
No.	Pos.	Nat.	Name	Age	EU	Moving to	Type	Transfer window	Transfer fee	Source
21	MF	(Spain)	Ander Herrera	37	EU	Manchester United (England)	Transfer	Summer	€36,000,000	
–	GK	(Spain)	Raúl Fernández	38	EU	Racing Santander	Mutual termination	Summer	Free	
3	MF	(Spain)	Iñigo Pérez	38	EU	Numancia	Mutual termination	Summer	Free	
–	MF	(Spain)	Iñigo Ruiz de Galarreta	33	EU	Zaragoza	On loan	Summer	Loan	
12	DF	(Spain)	Unai Albizua	37	EU	Tenerife	On loan	Summer	Loan	
22	DF	(Spain)	Enric Saborit	34	EU	Mallorca	On loan	Summer	Loan	
–	MF	(Spain)	Iker Guarrotxena	33	EU	Tenerife	On loan	Summer	Loan	
23	DF	(Spain)	Borja Ekiza	38	EU	Eibar	Mutual termination	Summer	Free	

Total revenue: ▲€36,000,000

== Pre-season and friendlies ==
12 July 2014 Friendly	Getxo XI	0–4	Athletic Bilbao	Getxo, Spain
19:00		Summary	Sola 25', 44'; Laporte 56'; Viguera 88'	Stadium: Fadura; Referee: (Spain) González Esteban

19 July 2014 Friendly	Al-Hilal	0–3	Athletic Bilbao	Wörgl, Austria
19:00		Summary	Beñat 3'; Aduriz 73', 75'	Stadium: Sportzentrum; Referee: (Austria) Georg Hofer

23 July 2014 Friendly	SC Paderborn	1–2	Athletic Bilbao	Wörgl, Austria
16:30	Koç 65'	Summary	Ibai 28'; Viguera 78'	Stadium: Sportzentrum; Referee: (Austria) Walter Altmann

27 July 2014 Friendly	Werder Bremen	2–2	Athletic Bilbao	Fügen, Austria
16:00	Prödl 29'; Bartels 49'	Summary	Aduriz 20'; Susaeta 42'	Stadium: Sportplatz; Referee: (Austria) Andreas Heiss

31 July 2014 Friendly	Benfica	0–2	Athletic Bilbao	Fribourg, Switzerland
19:30		Summary	Aduriz 39'; Beñat 71'	Stadium: BCF Arena; Referee: (Switzerland) Stephan Klossner

2 August 2014 Friendly	Toulouse	2–0	Athletic Bilbao	Bayonne, France
19:00	Sylla 37'; Regattin 65'	Summary		Stadium: Stade Didier-Deschamps; Referee: (France) Saïd Ennjimi

6 August 2014 Friendly	Osasuna	3–1	Athletic Bilbao	Pamplona, Spain
20:00	Flaño 17'; De las Cuevas 21'; Lotiès 33'	Summary	Ibai 85'	Stadium: El Sadar Stadium; Referee: (Spain) Ocón Arraiz

9 August 2014 Friendly	Borussia Mönchengladbach	1–3	Athletic Bilbao	Mönchengladbach
15:30	Hrgota 59'	Summary	Aduriz 14', 18', 24'	Stadium: Borussia-Park; Referee: (Germany) Sascha Stegemann

13 August 2014 Friendly	Olympiacos	0–0	Athletic Bilbao	Athens, Greece
20:30		Summary		Stadium: Karaiskakis Stadium; Referee: (Greece) Andreas Pappas

== Competitions ==
=== La Liga ===
==== League table ====
Pos	Team	Pld	W	D	L	GF	GA	GD	Pts	Qualification or relegation
5	Sevilla	38	23	7	8	71	45	+26	76	Qualification for the Champions League group stage (Note: Sevilla qualified for the Champions League group stage by winning the 2014–15 UEFA Europa League. As a result, the fifth-placed spot for the Europa League group stage they earned was vacated without replacement as per UEFA regulations.)
6	Villarreal	38	16	12	10	48	37	+11	60	Qualification for the Europa League group stage (Note: Since the winners of the 2014–15 Copa del Rey, Barcelona, qualified for European competition based on league position, the spot awarded to the cup winners (Europa League group stage) was passed to the sixth-placed team, and the spot awarded to the sixth-placed team (Europa League third qualifying round) was passed to the seventh-placed team.)
7	Athletic Bilbao	38	15	10	13	42	41	+1	55	Qualification for the Europa League third qualifying round
8	Celta Vigo	38	13	12	13	47	44	+3	51	
9	Málaga	38	14	8	16	42	48	−6	50	

Source: La Liga
Rules for classification: 1) points; 2) head-to-head points; 3) head-to-head goal difference; 4) goal difference; 5) number of goals scored; 6) fair-play points; 7) playoff match

==== Results by round ====
Round	1	2	3	4	5	6	7	8	9	10	11	12	13	14	15	16	17	18	19	20	21	22	23	24	25	26	27	28	29	30	31	32	33	34	35	36	37	38
Ground	A	H	A	H	A	H	A	H	A	H	A	H	A	H	A	H	A	H	A	H	A	H	A	H	A	H	A	H	A	H	A	H	A	H	A	H	A	H
Result	L	W	L	L	L	D	L	D	W	W	D	W	W	L	D	L	L	L	L	D	W	L	D	W	W	W	W	W	L	D	L	W	W	D	D	D	W	W
Position	15	7	12	15	18	16	19	17	15	11	11	9	9	10	10	12	12	13	13	13	11	13	13	12	10	8	8	8	9	9	9	8	8	8	7	8	7	7

A = Away; H = Home; W = Win; D = Draw; L = Loss

==== Matches ====
23 August 2014 1	Málaga	1–0	Athletic Bilbao	Málaga
19:00 CEST (UTC+02:00)	Luis Alberto 35'; Camacho (yellow card) 67'; Duda (red card) 88'; Samu (yellow card) 88'; Antunes (red card) 90+2'; Horta (yellow card) 90+4'	Report	Iraizoz (yellow card) 35'; Gurpegui (yellow card) 39'; Laporte (yellow card) 69'	Stadium: La Rosaleda; Attendance: 24,500; Referee: Antonio Mateu Lahoz (Valencian Community)

30 August 2014 2	Athletic Bilbao	3–0	Levante	Bilbao
19:00 CEST (UTC+02:00)	Aduriz 32'; Iturraspe 51'; Balenziaga (yellow card) 66'; Muniain 76'	Report	Simão Mate (yellow card) 23'; Barral (yellow card) 37'; López (yellow card) 50'; Vyntra (yellow card) 87'	Stadium: San Mamés; Attendance: 48,300; Referee: Pérez Montero (Andalusia)

13 September 2014 3	Barcelona	2–0	Athletic Bilbao	Barcelona
16:00 CEST (UTC+02:00)	Busquets (yellow card) 61'; Neymar 78', 83'	Report	Aduriz (yellow card) 29'	Stadium: Camp Nou; Attendance: 80,181; Referee: Fernández Borbalán (Andalusia)

20 September 2014 4	Athletic Bilbao	0–1	Granada	Bilbao
18:00 CEST (UTC+02:00)	Iraola (yellow card) 38'; Aduriz (yellow card) 86'	Report	Córdoba 39'; Nyom (yellow card) 48'; Rochina (yellow card) 55'; Foulquier (yellow card) 62'; Yuste (yellow card) 87'	Stadium: San Mamés; Attendance: 33,000; Referee: J. A. Teixeira Vitienes (Cantabria)

24 September 2014 5	Rayo Vallecano	2–1	Athletic Bilbao	Madrid
19:00 CEST (UTC+02:00)	Quini (yellow card) 18'; Baptistão 39', 89'; Trashorras (yellow card) 82'	Report	Aduriz 20'; Gurpegui (yellow card) 79'; De Marcos (yellow card) 84'	Stadium: Campo de Vallecas; Attendance: 11,040; Referee: Mario Melero López (Andalusia)

27 September 2014 6	Athletic Bilbao	0–0	Eibar	Bilbao
21:00 CEST (UTC+02:00)	Aduriz (yellow card) 4'; Iraola (yellow card) 41'; Balenziaga (yellow card) 56'; Rico (yellow card) 79'; Muniain (yellow card) 90+2'	Report	Bóveda (yellow card) 21'; Errasti (yellow card) 25'; Arruabarrena (yellow card) 38'; Capa (yellow card) 53'; Navas (yellow card) 53'; Ángel (yellow card) 90+2'	Stadium: San Mamés; Attendance: 45,000; Referee: Carlos Velasco Carballo (Madrid)

5 October 2014 7	Real Madrid	5–0	Athletic Bilbao	Madrid
20:00 CEST (UTC+02:00)	Ronaldo 2', 55', 88'; Ramos (yellow card) 28'; Benzema 41', 69'		De Marcos (yellow card) 25'; Balenziaga (yellow card) 34'	Stadium: Santiago Bernabéu

18 October 2014 8	Athletic Bilbao	1–1	Celta Vigo	Bilbao
18:00 CEST (UTC+02:00)	Aduriz 6' (pen.); Muniain (yellow card) 56'; Iraola (yellow card) 62'; Iturraspe (yellow card) 88'		Planas (yellow card) 65'; Nolito 73'; Charles (yellow card) 78'	Stadium: San Mamés; Attendance: 35,600

25 October 2014 9	Almería	0–1	Athletic Bilbao	Almería
16:00 CEST (UTC+02:00)	Thomas (yellow card) 13'; Verza (yellow card) 71'		Iraola (yellow card) 54'; Etxeita 56'	Stadium: Juegos Mediterráneos

2 November 2014 10	Athletic Bilbao	1–0	Sevilla	Bilbao
12:00	Aduriz (yellow card) 1', (goal) 13'; Iturraspe (yellow card) 23'; Etxeita (yellow card) 43'		Pareja (yellow card) 12'; Mbia (yellow card) 34'; Bacca (yellow card) 57'	Stadium: San Mamés; Attendance: 42,000

9 November 2014 11	Valencia	0–0	Athletic Bilbao	Valencia
19:00			Balenziaga (yellow card) 71'; Iturraspe (yellow card) 77'	Stadium: Mestalla; Attendance: 39,600

21 November 2014 12	Athletic Bilbao	3–1	Espanyol	Bilbao
20:45	Aduriz 29'; Viguera 44'; Iturraspe 78'	Summary	Vázquez (yellow card) 52'; Caicedo (yellow card) 61'; López (yellow card) 62'; García (yellow card) 75'; Sevilla (yellow card) 75'; Sánchez 84'	Stadium: San Mamés Stadium; Attendance: 28,000; Referee: Mario Melero López

29 November 2014 13	Getafe	1–2	Athletic Bilbao	Getafe
16:00	Michel (yellow card) 11'; Diawara (yellow card) 15'; Sarabia (yellow card) 20'; Naldo (yellow card) 57'; Velázquez (yellow card) 82'; Escudero (yellow card) 88'; Arroyo (yellow card) 89'; Lafita 90+1'	Summary	Muniain (yellow card) 18'; San José 36', (yellow card) 80'; Rico (yellow card) 40'; Balenziaga (yellow card) 51'; Laporte (yellow card) 70'; Beñat 90'	Stadium: Coliseum Alfonso Pérez; Attendance: 8,100; Referee: Alfonso Álvarez Izquierdo

6 December 2014 14	Athletic Bilbao	0–1	Córdoba	Bilbao
18:00 CET	Iturraspe (yellow card) 52'; Laporte (yellow card) 82'; Iraizoz (yellow card) 84'; Muniain (yellow card) 90+4'	Summary	Ghilas 23'; Luso (yellow card) 75'; Campabadal (yellow card) 81'; García (yellow card) 84'; Pinillos (yellow card) 88'; López Silva (yellow card) 90+1'; Juan Carlos (yellow card) 90+4'	Stadium: San Mamés; Attendance: 38,500; Referee: Santiago Jaime Latre

14 December 2014 15	Real Sociedad	1–1	Athletic Bilbao	San Sebastián
21:00 CET	Vela 3'	Report	San José (yellow card) 13'; Laporte (yellow card) 26' (yellow-red card) 80'; De Marcos 61'; Iturraspe (yellow card) 85'; Ibai (yellow card) 90+4'	Stadium: Anoeta; Attendance: 26,651; Referee: David Fernández Borbalán

21 December 2014 16	Athletic Bilbao	1–4	Atlético Madrid	Bilbao
21:00 CET	Rico 17'; Aduriz (yellow card) 25'; San José (yellow card) 52'; Muniain (yellow card) 68'	Report	Griezmann (yellow card) 28', (goal) 46', 73', 81'; García 53' (pen.); Giménez (yellow card) 74'; Turan (yellow card) 75'; Gabi (yellow card) 89'	Stadium: San Mamés; Attendance: 46,500; Referee: Alejandro Hernández Hernández

3 January 2015 17	Deportivo La Coruña	1–0	Athletic Bilbao	A Coruña
22:00 CET	Cavaleiro 24'; Domínguez (yellow card) 85'	Report	López (yellow card) 63'	Stadium: Estadio Riazor; Attendance: 16,200; Referee: Alberto Undiano Mallenco

11 January 2015 18	Athletic Bilbao	1–2	Elche	Bilbao
17:00 CET	Balenziaga (yellow card) 17'; San José 73'; Aduriz (yellow card) 80'	Report	Rodríguez 17', (yellow card) 72'; Lombán (yellow card) 44'; Fajr 53'; Aarón (yellow card) 55'; Suárez (yellow card) 64'; Cisma (yellow card) 80'; Adrián (yellow card) 89'	Stadium: San Mamés; Attendance: 42,000; Referee: Ignacio Iglesias Villanueva

17 January 2015 19	Villarreal	2–0	Athletic Bilbao	Villarreal
20:00 CET	Cheryshev 42', (yellow card) 77'; Bruno (yellow card) 56', (goal) 83' (pen.)	Report	Etxeita (yellow card) 54'; San José (yellow card) 76'	Stadium: El Madrigal; Attendance: 19,300; Referee: Xavier Estrada Fernández

25 January 2015 20	Athletic Bilbao	1–1	Málaga	Bilbao
17:00 CET	San José 70'	Report	Camacho (yellow card) 9'; Guerra 78'	Stadium: San Mamés; Attendance: 41,200; Referee: Alfonso Álvarez Izquierdo

1 February 2015 21	Levante	0–2	Athletic Bilbao	Valencia
11:00	Simão Mate (yellow card) 23'; Barral (yellow card) 62'	Report	Iraola (yellow card) 5'; Aduriz 48', 90', (yellow card) 87'; De Marcos (yellow card) 62'; Iturraspe (yellow card) 73'; Susaeta (yellow card) 83'	Stadium: Ciutat de València; Attendance: 16,359; Referee: Alejandro Hernández Hernández

8 February 2015 22	Athletic Bilbao	2–5	Barcelona	Bilbao
20:00	Balenziaga (yellow card) 40'; Rico 59'; Aduriz 66'; López (yellow card) 69'; Etxeita (red card) 75'; Gurpegui (yellow card) 90+1'	Report	Messi 15'; Suárez 26'; Alves (yellow card) 45'; De Marcos 62' (o.g.); Neymar 64'; Pedro 86'	Stadium: San Mamés; Attendance: 43,800; Referee: Antonio Mateu Lahoz

14 February 2015 23	Granada	0–0	Athletic Bilbao	Granada
19:00	Bangoura (yellow card) 25'; Insúa (red card) 68'; Rico (yellow card) 70'; Piti (yellow card) 84'; Córdoba (yellow card) 90'	Report	Muniain (yellow card) 28'; Gurpegui (yellow card) 41'; Aketxe (yellow card) 75'; Laporte (yellow card) 89'	Stadium: Los Cármenes; Attendance: 14,879; Referee: Carlos Clos Gómez

22 February 2015 24	Athletic Bilbao	1–0	Rayo Vallecano	Bilbao
16:00	San José (yellow card) 20'; Aduriz (yellow card) 78', (goal) 86'; Rico (yellow card) 83'	Report	Nacho (yellow card) 23'; Fatau (yellow card) 59'	Stadium: San Mamés; Attendance: 32,600; Referee: David Fernández Borbalán

1 March 2015 25	Eibar	0–1	Athletic Bilbao	Eibar
16:00	Navas (yellow card) 28'; Lillo (yellow card) 31'; García (yellow card) 60'	Report	Gurpegui 36'; San José (yellow card) 54'; Muniain (yellow card) 60'	Stadium: Ipurua; Attendance: 5,226; Referee: Fernando Teixeira Vitienes

7 March 2015 26	Athletic Bilbao	1–0	Real Madrid	Bilbao
17:00	Aduriz 26', (yellow card) 30'; Etxeita (yellow card) 38'; Gurpegui (yellow card) 78'	Report	Kroos (yellow card) 30'; Illaramendi (yellow card) 40'; Isco (yellow card) 74'; Marcelo (yellow card) 86'	Stadium: San Mamés; Attendance: 51,000

14 March 2015 27	Celta Vigo	1–2	Athletic Bilbao	Vigo
22:00	Fernández (yellow card) 16'; Krohn-Dehli (yellow card) 20'; Orellana (yellow card) 23'; Larrivey 64'	Report	Beñat (yellow card) 15'; Aduriz 17' (pen.); San José 32', (yellow card) 27' (yellow-red card) 85'; De Marcos (yellow card) 43'	Stadium: Balaídos; Referee: 17,000

21 March 2015 28	Athletic Bilbao	2–1	Almería	Bilbao
22:00	Etxeita 9'; Ibai (yellow card) 19'; Rico 26'; Laporte (yellow card) 85'	Summary	Dubarbier (yellow card) 13'; Balenziaga 47' (o.g.); Vélez (yellow card) 48' (yellow-red card) 90+1'; Soriano (yellow card) 80'; Hemed (yellow card) 90'; Thomas (yellow card) 90+3'	Stadium: San Mamés; Attendance: 36,500; Referee: Eduardo Prieto Iglesias

4 April 2015 29	Sevilla	2–0	Athletic Bilbao	Seville
16:00	Vidal 3'; Bacca 21'; Pareja (yellow card) 60'; Vitolo (yellow card) 67'; Banega (yellow card) 71'	Summary	Laporte (yellow card) 34'; Fernández (yellow card) 69'; Beñat (yellow card) 74'	Stadium: Ramón Sánchez Pizjuán Stadium; Attendance: 27,752; Referee: Alfonso Álvarez Izquierdo

9 April 2015 30	Athletic Bilbao	1–1	Valencia	Bilbao
20:00	Balenziaga (yellow card) 10'; Aduriz (yellow card) 32', (goal) 90'; Gurpegui (yellow card) 80'; Beñat (yellow card) 80'; Iraizoz (yellow card) 83'	Summary	Gomes (yellow card) 36'; De Paul 61'; Otamendi (red card) 82'; Alves (yellow card) 83'; Barragán (yellow card) 85'	Stadium: San Mamés; Attendance: 42,666; Referee: Fernando Teixeira Vitienes

12 April 2015 31	Espanyol	1–0	Athletic Bilbao	Cornellà de Llobregat
17:00	Stuani (yellow card) 33'; García 40'; Álvarez (yellow card) 88'	Summary	Laporte (yellow card) 38'; De Marcos (yellow card) 86'	Stadium: Cornellà-El Prat; Attendance: 20,143; Referee: David Fernández Borbalán

18 April 2015 32	Athletic Bilbao	4–0	Getafe	Bilbao
22:00	Etxeita (yellow card) 27'; Aduriz 45' (pen.), 46'; Beñat (yellow card) 52'; Ibai 79'; Susaeta 87'	Report	Castro (yellow card) 22'; Alexis (yellow card) 32'; Velázquez (red card) 44'; Pedro León (yellow card) 88'; Lago (yellow card) 90+2'	Stadium: San Mamés; Attendance: 40,000; Referee: Antonio Mateu Lahoz

24 April 2015 33	Córdoba	0–1	Athletic Bilbao	Córdoba, Andalusia
20:45	Andone (yellow card) 58'; Vico (yellow card) 81'	Report	Williams (yellow card) 3'; Etxeita (yellow card) 47'; Deivid 56' (o.g.); San José (yellow card) 85'	Stadium: Estadio Nuevo Arcángel; Attendance: 16,000; Referee: José Antonio Teixeira Vitienes

28 April 2015 34	Athletic Bilbao	1–1	Real Sociedad	Bilbao
22:00	Balenziaga (yellow card) 12'; Aduriz 52' (pen.); Laporte (yellow card) 79'	Report	González (red card) 50'; De la Bella (yellow card) 51', (goal) 60'; Pardo (yellow card) 85'	Stadium: San Mamés; Attendance: 42,322; Referee: Juan Martínez Munuera

2 May 2015 35	Atlético Madrid	0–0	Athletic Bilbao	Madrid
18:00	Torres (yellow card) 41'; Godín (yellow card) 86'	Report	San José (yellow card) 71'; Bustinza (yellow card) 76' (yellow-red card); Laporte (yellow card) 81'	Stadium: Vicente Calderón Stadium; Attendance: 53,500; Referee: Santiago Jaime Latre

9 May 2015 36	Athletic Bilbao	1–1	Deportivo La Coruña	Bilbao
22:00 CET	Aduriz 14', (yellow card) 40'; Laporte (yellow card) 48'; De Marcos (yellow card) 66'; San José (yellow card) 85'	Report	Postiga (yellow card) 78'; Lucas (yellow card) 84'; Borges (yellow card) 90'; Lopo 90+3', (yellow card) 90+4'	Stadium: San Mamés; Attendance: 39,670; Referee: Jesús Gil Manzano

17 May 2015 37	Elche	2–3	Athletic Bilbao	Elche
19:00 CET	Jonathas 32', 45', (yellow card) 62'; Cisma (yellow card) 88'		Aduriz (yellow card) 55'; Aketxe 80'; San José 87'; Gurpegui (yellow card) 89'; Williams 90+2'	Stadium: Martínez Valero; Referee: Alejandro Hernández Hernández

23 May 2015 38	Athletic Bilbao	4–0	Villarreal	Bilbao
18:30 CET	Aduriz 24' (pen.), 60'; Iraola 27'; Beñat 35'		Jokić (yellow card) 23'	Stadium: San Mamés; Referee: Eduardo Prieto Iglesias

=== Copa del Rey ===
==== Round of 32 ====
2 December 2014 First leg	Alcoyano	1–1	Athletic Bilbao	Alcoy
20:00 CET	Francis 32'	Report	Laporte (yellow card) 32'; Beñat (yellow card) 78'; Viguera 90+1'; Susaeta (yellow card) 90+3'	Stadium: El Collao; Attendance: 3,517; Referee: Eduardo Prieto Iglesias

18 December 2014 Second leg	Athletic Bilbao	1–0 (2–1 agg.)	Alcoyano	Bilbao
22:00 CET	Viguera 39'; De Marcos (yellow card) 61'; Aduriz (yellow card) 88'; San José (yellow card) 89'	Report	Fuentes (yellow card) 41'	Stadium: San Mamés; Attendance: 18,000; Referee: Carlos del Cerro Grande

==== Round of 16 ====
6 January 2015 First leg	Celta Vigo	2–4	Athletic Bilbao	Vigo
17:00 CET	López 11'; Costas (yellow card) 36' (yellow-red card) 71'; Charles 54', (yellow card) 82'; Cabral (yellow card) 86'	Report	San José 5', (yellow card) 77'; Aduriz 15', 87' (pen.); Rico (yellow card) 33'; Etxeita (yellow card) 39'; Muniain (yellow card) 66'	Stadium: Balaídos; Attendance: 14,929; Referee: Pedro Pérez Montero

14 January 2015 Second leg	Athletic Bilbao	0–2 (4 (a) –4 agg.)	Celta Vigo	Bilbao
20:00 CET	Beñat (yellow card) 38'; Rico (yellow card) 60'; Gurpegui (yellow card) 80'	Report	Samu (yellow card) 21'; Etxeita 48' (o.g.); Orellana 61' (pen.); Hernández (yellow card) 72'; Charles (yellow card) 75'	Stadium: San Mamés; Attendance: 25,000; Referee: Juan Martínez Munuera

==== Quarter-finals ====
21 January 2015 First leg	Málaga	0–0	Athletic Bilbao	Málaga
21:00 CET	Recio (yellow card) 62'; Weligton (yellow card) 81'	Report	Laporte (yellow card) 55'	Stadium: La Rosaleda; Attendance: 12,000; Referee: Eduardo Prieto Iglesias

29 January 2015 Second leg	Athletic Bilbao	1–0 (1–0 agg.)	Málaga	Bilbao
21:00 CET	Aduriz 48'; De Marcos (yellow card) 57'; Etxeita (yellow card) 74'; Laporte (yellow card) 90'	Report	Antunes (yellow card) 36'; Amrabat (yellow card) 38'; Recio (yellow card) 61'; Samu (yellow card) 88'; Camacho (yellow card) 90'; Duda (yellow card) 90+1'	Stadium: San Mamés; Attendance: 18,000; Referee: Carlos Velasco Carballo

==== Semi-finals ====
11 February 2015 First leg	Athletic Bilbao	1–1	Espanyol	Bilbao
21:00	Aduriz 11'; Gurpegui (yellow card) 41'; Aurtenetxe (yellow card) 77'; Herrerín (yellow card) 85'	Report	Sánchez 35'; Montañés (yellow card) 90+1'	Stadium: San Mamés; Attendance: 26,000; Referee: Carlos del Cerro Grande

4 March 2015 Second leg	Espanyol	0–2 (1–3 agg.)	Athletic Bilbao	Barcelona
22:00	Cañas (yellow card) 9'; Moreno (yellow card) 38'; Stuani (yellow card) 45'; Arbilla (yellow card) 67'; Álvaro (yellow card) 87'	Report	De Marcos (yellow card) 8'; Aduriz 13'; Etxeita 42'	Stadium: Power8 Stadium; Attendance: 34,831; Referee: Juan Martínez Munuera

==== Final ====
30 May 2015 Final	Athletic Bilbao	1–3	Barcelona	Barcelona
20:30	Iraola (yellow card) 43'; Balenziaga (yellow card) 58'; Williams (yellow card) 67', (goal) 79'; Iturraspe (yellow card) 87'	Report	Iraola (yellow card) 43'; Balenziaga (yellow card) 58'; Williams (yellow card) 67', (goal) 79'; Iturraspe (yellow card) 87'	Stadium: Camp Nou; Attendance: 97,000; Referee: Carlos Velasco Carballo

=== UEFA Champions League ===
==== Play-off round ====
19 August 2014 First leg	Napoli (Italy)	1–1	(Spain) Athletic Bilbao	Naples, Italy
20:45 CEST (UTC+02:00)	Jorginho (yellow card) 10'; Higuaín 68'	Report	Muniain 41'; Gurpegui (yellow card) 72'; Balenziaga (yellow card) 75'	Stadium: Stadio San Paolo; Attendance: 49,872; Referee: Jonas Eriksson (Sweden)

27 August 2014 Second leg	Athletic Bilbao (Spain)	3–1 (4–2 agg.)	(Italy) Napoli	Bilbao, Spain
	Susaeta (yellow card) 30'; Aduriz 61', 69'; Ibai 74'	Report	Ghoulam (yellow card) 39'; Higuaín (yellow card) 43'; Hamšík 47'	Stadium: San Mamés; Attendance: 49,017; Referee: Cüneyt Çakır (Turkey)

==== Group stage ====
Pos	Team	Pld	W	D	L	GF	GA	GD	Pts	Qualification	POR	SHK	ATH	BATE
1	(Portugal) Porto	6	4	2	0	16	4	+12	14	Advance to knockout phase	—	1–1	2–1	6–0
2	(Ukraine) Shakhtar Donetsk	6	2	3	1	15	4	+11	9	Advance to knockout phase	2–2	—	0–1	5–0
3	(Spain) Athletic Bilbao	6	2	1	3	5	6	−1	7	Transfer to Europa League	0–2	0–0	—	2–0
4	(Belarus) BATE Borisov	6	1	0	5	2	24	−22	3		0–3	0–7	2–1	—

Source: UEFA
Rules for classification: Group stage tiebreakers

17 September 2014 1	Athletic Bilbao (Spain)	0–0	(Ukraine) Shakhtar Donetsk	Bilbao, Spain
20:45 CEST (UTC+02:00)		Report		Stadium: San Mamés; Attendance: 48,351; Referee: Anastasios Sidiropoulos (Greece)

30 September 2014 2	BATE Borisov (Belarus)	2–1	(Spain) Athletic Bilbao	Barysaw, Belarus
20:45 CEST (UTC+02:00)	Palyakow 19'; Karnitsky 41'	Report	Aduriz 45'	Stadium: Borisov Arena; Attendance: 11,886; Referee: Stéphane Lannoy (France)

21 October 2014 3	Porto (Portugal)	2–1	(Spain) Athletic Bilbao	Porto, Portugal
20:45 CEST (UTC+02:00)	Herrera 45'; Quaresma 75'	Report	Fernández 58'	Stadium: Estádio do Dragão; Referee: Damir Skomina (Slovenia)

5 November 2014 4	Athletic Bilbao (Spain)	0–2	(Portugal) Porto	Bilbao, Spain
20:45 CET (UTC+01:00)		Report	Martínez 55'; Brahimi 74'	Stadium: San Mamés; Attendance: 47,243; Referee: Felix Brych (Germany)

25 November 2014 5	Shakhtar Donetsk (Ukraine)	0–1	(Spain) Athletic Bilbao	Lviv, Ukraine
20:45 CET (UTC+01:00)	Kucher (yellow card) 58'; Luiz Adriano (yellow card) 74'; Srna (yellow card) 85'; Stepaneko (yellow card) 89'	Report	Iturraspe (yellow card) 50'; Gurpegui (yellow card) 63'; Viguera (yellow card) 66'; San José 68'; López (yellow card) 90+2'	Stadium: Arena Lviv; Attendance: 33,489; Referee: (England) Mark Clattenburg

10 December 2014 6	Athletic Bilbao (Spain)	2–0	(Belarus) BATE Borisov	Bilbao, Spain
20:45 CET (UTC+01:00)	Iraola (yellow card) 23'; San José 47'; Susaeta 88'; Rico (yellow card) 90+3'	Report	Yablonskiy (yellow card) 22'	Stadium: San Mamés; Attendance: 42,852; Referee: (Italy) Daniele Orsato

=== UEFA Europa League ===
==== Round of 32 ====
19 February 2015 First Leg	Torino (Italy)	2–2	(Spain) Athletic Bilbao	Turin, Italy
19:00 CET (UTC+01:00)	López 18', 42'; Benassi (yellow card) 71'; Farnerud (yellow card) 90'; Darmian (yellow card) 90+4'	Report	Williams 9'; Gurpegui 73'; Beñat (yellow card) 76'	Stadium: Stadio Olimpico di Torino; Attendance: 25,725; Referee: Michael Koukoulakis (Greece)

26 February 2015 Second Leg	Athletic Bilbao (Spain)	2–3 (4–5 agg.)	(Italy) Torino	Bilbao, Spain
21:05 CET (UTC+01:00)	Etxeita (yellow card) 28'; Iraola 44'; Rico (yellow card) 45+2'; De Marcos 61'; Aduriz (yellow card) 70'	Report	Quagliarella 16' (pen.); López (yellow card) 39', (goal) 45+2'; Gazzi (yellow card) 48'; Darmian (yellow card) 53', (goal) 68'; Martínez (yellow card) 77'	Stadium: San Mamés; Attendance: 44,180; Referee: Liran Liany (Israel)

== See also ==
- Athletic Bilbao in European football
