= 2009 Supercopa de España =

Athletic Bilbao	Barcelona
1	5
- on aggregate

First leg
Athletic Bilbao	Barcelona
1	2
- Date: 16 August 2009
- Venue: San Mamés, Bilbao
- Referee: Antonio Rubinos Pérez
- Weather: Mostly cloudy 23 °C (73 °F)

Second leg
Barcelona	Athletic Bilbao
3	0
- Date: 23 August 2009
- Venue: Camp Nou, Barcelona
- Referee: Carlos Velasco Carballo
- Weather: Clear; 26 °C (79 °F)

The 2009 Supercopa de España was a two-legged Spanish football match-up played on 16 August and 23 August 2009. It was contested by Athletic Bilbao, the 2008–09 Copa del Rey runners-up, and Barcelona, the 2008–09 La Liga and 2008–09 Copa del Rey winners, making it a rematch of the 2009 Copa del Rey Final. Barcelona won 5–1 on aggregate for their record-tying eighth Supercopa de España title.

== Match details ==
=== First leg ===
16 August 2009
22:00 CET

Athletic Bilbao	1–2	Barcelona
De Marcos 44'	Report	Xavi 58'; Pedro 68'

San Mamés, Bilbao
Attendance: 35,000
Referee: Antonio Rubinos Pérez

Athletic Bilbao	Barcelona

GK	1	(Spain) Gorka Iraizoz
RB	15	(Spain) Andoni Iraola
CB	20	(Spain) Aitor Ocio
CB	4	(Spain) Ustaritz
LB	3	(Spain) Koikili	(yellow card) 79'
DM	16	(Spain) Pablo Orbaiz (c)
DM	18	(Spain) Carlos Gurpegui	(yellow card) 70'
RM	14	(Spain) Markel Susaeta
AM	28	(Spain) Óscar de Marcos		(substituted off) 59'
LM	11	(Spain) Igor Gabilondo		(substituted off) 67'
CF	9	(Spain) Fernando Llorente		(substituted off) 72'
Substitutes:
GK	13	(Spain) Armando
DF	5	(Venezuela) Fernando Amorebieta
DF	22	(Spain) Xabi Castillo		(substituted on) 67'
MF	26	(Spain) Ander Iturraspe
MF	10	(Spain) Francisco Yeste
FW	17	(Spain) Joseba Etxeberria		(substituted on) 72'
FW	2	(Spain) Gaizka Toquero		(substituted on) 59'
Manager:
(Spain) Joaquín Caparrós

GK	1	(Spain) Víctor Valdés
RB	2	(Brazil) Dani Alves	(yellow card) 90'
CB	3	(Spain) Gerard Piqué	(yellow card) 53'
CB	5	(Spain) Carles Puyol (c)
LB	22	(France) Eric Abidal
CM	24	(Ivory Coast) Yaya Touré
CM	15	(Mali) Seydou Keita
CM	6	(Spain) Xavi		(substituted off) 80'
RW	17	(Spain) Pedro
CF	14	(France) Thierry Henry		(substituted off) 72'
LW	11	(Spain) Bojan
Substitutes:
GK	13	(Spain) José Manuel Pinto
DF	32	(Spain) Andreu Fontàs
DF	33	(Spain) Marc Muniesa
DF	19	(Brazil) Maxwell
MF	16	(Spain) Sergio Busquets		(substituted on) 80'
MF	7	(Iceland) Eiður Guðjohnsen
FW	35	(Spain) Jeffrén		(substituted on) 72'
Manager:
(Spain) Pep Guardiola

Assistant referees:

- Juan Carlos Yuste Jiménez
- Marcos Álvarez Moreno

Fourth official:

- Luis Miguel Martínez Montoro

=== Second leg ===
23 August 2009
22:00 CET

Barcelona	3–0	Athletic Bilbao
Messi 49', 67' (pen.); Bojan 72'	Report

Camp Nou, Barcelona
Attendance: 61,083
Referee: Carlos Velasco Carballo

Barcelona	Athletic Bilbao

GK	1	(Spain) Víctor Valdés
RB	2	(Brazil) Dani Alves
CB	3	(Spain) Gerard Piqué		(substituted off) 75'
CB	5	(Spain) Carles Puyol (c)	(yellow card) 21'
LB	19	(Brazil) Maxwell
CM	24	(Ivory Coast) Yaya Touré	(yellow card) 33'
CM	15	(Mali) Seydou Keita
CM	6	(Spain) Xavi	(yellow card) 77'
RW	10	(Argentina) Lionel Messi
CF	9	(Sweden) Zlatan Ibrahimović		(substituted off) 70'
LW	14	(France) Thierry Henry		(substituted off) 75'
Substitutes:
GK	13	(Spain) José Manuel Pinto
DF	32	(Spain) Andreu Fontàs
DF	22	(France) Eric Abidal
MF	16	(Spain) Sergio Busquets		(substituted on) 75'
MF	7	(Iceland) Eiður Guðjohnsen
FW	11	(Spain) Bojan		(substituted on) 70'
FW	17	(Spain) Pedro		(substituted on) 75'
Manager:
(Spain) Pep Guardiola

GK	1	(Spain) Gorka Iraizoz
RB	15	(Spain) Andoni Iraola
CB	35	(Spain) Xabi Etxebarria	(yellow card) 16'
CB	4	(Spain) Ustaritz	(yellow card) 67'
LB	3	(Spain) Koikili
DM	16	(Spain) Pablo Orbaiz (c)
DM	18	(Spain) Carlos Gurpegui
RM	17	(Spain) Joseba Etxeberria		(substituted off) 55'
AM	7	(Spain) David López	(yellow card) 43'	(substituted off) 61'
LM	11	(Spain) Igor Gabilondo
CF	23	(Spain) Iñigo Díaz de Cerio		(substituted off) 45'
Substitutes:
GK	13	(Spain) Armando
DF	12	(Spain) Mikel San José
DF	22	(Spain) Xabi Castillo
MF	26	(Spain) Ander Iturraspe		(substituted on) 61'
FW	2	(Spain) Gaizka Toquero	(yellow card) 64'	(substituted on) 55'
FW	9	(Spain) Fernando Llorente
FW	21	(Spain) Ion Vélez		(substituted on) 45'
Manager:
(Spain) Joaquín Caparrós

Assistant referees:

- Roberto Alonso Fernández
- Enrique Andrés Samper

Fourth official:

- Valentín Pizarro Gómez

== See also ==
- Athletic–Barcelona clásico
- 2009–10 La Liga
- 2009–10 Copa del Rey
- 2009–10 Athletic Bilbao season
- 2009–10 FC Barcelona season
