= Óscar de Marcos =

Spanish footballer (born 1989)

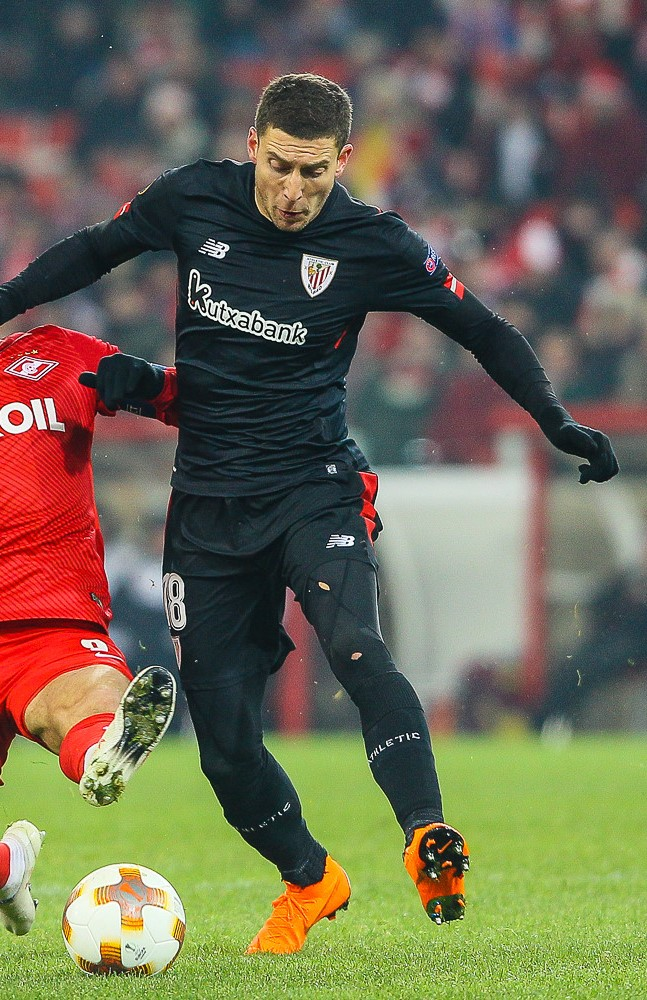
- De Marcos with Athletic Bilbao in 2018

Personal information
- Full name: Óscar de Marcos Arana
- Date of birth: 14 April 1989 (age 37)
- Place of birth: Laguardia, Spain
- Height: 1.82 m (6 ft 0 in)
- Positions: Full-back; midfielder

Youth career
- Alavés

Senior career*
| Years | Team | Apps | (Gls) |
| 2007–2009 | Alavés B | 16 | (4) |
| 2008–2009 | Alavés | 20 | (3) |
| 2009–2025 | Athletic Bilbao | 435 | (25) |
| 2010 | Bilbao Athletic | 1 | (0) |
| Total | | 472 | (32) |

International career
| 2009 | Spain U20 | 3 | (0) |
| 2009 | Spain U21 | 1 | (0) |
| 2012 | Spain U23 | 1 | (0) |
| 2013 | Basque Country | 1 | (0) |
- * Club domestic league appearances and goals

Óscar de Marcos Arana (Basque: [os̺kar de maɾkos̺ aɾana]; Spanish: [ˈoskaɾ ðe ˈmaɾkos aˈɾana]; (Note: In isolation, De Marcos is pronounced [de ˈmaɾkos].) born 14 April 1989) is a Spanish former professional footballer who played mainly as a full-back.

He began his career at Alavés but went on to spend most of it at Athletic Bilbao, making 573 official appearances (setting the club record for an outfield player) and winning the 2023–24 Copa del Rey as well as two Supercopa de España titles.

== Club career ==
=== Alavés ===
Born in Laguardia, Álava, de Marcos made his professional debut for nearby Alavés. He first appeared in the Segunda División in the home fixture against Tenerife on 21 December 2008, coming on as a late substitute in a 2–1 loss.

De Marcos eventually played 20 games with the first team, as they dropped down a level at the season's end. He started his career as a forward.

=== Athletic Bilbao ===
==== 2010s ====
In July 2009, de Marcos went straight into La Liga, penning a four-year deal with Athletic Bilbao for about €350,000. He made his club debut on 6 August in a 2–1 win at Young Boys in the UEFA Europa League (2–2 aggregate, victory on the away goals rule), as a starter. Ten days later, he opened the scoring against Barcelona in the season's Supercopa de España, as the Basques eventually lost 2–1 at home and 5–1 on aggregate.

Having been signed initially for the reserve squad, de Marcos had more impact than expected – as did 16-year-old Iker Muniain – making 29 official appearances during 2009–10 and scoring three goals. He played his only match with the B team on 14 April 2010 against Zamora, in a campaign where they narrowly avoided relegation from Segunda División B.

De Marcos appeared less in his second season, but was also used as a full-back by manager Joaquín Caparrós, finishing the year with 15 games in all competitions. The following campaign, under Marcelo Bielsa, he played in that position and also in central midfield.

On 17 December 2011, de Marcos played roughly one hour of the league fixture against Real Zaragoza (2–1 home win) with a tear in his scrotum, which later required 25 stitches. On 4 January of the following year he extended his contract with the Lions until June 2016, with a release clause of €32 million.

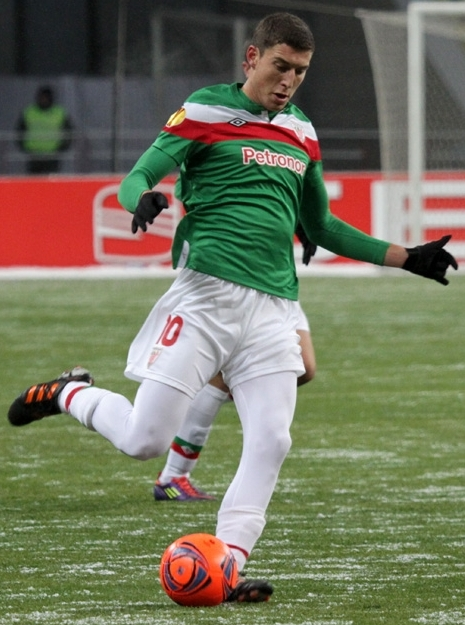
De Marcos playing in a Europa League match in 2012

De Marcos scored both legs of the 2011–12 Europa League round of 16 against Manchester United, as Athletic won both games and went through 5–3 on aggregate. He also scored in the next round against Schalke 04, playing in a total of 15 ties to help his team reach the final in Bucharest, where they were defeated by Atlético Madrid. They also made it to the decisive match in the domestic cup, losing to Barcelona.

On 13 October 2014, de Marcos agreed to a new three-year extension until 30 June 2019, with a buyout clause being set at €40 million. He also featured in all ten matches in both the UEFA Champions League and Europa League, but did not take part in the 2015 Spanish Cup final due to suspension (once again the result was a defeat to Barcelona, and his inexperienced replacement Unai Bustinza struggled to cope with the skill of Neymar); he did play the full 180 minutes of the 2015 Supercup, in which his club finally overcame the same opponent to claim the silverware.

Following the departure of veteran Andoni Iraola, de Marcos became the regular right-back in Ernesto Valverde's line-ups. In November 2016, he suffered an injury to his left foot which caused him to miss two months of action. On his first start since recovering on 22 January 2017, he scored in a 2–2 draw at home to Atlético Madrid, regaining a starting place for the remainder of the season. On 20 August he received another significant injury, a sprain to his left ankle in the opening fixture of the domestic campaign against Getafe; he returned three months later, starting in a 2–2 draw away to Deportivo La Coruña on 26 November although he lasted less than an hour before being substituted with an injury once more – this time a problem with his right foot.

De Marcos reached the milestone of ten years with the same club in July 2019. An injury to his left ankle ligaments forced him to miss much of 2019–20, but he was able to return after the delay caused by the COVID-19 pandemic in Spain.

==== 2020s ====
On 29 November 2020, de Marcos played his 400th match for Athletic as a substitute against Getafe, becoming the 19th player to reach that mark. The following 17 January, he equalised against Barcelona – seconds after Antoine Griezmann's opening goal – in a 3–2 win in the Spanish Supercup final. On 2 February he agreed an extension to his contract to run to the summer of 2022, with no buyout clause, doing likewise in April 2022. Having played over 40 times in the 2022–23 season, he signed a further year's contract in May 2023.

On the opening matchday of 2023–24, a 2–0 loss to Real Madrid at the San Mamés Stadium, de Marcos made his 500th appearance for Athletic, aged 34, becoming only the seventh player to do so. He was appointed captain at the end of that campaign with the departure of Muniain and, in October 2024, still the starting right-back, he passed the total of 541 matches by Txetxu Rojo (albeit with far fewer minutes overall) into third place in the rankings.

On 22 February 2025, de Marcos announced that he would retire at the end of the season. The following day, in a 7–1 home victory over Real Valladolid, he overtook Muniain to become the outfield player with the most appearances (561) in the club's history, behind goalkeeper José Ángel Iribar, and finished on 573 – 472 starts – in a home fixture against Barcelona which incorporated a farewell ceremony and the passing of the captain's armband to Iñaki Williams; the '18' squad number, only worn by Bittor Alkiza, Carlos Gurpegui and de Marcos in the previous three decades, was assigned to Mikel Jauregizar.

== International career ==
In November 2015, de Marcos and Nacho were called up into the Spain squad as replacements for the injured Sergio Ramos and Juanfran, ahead of friendlies against England and Belgium. De Marcos did not play either match, with the latter in Brussels being cancelled due to a terrorism-related lockdown.

De Marcos also featured for the unofficial Basque Country regional team.

== Personal life ==
Outside football, de Marcos is known for his humanitarian work, including non-publicised visits to see sick children in local hospitals on a weekly basis and frequent charity visits to Africa and South America, in addition to occasionally offering lifts in his car to supporters who attended training sessions at Lezama on foot.

In 2019, he authored a short book in collaboration with Athletic Bilbao's community foundation, describing the high and low points of his first year at the club which were followed by a trip to the West African country of Togo (the book's title) which helped him put his newfound fame as a sportsman in perspective.

He is red-green colour blind, which has occasionally caused him difficulty as a footballer required to make quick decisions based on visual information.

== Career statistics ==
Appearances and goals by club, season and competition
| Club | Season | League | | | Copa del Rey | | Europe | | Other | | Total | |
| Club | Season | Division | Apps | Goals | Apps | Goals | Apps | Goals | Apps | Goals | Apps | Goals |
|---|---|---|---|---|---|---|---|---|---|---|---|---|
| Alavés B | 2008–09 | Tercera División | 16 | 4 | – | | – | | – | | 16 | 4 |
| Alavés | 2008–09 | Segunda División | 20 | 3 | 0 | 0 | – | | – | | 20 | 3 |
| Bilbao Athletic | 2009–10 | Segunda División B | 1 | 0 | – | | – | | – | | 1 | 0 |
| Athletic Bilbao | 2009–10 | La Liga | 19 | 1 | 1 | 0 | 8 (Note: Appearances in UEFA Europa League) | 1 | 1 (Note: Appearances in Supercopa de España) | 1 | 29 | 3 |
| Athletic Bilbao | 2010–11 | La Liga | 13 | 0 | 2 | 0 | – | | – | | 15 | 0 |
| Athletic Bilbao | 2011–12 | La Liga | 34 | 4 | 8 | 1 | 14 | 4 | – | | 56 | 9 |
| Athletic Bilbao | 2012–13 | La Liga | 36 | 6 | 2 | 0 | 8 | 1 | – | | 46 | 7 |
| Athletic Bilbao | 2013–14 | La Liga | 35 | 5 | 4 | 0 | – | | – | | 39 | 5 |
| Athletic Bilbao | 2014–15 | La Liga | 35 | 1 | 7 | 0 | 10 (Note: Eight appearances in UEFA Champions League, two appearances and one goal in UEFA Europa League) | 1 | – | | 52 | 2 |
| Athletic Bilbao | 2015–16 | La Liga | 34 | 1 | 5 | 1 | 13 | 0 | 2 | 0 | 54 | 2 |
| Athletic Bilbao | 2016–17 | La Liga | 27 | 1 | 0 | 0 | 5 | 0 | – | | 32 | 1 |
| Athletic Bilbao | 2017–18 | La Liga | 21 | 1 | 0 | 0 | 7 | 1 | – | | 28 | 2 |
| Athletic Bilbao | 2018–19 | La Liga | 30 | 1 | 4 | 0 | – | | – | | 34 | 1 |
| Athletic Bilbao | 2019–20 | La Liga | 13 | 0 | 1 (Note: Appearance in 2020 Copa del Rey final (played in 2021)) | 0 | – | | – | | 14 | 0 |
| Athletic Bilbao | 2020–21 | La Liga | 25 | 1 | 4 | 0 | – | | 2 | 1 | 31 | 2 |
| Athletic Bilbao | 2021–22 | La Liga | 22 | 1 | 2 | 0 | – | | 2 | 0 | 26 | 1 |
| Athletic Bilbao | 2022–23 | La Liga | 37 | 1 | 6 | 1 | – | | – | | 43 | 2 |
| Athletic Bilbao | 2023–24 | La Liga | 28 | 1 | 5 | 0 | – | | – | | 33 | 1 |
| Athletic Bilbao | 2024–25 | La Liga | 26 | 0 | 2 | 1 | 12 | 0 | 1 | 0 | 41 | 1 |
| Athletic Bilbao | Total | | 435 | 25 | 53 | 4 | 77 | 8 | 8 | 2 | 573 | 39 |
| Career total | | | 472 | 32 | 53 | 4 | 77 | 8 | 8 | 2 | 610 | 46 |

== Honours ==
Athletic Bilbao

- Copa del Rey: 2023–24; runner-up: 2011–12, 2014–15, 2019–20, 2020–21
- Supercopa de España: 2015, 2021
- UEFA Europa League runner-up: 2011–12
