= Xabi Etxebarria =

Spanish footballer (born 1987)

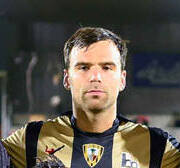
- Etxebarria with Barakaldo in 2017

Personal information
- Full name: Xabier Etxebarria Larrabide
- Date of birth: 20 July 1987 (age 39)
- Place of birth: Igorre, Spain
- Height: 1.81 m (5 ft 11 in)
- Position: Defender

Youth career
- 2004–2005: Arratia
- 2005–2006: Indartsu

Senior career*
Years	Team	Apps	(Gls)
2006–2008	Zamudio		
2008–2012	Bilbao Athletic	122	(5)
2008	Athletic Bilbao	1	(0)
2014–2015	Amorebieta	36	(4)
2015–2018	Barakaldo	64	(5)
2018–2022	Leioa	56	(1)
Total		279	(15)
- * Club domestic league appearances and goals

Xabier 'Xabi' Etxebarria Larrabide (born 20 July 1987) is a Spanish former professional footballer who played as a defender.

== Club career ==
Born in Igorre, Biscay, Etxebarria was signed by Athletic Bilbao from Tercera División side Zamudio SD in 2008, initially brought in to its reserve team. He made his first appearance for the main squad in a 5–0 friendly win against Aviron Bayonnais FC, on 3 September 2008. Three months later, in another exhibition game, he started and scored in the 7–2 victory over amateurs JD Somorrostro.

Etxebarria made his La Liga debut for Athletic on 7 December 2008, coming on as an 89th-minute substitute for David López in a 1–1 draw at Racing de Santander. He was released by the Lions in June 2012 after a further three full seasons with the B side in the Segunda División B and only one more competitive match with the first team, a 3–0 away loss against FC Barcelona in the 2009 edition of the Supercopa de España.

On 18 July 2014, after two years without a club, Etxebarria joined SD Amorebieta. He continued competing locally in the third tier in the following years, with Barakaldo CF (where he was used as a forward for a period due to an injury crisis) and SD Leioa; during his spell at the latter, he was sidelined for one year with an anterior cruciate ligament injury.

== Post-retirement ==
Etxebarria focused on his education after retiring, obtaining a degree in sports management and spending time in England, Chile and Germany.

== Personal life ==
Etxebarria's father, Francisco Javier Echevarría – who was referred to using the Spanish spelling of their surname rather than Basque – was also a footballer. He played as a goalkeeper in the top flight for RCD Espanyol and Real Murcia CF, as well as Sestao Sport (not to be confused with Javier Echevarría Iruarrizaga, who also featured for two of those teams in the same position some years later).
