= Koikili =

Spanish footballer (born 1980)

Personal information
- Full name: Koikili Lertxundi del Campo
- Date of birth: 23 December 1980 (age 45)
- Place of birth: Otxandio, Spain
- Height: 1.68 m (5 ft 6 in)
- Position: Left-back

Senior career*
Years	Team	Apps	(Gls)
1998–1999	Aurrerá	12	(0)
1999–2001	Osasuna B	37	(2)
2001–2003	Gernika	55	(0)
2003–2004	Beasain		
2004–2005	Gernika		
2005–2007	Sestao	64	(16)
2007–2012	Athletic Bilbao	82	(2)
2012–2014	Mirandés	52	(0)
- * Club domestic league appearances and goals

Koikili Lertxundi del Campo (born 23 December 1980), known simply as Koikili or Koi for short, is a Spanish former professional footballer who played as a left-back.

A late bloomer, he only became a professional at the age of 26 after signing with Athletic Bilbao. Over a five-year spell with the club, he appeared in 98 competitive matches.

== Club career ==
Koikili was born in Otxandio, Biscay, Basque Country. Playing Tercera División football just two seasons before moving to Athletic Bilbao, he was signed from Segunda División B side Sestao River Club for the start of 2007–08. He made his La Liga debut on 26 August, playing the full 90 minutes in a 0–0 home draw against Navarrese neighbours CA Osasuna, whose reserves he had already represented in the late 90s/early 2000s.

Koikili was first choice for much of the campaign, dislodging international Asier del Horno. On his 27th birthday, he scored his first top-flight goal in a 1–1 home draw against Real Murcia CF.

Koi appeared slightly less in the following two seasons for Athletic, but still totalled 52 official games (ten in the Copa del Rey, with the team reaching the final in the 2008–09 edition, and one in the newly created UEFA Europa League). On 11 January 2009, he netted the 1–1 at Atlético Madrid in an eventual 3–2 win.

Koikili was deemed surplus to requirements at Athletic in 2011–12 after the appointment of manager Marcelo Bielsa, alongside teammates Aitor Ocio and Iban Zubiaurre – he remained with the club, however. On 25 June 2014, he retired at age 33 after spending two Segunda División seasons at CD Mirandés.

== Personal life ==
Koikili was a Greco-Roman wrestler in his youth, once being crowned Spanish champion at under-15 level.

== Honours ==
Athletic Bilbao

- Copa del Rey runner-up: 2008–09
- Supercopa de España runner-up: 2009
