= Pedro (footballer, born 1987) =

Spanish footballer

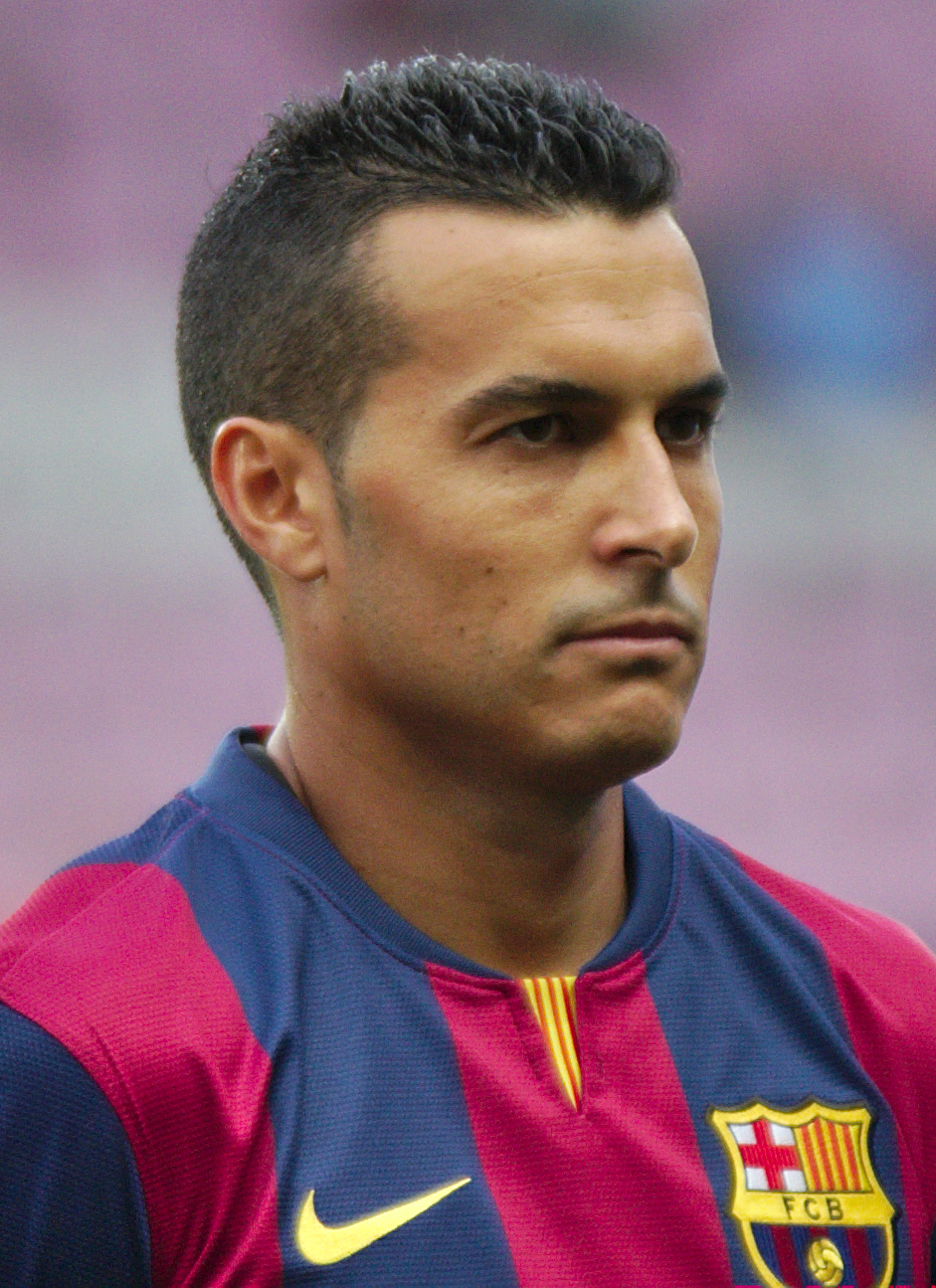
- Pedro lining up for Barcelona in 2014

Personal information
- Full name: Pedro Eliezer Rodríguez Ledesma
- Date of birth: 28 July 1987 (age 39)
- Place of birth: Santa Cruz de Tenerife, Spain
- Height: 1.69 m (5 ft 7 in)
- Position: Winger

Youth career
- 1995–2004: San Isidro
- 2004–2005: Barcelona

Senior career*
Years	Team	Apps	(Gls)
2003–2004	San Isidro		
2005–2007	Barcelona C	71	(11)
2007–2009	Barcelona B	51	(16)
2008–2015	Barcelona	204	(58)
2015–2020	Chelsea	137	(29)
2020–2021	Roma	27	(5)
2021–2026	Lazio	160	(29)
Total		650+	(148+)

International career
2008	Spain U21	2	(0)
2010–2017	Spain	65	(17)
Medal record
Men's football
Representing Spain
FIFA World Cup
Winner	2010 South Africa
UEFA European Championship
Winner	2012 Poland–Ukraine
FIFA Confederations Cup
Runner-up	2013 Brazil
- * Club domestic league appearances and goals

Pedro Eliezer Rodríguez Ledesma (born 28 July 1987), known as Pedro, is a Spanish former professional footballer who played as a winger.

Pedro scored 99 goals in 321 appearances across all competitions for Barcelona from 2008 to 2015, winning various honours including five La Liga and three UEFA Champions League titles; he scored in the 2011 final of the latter competition. During the 2009–10 season, he became the first player in history to score in every official club competition in a single season and in a single calendar year. Pedro joined Chelsea in 2015, where he scored 43 goals in 206 appearances and helped the club win the Premier League in 2017, the FA Cup in 2018, and the UEFA Europa League in 2019. He signed for Serie A club Roma in 2020 before moving to their city rivals Lazio the following year, where he remained until announcing his retirement in 2026.

Pedro represented Spain in two FIFA World Cups and two UEFA European Championships, winning the former competition in 2010 and the latter in 2012.

== Club career ==
=== Early career ===
Born in Santa Cruz de Tenerife, Tenerife, Pedro started his career at local club San Isidro. He scored 35 goals for their youth team in the 2003–04 season, and also played for the first team in the Tercera División. He was first noticed by Barcelona in 2003 while playing at a youth competition on his native island; the club had sent a scout to watch Spain youth international Jeffrén Suárez. In August 2004, Pedro joined Barcelona's youth team.

Pedro was a key player for Barcelona B as the team achieved promotion in the 2007–08 Tercera División, making 36 appearances and scoring six goals. On 12 January 2008, he made his debut for the first team, playing one minute in a 4–0 home win against Real Murcia in the 2007–08 La Liga, but would only amass four more minutes in his only two appearances combined.

=== Barcelona ===
==== 2008–2010: development and breakthrough ====
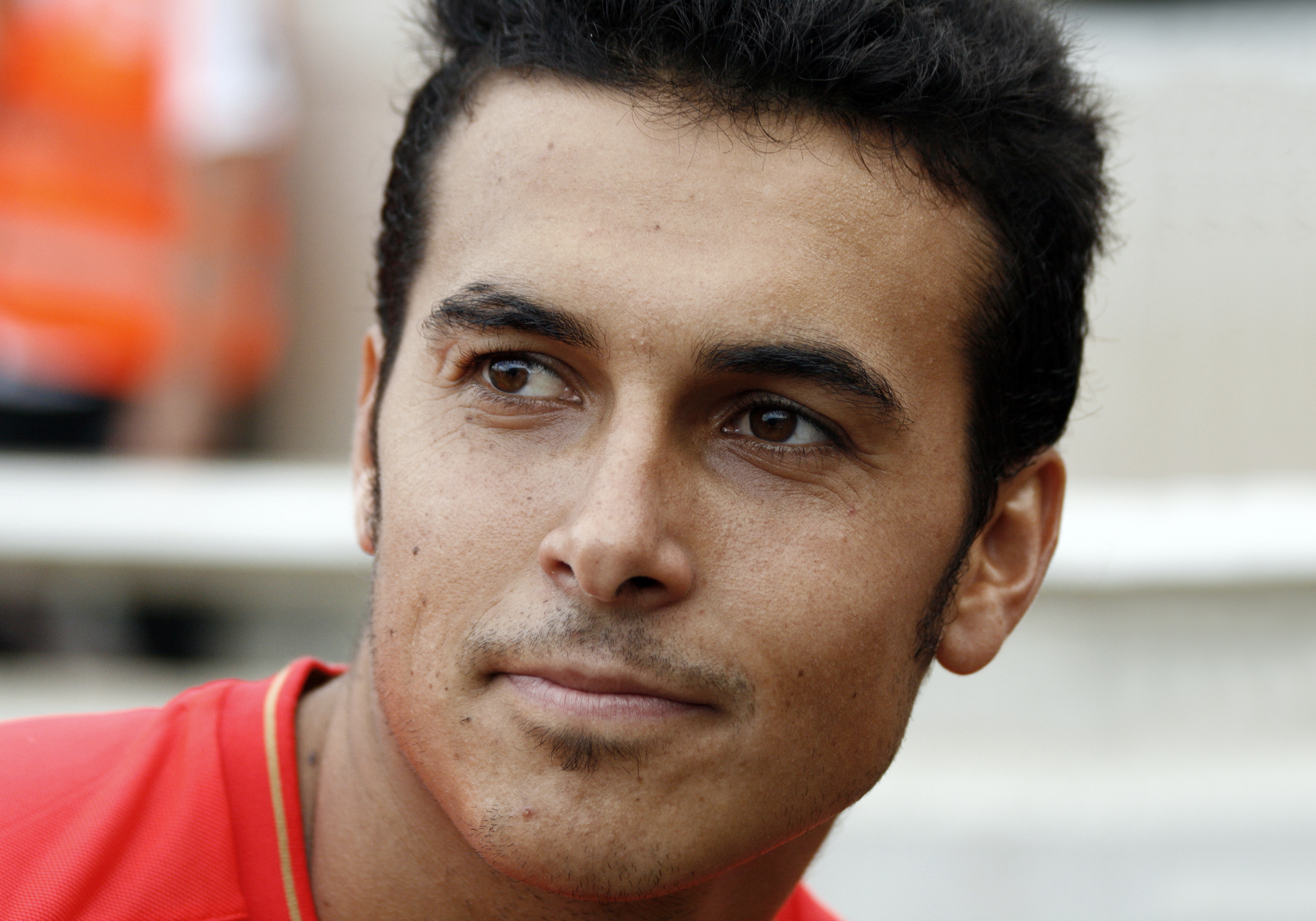
Pedro during training with Barcelona in 2008

Pedro was a part of the first team's 2008–09 pre-season, and showed early promise, scoring against Hibernian and the New York Red Bulls respectively. On 13 August 2008, he started in a 4–0 win against Wisła Kraków in the third qualifying round of the 2008–09 UEFA Champions League. His first appearance in the group stage of that competition came on 16 September, when he replaced Thierry Henry in a 3–1 home win over Sporting CP. In Barcelona's treble-winning season in 2008–09, Pedro made 14 appearances. In the Champions League final, he came on as a stoppage-time substitute in a 2–0 win against Manchester United at the Stadio Olimpico in Rome.

In the 2009–10 season, Pedro became the first player to score in every official club competition in a single season and also in a calendar year. On 16 August, after assisting Xavi with the first goal, he scored his first competitive goal for the first team in the 67th minute, helping to ensure a 2–1 victory over Athletic Bilbao in San Mamés for the 2009 Supercopa de España. Later that week, he signed his first professional contract with Barcelona. In the 2009 UEFA Super Cup against Shakhtar Donetsk, he came on as a substitute for Zlatan Ibrahimović in the 80th minute, and went on to score the only goal of the match in extra time. On 28 September, Pedro scored his first goal in the Champions League, after replacing Iniesta at half-time in a 2–0 win against Dynamo Kyiv.

On 16 December, Pedro scored a goal in the semi-final of the 2009 FIFA Club World Cup against Atlante, in a 3–1 win. In doing so, he became the first player ever to score in six different club competitions in a single season and in a single year – the three domestic competitions, the UEFA Champions League, UEFA Super Cup and the FIFA Club World Cup. Pedro scored for Barcelona in each of the last three league matches of the season, with the team eventually renewing their league supremacy: against Tenerife (4–1 win), the 3–2 winner at Sevilla and against Valladolid (4–0). He completed the 2009–10 season with 52 appearances in all competitions and 23 goals, and, on 9 June 2010, signed a new five-year contract with Barcelona.

==== 2010–11: UEFA Champions League and La Liga success ====
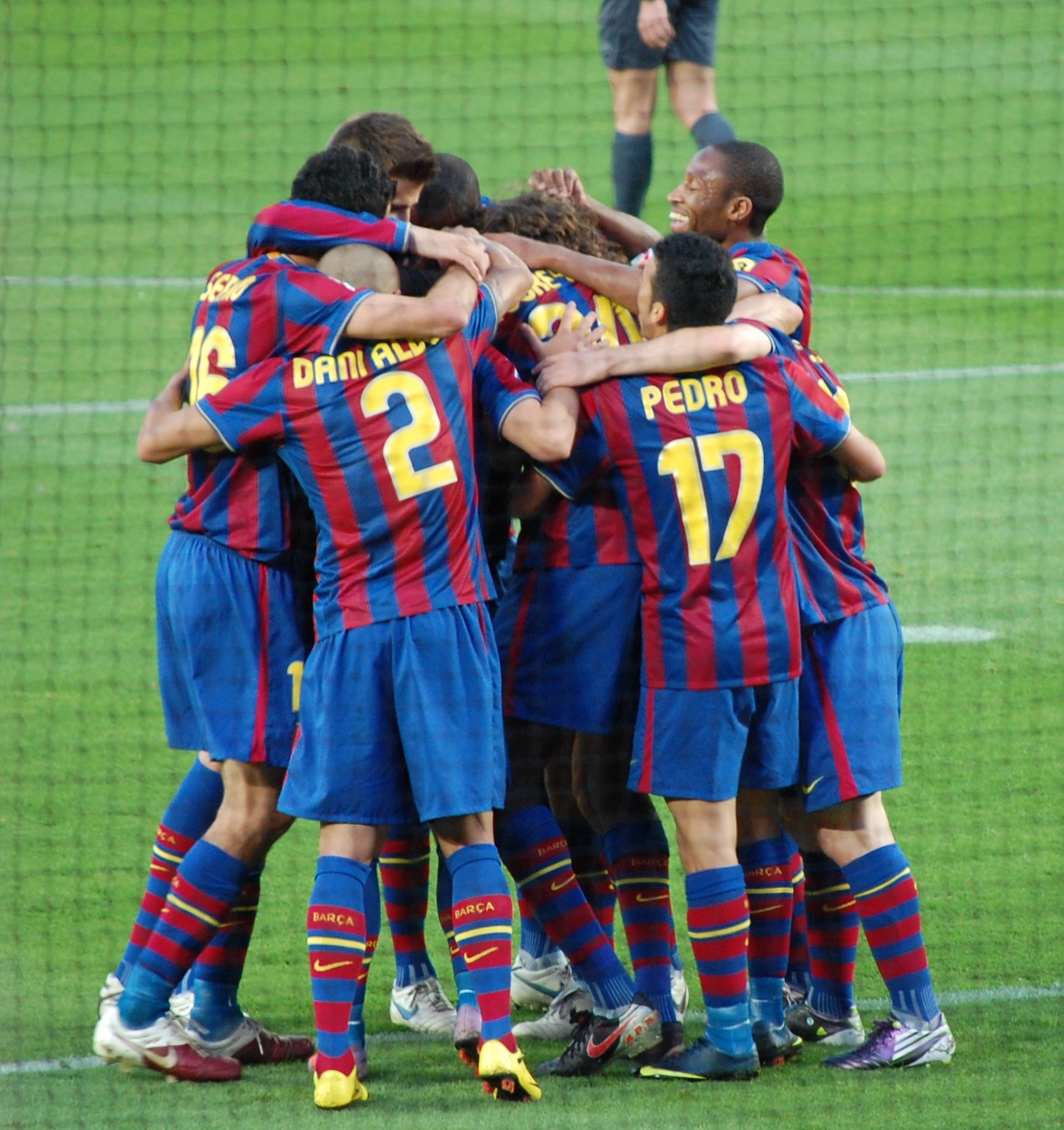
Pedro (wearing number 17) with Barcelona in 2010

Pedro began the 2010–11 season firmly established in Barcelona's starting line-up. On 29 November 2010, he scored the second goal in the a 5–0 home win against Real Madrid, with Barcelona climbing to the first place in the league as a result. The following month, he scored twice against Espanyol in the local derby, in a 5–1 away win.

On 20 April 2011, Pedro scored against Real Madrid in the second half of 2011 Copa del Rey final, but his goal was disallowed for offside, in an eventual 1–0 extra-time loss. On 3 May, against the same opponent, in the 2010–11 Champions League semi-final second leg, he found Iker Casillas' net in a 1–1 home draw (3–1 aggregate win). In the Champions League final, he opened the scoring against Manchester United, in a 3–1 win at Wembley Stadium in London.

==== 2011–2014: further La Liga and domestic success ====
On 5 July 2011, Pedro extended his contract by one year, until June 2016. His buyout clause was raised from €90 million to €150 million. After the signing of Alexis Sánchez, Pedro featured less during the 2011–12 season. However, he did finish the season with 13 goals, including two in that season's Copa del Rey final, a 3–0 win against Athletic Bilbao.

Pedro scored a hat-trick on 21 September 2013 in a 4–0 victory away to Rayo Vallecano. On 22 December, in another away fixture, he added another three – all in the first half and in only nine minutes – to help Barcelona come back from 2–0 down to win 5–2 over Getafe, thus becoming the player to score the fastest ever hat-trick in Barcelona history.

==== 2014–15: treble and final season ====
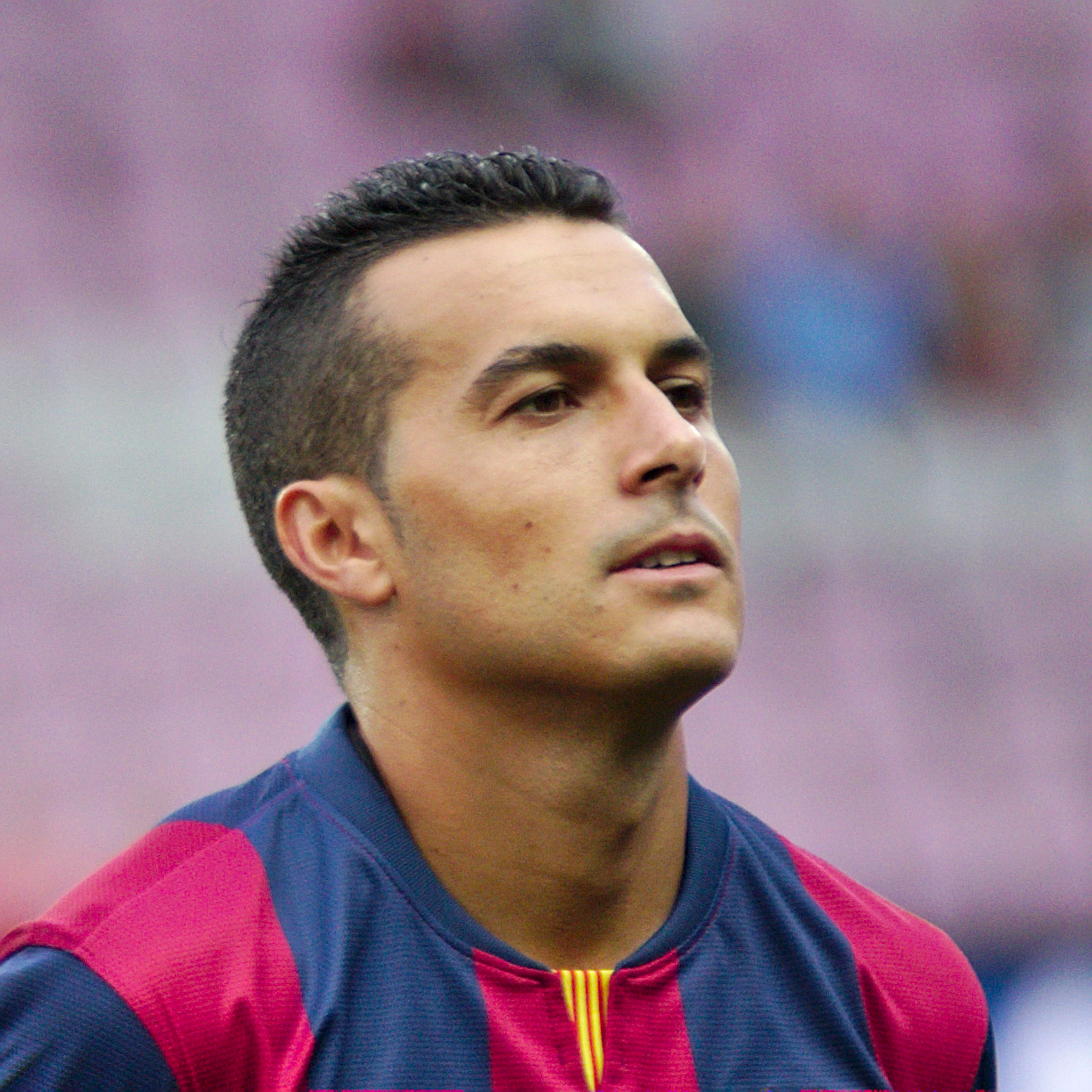
Pedro lining up for Barcelona in 2014

On 16 December 2014, Pedro scored another hat-trick, this time in a round of 32 second leg fixture in the Copa del Rey against Huesca, with Barcelona winning 8–1 at home. On 4 June 2015, Barcelona announced that Pedro had signed a new four-year contract, and that his buyout clause would remain at €150 million.

Pedro appeared as a stoppage-time substitute on 6 June 2015 in the Champions League final, as the club won its fifth title by beating Juventus 3–1 at Berlin's Olympiastadion. This made Barcelona the first club in history to win the treble of domestic league, domestic cup and European Cup twice. Pedro, Lionel Messi, Andrés Iniesta, Xavi, Gerard Piqué, Sergio Busquets and Dani Alves were the only players to have been a part of both treble-winning teams.

As an extra-time substitute, Pedro scored the winning goal as Barcelona won the 2015 UEFA Super Cup 5–4 against Sevilla on 11 August in Tbilisi.

=== Chelsea ===
==== 2015–2017: debut season and Premier League title ====
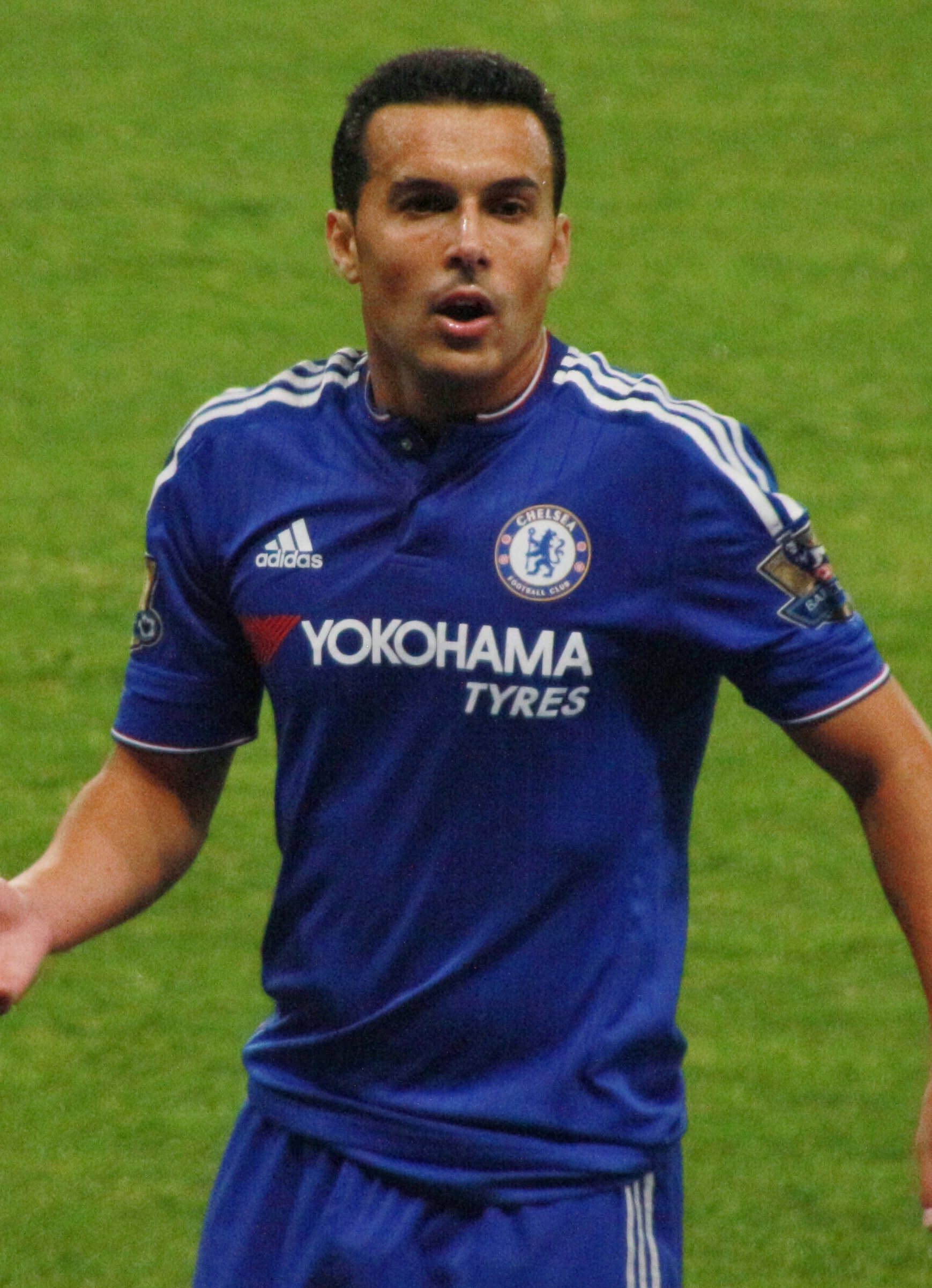
Pedro playing for Chelsea in 2015

On 20 August 2015, Pedro signed for Premier League champions Chelsea on a four-year contract for £19 million (€26.6 million), potentially rising to £21.4 million (€30 million) in add-ons. His first club, San Isidro, received €420,000 from the transfer. Three days after signing, he made his debut away to West Bromwich Albion, scoring the first goal and providing an assist for the second goal of a 3–2 win. On 19 December, Pedro scored the second goal in a 3–1 win against Sunderland, his first at Chelsea's home ground, Stamford Bridge. On 13 February, Pedro scored a brace in a 5–1 victory over Newcastle United, and again on 2 April in a 4–0 win over Aston Villa.

Pedro made his first start of the 2016–17 season on 20 August 2016 in an away match against Watford, after it was announced that Willian was out with an injury. On 23 October, Pedro scored the fastest goal of the season, which came in the first 30 seconds of a 4–0 home victory over Manchester United. He scored the equaliser for Chelsea shortly before half-time in a 2–1 victory over Tottenham Hotspur on 26 November. The goal was later named the Premier League Goal of the Month for November. On 30 April 2017, he scored with a 25 yard shot in a 3–0 away win over Everton, which later won the Premier League Goal of the Month award for April.

==== 2018–2020: UEFA Europa League win and final season ====
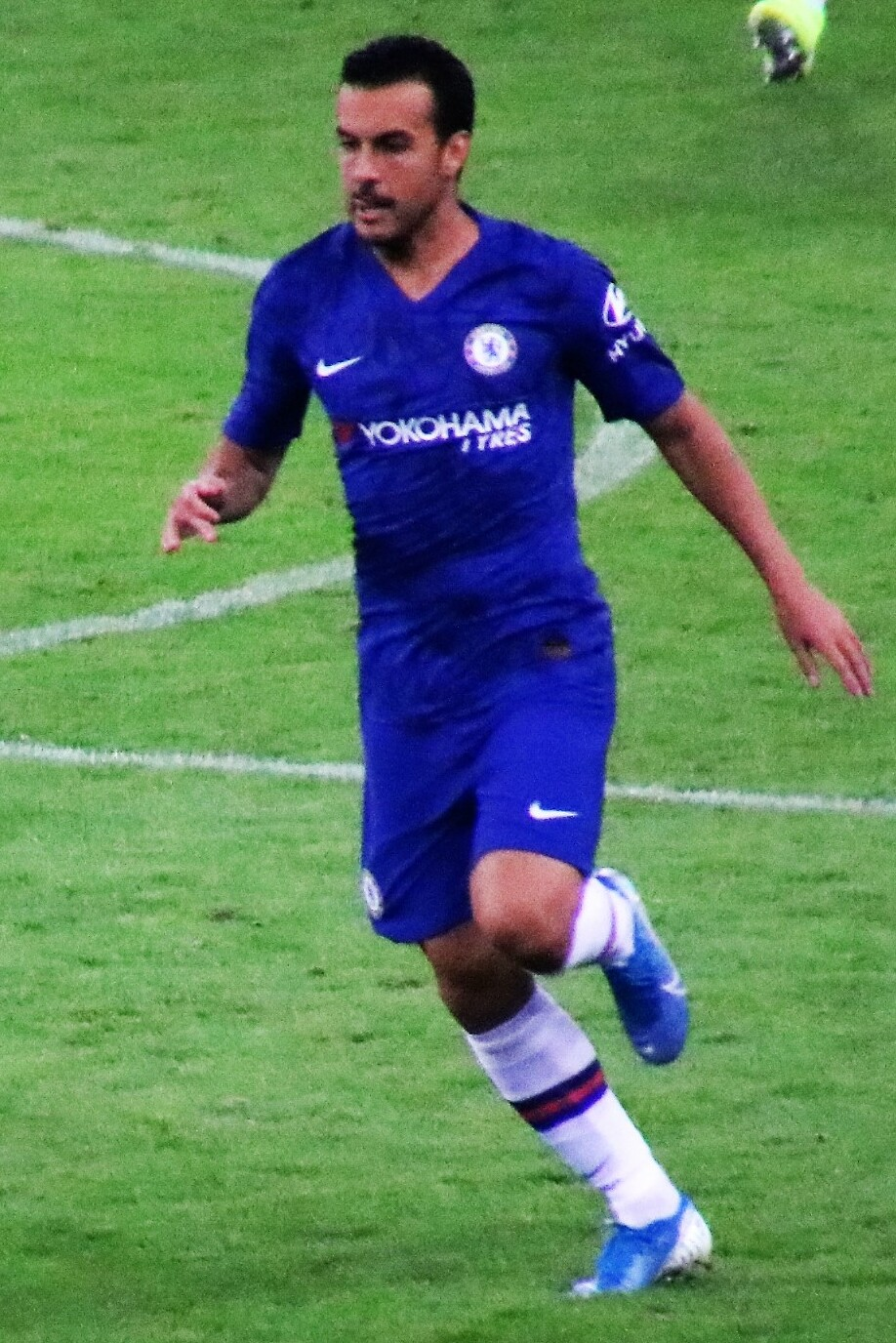
Pedro playing for Chelsea in 2019

On 11 August 2018, he scored his first league goal of the 2018–19 season in a 3–0 win away to Huddersfield Town. On his 150th Chelsea appearance, Pedro scored the club's 1,000th Premier League goal at Stamford Bridge, opening the scoring in a 2–0 win against Fulham. He scored two goals and had a hand in two more to help Chelsea through to the 2018–19 UEFA Europa League semi-final at the expense of Slavia Prague at Stamford Bridge on 18 April. Chelsea won 4–3 on the night and 5–3 on aggregate. On 29 May, Pedro scored in Chelsea's 4–1 win over Arsenal in the 2019 Europa League final; as a result, he became the fifth player to score in a European Cup/Champions League and UEFA Cup/Europa League final, after Allan Simonsen, Dmitri Alenichev, Hernán Crespo, and Steven Gerrard. His goal in the Europa League final meant that it was his ninth goal in a final in his career, putting him seventh in the all time list for top goal scorers in finals. He was included in the Europa League Team of the Season for the 2018–19 season.

Pedro scored his first league goal of the 2019–20 season on 8 March 2020 in a 4–0 home win over Everton. He had been scoreless in the Premier League for more than a year, with the previous goal dated back to 27 February 2019. On 26 July, Chelsea manager Frank Lampard confirmed that Pedro would leave the club at the end of the season.

=== Roma ===
On 25 August 2020, Serie A club Roma signed Pedro on a three-year contract. He made his debut on 19 September, in a 0–0 draw with Hellas Verona. He scored his first goal for Roma on 3 October in a 1–0 victory over Udinese. After a strong start, his performances worsened due to several injuries and a conflict with manager Paulo Fonseca. Nevertheless, he scored in a 2–0 win in the Derby della Capitale against Lazio on 15 May 2021 in the final match of the season.

=== Lazio ===
On 19 August 2021, Pedro joined Roma's Derby della Capitale rivals Lazio on a two-year contract having been omitted from new Roma manager José Mourinho's squad for their pre-season fixtures. He became the first player since goalkeeper Astutillo Malgioglio in 1985 to move directly between the two clubs. On 21 August, he made his debut in a 3–1 win against Empoli, and scored his first goal against Roma on 26 September, becoming only the third player to score for both clubs in the Derby della Capitale. On 7 March 2023, he scored a goal in a 2–1 defeat against AZ Alkmaar in the Conference League round of 16, to become the first player to score in the knockout stages of all three existing European competitions.

On 25 July 2023, he extended his contract with Lazio for the 2023–24 season. On 4 October 2023, he scored his first Champions League goal with Lazio in the 6th and final minute of stoppage time in a 2–1 away win over Celtic.

Finished the 2024–25 season as the club's joint top-scorer across all competitions with 14 goals alongside Valentín Castellanos and extended his contract for one more year. On 7 January 2026, he scored from a penalty in the stoppage time of a 2–2 draw with Fiorentina, becoming the oldest goalscorer for the club, aged 38 years and 163 days, surpassing the previous record of Miroslav Klose. Later that year, on 21 May, he announced his departure from the club by the end of the 2025–26 season. Two days later, he scored a goal in a 2–1 victory over Pisa in his final match with the club. Finished the season as club's joint top-scorer across all competitions for a second year in a row.

On 7 October 2026, Pedro announced his retirement from football, and his former club Barcelona will honour him with a farewell event.

== International career ==
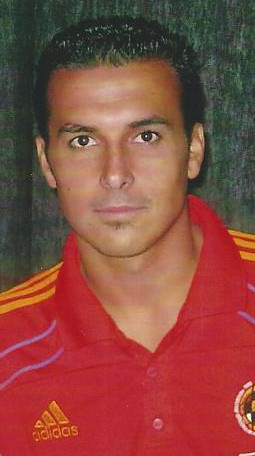
Pedro with Spain in 2010

Pedro was included by in Spain's 23-man squad for the 2010 FIFA World Cup in South Africa. Nine days later, he made his debut in a 3–2 friendly win against Saudi Arabia, replacing David Silva for the final 30 minutes. On 8 June, in the last friendly prior to the start of the World Cup, Pedro scored his first international goal, in a 6–0 victory over Poland in Murcia's Estadio Nueva Condomina.

Pedro appeared in five matches at the World Cup, three of which came as a late substitute. On 7 July 2010, in the semi-final against Germany, he started in place of Fernando Torres, who had been performing poorly in earlier matches. In the 82nd minute, with Spain leading 1–0, Pedro attempted to score a goal himself rather than set up an unmarked Torres, although he performed well in the match. Pedro started in the final at Soccer City in Johannesburg on 11 July, with Spain beating the Netherlands 1–0 after extra time to win the World Cup for the first time.

Pedro was part of the Spain squad for UEFA Euro 2012 in Poland and Ukraine, which they entered as defending champions. He did not appear in any of their matches in the group stage but came on as a substitute in each of their matches in the knockout stage. This included the final on 1 July, which he entered as a 59th-minute substitute as Spain beat Italy 4–0 at the Olympic Stadium in Kyiv.

Pedro scored the first hat-trick of his career on 12 October 2012 in a 4–0 away win over Belarus in a 2014 World Cup qualifier. He was part of the squad that came runners-up at the 2013 FIFA Confederations Cup in Brazil, scoring in a 2–1 opening win over Uruguay. He was chosen for the 2014 FIFA World Cup in the same country, a group-stage exit for the holders. At UEFA Euro 2016 in France, he attracted attention for saying that his substitute role was "not worth" his time. Pedro was not chosen for the 2018 FIFA World Cup, nor were his Chelsea teammates Álvaro Morata, Cesc Fàbregas or Marcos Alonso.

== Style of play ==
A quick, versatile two-footed forward, Pedro usually played as a left winger, although he was capable of playing on either flank, as well as in several other positions in both attack and midfield. He often played on the right flank for the Spanish national team. Pedro was known for his strong all-round skillset, as well as his ability both to score and create goals. He was described as an attacking threat on counter-attacks.

== Career statistics ==
=== Club ===
Appearances and goals by club, season and competition
Club	Season	League			National cup (Note: Includes Copa del Rey, FA Cup, Coppa Italia)		League cup (Note: Includes Football League Cup/EFL Cup)		Europe		Other		Total	
Club	Season	Division	Apps	Goals	Apps	Goals	Apps	Goals	Apps	Goals	Apps	Goals	Apps	Goals
Barcelona C	2005–06	Tercera División	34	4	—		—		—		—		34	4
Barcelona C	2006–07	Tercera División	37	7	—		—		—		—		37	7
Barcelona C	Total		71	11	—		—		—		—		71	11
Barcelona B	2006–07	Segunda División B	1	0	—		—		—		—		1	0
Barcelona B	2007–08	Tercera División	33	6	—		—		—		4 (Note: Appearances in Tercera División play-offs)	1	37	7
Barcelona B	2008–09	Segunda División B	17	10	—		—		—		—		17	10
Barcelona B	Total		51	16	—		—		—		4	1	55	17
Barcelona	2007–08	La Liga	2	0	0	0	—		0	0	—		2	0
Barcelona	2008–09	La Liga	6	0	3	0	—		5 (Note: Appearances in UEFA Champions League)	0	—		14	0
Barcelona	2009–10	La Liga	34	12	4	3	—		9	4	5 (Note: Two appearances and one goal in Supercopa de España, one appearance and one goal in UEFA Super Cup, two appearances and two goals in FIFA Club World Cup)	4	52	23
Barcelona	2010–11	La Liga	33	13	7	4	—		12	5	1 (Note: Appearance(s) in Supercopa de España)	0	53	22
Barcelona	2011–12	La Liga	29	5	5	4	—		9	4	5 (Note: Two appearances in Supercopa de España, one in UEFA Super Cup, two in FIFA Club World Cup)	0	48	13
Barcelona	2012–13	La Liga	28	7	5	1	—		10	1	2	1	45	10
Barcelona	2013–14	La Liga	37	15	8	3	—		7	1	2	0	54	19
Barcelona	2014–15	La Liga	35	6	6	5	—		9	0	—		50	11
Barcelona	2015–16	La Liga	—		—		—		—		3 (Note: One appearance and one goal in UEFA Super Cup, two appearances in Supercopa de España)	1	3	1
Barcelona	Total		204	58	38	20	—		61	15	18	6	321	99
Chelsea	2015–16	Premier League	29	7	4	0	1	1	6	0	—		40	8
Chelsea	2016–17	Premier League	35	9	5	4	3	0	—		—		43	13
Chelsea	2017–18	Premier League	31	4	6	2	3	0	7	1	1 (Note: Appearance in FA Community Shield)	0	48	7
Chelsea	2018–19	Premier League	31	8	1	0	5	0	14 (Note: Appearances in UEFA Europa League)	5	1	0	52	13
Chelsea	2019–20	Premier League	11	1	6	0	2	1	3	0	1 (Note: Appearance in UEFA Super Cup)	0	23	2
Chelsea	Total		137	29	22	6	14	2	30	6	3	0	206	43
Roma	2020–21	Serie A	27	5	1	0	—		12	1	—		40	6
Lazio	2021–22	Serie A	32	9	1	0	—		8	1	—		41	10
Lazio	2022–23	Serie A	36	4	2	0	—		8 (Note: Five appearances and two goals in UEFA Europa League, three appearances and one goal in UEFA Europa Conference League)	3	—		46	7
Lazio	2023–24	Serie A	33	1	3	0	—		8	2	1 (Note: Appearance in Supercoppa Italiana)	0	45	3
Lazio	2024–25	Serie A	30	10	2	0	—		12	4	—		44	14
Lazio	2025–26	Serie A	29	5	4	0	—		—		—		33	5
Lazio	Total		160	29	12	0	—		36	10	1	0	209	39
Career total			650	148	73	26	14	2	139	32	26	7	902	215

=== International ===
Appearances and goals by national team and year
National team	Year	Apps	Goals
Spain	2010	11	1
Spain	2011	4	1
Spain	2012	8	7
Spain	2013	14	4
Spain	2014	11	3
Spain	2015	6	0
Spain	2016	6	1
Spain	2017	5	0
Total		65	17

Scores and results list Spain's goal tally first, score column indicates score after each Pedro goal

List of international goals scored by Pedro
No.	Date	Venue	Cap	Opponent	Score	Result	Competition	Ref.
1	8 June 2010	Estadio Nueva Condomina, Murcia, Spain	3	Poland	6–0	6–0	Friendly	
2	7 June 2011	Estadio José Antonio Anzoátegui, Puerto la Cruz, Venezuela	13	Venezuela	2–0	3–0	Friendly	
3	7 September 2012	Estadio Municipal de Pasarón, Pontevedra, Spain	19	Saudi Arabia	2–0	5–0	Friendly	
4	7 September 2012	Estadio Municipal de Pasarón, Pontevedra, Spain	19	Saudi Arabia	5–0	5–0	Friendly	
5	12 October 2012	Dinamo Stadium, Minsk, Belarus	21	Belarus	2–0	4–0	2014 FIFA World Cup qualification	
6	12 October 2012	Dinamo Stadium, Minsk, Belarus	21	Belarus	3–0	4–0	2014 FIFA World Cup qualification	
7	12 October 2012	Dinamo Stadium, Minsk, Belarus	21	Belarus	4–0	4–0	2014 FIFA World Cup qualification	
8	14 November 2012	Estadio Rommel Fernández, Panama City, Panama	23	Panama	1–0	5–1	Friendly	
9	14 November 2012	Estadio Rommel Fernández, Panama City, Panama	23	Panama	3–0	5–1	Friendly	
10	6 February 2013	Khalifa International Stadium, Doha, Qatar	24	Uruguay	2–1	3–1	Friendly	
11	6 February 2013	Khalifa International Stadium, Doha, Qatar	24	Uruguay	3–1	3–1	Friendly	
12	26 March 2013	Stade de France, Saint-Denis, France	26	France	1–0	1–0	2014 FIFA World Cup qualification	
13	16 June 2013	Arena Pernambuco, Recife, Brazil	28	Uruguay	1–0	2–1	2013 FIFA Confederations Cup	
14	5 March 2014	Vicente Calderón Stadium, Madrid, Spain	38	Italy	1–0	1–0	Friendly	
15	8 September 2014	Estadi Ciutat de València, Valencia, Spain	44	Macedonia	5–1	5–1	UEFA Euro 2016 qualifying	
16	15 November 2014	Estadio Nuevo Colombino, Huelva, Spain	47	Belarus	3–0	3–0	UEFA Euro 2016 qualifying	
17	29 May 2016	AFG Arena, St. Gallen, Switzerland	56	Bosnia and Herzegovina	3–1	3–1	Friendly	

== Honours ==
Barcelona B

- Tercera División: 2007–08

Barcelona

- La Liga: 2008–09, 2009–10, 2010–11, 2012–13, 2014–15
- Copa del Rey: 2008–09, 2011–12, 2014–15; runner-up: 2010–11, 2013–14
- Supercopa de España: 2009, 2010, 2011, 2013
- UEFA Champions League: 2008–09, 2010–11, 2014–15
- UEFA Super Cup: 2009, 2011, 2015
- FIFA Club World Cup: 2009, 2011

Chelsea

- Premier League: 2016–17
- FA Cup: 2017–18; runner-up: 2016–17, 2019–20
- UEFA Europa League: 2018–19
- EFL Cup runner-up: 2018–19

Lazio

- Coppa Italia runner-up: 2025–26

Spain

- FIFA World Cup: 2010
- UEFA European Championship: 2012
- FIFA Confederations Cup runner-up: 2013

Individual

- La Liga's Breakthrough Player: 2009–10
- Premier League Goal of the Month: November 2016, April 2017
- UEFA Europa League Squad of the Season: 2018–19
- Lazio Goal of the Year: 2024
