= Igor Gabilondo =

Spanish footballer (born 1979)

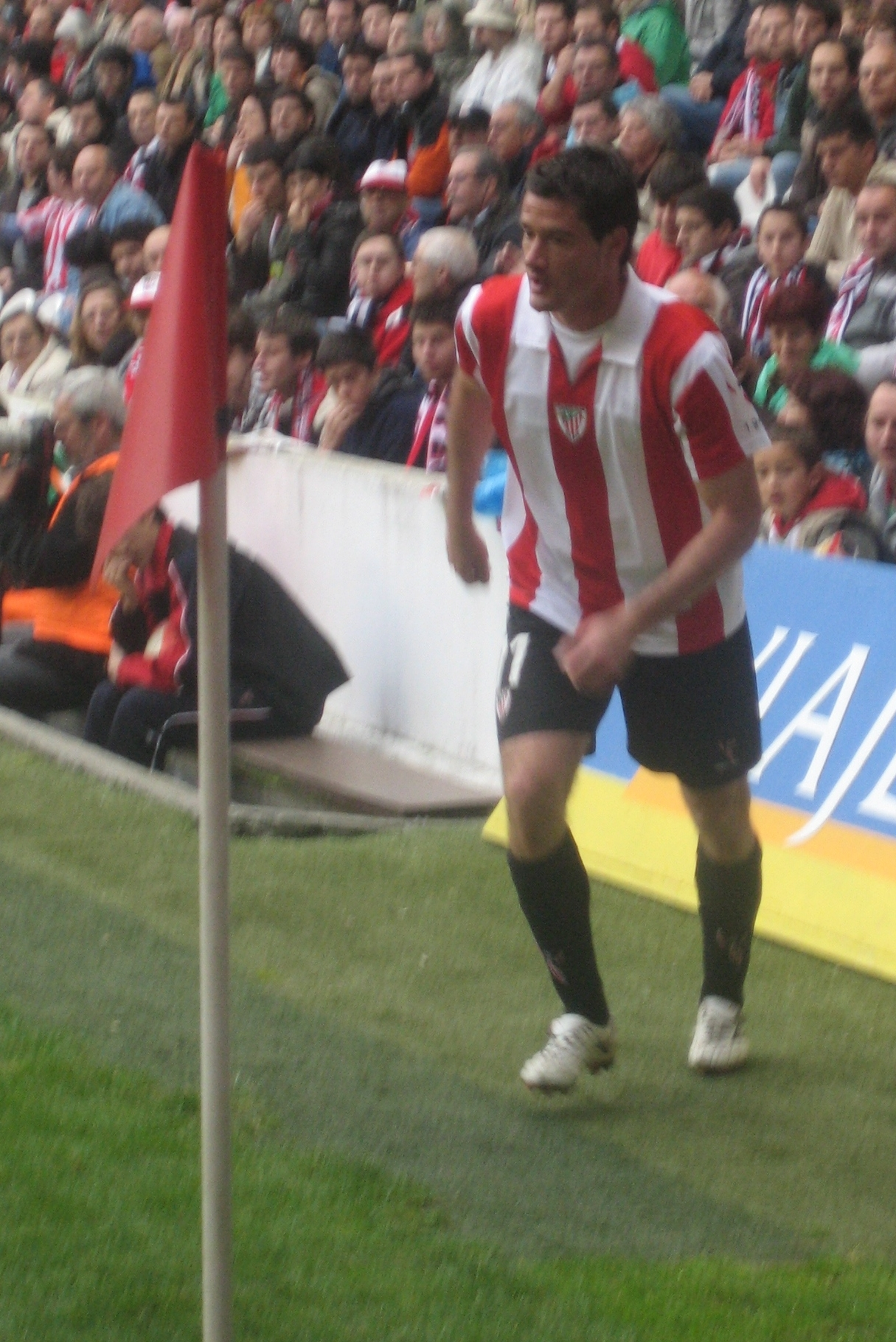
- Gabilondo with Athletic Bilbao in 2008

Personal information
- Full name: Igor Gabilondo del Campo
- Date of birth: 10 February 1979 (age 47)
- Place of birth: San Sebastián, Spain
- Height: 1.85 m (6 ft 1 in)
- Position: Midfielder

Youth career
- Añorga
- 1993–1997: Real Sociedad

Senior career*
Years	Team	Apps	(Gls)
1997–2000	Real Sociedad B		
2000–2006	Real Sociedad	129	(13)
2006–2012	Athletic Bilbao	147	(20)
2012	AEK Larnaca	6	(0)
Total		282	(33)

International career
2002–2011	Basque Country	12	(1)
- * Club domestic league appearances and goals

Igor Gabilondo del Campo (born 10 February 1979) is a Spanish former professional footballer who played as a left midfielder.

He played mainly for Real Sociedad and Athletic Bilbao (six seasons apiece) during his career, amassing La Liga totals of 276 games and 33 goals.

== Club career ==
Gabilondo was born in San Sebastián, Gipuzkoa. A product of Real Sociedad's youth system, he appeared sparingly for the first team in his first two seasons as a professional but went on to become an important element for the Basque club, scoring five La Liga goals in 33 games in the 2003–04 campaign.

In 2006, Gabilondo moved to local rivals Athletic Bilbao on a free transfer, producing roughly the same numbers in his first two seasons (59 matches and seven goals). On 7 April 2007, he scored the game's only goal in a home win against Valencia CF.

Gabilondo was used sparingly in 2008–09, but the 30-year-old regained his importance the following year, netting three times during the season, two of those coming in 4–1 home victories over CD Tenerife and UD Almería– his side finished eighth.

In 2010–11, veteran Gabilondo was regularly used by Athletic Bilbao, alternating between the starting XI and the substitutes' bench. He equalled a career-best five goals, either from free kicks or long-distance shots, also scoring in a 2–0 home defeat of AD Alcorcón in that campaign's Copa del Rey (3–0 on aggregate). In what proved to be his final season at the San Mamés Stadium, he featured 21 times in all competitions but only completed 90 minutes on two occasions. His most significant involvement was opening the scoring with a volley in the 2–0 win over Paris Saint-Germain FC in the group stage of the UEFA Europa League; they reached the final of that competition, in which he was an unused substitute (as was the case in the decisive match in the domestic cup, both matches ending in 3–0 losses).

On 10 July 2012, aged 33, Gabilondo moved abroad for the first time in his career, signing for one year with an option for a further season with AEK Larnaca FC in the Cypriot First Division and rejoining his former Athletic teammate Ander Murillo. He left shortly after, however, with injuries and recently becoming a father cited as the reasons.

== International career ==
On 28 December 2011, Gabilondo equalled Julen Guerrero as the most capped played in the history of the Basque Country regional team. The match against Tunisia was his 12th appearance with the Euskal Herriko Selekzioa.

== Personal life ==
Gabilondo's father José Manuel and his uncle Francisco Javier were both footballers, spending their careers mostly in the Segunda División B.

== Honours ==
Athletic Bilbao

- Copa del Rey runner-up: 2008–09, 2011–12
- Supercopa de España runner-up: 2009
- UEFA Europa League runner-up: 2011–12
