= David López (footballer, born 1982) =

Spanish footballer

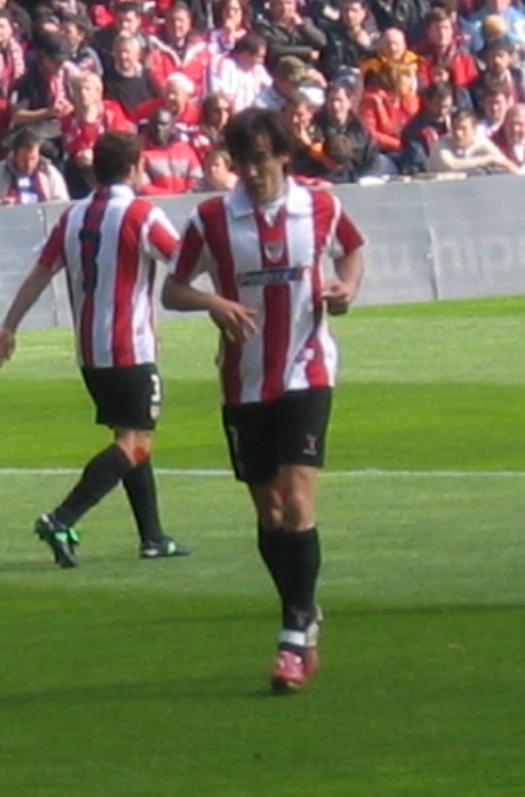
- López with Athletic Bilbao in 2009

Personal information
- Full name: David López Moreno
- Date of birth: 10 September 1982 (age 44)
- Place of birth: Logroño, Spain
- Height: 1.81 m (5 ft 11 1/2 in)
- Position: Midfielder

Youth career
- 2000–2001: Osasuna

Senior career*
Years	Team	Apps	(Gls)
2001–2004	Osasuna B	81	(7)
2004–2007	Osasuna	78	(11)
2007–2012	Athletic Bilbao	118	(12)
2012–2014	Brighton & Hove Albion	65	(12)
2014–2016	Lugo	67	(5)
2016–2017	Huesca	19	(0)
2017–2018	UCAM Murcia	14	(2)
2018–2019	Novelda	28	(3)
2019	Intercity	7	(0)
2019–2021	Eldense	49	(3)
2021–2022	Callosa Deportiva	31	(0)
2022–2023	Caravaca	21	(1)
Total		578	(56)
- * Club domestic league appearances and goals

David López Moreno (born 10 September 1982) is a Spanish former professional footballer who played as a midfielder.

He amassed La Liga totals of 196 matches and 23 goals over eight seasons, for Osasuna (three years) and Athletic Bilbao (five). He also spent two years in the English Championship with Brighton & Hove Albion.

== Club career ==
=== Osasuna ===
López was born in Logroño, La Rioja. A product of CA Osasuna's youth ranks, he made his first-team – and La Liga – debut on 17 October 2004 in a 3–2 home win against Albacete Balompié, and finished his first season with 13 games and one goal, scored in his first appearance.

The following campaign, López was an undisputed starter as the Navarrese side achieved a first-ever qualification for the UEFA Champions League. The player contributed six goals to this feat, including a crucial one in the last matchday, a 2–1 home victory over Valencia CF.

As Osasuna were relegated to the UEFA Cup, López appeared 11 in matches in the team's semi-finals run, netting in 3–0 away defeats of Parma FC (twice) and Bayer 04 Leverkusen.

=== Athletic Bilbao ===
In summer 2007, López signed with neighbours Athletic Bilbao for around €6 million. His competitive debut was on 28 August in a 0–0 home draw against his former team, and he was first-choice in his first two years, totalling 60 league matches; in his second he helped the Basques to narrowly avoid relegation, scoring at Recreativo de Huelva (1–1), and at home against Sporting de Gijón (3–0) and Racing de Santander (2–1, through a penalty).

López netted six goals from 28 appearances in 2010–11 to match the highest total in his career, but he became a fringe player for the Lions after the arrival of Argentine Marcelo Bielsa as club manager. On 31 August 2012, his contract with Athletic was rescinded by mutual consent.

=== Brighton & Hove Albion ===
Immediately after being released, López transferred to Brighton & Hove Albion in the Championship, signing a one-year contract. During his spell at the Falmer Stadium, he was nicknamed 'Spanish Dave'.

=== Later years ===
After leaving England at the age of 32, López spent three full seasons in his country's Segunda División, first with CD Lugo and then SD Huesca. Subsequently, he took his game to the lower leagues.

== Honours ==
Athletic Bilbao

- Copa del Rey runner-up: 2008–09, 2011–12
- Supercopa de España runner-up: 2009
- UEFA Europa League runner-up: 2011–12
