= Ion Vélez =

Spanish footballer (born 1985)

Personal information
- Full name: Ion Vélez Martínez
- Date of birth: 17 February 1985 (age 41)
- Place of birth: Tafalla, Spain
- Height: 1.84 m (6 ft 0 in)
- Position: Forward

Youth career
- Peña Sport

Senior career*
Years	Team	Apps	(Gls)
2003–2004	Peña Sport	31	(4)
2004–2005	Basconia	26	(7)
2005–2007	Bilbao Athletic	20	(4)
2006–2007	→ Barakaldo (loan)	32	(12)
2007–2011	Athletic Bilbao	44	(3)
2008	→ Hércules (loan)	20	(5)
2011	→ Numancia (loan)	18	(0)
2011–2013	Girona	27	(2)
2013–2015	Alavés	56	(9)
2015–2016	Mirandés	30	(2)
2016–2019	Tudelano	85	(11)
2019–2020	Peña Sport	16	(2)
Total		405	(61)
- * Club domestic league appearances and goals

Ion Vélez Martínez (born 17 February 1985) is a Spanish former professional footballer who played as a forward.

== Club career ==
Vélez was born in Tafalla, Navarre. Bought by Athletic Bilbao from lowly Peña Sport FC in 2003, he spent time with the club's B and farm teams, subsequently being loaned to neighbours Barakaldo CF in the Segunda División B. He made his debut for the main squad of the latter on 26 August 2007, in the goalless La Liga home draw against CA Osasuna.

After spending the second part of 2007–08 on loan to Segunda División's Hércules CF, where he featured significantly – after his debut with the Alicante side, he managed to play, in the same season, in the three major levels of Spanish football– Vélez was definitely promoted to Athletic's first team for 2008–09. He was regularly used during the season (28 matches, although only four complete) and, on 9 May 2009, scored the game's only goal as the Basques defeated Real Betis at home.

Vélez made only five official appearances for Athletic during the first part of the 2010–11 campaign, all as a second-half substitute. On 19 January 2011 he moved to CD Numancia from division two on loan, reuniting with former Athletic teammate and namesake Iñigo Vélez. In late July, after being deemed surplus to requirements by new manager Marcelo Bielsa, he terminated his contract at the San Mamés Stadium and signed for Girona FC of the same tier, with his former club having a rebuying option at the end of 2011–12.

On 3 October 2011, during an away league fixture against Xerez CD, Velez collided with opponent goalkeeper Toni Doblas, suffering an extremely serious injury to his right knee that sidelined him for several months. In July 2013 he signed with Deportivo Alavés, recently promoted to the second division.

Vélez agreed to a one-year deal with fellow second-tier CD Mirandés on 13 July 2015. He returned to the third prior to the start of the 2016–17 season, joining CD Tudelano.

In November 2017, following a match against his former club Mirandés where he was sent off for kicking an opponent, Vélez was banned for four games. Upon appeal, it was later reduced to two.

On 24 June 2019, the 34-year-old Vélez returned to Peña Sport. At the end of the season, he retired.
