= Carlos Gurpegui =

Spanish footballer (born 1980)

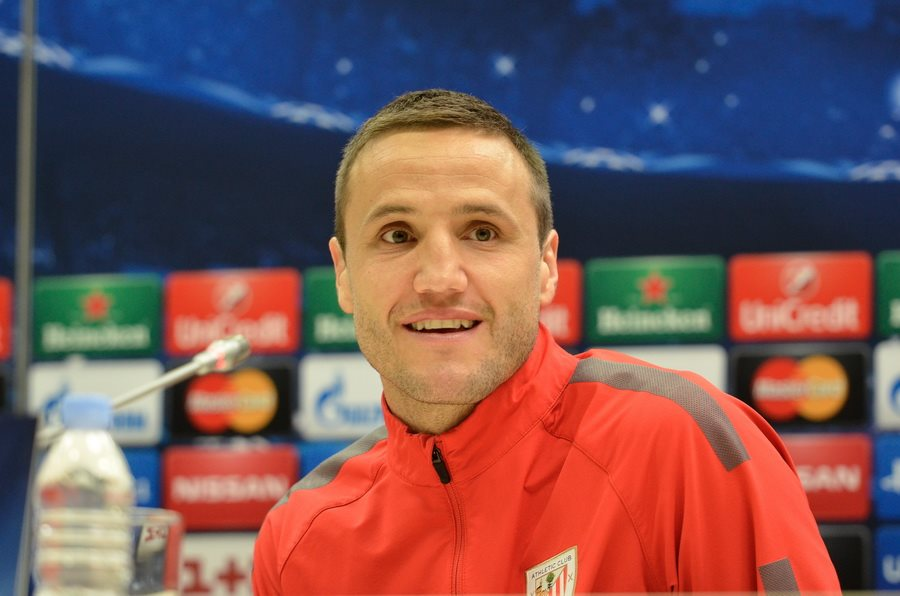
- Gurpegui in 2014

Personal information
- Full name: Carlos Gurpegui Nausia
- Date of birth: 19 August 1980 (age 46)
- Place of birth: Pamplona, Spain
- Height: 1.81 m (5 ft 11 in)
- Positions: Centre-back; defensive midfielder

Youth career
- River Ega
- 1997–1998: Izarra
- 1998–1999: Athletic Bilbao

Senior career*
Years	Team	Apps	(Gls)
1998	Izarra	1	(0)
1999–2000	Basconia	33	(15)
2000–2002	Bilbao Athletic	56	(5)
2002–2016	Athletic Bilbao	313	(18)
Total		403	(38)

International career
2003–2016	Basque Country	6	(1)
2005	Navarre	1	(0)

Managerial career
- 2021–2023: Basconia
- 2023–2024: Bilbao Athletic
- * Club domestic league appearances and goals

Carlos Gurpegui Nausia (alternate spelling Gurpegi; born 19 August 1980) is a Spanish football manager and former player who played as a central defender or defensive midfielder.

He spent his entire professional career with Athletic Bilbao, which was marred by a two-year ban due to a nandrolone positive test. Over 14 La Liga seasons, he appeared in 393 matches in all competitions and scored 22 goals.

== Club career ==
Born in Pamplona and raised in the village of Andosilla, Navarre, Gurpegui was a product of Athletic Bilbao's Lezama youth academy, and made his first-team – and La Liga – debut on 31 March 2002 in a 5–2 away defeat against Villarreal, going on to establish himself as the first-choice holding midfielder in the following years with 121 games in four seasons. On 17 January 2004, he scored a late equaliser against Barcelona in a 1–1 draw at the Camp Nou.

Gurpegui was banned for two years on 3 November 2003, for testing positive for nandrolone in a 1 September 2002 game against Real Sociedad (4–2 away defeat, scoring both goals) the previous season. The ban was initially suspended after repeated appeals, with the player claiming that his body produced nandrolone naturally, but the appeals were in vain and he eventually was forced to serve his sentence, which ran until 23 April 2008; Athletic Bilbao, however, neither released the player nor took his number from the official squad, and he returned to action in a 3–0 away loss to Real Madrid four days later.

In the 2008–09 campaign, Gurpegui was used mostly as a backup due to the emergence of youngster Javi Martínez, but regained his starting position in the following years, precisely alongside Martínez. On 28 November 2010, he headed home in the last minute against hometown club Osasuna, in a 1–0 home win.

Gurpegui was again an important player in 2011–12 under new coach Marcelo Bielsa. On 23 October 2011, having replaced Andoni Iraola at half-time in an eventual 1–1 draw at Valencia, he also had to leave the pitch early into the second half, with a torn anterior cruciate ligament which ended his season.

After Martínez left in summer 2012 to join Bayern Munich, Gurpegui was chosen by Bielsa as the next player to be converted from defensive midfielder to central defender. After playing a big role in their qualification for the tournament through finishing fourth domestically in 2013–14, partnering the much younger Aymeric Laporte, he featured in defence in six matches in the subsequent edition of the UEFA Champions League.

The team reached three finals of the Copa del Rey in Gurpegui's time at the San Mamés Stadium, losing them all to Barcelona – he was an unused substitute on every occasion. He did play in both legs of the 2015 Supercopa de España against the same opponents, lifting the trophy as captain.

On 11 May 2016, by now a fringe player, 35-year-old Gurpegui announced he would retire from the game at the end of the season.

== International career ==
Gurpegui played six matches (one goal) for the unofficial Basque selection. He also featured for the equivalent Navarrese team.

Gurpegui had already retired from club football when he appeared in his last friendly for the Basque Country on 27 May 2016, a draw and win on penalties over Corsica.

== Coaching career ==
On retiring from playing, Gurpegui was appointed to a coaching role at Athletic Bilbao working under Ernesto Valverde. However, when the latter moved to Barcelona in the 2017 off-season he did not take the former with him, nor was there any place in the new structure under José Ángel Ziganda; instead, Gurpegui was appointed as an ambassador for the club.

In December 2021, having rejoined Athletic's coaching network, Gurpegui signed as manager of the farm team, Basconia, with previous incumbent Patxi Salinas having moved up to the reserves. On 30 May 2023, he replaced Alex Pallarés at the helm of the latter, recently relegated to Segunda Federación.

On 6 May 2024, after achieving promotion to the Primera Federación as league winners, Gurpegui stepped down from his position.

== Personal life ==
Gurpegui's older brother, Pedro María, was also a footballer who played as a forward. He had a spell in the reserve side of Osasuna, coming up against his younger sibling in a league fixture in the semi-professional Segunda División B in 2000.

Pedro's career stalled after a serious knee injury, and he never played above that level.

== Career statistics ==
Appearances and goals by club, season and competition
Club	Season	League			Copa del Rey		Continental		Other		Total	
Club	Season	Division	Apps	Goals	Apps	Goals	Apps	Goals	Apps	Goals	Apps	Goals
Izarra	1997–98	Segunda División B	1	0	0	0	—		—		1	0
Basconia	1999–2000	Tercera División	33	15	—		—		—		33	15
Bilbao Athletic	1999–2000	Segunda División B	1	0	—		—		—		1	0
Bilbao Athletic	2000–01	Segunda División B	23	2	—		—		—		23	2
Bilbao Athletic	2001–02	Segunda División B	32	3	—		—		—		32	3
Bilbao Athletic	Total		56	5	0	0	0	0	0	0	56	5
Athletic Bilbao	2001–02	La Liga	4	0	0	0	—		—		4	0
Athletic Bilbao	2002–03	La Liga	27	4	1	0	—		—		28	4
Athletic Bilbao	2003–04	La Liga	30	1	1	0	—		—		31	1
Athletic Bilbao	2004–05	La Liga	34	4	8	0	8 (Note: Appearances in UEFA Europa League)	2	—		50	6
Athletic Bilbao	2005–06	La Liga	30	2	3	0	—		—		33	2
Athletic Bilbao	2006–07 (Note: Banned)	La Liga	0	0	0	0	—		—		0	0
Athletic Bilbao	2007–08	La Liga	5	0	0	0	—		—		5	0
Athletic Bilbao	2008–09	La Liga	19	0	7	0	—		—		26	0
Athletic Bilbao	2009–10	La Liga	34	1	1	0	7	0	2 (Note: Appearances in Supercopa de España)	0	44	1
Athletic Bilbao	2010–11	La Liga	31	2	4	1	—		—		35	3
Athletic Bilbao	2011–12	La Liga	7	0	0	0	2	0	—		9	0
Athletic Bilbao	2012–13	La Liga	27	1	0	0	7	0	—		34	1
Athletic Bilbao	2013–14	La Liga	27	2	5	0	—		—		32	2
Athletic Bilbao	2014–15	La Liga	23	1	6	0	8 (Note: Appearances in UEFA Europa League and UEFA Champions League)	1	—		37	2
Athletic Bilbao	2015–16	La Liga	15	0	1	0	7	0	2	0	25	0
Athletic Bilbao	Total		313	18	37	1	39	3	4	0	393	22
Career total			403	38	37	1	39	3	4	0	483	42

== Managerial statistics ==
As of 5 May 2024

Managerial record by team and tenure
Team	Nat	From	To	Record								Ref
Team	Nat	From	To	G	W	D	L	GF	GA	GD	Win %	Ref
Basconia	(Spain)	14 December 2021	30 May 2023	53	26	15	12	87	59	+28	49.06	
Bilbao Athletic	(Spain)	30 May 2023	6 May 2024	34	25	7	2	68	17	+51	73.53	
Total				87	51	22	14	155	76	+79	58.62	—

== Honours ==
Athletic Bilbao

- Supercopa de España: 2015; runner-up: 2009
- Copa del Rey runner-up: 2008–09, 2011–12, 2014–15

== See also ==
- List of sportspeople sanctioned for doping offences
