= 2019–20 Athletic Bilbao season =

Athletic Bilbao
2019–20 season
- President: Aitor Elizegi
- Head coach: Gaizka Garitano; Marcelino (for Copa del Rey Final)
- Stadium: San Mamés
- La Liga: 11th
- Copa del Rey: Runners-up
- Top goalscorer: League: Raúl García (15); All: Raúl García (15)
- Highest home attendance: 49,154 (vs Barcelona, 6 February 2020)
- Lowest home attendance: 33,364 (vs Levante, 10 November 2019)
Home colours	Away colours	Third colours

The 2019–20 season was the 121st in Athletic Club’s history and the 89th in the top tier.

The season marks the first since the 2006–07 without Markel Susaeta who departed to Gamba Osaka in the summer and the first since 2007–08 without Ander Iturraspe who departed to RCD Espanyol in the same summer.

== Squad ==
According to the official website.

=== Player statistics ===
- Includes the 2020 Copa del Rey Final, delayed until April 2021 and counted in the 2020–21 season in some resources – the match article has specifics of each player's involvement.

S	P	N	Name	League				Cup				Total			
S	P	N	Name	A	S	G	M	A	S	G	M	A	S	G	M
1	GK	(Spain)	Unai Simón	34	0	0	2992	4	0	0	360	38	0	0	3352
3	DF	(Spain)	Unai Núñez	16	4	0	1569	6	0	0	484	22	4	0	2053
4	DF	(Spain)	Iñigo Martínez	33	0	1	2970	8	0	0	780	41	0	1	3750
5	DF	(Spain)	Yeray Álvarez	32	0	0	2811	6	0	0	570	38	0	0	3381
6	MF	(Spain)	Mikel San José	3	6	0	355	1	2	0	109	4	8	0	464
7	MF	(Spain)	Beñat Etxebarria	3	8	0	388	3	0	1	234	6	8	1	622
8	MF	(Spain)	Unai López	24	2	1	1804	1	3	0	172	25	5	1	1976
9	FW	(Spain)	Iñaki Williams	34	4	6	2957	7	1	3 (Note: Williams is credited with an additional goal against Barcelona by some sources.)	670	41	5	9	3627
10	FW	(Spain)	Iker Muniain (c)	26	5	5	2393	5	2	1	567	31	7	6	2960
11	FW	(Spain)	Iñigo Córdoba	21	3	1	1448	1	1	0	76	22	4	1	1524
12 (Note: Larrazabal had the #12 squad number in the usual timespan of season 2019–20, disrupted by the COVID-19 pandemic in Spain. At the start of the next season Larrazabal left the club and Berenguer arrived, taking the squad number and wearing this when appeared in the delayed 2020 Copa del Rey Final.)	FW	(Spain)	Gaizka Larrazabal	2	8	0	244	1	0	0	83	3	8	0	327
13	GK	(Spain)	Iago Herrerín	4	1	0	424	4	0	0	302	8	1	0	726
14	MF	(Spain)	Dani García	33	3	0	3027	5	0	0	460	38	3	0	3487
15	DF	(Spain)	Iñigo Lekue	6	8	0	617	3	1	0	318	9	9	0	935
16 (Note: Vesga wore #6 in the delayed 2020 Copa del Rey Final, San José having left the club and vacated the number.)	MF	(Spain)	Mikel Vesga	13	7	0	1264	5	2	0	507	18	9	0	1771
17	DF	(Spain)	Yuri Berchiche	32	1	2	2851	6	1	4	613	38	2	6	3464
18	DF	(Spain)	Óscar de Marcos	6	7	0	540	1	0	0	90	7	7	0	630
19	FW	(Spain)	Ibai Gómez	6	11	0	690	2	1	1	181	8	12	1	871
20	FW	(Spain)	Aritz Aduriz	0	14	1	194	0	3	0	47	0	17	1	241
21	DF	(Spain)	Ander Capa	32	3	3	2875	5	2	0	469	37	5	3	3344
22	MF	(Spain)	Raúl García	33	2	15	2876	8	0	0	709	41	2	15	3585
23	FW	(Bosnia and Herzegovina)	Kenan Kodro	4	8	1	360	0	1	1	7	4	9	2	367
24	DF	(Spain)	Mikel Balenziaga	6	3	0	562	2	0	0	167	8	3	0	729
25 (Note: Villalibre wore #6 in the delayed 2020 Copa del Rey Final, Aduriz having retired and vacated the number.)	FW	(Spain)	Asier Villalibre	5	14	3	523	2	3	2	211	7	17	5	734
27	MF	(Spain)	Unai Vencedor	1	0	0	74	1	0	0	68	2	0	0	142
31	GK	(Spain)	Jokin Ezkieta	0	0	0	0	0	1	0	116	0	1	0	116
34	MF	(Spain)	Oihan Sancet	9	8	1	742	0	2	0	23	9	10	1	765
Player arrived after end of regular season
12	MF	(Spain)	Álex Berenguer	0	0	0	0	1	0	0	76	1	0	0	76

=== Disciplinary record ===
- Includes the 2020 Copa del Rey Final, delayed until April 2021 and counted in the 2020–21 season in some resources – the match article has specifics of each player's involvement.

S	P	N	Name	League			Cup			Total		
S	P	N	Name	Yellow card	Yellow-red card	Red card	Yellow card	Yellow-red card	Red card	Yellow card	Yellow-red card	Red card
1	GK	(Spain)	Unai Simón	2	0	1	1	0	0	3	0	1
3	DF	(Spain)	Unai Núñez	7	0	0	0	0	0	7	0	0
4	DF	(Spain)	Iñigo Martínez	10	0	0	2	0	0	12	0	0
5	DF	(Spain)	Yeray Álvarez	2	0	0	2	0	0	4	0	0
6	MF	(Spain)	Mikel San José	3	0	0	0	0	0	3	0	0
7	MF	(Spain)	Beñat Etxebarria	0	0	0	0	0	0	0	0	0
8	MF	(Spain)	Unai López	6	0	0	0	0	0	6	0	0
9	FW	(Spain)	Iñaki Williams	3	0	0	2	0	0	5	0	0
10	FW	(Spain)	Iker Muniain	4	0	1	0	0	0	4	0	1
11	FW	(Spain)	Iñigo Córdoba	4	0	0	0	0	0	4	0	0
12	FW	(Spain)	Gaizka Larrazabal	0	0	0	0	0	0	0	0	0
13	GK	(Spain)	Iago Herrerín	0	0	0	0	0	1	0	0	1
14	MF	(Spain)	Dani García	11	0	0	4	0	0	15	0	0
15	DF	(Spain)	Iñigo Lekue	0	0	0	0	0	0	0	0	0
16	MF	(Spain)	Mikel Vesga	3	0	0	2	0	0	5	0	0
17	DF	(Spain)	Yuri Berchiche	7	0	0	2	0	0	9	0	0
18	DF	(Spain)	Óscar de Marcos	1	0	0	0	0	0	1	0	0
19	FW	(Spain)	Ibai Gómez	0	0	0	0	0	0	0	0	0
20	FW	(Spain)	Aritz Aduriz	3	0	0	1	0	0	4	0	0
21	DF	(Spain)	Ander Capa	10	0	0	0	0	0	10	0	0
22	MF	(Spain)	Raúl García	11	0	0	1	0	0	12	0	0
23	FW	(Bosnia and Herzegovina)	Kenan Kodro	0	0	0	0	0	0	0	0	0
24	DF	(Spain)	Mikel Balenziaga	1	0	0	0	0	0	1	0	0
25	FW	(Spain)	Asier Villalibre	0	0	0	0	0	0	0	0	0
27	MF	(Spain)	Unai Vencedor	1	0	0	0	0	0	1	0	0
31	GK	(Spain)	Jokin Ezkieta	0	0	0	0	0	0	0	0	0
34	MF	(Spain)	Oihan Sancet	1	0	0	0	0	0	1	0	0

=== From the youth system ===
Note: Flags indicate national team as defined under FIFA eligibility rules; some limited exceptions apply. Players may hold more than one non-FIFA nationality.

No.	Pos.	Nation	Player
12	FW	ESP	Gaizka Larrazabal
25	FW	ESP	Asier Villalibre
27	MF	ESP	Unai Vencedor
34	MF	ESP	Oihan Sancet

=== Transfer ===
In

Date	Player	From	Type/Fee	Source
30 June 2019	(Spain) Mikel Vesga	(Spain) Leganés	Loan return	
1 July 2019	(Spain) Jokin Ezkieta	(Spain) Barcelona B	Free	

Out

Date	Player	To	Type/Fee	Source
30 June 2019	(Spain) Ander Iturraspe	(Spain) Espanyol	Free	
30 June 2019	(Spain) Mikel Rico	(Spain) Huesca	Free	
30 June 2019	(Spain) Markel Susaeta	(Japan) Gamba Osaka	Free	
9 August 2019	(Spain) Peru Nolaskoain	(Spain) Deportivo La Coruña	Loan	

== Staff ==
According to the official website:

Position	Name
Head coach	Gaizka Garitano
Assistant coach	Patxi Ferreira
Technical coach	Alberto Iglesias
Physical coach	Juan Ángel Iribarren
Goalkeeper coach	Aitor Iru
Representative	Sendoa Agirre
Head of medical service	Josean Lekue
Doctor	Paco Angulo
Nurses	Álvaro Campa (also physiotherapist), Juanma Ipiña
Physiotherapists	Beñat Azula, Isusko Ortuzar
Regenerative therapist	Xabier Clemente
Materials managers	Jon Eskalza, Iker López

== Pre-season and friendlies ==
20 July 2019 Friendly	Arenas	1–6	Athletic Bilbao	Getxo, Spain
12:00 CEST (UTC+02:00)	Matador 31'	Report	Aduriz 37'; R. García 60'; Williams 64', 83'; Ibai 74'; Vicente 81'	Stadium: Fadura; Referee: Gorka Etayo

27 July 2019 Friendly	SC Paderborn	3–3	Athletic Bilbao	Gütersloh, Germany
17:00 CEST (UTC+02:00)	Zolinski 15'; Vasiliadis 34'; Antwi-Adjei 56'	Report	Larrazabal 1'; Córdoba 74'; Muniain 85'	Stadium: Heidewaldstadion; Referee: Roman Piechota

28 July 2019 Friendly	Borussia Mönchengladbach	0–2	Athletic Bilbao	Velbert, Germany
16:00 CEST (UTC+02:00)		Report	Williams 15' (pen.); Córdoba 50'	Stadium: Christopeit Sport Arena; Referee: Florian Exner

1 August 2019 Friendly	Numancia	1–1	Athletic Bilbao	Soria, Spain
20:00 CEST (UTC+02:00)	Guillermo 7'	Report	Vivian 56'	Stadium: Los Pajaritos; Referee: Álvaro Moreno

3 August 2019 Betway Cup	West Ham United	2–2 (2–4 p)	Athletic Bilbao	London, England
15:00 BST (UTC+01:00)	Lanzini 21'; Wilshere 22'	Report	Haller 1' (o.g.); Williams 15'	Stadium: London; Referee: Michael Oliver
	Penalties
	Hernández (penalty missed); Snodgrass (penalty scored); Yarmolenko (penalty scored); Diangana (penalty missed)		(penalty scored) Aduriz; (penalty scored) Beñat; (penalty missed) Ibai; (penalty scored) Sancet; (penalty scored) Berchiche

4 August 2019 Friendly	Racing Santander	2–1	Athletic Bilbao	Santander, Spain
20:00 CEST (UTC+02:00)	Yoda 10'; Moi 88'	Report	Olaortua 85' (o.g.)	Stadium: El Sardinero; Referee: José López

7 August 2019 Friendly	Roma	2–2	Athletic Bilbao	Perugia, Italy
20:00 CEST (UTC+02:00)	Kolarov 59'; Pellegrini 90' (pen.)	Report	Muniain 28'; R. García 77' (pen.)	Stadium: Renato Curi; Referee: Fabio Maresca

8 August 2019 Friendly	Mirandés	1–2	Athletic Bilbao	Miranda de Ebro, Spain
21:00 CEST (UTC+02:00)	Aias 54' (pen.)	Report	Aduriz 18'; Núñez 51'	Stadium: Anduva; Referee: Iosu Galech

5 September 2019 Friendly	Toulouse	1–2	Athletic Bilbao	Bayonne, France
19:00 CEST (UTC+02:00)	Leya Iseka 8'	Report	Aduriz 31'; Ibai 87' (pen.)	Stadium: Stade Didier Deschamps; Referee: Olivier Thual

10 October 2019 Friendly	Alavés	0–1	Athletic Bilbao	Barakaldo, Spain
20:00 CEST (UTC+02:00)		Report	Larrazabal 28'	Stadium: Lasesarre; Referee: Ekaitz García

10 October 2019 Friendly	Barakaldo	0–0	Athletic Bilbao	Barakaldo, Spain
21:00 CEST (UTC+02:00)		Report		Stadium: Lasesarre; Referee: Ekaitz García

15 November 2019 Friendly	Athletic Bilbao	4–1	Eibar	Lezama, Spain
11:00 CET (UTC+01:00)	Ibai 27'; Villalibre 33'; Kodro 70', 72'	Report	Charles 20'	Stadium: Lezama; Referee: Ekaitz García

== Competitions ==
=== Overview ===
Competition	First match	Last match	Starting round	Final position	Record							
Competition	First match	Last match	Starting round	Final position	Pld	W	D	L	GF	GA	GD	Win %
La Liga	16 August 2019	19 July 2020	Matchday 1	11th	38	13	12	13	41	38	+3	34.21
Copa del Rey	17 December 2019	3 April 2021	First round	Runners-up	8	4	2	2	14	7	+7	50.00
Total					46	17	14	15	55	45	+10	36.96

Source: Competitions

=== La Liga ===
League table

Pos	Team	Pld	W	D	L	GF	GA	GD	Pts
9	Valencia	38	14	11	13	46	53	−7	53
10	Osasuna	38	13	13	12	46	54	−8	52
11	Athletic Bilbao	38	13	12	13	41	38	+3	51
12	Levante	38	14	7	17	47	53	−6	49
13	Valladolid	38	9	15	14	32	43	−11	42

Source: La Liga, Soccerway
Rules for classification: 1) Points; 2) Head-to-head points; 3) Head-to-head goal difference; 4) Goal difference; 5) Goals scored; 6) Fair-play points (Note: Head-to-head record is used only after all the matches between the teams in question have been played)

==== Results summary ====
Overall								Home						Away					
Pld	W	D	L	GF	GA	GD	Pts	W	D	L	GF	GA	GD	W	D	L	GF	GA	GD
38	13	12	13	41	38	+3	51	9	4	6	21	14	+7	4	8	7	20	24	−4

Source: La Liga

Results by round

Round	1	2	3	4	5	6	7	8	9	10	11	12	13	14	15	16	17	18	19	20	21	22	23	24	25	26	27	28	29	30	31	32	33	34	35	36	37	38
Ground	H	A	H	A	H	A	H	A	H	A	H	A	H	A	H	A	H	A	A	H	A	H	A	H	A	H	A	H	A	H	A	H	A	H	H	A	H	A
Result	W	D	W	D	W	D	L	L	D	L	W	D	W	W	W	L	D	D	D	D	D	L	L	L	L	W	W	D	D	W	L	W	W	L	L	W	L	L
Position	5	5	2	4	1	4	7	7	8	10	8	10	6	5	5	6	7	7	8	8	9	9	9	10	11	10	10	10	10	9	10	9	8	8	10	8	10	11

Source: La Liga

==== Matches ====
16 August 2019 1	Athletic Bilbao	1–0	Barcelona	Bilbao
21:00 CEST (UTC+02:00)	Núñez (yellow card) 65'; Aduriz 89'	Report	Piqué (yellow card) 60'	Stadium: San Mamés; Attendance: 47,693; Referee: Carlos del Cerro (Madrid)

24 August 2019 2	Getafe	1–1	Athletic Bilbao	Getafe
21:00 CEST (UTC+02:00)	Mata 12'; Suárez (yellow card) 65'; Bergara (yellow card) 84'	Report	Capa (yellow card) 4'; R. García 6'	Stadium: Coliseum Alfonso Pérez; Attendance: 10,102; Referee: Antonio Mateu (Valencia)

30 August 2019 3	Athletic Bilbao	2–0	Real Sociedad	Bilbao
22:00 CEST (UTC+02:00)	Williams 11'; R. García 28', (yellow card) 36'; Córdoba (yellow card) 72'	Report	Zaldúa (yellow card) 13'; Portu (yellow card) 45+3'	Stadium: San Mamés; Attendance: 46,391; Referee: Xavier Estrada (Catalonia)

13 September 2019 4	Mallorca	0–0	Athletic Bilbao	Palma de Mallorca
21:00 CEST (UTC+02:00)	Rodríguez (yellow card) 1'; Rahman (yellow card) 65'; Abdón (yellow card) 76'; Sevilla (yellow card) 90+7'	Report	D. García (yellow card) 30'; Martínez (yellow card) 43'; López (yellow card) 46'	Stadium: Son Moix; Attendance: 16,121; Referee: Pablo González (Asturia)

22 September 2019 5	Athletic Bilbao	2–0	Alavés	Bilbao
18:30 CEST (UTC+02:00)	R. García 38' (pen.); Muniain 72'; Simón (yellow card) 86'	Report	Ely (yellow card) 7'; Vidal (yellow card) 15'; Duarte (yellow card) 37'; Laguardia (yellow card) 70'	Stadium: San Mamés; Attendance: 45,223; Referee: Jesús Gil (Extremadura)

25 September 2019 6	Leganés	1–1	Athletic Bilbao	Leganés
19:00 CEST (UTC+02:00)	Óscar 61'	Report	R. García 59' (pen.); D. García (yellow card) 75'	Stadium: Butarque; Attendance: 11,036; Referee: José González (Castile and Léon)

28 September 2019 7	Athletic Bilbao	0–1	Valencia	Bilbao
13:00 CEST (UTC+02:00)	López (yellow card) 50'; Aduriz (yellow card) 77'	Report	Cheryshev (yellow card) 20', (goal) 27'; Rodrigo (yellow card) 34'; Diakhaby (yellow card) 46'; Cillessen (yellow card) 88'; Wass (yellow card) 90+4'	Stadium: San Mamés; Attendance: 42,677; Referee: Mario Melero (Andalusia)

6 October 2019 8	Celta Vigo	1–0	Athletic Bilbao	Vigo
14:00 CEST (UTC+02:00)	Aspas 74'	Report	Balenziaga (yellow card) 21'; R. García (yellow card) 40'; Yeray (yellow card) 77'; Martínez (yellow card) 78'; Capa (yellow card) 85'	Stadium: Abanca-Balaídos; Attendance: 19,962; Referee: David Medié (Catalonia)

20 October 2019 9	Athletic Bilbao	1–1	Valladolid	Bilbao
18:30 CEST (UTC+02:00)	Williams 33'; Yeray (yellow card) 58'; Aduriz (yellow card) 79'	Report	Salisu (yellow card) 38'; Martínez 71' (o.g.); Joaquín (yellow card) 75'; Masip (yellow card) 90'	Stadium: San Mamés; Attendance: 36,503; Referee: Jesús Gil (Extremadura)

26 October 2019 10	Atlético Madrid	2–0	Athletic Bilbao	Madrid
21:00 CEST (UTC+02:00)	Saúl 28', (yellow card) 42'; Correa (yellow card) 44'; Morata 64'	Report	R. García (yellow card) 72'; Simón (yellow card) 83'	Stadium: Wanda Metropolitano; Attendance: 59,211; Referee: Alejandro Hernández (Canary Islands)

30 October 2019 11	Athletic Bilbao	3–0	Espanyol	Bilbao
20:00 CET (UTC+01:00)	Muniain 4', 17'; Gómez 79' (o.g.)	Report	Espinosa (yellow card) 53'	Stadium: San Mamés; Attendance: 37,322; Referee: Juan Martínez Munuera (Valencia)

3 November 2019 12	Villarreal	0–0	Athletic Bilbao	Villarreal
14:00 CET (UTC+01:00)	Iborra (yellow card) 60'; Ontiveros (yellow card) 90+3'	Report		Stadium: La Cerámica; Attendance: 17,343; Referee: Santiago Jaime (Aragon)

10 November 2019 13	Athletic Bilbao	2–1	Levante	Bilbao
14:00 CET (UTC+01:00)	Muniain 57'; D. García (yellow card) 62'; R. García (yellow card) 62'; Capa (yellow card) 78', (goal) 88'	Report	Postigo 45+1'; Bardhi (yellow card) 49'; Vezo (yellow card) 75'	Stadium: San Mamés; Attendance: 33,364; Referee: Javier Alberola (Castile-La Mancha)

24 November 2019 14	Osasuna	1–2	Athletic Bilbao	Pamplona
14:00 CET (UTC+01:00)	Ávila (yellow card) 2', (goal) 76'; Brašanac (yellow card) 32'; Lillo (yellow card) 48'; R. García (yellow card) 57'	Report	Williams 21', (yellow card) 58'; Córdoba (yellow card) 52'; Berchiche (yellow card) 61'; Kodro 79'	Stadium: El Sadar; Attendance: 16,218; Referee: José Sánchez (Murcia)

1 December 2019 15	Athletic Bilbao	2–0	Granada	Bilbao
14:00 CET (UTC+01:00)	D. García (yellow card) 8'; R. García 41' (pen.), (yellow card) 81'; Córdoba (yellow card) 48'; Capa (yellow card) 50'; Sancet (yellow card) 53'; Berchiche 83'	Report	Duarte (yellow card) 36'; Silva (yellow card) 39'; Montoro (yellow card) 42'; Quini (yellow card) 90+1'	Stadium: San Mamés; Attendance: 38,083; Referee: Adrián Cordero (Cantabria)

8 December 2019 16	Real Betis	3–2	Athletic Bilbao	Seville
14:00 CET (UTC+01:00)	Joaquín 2', 11', 20'; Kaptoum (yellow card) 74'; Guardado (yellow card) 90+4'	Report	Williams 44' (pen.), (yellow card) 77'; Núñez (yellow card) 46'; Berchiche 75'; San José (yellow card) 86'; López (yellow card) 90+6'	Stadium: Benito Villamarín; Attendance: 45,322; Referee: Valentín Pizarro (Castile-La Mancha)

14 December 2019 17	Athletic Bilbao	0–0	Eibar	Bilbao
18:30 CET (UTC+01:00)	R. García (yellow card) 55'; San José (yellow card) 90'; Capa (yellow card) 90+2'	Report	Kike (yellow card) 86'; Dmitrović (yellow card) 88'; Tejero (yellow card) 90+4'	Stadium: San Mamés; Attendance: 43,384; Referee: Mario Melero (Andalusia)

22 December 2019 18	Real Madrid	0–0	Athletic Bilbao	Madrid
21:00 CET (UTC+01:00)	Ramos (yellow card) 87'	Report		Stadium: Santiago Bernabéu; Attendance: 71,219; Referee: Adrián Cordero (Cantabria)

3 January 2020 19	Sevilla	1–1	Athletic Bilbao	Seville
21:00 CET (UTC+01:00)	Carriço (yellow card) 31'; Núñez 60' (o.g.); Ocampos (yellow card) 77'	Report	Capa 15', (yellow card) 71'; López (yellow card) 84'; Núñez (yellow card) 85'; Martínez (yellow card) 87'	Stadium: Ramón Sánchez Pizjuán; Attendance: 38,014; Referee: José González (Castile and Léon)

19 January 2020 20	Athletic Bilbao	1–1	Celta Vigo	Bilbao
18:30 CET (UTC+01:00)	Capa (yellow card) 13'; López (yellow card) 19'; Berchiche (yellow card) 27'; R. García 76' (pen.); Martínez (yellow card) 83'	Report	Araujo (yellow card) 23'; Rafinha 56'; Blanco (yellow card) 73'; Kevin (yellow card) 90+3'	Stadium: San Mamés; Attendance: 41,549; Referee: David Medié (Catalonia)

25 January 2020 21	Espanyol	1–1	Athletic Bilbao	Cornellà de Llobregat
13:00 CET (UTC+01:00)	Sánchez (yellow card) 17'; Roca (yellow card) 56'; Espinosa (yellow card) 59'; De Tomás 63'	Report	Vesga (yellow card) 9'; Villalibre 12'	Stadium: RCDE; Attendance: 26,759; Referee: José Sánchez (Murcia)

2 February 2020 22	Athletic Bilbao	0–2	Getafe	Bilbao
16:00 CET (UTC+01:00)	Berchiche (yellow card) 63'; Martínez (yellow card) 86'	Report	Deyverson (yellow card) 12'; Suárez 36', (yellow card) 67'; Arambarri (yellow card) 40'; Mata 50' (pen.), (yellow card) 63'; Nyom (yellow card) 70'	Stadium: San Mamés; Attendance: 40,408; Referee: Javier Alberola (Castile-La Mancha)

9 February 2020 23	Real Sociedad	2–1	Athletic Bilbao	San Sebastián
14:00 CET (UTC+01:00)	Portu (yellow card) 63', (goal) 65'; Isak 83', (yellow card) 89'	Report	Capa (yellow card) 63'; Williams 71'; García (yellow card) 81'; Muniain (red card) 89'	Stadium: Anoeta; Attendance: 36,730; Referee: José Luis Munuera Montero (Andalusia)

16 February 2020 24	Athletic Bilbao	0–1	Osasuna	Bilbao
18:30 CET (UTC+01:00)	Vencedor (yellow card) 27'; San José (yellow card) 33'; Martínez (yellow card) 77'; Aduriz (yellow card) 80'	Report	Oier 29', (yellow card) 39'; Roncaglia (yellow card) 38'; Gallego (yellow card) 48'; Brašanac (yellow card) 55'	Stadium: San Mamés; Attendance: 44,286; Referee: Pablo González (Asturia)

23 February 2020 25	Alavés	2–1	Athletic Bilbao	Vitoria-Gasteiz
14:00 CET (UTC+01:00)	Pérez 28' (pen.); Navarro (yellow card) 31'; Aguirregabiria (yellow card) 33'; Ely (yellow card) 52', (goal) 90+1'; Pons (yellow card) 86'	Report	R. García 17'; Capa (yellow card) 20'; Núñez (yellow card) 26'; D. García (yellow card) 31'; Martínez (yellow card) 31'	Stadium: Mendizorrotza; Attendance: 15,749; Referee: Antonio Mateu (Valencia)

1 March 2020 26	Athletic Bilbao	1–0	Villarreal	Bilbao
14:00 CET (UTC+01:00)	Berchiche (yellow card) 21'; Capa (yellow card) 43'; R. García 56' (pen.), (yellow card) 90+2'; Córdoba (yellow card) 63'; Vesga (yellow card) 85'; Núñez (yellow card) 90+3'	Report	Cazorla (yellow card) 21'; Torres (yellow card) 54'; Iborra (yellow card) 55'; Zambo Anguissa (yellow card) 63'; Gerard (yellow card) 65'; Chukwueze (yellow card) 77'	Stadium: San Mamés; Attendance: 36,481; Referee: David Medié (Catalonia)

8 March 2020 27	Valladolid	1–4	Athletic Bilbao	Valladolid
14:00 CET (UTC+01:00)	Sandro 76'; Ben Arfa (yellow card) 90'	Report	López 4', (yellow card) 49'; R. García 24', (yellow card) 80'; Williams 87'; Córdoba 90+3'	Stadium: José Zorrilla; Attendance: 21,632; Referee: José Luis Munuera Montero (Andalusia)

14 June 2020 28	Athletic Bilbao	1–1	Atlético Madrid	Bilbao
14:00 CEST (UTC+02:00)	Muniain (yellow card) 6', (goal) 37'; Williams (yellow card) 45+1'; Martínez (yellow card) 84'	Report	Costa 39'	Stadium: San Mamés; Attendance: 0 Referee: José González (Castile and Léon)

17 June 2020 29	Eibar	2–2	Athletic Bilbao	Eibar
19:30 CEST (UTC+02:00)	Escalante (yellow card) 8'; Kike 19'; León (yellow card) 54'; Orellana 78' (pen.); Correa (yellow card) 84'	Report	R. García 8' (pen.); D. García (yellow card) 77'; Villalibre 81'; Vesga (yellow card) 90+7'	Stadium: Ipurua; Attendance: 0 Referee: Eduardo Prieto (Navarre)

20 June 2020 30	Athletic Bilbao	1–0	Real Betis	Bilbao
17:00 CEST (UTC+02:00)	Martínez 7', (yellow card) 84'; Berchiche (yellow card) 14'; Muniain (yellow card) 36'; D. García (yellow card) 90'	Report		Stadium: San Mamés; Attendance: 0 Referee: Valentín Pizarro (Castile-La Mancha)

23 June 2020 31	Barcelona	1–0	Athletic Bilbao	Barcelona
22:00 CEST (UTC+02:00)	Busquets (yellow card) 32'; Rakitić 71', (yellow card) 90+1'	Report	Núñez (yellow card) 62'	Stadium: Camp Nou; Attendance: 0 Referee: Jesús Gil (Extremadura)

27 June 2020 32	Athletic Bilbao	3–1	Mallorca	Bilbao
14:00 CEST (UTC+02:00)	R. García 16' (pen.), (yellow card) 76'; Sancet 24'; Villalibre 90'	Report	Budimir (yellow card) 66', (goal) 70' (pen.); Raíllo (yellow card) 82'	Stadium: San Mamés; Attendance: 0 Referee: Pablo González (Asturia)

1 July 2020 33	Valencia	0–2	Athletic Bilbao	Valencia
19:30 CEST (UTC+02:00)	Diakhaby (yellow card) 83'	Report	R. García 13', 47'	Stadium: Mestalla; Attendance: 0 Referee: Xavier Estrada (Catalonia)

5 July 2020 34	Athletic Bilbao	0–1	Real Madrid	Bilbao
14:00 CEST (UTC+02:00)	R. García (yellow card) 39'; D. García (yellow card) 73'; Muniain (yellow card) 90+5'; Berchiche (yellow card) 90+6'	Report	Ramos 73' (pen.), (yellow card) 90+1'; Casemiro (yellow card) 90+3'; Carvajal (yellow card) 90+6'	Stadium: San Mamés; Attendance: 0 Referee: José González (Castile and Léon)

9 July 2020 35	Athletic Bilbao	1–2	Sevilla	Bilbao
22:00 CEST (UTC+02:00)	Capa 28'; Núñez (yellow card) 31'; De Marcos (yellow card) 68'; García (yellow card) 90+3'	Report	Banega (yellow card) 44', (goal) 70'; Ocampos (yellow card) 65'; Munir 74'	Stadium: San Mamés; Attendance: 0 Referee: David Medié (Catalonia)

12 July 2020 36	Levante	1–2	Athletic Bilbao	La Nucia
17:00 CEST (UTC+02:00)	Bardhi 71'	Report	García 4', 45+1'; Martínez (yellow card) 17'	Stadium: Camilo Cano; Attendance: 0 Referee: Javier Alberola (Castile-La Mancha)

16 July 2020 37	Athletic Bilbao	0–2	Leganés	Bilbao
21:00 CEST (UTC+02:00)	Simón (red card) 22'; R. García (yellow card) 53'; Muniain (yellow card) 63'	Report	Eraso (yellow card) 43'; Bustinza (yellow card) 43'; Pérez (yellow card) 76'; Guerrero 79'; Assalé 90+4'	Stadium: San Mamés; Attendance: 0 Referee: Juan Martínez Munuera (Valencia)

19 July 2020 38	Granada	4–0	Athletic Bilbao	Granada
21:00 CEST (UTC+02:00)	Herrera (yellow card) 6'; Soldado 29'; Puertas 55'; Fernández 67'; Montoro 90+3'	Report	D. García (yellow card) 17'; Berchiche (yellow card) 75'	Stadium: Nuevo Los Cármenes; Attendance: 0 Referee: Carlos del Cerro (Madrid)

=== Copa del Rey ===
17 December 2019 First round	Intercity	0–3	Athletic Bilbao	Elche
21:00 CET (UTC+01:00)	Carrasco (yellow card) 84'	Report	Ibai 1'; Beñat 53'; Kodro 87' (pen.)	Stadium: Manuel Martínez Valero; Attendance: 4,971; Referee: Carlos del Cerro (Madrid)

11 January 2020 Second round	Sestao River	0–4	Athletic Bilbao	Sestao
19:00 CET (UTC+01:00)	Gago (yellow card) 6'; Villar (yellow card) 18'	Report	Villalibre 27', 70'; Berchiche 34', 90+1'	Stadium: Las Llanas; Attendance: 7,200; Referee: Adrián Cordero (Cantabria)

22 January 2020 Round of 32	Elche	1–1 (a.e.t.) (4–5 p)	Athletic Bilbao	Elche
19:00 CET (UTC+01:00)	Fidel 41'; Manuel (yellow card) 58'; Gil (yellow card) 94'	Report	Williams 5'; Berchiche (yellow card) 96'; Martínez (yellow card) 98'	Stadium: Manuel Martínez Valero; Attendance: 13,400; Referee: José Luis Munuera Montero (Andalusia)
	Penalties
	Manuel (penalty scored); Folch (penalty scored); Nino (penalty scored); Qasmi (penalty missed); Sánchez (penalty missed); Calvo (penalty scored); Tekio (penalty missed)		(penalty missed) R. García; (penalty scored) Muniain; (penalty missed) López; (penalty scored) Williams; (penalty scored) Villalibre; (penalty scored) Berchiche; (penalty scored) Vesga

28 January 2020 Round of 16	Tenerife	3–3 (a.e.t.) (2–4 p)	Athletic Bilbao	Santa Cruz de Tenerife
20:00 WET (UTC±00:00)	Joselu 8' (pen.), 21'; Undabarrena (yellow card) 22'; Muñoz (yellow card) 30'; Ruiz (yellow card) 41' (yellow-red card) 94'; Moore (yellow card) 92'; Gómez 105+1' (pen.); Ortolá (yellow card) 116'	Report	Herrerín (red card) 2'; Williams (yellow card) 7', (goal) 17', 54'; D. García (yellow card) 38'; R. García (yellow card) 77'; Berchiche (yellow card) 92', (goal) 118'; Martínez (yellow card) 99'	Stadium: Heliodoro Rodríguez López; Attendance: 17,482; Referee: Pablo González (Asturia)
	Penalties
	Sanz (penalty scored); Nahuel (penalty scored); Joselu (penalty missed); Moore (penalty missed)		(penalty scored) R. García; (penalty scored) Muniain; (penalty scored) Vesga; (penalty missed) Martínez; (penalty scored) Villalibre

6 February 2020 Quarter-finals	Athletic Bilbao	1–0	Barcelona	Bilbao
21:00 CET (UTC+01:00)	Yeray (yellow card) 44'; Vesga (yellow card) 53'; D. García (yellow card) 63'; Busquets 90+3' (o.g.)	Report	Semedo (yellow card) 6'; Messi (yellow card) 39'; Alba (yellow card) 40'; De Jong (yellow card) 57'; Piqué (yellow card) 72'; Arthur (yellow card) 81'	Stadium: San Mamés; Attendance: 49,154; Referee: Juan Martínez Munuera (Valencia)

Semi-finals

12 February 2020 First leg	Athletic Bilbao	1–0	Granada	Bilbao
21:00 CET (UTC+01:00)	D. García (yellow card) 16'; Williams (yellow card) 29'; Muniain 42'; Aduriz (yellow card) 67'	Report	Díaz (yellow card) 29'; Soldado (yellow card) 65'	Stadium: San Mamés; Attendance: 48,149; Referee: Alejandro Hernández (Canary Islands)

5 March 2020 Second leg	Granada	2–1 (2–2 (a) agg.)	Athletic Bilbao	Granada
21:00 CET (UTC+01:00)	Fernández 48'; Germán (yellow card) 50', (goal) 76'	Report	Yeray (yellow card) 40'; Vesga (yellow card) 73'; Berchiche 81'; Simón (yellow card) 90+3'	Stadium: Nuevo Los Cármenes; Attendance: 20,799; Referee: Carlos del Cerro (Madrid)

Final

3 April 2021 Final	Athletic Bilbao	0–1	Real Sociedad	Seville
21:30 CEST (UTC+02:00)	D. García (yellow card) 35'; Martínez (yellow card) 62'	Report	Oyarzabal 63' (pen.); Merino (yellow card) 71'	Stadium: La Cartuja; Attendance: 0 Referee: Xavier Estrada Fernández
