= 2018–19 Athletic Bilbao season =

Athletic Bilbao
2018–19 season
- President: Josu Urrutia (until 26 December); Aitor Elizegi (from 27 December)
- Head coach: Eduardo Berizzo (until 4 December); Gaizka Garitano (from 5 December)
- Stadium: San Mamés
- La Liga: 8th
- Copa del Rey: Round of 16
- Top goalscorer: League: Iñaki Williams (12); All: Iñaki Williams (14)
- Highest home attendance: 47,629 (vs Barcelona, 10 February 2019)
- Lowest home attendance: 25,360 (vs Huesca, 28 November 2018)
Home colours	Away colours	Third colours

The 2018–19 Athletic Bilbao season was the 120th in the club's history and the 88th in the top tier of Spanish football.

== Squad ==
According to the official website.

=== Player statistics ===
S	P	N	Name	League				Cup				Total			
S	P	N	Name	A	S	G	M	A	S	G	M	A	S	G	M
2	FW	(Bosnia and Herzegovina)	Kenan Kodro	0	11	1	151	0	0	0	0	0	11	1	151
3	DF	(Spain)	Unai Núñez	11	1	0	1063	2	0	0	180	13	1	0	1243
4	DF	(Spain)	Iñigo Martínez	33	0	0	2903	2	0	0	180	35	0	0	3083
5	DF	(Spain)	Yeray Álvarez	30	0	0	2614	2	0	0	180	32	0	0	2794
6	MF	(Spain)	Mikel San José	16	17	0	1716	3	1	1	276	19	18	1	1992
7	MF	(Spain)	Beñat Etxebarria	25	2	1	2045	2	0	1	148	27	2	2	2193
8	MF	(Spain)	Ander Iturraspe (vc)	1	2	0	97	2	0	0	163	3	2	0	260
9	FW	(Spain)	Iñaki Williams	36	2	12 (Note: Williams is credited with an additional goal against Levante by the club's website.)	3036	1	2	2	141	37	4	14	3177
10	MF	(Spain)	Iker Muniain (3rd c)	27	7	7	2385	1	2	0	149	28	9	7	2534
11	FW	(Spain)	Iñigo Córdoba	15	8	0	1322	2	1	0	165	17	9	0	1487
12	DF	(Spain)	Yuri Berchiche	35	0	2	3120	2	0	0	180	37	0	2	3300
13	GK	(Spain)	Iago Herrerín	31	0	0	2790	0	0	0	0	31	0	0	2790
14	FW	(Spain)	Markel Susaeta (c)	15	7	1	1380	3	0	0	249	18	7	1	1629
15	DF	(Spain)	Iñigo Lekue	2	2	0	210	0	0	0	0	2	2	0	210
16	MF	(Spain)	Dani García	29	0	0	2482	1	2	0	141	30	2	0	2623
17	MF	(Spain)	Mikel Rico	3	1	0	243	0	0	0	0	3	1	0	243
18	DF	(Spain)	Óscar de Marcos	27	2	1	2426	2	2	0	223	29	4	1	2649
19	FW	(Spain)	Ibai Gómez	6	8	0	577	1	0	0	90	7	8	0	667
20	FW	(Spain)	Aritz Aduriz	10	10	2	941	3	0	4	178	13	10	6	1119
21	DF	(Spain)	Ander Capa	16	8	0	1637	2	1	0	160	18	9	0	1797
22	MF	(Spain)	Raúl García	27	6	9	2379	1	0	0	90	28	6	9	2469
23	MF	(Spain)	Unai López	3	4	0	325	1	0	0	65	4	4	0	390
24	DF	(Spain)	Mikel Balenziaga	6	5	0	520	2	0	0	180	8	5	0	700
25	GK	(Spain)	Unai Simón	7	0	0	630	4	0	0	360	11	0	0	990
30	FW	(Spain)	Gorka Guruzeta	0	6	0	45	3	0	1	259	3	6	1	304
31	MF	(Spain)	Peru Nolaskoain	4	4	2	465	2	0	0	180	6	4	2	645
Player on loan in winter transfer window
2	MF	(Romania)	Cristian Ganea	1	0	0	50	0	1	0	17	1	1	0	67

=== Disciplinary record ===
S	P	N	Name	League			Cup			Total		
S	P	N	Name	Yellow card	Yellow-red card	Red card	Yellow card	Yellow-red card	Red card	Yellow card	Yellow-red card	Red card
2	FW	(Bosnia and Herzegovina)	Kenan Kodro	0	0	0	0	0	0	0	0	0
3	DF	(Spain)	Unai Núñez	4	0	0	0	0	0	4	0	0
4	DF	(Spain)	Iñigo Martínez	12	0	0	0	0	0	12	0	0
5	DF	(Spain)	Yeray Álvarez	10	0	0	0	0	0	10	0	0
6	MF	(Spain)	Mikel San José	7	0	0	2	0	0	9	0	0
7	MF	(Spain)	Beñat Etxebarria	8	0	0	0	0	0	8	0	0
8	MF	(Spain)	Ander Iturraspe	1	0	0	0	0	0	1	0	0
9	FW	(Spain)	Iñaki Williams	3	0	0	0	0	0	3	0	0
10	MF	(Spain)	Iker Muniain	6	0	0	1	0	0	7	0	0
11	FW	(Spain)	Iñigo Córdoba	3	0	0	0	0	0	3	0	0
12	DF	(Spain)	Yuri Berchiche	9	0	1	0	0	0	9	0	1
13	GK	(Spain)	Iago Herrerín	1	0	0	0	0	0	1	0	0
14	FW	(Spain)	Markel Susaeta	2	1	0	0	0	0	2	1	0
15	DF	(Spain)	Iñigo Lekue	1	0	0	0	0	0	1	0	0
16	MF	(Spain)	Dani García	13	0	0	0	0	0	13	0	0
17	MF	(Spain)	Mikel Rico	0	0	0	0	0	0	0	0	0
18	DF	(Spain)	Óscar de Marcos	6	1	1	0	0	0	6	1	1
19	FW	(Spain)	Ibai Gómez	0	0	0	0	0	0	0	0	0
20	FW	(Spain)	Aritz Aduriz	4	0	0	0	0	0	4	0	0
21	DF	(Spain)	Ander Capa	9	0	0	0	0	0	9	0	0
22	MF	(Spain)	Raúl García	13	0	0	0	0	0	13	0	0
23	MF	(Spain)	Unai López	1	0	0	0	0	0	1	0	0
24	DF	(Spain)	Mikel Balenziaga	0	0	0	0	0	0	0	0	0
25	GK	(Spain)	Unai Simón	2	0	0	0	0	0	2	0	0
30	FW	(Spain)	Gorka Guruzeta	0	0	0	0	0	0	0	0	0
31	MF	(Spain)	Peru Nolaskoain	2	0	1	0	0	0	2	0	1
Player on loan in winter transfer window
2	MF	(Romania)	Cristian Ganea	0	0	0	0	0	0	0	0	0

=== From the youth system ===
Note: Flags indicate national team as defined under FIFA eligibility rules; some limited exceptions apply. Players may hold more than one non-FIFA nationality.

No.	Pos.	Nation	Player
25	GK	ESP	Unai Simón
30	FW	ESP	Gorka Guruzeta
31	MF	ESP	Peru Nolaskoain

=== Transfer ===
In

Date	Name	Moving from	Fee	Source
30 June 2018	(Spain) Unai López	(Spain) Rayo Vallecano	Loan return	
1 July 2018	(Spain) Ander Capa	(Spain) Eibar	€3M	
1 July 2018	(Romania) Cristian Ganea	(Romania) Viitorul Constanța	Undisclosed	
1 July 2018	(Spain) Dani García	(Spain) Eibar	Free	
2 July 2018	(Spain) Yuri Berchiche	(France) Paris Saint-Germain	€19M	
10 January 2019	(Spain) Ibai Gómez	(Spain) Alavés	Undisclosed	
31 January 2019	(Bosnia and Herzegovina) Kenan Kodro	(Denmark) Copenhagen	Undisclosed	

Out

Date	Name	Moving to	Fee	Source
28 June 2018	(Spain) Enric Saborit	(Israel) Maccabi Tel Aviv	Free	
30 June 2018	(Spain) Kike Sola	Retired		
4 July 2018	(Spain) Mikel Vesga	(Spain) Leganés	Loan	
23 July 2018	(Spain) Xabier Etxeita	(Spain) Huesca	Loan	
2 August 2018	(Spain) Óscar Gil	(Spain) Racing Santander	Free	
8 August 2018	(Spain) Kepa Arrizabalaga	(England) Chelsea	£71.6M	
18 August 2018	(Spain) Andoni López	(Spain) Almería	Loan	
31 August 2018	(Spain) Sabin Merino	(Spain) Leganés	Loan	
9 January 2019	(Romania) Cristian Ganea	(Spain) Numancia	Loan	

== Staff ==
According to the official website:

Position	Until 4 December 2018	Since 5 December 2018
Head coach	Eduardo Berizzo	Gaizka Garitano
Assistant coach(es)	Ernesto Marcucci, Roberto Bonano, Mariano Uglessich	Patxi Ferreira
Physical coach	Pablo Fernández	Juan Ángel Iribarren
Goalkeeper coach	Carlos Kisluk	Aitor Iru

Position	Name
Technical coach	Alberto Iglesias
Representative	Andoni Imaz
Head of medical service	Josean Lekue
Doctor	Paco Angulo
Nurses	Juanma Ipiña, Álvaro Campa
Physiotherapists	Beñat Azula, Isusko Ortuzar
Regenerative therapist	Xabier Clemente
Materials managers	Jon Eskalza, Iker López

== Pre-season and friendlies ==
19 July 2018 Friendly	Amorebieta	0–3	Athletic Bilbao	Amorebieta-Etxano, Spain
18:00 CEST (UTC+02:00)		Report	U. López 11'; Nolaskoain 77'; Sancet 79'	Stadium: Urritxe; Referee: Eduardo Prieto

22 July 2018 Friendly	Barakaldo	0–5	Athletic Bilbao	Barakaldo, Spain
11:30 CEST (UTC+02:00)		Report	Yeray 20'; Williams 21'; Guruzeta 25'; Aduriz 29'; Muniain 31'	Stadium: Lasesarre; Referee: Alberto Undiano

25 July 2018 Friendly	ADO Den Haag	3–2	Athletic Bilbao	De Lutte, Netherlands
19:00 CEST (UTC+02:00)	Becker 30'; Falkenburg 49'; El Khayati 51'	Report	Aduriz 17'; Sabin 78'	Stadium: Sportpark De Stockakker; Referee: Smeenge Petrick

28 July 2018 Friendly	Fulham	3–1	Athletic Bilbao	Duisburg, Germany
17:00 CEST (UTC+02:00)	Kebano 35'; Kamara 42'; Yeray 45' (o.g.)	Report	Aduriz 5'	Stadium: Schauinsland-Reisen-Arena; Referee: Thorben Siewer

28 July 2018 Friendly	MSV Duisburg	1–1	Athletic Bilbao	Duisburg, Germany
18:00 CEST (UTC+02:00)	Souza 15'	Report	Rico 8'	Stadium: Schauinsland-Reisen-Arena; Referee: Thorben Siewer

4 August 2018 Euskal Herriko Futbol Txapelketa	Real Sociedad	0–1	Athletic Bilbao	Irun, Spain
18:15 CEST (UTC+02:00)		Report	Williams 47'	Stadium: Gal; Referee: Aitor Gorostegui

5 August 2018 Friendly	Fiorentina	0–0 (3–5 p)	Athletic Bilbao	Mainz, Germany
13:00 CEST (UTC+02:00)		Report		Stadium: Opel Arena; Referee: Patrick Alt
	Penalties
	Eysseric (penalty scored); Gerson (penalty scored); Sottil (penalty scored); Graiciar (penalty missed)		(penalty scored) Beñat; (penalty scored) Balenziaga; (penalty scored) Iturraspe; (penalty scored) San José; (penalty scored) Sabin

5 August 2018 Friendly	Mainz 05	0–0 (5–3 p)	Athletic Bilbao	Mainz, Germany
14:00 CEST (UTC+02:00)		Report		Stadium: Opel Arena; Referee: Tim Gerach
	Penalties
	Mateta (penalty scored); Baku (penalty scored); Quaison (penalty scored); Gbamin (penalty scored); Brosinski (penalty scored)		(penalty scored) Beñat; (penalty scored) Williams; (penalty scored) Iturraspe; (penalty missed) Ganea

11 August 2018 Friendly	Hannover 96	2–0	Athletic Bilbao	Hanover, Germany
15:30 CEST (UTC+02:00)	Füllkrug 23'; Asano 27'	Report		Stadium: HDI Arena; Referee: Smeenge Petrick

12 August 2018 Friendly	Augsburg	0–1	Athletic Bilbao	Augsburg, Germany
15:30 CEST (UTC+02:00)		Report	López 72'	Stadium: WWK Arena; Referee: Benjamin Cortus

6 September 2018 Friendly	Athletic Bilbao	3–1	Valladolid	Lezama, Spain
18:30 CEST (UTC+02:00)	Williams 41'; San José 61'; López 69'	Report	Keko 35'	Stadium: Lezama; Referee: Jon González

11 October 2018 Friendly	Athletic Bilbao	3–0	Venezuela U-20	Lezama, Spain
11:00 CEST (UTC+02:00)	Guruzeta 1'; López 12'; García 37' (pen.)	Report		Stadium: Lezama; Referee: Ekaitz García

14 November 2018 Teresa Herrera Trophy	Deportivo La Coruña	2–2 (1–4 p)	Athletic Bilbao	A Coruña, Spain
20:45 CET (UTC+01:00)	Santos 17'; Saúl 86'	Report	Córdoba 10'; Aduriz 50'	Stadium: Abanca-Riazor; Referee: David Pérez
	Penalties
	Mosquera (penalty missed); Bóveda (penalty missed); Montiel (penalty scored)		(penalty scored) Aduriz; (penalty scored) Williams; (penalty scored) San José; (penalty scored) Iturraspe

21 March 2019 Friendly	Athletic Bilbao	3–3	Eibar	Lezama, Spain
11:00 CET (UTC+01:00)	Nolaskoain 38'; Guruzeta 47'; De Marcos 63'	Report	Milla 6'; Kike 22'; Cardona 51'	Stadium: Lezama; Referee: Ekaitz García

== Competitions ==
=== Overview ===
Competition	First match	Last match	Starting round	Final position	Record							
Competition	First match	Last match	Starting round	Final position	Pld	W	D	L	GF	GA	GD	Win %
La Liga	20 August 2018	18 May 2019	Matchday 1	8th	38	13	14	11	41	45	−4	34.21
Copa del Rey	28 November 2018	16 January 2019	Round of 32	Round of 16	4	3	0	1	10	3	+7	75.00
Total					42	16	14	12	51	48	+3	38.10

Source: Competitions

=== La Liga ===
League table

Pos	Team	Pld	W	D	L	GF	GA	GD	Pts	Qualification or relegation
6	Sevilla	38	17	8	13	62	47	+15	59 (Note: Getafe finished ahead of Sevilla on head-to-head points: Sevilla 0–2 Getafe, Getafe 3–0 Sevilla.)	Qualification for the Europa League group stage (Note: Since the winners of the 2018–19 Copa del Rey, Valencia, qualified for European competition based on league position, the spot awarded to the cup winners (Europa League group stage) was passed to the sixth-placed team and the spot awarded to the sixth-placed team (Europa League second qualifying round) was passed to the seventh-placed team.)
7	Espanyol	38	14	11	13	48	50	−2	53 (Note: Espanyol finished ahead of Athletic Bilbao on head-to-head points: Espanyol 1–0 Athletic Bilbao, Athletic Bilbao 1–1 Espanyol.)	Qualification for the Europa League second qualifying round
8	Athletic Bilbao	38	13	14	11	41	45	−4	53	
9	Real Sociedad	38	13	11	14	45	46	−1	50 (Note: Real Sociedad finished ahead of Real Betis and Alavés on head-to-head points: Real Sociedad 6, Real Betis 5, Alavés 5. Real Betis finished ahead of Alavés on goal difference: Real Betis –8, Alavés –11.)	
10	Real Betis	38	14	8	16	44	52	−8	50	

Source: La Liga, Soccerway
Rules for classification: 1) Points; 2) Head-to-head points; 3) Head-to-head goal difference; 4) Goal difference; 5) Goals scored; 6) Fair-play points (Note: Head-to-head record is used only after all the matches between the teams in question have been played)

==== Results summary ====
Overall								Home						Away					
Pld	W	D	L	GF	GA	GD	Pts	W	D	L	GF	GA	GD	W	D	L	GF	GA	GD
38	13	14	11	41	45	−4	53	9	8	2	26	19	+7	4	6	9	15	26	−11

Source: LaLiga

Result round by round

Round	1	2	3	4	5	6	7	8	9	10	11	12	13	14	15	16	17	18	19	20	21	22	23	24	25	26	27	28	29	30	31	32	33	34	35	36	37	38
Ground	H	H	A	H	A	H	A	H	A	H	A	A	H	A	H	A	H	A	H	A	H	A	H	A	H	A	H	H	A	H	A	H	A	A	H	A	H	A
Result	W	D	D	D	D	L	D	L	D	D	L	L	D	L	W	D	D	W	W	D	W	L	D	W	W	L	D	W	W	W	L	W	L	W	D	L	W	L
Position	5	5	6	8	12	15	15	17	17	16	17	17	18	18	18	18	18	17	15	14	11	12	13	11	10	12	12	9	8	8	8	7	7	7	7	7	7	8

Source: LaLiga

==== Matches ====
20 August 2018 1	Athletic Bilbao	2–1	Leganés	Bilbao
22:00 CEST (UTC+02:00)	Yeray (yellow card) 17'; Nolaskoain 27'; Berchiche (yellow card) 53'; R. García (yellow card) 78'; Muniain 90+3' (yellow card) 90+4'	Report	Silva 33' (yellow card) 81'; García (yellow card) 41'; Carrillo (yellow card) 55'; Gumbau (yellow card) 76'; Santos (yellow card) 88'	Stadium: San Mamés; Attendance: 38,575; Referee: Adrián Cordero (Cantabria)

27 August 2018 2	Athletic Bilbao	2–2	Huesca	Bilbao
22:00 CEST (UTC+02:00)	D. García (yellow card) 42'; Susaeta 47'; Berchiche 63'; Iturraspe (yellow card) 73'	Report	Miramón 71'; Pulido (yellow card) 72'; Ávila 87'; Musto (yellow card) 90+2'	Stadium: San Mamés; Attendance: 36,900; Referee: Javier Alberola (Castile-La Mancha)

15 September 2018 4	Athletic Bilbao	1–1	Real Madrid	Bilbao
20:45 CEST (UTC+02:00)	Muniain 32'; Yeray (yellow card) 45'; D. García (yellow card) 60'; Capa (yellow card) 68'; Berchiche (yellow card) 72'; Beñat (yellow card) 78'; Simón (yellow card) 90+2'	Report	Isco 63'; Carvajal (yellow card) 85'; Vázquez (yellow card) 87'	Stadium: San Mamés; Attendance: 46,551; Referee: José González (Castile and Léon)

23 September 2018 5	Real Betis	2–2	Athletic Bilbao	Seville
18:30 CEST (UTC+02:00)	Bartra 51'; Canales (yellow card) 53' (goal) 68'; Sidnei (yellow card) 70'	Report	Williams 7'; R. García 18'; Susaeta (yellow card) 38' (yellow-red card) 45'; Yeray (yellow card) 40'; Beñat (yellow card) 45'; Berchiche (yellow card) 50'; Martínez (yellow card) 87'; Simón (yellow card) 90+3'	Stadium: Benito Villamarín; Attendance: 50,426; Referee: Xavier Estrada (Catalonia)

26 September 2018 6	Athletic Bilbao	0–3	Villarreal	Bilbao
20:00 CEST (UTC+02:00)	De Marcos (yellow card) 73'	Report	Fornals 65'; Ruiz (yellow card) 76'; Funes Mori 80'; Toko Ekambi 89'	Stadium: San Mamés; Attendance: 39,869; Referee: Carlos del Cerro (Madrid)

29 September 2018 7	Barcelona	1–1	Athletic Bilbao	Barcelona
16:15 CEST (UTC+02:00)	Rakitić (yellow card) 78'; Munir 84'; Busquets (yellow card) 89'; Messi (yellow card) 90+4'	Report	De Marcos 41'; Yeray (yellow card) 48'; Nolaskoain (yellow card) 90'; D. García (yellow card) 90'	Stadium: Camp Nou; Attendance: 75,851; Referee: Santiago Jaime (Aragon)

5 October 2018 8	Athletic Bilbao	1–3	Real Sociedad	Bilbao
21:00 CEST (UTC+02:00)	De Marcos (yellow card) 19'; Susaeta (yellow card) 26'; Martínez (yellow card) 29'; Williams (yellow card) 31'; Muniain 32'; D. García (yellow card) 39'; R. García (yellow card) 67'	Report	Oyarzabal 30' (pen.), 74' (pen.); Zubeldia (yellow card) 38'; Sangalli 47'; Moyá (yellow card) 57'; Zurutuza (yellow card) 70'; Illarramendi (yellow card) 83'; Bautista (yellow card) 90+2'	Stadium: San Mamés; Attendance: 46,860; Referee: Alejandro Hernández (Canary Islands)

21 October 2018 9	Eibar	1–1	Athletic Bilbao	Eibar
16:15 CEST (UTC+02:00)	Charles 17' (pen.); Orellana (yellow card) 23'; Enrich (yellow card) 75'	Report	Williams 21'; López (yellow card) 28'; De Marcos (yellow card) 65'; R. García (yellow card) 87'	Stadium: Ipurua; Attendance: 6,519; Referee: Jesús Gil (Extremadura)

24 October 2018 3	Rayo Vallecano	1–1	Athletic Bilbao	Madrid
19:00 CEST (UTC+02:00)	Pozo 23'; Imbula (yellow card) 59'	Report	R. García (yellow card) 53'; Muniain 66'	Stadium: Vallecas; Attendance: 11,850; Referee: Guillermo Cuadra Fernández (Madrid)

27 October 2018 10	Athletic Bilbao	0–0	Valencia	Bilbao
16:15 CEST (UTC+02:00)	Capa (yellow card) 20'; Berchiche (yellow card) 77'	Report	Vezo (yellow card) 16'; Soler (yellow card) 35'; Batshuayi (yellow card) 38'; Wass (yellow card) 74'; Gayà (yellow card) 90+2'	Stadium: San Mamés; Attendance: 39,471; Referee: Alberto Undiano (Navarre)

5 November 2018 11	Espanyol	1–0	Athletic Bilbao	Cornellà de Llobregat
21:00 CET (UTC+01:00)	Iglesias 41'; Granero (yellow card) 66'	Report	San José (yellow card) 20'; D. García (yellow card) 48'; Núñez (yellow card) 76'	Stadium: RCDE; Attendance: 14,209; Referee: Pablo González (Asturia)

10 November 2018 12	Atlético Madrid	3–2	Athletic Bilbao	Madrid
18:30 CET (UTC+01:00)	Costa (yellow card) 38'; Thomas 61'; Kalinić (yellow card) 66'; Adán (yellow card) 66'; Vitolo (yellow card) 66'; Rodri 80'; Godín 90+1'	Report	Williams 36', 64'; Beñat (yellow card) 49'; San José (yellow card) 82'; De Marcos (yellow card) 86'; Martínez (yellow card) 90+4'; Berchiche (yellow card) 90+5' (red card) 90+5'	Stadium: Wanda Metropolitano; Attendance: 59,029; Referee: José Sánchez (Murcia)

25 November 2018 13	Athletic Bilbao	1–1	Getafe	Bilbao
12:00 CET (UTC+01:00)	Núñez (yellow card) 25'; Nolaskoain 67' (yellow card) 73'; Martínez (yellow card) 80'; Aduriz (yellow card) 90+4'; De Marcos (yellow card) 90+4'	Report	Arambarri (yellow card) 27'; Amath (yellow card) 29'; Cabrera (yellow card) 32'; Mata 77' (yellow card) 90+5'	Stadium: San Mamés; Attendance: 40,121; Referee: Ignacio Iglesias (Galicia)

3 December 2018 14	Levante	3–0	Athletic Bilbao	Valencia
21:00 CET (UTC+01:00)	Campaña (yellow card) 24' (goal) 59'; Roger (yellow card) 41' (goal) 69'; Chema 45'; Rochina (yellow card) 60'	Report	Núñez (yellow card) 40'; Aduriz (yellow card) 40'; Martínez (yellow card) 65'; Nolaskoain (red card) 73'; Susaeta (yellow card) 84'; Muniain (yellow card) 90+4'	Stadium: Ciutat de València; Attendance: 19,928; Referee: Santiago Jaime (Aragon)

10 December 2018 15	Athletic Bilbao	1–0	Girona	Bilbao
21:00 CET (UTC+01:00)	Beñat (yellow card) 55'; Núñez (yellow card) 78'; Capa (yellow card) 81'; Aduriz 90+2' (pen.)	Report	Juanpe (yellow card) 83'	Stadium: San Mamés; Attendance: 34,060; Referee: Eduardo Prieto (Navarre)

17 December 2018 16	Alavés	0–0	Athletic Bilbao	Vitoria-Gasteiz
21:00 CET (UTC+01:00)	Duarte (yellow card) 58'; Borja (yellow card) 87'	Report	D. García (yellow card) 14'; Martínez (yellow card) 48'	Stadium: Mendizorrotza; Attendance: 19,349; Referee: Antonio Mateu (Valencia)

22 December 2018 17	Athletic Bilbao	1–1	Valladolid	Bilbao
20:45 CET (UTC+01:00)	D. García (yellow card) 24'; Aduriz 45' (pen.); Yeray (yellow card) 61'; R. García (yellow card) 78'	Report	Míchel (yellow card) 32'; Keko (yellow card) 44'; Plano 90+2'	Stadium: San Mamés; Attendance: 42,880; Referee: José Sánchez (Murcia)

7 January 2019 18	Celta Vigo	1–2	Athletic Bilbao	Vigo
21:00 CET (UTC+01:00)	Yokuşlu (yellow card) 25'; Beltrán 45'; Mallo (yellow card) 67'	Report	Williams (yellow card) 15' (goal) 54'; Muniain 19' (yellow card) 90+2'; Córdoba (yellow card) 40'; D. García (yellow card) 58'; Aduriz (yellow card) 85'	Stadium: Abanca-Balaídos; Attendance: 13,266; Referee: Juan Martínez Munuera (Valencia)

13 January 2019 19	Athletic Bilbao	2–0	Sevilla	Bilbao
16:15 CET (UTC+01:00)	Williams 23', 84'; García (yellow card) 64'; Muniain (yellow card) 76'; Herrerín (yellow card) 81'; Martínez (yellow card) 90'	Report	Mesa (yellow card) 26'; Escudero (yellow card) 28'; Gnagnon (yellow card) 90+3'	Stadium: San Mamés; Attendance: 41,479; Referee: Pablo González (Asturia)

20 January 2019 20	Villarreal	1–1	Athletic Bilbao	Villarreal
16:15 CET (UTC+01:00)	Funes Mori (yellow card) 37'; Iborra (yellow card) 54'; Mario (yellow card) 57'; Álvaro (yellow card) 62'; Toko Ekambi 71'	Report	Costa 18' (o.g.); Beñat (yellow card) 40'	Stadium: La Cerámica; Attendance: 16,910; Referee: Alberto Undiano (Navarre)

27 January 2019 21	Athletic Bilbao	1–0	Real Betis	Bilbao
18:30 CET (UTC+01:00)	Muniain 21'; Berchiche (yellow card) 26'; San José (yellow card) 31'; Yeray (yellow card) 82'; De Marcos (red card) 84'; Capa (yellow card) 87'	Report	Sidnei (yellow card) 24'; Loren (yellow card) 50'	Stadium: San Mamés; Attendance: 40,390; Referee: Xavier Estrada (Catalonia)

2 February 2019 22	Real Sociedad	2–1	Athletic Bilbao	San Sebastián
16:15 CET (UTC+01:00)	Oyarzabal 16'; Willian José 45'; Navas (yellow card) 81'	Report	Capa (yellow card) 55'; R. García 82'	Stadium: Anoeta; Attendance: 27,073; Referee: Antonio Mateu (Valencia)

10 February 2019 23	Athletic Bilbao	0–0	Barcelona	Bilbao
20:45 CET (UTC+01:00)	D. García (yellow card) 52'; De Marcos (yellow card) 68' (yellow-red card) 90+1'; Yeray (yellow card) 90+1'	Report	Lenglet (yellow card) 72'; Busquets (yellow card) 78'	Stadium: San Mamés; Attendance: 47,629; Referee: Carlos del Cerro (Madrid)

18 February 2019 24	Huesca	0–1	Athletic Bilbao	Huesca
21:00 CET (UTC+01:00)	Herrera (yellow card) 38'; Miramón (yellow card) 41'; Gallego (yellow card) 42'; Diéguez (yellow card) 68'; Gómez (yellow card) 73'	Report	García 19' (pen.); Capa (yellow card) 32'	Stadium: El Alcoraz; Attendance: 6,742; Referee: José Sánchez (Murcia)

23 February 2019 25	Athletic Bilbao	1–0	Eibar	Bilbao
20:45 CET (UTC+01:00)	R. García 1'; Yeray (yellow card) 13'; Beñat (yellow card) 55'; Martínez (yellow card) 83'	Report	Diop (yellow card) 45'; Oliveira (yellow card) 58'; Charles (yellow card) 77'; Arbilla (yellow card) 87'	Stadium: San Mamés; Attendance: 43,514; Referee: Mario Melero (Andalusia)

3 March 2019 26	Valencia	2–0	Athletic Bilbao	Valencia
20:45 CET (UTC+01:00)	Rodrigo 49'; Gameiro 89'	Report	R. García (yellow card) 14'; Yeray (yellow card) 53'; Martínez (yellow card) 70'	Stadium: Mestalla; Attendance: 39,119; Referee: David Medié (Catalonia)

8 March 2019 27	Athletic Bilbao	1–1	Espanyol	Bilbao
21:00 CET (UTC+01:00)	D. García (yellow card) 36'; Berchiche (yellow card) 45'; Martínez (yellow card) 78'; R. García 80'	Report	Ferreyra 9' (yellow card) 21'; Hermoso (yellow card) 24'; Melendo (yellow card) 45'; Granero (yellow card) 73'; Sánchez (yellow card) 87'	Stadium: San Mamés; Attendance: 38,779; Referee: Pablo González (Asturia)

16 March 2019 28	Athletic Bilbao	2–0	Atlético Madrid	Bilbao
18:30 CET (UTC+01:00)	R. García (yellow card) 37'; Williams 73'; San José (yellow card) 77'; Yeray (yellow card) 82'; Kodro 85'	Report	Rodri (yellow card) 45'	Stadium: San Mamés; Attendance: 39,659; Referee: Santiago Jaime (Aragon)

29 March 2019 29	Girona	1–2	Athletic Bilbao	Girona
21:00 CET (UTC+01:00)	Stuani 37'; Juanpe (yellow card) 72'; Portu (yellow card) 80'	Report	Capa (yellow card) 39'; Williams 53'; R. García 59' (yellow card) 63'; Martínez (yellow card) 80'; Beñat (yellow card) 84'	Stadium: Montilivi; Attendance: 10,516; Referee: José Sánchez (Murcia)

3 April 2019 30	Athletic Bilbao	3–2	Levante	Bilbao
19:30 CEST (UTC+02:00)	Berchiche 5' (yellow card) 77'; García (yellow card) 6'; Fernández 27' (o.g.); Muniain (yellow card) 78' (goal) 90+3' (pen.)	Report	Morales (yellow card) 4'; Vezo (yellow card) 43'; Postigo (yellow card) 45'; Roger 51' (pen.) (yellow card) 77'; Cabaco (yellow card) 85' (yellow-red card) 90+6' (goal) 89'; Simon (yellow card) 90+1'	Stadium: San Mamés; Attendance: 36,450; Referee: José Luis Munuera Montero (Andalusia)

7 April 2019 31	Getafe	1–0	Athletic Bilbao	Getafe
14:00 CEST (UTC+02:00)	Suárez (yellow card) 32'; Ángel (yellow card) 60' (goal) 78'	Report	San José (yellow card) 11'	Stadium: Coliseum Alfonso Pérez; Attendance: 11,447; Referee: José González (Castile and Léon)

14 April 2019 32	Athletic Bilbao	3–2	Rayo Vallecano	Bilbao
14:00 CEST (UTC+02:00)	Williams 2', 50' (yellow card) 90+5'; R. García 72'	Report	Moreno 45'; Advíncula (yellow card) 49' (yellow-red card) 52'; Ba (yellow card) 68'; De Tomás 85'	Stadium: San Mamés; Attendance: 38,864; Referee: Juan Martínez Munuera (Valencia)

21 April 2019 33	Real Madrid	3–0	Athletic Bilbao	Madrid
16:15 CEST (UTC+02:00)	Benzema 47', 76', 90'; Kroos (yellow card) 69'; Navas (yellow card) 82'	Report	Córdoba (yellow card) 3'; Berchiche (yellow card) 15'; R. García (yellow card) 45'; Martínez (yellow card) 53'	Stadium: Santiago Bernabéu; Attendance: 60,556; Referee: Mario Melero (Andalusia)

24 April 2019 34	Leganés	0–1	Athletic Bilbao	Leganés
20:30 CEST (UTC+02:00)	Tarín (yellow card) 39'	Report	En-Nesyri 43' (o.g.); Córdoba (yellow card) 44'; Lekue (yellow card) 90+3'	Stadium: Butarque; Attendance: 4,155; Referee: Ignacio Iglesias (Galicia)

27 April 2019 35	Athletic Bilbao	1–1	Alavés	Bilbao
13:00 CEST (UTC+02:00)	García (yellow card) 34'; Beñat 41'; San José (yellow card) 45'	Report	Laguardia (yellow card) 32'; Vigaray (yellow card) 44'; Borja 45'	Stadium: San Mamés; Attendance: 40,576; Referee: Jesús Gil (Extremadura)

5 May 2019 36	Valladolid	1–0	Athletic Bilbao	Valladolid
18:30 CEST (UTC+02:00)	Plano (yellow card) 11'; Rubio 21'; Míchel (yellow card) 35'; Alcaraz (yellow card) 41'; B. Fernández (yellow card) 50'; Toni (yellow card) 84'	Report	Capa (yellow card) 30'; D. García (yellow card) 30'; San José (yellow card) 55'; Aduriz (yellow card) 90+1'; De Marcos (yellow card) 90+5'	Stadium: José Zorrilla; Attendance: 22,151; Referee: Antonio Mateu (Valencia)

12 May 2019 37	Athletic Bilbao	3–1	Celta Vigo	Bilbao
18:30 CEST (UTC+02:00)	R. García 16' (pen.), 17' (yellow card) 89'; Williams 40'; Beñat (yellow card) 45'; Muniain (yellow card) 61'; Capa (yellow card) 87'	Report	Boudebouz (yellow card) 24'; Araujo (yellow card) 36'; Hoedt (yellow card) 64'; Aspas 89' (pen.)	Stadium: San Mamés; Attendance: 42,494; Referee: Xavier Estrada (Catalonia)

18 May 2019 38	Sevilla	2–0	Athletic Bilbao	Seville
16:15 CEST (UTC+02:00)	Rog (yellow card) 36'; Ben Yedder 44'; Gnagnon (yellow card) 60'; Navas (yellow card) 60'; Mercado (yellow card) 65'; Munir 90+2'	Report	D. García (yellow card) 19'; R. García (yellow card) 29'	Stadium: Ramón Sánchez Pizjuán; Attendance: 28,134; Referee: José Sánchez (Murcia)

=== Copa del Rey ===
Round of 32

28 November 2018 First leg	Athletic Bilbao	4–0	Huesca	Bilbao
20:45 CET (UTC+01:00)	Aduriz 10', 32'; Insua 27' (o.g.); Beñat 55'; San José (yellow card) 59'	Report	Ávila (yellow card) 9'; Sastre (yellow card) 22'; Brežančić (yellow card) 41'	Stadium: San Mamés; Attendance: 25,360; Referee: José González (Castile and Léon)

6 December 2018 Second leg	Huesca	0–4 (0–8 agg.)	Athletic Bilbao	Huesca
18:30 CET (UTC+01:00)	Musto (yellow card) 27'; Ávila (yellow card) 72'	Report	Aduriz 37', 58'; Williams 80', 90+2'	Stadium: El Alcoraz; Attendance: 5,561; Referee: Carlos del Cerro (Madrid)

Round of 16

10 January 2019 First leg	Athletic Bilbao	1–3	Sevilla	Bilbao
19:30 CET (UTC+01:00)	San José (yellow card) 36' (goal) 49'	Report	Nolito 6'; Mesa (yellow card) 37'; Silva 53'; Vázquez (yellow card) 61'; Ben Yedder 77'	Stadium: San Mamés; Attendance: 33,847; Referee: Carlos del Cerro (Madrid)

16 January 2019 Second leg	Sevilla	0–1 (3–2 agg.)	Athletic Bilbao	Seville
20:30 CET (UTC+01:00)	Carriço (yellow card) 89'	Report	Guruzeta 77'; Muniain (yellow card) 90+4'	Stadium: Ramón Sánchez Pizjuán; Attendance: 26,456; Referee: José González (Castile and Léon)
