= 2016–17 Athletic Bilbao season =

Athletic Bilbao
2016–17 season
- President: Josu Urrutia
- Head coach: Ernesto Valverde
- Stadium: San Mamés
- La Liga: 7th
- Copa del Rey: Round of 16
- UEFA Europa League: Round of 32
- Top goalscorer: League: Aritz Aduriz (16); All: Aritz Aduriz (24)
- Highest home attendance: 49,164 (vs Real Madrid, 18 March 2017)
- Lowest home attendance: 29,633 (vs Racing Santander, 22 December 2016)
Home colours	Away colours	Third colours

The 2016–17 season was the 118th in Athletic Club’s history and the 86th in the top tier.

== Squad ==
According to the official website.

=== Player statistics ===
S	P	N	Name	League				Cup				Europe				Total			
S	P	N	Name	A	S	G	M	A	S	G	M	A	S	G	M	A	S	G	M
1	GK	(Spain)	Gorka Iraizoz (c)	15	1	0	1404	4	0	0	360	3	0	0	270	22	1	0	2034
2	DF	(Spain)	Eneko Bóveda	18	1	0	1559	3	0	0	252	0	1	0	29	21	2	0	1840
3	DF	(Spain)	Gorka Elustondo	1	1	0	104	1	2	0	141	0	1	0	10	2	4	0	255
4	DF	(France)	Aymeric Laporte	33	0	2	2865	4	0	0	360	6	0	0	540	43	0	2	3765
5	MF	(Spain)	Javier Eraso	4	3	0	377	2	2	0	220	1	1	0	76	7	6	0	673
6	MF	(Spain)	Mikel San José	30	5	4	2700	3	0	0	270	4	2	0	414	37	7	4	3384
7	MF	(Spain)	Beñat Etxebarria	27	4	1	2410	1	0	0	90	5	1	1	466	33	5	2	2966
8	MF	(Spain)	Ander Iturraspe (3rd c)	12	12	0	1151	1	2	0	121	4	1	0	316	17	15	0	1588
10	MF	(Spain)	Iker Muniain	28	7	7	2412	1	2	0	138	7	1	0	599	36	10	7	3149
11	FW	(Spain)	Iñaki Williams	31	7	5	2801	3	0	2	264	7	1	1	557	41	8	8	3622
14	FW	(Spain)	Markel Susaeta (vc)	11	15	1	1104	1	2	0	104	3	4	0	266	15	21	1	1474
15	DF	(Spain)	Iñigo Lekue	17	8	2	1573	1	0	0	90	3	2	1	316	21	10	3	1979
16	DF	(Spain)	Xabier Etxeita	7	3	0	712	4	0	1	300	2	0	0	160	13	3	1	1172
17	MF	(Spain)	Mikel Rico	4	14	1	469	1	0	0	64	2	2	0	183	7	16	1	716
18	DF	(Spain)	Óscar de Marcos	24	3	1	2149	0	0	0	0	5	0	0	439	29	3	1	2588
19	FW	(Spain)	Sabin Merino	5	8	1	436	1	0	0	45	2	3	0	187	8	11	1	668
20	FW	(Spain)	Aritz Aduriz	27	5	16	2430	3	1	1	274	5	1	7	484	35	7	24	3188
22	MF	(Spain)	Raúl García	34	2	10	2883	3	0	3	226	7	0	1	628	44	2	14	3737
24	DF	(Spain)	Mikel Balenziaga	33	0	1	2851	3	0	0	270	7	0	0 (Note: Athletic credits a goal against APOEL to him, though the footage confirms a deflection.)	539	43	0	1	3660
25	DF	(Spain)	Enric Saborit	5	4	0	459	3	0	1	237	1	1	1	135	9	5	2	831
26	GK	(Spain)	Kepa Arrizabalaga	23	0	0	2016	0	0	0	0	0	0	0	0	23	0	0	2016
27	DF	(Spain)	Yeray Álvarez	25	1	0	2270	0	1	0	18	8	0	0	720	33	2	0	3008
Players left the club or on loan, in transfer windows or mid-season
12	MF	(Spain)	Mikel Vesga	3	3	0	285	1	0	0	90	1	0	0	90	5	3	0	465
13	GK	(Spain)	Iago Herrerín	0	0	0	0	0	0	0	0	5	0	0	450	5	0	0	450
21	FW	(Spain)	Borja Viguera	0	1	1	26	0	0	0	0	0	0	0	0	0	1	1	26
28	FW	(Spain)	Asier Villalibre	0	6	0	71	0	0	0	0	0	2	0	46	0	8	0	117

=== Disciplinary record ===
Iker Muniain's yellow card against Osasuna on matchday 10 was taken back in December 2016.

S	P	N	Name	League			Cup			Europe			Total		
S	P	N	Name	Yellow card	Yellow-red card	Red card	Yellow card	Yellow-red card	Red card	Yellow card	Yellow-red card	Red card	Yellow card	Yellow-red card	Red card
1	GK	(Spain)	Gorka Iraizoz	1	0	0	0	0	0	1	0	0	2	0	0
2	DF	(Spain)	Eneko Bóveda	1	0	0	0	0	0	0	0	0	1	0	0
3	DF	(Spain)	Gorka Elustondo	0	0	0	1	0	0	0	0	0	1	0	0
4	DF	(France)	Aymeric Laporte	10	0	0	1	0	0	2	0	0	13	0	0
5	MF	(Spain)	Javier Eraso	2	0	0	0	0	0	0	0	0	2	0	0
6	MF	(Spain)	Mikel San José	9	0	0	0	0	0	0	0	0	9	0	0
7	MF	(Spain)	Beñat Etxebarria	9	0	0	1	0	0	1	0	0	11	0	0
8	MF	(Spain)	Ander Iturraspe	3	0	0	0	1	0	1	1	0	4	2	0
10	MF	(Spain)	Iker Muniain	4	0	0	0	0	0	1	0	0	5	0	0
11	FW	(Spain)	Iñaki Williams	4	0	0	1	0	0	0	0	0	5	0	0
14	FW	(Spain)	Markel Susaeta	4	0	0	0	0	0	0	0	0	4	0	0
15	DF	(Spain)	Iñigo Lekue	1	0	0	0	0	0	1	0	0	2	0	0
16	DF	(Spain)	Xabier Etxeita	2	0	0	1	0	0	0	0	0	3	0	0
17	MF	(Spain)	Mikel Rico	4	0	0	0	0	0	0	0	0	4	0	0
18	DF	(Spain)	Óscar de Marcos	3	0	0	0	0	0	1	0	0	4	0	0
19	FW	(Spain)	Sabin Merino	2	0	0	0	0	0	0	0	0	2	0	0
20	FW	(Spain)	Aritz Aduriz	7	1	0	1	0	0	2	0	0	10	1	0
22	MF	(Spain)	Raúl García	11	0	0	0	1	0	5	0	0	16	1	0
24	DF	(Spain)	Mikel Balenziaga	3	0	1	0	0	0	0	0	0	3	0	1
25	DF	(Spain)	Enric Saborit	1	0	0	0	0	0	0	0	0	1	0	0
26	GK	(Spain)	Kepa Arrizabalaga	1	0	0	0	0	0	0	0	0	1	0	0
27	DF	(Spain)	Yeray Álvarez	3	0	0	0	0	0	1	0	0	4	0	0
Players left the club or on loan, in transfer windows or mid-season
12	MF	(Spain)	Mikel Vesga	1	0	0	0	0	0	0	0	0	1	0	0
13	GK	(Spain)	Iago Herrerín	0	0	0	0	0	0	0	0	0	0	0	0
21	FW	(Spain)	Borja Viguera	0	0	0	0	0	0	0	0	0	0	0	0
28	FW	(Spain)	Asier Villalibre	0	0	0	0	0	0	0	0	0	0	0	0

=== From the youth system ===
Note: Flags indicate national team as defined under FIFA eligibility rules; some limited exceptions apply. Players may hold more than one non-FIFA nationality.

No.	Pos.	Nation	Player
12	MF	ESP	Mikel Vesga
27	DF	ESP	Yeray Álvarez
28	FW	ESP	Asier Villalibre

=== Transfer ===
In

Date	Name	Moving from	Fee
6 June 2016	(Spain) Kepa Arrizabalaga	(Spain) Valladolid	Loan return

Out

Date	Name	Moving to	Fee
11 May 2016	(Spain) Carlos Gurpegi	Retired	
30 July 2016	(Spain) Ibai Gómez	(Spain) Alavés	Free
30 August 2016	(Spain) Borja Viguera	(Spain) Sporting Gijón	Undisclosed
31 August 2016	(Spain) Kike Sola	(Spain) Getafe	Loan
30 November 2016	(Spain) Iago Herrerín	(Spain) Leganés	Emergency loan
25 January 2017	(Spain) Mikel Vesga	(Spain) Sporting Gijón	Loan
30 January 2017	(Spain) Kike Sola	(Spain) Numancia	Loan
31 January 2017	(Spain) Ager Aketxe	(Spain) Cádiz	Loan
2 May 2017	(Spain) Asier Villalibre	(Spain) Numancia	Loan

== Staff ==
According to the official website.

Position	Name
Head coach	Ernesto Valverde
Assistant coach	Jon Aspiazu
Technical coaches	Carlos Gurpegi, Alberto Iglesias
Physical coaches	José Antonio Pozanco, Xabier Clemente
Goalkeeper coach	Aitor Iru
Representative	Andoni Imaz
Doctors	Josean Lekue, Paco Angulo
Masseur	Juan Manuel Ipiña
Physiotherapists	Álvaro Campa, Beñat Azula, Isusko Ortuzar
Podiatrist	Sergio Bilbao
Materials managers	Txetxu Gallego, Jon Eskalza, Iker López

== Pre-season and friendlies ==
20 July 2016 Friendly	Huesca	1–1	Athletic Bilbao	Huesca, Spain
19:00 CEST (UTC+02:00)	Camacho 45'	Report	Susaeta 45+2'	Stadium: El Alcoraz; Referee: Antonio Monter

23 July 2016 Friendly	Bordeaux	2–2	Athletic Bilbao	Tarnos, France
18:30 CEST (UTC+02:00)	Crivelli 17', 21' (pen.)	Report	Viguera 43'; Guillermo 49'	Stadium: Jean André Maye; Referee: Sylvain Palhies

27 July 2016 Friendly	Athletic Bilbao	1–1	Sporting Gijón	Leioa, Spain
18:30 CEST (UTC+02:00)	Williams 79'	Report	Burgui 9' (pen.)	Stadium: Sarriena; Referee: Ricardo de Burgos

30 July 2016 Friendly	Nantes	0–0	Athletic Bilbao	Saint-Nazaire, France
18:00 CEST (UTC+02:00)		Report		Stadium: Léo Lagrange; Referee: Lionel Jaffredo

7 August 2016 Friendly	Southampton	1–0	Athletic Bilbao	Southampton, England
15:00 BST (UTC+01:00)	Long 43'	Report		Stadium: St Mary's; Referee: Kevin Friend

9 August 2016 Friendly	Borussia Dortmund	0–1	Athletic Bilbao	St. Gallen, Switzerland
18:45 CEST (UTC+02:00)		Report	Susaeta 20'	Stadium: kybunpark Referee: Sandro Schärer

12 August 2016 Friendly	1899 Hoffenheim	1–1	Athletic Bilbao	Sinsheim, Germany
19:00 CEST (UTC+02:00)	Kramarić 25'	Report	Gil 21'	Stadium: Rhein-Neckar-Arena; Referee: Christian Dingert

14 August 2016 Friendly	Schalke 04	3–2	Athletic Bilbao	Gelsenkirchen, Germany
17:30 CEST (UTC+02:00)	Naldo 16'; Huntelaar 20'; Geis 82'	Report	San José 59'; Aduriz 90' (pen.)	Stadium: Veltins Arena; Referee: Guido Winkmann

6 October 2016 Friendly	Sestao River	0–4	Athletic Bilbao	Sestao, Spain
19:30 CEST (UTC+02:00)		Report	Elustondo 30'; Sabin 45'; Eraso 66', 83'	Stadium: Las Llanas; Referee: Ricardo de Burgos

== Competitions ==
=== Overview ===
Competition	First match	Last match	Starting round	Final position	Record							
Competition	First match	Last match	Starting round	Final position	Pld	W	D	L	GF	GA	GD	Win %
La Liga	21 August 2016	21 May 2017	Matchday 1	7th	38	19	6	13	53	43	+10	50.00
Europa League	15 September 2016	23 February 2017	Group stage	Round of 32	8	4	1	3	13	15	−2	50.00
Copa del Rey	1 December 2016	11 January 2017	Round of 32	Round of 16	4	3	0	1	8	5	+3	75.00
Total					50	26	7	17	74	63	+11	52.00

Source: Competitions

=== La Liga ===
League table

Pos	Team	Pld	W	D	L	GF	GA	GD	Pts	Qualification or relegation
5	Villarreal	38	19	10	9	56	33	+23	67	Qualification for the Europa League group stage (Note: Since the winners of the 2016–17 Copa del Rey, Barcelona, qualified for European competition based on league position, the spot awarded to the cup winners (Europa League group stage) was passed to the sixth-placed team and the spot awarded to the sixth-placed team (Europa League third qualifying round) was passed to the seventh-placed team.)
6	Real Sociedad	38	19	7	12	59	53	+6	64	Qualification for the Europa League group stage
7	Athletic Bilbao	38	19	6	13	53	43	+10	63	Qualification for the Europa League third qualifying round
8	Espanyol	38	15	11	12	49	50	−1	56	
9	Alavés	38	14	13	11	41	43	−2	55	

Source: La Liga, Soccerway
Rules for classification: 1) Points; 2) Head-to-head points; 3) Head-to-head goal difference; 4) Goal difference; 5) Goals scored; 6) Fair-play points; 7) Play-off.

==== Results summary ====
Overall								Home						Away					
Pld	W	D	L	GF	GA	GD	Pts	W	D	L	GF	GA	GD	W	D	L	GF	GA	GD
38	19	6	13	53	43	+10	63	13	4	2	36	18	+18	6	2	11	17	25	−8

Round by round

Round	1	2	3	4	5	6	7	8	9	10	11	12	13	14	15	16	17	18	19	20	21	22	23	24	25	26	27	28	29	30	31	32	33	34	35	36	37	38
Ground	A	H	A	H	A	H	A	H	A	H	A	H	A	H	A	H	H	A	H	H	A	H	A	H	A	H	A	H	A	H	A	H	A	H	A	A	H	A
Result	L	L	W	W	W	W	L	W	L	D	D	W	L	W	L	W	D	D	D	W	L	W	L	W	L	W	W	L	W	W	L	W	W	W	W	L	D	L
Position	14	18	14	10	7	5	6	6	6	7	7	7	8	7	7	7	7	7	7	7	9	8	8	8	8	7	7	7	7	6	8	6	6	6	6	6	6	7

==== Matches ====
21 August 2016 1	Sporting Gijón	2–1	Athletic Bilbao	Gijón
18:30 CEST (UTC+02:00)	I. López (yellow card) 16'; Amorebieta (yellow card) 45'; Čop 50'; Rodríguez 53'	Report	Laporte (yellow card) 59'; Bóveda (yellow card) 60'; Muniain (yellow card) 75'; Viguera 86'	Stadium: El Molinón; Attendance: 24,833; Referee: Carlos Clos (Aragon)

28 August 2016 2	Athletic Bilbao	0–1	Barcelona	Bilbao
20:15 CEST (UTC+02:00)	Susaeta (yellow card) 45+1'; Iturraspe (yellow card) 56'; Eraso (yellow card) 62'; Beñat (yellow card) 83'; Balenziaga (yellow card) 89'	Report	Umtiti (yellow card) 10'; Rakitić 21'; Busquets (yellow card) 37'; L. Suárez (yellow card) 37'; Roberto (yellow card) 59'	Stadium: San Mamés; Attendance: 46,724; Referee: Antonio Mateu (Valencia)

11 September 2016 3	Deportivo La Coruña	0–1	Athletic Bilbao	A Coruña
20:30 CEST (UTC+02:00)	Borges (yellow card) 70'; Albentosa (yellow card) 90'	Report	García (yellow card) 19' (goal) 41'; San José (yellow card) 67'; Beñat (yellow card) 71'	Stadium: Riazor; Attendance: 22,317; Referee: Xavier Estrada (Catalonia)

18 September 2016 4	Athletic Bilbao	2–1	Valencia	Bilbao
16:15 CEST (UTC+02:00)	García (yellow card) 19'; Aduriz 24', 41' (yellow card) 84'; Beñat (yellow card) 27'; Susaeta (yellow card) 74'	Report	Medrán 2'; Gayà (yellow card) 23'; Parejo (yellow card) 66'; Cancelo (yellow card) 77'; Mangala (yellow card) 90+1'	Stadium: San Mamés; Attendance: 40,907; Referee: Jesús Gil (Extremadura)

21 September 2016 5	Granada	1–2	Athletic Bilbao	Granada
22:00 CEST (UTC+02:00)	Foulquier (yellow card) 17'; Carcela 44'	Report	García 15'; Laporte 77'	Stadium: Nuevo Los Cármenes; Attendance: 14,662; Referee: Juan Martínez Munuera (Valencia)

24 September 2016 6	Athletic Bilbao	3–1	Sevilla	Bilbao
18:30 CEST (UTC+02:00)	San José 26'; Aduriz (yellow card) 33' (goal) 90' (pen.); Balenziaga 66'; Williams (yellow card) 90+3'	Report	Nasri 55'; Mercado (yellow card) 56'; Sirigu (red card) 88'; Mariano (yellow card) 90+3'	Stadium: San Mamés; Attendance: 42,650; Referee: Alejandro Hernández (Canary Islands)

2 October 2016 7	Málaga	2–1	Athletic Bilbao	Málaga
18:30 CEST (UTC+02:00)	Rosales (yellow card) 36'; Ricca (yellow card) 45+1'; Castro (yellow card) 54'; Recio (yellow card) 68'; Koné (yellow card) 70' (yellow-red card) 90+4'; Sandro 82'; Duda 83' (yellow card) 84'; Charles (yellow card) 84'; Juanpi (yellow card) 88'	Report	Aduriz 3'; Balenziaga (red card) 36'; De Marcos (yellow card) 52'; Sabin (yellow card) 59'; Laporte (yellow card) 86'	Stadium: La Rosaleda; Attendance: 23,188; Referee: Carlos del Cerro (Madrid)

16 October 2016 8	Athletic Bilbao	3–2	Real Sociedad	Bilbao
16:15 CEST (UTC+02:00)	Aduriz (yellow card) 6' (goal) 60'; García (yellow card) 11'; San José (yellow card) 41'; Muniain 51'; Williams 72'	Report	I. Martínez (yellow card) 6' (goal) 83'; Zurutuza 16'; Illarramendi (yellow card) 28'; Rulli (yellow card) 39'	Stadium: San Mamés; Attendance: 47,428; Referee: José González (Castile and Léon)

23 October 2016 9	Real Madrid	2–1	Athletic Bilbao	Madrid
20:45 CEST (UTC+02:00)	Benzema 7'; Morata 83' (yellow card) 87'; Carvajal (yellow card) 90+4'	Report	Sabin 27'; Etxeita (yellow card) 31'; García (yellow card) 55'; Laporte (yellow card) 87'	Stadium: Santiago Bernabéu; Attendance: 72,910; Referee: Ignacio Iglesias (Galicia)

30 October 2016 10	Athletic Bilbao	1–1	Osasuna	Bilbao
16:15 CET (UTC+01:00)	García 28'; Muniain (yellow card) 60'; Rico (yellow card) 71'	Report	Riera 23'; Oier (yellow card) 74'	Stadium: San Mamés; Attendance: 43,696; Referee: José Luis Munuera Montero (Andalusia)

6 November 2016 11	Espanyol	0–0	Athletic Bilbao	Cornellà de Llobregat
16:15 CET (UTC+01:00)	Fuego (yellow card) 12'	Report	Eraso (yellow card) 6'; Rico (yellow card) 45'	Stadium: RCDE; Attendance: 21,904; Referee: Daniel Trujillo (Canary Islands)

20 November 2016 12	Athletic Bilbao	1–0	Villarreal	Bilbao
20:45 CET (UTC+01:00)	García 67'	Report	Sansone (yellow card) 17'; Costa (yellow card) 76'	Stadium: San Mamés; Attendance: 38,399; Referee: José Sánchez (Murcia)

28 November 2016 13	Las Palmas	3–1	Athletic Bilbao	Las Palmas
19:45 WET (UTC±00:00)	Boateng 40'; Momo 50'; Mesa (yellow card) 55'; Livaja (yellow card) 58'; Viera (yellow card) 85' (goal) 90'	Report	Laporte (yellow card) 31'; Beñat (yellow card) 38'; Yeray (yellow card) 65'; Aduriz (yellow card) 74' (yellow-red card) 74'; García 79' (pen.) (yellow card) 87'	Stadium: Gran Canaria; Attendance: 20,717; Referee: Alfonso Álvarez (Catalonia)

4 December 2016 14	Athletic Bilbao	3–1	Eibar	Bilbao
16:15 CET (UTC+01:00)	Beñat 42'; Williams 55'; San José (yellow card) 81'; Muniain 90+1'	Report	Inui (yellow card) 30'; Gálvez (yellow card) 41'; León (yellow card) 42'; Arbilla (yellow card) 61'; Enrich 70'	Stadium: San Mamés; Attendance: 42,831; Referee: Xavier Estrada (Catalonia)

11 December 2016 15	Real Betis	1–0	Athletic Bilbao	Seville
20:45 CET (UTC+01:00)	Piccini (yellow card) 15'; Castro (yellow card) 16' (goal) 18'; Cejudo (yellow card) 74'	Report	Laporte (yellow card) 3'; García (yellow card) 47'	Stadium: Benito Villamarín; Attendance: 34,481; Referee: Antonio Mateu (Valencia)

19 December 2016 16	Athletic Bilbao	2–1	Celta Vigo	Bilbao
20:45 CET (UTC+01:00)	Vesga (yellow card) 10'; García (yellow card) 58'; Lekue (yellow card) 79'; Aduriz 82' (pen.); Yeray (yellow card) 86'; San José 90+3'	Report	Hernández (yellow card) 38'; Guidetti (yellow card) 41'; Aspas 54'; Roncaglia (yellow card) 56' (yellow-red card) 80'	Stadium: San Mamés; Attendance: 35,945; Referee: David Fernández (Andalusia)

8 January 2017 17	Athletic Bilbao	0–0	Alavés	Bilbao
12:00 CET (UTC+01:00)	Aduriz (yellow card) 45'; Rico (yellow card) 45'	Report	Laguardia (yellow card) 62'; Feddal (yellow card) 64'; Deyverson (yellow card) 89'; Torres (yellow card) 90+3'	Stadium: San Mamés; Attendance: 42,366; Referee: Carlos del Cerro (Madrid)

14 January 2017 18	Leganés	0–0	Athletic Bilbao	Leganés
13:00 CET (UTC+01:00)	Díaz (yellow card) 51'; Pérez (yellow card) 67'; Insua (yellow card) 89'	Report	Aduriz (yellow card) 65'; García (yellow card) 69'; Beñat (yellow card) 80'	Stadium: Butarque; Attendance: 10,992; Referee: Santiago Jaime (Aragon)

22 January 2017 19	Athletic Bilbao	2–2	Atlético Madrid	Bilbao
16:15 CET (UTC+01:00)	Williams (yellow card) 36'; Lekue 42'; De Marcos 56'; Iturraspe (yellow card) 63'	Report	Koke 3'; Gabi (yellow card) 47'; Carrasco (yellow card) 64'; Griezmann 80'; Giménez (yellow card) 90+3'	Stadium: San Mamés; Attendance: 44,457; Referee: Ignacio Iglesias (Galicia)

29 January 2017 20	Athletic Bilbao	2–1	Sporting Gijón	Bilbao
18:30 CET (UTC+01:00)	Muniain 50'; Williams (yellow card) 66'; Aduriz 71' (pen.), (yellow card) 83'; Rico (yellow card) 84'; García (yellow card) 90+2'	Report	Čop 27' (pen.); Amorebieta (yellow card) 29'; Canella (yellow card) 46'; Carmona (yellow card) 68'; Torres (yellow card) 85'	Stadium: San Mamés; Attendance: 41,812; Referee: Carlos Clos (Aragon)

4 February 2017 21	Barcelona	3–0	Athletic Bilbao	Barcelona
16:15 CET (UTC+01:00)	Alcácer 18'; Piqué (yellow card) 22'; Messi 40'; Vidal 67'	Report	Iturraspe (yellow card) 27'; De Marcos (yellow card) 34'; Laporte (yellow card) 70'	Stadium: Camp Nou; Attendance: 83,884; Referee: José González (Castile and Léon)

11 February 2017 22	Athletic Bilbao	2–1	Deportivo La Coruña	Bilbao
18:30 CET (UTC+01:00)	San José (yellow card) 62'; Muniain 71'; Aduriz 89'	Report	Çolak 42'; Navarro (yellow card) 58'; Joselu (yellow card) 88'	Stadium: San Mamés; Attendance: 41,612; Referee: Mario Melero (Andalusia)

19 February 2017 23	Valencia	2–0	Athletic Bilbao	Valencia
16:15 CET (UTC+01:00)	Nani 13'; Zaza 45'	Report	García (yellow card) 29'	Stadium: Mestalla; Attendance: 36,396; Referee: David Fernández (Andalusia)

26 February 2017 24	Athletic Bilbao	3–1	Granada	Bilbao
18:30 CET (UTC+01:00)	Susaeta 11'; Lekue 33'; San José 69'; Williams (yellow card) 88'	Report	Carcela 14'; Wakaso (yellow card) 59'; Ramos (yellow card) 61'; Silva (yellow card) 69'; Ochoa (yellow card) 69'; Samper (yellow card) 80'	Stadium: San Mamés; Attendance: 37,563; Referee: Daniel Trujillo (Canary Islands)

2 March 2017 25	Sevilla	1–0	Athletic Bilbao	Seville
21:30 CET (UTC+01:00)	Iborra 14'; Jovetić (yellow card) 37'; Mariano (yellow card) 69'; Mercado (yellow card) 75'; Nasri (yellow card) 84'; Correa (yellow card) 90'; Kranevitter (yellow card) 90+2'	Report	Susaeta (yellow card) 70'; Etxeita (yellow card) 90+1'	Stadium: Ramón Sánchez Pizjuán; Attendance: 34,156; Referee: Daniel Ocón (La Rioja)

5 March 2017 26	Athletic Bilbao	1–0	Málaga	Bilbao
20:45 CET (UTC+01:00)	Beñat (yellow card) 48'; García 72' (pen.) (yellow card) 90'; Saborit (yellow card) 90+3'	Report	Fornals (yellow card) 67'; Keko (yellow card) 72'; Juankar (yellow card) 74'; Camacho (yellow card) 80'; Charles (yellow card) 90'	Stadium: San Mamés; Attendance: 33,625; Referee: Alfonso Álvarez (Catalonia)

12 March 2017 27	Real Sociedad	0–2	Athletic Bilbao	San Sebastián
12:00 CET (UTC+01:00)	Illarramendi (yellow card) 26'; I. Martínez (yellow card) 50'; Berchiche (yellow card) 77'	Report	García 28' (pen.); Muniain (yellow card) 39'; Laporte (yellow card) 50'; Williams 56'; San José (yellow card) 68'; Beñat (yellow card) 73'; Arrizabalaga (yellow card) 79'; Balenziaga (yellow card) 90'	Stadium: Anoeta; Attendance: 25,557; Referee: José Sánchez (Murcia)

18 March 2017 28	Athletic Bilbao	1–2	Real Madrid	Bilbao
16:15 CET (UTC+01:00)	Aduriz (yellow card) 28' (goal) 65'	Report	Benzema 25'; Carvajal (yellow card) 28'; Casemiro (yellow card) 31' (goal) 68'; Kroos (yellow card) 71'; Navas (yellow card) 90+3'	Stadium: San Mamés; Attendance: 49,164; Referee: Santiago Jaime (Aragon)

1 April 2017 29	Osasuna	1–2	Athletic Bilbao	Pamplona
16:15 CEST (UTC+02:00)	Riera (yellow card) 22'; Mérida (yellow card) 36'; Oier (yellow card) 60'; León 79'; Clerc (yellow card) 81'	Report	Aduriz 12'; Muniain (yellow card) 34'; Williams 44'; De Marcos (yellow card) 84'	Stadium: El Sadar; Attendance: 15,755; Referee: José Luis Munuera Montero (Andalusia)

4 April 2017 30	Athletic Bilbao	2–0	Espanyol	Bilbao
19:30 CEST (UTC+02:00)	Aduriz 17' (pen.), 37'; Yeray (yellow card) 27'	Report	Álvarez (yellow card) 18'; Da. López (yellow card) 37'; Fuego (yellow card) 90+1'	Stadium: San Mamés; Attendance: 38,586; Referee: Juan Martínez Munuera (Valencia)

7 April 2017 31	Villarreal	3–1	Athletic Bilbao	Villarreal
20:45 CEST (UTC+02:00)	Ruiz 17' (red card) 74'; Bakambu 47' (yellow card) 53'; Soriano (yellow card) 53'; Adrián 58'; Mario (yellow card) 64'; Bruno (yellow card) 74'; Fernández (yellow card) 90+2'; Sansone (yellow card) 90+4'	Report	Laporte 20' (yellow card) 25'; Beñat (yellow card) 22'; Iraizoz (yellow card) 76'	Stadium: La Cerámica; Attendance: 17,948; Referee: Daniel Trujillo (Canary Islands)

14 April 2017 32	Athletic Bilbao	5–1	Las Palmas	Bilbao
20:45 CEST (UTC+02:00)	San José 7' (yellow card) 66'; Muniain 9', 58'; Aduriz 18', 59'	Report	Bigas 12'; Viera (yellow card) 60'; Livaja (yellow card) 89'	Stadium: San Mamés; Attendance: 36,502; Referee: Xavier Estrada (Catalonia)

24 April 2017 33	Eibar	0–1	Athletic Bilbao	Eibar
20:45 CEST (UTC+02:00)	Ramis (yellow card) 28'; Escalante (red card) 56'; Rivera (yellow card) 73'; Gálvez (yellow card) 90+3'; León (yellow card) 90+5'	Report	San José (yellow card) 80'; Sabin (yellow card) 85'; García 90+4'	Stadium: Ipurua; Attendance: 6,543; Referee: Carlos del Cerro (Madrid)

27 April 2017 34	Athletic Bilbao	2–1	Real Betis	Bilbao
21:30 CEST (UTC+02:00)	Susaeta (yellow card) 8'; Aduriz 53' (pen.); Muniain 60'	Report	Brašanac (yellow card) 13'; Mandi (yellow card) 58'; Castro 63'; Adán (yellow card) 72'	Stadium: San Mamés; Attendance: 34,301; Referee: José González (Castile and Léon)

30 April 2017 35	Celta Vigo	0–3	Athletic Bilbao	Vigo
20:45 CEST (UTC+02:00)	Fontàs (yellow card) 61'	Report	García 35', 50'; Laporte (yellow card) 69'; Rico 83'	Stadium: Balaídos; Attendance: 17,054; Referee: David Fernández (Andalusia)

7 May 2017 36	Alavés	1–0	Athletic Bilbao	Vitoria-Gasteiz
12:00 CEST (UTC+02:00)	Deyverson (yellow card) 36'; Hernandez 53'	Report	Balenziaga (yellow card) 14'; Muniain (yellow card) 41'; San José (yellow card) 56'; Laporte (yellow card) 84'	Stadium: Mendizorrotza; Attendance: 16,003; Referee: Juan Martínez Munuera (Valencia)

14 May 2017 37	Athletic Bilbao	1–1	Leganés	Bilbao
20:00 CEST (UTC+02:00)	Aduriz 14'; Beñat (yellow card) 29'; San José (yellow card) 84'	Report	Szymanowski (yellow card) 35' (goal) 61'; Pérez (yellow card) 44'; Bustinza (yellow card) 65'; El Zhar (yellow card) 73'; Timor (yellow card) 83'; Champagne (yellow card) 90+2'	Stadium: San Mamés; Attendance: 42,292; Referee: David Fernández (Andalusia)

21 May 2017 38	Atlético Madrid	3–1	Athletic Bilbao	Madrid
16:45 CEST (UTC+02:00)	Torres 8', 11'; Thomas (yellow card) 38'; Gabi (yellow card) 45'; Correa 89'	Report	Williams 71'	Stadium: Vicente Calderón; Attendance: 52,155; Referee: Xavier Estrada (Catalonia)

=== Copa del Rey ===
Round of 32

1 December 2016 First leg	Racing Santander	1–2	Athletic Bilbao	Santander
22:00 CET (UTC+01:00)	Cobo 23'; Pena (yellow card) 39'; Peña (yellow card) 39'; Gómez (yellow card) 73'	Report	García 11', 28'	Stadium: El Sardinero; Attendance: 10,661; Referee: José Luis Munuera Montero (Andalusia)

22 December 2016 Second leg	Athletic Bilbao	3–0 (5–1 agg.)	Racing Santander	Bilbao
21:00 CET (UTC+01:00)	Etxeita 17'; García 47'; Williams 72'	Report	Peña (yellow card) 40'	Stadium: San Mamés; Attendance: 29,633; Referee: Daniel Trujillo (Canary Islands)

Round of 16

5 January 2017 First leg	Athletic Bilbao	2–1	Barcelona	Bilbao
21:15 CET (UTC+01:00)	Aduriz 25' (yellow card) 40'; Williams 28'; Iturraspe (yellow card) 53' (yellow-red card) 80'; García (yellow card) 55' (yellow-red card) 74'	Report	Umtiti (yellow card) 40'; Busquets (yellow card) 45'; Iniesta (yellow card) 45'; Alba (yellow card) 45'; Messi 52'	Stadium: San Mamés; Attendance: 45,772; Referee: David Fernández (Andalusia)

11 January 2017 Second leg	Barcelona	3–1 (4–3 agg.)	Athletic Bilbao	Barcelona
21:15 CET (UTC+01:00)	Umtiti (yellow card) 30'; L. Suárez 35'; Neymar 48' (pen.); Messi 78'	Report	Etxeita (yellow card) 28'; Laporte (yellow card) 41'; Saborit 51'; Elustondo (yellow card) 73'; Beñat (yellow card) 77'; Williams (yellow card) 90'	Stadium: Camp Nou; Attendance: 71,455; Referee: Jesús Gil (Extremadura)

=== UEFA Europa League ===
==== Group stage ====
Pos	Team	Pld	W	D	L	GF	GA	GD	Pts	Qualification
1	(Belgium) Genk	6	4	0	2	13	9	+4	12	Advance to knockout phase
2	(Spain) Athletic Bilbao	6	3	1	2	10	11	−1	10	Advance to knockout phase
3	(Austria) Rapid Wien	6	1	3	2	7	8	−1	6	
4	(Italy) Sassuolo	6	1	2	3	9	11	−2	5	

Source: UEFA
Rules for classification: Group stage tiebreakers

15 September 2016 1	Sassuolo (Italy)	3–0	(Spain) Athletic Bilbao	Reggio Emilia, Italy
19:00 CEST (UTC+02:00)	Acerbi (yellow card) 54'; Lirola 60'; Mazzitelli (yellow card) 62'; Defrel 75'; Politano 82'	Report	García (yellow card) 90+4'	Stadium: Mapei; Attendance: 7,032; Referee: Paweł Raczkowski (Poland)

29 September 2016 2	Athletic Bilbao (Spain)	1–0	(Austria) Rapid Wien	Bilbao, Spain
21:05 CEST (UTC+02:00)	Beñat 59'; Yeray (yellow card) 83'	Report	Schrammel (yellow card) 29'; Dibon (yellow card) 65'; Grahovac (yellow card) 72'; Joelinton (yellow card) 74'	Stadium: San Mamés; Attendance: 34,039; Referee: Tony Chapron (France)

20 October 2016 3	Genk (Belgium)	2–0	(Spain) Athletic Bilbao	Genk, Belgium
21:05 CEST (UTC+02:00)	Brabec 40'; Sušić (yellow card) 64'; Ndidi 83'	Report	Aduriz (yellow card) 24'; García (yellow card) 60'; Muniain (yellow card) 90'; Lekue (yellow card) 90+4'	Stadium: Luminus Arena; Attendance: 9,530; Referee: Stefan Johannesson (Sweden)

3 November 2016 4	Athletic Bilbao (Spain)	5–3	(Belgium) Genk	Bilbao, Spain
19:00 CET (UTC+01:00)	Aduriz 8', 24' (pen.), 44' (pen.), 74', 90+4' (pen.); Iturraspe (yellow card) 38'	Report	Sušić (yellow card) 6' (goal) 80'; Bailey 28'; Nastić (yellow card) 42'; Colley (yellow card) 43'; Ndidi 51' (yellow card) 90+4'; Pozuelo (yellow card) 87'	Stadium: San Mamés; Attendance: 33,417; Referee: Martin Atkinson (England)

24 November 2016 5	Athletic Bilbao (Spain)	3–2	(Italy) Sassuolo	Bilbao, Spain
21:05 CET (UTC+01:00)	García 10' (yellow card) 37'; Aduriz (yellow card) 52' (goal) 58'; Laporte (yellow card) 76'; Lekue 79'	Report	Balenziaga 2' (o.g.); Acerbi (yellow card) 72'; Ragusa (yellow card) 78' (goal) 83'; Missiroli (yellow card) 90+3'; Magnanelli (yellow card) 90+4'	Stadium: San Mamés; Attendance: 37,806; Referee: Viktor Kassai (Hungary)

8 December 2016 6	Rapid Wien (Austria)	1–1	(Spain) Athletic Bilbao	Vienna, Austria
19:00 CET (UTC+01:00)	Joelinton 72' (yellow card) 84'; Auer (yellow card) 89'; Wöber (yellow card) 90+3'	Report	Saborit 84'; Beñat (yellow card) 88'	Stadium: Allianz; Attendance: 21,500; Referee: Serdar Gözübüyük (Netherlands)

==== Knockout phase ====
Round of 32

16 February 2017 First leg	Athletic Bilbao (Spain)	3–2	(Cyprus) APOEL	Bilbao, Spain
21:05 CET (UTC+01:00)	García (yellow card) 25'; Merkis 38' (o.g.); Laporte (yellow card) 48'; Aduriz 61'; Williams 72'	Report	Efrem (yellow card) 9' (goal) 36'; Merkis (yellow card) 13'; Gianniotas (yellow card) 52' (goal) 89'; Yambéré (yellow card) 65'	Stadium: San Mamés; Attendance: 32,675; Referee: Jonas Eriksson (Sweden)

23 February 2017 Second leg	APOEL (Cyprus)	2–0 (4–3 agg.)	(Spain) Athletic Bilbao	Nicosia, Cyprus
20:00 EET (UTC+02:00)	Sotiriou 46' (yellow card) 44' (yellow-red card) 65'; Gianniotas 54' (pen.); Ioannou (yellow card) 57'; De Camargo (yellow card) 87'	Report	García (yellow card) 45+2'; De Marcos (yellow card) 54'; Iturraspe (yellow card) 75' (yellow-red card) 90+1'; Iraizoz (yellow card) 90+5'	Stadium: GSP; Attendance: 15,275; Referee: Vladislav Bezborodov (Russia)

== See also ==
- Athletic Bilbao in European football
