= Iñaki Williams =

Footballer (born 1994)

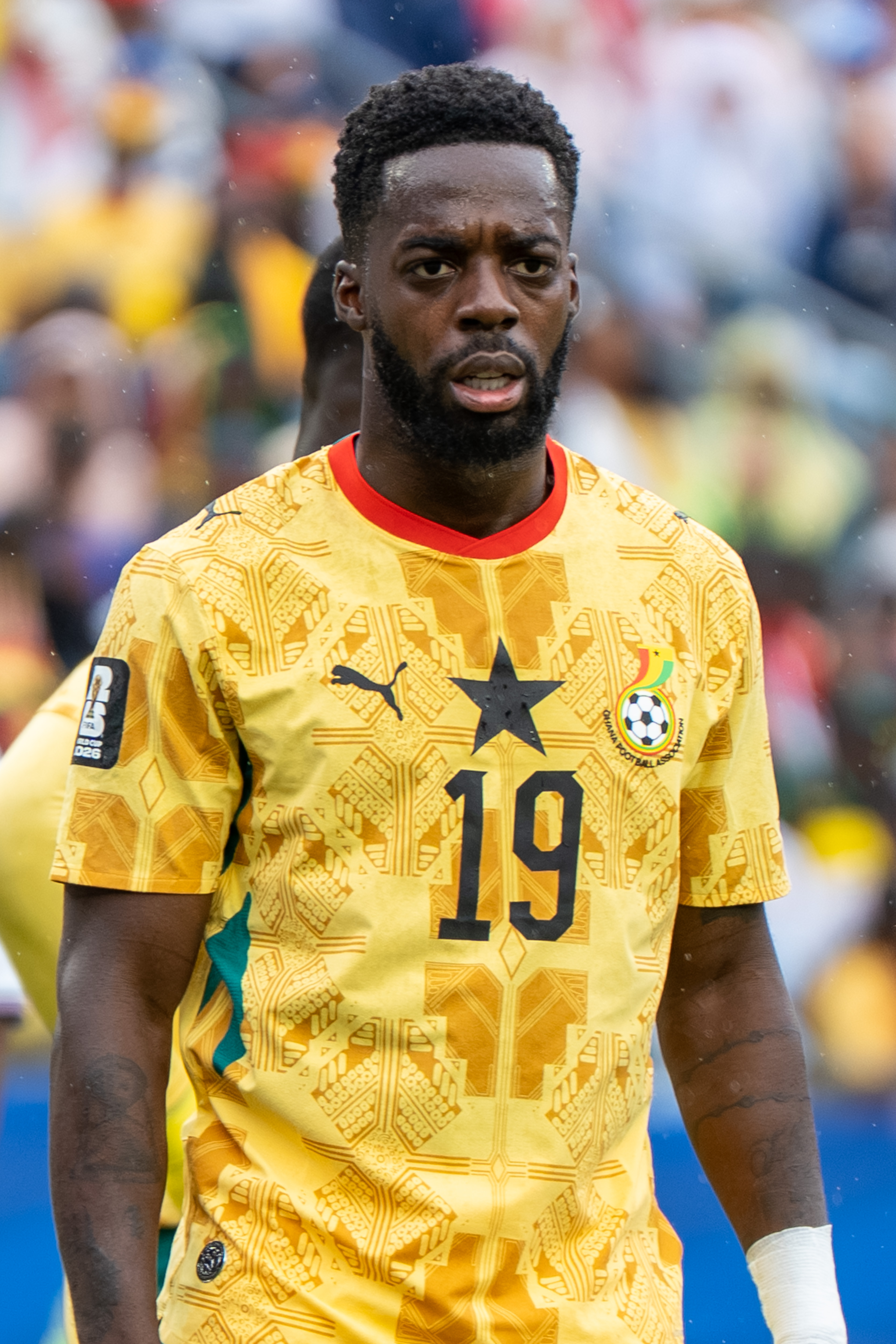
- Williams with Ghana in 2026

Personal information
- Full name: Iñaki Williams Arthuer
- Date of birth: 15 June 1994 (age 32)
- Place of birth: Bilbao, Spain
- Height: 1.86 m (6 ft 1 in)
- Position: Forward

Team information
- Current team: Athletic Bilbao
- Number: 9

Youth career
- Natación Pamplona
- 2008–2012: Pamplona
- 2012–2013: Athletic Bilbao

Senior career*
Years	Team	Apps	(Gls)
2013–2014	Basconia	18	(7)
2014–2015	Bilbao Athletic	32	(21)
2014–	Athletic Bilbao	419	(88)

International career
2015–2017	Spain U21	17	(3)
2016	Spain	1	(0)
2018–2020	Basque Country	2	(0)
2022–2026	Ghana	28	(2)
Medal record
Men's football
Representing Spain
UEFA European Under-21 Championship
Runner-up	2017 Poland	Team
- * Club domestic league appearances and goals as of 22:13, 20 November 2026 (UTC)

Iñaki Williams Arthuer (born 15 June 1994) is a professional footballer who plays as a forward for and captains La Liga club Athletic Bilbao.

Developed at Athletic Bilbao's academy, he has made over 500 first-team appearances for the club, including a La Liga record of 251 consecutive matches. He scored the winning goal of the 2020–21 Supercopa de España, and also won the 2023–24 Copa del Rey.

Born in Spain to Ghanaian parents, Williams made one appearance for the Spain national team in 2016. In 2022, he switched to represent Ghana at international level, and was selected for two FIFA World Cups as well as the 2023 Africa Cup of Nations. His younger brother Nico also plays for Athletic Bilbao, and for Spain.

== Club career ==
=== Early life and youth career ===
Born in Bilbao, Biscay to Ghanaian parents, who had arrived in Spain by crossing the Sahara on foot and jumping the Melilla border fence, Williams spent most of his childhood living in Pamplona, specifically the Rochapea neighbourhood, and was playing youth football with local club CD Pamplona when he was spotted by Athletic Bilbao, who signed him to their youth setup at Lezama at the age of 18. He spent his first season with the Juvenil A side and made a big impression, scoring at the rate of almost a goal a game (eventually ending with 36); the team finished runners-up in the Copa del Rey Juvenil de Fútbol, and on 25 June 2013 he signed a new contract with the Basque club, running until 2017.

Williams began 2013–14 playing with the farm team Basconia who competed in the Tercera División. After suffering a knee injury in August, he returned to activity in October, making his senior debut and marking it with a goal. He was immediately called up to the reserves in the Segunda División B and by the end of the same month had played his first match and scored his first goals at that level; he spent the campaign alternating between both squads.

At the start of 2014–15, Williams scored a hat-trick for Bilbao Athletic in a 4–0 win against Amorebieta, and followed this on 7 September 2014 with another treble in a 5–1 win over Leioa. Despite only playing the first half of the season, his 13 goals from 18 appearances helped the team ascend to the Segunda División.

=== Athletic Bilbao ===
On 6 December 2014, benefitting from Aritz Aduriz's injury, Williams made his first-team (and La Liga) debut, starting in a 1–0 home loss against Córdoba. He netted his first goal on 19 February of the following year, starting and contributing to a 2–2 draw at Torino in the round of 32 of the UEFA Europa League, becoming in the process the first black player to score for the club.

On 17 May 2015, Williams scored his first goal in the top flight, netting a last-minute winner in a 3–2 away victory over Elche to help Athletic come from being behind 2–0. Thirteen days later, he headed a consolation goal in the 3–1 loss to Barcelona in the final of the Copa del Rey at the Camp Nou. He missed the 2015 Supercopa de España victory over the same opponents three months later through injury.

Williams scored a brace (before giving away a penalty) in a 3–1 win away to Real Betis on 1 November 2015. He repeated the feat the following match, at home against Partizan in the Europa League group stage (5–1). Finding the net in his third match running, he scored "a phenomenal volley" to help beat Espanyol 2–1 at the San Mamés Stadium.

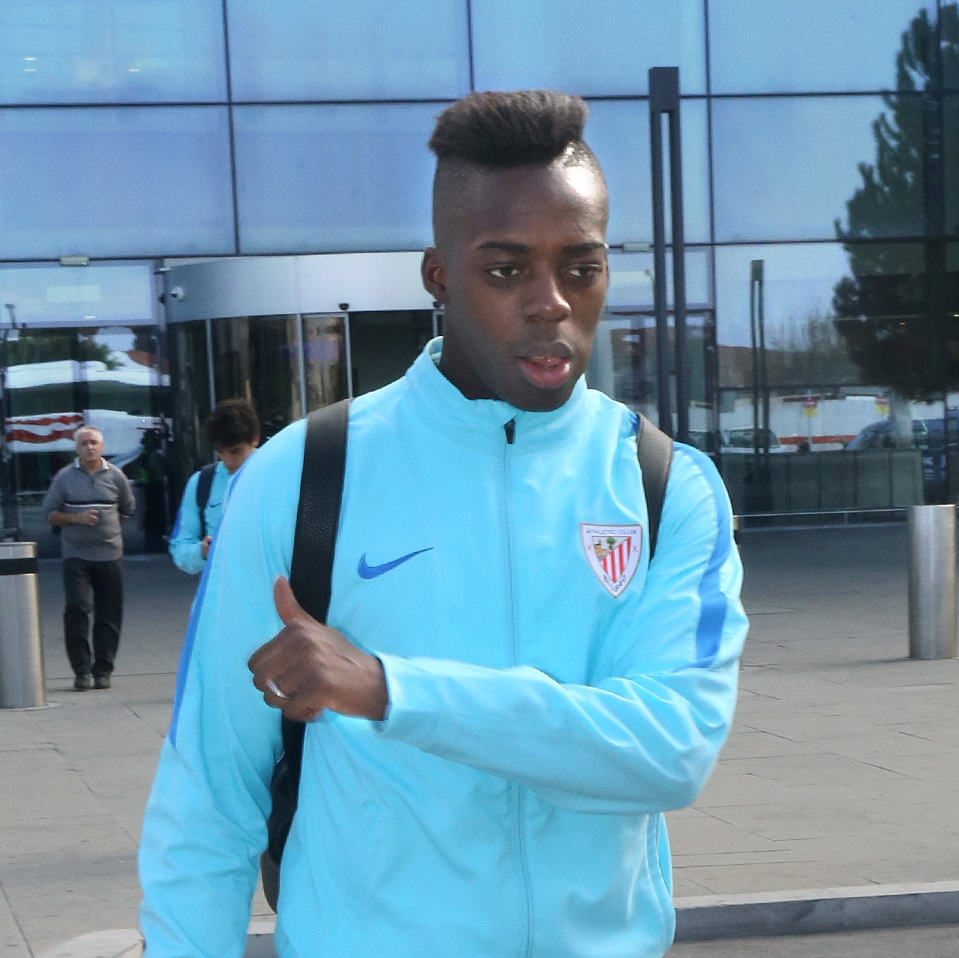
Williams with Athletic Bilbao in 2015

In late January 2016, having been scouted by the likes of Arsenal, Liverpool and Manchester City, Williams agreed to an extension of his contract until 2021; the deal included a €50 million buyout clause. He was sent off on 6 February at the end of a goalless home draw with Villarreal, together with opponent Daniele Bonera.

During autumn 2017, Williams scored important late goals in the Europa League against Östersund and Hertha BSC to help his team finish top of the group. On 17 January 2018, he agreed a contract renewal running until 2025 with an incremental buyout clause of around €80 million.

On 13 January 2019, Williams scored both goals in a 2–0 home league win over Sevilla, finding the net at San Mamés for the first time in 41 league appearances (the previous occasion being in December 2016). His second, involving a turn and sprint from his own half, touch away from the goalkeeper and precise finish at high speed, was described as "incredible" – it was later awarded as the Marca Golden Goal of the season. The fixture was also his 100th successive match in the league, only the fifth Athletic player to achieve this and the first outfield player from any Spanish club to do so since Fran in 1993; for his performances, he was named the La Liga Player of the Month.

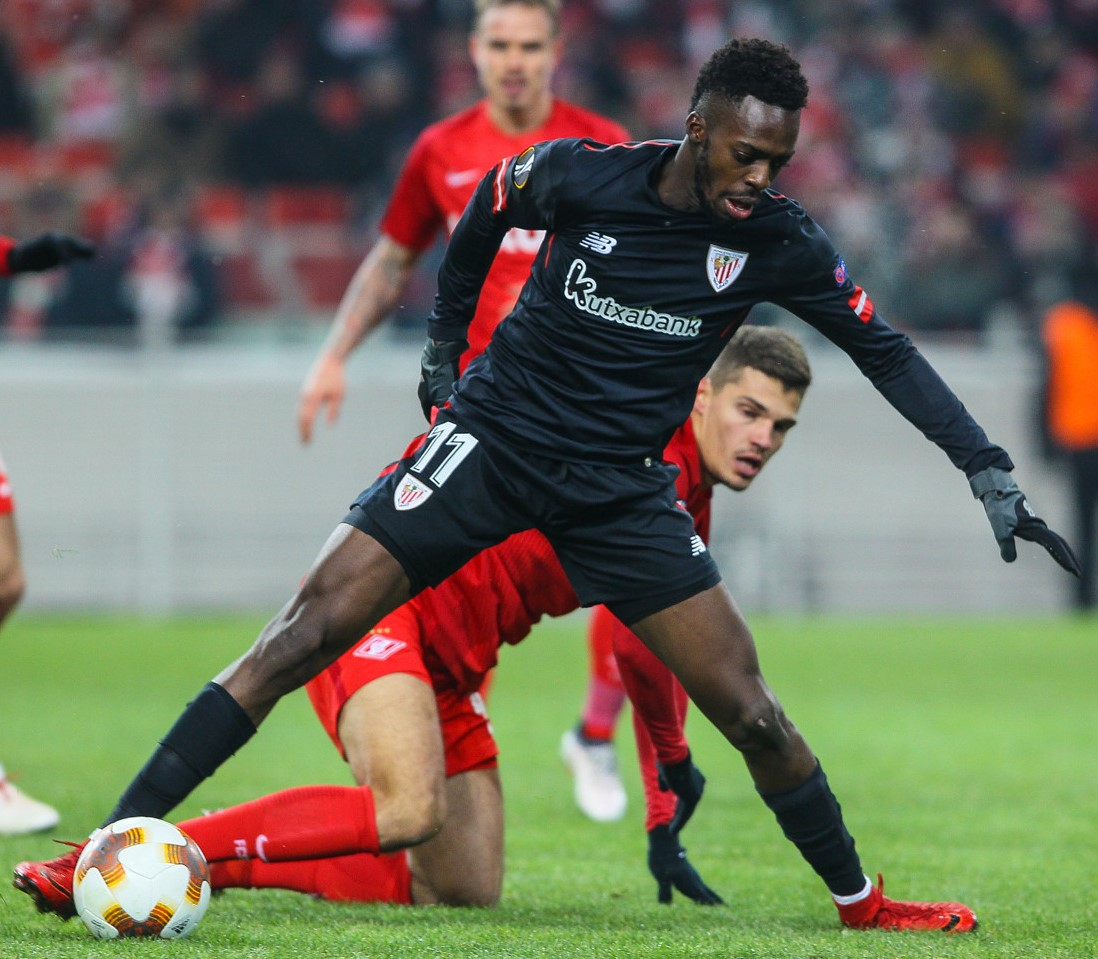
Williams playing for Athletic Bilbao in 2018

Williams signed a nine-year contract in August 2019, with his release clause set at €135 million. Later that month, he started and scored in a 2–0 Basque derby win for his 122nd consecutive Spanish League game, setting a new record by an outfield player in the 21st century ahead of goalkeeper Diego López. On 24 November, he repeated the feat in a 2–1 away victory against Osasuna, breaking a 31–game undefeated streak of the hosts at their El Sadar Stadium; the occasion also marked his 133rd consecutive appearance in the Spanish top tier, establishing a new club record previously held by Carmelo Cedrún.

On 17 January 2021, Williams scored from 20 metres early into extra time of an eventual 3–2 win over Barcelona in the 2021 Supercopa de España final. On 11 September, he celebrated his 300th appearance for Athletic with a goal in a 2–0 victory against Mallorca. A week later, he became the second player to play in 200 successive Spanish league games as he started in a 0–0 draw away to defending champions Atlético Madrid. On 1 October, he set a new record outright with his 203rd consecutive match in the home fixture with Alavés, breaking the mark set by Juan Antonio Larrañaga of Real Sociedad between 1986 and 1992.

On 17 April 2022, after starting against Celta de Vigo, Williams passed the six-year mark since he last missed a league match for the club, and extended his own Spanish top-flight record of consecutive games to 224. His six-year run came to an end at 251 on 29 January 2023, when he was left out of the squad for the fixture against the same opposition, a 1–0 loss.

In January 2024, having been on international duty at the 2023 Africa Cup of Nations, Williams made the journey back to Bilbao from Abidjan immediately after Ghana's early elimination from the tournament at the group stage was confirmed. He entered as a substitute during the second half of Athletic's Copa quarter-final against Barcelona and scored in extra time to help his side to a 4–2 win, and a fifth consecutive semi-final in the competition; they went on to win the trophy for the first time in 40 years.

On 24 May 2024, Athletic manager Ernesto Valverde reported that Williams had unknowingly spent the past two years of his footballing career playing with a two-centimetre long shard of glass in his foot. The glass was discovered when the latter underwent surgery to treat a painful scar on his left foot.

Williams took over from the retired Óscar de Marcos as captain ahead of the 2025–26 season; in the process, he became the first black player in the history of the club to be awarded this honour. He made his 500th competitive appearance on 14 March 2026, in a 3–0 defeat at Girona.

== International career ==
=== Spain ===
On 20 March 2015, Williams received his first international call-up, being named in Albert Celades' Spain under-21 squad for friendlies with Norway and Belarus. He made his debut on the 26th against the former, replacing goalscorer Munir El Haddadi at half-time of a 2–0 friendly win in Cartagena.

Williams was listed as one of 11 standby players for Vicente del Bosque's Spain squad at UEFA Euro 2016. He made his senior debut on 29 May, replacing fellow debutant Marco Asensio at the hour mark of a 3–1 friendly defeat of Bosnia and Herzegovina.

On 12 October 2018, Williams debuted for the Basque representative side, playing the full 90 minutes of a 4–2 win over Venezuela at the Mendizorrotza Stadium.

=== Ghana ===
Around the time of his Spain debut in 2016, Williams was also coveted by the Ghana national team, being watched by their Spanish scout Gerard Nus. In 2021, having made no competitive appearances for Spain that would have tied him to his birth country permanently, he spoke of the possibility of playing for Ghana: "My parents are from Accra and I really enjoy going. But I wasn't born or raised there, my culture's here, and there are players for whom it would mean more. I don't think it would be right to take the place of someone who really deserves to go and who feels Ghana 100%." Local media interpreted this as a rejection of any approach from the Black Stars.

Ultimately, on 5 July 2022, Williams announced that he was making himself available for the African country in time for the 2022 FIFA World Cup. In September, he received his first call-up for friendlies with Brazil and Nicaragua. He made his debut against the former, playing the second half of the 3–0 loss in Le Havre. He was selected in Ghana's squad for the finals in Qatar; within the team, he took the name "Kweku" due to the day on which he was born (Wednesday), a Ghanaian custom.

Williams scored his first goal on 17 November 2023, in a 1–0 win over Madagascar in a 2026 World Cup qualifier. He was called up for the 2023 Africa Cup of Nations in Ivory Coast (played in January 2024).

On 2 June 2026, Williams was included in Carlos Queiroz's squad for that year's World Cup. In September, he announced his international retirement.

== Personal life ==
Williams received his Basque first name in honour of a Caritas volunteer in Bilbao who helped his refugee parents after they arrived in Spain in the year he was born. They had been advised by an unidentified lawyer to claim to be from a war-torn country, namely Liberia where a civil war was occurring, when they first entered the country. His younger brother, Nico, is also a footballer and a forward; he too was brought up at Athletic Bilbao.

Williams was one of the stars of the Amazon Prime television documentary series Six Dreams, recorded during the 2017–18 season. He can speak Spanish, Akan and Basque. In 2021, he said that he and his family had lost fluency in English, but still communicated with relatives in the Twi dialect of Akan.

Williams married Patricia Morales at Begoña Basilica in Bilbao on 1 June 2024.

== Career statistics ==
=== Club ===
As of match played 20 November 2026

Appearances and goals by club, season and competition
Club	Season	League			Copa del Rey		Europe		Other		Total	
Club	Season	League	Apps	Goals	Apps	Goals	Apps	Goals	Apps	Goals	Apps	Goals
Basconia	2013–14	Tercera División	18	7	—		—		—		18	7
Bilbao Athletic	2013–14	Segunda División B	14	8	—		—		—		14	8
Bilbao Athletic	2014–15	Segunda División B	18	13	—		—		—		18	13
Bilbao Athletic	Total		32	21	—		—		—		32	21
Athletic Bilbao	2014–15	La Liga	19	1	4	1	2 (Note: Appearances in UEFA Europa League)	1	—		25	3
Athletic Bilbao	2015–16	La Liga	25	8	5	3	7	2	0	0	37	13
Athletic Bilbao	2016–17	La Liga	38	5	3	2	8	1	—		49	8
Athletic Bilbao	2017–18	La Liga	38	7	1	0	13	3	—		52	10
Athletic Bilbao	2018–19	La Liga	38	13	3	2	—		—		41	15
Athletic Bilbao	2019–20	La Liga	38	6	8 (Note: Includes appearance in 2020 Copa del Rey final (played in 2021))	3 (Note: The Athletic Bilbao website credits Williams with one additional goal against Barcelona in the 2019–20 Copa del Rey quarter-finals, as initially reported in several media reports of the fixture; however, it was recorded in the official match report as a Sergio Busquets own goal, with video footage of the incident inconclusive.)	—		—		46	9
Athletic Bilbao	2020–21	La Liga	38	6	6	1	—		2 (Note: Appearance(s) in Supercopa de España)	1	46	8
Athletic Bilbao	2021–22	La Liga	38	8	4	0	—		2	0	44	8
Athletic Bilbao	2022–23	La Liga	36	10	6	1	—		—		42	11
Athletic Bilbao	2023–24	La Liga	34	12	5	2	—		—		39	14
Athletic Bilbao	2024–25	La Liga	35	6	2	0	12	5	1	0	50	11
Athletic Bilbao	2025–26	La Liga	30	3	5	1	3 (Note: Appearances in UEFA Champions League)	0	1	0	39	4
Athletic Bilbao	2026–27	La Liga	12	3	0	0	—		—		12	3
Athletic Bilbao	Total		419	88	52	16	45	12	6	1	522	117
Career total			469	116	52	16	45	12	6	1	572	145

=== International ===
Appearances and goals by national team and year
National team	Year	Apps	Goals
Spain	2016	1	0
Ghana	2022	6	0
Ghana	2023	7	1
Ghana	2024	8	0
Ghana	2025	4	1
Ghana	2026	3	0
Ghana	Total	28	2
Career total		29	2

Scores and results list Ghana's goal tally first, score column indicates score after each Williams goal.

List of international goals scored by Iñaki Williams
No.	Date	Venue	Opponent	Score	Result	Competition	Ref.
1	17 November 2023	Baba Yara Sports Stadium, Kumasi, Ghana	Madagascar	1–0	1–0	2026 FIFA World Cup qualification	
2	21 March 2025	Accra Sports Stadium, Accra, Ghana	Chad	2–0	5–0	2026 FIFA World Cup qualification	

== Honours ==
Athletic Bilbao

- Copa del Rey: 2023–24; runner-up 2014–15, 2019–20, 2020–21
- Supercopa de España: 2021

Spain U21

- UEFA European Under-21 Championship runner-up: 2017

Individual

- La Liga Player of the Month: January 2019
- La Liga African MVP: 2023–24, 2024–25
- La Liga Mid-Season African MVP: 2022–23
- Golden Goal of the Season: 2018–19

== See also ==
- Afro-Spaniards
- List of association footballers who have been capped for two senior national teams
