= Football Federation of the Region of Murcia =

- Abbreviation: FFRM
- Formation: 1924
- Purpose: Football Association
- Headquarters: Murcia
- Location: Region of Murcia, Spain
- President: José Miguel Monje Carrillo
- Website: ffrm.es

The Football Federation of the Region of Murcia (Spanish: Federación de Fútbol de la Región de Murcia; FFRM) is a regional association under the control of the Royal Spanish Football Federation (RFEF), which organises official competitions within the Murcia region of Spain, including football, futsal and beach soccer. The FFRM was founded in 1924, and has its headquarters located in Murcia.

== History ==
Before the creation of the Football Association in the Region of Murcia, in 1919 the Valencian Football Federation, which had previously been responsible for clubs in the regions of Murcia and Albacete, was renamed Football Federation Levant, also called Federation Levantina. Teams playing in this federation came from the regions of Valencia (the provinces of Castellón, Valencia and Alicante) and Murcia (the provinces of Murcia and Albacete). It was responsible for organizing the Levante Football Championship and for convening the Levante football team.

On 27 July 1924, two clubs, Murcia and Albacete, seceded from the Levantina Federation on September 7, 1924, creating the Murcia Regional Federation Club-Foot ball, which changed its name to the term "Foot-ball" in 1941, and remained under that name until 1990 when it adopted the current name.

At first it contained 29 clubs from 17 towns in Murcia and Albacete. In 1928 the territorial scope of the new federation was extended to cover most of the clubs in the province of Alicante. It further expanded in 1932 to cover the province of Almeria, and in 1933 those in the regions of Baza Granada and La Sagra.

The scope of the Federation was reduced in 1939 with the Almerian and Granadan clubs joining the Andalusia Football Federation, and was further reduced in size in 1977 with the removal of most of the clubs from Alicante and Valencia provinces. The Albacete clubs left to join the newly created Football Federation of Castilla La Mancha in 1986. Finally, with the incorporation of the clubs south of the province of Alicante into the Valencian Federation 1990, the Murcian Federation was restricted to the territory of the Murcia Autonomous Region, adopting the official name of the Football Federation of Murcia.

== Committees ==
In turn, the Football Association in the Region of Murcia is divided into various committees:

- Football referees - responsible for supervising football referees in the Region of Murcia, either teaching classes to new referees or assistant referees.
- Coaches - responsible for supervising coaches in the Region of Murcia.
- School Coaches - responsible for teaching new coaches in the Region of Murcia.
- Futsal - responsible for organizing or protecting football competitions in the Region of Murcia.
- Futsal Referees - responsible for leading futsal referees in the Region of Murcia.
- Antiviolence

== See also ==
- Region of Murcia autonomous football team
