= Castilla–La Mancha Football Federation =

Spanish football association

- Abbreviation: FFCM
- Formation: 1926
- Headquarters: Cuenca
- Location: Castilla–La Mancha, Spain
- President: Pablo Burillo Cabañero
- Website: www.ffcm.es

The Castilla–La Mancha Football Federation (Spanish: Federación de Fútbol de Castilla-La Mancha; FFCM) is the football association responsible for all competitions of any form of football developed in Castilla–La Mancha. It is integrated into the Royal Spanish Football Federation and its headquarters are located in Cuenca.

== Competitions ==
- Men's
  - Tercera Federación (Group 18)
  - Primera Autonómica Preferente (2 groups)
  - Primera División Autonómica (4 group)
  - Segunda División Autonómica (5 group)
- Youth
  - Liga Nacional Juvenil Group XV
  - Divisiones Regionales
- Women's
  - Divisiones Regionales

== See also ==
- List of Spanish regional football federations
