= Royal Madrid Football Federation =

Governing body of football in the Community of Madrid, Spain

- Abbreviation: RFFM
- Formation: 1913
- Purpose: Football Association
- Headquarters: Madrid
- Location: Community of Madrid, Spain
- President: Francisco Díez Ibáñez
- Website: www.rffm.es

The Royal Madrid Football Federation (Spanish: Real Federación de Fútbol de Madrid; RFFM) is the governing body of the sport of football in the Community of Madrid, Spain. Its headquarters are in the city of Madrid.

== Functions ==
Below the national level competitions controlled by the Royal Spanish Football Federation (RFEF), the Madrid Federation has various functions, including administering:

- Group 7 of the Tercera División RFEF (fifth level of the men's Spanish football league system)
- Further men's regional divisions headed by the Categoría Preferente
- The region's qualifying tournament for the Copa Federación de España
- A group in the Spanish Women's regional leagues
- Group 12 of the Liga Nacional Juvenil de Fútbol (second tier of youth football)
- Several other regional leagues and cups in the pyramid systems of each youth age level
- Various men's and women's age-group representative squads competing in nationwide contests
- An amateur-level selection competing in the Spanish stage of the UEFA Regions' Cup
- The Madrid autonomous football team - a squad of professionals which plays occasional friendly matches against FIFA international teams or fellow Spanish regional teams.

== History ==
Founded in 1913 as the Centre Regional Federation (Spanish: Federación Regional Centro), the new organisation replaced the casual Madrid Association of Foot-ball Clubs which had been formed a decade earlier, between 1902 and 1904. The Centro Federation, expanded to include the wider Castile region but always dominated by clubs from the capital, particularly Real Madrid CF, took over the running of the existing Madrid regional championship, the local league competition in which the best-placed teams qualified for the Copa del Rey each year until these were disbanded in 1940. Centro also played regional representative matches, mostly friendlies but they also participated in the Prince of Asturias Cup between 1915 and 1924, and winning twice, in 1917 and 1918, their most frequent opponent being Catalonia.

In 1932, the name changed to the Castilian Football Federation which remained in place until 1988, when separate federations were created for the established autonomous communities of Spain, therefore Castile and León, Castilla–La Mancha and Madrid have had different governing bodies since then.

To celebrate the federation's centenary in 2013, a match was played between Madrid and the Andalusia autonomous football team, the same opposition as for its 'golden jubilee' in 1963. However, matches are rarely played by the Madrid XI and other regions as such fixtures have not proven cost-effective to arrange, other than for the regions such as Catalonia and the Basque Country with leanings towards independence whose matches draw larger crowds.
