= Extremaduran Football Federation =

- Abbreviation: FEF
- Formation: 1924
- Purpose: Football Association
- Headquarters: Badajoz
- Location: Extremadura, Spain
- President: Pedro Rocha Junco
- Website: www.fexfutbol.com

The Extremaduran Football Federation (Spanish: Federación Extremeña de Fútbol; FEXF) is the football association responsible for all competitions of any form of football developed in Extremadura. It is integrated into the Royal Spanish Football Federation and its headquarters are located in Badajoz.

== Competitions ==
- Men's
  - Tercera Federación (Group 14)
  - Primera Extremeña (variable groups)
  - Segunda Extremeña (variable groups)
- Youth
  - Liga Nacional Juvenil Group XI
  - Divisiones Regionales
- Women's
  - Divisiones Regionales

== See also ==
- List of Spanish regional football federations
