= Xavier Estrada Fernández =

Spanish football referee

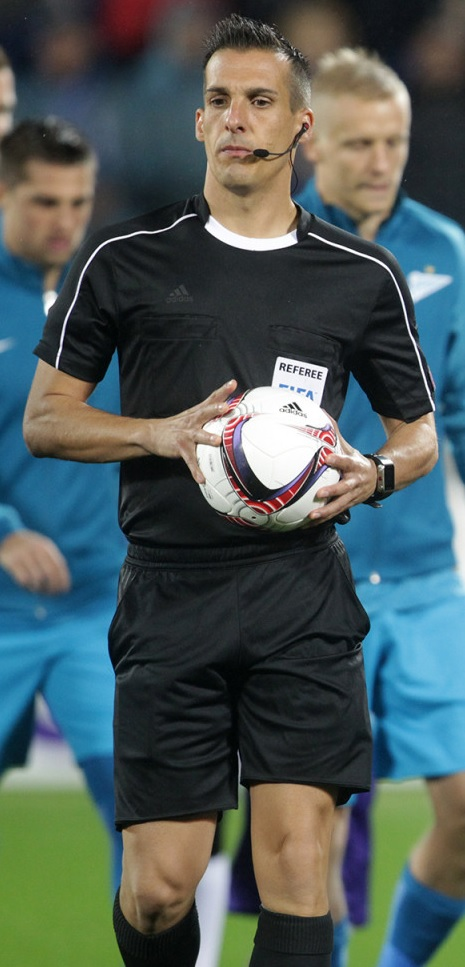
- Born: 27 January 1976 (age 50); Lleida, Spain
- Other occupation: Civil servant

Domestic
Years	League	Role
2009–2021	La Liga	Referee

International
Years	League	Role
2013-2021;	FIFA listed	Referee

Xavier Estrada Fernández (born 27 January 1976) is a former Spanish professional football referee and politician. He has been a full international for FIFA since 2011.

On 24 May 2019, Fernández refereed the match between Ararat-Armenia and Artsakh in the Armenian Premier League.

== Political career ==
In the 2023 Spanish local elections, he was elected as a councillor of the Lleida City Council representing the Republican Left of Catalonia.
