= Aitor Iru =

Spanish footballer and coach

Personal information
- Full name: Aitor Iruarrizaga Amarika
- Date of birth: 29 July 1968 (age 58)
- Place of birth: Bilbao, Spain
- Height: 1.87 m (6 ft 2 in)
- Position: Goalkeeper

Team information
- Current team: Athletic Bilbao (goalkeeping coach)

Senior career*
Years	Team	Apps	(Gls)
1989–1991	Barakaldo	57	(0)
1991–1993	Bilbao Athletic	45	(0)
1993–1995	Compostela	75	(0)
1995–1996	Mérida	0	(0)
1996–1998	Almería	41	(0)
1998–2002	SD Eibar	47	(0)
2002–2006	Amurrio	18	(0)
Total		283	(0)

Managerial career
- 2008–2009: Bilbao Athletic (goalkeeping coach)
- 2011–2017: Athletic Bilbao (goalkeeping coach)
- 2017–2018: Bilbao Athletic (goalkeeping coach)
- 2018–: Athletic Bilbao (goalkeeping coach)
- * Club domestic league appearances and goals

Aitor Iruarrizaga Amarika (born 29 July 1968), known as Aitor Iru, is a Spanish retired footballer who played as a goalkeeper, and is the goalkeeping coach of Athletic Bilbao.

== Playing career ==
Iru was born in Bilbao in the province of Biscay, in the Basque Country, and began his career with Biscayan club Barakaldo. After two seasons with Barakaldo in Segunda División B, he joined local giants Athletic Bilbao in 1991. He spent two seasons playing for the B team in the Segunda División, but never appeared for the first team, and left to sign for second tier rivals Compostela in 1993. In his first season, Compostela achieved promotion to La Liga for the first time in their history after winning a playoff. He continued to be first choice in 1994–95, making 37 top flight appearances as Compostela avoided relegation. He joined fellow first division club Mérida in the summer of 1995, but made only 4 appearances during his sole season with the club, all in the Copa del Rey.

Mérida were relegated in 1996, and Iru left the club that summer to sign for Almería in the Segunda División. He spent two seasons with Almería, in the first of which they were relegated to Segunda División B. He joined Eibar in 1998, where he played in the second tier for four seasons before signing for Segunda División B side Amurrio in 2002, where he finished his career.

== Coaching career ==
Iru returned to Bilbao Athletic in 2008, becoming their goalkeeping coach, a position he held for one season. He made another return to the club in 2011, this time becoming goalkeeping coach for the first team, replacing Luis Llopis. In July 2017, Cuco Ziganda, who had until then been coaching the B team, replaced Ernesto Valverde as Athletic manager. Ziganda brought Imanol Etxeberria with him as goalkeeping coach so he and Etxeberria swapped places, Iru returning to the B team.

In December 2018, B team coach Gaizka Garitano followed Ziganda's path by being promoted to first team manager, replacing Eduardo Berizzo. Like Ziganda, he chose to bring his goalkeeping coach with him, meaning Iru was promoted to the first team once again, replacing Carlos Kisluk. As of March 2021, Iru remains in post, now working under Marcelino, who replaced Garitano in January of that year.

== Personal life ==
Iru's son Ander is also a goalkeeper, who has played for Bilbao Athletic since 2016. Ander was coached by his father during the latter's tenure as Bilbao Athletic goalkeeping coach in 2017–18. Aitor's brother Patxi Iru, older by almost six years, was also a goalkeeper, representing both Athletic Bilbao and Osasuna in La Liga. Patxi's son Jon is a midfielder, currently playing for Haro Deportivo in Segunda División B.

== Career statistics ==
Club	Season	League			Cup		Other		Total	
Club	Season	Division	Apps	Goals	Apps	Goals	Apps	Goals	Apps	Goals
Barakaldo	1989–90	Segunda División B	19	0	–		–		19	0
Barakaldo	1990–91	Segunda División B	38	0	6	0	–		44	0
Barakaldo	Total		57	0	6	0	0	0	63	0
Athletic Bilbao B	1991–92	Segunda División	8	0	–		–		8	0
Athletic Bilbao B	1992–93	Segunda División	37	0	–		–		37	0
Athletic Bilbao B	Total		45	0	0	0	0	0	45	0
Compostela	1993–94	Segunda División	38	0	0	0	3	0	41	0
Compostela	1994–95	La Liga	37	0	4	0	–		41	0
Compostela	Total		75	0	4	0	3	0	82	0
Mérida	1995–96	La Liga	0	0	4	0	–		4	0
Almería	1996–97	Segunda División	35	0	2	0	–		37	0
Almería	1997–98	Segunda División B	6	0	0	0	–		6	0
Almería	Total		41	0	2	0	0	0	43	0
SD Eibar	1998–99	Segunda División	24	0	0	0	–		24	0
SD Eibar	1999–2000	Segunda División	13	0	3	0	–		16	0
SD Eibar	2000–01	Segunda División	2	0	1	0	–		3	0
SD Eibar	2001–02	Segunda División	8	0	1	0	–		9	0
SD Eibar	Total		47	0	5	0	0	0	52	0
Amurrio	2002–03	Segunda División B	17	0	0	0	–		17	0
Amurrio	2003–04	Segunda División B	1	0	–		–		1	0
Amurrio	Total		18	0	0	0	0	0	18	0
Career total			283	0	21	0	3	0	307	0

1. Appearances in the 1993–94 Segunda División promotion playoff
