= Royal Andalusian Football Federation =

Regional football federation in Spain

- Abbreviation: RFAF
- Formation: 1913; 113 years ago
- Purpose: Football Association
- Headquarters: Seville
- Location: Andalusia, Spain
- President: Eduardo Herrera Jiménez
- Website: rfaf.es (in Spanish)

The Royal Andalusian Football Federation (Spanish: Real Federación Andaluza de Fútbol; RFAF) is the football association responsible for all competitions of any form of football developed in Andalusia. It is integrated into the Royal Spanish Football Federation and its headquarters are located in Seville and has offices in the capitals of the provinces.

It originated in the so-called Federación Novena de Football Clubes headed by Francisco Javier Alba and founded on 22 February 1915, and was the organizer of the various football events occurring in the community after the boom of the game in the second decade of the 20th century, including the 'South' Championship (a regional league competition whose best teams qualified for the Copa del Rey) until the end of the 1930s. It was called Federación Regional Sur since 1916 and took its current name on 17 March 1950.

== See also ==
- Andalusia autonomous football team
- List of Spanish regional football federations
