= Royal Castile and León Football Federation =

- Abbreviation: RFCYLF
- Formation: 1923
- Headquarters: Valladolid
- Location: Castile and León, Spain
- President: Marcelino Maté Martínez
- Website: fcylf.es

The Royal Castile and León Football Federation (Spanish: Real Federación de Castilla y León de Fútbol; RFCYLF) is the delegation to RFEF of Castile and León, and is responsible for conducting the work of this organization and football events in Castile and León.

It was founded in 1923 under the name Federación Regional Castellano Leonesa de Clubs de Football (1923–1936). It was renamed Federación Oeste (1950–1986) and from 28 May 1986 is known today as grouping the nine provinces of Castile and León.

Recently, its headquarters have been located in Arroyo de la Encomienda (Valladolid). It is chaired by Marcelino Martinez Maté. The various committees that form are:

- The referee committee, chaired by Iñaki Sáez Morgotón.
- The coaches committee, chaired by Maria Alfonso Garcia Varas.
- Football and futsal committee.

The federation has 9 regional branches and 2 sub-delegations, located in Miranda de Ebro and Ponferrada. In 1998, on the occasion of the 75th anniversary of its foundation, organized the first game of the senior team against the Aragon official football team, in a game in Soria.

== Presidents ==
- Salvador Covelo (1923–1932)
- Antonio Villalón (1950–)
- Ramón Burrieza (–)
- Benito Zafra Martín (–1987)
- Mario Luis Morán (1987–1996)
- Marcelino Maté Martínez (1996–)

== See also ==
- Castile and León autonomous football team
- Divisiones Regionales de Fútbol in Castile and León
