= 2008–09 UD Almería season =

UD Almería
2008–09 season
- President: Alfonso García
- Head coach: Gonzalo Arconada (until 21 December); Hugo Sánchez (from 23 December)
- Stadium: Juegos Mediterráneos
- La Liga: 11th
- Copa del Rey: Round of 16
- Top goalscorer: League: Álvaro Negredo (19); All: Álvaro Negredo (19)
- Highest home attendance: 21,000 vs. Real Madrid (2 Nov)
- Lowest home attendance: 7,500 vs. Espanyol (23 May)
Home colours	Away colours

In the 2008–09 season, UD Almería played in two competitions: La Liga and the Copa del Rey. It was their second season in the top flight since promotion from the 2006–07 Segunda División.

== Squad ==
Retrieved on 14 December 2020

Note: Flags indicate national team as defined under FIFA eligibility rules; some limited exceptions apply. Players may hold more than one non-FIFA nationality.

No.	Pos.	Nation	Player
1	GK	BRA	Diego Alves
2	DF	ESP	Bruno
3	DF	BRA	Guilherme Santos
5	FW	NGA	Kalu Uche
6	MF	BRA	Iriney
7	MF	ESP	Miguel Ángel Nieto
8	MF	ESP	Albert Crusat
9	FW	ESP	Álvaro Negredo
9	FW	ARG	Esteban Solari
10	MF	ESP	José Ortiz (captain)
11	FW	ARG	Pablo Piatti
12	DF	ESP	Chico
13	GK	ESP	Esteban

No.	Pos.	Nation	Player
14	MF	ESP	Julio Álvarez
15	MF	ESP	Corona
16	DF	BRA	Michel Macedo
17	MF	ESP	Juanma Ortiz
18	DF	PER	Santiago Acasiete
21	DF	ESP	Carlos García
22	DF	ESP	Mané
23	MF	ESP	Fernando Soriano
24	DF	ESP	Juanito
25	DF	ARG	Hernán Pellerano
26	GK	ESP	Álvaro
—	FW	ESP	Natalio

=== Out on loan ===
Note: Flags indicate national team as defined under FIFA eligibility rules; some limited exceptions apply. Players may hold more than one non-FIFA nationality.

No. / Pos. / Nation / Player; — / DF / ESP / Domingo Cisma (on loan at Numancia)	No. / Pos. / Nation / Player; — / FW / ESP / David Rodríguez (on loan at Celta Vigo)

=== Almería B players ===
Retrieved on 15 December 2020

Note: Flags indicate national team as defined under FIFA eligibility rules; some limited exceptions apply. Players may hold more than one non-FIFA nationality.

No.	Pos.	Nation	Player
29	DF	ESP	Ángel Trujillo
—	DF	ESP	Fran González
—	DF	ESP	Gabi Ramos
—	DF	ESP	Trini
—	MF	ESP	Antonio Cobos
—	MF	ESP	Javi Fernández

No.	Pos.	Nation	Player
—	MF	ESP	José Galán
—	MF	ESP	Borja Prieto
—	MF	ESP	Pepe Vergara
—	FW	ESP	Javi Amaya
—	FW	ESP	Kike
—	FW	ESP	Javi López

== Transfers ==
=== In ===
#	Pos	Player	From	Notes
Summer
7	MF	(Spain) Miguel Ángel Nieto	(Spain) Real Madrid Castilla	Free transfer
9	FW	(Argentina) Esteban Solari	(Mexico) U.N.A.M.	€3.8 million
11	FW	(Argentina) Pablo Piatti	(Argentina) Estudiantes	€7 million
12	DF	(Spain) Chico	(Spain) Cádiz	
13	GK	(Spain) Esteban	(Spain) Celta Vigo	
14	MF	(Spain) Julio Álvarez	(Spain) CD Numancia	Free transfer
16	DF	(Brazil) Michel Macedo	(Brazil) Flamengo	
25	DF	(Argentina) Hernán Pellerano	(Argentina) Vélez Sarsfield	€3 million
	FW	(Spain) Natalio	(Spain) Cádiz	Loan return
	FW	(Spain) David Rodríguez	(Spain) Salamanca	€400,000

=== Out ===
#	Pos	Player	To	Notes
Summer
3	DF	(Spain) Aitor López Rekarte	Released^{a}	
4	MF	(Brazil) Felipe Melo	(Italy) Fiorentina	€13 million
7	FW	(Serbia) Veljko Paunović	(Serbia) Partizan	
11	DF	(Spain) Domingo Cisma	(Spain) Numancia	Loan
13	GK	(Spain) David Cobeño	(Spain) Sevilla	Loan return
14	DF	(Spain) Rubén Pulido	(Spain) Real Zaragoza	
16	FW	(Spain) Mario Bermejo	(Spain) Xerez	
25	GK	(Spain) Aitor Alcalde	(Spain) Lemona	
	FW	(Spain) David Rodríguez	(Spain) Celta Vigo	Loan
Winter
	FW	(Spain) Natalio	(Spain) Córdoba	Loan

^a López Rekarte was subsequently signed by Eibar in March 2009.

== Player statistics ==
=== Squad stats ===
Last updated on 7 December 2020.

No.	Pos	Nat	Player	Total		La Liga		Copa del Rey	
No.	Pos	Nat	Player	Apps	Goals	Apps	Goals	Apps	Goals
1	GK	(Brazil) BRA	Diego Alves	31	0	31	0	0	0
2	DF	(Spain) ESP	Bruno	37	0	34	0	1+2	0
3	DF	(Brazil) BRA	Guilherme Santos	11	0	6+1	0	4	0
5	FW	(Nigeria) NGA	Kalu Uche	30	8	17+10	8	3	0
6	MF	(Brazil) BRA	Iriney	20	0	17+1	0	1+1	0
7	MF	(Spain) ESP	Miguel Ángel Nieto	11	1	4+6	1	0+1	0
8	MF	(Spain) ESP	Albert Crusat	30	1	24+6	1	0	0
9	FW	(Spain) ESP	Álvaro Negredo	35	19	34	19	1	0
9	FW	(Argentina) ARG	Esteban Solari	12	3	2+6	1	3+1	2
10	MF	(Spain) ESP	José Ortiz	29	3	3+22	0	4	3
11	FW	(Argentina) ARG	Pablo Piatti	33	6	19+12	5	2	1
12	DF	(Spain) ESP	Chico	23	1	15+5	1	3	0
13	GK	(Spain) ESP	Esteban	11	0	7	0	4	0
14	MF	(Spain) ESP	Julio Álvarez	23	0	17+4	0	2	0
15	MF	(Spain) ESP	Corona	31	2	16+14	1	0+1	1
16	DF	(Brazil) BRA	Michel Macedo	4	0	1+1	0	2	0
17	MF	(Spain) ESP	Juanma Ortiz	35	4	31+1	4	2+1	0
18	DF	(Peru) PER	Santiago Acasiete	19	1	17	1	2	0
21	DF	(Spain) ESP	Carlos García	22	0	18+1	0	3	0
22	DF	(Spain) ESP	Mané	33	1	31+1	1	1	0
23	MF	(Spain) ESP	Fernando Soriano	26	1	17+7	1	1+1	0
24	DF	(Spain) ESP	Juanito	33	0	27+3	0	2+1	0
25	DF	(Argentina) ARG	Hernán Pellerano	31	1	30+1	1	0	0
26	GK	(Spain) ESP	Álvaro	0	0	0	0	0	0
Players who have left the club after the start of the season:
	FW	(Spain) ESP	Natalio	12	0	0+9	0	3	0

=== Top scorers ===
Updated on 11 December 2020

Place	Position	Nation	Number	Name	La Liga	Copa del Rey	Total
1	FW	(Spain)	9	Álvaro Negredo	19	0	19
2	FW	(Nigeria)	5	Kalu Uche	8	0	8
3	FW	(Argentina)	11	Pablo Piatti	5	1	6
4	MF	(Spain)	17	Juanma Ortiz	4	0	4
5	FW	(Argentina)	9	Esteban Solari	1	2	3
5	MF	(Spain)	10	José Ortiz	0	3	3
7	MF	(Spain)	15	Corona	1	1	2
8	MF	(Spain)	7	Miguel Ángel Nieto	1	0	1
8	MF	(Spain)	8	Albert Crusat	1	0	1
8	DF	(Spain)	12	Chico	1	0	1
8	DF	(Peru)	18	Santiago Acasiete	1	0	1
8	DF	(Spain)	22	Mané	1	0	1
8	MF	(Spain)	23	Fernando Soriano	1	0	1
8	DF	(Argentina)	25	Hernán Pellerano	1	0	1
				TOTALS	45	7	52

=== Disciplinary record ===
Updated on 15 December 2020

Number	Nation	Position	Name	La Liga		Copa del Rey		Total	
Number	Nation	Position	Name	Booked	Sent off (straight red)	Booked	Sent off (straight red)	Booked	Sent off (straight red)
22	(Spain)	DF	Mané	9	1	0	0	9	1
21	(Spain)	DF	Carlos García	10	0	0	0	10	0
9	(Spain)	FW	Álvaro Negredo	7	2	0	0	7	2
8	(Spain)	MF	Albert Crusat	8	1	0	0	8	1
2	(Spain)	DF	Bruno	6	1	1	0	7	1
17	(Spain)	MF	Juanma Ortiz	7	0	1	0	8	0
25	(Argentina)	DF	Hernán Pellerano	5	2	0	0	5	2
24	(Spain)	DF	Juanito	7	0	0	0	7	0
6	(Brazil)	MF	Iriney	6	0	0	0	6	0
23	(Spain)	MF	Fernando Soriano	6	0	0	0	6	0
3	(Brazil)	DF	Guilherme Santos	3	1	0	1	3	2
5	(Nigeria)	FW	Kalu Uche	2	2	1	0	3	2
10	(Spain)	MF	José Ortiz	2	1	1	0	3	1
12	(Spain)	DF	Chico	3	1	0	0	3	1
1	(Brazil)	GK	Diego Alves	3	0	0	0	3	0
11	(Argentina)	FW	Pablo Piatti	2	0	1	0	3	0
18	(Peru)	DF	Santiago Acasiete	3	0	0	0	3	0
9	(Argentina)	FW	Esteban Solari	0	0	2	0	2	0
13	(Spain)	GK	Esteban	1	0	1	0	2	0
15	(Spain)	MF	Corona	2	0	0	0	2	0
	(Spain)	FW	Natalio	1	0	1	0	2	0
7	(Spain)	MF	Miguel Ángel Nieto	1	0	0	0	1	0
14	(Spain)	MF	Julio Álvarez	1	0	0	0	1	0
			TOTALS	95	12	9	1	104	13

== Season Results ==
=== Preseason ===
23 August 2008 Trofeo Memorial; Juan Rojas	Almería	3 – 1	Real Betis	Almería, Spain
21:00	Ju. Ortiz 26'; Negredo 29' (pen.); Piatti 73'	Report	52' Caffa	Stadium: Estadio de los Juegos Mediterráneos

25 August 2008	Lorca Deportiva	1 – 3	Almería	Lorca, Spain
	Perona 57'	Report	39' García; 70' Crusat; 75' Mané	Stadium: Francisco Artés Carrasco

=== La Liga ===
Pos	Team	Pld	W	D	L	GF	GA	GD	Pts	Qualification or relegation
9	Mallorca	38	14	9	15	53	60	−7	51	
10	Espanyol	38	12	11	15	46	49	−3	47	
11	Almería	38	13	7	18	45	61	−16	46 (Note: ALM 1–1 RAC; RAC 0–2 ALM)	
12	Racing Santander	38	12	10	16	49	48	+1	46	
13	Athletic Bilbao	38	12	8	18	47	62	−15	44	Qualification for the Europa League third qualifying round (Note: Since Barcelona, winners of the 2008–09 Copa del Rey, already qualified for the 2009–10 UEFA Champions League, losing cup finalists Athletic Bilbao earned a spot in the third qualifying round of the 2009–10 UEFA Europa League.)

Source: LFP and Yahoo! Sport
Rules for classification: 1) points; 2) head-to-head points; 3) head-to-head goal difference; 4) head-to-head goals scored; 5) goal difference; 6) number of goals scored.

==== Results summary ====
Overall								Home						Away					
Pld	W	D	L	GF	GA	GD	Pts	W	D	L	GF	GA	GD	W	D	L	GF	GA	GD
38	13	7	18	45	61	−16	46	11	4	4	27	20	+7	2	3	14	18	41	−23

Last updated: 16 December 2020.

==== Matches ====
31 August 2008 1	Athletic Bilbao	1 – 3	Almería	Bilbao, Spain
18:00	Llorente (yellow card) 33'; Martínez (yellow card) 45'; Vélez 57'; Yeste (penalty missed) 68'	Report	7' Pellerano; (yellow card) 29' Alves; 33' Negredo; 50' Ju. Ortiz; (yellow card) 67' Bruno; (yellow card) 86' Uche; (yellow card) 89' Crusat	Stadium: San Mamés; Attendance: 35,000; Referee: Fernando Teixeira Vitienes

14 September 2008 2	Almería	2 – 2	Valencia	Almería, Spain
20:00	Piatti 20'; Mané (yellow card) 36'; Negredo 39'; Juanito (yellow card) 89'	Report	35' (yellow card) 60' Alexis; 68' Villa	Stadium: Estadio de los Juegos Mediterráneos; Attendance: 15,000; Referee: Carlos Velasco Carballo

21 September 2008 3	Almería	1 – 0	Málaga	Almería, Spain
16:00	Mané (yellow card) 61'; Negredo 75'; Jo. Ortiz (red card) 86'	Report	(yellow card) 21' Pablo; (yellow card) 27' Cuadrado; (yellow card) 32' Gámez; (yellow card) 70' Calleja; (red card) 80' Miguel Ángel	Stadium: Estadio de los Juegos Mediterráneos; Attendance: 18,000; Referee: Manuel Mejuto González

25 September 2008 4	Real Valladolid	2 – 0	Almería	Valladolid, Spain
19:00	Prieto (yellow card) 31'; Baraja (yellow card) 59'; Rubio 67' (yellow card) (yellow-red card) 85'; Medunjanin 90'	Report	(yellow card) 83' Crusat; (yellow card) 90' García	Stadium: José Zorrilla; Attendance: 14,300; Referee: Bernardino González Vázquez

28 September 2008 5	Almería	1 – 0	Recreativo de Huelva	Almería, Spain
16:00	Negredo 90'; Chico (yellow card) 90'	Report	(yellow card) (yellow-red card) 80' Vázquez; (yellow card) (yellow-red card) 84' Oliveira; (yellow card) 86' Riesgo; (yellow card) (yellow-red card) 90' Sisi	Stadium: Estadio de los Juegos Mediterráneos; Attendance: 11,035; Referee: Carlos Clos

5 October 2008 6	Getafe	2 – 2	Almería	Getafe, Spain
16:00	Díaz (yellow card) 44'; Belenguer (yellow card) 59'; Uche 69'; Casquero 71'	Report	(yellow card) 45' Ju. Ortiz; (yellow card) 83' Pellerano; 87' Negredo; 90' Chico	Stadium: Coliseum Alfonso Pérez; Attendance: 8,000; Referee: Antonio Mateu

19 October 2008 7	Almería	0 – 1	Sevilla	Almería, Spain
20:00	Natalio (yellow card) 72'	Report	52' Adriano; (yellow card) 64' Navas; (yellow card) 77' Romaric; (yellow card) 90' Fernando Rodríguez	Stadium: Estadio de los Juegos Mediterráneos; Attendance: 12,051; Referee: Arturo Daudén Ibáñez

25 October 2008 8	Barcelona	5 – 0	Almería	Barcelona, Spain
21:00	Eto'o 4', 21', 24'; Henry 13'; Alves 37'	Report	(red card) 30' Negredo; (yellow card) 44' Ju. Ortiz; (yellow card) 79' Soriano	Stadium: Camp Nou; Attendance: 63,566; Referee: Alfonso Pérez

2 November 2008 9	Almería	1 – 1	Real Madrid	Almería, Spain
18:00	Uche (yellow card) 55'; Juanito (yellow card) 60'; Piatti 81'; Negredo (yellow card) 90'; Soriano (yellow card) 90'	Report	38' Raúl; (yellow card) 61' Sneijder; (yellow card) 90' Casillas	Stadium: Estadio de los Juegos Mediterráneos; Attendance: 21,000; Referee: Bernardino González Vázquez

9 November 2008 10	Villarreal	2 – 1	Almería	Villarreal, Spain
16:00	Rossi 1' (yellow card) 44'; Llorente 15'; López (yellow card) 20'; Soriano (yellow card) 29'; Capdevila (yellow card) 90'	Report	61' Piatti; (yellow card) 75' Pellerano; (yellow card) 84' Juanito	Stadium: Estadio El Madrigal; Attendance: 20,000; Referee: Julián Rodríguez Santiago

16 November 2008 11	Almería	2 – 1	Real Mallorca	Almería, Spain
16:00	Negredo 44', 67' (pen.); Santos (yellow card) 71'	Report	(yellow card) 17' Corrales; (yellow card) 64' Josemi; 90' Keita	Stadium: Estadio de los Juegos Mediterráneos; Attendance: 16,000; Referee: Javier Turienzo Álvarez

23 November 2008 12	Osasuna	3 – 1	Almería	Pamplona, Spain
16:00	Azpilicueta (yellow card) 6'; Pandiani 13'; Flaño (yellow card) 41'; Pellerano 71' (o.g.); Juanfran (yellow card) 85'; Vadócz 90'	Report	7' (pen.) Negredo; (red card) 8' Santos; (yellow card) 30' Mané; (yellow card) 55' Juanito	Stadium: Reyno de Navarra; Attendance: 17,000; Referee: Carlos Megía Dávila

30 November 2008 13	Almería	0 – 1	Deportivo La Coruña	Almería, Spain
16:00	Crusat (yellow card) 53'; Negredo (red card) 53'; García (yellow card) 60'	Report	(yellow card) 17' Lopo; (yellow card) 48' Lafita; (yellow card) 60' Mista; (penalty missed) 68' 76' Verdú; (yellow card) 77' Tomás; (yellow card) 90' Riki	Stadium: Estadio de los Juegos Mediterráneos; Attendance: 12,000; Referee: Eduardo Iturralde González

7 December 2008 14	Numancia	2 – 1	Almería	Soria, Spain
16:00	Juan Pablo (yellow card) 10'; Ortega (yellow card) 14' del Pino 19'; Barkero (yellow card) 21' (red card) 68'; Goiria 51' (yellow card) 83'	Report	11' (pen.) Solari; (yellow card) 21' Ju. Ortiz; (yellow card) 36' Alves; (yellow card) 59' Piatti; (yellow card) 60' Santos; (yellow card) 69' García	Stadium: Los Pajaritos; Attendance: 8,000; Referee: César Muñiz Fernández

14 December 2008 15	Almería	1 – 1	Racing Santander	Almería, Spain
16:00	Álvarez (yellow card) 26'; Acasiete (yellow card) 31' (goal) 62'; Crusat (yellow card) 37'; García (yellow card) 75'; Soriano (yellow card) 90'	Report	(yellow card) 3' Pereira; (yellow card) 20' Navas; (yellow card) 25' Gonçalves; 33' Garay; (yellow card) 57' Pinillos; (yellow card) (yellow-red card) 74' Lacen	Stadium: Estadio de los Juegos Mediterráneos; Attendance: 9,500; Referee: Julián Rodríguez Santiago

21 December 2008 16	Sporting de Gijón	1 – 0	Almería	Gijón, Spain
16:00	Carmelo (yellow card) 20'; Maldonado 27' (yellow card) 38'; Míchel (yellow card) 28'; Matabuena (yellow card) 44'; Cámara (yellow card) 66'	Report	(yellow card) 15' Bruno; (yellow card) 65' Juanito	Stadium: El Molinón; Attendance: 21,000; Referee: Alfonso J. Alvarez Izquierdo

4 January 2009 17	Almería	1 – 0	Real Betis	Almería, Spain
16:00	Mané (yellow card) 24'; Corona 35'; García (yellow card) 42'; Uche (red card) 87'	Report	(yellow card) 31' Capi; (red card) 90' García	Stadium: Estadio de los Juegos Mediterráneos; Attendance: 15,000; Referee: Carlos Megía Dávila

11 January 2009 18	Espanyol	2 – 2	Almería	Barcelona, Spain
18:00	Sánchez (yellow card) 57'; Martínez 62'; Pareja (yellow card) 70' (goal) 90'; Hurtado (yellow card) 77'; Chica (yellow card) 89'; Jarque (yellow card) 90'	Report	4', 54' Uche; (yellow card) 34' Corona; (yellow card) 65' Chico; (yellow card) 90' Bruno	Stadium: Estadi Olímpic Lluís Companys; Attendance: 11,325; Referee: Bernardino González Vázquez

18 January 2009 19	Almería	1 – 1	Atlético Madrid	Almería, Spain
20:00	Uche 6'; Iriney (yellow card) 38'; Pellerano (yellow card) (yellow-red card) 53'; Mané (yellow card) 62'; García (yellow card) 66'	Report	(yellow card) 14' Perea; 22' (yellow card) 37' Sinama Pongolle; (yellow card) (yellow-red card) 90' Banega	Stadium: Estadio de los Juegos Mediterráneos; Attendance: 8,000; Referee: Carlos Delgado Ferreiro

25 January 2009 20	Almería	2 – 1	Athletic Bilbao	Almería, Spain
16:00	Ju. Ortiz 26'; Uche 39'; Bruno (yellow card) 71'	Report	(yellow card) 54' Balenziaga; (yellow card) 54' J. Etxeberria; 65' del Olmo; (yellow card) 90' Ustaritz	Stadium: Estadio de los Juegos Mediterráneos; Attendance: 10,500; Referee: Antonio Mateu

1 February 2009 21	Valencia	3 – 2	Almería	Valencia, Spain
18:00	Joaquín 5'; Villa 29' (pen.), 61'; Maduro (yellow card) 34'; Baraja (yellow card) 45'; Marchena (yellow card) 64'	Report	22', 64' Negredo; (yellow card) 52' Soriano; (yellow card) 81' García	Stadium: Mestalla Stadium; Attendance: 40,000; Referee: Manuel Mejuto González

8 February 2009 22	Málaga	3 – 2	Almería	Málaga, Spain
16:00	Gámez (yellow card) 27'; A. Luque 48' (yellow card) 52'; Eliseu (yellow card) 50'; Weligton (yellow card) 53'; Duda (yellow card) 58'; Salva 64', 75'	Report	(yellow card) 22' Ju. Ortiz; 25' Uche; (yellow card) 39' Pellerano; 44' Negredo; (yellow card) 55' (red card) 84' Mané; (yellow card) 58' Crusat	Stadium: La Rosaleda; Attendance: 19,000; Referee: Miguel Pérez Lasa

15 February 2009 23	Almería	3 – 2	Real Valladolid	Almería, Spain
16:00	Iriney (yellow card) 35'; Acasiete (yellow card) 44'; Crusat 61'; Bruno (red card) 64'; Chico (yellow card) 67'; Uche 70' (red card) 77'; Negredo 78'; Alves (yellow card) 90'	Report	17' León; 22' (yellow card) 76' Goitom; (yellow card) 36' Bea; (yellow card) 72' Prieto; (yellow card) (yellow-red card) 81' Rivas	Stadium: Estadio de los Juegos Mediterráneos; Attendance: 12,000; Referee: César Muñiz Fernández

22 February 2009 24	Recreativo de Huelva	1 – 1	Almería	Huelva, Spain
16:00	Barber (yellow card) 24'; Ruben (yellow card) 39'; Camuñas 58'; Lamas (yellow card) 74'	Report	(yellow card) 14' García; (red card) 21' Crusat; 75' (pen.) Negredo; (yellow card) 83' Piatti; (yellow card) 90' Soriano	Stadium: Nuevo Colombino; Attendance: 15,689; Referee: Julián Rodríguez Santiago

1 March 2009 25	Almería	2 – 1	Getafe	Almería, Spain
16:00	Negredo 16', 64' (yellow card) 49'; Ju. Ortiz (yellow card) 32'; Crusat (yellow card) 58'; Juanito (yellow card) 66'	Report	7' Guerrón; (yellow card) 36' Polanski; (yellow card) 59' Casquero; (yellow card) 67' Mario; (yellow card) 71' Díaz; (yellow card) 90' Celestini	Stadium: Estadio de los Juegos Mediterráneos; Attendance: 15,000; Referee: Javier Turienzo Álvarez

8 March 2009 26	Sevilla	2 – 1	Almería	Seville, Spain
18:00	Kanouté 5'; Romaric (yellow card) 61'; Renato 62' (yellow card) 70'; Escudé (yellow card) 90'	Report	(yellow card) 66' Jo. Ortiz; 70' (pen.) (yellow card) 84' Negredo	Stadium: Ramón Sánchez Pizjuán; Attendance: 45,000; Referee: Antonio Rubinos Pérez

15 March 2009 27	Almería	0 – 2	Barcelona	Almería, Spain
20:00	Acasiete (yellow card) 21'; Pellerano (yellow card) 28'; Jo. Ortiz (yellow card) 76'; Negredo (yellow card) 87'	Report	53', 56' Bojan	Stadium: Estadio de los Juegos Mediterráneos; Attendance: 9,300; Referee: Manuel Mejuto González

22 March 2009 28	Real Madrid	3 – 0	Almería	Madrid, Spain
16:00	Marcelo 23'; Pepe (yellow card) 29'; Raúl (yellow card) 40'; Ramos (yellow card) 48'; Huntelaar 52', 65'; Heinze (yellow card) 78'; Gago (yellow card) 84'	Report	(yellow card) 62' Bruno; (yellow card) 73' Iriney	Stadium: Santiago Bernabéu Stadium; Attendance: 78,000; Referee: Antonio Mateu

4 April 2009 29	Almería	3 – 0	Villarreal	Almería, Spain
19:00	Negredo 7'; Piatti 20'; Mané 35'; Pellerano (yellow card) 41'; Ju. Ortiz (yellow card) 44'	Report	(yellow card) 21' Fuentes; (yellow card) 25' Venta; (yellow card) (yellow-red card) 58' Pires; (yellow card) 61' Gonzalo Rodríguez	Stadium: Estadio de los Juegos Mediterráneos; Attendance: 16,291; Referee: Alfonso J. Alvarez Izquierdo

12 April 2009 30	Real Mallorca	2 – 0	Almería	Palma de Mallorca, Spain
16:00	Aduriz (yellow card) 45'; Arango (yellow card) 57'; Santana 60'; Jurado (yellow card) 71'; Ramis (yellow card) 72'; Ayoze (yellow card) 75'; Varela (yellow card) 79'; Castro 90'	Report	(yellow card) 3' Bruno; (yellow card) 51' Corona; (red card) 89' Pellerano; (yellow card) 90' Crusat	Stadium: Ono Estadi; Attendance: 14,000; Referee: Carlos Clos

19 April 2009 31	Almería	2 – 1	Osasuna	Almería, Spain
16:00	Mané (yellow card) 31'; García (yellow card) 41'; Iriney (yellow card) 67'; Negredo 71', 89'	Report	(yellow card) 19' Azpilicueta; (yellow card) 63' Roberto; 83' Pandiani; (yellow card) 87' Flaño; (yellow card) 89' Vadócz	Stadium: Estadio de los Juegos Mediterráneos; Attendance: 12,500; Referee: Miguel Pérez Lasa

22 April 2009 32	Deportivo La Coruña	2 – 0	Almería	A Coruña, Spain
19:00	Colotto (yellow card) 44'; Verdú 49'; Bodipo (yellow card) 56'; Lassad 68'	Report	(yellow card) 41' Mané	Stadium: Estadio Riazor; Attendance: 14,000; Referee: Eduardo Iturralde González

25 April 2009 33	Almería	2 – 1	Numancia	Almería, Spain
19:00	Uche 6'; Soriano 41'; Iriney (yellow card) 84'; Esteban (yellow card) 89'	Report	80' Goiria; (yellow card) 83' Cisma; (yellow card) 88' Bravo	Stadium: Estadio de los Juegos Mediterráneos; Attendance: 11,000; Referee: Antonio Mateu

3 May 2009 34	Racing Santander	0 – 2	Almería	Santander, Spain
16:00	Moratón (yellow card) 24'; Lacen (yellow card) 32'; Marcano (yellow card) 81'	Report	3', 13' Ju. Ortiz; (yellow card) 49' Juanito	Stadium: El Sardinero; Attendance: 21,000; Referee: Miguel Ayza Gámez

10 May 2009 35	Almería	3 – 1	Sporting de Gijón	Almería, Spain
16:00	Nieto 27'; Uche 55'; Negredo (yellow card) 64'; García (yellow card) 72'; Soriano (yellow card) 79'; Piatti 90'; Ju. Ortiz (yellow card) 90'	Report	16' (yellow card) 31' Carmelo; (yellow card) 81' Barral	Stadium: Estadio de los Juegos Mediterráneos; Attendance: 11,000; Referee: Alfonso Pérez

17 May 2009 36	Real Betis	2 – 0	Almería	Seville, Spain
16:00	González 6' (yellow card) 82'; Edu (penalty missed) 20'; Melli (yellow card) 23'; Rivera (yellow card) 25'; Arzu 65'; Rivas (yellow card) 75'; Nélson (yellow card) 85'	Report	(red card) 20' Chico; (yellow card) 32' Santos; (yellow card) 63' Nieto	Stadium: Estadio Manuel Ruiz de Lopera; Attendance: 30,000; Referee: Carlos Delgado Ferreiro

23 May 2009 37	Almería	0 – 3	Espanyol	Almería, Spain
20:00	Mané (yellow card) 30'; Iriney (yellow card) 47'; Negredo (yellow card) 63'; Crusat (yellow card) 84'	Report	26', 72' (yellow card) 68' Alonso; 89' Coro	Stadium: Estadio de los Juegos Mediterráneos; Attendance: 7,500; Referee: Fernando Teixeira Vitienes

30 May 2009 38	Atlético Madrid	3 – 0	Almería	Madrid, Spain
20:00	Agüero 19'; R. García 27'; Assunção (yellow card) 36'; Forlán 50'; L. García (yellow card) 70'; Ujfaluši (yellow card) 78'	Report	(yellow card) 64' Negredo	Stadium: Vicente Calderón Stadium; Attendance: 52,000; Referee: Carlos Delgado Ferreiro

=== Copa del Rey ===
==== Round of 32 ====
29 October 2008 1st leg	Rayo Vallecano	1 – 2	Almería	Madrid, Spain
20:00	Yuma (yellow card) 31'; Juanma (yellow card) 48'; Perera 82'	Report	(yellow card) 9' Natalio; 28', 37' (yellow card) 77' Solari; (yellow card) 84' Bruno	Stadium: Estadio Teresa Rivero; Referee: Miguel Ayza Gámez

12 November 2008 2nd leg	Almería	3 – 0	Rayo Vallecano	Almería, Spain
20:00	Jo. Ortiz 60', 63'; Uche (yellow card) 70'; Corona 88'	Report	(yellow card) 65' Reyes; (yellow card) 66' Aganzo; (yellow card) 76' Pachón	Stadium: Estadio de los Juegos Mediterráneos; Referee: Antonio Mateu

Almería won 5–1 on aggregate

==== Round of 16 ====
8 January 2009 1st leg	Real Mallorca	3 – 1	Almería	Palma de Mallorca, Spain
20:00	Keita 8'; Aduriz (yellow card) 18'; Santana 43' (yellow card) 77'; Varela 56'; Jurado (yellow card) 69'	Report	10' (yellow card) 73' Jo. Ortiz; (yellow card) 55' Esteban; (yellow card) 56' Piatti; (yellow card) 66' Solari	Stadium: Ono Estadi; Referee: Antonio Rubinos Pérez

14 January 2009 2nd leg	Almería	1 – 1	Real Mallorca	Almería, Spain
19:00	Piatti 3'; Ju. Ortiz (yellow card) 36'; Santos (red card) 89'	Report	(yellow card) 20' Santana; 28' Arango; (yellow card) 61' Callejón; (yellow card) 68' Suárez	Stadium: Estadio de los Juegos Mediterráneos; Referee: Fernando Teixeira Vitienes

Real Mallorca won 4–2 on aggregate
