= 2010–11 UD Almería season =

UD Almería
2010–11 season
- President: Alfonso García
- Head coach: Juanma Lillo (until 20 November); José Luis Oltra (from 24 November until 5 April); Roberto Olabe (from 6 April)
- Stadium: Juegos Mediterráneos
- La Liga: 20th (relegated)
- Copa del Rey: Semi-finals
- Top goalscorer: League: Pablo Piatti (8); All: Leonardo Ulloa (13)
- Highest home attendance: League: 16,000 vs. Real Zaragoza (5 Dec); Cup: 16,000 vs. Barcelona (2 Feb)
- Lowest home attendance: League: 5,000 vs. Real Mallorca (15 May); Cup: 1,500 vs. Real Mallorca (22 Dec)

In the 2010–11 season, UD Almería played in two competitions: La Liga and the Copa del Rey. It was their fourth season in the top flight since promotion from the 2006–07 Segunda División.

== Squad ==
Retrieved on 29 November 2020

Note: Flags indicate national team as defined under FIFA eligibility rules; some limited exceptions apply. Players may hold more than one non-FIFA nationality.

No.	Pos.	Nation	Player
1	GK	BRA	Diego Alves
2	DF	DEN	Michael Jakobsen (on loan from AaB)
3	DF	URU	Marcelo Silva
4	DF	ARG	Hernán Pellerano
5	FW	NGA	Kalu Uche
6	MF	ESP	Miguel Ángel Luque
7	MF	FRA	Sofiane Feghouli (on loan from Valencia)
7	MF	ESP	Miguel Ángel Nieto
8	MF	ESP	Albert Crusat
10	MF	ESP	José Ortiz (captain)
11	FW	ARG	Pablo Piatti
13	GK	ESP	Diego
13	GK	ESP	Esteban
14	DF	ESP	Antonio Luna (on loan from Sevilla)
15	MF	ESP	Corona
16	DF	BRA	Michel Macedo

No.	Pos.	Nation	Player
17	MF	ESP	Juanma Ortiz
18	DF	PER	Santiago Acasiete
19	MF	CMR	Modeste M'bami
21	DF	ESP	Carlos García
22	MF	COL	Fabián Vargas
23	FW	SWE	Henok Goitom
23	FW	ARG	Leonardo Ulloa
24	MF	ESP	Juanito
25	MF	ARG	Hernán Bernardello
27	GK	AUT	Pirmin Strasser
32	MF	ESP	Cristóbal
40	DF	ESP	Lillo
43	FW	BFA	Jonathan Zongo
—	DF	ESP	Baltasar Rigo
—	MF	ARG	Diego Valeri (on loan from Lanús)

=== Out on loan ===
Note: Flags indicate national team as defined under FIFA eligibility rules; some limited exceptions apply. Players may hold more than one non-FIFA nationality.

No.	Pos.	Nation	Player
—	DF	BRA	Guilherme Santos (on loan at Real Valladolid)

=== Almería B players ===
Retrieved on 29 November 2020

Note: Flags indicate national team as defined under FIFA eligibility rules; some limited exceptions apply. Players may hold more than one non-FIFA nationality.

No.	Pos.	Nation	Player
26	GK	ESP	Álvaro
29	DF	ESP	Ángel Trujillo
30	MF	ESP	Alberto
34	GK	ESP	Lopito
35	MF	ESP	García Márquez
—	DF	ESP	Hugo Álvarez
—	DF	BFA	Patterson Kaboré
—	DF	ESP	Richi
—	DF	ESP	Roberto
—	MF	ESP	Antoñito

No.	Pos.	Nation	Player
—	MF	ESP	Roberto Casabella (on loan from Lorca Atlético)
—	MF	FRA	Bedsenté Gomis
—	MF	WAL	George Higgins
—	MF	ESP	Juanma
—	MF	NGA	John Ogu
—	MF	ESP	Jesús Rubio
—	FW	ESP	Aarón
—	FW	RUS	Nikita Andreyev
—	FW	ESP	César Díaz
—	FW	ESP	José Ramón

== Transfers ==
=== In ===
#	Pos	Player	From	Notes
Summer
2	DF	(Denmark) Michael Jakobsen	(Denmark) AaB	Loan
3	DF	(Uruguay) Marcelo Silva	(Uruguay) Danubio	Undisclosed fee
6	MF	(Spain) Miguel Ángel Luque	(Spain) Barcelona	
21	DF	(Spain) Carlos García	(Spain) Real Betis	Loan return
23	FW	(Argentina) Leonardo Ulloa	(Spain) Castellón	
40	DF	(Spain) Lillo	(Spain) Valencia	
	MF	(Argentina) Diego Valeri	(Argentina) Lanús	Loan
Winter
7	MF	(France) Sofiane Feghouli	(Spain) Valencia	Loan
14	DF	(Spain) Antonio Luna	(Spain) Sevilla	Loan
24	MF	(Spain) Juanito	(Spain) Málaga	Free transfer
27	GK	(Austria) Pirmin Strasser	(Austria) SV Ried	

=== Out ===
#	Pos	Player	To	Notes
Summer
3	DF	(Brazil) Guilherme Santos	(Spain) Real Valladolid	Loan
4	DF	(Spain) Chico	(Italy) Genoa	€4 million
6	DF	(Spain) Domingo Cisma	(Spain) Racing Santander	Free transfer
9	FW	(Argentina) Esteban Solari	(Cyprus) APOEL	
14	MF	(Spain) Álex Quillo	(Spain) Recreativo de Huelva	
21	FW	(Spain) David Rodríguez	(Spain) Celta Vigo	
23	MF	(Spain) Fernando Soriano	(Spain) Osasuna	Free transfer
Winter
7	MF	(Spain) Miguel Ángel Nieto	(Spain) Xerez	Loan
	DF	(Spain) Baltasar Rigo	(Spain) Huesca	
	MF	(Argentina) Diego Valeri	(Argentina) Lanús	Loan return

== Player statistics ==
=== Squad stats ===
Last updated on 30 November 2020.

No.	Pos	Nat	Player	Total		La Liga		Copa del Rey	
No.	Pos	Nat	Player	Apps	Goals	Apps	Goals	Apps	Goals
1	GK	(Brazil) BRA	Diego Alves	33	0	33	0	0	0
2	DF	(Denmark) DEN	Michael Jakobsen	21	0	14+2	0	5	0
3	DF	(Uruguay) URU	Marcelo Silva	25	1	21	1	4	0
4	DF	(Argentina) ARG	Hernán Pellerano	12	0	7+1	0	3+1	0
5	FW	(Nigeria) NGA	Kalu Uche	37	8	26+6	7	2+3	1
6	MF	(Spain) ESP	Miguel Ángel Luque	0	0	0	0	0	0
7	MF	(France) FRA	Sofiane Feghouli	10	2	4+5	2	1	0
8	MF	(Spain) ESP	Albert Crusat	42	4	30+4	3	3+5	1
10	MF	(Spain) ESP	José Ortiz	19	0	0+16	0	0+3	0
11	FW	(Argentina) ARG	Pablo Piatti	41	10	34+1	8	4+2	2
13	GK	(Spain) ESP	Diego	0	0	0	0	0	0
13	GK	(Spain) ESP	Esteban	13	0	5	0	8	0
14	DF	(Spain) ESP	Antonio Luna	15	0	13	0	2	0
15	MF	(Spain) ESP	Corona	37	3	21+9	2	6+1	1
16	DF	(Brazil) BRA	Michel Macedo	37	0	30+1	0	6	0
17	MF	(Spain) ESP	Juanma Ortiz	32	4	24+2	1	5+1	3
18	DF	(Peru) PER	Santiago Acasiete	23	0	17+3	0	2+1	0
19	MF	(Cameroon) CMR	Modeste M'bami	36	1	28+2	1	5+1	0
21	DF	(Spain) ESP	Carlos García	40	1	33	1	7	0
22	MF	(Colombia) COL	Fabián Vargas	27	1	12+8	1	6+1	0
23	FW	(Sweden) SWE	Henok Goitom	31	4	8+18	1	5	3
23	FW	(Argentina) ARG	Leonardo Ulloa	40	13	16+18	7	5+1	6
24	MF	(Spain) ESP	Juanito	10	0	5+4	0	1	0
25	MF	(Argentina) ARG	Hernán Bernardello	38	1	33	1	4+1	0
27	GK	(Austria) AUT	Pirmin Strasser	0	0	0	0	0	0
32	MF	(Spain) ESP	Cristóbal	1	0	0	0	0+1	0
40	DF	(Spain) ESP	Lillo	3	0	1+1	0	1	0
43	FW	(Burkina Faso) BFA	Jonathan Zongo	2	0	0	0	0+2	0
Players who have left the club after the start of the season:
7	MF	(Spain) ESP	Miguel Ángel Nieto	1	0	0+1	0	0	0
	DF	(Spain) ESP	Baltasar Rigo	1	0	1	0	0	0
	MF	(Argentina) ARG	Diego Valeri	12	0	2+7	0	3	0

=== Top scorers ===
Updated on 30 November 2020

Place	Position	Nation	Number	Name	La Liga	Copa del Rey	Total
1	FW	(Argentina)	23	Leonardo Ulloa	7	6	13
2	FW	(Argentina)	11	Pablo Piatti	8	2	10
3	FW	(Nigeria)	5	Kalu Uche	7	1	8
4	MF	(Spain)	8	Albert Crusat	3	1	4
4	MF	(Spain)	17	Juanma Ortiz	1	3	4
4	FW	(Sweden)	23	Henok Goitom	1	3	4
7	MF	(Spain)	15	Corona	2	1	3
8	MF	(France)	7	Sofiane Feghouli	2	0	2
9	DF	(Uruguay)	3	Marcelo Silva	1	0	1
9	MF	(Cameroon)	19	Modeste M'bami	1	0	1
9	DF	(Spain)	21	Carlos García	1	0	1
9	MF	(Colombia)	22	Fabián Vargas	1	0	1
9	MF	(Argentina)	25	Hernán Bernardello	1	0	1
				TOTALS	36	17	53

=== Disciplinary record ===
Updated on 30 November 2020

Number	Nation	Position	Name	La Liga		Copa del Rey		Total	
Number	Nation	Position	Name	Booked	Sent off (straight red)	Booked	Sent off (straight red)	Booked	Sent off (straight red)
25	(Argentina)	MF	Hernán Bernardello	11	0	2	0	13	0
22	(Colombia)	MF	Fabián Vargas	8	0	2	1	10	1
17	(Spain)	MF	Juanma Ortiz	11	0	0	0	11	0
21	(Spain)	DF	Carlos García	7	1	2	0	9	1
23	(Argentina)	FW	Leonardo Ulloa	7	1	1	0	8	1
16	(Brazil)	DF	Michel Macedo	6	0	2	0	8	0
19	(Cameroon)	MF	Modeste M'bami	6	0	2	0	8	0
2	(Denmark)	DF	Michael Jakobsen	4	1	2	0	6	1
8	(Spain)	MF	Albert Crusat	5	0	2	0	7	0
11	(Argentina)	FW	Pablo Piatti	7	0	0	0	7	0
1	(Brazil)	GK	Diego Alves	5	0	0	0	5	0
3	(Uruguay)	DF	Marcelo Silva	3	0	1	0	4	0
4	(Argentina)	DF	Hernán Pellerano	2	1	0	0	2	1
14	(Spain)	DF	Antonio Luna	2	1	0	0	2	1
5	(Nigeria)	FW	Kalu Uche	3	0	0	0	3	0
18	(Peru)	DF	Santiago Acasiete	3	0	0	0	3	0
15	(Spain)	MF	Corona	2	0	0	0	2	0
10	(Spain)	MF	José Ortiz	1	0	0	0	1	0
24	(Spain)	MF	Juanito	1	0	0	0	1	0
40	(Spain)	DF	Lillo	1	0	0	0	1	0
	(Spain)	DF	Baltasar Rigo	1	0	0	0	1	0
	(Argentina)	MF	Diego Valeri	1	0	0	0	1	0
			TOTALS	97	5	16	1	113	6

== Season Results ==
=== Preseason ===
14 August 2010 Trofeo Memorial; Juan Rojas	Almería	2 – 0	Granada CF	Almería, Spain
	Ulloa 51'; Goitom 82'; Jo. Ortiz (yellow card)	Report	(yellow card) Orellana; (yellow card) Rubén Párraga	Stadium: Estadio de los Juegos Mediterráneos; Attendance: 4,700; Referee: José Luis Paradas Romero

=== La Liga ===
Pos	Team	Pld	W	D	L	GF	GA	GD	Pts	Qualification or relegation
16	Getafe	38	12	8	18	49	60	−11	44 (Note: GET 3–0 MLL; MLL 2–0 GET)	
17	Mallorca	38	12	8	18	41	56	−15	44	
18	Deportivo La Coruña (R)	38	10	13	15	31	47	−16	43	Relegation to the Segunda División
19	Hércules (R)	38	9	8	21	36	60	−24	35	Relegation to the Segunda División
20	Almería (R)	38	6	12	20	36	70	−34	30	Relegation to the Segunda División

Source: LFP, sportec.es, Yahoo! Sport
Rules for classification: 1st points; 2nd head-to-head points; 3rd head-to-head goal difference; 4th head-to-head goals scored; 5th goal difference; 6th number of goals scored; 7th Fair-play points
(R) Relegated

==== Results summary ====
Overall								Home						Away					
Pld	W	D	L	GF	GA	GD	Pts	W	D	L	GF	GA	GD	W	D	L	GF	GA	GD
38	6	12	20	36	70	−34	30	3	10	6	23	35	−12	3	2	14	13	35	−22

Last updated: 1 December 2020.

==== Matches ====
29 August 2010 1	Osasuna	0 – 0	Almería	Pamplona, Spain
16:00	Fernández (yellow card) 23'; Camuñas (yellow card) 45'; Lekić (yellow card) 75'; Puñal (yellow card) 87'	Report	(yellow card) 25' Vargas; (red card) 90' García	Stadium: Reyno de Navarra; Attendance: 14,147; Referee: Alfonso J. Alvarez Izquierdo

13 September 2010 2	Almería	2 – 2	Real Sociedad	Almería, Spain
20:00	Piatti 20'; Vargas (yellow card) 32'; Ju. Ortiz (yellow card) 73'; Acasiete (yellow card) 83'; Ulloa 90'; Corona (yellow card) 90'	Report	8' Tamudo; (yellow card) 23' Rivas; (yellow card) 26' Mikel González; 33' Sutil	Stadium: Estadio de los Juegos Mediterráneos; Attendance: 11,000; Referee: Ignacio Iglesias Villenueva

18 September 2010 3	Espanyol	1 – 0	Almería	Barcelona, Spain
17:00	Forlín (yellow card) 21'; Duscher (yellow card) 23'; Callejón 48'; García (yellow card) 66'	Report	(yellow card) 16' Silva; (yellow card) 62' García; (yellow card) 90' Ulloa	Stadium: Cornellà-El Prat; Attendance: 24,345; Referee: José Antonio Teixeira Vitienes

22 September 2010 4	Almería	0 – 1	Levante	Almería, Spain
19:00	Vargas (yellow card) 1'; Valeri (yellow card) 41'; Crusat (yellow card) 48'; Piatti (yellow card) 90'	Report	(yellow card) 32' del Horno; 39' Sergio; (yellow card) 83' Torres	Stadium: Estadio de los Juegos Mediterráneos; Attendance: 9,900; Referee: Javier Turienzo Álvarez

26 September 2010 5	Deportivo La Coruña	0 – 2	Almería	A Coruña, Spain
16:00	Colotto (red card) 42'; Adrián (yellow card) 44'; Castro (yellow card) 88'	Report	4', 19' Uche; (yellow card) 9' M'bami; (yellow card) 63' Corona	Stadium: Estadio Riazor; Attendance: 14,000; Referee: José González González

3 October 2010 6	Almería	1 – 1	Málaga	Almería, Spain
16:00	Ju. Ortiz (yellow card) 40'; Uche (penalty missed) 64' 76'; Macedo (yellow card) 65'; Ulloa (yellow card) 83'	Report	(red card) 40' Eliseu; (yellow card) 43' Apoño; 50' Owusu-Abeyie; (yellow card) 63' Mtiliga; (yellow card) 66' Fernando; (yellow card) 77' Rubén; (yellow card) 80' Silva	Stadium: Estadio de los Juegos Mediterráneos; Attendance: 11,400; Referee: Carlos Clos

17 October 2010 7	Racing Santander	1 – 0	Almería	Santander, Spain
16:00	Munitis (yellow card) 18' (goal) 33'; Henrique (yellow card) 39'; Bakircioglu 88'	Report	(yellow card) 39' Acasiete	Stadium: El Sardinero; Attendance: 14,005; Referee: Antonio Rubinos Pérez

24 October 2010 8	Almería	1 – 1	Hércules	Almería, Spain
16:00	Bernardello (yellow card) 44'; Ulloa 84'; M'bami (yellow card) 87'	Report	(yellow card) 19' Peña; 38' Valdez; (yellow card) 43' Rodri; (yellow card) 60' Aguilar	Stadium: Estadio de los Juegos Mediterráneos; Attendance: 10,167; Referee: José Antonio Teixeira Vitienes

31 October 2010 9	Atlético Madrid	1 – 1	Almería	Madrid, Spain
18:00	Agüero 33'; Domínguez (yellow card) 40'; Tiago (yellow card) 60'; Perea (yellow card) 74'	Report	45' Piatti; (yellow card) 49' Macedo; (yellow card) 72' Alves	Stadium: Vicente Calderón Stadium; Attendance: 35,000; Referee: Fernando Teixeira Vitienes

7 November 2010 10	Almería	1 – 1	Sporting de Gijón	Almería, Spain
16:00	Corona 16'; Uche (yellow card) 31'; Ju. Ortiz (yellow card) 59'; M'bami (yellow card) 77'; Piatti (yellow card) 88'; Ulloa (yellow card) 90'	Report	(yellow card) 56' Carmelo; 73' (yellow card) 87' Novo	Stadium: Estadio de los Juegos Mediterráneos; Attendance: 9,693; Referee: Xavier Estrada Fernández

13 November 2010 11	Athletic Bilbao	1 – 0	Almería	Bilbao, Spain
17:00	San José (penalty missed) 6'; Llorente 10'; Gurpegui (yellow card) 37'; Iraola (yellow card) 45'; Koikili (yellow card) (yellow-red card) 45'; Castillo (red card) 69'	Report	(yellow card) 5' Ju. Ortiz; (yellow card) 64' Vargas; (yellow card) 66' Macedo; (yellow card) 89' Crusat	Stadium: San Mamés; Attendance: 34,000; Referee: Carlos Velasco Carballo

20 November 2010 12	Almería	0 – 8	Barcelona	Almería, Spain
19:00	Vargas (yellow card) 31'; Bernardello (yellow card) 60'	Report	17', 37', 67' Messi; 19' Iniesta; 27' (o.g.) Acasiete; 35' Pedro; (yellow card) 55' Thiago; 62', 73' Bojan	Stadium: Estadio de los Juegos Mediterráneos; Attendance: 13,000; Referee: César Muñiz Fernández

28 November 2010 13	Valencia	2 – 1	Almería	Valencia, Spain
20:00	Soldado 26', 63'; Bruno (yellow card) 35'; Costa (yellow card) 73'	Report	(yellow card) 12' Ju. Ortiz; (yellow card) 82' Piatti; (yellow card) 88' Silva; 90' Ulloa	Stadium: Mestalla Stadium; Attendance: 35,000; Referee: Javier Turienzo Álvarez

5 December 2010 14	Almería	1 – 1	Real Zaragoza	Almería, Spain
16:00	Rigo (yellow card) 13'; Lillo (yellow card) 63'; Piatti 78'	Report	67' (pen.) (yellow card) 76' Gabi; (yellow card) 90' Lanzaro	Stadium: Estadio de los Juegos Mediterráneos; Attendance: 16,000; Referee: Miguel Ayza Gámez

11 December 2010 15	Sevilla	1 – 3	Almería	Seville, Spain
19:00	Zokora (yellow card) 9'; Palop (yellow card) 31'; Kanouté 83'; Alexis (yellow card) (yellow-red card) 90'	Report	(yellow card) 20' (goal) 48' Vargas; (yellow card) 63' Ju. Ortiz; (yellow card) 74' Jakobsen; 81', 90' Piatti	Stadium: Ramón Sánchez Pizjuán; Attendance: 35,000; Referee: José Antonio Teixeira Vitienes

19 December 2010 16	Almería	2 – 3	Getafe	Almería, Spain
16:00	Uche 7'; Ulloa 24' (yellow card) 25'; Ju. Ortiz (yellow card) 35'; Crusat (yellow card) 40'	Report	(yellow card) 20' Marcano; 29' Manu del Moral; 48' Miku; (yellow card) 61' Gavilán; 71' Boateng; (yellow card) 76' Parejo; (yellow card) 82' Sánchez	Stadium: Estadio de los Juegos Mediterráneos; Attendance: 9,000; Referee: Alfonso J. Alvarez Izquierdo

3 January 2011 17	Villarreal	2 – 0	Almería	Villarreal, Spain
19:00	Catalá 22'; Ruben (yellow card) 25'; Valero 58'	Report	(yellow card) 55' Alves; (yellow card) 64' García; (yellow card) 77' Bernardello; (yellow card) 88' Jo. Ortiz	Stadium: Estadio El Madrigal; Attendance: 18,000; Referee: Ignacio Iglesias Villenueva

9 January 2011 18	Real Mallorca	4 – 1	Almería	Palma de Mallorca, Spain
16:00	Ramis 12'; Pereira (yellow card) 24' (goal) 88'; Víctor Casadesús 37' (yellow card) 60'; Nsue 67'	Report	(yellow card) 15' Jakobsen; 66' Crusat	Stadium: Iberostar Estadi; Attendance: 15,800; Referee: Antonio Mateu

16 January 2011 19	Almería	1 – 1	Real Madrid	Almería, Spain
18:00	Uche (yellow card) 56'; Ulloa 60'; M'bami (yellow card) 90'	Report	(yellow card) 16' Albiol; 77' Granero; (yellow card) 90' Özil	Stadium: Estadio de los Juegos Mediterráneos; Attendance: 13,893; Referee: Miguel Pérez Lasa

23 January 2011 20	Almería	3 – 2	Osasuna	Almería, Spain
16:00	García 8' (yellow card) 35'; Ulloa 11', 55'; Piatti (yellow card) 30'; Jakobsen (yellow card) 41'	Report	24' Aranda; (yellow card) 36' Nélson; (yellow card) 39' Soriano; (yellow card) 70' Camuñas; (yellow card) 83' Damià; 90' Lekić	Stadium: Estadio de los Juegos Mediterráneos; Attendance: 8,000; Referee: José Antonio Teixeira Vitienes

29 January 2011 21	Real Sociedad	2 – 0	Almería	San Sebastián, Spain
17:00	Ansotegi 45' (yellow card) 66'; Bravo (yellow card) 64'; Tamudo 78'	Report	(yellow card) 27' Jakobsen; (yellow card) 45' Bernardello; (yellow card) 77' García	Stadium: Anoeta; Attendance: 23,500; Referee: Carlos Clos

5 February 2011 22	Almería	3 – 2	Espanyol	Almería, Spain
17:00	Silva 5'; Uche 7'; Bernardello 18'; Crusat (yellow card) 40'; M'bami (yellow card) 47'; Vargas (yellow card) 64'; Macedo (yellow card) 70'; Alves (yellow card) 90'	Report	(yellow card) 20' Galán; (yellow card) 23' Forlín; 34' (yellow card) 45' Verdú; 49' Álvaro Vázquez	Stadium: Estadio de los Juegos Mediterráneos; Attendance: 9,300; Referee: Alberto Undiano

13 February 2011 23	Levante	1 – 0	Almería	Valencia, Spain
16:00	Juanfran (yellow card) 33'; Caicedo 53'; Iborra (yellow card) 56'; Venta (yellow card) 90'	Report	(yellow card) 61' Macedo; (yellow card) 78' García	Stadium: Ciutat de València; Attendance: 12,000; Referee: Carlos Delgado Ferreiro

20 February 2011 24	Almería	1 – 1	Deportivo La Coruña	Almería, Spain
16:00	Piatti 48'; Ulloa (yellow card) 90'	Report	(yellow card) 18' Lopo; (yellow card) 73' Pérez; (yellow card) 84' Sand; (yellow card) 88' Adrián; 90' Aranzubia	Stadium: Estadio de los Juegos Mediterráneos; Attendance: 12,000; Referee: José González González

28 February 2011 25	Málaga	3 – 1	Almería	Málaga, Spain
20:00	Eliseu (yellow card) 16'; Camacho (yellow card) 45'; Gámez (yellow card) 46'; Maresca 52'; Fernández (yellow card) 71'; Weligton (yellow card) 74'; Rondón 78'; Juanmi 90'	Report	8' Feghouli; (yellow card) 36' Bernardello; (yellow card) (yellow-red card) 76' Ulloa; (yellow card) (yellow-red card) 88' Luna	Stadium: La Rosaleda; Attendance: 26,000; Referee: Alfonso J. Alvarez Izquierdo

3 March 2011 26	Almería	1 – 1	Racing Santander	Almería, Spain
19:00	Macedo (yellow card) 36'; Alves (yellow card) 43'; Crusat 64'	Report	(red card) 17' Henrique; (yellow card) 20' Francis; 37' Colsa; (yellow card) 75' Cisma; (yellow card) 79' Munitis; (yellow card) 86' Toño	Stadium: Estadio de los Juegos Mediterráneos; Attendance: 15,000; Referee: Carlos Velasco Carballo

6 March 2011 27	Hércules	1 – 2	Almería	Alicante, Spain
16:00	Pulhac (yellow card) 32'; Paz 51'; Thomert (yellow card) 61'; Cristian (yellow card) 90'	Report	(yellow card) 61' Bernardello; (yellow card) 67' (goal) 73' M'bami; 70' Feghouli; (yellow card) 89' Juanito; (yellow card) 90' Luna	Stadium: Estadio José Rico Pérez; Attendance: 18,000; Referee: Antonio Rubinos Pérez

12 March 2011 28	Almería	2 – 2	Atlético Madrid	Almería, Spain
17:00	García (yellow card) 18'; Crusat 49'; Bernardello (yellow card) 58'; Goitom 77'	Report	39', 60' Agüero; (yellow card) 40' Elias; (yellow card) 63' Suárez; (yellow card) 73' Filipe Luís	Stadium: Estadio de los Juegos Mediterráneos; Attendance: 13,228; Referee: Ignacio Iglesias Villenueva

20 March 2011 29	Sporting de Gijón	1 – 0	Almería	Gijón, Spain
16:00	de las Cuevas 13'; Botía (yellow card) 32'; Juan Pablo (yellow card) 75'; Castro (yellow card) 78'	Report	(yellow card) 29' Vargas; (yellow card) 55' Silva; (yellow card) 85' Ulloa; (red card) 90' Pellerano	Stadium: El Molinón; Attendance: 25,700; Referee: Javier Turienzo Álvarez

4 April 2011 30	Almería	1 – 3	Athletic Bilbao	Almería, Spain
20:00	Piatti 6'; Luna (yellow card) 26'	Report	29' Muniain; (yellow card) 35' Martínez; 52' Toquero; 61' Orbaiz	Stadium: Estadio de los Juegos Mediterráneos; Attendance: 10,564; Referee: Antonio Mateu

9 April 2011 31	Barcelona	3 – 1	Almería	Barcelona, Spain
19:00	Krkić (yellow card) 17'; Mascherano (yellow card) 19'; Messi 53' (pen.), 90'; Thiago 64'; Villa (yellow card) 78'	Report	(yellow card) 44' Bernardello; 50' Corona; (yellow card) 53' Alves; (yellow card) 63' Ju. Ortiz	Stadium: Camp Nou; Attendance: 80,452; Referee: Miguel Ayza Gámez

16 April 2011 32	Almería	0 – 3	Valencia	Almería, Spain
19:00		Report	51' Soldado; 67' Stankevičius; 81' Alba	Stadium: Estadio de los Juegos Mediterráneos; Attendance: 10,562; Referee: Fernando Teixeira Vitienes

25 April 2011 33	Real Zaragoza	1 – 0	Almería	Zaragoza, Spain
20:00	Alves 70' (o.g.); Lafita (yellow card) 83'; Diogo (yellow card) 90'; Herrera (red card) 90'	Report	(yellow card) 18' García; (yellow card) 26' Ulloa; (yellow card) 63' Ju. Ortiz; (yellow card) 83' Pellerano	Stadium: La Romareda; Attendance: 27,000; Referee: César Muñiz Fernández

1 May 2011 34	Almería	0 – 1	Sevilla	Almería, Spain
16:00	Bernardello (yellow card) 28'; Jakobsen (red card) 52'; Piatti (yellow card) 75'	Report	(yellow card) 12' Romaric; (yellow card) 42' (goal) 58' Renato; (yellow card) 74' Medel	Stadium: Estadio de los Juegos Mediterráneos; Attendance: 8,427; Referee: Antonio Rubinos Pérez

7 May 2011 35	Getafe	2 – 0	Almería	Getafe, Spain
17:00	Colunga 5' (yellow card) 90'; Ríos (yellow card) 38' (goal) 53'; Sánchez (yellow card) 88'; Díaz (yellow card) 89'; Marcano (yellow card) 89'; Ustari (yellow card) 90'	Report	(yellow card) 37' Uche; (yellow card) 45' Crusat; (yellow card) 80' Ju. Ortiz; (yellow card) 83' Bernardello	Stadium: Coliseum Alfonso Pérez; Attendance: 17,000; Referee: César Muñiz Fernández

11 May 2011 36	Almería	0 – 0	Villarreal	Almería, Spain
21:00	Ulloa (yellow card) 14'; Piatti (yellow card) 29'; Pellerano (yellow card) 39'; Bernardello (yellow card) 62'	Report	(yellow card) 76' Mario Gaspar	Stadium: Estadio de los Juegos Mediterráneos; Attendance: 5,500; Referee: Xavier Estrada Fernández

15 May 2011 37	Almería	3 – 1	Real Mallorca	Almería, Spain
20:00	Uche 5'; Ju. Ortiz 15'; Piatti 32' (yellow card) 62'	Report	42' Webó; (yellow card) 90' Nunes	Stadium: Estadio de los Juegos Mediterráneos; Attendance: 5,000; Referee: Miguel Pérez Lasa

21 May 2011 38	Real Madrid	8 – 1	Almería	Madrid, Spain
19:00	Ronaldo 4', 77'; Adebayor 31', 52', 73'; Benzema 48', 63'; Alonso (yellow card) 50'; Joselu 87'	Report	33' Uche; (yellow card) 64' Ju. Ortiz	Stadium: Santiago Bernabéu Stadium; Attendance: 50,000; Referee: Ignacio Iglesias Villenueva

=== Copa del Rey ===
==== Round of 32 ====
28 October 2010 1st leg	Real Sociedad	2 – 3	Almería	San Sebastián, Spain
21:00	Sarpong 7'; Estrada (yellow card) 17'; Elustondo 31' (yellow card) 85'; Ansotegi (penalty missed) 67'	Report	66' Goitom; 71', 88' Ulloa; (yellow card) 77' Macedo	Stadium: Anoeta; Attendance: 15,377; Referee: César Muñiz Fernández

10 November 2010 2nd leg	Almería	2 – 1	Real Sociedad	Almería, Spain
20:00	Goitom 21'; Ulloa 48' (yellow card) 53'; Jakobsen (yellow card) 59'	Report	51' Agirretxe; (yellow card) 65' Llorente	Stadium: Estadio de los Juegos Mediterráneos; Referee: Antonio Mateu

Almería won 5–3 on aggregate

==== Round of 16 ====
22 December 2010 1st leg	Almería	4 – 3	Real Mallorca	Almería, Spain
19:00	Ulloa 6', 28', 72'; García (yellow card) 38'; Uche 65'; Crusat (yellow card) 77'	Report	(yellow card) 5' João Victor; 22' de Guzmán; 44' Víctor Casadesús; (yellow card) 81' Pereira; 88' Webó	Stadium: Estadio de los Juegos Mediterráneos; Attendance: 1,500; Referee: Fernando Teixeira Vitienes

6 January 2011 2nd leg	Real Mallorca	3 – 4	Almería	Palma de Mallorca, Spain
15:00	Ratinho (yellow card) 21'; Crespí (yellow card) 28'; Rubén (yellow card) 50'; Cavenaghi 70', 77'; Pereira 76'	Report	1', 42' Piatti; 3', 34' Ju. Ortiz; (yellow card) 27' M'bami; (yellow card) 59' Jakobsen; (yellow card) (yellow-red card) 83' Vargas	Stadium: Iberostar Estadi; Attendance: 9,569; Referee: Alberto Undiano

Almería won 8–6 on aggregate

==== Quarterfinals ====
13 January 2011 1st leg	Almería	1 – 0	Deportivo La Coruña	Almería, Spain
19:00	M'bami (yellow card) 33'; Ju. Ortiz 35'; Silva (yellow card) 43'; Bernardello (yellow card) 63'; García (yellow card) 90'	Report	(yellow card) 74' Rochela; (yellow card) 87' Juca	Stadium: Estadio de los Juegos Mediterráneos; Attendance: 3,447; Referee: Xavier Estrada Fernández

19 January 2011 2nd leg	Deportivo La Coruña	2 – 3	Almería	A Coruña, Spain
19:00	Aythami Artiles (yellow card) 18'; Álvarez (yellow card) 36' (goal) 44' (pen.); Adrián 51'	Report	19' Corona; 20' (yellow card) 43' Crusat; 55' (pen.) Goitom; (yellow card) 87' Vargas	Stadium: Estadio Riazor; Attendance: 8,000; Referee: Eduardo Iturralde González

Almería won 4–2 on aggregate

==== Semifinals ====
26 January 2011 1st leg	Barcelona	5 – 0	Almería	Barcelona, Spain
21:00	Messi 10', 16'; Villa 11'; Pedro 31'; Keita 88'	Report		Stadium: Camp Nou; Attendance: 49,875; Referee: Antonio Mateu

2 February 2011 2nd leg	Almería	0 – 3	Barcelona	Almería, Spain
19:00	Macedo (yellow card) 28'; Bernardello (yellow card) 61'	Report	(yellow card) 30' Busquets; 35' Adriano; 56' Thiago; 66' Afellay	Stadium: Estadio de los Juegos Mediterráneos; Attendance: 16,000; Referee: Miguel Ayza Gámez

Barcelona won 8–0 on aggregate
