= 2009–10 UD Almería season =

UD Almería
2009–10 season
- President: Alfonso García
- Head coach: Hugo Sánchez (until 20 December); Juanma Lillo (from 24 December)
- Stadium: Juegos Mediterráneos
- La Liga: 13th
- Copa del Rey: Round of 32
- Top goalscorer: League: Kalu Uche (9); All: Kalu Uche (9)
- Highest home attendance: League: 18,194 vs. Sevilla (15 May)
- Lowest home attendance: League: 8,858 vs. Athletic Bilbao (29 Nov); Cup: 3,000 vs. Hércules (12 Nov)

In the 2009–10 season, UD Almería played in two competitions: La Liga and the Copa del Rey. It was their third season in the top flight since promotion from the 2006–07 Segunda División.

== Squad ==
Retrieved on 6 December 2020

Note: Flags indicate national team as defined under FIFA eligibility rules; some limited exceptions apply. Players may hold more than one non-FIFA nationality.

No.	Pos.	Nation	Player
1	GK	BRA	Diego Alves
2	DF	ARG	Hernán Pellerano
3	DF	BRA	Guilherme Santos
4	DF	ESP	Chico
5	FW	NGA	Kalu Uche
6	DF	ESP	Domingo Cisma
7	MF	ESP	Miguel Ángel Nieto
8	MF	ESP	Albert Crusat
9	FW	ARG	Esteban Solari
10	MF	ESP	José Ortiz (captain)
11	FW	ARG	Pablo Piatti
13	GK	ESP	Esteban
14	MF	ESP	Álex Quillo

No.	Pos.	Nation	Player
15	MF	ESP	Corona
16	DF	BRA	Michel Macedo
17	MF	ESP	Juanma Ortiz
18	DF	PER	Santiago Acasiete
19	MF	CMR	Modeste M'bami
20	FW	SWE	Henok Goitom
21	FW	ESP	David Rodríguez
22	MF	COL	Fabián Vargas
23	MF	ESP	Fernando Soriano
24	MF	ARG	Leonardo Borzani
25	MF	ARG	Hernán Bernardello
26	GK	ESP	Álvaro

=== Out on loan ===
Note: Flags indicate national team as defined under FIFA eligibility rules; some limited exceptions apply. Players may hold more than one non-FIFA nationality.

No.	Pos.	Nation	Player
—	DF	ESP	Carlos García (on loan at Real Betis)

=== Almería B players ===
Retrieved on 7 December 2020

Note: Flags indicate national team as defined under FIFA eligibility rules; some limited exceptions apply. Players may hold more than one non-FIFA nationality.

No.	Pos.	Nation	Player
29	DF	ESP	Ángel Trujillo
30	MF	ESP	Alberto
—	DF	ESP	Alfonso de la Cruz
—	DF	ESP	Baltasar Rigo
—	MF	ESP	Fernando Carralero
—	MF	ESP	Chico
—	MF	ESP	Antonio Cobos
—	MF	ESP	José Galán
—	MF	ESP	Gonzalo

No.	Pos.	Nation	Player
—	MF	WAL	George Higgins
—	MF	ESP	David Moreno
—	MF	ESP	Prosi
—	MF	ESP	Jesús Rubio
—	MF	ESP	Sufian
—	FW	ESP	Cristian
—	FW	ESP	Kike
—	FW	ESP	Hugo López
—	FW	ESP	José Ramón

== Transfers ==
=== In ===
#	Pos	Player	From	Notes
Summer
6	DF	(Spain) Domingo Cisma	(Spain) Numancia	Loan return
14	MF	(Spain) Álex Quillo	(Spain) Atlético Madrid B	
19	MF	(Cameroon) Modeste M'bami	(France) Olympique de Marseille	Free transfer
20	FW	(Sweden) Henok Goitom	(Spain) Real Murcia	
21	FW	(Spain) David Rodríguez	(Spain) Celta Vigo	Loan return
22	MF	(Colombia) Fabián Vargas	(Argentina) Boca Juniors	€4 million
25	MF	(Argentina) Hernán Bernardello	(Argentina) Newell's Old Boys	€3 million
Winter
24	MF	(Argentina) Leonardo Borzani	(Argentina) Rosario Central	Free transfer

=== Out ===
#	Pos	Player	To	Notes
Summer
2	DF	(Spain) Bruno	(Spain) Valencia	
6	MF	(Brazil) Iriney	(Spain) Real Betis	Free transfer
9	FW	(Spain) Álvaro Negredo	(Spain) Real Madrid	€5 million
14	MF	(Spain) Julio Álvarez	(Spain) Real Mallorca	Free transfer
21	DF	(Spain) Carlos García	(Spain) Real Betis	Loan
22	DF	(Spain) Mané	(Spain) Getafe	
24	DF	(Spain) Juanito	(Spain) Málaga	

== Player statistics ==
=== Squad stats ===
Last updated on 7 December 2020.

No.	Pos	Nat	Player	Total		La Liga		Copa del Rey	
No.	Pos	Nat	Player	Apps	Goals	Apps	Goals	Apps	Goals
1	GK	(Brazil) BRA	Diego Alves	37	0	37	0	0	0
2	DF	(Argentina) ARG	Hernán Pellerano	21	0	17+2	0	2	0
3	DF	(Brazil) BRA	Guilherme Santos	17	1	11+4	1	2	0
4	DF	(Spain) ESP	Chico	28	1	27	0	1	1
5	FW	(Nigeria) NGA	Kalu Uche	29	9	21+7	9	1	0
6	DF	(Spain) ESP	Domingo Cisma	34	3	29+4	3	0+1	0
7	MF	(Spain) ESP	Miguel Ángel Nieto	16	0	3+11	0	2	0
8	MF	(Spain) ESP	Albert Crusat	34	7	31+2	7	1	0
9	FW	(Argentina) ARG	Esteban Solari	2	0	0+2	0	0	0
10	MF	(Spain) ESP	José Ortiz	21	1	0+19	1	1+1	0
11	FW	(Argentina) ARG	Pablo Piatti	36	7	28+7	7	1	0
13	GK	(Spain) ESP	Esteban	4	0	1+1	0	2	0
14	MF	(Spain) ESP	Álex Quillo	3	0	0+1	0	0+2	0
15	MF	(Spain) ESP	Corona	24	1	13+9	1	2	0
16	DF	(Brazil) BRA	Michel Macedo	29	1	28	1	1	0
17	MF	(Spain) ESP	Juanma Ortiz	34	2	24+9	2	1	0
18	DF	(Peru) PER	Santiago Acasiete	32	0	31	0	1	0
19	MF	(Cameroon) CMR	Modeste M'bami	30	0	28	0	2	0
20	FW	(Sweden) SWE	Henok Goitom	21	1	11+10	1	0	0
21	FW	(Spain) ESP	David Rodríguez	11	1	2+7	1	0+2	0
22	MF	(Colombia) COL	Fabián Vargas	10	0	6+4	0	0	0
23	MF	(Spain) ESP	Fernando Soriano	36	7	33+2	7	1	0
24	MF	(Argentina) ARG	Leonardo Borzani	3	0	2+1	0	0	0
25	MF	(Argentina) ARG	Hernán Bernardello	36	0	35	0	1	0
26	GK	(Spain) ESP	Álvaro	0	0	0	0	0	0

=== Top scorers ===
Updated on 11 December 2020

Place	Position	Nation	Number	Name	La Liga	Copa del Rey	Total
1	FW	(Nigeria)	5	Kalu Uche	9	0	9
2	MF	(Spain)	8	Albert Crusat	7	0	7
2	FW	(Argentina)	11	Pablo Piatti	7	0	7
2	MF	(Spain)	23	Fernando Soriano	7	0	7
5	DF	(Spain)	6	Domingo Cisma	3	0	3
6	MF	(Spain)	17	Juanma Ortiz	2	0	2
7	DF	(Brazil)	3	Guilherme Santos	1	0	1
7	DF	(Spain)	4	Chico	0	1	1
7	MF	(Spain)	10	José Ortiz	1	0	1
7	MF	(Spain)	15	Corona	1	0	1
7	DF	(Brazil)	16	Michel Macedo	1	0	1
7	FW	(Sweden)	20	Henok Goitom	1	0	1
7	FW	(Spain)	21	David Rodríguez	1	0	1
–	Own goals				2	0	2
				TOTALS	43	1	44

=== Disciplinary record ===
Updated on 30 November 2020

Number	Nation	Position	Name	La Liga		Copa del Rey		Total	
Number	Nation	Position	Name	Booked	Sent off (straight red)	Booked	Sent off (straight red)	Booked	Sent off (straight red)
23	(Spain)	MF	Fernando Soriano	13	0	0	0	13	0
8	(Spain)	MF	Albert Crusat	11	0	0	0	11	0
6	(Spain)	DF	Domingo Cisma	10	0	0	0	10	0
17	(Spain)	MF	Juanma Ortiz	7	2	0	0	7	2
25	(Argentina)	MF	Hernán Bernardello	8	0	1	0	9	0
4	(Spain)	DF	Chico	6	2	0	0	6	2
19	(Cameroon)	MF	Modeste M'bami	7	0	1	0	8	0
11	(Argentina)	FW	Pablo Piatti	6	1	0	0	6	1
18	(Peru)	DF	Santiago Acasiete	6	0	0	0	6	0
1	(Brazil)	GK	Diego Alves	3	1	0	0	3	1
2	(Argentina)	DF	Hernán Pellerano	3	0	0	1	3	1
3	(Brazil)	DF	Guilherme Santos	1	1	2	0	3	1
16	(Brazil)	DF	Michel Macedo	3	0	0	0	3	0
5	(Nigeria)	FW	Kalu Uche	2	0	0	0	2	0
15	(Spain)	MF	Corona	2	0	0	0	2	0
7	(Spain)	MF	Miguel Ángel Nieto	1	0	0	0	1	0
10	(Spain)	MF	José Ortiz	1	0	0	0	1	0
13	(Spain)	GK	Esteban	1	0	0	0	1	0
20	(Sweden)	FW	Henok Goitom	1	0	0	0	1	0
24	(Argentina)	MF	Leonardo Borzani	1	0	0	0	1	0
			TOTALS	93	7	4	1	97	8

== Season Results ==
=== La Liga ===
Pos	Team	Pld	W	D	L	GF	GA	GD	Pts
11	Espanyol	38	11	11	16	29	46	−17	44
12	Osasuna	38	11	10	17	37	46	−9	43
13	Almería	38	10	12	16	43	55	−12	42
14	Zaragoza	38	10	11	17	46	64	−18	41
15	Sporting Gijón	38	9	13	16	36	51	−15	40

Source: LFP and Yahoo! Sport
Rules for classification: 1) points; 2) head-to-head points; 3) head-to-head goal difference; 4) head-to-head goals scored; 5) goal difference; 6) number of goals scored.

==== Results summary ====
Overall								Home						Away					
Pld	W	D	L	GF	GA	GD	Pts	W	D	L	GF	GA	GD	W	D	L	GF	GA	GD
38	10	12	16	43	54	−11	42	8	6	5	25	23	+2	2	6	11	18	31	−13

Last updated: 7 December 2020.

==== Matches ====
30 August 2009 1	Almería	0 – 0	Real Valladolid	Almería, Spain
20:00	Macedo (yellow card) 75'; Bernardello (yellow card) 88'	Report	(red card) 13' Nivaldo; (yellow card) 17' Yuri Berchiche; (yellow card) 90' Borja Fernández; (yellow card) 90' Jacobo	Stadium: Estadio de los Juegos Mediterráneos; Attendance: 9,100; Referee: Antonio Mateu

13 September 2009 2	Sporting de Gijón	1 – 0	Almería	Gijón, Spain
16:00	Castro 6'; Maldonado (yellow card) 8'; Botía (yellow card) 78'; Grégory (yellow card) 90'	Report	(yellow card) 34' Soriano; (yellow card) 64' Cisma; (yellow card) 86' Crusat; (yellow card) 90' Nieto	Stadium: El Molinón; Attendance: 25,000; Referee: Miguel Pérez Lasa

20 September 2009 3	Almería	1 – 0	Getafe	Almería, Spain
16:00	Soriano (yellow card) 35'; Macedo 48'; Bernardello (yellow card) 80'; Ju. Ortiz (yellow card) 83'; Alves (yellow card) 89'	Report	(yellow card) 42' Celestini; (yellow card) 54' Rafa; (yellow card) 60' Díaz	Stadium: Estadio de los Juegos Mediterráneos; Attendance: 9,000; Referee: Xavier Estrada Fernández

23 September 2009 4	Atlético Madrid	2 – 2	Almería	Madrid, Spain
19:00	Santana 27' (yellow card) 84'; Forlán 55'; Assunção (yellow card) 75'; López (yellow card) 81'	Report	26', 90' Piatti; (yellow card) 60' Soriano; (yellow card) 68' Acasiete	Stadium: Vicente Calderón Stadium; Attendance: 44,500; Referee: Eduardo Iturralde González

27 September 2009 5	Almería	2 – 2	Racing Santander	Almería, Spain
16:00	Crusat 17' (yellow card) 79'; Chico (yellow card) 22'; Soriano (yellow card) 53'; Uche 89'	Report	(yellow card) 7' Serrano; (yellow card) 36' Crespo; 59' Tchité; 71' Lacen	Stadium: Estadio de los Juegos Mediterráneos; Attendance: 13,200; Referee: Antonio Rubinos Pérez

3 October 2009 6	Barcelona	1 – 0	Almería	Barcelona, Spain
19:00	Xavi (yellow card) 21'; Pedro 31'; Iniesta (yellow card) 78'; Puyol (yellow card) 79'	Report	(yellow card) 39' Uche; (yellow card) 44' Crusat; (yellow card) 45' Bernardello	Stadium: Camp Nou; Attendance: 74,177; Referee: Carlos Velasco Carballo

18 October 2009 7	Málaga	1 – 2	Almería	Málaga, Spain
16:00	Duda (yellow card) 22'; Cuadrado (yellow card) 45'; Gámez (yellow card) 60'; Edinho 68'; M. Torres (yellow card) 74'; Weligton (yellow card) 80'	Report	(yellow card) 5' M'bami; (yellow card) 20' Bernardello; 39' Cisma; 41' Soriano; (yellow card) 90' Acasiete	Stadium: La Rosaleda; Attendance: 21,000; Referee: Manuel Mejuto González

25 October 2009 8	Almería	0 – 3	Valencia	Almería, Spain
18:00	Cisma (yellow card) 33'; Alves (red card) 63'; Chico (yellow card) 67'; Soriano (yellow card) 76'	Report	(yellow card) 18' D. Navarro; (yellow card) 31' Miguel; (yellow card) 39' Banega; 54' Villa; (yellow card) 68' Bruno; (yellow card) 69' Maduro; 74' Hernández; 87' Mata	Stadium: Estadio de los Juegos Mediterráneos; Attendance: 12,171; Referee: José González González

1 November 2009 9	Real Zaragoza	2 – 1	Almería	Zaragoza, Spain
16:00	Aguilar (yellow card) 11'; Lafita 30' (yellow card) 90'; Pulido 35'; Ponzio (yellow card) 41'; Herrera (yellow card) 60'; Paredes (yellow card) 63'	Report	(yellow card) 21' Crusat; (yellow card) 37' Acasiete; 39' (yellow card) 45' Ju. Ortiz; (yellow card) 44' uche (yellow card) 52' Chico	Stadium: La Romareda; Attendance: 24,000; Referee: Alfonso J. Alvarez Izquierdo

8 November 2009 10	Almería	2 – 0	Osasuna	Almería, Spain
16:00	Josetxo 2' (o.g.); Crusat (yellow card) 15'; Chico (yellow card) 73'; Uche 90'	Report	(yellow card) 18' Puñal; (yellow card) 87' Flaño	Stadium: Estadio de los Juegos Mediterráneos; Attendance: 10,260; Referee: Fernando Teixeira Vitienes

22 November 2009 11	Real Mallorca	3 – 1	Almería	Palma de Mallorca, Spain
16:00	Webó (yellow card) 18'; Castro 48', 90'; Álvarez (yellow card) 50'; Ramis (yellow card) 84'; Víctor Casadesús 89'; Nunes (yellow card) 90'	Report	(yellow card) 57' Piatti; (yellow card) 72' Cisma; 77' Rodríguez; (yellow card) 85' Ju. Ortiz	Stadium: Ono Estadi; Attendance: 11,000; Referee: Alfonso Pérez

29 November 2009 12	Almería	1 – 4	Athletic Bilbao	Almería, Spain
16:00	M'bami (yellow card) 38'; Piatti (yellow card) 76'; Uche 84' (pen.); Jo. Ortiz (yellow card) 90'	Report	(yellow card) 6' Iraola; (yellow card) 31' Koikili; 37' Martínez; 41' Ustaritz; (yellow card) 57' Yeste; 59' Llorente; (yellow card) 64' Susaeta; 77' de Marcos	Stadium: Estadio de los Juegos Mediterráneos; Attendance: 8,858; Referee: Bernardino González Vázquez

5 December 2009 13	Real Madrid	4 – 2	Almería	Madrid, Spain
19:00	Ramos 31'; Higuaín 73'; Benzema 82'; Ronaldo 84' (yellow card) (yellow-red card) 88'	Report	(yellow card) 45' M'bami; 58' Soriano; 62' Uche; (yellow card) 79' Macedo; (yellow card) 81' Alves; (yellow card) 82' Acasiete	Stadium: Santiago Bernabéu Stadium; Attendance: 77,000; Referee: Xavier Estrada Fernández

13 December 2009 14	Almería	1 – 1	Deportivo La Coruña	Almería, Spain
16:00	Soriano (yellow card) 20'; Uche 59'	Report	74' Álvarez	Stadium: Estadio de los Juegos Mediterráneos; Attendance: 9,360; Referee: César Muñiz Fernández

20 December 2009 15	Espanyol	2 – 0	Almería	Barcelona, Spain
16:00	Roncaglia (yellow card) 32'; Márquez 45'; García (yellow card) 45'; Coro 80'; Alonso (yellow card) 89'	Report	(yellow card) 44' Piatti; (yellow card) 45' Cisma; (yellow card) 60' Soriano	Stadium: Cornellà-El Prat; Attendance: 22,275; Referee: Carlos Clos

3 January 2010 16	Almería	1 – 0	Xerez	Almería, Spain
16:00	Crusat (yellow card) 22'; Chico (yellow card) 35'; M'bami (yellow card) 45'; Jo. Ortiz 89'	Report	(yellow card) 29' Abel; (yellow card) 59' Casado; (yellow card) 68' Bermejo; (yellow card) 82' Momo; (yellow card) 90' Gioda	Stadium: Estadio de los Juegos Mediterráneos; Attendance: 9,574; Referee: Javier Turienzo Álvarez

9 January 2010 17	Villarreal	1 – 1	Almería	Villarreal, Spain
21:00	Nilmar 40'; Senna (yellow card) 60'; Marcano (yellow card) (yellow-red card) 83'; Fuster (yellow card) 90'	Report	(yellow card) 28' M'bami; 67' (pen.) Corona; (yellow card) 80' Ju. Ortiz	Stadium: Estadio El Madrigal; Attendance: 18,000; Referee: José González González

17 January 2010 18	Almería	1 – 1	Tenerife	Almería, Spain
16:00	Goitom 61'; Piatti (yellow card) (yellow-red card) 67'	Report	2' Juanlu; (yellow card) 17' Kome; (yellow card) 34' Bertrán; (yellow card) 41' Ricardo; (yellow card) 44' Luna; (yellow card) 71' Alonso; (yellow card) 83' Ayoze; (yellow card) 90' Richi	Stadium: Estadio de los Juegos Mediterráneos; Attendance: 17,732; Referee: Carlos Velasco Carballo

23 January 2010 19	Sevilla	1 – 0	Almería	Seville, Spain
17:00	Negredo 9'; Dragutinović (yellow card) 15'; Escudé (yellow card) 77'	Report	(yellow card) 29' Ju. Ortiz; (yellow card) 62' Corona; (yellow card) 90' Soriano	Stadium: Ramón Sánchez Pizjuán; Attendance: 32,000; Referee: Antonio Mateu

31 January 2010 20	Real Valladolid	1 – 1	Almería	Valladolid, Spain
16:00	Manucho (yellow card) (yellow-red card) 38'; Prieto (yellow card) 45'; Canobbio (yellow card) 67'; Arzo 81'; Costa (yellow card) 90'	Report	12' Crusat; (yellow card) 23' Soriano; (yellow card) 32' Pellerano	Stadium: José Zorrilla; Attendance: 14,700; Referee: César Muñiz Fernández

7 February 2010 21	Almería	3 – 1	Sporting de Gijón	Almería, Spain
16:00	Chico (red card) 12'; Crusat 15'; Cisma 43'; Santos 81'	Report	13' (pen.) (yellow card) 45' Castro; (yellow card) 20' Portilla; (yellow card) 30' Sastre; (yellow card) 40' Juan Pablo; (yellow card) 55' Rivera; (yellow card) (yellow-red card) 78' Barral; (red card) 80' Grégory; (yellow card) 86' Pedro	Stadium: Estadio de los Juegos Mediterráneos; Attendance: 11,000; Referee: Miguel Ayza Gámez

14 February 2010 22	Getafe	2 – 2	Almería	Getafe, Spain
16:00	Rafa (yellow card) 31'; Soldado (yellow card) 34' (goal) 70'; Casquero 55'	Report	(yellow card) 24' (goal) 47' Piatti; (yellow card) 66' Cisma; 90' Soriano	Stadium: Coliseum Alfonso Pérez; Attendance: 11,000; Referee: Miguel Pérez Lasa

21 February 2010 23	Almería	1 – 0	Atlético Madrid	Almería, Spain
18:00	Borzani (yellow card) 28'; Cisma (yellow card) 68'; Piatti 87'	Report	(yellow card) 5' Domínguez; (yellow card) 30' Reyes; (yellow card) 83' Tiago	Stadium: Estadio de los Juegos Mediterráneos; Attendance: 14,000; Referee: Carlos Delgado Ferreiro

28 February 2010 24	Racing Santander	0 – 2	Almería	Santander, Spain
16:00	Xisco (yellow card) 55'; Colsa (yellow card) 56'; Henrique (yellow card) 63'; Arana (yellow card) 65'; Munitis (yellow card) 71'	Report	29' Soriano; (yellow card) 50' Macedo; 67' Crusat	Stadium: El Sardinero; Attendance: 15,486; Referee: Carlos Velasco Carballo

6 March 2010 25	Almería	2 – 2	Barcelona	Almería, Spain
19:00	Cisma 12'; Puyol 57' (o.g.)	Report	42', 66' Messi; (red card) 60' Ibrahimović	Stadium: Estadio de los Juegos Mediterráneos; Attendance: 14,758; Referee: Carlos Clos

14 March 2010 26	Almería	1 – 0	Málaga	Almería, Spain
16:00	Cisma (yellow card) 45'; Acasiete (yellow card) 53'; Soriano 56'	Report	(yellow card) 55' Valdo; (yellow card) 59' González; (yellow card) 73' Caicedo	Stadium: Estadio de los Juegos Mediterráneos; Attendance: 10,000; Referee: Alberto Undiano

21 March 2010 27	Valencia	2 – 0	Almería	Valencia, Spain
18:00	Lillo (yellow card) 25'; Fernandes (yellow card) 40'; Mata 63'; Silva 70'	Report	(yellow card) 20' Bernardello; (yellow card) 33' Cisma	Stadium: Mestalla Stadium; Attendance: 33,000; Referee: Fernando Teixeira Vitienes

24 March 2010 28	Almería	1 – 0	Real Zaragoza	Almería, Spain
19:00	Piatti (yellow card) 17'; Soriano (yellow card) 36'; Uche 61'; Pellerano (yellow card) 81'	Report	(yellow card) 37' Aguilar; (yellow card) 42' Herrera; (yellow card) 44' Ponzio; (yellow card) 78' Edmílson	Stadium: Estadio de los Juegos Mediterráneos; Attendance: 15,772; Referee: Eduardo Iturralde González

28 March 2010 29	Osasuna	1 – 0	Almería	Pamplona, Spain
16:00	Pandiani 20'; Aranda (yellow card) 61'; Juanfran (yellow card) 69'; Puñal (yellow card) 85'	Report	(yellow card) (yellow-red card) 60' Ju. Ortiz; (yellow card) 80' Crusat; (yellow card) 85' Santos	Stadium: Reyno de Navarra; Attendance: 16,421; Referee: Antonio Rubinos Pérez

4 April 2010 30	Almería	1 – 1	Real Mallorca	Almería, Spain
16:00	Uche 4'; Bernardello (yellow card) 53'	Report	(yellow card) 63' Castro; (yellow card) 78' Martí; 88' Webó	Stadium: Estadio de los Juegos Mediterráneos; Attendance: 9,574; Referee: Alfonso J. Alvarez Izquierdo

11 April 2010 31	Athletic Bilbao	4 – 1	Almería	Bilbao, Spain
16:00	Martínez 13', 49'; Gabilondo 32'; Llorente 51'; Amorebieta (yellow card) 77'	Report	71' Piatti	Stadium: San Mamés; Attendance: 36,600; Referee: Carlos Clos

15 April 2010 32	Almería	1 – 2	Real Madrid	Almería, Spain
19:00	Crusat 14'; Bernardello (yellow card) 37'; Cisma (yellow card) 42'; Pellerano (yellow card) 88'	Report	(yellow card) 15' Gago; 27' Ronaldo; (yellow card) 63' Diarra; 69' van der Vaart; (yellow card) 77' Guti; (yellow card) 79' Albiol	Stadium: Estadio de los Juegos Mediterráneos; Attendance: 11,500; Referee: Miguel Pérez Lasa

18 April 2010 33	Deportivo La Coruña	0 – 0	Almería	A Coruña, Spain
16:00	Tomás (yellow card) 41'; Colotto (yellow card) 47'	Report	(yellow card) 74' Crusat; (yellow card) 82' M'bami	Stadium: Estadio Riazor; Attendance: 12,000; Referee: Eduardo Iturralde González

25 April 2010 34	Almería	0 – 1	Espanyol	Almería, Spain
16:00	Chico (yellow card) 19'; Cisma (yellow card) 86'; Soriano (yellow card) 90'	Report	(yellow card) 20' Vilà; (yellow card) 33' Forlín; 55' García; (yellow card) 64' Roncaglia; (yellow card) 86' Ruiz; (yellow card) (yellow-red card) 90' Pareja	Stadium: Estadio de los Juegos Mediterráneos; Attendance: 11,000; Referee: Carlos Velasco Carballo

1 May 2010 35	Xerez	2 – 1	Almería	Jerez de la Frontera, Spain
17:00	Armenteros 28'; Sánchez (yellow card) 32'; Calvo (yellow card) 36'br>Keita (yellow card) (yellow-red card) 39'; Bermejo 90'	Report	34' Soriano; (yellow card) 53' Acasiete; (yellow card) 55' Bernardello; (yellow card) 65' (red card) 90' Ju. Ortiz; (yellow card) (yellow-red card) 84' Santos; (yellow card) 88' Goitom	Stadium: Chapín; Attendance: 15,000; Referee: Miguel Ayza Gámez

4 May 2010 36	Almería	4 – 2	Villarreal	Almería, Spain
19:00	Crusat 13' (yellow card) 58'; Uche 28', 41'; M'bami (yellow card) 64'; Chico (red card) 65'; Alves (yellow card) 72'; Soriano (yellow card) 85'; Piatti 90' (yellow card) 90'	Report	(red card) 15' Musacchio; 54' Marcano; (yellow card) 59' Cazorla; 66' Ibagaza	Stadium: Estadio de los Juegos Mediterráneos; Attendance: 18,000; Referee: Javier Turienzo Álvarez

8 May 2010 37	Tenerife	2 – 2	Almería	Santa Cruz de Tenerife, Spain
20:00	Bertrán 15' (yellow card) 40'; Ayoze (yellow card) 20'; Nino 90'	Report	18' Piatti; (yellow card) 25' (goal) 81' Crusat; (yellow card) 50' Corona	Stadium: Heliodoro Rodríguez López; Attendance: 20,810; Referee: Miguel Pérez Lasa

15 May 2010 38	Almería	2 – 3	Sevilla	Almería, Spain
21:00	Soriano (yellow card) 4' (goal) 43'; Crusat (yellow card) 13'; Ju. Ortiz (yellow card) 50' (goal) 79'	Report	(yellow card) 10' Zokora; 16' Kanouté; (yellow card) 25' Stankevičius; (yellow card) 52' Squillaci; 53' (o.g.) Chico; (red card) 65' Negredo; 90' (yellow card) 90' Rodri	Stadium: Estadio de los Juegos Mediterráneos; Attendance: 18,194; Referee: Antonio Rubinos Pérez

=== Copa del Rey ===
==== Round of 32 ====
28 October 2009 1st leg	Hércules	2 – 1	Almería	Alicante, Spain
19:00	Dănciulescu 54' (yellow card); Sergio Díaz 88' (yellow card); Ruz (yellow card)	Report	39' Chico; (yellow card) Bernardello; (yellow card) M'bami; (yellow card) Santos	Stadium: Estadio José Rico Pérez; Attendance: 8,000; Referee: Xavier Estrada Fernández

12 November 2009 2nd leg	Almería	0 – 1	Hércules	Almería, Spain
20:00	Pellerano (yellow card) (yellow-red card) 90'; Santos (yellow card)	Report	76' Gomes; (yellow card) Alonso; (yellow card) Pamarot; (yellow card) Ruz; (yellow card) Sergio Díaz	Stadium: Estadio de los Juegos Mediterráneos; Attendance: 3,000; Referee: Antonio Rubinos Pérez

Hércules won 3–1 on aggregate
