= Pablo Piatti =

Argentine footballer (born 1989)

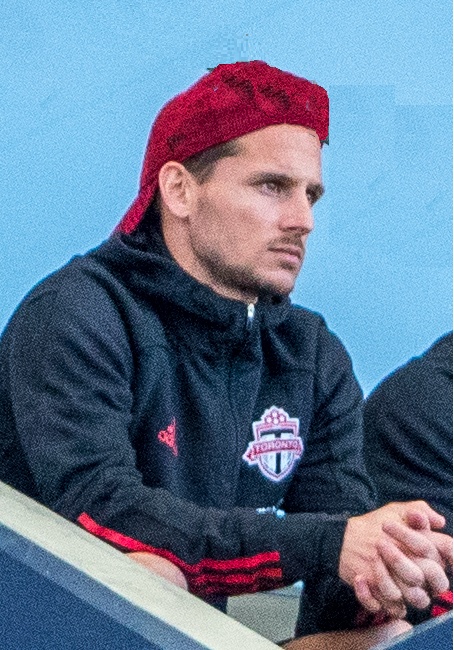
- Piatti with Toronto FC in 2020

Personal information
- Full name: Pablo Daniel Piatti
- Date of birth: 31 March 1989 (age 37)
- Place of birth: Ucacha, Argentina
- Height: 1.64 m (5 ft 5 in)
- Position: Winger

Youth career
- 2002–2003: Jorge Newbery
- 2003–2006: Estudiantes

Senior career*
Years	Team	Apps	(Gls)
2006–2008	Estudiantes	49	(13)
2008–2011	Almería	101	(20)
2011–2017	Valencia	110	(15)
2016–2017	→ Espanyol (loan)	30	(10)
2017–2020	Espanyol	53	(3)
2020	Toronto FC	17	(4)
2021–2022	Elche	19	(0)
2022–2024	Estudiantes	52	(4)
Total		431	(69)

International career
2007	Argentina U20	6	(0)
2011	Argentina	1	(0)
Medal record
Men's football
Representing Argentina
FIFA U-20 World Cup
Winner	2007 Canada	U-20 Team
- * Club domestic league appearances and goals

Pablo Daniel Piatti (born 31 March 1989) is an Argentine former professional footballer. He operated mainly as a left winger, but could also play as a forward.

He spent the vast majority of his career in Spain after starting out at Estudiantes, appearing in 313 La Liga matches over 14 seasons and scoring a total of 48 goals for Almería, Valencia, Espanyol and Elche. He also represented Toronto FC in Major League Soccer, having signed in 2020.

Piatti was capped once for the Argentina national team, in 2011.

== Club career ==
=== Estudiantes ===
Born in Ucacha, Córdoba of Italian descent, Piatti was a product of Estudiantes de La Plata's youth ranks. He made the headlines when coach Diego Simeone gave him his first opportunity against Newell's Old Boys on 18 November 2006, as the player was just 17. He scored the winning goal (2–1) deep into injury time, and became one of the heroes of Estudiantes' championship-winning team.

Piatti made the side's starting eleven in the 2007 Clausura tournament, alongside José Luis Calderón, José Sosa, and Juan Sebastián Verón.

=== Almería ===
After making 60 appearances in all competitions for Estudiantes in two years, Piatti was sold to Almería in Spain for an undisclosed fee believed to be in the region of €7 million. Initially an undisputed starter, notably netting in a 1–1 home draw against Real Madrid, he struggled after the arrival, midway through his first season, of Mexican coach Hugo Sánchez.

In the 2009–10 campaign, without the presence of striker Álvaro Negredo, Piatti was much more depended upon in scoring matters and netted seven times in 35 matches, joint-second in the team as they finished in 13th position. On 23 September 2009, he opened and closed the 2–2 draw at Atlético Madrid and, in the second La Liga match between the two teams, netted a last-minute winner (1–0).

=== Valencia ===
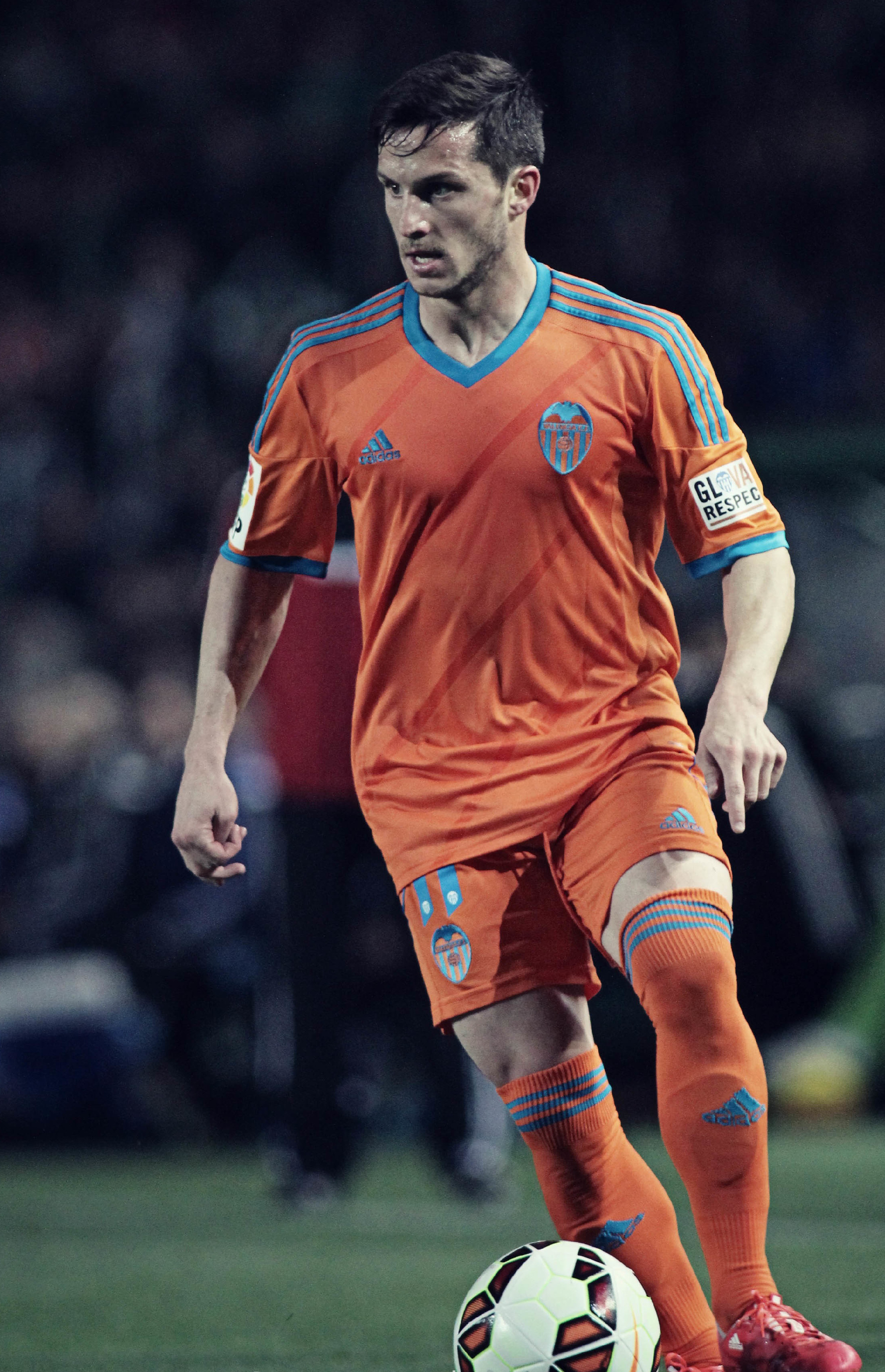
Piatti in action for Valencia in 2015

On 5 July 2011, Almería and Valencia reached an agreement for the transfer of Piatti, with the player signing a five-year contract for a fee of €7.5 million. He struggled to reproduce his previous form during most of his first season with the Che, but did feature in 47 official matches.

Piatti scored his first official goal for Valencia on 19 January 2012, netting the 3–1 in the 45th minute of an eventual 4–1 home victory over Levante in the quarter-finals of the Copa del Rey. He added another two in the second leg (3–0).

After Jordi Alba and Jérémy Mathieu developed an efficient left-wing partnership, Piatti was used inconsistently by managers Mauricio Pellegrino, Ernesto Valverde and Miroslav Đukić, also struggling with some injury problems. He was transfer listed against his will by the latter in the summer of 2013.

After the dismissal of Đukić due to poor results, however, new boss Juan Antonio Pizzi showed faith in his compatriot Piatti, who repaid the former's confidence by finishing 2013–14 with five league goals from 17 appearances, one of those coming in a 3–2 away defeat of Barcelona.

Following the purchase of the club by businessman Peter Lim, Piatti continued being a key player under Nuno Espírito Santo, being dubbed Pablito by the manager.

=== Espanyol ===
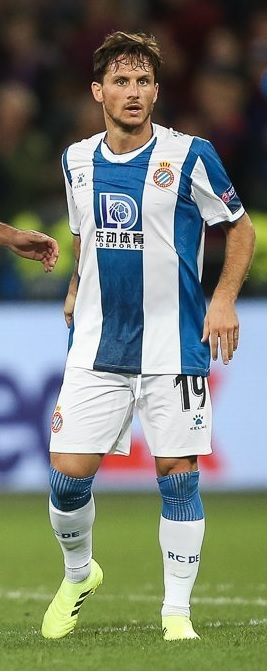
Piatti playing with Espanyol in 2019

Piatti was loaned to Espanyol for one year on 16 July 2016, with a buyout clause. The following 24 May, after scoring a career-best ten goals to help his team to the eighth position, he signed a permanent three-year deal with the club.

In February 2019, during a home match against Rayo Vallecano, Piatti suffered an injury to both his right knee's anterior cruciate and internal lateral ligaments, going on to be sidelined for several months.

=== Toronto FC ===
In February 2020, Piatti moved to Toronto FC in Major League Soccer as a Designated Player, signing a one-year deal. Later that month, however, he was ruled out of the opening of the campaign after picking up a hamstring strain in training. He made his debut on 13 July, in a 2–2 draw against D.C. United in the group stages of the MLS is Back Tournament. He scored his first two goals on 18 August, in a 3–0 home win over the Vancouver Whitecaps in his side's first match since the return of the regular season.

The team declined their option to extend Piatti's contract on 30 November 2020.

=== Elche ===
Piatti returned to the Spanish top division on 6 March 2021, joining Elche. He scored his only goal on 6 January 2022, in the 2–1 away victory against Almería in the Spanish Cup.

=== Return to Estudiantes ===
On 14 June 2022, the 33-year old Piatti returned to his former club Estudiantes, on a deal until June 2024. On 21 December 2024, after claiming the Trofeo de Campeones de la Liga Profesional against Vélez Sarsfield, he retired alongside his teammate Federico Fernández.

== International career ==
Shortly after making his senior debut for Estudiantes, Piatti was part of the Argentina squad that won the 2007 FIFA U-20 World Cup in Canada. The youngest player in the roster, he managed to play six of seven games.

On 5 June 2011, Piatti made his debut for the senior side, as national team boss Sergio Batista handed him a start in a 2–1 friendly loss to Poland.

== Style of play ==
Skillful and with an eye for goal, Piatti was capable of contributing to his team's attacking play by both scoring and assisting; moreover, he could shoot with either foot despite being naturally left-footed. Normally a winger, he was also able to play as a forward but was even deployed in a deeper and more creative role behind the main striker. He usually appeared on the left side of the pitch, although he could do so on the right flank.

A dynamic, explosive and fleet-footed attacker, Piatti was known for his turn of pace, which along with his dribbling technique enabled him to get past opponents and make runs into the penalty area. Regarded as a promising player in his youth, his style was initially likened to that of compatriot Lionel Messi.

== Career statistics ==
=== Club ===
Appearances and goals by club, season and competition
Club	Season	League			National cup		Continental		Other		Total	
Club	Season	Division	Apps	Goals	Apps	Goals	Apps	Goals	Apps	Goals	Apps	Goals
Estudiantes	2006–07	Argentine Primera División	17	5	0	0	0	0	—		17	5
Estudiantes	2007–08	Argentine Primera División	32	8	0	0	10 (Note: Appearances in Copa Sudamericana)	0	—		42	8
Estudiantes	Total		49	13	0	0	10	0	—		59	13
Almería	2008–09	La Liga	31	5	2	1	—		—		33	6
Almería	2009–10	La Liga	35	7	1	0	—		—		36	7
Almería	2010–11	La Liga	35	8	6	2	—		—		41	10
Almería	Total		101	20	9	3	—		—		110	23
Valencia	2011–12	La Liga	30	2	7	3	10	1	—		47	6
Valencia	2012–13	La Liga	14	1	3	0	2	0	—		19	1
Valencia	2013–14	La Liga	17	5	3	0	9	2	—		29	7
Valencia	2014–15	La Liga	28	7	2	0	—		—		30	7
Valencia	2015–16	La Liga	21	0	6	1	10	1	—		37	2
Valencia	Total		110	15	21	4	31	4	—		162	23
Espanyol (loan)	2016–17	La Liga	30	10	1	0	—		—		31	10
Espanyol	2017–18	La Liga	30	2	1	0	—		—		31	2
Espanyol	2018–19	La Liga	20	1	6	1	—		—		26	2
Espanyol	2019–20	La Liga	3	0	2	0	2	0	—		7	0
Espanyol	Total		83	13	10	1	2	0	—		95	14
Toronto FC	2020	Major League Soccer	17 (Note: Includes three appearances in MLS is Back Tournament group stage)	4	0	0	—		2 (Note: One appearance in MLS is Back Tournament knockout stage, one appearance in MLS Cup playoffs)	0	19	4
Elche	2020–21	La Liga	9	0	0	0	—		—		9	0
Elche	2021–22	La Liga	10	0	3	1	—		—		13	1
Elche	Total		19	0	3	1	—		—		22	1
Estudiantes	2022	Argentine Primera División	16	2	1	0	3 (Note: Appearances in Copa Libertadores)	0	—		20	2
Estudiantes	2023	Argentine Primera División	9	0	1	0	1	1	—		11	1
Estudiantes	2024	Argentine Primera División	27	2	2	1	5	0	1 (Note: Appearance in Trofeo de Campeones)	0	35	3
Estudiantes	Total		52	4	4	1	9	1	1	0	66	6
Career total			431	69	47	10	52	5	3	0	533	84

=== International ===
Appearances and goals by national team and year
National team	Year	Apps	Goals
Argentina	2011	1	0
Total		1	0

== Honours ==
Estudiantes

- Argentine Primera División: 2006 Apertura
- Copa Argentina: 2023
- Copa de la Liga Profesional: 2024
- Trofeo de Campeones de la Liga Profesional: 2024

Argentina U20

- FIFA U-20 World Cup: 2007

Individual

- UEFA La Liga Team of the Season: 2016–17
