= Pepe Vergara =

Spanish footballer (born 1984)

José Luis Vergara Serón (born 9 June 1984) is a Spanish footballer who plays as a midfielder for CA Marbella.

== Life ==
Vergara is a native of Málaga, Spain. He grew up playing handball and football before focusing on football.

== Career ==
Vergara made over 200 appearances in the Spanish professional leagues. He was regarded as a player who played for clubs that aimed to avoid relegation. In 2014, he signed for Spanish side Vélez, where he was regarded as one of the best players in the league and a commanding presence. In 2016, he signed for Spanish side El Palo, where he scored a goal that was regarded as one of the best goals in the league that season. In 2022, he signed for Spanish side CA Marbella, where he was regarded as one of the club's most important players.

Vergara played for the Andalusia national football team.

== Style of play ==
Vergara mainly operates as a midfielder and is known as a "number 10" and playmaker.
