= Rafa Barber =

Spanish footballer

Rafael Barber
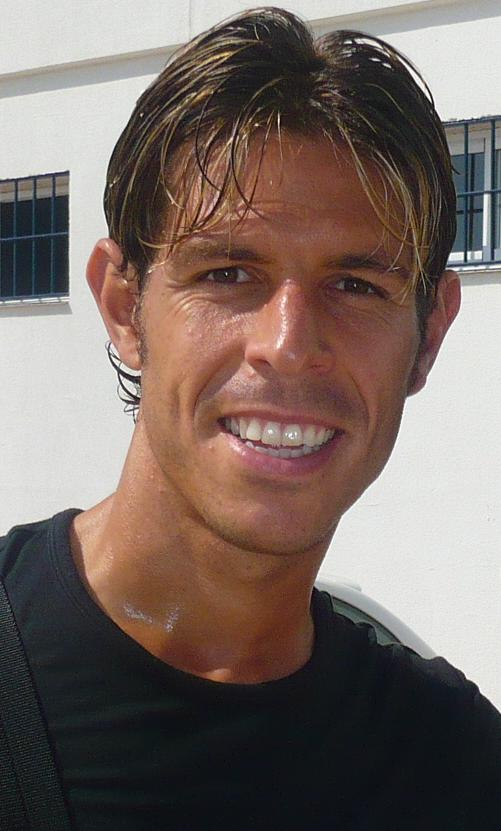
- Barber in 2009

Personal information
- Full name: Rafael Barber Rodríguez
- Date of birth: 2 October 1980 (age 46)
- Place of birth: Aielo de Malferit, Spain
- Height: 1.82 m (6 ft 0 in)
- Position: Midfielder

Youth career
- Valencia

Senior career*
Years	Team	Apps	(Gls)
1999–2001	Valencia B	21	(2)
2001–2002	Ontinyent		
2002–2005	Conquense	100	(15)
2005–2010	Recreativo	116	(3)
2010–2013	Xerez	47	(0)
2013–2014	Huesca	22	(1)
Total		306	(21)

International career
1996	Spain U16	2	(0)
1998–1999	Spain U18	5	(0)
- * Club domestic league appearances and goals

Rafael "Rafa" Barber Rodríguez (born 2 October 1980) is a Spanish former professional footballer who played as a midfielder.

== Club career ==
Barber was born in Aielo de Malferit, Valencian Community. After making his professional debut with modest clubs (Ontinyent CF and UB Conquense) he joined Andalusia's Recreativo de Huelva for the 2005–06 season, being instrumental in the team's La Liga promotion. He would be put to use in various midfielder positions in the subsequent years, making his debut in the competition on 28 October 2006 in a 3–0 away loss against FC Barcelona.

Barber suffered with some physical problems in 2009–10 campaign, appearing in only 20 out of 42 Segunda División games as Recre failed to return to the top flight. In July 2010, at nearly 30, he signed with another side in that tier and region, Xerez CD.

== Honours ==
Recreativo

- Segunda División: 2005–06
