= Natalio Lorenzo =

Spanish footballer

Natalio
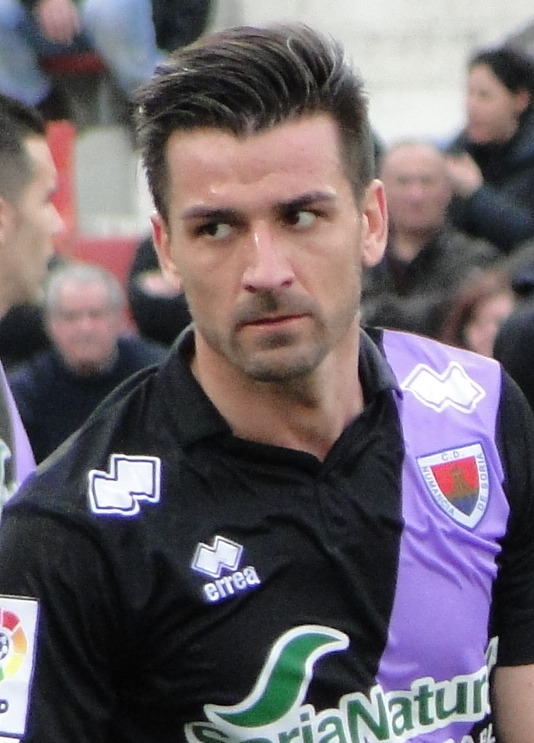
- Natalio with Numancia in 2015

Personal information
- Full name: Natalio Lorenzo Poquet
- Date of birth: 18 September 1984 (age 42)
- Place of birth: Canals, Spain
- Height: 1.76 m (5 ft 9 in)
- Position: Forward

Team information
- Current team: Avilés
- Number: 19

Youth career
- Cracks
- Valencia

Senior career*
Years	Team	Apps	(Gls)
2002–2003	Valencia C		
2003–2004	Pego		
2004–2005	Villajoyosa	22	(3)
2005–2007	Castellón	38	(14)
2005–2006	→ Cartagena (loan)	33	(4)
2007–2010	Almería	22	(0)
2008	→ Cádiz (loan)	21	(5)
2009	→ Córdoba (loan)	20	(2)
2009–2010	→ Murcia (loan)	38	(9)
2010–2011	Tenerife	33	(4)
2011–2016	Numancia	163	(27)
2016	Llagostera	19	(7)
2016–2017	UCAM Murcia	26	(2)
2017	Yunnan Lijiang	13	(4)
2018	Recreativo	5	(0)
2018–2019	Badalona	27	(6)
2019	Olot	15	(1)
2020–	Avilés	169	(62)
- * Club domestic league appearances and goals as of 9 June 2026

Natalio Lorenzo Poquet (Spanish pronunciation: [naˈtaljo loˈɾenθo poˈket]; born 18 September 1984), known simply as Natalio, is a Spanish professional footballer who plays as a forward for Primera Federación club Real Avilés.

He played 358 games in the Segunda División over 11 seasons, totalling 70 goals for eight clubs (mainly Numancia). In La Liga, he represented Almería.

== Club career ==
Born in Canals, Valencia, Natalio played his first years as a professional with lowly clubs, being bought by Segunda División B's CD Castellón in 2005 and spending his first season on loan to FC Cartagena, also at that level.

Returning for the 2006–07 campaign, with Castellón now in the Segunda División, Natalio scored a team-best 15 goals as the team managed to retain their league status. In that summer, he signed with UD Almería as both player and club had their first La Liga experience, and made his competition debut on 15 September 2007, playing 20 minutes in a 3–1 away loss against Real Madrid. He ultimately failed to settle at the Andalusians, being consecutively loaned for the duration of his contract; he also did not manage to score in the league during his tenure.

On 21 November 2009, Natalio scored three times for Real Murcia CF in a 3–0 home win over Real Unión. A starter throughout the division two season, he saw his team get relegated in the last matchday after a 1–1 draw at Girona FC (which in turn managed to stay afloat).

Natalio was definitely released by Almería in June 2010, agreeing to a three-year contract at second-tier CD Tenerife on 16 July. In the following summer, after the Canary Islands side suffered a second consecutive relegation, he stayed in the league and signed for CD Numancia.

After several seasons of regular playing time, Natalio joined UE Llagostera still in the second division on 27 January 2016. Following their relegation, he moved to newly promoted UCAM Murcia CF on 30 June.

On 14 July 2017, aged 32, Natalio moved abroad for the first time in his career and signed for China League One club Yunnan Lijiang FC.

== Career statistics ==
As of 19 May 2024

Appearances and goals by club, season and competition
Club	Season	League			Cup		Continental		Other		Total	
Club	Season	Division	Apps	Goals	Apps	Goals	Apps	Goals	Apps	Goals	Apps	Goals
Pego	2003–04	Tercera División					—		—		8	4
Villajoyosa	2004–05	Segunda División B	22	3	0	0	—		—		22	3
Castellón	2006–07	Segunda División	38	14	0	0	—		—		38	14
Cartagena (loan)	2005–06	Segunda División B	33	4	0	0	—		—		33	4
Almería	2007–08	La Liga	13	0	2	1	—		—		15	1
Almería	2008–09	La Liga	9	0	3	0	—		—		12	0
Almería	Total		22	0	5	1	—		—		27	1
Cádiz (loan)	2007–08	Segunda División	21	5	—		—		—		21	5
Córdoba (loan)	2008–09	Segunda División	20	2	—		—		—		20	2
Murcia (loan)	2009–10	Segunda División	38	8	2	0	—		—		40	8
Tenerife	2010–11	Segunda División	33	4	0	0	—		—		33	4
Numancia	2011–12	Segunda División	34	5	1	0	—		—		35	5
Numancia	2012–13	Segunda División	39	13	1	0	—		—		40	13
Numancia	2013–14	Segunda División	40	5	1	0	—		—		41	5
Numancia	2014–15	Segunda División	37	2	0	0	—		—		37	2
Numancia	2015–16	Segunda División	13	2	0	0	—		—		13	2
Numancia	Total		163	27	3	0	—		—		166	27
Llagostera	2015–16	Segunda División	19	7	—		—		—		19	7
UCAM Murcia	2016–17	Segunda División	26	2	2	0	—		—		28	2
Yunnan Lijiang	2017	China League One	13	4	0	0	—		—		13	4
Recreativo	2017–18	Segunda División B	5	0	—		—		—		5	0
Badalona	2018–19	Segunda División B	27	6	1	0	—		—		28	6
Olot	2019–20	Segunda División B	15	1	0	0	—		—		15	1
Avilés	2019–20	Tercera División	8	4	—		—		—		8	4
Avilés	2020–21	Tercera División	26	18	0	0	—		2	2	28	20
Avilés	2021–22	Segunda División RFEF	33	9	—		—		1	0	34	9
Avilés	2022–23	Segunda Federación	33	10	—		—		5	1	38	11
Avilés	2023–24	Segunda Federación	34	14	1	0	—		2	0	37	14
Avilés	Total		134	55	1	0	—		10	3	145	58
Career total			629	142	14	1	0	0	10	3	653	146
