= Miguel Ángel Luque =

Spanish footballer

Personal information
- Full name: Miguel Ángel Luque Santiago
- Date of birth: 23 July 1990 (age 36)
- Place of birth: Sabadell, Spain
- Height: 1.80 m (5 ft 11 in)
- Position: Midfielder

Team information
- Current team: Manresa

Youth career
- 2000–2004: Espanyol
- 2004–2005: Ferrán Martorell
- 2005–2008: Villarreal

Senior career*
Years	Team	Apps	(Gls)
2008–2009	Villarreal C		
2009–2010	Barcelona B	21	(0)
2010–2011	Almería B	7	(0)
2011–2012	Atlético Madrid B	13	(3)
2012–2014	Puskás Akadémia	15	(1)
2014–2015	Hospitalet	24	(1)
2015–2016	Rapid București	28	(0)
2016	Manresa		
2016–2017	Lokomotiv Plovdiv	8	(0)
2017–2019	Sant Julià	43	(5)
2019–	Manresa	14	(3)

International career
2008	Spain U19	7	(0)
- * Club domestic league appearances and goals as of 14:38, 24 January 2020 (UTC)

Miguel Ángel Luque Santiago (born 23 July 1990) is a Spanish professional footballer who plays as a midfielder for CE Manresa.

== Club career ==
=== Spain ===
Born in Sabadell, Barcelona, Catalonia, Luque only played lower league football in his country. He started with Villarreal CF's third team in Tercera División, then joined FC Barcelona's reserves in Segunda División B for the 2009–10 season. He totalled 980 minutes of action in his only campaign with the latter, helping them promote to Segunda División.

In the summer of 2010, Luque signed for UD Almería, but appeared only for the B-side during his one-year spell – he was an unused substitute in two La Liga games – following which he moved to Atlético Madrid B also in the third level. He only played 20 league matches the two teams combined.

=== Puskás Akadémia ===
In 2012, Luque moved abroad and joined Puskás Akadémia FC, achieving promotion to the top flight in his first year and also winning the championship.

== Honours ==
Puskás

- Nemzeti Bajnokság II: 2012–13
