= Patterson Kaboré =

Burkinabé footballer

Personal information
- Full name: Patterson Kaboré
- Date of birth: 5 May 1990 (age 36)
- Place of birth: Ouagadougou, Burkina Faso
- Height: 1.77 m (5 ft 10 in)
- Position: Right back

Team information
- Current team: Kingston Stockade

Youth career
- 2008: JCAT

Senior career*
| Years | Team | Apps | (Gls) |
| 2009–2010 | JC Bobo Dioulasso | | |
| 2010–2012 | Almería B | 0 | (0) |
| 2011 | → Comarca Níjar (loan) | 3 | (0) |
| 2011–2012 | → Órdenes (loan) | 4 | (0) |
| 2012 | → Terrassa (loan) | 5 | (0) |
| 2013–2015 | La Roda | 16 | (0) |
| 2015 | Madridejos | 7 | (0) |
| 2016–2017 | Guria | 17 | (0) |
| 2017 | Eldense | 0 | (0) |
| 2018 | Kolkheti Poti | 10 | (0) |
| 2019– | Kingston Stockade | 0 | (0) |

International career^{‡}
| 2017– | Burkina Faso | 1 | (0) |
- * Club domestic league appearances and goals as of 23 May 2018 ‡ National team caps and goals as of 24 March 2017

Patterson Kaboré (born 5 May 1990) is a Burkinabé professional footballer who plays as a right back for Kingston Stockade FC in the National Premier Soccer League.

== Club career ==
Born in Ouagadougou, Kaboré finished his formation with Ivorian club Jeunesse Club d'Abidjan. After a short spell with JC de Bobo Dioulasso, he moved to Spain through Promoesport, and signed a contract with UD Almería.

Initially assigned to the reserves, Kaboré failed to make an appearance for the side and subsequently served loan stints at Tercera División sides CD Comarca de Níjar, SD Órdenes and Terrassa FC. Upon returning, he cut ties with the Andalusians and spent roughly a year without a club.

In October 2013, Kaboré joined La Roda CF in Segunda División B. In January 2015, after being rarely used during the season, he moved to CD Madridejos in the fourth level.

In 2016, Kaboré moved to Georgia and signed for FC Guria Lanchkhuti. In late January 2017 he returned to Spain after agreeing to a contract with CD Eldense.

== International career ==
On 13 March 2017, Kaboré was called up to the Burkina Faso national team for a friendly match with Nigeria. He made his debut eleven days later, starting in a 0–2 loss against Morocco.
