= Mané (footballer, born 1981) =

Spanish footballer

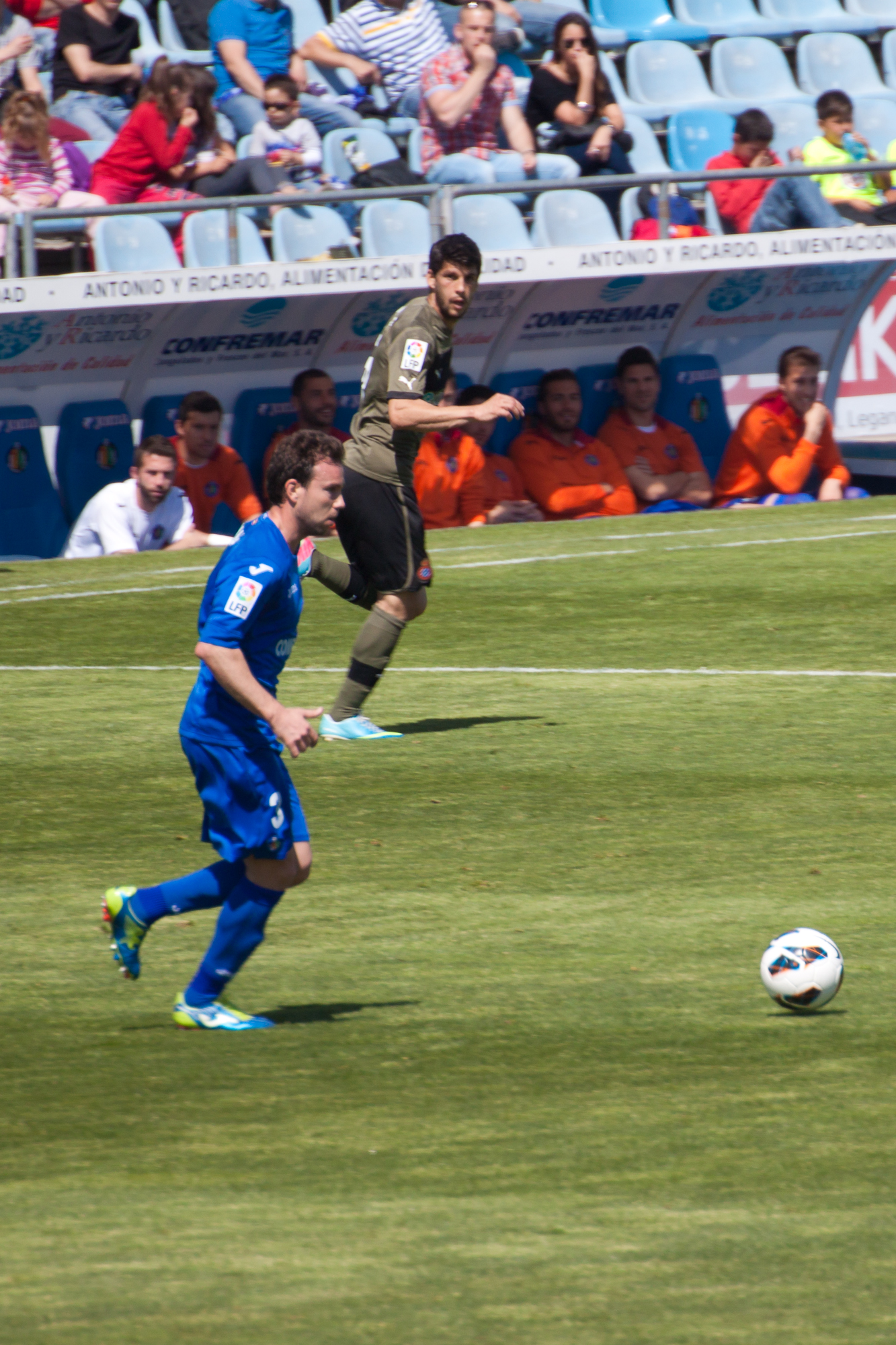
- Mané playing for Getafe in 2013

Personal information
- Full name: José Manuel Jiménez Ortiz
- Date of birth: 21 December 1981 (age 44)
- Place of birth: Tarifa, Spain
- Height: 1.75 m (5 ft 9 in)
- Position: Left-back

Youth career
- Linense

Senior career*
| Years | Team | Apps | (Gls) |
| 2000–2002 | Linense | 13 | (0) |
| 2002–2003 | Díter Zafra | 8 | (1) |
| 2003–2005 | Atlético Madrid B | 68 | (14) |
| 2005–2006 | Ciudad Murcia | 39 | (2) |
| 2006–2009 | Almería | 103 | (3) |
| 2009–2013 | Getafe | 101 | (2) |
| 2013 | Maccabi Tel Aviv | 5 | (0) |
| 2014–2015 | Almería | 14 | (0) |
| 2016–2017 | Algeciras | 16 | (0) |
| 2017 | St Joseph's | 0 | (0) |
| 2017–2018 | Algeciras | 29 | (0) |
| Total | | 395 | (22) |

Managerial career
- 2020–2022: Castellar (youth)
- 2022: Castellar
- * Club domestic league appearances and goals

José Manuel Jiménez Ortiz (born 21 December 1981), known as Mané, is a Spanish former professional footballer who played as a left-back.

Over eight seasons, he amassed La Liga totals of 183 matches and five goals in representation of Almería (four years, two spells) and Getafe (four years). He also spent a few months in the Israeli Premier League late into his 18-year senior career, with Maccabi Tel Aviv.

== Playing career ==
Born in Tarifa, Province of Cádiz, Mané started playing professional football with lowly Real Balompédica Linense and CD Díter Zafra, being limited to just eight Segunda División B games with the latter team. In 2003, he moved to Atlético Madrid B of the same level.

For 2005–06, Mané progressed to the Segunda División, joining Ciudad de Murcia and scoring two league goals during his spell at the Estadio de La Condomina. The following season he moved clubs again, this time to UD Almería; he quickly became first-choice, being instrumental in the side's first-ever promotion to La Liga.

Mané's Almería performances were much admired over the course of 2007–08, represented by him being named in Sky Sports pundit Guillem Balagué's team of the campaign as the Andalusians overachieved and finished eighth. The player scored twice in the process, in 1–1 draws with RCD Mallorca and Recreativo de Huelva.

On 3 June 2009, after appearing in 105 competitive matches for Almería (he would eventually total 125 across two spells), Mané signed a four-year contract with Getafe CF. An undisputed starter throughout his first season, he scored his first goal for the Madrilenians on 13 April 2010, in a 3–0 home win over Villarreal CF.

On 3 July 2013, aged nearly 32, Mané moved abroad for the first time, agreeing to a two-year deal at Maccabi Tel Aviv FC. He made his debut 20 days later, starting against Győri ETO FC in the qualifying rounds of the UEFA Champions League. He returned to former club Almería on 23 December, signing for 18 months.

== Managerial career ==
Mané retired in June 2018 at the age of 36, after two seasons with amateurs Algeciras CF. He then became their sporting director, leaving his post in early November 2019 after falling out with the board of directors.

In summer 2020, Mané was hired as youth manager at UD Castellar. On 22 April 2022, he took charge of the first team.

== Personal life ==
From 2007 to 2009, Mané Ortiz was one of three Almería players with that surname, José Ortiz and Juan Manuel Ortiz being the others.
