= Baltasar Rigo =

Spanish footballer

Balatasar Rigo
Personal information
- Full name: Baltasar Rigo Cifré
- Date of birth: 26 June 1985 (age 41)
- Place of birth: Campos, Spain
- Height: 1.85 m (6 ft 1 in)
- Position: Centre-back

Team information
- Current team: Campos

Youth career
- Campos
- Mallorca

Senior career*
Years	Team	Apps	(Gls)
2004–2006	Mallorca B	5	(0)
2006–2009	Huesca	47	(4)
2009–2010	Almería B	24	(2)
2010	Almería	1	(0)
2011	Huesca	11	(0)
2011–2012	Girona	10	(1)
2012	Numancia	1	(0)
2013–2014	Tenerife	12	(1)
2014–2015	Campos	5	(1)
2015	Guiljuelo	7	(0)
2015–2017	Llosetense	45	(5)
2017–	Campos	103	(8)
- * Club domestic league appearances and goals as of 12:37, 2 June 2026 (UTC)

Baltasar Rigo Cifré (born 26 June 1985) is a Spanish footballer who plays as a central defender for Tercera Federación club CE Campos.

== Club career ==
Rigo was born in Campos, Mallorca, Balearic Islands. A product of local RCD Mallorca's youth ranks, he made his senior debut in the 2004–05 season in the Segunda División B, being relegated. After a second year, he signed for SD Huesca in the same league, appearing in only two matches as the Aragonese club achieved a first-ever promotion to Segunda División in 2008 (22 minutes of action).

In the summer of 2009, Rigo moved to Tercera División with UD Almería B on a free transfer, being an important defensive unit to help them promote to the third tier for the first time. Subsequently, he was promoted to the main squad by manager Juan Manuel Lillo, also signing a professional contract.

On 5 December 2010, Rigo made his debut for Almería's first team, starting – but also conceding a penalty and being booked – in a 1–1 home draw against Real Zaragoza for his only La Liga appearance. In the following transfer window, however, he left Andalusia and returned to Huesca.

Rigo joined fellow second-division Girona FC on 5 July 2011. He scored his only goal as a professional on 26 August, but in a 1–4 home loss to Elche CF.
