= José Ortiz (footballer, born 1977) =

Spanish footballer

Personal information
- Full name: José Ortiz Bernal
- Date of birth: 4 August 1977 (age 49)
- Place of birth: Almería, Spain
- Height: 1.72 m (5 ft 8 in)
- Position: Attacking midfielder

Youth career
- 1990–1996: Zapillo Atlético

Senior career*
Years	Team	Apps	(Gls)
1996–1997	Roquetas	1	(0)
1997–1999	Almería	20	(1)
1999–2000	Ravenna	11	(1)
2000–2012	Almería	297	(41)
Total		329	(43)
- * Club domestic league appearances and goals

José Ortiz Bernal (born 4 August 1977) is a Spanish former professional footballer who played usually as an attacking midfielder.

Most of his 16-year senior career was spent at Almería, where amassed La Liga totals of 82 games and one goal (adding 168 matches and 30 goals in the Segunda División). Over two spells, he totalled a club-best 338 competitive appearances.

== Club career ==
Ortíz was born in Almería, Andalusia. He began playing with his hometown club UD Almería (then in the Segunda División B), then served an uneventful stint abroad with Italy's Ravenna Calcio.

Upon his return to Almería, Ortiz helped the side to achieve promotion to Segunda División in 2002, scoring five goals the following season, notably a brace against neighbours Xerez CD in a 6–0 home rout. He played with the team at every professional level, starting in the Tercera División.

Ortiz, who was the undisputed captain when in the starting XI, finished as Almería's third-best scorer in 2006–07 as they reached La Liga for the first time in their history. He scored ten goals, behind only Albert Crusat and Míchel, appearing in 24 games the following campaign mainly as a substitute.

On 3 January 2010, after just five minutes on the pitch, Ortiz scored his sole goal of the season, a last-minute winner which was the only in the home fixture against neighbours Xerez as both sides struggled immensely in the league; Almería had just recently fired manager Hugo Sánchez, but the player's role remained obscure under new boss Juan Manuel Lillo. He totalled 17 appearances, all from the bench, in only 226 minutes.

Ortiz repeated individual numbers in 2010–11 – 16 league matches, none as a starter – and the club returned to the second tier after four years. The 35-year-old was released in June 2012, after his contract was not renewed.

== Personal life ==
From 2007 to 2009, Ortiz was one of three Almería players with that surname, Mané and Juan Manuel Ortiz being the others.
