= Miguel Ángel Nieto =

Spanish footballer

Personal information
- Full name: Miguel Ángel Nieto de la Calle
- Date of birth: 12 January 1986 (age 40)
- Place of birth: San Sebastián de los Reyes, Spain
- Height: 1.84 m (6 ft 0 in)
- Position: Winger

Youth career
- 1993–2000: Juventud Sanse
- 2000–2004: Real Madrid

Senior career*
Years	Team	Apps	(Gls)
2004–2006	Real Madrid C	48	(28)
2006–2008	Real Madrid B	48	(6)
2007	Real Madrid	2	(0)
2008–2011	Almería	25	(1)
2011	→ Xerez (loan)	2	(0)
2011–2013	Numancia	42	(4)
2013–2014	Racing Santander	14	(2)
2014	Córdoba	14	(1)
2015	Lleida Esportiu	14	(1)
2015–2017	Hércules	50	(9)
2018–2019	Alcoyano	36	(3)
Total		295	(55)
- * Club domestic league appearances and goals

Miguel Ángel Nieto de la Calle (Spanish pronunciation: [miˈɣel ˈaŋxel ˈnjeto]; born 12 January 1986) is a Spanish former professional footballer who played as a right winger.

== Club career ==
A Real Madrid youth graduate, Nieto was born in San Sebastián de los Reyes, Community of Madrid, and spent his first three professional seasons with its C-team. He sometimes trained with and was called up to the main squad, as against Racing de Santander (18 November 2006) and Valencia CF (27 November), as an unused substitute.

Nieto made his first-team debut in a match with FC Dynamo Kyiv for the 2006–07 edition of the UEFA Champions League, in a final group stage tie that ended with a 2–2 away draw. His La Liga debut was against Villarreal CF on 27 January 2007, and he also appeared the next week against Levante UD for two consecutive 0–1 defeats, although Madrid would be crowned league champions; in the latter match the player, who had replaced an injured Robinho, tried his luck with a shot which sliced the woodwork of José Francisco Molina's goal.

After spending one full season with Real Madrid Castilla in the third division, Nieto signed a five-year deal with 2007–08's top flight overachievers UD Almería on 1 July 2008, after finishing his contract with Real Madrid. Rarely played in his first year he did score an important goal, in a 3–1 home win against Sporting de Gijón on 10 May 2009 which confirmed that the Andalusians would remain in the top level for a further year.

In late January 2011, having been severely undermined by injury problems under both Juan Manuel Lillo and his successor José Luis Oltra but also being deemed surplus to requirements during Hugo Sánchez's tenure as coach, Nieto was loaned to another side in the region, second level's Xerez CD, until the end of the campaign, also being rarely used. In July, he left the Estadio de los Juegos Mediterráneos.

== Honours ==
Real Madrid

- La Liga: 2006–07

Racing Santander

- Segunda División B: 2013–14
