= Juanma Ortiz (footballer, born 1982) =

Spanish footballer

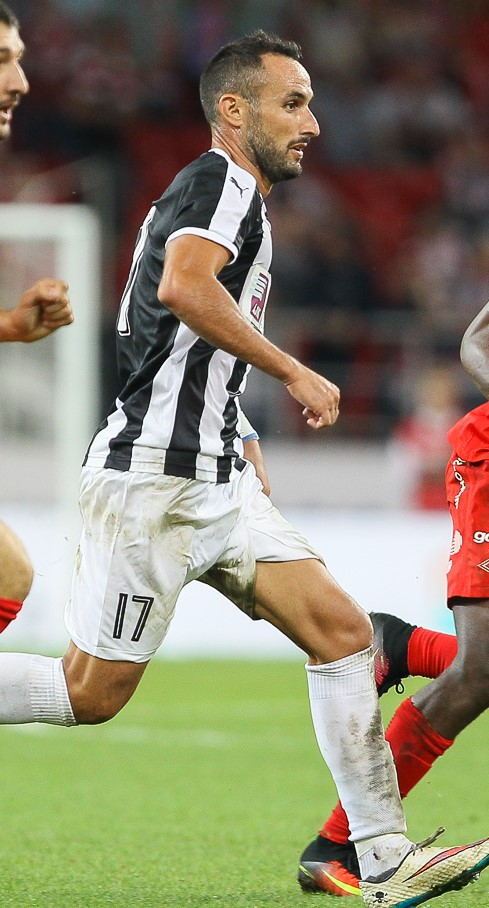
- Ortiz with AEK Larnaca in 2016

Personal information
- Full name: Juan Manuel Ortiz Palazón
- Date of birth: 1 March 1982 (age 44)
- Place of birth: Guardamar del Segura, Spain
- Height: 1.79 m (5 ft 10 in)
- Positions: Midfielder; full-back

Youth career
- CD Alone
- Kelme
- Atlético Madrid

Senior career*
Years	Team	Apps	(Gls)
2001–2003	Atlético Madrid B	65	(9)
2002–2007	Atlético Madrid	6	(0)
2004–2006	→ Osasuna (loan)	29	(2)
2006–2007	→ Poli Ejido (loan)	40	(9)
2007–2011	Almería	126	(9)
2011–2012	Rangers	10	(0)
2012	→ Almería (loan)	16	(4)
2012–2014	Granada	22	(0)
2013–2014	→ Hércules (loan)	30	(0)
2014–2017	AEK Larnaca	92	(1)
2017–2019	La Nucía	81	(2)
2020–2022	Intercity	54	(0)
Total		571	(36)
- * Club domestic league appearances and goals

Juan Manuel 'Juanma' Ortiz Palazón (born 1 March 1982) is a Spanish former professional footballer who played mainly as a right midfielder.

After starting out at Atlético Madrid, he went on to spend most of his career with Almería, appearing in 151 official matches over two spells (16 goals) whilst taking part in four La Liga seasons with the club. He also played in Scotland and Cyprus.

== Club career ==
=== Early years ===
Born in Guardamar del Segura, Province of Alicante, Valencia, Ortiz was a graduate of Atlético Madrid's youth system, where he played five first-team games during the 2003–04 season, three as a starter.

He had previously made his debut with the main squad in the 2001–02 campaign, appearing in one Segunda División match as the Colchoneros were promoted, and would spend the next three years on loan at both CA Osasuna and Polideportivo Ejido, the latter in the second level.

=== Almería ===
For 2007–08, Ortiz joined newly promoted UD Almería, where he was instrumental in helping the Andalusia side overachieve to a final eighth place in La Liga. He scored two goals, including in a 4–1 away win against neighbours Sevilla FC on 19 April 2008, and continued to be regularly used in the following top-flight seasons, inclusively as an attacking right-back.

Ortiz played as both right and left-back during the 2010–11 campaign. He netted twice in the Copa del Rey, both in a 4–3 victory over RCD Mallorca (8–6 on aggregate) in the round of 16, as the team eventually reached the competition's semi-finals for the first time in their history, being nonetheless relegated after ranking 20th and last.

From 2007 to 2009, Ortiz was one of three Almería players with that surname, Mané and José Ortiz being the others.

=== Rangers ===
Ortiz signed for Scottish Premier League club Rangers on 6 July 2011, on a three-year contract. He made his first competitive appearance 17 days later, struggling to make an impact and playing out of position in a 1–1 away draw with Heart of Midlothian. He scored his only official goal on 18 August, in a UEFA Europa League qualifier against NK Maribor.

On 30 January 2012, after a somewhat disappointing first half to his Rangers campaign, it was announced that Ortiz would rejoin Almería on loan until the end of the season. He netted three times in his first three games, awarding his team nine points after strikes against Córdoba CF (2–1, home), Girona FC (1–0, away) and Real Murcia CF (4–2, home).

=== Return to Spain ===
Following Rangers' liquidation after they entered administration, several players refused to have their contracts transferred to a new company set up by Charles Green, and both Ortiz and the club agreed on having his link terminated. On 10 July 2012, he signed a two-year contract with Granada CF.

Having signed in the summer of 2014 at the age of 32, Ortiz then spent several seasons in the Cypriot First Division with AEK Larnaca FC, sharing teams with a host of compatriots. On 29 September 2017, he returned to his country and signed with amateurs CF La Nucía, helping to a first-ever promotion to the Segunda División B in 2019.

Ortiz returned to Tercera División in December 2019, joining CF Intercity.

== Career statistics ==
As of 19 October 2015

Club	Season	League			Cup		Other		Total	
Club	Season	Division	Apps	Goals	Apps	Goals	Apps	Goals	Apps	Goals
Atlético Madrid B	2000–01	Segunda División B	1	0	—		1 (Note: Appearance in Segunda División B play-offs)	0	2	0
Atlético Madrid B	2001–02	Segunda División B	33	8	—		—		33	8
Atlético Madrid B	2002–03	Segunda División B	31	1	—		—		31	1
Atlético Madrid B	Total		65	9	—		1	0	66	9
Atlético Madrid	2001–02	Segunda División	1	0	0	0	—		1	0
Atlético Madrid	2002–03	La Liga	5	0	3	0	—		8	0
Atlético Madrid	Total		6	0	3	0	—		9	0
Osasuna (loan)	2004–05	La Liga	22	2	3	0	—		25	2
Osasuna (loan)	2005–06	La Liga	7	0	2	0	—		9	0
Osasuna (loan)	Total		29	2	5	0	—		34	2
Ejido (loan)	2006–07	Segunda División	40	9	2	1	—		42	10
Almería	2007–08	La Liga	33	2	1	0	—		34	2
Almería	2008–09	La Liga	32	4	3	0	—		35	4
Almería	2009–10	La Liga	35	2	1	0	—		36	2
Almería	2010–11	La Liga	26	1	4	3	—		30	4
Almería	Total		126	9	9	3	—		135	12
Rangers	2011–12	Scottish Premier League	10	0	0	0	4 (Note: Appearances in UEFA Europa League and UEFA Champions League)	1	14	1
Almería (loan)	2011–12	Segunda División	16	4	0	0	—		16	4
Granada	2012–13	La Liga	22	0	2	0	—		24	0
Hércules (loan)	2013–14	Segunda División	30	0	0	0	—		30	0
AEK Larnaca	2014–15	Cypriot First Division	29	0	6	0	—		35	0
AEK Larnaca	2015–16	Cypriot First Division	6	0	0	0	2 (Note: Appearances in UEFA Europa League)	0	8	0
AEK Larnaca	Total		35	0	6	0	2	0	43	0
Career total			379	33	27	4	7	1	413	38
