= Albert Crusat =

Spanish footballer (born 1982)

Personal information
- Full name: Albert Crusat Domènech
- Date of birth: 13 May 1982 (age 44)
- Place of birth: Barcelona, Spain
- Height: 1.64 m (5 ft 5 in)
- Position: Winger

Youth career
- 1993–1996: Rubí
- 1996–2000: Espanyol

Senior career*
Years	Team	Apps	(Gls)
2000–2003	Espanyol B	76	(15)
2002–2003	Espanyol	5	(0)
2003	Rayo Vallecano	5	(1)
2004–2005	Lleida	54	(7)
2005–2011	Almería	199	(33)
2011–2013	Wigan Athletic	15	(1)
2014	Bnei Sakhnin	4	(0)
Total		358	(57)

International career
1998–1999	Spain U16	10	(1)
1999	Spain U17	3	(1)
2001	Spain U18	3	(0)
Medal record
Representing Spain
UEFA European Under-16 Championship
Winner	1999 Czech Republic
- * Club domestic league appearances and goals

Albert Crusat Domènech (born 13 May 1982) is a Spanish former professional footballer who played as a left winger.

After starting out at Espanyol, he spent most of his career with Almería, appearing in 212 competitive matches and scoring 34 goals over six seasons, four of those in La Liga. He also played two years in England with Wigan Athletic.

== Club career ==
=== Early years ===
Born in Barcelona, Catalonia, Crusat was a product of local RCD Espanyol's youth system. He appeared in five games with the first team during the 2002–03 season, the first on 2 September 2002 in a 2–0 away loss against Real Madrid where he played five minutes as a starter, as the club went on to barely avoid La Liga relegation.

Subsequently, Crusat had Segunda División stints with Rayo Vallecano and UE Lleida: in the first, as the Madrid side were relegated, he only managed to take the field on five occasions, leaving in December 2003.

=== Almería ===
In 2005–06, Crusat joined UD Almería, being instrumental in the Andalusians' first-ever top-flight promotion the following season by scoring 11 goals. He missed just four games in the subsequent eighth-place finish in the 2007–08 campaign, totalling 2,693 minutes of action.

Crusat had his most successful year in the top division in 2009–10, as his team retained their status for the third consecutive year. Without the presence of striker Álvaro Negredo, he was much more depended upon in scoring matters and netted seven times in 33 matches – joint-second in the team – as they finished in 13th position (he also collected 13 yellow cards).

On 19 January 2011, Crusat scored one of Almería's most important goals, in a 3–2 win at Deportivo de La Coruña (4–2 on aggregate) which meant the club reached the semi-finals of the Copa del Rey for the first time ever.

=== Wigan Athletic ===
On 30 August 2011, it was confirmed by Wigan Athletic manager Roberto Martínez that his compatriot Crusat was having a medical after a £2 million bid was accepted by Almería. Four days later, the player completed his move to the English club, and made his Premier League debut on 10 September, appearing as a substitute in a 3–0 away loss to Manchester City.

Crusat scored his first goal for the Latics on 19 November 2011, making it 3–2 for the hosts in the 88th minute of an eventual 3–3 draw against Blackburn Rovers. He spent the vast majority of his second season on the sidelines, nursing a severe knee injury, and left the DW Stadium on 22 May 2013 after his contract expired.

=== Bnei Sakhnin ===
On 30 January 2014, after more than one year away from football, Crusat joined Bnei Sakhnin F.C. of the Israel Premier League. In September, after recurring problems in his knee, he retired at the age of 32 and with the intention of getting a manager degree.

== Honours ==
Lleida

- Segunda División B: 2003–04

Spain U16

- UEFA European Under-16 Championship: 1999
