= 2012–13 UD Almería season =

UD Almería
2012–13 season
- President: Alfonso García
- Head coach: Javi Gracia
- Stadium: Juegos Mediterráneos
- Liga Adelante: 3rd (promoted)
- Copa del Rey: Round of 32
- Top goalscorer: League: Charles (27); All: Charles (32)
- Highest home attendance: 13,000 (2-2 Barcelona B, 13/01/2013)
Home colours	Away colours	Third colours

Is the 2012–13 UD Almería season. The club plays in two tournaments: the Segunda División and the Copa del Rey. It is the second season since the club had been relegated from La Liga.

On 22 June, Almería is promoted to La Liga, after defeating Girona in the play-offs. Charles finished the season as the club and division topscorer.

== Players ==
=== Squad ===
Retrieved on 11 August 2012

Note: Flags indicate national team as defined under FIFA eligibility rules; some limited exceptions apply. Players may hold more than one non-FIFA nationality.

No.	Pos.	Nation	Player
1	GK	ESP	Esteban
3	DF	URU	Marcelo Silva
4	DF	ARG	Hernán Pellerano
5	DF	ESP	Ángel Trujillo
6	MF	ESP	Fernando Soriano (vice captain)
7	MF	ESP	Verza
8	MF	ESP	Aleix Vidal
9	FW	BRA	Charles
10	MF	ESP	Rubén Suárez
11	MF	ESP	Abel Molinero

No.	Pos.	Nation	Player
14	MF	ESP	Iago Falqué (on loan from Tottenham)
15	MF	ESP	Corona (captain)
17	DF	ESP	Álvaro Mejía
18	DF	ESP	Christian
19	MF	ESP	Carlos Calvo
20	DF	ESP	Rafita
21	DF	URU	Adrián Gunino (on loan from Fénix)
22	MF	ESP	Miguel Pallardó (on loan from Levante)
25	GK	ESP	Diego
33	FW	BFA	Jonathan Zongo

==== Youth team players ====
Note: Flags indicate national team as defined under FIFA eligibility rules; some limited exceptions apply. Players may hold more than one non-FIFA nationality.

No.	Pos.	Nation	Player
26	DF	ESP	Pedro Alcalá
27	GK	AUT	Pirmin Strasser
28	DF	ESP	Raúl García
29	MF	NGR	Ramon Azeez

No.	Pos.	Nation	Player
31	MF	ESP	Joselu
32	FW	ESP	Chumbi
34	MF	ESP	Alberto
35	FW	ESP	Edgar Méndez

=== Transfers ===
==== In ====
No.	Pos.	Nat.	Name	Age	EU	Moving from	Type	Transfer window	Ends	Transfer fee	Source
5	DF	(Spain)	Ángel Trujillo	24	EU	Almería B	Promoted ✓	Summer	2013	Free	
		(Spain)	Javi Gracia	42	EU	Kerkyra (Greece)	Job Offer ✓	Summer	2013	Free	
11	MF	(Spain)	Abel Molinero	23	EU	Almería B	Promoted ✓	Summer	2014	Free	
3	DF	(Uruguay)	Marcelo Silva	23	EU	Peñarol (Uruguay)	Loan Return ✓	Summer	2016	Free	
4	DF	(Argentina)	Hernán Pellerano	28	EU	Newell's Old Boys (Argentina)	Loan Return ✓	Summer	2014	Free	
18	DF	(Spain)	Christian	26	EU	Racing Santander	Transfer ✓	Summer	2014	Free	
9	FW	(Brazil)	Charles	28	EU	Córdoba	Transfer ✓	Summer	2016	Undisclosed	
17	DF	(Spain)	Álvaro Mejía	30	EU	Konyaspor (Turkey)	Transfer ✓	Summer	2013	Free	
21	DF	(Uruguay)	Adrián Gunino	23	EU	Fénix (Uruguay)	Loan ✓	Summer	2013	Free	
22	MF	(Spain)	Javi Casquero	36	EU	Getafe	Transfer ✓	Summer	2013	Free	
19	MF	(Spain)	Carlos Calvo	26	EU	Udinese (Italy)	Transfer ✓	Summer	2013	Free	
10	MF	(Spain)	Rubén Suárez	33	EU	Guizhou Renhe (Chile)	Transfer ✓	Winter	2014	Free	
14	MF	(Spain)	Iago Falqué	23	EU	Tottenham Hotspur (England)	Loan ✓	Winter	2013	Free	
22	MF	(Spain)	Miguel Pallardó	26	EU	Levante	Loan ✓	Winter	2013	Free	

Total spending: ▼€0

==== Out ====
No.	Pos.	Nat.	Name	Age	EU	Moving to	Type	Transfer window	Transfer fee	Source
18	DF	(Peru)	Acasiete	34	EU	Cienciano (Peru)	Contract Ended ✓	Summer	Free	
24	DF	(Spain)	Dani Bautista	31	EU	Racing Santander (Spain)	Contract Ended ✓	Summer	Free	
10	MF	(Spain)	José Ortiz	34	EU	Free agent	Contract Ended ✓	Summer	Free	
21	DF	(Spain)	Carlos García	28	EU	Maccabi Tel Aviv (Israel)	Contract Ended ✓	Summer	Free	
16	DF	(Brazil)	Michel	22	EU	Atlético Mineiro (Brazil)	Loan ✓	Summer	Free	
5	MF	(Argentina)	Hernán Bernardello	25	EU	Colón (Argentina)	Loan ✓	Summer	Free	
2	DF	(Denmark)	Michael Jakobsen	26	EU	Copenhagen (Denmark)	Transfer ✓	Summer	Undisclosed	
10	FW	(Sweden)	Henok Goitom	27	EU	AIK (Sweden)	Contract Terminated ✓	Summer	Free	
10	MF	(Spain)	Aarón Ñíguez	23	EU	Elche	Contract Terminated ✓	Winter	Free	
23	FW	(Argentina)	Leonardo Ulloa	26	EU	Brighton & Hove Albion (England)	Transfer ✓	Winter	€1,8M	
22	MF	(Spain)	Javi Casquero	36	EU	Sporting de Gijón	Contract Terminated ✓	Winter	Free	

Total gaining: ▲€1,800,000

== Player statistics ==
=== Squad Stats ===
As of 23 June 2013

No.	Pos	Nat	Player	Total		Segunda División		Copa del Rey		Promotion play-offs	
No.	Pos	Nat	Player	Apps	Goals	Apps	Goals	Apps	Goals	Apps	Goals
1	GK	(Spain) ESP	Esteban	46	0	42	0	0	0	4	0
3	DF	(Uruguay) URU	Marcelo Silva	23	1	19+1	1	3	0	0	0
4	DF	(Argentina) ARG	Hernán Pellerano	28	1	24	1	0	0	4	0
5	DF	(Spain) ESP	Ángel Trujillo	35	0	25+2	0	4	0	4	0
6	MF	(Spain) ESP	Fernando Soriano	44	12	36+2	12	1+1	0	4	0
7	MF	(Spain) ESP	Verza	47	2	40	2	3	0	4	0
8	MF	(Spain) ESP	Aleix Vidal	44	7	30+6	4	1+3	1	4	2
9	FW	(Brazil) BRA	Charles	47	32	36+4	27	2+1	0	4	5
10	MF	(Spain) ESP	Rubén Suárez	19	1	1+17	1	0	0	0+1	0
11	MF	(Spain) ESP	Abel Molinero	12	2	0+8	0	4	2	0	0
14	MF	(Spain) ESP	Iago Falqué	22	2	17+1	2	0	0	4	0
15	MF	(Spain) ESP	Corona	38	4	30+3	4	0+1	0	4	0
17	DF	(Spain) ESP	Álvaro Mejía	28	1	19+3	1	1+1	0	0+4	0
18	DF	(Spain) ESP	Christian	36	6	32	6	1	0	3	0
19	MF	(Spain) ESP	Carlos Calvo	37	2	17+15	2	0+1	0	0+4	0
20	DF	(Spain) ESP	Rafita	23	0	22	0	1	0	0	0
21	DF	(Uruguay) URU	Adrián Gunino	31	0	22+1	0	4	0	4	0
22	MF	(Spain) ESP	Miguel Pallardó	10	0	2+8	0	0	0	0	0
25	GK	(Spain) ESP	Diego García	4	0	0	0	4	0	0	0
26	DF	(Spain) ESP	Pedro Alcalá	0	0	0	0	0	0	0	0
27	GK	(Austria) AUT	Pirmin Strasser	0	0	0	0	0	0	0	0
28	DF	(Spain) ESP	Raúl García	10	1	8	1	2	0	0	0
29	MF	(Nigeria) NGR	Ramon Azeez	4	0	0+2	0	0+2	0	0	0
31	MF	(Spain) ESP	Joselu	1	0	0+1	0	0	0	0	0
32	FW	(Spain) ESP	Chumbi	13	1	0+12	1	0+1	0	0	0
33	FW	(Burkina Faso) BFA	Jonathan	30	2	8+16	1	3	1	0+3	0
34	MF	(Spain) ESP	Alberto	0	0	0	0	0	0	0	0
35	FW	(Spain) ESP	Edgar Méndez	0	0	0	0	0	0	0	0
Players who have left the club after the start of the season:
10	MF	(Spain) ESP	Aarón	20	2	12+5	1	3	1	0	0
22	MF	(Spain) ESP	Javi Casquero	18	1	9+5	1	4	0	0	0
23	FW	(Argentina) ARG	Leonardo Ulloa	22	6	10+8	4	4	2	0	0

=== Top scorers ===
Place	Position	Nation	Number	Name	Segunda División	Copa del Rey	Promotion play-offs	Total
1	FW	(Brazil)	9	Charles	27	0	5	32
2	MF	(Spain)	6	Fernando Soriano	12	0	0	12
3	MF	(Spain)	8	Aleix Vidal	4	1	2	7
4	DF	(Spain)	18	Christian	6	0	0	6
4	FW	(Argentina)	23	Leonardo Ulloa	4	2	0	6
5	MF	(Spain)	15	Corona	4	0	0	4
6	MF	(Spain)	7	Verza	2	0	0	2
6	FW	(Burkina Faso)	33	Jonathan	1	1	0	2
6	MF	(Spain)	11	Abel Molinero	0	2	0	2
6	MF	(Spain)	14	Iago Falqué	2	0	0	2
6	MF	(Spain)	19	Carlos Calvo	2	0	0	2
6	MF	(Spain)	10	Aarón	1	1	0	2
7	DF	(Uruguay)	3	Marcelo Silva	1	0	0	1
7	DF	(Argentina)	4	Hernán Pellerano	1	0	0	1
7	MF	(Spain)	10	Rubén Suárez	1	0	0	1
7	DF	(Spain)	17	Álvaro Mejía	1	0	0	1
7	DF	(Spain)	28	Raúl García	1	0	0	1
7	FW	(Spain)	32	Chumbi	1	0	0	1
7	MF	(Spain)	22	Javi Casquero	1	0	0	1
				TOTALS	72	7	7	86

=== Disciplinary record ===
Number	Nation	Position	Name	Segunda División		Copa del Rey		Promotion play-offs		Total	
Number	Nation	Position	Name	Yellow card	Red card	Yellow card	Red card	Yellow card	Red card	Yellow card	Red card
6	(Spain)	MF	Fernando Soriano	13	1	1	0	3	0	17	1
7	(Spain)	MF	Verza	9	0	1	0	1	0	11	0
18	(Spain)	DF	Christian	9	0	0	0	2	0	11	0
9	(Brazil)	FW	Charles	8	0	1	0	2	0	11	0
15	(Spain)	MF	Corona	7	0	0	0	2	0	9	0
20	(Spain)	DF	Rafita	8	0	0	0	0	0	8	0
21	(Uruguay)	DF	Adrián Gunino	6	0	0	0	2	0	8	0
4	(Argentina)	DF	Hernán Pellerano	6	2	0	0	1	0	7	2
10	(Spain)	MF	Rubén Suárez	5	0	0	0	1	0	6	0
17	(Spain)	DF	Álvaro Mejía	5	0	0	0	1	0	6	0
10	(Spain)	MF	Aarón	4	0	1	1	0	0	5	1
33	(Burkina Faso)	FW	Jonathan	4	0	1	0	0	0	5	0
3	(Uruguay)	DF	Marcelo Silva	4	1	0	0	0	0	4	1
5	(Spain)	DF	Trujillo	3	0	0	0	0	0	3	0
22	(Spain)	MF	Miguel Pallardó	3	0	0	0	0	0	3	0
23	(Argentina)	FW	Leonardo Ulloa	3	0	0	0	0	0	3	0
22	(Spain)	MF	Javi Casquero	2	0	1	0	0	0	3	0
8	(Spain)	MF	Aleix Vidal	2	0	0	0	0	0	2	0
25	(Spain)	GK	Diego García	2	0	0	0	0	0	2	0
1	(Spain)	GK	Esteban	1	0	0	0	1	0	2	0
14	(Spain)	MF	Iago Falqué	1	0	0	0	1	0	2	0
19	(Spain)	MF	Carlos Calvo	1	0	0	0	1	0	2	0
29	(Nigeria)	MF	Ramon Azeez	1	0	0	0	0	0	1	0
			TOTALS	102	3	6	1	18	0	126	4

== Competition ==
=== Segunda División ===
Pos	Team	Pld	W	D	L	GF	GA	GD	Pts	Promotion, qualification or relegation
1	Elche (C, P)	42	23	13	6	54	27	+27	82	Promotion to La Liga
2	Villarreal (P)	42	21	14	7	68	38	+30	77	Promotion to La Liga
3	Almería (P)	42	22	8	12	72	50	+22	74	Qualification to promotion play-offs
4	Girona	42	21	8	13	74	56	+18	71	Qualification to promotion play-offs
5	Alcorcón	42	21	6	15	57	55	+2	69	Qualification to promotion play-offs

Source: LFP - Liga Adelante
Rules for classification: 1st points; 2nd head-to-head points; 3rd head-to-head goal difference; 4th head-to-head goals scored; 5th goal difference; 6th number of goals scored; 7th Fair-play points
(C) Champions; (P) Promoted

==== Results summary ====
Overall								Home						Away					
Pld	W	D	L	GF	GA	GD	Pts	W	D	L	GF	GA	GD	W	D	L	GF	GA	GD
42	22	8	12	72	50	+22	74	12	5	4	37	19	+18	10	3	8	35	31	+4

Last updated: 8 June 2013.

==== Results by round ====
Round	1	2	3	4	5	6	7	8	9	10	11	12	13	14	15	16	17	18	19	20	21	22	23	24	25	26	27	28	29	30	31	32	33	34	35	36	37	38	39	40	41	42
Home/Away	H	H	A	H	A	H	A	H	A	A	H	A	H	A	H	A	H	A	H	A	H	H	A	A	H	A	H	A	H	H	A	H	A	H	A	H	A	H	A	A	H	A
Result	W	W	L	W	D	D	W	W	L	W	W	W	D	D	W	W	L	L	L	W	D	D	W	L	W	D	W	W	L	L	W	W	L	D	L	W	W	W	W	L	W	L
Position	4	2	2	3	3	3	4	2	2	2	2	2	3	3	2	2	2	3	4	4	3	2	2	2	2	2	2	2	2	3	4	3	2	5	5	5	5	4	3	3	3	3

W = Win; D = Draw; L = Loss

=== Competitive ===
==== Pre-season ====
22 July 2012	Almería	3 – 0	Levante	Murcia
10:30	Charles 3'; Jonathan 31'; Ulloa 46'	Report		Stadium: La Manga Club; Attendance: 200

29 July 2012	Murcia	1 – 4	Almería	Murcia
20:00	Kike 36'	Report	20' Charles; 37' Rafita; 49' Aarón; 90+' Chumbi	Stadium: La Manga Club

31 July 2012	Águilas	0 – 5	Almería	Águilas
		Report	34' Raúl García; 40' 48' 65' Chumbi; 67' Christian	Stadium: El Rubial; Referee: Sánchez Hernández

4 August 2012	Almería	1 – 0	Cartagena	Totana
	Aarón 32' (pen.)	Report		Stadium: Juan Cayuela; Attendance: 500

5 August 2012	Almería	1 – 2	Almería B	Almería
	Abel 10'; Azeez 87' (o.g.)	Report	30' Rubén Primo	Stadium: Training Field; Attendance: 200

10 August 2012 Trofeo Festa d'Elx	Elche	1 – 3	Almería	Elche
21:00	Mantecón 77' (pen.)	Report	4' 90' Charles; 29' Casquero	Stadium: Martínez Valero; Referee: Lesma López

==== Segunda División ====
17 August 2012 Round 1	Barcelona B	4 – 5	Almería	Barcelona
19:00	Dongou 5'; Deulofeu 12' 58' 89'; Planas (red card) 44'; Ilie (yellow card) 64'; Araujo (yellow card) 81'	Report	(yellow card) 11' (goal) 19' Charles; 13' 48' Soriano; (yellow card) 44' (goal) 89' Christian; (yellow card) 60' Azeez; 82' Ulloa; (yellow card) 89' Verza	Stadium: Mini Estadi; Attendance: 2,300; Referee: Jaime Latre

24 August 2012 Round 2	Almería	2 – 1	Xerez	Almería
21:00	Charles 9' 26'; Rafita (yellow card) 46'; Álvaro Mejía (yellow card) 73'	Report	(yellow card) 21' Israel; 23' José Vega; (yellow card) 45' Raúl Cámara; (yellow card) 48' Álvaro Silva; (yellow card) 57' David Prieto; (yellow card) 81' Mendoza	Stadium: Juegos Mediterráneos; Attendance: 5,814; Referee: Arcediano Monescillo

1 September 2012 Round 3	Almería	1 – 0	Real Madrid Castilla	Almería
22:00	Ulloa 23'; Diego García (yellow card) 40'; Aleix Vidal (yellow card) 52'; Charles (yellow card) 60'; Pellerano (red card) 80'; Christian (yellow card) 89'; Soriano (yellow card) 89'	Report	(yellow card) 19' Morata; (yellow card) 64' Fabinho; (yellow card) 70' Jorge Casado; (yellow card) 78' Nacho	Stadium: Juegos Mediterráneos; Attendance: 7,184; Referee: Arias López

8 September 2012 Round 4	Sabadell	3 – 0	Almería	Sabadell
18:00	Ciércoles (yellow card) 10'; Aníbal Zurdo 25' 34' 51'; Fito (yellow card) 78'	Report	(yellow card) 64' Ulloa; (yellow card) 67' Charles	Stadium: Nova Creu Alta; Attendance: 2,126; Referee: González Fuertes

15 September 2012 Round 5	Almería	4 – 0	Guadalajara	Almería
18:00	Soriano 18' (yellow card) 30'; Gunino (yellow card) 23'; Aleix Vidal 35'; Christian 55'; Aarón 85'	Report	(yellow card) 37' Álex Ortiz; (yellow card) 84' Vicente	Stadium: Juegos Mediterráneos; Attendance: 5,737; Referee: José María Sánchez Martínez

22 September 2012 Round 6	Ponferradina	2 – 2	Almería	Ponferrada
18:00	Lafuente 12'; Yuri 44'; Máyor (yellow card) 76'; Orlando Quintana (yellow card) 89'	Report	17' (yellow card) 68' Soriano; (yellow card) 44' Álvaro Mejía; (yellow card) 49' Javi Casquero; (yellow card) 64' Trujillo; 70' Ulloa	Stadium: El Toralín; Attendance: 5,500; Referee: Pérez Pallas

30 September 2012 Round 7	Almería	0 – 0	Hércules	Almería
20:30	Aarón Ñíguez (yellow card) 29'; Verza (yellow card) 70'	Summary	Mora (yellow card) 51'; Pere Sastre (yellow card) 57'; Escassi (red card) 89'	Stadium: Juegos Mediterráneos; Attendance: 5,814; Referee: Jorge Valdés Aller

6 October 2012 Round 8	Las Palmas	1 – 2	Almería	Las Palmas
18:30	Javi Castellano (yellow card) 44'; Pignol (yellow card) 48'; Macky (yellow card) 61'; Barbosa (red card) 82'; Thievy 86'	Report	(yellow card) 20' Gunino; (yellow card) 53' Aarón; 57' Verza; (yellow card) 75' Christian; (yellow card) 76' Corona; (yellow card) 80' Jonathan; 85' (yellow card) 89' Charles	Stadium: Estadio Gran Canaria; Attendance: 9,160; Referee: Medie Jiménez

14 October 2012 Round 9	Almería	3 – 0	Córdoba	Almería
20:30	Calvo 15'; Corona (yellow card) 39'; Álvaro Mejía (yellow card) 50'; Aarón (yellow card) 55'; Charles 67'; Ulloa 80'	Report	(yellow card) 14' Dubarbier; (red card) 64' Fuentes; (yellow card) 66' Alberto Aguilar	Stadium: Juegos Mediterráneos; Attendance: 5,805; Referee: Piñeiro Crespo

20 October 2012 Round 10	Sporting Gijón	2 – 1	Almería	Gijón
18:00	Grégory (yellow card) 22'; Bilić 47' (yellow card) 88'; Carmona 77'; Gastón Sangoy (yellow card) 87'; Juan Muñiz (yellow card) 88'	Report	(yellow card) 22' Christian; (yellow card) 35' (goal) 68' Verza; (yellow card) 44' Corona; (yellow card) 87' Rafita	Stadium: El Molinón; Attendance: 17,000; Referee: Juan Martínez Munuera

27 October 2012 Round 11	Almería	1 – 0	Huesca	Almería
16:00	Charles 87'; Aarón (yellow card) 89'	Report	(yellow card) 16' Llamas; (yellow card) 46' Borja; (yellow card) 71' Camacho; (yellow card) 77' Sergio; (yellow card) 80' Helguera; (yellow card) 87' Alex Pérez; (yellow card) 87' Luis; (yellow card) 88' Jorge	Stadium: Juegos Mediterráneos; Attendance: 5,000; Referee: López Acera

4 November 2012 Round 12	Recreativo	0 – 2	Almería	Huelva
20:30	Matamala (yellow card) 35'; Morcillo (yellow card) 71'; Rubio (yellow card) 79'; Manolo (yellow card) 88'	Report	(yellow card) 16' Rafita; 21' Raúl García; (yellow card) 50' Trujillo; 61' Álvaro Mejía	Stadium: Nuevo Colombino; Referee: José María Sánchez Martínez

11 November 2012 Round 13	Almería	0 – 0	Mirandés	Almería
16:00	Corona (yellow card) 44'; Verza (yellow card) 53'; Soriano (yellow card) 64'; Charles (yellow card) 83'	Report	(yellow card) 83' Iván Agustín	Stadium: Juegos Mediterráneos; Attendance: 4,749; Referee: Bikandi Garrido

18 November 2012 Round 14	Numancia	0 – 0	Almería	Soria
18:00	Satrústegui (yellow card) 27'; Juanma (yellow card) 31'; Antonio Tomás (yellow card) 89'	Report	(yellow card) 23' Aarón; (yellow card) 81' Álvaro Mejía; (yellow card) 89' Diego García	Stadium: Los Pajaritos; Attendance: 3,000; Referee: Ricardo de Burgos Bengoetxea

25 November 2012 Round 15	Almería	3 – 2	Murcia	Almería
17:00	Soriano 1' 30' (yellow card) 79'; Rafita (yellow card) 16'; Javi Casquero 63'	Report	(yellow card) 46' Catalá; 46' Saúl Berjón; 65' (yellow card) 69' Ruso	Stadium: Juegos Mediterráneos; Attendance: 5,620; Referee: Prieto Iglesias

2 December 2012 Round 16	Racing	3 – 4	Almería	Santander
12:00	Óscar Pérez (yellow card) 3' (goal) 52'; Jairo 16' (yellow card) 41' (goal) 88'; Alonso (yellow card) 24'; David Ferreiro (yellow card) 45'; Rivero (yellow card) 84'; Julián Luque (yellow card) 89'; Koné (yellow card) 89'; Daniel Sotres (yellow card) 89'	Report	8' 29' 31' Charles; (yellow card) 14' Gunino; (yellow card) 55' (goal) 89' Soriano; (yellow card) 63' Rafita; (yellow card) 69' Verza; (yellow card) 87' Silva	Stadium: El Sardinero; Attendance: 6,517; Referee: Arcediano Monescillo

8 December 2012 Round 17	Almería	0 – 1	Lugo	Almería
18:00	Javi Casquero (yellow card) 11'; Silva (yellow card) 72'; Ulloa (yellow card) 87'	Report	(yellow card) 41' (goal) 63' Óscar Díaz; (yellow card) 44' Seoane; (yellow card) 53' Manuel Pavón; (yellow card) 87' David de Coz	Stadium: Juegos Mediterráneos; Attendance: 4,952; Referee: Jaime Latre

16 December 2012 Round 18	Elche	1 – 0	Almería	Elche
12:00	Mantecón (yellow card) 28'; Xabier Etxeita 70'; Powel (yellow card) 86'; Damián (yellow card) 87'	Report	(yellow card) 27' Verza; (yellow card) 52' Charles	Stadium: Martínez Valero; Attendance: 16,924; Referee: Trujillo Suárez

23 December 2012 Round 19	Almería	0 – 1	Alcorcón	Almería
22:02	Álvaro Mejía (yellow card) 58'; Ulloa (yellow card) 89'	Report	10' Nagore; (yellow card) 33' Camille; (yellow card) 35' Laguardia; (red card) 89' Kike López	Stadium: Juegos Mediterráneos; Attendance: 4,034; Referee: Medie Jiménez

6 January 2013 Round 20	Girona	0 – 1	Almería	Girona
12:00	Chus Herrero (yellow card) 30'	Report	(yellow card) 84' Charles; 90+2' Chumbi	Stadium: Montilivi; Attendance: 4,550; Referee: Valdés Aller

12 January 2013 Round 21	Almería	1 – 1	Villarreal	Almería
20:00	Silva (yellow card) 32'; Corona 48'; Pellerano (yellow card) 32' (red card) 60'; Soriano (yellow card) 60'; Verza (yellow card) 89'	Report	(yellow card) 30' Jaume; (yellow card) 48' Juan Carlos; (yellow card) 54' Cani; 62' Mellberg; (yellow card) 72' Mateo; (yellow card) 89' Bruno	Stadium: Juegos Mediterráneos; Attendance: 6,395; Referee: Sureda Cuenca

20 January 2013 Round 22	Almería	2 – 2	Barcelona B	Almería
17:00	Jonathan 31'; Charles 52'; Esteban (yellow card) 64'; Silva (yellow card) 34' (red card) 64'; Soriano (yellow card) 72'	Report	13' Lobato; (yellow card) 41' Javier Espinosa; 88' (o.g.) Verza	Stadium: Juegos Mediterráneos; Attendance: 13,000; Referee: Pino Zamorano

27 January 2013 Round 23	Xerez	0 – 2	Almería	Jerez de la Frontera
17:00	Maldonado (yellow card) 4'; Álvaro Rey (yellow card) 22'; Adrián (yellow card) 49'; Rafa García (yellow card) 63'; Keita (yellow card) 79'	Report	(yellow card) 30' Pellerano; 41' Corona; 43' Charles; (yellow card) 84' Christian; (yellow card) 87' Gunino	Stadium: Municipal de Chapín; Attendance: 5,202; Referee: Piñeiro Crespo

4 February 2013 Round 24	Real Madrid Castilla	2 – 1	Almería	Madrid
21:00	Jesé 24'; Morata 67'; Jorge Casado (yellow card) 79'; Iván González (yellow card) 82'	Report	6' Charles; (yellow card) 44' Jonathan; (yellow card) 60' Iago; (yellow card) 71' Rubén; (yellow card) 72' Soriano; (yellow card) 88' Pellerano	Stadium: Alfredo di Stéfano; Attendance: 1,900; Referee: Ocón Arráiz

9 February 2013 Round 25	Almería	5 – 1	Sabadell	Almería
21:00	Charles 5' 89'; Corona 31'; Silva 53'; Christian (yellow card) 55'; Soriano 72'	Report	(yellow card) 33' Goni; (yellow card) 42' Abraham Paz; (yellow card) 60' (red card) 71' Óscar Ramírez; (yellow card) 79' Ciércoles; 82' (o.g.) Christian	Stadium: Juegos Mediterráneos; Attendance: 9,720; Referee: Arcediano Monescillo

16 February 2013 Round 26	Guadalajara	2 – 2	Almería	Guadalajara
18:00	Javi Barral 1'; Azkorra 20'; Álex Ortiz (yellow card) 41'; Razak (red card) 44'	Report	(yellow card) 32' Jonathan; 44' (pen.) Charles; (yellow card) 49' Rafita; 76' Christian; (yellow card) 84' Rubén; (yellow card) 89' Calvo	Stadium: Pedro Escartín; Attendance: 3,200; Referee: Lesma López

23 February 2013 Round 27	Almería	4 – 1	Ponferradina	Almería
17:00	Corona 7'; Charles 38'; Soriano 47'; Iago 66'	Report	20' (o.g.) Charles; (yellow card) 38' Máyor; (yellow card) 58' Juande	Stadium: Juegos Mediterráneos; Attendance: 8,000; Referee: González Fuertes

2 March 2013 Round 28	Hércules	0 – 2	Almería	Alicante
16:00	Mario (yellow card) 42'; Edu Bedia (yellow card) 55'; Pamarot (yellow card) 82'	Report	54' 87' Charles	Stadium: José Rico Pérez; Attendance: 6,500; Referee: Prieto Iglesias

9 March 2013 Round 29	Almería	2 – 3	Las Palmas	Almería
20:00	Calvo (yellow card) 7'; Charles 60'; Rubén 81'; Iago (yellow card) 89'	Report	(yellow card) 13' (red card) 44' Vitolo; (yellow card) 15' Javi Castellano; 22' 89' (yellow card) 89' Murillo; 28' Chrisantus; (yellow card) 50' Deivid; (yellow card) 51' Barbosa; (yellow card) 88' Vicente Gómez	Stadium: Juegos Mediterráneos; Attendance: 9,682; Referee: José María Sánchez Martínez

17 March 2013 Round 30	Córdoba	4 – 1	Almería	Córdoba
12:00	Xisco 22' (yellow card) 22'; Carlos Caballero (yellow card) 34'; López Garai 39' (yellow card) 43' (goal) 57'; Fuentes (yellow card) 41'; Armando (yellow card) 42'; Rennella 48' (yellow card) 72'	Report	36' Pellerano; (yellow card) 42' (red card) 44' Soriano	Stadium: Nuevo Arcángel; Attendance: 9,353; Referee: López Acera

23 March 2013 Round 31	Almería	0 – 1	Sporting Gijón	Almería
17:02	Gunino (yellow card) 14'; Pellerano (yellow card) 19'; Charles (yellow card) 86'	Report	(yellow card) 10' (red card) 63' Lora; 31' (yellow card) 42' Santi Jara; (yellow card) 35' Bustos; (yellow card) 65' Juan Pablo; (yellow card) 67' Luis; (yellow card) 70' Gregory	Stadium: Juegos Mediterráneos; Attendance: 9,500; Referee: Juan Martínez Munuera

31 March 2013 Round 32	Huesca	1 – 2	Almería	Huesca
12:00	Camacho (yellow card) 29'; David López (yellow card) 31'; Pacheco 71'	Report	30' Aleix Vidal; (yellow card) 42' (goal) 58' Christian; (yellow card) 89' Pallardó	Stadium: El Alcoraz; Attendance: 3,100; Referee: Medie Jiménez

7 April 2013 Round 33	Almería	2 – 1	Recreativo	Almería
19:00	Charles 43'; Verza (yellow card) 44'; Rafita (yellow card) 47'; Corona (yellow card) 53'; Aleix Vidal 70'; Pallardó (yellow card) 83'	Report	(yellow card) 4' Cifu; (yellow card) 16' Berrocal; (red card) 27' Dimas; (yellow card) 44' Jonatan; (yellow card) 53' Montoro; 79' Ruymán; (yellow card) 83' Morcillo; (yellow card) 88' Matamala	Stadium: Juegos Mediterráneos; Attendance: 10,000; Referee: Ricardo de Burgos Bengoetxea

13 April 2013 Round 34	Mirandés	1 – 0	Almería	Miranda de Ebro
18:00	Martínez (yellow card) 16'; Díaz de Cerio 27'; César Caneda (yellow card) 40'; Koikili (yellow card) 78'; Iván Agustín (yellow card) 86'	Report	(yellow card) 10' Pallardó; (yellow card) 35' Verza; (yellow card) 46' Rafita	Stadium: Anduva; Attendance: 4,673; Referee: Jaime Latre

21 April 2013 Round 35	Almería	1 – 1	Numancia	Almería
17:00	Soriano 11'; Rubén (yellow card) 87'	Report	2' Juanma; (yellow card) 72' Isidoro; (yellow card) 74' Antonio Tomás; (yellow card) 88' Biel Ribas	Stadium: Juegos Mediterráneos; Attendance: 8,112; Referee: Ocón Arráiz

28 April 2013 Round 36	Murcia	1 – 0	Almería	Murcia
17:02	Dos Santos (yellow card) 32'; Kike 43'; Acciari (yellow card) 51'; Tagliafico (yellow card) 55'; Óscar Sánchez (yellow card) 59'	Report	(yellow card) 86' Soriano; (yellow card) 89' Rafita	Stadium: Nueva Condomina; Attendance: 7,000; Referee: Juan Martínez Munuera

5 May 2013 Round 37	Almería	2 – 1	Racing	Almería
19:00	Verza (yellow card) 28'; Charles 36' 80'	Report	28' (yellow card) 36' (red card) 56' Jairo; (yellow card) 32' Koné; (yellow card) 36' Martí; (yellow card) 36' Gai; (yellow card) 83' Francis	Stadium: Juegos Mediterráneos; Attendance: 7,833; Referee: Valdés Aller

12 May 2013 Round 38	Lugo	3 – 5	Almería	Lugo
18:00	Pita (yellow card) 1'; Iago Díaz (yellow card) 11' (goal) 30'; Tena (yellow card) 32'; Manu 74'; Iván Pérez 86'	Report	(yellow card) 26' Trujillo; 44' Christian; 49' Iago; (yellow card) 60' (goal) 90+2' Aleix Vidal; (yellow card) 63' Corona; 65' Charles; (yellow card) 80' Pallardó; 83' Calvo	Stadium: Anxo Carro; Attendance: 4,000; Referee: Arcediano Monescillo

19 May 2013 Round 39	Almería	2 – 1	Elche	Almería
12:00	Christian 9' (yellow card) 57'; Soriano 40' (yellow card) 75'	Report	31' Coro; (yellow card) 38' Xabier Etxeita; (yellow card) 63' Javier Flaño; (yellow card) 67' Pelegrín; (yellow card) 87' Albácar	Stadium: Juegos Mediterráneos; Attendance: 13,000; Referee: López Acera

25 May 2013 Round 40	Alcorcón	0 – 3	Almería	Alcorcón
16:00	Nagore (yellow card) 12'; Miguélez (yellow card) 29'; Juli (yellow card) 55'; Babin (yellow card) 80'; Laguardia (yellow card) 85'	Report	11' 78' Charles; (yellow card) 66' Gunino; 69' Soriano	Stadium: Santo Domingo; Attendance: 3,000; Referee: Prieto Iglesias

2 June 2013 Round 41	Almería	2 – 1	Girona	Almería
18:00	Charles 1' 88'; Verza (yellow card) 5'; Jonathan (yellow card) 88'; Rubén (yellow card) 90+4'	Report	(yellow card) 21' Luso; 25' Javi Acuña; (yellow card) 78' Moisés Hurtado	Stadium: Juegos Mediterráneos; Attendance: 12,927; Referee: Ocón Arráiz

9 June 2013 Round 42	Villarreal	1 – 0	Almería	Villarreal
19:00	Canteros (yellow card) 34'; Pereira 55'; Perbet (yellow card) 65'; Cani (yellow card) 87'; Oriol (yellow card) 87'	Report	(yellow card) 76' Corona; (yellow card) 87' Rubén; (yellow card) 87' Pellerano	Stadium: El Madrigal; Attendance: 25,000; Referee: Bikandi Garrido

==== Promotion play-offs ====
===== Semifinals =====
12 June 2013
21:00 WEST
First leg

Las Palmas	1 – 1	Almería
Thievy 85'	Report; Live TV: Canal+ 1	A. Vidal 6'

Gran Canaria, Las Palmas de Gran Canaria
Attendance: 16,564
Referee: Eduardo Prieto Iglesias (Navarre)

LAS PALMAS:
GK	1	(Argentina) Barbosa
DF	2	(France) Pignol	(yellow card) 37'
DF	5	(Spain) David García
DF	15	(Spain) Deivid
DF	3	(Cameroon) Atouba		(substituted off) 71'
MF	14	(Spain) Nauzet Alemán
MF	4	(Spain) Vicente Gómez	(yellow card) 14'
MF	20	(Spain) Momo		(substituted off) 46'
MF	7	(Spain) Vitolo
FW	16	(France) Thievy
FW	8	(Spain) Tato		(substituted off) 46'
Substitutions:
GK	13	(Spain) Raúl Lizoain
DF	22	(Spain) Corrales		(substituted on) 71'
DF	24	(Colombia) Jeison Murillo
MF	18	(Spain) Javi Castellano
MF	28	(Spain) Hernán		(substituted on) 46'
FW	9	(Nigeria) Macauley Chrisantus
FW	19	(Spain) Javi Guerrero	(yellow card) 88'	(substituted on) 46'
Manager:
(Spain) Sergio Lobera

ALMERÍA:
GK	1	(Spain) Esteban
DF	21	(Uruguay) Adrián Gunino
DF	4	(Argentina) Hernán Pellerano	(yellow card) 77'
DF	5	(Spain) Trujillo
DF	18	(Spain) Christian Fernández
MF	7	(Spain) Verza
MF	15	(Spain) Corona		(substituted off) 83'
MF	8	(Spain) Aleix Vidal
MF	6	(Spain) Fernando Soriano
MF	14	(Spain) Iago Falqué		(substituted off) 75'
FW	9	(Brazil) Charles		(substituted off) 49'
Substitutions:
GK	25	(Spain) Diego García
DF	17	(Spain) Álvaro Mejía		(substituted on) 83'
DF	20	(Spain) Rafita
MF	19	(Spain) Carlos Calvo		(substituted on) 75'
MF	22	(Spain) Pallardó
FW	32	(Spain) Chumbi
FW	33	(Burkina Faso) Jonathan		(substituted on) 49'
Manager:
(Spain) Javi Gracia

Assistant referees:
Francisco Javier García Sabuco (Navarre)
Iñigo Prieto López de Ceraín (Navarre)
Fourth official:
David Jesús Pinto Herrera (Tenerife)

16 June 2013
19:00 CEST
Second leg

Almería	2 – 1	Las Palmas
Charles 60' 120+2'	Report; Live TV: Canal+ 1	86' Chrisantus

Juegos Mediterráneos, Almería
Referee: Fernando López Acera (Extremadura)

ALMERÍA:
GK	1	(Spain) Esteban
DF	21	(Uruguay) Adrián Gunino	(yellow card) 118'
DF	4	(Argentina) Hernán Pellerano
DF	5	(Spain) Trujillo
DF	18	(Spain) Christian Fernández
MF	7	(Spain) Verza	(yellow card) 99'
MF	15	(Spain) Corona		(substituted off) 83'
MF	8	(Spain) Aleix Vidal		(substituted off) 89'
MF	6	(Spain) Fernando Soriano	(yellow card) 31'
MF	14	(Spain) Iago Falqué		(substituted off) 74'
FW	9	(Brazil) Charles	(yellow card) 120+3'
Substitutions:
GK	25	(Spain) Diego García
DF	17	(Spain) Álvaro Mejía	(yellow card) 104'	(substituted on) 83'
DF	20	(Spain) Rafita
MF	10	(Spain) Rubén Suárez
MF	19	(Spain) Carlos Calvo	(yellow card) 108'	(substituted on) 89'
MF	22	(Spain) Pallardó
FW	33	(Burkina Faso) Jonathan		(substituted on) 74'
Manager:
(Spain) Javi Gracia

LAS PALMAS:
GK	1	(Argentina) Barbosa
DF	5	(Spain) David García	(yellow card) 57'
DF	15	(Spain) Deivid
DF	24	(Colombia) Jeison Murillo	(yellow card) 66'
DF	3	(Cameroon) Atouba
MF	4	(Spain) Vicente Gómez		(substituted off) 80'
MF	18	(Spain) Javi Castellano	(yellow card) 55' (red card) 116'
MF	14	(Spain) Nauzet Alemán		(substituted off) 76'
MF	7	(Spain) Vitolo
FW	19	(Spain) Javi Guerrero
FW	16	(France) Thievy
Substitutions:
GK	13	(Spain) Raúl Lizoain
DF	2	(France) Stéphane Pignol
DF	22	(Spain) Corrales
MF	18	(Spain) Momo		(substituted on) 80'
FW	8	(Spain) Tato		(substituted on) 76'
FW	9	(Nigeria) Chrisantus	(red card) 113'	(substituted on) 64'
FW	21	(Peru) Andy Pando
Manager:
(Spain) Sergio Lobera

Assistant referees:
Juan Manuel Sánchez Fernández (Extremadura)
Alberto Romera Durán (Extremadura)
Fourth official:
Francisco Javier Hernández Maeso (Extremadura)

===== Finals =====
====== First leg ======
19 June 2013
20:00 CEST

Girona	0 – 1	Almería
	Report; Live TV: Canal+ 1	Charles 49'

Montilivi
Referee: Francisco Manuel Arias López (Cantabria)

GIRONA:
GK	13	(Spain) Isaac Becerra
DF	2	(Spain) José		(substituted off) 69'
DF	7	(Spain) Richy
DF	5	(Spain) Chus Herrero	(yellow card) 66'
DF	3	(Spain) David García
MF	6	(Spain) Marcos Tébar
MF	23	(Spain) Luso
MF	17	(Spain) Juanlu
MF	19	(Spain) Felipe Sanchón		(substituted off) 84'
MF	24	(Spain) Jofre		(substituted off) 58'
FW	9	(Spain) Gerard Bordas
Substitutions:
GK	1	(Spain) Dani Mallo
DF	4	(Spain) Txiki
DF	26	(Spain) David Juncà
MF	11	(Spain) Eloi		(substituted on) 69'
MF	16	(Spain) Moisés Hurtado
FW	15	(Paraguay) Javi Acuña		(substituted on) 58'
FW	10	(Spain) Ion Vélez	(yellow card) 28'	(substituted on) 84'
Manager:
(Spain) Joan Francesc Ferrer "Rubi"

ALMERÍA:
GK	1	(Spain) Esteban	(yellow card) 90+2'
DF	21	(Uruguay) Adrián Gunino	(yellow card) 74'
DF	4	(Argentina) Hernán Pellerano
DF	5	(Spain) Trujillo
DF	18	(Spain) Christian Fernández	(yellow card) 56'
MF	7	(Spain) Verza
MF	15	(Spain) Corona	(yellow card) 38'	(substituted off) 62'
MF	8	(Spain) Aleix Vidal
MF	6	(Spain) Fernando Soriano	(yellow card) 68'	(substituted off) 69'
MF	14	(Spain) Iago Falqué	(yellow card) 12'
FW	9	(Brazil) Charles		(substituted off) 80'
Substitutions:
GK	25	(Spain) Diego García
DF	17	(Spain) Álvaro Mejía		(substituted on) 62'
DF	20	(Spain) Rafita
MF	10	(Spain) Rubén Suárez
MF	19	(Spain) Carlos Calvo		(substituted on) 69'
MF	22	(Spain) Pallardó
FW	33	(Burkina Faso) Jonathan		(substituted on) 80'
Manager:
(Spain) Javi Gracia

Assistant referees:
César de Juana González (Cantabria)
Mateo Nicolás Vaquero Agama (Extremadura)
Fourth official:
Adrián Cordero Vega (Cantabria)

====== Second leg ======
22 June 2013
20:00 CEST

Almería	3 – 0	Girona
Vidal 17'; Charles 53', 71'	Report; Live TV: Canal+ 1

Juegos Mediterráneos
Referee: Santiago Jaime Latre (Aragon)

ALMERÍA:
GK	1	(Spain) Esteban Suárez
DF	21	(Uruguay) Adrián Gunino
DF	4	(Argentina) Hernán Pellerano
DF	5	(Spain) Ángel Trujillo
DF	18	(Spain) Christian Fernández	(yellow card) 66'
MF	7	(Spain) Verza
MF	15	(Spain) Corona		(substituted off) 83'
MF	8	(Spain) Aleix Vidal
MF	14	(Spain) Iago Falqué		(substituted off) 75'
FW	6	(Spain) Fernando Soriano	(yellow card) 40'	(substituted off) 79'
FW	9	(Brazil) Charles	(yellow card) 45+1'
Substitutions:
GK	25	(Spain) Diego García
DF	20	(Spain) Rafita
DF	17	(Spain) Álvaro Mejía		(substituted on) 79'
MF	10	(Spain) Rubén Suárez	(yellow card) 84'	(substituted on) 83'
MF	19	(Spain) Carlos Calvo		(substituted on) 75'
MF	22	(Spain) Miguel Pallardó
FW	33	(Burkina Faso) Jonathan Zongo
Manager:
(Spain) Javi Gracia

GIRONA:
GK	13	(Spain) Isaac Becerra
DF	2	(Spain) José		(substituted off) 46'
DF	16	(Spain) Moisés Hurtado
DF	5	(Spain) Chus Herrero	(yellow card) 53'
DF	3	(Spain) David García		(substituted off) 76'
MF	6	(Spain) Marcos Tébar
MF	23	(Spain) Luso
MF	17	(Spain) Felipe Sanchón
MF	11	(Spain) Eloi
MF	14	(Spain) Toni Moral		(substituted off) 46'
FW	15	(Paraguay) Javi Acuña	(yellow card) 37'
Substitutions:
GK	1	(Spain) Dani Mallo
DF	7	(Spain) Richy
DF	26	(Spain) David Juncà		(substituted on) 76'
MF	17	(Spain) Juanlu		(substituted on) 46'
MF	20	(Spain) Jandro		(substituted on) 46'
FW	9	(Spain) Gerard Bordas
FW	10	(Spain) Ion Vélez
Manager:
(Spain) Joan Francesc Ferrer "Rubi"

Assistant referees:
Jorge Bueno Mateo (Aragon)
José Antonio Garrido Romero (Community of Madrid)
Fourth official:
Andrés Manuel Ceballos Silva (Extremadura)

==== Copa del Rey ====
11 September 2012 Round 2	Almería	2 – 0	Murcia	Almería
21:30	Charles (yellow card) 31'; Soriano (yellow card) 74'; Ulloa 77'; Aarón 84'	Report	(yellow card) 64' (red card) 87' Acciari; (yellow card) 82' Matilla	Stadium: Juegos del Mediterráneo; Referee: Lesma López

16 October 2012 Round 3	Almería	3 – 0	Alcorcón	Almería
	Aleix Vidal 23'; Ulloa 41'; Abel 62'; Gunino (yellow card) 63'	Report	(yellow card) 21' Kike López; (yellow card) 60' Laguardia; (yellow card) 89' Oriol Riera	Stadium: Juegos del Mediterráneo; Referee: Jaime Latre

31 October 2012 Round of 32	Almería	2 – 0	Celta	Almería
	Jonathan 53'; Abel 86'	Report	(red card) 61' Jonathan Vila; (yellow card) 79' Joan Tomás	Stadium: Juegos del Mediterráneo; Attendance: Hernández Hernández

28 November 2012 Round of 32	Celta	3 – 0	Almería	Vigo
19:30	Park Chu-Young 54'; Roberto Lago 89'; Toni (yellow card) 106'; De Lucas 109'	Report	(yellow card) 70' Javi Casquero; (yellow card) 77' Verza; (yellow card) 88' Jonathan; (red card) 116' Aarón	Stadium: Balaídos; Referee: Undiano Mallenco
