= 2013 Segunda División play-offs =

Segunda División play-offs
- Season: 2012–13
- Promoted: Almería
- Matches: 6
- Goals: 15 (2.5 per match)

The 2013 Segunda División play-offs took place in June 2013. The Segunda División promotion phase (known as Promoción de ascenso) was the second phase of 2012–13 Segunda División and was to determine the third team which promoted to 2013–14 La Liga. Teams placed between third and sixth position (excluding reserve teams) took part in the promotion play-offs.

Regulations were the same that previous season: the fifth placed faced the fourth, while the sixth positioned team faced the third. In case of an eliminatory competition tie, extra time would be played but there would not be a penalty shoot-out; the winner would be the best positioned team. The first leg of the semi-finals were played on 12 June, and the second leg on 15 June at home of the best positioned team. The final was also two-legged, with the first leg on 19 June and the second leg on 22 June, with the best positioned team also playing at home the second leg. Almería and Girona played the final phase where Almería was winner and promoted to La Liga after two years of absence. Alcorcón and Las Palmas were eliminated in semi-finals.

== Road to the play-offs ==
=== League table ===
Pos	Team	Pld	W	D	L	GF	GA	GD	Pts	Qualification
3	Almería	42	22	8	12	72	50	+22	74	Promotion play-offs
4	Girona	42	21	8	13	74	56	+18	71	Promotion play-offs
5	Alcorcón	42	21	6	15	57	55	+2	69	Promotion play-offs
6	Las Palmas	42	18	12	12	62	55	+7	66	Promotion play-offs

Source: LFP - Liga Adelante
Rules for classification: 1st points; 2nd head-to-head points; 3rd head-to-head goal difference; 4th head-to-head goals scored; 5th goal difference; 6th number of goals scored; 7th Fair-play points

=== Almería ===
Almería qualified for this phase on the last matchday after failing to secure promotion to La Liga directly after they lost 1–0 at El Madrigal in the decisive last match was against the already promoted Villarreal.

Almería's last participation in La Liga was in 2010–11. The club had spent four seasons in a row in the top division, where they debuted in 2006–07. This was the second season in the second division since their relegation in 2011.

Background at 2012–13 Segunda División:

Round	1	2	3	4	5	6	7	8	9	10	11	12	13	14	15	16	17	18	19	20	21	22	23	24	25	26	27	28	29	30	31	32	33	34	35	36	37	38	39	40	41	42
Home/Away	H	H	A	H	A	H	A	H	A	A	H	A	H	A	H	A	H	A	H	A	H	H	A	A	H	A	H	A	H	H	A	H	A	H	A	H	A	H	A	A	H	A
Result	W	W	L	W	D	D	W	W	L	W	W	W	D	D	W	W	L	L	L	W	D	D	W	L	W	D	W	W	L	L	W	W	L	D	L	W	W	W	W	L	W	L
Position	4	2	2	3	3	3	4	2	2	2	2	2	3	3	2	2	2	3	4	4	3	2	2	2	2	2	2	2	2	3	4	3	2	5	5	5	5	4	3	3	3	3

=== Girona ===
Girona was the only known team to qualify for the play-offs before the last matchday, assuring fourth place in the 41st round. They made a spectacular performance and spent all season in promotion places, some of them in direct promotion.

Girona had never been in La Liga. This was the fifth season in the second division since their return in 2008–09 after 50 years in lower categories.

Background at 2012–13 Segunda División:

Round	1	2	3	4	5	6	7	8	9	10	11	12	13	14	15	16	17	18	19	20	21	22	23	24	25	26	27	28	29	30	31	32	33	34	35	36	37	38	39	40	41	42
Home/Away	A	H	A	H	A	H	A	H	A	H	H	A	H	A	H	A	A	H	A	H	A	A	H	A	H	A	H	A	H	H	A	H	A	H	A	H	H	A	H	A	A	H
Result	W	W	L	W	L	W	D	W	D	D	W	W	W	W	L	L	W	W	D	L	D	L	W	L	D	L	W	L	W	W	L	W	W	W	D	W	L	L	W	W	L	D
Position	11	3	3	4	4	6	5	4	4	5	4	3	2	2	3	4	3	2	2	3	2	3	3	3	4	4	3	4	4	4	3	5	4	2	2	3	2	2	4	4	4	4

=== Alcorcón ===
Alcorcón was one of the teams which they spent almost all season in promotion places, most of them in the play-offs zone, but they qualified for this phase in the last matchday. They were fighting together with Las Palmas and Ponferradina for the remaining two places (fifth and sixth) for play-offs, and eventually repeated the play-off appearance from the previous season.

Alcorcón had never been in La Liga. This was the third season in the second division since their debut in 2010–11.

Background at 2012–13 Segunda División:

Round	1	2	3	4	5	6	7	8	9	10	11	12	13	14	15	16	17	18	19	20	21	22	23	24	25	26	27	28	29	30	31	32	33	34	35	36	37	38	39	40	41	42
Home/Away	A	H	A	H	A	H	A	H	A	H	H	A	H	A	A	H	A	H	A	H	A	A	H	A	H	A	H	A	H	H	A	H	A	H	H	A	H	A	H	A	A	H
Result	L	W	W	W	L	W	L	W	W	D	W	L	W	L	W	W	L	D	W	W	L	L	W	L	W	D	L	W	W	D	D	L	W	W	W	L	L	D	L	W	L	W
Position	9	16	11	6	5	7	7	9	6	4	3	4	4	5	4	3	4	4	3	2	4	4	4	4	3	3	4	3	3	2	2	2	5	3	3	2	3	5	5	5	5	5

=== Las Palmas ===
Las Palmas made a regular season and was in play-offs zone in the last part of the season.

Las Palmas last participation in La Liga was in 2001–02. Las Palmas spent 31 seasons in the top division: the first in 1951–52, and from 1954–88 except periods 1960–64 and 1983–85, and lately from 2000–02. It ranked 19th in the all-time La Liga table. They were in the category since 2006–07.

Background at 2012–13 Segunda División:

Round	1	2	3	4	5	6	7	8	9	10	11	12	13	14	15	16	17	18	19	20	21	22	23	24	25	26	27	28	29	30	31	32	33	34	35	36	37	38	39	40	41	42
Home/Away	H	A	H	A	H	A	H	A	H	A	A	H	A	H	H	A	H	A	H	A	H	H	A	H	A	H	A	H	A	A	H	A	H	A	A	H	A	H	A	H	H	A
Result	D	L	L	L	D	D	L	L	W	W	W	W	W	D	W	D	W	D	W	L	W	W	L	D	L	W	D	D	W	W	L	W	D	W	L	W	D	D	L	W	W	L
Position	6	8	10	16	18	19	18	19	20	19	17	15	12	12	8	8	7	9	7	8	6	6	7	7	8	7	9	8	7	6	6	6	6	6	6	6	6	6	6	7	6	6

== Promotion play-offs ==
Semi-finals
5	Alcorcón	1	1	2
4	Girona	1	3	4
6	Las Palmas	1	1	2
3	Almería (aet)	1	2	3

Final
4	Girona	0	0	0
3	Almería	1	3	4

=== Semifinals ===
Team 1	Agg.	Team 2	1st leg	2nd leg
Alcorcón	2–4	Girona	1–1	1–3
Las Palmas	2–3	Almería	1–1	1–2 (aet)

==== First leg ====
12 June 2013
20:00 CEST

Alcorcón	1–1	Girona
Miguélez 63'	Report; Live TV: Marca TV / Esport3	Hurtado 10'

Santo Domingo, Alcorcón
Attendance: 5,000
Referee: José María Sánchez Martínez (Region of Murcia)

ALCORCÓN:
GK	1	(Spain) Manu
DF	24	(Spain) Nagore
DF	6	(France) Jean-Sylvain Babin	(yellow card) 70'
DF	8	(Spain) Rubén Sanz
DF	3	(France) Samuel Camille
MF	10	(Spain) Sergio Mora	(yellow card) 57'
MF	4	(Spain) Abraham González
MF	20	(Spain) Fernando Sales	(yellow card) 88'
MF	11	(Spain) Kike		(substituted off) 39'
FW	15	(Spain) Juli		(substituted off) 83'
FW	9	(Spain) Oriol Riera	(yellow card) 75'	(substituted off) 87'
Substitutions:
GK	13	(Spain) Francisco Dorronsoro
DF	16	(Spain) Víctor Laguardia
DF	23	(Spain) Ángel
MF	19	(Spain) Fernando Morán
MF	7	(Spain) Dani Nieto		(substituted on) 83'
FW	18	(Spain) David Miguélez		(substituted on) 39'
FW	14	(Spain) Urko Vera		(substituted on) 87'
Manager:
(Spain) José Bordalás

GIRONA:
GK	13	(Spain) Isaac Becerra	(yellow card) 79'
DF	2	(Spain) José
DF	16	(Spain) Moisés Hurtado
DF	5	(Spain) Chus Herrero
DF	3	(Spain) David García		(substituted off) 83'
MF	6	(Spain) Marcos Tébar	(yellow card) 89'
MF	23	(Spain) Luso
MF	17	(Spain) Juanlu
MF	14	(Spain) Toni Moral		(substituted off) 38'
FW	19	(Spain) Felipe Sanchón		(substituted off) 70'
FW	9	(Spain) Gerard Bordas
Substitutions:
GK	1	(Spain) Dani Mallo
DF	7	(Spain) Richy
DF	4	(Spain) Txiki	(yellow card) 87'	(substituted on) 83'
MF	11	(Spain) Eloi
MF	20	(Spain) Jandro
MF	24	(Spain) Jofre		(substituted on) 38'
FW	10	(Spain) Ion Vélez		(substituted on) 70'
Manager:
(Spain) Joan Francesc Ferrer "Rubi"

Assistant referees:
Javier Martínez Nicolás (Region of Murcia)
Juan José López Mir (Region of Murcia)
Fourth official:
Alfonso Melgares de Aguilar Fernández (Region of Murcia)

12 June 2013
21:00 WEST

Las Palmas	1–1	Almería
Bifouma 85'	Report; Live TV: Canal+ 1	Vidal 6'

Gran Canaria, Las Palmas de Gran Canaria
Attendance: 16,564
Referee: Eduardo Prieto Iglesias (Navarre)

LAS PALMAS:
GK	1	(Argentina) Mariano Barbosa
DF	2	(France) Stéphane Pignol	(yellow card) 37'
DF	5	(Spain) David García
DF	15	(Spain) Deivid
DF	3	(Cameroon) Timothée Atouba		(substituted off) 71'
MF	14	(Spain) Nauzet Alemán
MF	4	(Spain) Vicente Gómez	(yellow card) 15'
MF	20	(Spain) Momo		(substituted off) 46'
MF	7	(Spain) Vitolo
FW	16	(France) Thievy Bifouma
FW	8	(Spain) Jesús Tato		(substituted off) 46'
Substitutions:
GK	13	(Spain) Raúl Lizoain
DF	24	(Colombia) Jeison Murillo
DF	22	(Spain) Enrique Corrales		(substituted on) 71'
MF	18	(Spain) Javi Castellano
MF	28	(Spain) Hernán		(substituted on) 46'
FW	9	(Nigeria) Macauley Chrisantus
FW	19	(Spain) Javi Guerrero	(yellow card) 88'	(substituted on) 46'
Manager:
(Spain) Sergio Lobera

ALMERÍA:
GK	1	(Spain) Esteban
DF	21	(Uruguay) Adrián Gunino
DF	4	(Argentina) Hernán Pellerano	(yellow card) 77'
DF	5	(Spain) Ángel Trujillo
DF	18	(Spain) Christian
MF	7	(Spain) Verza
MF	15	(Spain) Corona	(yellow card) 61'	(substituted off) 83'
MF	8	(Spain) Aleix Vidal
MF	14	(Spain) Iago Falque		(substituted off) 75'
FW	6	(Spain) Fernando Soriano
FW	9	(Brazil) Charles		(substituted off) 49'
Substitutions:
GK	25	(Spain) Diego
DF	20	(Spain) Rafita
DF	17	(Spain) Álvaro Mejía		(substituted on) 83'
MF	22	(Spain) Miguel Pallardó
MF	19	(Spain) Carlos Calvo		(substituted on) 75'
FW	32	(Spain) Chumbi
FW	33	(Burkina Faso) Jonathan Zongo		(substituted on) 49'
Manager:
(Spain) Javi Gracia

Assistant referees:
Francisco Javier García Sabuco (Navarre)
Iñigo Prieto López de Ceraín (Navarre)
Fourth official:
David Jesús Pinto Herrera (Tenerife)

==== Second leg ====
16 June 2013
19:00 CEST

Almería	2–1 (a.e.t.) (3–2 agg.)	Las Palmas
Soriano 60'; Charles 120+1'	Report; Live TV: Canal+ 1	Chrisantus 86'

Juegos Mediterráneos, Almería
Attendance: 11,065
Referee: Fernando López Acera (Extremadura)

ALMERÍA:
GK	1	(Spain) Esteban
DF	21	(Uruguay) Adrián Gunino	(yellow card) 119'
DF	4	(Argentina) Hernán Pellerano
DF	5	(Spain) Ángel Trujillo
DF	18	(Spain) Christian
MF	7	(Spain) Verza	(yellow card) 100'
MF	15	(Spain) Corona		(substituted off) 83'
MF	8	(Spain) Aleix Vidal		(substituted off) 90'
MF	14	(Spain) Iago Falque		(substituted off) 75'
FW	6	(Spain) Fernando Soriano	(yellow card) 30'
FW	9	(Brazil) Charles	(yellow card) 120+1'
Substitutions:
GK	25	(Spain) Diego
DF	20	(Spain) Rafita
DF	17	(Spain) Álvaro Mejía	(yellow card) 104'	(substituted on) 83'
MF	22	(Spain) Miguel Pallardó
MF	19	(Spain) Carlos Calvo	(yellow card) 108'	(substituted on) 90'
FW	32	(Spain) Chumbi
FW	33	(Burkina Faso) Jonathan Zongo		(substituted on) 73'
Manager:
(Spain) Javi Gracia

LAS PALMAS:
GK	1	(Argentina) Mariano Barbosa
DF	5	(Spain) David García	(yellow card) 58'
DF	15	(Spain) Deivid
DF	24	(Colombia) Jeison Murillo	(yellow card) 67'
DF	3	(Cameroon) Timothée Atouba
MF	4	(Spain) Vicente Gómez		(substituted off) 81'
MF	18	(Spain) Javi Castellano	(yellow card) 56' (yellow-red card) 117'
MF	14	(Spain) Nauzet		(substituted off) 77'
MF	7	(Spain) Vitolo
FW	19	(Spain) Javi Guerrero		(substituted off) 65'
FW	16	(France) Thievy Bifouma
Substitutions:
GK	13	(Spain) Raúl Lizoain
DF	2	(France) Stéphane Pignol
DF	22	(Spain) Enrique Corrales
MF	20	(Spain) Momo		(substituted on) 81'
FW	8	(Spain) Jesús Tato		(substituted on) 77'
FW	9	(Nigeria) Macauley Chrisantus	(red card) 115'	(substituted on) 65'
FW	21	(Peru) Andy Pando
Manager:
(Spain) Sergio Lobera

Assistant referees:
Juan Manuel Sánchez Fernández (Extremadura)
Alberto Romera Durán (Extremadura)
Fourth official:
Francisco Javier Hernández Maeso (Extremadura)

16 June 2013
21:00 CEST

Girona	3–1 (4–2 agg.)	Alcorcón
Acuña 5'; Juanlu 37', 80'	Report; Live TV: Marca TV / Esport3	Mora 86'

Montilivi, Girona
Attendance: 9,286
Referee: Juan Martínez Munuera (Valencian Community)

GIRONA:
GK	13	(Spain) Isaac Becerra
DF	2	(Spain) José
DF	16	(Spain) Moisés Hurtado		(substituted off) 46'
DF	5	(Spain) Chus Herrero
DF	3	(Spain) David García
MF	6	(Spain) Marcos Tébar
MF	23	(Spain) Luso
MF	17	(Spain) Juanlu
MF	19	(Spain) Felipe Sanchón
FW	20	(Spain) Jandro		(substituted off) 74'
FW	15	(Spain) Javier Acuña		(substituted off) 12'
Substitutions:
GK	1	(Spain) Dani Mallo
DF	7	(Spain) Richy		(substituted on) 46'
DF	4	(Spain) Txiki
MF	11	(Spain) Eloi		(substituted on) 74'
MF	24	(Spain) Jofre
FW	10	(Spain) Ion Vélez	(yellow card) 28'	(substituted on) 12'
MF	14	(Spain) Toni Moral
FW	9	(Spain) Gerard Bordas
Manager:
(Spain) Joan Francesc Ferrer "Rubi"

ALCORCÓN:
GK	1	(Spain) Manu
DF	24	(Spain) Nagore
DF	6	(France) Jean-Sylvain Babin
DF	8	(Spain) Rubén Sanz	(yellow card) 72'
DF	3	(France) Samuel Camille	(yellow card) 35'
MF	10	(Spain) Sergio Mora
MF	4	(Spain) Abraham González
MF	20	(Spain) Fernando Sales	(yellow card) 65'	(substituted off) 73'
MF	11	(Spain) Kike	(yellow card) 45+1'	(substituted off) 46'
FW	15	(Spain) Juli
FW	9	(Spain) Oriol Riera		(substituted off) 69'
Substitutions:
GK	13	(Spain) Francisco Dorronsoro
DF	16	(Spain) Víctor Laguardia
DF	23	(Spain) Ángel
MF	22	(Spain) Sergi Enrich		(substituted on) 73'
MF	7	(Spain) Dani Nieto		(substituted on) 46'
FW	18	(Spain) David Miguélez
FW	14	(Spain) Urko Vera		(substituted on) 69'
Manager:
(Spain) José Bordalás

Assistant referees:
David Canales Cerdà (Valencian Community)
Sergio Chinchilla Ortega (Valencian Community)
Fourth official:
Miguel Bosch Domènech (Valencian Community)

=== Final ===
Team 1	Agg.	Team 2	1st leg	2nd leg
Girona	0–4	Almería	0–1	0–3

==== First leg ====
19 June 2013
20:00 CEST

Girona	0–1	Almería
	Report; Live TV: Canal+ 1	Charles 49'

Montilivi, Girona
Attendance: 9,286
Referee: Francisco Manuel Arias López (Cantabria)

GIRONA:
GK	13	(Spain) Isaac Becerra
DF	2	(Spain) José		(substituted off) 69'
DF	7	(Spain) Richy
DF	5	(Spain) Chus Herrero	(yellow card) 66'
DF	3	(Spain) David García
MF	6	(Spain) Marcos Tébar
MF	23	(Spain) Luso
MF	17	(Spain) Juanlu
MF	19	(Spain) Felipe Sanchón		(substituted off) 84'
MF	24	(Spain) Jofre		(substituted off) 58'
FW	9	(Spain) Gerard Bordas
Substitutions:
GK	1	(Spain) Dani Mallo
DF	4	(Spain) Txiki
DF	26	(Spain) David Juncà
MF	11	(Spain) Eloi		(substituted on) 69'
MF	16	(Spain) Moisés Hurtado
FW	15	(Paraguay) Javier Acuña		(substituted on) 58'
FW	10	(Spain) Ion Vélez	(yellow card) 28'	(substituted on) 84'
Manager:
(Spain) Joan Francesc Ferrer "Rubi"

ALMERÍA:
GK	1	(Spain) Esteban	(yellow card) 90+2'
DF	21	(Uruguay) Adrián Gunino	(yellow card) 74'
DF	4	(Argentina) Hernán Pellerano
DF	5	(Spain) Ángel Trujillo
DF	18	(Spain) Christian	(yellow card) 56'
MF	7	(Spain) Verza
MF	15	(Spain) Corona	(yellow card) 38'	(substituted off) 62'
MF	8	(Spain) Aleix Vidal
MF	6	(Spain) Fernando Soriano	(yellow card) 68'	(substituted off) 69'
MF	14	(Spain) Iago Falque	(yellow card) 12'
FW	9	(Brazil) Charles		(substituted off) 80'
Substitutions:
GK	25	(Spain) Diego
DF	17	(Spain) Álvaro Mejía		(substituted on) 62'
DF	20	(Spain) Rafita
MF	10	(Spain) Rubén Suárez
MF	19	(Spain) Carlos Calvo		(substituted on) 69'
MF	22	(Spain) Miguel Pallardó
FW	33	(Burkina Faso) Jonathan Zongo		(substituted on) 80'
Manager:
(Spain) Javi Gracia

Assistant referees:
César de Juana González (Cantabria)
Mateo Nicolás Vaquero Agama (Extremadura)
Fourth official:
Adrián Cordero Vega (Cantabria)

==== Second leg ====
22 June 2013
20:00 CEST

Almería	3 – 0 (4 – 0 agg.)	Girona
Vidal 17'; Charles 53', 71'	Report; Live TV: Canal+ 1

Juegos Mediterráneos, Almería
Attendance: 15,123
Referee: Santiago Jaime Latre (Aragon)

ALMERÍA:
GK	1	(Spain) Esteban
DF	21	(Uruguay) Adrián Gunino
DF	4	(Argentina) Hernán Pellerano
DF	5	(Spain) Ángel Trujillo
DF	18	(Spain) Christian	(yellow card) 66'
MF	7	(Spain) Verza
MF	15	(Spain) Corona		(substituted off) 83'
MF	8	(Spain) Aleix Vidal
MF	14	(Spain) Iago Falque		(substituted off) 75'
FW	6	(Spain) Fernando Soriano	(yellow card) 40'	(substituted off) 79'
FW	9	(Brazil) Charles	(yellow card) 45+1'
Substitutions:
GK	25	(Spain) Diego
DF	20	(Spain) Rafita
DF	17	(Spain) Álvaro Mejía		(substituted on) 79'
MF	10	(Spain) Rubén Suárez	(yellow card) 84'	(substituted on) 83'
MF	19	(Spain) Carlos Calvo		(substituted on) 75'
MF	22	(Spain) Miguel Pallardó
FW	33	(Burkina Faso) Jonathan Zongo
Manager:
(Spain) Javi Gracia

GIRONA:
GK	13	(Spain) Isaac Becerra
DF	2	(Spain) José		(substituted off) 46'
DF	16	(Spain) Moisés Hurtado	(yellow card) 84'
DF	5	(Spain) Chus Herrero	(yellow card) 53'
DF	3	(Spain) David García		(substituted off) 76'
MF	6	(Spain) Marcos Tébar
MF	23	(Spain) Luso
MF	17	(Spain) Felipe Sanchón
MF	11	(Spain) Eloi
MF	14	(Spain) Toni Moral		(substituted off) 46'
FW	15	(Paraguay) Javier Acuña	(yellow card) 37'
Substitutions:
GK	1	(Spain) Dani Mallo
DF	7	(Spain) Richy
DF	26	(Spain) David Juncà		(substituted on) 76'
MF	17	(Spain) Juanlu		(substituted on) 46'
MF	20	(Spain) Jandro		(substituted on) 46'
FW	9	(Spain) Gerard Bordas
FW	10	(Spain) Ion Vélez
Manager:
(Spain) Joan Francesc Ferrer "Rubi"

Assistant referees:
Jorge Bueno Mateo (Aragon)
José Antonio Garrido Romero (Community of Madrid)
Fourth official:
Andrés Manuel Ceballos Silva (Extremadura)

Promoted to La Liga
Almería
(2 years later)
