= Marcelo Silva (footballer, born 1989) =

Uruguayan footballer

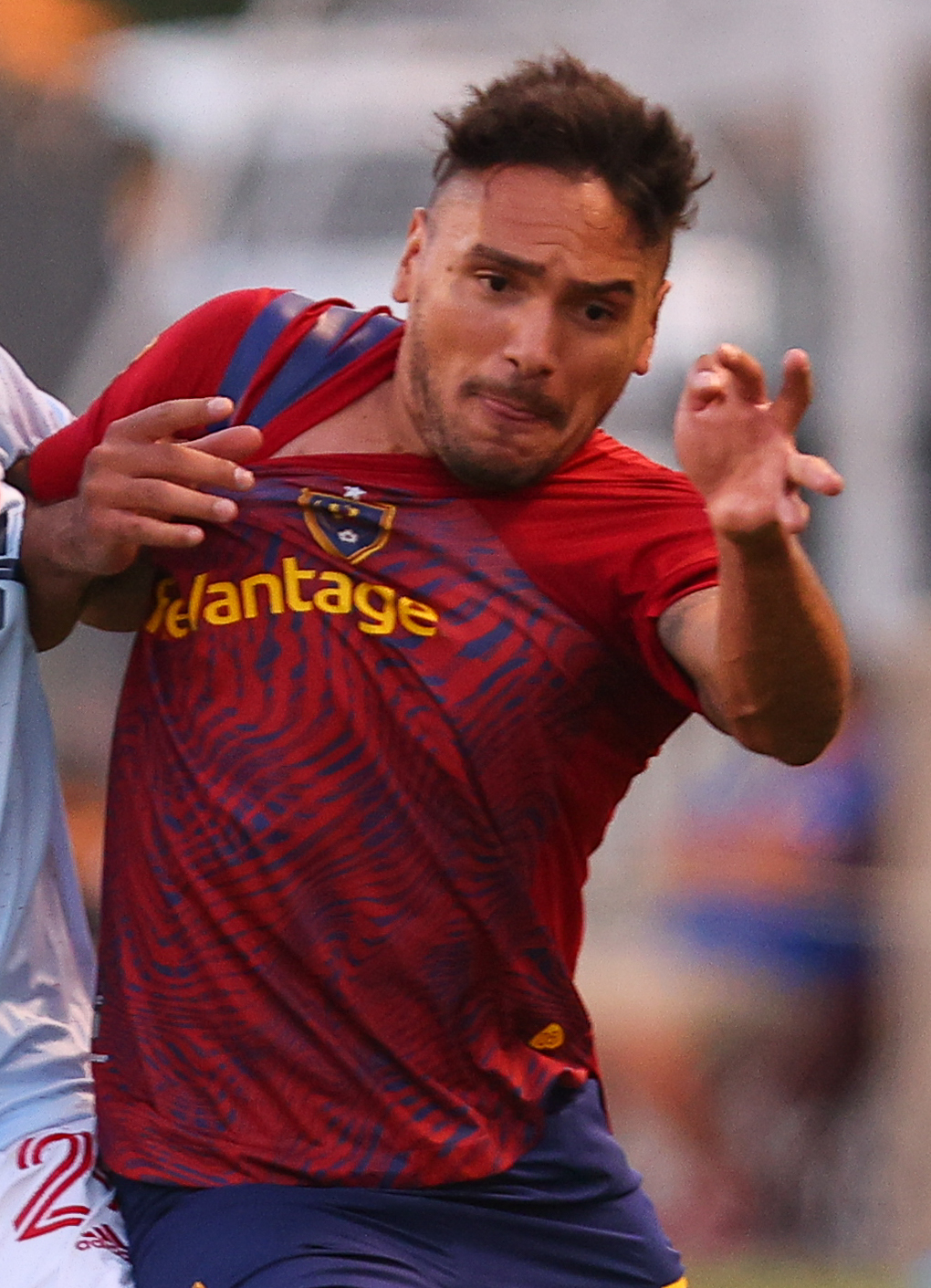
- Silva with Real Salt Lake in 2021

Personal information
- Full name: Marcelo Andrés Silva Fernández
- Date of birth: 21 March 1989 (age 37)
- Place of birth: Mercedes, Uruguay
- Height: 1.85 m (6 ft 1 in)
- Position: Centre back

Youth career
- Danubio

Senior career*
Years	Team	Apps	(Gls)
2009–2010	Danubio	19	(3)
2010–2014	Almería	45	(2)
2012	→ Peñarol (loan)	11	(2)
2014–2015	Las Palmas	23	(1)
2015–2016	Valladolid	31	(1)
2016–2017	Zaragoza	35	(1)
2017–2024	Real Salt Lake	131	(4)
2018	→ Real Monarchs	1	(0)

International career
2009	Uruguay U20	11	(1)
- * Club domestic league appearances and goals as of 19:37, 21 April 2024 (UTC)

Marcelo Andrés Silva Fernández (born 21 March 1989) is a former Uruguayan professional footballer who previously played for Major League Soccer club Real Salt Lake as a central defender.

== Club career ==
Born in Fray Bentos, Silva finished his youth formation in Danubio FC's youth category, making his professional debut on 13 September 2009, against Liverpool F.C. His first career goal came on 5 December, in a 2–0 home win over Central Español.

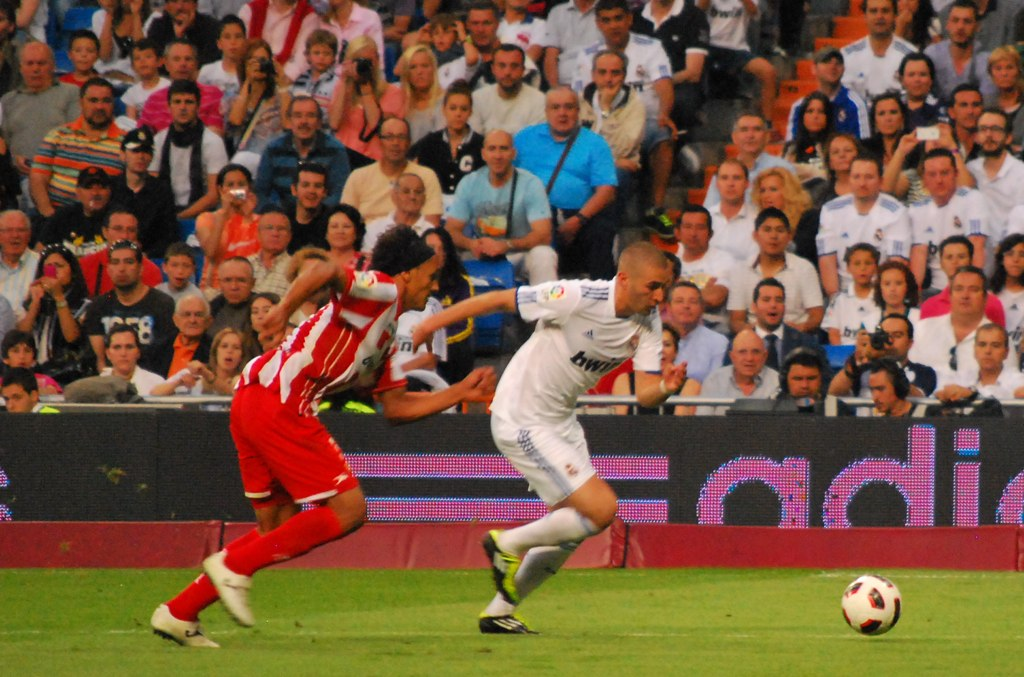
Silva (left) pursuing Karim Benzema, in a match against Real Madrid.

On 24 July 2010, Silva signed a contract with UD Almería, for an undisclosed fee. He made his La Liga debut on 18 September 2010, in a 0–1 away defeat against RCD Espanyol. He scored his first goal abroad on 5 February 2011, in a 3–2 home win against Espanyol.

In February 2012, after failing to retain a starting spot, Silva was loaned to Peñarol. He scored twice in only 11 league appearances for the Uruguayan giants, also appearing in that year's Copa Libertadores.

Silva appeared 23 times in the 2012–13 season (20 in the league, 1679 minutes of action), netting against CE Sabadell FC and being, however, used mostly as a backup to Ángel Trujillo, Álvaro Mejía and Hernán Pellerano, as the Andalusians were promoted in the play-offs. He only appeared in six matches in the following season, only contributing with 114 minutes in the league.

On 1 August 2014 Silva rescinded his link with the rojiblancos, and signed a one-year deal with UD Las Palmas hours later. On 22 July of the following year he moved to Real Valladolid also in the second level.

On 16 July 2016, Silva signed a one-year contract with Real Zaragoza, still in the same division.

On 3 July 2017, Silva signed with Major League Soccer club Real Salt Lake.

== International career ==
Silva was part of the Uruguay U20 in the 2009 FIFA U-20 World Cup and in the 2009 South American Youth Championship.
