= Charles (footballer, born 1984) =

Brazilian footballer

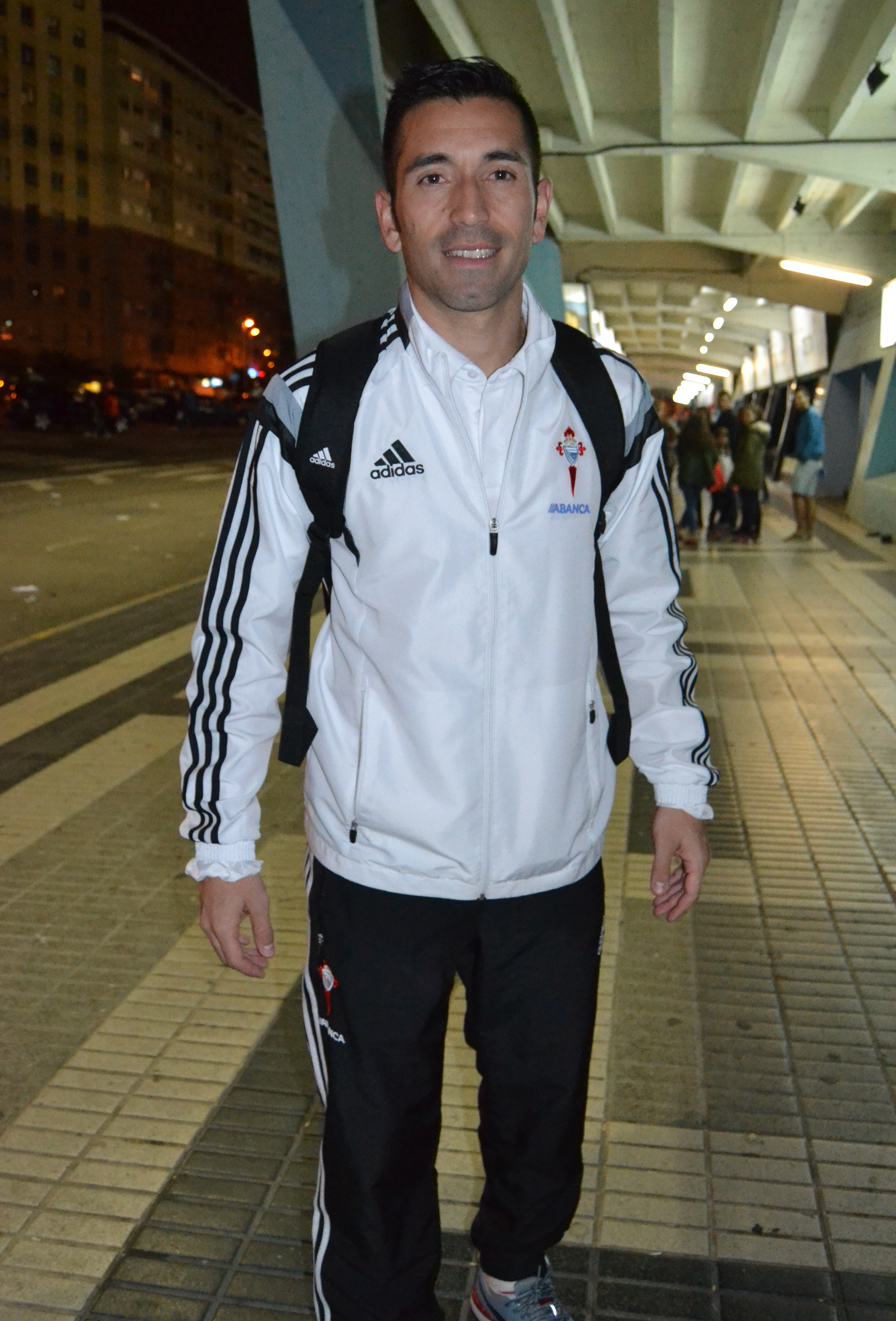
- Charles in 2015

Personal information
- Full name: Charles Dias de Oliveira
- Date of birth: 4 April 1984 (age 42)
- Place of birth: Belém, Brazil
- Height: 1.77 m (5 ft 10 in)
- Position: Striker

Youth career
- 1996: Santos
- 1997–2001: Tuna Luso
- 2001–2002: Feirense

Senior career*
Years	Team	Apps	(Gls)
2002–2004	Feirense	50	(12)
2004–2010	Pontevedra	179	(56)
2010–2012	Córdoba	66	(22)
2012–2013	Almería	40	(27)
2013–2015	Celta	58	(15)
2015–2017	Málaga	56	(14)
2017–2020	Eibar	94	(28)
2020–2023	Pontevedra	87	(30)
Total		630	(204)
- * Club domestic league appearances and goals

Charles Dias de Oliveira (born 4 April 1984), known simply as Charles, is a Brazilian former professional footballer who played as a striker.

He spent most of his career in Spain, representing clubs in La Liga, Segunda División and Segunda División B after starting out at Pontevedra. In the top flight, he achieved figures of 208 games and 57 goals over seven seasons.

== Club career ==
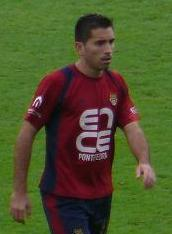
Charles playing for Pontevedra in 2007

Born in Belém, Pará, Charles started playing football with Santos, then completed his development with Tuna Luso still in his country and Feirense in Portugal. He started his senior career with the latter club, competing in both the second and third divisions.

In the summer of 2004, Charles moved to Spain, signing with Pontevedra in the Segunda División. He made his league debut on 28 August in a 0–1 home loss against Polideportivo Ejido, being sent off after only three minutes on the pitch.

Charles spent the following five seasons with the Galicians in the Segunda División B. In his last season, he led them to the promotion playoffs after scoring 15 goals in the regular season, but they eventually fell short.

In early July 2010, Charles signed for second-tier Córdoba as a free agent. He again netted 15 times in his first campaign, notably grabbing braces in wins against Xerez (3–1 away) and Albacete (5–1, home).

Charles joined Almería – also in Andalusia – for the 2012–13 season, after engaging in extensive and fruitless conversations with Córdoba to renew his contract. On 2 December 2012, he scored a hat-trick past Racing de Santander in a 4–3 away win and, already fully reconverted as a striker after having started his career as a winger, was crowned the competition's Pichichi Trophy at 27 goals (plus five in the playoffs) to help his team back to La Liga after two years.

On 27 June 2013, Charles penned a four-year contract with Celta de Vigo, as a replacement for Liverpool-bound Iago Aspas. He scored in his top-flight debut at the age of 29, in a 2–2 home draw against Espanyol.

Charles was the author of the first-ever goal at the new San Mamés Stadium on 16 September 2013, but in a 3–2 loss to Athletic Bilbao. He took his league tally to seven on 11 January of the following year, netting a brace to help the hosts come from behind and defeat Valencia 2–1.

Charles scored both goals in the 2–0 home victory over Real Madrid on 11 May 2014, which ended his opponents chances of winning the league. On 24 June 2015, he signed a two-year deal with fellow top-division Málaga.

On 3 October 2015, in matchday seven, Charles scored all of his side's goals – also their first of the new season – to help defeat Real Sociedad 3–1 at the La Rosaleda Stadium. In July 2017, he joined Eibar also from the main division, agreeing to a one-year contract on a free transfer.

On 31 July 2020, the 36-year-old Charles returned to Pontevedra. Three years later, following the club's relegation to Segunda Federación, he retired.

== Personal life ==
Charles' father, Careca, was also a footballer. A midfielder, he played for Paysandu, Santos and Remo before moving to Portugal in 1987.

Charles was cousin to two other footballers, Igor de Souza and Yuri de Souza. They too were forwards and also spent several seasons in Portugal and Spain, also representing Pontevedra.

== Career statistics ==
Appearances and goals by club, season and competition
Club	Season	League			National Cup		Other		Total	
Club	Season	Division	Apps	Goals	Apps	Goals	Apps	Goals	Apps	Goals
Feirense	2001–02	Segunda Divisão	8	3	—		—		8	3
Feirense	2002–03	Segunda Divisão	12	5	—		—		12	5
Feirense	2003–04	Segunda Liga	30	3	2	1	—		32	4
Feirense	Total		50	12	2	1	0	0	52	13
Pontevedra	2004–05	Segunda División	33	6	2	1	—		35	7
Pontevedra	2005–06	Segunda División B	36	13	1	0	2 (Note: Appearances in promotion playoffs)	0	39	13
Pontevedra	2006–07	Segunda División B	33	9	1	0	2	0	36	9
Pontevedra	2007–08	Segunda División B	16	4	2	0	2	0	20	4
Pontevedra	2008–09	Segunda División B	26	9	0	0	—		26	9
Pontevedra	2009–10	Segunda División B	35	15	0	0	3	0	38	15
Pontevedra	Total		179	56	6	1	9	0	194	57
Córdoba	2010–11	Segunda División	36	15	3	0	—		39	15
Córdoba	2011–12	Segunda División	30	7	3	1	2	0	35	8
Córdoba	Total		66	22	6	1	2	0	74	23
Almería	2012–13	Segunda División	40	27	3	0	4	5	47	32
Celta	2013–14	La Liga	30	12	1	0	—		31	12
Celta	2014–15	La Liga	28	3	3	1	—		31	4
Celta	Total		58	15	4	1	0	0	62	16
Málaga	2015–16	La Liga	35	11	0	0	—		35	11
Málaga	2016–17	La Liga	21	3	0	0	—		21	3
Málaga	Total		56	14	0	0	0	0	56	14
Eibar	2017–18	La Liga	30	8	1	0	—		31	8
Eibar	2018–19	La Liga	34	14	2	1	—		36	15
Eibar	2019–20	La Liga	30	6	3	3	—		33	9
Eibar	Total		94	28	6	4	0	0	100	32
Pontevedra	2020–21	Segunda División B	21	5	2	0	—		23	5
Pontevedra	2021–22	Segunda División RFEF	31	19	0	0	—		31	19
Pontevedra	2022–23	Primera Federación	35	6	2	0	—		37	6
Pontevedra	Total Pontevedra		266	86	10	1	9	0	285	87
Career total			630	204	31	8	15	5	676	217

== Honours ==
Feirense

- Segunda Divisão: 2002–03

Individual

- Pichichi Trophy (Segunda División): 2012–13
