= Verza (footballer) =

Spanish footballer (born 1986)

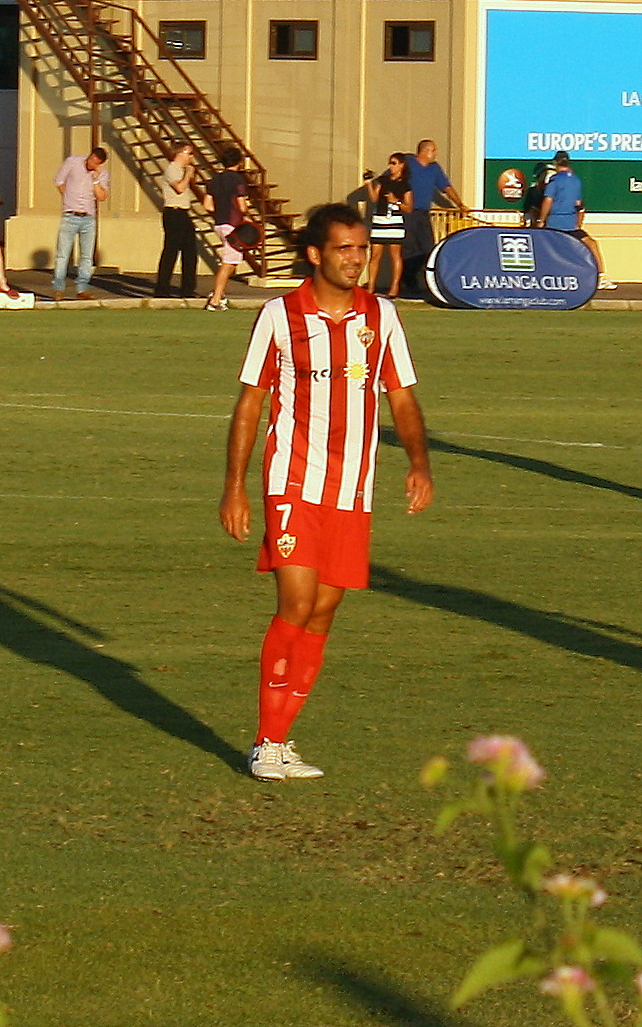
- Verza with Almería in 2013

Personal information
- Full name: José Antonio García Rabasco
- Date of birth: 29 September 1986 (age 40)
- Place of birth: Murcia, Spain
- Height: 1.82 m (5 ft 11 1/2 in)
- Position: Midfielder

Youth career
- Villarreal

Senior career*
Years	Team	Apps	(Gls)
2002–2004	Villarreal B		
2003–2005	Villarreal	4	(0)
2005	→ Recreativo (loan)	15	(0)
2005–2007	Córdoba	33	(0)
2007	→ Orihuela (loan)	18	(4)
2007–2008	Orihuela	34	(2)
2008–2011	Albacete	100	(12)
2011–2015	Almería	145	(15)
2015–2018	Levante	49	(2)
2017–2018	→ Almería (loan)	24	(2)
2018–2019	Rayo Majadahonda	24	(2)
2019–2021	Cartagena	24	(2)
2021	Murcia	12	(0)
Total		482	(41)

International career
2002	Spain U17	1	(0)
2004	Spain U19	1	(0)
- * Club domestic league appearances and goals

José Antonio García Rabasco (born 29 September 1986), known as Verza, is a Spanish former professional footballer who played as a central midfielder.

He appeared in 100 La Liga matches across five seasons, totalling 14 goals while representing Villarreal, Almería and Levante. He added 266 games and 19 goals in the Segunda División, appearing for six clubs including the last two.

== Club career ==
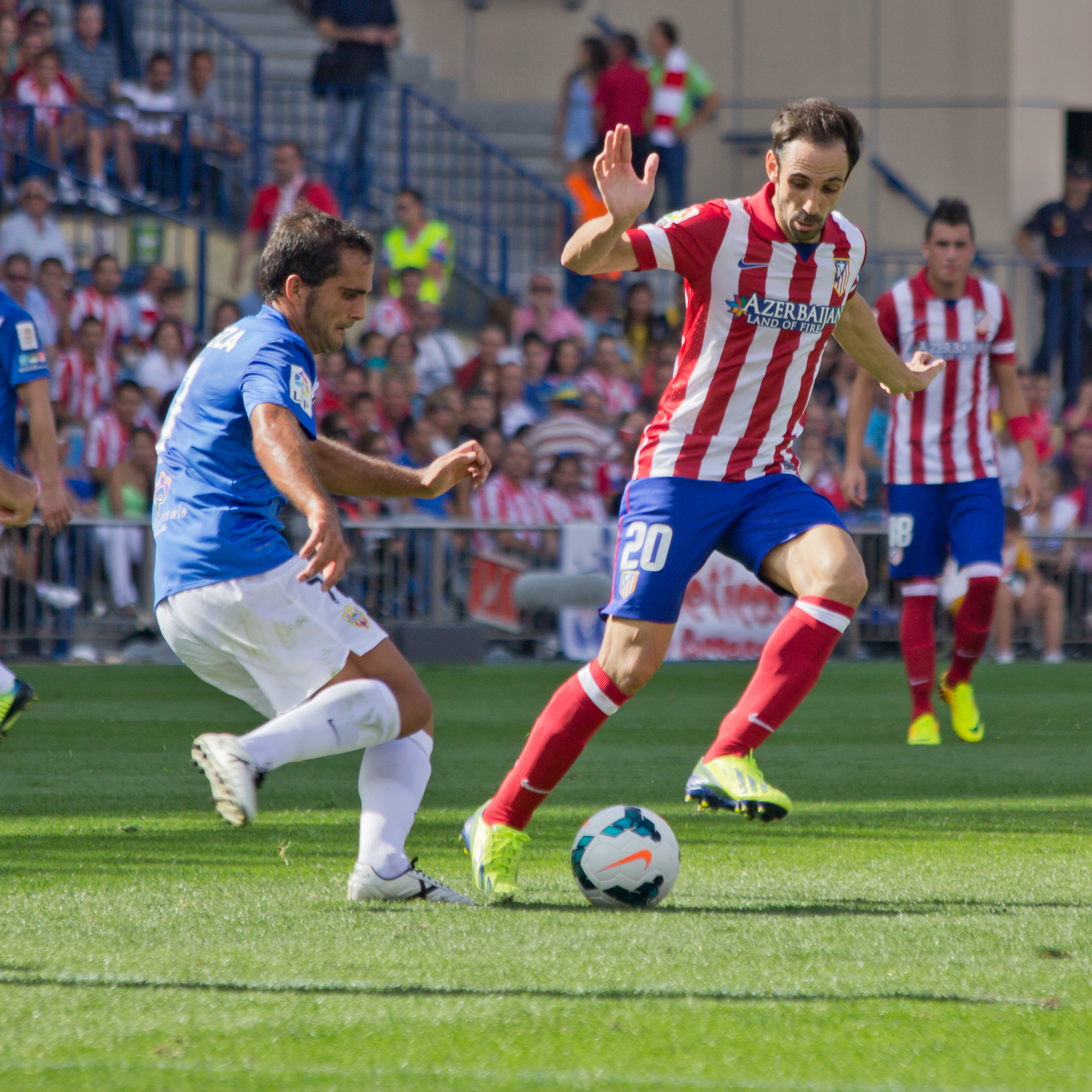
Almería's Verza (left) goes against Atlético Madrid's Juanfran in September 2013

Born in Murcia and raised in Orihuela, Province of Alicante, Verza finished his youth career in Villarreal CF's academy, going on to spend two years with the reserves in the lower leagues. On 22 June 2003, he made his first-team – and La Liga – debut, playing the last 20 minutes in a 1–4 home loss against Real Betis when he was just 16.

In January 2005, Verza was loaned to Segunda División side Recreativo de Huelva until the end of the season. In July, he joined neighbouring Córdoba CF in the Segunda División B.

In January 2007, having been sparingly used by the Andalusians, Verza moved to Orihuela CF on loan, signing permanently in July. After one and a half years with the Valencian club, he joined second-tier Albacete Balompié on a two-year deal.

Verza was an undisputed starter for the Castilla–La Mancha side the following years but, after their relegation in 2011, he terminated his contract and signed with UD Almería from the same league one week later.

Verza appeared in 40 league matches in his second season (plus four in the play-offs), helping the Rojiblancos return to the top flight after a two-year absence. He played his first game in the competition in more than one decade on 19 August 2013, starting in a 2–3 home loss to former side Villarreal, and scored his first goal later that month, from the penalty spot in the 2–2 home draw with Elche CF.

On 8 February 2014, Verza netted twice at the Estadio de los Juegos Mediterráneos to help hand Atlético Madrid the second consecutive loss of the campaign, scoring the final 2–0 through a penalty. On 7 January 2015, he scored an own goal and a penalty in the 1–1 home draw against Getafe CF in the round of 16 of the Copa del Rey.

On 8 June 2015, Verza signed a four-year deal with Levante UD after his contract expired. In August 2017, he returned to Almería by agreeing to a one-year loan.

Verza became a free agent on 29 August 2018, and joined second division team CF Rayo Majadahonda two days later. The following 19 July, after suffering relegation, he signed a two-year contract with third-tier FC Cartagena.

Verza helped Efesé in their promotion to division two in his first season, but terminated his contract on 11 January 2021 due to being rarely used in his second. He retired in 2021 aged 34, following a brief spell with Real Murcia CF.

== Personal life ==
Verza's father, José (born 1960), was also a footballer, and the former inherited the nickname from the latter. He played mainly in the lower leagues, but made one top-division appearance for Murcia.

== Career statistics ==
Appearances and goals by club, season and competition
Club	Season	League			National Cup		Continental		Other		Total	
Club	Season	Division	Apps	Goals	Apps	Goals	Apps	Goals	Apps	Goals	Apps	Goals
Villarreal	2002–03	La Liga	1	0	0	0	—		—		1	0
Villarreal	2003–04	La Liga	3	0	2	0	3 (Note: One appearance in Intertoto Cup, two appearances in UEFA Cup)	0	—		8	0
Villarreal	2004–05	La Liga	0	0	0	0	1 (Note: Appearance in UEFA Cup)	0	—		1	0
Villarreal	Total		4	0	2	0	4	0	0	0	10	0
Recreativo (loan)	2004–05	Segunda División	15	0	0	0	—		—		15	0
Córdoba	2005–06	Segunda División B	25	0	1	0	—		—		26	0
Córdoba	2006–07	Segunda División B	8	0	1	0	—		—		9	0
Córdoba	Total		33	0	2	0	0	0	0	0	35	0
Orihuela (loan)	2006–07	Segunda División B	18	4	0	0	—		—		18	4
Orihuela	2007–08	Segunda División B	34	2	0	0	—		—		34	2
Orihuela	Total		52	6	0	0	0	0	0	0	52	6
Albacete	2008–09	Segunda División	33	4	1	0	—		—		34	4
Albacete	2009–10	Segunda División	34	2	0	0	—		—		34	2
Albacete	2010–11	Segunda División	33	6	0	0	—		—		33	6
Albacete	Total		100	12	1	0	0	0	0	0	101	12
Almería	2011–12	Segunda División	38	1	3	0	—		—		41	1
Almería	2012–13	Segunda División	40	2	3	0	—		4 (Note: Appearances in La Liga play-offs)	0	47	2
Almería	2013–14	La Liga	34	8	0	0	—		—		34	8
Almería	2014–15	La Liga	33	4	3	1	—		—		36	5
Almería	Total		145	15	9	1	0	0	4	0	158	16
Levante	2015–16	La Liga	29	2	2	1	—		—		31	3
Levante	2016–17	Segunda División	20	0	1	0	—		—		21	0
Levante	2017–18	La Liga	0	0	0	0	—		—		0	0
Levante	Total		49	2	3	1	0	0	0	0	52	3
Almería (loan)	2017–18	Segunda División	24	2	1	0	—		—		25	2
Rayo Majadahonda	2018–19	Segunda División	24	2	0	0	—		—		24	2
Cartagena	2019–20	Segunda División B	19	2	0	0	—		1 (Note: Appearance in Segunda División B play-offs)	0	20	2
Cartagena	2020–21	Segunda División	5	0	0	0	—		—		5	0
Cartagena	Total		24	2	0	0	0	0	1	0	25	2
Murcia	2020–21	Segunda División B	12	0	0	0	—		—		12	0
Career total			482	41	18	2	4	0	5	0	509	43

== Honours ==
Villarreal

- UEFA Intertoto Cup: 2003

Almería

- Segunda División play-offs: 2012–13

Levante

- Segunda División: 2016–17
