= Chumbi (footballer) =

Spanish footballer (born 1989)

Personal information
- Full name: Rafael Fernández Martínez
- Date of birth: 5 May 1989 (age 37)
- Place of birth: Águilas, Spain
- Height: 1.75 m (5 ft 9 in)
- Position: Forward

Team information
- Current team: Marbella
- Number: 9

Youth career
- Murcia
- Atlético Madrid

Senior career*
Years	Team	Apps	(Gls)
2007–2009	Atlético C	51	(11)
2009–2010	Caravaca	7	(0)
2010	Lorca Deportiva	18	(15)
2010–2012	Reus	73	(21)
2012–2013	Almería B	18	(10)
2012–2013	Almería	5	(1)
2013–2014	Valencia B	38	(17)
2014–2015	Albacete	33	(6)
2015–2016	Llagostera	18	(0)
2016–2018	Lorca	27	(15)
2018–2021	Murcia	50	(12)
2021	Marbella	16	(5)
2021–2022	Águilas	23	(9)
2022–2023	UCAM Murcia	33	(8)
2023–2024	Atlético Pulpileño	18	(3)
- * Club domestic league appearances and goals as of 28 January 2024

Rafael Fernández Martínez (born 5 May 1989), commonly known as Chumbi, is a Spanish footballer who plays as a forward.

== Club career ==
Born in Águilas, Region of Murcia, Chumbi started playing as a senior with Atlético Madrid's C-team. In summer 2009 he joined Caravaca CF of Segunda División B but, in the following transfer window, returned to Tercera División by signing with Lorca Deportiva CF.

In July 2010, Chumbi moved to CF Reus Deportiu still in the fourth division. In his first season he scored 12 goals (three of them in the play-offs), helping the Catalans return to the third level after five years.

In January 2012, Chumbi was linked with a move to Elche CF, but the deal could not be completed. On 20 June he signed a contract with UD Almería, being assigned to the reserves in division three.

Chumbi made his debut with Almería's first team on 17 October 2012, coming off the bench for Jonathan in the 83rd minute of a 3–0 home win against AD Alcorcón for the campaign's Copa del Rey. He made his first appearance in Segunda División two months later, replacing Ángel Trujillo in a 0–1 defeat at Elche CF; he netted his first goal as a professional on 6 January of the following year, being pivotal in the Andalusians' 1–0 away win against Girona FC after only six minutes on the field.

On 8 July 2013, Chumbi was released by Almería. Late in the same month, he joined Valencia CF Mestalla in the third tier.

On 10 July 2014, Chumbi signed a two-year deal with Albacete Balompié, recently promoted to the second division. On 20 July of the following year, he moved to fellow league club UE Llagostera. Following 19 goalless appearances and team relegation, he returned to his native region and the third level after joining Lorca FC.

After being sidelined for 15 months with a serious knee injury, Chumbi signed for Real Murcia of the third tier on 13 July 2018.
