= Corona (footballer) =

Spanish footballer and football executive

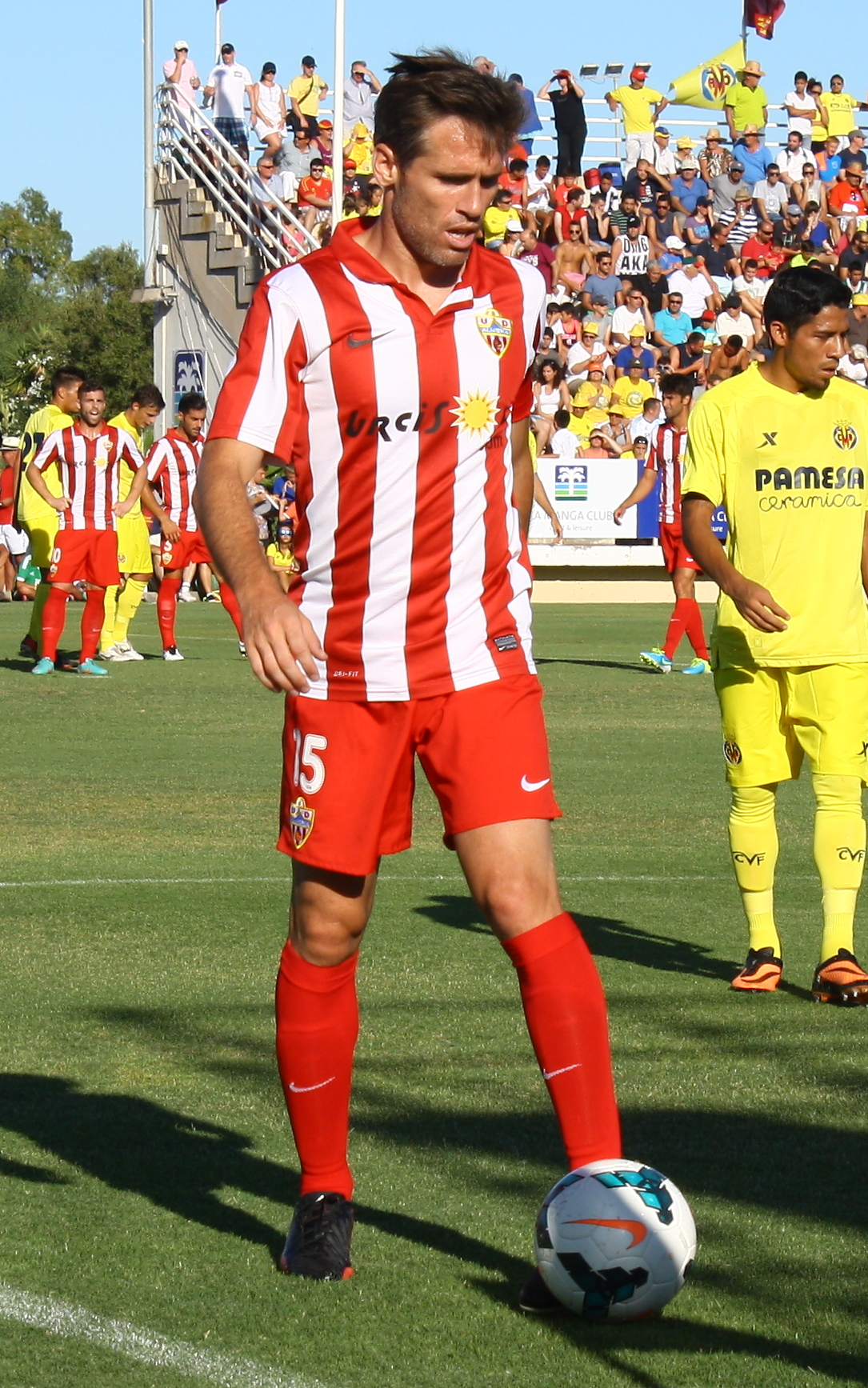
- Corona with Almería in 2013

Personal information
- Full name: Miguel Ángel García Pérez-Roldán
- Date of birth: 12 February 1981 (age 45)
- Place of birth: Talavera de la Reina, Spain
- Height: 1.75 m (5 ft 9 in)
- Position: Attacking midfielder

Youth career
- Real Madrid

Senior career*
Years	Team	Apps	(Gls)
1999–2000	Real Madrid C		
2000–2001	Real Madrid B	30	(12)
2001–2007	Zaragoza	62	(2)
2004–2005	→ Poli Ejido (loan)	31	(1)
2006	→ Albacete (loan)	13	(2)
2006–2007	→ Almería (loan)	40	(7)
2007–2015	Almería	245	(13)
2015–2016	Brisbane Roar	29	(2)
2016–2017	Almería	20	(0)
Total		470	(39)

International career
1997–1998	Spain U16	17	(4)
1997–1998	Spain U17	10	(1)
1998–2000	Spain U18	12	(2)
2001	Spain U20	1	(0)
2000–2003	Spain U21	15	(1)
Medal record
Men's football
Representing Spain
UEFA European Under-16 Championship
Winner	1997 Germany
- * Club domestic league appearances and goals

Miguel Ángel García Pérez-Roldán (born 12 February 1981), known as Corona, is a Spanish former footballer who played as an attacking midfielder. He is the current director of football of Super League Greece club Panathinaikos.

After starting out at Real Madrid, he spent most of his career at Almería, appearing in 333 official matches and scoring 23 goals. He also played professionally in Australia.

== Club career ==
=== Real Madrid and Zaragoza ===
Corona was born in Talavera de la Reina, Province of Toledo. A product of La Liga powerhouse Real Madrid, he played for their C and B teams, the latter competing in the Segunda División B.

Corona was signed by Real Zaragoza in January 2001, but only appeared in 33 top-division games for the Aragonese over four seasons, with loans in the Segunda División in between (one season with Polideportivo Ejido, six months with Albacete).

=== Almería ===
Corona was loaned again in 2006–07, now to Almería, being instrumental in the Andalusia side's first-ever promotion to the top flight and reuniting with his former Zaragoza teammate Fernando Soriano. The move was made permanent for the following campaign, and both players were instrumental as the team went on to finish eighth in their maiden season in that league.

Corona scored his first goal in the top division with a header, in a 2–1 away defeat against Osasuna on 9 March 2008, his only in the season. He continued to be a regular in the subsequent years, often starting but rarely finishing a match.

On 19 January 2011, Corona scored one of Almería's most important goals, in a 3–2 win at Deportivo de La Coruña (4–2 on aggregate), with the club reaching the semi-finals of the Copa del Rey for the first time ever. On 9 April, through a counter-attack, he opened the score for the last-placed team at Barcelona – his second goal of the season – but the hosts eventually won 3–1, and the visitors eventually suffered relegation after a four-year stay.

In the following two seasons in division two, Corona was an undisputed starter for the Rojiblancos, totalling seven goals. However, he was sparingly used during the first half of 2013–14's top flight, regaining his starting position in mid-March 2014 and thus becoming the third player with most appearances in the competition for the club.

=== Brisbane Roar ===
Corona terminated his contract with Almería on 23 September 2015, and signed for Australian A-League side Brisbane Roar the following week. He left the former with competitive totals of 312 games and 23 goals, only behind José Ortiz.

On 12 May 2016, Corona won the 'Gary Wilkins Medal' as the Roar's Player of the Year.

=== Return to Almería ===
After cutting ties with Brisbane, Corona returned to Almería on 15 July 2016 after agreeing to a one-year deal. He was used mainly as a substitute during the second-tier campaign, contributing 580 minutes as his team avoided relegation in the last matchday.

On 15 June 2017, the 36-year-old Corona announced his retirement and was immediately appointed Almería's director of football. In January 2020, he joined Valencia in the same capacity.

== Career statistics ==
Club	Season	League			Cup		Other		Total	
Club	Season	Division	Apps	Goals	Apps	Goals	Apps	Goals	Apps	Goals
Real Madrid B	1999–2000	Segunda División B	10	3	—		—		10	3
Real Madrid B	2000–01	Segunda División B	20	9	—		—		20	9
Real Madrid B	Total		30	12	—		—		30	12
Zaragoza	2000–01	La Liga	2	0	0	0	—		2	0
Zaragoza	2001–02	La Liga	11	0	1	0	2 (Note: Appearances in UEFA Cup)	0	14	0
Zaragoza	2002–03	Segunda División	29	2	1	0	—		30	2
Zaragoza	2003–04	La Liga	17	0	3	0	—		20	0
Zaragoza	2005–06	La Liga	3	0	1	0	—		4	0
Zaragoza	Total		62	2	6	0	2	0	70	2
Poli Ejido (loan)	2004–05	Segunda División	31	1	1	0	—		32	1
Albacete (loan)	2005–06	Segunda División	13	2	0	0	—		13	2
Almería (loan)	2006–07	Segunda División	40	7	1	0	—		41	7
Almería	2007–08	La Liga	32	1	2	0	—		34	1
Almería	2008–09	La Liga	30	1	1	1	—		31	2
Almería	2009–10	La Liga	22	1	2	0	—		24	1
Almería	2010–11	La Liga	30	2	7	1	—		37	3
Almería	2011–12	Segunda División	41	3	4	0	—		45	3
Almería	2012–13	Segunda División	33	4	1	0	4 (Note: Appearances in Segunda División play-offs)	0	38	4
Almería	2013–14	La Liga	23	1	3	1	—		26	2
Almería	2014–15	La Liga	31	0	2	0	—		33	0
Almería	2015–16	Segunda División	3	0	0	0	—		3	0
Almería	Total		285	20	23	3	4	0	312	23
Brisbane Roar	2015–16	A-League	29	2	0	0	—		29	2
Almería	2016–17	Segunda División	20	0	1	0	—		21	0
Career total			470	39	31	3	6	0	507	42

== Honours ==
Spain

- UEFA European Under-16 Championship: 1997

Individual

- PFA A-League Team of the Season: 2015–16
