= Jonathan Zongo =

Burkinabé footballer (born 1989)

Personal information
- Full name: Jonathan Sundy Zongo
- Date of birth: 6 April 1989 (age 37)
- Place of birth: Ouagadougou, Burkina Faso
- Height: 1.83 m (6 ft 0 in)
- Positions: Winger; forward

Youth career
- Ouagadougou

Senior career*
Years	Team	Apps	(Gls)
2009–2010	Ouagadougou		
2010–2013	Almería B	52	(11)
2011–2017	Almería	102	(6)
2019	Army United		
2019–2020	Badalona	1	(0)
Total		155	(17)

International career
2013–2017	Burkina Faso	22	(2)
Medal record
Representing Burkina Faso
Africa Cup of Nations
Third place	2017 Gabon
- * Club domestic league appearances and goals

Jonathan Sundy Zongo (born 6 April 1989) is a Burkinabé former professional footballer who played as a winger or forward. He was a Burkina Faso international, appeared between 2013 and 2017.

He spent the better part of his 11-year senior career in Spain, appearing in 111 competitive matches for Almería and taking part in two La Liga seasons with the club. He also played professionally in Thailand.

== Club career ==
=== Almería ===
Born in Ouagadougou, Zongo began his career with hometown club US Ouagadougou. In October 2010, he moved to Spain and joined UD Almería, being initially assigned to the reserve team in the Segunda División B. One month after arriving he suffered a knee injury, going on to miss several weeks.

Zongo made his official debut with the Andalusians' main squad on 13 January 2011, coming on as a second-half substitute for Kalu Uche in a 1–0 home win against Deportivo de La Coruña in the quarter-finals of the Copa del Rey. He played his first game in the Segunda División on 29 January of the following year, against Gimnàstic de Tarragona.

Again coming from the bench, Zongo scored his first goals for Almería on 19 May 2012, netting a late brace in a 2–0 home victory over AD Alcorcón. For the 2012–13 season he was promoted to the first team, and appeared mostly from the bench in the early stages. However, in January, after the departures of Aarón Ñíguez and Leonardo Ulloa, he began being more utilised in manager Javi Gracia's starting XI as a winger, keeping his place under Gracia's successor Francisco.

On 28 June 2013, Zongo was definitely promoted to Almería's main squad, with the club in La Liga. In August, however, he declined a first-team contract, being again demoted to the reserves. On 12 November he finally agreed to a deal, running until 2017.

Zongo played his first match in the Spanish top division on 4 January 2014, featuring the last 19 minutes in a 3–0 home defeat of Granada CF and becoming the first Burkinabé footballer to appear in the competition. He scored his first league goal late in the month, the only in a win over Getafe CF also at the Estadio de los Juegos Mediterráneos.

On 16 December 2014, in a 2–1 home win against Real Betis in the Copa del Rey, Zongo scored from 50 metres to lob goalkeeper Dani Giménez. He was regularly used during the campaign, but the side suffered relegation.

Zongo suffered a knee injury while on international duty in January 2017 and was sidelined for several months. His contract expired before he was fully recovered, and he left the club.

=== Later years ===
On 8 January 2019, following a lengthy period as a free agent, Zongo signed for Thai League 2 side Army United FC. He returned to Spain on 16 August, agreeing to a deal at CF Badalona of the third tier.

Zongo announced his retirement from professional football on 23 December 2020 at the age of 31, after failing to completely recover from his 2017 injury.

== International career ==
On 7 August 2013, Zongo was called up to the Burkina Faso national team for a friendly with Morocco. He made his debut seven days later, playing the full 90 minutes in a 2–1 away win. On 21 May of the following year he scored his first international goal, the equaliser in a 1–1 draw against Senegal.

In January 2017, during a 2017 Africa Cup of Nations match against Gabon, Zongo suffered a severe knee injury.

== Career statistics ==
=== Club ===
As of 3 December 2016

Appearances and goals by club, season and competition
Club	Season	League			Cup		Other (Note: Includes Segunda División play-offs.)		Total	
Club	Season	Division	Apps	Goals	Apps	Goals	Apps	Goals	Apps	Goals
Almería B	2010–11	Segunda División B	18	6	—		—		18	6
Almería B	2011–12	Segunda División B	22	5	—		—		22	5
Almería B	2012–13	Segunda División B	2	0	—		—		2	0
Almería B	2013–14	Segunda División B	10	0	—		—		10	0
Almería B	Total		52	11	0	0	0	0	52	11
Almería	2010–11	La Liga	0	0	2	0	—		2	0
Almería	2011–12	Segunda División	14	2	1	0	—		15	2
Almería	2012–13	Segunda División	25	1	3	1	3	0	31	2
Almería	2013–14	La Liga	18	1	1	0	—		19	1
Almería	2014–15	La Liga	27	2	1	1	—		28	3
Almería	2015–16	Segunda División	12	0	1	0	—		13	0
Almería	2016–17	Segunda División	3	0	0	0	—		3	0
Almería	Total		99	6	9	2	3	0	111	7
Career total			151	17	9	2	3	0	163	19

=== International ===
Appearances and goals by national team and year
National team	Year	Apps	Goals
Burkina Faso	2013	4	0
Burkina Faso	2014	8	1
Burkina Faso	2015	4	1
Burkina Faso	2016	4	0
Burkina Faso	2017	2	0
Total		22	2

#	Date	Venue	Opponent	Score	Result	Competition
1	21 May 2014	Stade du 4-Août, Burkina Faso	Senegal	1–1	1–1	Friendly
2	13 June 2015	Stade du 4-Août, Burkina Faso	Comoros	2–0	2–0	2017 ACN qualifiers
