= Ángel Trujillo =

Spanish footballer (born 1987)

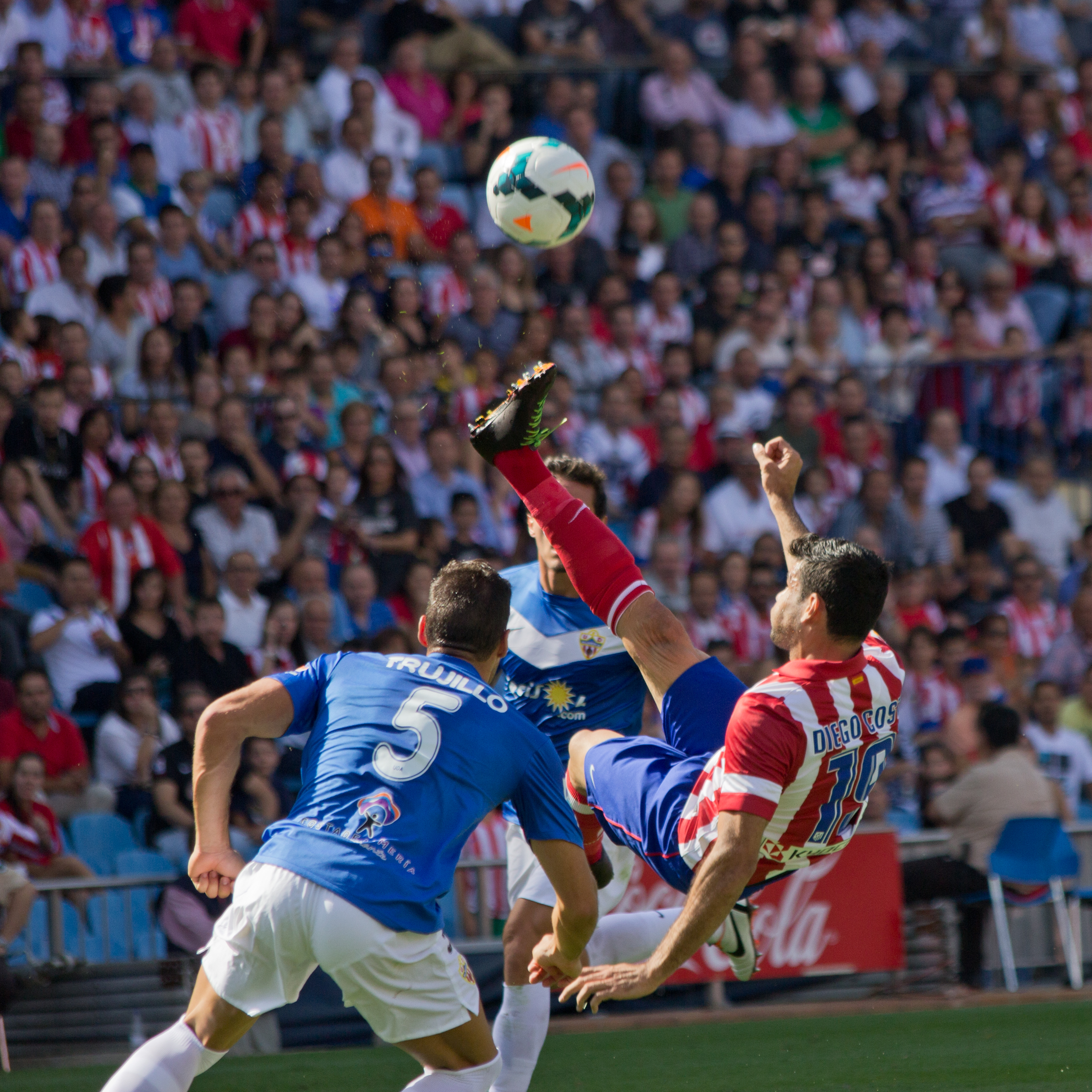
- Trujillo (left) with Almería in 2013

Personal information
- Full name: Ángel Trujillo Canorea
- Date of birth: 8 September 1987 (age 39)
- Place of birth: San Fernando de Henares, Spain
- Height: 1.79 m (5 ft 10 in)
- Position: Centre-back

Youth career
- Guadalajara

Senior career*
Years	Team	Apps	(Gls)
2006–2007	Guadalajara		
2007	Azuqueca		
2007–2012	Almería B	161	(10)
2012–2015	Almería	101	(1)
2015–2016	Levante	8	(0)
2016–2019	Almería	45	(0)
Total		315	(11)
- * Club domestic league appearances and goals

Ángel Trujillo Canorea (born 8 September 1987) is a Spanish former professional footballer who played as a central defender.

He spent the better part of his career with Almería, having arrived at the club in 2007.

== Club career ==
Born in San Fernando de Henares, Community of Madrid, Trujillo started playing as a senior with CD Guadalajara in the Tercera División, moving in early 2007 to the regional leagues with CD Azuqueca. In the summer, he returned to the fourth division and signed with UD Almería's reserves.

Trujillo made his first-team debut for the Andalusians on 18 March 2012, featuring the first half of a 1–1 Segunda División away draw against Real Valladolid. On 27 May, he played his second game with the main squad and in the competition, a 1–0 away victory over former side Guadalajara.

In June 2012, it was announced that Trujillo would be promoted to Almería's first team for 2012–13. Despite missing the start of the season, he was handed a start on 8 September in a 3–0 away defeat against CE Sabadell FC, but soon established himself as a regular due to Hernán Pellerano's legal problems, and contributed 31 matches as they obtained promotion in the play-offs.

On 12 July 2013, Trujillo renewed his contract until 2017. He made his La Liga debut on 19 August, starting the 2–3 home loss to Villarreal CF.

Trujillo scored his only goal as a professional on 2 March 2014, netting from a corner kick but in a 4–1 defeat at FC Barcelona. On 7 August 2015, he moved to fellow top-tier club Levante UD after agreeing to a four-year deal.

On 5 August 2016, having struggled with injuries and suffered relegation, Trujillo returned to Almería on a three-year contract.

== Career statistics ==
Club	Season	Competition	League		Cup		Other		Total	
Club	Season	Competition	Apps	Goals	Apps	Goals	Apps	Goals	Apps	Goals
Almería B	2007–08	Tercera División	26	3	—				26	3
Almería B	2008–09	Tercera División	34	2	—		2 (Note: Appearances in Tercera División promotion playoffs)	0	36	2
Almería B	2009–10	Tercera División	35	2	—		6	0	41	2
Almería B	2010–11	Segunda División B	36	3	—				36	3
Almería B	2011–12	Segunda División B	30	0	—				30	0
Almería B	Total		161	10	—		8	0	169	10
Almería	2011–12	Segunda División	2	0	0	0	—		2	0
Almería	2012–13	Segunda División	27	0	4	0	4 (Note: Appearances in La Liga play-offs)	0	35	0
Almería	2013–14	La Liga	36	1	3	0	—		39	1
Almería	2014–15	La Liga	36	0	1	0	—		37	0
Almería	Total		101	1	8	0	4	0	113	1
Levante	2015–16	La Liga	8	0	0	0	—		8	0
Almería	2016–17	Segunda División	21	0	0	0	—		21	0
Almería	2017–18	Segunda División	19	0	1	0	—		20	0
Almería	2018–19	Segunda División	5	0	4	0	—		9	0
Almería	Total		45	0	5	0	—		50	0
Career totals			315	11	13	0	12	0	341	11
