= Fernando Soriano =

Spanish former professional footballer (born 1979)

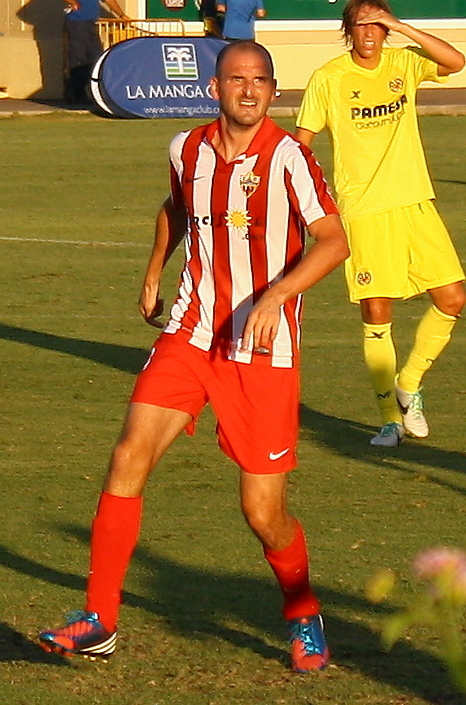
- Soriano with Almería in 2013

Personal information
- Full name: Fernando Soriano Marco
- Date of birth: 24 September 1979 (age 47)
- Place of birth: Zaragoza, Spain
- Height: 1.88 m (6 ft 2 in)
- Position: Central midfielder

Youth career
- Zaragoza

Senior career*
Years	Team	Apps	(Gls)
1997–2001	Zaragoza B	144	(32)
2001–2005	Zaragoza	81	(6)
2001–2002	→ Recreativo (loan)	39	(4)
2005–2010	Almería	149	(19)
2010–2011	Osasuna	30	(2)
2011–2016	Almería	163	(23)
Total		606	(86)

International career
1995–1996	Spain U16	6	(1)
1997	Spain U17	5	(0)
1998	Spain U18	1	(0)
1999	Spain U20	2	(0)

Managerial career
- 2016–2017: Almería
- * Club domestic league appearances and goals

Fernando Soriano Marco (born 24 September 1979) is a Spanish former professional footballer who played as a central midfielder.

He spent most of his 19-year career with Almería, totalling ten seasons in two different spells. In La Liga, where he also represented Zaragoza and Osasuna, he amassed totals of 229 games and 21 goals, adding the same number of matches and 33 goals in the Segunda División.

Over nine months and starting in 2016, Soriano also managed Almería.

== Playing career ==
Soriano was born in Zaragoza, Aragon. A product of hometown Real Zaragoza's youth ranks, he was loaned to Segunda División side Recreativo de Huelva before appearing with the main squad, which happened in the 2002–03 season in the same league.

In La Liga, Soriano proved a very useful midfield element. In the 2003–04 campaign, he scored the winner in 2–1 wins over Racing de Santander and FC Barcelona while also helping his team to victory in the Copa del Rey.

Soriano joined UD Almería for 2005–06, netting seven goals in his first year. He was an instrumental figure in the club's first-ever top division promotion the next season, reuniting with his former Zaragoza teammate Corona; both players were instrumental the following campaign, as the Andalusians finished eighth in their maiden experience in the top flight.

Soriano had a successful season overall in 2009–10, as Almería retained their status for the third consecutive year. Without the presence of striker Álvaro Negredo, he was much more depended upon in scoring matters and netted seven times in 35 games, joint-second in the team as they finished in 13th position (he also collected 13 yellow cards); on several occasions, he was deployed as a supporting striker.

On 21 May 2010, the free agent Soriano signed for 2+1 years with CA Osasuna. He made his official debut for the Navarrese in the season opener, a 0–0 home draw against his former team Almería.

After a disappointing campaign overall, Soriano terminated his contract with Osasuna and returned to his previous club in late July 2011, penning a three-year deal. He scored a career-best 12 goals from 39 appearances in the 2012–13 campaign, helping the team to return to the top flight after a two-year absence.

== Managerial career ==
On 17 May 2016, aged 36, Soriano retired and was immediately appointed manager of Almería until the end of the second-tier season. After managing to avoid relegation and remain unbeaten in his four games in charge (two wins and two draws), he renewed his contract for a further year.

Soriano signed as sporting director at UD Ibiza in December 2018. He left his post in April 2022 and, on 16 June 2023, joined Deportivo de La Coruña in the same capacity.

== Career statistics ==
Club	Season	Competition	League		Cup		Continental		Other		Total	
Club	Season	Competition	Apps	Goals	Apps	Goals	Apps	Goals	Apps	Goals	Apps	Goals
Zaragoza B	1997–98	Segunda División B	34	9	—						34	9
Zaragoza B	1998–99	Segunda División B	35	6	—						35	6
Zaragoza B	1999–2000	Segunda División B	32	10	—				6	0	38	10
Zaragoza B	2000–01	Segunda División B	37	7	—						37	7
Zaragoza B	Total		138	32	—				6	0	144	32
Recreativo	2001–02	Segunda División	39	4	0	0	—				39	4
Zaragoza	2002–03	Segunda División	38	4	2	1	—				40	5
Zaragoza	2003–04	La Liga	24	2	3	1	—				27	3
Zaragoza	2004–05	La Liga	19	0	0	0	8	1	1	0	28	1
Zaragoza	Total		81	6	5	2	8	1	1	0	95	9
Almería	2005–06	Segunda División	34	7	1	0	—				35	7
Almería	2006–07	Segunda División	22	2	0	0	—				22	2
Almería	2007–08	La Liga	34	2	1	0	—				35	2
Almería	2008–09	La Liga	24	1	2	0	—				26	1
Almería	2009–10	La Liga	35	7	1	0	—				36	7
Almería	Total		149	19	5	0	—				154	19
Osasuna	2010–11	La Liga	30	2	1	0	—				31	2
Almería	2011–12	Segunda División	34	4	4	2	—				38	6
Almería	2012–13	Segunda División	39	12	2	0	—		4	0	45	12
Almería	2013–14	La Liga	35	4	0	0	—				35	4
Almería	2014–15	La Liga	28	3	2	0	—				30	3
Almería	2015–16	Segunda División	23	0	3	2	—				26	2
Almería	Total		159	23	11	4	—		4	0	174	27
Career totals			596	86	22	6	8	1	11	0	637	93

== Managerial statistics ==
As of match played 26 February 2017

Managerial record by team and tenure
Team	Nat	From	To	Record							
Team	Nat	From	To	G	W	D	L	GF	GA	GD	Win %
Almería	(Spain)	17 May 2016	26 February 2017	32	8	9	15	32	37	−5	25.00
Total				32	8	9	15	32	37	−5	25.00

== Honours ==
Zaragoza

- Copa del Rey: 2003–04
- Supercopa de España: 2004
