= Adrián Gunino =

Uruguayan footballer (born 1989)

Personal information
- Full name: Adrián Javier Gunino Duque
- Date of birth: 3 February 1989 (age 37)
- Place of birth: Montevideo, Uruguay
- Height: 1.67 m (5 ft 6 in)
- Position: Right back

Youth career
- Danubio

Senior career*
Years	Team	Apps	(Gls)
2008–2011	Danubio	16	(0)
2009–2010	→ Boca Juniors (loan)	1	(0)
2010–2011	→ Toulouse (loan)	29	(0)
2011–2012	Peñarol	6	(0)
2012–2015	Fénix	11	(0)
2012–2013	→ Almería (loan)	27	(0)
2014–2015	→ Córdoba (loan)	23	(0)

International career
2009	Uruguay U20	8	(0)
- * Club domestic league appearances and goals

Adrián Javier Gunino Duque (born 3 February 1989) is an Uruguayan former footballer who played as a right back.

== Club career ==
Born in Montevideo, Gunino made his senior debuts with hometown's Danubio F.C., appearing in four matches during his first campaign, and in further 12 in his second. On 25 July 2009 he was loaned to Boca Juniors, and made his maiden appearance for the club on 3 September, coming on as a first-half substitute in a 1-1 home draw against Newell's Old Boys.

On 20 June 2010 Gunino moved teams and countries again, joining Toulouse FC also in a temporary deal. He made his Ligue 1 debut on 7 August, starting and playing the full 90 minutes in a 2–0 home success over Stade Brestois 29, and finished the campaign with 29 appearances as Les Pitchouns finished eighth.

On 16 August 2011, Gunino signed a one-year deal with C.A. Peñarol, but after being sparingly used (only six matches, 137 minutes of action), he was released in January of the following year, and subsequently moved to Centro Atlético Fénix on 14 February.

On 23 July 2012, Gunino signed a one-year loan contract with a buyout clause for UD Almería. Initially as a backup to Rafita, he appeared in 31 matches during his only season, as the Andalusians were promoted in the play-offs.

On 27 January 2014, he joined Córdoba CF also in a temporary deal. Gunino was also a starter during his six-month spell, as the verdiblancos returned to La Liga after a 42-year absence. On 17 July, his loan was renewed for a further year.

Gunino made his debut in the Spanish top level on 25 August 2014, starting in a 0–2 away loss against Real Madrid.

== International career ==
In 2009 Gunino began playing for the Uruguay U-20 team. He helped the team finish in 3rd place in the 2009 South American Youth Championship.
