= Abel Molinero =

Spanish footballer

Personal information
- Full name: Abel Molinero Pons
- Date of birth: 28 April 1989 (age 37)
- Place of birth: Madrid, Spain
- Height: 1.79 m (5 ft 10 1/2 in)
- Position: Winger

Team information
- Current team: Marchamalo

Youth career
- Atlético Madrid

Senior career*
Years	Team	Apps	(Gls)
2007–2010	Atlético Madrid C	71	(14)
2010–2011	Atlético Madrid B	15	(2)
2011–2012	Almería B	31	(5)
2011–2013	Almería	12	(0)
2013–2014	Jaén	0	(0)
2014	San Fernando	14	(2)
2014–2015	Guadalajara	36	(11)
2015–2016	Lugo	7	(1)
2016–2017	Fuenlabrada	24	(4)
2017–2018	Real Murcia	12	(1)
2018	Barakaldo	8	(0)
2018–2019	Talavera	33	(10)
2019–2021	Lleida	48	(4)
2021–2022	Águilas	16	(2)
2022	Móstoles	13	(0)
2022–2023	Alcalá	26	(5)
2023	Colonia Moscardó	13	(0)
2024	Azuqueca	12	(0)
2024–	Marchamalo	6	(1)
- * Club domestic league appearances and goals as of 13 October 2024

Abel Molinero Pons (born 28 April 1989) is a Spanish footballer who plays for Marchamalo as a left winger.

== Club career ==
Born in Madrid, Molinero started playing as a senior with local Atlético Madrid's C-team, going on to appear sparingly for the B-side over the course of two Segunda División B seasons. His best output with the latter consisted of nine games and one goal, in 2010–11.

In summer 2011, Molinero signed with UD Almería, being assigned to the reserves also in the third level. He made his debut with the Andalusians' first team on 13 December, coming on as a substitute for Omar in a 1–3 home loss against CA Osasuna for the campaign's Copa del Rey (2–4 on aggregate).

On 26 June 2012, Molinero was definitely promoted to Almería's main squad in Segunda División. On 2 September of the following year, the free agent signed a short-term contract with neighbouring Real Jaén.

On 31 January 2014, after featuring sparingly for Jaén, Molinero joined third division club San Fernando CD. On 8 July, he moved to fellow league team CD Guadalajara.

On 13 July 2015, after scoring 12 goals for the Castile-La Mancha side – playoffs included – Molinero signed a two-year deal with CD Lugo from the second tier.
