= Diego García (footballer, born 1990) =

Spanish footballer

Diego
Personal information
- Full name: Diego García Bravo
- Date of birth: 13 January 1990 (age 36)
- Place of birth: Oviedo, Spain
- Height: 1.90 m (6 ft 3 in)
- Position: Goalkeeper

Team information
- Current team: Gijón Industrial

Youth career
- 2005–2006: Oviedo ACF
- 2006–2009: Real Madrid

Senior career*
Years	Team	Apps	(Gls)
2009–2010	Zaragoza B		
2010–2011	Almería B	14	(0)
2011–2013	Almería	0	(0)
2013–2015	Ponferradina	0	(0)
2014	→ Elche B (loan)	12	(0)
2015	Alcoyano	7	(0)
2015–2016	Olímpic Xàtiva	39	(0)
2017–2019	Sanluqueño	64	(0)
2019	Moralo	18	(0)
2019–2020	Alcobendas Sport	8	(0)
2020	Horta	1	(0)
2021	Vestri	4	(0)
2022–	Gijón Industrial	5	(0)
- * Club domestic league appearances and goals as of 13:45, 12 May 2022 (UTC)

Diego García Bravo (born 13 January 1990), known simply as Diego, is a Spanish footballer who plays for UD Gijón Industrial as a goalkeeper.

== Club career ==
Born in Oviedo, Asturias, Diego spent three years in Real Madrid's youth system, leaving the club in 2009. Subsequently, he signed with Deportivo Aragón, playing one season in the Tercera División.

Diego joined UD Almería in the 2010 off-season, spending his first year with the reserves in the Segunda División B as backup. He was promoted to the first team after Diego Alves' departure to Valencia CF in the summer of 2011.

Diego made his official debut for the Andalusians on 7 September 2011, in a 2–0 extra time home win against CD Guadalajara in the second round of the Copa del Rey. In June 2013, he was released after failing to appear in a single league match. The following month, he signed a two-year contract with SD Ponferradina also from Segunda División.

On 26 January 2014, Diego was loaned to Elche CF Ilicitano of the third tier until June. On 21 January of the following year, he cut ties with Ponfe after failing to make any competitive appearances, and moved to third-division side CD Alcoyano two days later.

Subsequently, Diego took his game to the Spanish amateur leagues. He also had a very brief spell in Iceland with Vestri.
