= Stéphane Pignol =

French footballer (born 1977)

Personal information
- Full name: Stéphane Jean François Pignol
- Date of birth: 3 January 1977 (age 49)
- Place of birth: Aubagne, France
- Height: 1.84 m (6 ft 0 in)
- Position: Right back

Senior career*
Years	Team	Apps	(Gls)
1996–1997	Aubagne		
1997–2003	Compostela	101	(1)
1998–1999	→ Pontevedra (loan)	29	(2)
2003–2004	Almería	29	(1)
2004–2005	Numancia	33	(0)
2005–2008	Murcia	88	(0)
2008–2009	Zaragoza	26	(0)
2009–2013	Las Palmas	125	(2)
Total		431	(6)
- * Club domestic league appearances and goals

Stéphane Jean François Pignol (born 3 January 1977) is a French retired professional footballer who played as a right back.

He appeared in 311 games in Segunda División over 11 seasons, scoring one goal. In La Liga, he represented Compostela, Numancia and Murcia.

== Club career ==
Born in Aubagne, Bouches-du-Rhône, Pignol spent his entire professional career in Spain, representing SD Compostela (where he made his La Liga debut, consisting of three games in the 1997–98 season), Pontevedra CF, UD Almería, CD Numancia – was the Soria club's starter throughout the vast majority of the 2004–05 campaign, which again ended in top-flight relegation for the player – Real Murcia, Real Zaragoza and UD Las Palmas.

Pignol never appeared in less than 25 league matches during his spell in the Canary Islands, spent in Segunda División. At the end of 2012–13, after having helped Las Palmas to the sixth position, the 36-year-old retired from football.

== Personal life ==
Born in France, Pignol is of Spanish descent. Pignol's older brother, Christophe (born 1969), was also a professional footballer and a defender. During his 14-year career he represented AS Saint-Étienne, FC Istres, FC Nantes, AS Monaco FC and Lille OSC, winning Ligue 1 titles with the third and fourth clubs.
