= Hernán Pellerano =

Argentine footballer

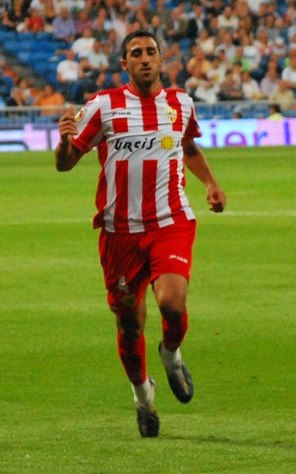
- Pellerano with Almería in 2011

Personal information
- Full name: Hernán Darío Pellerano
- Date of birth: 4 June 1984 (age 42)
- Place of birth: Buenos Aires, Argentina
- Height: 1.83 m (6 ft 0 in)
- Position: Centre-back

Team information
- Current team: Gimnasia Jujuy (manager)

Youth career
- Vélez Sarsfield

Senior career*
Years	Team	Apps	(Gls)
2003–2008	Vélez Sarsfield	117	(2)
2008–2013	Almería	95	(2)
2011–2012	→ Newell's Old Boys (loan)	33	(1)
2014	Tijuana	30	(0)
2015	Vélez Sarsfield	13	(0)
2015–2016	Independiente	34	(0)
2017	Olimpia	34	(1)
2018–2019	LDU	22	(1)
2020	Melgar	15	(1)
2021–2022	San Martín Tucumán	58	(0)
2023–2024	Gimnasia Jujuy	37	(0)
Total		488	(8)

Managerial career
- 2025–: Gimnasia Jujuy
- * Club domestic league appearances and goals

Hernán Darío Pellerano (born 4 June 1984) is an Argentine football manager and former professional player who played as a centre-back. He is the current manager of Gimnasia Jujuy.

== Club career ==
=== Vélez ===
Born in Buenos Aires, Pellerano made his senior debut in 2003 for Club Atlético Vélez Sarsfield, going on to quickly establish himself as an important first-team element. In 2005, he was part of the squad that won the Clausura, even though he was a substitute for Fabricio Fuentes and Maximiliano Pellegrino (he played only one game as a starter).

Pellerano became a regular after the former's departure, appearing in 15 matches in the 2005 Apertura tournament.

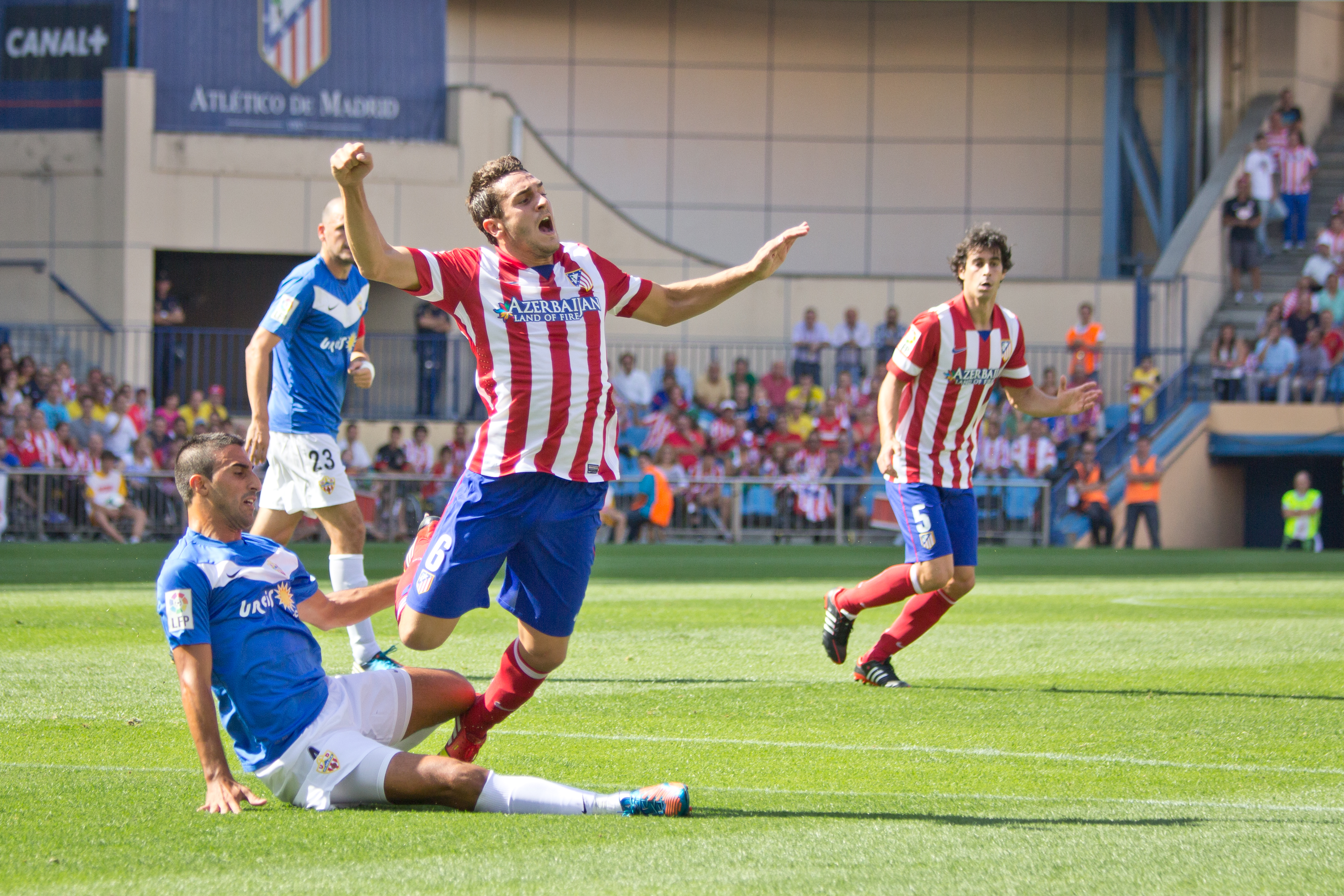
Pellerano challenging Koke in a match against Atlético Madrid in September 2013.

=== Almería ===
In the 2008–09 season, Pellerano moved abroad, signing with UD Almería for a fee of around €3 million. He scored on his official debut for the Andalusians, a 3–1 La Liga away win against Athletic Bilbao on 31 August 2008, and was a regular starter in his first campaign.

Pellerano struggled heavily with injury in the following years, making just eight league appearances in 2010–11 as the club eventually finished 20th and last. He returned to his country for the following season, agreeing to a loan deal at Newell's Old Boys.

=== Tijuana / Return to Argentina ===
In 2014, Pellerano joined Club Tijuana of the Liga MX, where he shared teams with his brother Cristian. After one year in Mexico, he returned to Vélez for the 2015 campaign.

On 11 July 2015, Pellerano transferred to Club Atlético Independiente.

== International career ==
In 2006, Pellerano was part of an Argentina-based national squad picked by Alfio Basile to train for the 2007 Copa América. However, he was not finally called for the tournament's final stages.

== Personal life ==
Pellerano's older brother, Cristian, was also a professional footballer. They were teammates at Club Tijuana.

== Honours ==
=== Club ===
Vélez Sarsfield

- Argentine Primera División: 2005 Clausura

LDU

- Ecuadorian Serie A: 2018
