= 2011–12 UD Almería season =

UD Almería
2011–12 season
- President: Alfonso García
- Head coach: Lucas Alcaraz (until 3 April); Esteban Vigo (from 4 April)
- Stadium: Juegos Mediterráneos
- Segunda División: 7th
- Copa del Rey: Round of 32
- Top goalscorer: League: Leonardo Ulloa (28); All: Leonardo Ulloa (29)
Home colours	Away colours	Third colours

Is the 2011–12 UD Almería season. The club plays in two tournaments: the Segunda División and the Copa del Rey. It is the first season since the club had been relegated from La Liga.

== Squad ==
Retrieved on 2 September 2011

Note: Flags indicate national team as defined under FIFA eligibility rules; some limited exceptions apply. Players may hold more than one non-FIFA nationality.

No.	Pos.	Nation	Player
1	GK	ESP	Esteban
2	DF	DEN	Michael Jakobsen
5	MF	ARG	Hernán Bernardello
6	MF	ESP	Fernando Soriano
7	MF	ESP	Verza
8	FW	ESP	Aleix Vidal
9	FW	ESP	Aarón Ñíguez
10	MF	ESP	José Ortiz (captain)
11	FW	SWE	Henok Goitom

No.	Pos.	Nation	Player
13	GK	ESP	Diego
15	MF	ESP	Corona
16	DF	BRA	Michel
17	FW	ESP	Juanma Ortiz
18	DF	PER	Santi Acasiete (vice-captain)
20	DF	ESP	Rafita
21	DF	ESP	Carlos García
23	FW	ARG	Leonardo Ulloa
24	DF	ESP	Dani Bautista

=== Youth team players ===
Note: Flags indicate national team as defined under FIFA eligibility rules; some limited exceptions apply. Players may hold more than one non-FIFA nationality.

No.	Pos.	Nation	Player
27	GK	AUT	Pirmin Strasser
28	DF	ESP	Pedro Alcalá
29	DF	ESP	Ángel Trujillo
30	MF	ESP	Alberto
32	MF	ESP	Cristóbal
33	FW	ESP	Pallarès
34	GK	ESP	Lopito

No.	Pos.	Nation	Player
35	MF	ESP	García Márquez
36	MF	URU	Sebastián Rodríguez
38	DF	ESP	Rubén Primo
39	FW	ESP	Abel Molinero
40	DF	ESP	Lillo
43	FW	BFA	Jonathan

== Transfers ==
=== In ===
#	Pos	Player	From	Type
20	DF	(Spain) Rafita	(Spain) Recreativo	Transfer
24	DF	(Spain) Dani Bautista	(Spain) Girona	Transfer
6	MF	(Spain) Fernando Soriano	(Spain) Osasuna	Transfer
7	MF	(Spain) Verza	(Spain) Albacete	Transfer
14	MF	(Spain) Omar	(Spain) Tenerife	Loan
9	FW	(Spain) Aarón Ñíguez	(Spain) Valencia	Transfer
8	FW	(Spain) Aleix Vidal	(Spain) Mallorca B	Transfer
17	MF	(Spain) Juanma Ortiz	(Scotland) Rangers	Loan

=== Out ===
#	Pos	Player	To	Type
1	GK	(Brazil) Diego Alves	(Spain) Valencia	Transfer
4	DF	(Argentina) Hernán Pellerano	(Argentina) Newell's Old Boys	Loan
14	DF	(Spain) Antonio Luna	(Spain) Sevilla	Loan Return
7	MF	(Spain) Miguel Ángel Nieto	(Spain) Numancia	Transfer
8	MF	(Spain) Albert Crusat	(England) Wigan Athletic	Transfer
17	MF	(Spain) Juanma Ortiz	(Scotland) Rangers	Transfer
19	MF	(Cameroon) Modeste M'bami	(China) Changchun Yatai	Transfer
22	MF	(Colombia) Fabián Vargas	(Greece) AEK Athens	Transfer
24	MF	(Spain) Juanito	(Greece) Asteras Tripolis	Transfer
26	MF	(Spain) Miguel Ángel Luque	(Spain) Atlético Madrid B	Trandfer
5	FW	(Nigeria) Kalu Uche	(Switzerland) Neuchâtel Xamax	Transfer
7	FW	(France) Sofiane Feghouli	(Spain) Valencia	Loan Return
11	FW	(Argentina) Pablo Piatti	(Spain) Valencia	Transfer
3	DF	(Uruguay) Marcelo Silva	(Uruguay) Peñarol	Loan
14	MF	(Spain) Omar	(Spain) Tenerife	Loan Return

== Player statistics ==
=== Squad stats ===
Last updated on 5 June 2012.

No.	Pos	Nat	Player	Total		Liga Adelante		Copa del Rey	
No.	Pos	Nat	Player	Apps	Goals	Apps	Goals	Apps	Goals
1	GK	(Spain) ESP	Esteban	42	0	42	0	0	0
2	DF	(Denmark) DEN	Michael Jakobsen	40	1	38	1	2	0
5	MF	(Argentina) ARG	Hernán Bernardello	35	1	32	1	3	0
6	MF	(Spain) ESP	Fernando Soriano	38	6	34	4	4	2
7	MF	(Spain) ESP	Verza	41	1	38	1	3	0
8	FW	(Spain) ESP	Aleix	42	5	40	5	2	0
9	FW	(Spain) ESP	Aarón Ñíguez	33	3	30	3	3	0
10	MF	(Spain) ESP	José Ortiz	13	1	10	1	3	0
11	FW	(Sweden) SWE	Henok Goitom	34	7	31	6	3	1
13	GK	(Spain) ESP	Diego García	4	0	0	0	4	0
15	MF	(Spain) ESP	Corona	45	3	41	3	4	0
16	DF	(Brazil) BRA	Michel	25	0	22	0	3	0
17	MF	(Spain) ESP	Juanma Ortiz	16	4	16	4	0	0
18	DF	(Peru) PER	Santi Acasiete	22	1	20	1	2	0
20	DF	(Spain) ESP	Rafita	37	1	34	1	3	0
21	DF	(Spain) ESP	Carlos García	38	0	37	0	1	0
23	FW	(Argentina) ARG	Leonardo Ulloa	40	29	38	28	2	1
24	DF	(Spain) ESP	Dani Bautista	25	1	23	1	2	0
27	GK	(Austria) AUT	Primin Strasser	0	0	0	0	0	0
28	DF	(Spain) ESP	Pedro Alcalá	0	0	0	0	0	0
29	DF	(Spain) ESP	Trujillo	2	0	2	0	0	0
30	MF	(Spain) ESP	Alberto M.R.	1	0	1	0	0	0
32	MF	(Spain) ESP	Cristóbal	0	0	0	0	0	0
33	FW	(Spain) ESP	Pallarès	13	0	11	0	2	0
34	GK	(Spain) ESP	Lopito	0	0	0	0	0	0
35	MF	(Spain) ESP	García Márquez	1	0	1	0	0	0
38	DF	(Spain) ESP	Rubén Primo	1	0	0	0	1	0
39	FW	(Spain) ESP	Abel Molinero	5	0	4	0	1	0
40	DF	(Spain) ESP	Lillo	0	0	0	0	0	0
43	FW	(Burkina Faso) BFA	Jonathan	14	2	13	2	1	0
Players who have left the club after the start of the season:
3	DF	(Uruguay) URU	Marcelo Silva	6	1	2	0	4	1
14	MF	(Spain) ESP	Omar	11	0	8	0	3	0

=== Top scorers ===
Updated on 5 June

Place	Position	Nation	Number	Name	Liga Adelante	Copa del Rey	Total
1	FW	(Argentina)	23	Leonardo Ulloa	28	1	29
2	FW	(Sweden)	11	Henok Goitom	6	1	7
2	MF	(Spain)	6	Fernando Soriano	4	2	6
3	FW	(Spain)	8	Aleix	5	0	5
4	MF	(Spain)	17	Juanma Ortiz	4	0	4
5	MF	(Spain)	9	Aarón Ñíguez	3	0	3
5	MF	(Spain)	15	Corona	3	0	3
6	FW	(Burkina Faso)	43	Jonathan	2	0	2
7	DF	(Denmark)	2	Michael Jakobsen	1	0	1
7	DF	(Uruguay)	3	Marcelo Silva	0	1	1
7	MF	(Argentina)	5	Hernán Bernardello	1	0	1
7	MF	(Spain)	7	Verza	1	0	1
7	MF	(Spain)	10	José Ortiz	1	0	1
7	DF	(Peru)	18	Santiago Acasiete	1	0	1
7	DF	(Spain)	20	Rafita	1	0	1
7	DF	(Spain)	24	Dani Bautista	1	0	1
				TOTALS	63	5	68

=== Disciplinary record ===
Updated on 27 May

Number	Nation	Position	Name	Liga Adelante		Copa del Rey		Total	
Number	Nation	Position	Name	Yellow card	Red card	Yellow card	Red card	Yellow card	Red card
21	(Spain)	DF	Carlos García	15	0	0	0	15	0
6	(Spain)	MF	Fernando Soriano	12	0	0	0	12	0
5	(Argentina)	MF	Hernán Bernardello	9	2	2	0	11	2
20	(Spain)	DF	Rafita	11	0	0	0	11	0
15	(Spain)	MF	Corona	10	0	1	0	11	0
7	(Spain)	MF	Verza	10	1	0	0	10	1
2	(Denmark)	DF	Michael Jakobsen	9	0	1	0	10	0
23	(Argentina)	FW	Leonardo Ulloa	8	2	0	0	8	2
17	(Spain)	MF	Juanma Ortiz	6	0	0	0	6	0
24	(Spain)	DF	Dani Bautista	4	0	1	1	5	1
8	(Spain)	FW	Aleix	5	0	0	0	5	0
16	(Brazil)	DF	Michel	5	0	0	0	5	0
11	(Sweden)	FW	Henok Goitom	4	0	0	0	4	0
3	(Uruguay)	DF	Marcelo Silva	1	1	2	0	3	1
1	(Spain)	GK	Esteban	3	0	0	0	3	0
9	(Spain)	MF	Aarón Ñíguez	3	0	0	0	3	0
10	(Spain)	MF	José Ortiz	0	0	2	1	2	1
18	(Peru)	DF	Santi Acasiete	2	0	0	0	2	0
14	(Spain)	MF	Omar	1	0	1	0	2	0
38	(Spain)	DF	Rubén Primo	0	0	1	1	1	1
29	(Spain)	DF	Ángel Trujillo	1	0	0	0	1	0
33	(Spain)	FW	Pallarès	1	0	0	0	1	0
39	(Spain)	FW	Abel Molinero	1	0	0	0	1	0
43	(Burkina Faso)	FW	Jonathan	1	0	0	0	1	0
			TOTALS	120	6	12	3	132	9

== Season results ==
=== Segunda División ===
Pos	Team	Pld	W	D	L	GF	GA	GD	Pts	Promotion, qualification or relegation
5	Hércules	42	22	6	14	62	43	+19	72	Qualification to promotion play-offs
6	Córdoba	42	20	11	11	52	43	+9	71	Qualification to promotion play-offs
7	Almería	42	18	16	8	63	43	+20	70	
8	Barcelona B	42	16	11	15	63	53	+10	59	
9	Las Palmas	42	16	10	16	58	59	−1	58	

Source: LFP - Liga Adelante
Rules for classification: 1st points; 2nd head-to-head points; 3rd head-to-head goal difference; 4th head-to-head goals scored; 5th goal difference; 6th number of goals scored; 7th Fair-play points

==== Results summary ====
Overall								Home						Away					
Pld	W	D	L	GF	GA	GD	Pts	W	D	L	GF	GA	GD	W	D	L	GF	GA	GD
42	18	16	8	63	43	+20	70	11	8	2	35	17	+18	7	8	6	28	26	+2

Last updated: 5 June 2012.
Source: LFP – Liga Adelante

=== Competitive ===
==== Preseason ====
22 July 2011	Águilas	0–3	Almería	Águilas, Spain
21:00		Report	57' (o.g.) Emilio; 58' Ortiz; 89' Crusat	Stadium: El Rubial; Attendance: 700; Referee: Hernández Ferrer

29 July 2011	Comarca Níjar	0–3	Almería	Níjar, Spain
21:00		Report	55' Ulloa; 58' Crusat; 72' Aleix	Stadium: Municipal; Attendance: 700; Referee: Borja Belmonte

3 August 2011	Murcia	2–2	Almería	Lorca, Spain
21:00	Kike 6'; Sutil 88'	Report	43' 55' Goitom	Stadium: Francisco Artés Carrasco; Attendance: 1000+ Referee: Melgares

6 August 2011	Granada	1–1	Almería	La Manga, Spain
19:00	Mainz (red card) 57'; Boateng 89'	Report	20' Ulloa	Stadium: La Manga Club; Attendance: 1000

9 August 2011	Roquetas	0–1	Almería	Roquetas de Mar, Spain
18:00		Report	19' Michel	Stadium: Antonio Peroles; Referee: Raúl Chavet

11 August 2011 Trofeo Carabela de Plata	Cartagena	1–2	Almería	Cartagena, Spain
21:30	Álvaro Antón 37'	Report	51' 53' Ulloa	Stadium: Cartagonova; Attendance: 5,404; Referee: José María Sánchez Martínez

14 August 2011 Trofeo Memorial; Juan Rojas	Almería	0–0 (3–1 p)	Valencia	Almería, Spain
19:00	Soriano (yellow card) 32'	Report	(yellow card) 12' Miguel; (yellow card) 51' Parejo; (red card) 80' Aduriz	Stadium: Juegos Mediterráneos; Attendance: 4,813; Referee: José María Sánchez Martínez
	Penalties
	Verza (penalty scored); Corona (penalty missed); Rafita (penalty scored); Dani Bautista (penalty scored)		(penalty missed) Soldado; (penalty missed) Tino Costa; (penalty scored) Bruno; (penalty missed) Rami

==== Segunda División ====
27 August 2011 Round 2	Córdoba	1–1	Almería	Córdoba, Spain
20:00	Pepe Díaz (yellow card) 15'; Charles 52'; Tena (yellow card) 62'; David Prieto (yellow card) 87'	Report	5' Ulloa; (yellow card) 7' Marcelo Silva; (yellow card) 44' Aleix; (yellow card) 56' Carlos García; (yellow card) 63' Rafita; (yellow card) 89' Soriano	Stadium: Nuevo Arcángel; Referee: López Acera

3 September 2011 Round 3	Almería	2–2	Girona	Almería, Spain
18:00	Dani Bautista 39'; Ulloa 44'; Carlos García (yellow card) 49'; Michel (yellow card) 86'; Soriano (yellow card) 87'	Report	(yellow card) 19' Dorca; (red card) 44' José; 49' Saizar; (yellow card) 71' Tébar; (yellow card) 83' Benja; 89' Moha	Stadium: Estadio de los Juegos Mediterráneos; Referee: Gil Manzano

10 September 2011 Round 4	Murcia	0–2	Almería	Murcia, Spain
18:00	Óscar Sánchez (yellow card) 43'; Galder Cerrajería (yellow card) 51'; Jorge (yellow card) 81'	Report	7' Jakobsen; (yellow card) 39' Bernardello; (yellow card) 44' Verza; 49' Aleix; (red card) 70' Ulloa; (yellow card) 79' Soriano; (yellow card) 89' Carlos García	Stadium: Nueva Condomina; Referee: Jaime Latre

18 September 2011 Round 5	Almería	1–0	Celta	Almería, Spain
12:00	Bernardello (yellow card) 26' (goal) 74'; Jakobsen (yellow card) 36'; Carlos García (yellow card) 40'	Report	(yellow card) 33' Catalá; (yellow card) 58' Natxo Insa; (yellow card) 68' Toni; (yellow card) 70' Bustos	Stadium: Estadio de los Juegos Mediterráneos; Referee: Miranda Torres

23 September 2011 Round 6	Elche	1–3	Almería	Elche, Spain
21:00	Acciari (yellow card) 9'; Etxeita (red card) 88'; Linares 89'	Report	1' Ulloa; (yellow card) 32' Dani Bautista; 47' Rafita; (red card) 67' Verza; (yellow card) 69' Bernardello; (yellow card) 82' Michel	Stadium: Manuel Martínez Valero; Referee: José María Sánchez Martínez

1 October 2011 Round 7	Recreativo	0–1	Almería	Huelva, Spain
18:00	Villar (yellow card) 68'; Javi Álamo (yellow card) 72'; Manolo Martínez (yellow card) 85'	Report	27' Ulloa; (yellow card) 75' Corona; (yellow card) 84' Goitom	Stadium: Nuevo Colombino; Referee: Amoedo Chas

9 October 2011 Round 8	Almería	1–1	Valladolid	Almería, Spain
20:00	Carlos García (yellow card) 30'; Corona 38'; Ulloa (yellow card) 54'; Rafita (yellow card) 67'	Report	(yellow card) 37' Balenziaga; (yellow card) 76' Tekio; (yellow card) 88' Baraja; (yellow card) 88' (goal) 89' Javi Guerra	Stadium: Estadio de los Juegos Mediterráneos; Referee: Ocón Arráiz

15 October 2011 Round 9	Numancia	1–0	Almería	Huelva, Spain
18:00	Nagore 40'; Cedric (yellow card) 68'; Jaio (yellow card) 87'	Report	(red card) 38' Marcelo Silva; (yellow card) 49' Jakobsen; (yellow card) 52' Ulloa (red card) 73' Bernardello; (yellow card) 89' Dani Bautista	Stadium: Nuevo Colombino; Referee: Amoedo Chas

23 October 2011 Round 10	Almería	1–1	Las Palmas	Almería, Spain
20:00	Aleix 47'	Report	(yellow card) 55' Herner; (yellow card) 77' Pignol; 90+4' Laguardia	Stadium: Estadio de los Juegos Mediterráneos; Referee: Piñeiro Crespo

26 October 2011 Round 1	Almería	3–1	Gimnàstic	Almería, Spain
18:00	Ulloa 12' (pen.) 31'; Soriano 53'; Verza (yellow card) 57'	Report	(yellow card) 11' Rodri; 27' Morán	Stadium: Estadio de los Juegos Mediterráneos; Referee: Hernández Hernández

29 October 2011 Round 11	Xerez	0–1	Almería	Jerez de la Frontera, Spain
18:00	Robusté (yellow card) 18'; P. Redondo (yellow card) 32'; Rueda (yellow card) 35'; Mendoza (yellow card) 61'; D. Lombán (yellow card) 90'	Report	(yellow card) 37' Bernardello; (yellow card) 66' Jakobsen; 77' Soriano; (yellow card) 87' Michel	Stadium: Municipal de Chapín; Referee: Prieto Iglesias

5 November 2011 Round 12	Almería	2–1	Huesca	Almería, Spain
18:00	Ulloa 14' 64'; Carlos García (yellow card) 38'; Jakobsen (yellow card) 84'	Report	(yellow card) 29' (goal) 84' Camacho; (yellow card) 31' S. Corona; (yellow card) 44' Sorribas; (yellow card) 64' Cabrero	Stadium: Estadio de los Juegos Mediterráneos; Referee: Arcediano Monescillo

13 November 2011 Round 13	Villarreal B	2–1	Almería	Villarreal, Spain
16:00	Castellani (yellow card) 16'; Joselu (yellow card) 25' (goal) 57' 89' (pen.); Florian (yellow card) 32'; Toribio (yellow card) 51'; Pedro Vázquez (yellow card) 53'; Iriome (yellow card) 77'	Report	18' Ulloa; (yellow card) 40' Bernardello; (yellow card) 42' Rafita; (yellow card) 73' Michel; (yellow card) 89' Dani Bautista	Stadium: Ciudad Deportiva; Referee: Miranda Torres

20 November 2011 Round 14	Almería	0–0	Cartagena	Almería, Spain
20:00	Aleix (yellow card) 43'	Report	(yellow card) 53' Julien; (yellow card) 78' Cléber; (yellow card) 89' Abraham Paz	Stadium: Estadio de los Juegos Mediterráneos; Referee: Arias López

25 November 2011 Round 15	Deportivo	3–1	Almería	A Coruña, Spain
21:00	Ayoze (yellow card) 40'; Alex Bergantiños (yellow card) 42'; Guardado 44'; Juan Domínguez 48'; Lassad (yellow card) 51' (goal) 57'	Report	(yellow card) 27' Esteban; (yellow card) 44' Verza; (yellow card) 44' Carlos García; (yellow card) 55' Jakobsen; (yellow card) 55' Dani Bautista; (yellow card) 65' (goal) 88' Ulloa; (yellow card) 81' Goitom	Stadium: Riazor; Referee: Valdés Aller

3 December 2011 Round 16	Almería	1–1	Hércules	Almería, Spain
18:00	Ulloa 31'; Corona (yellow card) 53'; Soriano (yellow card) 70'	Report	35' Carlos Calvo; (yellow card) 53' Samuel	Stadium: Estadio de los Juegos Mediterráneos; Referee: Bikandi Garrido

9 December 2011 Round 17	Barcelona B	3–3	Almería	Barcelona, Spain
	Jonathan Soriano 44'; Rodri (yellow card) 58'; Carmona (yellow card) 69'; Riverola (yellow card) 76' (goal) 78'; Tello 82'	Report	(yellow card) 31' (goal) 54' 68' Soriano; 89' Aarón	Stadium: Mini Estadi; Referee: Arcediano Monescillo

18 December 2011 Round 18	Almería	3–0	Sabadell	Almería, Spain
19:45	Goitom 33' 44'; Corona (yellow card) 70'; Ulloa 83'	Report	(yellow card) 22' Héctor Simón; (yellow card) 27' Redondo; (yellow card) 58' Fran Piera; (yellow card) 79' Pablo Ruiz	Stadium: Estadio de los Juegos Mediterráneos; Referee: Amoedo Chas

8 January 2012 Round 19	Alcorcón	1–1	Almería	Alcorcón, Spain
12:00	Michel (yellow card) 30'; Ulloa 37'; Corona (yellow card) 57'; Soriano (yellow card) 82'	Report	(yellow card) 24' Sergio Mora; (yellow card) 36' Borja; 57' Quini; (yellow card) 88' Bermúdez	Stadium: Santo Domingo; Referee: Ricardo de Burgos Bengoetxea

14 January 2012 Round 20	Almería	4–0	Guadalajara	Almería, Spain
16:00	Soriano (yellow card) 15'; Ulloa 27' 36' 77'; Goitom 72'; Omar (yellow card) 89'	Report	(yellow card) 19' A. Moreno; (yellow card) 26' Jony; (yellow card) 36' Gaffoor; (yellow card) 86' Víctor Fdez.	Stadium: Estadio de los Juegos Mediterráneos; Referee: Jaime Latre

21 January 2012 Round 21	Alcoyano	2–2	Almería	Alcoy, Spain
	César Remón (yellow card) 52'; Gato 57'; Wellington Silva 85'	Report	8' Ulloa; (yellow card) 56' Rafita; 61' Goitom; (yellow card) 68' Verza; (yellow card) 70' Jakobsen; (yellow card) 75' Soriano; (yellow card) 89' Aarón	Stadium: El Collao; Referee: Ocón Arráiz

28 January 2012 Round 22	Gimnàstic	1–2	Almería	Tarragona
19:45	Dani Abalo (yellow card) 6'; Mingo (yellow card) 39'; Powel 50'	Report	(yellow card) 16' Rafita; 40' Verza; (yellow card) 49' Carlos García; (yellow card) 70' Acasiete; 89' Aleix	Stadium: Nou Estadi; Referee: Gil Manzano

4 February 2012 Round 23	Almería	2–1	Córdoba	Almería, Spain
18:00	Ulloa (yellow card) 34'; Carlos García (yellow card) 61'; Corona 70'; Ortiz (yellow card) 88' (goal) 89'	Report	39' (yellow card) 74' Borja; (yellow card) 47' Patiño; (yellow card) 55' Carlos Caballero	Stadium: Estadio de los Juegos Mediterráneos; Referee: Valdés Aller

11 February 2012 Round 24	Girona	0–1	Almería	Girona, Spain
16:00		Report	78' Juanma Ortiz	Stadium: Montilivi; Referee: Bikandi Garrido

18 February 2012 Round 25	Almería	4–2	Murcia	Almería, Spain
18:00	Goitom (yellow card) 16'; Juanma Ortiz 18' (yellow card) 74'; Corona 41'; Soriano (yellow card) 51'; Jorge 57' (o.g.); Ulloa 67'; Aleix (yellow card) 69'	Report	13' Molinero; (yellow card) 37' Óscar Sánchez; (yellow card) 40' Oriol; 89' Pedro	Stadium: Estadio de los Juegos Mediterráneos; Referee: Lesma López

26 February 2012 Round 26	Celta	4–3	Almería	Vigo, Spain
12:00	de Lucas 11' (yellow card) 37'; Oier (yellow card) 53'; Orellana (yellow card) 53'; Mario Bermejo 58' 78'; Joan Tomás 63'	Report	9' (red card) 90' Ulloa; 29' (yellow card) 37' Juanma Ortiz; (yellow card) 58' Jakobsen; (yellow card) 77' Verza; 81' Aleix; (yellow card) 89' Bernardello	Stadium: Balaídos; Referee: Pino Zamorano

4 March 2012 Round 27	Almería	0–2	Elche	Almería, Spain
12:00	Goitom (yellow card) 45'; Rafita (yellow card) 45'; Jonathan (yellow card) 89'	Report	(yellow card) 18' Generelo; (yellow card) 36' Pelegrín; 38' Béranger; (yellow card) 45' Etxeita; 56' Xumetra; (yellow card) 76' Javier Flaño	Stadium: Estadio de los Juegos Mediterráneos; Referee: Prieto Iglesias

10 March 2012 Round 28	Almería	2–2	Recreativo	Almería, Spain
18:00	Goitom 35'; Ulloa 60'; Carlos García (yellow card) 72'	Report	42' Bord; (yellow card) 44' (goal) 52' Aitor	Stadium: Estadio de los Juegos Mediterráneos; Referee: Gil Manzano

18 March 2012 Round 29	Valladolid	1–1	Almería	Valladolid, Spain
12:00	Víctor Pérez 19'; Jesús Rueda (yellow card) 89'	Report	(yellow card) 18' Trujillo; (yellow card) 44' Corona; 49' Ulloa; (yellow card) 59' Juanma Ortiz; (yellow card) 77' Soriano	Stadium: José Zorrilla; Referee: Sureda Cuenca

24 March 2012 Round 31	Las Palmas	2–2	Almería	Las Palmas de Gran Canaria, Spain
17:30	David García (yellow card) 36' (goal) 78'; Javi Guerrero 63'; Laguardia (yellow card) 82'; Jonathan Viera (yellow card) 84'; Javi Castellano (yellow card) 89'	Report	(yellow card) 33' Verza; 47' 69' Ulloa; (yellow card) 65' Abel; (yellow card) 66' Esteban; (yellow card) 82' Juanma Ortiz; (yellow card) 84' Acasiete	Stadium: Gran Canaria; Referee: Lesma López

31 March 2012 Round 32	Almería	1–1	Xerez	Almería, Spain
18:00	Verza (yellow card) 28'; Corona (yellow card) 39'; Carlos García (yellow card) 61'; Ulloa 73'; Rafita (yellow card) 88'	Report	3' José Mari; (yellow card) 11' Raúl Cámara; (yellow card) 37' Mendoza; (yellow card) 43' Rueda; (yellow card) 49' Bruno Herrero; (yellow card) 57' Robusté	Stadium: Estadio de los Juegos Mediterráneos; Referee: López Acera

7 April 2012 Round 33	Huesca	1–0	Almería	Huesca, Spain
18:00	S. Corona (yellow card) 31'; Omar 55' (yellow card) 89'; David Vázquez (yellow card) 81'	Report	(yellow card) 39' Rafita; (yellow card) 43' Ulloa; (yellow card) 83' Verza; (yellow card) 88' Carlos García	Stadium: El Alcoraz; Referee: Prieto Iglesias

13 April 2012 Round 34	Almería	0–0	Villarreal B	Almería, Spain
21:00	Pallarès (yellow card) 75'	Report	(yellow card) 54' Iriome; (yellow card) 56' Llorente	Stadium: Estadio de los Juegos Mediterráneos; Referee: Arcediano Monescillo

21 April 2012 Round 35	Cartagena	1–1	Almería	Cartagena, Spain
16:00	Font (yellow card) 22'; Raimondi (yellow card) 67'; Mariano Sánchez (yellow card) 72'; Braulio 89'	Report	(yellow card) 1' Jakobsen; 50' Aleix; (yellow card) 76' Carlos García; (yellow card) 85' Rafita; (yellow card) 87' Esteban	Stadium: Cartagonova; Referee: Hernández Hernández

28 April 2012 Round 36	Almería	2–0	Deportivo	Almería, Spain
18:00	Ulloa 40'; Corona (yellow card) 53'; Aarón 86'; Bernardello (yellow card) 89'	Report	(yellow card) 59' Bruno Gama; (red card) 89' Colotto	Stadium: Estadio de los Juegos Mediterráneos; Referee: Sureda Cuenca

5 May 2012 Round 37	Hércules	0–0	Almería	Alicante, Spain
18:00	Paco Peña (yellow card) 36'; Urko Vera (yellow card) 52'; Escassi (yellow card) 82'	Report	(yellow card) 20' Ulloa; (yellow card) 21' Juanma Ortiz; (yellow card) 66' Aleix	Stadium: José Rico Pérez; Referee: Jaime Latre

12 May 2012 Round 38	Almería	1–2	Barcelona B	Almería, Spain
16:00	Corona (yellow card) 21'; Carlos García (yellow card) 44'; Soriano (yellow card) 60'; Dani Bautista (yellow card) 81'; Ortiz 89'	Report	(yellow card) 19' Muniesa; 31' (yellow card) 60' Sergi Roberto; 43' Gerard; (yellow card) 84' Masip	Stadium: Estadio de los Juegos Mediterráneos; Referee: Pino Zamorano

16 May 2012 Round 39	Sabadell	2–1	Almería	Alicante, Spain
20:00	Samuel (yellow card) 17'; Aarón Bueno 19'; Baha 22'; Toni Lao (yellow card) 63'	Report	(yellow card) 44' Aleix; 64' (yellow card) 73' Ulloa; (yellow card) 88' Jakobsen; (yellow card) 89' Carlos García	Stadium: José Rico Pérez; Referee: Piñeiro Crespo

19 May 2012 Round 40	Almería	2–0	Alcorcón	Almería, Spain
18:00	Aarón (yellow card) 15'; Jonathan 75' 89'	Report	(yellow card) 32' Rubén Sanz; (yellow card) 49' Ángel; (yellow card) 58' Agus; (yellow card) 89' Carlos Martínez	Stadium: Estadio de los Juegos Mediterráneos; Referee: Juan Martínez Munuera

24 May 2012 Round 30	Almería	2–0	Numancia	Almería, Spain
20:00	Acasiete 8'; Ulloa 25'; Rafita (yellow card) 28'; Verza (yellow card) 89'	Report	(yellow card) 37' Nano; (yellow card) 70' Iván Malón	Stadium: Estadio de los Juegos Mediterráneos; Referee: Arias López

26 May 2012 Round 41	Guadalajara	0–1	Almería	Guadalajara, Spain
20:00	Antonio Moreno (yellow card) 33'; Gerard Badía (yellow card) 43'; Rodri (yellow card) 52'; Jony (yellow card) 69'	Report	Hernán Bernardello (yellow card) 42' (yellow-red card) 74'; Aarón Ñíguez 58' (yellow card) 89'; Soriano (yellow card) 68'; Corona (yellow card) 85'	Stadium: Pedro Escartín; Referee: Ricardo de Burgos Bengoetxea

2 June 2012 Round 42	Almería	1–0	Alcoyano	Almería, Spain
19:30	Ulloa 16'	Report	(yellow card) 40' Diego Jiménez; (yellow card) 60' Carrión; (yellow card) 87' Morcillo	Stadium: Estadio de los Juegos Mediterráneos; Referee: Gil Manzano

==== Copa del Rey ====
7 September 2011 Second Round	Almería	2–0 (a.e.t.)	Guadalajara	Almería
21:00 CEST	Jakobsen (yellow card) 49'; Corona (yellow card) 68'; Soriano 115'; Bernardello (yellow card) 117'; Ulloa 119'	(Report)	(yellow card) 32' Gaffoor; (yellow card) 46' Gago; (yellow card) 52' David Fernández; (yellow card) 61' Víctor Fernández; (red card) 117' Javi Soria; (yellow card) 83' Arriaga	Stadium: Juegos del Mediterráneo; Attendance: 4,447; Referee: Pedro Sureda Cuenca

12 October 2011 Third Round	Almería	1–0	Elche	Almería
20:00 CEST	Marcelo Silva (yellow card) 33'; Ortiz (yellow card) 60'; Rubén (red card) 73'; Omar (yellow card) 76'; Soriano 89'	(Report)	(yellow card) 32' Javier Flaño; (yellow card) 52' Béranger; (red card) 63' Rúper; (yellow card) 61' Palanca; (yellow card) 89' Acciari	Stadium: Juegos del Mediterráneo; Attendance: 3,238; Referee: Alfonso Pino Zamorano

13 December 2011 Round of 32	Almería	1–3	Osasuna	Almería
21:00	Marcelo Silva (yellow card) 21' (goal) 74'; Dani Bautista (yellow card) 58' (red card) 58'; Rafita (yellow card) 87'; Ortiz (red card) 89'	Report	14' Lekić; 29' (yellow card) 59' Nekounam; (yellow card) 32' Miguel Flaño; 39' (yellow card) 49' Annunziata	Stadium: Juegos del Mediterráneo; Referee: Pérez Lasa

21 December 2011 Round of 32	Osasuna	1–1	Almería	Pamplona
21:00	Calleja (yellow card) 59'; Lamah 79'	Report	(yellow card) 75' Bernardello; 85' Goitom	Stadium: Reyno de Navarra; Referee: Del Cerro Grande
