= 2013–14 UD Almería season =

UD Almería
2013–14 season
- President: Alfonso García
- Head coach: Francisco Rodríguez
- Stadium: Juegos Mediterráneos
- La Liga: 17th
- Copa del Rey: Round of 16
- Top goalscorer: League: Rodri (8); Verza (8); All: Rodri (8); Verza (8)
Home colours	Away colours	Third colours

In the 2013–14 UD Almería season the club played in two tournaments: the La Liga and the Copa del Rey. The club returns to the top flight of Spanish football after two seasons in absence, after defeating Girona in 2013 Segunda División play-offs, on 22 June.

== Players ==
=== Squad ===
As of 18 May 2014

No.	Name	Pos.	Nat.	Place of Birth	Date of Birth (Age)	Club caps	Club goals	Int. caps	Int. goals	Signed from	Date signed	Fee	Contract End
Goalkeepers
1	Esteban	GK	(Spain) (Asturias)	Avilés	27 June 1975 (aged 38)	154	0	–	–	Celta	4 July 2008	Free	30 June 2014
25	Julián Cuesta	GK	(Spain) (Andalusia)	Campotéjar	28 March 1991 (aged 23)	–	–	–	–	Sevilla	21 January 2014	Loan	30 June 2014
Defenders
2	Marco Torsiglieri	CB/LB	(Argentina)	Castelar	12 January 1988 (aged 26)	28	1	–	–	Metalist (Ukraine)	5 August 2013	Loan	30 June 2014
3	Marcelo Silva	CB	(Uruguay)	Mercedes	21 March 1989 (aged 25)	60	3	–	–	Danubio (Uruguay)	23 July 2010	€1.5M	30 June 2016
4	Hans Martínez	CB/DM	(Chile)	Santiago	4 January 1987 (aged 27)	2	0	11	0	Univ. Católica (Chile)	27 December 2013	Loan	30 June 2014
5	Ángel Trujillo	CB	(Spain) (Community of Madrid)	Madrid	8 September 1987 (aged 26)	75	1	–	–	Almería B	8 June 2012	Free	30 June 2017
16	Sebastián Dubarbier	LB/LW	(Argentina)	La Plata	19 February 1986 (aged 28)	28	1	–	–	Córdoba	28 June 2013	Free	30 June 2016
20	Rafita	RB/RW	(Spain) (Balearic Islands)	Palma	18 September 1982 (aged 31)	89	1	–	–	Recreativo	29 July 2011	Free	30 June 2014
21	Mané	LB	(Spain) (Andalusia)	Tarifa	21 December 1981 (aged 32)	116	3	–	–	M. Tel Aviv (Israel)	23 December 2013	Free	30 June 2015
22	Nélson	RB	(Portugal)	Sal (Cape Verde)	10 June 1983 (aged 30)	15	0	4	0	Palermo (Italy)	2 August 2013	Loan	30 June 2014
41	Antonio Marín	RB/CB	(Spain) (Andalusia)	Benalúa	17 June 1996 (aged 17)	1	0	–	–	Almería B	17 December 2013	Free	30 June 2015
44	Fran Vélez	CB/LB	(Spain) (Catalonia)	Tarragona	13 June 1991 (aged 22)	5	1	–	–	Almería B	13 January 2014	Free	30 June 2014
Midfielders
6	Marcos Tébar	DM/CM	(Spain) (Community of Madrid)	Madrid	7 February 1986 (aged 28)	29	0	–	–	Girona	10 July 2013	Free	30 June 2015
7	Verza	DM/CM	(Spain) (Valencian Community)	Orihuela	26 September 1986 (aged 27)	122	11	–	–	Albacete	29 June 2011	Free	30 June 2015
8	Aleix Vidal	LW/RW/AM	(Spain) (Catalonia)	Valls	21 August 1989 (aged 24)	129	19	–	–	Mallorca B	15 June 2011	Free	30 June 2017
11	Hélder Barbosa	LW/RW	(Portugal)	Paredes	25 May 1987 (aged 26)	31	1	1	0	Braga (Portugal)	29 August 2013	Loan	30 June 2014
15	Corona (c)	CM/DM/AM	(Spain) (Castilla–La Mancha)	Talavera	12 February 1981 (aged 33)	276	22	–	–	Zaragoza	11 August 2006	Free	30 June 2014
17	Suso	LW/RW/AM	(Spain) (Andalusia)	Algeciras	19 November 1993 (aged 20)	35	3	–	–	Liverpool (England)	12 July 2013	Loan	30 June 2014
23	Fernando Soriano	CM/AM	(Spain) (Aragon)	Zaragoza	24 September 1979 (aged 34)	270	41	–	–	Osasuna	25 July 2011	Free	30 June 2014
29	Kiu	LW/RW	(South Korea)	Yeongju	5 January 1995 (aged 19)	4	0	–	–	Almería B	1 July 2013	Free	Undisclosed
31	Ramon Azeez	CM/DM	(Nigeria)	Abuja	12 December 1992 (aged 21)	36	2	1	0	Almería B	28 June 2013	Free	30 June 2016
34	Cristóbal	AM	(Spain) (Andalusia)	Málaga	5 February 1992 (aged 22)	2	0	–	–	Almería B	17 December 2013	Free	30 June 2018
Forwards
9	Óscar Díaz	ST/RW	(Spain) (Community of Madrid)	Madrid	24 August 1984 (aged 29)	34	6	–	–	Lugo	28 June 2013	€30K	30 June 2014
10	Rodri	ST	(Spain) (Castile and León)	Soria	6 June 1990 (aged 23)	27	8	–	–	Barcelona B	11 July 2013	Loan	30 June 2014
19	Jonathan	ST/RW	(Burkina Faso)	Ouagadougou	2 December 1992 (aged 21)	66	5	5	0	Almería B	1 August 2011	Free	30 June 2017
27	Hicham	ST	(Morocco)	San Javier (Spain)	7 May 1995 (aged 19)	4	1	–	–	Almería B	17 December 2013	Free	30 June 2018
32	Dani Romera	ST	(Spain) (Andalusia)	Almería	23 August 1995 (aged 18)	1	0	–	–	Almería B	29 November 2013	Free	Undisclosed

=== Transfers ===
==== In ====
No.	Pos.	Nat.	Name	Age	EU	Moving from	Type	Transfer window	Ends	Transfer fee	Source
	DF	(Brazil)	Michel	23	EU	Atlético Mineiro (Brazil)	Loan Return ✓	Summer	2015	Free	
16	MF	(Argentina)	Sebastián Dubarbier	27	EU	Córdoba	Transfer ✓	Summer	2016	Undisclosed	
9	FW	(Spain)	Óscar Díaz	28	EU	Lugo'	Transfer ✓	Summer	2014	€30K	
14	DF	(Spain)	Raúl García	23	EU	Almería B	Promoted ✓	Summer	2015	Free	
12	MF	(Nigeria)	Ramon Azeez	20	Non-EU	Almería B	Promoted ✓	Summer	2016	Free	
		(Spain)	Francisco	35	EU	Almería B	Job Offer ✓	Summer	2014	Free	
6	MF	(Spain)	Marcos Tébar	27	EU	Girona	Transfer ✓	Summer	2015	Free	
10	FW	(Spain)	Rodri	23	EU	Barcelona B	Loan ✓	Summer	2014	Free	
17	MF	(Spain)	Suso	19	EU	Liverpool (England)	Loan ✓	Summer	2014	Free	
25	GK	(Argentina)	Oscar Ustari	27	Non-EU	Boca Juniors (Argentina)	Transfer ✓	Summer	2015	Free	
22	DF	(Portugal)	Nélson	30	EU	Palermo (Italy)	Loan ✓	Summer	2014	Free	
2	DF	(Argentina)	Marco Torsiglieri	25	EU	Metalist Kharkiv (Ukraine)	Loan ✓	Summer	2014	Free	
11	MF	(Portugal)	Hélder Barbosa	26	EU	Braga (Portugal)	Loan ✓	Summer	2014	Free	
19	FW	(Burkina Faso)	Jonathan	24	EU	Almería B	Promoted ✓	During Season	2017	Free	
21	DF	(Spain)	Mané	32	EU	Maccabi Tel Aviv (Israel)	Transfer ✓	Winter	2015	Free	
4	DF	(Chile)	Hans Martínez	26	Non-EU	Universidad Católica (Chile)	Loan ✓	Winter	2014	Free	
25	GK	(Spain)	Julián Cuesta	22	EU	Sevilla	Loan ✓	Winter	2014	Free	

Total spending: ▼€30,000

==== Out ====
No.	Pos.	Nat.	Name	Age	EU	Moving to	Type	Transfer window	Transfer fee	Source
9	FW	(Brazil)	Charles	29	EU	Celta de Vigo	Transfer ✓	Summer	€1M	
14	MF	(Spain)	Iago Falque	23	EU	Tottenham Hotspur (England)	Loan Return ✓	Summer	Free	
21	DF	(Uruguay)	Adrián Gunino	24	EU	Fénix (Uruguay)	Loan Return ✓	Summer	Free	
22	MF	(Spain)	Miguel Pallardó	26	EU	Levante	Loan Return ✓	Summer	Free	
25	GK	(Spain)	Diego García	23	EU	Ponferradina	Contract ended ✓	Summer	Free	
17	DF	(Spain)	Álvaro Mejía	31	EU	Ergotelis (Greece)	Contract ended ✓	Summer	Free	
19	MF	(Spain)	Carlos Calvo	27	EU	Skoda Xanthi (Greece)	Contract ended ✓	Summer	Free	
		(Spain)	Javi Gracia	43	EU	Osasuna	Contract ended ✓	Summer	Free	
16	DF	(Brazil)	Michel	23	EU	Atlético Mineiro (Brazil)	Loan ✓	Summer	Free	
21	MF	(Spain)	Rubén Suárez	34	EU	Skoda Xanthi (Greece)	Contract Rescinded ✓	Summer	Free	
4	DF	(Argentina)	Hernán Pellerano	29	EU	Tijuana (Mexico)	Transfer ✓	During Season	Undisclosed	
18	DF	(Spain)	Christian	28	EU	D.C. United (United States)	Contract Rescinded ✓	Winter	Free	
25	GK	(Argentina)	Oscar Ustari	27	Non-EU	Sunderland (England)	Contract Rescinded ✓	Winter	Free	
14	DF	(Spain)	Raúl García	24	EU	Alavés	Loan ✓	Winter	Free	

Total gaining: ▲€970,000

== Player statistics ==
=== Squad Stats ===
As of 18 May 2014

No.	Pos	Nat	Player	Total		La Liga		Copa del Rey	
No.	Pos	Nat	Player	Apps	Goals	Apps	Goals	Apps	Goals
1	GK	(Spain) ESP	Esteban	38	0	38	0	0	0
2	DF	(Argentina) ARG	Marco Torsiglieri	28	1	26+1	1	1	0
3	DF	(Uruguay) URU	Marcelo Silva	6	0	1+1	0	4	0
4	DF	(Chile) CHI	Hans Martínez	2	0	1	0	1	0
5	DF	(Spain) ESP	Ángel Trujillo	39	1	36	1	1+2	0
6	MF	(Spain) ESP	Marcos Tébar	29	0	16+9	0	4	0
7	MF	(Spain) ESP	Verza	34	8	34	8	0	0
8	MF	(Spain) ESP	Aleix Vidal	42	7	36+2	6	2+2	1
9	FW	(Spain) ESP	Óscar Díaz	34	6	13+17	4	3+1	2
10	FW	(Spain) ESP	Rodri	27	8	21+6	8	0	0
11	MF	(Portugal) POR	Hélder Barbosa	31	1	7+21	1	2+1	0
15	MF	(Spain) ESP	Corona	26	2	12+11	1	3	1
16	DF	(Argentina) ARG	Sebastián Dubarbier	28	1	26+1	1	0+1	0
17	MF	(Spain) ESP	Suso	35	3	26+7	3	2	0
19	FW	(Burkina Faso) BFA	Jonathan	19	1	11+7	1	1	0
20	DF	(Spain) ESP	Rafita	28	0	24+2	0	2	0
21	DF	(Spain) ESP	Mané	11	0	8+1	0	2	0
22	DF	(Portugal) POR	Nélson	15	0	14	0	1	0
23	MF	(Spain) ESP	Fernando Soriano	35	4	24+11	4	0	0
25	GK	(Spain) ESP	Julián Cuesta	0	0	0	0	0	0
27	FW	(Morocco) MAR	Hicham	4	1	0+1	1	1+2	0
29	MF	(South Korea) KOR	Kiu	4	0	0+2	0	0+2	0
31	MF	(Nigeria) NGR	Ramon Azeez	32	2	21+9	2	1+1	0
32	FW	(Spain) ESP	Dani Romera	1	0	0+1	0	0	0
34	MF	(Spain) ESP	Cristóbal	1	0	0	0	1	0
41	DF	(Spain) ESP	Antonio Marín	1	0	0	0	1	0
44	DF	(Spain) ESP	Fran Vélez	5	1	4	1	1	0
Players on loan to other clubs:
14	DF	(Spain) ESP	Raúl García	9	0	2+3	0	4	0
Players who have left the club after the start of the season:
4	DF	(Argentina) ARG	Hernán Pellerano	14	0	13	0	1	0
18	DF	(Spain) ESP	Christian	5	0	4	0	1	0
21	MF	(Spain) ESP	Rubén Suárez	1	0	0+1	0	0	0
25	GK	(Argentina) ARG	Oscar Ustari	4	0	0	0	4	0

=== Top scorers ===
Place	Position	Nation	Number	Name	La Liga	Copa del Rey	Total
1	MF	(Spain)	7	Verza	8	0	8
1	FW	(Spain)	10	Rodri	8	0	8
2	MF	(Spain)	8	Aleix Vidal	6	1	7
3	FW	(Spain)	9	Óscar Díaz	4	2	6
4	MF	(Spain)	23	Fernando Soriano	4	0	4
5	MF	(Spain)	17	Suso	3	0	3
6	MF	(Nigeria)	31	Ramon Azeez	2	0	2
6	MF	(Spain)	15	Corona	1	1	2
7	DF	(Argentina)	2	Marco Torsiglieri	1	0	1
7	DF	(Spain)	5	Ángel Trujillo	1	0	1
7	MF	(Portugal)	11	Hélder Barbosa	1	0	1
7	DF	(Argentina)	16	Sebastián Dubarbier	1	0	1
7	FW	(Burkina Faso)	19	Jonathan	1	0	1
7	FW	(Morocco)	27	Hicham	1	0	1
7	DF	(Spain)	44	Fran Vélez	1	0	1
				TOTALS	43	4	47

=== Disciplinary record ===
Number	Nation	Position	Name	La Liga		Copa del Rey		Total	
Number	Nation	Position	Name	Yellow card	Red card	Yellow card	Red card	Yellow card	Red card
16	(Argentina)	DF	Sebastián Dubarbier	11	1	0	0	11	1
7	(Spain)	MF	Verza	11	0	0	0	11	0
17	(Spain)	MF	Suso	9	1	0	0	9	1
10	(Spain)	FW	Rodri	8	0	0	0	8	0
23	(Spain)	MF	Fernando Soriano	7	0	0	0	7	0
4	(Argentina)	DF	Hernán Pellerano	6	0	0	0	6	0
5	(Spain)	DF	Ángel Trujillo	6	0	0	0	6	0
2	(Argentina)	DF	Marco Torsiglieri	5	1	0	0	5	1
20	(Spain)	DF	Rafita	4	1	1	0	5	1
6	(Spain)	MF	Marcos Tébar	5	0	0	0	5	0
31	(Nigeria)	MF	Ramon Azeez	5	0	0	0	5	0
9	(Spain)	FW	Óscar Díaz	4	0	1	0	5	0
15	(Spain)	MF	Corona	4	0	0	0	4	0
18	(Spain)	DF	Christian	2	1	1	1	3	2
8	(Spain)	MF	Aleix Vidal	3	0	0	0	3	0
1	(Spain)	GK	Esteban	2	0	0	0	2	0
11	(Portugal)	MF	Hélder Barbosa	2	0	0	0	2	0
21	(Spain)	DF	Mané	2	0	0	0	2	0
22	(Portugal)	DF	Nélson	2	0	0	0	2	0
19	(Burkina Faso)	FW	Jonathan	1	0	0	1	1	1
3	(Uruguay)	DF	Marcelo Silva	0	0	1	0	1	0
14	(Spain)	DF	Raúl García	0	0	1	0	1	0
27	(Morocco)	FW	Hicham	0	0	1	0	1	0
44	(Spain)	DF	Fran Vélez	0	0	1	0	1	0
			TOTALS	94	4	7	2	101	6

== Competitions ==
=== Pre-season / Friendlies ===
24 July 2013	Águilas	0 – 3	Almería	Águilas
20:00		Report	9' (pen.) Rubén; 17' Jonathan; 65' Raúl García	Stadium: El Rubial; Referee: Martínez Montalbán

28 July 2013	Almería	0 – 2	Valladolid	Murcia
20:00	Christian (yellow card); Soriano (yellow card)	Report	32' (yellow card) Manucho; 40' Rukavina	Stadium: Pinatar Arena; Attendance: 600; Referee: Navarro Fuentes

31 July 2013	Villarreal	0 – 1	Almería	La Manga
19:00	Pantić (yellow card)	Report	74' (pen.) Verza; (yellow card) Marcelo Silva; (yellow card) Trujillo	Stadium: La Manga Stadium; Referee: Melgares de Aguilar

2 August 2013	Murcia	2 – 3	Almería	Murcia
20:00	Mauro 12' 32'; (red card) 52' Acciari	Report	18' (pen.) Verza; (red card) 52' Soriano; 64' (o.g.) Alcalá; 73' Rubén Suárez	Stadium: Pinatar Arena; Attendance: 2,300; Referee: Lozano Reina

3 August 2013	La Hoya Lorca	1 – 2	Almería	Lorca
20:00	Ortuño 44'	Report	20' Rodri; 50' Aleix Vidal	Stadium: Francisco Artés Carrasco; Referee: Jiménez Iniesta

6 August 2013	Almería	1 – 1	Granada	Almería
21:00	Soriano 55'; Aleix Vidal (yellow card); Verza (yellow card); Rodri (yellow card); Corona (yellow card)	Report	90+1' El Arabi; (yellow card) Fatau	Stadium: Juegos Mediterráneos; Attendance: 6,819; Referee: Fernández Borbalán

10 August 2013	Córdoba	3 – 2	Almería	Córdoba
21:00	Xisco 2'; Pedro 25'; Abel 80'	Report	49' 70' Aleix Vidal	Stadium: Nuevo Arcángel; Attendance: 5,631; Referee: Melero López

14 November 2013	Sevilla	1 – 1 (4–2 p)	Almería	Seville
20:45	Perotti 80' (pen.)	Report	90+2' Christian; (yellow card) Marcelo Silva	Stadium: Ramón Sánchez Pizjuán; Referee: López Amaya
	Penalties
	Perotti (penalty missed); Gameiro (penalty scored); Vitolo (penalty scored); Diogo Figueiras (penalty scored); Cristóforo (penalty scored)		(penalty missed) Rafita; (penalty scored) Tébar; (penalty scored) Marcelo Silva; (penalty missed) Óscar Díaz

=== La Liga ===
==== League table ====
Pos	Team	Pld	W	D	L	GF	GA	GD	Pts	Qualification or relegation
15	Granada	38	12	5	21	32	56	−24	41	
16	Elche	38	9	13	16	30	50	−20	40 (Note: Elche finished ahead of Almería on head-to-head points: Elche 1–0 Almería, Almería 2–2 Elche.)	
17	Almería	38	11	7	20	43	71	−28	40	
18	Osasuna (R)	38	10	9	19	32	62	−30	39	Relegation to Segunda División
19	Valladolid (R)	38	7	15	16	38	60	−22	36	Relegation to Segunda División

Source: La Liga, ESPN
Rules for classification: 1st points; 2nd head-to-head points;
(R) Relegated

==== Results summary ====
Overall								Home						Away					
Pld	W	D	L	GF	GA	GD	Pts	W	D	L	GF	GA	GD	W	D	L	GF	GA	GD
38	11	7	20	43	71	−28	40	6	6	7	26	31	−5	5	1	13	17	40	−23

Last updated: 18 May 2014.
Source: Competitive matches

==== Results by round ====
Round	1	2	3	4	5	6	7	8	9	10	11	12	13	14	15	16	17	18	19	20	21	22	23	24	25	26	27	28	29	30	31	32	33	34	35	36	37	38
Ground	H	A	H	A	H	A	H	A	H	A	A	H	A	H	A	H	A	H	A	A	H	A	H	A	H	A	H	A	H	H	A	H	A	H	A	H	A	H
Result	L	D	D	L	D	L	L	L	L	L	W	W	W	L	L	D	W	W	L	L	W	L	W	L	D	L	L	L	W	D	L	L	L	L	W	W	W	D
Position	12	12	14	15	16	19	18	20	20	20	20	19	16	18	18	19	16	14	16	17	15	15	15	15	15	17	18	19	16	16	18	19	19	19	18	16	15	17

Updated to match(es) played on 18 May 2014. Source:
A = Away; H = Home; W = Win; D = Draw; L = Loss

==== Matches ====
19 August 2013 1	Almería	2 – 3	Villarreal	Almería
22:00	Rafita (yellow card) 34'; Rodri 39' 74'; Pellerano (yellow card) 88'	Report	64' (o.g.) Dubarbier; 83' Giovani dos Santos; 85' Pereira	Stadium: Juegos Mediterráneos; Attendance: 10,036; Referee: Undiano Mallenco

23 August 2013 2	Getafe	2 – 2	Almería	Getafe
20:00	Lafita 31'; Rafa (yellow card) 46'; Diego 84' (pen.); Borja Fernández (yellow card) 90+2'	Report	(yellow card) 22' Suso; 30' Rodri; 36' Soriano	Stadium: Alfonso Pérez; Attendance: 4,000; Referee: Hernández Hernández

1 September 2013 3	Almería	2 – 2	Elche	Almería
23:00	Soriano 10'; Dubarbier (yellow card) 31' (red card) 66'; Verza (yellow card) 36' (goal) 44' (pen.); Pellerano (yellow card) 88'; Suso (yellow card) 90+2'	Report	(yellow card) 26' Botía; 32' (pen.) Edu Albácar; (yellow card) 44' Săpunaru; (yellow card) 56' Lombán; (yellow card) 88' Rubén Pérez; (yellow card) 90+4' Aarón; 90+5' Boakye	Stadium: Juegos Mediterráneos; Attendance: 9,781; Referee: Alvarez Izquierdo

14 September 2013 4	Atlético Madrid	4 – 2	Almería	Madrid
16:00	Villa 15'; Diego Costa 36' (pen.); Filipe Luís (yellow card) 45'; Raúl García (yellow card) 52'; Tiago 63'; Koke 66'	Report	(yellow card) 10' Trujillo; (yellow card) 35' Pellerano; 40' Rodri; (yellow card) 54' Tébar; (yellow card) 87' Suso; 89' Aleix Vidal	Stadium: Vicente Calderón; Attendance: 48,000; Referee: González González

22 September 2013 5	Almería	2 – 2	Levante	Almería
18:00	Soriano (yellow card) 24'; Verza 44' (pen.) (yellow card) 46'; Suso 50'; Christian (yellow card) 53' (red card) 54'; Rodri (yellow card) 54'; Pellerano (yellow card) 56'	Report	(yellow card) 27' Pedro Ríos; (yellow card) 39' Lell; (yellow card) 43' Ivanschitz; 55' (pen.) (yellow card) 76' El Zhar; 60' Pape Diop; (yellow card) 61' Xumetra; (yellow card) 85' David Navarro; (yellow card) 88' Sérgio	Stadium: Juegos Mediterráneos; Attendance: 9,646; Referee: Velasco Carballo

25 September 2013 6	Málaga	2 – 0	Almería	Málaga
22:00	Tissone 69' (yellow card) 69'; Sergio Sánchez (yellow card) 84'; Portillo 89'	Report	(yellow card) 65' Dubarbier	Stadium: La Rosaleda; Attendance: 25,000; Referee: Clos Gómez

28 September 2013 7	Almería	0 – 2	Barcelona	Almería
18:00	Verza (yellow card) 27'	Report	20' Messi; (yellow card) 26' Bartra; 56' Adriano; (yellow card) 76' Sergio Busquets	Stadium: Juegos Mediterráneos; Attendance: 11,795; Referee: Ayza Gámez

6 October 2013 8	Sevilla	2 – 1	Almería	Seville
17:00	Gameiro 5'; Iborra (yellow card) 31'; Alberto Moreno (yellow card) 70'; Fazio (yellow card) 77'; Cristóforo (yellow card) 88'; Rakitić 90+2'	Report	(yellow card) 12' Verza; (yellow card) 20' (goal) 23' Rodri; (yellow card) 51' Christian; (yellow card) 87' Suso; (yellow card) 90' Soriano	Stadium: Sánchez Pizjuán; Attendance: 35,000; Referee: Iglesias Villanueva

20 October 2013 9	Almería	0 – 1	Rayo Vallecano	Almería
17:00	Pellerano (yellow card) 88'; Soriano (yellow card) 90'	Report	(yellow card) 35' Bangoura; (yellow card) 44' (goal) 78' Gálvez; (yellow card) 53' (red card) 64' Saúl; (yellow card) 56' Tito	Stadium: Juegos Mediterráneos; Attendance: 9,890; Referee: Delgado Ferreiro

27 October 2013 10	Real Sociedad	3 – 0	Almería	San Sebastián
19:00	Griezmann 12' 49'; Pardo (yellow card) 35'; José Ángel 55'	Report	(yellow card) 4' Rodri; (yellow card) 48' Torsiglieri; (yellow card) 53' Rafita	Stadium: Anoeta; Attendance: 24,300; Referee: Teixeira Vitienes

30 October 2013 11	Valencia	1 – 2	Almería	Valencia
20:00	Jonas 32'	Report	(yellow card) 19' Dubarbier; (yellow card) 28' Barbosa; (yellow card) 35' Pellerano; 61' Torsiglieri; 69' Aleix Vidal; (yellow card) 83' Nélson; (yellow card) 85' Suso	Stadium: Mestalla; Attendance: 30,000; Referee: Prieto Iglesias

2 November 2013 12	Almería	1 – 0	Valladolid	Almería
18:00	Trujillo (yellow card) 33'; Rodri 38' (yellow card) 51'; Verza (yellow card) 67'; Esteban (yellow card) 89'	Report	(yellow card) 23' (red card) 74' Ebert; (yellow card) 38' Mariño; (yellow card) 86' Peña	Stadium: Juegos Mediterráneos; Attendance: 9,278; Referee: Muñiz Fernández

8 November 2013 13	Osasuna	0 – 1	Almería	Pamplona
20:00	Damià (yellow card) 16'; Oriol Riera (yellow card) 76'	Report	18' Rodri; (yellow card) 23' Tébar; (yellow card) 70' Aleix Vidal; (yellow card) 75' Óscar Díaz	Stadium: El Sadar; Attendance: 14,654; Referee: Mateu Lahoz

23 November 2013 14	Almería	0 – 5	Real Madrid	Almería
20:00	Esteban (yellow card) 73'	Report	3' Cristiano Ronaldo; (yellow card) 55' Arbeloa; 61' Benzema; (yellow card) 67' Sergio Ramos; 72' Bale; 75' Isco; 81' Morata	Stadium: Juegos Mediterráneos; Attendance: 13,605; Referee: Gil Manzano

30 November 2013 15	Celta Vigo	3 – 1	Almería	Vigo
18:00	Krohn-Dehli (yellow card) 9'; Orellana 26'; Borja Oubiña 49'; Charles 59'	Report	9' (yellow card) 79' Suso; (yellow card) 59' Dubarbier	Stadium: Balaídos; Attendance: 18,947; Referee: Ayza Gámez

15 December 2013 16	Almería	0 – 0	Espanyol	Almería
12:00	Verza (penalty missed) 23'	Report	(yellow card) 43' Moreno; (yellow card) 81' Sergio García	Stadium: Juegos Mediterráneos; Attendance: 9,128; Referee: Del Cerro Grande

21 December 2013 17	Real Betis	0 – 1	Almería	Seville
18:00		Report	3' Azeez; (yellow card) 26' Barbosa; (yellow card) 56' Nélson	Stadium: Benito Villamarín; Attendance: 26,550; Referee: Juan Martínez Munuera

4 January 2014 18	Almería	3 – 0	Granada	Almería
22:00	Dubarbier 13'; Verza 27' (pen.) (yellow card) 41'; Soriano (yellow card) 35'; Azeez (yellow card) 69'; Aleix Vidal 79'	Report	(yellow card) 25' Diakhaté; (yellow card) 27' Mainz; (yellow card) 56' Yebda	Stadium: Juegos Mediterráneos; Attendance: 8,972; Referee: Estrada Fernández

11 January 2013 19	Athletic Bilbao	6 – 1	Almería	Bilbao
16:00	Mikel Rico 6' (yellow card) 82'; Ander Herrera 11'; Laporte 29'; San José (yellow card) 33'; Aduriz 52'; Ibai 68' 87' (pen.)	Report	34' Barbosa; (yellow card) 35' Torsiglieri	Stadium: San Mamés; Attendance: 36,000; Referee: Gil Manzano

19 January 2013 20	Villarreal	2 – 0	Almería	Villarreal
17:00	Uche 3' (yellow card) 47'; Jaume Costa (yellow card) 81'	Report	(yellow card) 70' Dubarbier	Stadium: El Madrigal; Attendance: 18,000; Referee: Muñiz Fernández

26 January 2014 21	Almería	1 – 0	Getafe	Almería
12:00	Jonathan 48'; Tébar (yellow card) 75'; Dubarbier (yellow card) 88'	Report	(yellow card) 37' Sarabia; (yellow card) 74' Lacen	Stadium: Juegos Mediterráneos; Attendance: 8,985; Referee: Prieto Iglesias

2 February 2013 21	Elche	1 – 0	Almería	Elche
12:00	Javi Márquez (yellow card) 49'; Cristian Herrera 59'; Edu Albácar (yellow card) 73'; Rubén Pérez (yellow card) 77'; Damián Suárez (yellow card) 85' (red card) 90'	Report	(yellow card) 24' Suso; (yellow card) 40' Azeez; (yellow card) 82' Torsiglieri	Stadium: Manuel Martínez Valero; Attendance: 24,825; Referee: Teixeira Vitiennes

8 February 2014 23	Almería	2 – 0	Atlético Madrid	Almería
22:00	Soriano (yellow card) 42'; Dubarbier (yellow card) 57'; Verza 79' 85' (pen.)	Report	(yellow card) 22' Diego; (yellow card) 54' Raúl García; (red card) 84' Aranzubia	Stadium: Juegos Mediterráneos; Attendance: 10,958; Referee: Teixeira Vitienes

15 February 2013 24	Levante	1 – 0	Almería	Valencia
18:00	David Navarro (yellow card) 1'; Barral 61'	Report	(yellow card) 31' Dubarbier; (yellow card) 37' Azeez; (yellow card) 53' Trujillo; (yellow card) 87' Suso	Stadium: Ciutat de València; Attendance: 15,538; Referee: Velasco Carballo

22 February 2014 25	Almería	0 – 0	Málaga	Almería
22:00	Soriano (yellow card) 29'; Verza (yellow card) 36'	Report	(yellow card) 32' Antunes; (yellow card) 35' Angeleri; (yellow card) 45' Jesús Gámez; (yellow card) 84' Yakovenko; (yellow card) 85' Pablo Pérez	Stadium: Juegos Mediterráneos; Attendance: 9,874; Referee: Muñiz Fernández

2 March 2014 26	Barcelona	4 – 1	Almería	Barcelona
21:00	Alexis 9'; Messi 23'; Adriano (yellow card) 26'; Puyol 83'; Xavi 89'	Report	(yellow card) 17' Azeez; (yellow card) 23' Corona; 26' Trujillo; (yellow card) 81' Verza; (yellow card) 86' Tébar	Stadium: Camp Nou; Attendance: 58,930; Referee: Del Cerro Grande

9 March 2014 27	Almería	1 – 3	Sevilla	Almería
17:00	Dubarbier (yellow card) 38'; Rodri (yellow card) 44'; Aleix Vidal 84'	Report	(yellow card) 15' Fernando Navarro; 30' Bacca; (yellow card) 44' Reyes; 51' Daniel Carriço; (yellow card) 66' Diogo Figueiras; 76' Gameiro; (yellow card) 86' Beto	Stadium: Juegos Mediterráneos; Attendance: 11,869; Referee: Clos Gómez

15 March 2014 28	Rayo Vallecano	3 – 1	Almería	Madrid
18:00	Bueno 37'; Larrivey 56' 76'; Raț (yellow card) 66'	Report	(yellow card) 42' Dubarbier; 71' Soriano; (yellow card) 78' Rodri; (yellow card) 79' Corona	Stadium: Campo de Fútbol de Vallecas; Attendance: 11,778; Referee: Prieto Iglesias

24 March 2014 29	Almería	4 – 3	Real Sociedad	Almería
22:00	Trujillo (yellow card) 20'; Óscar Díaz 29' (yellow card) 62'; Verza 66' (pen.) 70' (pen.) (yellow card) 73'; Soriano (yellow card) 72'; Hicham 90+1'	Report	21' (pen.) Vela; 58' Agirretxe; (yellow card) 65' Martínez; (yellow card) 70' Mikel González; 85' Markel Bergara; (yellow card) 87' De la Bella	Stadium: Juegos Mediterráneos; Attendance: 7,051; Referee: Ayza Gámez

27 March 2014 30	Almería	2 – 2	Valencia	Almería
22:00	Corona (yellow card) 8' (goal) 54'; Aleix Vidal (yellow card) 24'; Trujillo (yellow card) 37'; Óscar Díaz 52' (yellow card) 56'; Verza (yellow card) 85'	Report	1' Keita; 17' Vargas; (yellow card) 80' João Pereira	Stadium: Juegos Mediterráneos; Attendance: 11,215; Referee: Teixeira Vitienes

30 March 2014 31	Valladolid	1 – 0	Almería	Valladolid
12:00	Manucho 6'; Rukavina (yellow card) 7'; Larsson (yellow card) 80'	Report	(yellow card) 25' (red card) 74' Torsiglieri	Stadium: José Zorrilla; Attendance: 15,585; Referee: Teixeira Vitienes

4 April 2014 32	Almería	1 – 2	Osasuna	Almería
21:00	Suso (yellow card) 1'; Soriano 75'; Rafita (yellow card) 90' (red card) 90+3'	Report	19' Oriol Riera; (yellow card) 23' Marc Bertrán; 33' Arribas	Stadium: Juegos Mediterráneos; Attendance: 8,958; Referee: Mateu Lahoz

12 April 2014 33	Real Madrid	4 – 0	Almería	Madrid
22:00	Di María 27'; Bale 52'; Isco 55'; Morata 84'	Report		Stadium: Santiago Bernabéu; Attendance: 65,896; Referee: Juan Martínez Munuera

20 April 2014 34	Almería	2 – 4	Celta Vigo	Almería
12:00	Verza (yellow card) 11'; Rodri 40' (yellow card) 67'; Mané (yellow card) 41'; Tébar (yellow card) 71'; Óscar Díaz (yellow card) 85' (goal) 87'	Report	19' 71' Nolito; 51' Charles; 75' Orellana	Stadium: Juegos Mediterráneos; Attendance: 11,829; Referee: Muñiz Fernández

27 April 2014 35	Espanyol	1 – 2	Almería	Barcelona
12:00	Víctor Álvarez (yellow card) 15'; Stuani (yellow card) 29' (goal) 42' (red card) 48'; Víctor Sánchez (yellow card) 70'; Sergio García (yellow card) 79'; Javi López (yellow card) 90+2'; Héctor Moreno (yellow card) 90+3'	Report	(yellow card) 33' Dubarbier; (yellow card) 51' Corona; 69' Fran Vélez; 71' Suso; (yellow card) 86' Trujillo	Stadium: Cornellà-El Prat; Attendance: 14,678; Referee: Hernández Hernández

4 May 2014 36	Almería	3 – 2	Betis	Almería
12:00	Aleix Vidal (yellow card) 46' (goal) 77'; Óscar Díaz 51'; Suso (red card) 52'; Rodri (yellow card) 58'; Azeez 90+4'; Jonathan (yellow card) 90+5'; Mané (yellow card) 90+5'	Report	(yellow card) 27' N'Diaye; (yellow card) 58' Perquis; 58' Rodríguez; 71' Salva Sevilla; (yellow card) 45+1' Matilla; (yellow card) 90+5' Jordi Figueras; (yellow card) 90+5' Rubén Castro; (yellow card) 90+5' Reyes	Stadium: Juegos Mediterráneos; Attendance: 9,446; Referee: Ignacio Iglesias Villanueva

11 May 2014 37	Granada	0 – 2	Almería	Granada
19:00	Fran Rico (yellow card) 18'; Iturra (yellow card) 25'; Ilori (yellow card) 48'; Murillo (red card) 81'	Report	19' (pen.) Verza; (yellow card) 44' Torsiglieri; (yellow card) 70' Rafita; 83' (pen.) Aleix Vidal	Stadium: Los Cármenes; Attendance: 18,000; Referee: Gil Manzano

18 May 2014 38	Almería	0 – 0	Athletic Bilbao	Almería
18:00	Azeez (yellow card) 74'	Report	(yellow card) 17' Morán; (yellow card) 32' Beñat; (yellow card) 35' Balenziaga; (yellow card) 56' Laporte; (yellow card) 90+2' Ander Herrera	Stadium: Juegos Mediterráneos; Attendance: 12,000; Referee: Estrada Fernández

=== Copa del Rey ===
8 December 2013 16th Finals	Las Palmas	1 – 3	Almería	Las Palmas
16:00	Nauzet 73' (red card) 84'; Dani Castellano (yellow card) 74'	Report	14' 25' (yellow card) 81' Óscar Díaz; 20' Aleix Vidal; (yellow card) 39' Raúl García; (yellow card) 53' (red card) 58' Christian; (yellow card) 77' Marcelo Silva; (yellow card) 84' Rafita	Stadium: Gran Canaria; Referee: Álvarez Izquierdo

18 December 2013 16th Finals	Almería	0 – 0	Las Palmas	Almería
19:30		Report	(yellow card) 21' Asdrúbal	Stadium: Juegos Mediterráneos; Attendance: 4,684; Referee: Delgado Ferreiro

8 January 2014 Round of 16	Racing de Santander	1 – 1	Almería	Santander
22:00	Concha 64'; Borja Granero (yellow card) 77'	Report	26' Corona; (red card) 80' Jonathan	Stadium: Campos de Sport de El Sardinero; Attendance: 1,500; Referee: Ignacio Iglesias Villanueva

14 January 2014 Round of 16	Almería	0 – 2	Racing Santander	Almería
19:00	Fran Vélez (yellow card) 15'; Hicham (yellow card) 73'	Report	(yellow card) 28' Saúl García; 62' (yellow card) 67' Mariano; 78' Rubén Durán	Stadium: Juegos Mediterráneos; Attendance: 4,872; Referee: Hernández Hernández
