= Suso (footballer) =

Spanish footballer (born 1993)

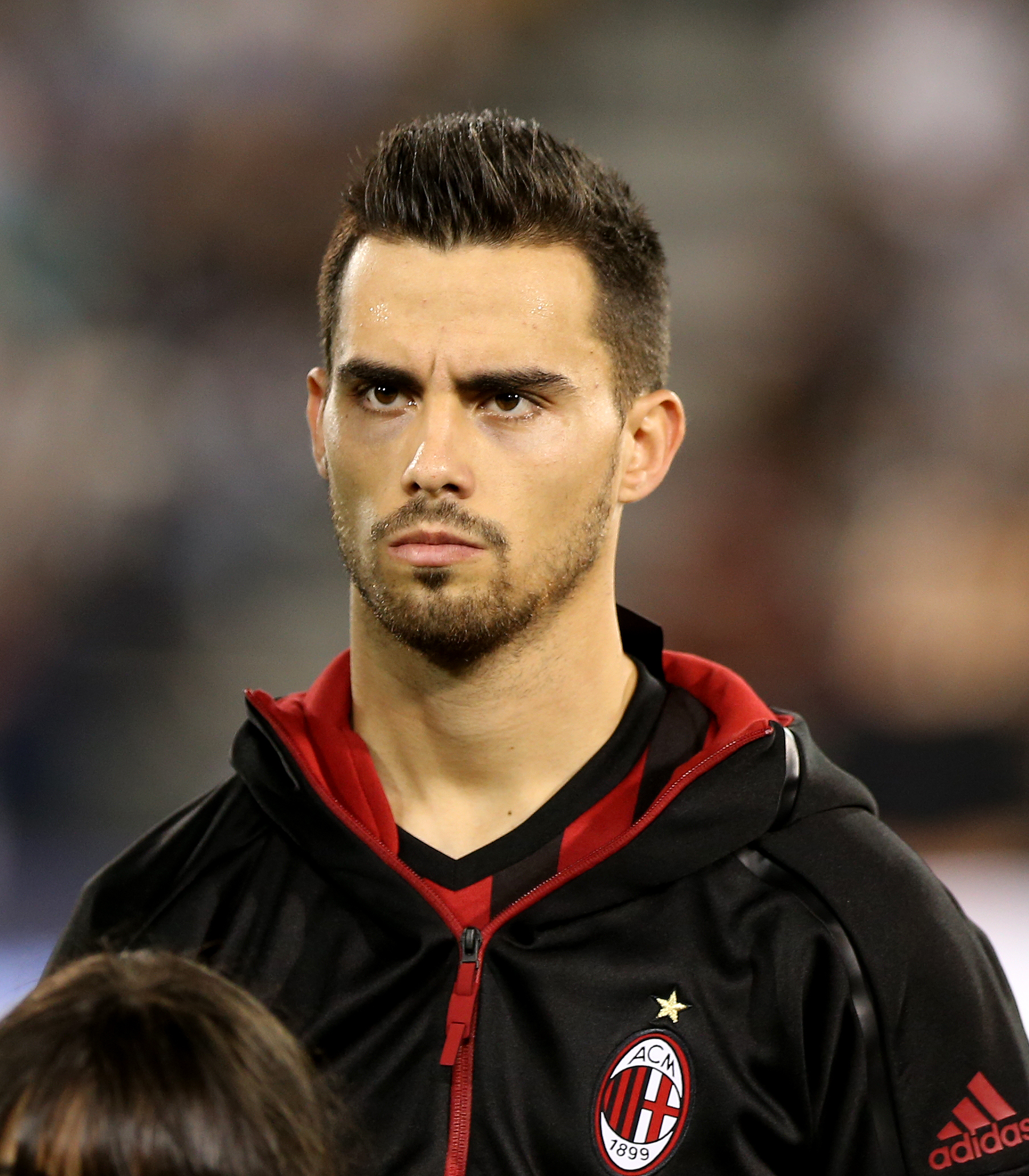
- Suso with AC Milan in 2016

Personal information
- Full name: Jesús Joaquín Fernández Sáenz de la Torre
- Date of birth: 19 November 1993 (age 33)
- Place of birth: Algeciras, Spain
- Height: 1.75 m (5 ft 9 in)
- Positions: Attacking midfielder; right winger

Youth career
- 2004–2010: Cádiz
- 2010–2012: Liverpool

Senior career*
Years	Team	Apps	(Gls)
2012–2015	Liverpool	14	(0)
2013–2014	→ Almería (loan)	33	(3)
2015–2020	AC Milan	126	(21)
2016	→ Genoa (loan)	19	(6)
2020	→ Sevilla (loan)	17	(1)
2020–2025	Sevilla	112	(6)
2025–2026	Cádiz	27	(1)
Total		348	(38)

International career
2009–2010	Spain U17	7	(5)
2011–2012	Spain U18	5	(0)
2012	Spain U19	9	(1)
2013	Spain U20	8	(1)
2012–2013	Spain U21	5	(0)
2017–2019	Spain	5	(0)
- * Club domestic league appearances and goals

Jesús Joaquín Fernández Sáenz de la Torre (Spanish pronunciation: [xeˈsus xoaˈkiɱ feɾˈnandeθ ˈsaenθ ðe la ˈtore]; (Note: In isolation, Joaquín is pronounced [xoaˈkin].) born 19 November 1993), known as Suso [ˈsuso], is a Spanish former professional footballer who played as an attacking midfielder or right winger.

Scouted by English club Liverpool as a teenager, Suso made his professional debut there in 2012, playing sparingly and spending a season on loan at Almería before joining AC Milan in January 2015. He was loaned to fellow Serie A club Genoa in January 2016. In January 2020, Suso was loaned to La Liga club Sevilla, before joining the club permanently in July of that year.

Suso represented Spain at various youth levels up to under-21, winning the 2012 UEFA European Under-19 Championship.

== Club career ==
=== Liverpool ===
Suso initially joined the Liverpool Academy on loan until he was old enough to obtain a permit to play for them professionally. On 19 November 2010, he marked his 17th birthday by signing his first professional contract with the Reds. Suso made his first appearance for the first team at a pre-season friendly against Borussia Mönchengladbach on 1 August 2010, also playing in Jamie Carragher's testimonial match on 4 September. For competitive fixtures, however, he was immediately placed in the reserves, forgoing the Academy. In the 2010–11 season, he made the joint-highest number of appearances for the side with 17, and netted three goals as he adapted well to life on Merseyside. He followed this up with five goals in 17 games during the 2011–12 season, and he also made seven appearances in the NextGen Series.

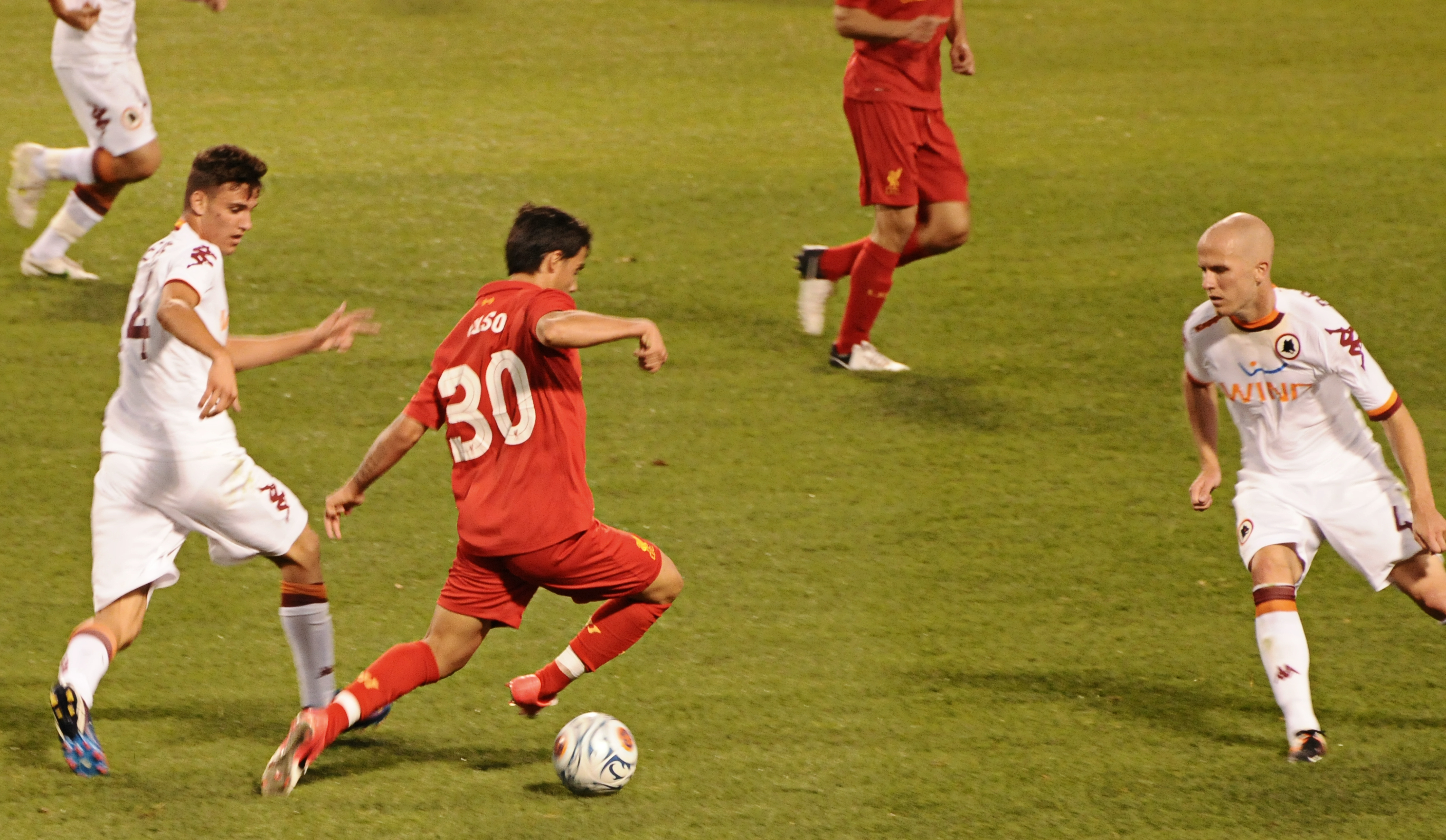
Suso on the ball for Liverpool in a pre-season friendly against Roma in July 2012

On 20 September 2012, Suso made his senior Liverpool debut in a Europa League match against Young Boys, completing the full 90 minutes and earning a rave review from Brendan Rodgers. He made his Premier League debut three days later against Manchester United in a 2–1 defeat at Anfield, replacing the injured Fabio Borini at half-time. He performed impressively, completing all his passes despite Liverpool being a man down. He then played in the next game against West Bromwich Albion six days later in the League Cup, coming on with ten minutes to play and making an immediate impact by helping set up Nuri Şahin's second goal in a 2–1 win. He went on to make his first Premier League start on 29 September in a 5-2 win at Norwich City, where he assisted Luis Suárez's third goal.

On 19 October 2012, Suso signed a new long-term contract with Liverpool, receiving praise from manager Brendan Rodgers for his "maturity and commitment."

On 18 December 2012, Suso was fined £10,000 for a remark he made to Liverpool teammate and compatriot José Enrique on Twitter, which The Football Association (FA) deemed homophobic. José Enrique replied to these charges, saying the remark was "banter" and "just a joke."

On 25 February 2013, after being shut-out of the first team due to the signings of Daniel Sturridge and Philippe Coutinho, Suso put in a poor performance for the under-21 team against Manchester United, which he acknowledged on his Twitter account, tweeting "Sorry about tonight.. I was having some stomach problems during all game but i [sic] didn't want to come off of the game... Again sorry!" The game finished 1–0 to United against a very strong Liverpool side that included Raheem Sterling, Andre Wisdom and Jonjo Shelvey.

==== Almería (loan) ====
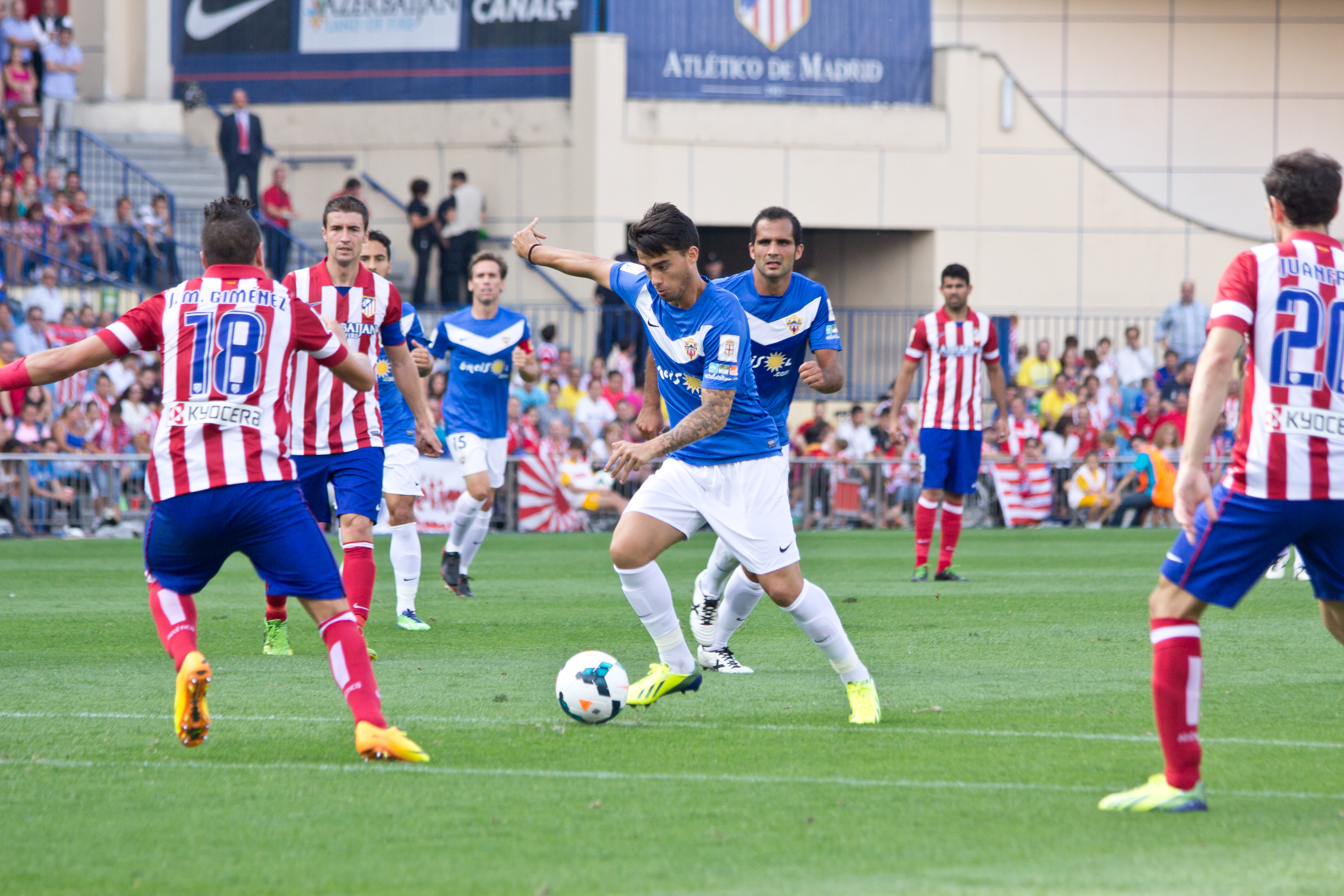
Suso (center) playing for Almería against Atlético Madrid in September 2013

On 12 July 2013, Suso joined La Liga side Almería on a season-long loan deal. He made his debut for the Andalusians on 19 August, assisting Rodri's goal in an eventual 2–3 home loss against Villarreal. In the following matchday, he also assisted Rodri in a 2–2 away draw against Getafe. On 21 September, Suso scored his first top flight goal in a 2–2 home draw against Levante. On 30 October, he helped his side end a wretched run of five successive defeats, assisting Marco Torsiglieri in a 2–1 away success over Valencia. On 2 November, Suso assisted Rodri by putting a cross into the six-yard box that was converted by the forward, who slid to meet the ball. It was the match's only goal (although highly-controversial) in a home win over Real Valladolid. Late in the month, Suso scored his second goal for the Andalusians, his team's only marker in a 3–1 away loss against Celta de Vigo, but was also fined for missing training due to oversleeping. Suso was then dropped to the bench in the following matches against Real Betis, Granada, Athletic Bilbao and Villarreal, only returning to the starting lineup on 26 January of the following year, assisting Jonathan Zongo in the game's only goal against Getafe.

==== Return to Liverpool ====
Suso was first recalled to a Liverpool matchday squad as they began their Champions League campaign on 16 September 2014 with a 2–1 win over Bulgarian club Ludogorets Razgrad, though he went unused. A week later, in a League Cup third round match against Middlesbrough at Anfield, he replaced Lazar Marković in the 98th minute and scored his first goal for the club 11 minutes later in a 2–2 draw after extra time. He also scored twice in the subsequent penalty shoot-out, including the winner, as Liverpool won 14–13.

=== AC Milan ===
==== 2014–15 season ====
On 12 January 2015, Suso signed a four-year deal with Italian club AC Milan, effective upon the expiration of his contract with Liverpool, which ended in July 2015. It was later agreed, however, that he would join the Rossoneri immediately after Riccardo Saponara joined Empoli on loan until the end of the season. Due to the early cancellation of Suso's Liverpool contract, Milan paid a €1.3 million compensatory fee to Liverpool.

Suso made his debut on 27 January in the quarter-finals of the Coppa Italia, replacing Michelangelo Albertazzi for the last ten minutes of a 0–1 home defeat against Lazio. Suso's Serie A debut came on 4 April, coming on alongside Giampaolo Pazzini in place of Alessio Cerci and Mattia Destro in the 77th minute of a 2–1 win away at Palermo. On 15 May, he assisted Alex's goal in a 3–2 defeat against Sassuolo. Later on in that match, he received a red card after a foul on Francesco Magnanelli. He ended his first season with 1 assist in 6 appearances in all competition.

==== 2015–16 season: loan to Genoa ====
After Siniša Mihajlović replaced Filippo Inzaghi as Milan's coach for 2015–16 season, Suso could not establish himself in Milan's starting line-up and after making only two appearances, he was loaned to Genoa during the January transfer season.

On 4 January 2016, Suso joined Genoa on loan until the end of the season after only appearing once in the campaign for Milan. Upon his arrival he was given the number 17 jersey. On 3 April, after only one goal in his previous 12 games, he scored his first hat-trick in a 4–0 win over Frosinone at the Stadio Luigi Ferraris. He became only the second Spaniard to score three goals in a game in Italy's top flight, after Luis Suárez for Inter Milan against Genoa in 1963.

==== 2016–17 season: Return to Milan ====
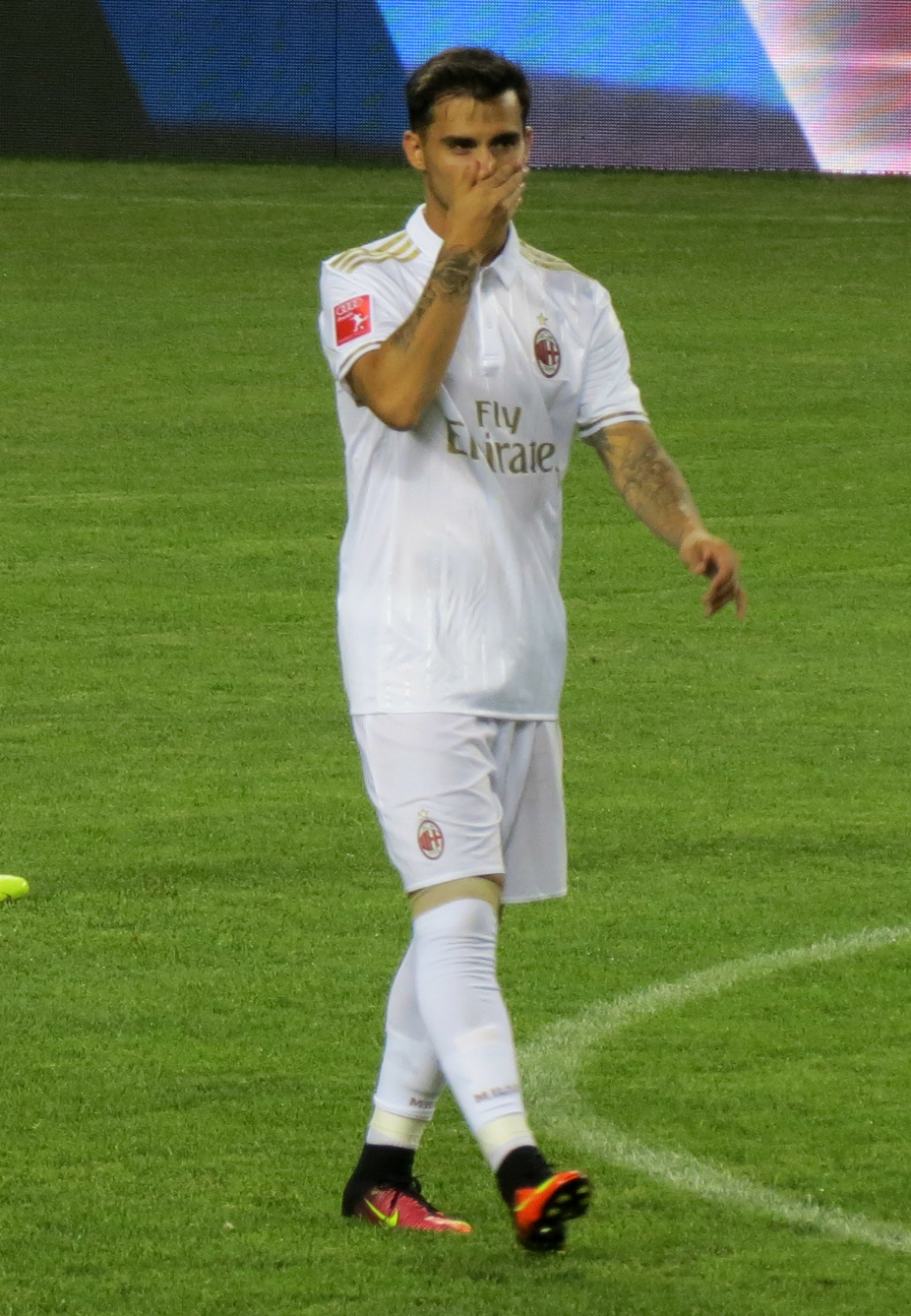
Suso during AC Milan's pre season against Bayern Munich in 2016

After being loaned out due to lack of confidence in him by Milan coach Siniša Mihajlović, Suso started getting playing time under new manager Vincenzo Montella. After impressing in the pre-season and in the first matches of 2016–17 Serie A, Suso was considered to play a pivotal role in the season. Suso scored his first league goal for Milan in the second matchday of Serie A against Napoli, an equalizer in the eventual 2-4 defeat. On 16 September 2016, he assisted Carlos Bacca's goal in a 1–0 win against Sampdoria. He also assisted Manuel Locatelli goal against Juventus on 22 October. He score Milan's first goal and assisted the second goal in the 2–1 win against Palermo on 6 November. The following week, scored his first brace in a 2–2 draw against Inter Milan at San Siro. He scored a goal and assisted another two as Milan beat Empoli 4–1 in the next match.

On 23 December 2016, Suso assisted Giacomo Bonaventura's equalising goal in the Supercoppa Italiana against Juventus; he later converted his penalty in the resulting shoot-out, leading Milan to a 4–3 victory.

Suso concluded the 2016-17 season scoring seven goals along with nine assists finishing as Milan's highest assist maker.

==== 2017–18 season ====
Suso began the 2017–18 season where he left off the season before, in the 2017–18 season opener against Crotone, Suso assisted Patrick Cutrone before scoring himself in a 3–0 away win. On 14 September, he scored a long-range goal against FK Austria Wien, his first European goal for Milan.

On 25 September 2017, Suso signed a contract extension that will keep him at the club until 2022. His last goal with AC Milan was scored in a home match against Spal, from a direct freekick.

=== Sevilla ===
On 29 January 2020, Suso joined Sevilla on a 18-month loan deal, which includes an obligatory purchase clause. On 2 February 2020, he made his debut for the club, coming on as a substitute in a home La Liga draw against Alavés. On 16 February 2020, he assisted his former AC Milan teammate Lucas Ocampos' goal and later, assisted by Ocampos, scored his debut goal for the club in a home 2–2 league draw against Espanyol. On 20 July 2020, Sevilla announced the club had signed Suso on a permanent deal for €24 million, with him signing a five-year contract. On 16 August 2020, Suso scored in a 2–1 victory over Manchester United in the semi-final of the Europa League. He then played in the final of the competition, which Sevilla won 3–2 against Inter Milan.

=== Cádiz ===
On 6 June 2025, Suso agreed to a four-year contract with his first club Cádiz CF. On 29 August 2026, the club announced his retirement and Suso immediately became a institutional representative of the club.

== International career ==
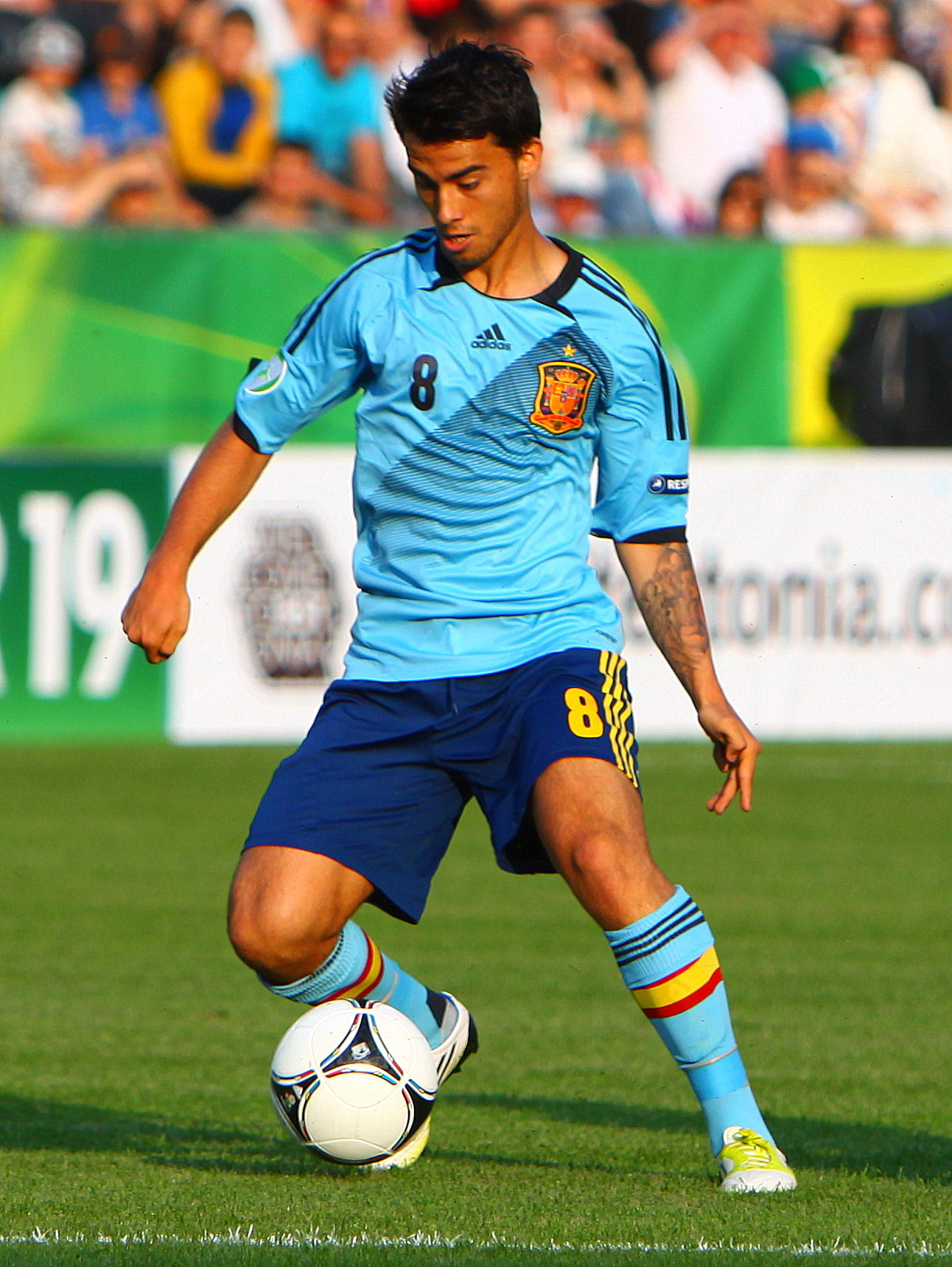
Suso in action with Spain under-19 in 2012

Suso represented Spain at U-17, U-18, U-19, U-20 and U-21 level. In 2012, Suso started every game during the U-19 European Championship, where he won his first international honour. On 9 October 2012, Suso received his first call up to Spain U21 for their game against Italy.

Suso was also captain of the Spain under-20 side that competed in the 2013 FIFA U-20 World Cup.

In August 2017, Suso was called up for the first time to the Spain senior side for a 2018 FIFA World Cup qualifier against Italy the following month. He was chosen by Julen Lopetegui, his former manager at under-20 and under-21 level. He finally made his debut in a friendly against Russia on 14 November 2017.

== Style of play ==
Left-footed, Suso was capable of playing midfielder and forward, on either flank or in the centre of the pitch. He usually played as an attacking midfielder or as a winger. Suso was also used as a central midfielder and in the mezzala role. Suso was known for his ability to beat opponents on the ball, as well as his vision and passing accuracy, which enabled him to set the tempo of his team's play, play quick exchanges with other midfielders, and provide assists for his teammates; he was also known for being accurate from set pieces. Former Milan midfielder Dejan Savićević compared Suso with himself saying: "He’s like me, he’s also got a great shot. He’s a player who can invent an assist, invent a shot. He can invent from one moment to the next, he’s the one who most possesses that quality."

Suso was an inverted winger. During his time at AC Milan, he developed his signature move of cutting into the opponent's penalty box from the right flank to shoot with his stronger left foot. Scoring a number of goals this way led to several comparisons of Suso with the Dutch forward Arjen Robben, who was credited with popularizing this exact technique among many younger wingers of the 2010s.

== Career statistics ==
=== Club ===
Appearances and goals by club, season and competition
Club	Season	League			Cup (Note: Includes FA Cup, Football League Cup, Copa del Rey, Coppa Italia)		Europe		Other		Total	
Club	Season	Division	Apps	Goals	Apps	Goals	Apps	Goals	Apps	Goals	Apps	Goals
Liverpool	2012–13	Premier League	14	0	2	0	4 (Note: Appearance(s) in UEFA Europa League)	0	—		20	0
Liverpool	2014–15	Premier League	0	0	1	1	—		—		1	1
Liverpool	Total		14	0	3	1	4	0	—		21	1
Almería (loan)	2013–14	La Liga	33	3	2	0	—		—		35	3
Milan	2014–15	Serie A	5	0	1	0	—		—		6	0
Milan	2015–16	Serie A	1	0	1	0	—		—		2	0
Milan	2016–17	Serie A	34	7	2	0	—		1 (Note: Appearance in Supercoppa Italiana)	0	37	7
Milan	2017–18	Serie A	35	6	5	1	10	1	—		50	8
Milan	2018–19	Serie A	35	7	2	0	4	1	—		41	8
Milan	2019–20	Serie A	16	1	1	0	—		—		17	1
Milan	Total		126	21	12	1	14	2	1	0	153	24
Genoa (loan)	2015–16	Serie A	19	6	0	0	—		—		19	6
Sevilla (loan)	2019–20	La Liga	17	1	0	0	6	1	—		23	2
Sevilla	2020–21	La Liga	34	3	5	0	4 (Note: Appearance(s) in UEFA Champions League)	1	1 (Note: Appearance in UEFA Super Cup)	0	44	4
Sevilla	2021–22	La Liga	8	0	0	0	4	0	—		12	0
Sevilla	2022–23	La Liga	25	2	4	0	14 (Note: Six appearances in UEFA Champions League, eight appearances and one goal in UEFA Europa League)	1	—		43	3
Sevilla	2023–24	La Liga	29	1	2	0	2	0	1	0	34	1
Sevilla	2024–25	La Liga	16	0	1	0	—		—		17	0
Sevilla	Sevilla total		129	7	12	0	30	3	2	0	173	10
Cádiz	2025–26	Segunda División	27	1	0	0	—		—		27	1
Career total			348	38	29	2	48	5	3	0	428	45

=== International ===
Appearances and goals by national team and year
National team	Year	Apps	Goals
Spain	2017	1	0
Spain	2018	3	0
Spain	2019	1	0
Total		5	0

== Honours ==
AC Milan

- Supercoppa Italiana: 2016

Sevilla

- UEFA Europa League: 2019–20, 2022–23

=== International ===
Spain U19

- UEFA European Under-19 Championship: 2012

Individual

- UEFA European Under-19 Championship Team of the Tournament: 2012
