= Pedro Vázquez =

Pedro Vázquez may refer to:

- Pedro Vázquez (politician) (1934–2011), Puerto Rican politician
- Pedro Vázquez Colmenares (1934–2012), Mexican politician
- Pedro Vázquez González (born 1953), Mexican politician
- Pedro Vázquez (footballer) (born 1989), Spanish footballer
- Pedro Vázquez (canoeist) (born 1996), Spanish canoeist

== See also ==
- Pedro Vásquez (1591–1624), Spanish missionary
- Pedro Vásquez de Velasco (1657–1714), Peruvian bishop
- Pedro Nel Ospina Vázquez (1858–1927), Colombian former president
- Pedro Ramírez Vázquez (1919–2013), Mexican architect
