= Antonio García Márquez =

Spanish footballer

Personal information
- Full name: Antonio García Márquez
- Date of birth: 1 July 1989 (age 37)
- Place of birth: Málaga, Spain
- Height: 1.84 m (6 ft 0 in)
- Position: Midfielder

Team information
- Current team: Vélez

Youth career
- Murcia

Senior career*
Years	Team	Apps	(Gls)
2008–2010	Murcia B	18	(1)
2008	→ Calasparra (loan)	11	(0)
2009	→ Comarca Níjar (loan)	17	(0)
2010–2012	Almería B	58	(1)
2011	Almería	1	(0)
2012–2013	Murcia B	22	(1)
2014–2016	Vélez	56	(1)
2017–	Vélez	15	(1)
- * Club domestic league appearances and goals as of 17 December 2017

Antonio García Márquez (born 1 July 1989) is a Spanish footballer who plays for Vélez CF as a midfielder.

== Club career ==
Born in Málaga, García Márquez started playing as a senior with Real Murcia's B-team, also being loaned to amateur clubs during his stint. After one full season with the club he returned to his native Andalusia and signed with UD Almería, playing initially for the reserves in the third division; on 30 September 2011 he was selected for the match against Recreativo de Huelva and, the following day, played his first and only game as a professional, which consisted of one minute in a 1–0 away win in the second level championship after he came on as a substitute for Rafita.

In the 2012 summer, García was released by Almería and returned to Murcia B, being released a year later. On 17 June 2014 he moved to Vélez CF also in the fourth level.
