= Michel Macedo (footballer) =

Brazilian footballer

Personal information
- Full name: Michel Macedo Rocha Machado
- Date of birth: 15 February 1990 (age 36)
- Place of birth: Rio de Janeiro, Brazil
- Height: 1.82 m (6 ft 0 in)
- Position: Right back

Team information
- Current team: Ceará
- Number: 88

Youth career
- Soft Lazer
- 1997–2005: Botafogo
- 2005–2008: Flamengo

Senior career*
Years	Team	Apps	(Gls)
2008–2016	Almería	142	(4)
2012–2014	→ Atlético Mineiro (loan)	23	(1)
2016–2018	Las Palmas	54	(0)
2019–2021	Corinthians	29	(1)
2021	→ Juventude (loan)	31	(0)
2022–	Ceará	41	(0)
- * Club domestic league appearances and goals as of 2 September 2023

Michel Macedo Rocha Machado (born 15 February 1990) is a Brazilian footballer who plays as a right back for Ceará.

== Career ==
=== Early career ===
Michel was born in Rio de Janeiro. He began his career in Soft Lazer (a futsal academy), and joined Botafogo's youth setup in 1997, aged seven. After playing for Botafogo's futsal club, he joined the football team as a right winger, but was reconverted to full-back in the process.

After impressing in a match against Flamengo in 2005, Macedo joined the latter shortly after. He was regarded as one of the best youth prospects during his time at Estádio da Gávea.

=== Almería ===
On 23 June 2008, Macedo moved to La Liga strugglers UD Almería, in a seven-year contract. He was awarded the #16 jersey.

Macedo made his debut for the Andalusians on 16 November, in a 2–1 home win against RCD Mallorca, after came off the bench to replace Juanma Ortiz in the 87th minute. His first start came on 10 May of the following year, in a 3–1 success against Sporting de Gijón also at the Estadio de los Juegos Mediterráneos; it were his two only appearances of the campaign, which the rojiblancos eventually finished 11th.

On 20 September, Macedo scored his first goal as a professional, netting the winner against Getafe CF. He was an undisputed starter during the following two seasons, but was later challenged by new signing Rafita in 2011–12, with the latter appearing in 35 matches while the former only appeared in 22, and was subsequently loaned to Atlético Mineiro in the summer.

==== Atlético Mineiro (loan) ====
On 19 July 2012, Macedo was loaned to Clube Atlético Mineiro. He expressed his desire to return to his country, after having some personal problems in Spain.

Macedo only made his league debut almost a year later, in a 0-1 away defeat against Santos FC on 13 June 2013; late in the month, the deal was renewed for another year. He finished the campaign with 16 appearances, including 72 minutes in the Copa Libertadores Final, a 2–0 home win against Olimpia, but acted mainly as a backup to Marcos Rocha.

On 7 May 2014 Macedo was released by Galo, after being deemed surplus to requirements by new manager Levir Culpi.

==== Return to Almería ====
On 9 July 2014 Macedo returned to Almería, being immediately assigned to the first-team squad. He subsequently renewed his link for a further year on the 21st.

On 23 August 2014 Macedo played his first match after his return, starting in a 1–1 home draw against RCD Espanyol.

=== Las Palmas ===
On 15 July 2016, Macedo signed a two-year deal with UD Las Palmas in the first division.

== Club statistics ==
As of 28 October 2021

Club	Season	League			State League (Note: Including Campeonato Mineiro and Campeonato Paulista.)		Cup (Note: Including Copa do Brasil and Copa del Rey.)		Continental (Note: Including Copa Libertadores and Copa Sudamericana.)		Other		Total	
Club	Season	Division	Apps	Goals	Apps	Goals	Apps	Goals	Apps	Goals	Apps	Goals	Apps	Goals
Almería	2008–09	La Liga	2	0	—		2	0	—		—		2	0
Almería	2009–10	La Liga	28	1	—		1	0	—		—		29	1
Almería	2010–11	La Liga	31	0	—		6	0	—		—		37	0
Almería	2011–12	Segunda División	22	0	—		3	0	—		—		25	0
Almería	2014–15	La Liga	14	2	—		4	1	—		—		18	3
Almería	2015–16	Segunda División	28	1	—		1	0	—		—		29	1
Almería	Total		125	4	—		17	1	—		—		142	5
Atlético Mineiro (loan)	2013	Série A	12	0	2	0	1	0	1	0	—		16	0
Atlético Mineiro (loan)	2014	Série A	0	0	7	1	0	0	—		—		7	1
Atlético Mineiro (loan)	Total		12	0	9	1	1	0	1	0	—		23	1
Las Palmas	2016–17	La Liga	25	0	—		1	0	—		—		26	0
Las Palmas	2017–18	La Liga	28	0	—		0	0	—		—		28	0
Las Palmas	Total		53	0	—		1	0	—		—		54	0
Corinthians	2019	Série A	10	1	5	0	3	0	1	0	—		19	1
Corinthians	2020	Série A	7	0	3	0	0	0	0	0	—		10	0
Corinthians	Total		17	1	8	0	3	0	1	0	—		29	1
Juventude (loan)	2021	Série A	23	0	—		—		—		—		23	0
Career totals			230	5	17	1	22	1	2	0	0	0	271	7

== Honours ==
Atlético Mineiro

- Campeonato Mineiro: 2013
- Copa Libertadores: 2013

Corinthians

- Campeonato Paulista: 2019

Ceará

- Copa do Nordeste: 2023
