= Pirmin Strasser =

Austrian footballer

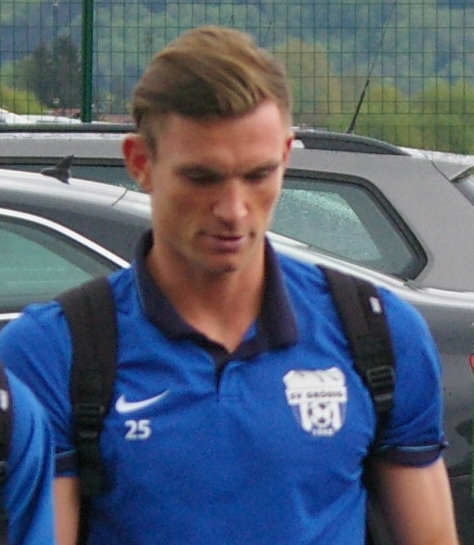
- Strasser with Grödig in 2015

Personal information
- Full name: Pirmin Franz Strasser
- Date of birth: 16 October 1990 (age 36)
- Place of birth: Linz, Austria
- Height: 1.89 m (6 ft 2 in)
- Position: Goalkeeper

Team information
- Current team: GKS Tychy

Youth career
- LASK Linz
- 2004–2005: Pasching
- 2005–2008: AKA OÖ West
- 2008–2009: Ried

Senior career*
Years	Team	Apps	(Gls)
2009–2010	Pasching	0	(0)
2010	Grödig	13	(0)
2010	Ried	0	(0)
2011–2014	Almería B	18	(0)
2014–2016	Grödig	13	(0)
2016–2017	Waitakere United	18	(0)
2017–2020	ASKÖ Oedt		
2020–2021	Hertha Wels	13	(0)
2021–2025	St. Pölten	10	(0)
2025–2026	TWL Elektra	23	(0)
2026–	GKS Tychy	0	(0)

International career
2009	Austria U19	1	(0)
2011	Austria U21	2	(0)
- * Club domestic league appearances and goals as of 19:05, 28 August 2026 (UTC)

Pirmin Franz Strasser (born 16 October 1990) is an Austrian professional footballer who plays as a goalkeeper for II liga club GKS Tychy, where he also serves as a goalkeeping coach.

== Club career ==
Born in Linz, Strasser began his career with SV Grödig in the second division. In July 2010, his contract expired and he was allowed to leave.

Strasser signed with SV Ried after two months without a club. However, he failed to make an appearance for his new team, and in early January 2011 moved to Spain, joining UD Almería and being assigned to the B-side.

In the 2011–12 season, Strasser was promoted to the Andalusians' main squad as third-choice, after the departure of Diego Alves to Valencia CF. He continued to be exclusively used by the B's in the third level during his spell, however, being released in May 2014.

On 9 May 2014, Strasser returned to his former club Grödig, replacing released Kevin Fend. He made his debut as a professional on 14 March of the following year, coming on as a substitute for injured Cican Stankovic in a 0–4 away loss against SK Rapid Wien.

On 7 January 2021, he joined St. Pölten.

== International career ==
Strasser played for Austria's under-19 team in the 2009 UEFA European Championship elite qualification, against Finland. He later appeared in two friendlies with the under-21s, against Hungary and Portugal.
