= Dani Bautista =

Spanish footballer

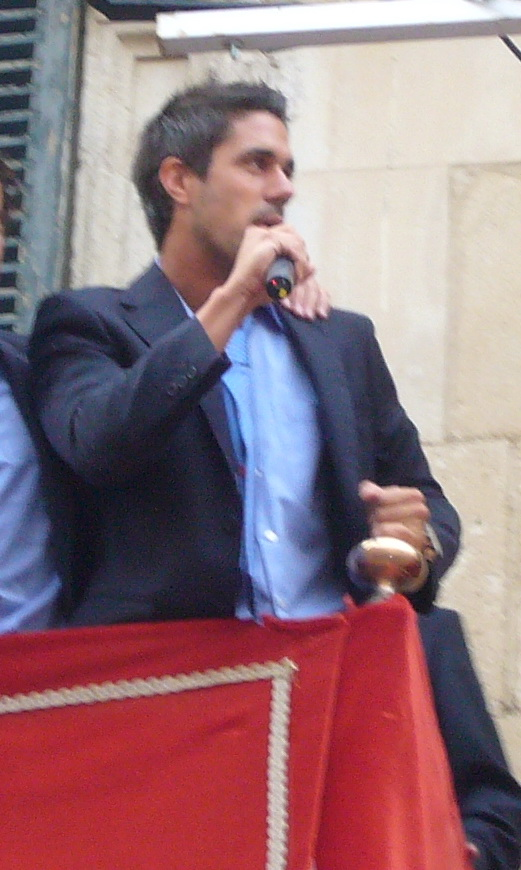
- Bautista celebrates promotion to La Liga with Hércules

Personal information
- Full name: Daniel Bautista Pina
- Date of birth: 25 February 1981 (age 45)
- Place of birth: Seville, Spain
- Height: 1.79 m (5 ft 10 1/2 in)
- Position: Left-back

Youth career
- Sevilla

Senior career*
Years	Team	Apps	(Gls)
2000–2003	Sevilla B	92	(3)
2003–2004	Eibar	29	(1)
2004	Celta	0	(0)
2005	Ciudad Murcia	16	(0)
2005–2008	Recreativo	72	(0)
2008–2010	Hércules	46	(0)
2010–2011	Girona	30	(0)
2011–2012	Almería	23	(1)
2012–2013	Racing Santander	9	(0)
2013–2014	Murcia	16	(0)
2014–2016	Oviedo	43	(0)
Total		376	(5)
- * Club domestic league appearances and goals

Daniel 'Dani' Bautista Pina (born 25 February 1981 in Seville, Andalusia) is a Spanish former professional footballer who played as a left-back.

== Honours ==
Recreativo

- Segunda División: 2005–06

Oviedo

- Segunda División B: 2014–15
