= Óscar Díaz (Spanish footballer) =

Spanish footballer (born 1984)

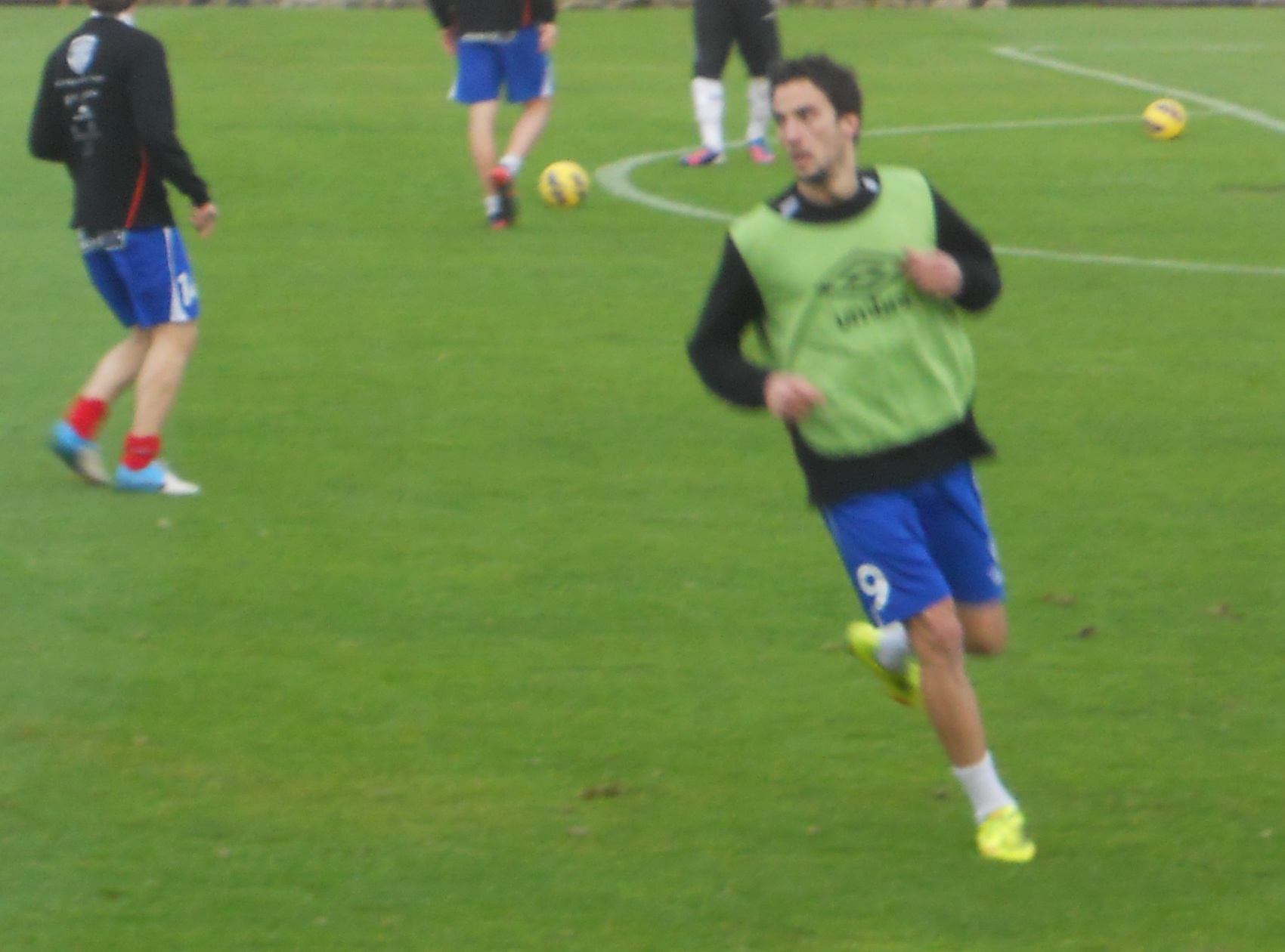
- Díaz warming up for Lugo in 2013

Personal information
- Full name: Óscar Díaz González
- Date of birth: 24 April 1984 (age 42)
- Place of birth: Madrid, Spain
- Height: 1.80 m (5 ft 11 in)
- Positions: Winger; striker

Youth career
- Alcorcón

Senior career*
| Years | Team | Apps | (Gls) |
| 2003–2004 | Alcorcón B | | |
| 2004–2005 | Alcorcón | 36 | (6) |
| 2005–2006 | Real Madrid B | 13 | (2) |
| 2006–2008 | Elche | 44 | (4) |
| 2008–2010 | Mallorca | 0 | (0) |
| 2008–2009 | → Celta (loan) | 34 | (2) |
| 2010 | → Recreativo (loan) | 16 | (0) |
| 2010–2011 | Xerez | 52 | (6) |
| 2012 | Girona | 9 | (0) |
| 2012–2013 | Lugo | 38 | (15) |
| 2013–2014 | Almería | 30 | (4) |
| 2014–2015 | Valladolid | 27 | (2) |
| 2015–2016 | Numancia | 16 | (7) |
| 2016–2017 | Mallorca | 22 | (1) |
| 2017–2018 | Hércules | 29 | (5) |
| 2018–2020 | Alcoyano | 55 | (11) |
| 2020–2021 | Eldense | 24 | (6) |
| 2021–2022 | Racing Murcia | 31 | (5) |
| 2022–2023 | Ilicitana | 23 | (2) |
| 2023–2025 | Club Costa City | 36 | (11) |
| Total | | 535 | (89) |
- * Club domestic league appearances and goals

Óscar Díaz González (born 24 April 1984) is a Spanish former professional footballer who played as a left winger or striker.

He played 271 games in the Segunda División over 11 seasons, scoring a total of 39 goals for Real Madrid Castilla, Elche, Celta, Recreativo, Xerez, Girona, Lugo, Valladolid, Numancia and Mallorca. He added 30 appearances in La Liga, with Almería.

== Club career ==
Born in Madrid, Díaz finished his development with hometown club AD Alcorcón, and made his senior debut with the reserves in the 2003–04 season. He was promoted to the first team the following year, scoring six goals in the Segunda División B.

Díaz joined local giants Real Madrid in the summer of 2005, being assigned to their reserves in the Segunda División. He played his first game as a professional on 20 December 2005 by appearing in a 0–0 home draw against UE Lleida, and scored his first goal on 15 April 2006 in the 2–1 loss at Elche CF.

On 10 July 2006, Díaz signed with fellow second-division side Elche. After losing first-choice status in his second year, he moved to RCD Mallorca in July 2008, being subsequently loaned to RC Celta de Vigo in the same league.

Díaz returned to the Balearic Islands in June 2009 but, after not being included in manager Gregorio Manzano's plans, he was loaned to Recreativo de Huelva in January 2010. He left Mallorca in June, and joined Xerez CD the following month.

After one and a half years at the Estadio Municipal de Chapín, Díaz signed with second-tier Girona FC for an undisclosed fee. He failed to make an impact for the Andalusians, terminating his contract on 26 June 2012 and joining CD Lugo a day later.

Díaz agreed to a one-year deal at La Liga club UD Almería on 28 June 2013. He made his debut in the competition on 19 August, coming on as a late substitute in a 2–3 home defeat against Villarreal CF.

In late March 2014, starting on the 24th and after 20 scoreless league appearances, Díaz scored in consecutive games: he started by contributing one goal to a 4–3 win over Real Sociedad, then netted his team's first in the 2–2 draw with Valencia CF also at the Estadio de los Juegos Mediterráneos. He added a further two during the campaign, helping to narrowly avoid relegation.

On 23 July 2014, Díaz joined Real Valladolid in the second division. He moved to CD Numancia of the same league on 15 July of the following year.

Díaz spent the second half of 2015–16 and the entire next season in the second tier with his former employers Mallorca. He scored his only goal on 28 August 2016 in a 1–1 draw away to Cádiz CF, being relegated as third-bottom.
