= Rubén Primo =

Spanish footballer (born 1990)

Personal information
- Full name: Rubén Primo Iznardo
- Date of birth: 12 April 1990 (age 36)
- Place of birth: Valencia, Spain
- Height: 1.81 m (5 ft 11 in)
- Position: Defender

Team information
- Current team: Águilas

Youth career
- Valencia

Senior career*
Years	Team	Apps	(Gls)
2009–2011	Dénia	43	(1)
2011–2013	Almería B	43	(1)
2011	Almería	0	(0)
2013–2014	Cullera	23	(2)
2014	Terracina	11	(1)
2014–2015	Noto	17	(0)
2015–2020	Águilas		
2020–2022	Atlético Pulpileño	52	(0)
2022–2023	Lorca Deportiva	29	(1)
2023–2024	Unión Molinense	31	(1)
- * Club domestic league appearances and goals

Rubén Primo Iznardo (born 12 April 1990) is a Spanish former footballer who played as a defender.

== Club career ==
Born in Valencia, Primo started playing as a senior with CD Dénia in the third division and, after two seasons with the club, signed with UD Almería, being initially assigned to the B-team also in that category. On 6 September 2011, he was called up to train with the main squad.

On 12 October 2011 Primo made his official debut with Almería's first team, starting in a 1–0 home win against Elche CF for the season's Copa del Rey and being sent off in the match. He would resume his spell with the B-side, featuring regularly.

On 16 August 2013 the free agent Primo signed with CF Cullera, in Tercera División. On 21 July of the following year he moved abroad, joining Italian Serie D side Terracina Calcio 1925.
