= Rodri (footballer, born 1990) =

Spanish footballer

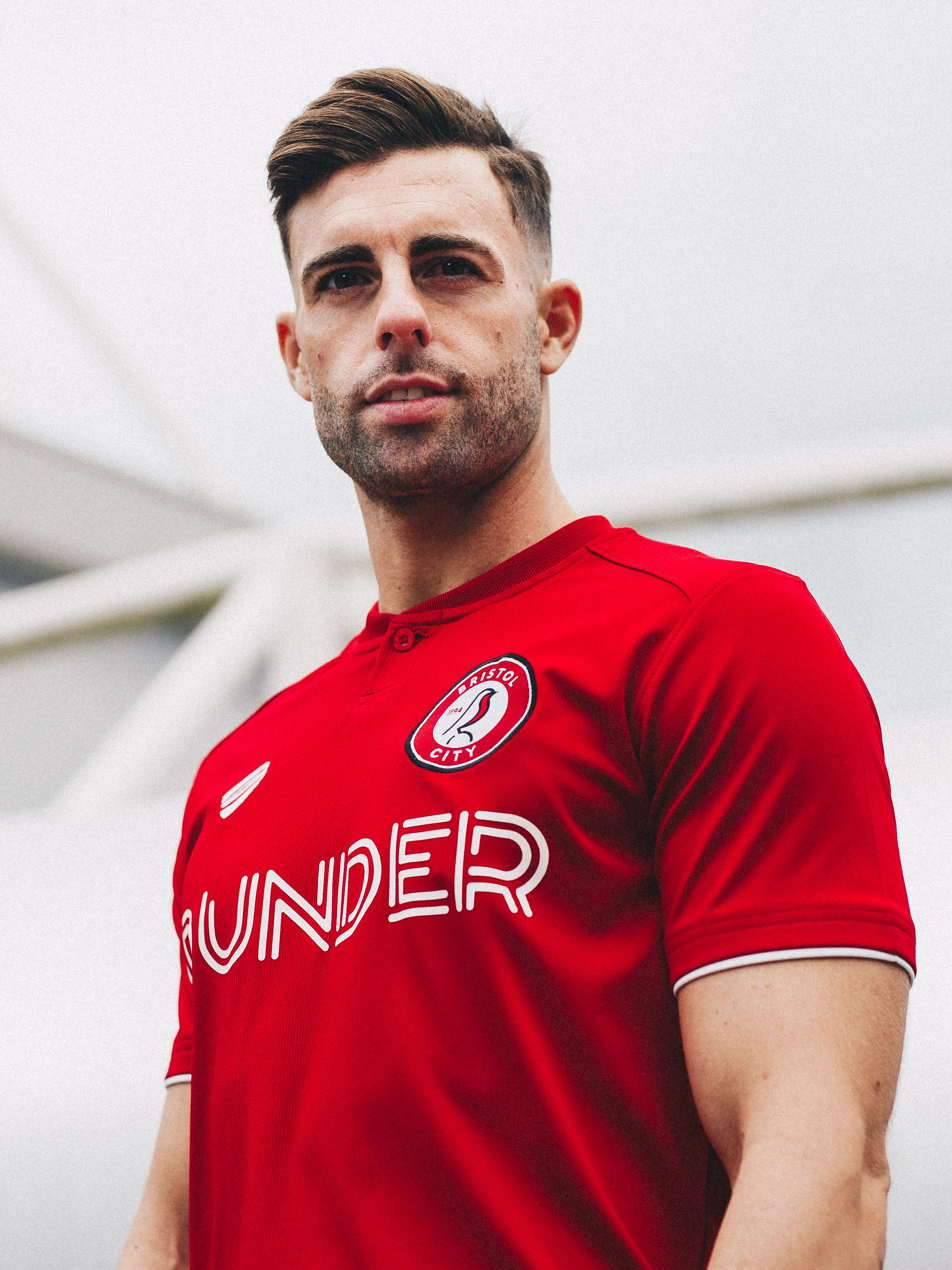
- Rodri as a Bristol City player in 2019

Personal information
- Full name: Rodrigo Ríos Lozano
- Date of birth: 6 June 1990 (age 36)
- Place of birth: Soria, Spain
- Height: 1.75 m (5 ft 9 in)
- Position: Forward

Team information
- Current team: Europa
- Number: 90

Youth career
- La Motilla
- 2007–2009: Sevilla

Senior career*
Years	Team	Apps	(Gls)
2009–2011	Sevilla B	52	(28)
2010–2011	Sevilla	7	(1)
2011–2014	Barcelona B	35	(7)
2012–2013	→ Sheffield Wednesday (loan)	11	(1)
2013	→ Zaragoza (loan)	12	(2)
2013–2014	→ Almería (loan)	27	(8)
2014–2016	1860 Munich	6	(1)
2015–2016	→ Valladolid (loan)	34	(4)
2016–2017	Córdoba	40	(11)
2017–2018	Cultural Leonesa	39	(11)
2018–2019	Granada	33	(5)
2019–2020	Bristol City	6	(0)
2020–2021	Oviedo	39	(6)
2022	Logroñés	14	(0)
2022–2023	Ceuta	24	(20)
2023–2024	Murcia	19	(4)
2024–2025	Ceuta	52	(12)
2025–2026	Marbella	21	(3)
2026	Intercity	12	(5)
2026–	Europa	4	(1)

International career
2010–2011	Spain U21	2	(1)
- * Club domestic league appearances and goals as of 21 November 2026

Rodrigo Ríos Lozano (born 6 June 1990), commonly known as Rodri, is a Spanish professional footballer who plays as a forward for Gibraltar Football League club Europa.

He achieved La Liga totals of 46 games and 11 goals for Sevilla, Zaragoza and Almería, as well as 220 matches and 44 goals in the Segunda División for six clubs. Abroad, he played in the second tiers of England for Sheffield Wednesday and Bristol City, and Germany for 1860 Munich.

== Club career ==
=== Early years ===
Born in Soria, Castile and León, Rodri grew up in Dos Hermanas, Province of Seville, where he was discovered by Sevilla FC scouts, thus entering the Andalusians' youth ranks. In 2009, he helped the Juvenil side win the Copa del Rey in the category after defeating Athletic Bilbao 3–2 in extra time, with two goals from the player.

=== Sevilla ===
Rodri played the vast majority of his first year as a senior with Sevilla Atlético, in the Segunda División B. He was first called to the first team for the 2009–10 UEFA Champions League round-of-16 tie against PFC CSKA Moscow, but did not leave the bench. Eventually, on 28 February 2010, he made his debut for the main squad – in La Liga – playing three minutes in a 0–0 home draw with Athletic Bilbao after having replaced Renato; Manolo Jiménez was the club's manager.

Rodri's second game came almost three months later, in the last round of the season, playing the last ten minutes at UD Almería: in the 93rd minute, Frédéric Kanouté passed to Jesús Navas, who crossed the ball to the box. After a failed attempt by Sébastien Squillaci, the youngster scored the 3–2 winner through a bicycle kick. With this victory, Sevilla edged RCD Mallorca for the fourth place, thus returning to the UEFA Champions League; the player's performance was subsequently praised in the local press.

=== Barcelona ===
Rodri was acquired by FC Barcelona Atlètic on 16 August 2011, signing a four-year contract. He made his official debut 11 days later, playing the full 90 minutes in a 2–0 home loss against Villarreal CF B in the Segunda División.

Rodri was loaned to Sheffield Wednesday for 2012–13, with an option to make the move permanent at the end of the campaign. He netted in his official debut, a 3–2 home win over Birmingham City in the Football League Championship.

On 31 January 2013, Rodri returned to Barcelona, being immediately loaned to Real Zaragoza for the rest of the season and with the Aragonese having the option to extend a further year. He scored the first of his two league goals on 30 March, opening the 1–1 home draw with Real Madrid, but his team eventually suffered relegation as last.

Rodri joined fellow second-division side Almería in a season-long loan on 11 July 2013. He made his debut for them on 19 August, starting and scoring twice but in a 3–2 home loss to Villarreal CF, then proceeded to net five more times in the following 12 matches, including the game's only against Real Valladolid and CA Osasuna.

On 28 November 2013, Rodri suffered an injury in his right ankle, returning to the squad weeks later. However, on 11 December he suffered a sprain in his left ankle, being again sidelined until 22 February of the following year when he played the last 19 minutes of a 0–0 home draw against Málaga CF.

=== 1860 Munich ===
Late in August 2014, Rodri joined German club TSV 1860 Munich, signing a contract until 2017. He made his 2. Bundesliga debut on 20 September, replacing compatriot Edu Bedia at the hour mark of a 1–1 home draw against FC Ingolstadt 04.

Rodri scored his first goal on 20 March 2015, after an assist by Korbinian Vollmann in a 1–1 draw with VfR Aalen also at the Allianz Arena. On 4 August, he was loaned to Real Valladolid of the Spanish second tier in a season-long deal.

=== Later career ===
On 27 July 2016, shortly after cutting ties with TSV by mutual consent, Rodri returned to his homeland and penned a one-year contract with Córdoba CF. He continued competing in the second division in the following seasons, with Cultural y Deportiva Leonesa and Granada CF.

On 16 October 2019, free agent Rodri signed a short-term deal with Bristol City lasting until January 2020, with the option of an extension until 30 June. He returned to his homeland shortly after, joining Real Oviedo of division two for six months.

After a shoulder injury in a September 2020 friendly, Rodri missed the first 13 matches of the new season for Oviedo, returning on 24 November away to CD Lugo. After six months without a team, he dropped into the third tier for the first time in 11 years, signing with UD Logroñés of the new Primera Federación for the remainder of the campaign on 31 January 2022.

Having not scored during his spell in La Rioja, Rodri remained in the same league by moving to AD Ceuta FC on 8 November 2022. He scored on his debut as a second-half substitute four days later, the only goal in the first round of the Copa del Rey at CD Utrera; he added another in a 3–2 home win over second-tier UD Ibiza in the next round and then the only one of a defeat of top-flight Elche CF also at the Estadio Alfonso Murube on 3 January, putting the club in the last 16 for the first time in their history. He ended the league season as top scorer with 20 goals from 24 games, including a hat-trick on 26 February in a 3–1 away victory against Pontevedra CF.

Rodri split the 2023–24 campaign between Real Murcia CF and Ceuta, still in division three.

In 2026, Rodri joined Gibraltarian club Europa. He made his debut on 23 October against Lynx.

== International career ==
Just two days after making his debut with Sevilla's first team, Rodri played for the first time with the Spanish under-21s.

== Career statistics ==
As of 5 July 2018

Appearances and goals by club, season and competition
Club	Season	League			National cup		Europe		Other		Total	
Club	Season	Division	Apps	Goals	Apps	Goals	Apps	Goals	Apps	Goals	Apps	Goals
Sevilla B	2009–10	Segunda División B	28	9	—		—		—		28	9
Sevilla B	2010–11	Segunda División B	24	19	—		—		2 (Note: Appearances in Segunda División B promotion play-offs)	0	26	19
Sevilla B	Total		52	28	0	0	0	0	2	0	54	28
Sevilla	2009–10	La Liga	2	1	0	0	0	0	—		2	1
Sevilla	2010–11	La Liga	5	0	3	1	1	0	0	0	9	1
Sevilla	Total		7	1	3	1	1	0	0	0	11	2
Barcelona B	2011–12	Segunda División	35	7	—		—		—		35	7
Sheffield Wednesday (loan)	2012–13	Championship	11	1	—		—		1 (Note: Appearance in Football League Cup)	0	12	1
Zaragoza (loan)	2012–13	La Liga	12	2	—		—		—		12	2
Almería (loan)	2013–14	La Liga	27	8	—		—		—		27	8
1860 Munich	2014–15	2. Bundesliga	6	1	—		—		—		6	1
Valladolid (loan)	2015–16	Segunda División	34	4	1	0	—		—		35	4
Córdoba	2016–17	Segunda División	40	11	3	1	—		—		43	12
Cultural Leonesa	2017–18	Segunda División	39	11	1	0	—		—		40	11
Career total			263	74	8	2	1	0	3	0	275	76

== Honours ==
Sevilla

- Copa del Rey: 2009–10

Ceuta

- Primera Federación: 2024–25

Individual

- Primera Federación top scorer: 2022–23
