= Marco Torsiglieri =

Argentine footballer

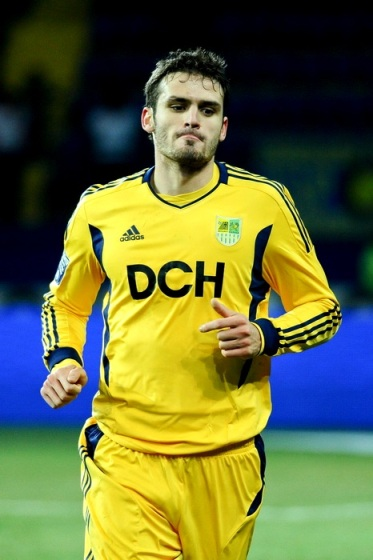
- Torsiglieri in action for Metalist in 2011

Personal information
- Full name: Marco Natanael Torsiglieri
- Date of birth: 12 January 1988 (age 38)
- Place of birth: Castelar, Argentina
- Height: 1.90 m (6 ft 3 in)
- Position: Centre back

Youth career
- 2003–2006: Vélez Sarsfield

Senior career*
Years	Team	Apps	(Gls)
2006–2010	Vélez Sarsfield	32	(1)
2007–2008	→ Talleres (C) (loan)	31	(0)
2010–2011	Sporting CP	16	(0)
2011	→ Metalist Kharkiv (loan)	16	(1)
2011–2015	Metalist Kharkiv	26	(0)
2013–2014	→ Almería (loan)	27	(1)
2015	→ Boca Juniors (loan)	12	(0)
2015–2016	Morelia	15	(0)
2016–2018	Rosario Central	6	(0)
2017	→ Racing Club (loan)	11	(1)
2018	→ Vélez Sarsfield (loan)	5	(0)
2018–2019	Lanús	20	(0)
2019	Gimnasia y Esgrima	8	(0)
2020	Wilstermann	3	(0)
- * Club domestic league appearances and goals as of 16:08, 23 August 2020 (UTC)

Marco Natanael Torsiglieri (born 12 January 1988) is an Argentine footballer who plays as a central defender or a left-back.

== Club career ==
Born in Castelar, Buenos Aires Province, Torsiglieri made his Primera División debut for Club Atlético Vélez Sarsfield on 18 November 2006, being loaned to Primera B Nacional club Talleres de Córdoba for the 2007–08 season. Returning to El Fortín he would be part of the Clausura 2009-winning squad, although he did not play in any of the games.

Torsiglieri left Vélez in June 2010 to play for Sporting Clube de Portugal, signing for €3.4 million. In July 2010, 50% of the player's rights regarding a future transfer were sold to investment group Quality Football Ireland Limited, for €1.7 million.

Torsiglieri made his official debut for Sporting on 16 September 2010, playing the full 90 minutes in a 2–1 group stage away win against Lille OSC in the UEFA Europa League. His first Primeira Liga appearance came on 24 October in a 1–0 home success over Rio Ave FC, and he finished his only season with the Lions with 23 matches all competitions comprised, with the team ranking third 36 points behind eventual champions FC Porto.

In July 2011, Torsiglieri joined FC Metalist Kharkiv on loan, and in December he signed a permanent five-year deal with the Ukrainians. On 3 August 2013, in the same predicament, he moved teams and countries again, signing a one-year deal with La Liga side UD Almería.

After spells playing for Boca Juniors, Monarcas Morelia, Rosario Central and Racing Club de Avellaneda, Torsiglieri returned to Vélez – his first professional team – for the second half of the 2017–18 season.

== Honours ==
Vélez

- Argentine Primera División: 2009 Clausura
