= Pedro Vázquez (footballer) =

Spanish footballer

Personal information
- Full name: Pedro Vázquez Viñas
- Date of birth: 19 February 1989 (age 37)
- Place of birth: Vigo, Spain
- Height: 1.70 m (5 ft 7 in)
- Position: Winger

Team information
- Current team: UMF Afturelding

Youth career
- Celta

Senior career*
Years	Team	Apps	(Gls)
2008–2011	Celta B	86	(4)
2011–2012	Villarreal B	16	(0)
2012	Orihuela	14	(0)
2013–2017	Coruxo	130	(17)
2017–2018	Melilla	35	(4)
2018–2020	Pontevedra	61	(3)
2020–2021	Coruxo	17	(1)
2021–	UMF Afturelding	27	(6)
- * Club domestic league appearances and goals as of 13 August 2022

Pedro Vázquez Viñas (born 19 February 1989 in Vigo, Galicia) is a Spanish footballer who plays for Icelandic second-tier club UMF Afturelding as a right winger.
