= Rafita (footballer, born 1982) =

Spanish footballer

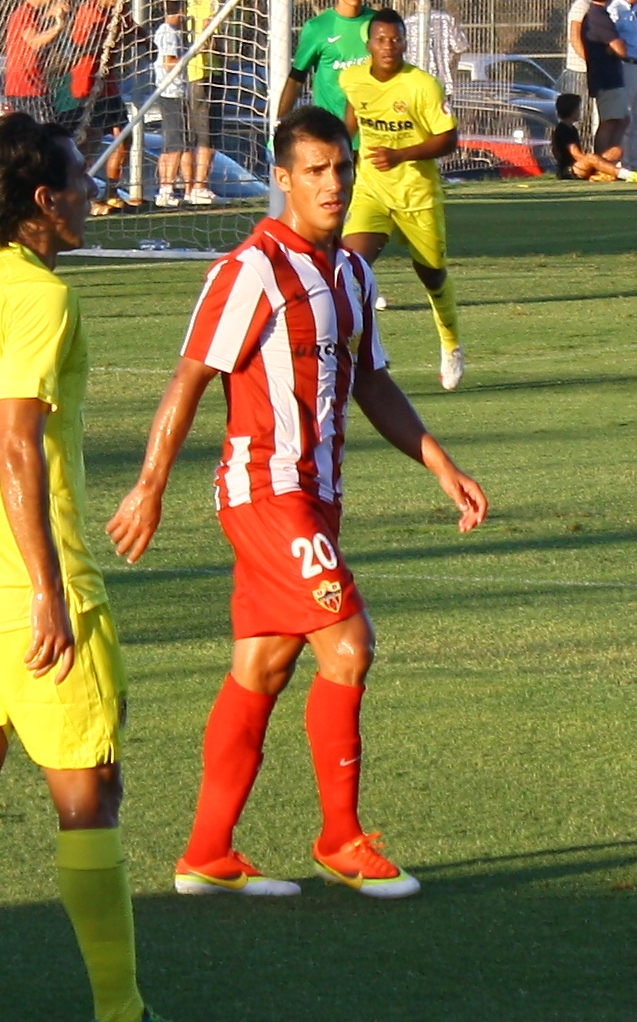
- Rafita in action for Almería in 2013

Personal information
- Full name: Rafael Ramos Lozano
- Date of birth: 18 September 1982 (age 44)
- Place of birth: Palma, Spain
- Height: 1.77 m (5 ft 10 in)
- Position: Wing-back

Youth career
- España
- Ferriolense

Senior career*
Years	Team	Apps	(Gls)
2001–2002	Ferriolense		
2002–2005	Mallorca B	100	(14)
2005–2007	Mallorca	1	(0)
2006–2007	→ Ciudad Murcia (loan)	29	(2)
2007–2010	Castellón	86	(2)
2010–2011	Recreativo	34	(2)
2011–2014	Almería	83	(1)
2014	Murcia	0	(0)
2014–2016	Hércules	47	(3)
2016	Novelda	11	(1)
2017–2019	Orihuela	83	(4)
2019–2020	Independiente Alicante	12	(0)
2021	Racing Benidorm	1	(0)
2021–2022	Calpe	4	(0)
Total		491	(29)
- * Club domestic league appearances and goals

Rafael Ramos Lozano (born 18 September 1982), known as Rafita, is a Spanish former professional footballer. On the right side of the pitch, he could play as both a defender or a midfielder.

== Club career ==
Born in Palma de Mallorca, Balearic Islands, Rafita made his senior debut with local RCD Mallorca's reserves in the Segunda División B. On 28 August 2005 he played his only competitive match with the main squad, coming on as a 73rd-minute substitute in a 0–1 La Liga home loss against Deportivo de La Coruña.

Released by the club at the end of the season, Rafita resumed his career in the Segunda División, with Ciudad de Murcia, CD Castellón, Recreativo de Huelva and UD Almería, appearing in 206 league games in the process. He achieved promotion with the latter side in 2013, totalling nearly 2,000 minutes of action while starting in all of his 22 appearances.

Rafita was challenged by new signing Nélson in the 2013–14 campaign, but again contributed solidly (26 matches) as the Andalusians retained their recently-acquired status. He subsequently took his game to the lower leagues, where he represented Hércules CF, Novelda CF and Orihuela CF.
