= 2010–11 RCD Mallorca season =

RCD Mallorca
2010–11 season
- Chairman: Jaume Cladera
- Manager: Michael Laudrup
- Stadium: Iberostar Stadium
- La Liga: 17th
- Copa del Rey: Round of 16
Home colours	Away colours

During the 2010–11 Spanish football season, RCD Mallorca competed in La Liga.

== Season summary ==
Danish coach Michael Laudrup was appointed as head coach. Despite the club's financial difficulties, the club avoided relegation by one point.

== Kit ==
Mallorca's kits were manufactured by Italian sportswear company Macron and sponsored by Austrian online gambling company bet-at-home.com.

== First-team squad ==
Squad at end of season

Note: Flags indicate national team as defined under FIFA eligibility rules; some limited exceptions apply. Players may hold more than one non-FIFA nationality.

No.	Pos.	Nation	Player
1	GK	ARG	Germán Lux
3	MF	BRA	João Victor
4	DF	ESP	Iván Ramis
5	DF	ESP	Rubén
7	MF	FRA	Michaël Pereira
8	DF	ESP	Emilio Nsue (Note: Nsue was born in Palma, Spain, and represented them from U-16 to U-21 level, but also qualified to represent Equatorial Guinea internationally through his father and would make his international debut for Equatorial Guinea in March 2013.)
9	FW	CMR	Pierre Webó
11	MF	URU	Chory Castro
13	GK	ISR	Dudu Aouate
14	MF	JPN	Akihiro Ienaga
16	DF	POR	José Nunes (captain)
17	DF	ESP	Ayoze
18	FW	ESP	Víctor

No.	Pos.	Nation	Player
19	MF	ESP	José Luis Martí
20	MF	NED	Jonathan de Guzmán (Note: De Guzmán was born in Scarborough, Canada, but would later become qualified to represent the Netherlands internationally after gaining citizenship in 2008 and would make his international debut for the Netherlands in January 2013.)
21	DF	ESP	Martí Crespí
22	DF	ESP	Pau Cendrós
23	DF	ESP	Enrique Corrales
26	FW	ESP	Sergi Enrich
27	MF	ESP	Sergio Tejera
28	MF	ESP	Tomás Pina Isla
29	DF	ESP	Kevin
30	GK	ESP	Tomeu Nadal
31	DF	ESP	Abdón
33	DF	ESP	Ximo Navarro

=== Left club during season ===
Note: Flags indicate national team as defined under FIFA eligibility rules; some limited exceptions apply. Players may hold more than one non-FIFA nationality.

No.	Pos.	Nation	Player
2	DF	BRA	Edson Ratinho (on loan to São Paulo)
10	FW	ARG	Fernando Cavenaghi (on loan from Bordeaux)

No.	Pos.	Nation	Player
15	MF	ESP	Tuni (on loan to Gimnàstic de Tarragona)

== Competitions ==
=== La Liga ===
==== League table ====
Pos	Team	Pld	W	D	L	GF	GA	GD	Pts	Qualification or relegation
15	Real Sociedad	38	14	3	21	49	66	−17	45 (Note: ZAR: 9 pts; LEV: 4 pts → LEV 2–1 RSO; RSO: 4 pts → RSO 1–1 LEV)	
16	Getafe	38	12	8	18	49	60	−11	44 (Note: GET 3–0 MLL; MLL 2–0 GET)	
17	Mallorca	38	12	8	18	41	56	−15	44	
18	Deportivo La Coruña (R)	38	10	13	15	31	47	−16	43	Relegation to the Segunda División
19	Hércules (R)	38	9	8	21	36	60	−24	35	Relegation to the Segunda División

Source: LFP, sportec.es, Yahoo! Sport
Rules for classification: 1st points; 2nd head-to-head points; 3rd head-to-head goal difference; 4th head-to-head goals scored; 5th goal difference; 6th number of goals scored; 7th Fair-play points
(R) Relegated
