= 2008–09 FC Barcelona season =

110th season in existence of FC Barcelona

Barcelona
2008–09 season
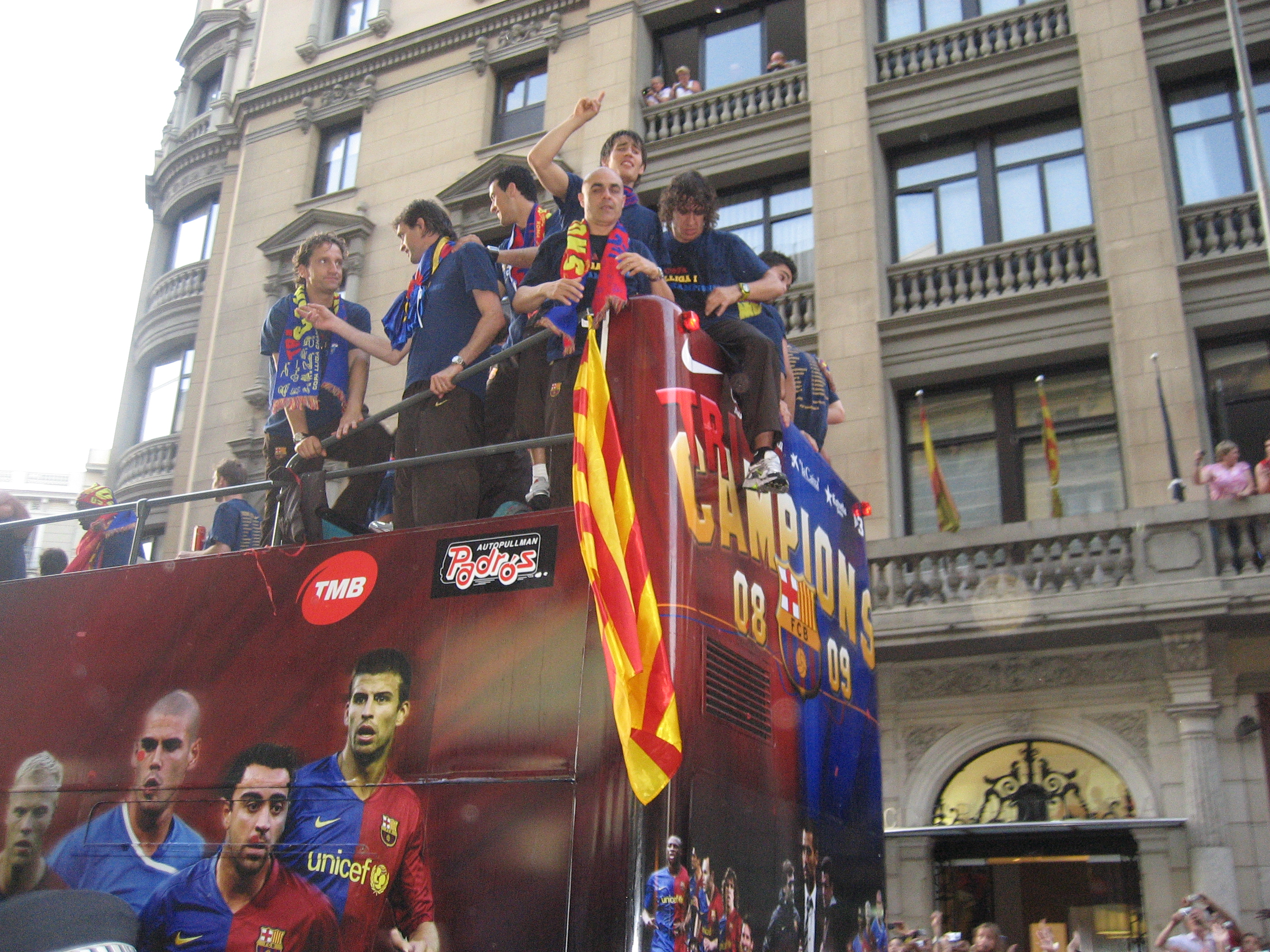
- FC Barcelona players celebrating their historic treble-winning campaign, 28 May 2009
- President: Joan Laporta
- Head coach: Pep Guardiola
- Stadium: Camp Nou
- La Liga: 1st
- Copa del Rey: Winners
- UEFA Champions League: Winners
- Top goalscorer: League: Samuel Eto'o (30); All: Lionel Messi (38)
- Biggest win: Barcelona 6–0 Malaga
- Biggest defeat: Atlético Madrid 4–3 Barcelona
Home colours	Away colours	Third colours

In 2008–09, FC Barcelona started a new era with a new manager, former captain and Barcelona B coach Pep Guardiola, who led the team to the first treble in Spanish football history. After selling high-profile players such as Deco and Ronaldinho, Barcelona went on to win the Copa del Rey, La Liga, and UEFA Champions League. This team is widely regarded as one of the greatest teams in football history.

== Pre-season and friendlies ==
24 July 2008 Friendly	Hibernian	0–6	Barcelona	Edinburgh, Scotland
19:45 BST		Report	Guðjohnsen 5', 17'; Messi 15'; Pedro 27'; Bojan 48'; Touré 69'	Stadium: Murrayfield Stadium; Attendance: 23,390; Referee: Craig Thomson (Scotland)

26 July 2008 Friendly	Dundee United	1–5	Barcelona	Dundee, Scotland
16:00 BST	Buaben 26'	Report	Henry 27'; Messi 51', 75', 78'; Eto'o 61'	Stadium: Tannadice Park; Attendance: 13,000; Referee: Dougie McDonald (Scotland)

30 July 2008 Memorial Artemio Franchi	Fiorentina	1–3	Barcelona	Florence, Italy
20:45 CEST	Pazzini 68'	Report	Touré (yellow card) 10'; Puyol 28'; Jeffrén 47'; Bojan 72'	Stadium: Stadio Artemio Franchi; Attendance: 40,428; Referee: Saccanni Dimantova (Italy)

3 August 2008 US Tour	Guadalajara	2–5	Barcelona	Chicago, United States
18:00 CDT	Padilla 58'; Araujo (yellow card) 69'; Hernández 88'	Report	Xavi 25'; Hleb 45'; Eto'o 48', 72'; Bojan (yellow card) 55'; Cáceres 89'	Stadium: Soldier Field; Attendance: 40,717; Referee: Alex Prus

6 August 2008 US Tour	New York Red Bulls	2–6	Barcelona	East Rutherford, New Jersey, United States
19:00 EST	Stammler 30'; Rojas 60'	Report	Xavi 17'; Eto'o 18', 43'; Márquez 24'; Jeffrén 80'; Pedro 85'	Stadium: Giants Stadium; Attendance: 38,152; Referee: Kevin Stott

16 August 2008 Joan Gamper Trophy	Boca Juniors	1–2	Barcelona	Barcelona, Spain
22:00 CEST	Castromán (yellow card) 44'; Vargas (yellow card) 52'; Roncaglia (yellow card) 55'; Viatri 72'	Report	Córcoles (yellow card) 30'; Busquets (yellow card) 57'; Piqué (yellow card) 89'; Puyol 90+2'; Eto'o 90+5'	Stadium: Camp Nou; Attendance: 71,210; Referee: González Vázquez

9 September 2008 Semi-finals	Sant Andreu	3–1	Barcelona	La Ràpita, Spain
	Oriol 9', 77'; Martí 28'	Report	Busquets 20'	Stadium: La Devesa; Referee: Del Pino

Source : FC Barcelona

== Players ==
=== Squad information ===
N	Pos.	Nat.	Name	Age	EU	Since	App	Goals	Ends	Transfer fee	Notes
1	GK	(Spain)	Víctor Valdés (VC)	27	EU	2002	260	0	2010	Youth system	
2	DF	(Uruguay)	Martín Cáceres	22	Non-EU	2008	0	0	2012	€16.5M	
3	DF	(Spain)	Gerard Piqué	22	EU	2008	0	0	2012	Youth system	Bought from Manchester United for €5M
4	DF	(Mexico)	Rafael Márquez	30	EU	2003	200	8	2012	€5M	
5	DF	(Spain)	Carles Puyol (captain)	31	EU	1999	270	4	2010	Youth system	
6	MF	(Spain)	Xavi (VC)	29	EU	1998	288	28	2014	Youth system	
7	FW	(Iceland)	Eiður Guðjohnsen	30	EU	2006	72	13	2010	€12M	
8	MF	(Spain)	Andrés Iniesta (VC)	25	EU	2002	211	17	2014	Youth system	
9	FW	(Cameroon)	Samuel Eto'o	28	EU	2004	108	78	2010	€27M	
10	FW	(Argentina)	Lionel Messi	21	EU	2004	109	54	2014	Youth system	
11	FW	(Spain)	Bojan	18	EU	2007	54	12	2013	Youth system	
13	GK	(Spain)	José Manuel Pinto	33	EU	2008	3	0	2010	€0.5M	
14	FW	(France)	Thierry Henry	31	EU	2007	59	31	2011	€24M	
15	MF	(Mali)	Seydou Keita	29	EU	2008	0	0	2012	€14M	
16	DF	(Brazil)	Sylvinho	35	EU	2004	92	3	2009	€2M	
18	DF	(Argentina)	Gabriel Milito	28	EU	2007	27	1	2011	€17M	
20	DF	(Brazil)	Dani Alves	26	EU	2008	0	0	2012	€29M	
21	MF	(Belarus)	Alexander Hleb	28	Non-EU	2008	0	0	2012	€15M	
22	DF	(France)	Eric Abidal	29	EU	2007	40	0	2011	€15M	
24	MF	(Ivory Coast)	Yaya Touré	26	Non-EU	2007	32	2	2012	€9M	Under Bosman ruling
25	GK	(Spain)	Albert Jorquera	30	EU	2003	17	0	2010	Youth system	
27	FW	(Spain)	Pedro	21	EU	2008	2	0	Undisclosed	Youth system	
28	MF	(Spain)	Sergio Busquets	20	EU	2008	0	0	2013	Youth system	
29	DF	(Spain)	Víctor Sánchez	21	EU	2008	0	0	Undisclosed	Youth system	

- Source: FC Barcelona and footballdatabase.com

=== Players in and out ===
==== In ====
No.	Pos.	Nat.	Name	Age	EU	Moving from	Type	Transfer window	Ends	Transfer fee	Source
15	MF	(Mali)	Keita	28	EU	Sevilla	Transfer ✓	Summer	2012	€14M	Barcelona.cat
3	DF	(Spain)	Piqué	21	EU	Manchester United (England)	Transfer ✓	Summer	2012	€5M	Barcelona.cat
13	GK	(Spain)	Pinto	32	EU	Celta de Vigo	Transfer ✓	Summer	2010	€0.5M	Barcelona.cat
2	DF	(Uruguay)	Cáceres	21	Non-EU	Villarreal	Transfer ✓	Summer	2012	€16.5M	Barcelona.cat
20	DF	(Brazil)	Alves	25	EU	Sevilla	Transfer ✓	Summer	2012	€29M + €6M in variables	Barcelona.cat
21	MF	(Belarus)	Hleb	27	Non-EU	Arsenal (England)	Transfer ✓	Summer	2012	€11.8M	Barcelona.cat
12	DF	(Brazil)	Henrique	21	Non-EU	Palmeiras (Brazil)	Transfer ✓	Summer	2013	€8M + €2M in variables	Barcelona.cat
28	MF	(Spain)	Busquets	20	EU	Barcelona B	Promote	Summer	2013	Free	

Total spending: ▼€88M

==== Out ====
No.	Pos.	Nat.	Name	Age	EU	Moving to	Type	Transfer window	Transfer fee	Source
15	DF	(Brazil)	Edmílson	31	EU	Villarreal	Contract Termination ✗	Summer	Free	Barcelona.cat
11	DF	(Italy)	Zambrotta	31	EU	Milan (Italy)	Transfer ✓	Summer	€9M + €2M in variables	Barcelona.cat
17	FW	(Mexico)	Dos Santos	19	EU	Tottenham Hotspur (England)	Transfer ✓	Summer	€6M + €5M in variables	Barcelona.cat
21	DF	(France)	Thuram	36	EU	Retired	Contract Termination ✗	Summer	Free	Barcelona.cat
18	FW	(Spain)	Ezquerro	31	EU	Osasuna	Contract Termination ✗	Summer	Free	Barcelona.cat
20	MF	(Portugal)	Deco	30	EU	Chelsea (England)	Transfer ✓	Summer	€10M	Barcelona.cat
10	FW	(Brazil)	Ronaldinho	28	EU	Milan (Italy)	Transfer ✓	Summer	€21M + €4M in variables	Barcelona.cat
12	DF	(Brazil)	Henrique	21	Non-EU	Bayer Leverkusen (Germany)	Loan →	Summer	N/A	Barcelona.cat
23	DF	(Spain)	Oleguer	28	EU	Ajax (Netherlands)	Transfer ✓	Summer	€3M + €2.25M in variables	Barcelona.cat
26	MF	(Spain)	Crosas	20	EU	Celtic (Scotland)	Transfer ✓	Summer	€0.5M + €0.8M in variables	Barcelona.cat

Total income: ▲€49.5M

=== Squad stats ===
				Total			Champions League		La Liga		Copa del Rey		Copa Catalunya	
No.	Pos.	Nat.	Name	Sts	App	Gls	App	Gls	App	Gls	App	Gls	App	Gls
1	GK	(Spain)	V. Valdés	49	49		14		35					
20	DF	(Brazil)	Dani Alves	52	54	5	12		34	5	8			
5	DF	(Spain)	Puyol	41	45	1	11		28	1	6			
3	DF	(Spain)	Piqué	44	45	3	14	1	25	1	6	1		
22	DF	(France)	Abidal	31	32		5		25		2			
24	MF	(Ivory Coast)	Touré Yaya	39	43	3	12		25	2	6	1		
6	MF	(Spain)	Xavi	49	54	10	14	3	35	6	5	1		
8	MF	(Spain)	A. Iniesta	38	43	5	11	1	26	4	6			
10	FW	(Argentina)	Messi	41	51	38	12	9	31	23	8	6		
9	FW	(Cameroon)	Eto'o	46	52	36	12	6	36	30	4			
14	FW	(France)	Henry	36	42	26	12	6	29	19	1	1		
13	GK	(Spain)	Pinto	11	11				2		9			
25	GK	(Spain)	Jorquera	1	1		1							
41	GK	(Spain)	Oier	1	1				1					
2	DF	(Uruguay)	M. Cáceres	16	23		3		13		7			
4	DF	(Mexico)	Márquez	36	37	3	10	1	23	1	4	1		
16	DF	(Brazil)	Sylvinho	22	30	1	7	1	15		8			
18	DF	(Argentina)	Milito											
29	DF	(Spain)	V. Sánchez	6	12		3		7		2			
37	DF	(Spain)	Botía		1				1					
46	DF	(Spain)	Muniesa		1				1					
15	MF	(Mali)	Keita	29	46	6	12	2	29	4	5			
21	MF	(Belarus)	Hleb	19	36		9		19		8			
28	MF	(Spain)	Sergio B.	31	41	3	8	2	24	1	9			
30	MF	(Spain)	Vázquez	1	1		1							
35	MF	(Spain)	Abraham		2				1		1			
44	MF	(Spain)	Thiago		1				1					
45	MF	(Spain)	Xavi Torres	2	2				2					
7	FW	(Iceland)	Gudjohnsen	17	34	4	5		24	3	5	1		
11	FW	(Spain)	Bojan	18	42	10	10	3	23	2	9	5		
27	FW	(Spain)	Pedro	6	14		5		6		3			
31	FW	(Venezuela)	Jeffrén		2				2					

Source: Competitive matches
Ordered by position and then numbers
0 shown as blank

=== Disciplinary record ===
N	Pos.	Nat.	Name	Yellow card	Second yellow card	Red card	Notes
1	GK	(Spain)	V. Valdés	2	0	2	
13	GK	(Spain)	Pinto	1	0	0	
20	DF	(Brazil)	Dani Alves	8	0	0	
3	DF	(Spain)	Piqué	10	2	0	
4	DF	(Mexico)	Márquez	8	1	0	
5	DF	(Spain)	Puyol	4	0	0	
22	DF	(France)	Abidal	3	0	2	
2	DF	(Uruguay)	M. Cáceres	3	0	1	
24	MF	(Ivory Coast)	Touré Yaya	7	0	0	
6	MF	(Spain)	Xavi	5	0	0	
28	MF	(Spain)	Busquets	12	0	0	
8	MF	(Spain)	A. Iniesta	3	0	0	
15	MF	(Mali)	Keita	1	0	1	
29	MF	(Spain)	V. Sánchez	1	0	0	
9	FW	(Cameroon)	Eto'o	9	0	0	
14	FW	(France)	Henry	5	0	0	
11	FW	(Spain)	Bojan	1	0	0	
10	FW	(Argentina)	Messi	2	0	0	
7	FW	(Iceland)	Gudjohnsen	1	0	0	

Source: Competitive matches
Only competitive matches
(yellow card) = Number of bookings; (second yellow card) = Number of sending offs after a second yellow card; (red card) = Number of sending offs by a direct red card.

== Club ==
=== Coaching staff ===
Position	Staff
Head coach	(Spain) Pep Guardiola
Assistant coach	(Spain) Tito Vilanova
Goalkeeping coach	(Spain) Juan Carlos Unzué
Physical fitness coach	(Spain) Lorenzo Buenaventura
Lead fitness coach	(Spain) Paco Seirul·lo
Field work	(Spain) Aureli Altimira
Strength work	(Spain) Francesc Cos

Source: FC Barcelona

== Competitions ==
=== Overall ===
As in nine out of the last ten seasons, Barcelona was present in all major competitions. First division and Copa del Rey in Spain and UEFA Champions League in Europe.

Competition	Started round	Final position / round	First match	Last match
La Liga	—	Winner	31 August 2008	31 May 2009
Champions League	Third qualifying round	Winner	13 August 2008	27 May 2009
Copa del Rey	Round of 32	Winner	28 October 2008	13 May 2009

Source: Competitions

=== La Liga ===
==== League table ====
Pos	Team	Pld	W	D	L	GF	GA	GD	Pts	Qualification or relegation
1	Barcelona (C)	38	27	6	5	105	35	+70	87	Qualification for the Champions League group stage
2	Real Madrid	38	25	3	10	83	52	+31	78	Qualification for the Champions League group stage
3	Sevilla	38	21	7	10	54	39	+15	70	Qualification for the Champions League group stage
4	Atlético Madrid	38	20	7	11	80	57	+23	67	Qualification for the Champions League play-off round
5	Villarreal	38	18	11	9	61	54	+7	65	Qualification for the Europa League play-off round

Source: LFP and Yahoo! Sport
Rules for classification: 1) points; 2) head-to-head points; 3) head-to-head goal difference; 4) head-to-head goals scored; 5) goal difference; 6) number of goals scored.
(C) Champions

==== Results summary ====
Overall								Home						Away					
Pld	W	D	L	GF	GA	GD	Pts	W	D	L	GF	GA	GD	W	D	L	GF	GA	GD
38	27	6	5	105	35	+70	87	14	3	2	61	14	+47	13	3	3	44	21	+23

Last updated: 8 May.
Source: Competitive Matches

==== Results by round ====
Round	1	2	3	4	5	6	7	8	9	10	11	12	13	14	15	16	17	18	19	20	21	22	23	24	25	26	27	28	29	30	31	32	33	34	35	36	37	38
Ground	A	H	A	H	A	H	A	H	A	H	A	H	A	H	H	A	H	A	H	H	A	H	A	H	A	H	A	H	A	H	A	H	A	A	H	A	H	A
Result	L	D	W	W	W	W	W	W	W	W	W	D	W	W	W	W	W	W	W	W	W	W	D	L	L	W	W	W	W	W	W	W	D	W	D	L	L	D
Position	17	15	9	6	5	4	4	2	1	1	1	1	1	1	1	1	1	1	1	1	1	1	1	1	1	1	1	1	1	1	1	1	1	1	1	1	1	1

Source: Competitive Matches
A = Away; H = Home; W = Win; D = Draw; L = Loss

==== Matches ====
All kickoff times are in CEST. Win Draw Loss

31 August 2008 1	Numancia	1–0	Barcelona	Soria
19:00 CEST	Mario 13'	(Report)	Puyol (yellow card) 42'; Eto'o (yellow card) 80'	Stadium: Los Pajaritos; Attendance: 9,500; Referee: David Fernández Borbalán

13 September 2008 2	Barcelona	1–1	Racing Santander	Barcelona
20:00 CEST	Messi 71' (pen.); Iniesta (yellow card) 87'	(Report)	Pinillos (yellow card) 37'; Munitis (yellow card) 60'; Serrano (yellow card) 62'; Lacen (yellow card) 66'; Christian (yellow card) 70'; Jonathan 77'; Valera (yellow card) 88'; Luccin (yellow card) 92'	Stadium: Camp Nou; Attendance: 54,678; Referee: Rafael Ramírez Domínguez

21 September 2008 3	Sporting Gijón	1–6	Barcelona	Gijón
21:00 CEST	Cámara (yellow card) 7'; Carmelo (yellow card) 41'; Maldonado 50'; Gerard (red card) 56'	(Report)	Xavi 27'; Eto'o 33'; Jorge 49' (o.g.); Iniesta 70'; Messi 85', 90'	Stadium: El Molinón; Attendance: 23,481; Referee: Carlos Megía Dávila

24 September 2008 4	Barcelona	3–2	Real Betis	Barcelona
20:00 CEST	Touré (yellow card) 13'; Eto'o 17', 23'; Guðjohnsen 80'; Busquets (yellow card) 84'	(Report)	Vega (yellow card) 43'; Monzón 59'; José Mari 67'; Capi (yellow card) 73'; Aurélio (yellow card) 85'	Stadium: Camp Nou; Attendance: 55,727; Referee: Arturo Daudén Ibáñez

27 September 2008 5	Espanyol	1–2	Barcelona	Barcelona
22:00 CEST	Nenê (yellow card) 12' (yellow-red card) 45'; Coro 20'; Martínez (yellow card) 53'; Chica (yellow card) 55'; Jarque (yellow card) 90+8'	(Report)	Busquets (yellow card) 6'; Valdés (yellow card) 20'; Henry 84'; Messi 90+13' (pen.)	Stadium: Estadi Olímpic Lluís Companys; Attendance: 31,660; Referee: Luis Medina Cantalejo

4 October 2008 6	Barcelona	6–1	Atlético Madrid	Barcelona
22:00 CEST	Márquez 3', (yellow card) 54'; Eto'o 5' (pen.), 17'; Messi 8'; Guðjohnsen 28'; Henry (yellow card) 62', (goal) 72'	(Report)	Rodríguez (yellow card) 9', (goal) 13'; López (yellow card) 32'; Heitinga (yellow card) 33'; Ujfaluši (yellow card) 52'	Stadium: Camp Nou; Attendance: 75,232; Referee: Eduardo Iturralde González

19 October 2008 7	Athletic Bilbao	0–1	Barcelona	Bilbao
19:00 CEST	Amorebieta (yellow card) 39'; Orbaiz (yellow card) 49'; Balenziaga (yellow card) 79'	(Report)	Márquez (yellow card) 50'; Eto'o 63', (yellow card) 90'; Busquets (yellow card) 89'	Stadium: San Mamés; Attendance: 40,000; Referee: Alberto Undiano Mallenco

25 October 2008 8	Barcelona	5–0	Almería	Barcelona
22:00 CEST	Eto'o 5', 20', 23'; Henry 13'; Alves 36'	(Report)	Negredo (red card) 28'; Crusat (yellow card) 29'; Ortiz (yellow card) 43'; Soriano (yellow card) 80'	Stadium: Camp Nou; Attendance: 63,566; Referee: Alfonso Pérez Burrull

1 November 2008 9	Málaga	1–4	Barcelona	Málaga
20:00 CEST	Apoño (yellow card) 4'; Baha (yellow card) 7'; Duda 12'	(Report)	Xavi 5', 53'; Messi 19'; Alves (yellow card) 54'; Touré (yellow card) 75'; Busquets (yellow card) 79'; Weligton 80' (o.g.)	Stadium: La Rosaleda; Attendance: 22,800; Referee: Carlos Velasco Carballo

8 November 2008 10	Barcelona	6–0	Real Valladolid	Barcelona
22:00 CET	Eto'o 12', 30', 42', 44'; Touré (yellow card) 20'; Guðjohnsen 71'; Henry 83'	(Report)	Dorado (yellow card) 74'	Stadium: Camp Nou; Attendance: 58,276; Referee: Fernando Teixeira Vitienes

16 November 2008 11	Recreativo Huelva	0–2	Barcelona	Huelva
21:00 CET	Sisi (yellow card) 37'; Arzo (yellow card) 71'; Beto (yellow card) 90+1'	(Report)	Alves (yellow card) 32'; Messi 50'; Eto'o (yellow card) 71'; Keita 85'	Stadium: Nuevo Colombino; Attendance: 19,860; Referee: Miguel Ángel Pérez Lasa

23 November 2008 12	Barcelona	1–1	Getafe	Barcelona
19:00 CET	Alves (yellow card) 6'; Eto'o (yellow card) 65'; Keita 71'; Puyol (yellow card) 91'	(Report)	Manu 19'; Gavilán (yellow card) 22'; Granero (yellow card) 30'; Licht (yellow card) 41'; Rafa (yellow card) 90'	Stadium: Camp Nou; Attendance: 65,249; Referee: Bernardino González Vázquez

29 November 2008 13	Sevilla	0–3	Barcelona	Seville
22:00 CET	Luís Fabiano (red card) 86'	(Report)	Eto'o 20', (yellow card) 30'; Márquez (yellow card) 62'; Piqué (yellow card) 76'; Messi 71', 90+2'	Stadium: Ramón Sánchez Pizjuán; Attendance: 45,500; Referee: Alberto Undiano Mallenco

6 December 2008 14	Barcelona	4–0	Valencia	Barcelona
22:00 CET	Henry 20', 28', 79'; Alves 46'	(Report)	Albiol (yellow card) 6'; Albelda (yellow card) 38'; Villa (yellow card) 67'; Miguel (yellow card) 72'; Del Horno (yellow card) 73'	Stadium: Camp Nou; Attendance: 82,889; Referee: David Fernández Borbalán

13 December 2008 15	Barcelona	2–0	Real Madrid	Barcelona
22:00 CET	Márquez (yellow card) 40'; Eto'o 83', (yellow card) 84'; Messi 90', (yellow card) 90+1'	(Report)	Metzelder (yellow card) 21'; Ramos (yellow card) 26'; Drenthe (yellow card) 41'; Salgado (yellow card) 68'; Casillas (yellow card) 90'	Stadium: Camp Nou; Attendance: 96,059; Referee: Luis Medina Cantalejo

21 December 2008 16	Villarreal	1–2	Barcelona	Villarreal
19:00 CET	Cani 47'; Franco (yellow card) 79'; Pires (yellow card) 87'; Cazorla (yellow card) 88'	(Report)	Keita 54'; Henry 66'; Piqué (yellow card) 70' (yellow-red card) 74'; Puyol (yellow card) 75'; Xavi (yellow card) 75'	Stadium: Estadio El Madrigal; Attendance: 23,000; Referee: Carlos Clos Gómez

3 January 2009 17	Barcelona	3–1	Mallorca	Barcelona
20:00 CET	Henry 30', (yellow card) 36'; Márquez (yellow card) 49'; Xavi (yellow card) 64'; Alves (yellow card) 73'; Iniesta 75'; Touré 90+2'	Report	Aduriz 15', (yellow card) 57'; Josemi (yellow card) 36' (yellow-red card) 90'; Suárez (yellow card) 43'; Lux (yellow card) 68'; Varela (yellow card) 73'; Arango (yellow card) 75'	Stadium: Camp Nou; Attendance: 60,399; Referee: Carlos Velasco Carballo

11 January 2009 18	Osasuna	2–3	Barcelona	Pamplona
21:00 CET	Flaño 62'; Josetxo (yellow card) 69'; Pandiani 72'	(Report)	Abidal (yellow card) 32'; Eto'o 44'; Valdés (yellow card) 69'; Xavi 80'; Messi 84'; Busquets (yellow card) 90+3'	Stadium: El Sadar; Attendance: 19,800; Referee: Fernando Teixeira Vitienes

17 January 2009 19	Barcelona	5–0	Deportivo La Coruña	Barcelona
20:00 CET	Messi 21'; Henry 27', 82'; Eto'o 41', 86' (pen.)	(Report)	Aranzubia (red card) 84'	Stadium: Camp Nou; Attendance: 65,145; Referee: Julián Rodríguez Santiago

24 January 2009 20	Barcelona	4–1	Numancia	Barcelona
22:00 CET	Xavi (yellow card) 24'; Messi 49', 75'; Eto'o 52'; Piqué (yellow card) 65'; Henry 70'	(Report)	Dimas (yellow card) 23'; Barkero 60'; Palacios (yellow card) 58' (yellow-red card) 80'; Del Pino (yellow card) 81'; Ortega (yellow card) 90'	Stadium: Camp Nou; Attendance: 47,330; Referee: Miguel Ángel Pérez Lasa

1 February 2009 21	Racing Santander	1–2	Barcelona	Santander
17:00 CET	Munitis (yellow card) 22'; Žigić (yellow card) 31', (goal) 55' (pen.)	(Report)	Messi 65', 80'; Alves (yellow card) 76'; Márquez (yellow card) 54' (yellow-red card) 87'; Piqué (yellow card) 31' (yellow-red card) 90+3'	Stadium: Campos de Sport de El Sardinero; Attendance: 22,251; Referee: David Fernández Borbalán

8 February 2009 22	Barcelona	3–1	Sporting Gijón	Barcelona
19:00 CET	Eto'o 23', 40'; Abidal (yellow card) 45'; Henry (yellow card) 56'; Alves 65'	(Report)	Gerard (yellow card) 10'; Matabuena (yellow card) 37'; Mateo 67'; Míchel (yellow card) 73'	Stadium: Camp Nou; Attendance: 69,341; Referee: Antonio Rubinos Pérez

14 February 2009 23	Real Betis	2–2	Barcelona	Seville
20:00 CET	Oliveira (yellow card) 17'; Melli 18'; González 24'; Emaná (yellow card) 45'; Juanma (yellow card) 82'	(Report)	Piqué (yellow card) 35'; Eto'o 45+3', 84'; Busquets (yellow card) 76'	Stadium: Manuel Ruiz de Lopera; Attendance: 55,500; Referee: Eduardo Iturralde González

21 February 2009 24	Barcelona	1–2	Espanyol	Barcelona
20:00 CET	Piqué (yellow card) 21'; Keita (red card) 38'; Eto'o (yellow card) 40'; Busquets (yellow card) 51'; Xavi (yellow card) 56'; Touré 62', (yellow card) 73'; Puyol (yellow card) 76'	(Report)	Pareja (yellow card) 17'; García (yellow card) 40'; De la Peña 50', 54'; Jarque (yellow card) 53'; Sánchez (yellow card) 61'; Alonso (yellow card) 88'; Tamudo (yellow card) 90+2'	Stadium: Camp Nou; Attendance: 76,942; Referee: Carlos Delgado Ferreiro

1 March 2009 25	Atlético Madrid	4–3	Barcelona	Madrid
19:00 CET	Forlán 32', 79' (pen.); Heitinga (yellow card) 46'; García (yellow card) 48'; Agüero 56', 88'; Assunção (yellow card) 66'	(Report)	Henry 18', 73'; Messi 30', (yellow card) 90+2'; Alves (yellow card) 57'	Stadium: Vicente Calderón; Attendance: 55,000; Referee: Bernardino González Vázquez

7 March 2009 26	Barcelona	2–0	Athletic Bilbao	Barcelona
20:00 CET	Busquets 16', (yellow card) 69'; Messi 31' (pen.); Eto'o (yellow card) 50'; Iniesta (yellow card) 58'	(Report)	Martínez (yellow card) 21'; Orbaiz (yellow card) 47'; Amorebieta (yellow card) 59'; Toquero (yellow card) 85'	Stadium: Camp Nou; Attendance: 75,074; Referee: Alberto Undiano Mallenco

15 March 2009 27	Almería	0–2	Barcelona	Almería
21:00 CET	Acasiete (yellow card) 21'; Ortiz (yellow card) 75'; Negredo (yellow card) 85'	(Report)	Bojan 52', 55'	Stadium: Estadio de los Juegos Mediterráneos; Attendance: 9,333; Referee: Manuel Mejuto González

22 March 2009 28	Barcelona	6–0	Málaga	Barcelona
19:00 CET	Xavi 18'; Messi 24'; Henry 32'; Alves (yellow card) 33', (goal) 50'; Eto'o 43', 56'; Guðjohnsen (yellow card) 80'	(Report)	Nacho (yellow card) 17'; Lolo (yellow card) 28'; Gámez (yellow card) 35'	Stadium: Camp Nou; Attendance: 75,178; Referee: César Muñiz Fernández

4 April 2009 29	Real Valladolid	0–1	Barcelona	Valladolid
20:00 CET	Aguirre (yellow card) 20'	(Report)	Eto'o 40'	Stadium: Estadio José Zorrilla; Attendance: 26,512; Referee: Miguel Ángel Pérez Lasa

11 April 2009 30	Barcelona	2–0	Recreativo Huelva	Barcelona
20:00 CEST	Iniesta 1'; Morris 67' (o.g.)	(Report)		Stadium: Camp Nou; Attendance: 56,831; Referee: Eduardo Iturralde González

18 April 2009 31	Getafe	0–1	Barcelona	Getafe
20:00 CEST	Contra (yellow card) 35'; Granero (yellow card) 65'; Mario (yellow card) 71'; Cortés (yellow card) 78'	(Report)	Messi 19'; Busquets (yellow card) 35'; Alves (yellow card) 87'	Stadium: Coliseum Alfonso Pérez; Attendance: 17,000; Referee: Javier Turienzo Alvárez

22 April 2009 32	Barcelona	4–0	Sevilla	Barcelona
22:00 CEST	Iniesta 2'; Eto'o 16'; Abidal (yellow card) 35'; Xavi 48'; Henry 54'; Alves (yellow card) 75'	(Report)	Navarro (yellow card) 41'; Mosquera (yellow card) 62'	Stadium: Camp Nou; Attendance: 98,722; Referee: Manuel Mejuto González

25 April 2009 33	Valencia	2–2	Barcelona	Valencia
22:00 CEST	Silva (yellow card) 22'; Maduro 43', (yellow card) 52'; Hernández 45+1'; Baraja (yellow card) 55'; Marchena (yellow card) 64'; Alexis (yellow card) 84'	(Report)	Messi 24'; Valdés (yellow card) 40'; Iniesta (yellow card) 42'; Henry 86'	Stadium: Mestalla; Attendance: 45,000; Referee: César Muñiz Fernández

2 May 2009 34	Real Madrid	2–6	Barcelona	Madrid
22:00 CEST	Higuaín 13'; Ramos (yellow card) 25', (goal) 55'; Marcelo (yellow card) 45'; Van der Vaart (yellow card) 73'	(Report)	Henry 17', 57'; Puyol 20', (yellow card) 38'; Abidal (yellow card) 22'; Messi 35', 74'; Piqué 82'	Stadium: Santiago Bernabéu; Attendance: 80,000; Referee: Alberto Undiano Mallenco

10 May 2009 35	Barcelona	3–3	Villarreal	Barcelona
19:00 CEST	Keita 11'; Eto'o 36'; Alves 45+1', (yellow card) 83'; Abidal (red card) 76'	(Report)	Llorente 22', 90+1'; Godín (yellow card) 49'; Rossi (yellow card) 57'; Fernández 77' (pen.), (yellow card) 89'	Stadium: Camp Nou; Attendance: 92,722; Referee: Fernando Teixeira Vitienes

17 May 2009 36	Mallorca	2–1	Barcelona	Palma
19:55 CEST	Arango 73'; Santana 77'; Ayoze (yellow card) 87'	(Report)	Eto'o 9'; Bojan (yellow card) 45'; Torres (yellow card) 75'	Stadium: Iberostar; Attendance: 20,000; Referee: Eduardo Iturralde González

23 May 2009 37	Barcelona	0–1	Osasuna	Barcelona
19:55 CEST	Abidal (yellow card) 33'; Guðjohnsen (yellow card) 38'; Bojan (yellow card) 72'; Muniesa (red card) 76'	(Report)	Pandiani 26'; Monreal (yellow card) 84'	Stadium: Camp Nou; Attendance: 77,331; Referee: Antonio Rubinos Pérez

30 May 2009 38	Deportivo La Coruña	1–1	Barcelona	A Coruña
22:00 CEST	Bodipo 31'; Sergio (yellow card) 54'	(Report)	Bojan (yellow card) 44'; Eto'o 89'	Stadium: Riazor; Attendance: 34,600; Referee: Fernando Teixeira Vitienes

=== Copa del Rey ===
==== Round of 32 ====
28 October 2008 First leg	Benidorm	0–1	Barcelona	Benidorm
21:00 CEST	Bardal (yellow card) 20'; Castell (yellow card) 41'; Moreno (yellow card) 73'; Morcillo (yellow card) 79'	(Report)	Cáceres (yellow card) 47'; Bojan 55'; Abidal (yellow card) 69'	Stadium: Estadio Municipal Guillermo Amor; Attendance: 6,000; Referee: José Luis Paradas Romero

12 November 2008 Second leg	Barcelona	1–0 (2–0 agg.)	Benidorm	Barcelona
21:00 CET	Messi 86'	(Report)	Moreno (yellow card) 20'	Stadium: Camp Nou; Attendance: 23,422; Referee: Carlos Clos Gómez

==== Round of 16 ====
6 January 2009 First leg	Atlético Madrid	1–3	Barcelona	Madrid
20:00 CET	Sinama Pongolle (yellow card) 21'; Simão (yellow card) 38'; Maniche (yellow card) 38'; Pernía (yellow card) 41'; Assunção (yellow card) 51'; Heitinga (red card) 56'; Ujfaluši 68', (yellow card) 86'; Banega (yellow card) 89'	(Report)	Messi 11', 57' (pen.), 79'; Cáceres (yellow card) 67'; Busquets (yellow card) 69'	Stadium: Vicente Calderón; Attendance: 54,851; Referee: Eduardo Iturralde González

14 January 2009 Second leg	Barcelona	2–1 (5–2 agg.)	Atlético Madrid	Barcelona
22:00 CET	Bojan 28'; Touré (yellow card) 63'; Guðjohnsen 76'	(Report)	Sinama Pongolle 23'; García (yellow card) 24'; Camacho (yellow card) 35'; Perea (yellow card) 78'	Stadium: Camp Nou; Attendance: 46,482; Referee: Manuel Mejuto González

==== Quarter-finals ====
21 January 2009 First leg	Espanyol	0–0	Barcelona	Barcelona
22:00 CET	García (yellow card) 17'; Hurtado (yellow card) 48'; Béranger (yellow card) 85'; Smiljanić (yellow card) 89'	(Report)	Cáceres (yellow card) 45'; Sánchez (yellow card) 65'	Stadium: Estadi Olímpic Lluís Companys; Attendance: 21,600; Referee: César Muñiz Fernández

29 January 2009 Second leg	Barcelona	3–2 (3–2 agg.)	Espanyol	Barcelona
21:30 CET	Busquets (yellow card) 32'; Bojan 34', 48'; Piqué 56'	(Report)	Chica (yellow card) 37'; Coro 58'; Callejón 64'; Jarque (yellow card) 69' (yellow-red card) 90+1'	Stadium: Camp Nou; Attendance: 78,443; Referee: Megía Dávila

==== Semi-finals ====
5 February 2009 First leg	Barcelona	2–0	Mallorca	Barcelona
21:30 CET	Touré (yellow card) 22'; Henry 34', (yellow card) 44'; Márquez 73'	(Report)	Webó (yellow card) 6'; Ayoze (yellow card) 26'; Josemi (yellow card) 72'; Suárez (yellow card) 75'; Nunes (yellow card) 83'; Trejo (yellow card) 89'	Stadium: Camp Nou; Attendance: 52,932; Referee: César Muñiz Fernández

4 March 2009 Second leg	Mallorca	1–1 (1–3 agg.)	Barcelona	Palma
21:00 CET	Castro 45'; Ramis (yellow card) 60'; Josemi (yellow card) 29' (yellow-red card) 65'; Corrales (yellow card) 70'; Keita (yellow card) 85'	(Report)	Touré (yellow card) 34'; Pinto (yellow card) 36'; Piqué (yellow card) 50'; Cáceres (red card) 50'; Messi 81'	Stadium: Iberostar; Attendance: 23,142; Referee: Antonio Rubinos Pérez

==== Final ====
13 May 2009 Final	Athletic Bilbao	1–4	Barcelona	Valencia
21:30 CEST	Toquero 8'; López (yellow card) 29'; Lertxundi (yellow card) 35'	Report	Touré (yellow card) 21' (goal) 31'; Keita (yellow card) 49'; Messi (yellow card) 50' (goal) 54'; Bojan 57'; Xavi 64'	Stadium: Mestalla; Attendance: 50,000; Referee: Medina Cantalejo

=== UEFA Champions League ===
==== Third qualifying round ====
13 August 2008 First leg	Barcelona (Spain)	4–0	(Poland) Wisła Kraków	Barcelona, Spain
21:45 CEST	Eto'o 17', 83'; Xavi 25'; Henry 50'	Report	Cantoro (yellow card) 15'	Stadium: Camp Nou; Attendance: 56,786; Referee: Claudio Circhetta (Switzerland)

26 August 2008 Second leg	Wisła Kraków (Poland)	1–0 (1–4 agg.)	(Spain) Barcelona	Kraków, Poland
20:45 CEST	Brożek (yellow card) 44'; Cléber 51'; Boguski (yellow card) 53'	Report	Henry (yellow card) 90+2'	Stadium: Stadion Miejski in Kraków; Attendance: 20,700; Referee: Ľuboš Micheľ (Slovakia)

==== Group stage ====
Pos	Team	Pld	W	D	L	GF	GA	GD	Pts	Qualification
1	(Spain) Barcelona	6	4	1	1	18	8	+10	13	Advance to knockout phase
2	(Portugal) Sporting CP	6	4	0	2	8	8	0	12	Advance to knockout phase
3	(Ukraine) Shakhtar Donetsk	6	3	0	3	11	7	+4	9	Transfer to UEFA Cup
4	(Switzerland) Basel	6	0	1	5	2	16	−14	1	

Source: RSSSF

16 September 2008 1	Barcelona (Spain)	3–1	(Portugal) Sporting CP	Barcelona, Spain
20:45 CEST	Márquez 21'; Eto'o 60' (pen.); Piqué (yellow card) 70'; Xavi 87'	Report	Tonel 72'; Rochemback (yellow card) 85'	Stadium: Camp Nou; Attendance: 58,354; Referee: Laurent Duhamel (France)

1 October 2008 2	Shakhtar Donetsk (Ukraine)	1–2	(Spain) Barcelona	Donetsk, Ukraine
20:45 CEST	Ilsinho 45'; Srna (yellow card) 47'; Fernandinho (yellow card) 58'; Chyhrynskyi (yellow card) 69'; Brandão (yellow card) 88'	Report	Xavi (yellow card) 41'; Keita (yellow card) 78'; Messi 87', 90+4'; Márquez (yellow card) 88'; Iniesta (yellow card) 90+3'	Stadium: RSK Olimpiyskyi; Attendance: 25,300; Referee: Howard Webb (England)

22 October 2008 3	Basel (Switzerland)	0–5	(Spain) Barcelona	Basel, Switzerland
20:45 CEST	Rubio (yellow card) 43'; Abraham (yellow card) 86'	Report	Messi 4'; Busquets 15'; Bojan 22', 46'; Xavi 48'	Stadium: St. Jakob-Park; Attendance: 37,500; Referee: Eric Braamhaar (Netherlands)

4 November 2008 4	Barcelona (Spain)	1–1	(Switzerland) Basel	Barcelona, Spain
20:45 CET	Messi 62'	Report	Derdiyok 82'; Costanzo (yellow card) 89'	Stadium: Camp Nou; Attendance: 49,479; Referee: Alexandru Tudor (Romania)

26 November 2008 5	Sporting CP (Portugal)	2–5	(Spain) Barcelona	Lisbon, Portugal
20:45 CET	Caneira (yellow card) 54'; Veloso 65'; Liédson 66'; Patrício (red card) 71'	Report	Henry 14'; Piqué 17'; Busquets (yellow card) 33'; Messi 49'; Márquez (yellow card) 63'; Caneira 67' (o.g.); Bojan 73' (pen.)	Stadium: Estádio José Alvalade; Attendance: 31,765; Referee: Matteo Trefoloni (Italy)

9 December 2008 6	Barcelona (Spain)	2–3	(Ukraine) Shakhtar Donetsk	Barcelona, Spain
20:45 CET	Bojan (yellow card) 50'; Sylvinho 59'; Busquets 83'	Report	Hladkyy 31', 58', (yellow card) 87'; Hübschman (yellow card) 65'; Fernandinho 76'; Brandão (yellow card) 86'; Luiz Adriano (yellow card) 87'; Kucher (yellow card) 89'; Pyatov (yellow card) 90+1'	Stadium: Camp Nou; Attendance: 22,763; Referee: Mike Riley (England)

==== Knockout phase ====
===== Round of 16 =====
24 February 2009 First leg	Lyon (France)	1–1	(Spain) Barcelona	Lyon, France
20:45 CET	Juninho 7'; Toulalan (yellow card) 24'; Grosso (yellow card) 32'; Cris (yellow card) 87'	Report	Alves (yellow card) 34'; Puyol (yellow card) 61'; Busquets (yellow card) 63'; Henry 67'	Stadium: Stade de Gerland; Attendance: 39,258; Referee: Wolfgang Stark (Germany)

10 March 2009 Second leg	Barcelona (Spain)	5–2 (6–3 agg.)	(France) Lyon	Barcelona, Spain
20:45 CET	Henry 25', 27', (yellow card) 45+1'; Messi 40'; Eto'o 43'; Keita 90+5'	Report	Cris (yellow card) 12'; Makoun 44', (yellow card) 70'; Juninho (yellow card) 35' (yellow-red card) 90+1', (goal) 48'; Delgado (yellow card) 49'; Grosso (yellow card) 64'; Toulalan (yellow card) 76'	Stadium: Camp Nou; Attendance: 86,368; Referee: Tom Henning Øvrebø (Norway)

===== Quarter-finals =====
8 April 2009 First leg	Barcelona (Spain)	4–0	(Germany) Bayern Munich	Barcelona, Spain
20:45 CET	Messi 9', 38', (yellow card) 17'; Eto'o 12'; Henry 43'; Márquez (yellow card) 90'	Report	Lell (yellow card) 48'; Demichelis (yellow card) 57'	Stadium: Camp Nou; Attendance: 93,219; Referee: Howard Webb (England)
Note: Barcelona manager Pep Guardiola was ejected in the 18th minute.

14 April 2009 Second leg	Bayern Munich (Germany)	1–1 (1–5 agg.)	(Spain) Barcelona	Munich, Germany
20:45 CET	Lúcio (yellow card) 36'; Demichelis (yellow card) 42'; Ribéry 47'; Borowski (yellow card) 82'; Lell (yellow card) 84'	Report	Alves (yellow card) 18'; Puyol (yellow card) 25'; Keita 73'	Stadium: Allianz Arena; Attendance: 66,000; Referee: Roberto Rosetti (Italy)

===== Semi-finals =====
28 April 2009 First leg	Barcelona (Spain)	0–0	(England) Chelsea	Barcelona, Spain
20:45 CET	Touré (yellow card) 37'; Puyol (yellow card) 74'	Report	Alex (yellow card) 26'; Ballack (yellow card) 29'	Stadium: Camp Nou; Attendance: 95,231; Referee: Wolfgang Stark (Germany)

6 May 2009 Second leg	Chelsea (England)	1–1 (1–1a agg.)	(Spain) Barcelona	London, England
20:45 CEST	Essien 9' (yellow card) 74'; Alex (yellow card) 77'; Ballack (yellow card) 90+6'; Drogba (yellow card) 90+9'	Report	Alves (yellow card) 30'; Abidal (red card) 66'; Eto'o (yellow card) 90+1'; Iniesta 90+3' (yellow card) 90+4'	Stadium: Stamford Bridge; Attendance: 37,857; Referee: Tom Henning Øvrebø (Norway)

===== Final =====
27 May 2009 Final	Barcelona (Spain)	2–0	(England) Manchester United	Rome, Italy
20:45 CEST	Eto'o 10'; Piqué (yellow card) 16'; Messi 70'	[Report]	Ronaldo (yellow card) 78'; Scholes (yellow card) 80'; Vidić (yellow card) 90+3'	Stadium: Stadio Olimpico; Attendance: 62,467; Referee: Massimo Busacca (Switzerland)

== Record ==
Competition	Won	Draw	Lost
La Liga	27	6	5
Copa del Rey	7	2	0
UEFA Champions League	8	5	2
Friendly	6	0	0
Total	48	13	7
