= 2011–12 RCD Mallorca season =

RCD Mallorca
2011–12 season
- Chairman: Jaume Cladera
- Manager: Michael Laudrup (1–5), Miguel Ángel Nadal (6), Joaquín Caparrós (7–38)
- Stadium: Iberostar
- La Liga: 8th
- Copa del Rey: Quarter-finals
Home colours	Away colours

The 2011–12 season will be the 78th season in Real Club Deportivo Mallorca's history and their 15th consecutive season in La Liga, the top division of Spanish football. It covers a period from 1 July 2011 to 30 June 2012.

Mallorca will compete for their first La Liga title after a 17th-place finish in the 2010–11 La Liga. They will also enter the Copa del Rey in the Round of 32.

== Players ==
=== Squad information ===
The numbers are established according to the official website:www.rcdmallorca.es

As of 19 February 2011

Note: Flags indicate national team as defined under FIFA eligibility rules; some limited exceptions apply. Players may hold more than one non-FIFA nationality.

No.	Pos.	Nation	Player
1	GK	ESP	Juan Calatayud
3	MF	BRA	João Victor
4	DF	ESP	Iván Ramis
5	MF	ESP	Tomás Pina
6	MF	ESP	Sergio Tejera
7	MF	FRA	Michael Pereira
8	FW	GEQ	Emilio Nsue
10	FW	ISR	Tomer Hemed
11	MF	URU	Chory Castro
13	GK	ISR	Dudu Aouate

No.	Pos.	Nation	Player
14	MF	JPN	Akihiro Ienaga
15	DF	URU	Pablo Cáceres
16	DF	POR	José Nunes (captain)
18	FW	ESP	Víctor Casadesús
19	MF	ESP	José Luis Martí (vice-captain)
21	DF	ESP	Martí Crespí
22	DF	ESP	Pau Cendrós
23	MF	ARG	Fernando Tissone
–	DF	ESP	Kevin

=== Transfers ===
==== In ====
No.	Pos.	Nat.	Name	Age	EU	Moving from	Type	Transfer window	Ends	Transfer fee	Source
	FW	(Argentina)	Óscar Trejo	23	Non-EU	Rayo Vallecano	Loan return	Summer		N/A	AS.com
	FW	(Israel)	Tomer Hemed	24	EU	Maccabi Haifa (Israel)	Transfer	Summer	2014	Free	Marca.com
	DM	(Spain)	Javi Castellano	23	EU	Real Unión	Loan return	Summer		N/A	Esfutbol.net
	AM	(Spain)	Tuni	29	EU	Gimnàstic	Loan return	Summer		N/A	
	GK	(Spain)	Juan Calatayud	31	EU	Hércules	Transfer	Summer	2013	Free	AS.com
	LB	(Uruguay)	Pablo Cáceres	26	Non-EU	Tigre (Argentina)	Transfer	Summer	2012	Free	AS.com

Total expenditure: ▼€0 million

==== Out ====
No.	Pos.	Nat.	Name	Age	EU	Moving to	Type	Transfer window	Transfer fee	Source
5	CB	(Spain)	Rubén	29	EU	Osasuna	Transfer	Summer	Free	Marca.com
	FW	(Argentina)	Óscar Trejo	23	Non-EU	Sporting Gijón	Transfer	Summer	Free	AS.com
	GK	(Spain)	Tomeu Nadal	21	EU	Getafe	Transfer	Summer	Free	AS.com
17	LB	(Spain)	Ayoze Díaz	29	EU	Deportivo La Coruña	Transfer	Summer	Free	Esfutbol.net
	DM	(Spain)	Javi Castellano	23	EU	Las Palmas	Transfer	Summer	Free	Esfutbol.net
26	FW	(Spain)	Sergi Enrich	21	EU	Recreativo	Loan	Summer	N/A	Esfutbol.net

Total income: ▲€0 million

== Club ==
=== Coaching staff ===
Position	Staff
Head coach	Miquel Àngel Nadal
Physical trainer	Pep Alomar Serra
Goalkeepers coach	Miki Garro
Doctor	Tomeu Munar
Masseuse	César Mota
Nurse	Javier Cotrino
Physiotherapist	Vicenç Marí Mayans
Chiropodist	Pep Claverol
Team delegate	Damián Amer
Kit managers	Luís Martín, José León

Source: RCDMallorca.es

== Competitions ==
=== La Liga ===
==== League table ====
Pos	Team	Pld	W	D	L	GF	GA	GD	Pts	Qualification or relegation
6	Levante	38	16	7	15	54	50	+4	55	Qualification for the Europa League play-off round (Note: Athletic Bilbao qualified for the third qualifying round of the 2012–13 UEFA Europa League as runners-up of the 2011–12 Copa del Rey to Barcelona, who have qualified for the 2012–13 UEFA Champions League. Consequently, Levante entered the play-off round.)
7	Osasuna	38	13	15	10	44	61	−17	54	
8	Mallorca	38	14	10	14	42	46	−4	52	
9	Sevilla	38	13	11	14	48	47	+1	50	
10	Athletic Bilbao	38	12	13	13	49	52	−3	49	Qualification for the Europa League third qualifying round

Source: ESPN
Rules for classification: 1st points; 2nd head-to-head points; 3rd head-to-head goal difference; 4th head-to-head goals scored; 5th goal difference; 6th number of goals scored; 7th Fair-play points

==== Results summary ====
Overall								Home						Away					
Pld	W	D	L	GF	GA	GD	Pts	W	D	L	GF	GA	GD	W	D	L	GF	GA	GD
17	4	7	6	15	22	−7	19	3	3	3	9	9	0	1	4	3	6	13	−7

Last updated: 12 January 2012.
Source: Competitive matches

==== Results by round ====
Round	1	2	3	4	5	6	7	8	9	10	11	12	13	14	15	16	17	18	19	20	21	22	23	24	25	26	27	28	29	30	31	32	33	34	35	36	37	38
Ground	H	A	H	A	H	A	H	A	H	A	H	A	H	H	A	H	A	H	A	A	H	A	H	A	H	A	H	A	H	A	H	A	A	H	A	H	H	A
Result	W	L	L	L	W	D	D	D	L	L	D	D	W	D	W	L	D	L	W	L	W	L	W	L	D	D	W	W	L	L	D	W	L	W	W	W	W	L
Position	6	10	14	15	11	10	12	12	13	14	15	15	12	14	11	14	14	16	14	15	13	16	13	15	14	15	13	12	13	13	14	12	13	12	10	7	6	8

Source: La Liga
A = Away; H = Home; W = Win; D = Draw; L = Loss

==== Matches ====
28 August 2011 1	Mallorca	1–0	Espanyol	Palma, Balearic Islands
18:00 CET	Ramis (yellow card) 33'; Hemed (yellow card) 43'; De Guzmán 62'	Summary	Moreno (yellow card) 32'; Márquez (yellow card) 42'; López (yellow card) 86'	Stadium: Iberostar Stadium; Attendance: 10,000; Referee: Pedro Jesús Pérez Montero

11 September 2011 2	Real Betis	1–0	Mallorca	Seville, Andalusia
12:00 CET	Amaya (yellow card) 11'; Sevilla (yellow card) 55'; Castro 86'	Summary	Cáceres (yellow card) 31'; João Victor (yellow card) 45+1'; Pina (yellow card) 79'; Chico (yellow card) 82'	Stadium: Estadio Benito Villamarín; Attendance: 35,125; Referee: Carlos del Cerro Grande

17 September 2011 3	Mallorca	0–1	Málaga	Palma, Balearic Islands
18:00 CET	Cáceres (yellow card) 44'; Chico (yellow card) 56'	Summary	Cáceres 39' (o.g.); Toulalan (yellow card) 68'	Stadium: Iberostar Stadium; Attendance: 12,000; Referee: Miguel Pérez Lasa

20 September 2011 4	Villarreal	2–0	Mallorca	Villarreal, Valencia
22:00 CET	Rossi 8'; Nilmar 52'	Summary	Pina (yellow card) 43'; Tissone (yellow card) 44'; Chico (yellow card) 90'	Stadium: Estadio El Madrigal; Attendance: 18,000; Referee: José Luis González González

25 September 2011 5	Mallorca	2–1	Real Sociedad	Palma, Balearic Islands
12:00 CET	Cáceres (yellow card) 4'; Víctor 20'; Castro 50'; Pina (yellow card) 59'	Summary	Agirretxe 15'	Stadium: Iberostar Stadium; Attendance: 13,000; Referee: Miguel Ángel Ayza Gámez

1 October 2011 6	Osasuna	2–2	Mallorca	Pamplona, Navarre
18:00 CET	Flaño (yellow card) 33'; García 45+1', 59'; Lamah (yellow card) 80'	Summary	Ramis (yellow card) 4'; Pina (yellow card) 4'; Hemed 34' (pen.), 80' (pen.), (yellow card) 70'; Nsue (red card) 72'; Aouate (yellow card) 90+3'	Stadium: El Sadar Stadium; Attendance: 10,500; Referee: Carlos Velasco Carballo

15 October 2011 7	Mallorca	1–1	Valencia	Palma, Balearic Islands
18:00 CET	Martí (yellow card) 39'; Chico (yellow card) 43'; Bigas (yellow card) 68'; Hemed 90+3' (pen.)	[uk.soccerway.com/matches/2011/10/15/spain/primera-division/real-club-deportivo-mallorca/valencia-club-de-futbol/1140709/ Summary]	Rami 38'; Bruno (yellow card) 57'; Albelda (yellow card) 75'; Topal (yellow card) 90+2'; Feghouli (yellow card) 90+3'	Stadium: Iberostar Stadium; Attendance: 15,000; Referee: José Luis Paradas Romero

23 October 2011 8	Atlético Madrid	1–1	Mallorca	Madrid, Madrid
18:00 CET	Falcao 43' (pen.); Turan (yellow card) 56'; Suárez (yellow card) 61'	Report	Hemed 2' (pen.); Ramis (yellow card) 42'; Chico (yellow card) 47'; Bigas (yellow card) 55'; Tissone (yellow card) 68'; Castro (yellow card) 84'; Ienaga (yellow card) 84'	Stadium: Vicente Calderón Stadium; Attendance: 35,000; Referee: David Fernández Borbalán

26 October 2011 9	Mallorca	1–2	Sporting Gijón	Palma, Balearic Islands
22:00 CET	Castro 16'; Ramis (yellow card) 45'; Tejera (yellow card) 69'; Cendrós (yellow card) 72'; Pina (yellow card) 76'	Report	Bilić 49'; De las Cuevas (yellow card) 54'; João Victor 65' (o.g.); Hernández (yellow card) 88'; Eguren (yellow card) 89'; Castro (yellow card) 90'	Stadium: Iberostar Stadium; Attendance: 8,000; Referee: Carlos del Cerro Grande

29 October 2011 10	Barcelona	5–0	Mallorca	Barcelona, Catalonia
20:00 CET	Messi 13' (pen.), 21', 30'; Cuenca 50'; Alves (yellow card) 74', (goal) 90+1'	Report	Nsue (yellow card) 12'; Bigas (yellow card) 90'	Stadium: Nou Camp; Attendance: 80,153; Referee: Pedro Jesús Pérez Montero

5 November 2011 11	Mallorca	0–0	Sevilla	Palma, Balearic Islands
18:00 CET	Bigas (yellow card) 28'; Castro (yellow card) 30'; Tejera (yellow card) 79'; Pina (yellow card) 90+2'; Ramis (yellow card) 90+4'	Report	Medel (yellow card) 29'; Spahić (yellow card) 58'	Stadium: Iberostar Stadium; Attendance: 13,000; Referee: José Antonio Teixeira Vitienes

7 December 2011 12	Granada	2–2	Mallorca	Granada, Andalusia
19:30 CET	Benítez (yellow card) 18'; Jara (yellow card) 40'; Siqueira 54'; Martins 59', (yellow card) 62'; Cortés (yellow card) 88'	Report	Víctor 23'; Nsue (yellow card) 48'; Hemed 67' (pen.); Nunes (yellow card) 75'	Stadium: Estadio Nuevo Los Cármenes; Attendance: 16,212; Referee: Carlos Clos Gómez

27 November 2011 13	Mallorca	2–1	Racing Santander	Palma, Balearic Islands
18:00 CET	Víctor (yellow card) 41', (goal) 58'; Torrejón 45+1' (o.g.); Martí (yellow card) 51'; Pina (yellow card) 56'; Bigas (red card) 85'	Report	Stuani (yellow card) 45'; Toño (yellow card) 56'; Nahuelpan 75'	Stadium: Iberostar Stadium; Attendance: 13,000; Referee: David Fernández Borbalán

4 December 2011 14	Mallorca	1–1	Athletic Bilbao	Palma, Balearic Islands
20:00 CET	Álvaro 3'; Pina (yellow card) 30'; Tissone (yellow card) 45+2'; Ramis (yellow card) 56'; Martí (yellow card) 68'; Cáceres (yellow card) 71'; Chico (yellow card) 79'; Hemed (yellow card) 83'	Report	Amorebieta (yellow card) 41', (goal) 45+3'; Iturraspe (yellow card) 51'; Pérez (yellow card) 72'; Toquero (yellow card) 86'; Raúl (yellow card) 90+2'	Stadium: Iberostar Stadium; Attendance: 13,000; Referee: César Muñiz Fernández

11 December 2011 15	Real Zaragoza	0–1	Mallorca	Zaragoza, Aragon
18:00 CET	Postiga (yellow card) 5'; Pintér (yellow card) 85'	Report	Cendrós (yellow card) 18'; Víctor 39'	Stadium: La Romareda; Attendance: 15,000; Referee: Fernando Teixeira Vitienes

17 December 2011 16	Mallorca	1–2	Getafe	Palma, Balearic Islands
18:00 CET	Ramis 10'; Pina (yellow card) 19'; Cáceres (yellow card) 21'; Chico (yellow card) 55'; Pereira (yellow card) 58'; Cendrós (yellow card) 79'	Report	Barrada 28', 44'; Lopo (yellow card) 31'; Masilela (yellow card) 81'; Moyà (yellow card) 83'; Torres (yellow card) 87'	Stadium: Iberostar Stadium; Attendance: 11,000; Referee: Eduardo Iturralde González

7 January 2012 17	Levante	0–0	Mallorca	Valencia, Valencia
18:00 CET	López (yellow card) 24'; Farinós (yellow card) 68'	Report	Pina (yellow card) 57'; Cendrós (yellow card) 62'; Pereira (yellow card) 90+3'	Stadium: Estadi Ciutat de València; Attendance: 10,560; Referee: Alberto Undiano Mallenco

14 January 2012 18	Mallorca	1–2	Real Madrid	Palma, Balearic Islands
20:00 CET	Hemed 39'; Tissone (yellow card) 56'; Cendrós (yellow card) 57'; Castro (yellow card) 83'; Ogunjimi (yellow card) 88'	Report	Higuaín 72'; Coentrão (yellow card) 80'; Callejón 85'	Stadium: Iberostar Stadium; Attendance: 20,000; Referee: Pedro Jesús Pérez Montero

22 January 2012 19	Rayo Vallecano	0–1	Mallorca	Madrid, Madrid
16:00 CET	Trashorras (yellow card) 72'	Report	Martí (yellow card) 31'; Tissone (yellow card) 36'; Ramis 57'; Chico (yellow card) 77'; Aouate (yellow card) 89'; Pereira (yellow card) 89'	Stadium: Campo de Fútbol de Vallecas; Attendance: 9,033; Referee: Eduardo Iturralde González

28 January 2012 20	Espanyol	1–0	Mallorca	Barcelona, Catalonia
18:00 CET	Weiss 18'; Forlín (yellow card) 52'; Moreno (yellow card) 58'; Gómez (yellow card) 63'; Baena (yellow card) 76'; Bifouma (yellow card) 80'	Report	Cendrós (yellow card) 45'; Aouate (red card) 46'; Chico (yellow card) 88'	Stadium: Estadi Cornellà-El Prat; Attendance: 26,000; Referee: Ignacio Iglesias

4 February 2012 21	Mallorca	1–0	Real Betis	Palma, Balearic Islands
18:00 CET	Castro 24'; Ramis (yellow card) 59' (yellow-red card) 86'; Martí (yellow card) 65'; Cáceres (yellow card) 81'; Víctor (yellow card) 90+1' (yellow-red card) 90+3'	Report	Mario (yellow card) 23' (yellow-red card) 75'; Iriney (yellow card) 51'	Stadium: Iberostar Stadium; Attendance: 9,000; Referee: Carlos Velasco Carballo

12 February 2012 22	Málaga	3–1	Mallorca	Málaga, Andalusia
16:00 CET	Fernández 11'; Recio (yellow card) 38'; Toulalan 55'; Rondón 69'; Weligton (yellow card) 87'	Report	Pereira 4'; Chico (yellow card) 75'; Alfaro (yellow card) 82'	Stadium: Estadio La Rosaleda; Attendance: 20,000; Referee: Miguel Ángel Ayza Gámez

19 February 2012 23	Mallorca	4–0	Villarreal	Palma, Balearic Islands
18:00 CET	Tissone (yellow card) 31'; Nunes (yellow card) 33', (goal) 68'; Crespí (yellow card) 36'; Víctor 41', 65'; Martí 52'; Pina (yellow card) 87'	Report	Senna (yellow card) 15'	Stadium: Iberostar Stadium; Attendance: 14,500; Referee: Alfonso Álvarez Izquierdo

26 February 2012 24	Real Sociedad	1–0	Mallorca	San Sebastián, Basque Country
18:00 CET	Bergara (yellow card) 59'; Agirretxe 79'; Llorente (yellow card) 90+2'	Report	Tissone (yellow card) 53'; Martí (yellow card) 60'; Pereira (yellow card) 60'; Ramis (yellow card) 90'	Stadium: Anoeta Stadium; Attendance: 25,000; Referee: José Luis Paradas Romero

3 March 2012 25	Mallorca	1–1	Osasuna	Palma, Balearic Islands
18:00 CET	Tissone (yellow card) 34'; Nsue 73'; Chico (yellow card) 80'	Report	Damià (yellow card) 6'; Cejudo 45+1', (yellow card) 65'; Timor (yellow card) 90+4'	Stadium: Iberostar Stadium; Attendance: 18,000; Referee: Carlos Clos Gómez

11 March 2012 26	Valencia	2–2	Mallorca	Valencia, Valencia
16:00 CET	T. Costa 23', (red card) 85'; Aduriz 42'; Rami (yellow card) 90+2'	Report	Cáceres (yellow card) 14'; Nsue 57'; Víctor 66', (yellow card) 87'; Aouate (yellow card) 86'	Stadium: Mestalla; Attendance: 39,000; Referee: César Muñiz Fernández

18 March 2012 27	Mallorca	2–1	Atlético Madrid	Palma, Balearic Islands
16:00 CET	Godín 47' (o.g.); Pereira 49', (yellow card) 53'; Castro (yellow card) 52'; Ramis (red card) 53'; Aouate (yellow card) 69'; Martí (yellow card) 89'	Report	Falcao 66'; Gabi (yellow card) 81'	Stadium: Iberostar Stadium; Attendance: 16,000; Referee: Javier Turienzo Álvarez

21 March 2012 28	Sporting Gijón	2–3	Mallorca	Gijón, Asturias
20:00 CET	Colunga 38'; Botía 66'; Cases (yellow card) 79'; Canella (yellow card) 90+1'	Report	Nunes 30'; Tissone (yellow card) 45+1'; Orfila 46' (o.g.); Cáceres (yellow card) 64'; Cendrós (yellow card) 73'; Álvaro 77'; Bigas (yellow card) 90+4'	Stadium: El Molinón; Attendance: 18,000; Referee: Pedro Jesús Pérez Montero

24 March 2012 29	Mallorca	0–2	Barcelona	Palma, Balearic Islands
18:00 CET	Pereira (yellow card) 27'; Ramis (yellow card) 39'	Report	Messi 25'; Thiago (yellow card) 37' (yellow-red card) 57'; Piqué 79'; Puyol (yellow card) 88'	Stadium: Iberostar Stadium; Attendance: 22,284; Referee: Miguel Ángel Ayza Gámez

2 April 2012 30	Sevilla	3–1	Mallorca	Seville, Andalusia
21:00 CET	Trochowski (yellow card) 26'; Coke (yellow card) 44'; Negredo 51'; Reyes (yellow card) 56'; Manu 62'; Navas 68'; Medel (yellow card) 88'	Report	Martí (yellow card) 20'; Álvaro (yellow card) 34'; Hemed 74'	Stadium: Estadio Ramón Sánchez Pizjuán; Attendance: 35,000; Referee: Miguel Pérez Lasa

8 April 2012 31	Mallorca	0–0	Granada	Palma, Balearic Islands
16:00 CET	Chico (yellow card) 10'; Tejera (yellow card) 63'; Pereira (yellow card) 68'; Cendrós (yellow card) 71'	Report	Hurtado (yellow card) 32'	Stadium: Iberostar Stadium; Attendance: 13,000; Referee: Carlos Delgado Ferreiro

12 April 2012 32	Racing Santander	0–3	Mallorca	Santander, Cantabria
21:00 CET	Osmar (yellow card) 12'; Gullón (yellow card) 24'; Luque (yellow card) 55'	Report	Nsue 1'; Castro (yellow card) 37', (goal) 47'; Alfaro 54'	Stadium: El Sardinero; Attendance: 10,000; Referee: David Fernández Borbalán

15 April 2012 33	Athletic Bilbao	1–0	Mallorca	Bilbao, Basque Country
18:00 CET	Llorente 13'; Herrera (yellow card) 50'	Report	Cáceres (yellow card) 53'; Cendrós (yellow card) 76'; Pina (yellow card) 86'; Tejera (yellow card) 88'	Stadium: San Mamés Stadium; Attendance: 25,000; Referee: Javier Estrada Fernández

21 April 2012 34	Mallorca	1–0	Real Zaragoza	Palma, Balearic Islands
18:00 CET	Víctor 33'	Report		Stadium: Iberostar Stadium; Attendance: 13,000; Referee: Alfonso Álvarez

28 April 2012 35	Getafe	1–3	Mallorca	Getafe, Madrid
18:00 CET	Alexis 90+2'	Report	Víctor 30'; Alfaro 68'; Hemed 78'	Stadium: Coliseum Alfonso Pérez; Attendance: 5,000; Referee: José Paradas

2 May 2012 36	Mallorca	1–0	Rayo Vallecano	Palma, Balearic Islands
20:00 CET	Castro 62'	Report		Stadium: Iberostar Stadium; Attendance: 13,000; Referee: Miguel Ayza

5 May 2012 37	Mallorca	1–0	Levante	Palma, Balearic Islands
21:00 CET	Pina 54'	Report		Stadium: Iberostar Stadium; Attendance: 19,000; Referee: Ignacio Iglesias

13 May 2012 38	Real Madrid	4–1	Mallorca	Madrid, Madrid
20:00 CET	Ronaldo 19'; Benzema 23'; Özil 49', 58'	Report	Castro 52'	Stadium: Santiago Bernabéu Stadium; Attendance: 79,500; Referee: José González

== See also ==
- 2011–12 Copa del Rey
- 2011–12 La Liga
