= José Luis Rondo =

Equatoguinean footballer (born 1976)

Personal information
- Full name: José Luis Rondo Polo
- Date of birth: 19 March 1976 (age 50)
- Place of birth: Palma, Spain
- Height: 1.73 m (5 ft 8 in)
- Position: Right-back

Youth career
- 1986–1987: Relojería Calvo
- 1987–1995: Mallorca

Senior career*
Years	Team	Apps	(Gls)
1995–1999	Mallorca B	126	(4)
1999–2001	Getafe	53	(0)
2001–2003	Elche	46	(0)
2004–2005	Castellón	34	(0)
2006	Algeciras	18	(0)
2006–2007	Vecindario	20	(0)
2007–2008	Constancia		
2008–2010	Andratx		
Total		297	(4)

International career
2003–2009	Equatorial Guinea	13	(0)
- * Club domestic league appearances and goals

José Luis Rondo Polo (born 19 March 1976) is a former professional footballer. Born in Spain, he played for the Equatorial Guinea national team. He started his career as a forward, subsequently moving to right winger and finally right-back.

He spent his entire career in his native Spain, representing five clubs at the professional level.

During six years, Rondo was an Equatorial Guinea international.

== Club career ==
Rondo was born in Palma, Balearic Islands. An unsuccessful RCD Mallorca youth graduate – he could only appear for their reserves – he would manage to spend seven seasons in the second division, with Getafe CF, Elche CF and UD Vecindario; his first experience at that level was precisely with Mallorca B, in 1998–99 (31 matches played, team relegation).

After a one-year spell with CD Constancia (division four, also in Mallorca), Rondo signed with neighbours CE Andratx of the same tier.

== International career ==
Spanish-born, Rondo would however represent the land of one of his parents, Equatorial Guinea, in the molds of several players whom played in Spain: Javier Balboa, Rodolfo Bodipo, Benjamín Zarandona, etc.
