= Lucas Aveldaño =

Argentine footballer (born 1985)

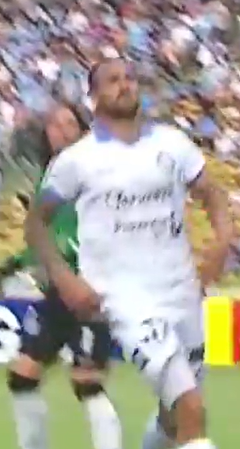
- Aveldaño with Belgrano in 2014

Personal information
- Full name: Lucas Elio Aveldaño
- Date of birth: 19 July 1985 (age 41)
- Place of birth: Rafaela, Argentina
- Height: 1.85 m (6 ft 1 in)
- Position: Centre-back

Youth career
- Atlético Rafaela

Senior career*
Years	Team	Apps	(Gls)
2005–2008	Atlético Rafaela	90	(7)
2008–2012	Racing Club	102	(6)
2012–2017	Belgrano	109	(3)
2015	→ Nueva Chicago (loan)	12	(2)
2015–2016	→ Mallorca (loan)	41	(2)
2017–2018	Tenerife	35	(1)
2019	Universidad de Chile	17	(1)
2020–2021	Deportes Iquique	30	(2)
2021–2022	Tudelano	30	(1)
2023–2024	Andratx	38	(3)
- * Club domestic league appearances and goals

Lucas Elio Aveldaño (born 19 July 1985) is an Argentine former footballer who played as a centre-back.

== Career ==
Aveldaño began his playing career in 2005 with Atlético de Rafaela in the Argentine 2nd division. In 2008, he joined Racing Club de Avellaneda of the Primera División. On 31 October 2009 Aveldaño scored his first goal for Racing in a 4–0 home win against Atlético Tucumán.

His last club was CE Andratx. Aveldaño announced his retirement on 11 August 2024.
