= Pau Cendrós =

Spanish footballer (born 1987)

Personal information
- Full name: Pau Cendrós López
- Date of birth: 1 April 1987 (age 39)
- Place of birth: Palma, Spain
- Height: 1.80 m (5 ft 11 in)
- Position: Defender

Youth career
- La Victoria
- San Francisco
- Mallorca

Senior career*
Years	Team	Apps	(Gls)
2004–2007	Mallorca B		
2007–2012	Mallorca	56	(0)
2007–2008	→ Benidorm (loan)	37	(1)
2008–2009	→ Tenerife (loan)	8	(0)
2009–2010	→ Levante (loan)	35	(1)
2012–2014	Gent	26	(0)
2014	Alcorcón	13	(1)
2014–2015	Mallorca	35	(2)
2015–2016	Lugo	24	(0)
2016–2017	Mirandés	3	(0)
2018	Peña Deportiva	14	(0)
2018–2019	Unionistas	10	(0)
2020	Andratx	2	(0)
2020–2021	Poblense	17	(0)
2021	Sant Julià	0	(0)
2021–2022	Campos	35	(2)
2022–2025	Collerense	74	(0)
Total		389+	(7+)
- * Club domestic league appearances and goals

Pau Cendrós López (born 1 April 1987) is a Spanish former professional footballer who played as either a right-back or a central defender.

== Club career ==
=== Mallorca ===
Born in Palma de Mallorca, Cendrós rose through the youth ranks of Balearic Islands giants RCD Mallorca. His first professional spell was on loan, with lowly Benidorm CF.

Cendrós was loaned again in the 2008–09 season, now to Canary Islands-based club CD Tenerife, appearing rarely as it returned to La Liga after a seven-year absence. In the following year more of the same, also in the Segunda División, as he represented Levante UD.

On 29 August 2010, after being one of Levante's most important defensive players as the Valencia team returned to the top flight after two years, Cendrós finally made his debut for Mallorca's main squad at the age of 23, playing the entire 0–0 home draw against Real Madrid in the season's opener. He appeared in 31 games in his first year, starting in 29.

In the 2011–12 campaign, challenged by newly signed Chico and Gianni Zuiverloon, Cendrós still managed to be the most utilised player in his position, taking part in 25 league matches as Mallorca, coached by Joaquín Caparrós, finished in eighth position.

=== Gent and Alcorcón ===
Cendrós moved abroad for the first time on 7 August 2012, joining Belgian Pro League side KAA Gent on a two-year contract. In January 2014, he returned to his country, signing with AD Alcorcón of the second tier.

=== Mallorca return and Lugo ===
In summer 2014, Cendrós re-joined his first professional club Mallorca, agreeing to a two-year deal. He totalled nearly 3,000 minutes in the first season of his second spell, but was later deemed surplus to requirements by new manager Albert Ferrer.

Cendrós joined CD Lugo also in division two on 17 August 2015.

=== Mirandés ===
On 19 July 2016, Cendrós signed for fellow second-division team CD Mirandés as a free agent. On 25 January 2017, after only three competitive appearances, he left by mutual consent.

=== Later career ===
Cendrós competed in the Spanish lower leagues until his retirement, representing in quick succession SCR Peña Deportiva, Unionistas de Salamanca CF, CE Andratx and UD Poblense. He also had a spell in the Andorran Primera Divisió with UE Sant Julià.
