= Niko Kata =

Equatoguinean footballer (born 1993)

Personal information
- Full name: Senga Nicolás Kata Martínez
- Date of birth: 15 January 1993 (age 33)
- Place of birth: Barcelona, Spain
- Height: 1.87 m (6 ft 2 in)
- Positions: Midfielder; forward

Team information
- Current team: Andratx
- Number: 20

Youth career
- 2007–2011: Unificación Bellvitge
- 2011–2012: L'Hospitalet

Senior career*
Years	Team	Apps	(Gls)
2012–2013	Dinàmic Batlló	33	(27)
2013–2014	Viladecans	29	(5)
2014–2015	Santboià	33	(13)
2015–2017	Gavà	62	(13)
2017–2018	Atlético Saguntino	32	(3)
2018–2019	Extremadura	0	(0)
2018–2019	→ SS Reyes (loan)	17	(0)
2019	Valencia Mestalla	6	(0)
2019–2020	Real Unión	10	(0)
2020	Delfín	0	(0)
2020	Montañesa	5	(0)
2021	Real Estelí	6	(0)
2021–2022	Futuro Kings		
2022–2023	Portugalete	11	(0)
2023	Cerdanyola	16	(1)
2023	Inter Club d'Escaldes	0	(0)
2023	Atlético Paso	12	(1)
2024	Cerdanyola	16	(1)
2024–2025	Formentera	22	(2)
2025	Som Maresme	0	(0)
2025	Motril	9	(1)
2025–	Andratx	13	(0)

International career^{‡}
2016–	Equatorial Guinea	14	(0)
- * Club domestic league appearances and goals as of 15 May 2026 ‡ National team caps and goals as of 23 March 2022

Senga Nicolás Kata Martínez (born 15 January 1993), known as Niko Kata, is a footballer who plays as a midfielder for Segunda Federación club Andratx. Born in Spain, he plays for the Equatorial Guinea national team.

== Club career ==
Born in Barcelona, Catalonia, to a DR Congolese father and an Equatoguinean mother, Kata finished his formation with CE L'Hospitalet. After failing to make a competitive appearance for the side, he made his senior debut with Dinàmic Batlló Esportiu in the regional leagues, scoring 27 goals in only 33 appearances.

In 2013 Kata joined UD Viladecans, and featured regularly before moving to FC Santboià. After contributing with 13 goals but missing out promotion in the play-offs, he signed for Tercera División club CF Gavà on 19 June 2015.

On 10 July 2017, Kata signed for Atlético Saguntino in Segunda División B.

In early 2020, Kata was signed by Ecuadorian club Delfín SC, managed then by Spaniard Ángel López, who had been his head coach in the Equatorial Guinea national team. In mid 2020, he returned to Spain and signed for CF Montañesa in Tercera División. On 14 January 2021, he was signed by Nicaraguan club Real Estelí FC.

On 8 September 2024, Kata signed for SD Formentera in Tercera Federación.

On 29 December 2025, Kata joined CE Andratx in Segunda Federación.

== International career ==
Eligible for Spain, Congo DR and Equatorial Guinea, Kata opted to represent the latter. He made his debut for them on 11 October 2016 starting in a friendly against Lebanon.
