= James Davis (footballer, born 1995) =

Equatoguinean footballer (born 1995)

Personal information
- Full name: James Anthony Davis Borikó
- Date of birth: 5 July 1995 (age 31)
- Place of birth: Palma, Spain
- Height: 1.72 m (5 ft 8 in)
- Position: Winger

Team information
- Current team: Llosetense
- Number: 14

Youth career
- 2008–2009: Son Cotoner
- 2009–2010: Santa Catalina
- 2010–2011: Atlético Baleares
- 2011–2014: Mallorca

Senior career*
Years	Team	Apps	(Gls)
2014–2018	Mallorca B	87	(13)
2015–2019	Mallorca	22	(0)
2018–2019	→ Guijuelo (loan)	6	(0)
2019	Iraklis	12	(1)
2019–2020	Atlético Saguntino	10	(1)
2020–2021	Platges Calvià	7	(0)
2021	Andratx	13	(2)
2021–	Llosetense	57	(13)

International career
2015–2019	Equatorial Guinea	5	(0)
- * Club domestic league appearances and goals as of 26 February 2023

James Anthony Davis Borikó (born 5 July 1995) is a professional footballer who plays for Tercera Federación club Llosetense. Born in Spain, he played five games for the Equatorial Guinea national team. Mainly a winger, he can also appear as a left back.

== Club career ==
Born in Palma, Majorca, Balearic Islands, James joined RCD Mallorca's youth setup in 2011, aged 16, from CD Atlético Baleares. He was also called up to train with the main squad two times, one in October 2012 under Joaquín Caparrós, and other in February 2013 under Gregorio Manzano.

In the 2014 summer James was promoted to the reserves in Segunda División B. He made his senior debut on 24 August, coming on as a second-half substitute in a 2–1 home win against Valencia CF Mestalla.

James made his professional debut on 21 November 2015, coming on as a half-time substitute for Thierry Moutinho in a 1–1 home draw against CD Lugo in the Segunda División. On 24 June of the following year, he signed a new two-year deal with the club, but remained assigned to the B-side.

On 22 August 2018, James was loaned to third division side CD Guijuelo, for one year.

== International career ==
A son of a Fernandino father and a Bubi mother, James was eligible for Equatorial Guinea despite being born in Spain. On 26 March 2015 he made his full international debut, starting in a 0–2 friendly loss against Egypt.

== Career statistics ==
=== International ===
Equatorial Guinea
Year	Apps	Goals
2015	2	0
2016	1	0
2019	2	0
Total	5	0
