= Eugenio Isnaldo =

Argentine footballer

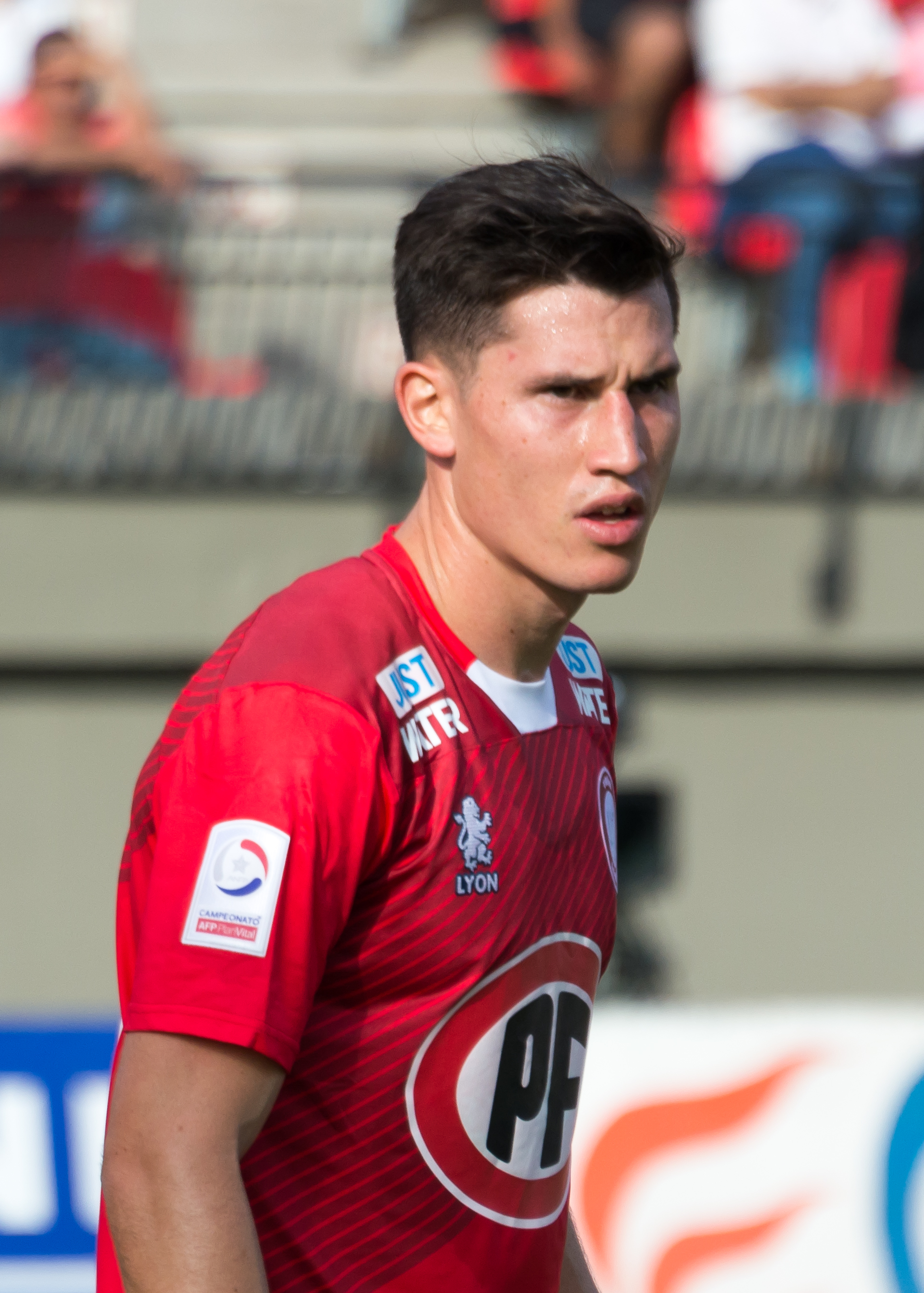
- Isnaldo with Unión La Calera in 2019

Personal information
- Full name: Eugenio Horacio Isnaldo
- Date of birth: 7 January 1994 (age 32)
- Place of birth: Rosario, Argentina
- Height: 1.80 m (5 ft 11 in)
- Position: Left winger

Team information
- Current team: Andratx
- Number: 14

Youth career
- Newell's Old Boys

Senior career*
Years	Team	Apps	(Gls)
2013–2017	Newell's Old Boys	34	(0)
2015–2016	→ Defensa y Justicia (loan)	32	(4)
2017–2018	Asteras Tripolis	18	(0)
2018–2021	Defensa y Justicia	15	(1)
2019	→ Unión La Calera (loan)	15	(4)
2021–2022	Bahia	6	(0)
2022–2023	Atlético Tucumán	16	(0)
2023–2024	Strongest	22	(1)
2024	Iraklis	14	(3)
2024–2025	Orihuela	20	(4)
2025–2026	Curicó Unido	4	(0)
2026–	Andratx	9	(3)
- * Club domestic league appearances and goals as of 15 May 2026

Eugenio Horacio Isnaldo (born 7 January 1994) is an Argentine professional footballer who plays as a left winger for Spanish Segunda Federación club Andratx.

== Career ==
On 19 July 2017, Asteras Tripolis officially announced the acquisition of the Argentinian winger on a three years' contract for an undisclosed fee.

On 8 September 2025, Isnaldo joined Chilean club Curicó Unido in the Liga de Ascenso.
