= CE Andratx =

Spanish association football club

Andratx
- Full name: Club Esportiu Andratx
- Nicknames: Andritxols; Blaus; Galls
- Founded: 1 July 1957; 68 years ago
- Ground: Sa Plana
- Capacity: 600
- President: Rafael Ribot Muñoz
- Head coach: José Contreras
- League: Tercera Federación – Group 11
- 2025–26: Segunda Federación – Group 3, 15th of 18 (relegated)
- Website: https://www.ceandratx.es/en/
Home colours	Away colours

Club Esportiu Andratx is a Spanish football team based in Andratx, Mallorca, Balearic Islands. Founded in 1957, its first team plays in the Tercera Federación – Group 11, the fourth tier of Spanish football. Moreover, its youth academy consists of a dozen of teams. The club's home ground is the Camp Municipal de Sa Plana, the only football stadium in the town of Andratx since 1924.

The highest competition in which Andratx has competed is the Segunda Federación. Moreover, the club has played 15 seasons in the Tercera División and one in the Tercera Federación. Andratx has been crowned champion on five occasions, the last one in the 2022-23 Tercera Federación.

== History ==
=== Name evolution ===
- Unión Deportiva Andraitx (1957-1967)
- Club Deportivo Andraitx (1967-1980)
- Club Deportivo Andratx (1980-1996)
- Club Esportiu Andratx (1996-present)

=== Beginnings of football in Andratx ===
After the birth of the first Mallorca football clubs in Palma during the first years of the 20th century, the first team from Andratx was created in 1923: Juventud Andritxola FC, a club that would change its name to CD Andraitx the same year after continuing independently of the recreative club Juventud Andritxola. CD Andraitx was responsible for the construction of the Camp Municipal de Sa Plana in 1924. The club was dissolved in 1930.

Other football clubs created in Andratx before the creation of the current club were Centre Recreatiu Cultural d'Andratx (1932), CD Huracán (around 1940-41), CF Morralla (around 1940-41), and Sociedad Deportiva Andratx (1941). No team from Andratx ever reached the first division of the regional Campionat de Mallorca de futbol.

=== Birth of CE Andratx ===
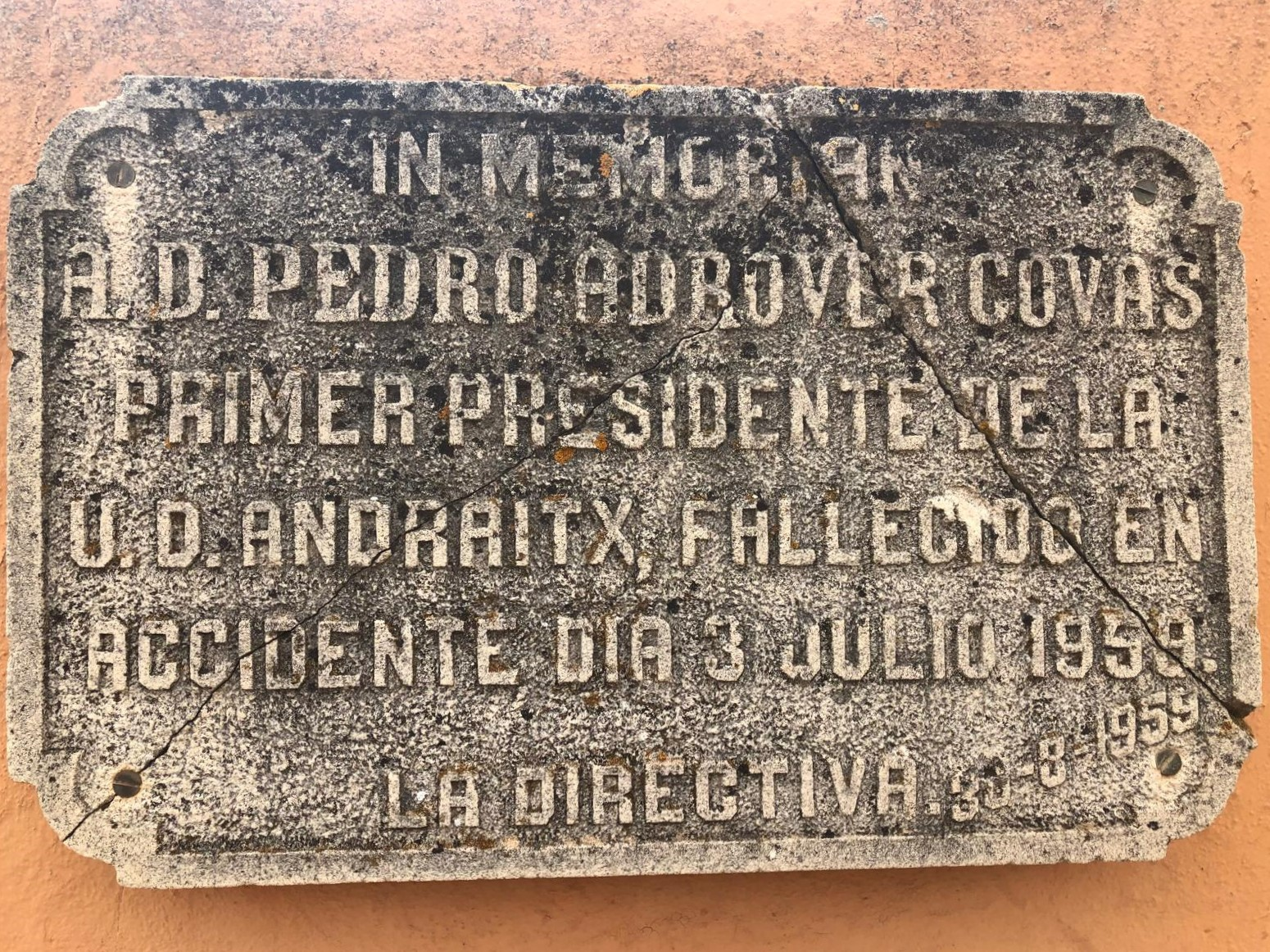
Commemorative plaque of the first president of CE Andratx at the Camp Municipal de Sa Plana

In the winter of 1957, three new clubs were created in Andratx: Club Deportivo Andraitx, Club de Futbol S'Arracó (from S'Arracó), and Club Morralla (from the Port d'Andratx). These clubs decided to merge, to create a sole club in the town, a club that would be stronger and more representative of Andratx. This club was created on the 1st of July 1957 under the name Unión Deportiva Andraitx.

=== Rest of the 20th century. Four promotions to the Tercera ===
During most of the 20th century, Andratx played in regional amateur divisions, but the club also played some seasons in the Tercera División, a total of 10 seasons in different decades without ever participating in the playoffs for promotion. Moreover, the club participated in some editions of the Copa Uruguay, an important local competition at the time.

=== 2000s and 2010s. A classic Mallorca football team ===
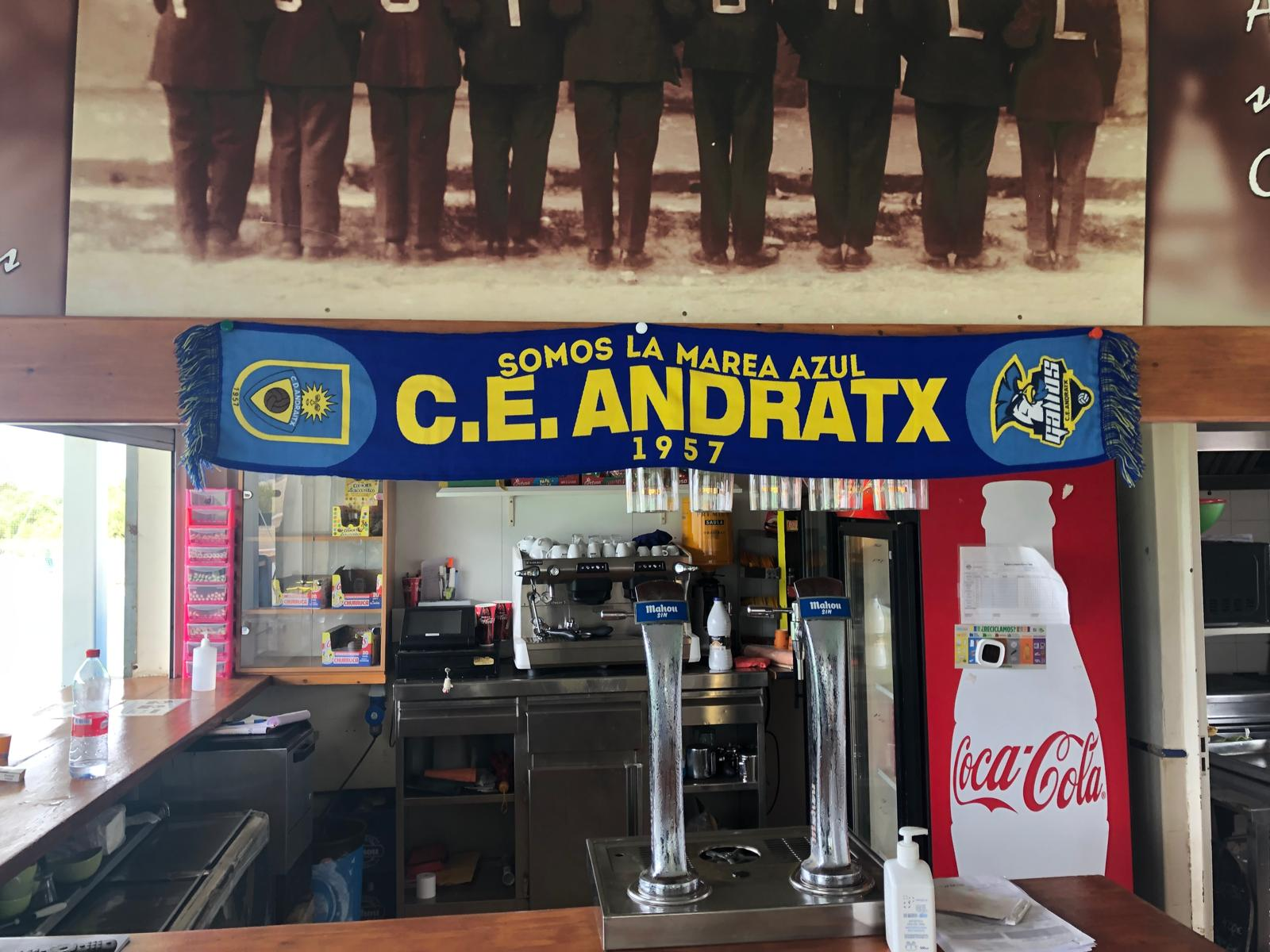
Bar of the Camp Municipal de Sa Plana

Already in the 21st century, Andratx continued competing mainly in the Regional Preferent, except for a handful of seasons in the Tercera División. The club's dynamic changed with the promotion to the Tercera in 2019, because Andratx would obtain its best classification so far one year later: 6th.

=== 2020s. The glorious era ===
The 2020-21 season, defined by the COVID-19 pandemic, ended in an ever higher classification. The team finished in second place, which resulted in direct promotion to the new Segunda Federación, a competition that would be inaugurated with the presence of Andratx.

In 2021-22, Andratx played against teams from the Iberian Peninsula in the regular league for the first time in its history, after only having played local competitions. During most of the season, the club occupied positions in the middle of the classification, but it finally finished 14th and got relegated to the Tercera División.

During the 2022-23 season, Andratx made its debut in the Tercera Federación (formally a new competition, but it is considered a continuation of the Tercera División). The club aimed to return to the fourth category and achieved its goal by being crowned champion of the Tercera for the first time in its history. The 2023-24 season started similarly to the one two years before, as Andratx seemed to avoid relegation for most of the season, but this season ended differently, as the club finished in 12th place and stayed up.

==== Historic results in the Copa del Rey ====
Andratx passed the first round of the Copa del Rey on two occasions, feats that caused nationwide repercussion. In the 2021-22 season, the Balearic club eliminated the Asturian club Real Oviedo (2-1 in Andratx), a club that was active in the Segunda División. However, Andratx was defeated in the second round by the Andalusian club Sevilla FC, active in the Primera División, after penalties (1-1, 5-6 after penalties, in Andratx).

Two seasons later, concretely in 2023-24, Andratx qualified again for the second round, this time by beating the Aragonese club SD Tarazona (3-2, after extra time, in Andratx). However, the club lost in the second round to the Basque club Real Sociedad (0-1 in Andratx), another game considered one of the most memorable moments in the club's history.

== Season to season ==
Season	Tier	Division	Place	Copa del Rey
1957–58	5	2ª Reg.	1st	
1958–59	4	1ª Reg.	6th	
1959–60	4	1ª Reg.	2nd	
1960–61	3	3ª	9th	
1961–62	3	3ª	10th	
1962–63	4	1ª Reg.	3rd	
1963–64	5	2ª Reg.	2nd	
1964–65	5	2ª Reg.		
1965–66	4	1ª Reg.	3rd	
1966–67	4	1ª Reg.	6th	
1967–68	4	1ª Reg.	3rd	
1968–69	4	1ª Reg.	10th	
1969–70	4	1ª Reg.	13th	
1970–71	4	1ª Reg.	5th	
1971–72	4	1ª Reg.	10th	
1972–73	5	1ª Reg.	8th	
1973–74	5	1ª Reg.	4th	
1974–75	5	1ª Reg.	4th	
1975–76	5	1ª Reg.	1st	
1976–77	4	Reg. Pref.	12th	

Season	Tier	Division	Place	Copa del Rey
1977–78	5	Reg. Pref.	7th	
1978–79	5	Reg. Pref.	9th	
1979–80	4	3ª	10th	
1980–81	4	3ª	8th	
1981–82	4	3ª	16th	
1982–83	4	3ª	20th	
1983–84	5	Reg. Pref.	2nd	
1984–85	5	Reg. Pref.	7th	
1985–86	5	Reg. Pref.	7th	
1986–87	5	Reg. Pref.	4th	
1987–88	4	3ª	19th	
1988–89	5	Reg. Pref.	19th	
1989–90	6	1ª Reg.	3rd	
1990–91	5	Reg. Pref.	10th	
1991–92	5	Reg. Pref.	8th	
1992–93	5	Reg. Pref.	10th	
1993–94	5	Reg. Pref.	16th	
1994–95	5	Reg. Pref.	2nd	
1995–96	5	Reg. Pref.	3rd	
1996–97	4	3ª	16th	

Season	Tier	Division	Place	Copa del Rey
1997–98	4	3ª	15th	
1998–99	4	3ª	19th	
1999–2000	5	Reg. Pref.	12th	
2000–01	5	Reg. Pref.	13th	
2001–02	5	Reg. Pref.	4th	
2002–03	5	Reg. Pref.	3rd	
2003–04	5	Reg. Pref.	2nd	
2004–05	5	Reg. Pref.	8th	
2005–06	5	Reg. Pref.	3rd	
2006–07	4	3ª	19th	
2007–08	5	Reg. Pref.	4th	
2008–09	4	3ª	20th	
2009–10	5	Reg. Pref.	4th	
2010–11	5	Reg. Pref.	3rd	
2011–12	5	Reg. Pref.	2nd	
2012–13	4	3ª	17th	
2013–14	5	Reg. Pref.	1st	
2014–15	5	Reg. Pref.	6th	
2015–16	5	Reg. Pref.	5th	
2016–17	5	Reg. Pref.	16th	

Season	Tier	Division	Place	Copa del Rey
2017–18	5	Reg. Pref.	4th	
2018–19	5	Reg. Pref.	1st	
2019–20	4	3ª	6th	Preliminary
2020–21	4	3ª	2nd	
2021–22	4	2ª RFEF	14th	Second round
2022–23	5	3ª Fed.	1st	
2023–24	4	2ª Fed.	12th	Second round
2024–25	4	2ª Fed.	9th	
2025–26	4	2ª Fed.	15th	
2026–27	5	3ª Fed.		

- 4 seasons in Segunda Federación/Segunda División RFEF
- 15 seasons in Tercera División
- 2 seasons in Tercera Federación

== Stadium ==
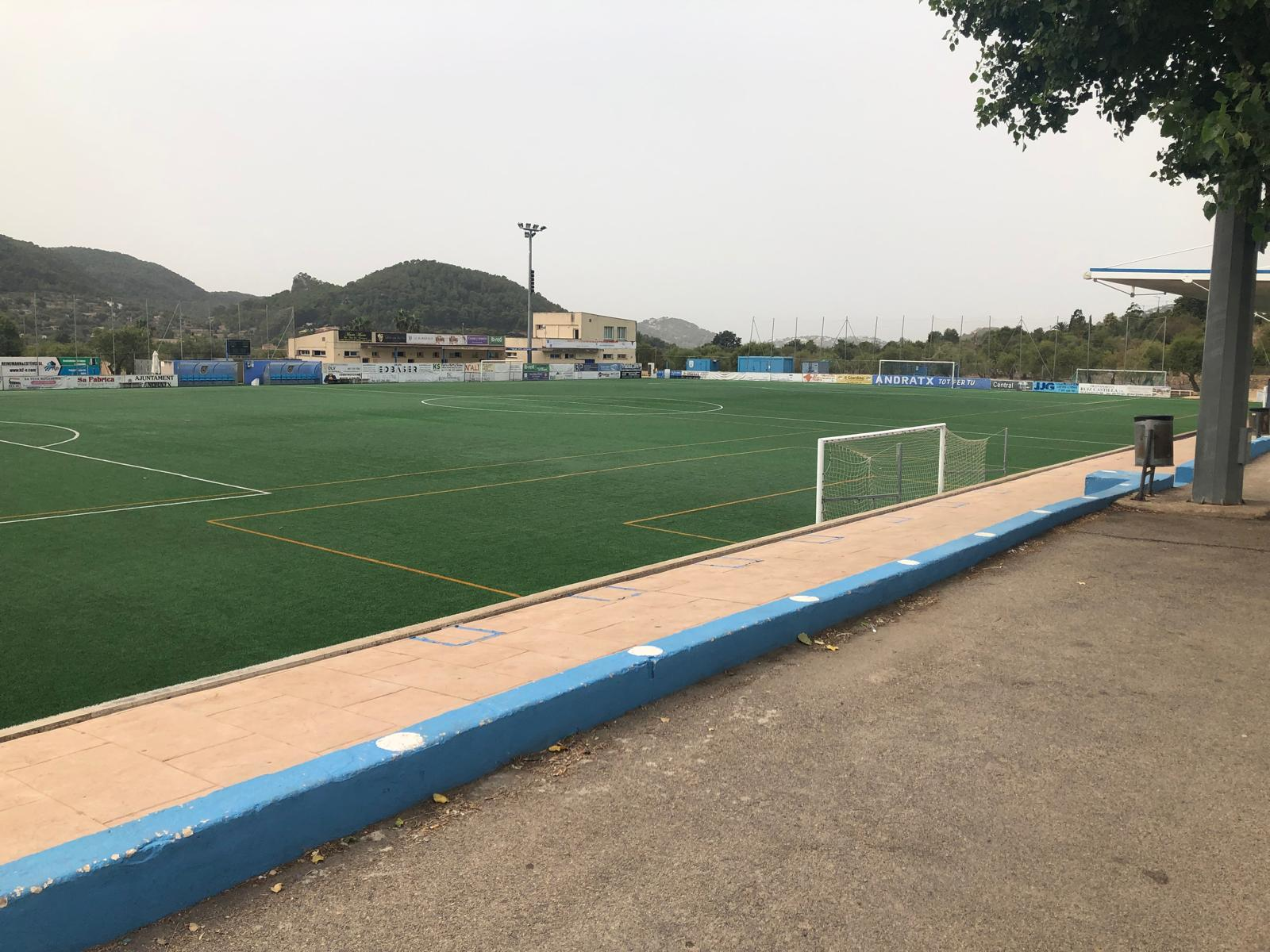
Camp Municipal de Sa Plana

Andratx plays its home matches at the Camp Municipal de Sa Plana, the only football stadium in Andratx since 1924. It has a capacity for 600 spectators and artificial grass, and its dimensions are 100x63.

== Current squad ==
As of 10 February 2026

Note: Flags indicate national team as defined under FIFA eligibility rules; some limited exceptions apply. Players may hold more than one non-FIFA nationality.

No.	Pos.	Nation	Player
1	GK	ESP	Lluís Francisco Salas
2	MF	ESP	Adrià Nicoli
3	FW	ESP	Cristian Tello
4	DF	ESP	Luis Navarro
5	DF	ESP	Kevin García
6	MF	ESP	Marc Muñoz
7	MF	ESP	Pablo Gálvez
8	MF	ESP	Xavi Bauzà
9	FW	ESP	Nacho Sánchez
10	MF	ESP	Miquel Llabrés
11	DF	ESP	Javier Sánchez
12	FW	ESP	Quim Montenegro

No.	Pos.	Nation	Player
13	GK	ESP	Elias Ramírez
14	FW	ARG	Eugenio Isnaldo
16	DF	ESP	Gabri Rabanillo
17	MF	ESP	Victor Lázaro
18	DF	ESP	Javier Hermelo
19	MF	ESP	Javi Fernández
20	MF	EQG	Niko Kata
21	FW	EQG	Adrián Garrido
22	DF	ESP	Carlos Sánchez
23	FW	ESP	Sergi Martín
24	MF	SUI	Mladjan Ivankovic
-	FW	ESP	Gabi García

== Former players ==
- (Spain) Rubén Nova
- (Argentina) Lucas Aveldaño
- (Spain) Kevin García
- (Equatorial Guinea) José Luis Rondo
- (Equatorial Guinea) James Davis
- (Spain) Marc Jiménez
- (Chile) Nicolás Ovalle Raffo
- (Spain) Carlos Sánchez

== Bibliography ==
- Jofre Mir, Gabriel (2008). Cincuenta años en la historia del C.D. Andraitx [Fifty years in the history of C.E. Andratx] (in Spanish). Andratx: Ajuntament d'Andratx and Imprenta Ihomar. PM 1937/2008.
