= Sergio Ortega (footballer, born 1980) =

Spanish footballer

Personal information
- Full name: Sergio Ortega González
- Date of birth: 25 November 1980 (age 45)
- Place of birth: Torrelavega, Spain
- Height: 1.82 m (6 ft 0 in)
- Position: Centre back

Youth career
- Gimnástica

Senior career*
Years	Team	Apps	(Gls)
1998–2000	Onda		
2001–2002	Gimnástica	26	(2)
2002–2006	Racing Santander B	86	(9)
2004–2005	→ Gimnástica (loan)	34	(0)
2006–2009	Numancia	56	(2)
2009–2012	Celta	20	(0)
2012–2013	Bezana	?	(1)
Total		222	(14)
- * Club domestic league appearances and goals

Sergio Ortega González (born 25 November 1980 in Torrelavega, Cantabria) is a Spanish retired footballer who played as a central defender.
