= Chico Flores =

Spanish footballer (born 1987)

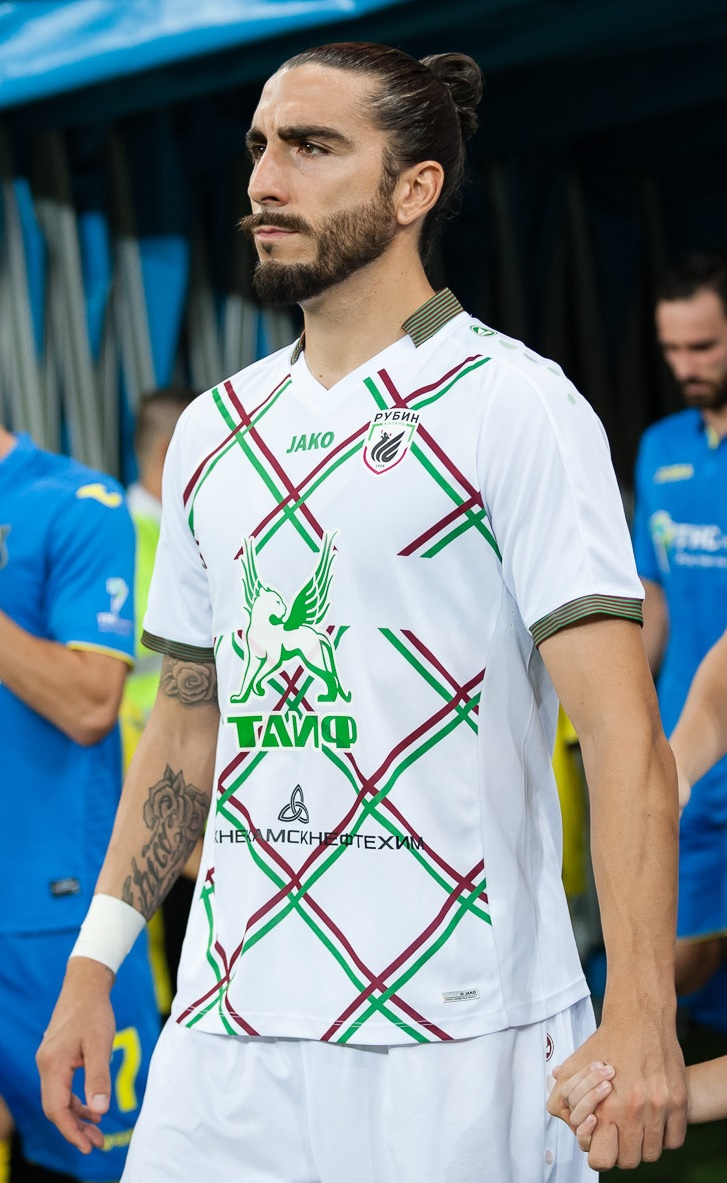
- Flores with Rubin Kazan in 2018

Personal information
- Full name: José Manuel Flores Moreno
- Date of birth: 6 March 1987 (age 39)
- Place of birth: Cádiz, Spain
- Height: 1.87 m (6 ft 2 in)
- Position: Centre-back

Youth career
- 1995–2001: GE Avante
- 2001–2004: CD Olímpico
- 2004–2005: Cádiz

Senior career*
Years	Team	Apps	(Gls)
2005–2007	Cádiz B		
2007–2008	Cádiz	3	(0)
2007	→ Portuense (loan)	19	(3)
2008	→ Barcelona B (loan)	13	(2)
2008–2010	Almería	47	(1)
2010–2012	Genoa	15	(0)
2011–2012	→ Mallorca (loan)	33	(0)
2012–2014	Swansea City	57	(2)
2014–2017	Lekhwiya	60	(6)
2017–2018	Granada	29	(0)
2018–2019	Rubin Kazan	8	(0)
2019–2020	Fuenlabrada	18	(0)
Total		302	(14)

International career
2008–2009	Spain U21	3	(0)
- * Club domestic league appearances and goals

José Manuel Flores Moreno (born 6 March 1987), commonly known as Chico Flores, is a Spanish former professional footballer who played as a central defender.

== Club career ==
=== Early years and Almería ===
Born in Cádiz, Andalusia, Chico started playing professionally with hometown club Cádiz CF, first with its reserves. In the 2006–07 season, with the main squad in the Segunda División, he appeared in three league games.

Chico served two loans in 2007–08, first at Racing Club Portuense then with FC Barcelona Atlètic, helping the Catalans to win promotion to Segunda División B after arriving at the request of manager Pep Guardiola. At the end of the campaign, he signed with Cádiz neighbours UD Almería in La Liga.

In 2009–10, Chico contributed 27 appearances as the team again retained their top-flight status as 13th. He also spent more than one month on the sidelines due to leg ailments.

=== Genoa ===
Chico signed with Genoa CFC in late July 2010 after extensive negotiations, for five years and €4 million. He took part in less than half of the Serie A matches in his only season.

On 22 July 2011, RCD Mallorca reached an agreement with the Italians to take Chico on a season-long loan, with the Balearic Islands club having an option to buy the player at the end of the campaign. He totalled 2,884 minutes of action as either a right or centre-back, starting in all his appearances for an eighth-place finish.

=== Swansea City ===
On 10 July 2012, Chico signed for Premier League side Swansea City for £2 million on a three-year contract, rejoining former Mallorca boss Michael Laudrup in the process. He made his league debut on 18 August, playing the full 90 minutes in a 5–0 away win against Queens Park Rangers at Loftus Road.

Chico was given a straight red card after 71 minutes of the 2–2 home draw with Sunderland on 1 September 2012, for a challenge on Louis Saha – referee Roger East decided it was too high and sent him off for dangerous play. An injury prevented him from playing in his team's victory in the League Cup and, on 6 April 2013, he agreed to an extension meant to keep him at the Liberty Stadium until June 2016.

In January 2014, police were called to Swansea's training ground after Chico allegedly picked up a brick in a furious row with team-mate Garry Monk. On 1 February, he was accused of diving in a game against West Ham United, where he went down under contact from Andy Carroll, who was subsequently sent off by Howard Webb.

=== Lekhwiya ===
On 9 August 2014, Lekhwiya SC announced the signing of Chico, who had arrived in Doha two days earlier for the pertinent medical. He reunited with former Swansea manager Michael Laudrup, and scored in his Qatar Stars League debut for his new club, a 5–0 victory over Qatar SC in the first match of the season.

=== Later career ===
In September 2017, free agent Chico returned to Spain and signed for Granada CF ahead of the second-division campaign. On 28 June 2018 he moved abroad again, joining FC Rubin Kazan of the Russian Premier League on a two-year contract but leaving in February 2019 by mutual consent.

On 16 July 2019, Chico agreed to a one-year deal with CF Fuenlabrada, newly promoted to the second tier. After retiring at age 33, he returned to Almería as youth team manager.

== International career ==
On 14 October 2008, Chico made his debut for the Spain under-21 team, playing the entire 3–1 extra time win over Switzerland for the 2009 UEFA European Championship qualifiers. He was called for the squad that appeared in the finals in Sweden, participating in the 0–0 group stage draw against Germany.

== Career statistics ==
As of match played on 1 March 2019

Appearances and goals by club, season and competition
Club	Season	League			Cup		Other		Total	
Club	Season	Division	Apps	Goals	Apps	Goals	Apps	Goals	Apps	Goals
Cádiz	2006–07	Segunda División	3	0	0	0	—		3	0
Portuense (loan)	2007–08	Segunda División B	19	3	2	0	—		21	3
Almería	2008–09	La Liga	20	1	3	0	—		23	1
Almería	2009–10	La Liga	27	0	1	0	—		28	1
Almería	Total		47	1	4	0	—		51	4
Genoa	2010–11	Serie A	15	0	1	0	—		16	0
Mallorca	2011–12	La Liga	33	0	1	0	—		34	0
Swansea City	2012–13	Premier League	26	0	6	1	—		32	1
Swansea City	2013–14	Premier League	31	3	2	0	10 (Note: Appearances in UEFA Europa League)	0	43	3
Swansea City	Total		57	3	8	1	10	0	75	4
Lekhwiya	2014–15	Qatar Stars League	25	4	0	0	10 (Note: Appearances in AFC Champions League)	1	35	5
Lekhwiya	2015–16	Qatar Stars League	17	1	0	0	7	1	24	2
Lekhwiya	2016–17	Qatar Stars League	18	1	0	0	6	1	24	2
Total			60	6	0	0	23	3	83	9
Granada	2017–18	Segunda División	29	0	0	0	—		29	0
Rubin Kazan	2018–19	Russian Premier League	8	0	0	0	—		8	0
Career total			271	13	16	1	33	3	320	17

== Honours ==
Swansea City

- Football League Cup: 2012–13

Lekhwiya

- Qatar Stars League: 2014–15, 2016–17
- Qatari Super Cup: 2015, 2016
- Qatar Crown Prince Cup: 2015
- Qatar Emir Cup: 2016
