= Pablo Cáceres =

Uruguayan footballer (born 1985)

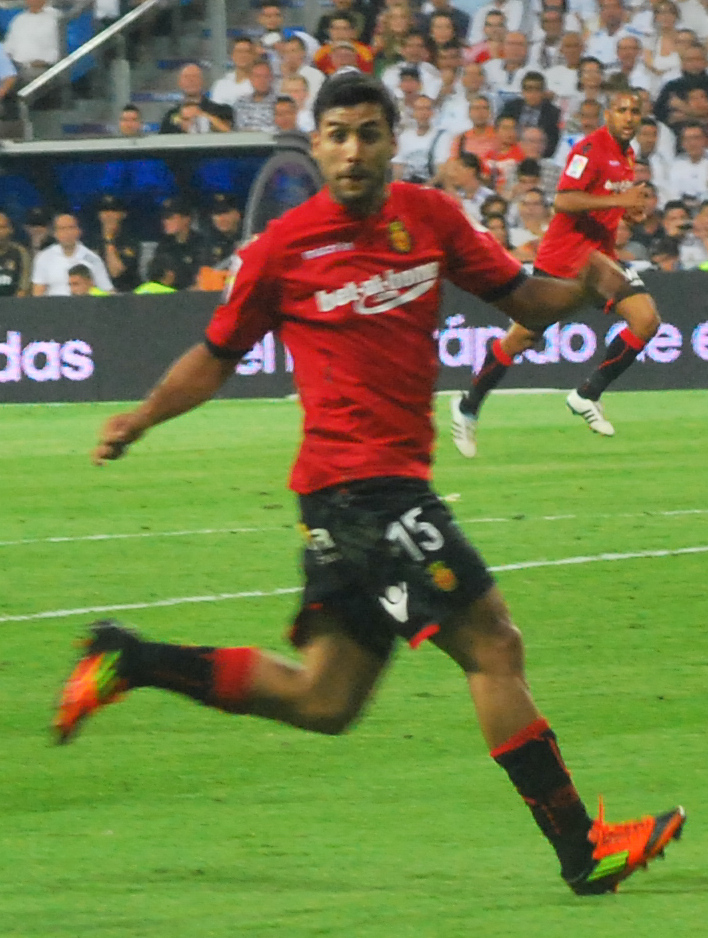
- Cáceres with Mallorca in 2012

Personal information
- Full name: Pablo Cáceres Rodríguez
- Date of birth: 22 April 1985 (age 41)
- Place of birth: Montevideo, Uruguay
- Height: 1.72 m (5 ft 8 in)
- Position: Left back

Senior career*
| Years | Team | Apps | (Gls) |
| 2005 | Danubio | 5 | (0) |
| 2006 | Twente | 0 | (0) |
| 2006–2009 | MSV Duisburg | 34 | (2) |
| 2009 | Omonia | 6 | (0) |
| 2010 | Danubio | 10 | (0) |
| 2010–2011 | Tigre | 18 | (0) |
| 2011–2013 | Mallorca | 28 | (0) |
| 2012–2013 | → Torino (loan) | 2 | (0) |
| 2013–2014 | Rangers de Talca | 10 | (0) |
| 2014–2016 | Tigre | 15 | (0) |
| 2015–2016 | → Atlético Tucumán (loan) | 30 | (0) |
| 2016–2017 | Atlético Tucumán | 16 | (0) |
| 2017 | Puebla | 6 | (0) |
- * Club domestic league appearances and goals as of 3 February 2017 (UTC)

Pablo Cáceres Rodríguez (born 22 April 1985) is a Uruguayan former professional footballer who played as a defender.

== Club career ==
Pablo Cáceres made 18 Bundesliga and five 2. Bundesliga appearances for MSV Duisburg until he joined Cypriot club Omonia.

In 2011, he signed for Mallorca who play in La Liga.
