= Kevin García (footballer, born 1989) =

Spanish footballer

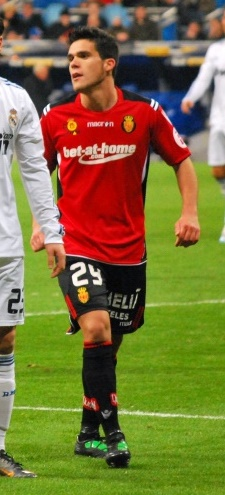
- García in action for Mallorca in 2011

Personal information
- Full name: Kevin Martín García Martínez
- Date of birth: 8 September 1989 (age 37)
- Place of birth: Palma, Spain
- Height: 1.77 m (5 ft 9 1/2 in)
- Position: Left-back

Team information
- Current team: Andratx

Youth career
- Mallorca

Senior career*
Years	Team	Apps	(Gls)
2008–2010	Mallorca B	45	(0)
2010–2014	Mallorca	56	(2)
2014–2016	Panetolikos	50	(2)
2017	Hospitalet	6	(0)
2017–2018	Guijuelo	31	(0)
2018–2019	Burgos	22	(0)
2019	Murcia	6	(0)
2020	Panetolikos	15	(0)
2020–2021	Xanthi	17	(2)
2022–	Andratx	102	(2)
- * Club domestic league appearances and goals as of 16:13, 11 April 2026 (UTC)

Kevin Martín García Martínez (born 8 September 1989) is a Spanish professional footballer who plays as a left-back for Segunda Federación club Andratx.

== Club career ==
=== Mallorca ===
García was born in Palma de Mallorca, Balearic Islands. A product of local club RCD Mallorca's youth system, he spent his first two years as a senior with the reserves, the last in the Segunda División B.

On 18 September 2010, García made his official debut for the first team, playing 90 minutes in a 2–0 La Liga home win against CA Osasuna. During his first professional season he was the most used left-back by manager Michael Laudrup, overtaking veterans Ayoze and Enrique Corrales.

García scored his only goal in the Spanish top flight on 6 January 2013, in the 1–1 home draw with Atlético Madrid.

=== Panetolikos ===
On 16 July 2014, García moved abroad and joined Panetolikos F.C. of the Super League Greece. He netted twice in 26 matches in his debut campaign, helping to a seventh-place finish.

=== Back to Spain ===
García returned to his homeland in February 2017, after agreeing to a contract with third-tier side CE L'Hospitalet. He continued to compete in that league the following years, representing CD Guijuelo, Burgos CF and Real Murcia CF.
