= Memorial Artemio Franchi =

Football Tournament

The Memorial Artemio Franchi was a summer association football friendly tournament that took place twice, in the Stadio Artemio Franchi, Florence, Italy, in 2008 and 2009. The tournament began as a proposal by the Italian club ACF Fiorentina. The main reason for conducting the tournament he based on the significant contribution of Artemio Franchi in the soccer world, being at the time vice president of FIFA, and UEFA president.

== Titles ==
Year	Champions	Result	Runners-up	Stadium
2008	(Spain) Barcelona	3–1	(Italy) Fiorentina	Stadio Artemio Franchi, Florence, Italy
2009	(France) Paris Saint-Germain	3–0	(Italy) Fiorentina	Stadio Artemio Franchi, Florence, Italy
