= Enrique Corrales =

Spanish footballer

Personal information
- Full name: Enrique Corrales Martín
- Date of birth: 1 March 1982 (age 44)
- Place of birth: Seville, Spain
- Height: 1.75 m (5 ft 9 in)
- Position: Left-back

Youth career
- Real Madrid

Senior career*
Years	Team	Apps	(Gls)
2000–2004	Real Madrid B	112	(4)
2004–2008	Osasuna	85	(0)
2008–2011	Mallorca	32	(0)
2011	Granada	0	(0)
2011–2013	Las Palmas	32	(0)
2013–2014	Huesca	14	(0)
2015–2016	Sport Boys	4	(0)
Total		279	(4)

International career
1998–1999	Spain U16	10	(0)
1999	Spain U17	3	(0)
2000	Spain U18	2	(0)
Medal record
Representing Spain
UEFA European Under-16 Championship
Winner	1999 Czech Republic
- * Club domestic league appearances and goals

Enrique Corrales Martín (born 1 March 1982) is a Spanish former professional footballer who played as a left-back.

== Club career ==
Corrales was born in Seville, Andalusia. A product of Real Madrid's youth system, he played mainly for their reserves (adding a sole first-team competitive appearance in the 2–1 loss at CD Toledo in the 2000–01 Copa del Rey) as a senior before moving to CA Osasuna for 2004–05. He made his La Liga debut on 29 August 2004 in a 1–1 home draw against Athletic Bilbao, totalling 27 appearances in his first season.

In July 2008, Corrales signed for RCD Mallorca, starting in his first year save for the final weeks, to also newly signed Ayoze. In the following campaign, as the Balearic Islands club finished in fifth position and qualified for the UEFA Europa League, he completely lost the battle for first-choice status, playing only seven matches but starting in the Copa del Rey.

With a new player making the first team in his position for 2010–11, Kevin García, Corrales featured even less for Mallorca (two league games, 128 minutes). On 28 July 2011, aged 29, the free agent joined another top-division side, agreeing to a one-year contract at recently promoted Granada CF; however, after failing to convince manager Fabri, he cut ties with the Andalusians and signed with UD Las Palmas in August.

== Honours ==
Spain U16

- UEFA European Under-16 Championship: 1999
