= Ayoze Díaz =

Spanish footballer

Ayoze
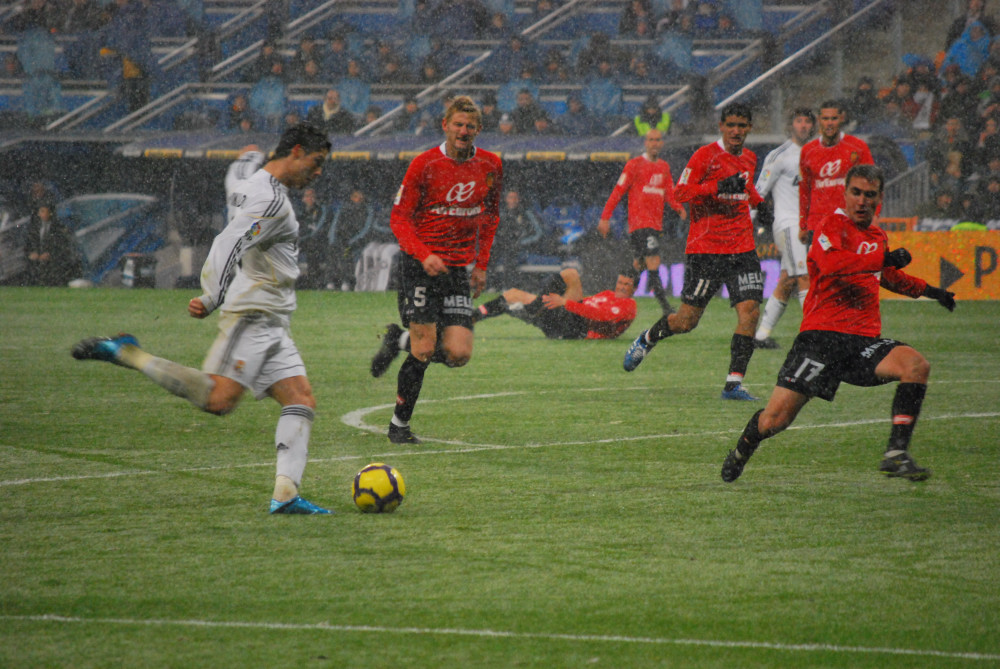
- Ayoze (far right) with Mallorca in 2010

Personal information
- Full name: Ayoze Díaz Díaz
- Date of birth: 25 May 1982 (age 44)
- Place of birth: La Laguna, Spain
- Height: 1.75 m (5 ft 9 in)
- Position: Left-back

Youth career
- Tenerife

Senior career*
Years	Team	Apps	(Gls)
1999–2002	Tenerife B	38	(2)
2000–2003	Tenerife	39	(0)
2001–2002	→ Lanzarote (loan)	18	(2)
2003–2008	Racing Santander	98	(3)
2006–2007	→ Ciudad Murcia (loan)	34	(1)
2008–2011	Mallorca	67	(0)
2011–2013	Deportivo La Coruña	41	(0)
2014	Tenerife	13	(0)
Total		348	(8)

Managerial career
- 2015–2017: Granadilla (assistant)
- * Club domestic league appearances and goals

Ayoze Díaz Díaz (born 25 May 1982), known simply as Ayoze, is a Spanish former professional footballer who played as a left-back.

== Club career ==
=== Tenerife and Racing ===
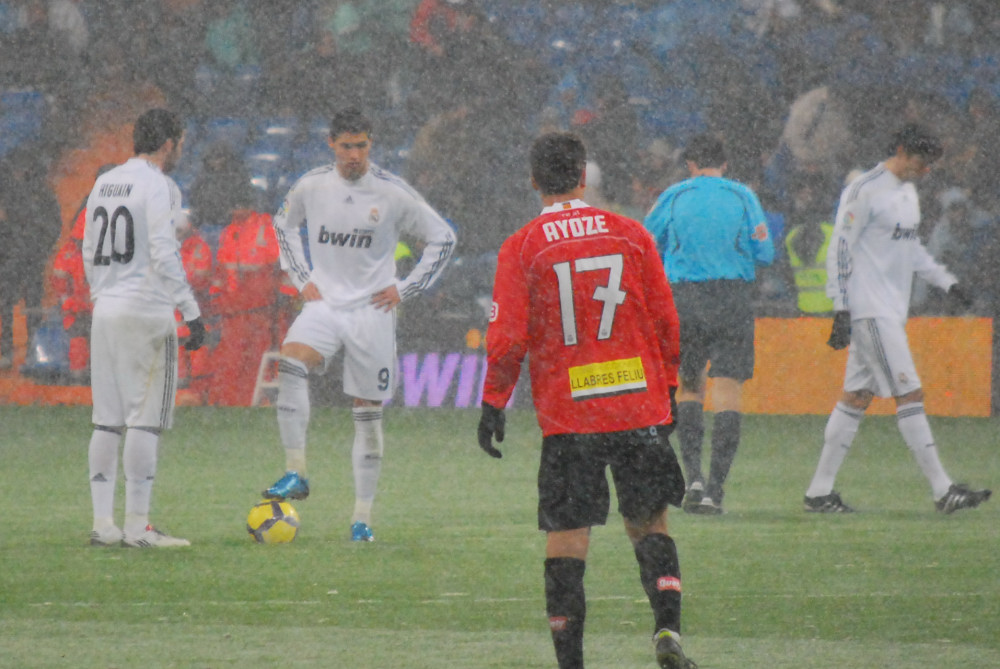
Ayoze in action for Mallorca against Real Madrid

Born in San Cristóbal de La Laguna, Canary Islands, and come through the ranks of local CD Tenerife, Ayoze made his debut with the first team in 1999–2000. In the summer of 2003, after just one full season in the Segunda División, he joined La Liga club Racing de Santander, where he was relatively used as a defender or midfielder in his first three years (with a loan to soon-to-be-extinct Ciudad de Murcia in between).

During the 2007–08 campaign, as the Cantabria side achieved a first-ever qualification for the UEFA Cup, Ayoze became the starter, relegating historical and veteran Luis Fernández to the bench.

=== Mallorca ===
Ayoze signed a three-year contract with RCD Mallorca in July 2008, replacing Sevilla FC-bound Fernando Navarro. In his first year he initially backed up another newly-signed, Enrique Corrales, but finished in the starting XI.

In the 2009–10 season, as Mallorca finished in fifth position and qualified for the Europa League, Ayoze completely won the battle for first-choice status over Corrales, appearing in 33 matches.

Before retiring in 2014 at age 32, Ayoze represented Deportivo de La Coruña and Tenerife. He won the second tier with the former in 2011–12, contributing 27 games to the feat.

== Honours ==
Deportivo

- Segunda División: 2011–12
