= 2004–05 Athletic Bilbao season =

Athletic Bilbao
2004–05 season
- President: Fernando Lamikiz Garai
- Head coach: Ernesto Valverde
- Stadium: San Mamés
- La Liga: 9th
- Copa del Rey: Semi-finals
- UEFA Cup: Round of 32
- Top goalscorer: League: Ismael Urzaiz (12 goals); All: Santi Ezquerro (19 goals)

The 2004–05 season was the 104th season in Athletic Bilbao's history and their 74th consecutive season in La Liga, the top division of Spanish football.

== Season summary ==
In the previous season, new manager Ernesto Valverde guided Athletic Bilbao to 5th place in La Liga, their highest placing in six seasons. This also allowed them their first European participation since 1998, qualifying for the 2004–05 UEFA Cup.

Valverde's second season in charge was less successful in the league, as Athletic suffered three more losses than the year before and slipped to 9th. They enjoyed more success in the Copa del Rey, reaching the semifinals before being knocked out on penalties by eventual champions Real Betis.

Their European adventure began in the UEFA Cup first round, where they were drawn against Trabzonspor of Turkey. Despite losing the away first leg 3–2, they qualified for the group stage by winning 2–0 at home. They were drawn in Group B, and suffered another defeat in Turkey, this time against Beşiktaş. However, they won their other three games - against Parma of Italy, Steaua București of Romania, and a crushing 7–1 victory over Standard Liège of Belgium - to progress as group winners. Their opponents in the next round were Austria Wien, and despite a creditable 0–0 draw in the away leg, Bilbao were eliminated after a 2–1 defeat at home.

Valverde left his post at the end of the season, and was replaced by José Luis Mendilibar. Mendilibar lasted only until the following October, while Valverde would return to the club for a second spell as head coach in 2013.

== Squad statistics ==
=== Appearances and goals ===
No.	Pos	Nat	Player	Total		La Liga		Copa del Rey		UEFA Cup	
No.	Pos	Nat	Player	Apps	Goals	Apps	Goals	Apps	Goals	Apps	Goals
1	GK	(Spain) ESP	Iñaki Lafuente	12	0	0	0	8	0	4	0
2	DF	(Spain) ESP	Javier Casas	27	0	14+5	0	5+1	0	2	0
3	DF	(Spain) ESP	Asier del Horno	43	7	23+6	3	4+2	1	6+2	3
4	DF	(Spain) ESP	Aitor Karanka	12	0	5+1	0	3	0	2+1	0
5	MF	(Spain) ESP	Felipe Guréndez	4	0	2+2	0	0	0	0	0
6	MF	(Spain) ESP	Óscar Vales	0	0	0	0	0	0	0	0
8	MF	(Spain) ESP	Julen Guerrero	18	3	0+12	3	3+1	0	0+2	0
9	FW	(Spain) ESP	Santi Ezquerro	47	19	31+1	11	4+4	3	7	5
10	MF	(Spain) ESP	Francisco Yeste	42	13	24+3	8	5+2	2	8	3
11	MF	(Spain) ESP	Javi González	14	0	7+3	0	0+2	0	1+1	0
12	DF	(Spain) ESP	Jesús María Lacruz	21	2	12+4	2	2+1	0	1+1	0
13	GK	(Spain) ESP	Dani Aranzubia	42	0	37	0	0+1	0	4	0
14	DF	(Spain) ESP	Luis Prieto	44	0	28+2	0	6	0	8	0
15	DF	(Spain) ESP	Andoni Iraola	49	6	31+3	4	7	1	8	1
16	MF	(Spain) ESP	Pablo Orbaiz	50	5	35	3	6+1	2	7+1	0
17	FW	(Spain) ESP	Joseba Etxeberria	48	6	30+3	3	6+1	1	8	2
18	MF	(Spain) ESP	Carlos Gurpegui	50	6	34	4	7+1	0	8	2
19	DF	(Spain) ESP	Ander Murillo	43	0	29+2	0	5	0	6+1	0
20	FW	(Spain) ESP	Ismael Urzaiz	44	12	19+12	12	4+1	0	5+3	0
21	MF	(Spain) ESP	Jonan García	15	0	6+7	0	2	0	0	0
22	FW	(Spain) ESP	Joseba Arriaga	19	0	6+8	0	2	0	1+2	0
23	MF	(Spain) ESP	Tiko	42	3	22+9	3	5+1	0	2+3	0
24	DF	(Spain) ESP	César	8	0	3+4	0	1	0	0	0
27	MF	(Spain) ESP	Aritz Solabarrieta	13	0	4+7	0	0+2	0	0	0
28	MF	(Spain) ESP	Endika Bordas	1	0	0	0	0	0	0+1	0
30	GK	(Spain) ESP	Roberto Pampín	2	0	1+1	0	0	0	0	0
31	DF	(Spain) ESP	Jon Moya	2	0	1+1	0	0	0	0	0
32	FW	(Spain) ESP	Fernando Llorente	20	6	9+6	3	3+1	3	0+1	0
	FW	(Spain) ESP	Igor Angulo	1	0	0	0	0	0	0+1	0
	GK	(Spain) ESP	Oinatz Aulestia	0	0	0	0	0	0	0	0
	FW	(Spain) ESP	Gorka Azkorra	3	0	0	0	0	0	0+3	0

== Results ==
=== La Liga ===
==== League table ====
Pos	Team	Pld	W	D	L	GF	GA	GD	Pts	Qualification or relegation
7	Valencia	38	14	16	8	54	39	+15	58	Qualification for the Intertoto Cup third round
8	Deportivo La Coruña	38	12	15	11	46	50	−4	51 (Note: DEP: 8 pts; ATH: 4 pts → ATH 1–0 MLG; MLG: 4 pts → MLG 1–0 ATH)	Qualification for the Intertoto Cup second round
9	Athletic Bilbao	38	14	9	15	59	54	+5	51	Qualification for the Intertoto Cup second round
10	Málaga	38	15	6	17	40	48	−8	51	
11	Atlético Madrid	38	13	11	14	40	34	+6	50 (Note: ATM 1–1 ZAR; ZAR 0–0 ATM)	

Source: LFP
Rules for classification: 1st points; 2nd head-to-head points; 3rd head-to-head goal difference; 4th head-to-head goals scored; 5th goal difference; 6th number of goals scored; 7th Fair-play points

=== UEFA Cup ===
==== First round ====
16 September 2004	Trabzonspor (Turkey)	3–2	(Spain) Athletic Bilbao	Hüseyin Avni Aker Stadium, Trabzon
19:00	González 25' (o.g.); Yılmaz 28'; Karadeniz 69'	Report	Gurpegui 73' del Horno 80'	Referee: Stuart Dougal (Scotland)

30 September 2004	Athletic Bilbao (Spain)	2–0	(Turkey) Trabzonspor	San Mamés Stadium, Bilbao
21:30	Ezquerro 5'; Yeste 61'	Report		Referee: Tom Henning Øvrebø (Norway)

Athletic Bilbao won 4–3 on aggregate

==== Group B ====
Team	Pld	W	D	L	GF	GA	GD	Pts
(Spain) Athletic Bilbao	4	3	0	1	11	4	+7	9
(Romania) Steaua București	4	2	0	2	4	3	+1	6
(Italy) Parma	4	2	0	2	5	6	−1	6
(Turkey) Beşiktaş	4	1	1	2	7	7	0	4
(Belgium) Standard Liège	4	1	1	2	4	11	−7	4

Source: https://www.rsssf.org/ec/ec200405.html

21 October 2004	Athletic Bilbao (Spain)	2–0	(Italy) Parma	San Mamés Stadium, Bilbao
21:00	Gurpegui 8' del Horno 49'	Report		Attendance: 24,000; Referee: Zsolt Szabó (Hungary)

4 November 2004	Beşiktaş (Turkey)	3–1	(Spain) Athletic Bilbao	BJK İnönü Stadium, Istanbul
19:30	Güneş 26'; Carew 63'; Akın 89'	Report	Ezquerro 49'	Attendance: 32,000; Referee: Florian Meyer (Germany)

1 December 2004	Athletic Bilbao (Spain)	1–0	(Romania) Steaua București	San Mamés Stadium, Bilbao
20:45	Etxeberria 45'	Report		Attendance: 32,000; Referee: Georgios Kasnaferis (Greece)

16 December 2004	Standard Liège (Belgium)	1–7	(Spain) Athletic Bilbao	Stade Maurice Dufrasne, Liège
20:45	Onyewu 15'	Report	Ezquerro 6', 9', 54'; Yeste 35'; Iraola 58' del Horno 63'; Etxeberria 71'	Attendance: 7,000; Referee: Martin Ingvarsson (Sweden)

==== Round of 32 ====
24 February 2005	Austria Wien	0–0	(Spain) Athletic Bilbao	Ernst-Happel-Stadion, Vienna
19:30 (CET)		Report		Attendance: 15,000; Referee: Alon Yefet (Israel)

27 February 2005	Athletic Bilbao (Spain)	1–2	Austria Wien	San Mamés Stadium, Bilbao
18:00 (CET)	Yeste 19' (pen.)	Report	Sionko 35', 70'	Attendance: 30,000; Referee: Grzegorz Gilewski (Poland)

Austria Wien won 2–1 on aggregate

== See also ==
- 2004–05 Copa del Rey
- Athletic Bilbao in European football
