= 2005–06 Athletic Bilbao season =

Athletic Bilbao
2005–06 season
- President: Fernando Lamikiz Garai
- Head coach: José Luis Mendilibar (to 31 October); Javier Clemente (from 31 October)
- Stadium: San Mamés
- La Liga: 12th
- Copa del Rey: Round of 16
- UEFA Intertoto Cup: Round 2
- Top goalscorer: League: Aritz Aduriz (6 goals); All: Aritz Aduriz (6 goals)

The 2005–06 season was the 105th season in Athletic Bilbao's history and their 75th consecutive season in La Liga, the top division of Spanish football.

== Squad statistics ==
=== Appearances and goals ===
No.	Pos	Nat	Player	Total		La Liga		Copa del Rey		Intertoto Cup	
No.	Pos	Nat	Player	Apps	Goals	Apps	Goals	Apps	Goals	Apps	Goals
1	GK	(Spain) ESP	Iñaki Lafuente	24	0	20	0	2	0	2	0
2	DF	(Spain) ESP	Unai Expósito	28	0	19+5	0	4	0	0	0
3	DF	(Spain) ESP	Javier Casas	29	2	21+3	2	2+1	0	2	0
4	DF	(Spain) ESP	Aitor Karanka	0	0	0	0	0	0	0	0
5	MF	(Spain) ESP	Felipe Guréndez	1	1	0+1	1	0	0	0	0
6	MF	(Spain) ESP	Endika Bordas	4	0	1+1	0	1+1	0	0	0
7	MF	(Spain) ESP	Tiko	32	1	6+22	1	4	0	0	0
8	MF	(Spain) ESP	Joseba Garmendia	0	0	0	0	0	0	0	0
8	MF	(Spain) ESP	Julen Guerrero	21	0	4+13	0	2	0	2	0
9	FW	(Spain) ESP	Fernando Llorente	25	4	12+10	2	1+2	2	0	0
10	MF	(Spain) ESP	Francisco Yeste	38	5	34+1	4	1+2	1	0	0
11	MF	(Spain) ESP	Javi González	9	2	3+2	0	2	1	1+1	1
12	DF	(Spain) ESP	Jesús María Lacruz	34	3	25+5	3	3+1	0	0	0
13	GK	(Spain) ESP	Dani Aranzubia	20	0	18	0	2	0	0	0
14	DF	(Spain) ESP	Luis Prieto	37	4	36	4	1	0	0	0
15	DF	(Spain) ESP	Andoni Iraola	42	3	34+4	3	3+1	0	0	0
16	MF	(Spain) ESP	Pablo Orbaiz	40	3	36	3	4	0	0	0
17	FW	(Spain) ESP	Joseba Etxeberria	31	4	24+5	4	2	0	0	0
18	MF	(Spain) ESP	Carlos Gurpegui	33	2	30	2	3	0	0	0
19	DF	(Spain) ESP	Ander Murillo	29	0	19+7	0	2+1	0	0	0
20	FW	(Spain) ESP	Ismael Urzaiz	27	3	16+10	3	0+1	0	0	0
21	MF	(Spain) ESP	Jonan García	2	0	0	0	0	0	1+1	0
22	FW	(Spain) ESP	Joseba Arriaga	1	0	0	0	0	0	1	0
23	FW	(Spain) ESP	Aritz Aduriz	17	6	13+2	6	2	0	0	0
25	GK	(Spain) ESP	Miguel Escalona	0	0	0	0	0	0	0	0
27	MF	(Spain) ESP	Aritz Solabarrieta	1	0	0	0	0	0	1	0
28	DF	(Spain) ESP	Asier Ormazábal	2	0	0	0	0	0	1+1	0
29	DF	(Spain) ESP	Ustaritz Aldekoaotalora	18	0	17	0	0	0	1	0
30	DF	(Venezuela) VEN	Fernando Amorebieta	19	0	15	0	1+1	0	2	0
33	MF	(Spain) ESP	Pablo Paredes	1	0	0	0	0	0	1	0
36	MF	(Spain) ESP	David de Paula	2	0	0	0	0	0	2	0
37	FW	(Spain) ESP	David Lizoain	2	0	0	0	0	0	0+2	0
38	FW	(Spain) ESP	Mikel Dañobeitia	26	1	8+14	1	2+1	0	1	0
39	MF	(Spain) ESP	Gontzal Rodríguez	1	0	0	0	0	0	1	0
40	MF	(Spain) ESP	Mikel Martins	0	0	0	0	0	0	0	0
42	DF	(Spain) ESP	Eder Martínez	2	0	0	0	0	0	1+1	0
48	FW	(Spain) ESP	Urko Arroyo	1	0	0+1	0	0	0	0	0
	MF	(Spain) ESP	Beñat	0	0	0	0	0	0	0	0
	MF	(Spain) ESP	Ibón Gutiérrez	8	0	5+1	0	0	0	2	0
	DF	(Spain) ESP	Javier Tarantino	3	0	2+1	0	0	0	0	0

== See also ==
- 2005–06 La Liga
- 2005–06 Copa del Rey
- 2005 UEFA Intertoto Cup
- Athletic Bilbao in European football
