= 2003–04 Athletic Bilbao season =

Athletic Bilbao
2003–04 season
- President: Ignacio Ugartetxe
- Head coach: Ernesto Valverde
- Stadium: San Mamés
- La Liga: 5th
- Copa del Rey: Round of 64
- Top goalscorer: League: Francisco Yeste (11 goals); All: Francisco Yeste (11 goals)

The 2003–04 season was the 103rd season in Athletic Bilbao's history and their 73rd consecutive season in La Liga, the top division of Spanish football.

== Season summary ==
At the end of the previous season, head coach Jupp Heynckes left his position to return to his native Germany as manager of Schalke 04. B team coach Ernesto Valverde, who also represented Athletic during his playing career, was promoted in his place.

Valverde's first season in charge saw a successful La Liga campaign, as Bilbao finished in fifth place and qualified for the 2004–05 UEFA Cup. This constituted their best league placing and first European qualification for six years.

Athletic were somewhat less successful in the Copa del Rey, suffering a humiliating defeat in their first match at the hands of Segunda División B side Gimnástica de Torrelavega. This marked their earliest exit from the cup since 1993–94.

== Squad statistics ==
=== Appearances and goals ===
No.	Pos	Nat	Player	Total		La Liga		Copa del Rey	
No.	Pos	Nat	Player	Apps	Goals	Apps	Goals	Apps	Goals
1	GK	(Spain) ESP	Iñaki Lafuente	5	0	4	0	1	0
2	DF	(Spain) ESP	Ander Murillo	5	0	2+2	0	0+1	0
3	DF	(Spain) ESP	Aitor Larrazábal	15	1	9+6	1	0	0
4	DF	(Spain) ESP	Aitor Karanka	35	0	33+1	0	1	0
5	MF	(Spain) ESP	Felipe Guréndez	3	0	0+2	0	1	0
6	MF	(Spain) ESP	Óscar Vales	2	0	2	0	0	0
8	MF	(Spain) ESP	Julen Guerrero	13	1	1+12	1	0	0
9	FW	(Spain) ESP	Santi Ezquerro	36	3	29+6	3	0+1	0
10	MF	(Spain) ESP	Francisco Yeste	31	11	24+6	11	1	0
11	MF	(Spain) ESP	Javi González	25	0	22+3	0	0	0
12	DF	(Spain) ESP	Jesús María Lacruz	25	1	20+5	1	0	0
13	GK	(Spain) ESP	Dani Aranzubia	34	0	34	0	0	0
14	DF	(Spain) ESP	Luis Prieto	30	0	28+1	0	1	0
15	DF	(Spain) ESP	Andoni Iraola	31	5	24+6	5	1	0
16	MF	(Spain) ESP	Pablo Orbaiz	27	0	18+8	0	0+1	0
17	FW	(Spain) ESP	Joseba Etxeberria	35	6	34	6	1	0
18	MF	(Spain) ESP	Carlos Gurpegui	31	1	29+1	1	1	0
19	DF	(Spain) ESP	Asier del Horno	31	5	29+2	5	0	0
20	FW	(Spain) ESP	Ismael Urzaiz	38	8	29+8	8	1	0
21	MF	(Spain) ESP	Jonan García	23	2	7+16	2	0	0
22	FW	(Spain) ESP	Joseba Arriaga	15	2	3+11	2	1	0
23	MF	(Spain) ESP	Tiko	30	6	29	5	1	1
24	DF	(Spain) ESP	César	10	0	7+3	0	0	0
25	MF	(Spain) ESP	Carlos Merino	1	0	0+1	0	0	0
28	MF	(Spain) ESP	Endika Bordas	9	0	1+8	0	0	0
	GK	(Spain) ESP	Oinatz Aulestia	0	0	0	0	0	0

== Results ==
=== La Liga ===
==== League table ====
Pos	Team	Pld	W	D	L	GF	GA	GD	Pts	Qualification or relegation
3	Deportivo La Coruña	38	21	8	9	60	34	+26	71	Qualification for the Champions League third qualifying round
4	Real Madrid	38	21	7	10	72	54	+18	70	Qualification for the Champions League third qualifying round
5	Athletic Bilbao	38	15	11	12	53	49	+4	56	Qualification for the UEFA Cup first round
6	Sevilla	38	15	10	13	56	45	+11	55 (Note: SEV 2–0 ATM; ATM 2–1 SEV)	Qualification for the UEFA Cup first round
7	Atlético Madrid	38	15	10	13	51	53	−2	55	Qualification for the Intertoto Cup third round

Source: LFP
Rules for classification: 1st points; 2nd head-to-head points; 3rd head-to-head goal difference; 4th head-to-head goals scored; 5th goal difference; 6th number of goals scored; 7th Fair-play points

== See also ==
- 2003–04 La Liga
- 2003–04 Copa del Rey
