= 2002–03 Athletic Bilbao season =

Athletic Bilbao
2002–03 season
- President: Javier Uría
- Head coach: Jupp Heynckes
- Stadium: San Mamés
- La Liga: 7th
- Copa del Rey: Round of 32
- Top goalscorer: League: Joseba Etxeberria (14 goals); All: Joseba Etxeberria; Ismael Urzaiz (14 each)

The 2002–03 season was the 102nd season in Athletic Bilbao's history and their 72nd consecutive season in La Liga, the top division of Spanish football.

== Season summary ==
In Jupp Heynckes's second season in charge, Athletic Bilbao made a slight improvement in the league, climbing from ninth to seventh place, their highest placing since finishing as runners-up in 1997–98. They were eliminated from the Copa del Rey at the last 32 stage by Basque rivals Real Unión, who were ranked two divisions below Athletic, in Segunda División B.

Heynckes departed at the end of the season to take up the manager's role at Schalke 04 in his native Germany. He was replaced by former Bilbao player Ernesto Valverde, who was promoted from coaching the B team.

== Squad statistics ==
=== Appearances and goals ===
No.	Pos	Nat	Player	Total		La Liga		Copa del Rey	
No.	Pos	Nat	Player	Apps	Goals	Apps	Goals	Apps	Goals
1	GK	(Spain) ESP	Iñaki Lafuente	13	0	13	0	0	0
2	DF	(Spain) ESP	Iñigo Larrainzar	7	0	3+2	0	2	0
3	DF	(Spain) ESP	Aitor Larrazábal	22	2	16+5	2	1	0
4	DF	(Spain) ESP	Aitor Karanka	25	2	21+3	2	1	0
5	DF	(Spain) ESP	Carlos García	2	0	0+1	0	0+1	0
6	MF	(Spain) ESP	Josu Urrutia	1	0	0	0	1	0
7	MF	(Spain) ESP	Óscar Vales	25	0	18+6	0	1	0
8	MF	(Spain) ESP	Julen Guerrero	16	2	3+11	0	2	2
9	FW	(Spain) ESP	Santi Ezquerro	37	10	28+7	10	1+1	0
10	MF	(Spain) ESP	Francisco Yeste	29	6	22+6	6	1	0
11	MF	(Spain) ESP	Javi González	32	0	29+2	0	1	0
12	DF	(Spain) ESP	Jesús María Lacruz	23	0	21+1	0	1	0
13	GK	(Spain) ESP	Dani Aranzubia	27	0	25	0	2	0
14	DF	(Spain) ESP	Luis Prieto	18	0	14+3	0	1	0
15	MF	(Spain) ESP	Felipe Guréndez	6	0	0+6	0	0	0
16	MF	(Spain) ESP	Pablo Orbaiz	6	0	3+2	0	1	0
17	FW	(Spain) ESP	Joseba Etxeberria	33	14	32+1	14	0	0
18	MF	(Spain) ESP	Bittor Alkiza	32	1	28+3	1	1	0
19	DF	(Spain) ESP	Asier del Horno	25	4	22+2	4	1	0
20	FW	(Spain) ESP	Ismael Urzaiz	33	14	29+2	13	1+1	1
21	DF	(Spain) ESP	Ander Murillo	18	0	14+4	0	0	0
22	DF	(Spain) ESP	Aitor Ocio	20	1	12+7	1	1	0
23	MF	(Spain) ESP	Tiko	33	2	18+14	2	0+1	0
24	DF	(Spain) ESP	César	10	0	8+2	0	0	0
25	MF	(Spain) ESP	Carlos Merino	0	0	0	0	0	0
28	MF	(Spain) ESP	Carlos Gurpegui	28	4	26+1	4	0+1	0
29	FW	(Spain) ESP	Joseba Arriaga	30	1	13+15	1	1+1	0
30	FW	(Spain) ESP	Aritz Aduriz	4	0	0+3	0	1	0
31	GK	(Spain) ESP	Miguel Escalona	0	0	0	0	0	0
48	MF	(Spain) ESP	Igor Angulo	1	0	0+1	0	0	0

== Results ==
=== La Liga ===
==== League table ====
Pos	Team	Pld	W	D	L	GF	GA	GD	Pts	Qualification or relegation
5	Valencia	38	17	9	12	56	35	+21	60	Qualification for the UEFA Cup first round
6	Barcelona	38	15	11	12	63	47	+16	56	Qualification for the UEFA Cup first round
7	Athletic Bilbao	38	15	10	13	63	61	+2	55	
8	Real Betis	38	14	12	12	56	53	+3	54	
9	Mallorca	38	14	10	14	49	56	−7	52	Qualification for the UEFA Cup first round (Note: Mallorca entered UEFA Cup as winners of 2002–03 Copa del Rey)

Source: LFP
Rules for classification: 1st points; 2nd head-to-head points; 3rd head-to-head goal difference; 4th head-to-head away goals scored; 5th goal difference; 6th number of goals scored; 7th Fair-play points

== See also ==
- 2002–03 La Liga
- 2002–03 Copa del Rey
