= 2001–02 Athletic Bilbao season =

Athletic Bilbao
2001–02 season
- President: Javier Uría
- Head coach: Jupp Heynckes
- Stadium: San Mamés
- La Liga: 9th
- Copa del Rey: Semi-finals
- Top goalscorer: League: Ismael Urzaiz (16 goals); All: Ismael Urzaiz (18 goals)
- Average home league attendance: 33,211

The 2001–02 season was the 101st season in Athletic Bilbao's history and their 71st consecutive season in La Liga, the top division of Spanish football.

== Season summary ==
Ahead of the season, head coach Txetxu Rojo departed after only one season in charge, returning to his previous post at Real Zaragoza. In his place, Athletic hired German Jupp Heynckes, who had been out of work since leaving Portuguese club Benfica the previous September. Heynckes was returning to San Mamés, having previously coached the club between 1992 and 1994, and he had had considerable success in the meantime, winning the UEFA Champions League with Real Madrid in 1998.

Heynckes was able to guide the Bilbao side back into the La Liga top ten, securing a ninth-place finish. They enjoyed a successful run in the Copa del Rey, reaching the semifinals before being defeated by eventual runners-up Real Madrid. This marked their best cup run since reaching the same stage in 1986–87.

== Squad statistics ==
=== Appearances and goals ===
No.	Pos	Nat	Player	Total		La Liga		Copa del Rey	
No.	Pos	Nat	Player	Apps	Goals	Apps	Goals	Apps	Goals
1	GK	(Spain) ESP	Iñaki Lafuente	30	0	30	0	0	0
2	DF	(Spain) ESP	Iñigo Larrainzar	22	0	18+1	0	3	0
3	DF	(Spain) ESP	Aitor Larrazábal	30	3	25+1	3	4	0
4	DF	(Spain) ESP	Rafael Alkorta	6	1	5+1	1	0	0
5	DF	(Spain) ESP	Carlos García	39	2	17+15	2	4+3	0
6	MF	(Spain) ESP	Josu Urrutia	24	1	14+5	1	5	0
7	MF	(Spain) ESP	Óscar Vales	30	0	25+2	0	3	0
8	MF	(Spain) ESP	Julen Guerrero	26	7	17+3	5	5+1	2
9	FW	(Spain) ESP	Santi Ezquerro	43	9	12+23	5	5+3	4
10	MF	(Spain) ESP	Francisco Yeste	28	3	22	2	5+1	1
11	MF	(Spain) ESP	Javi González	34	0	24+6	0	4	0
12	DF	(Spain) ESP	Jesús María Lacruz	30	0	24	0	6	0
13	MF	(Spain) ESP	Andoni Imaz	0	0	0	0	0	0
14	DF	(Spain) ESP	Roberto Ríos	5	0	2+2	0	1	0
15	MF	(Spain) ESP	Felipe Guréndez	21	0	10+5	0	5+1	0
16	MF	(Spain) ESP	Pablo Orbaiz	32	1	21+5	1	4+2	0
17	FW	(Spain) ESP	Joseba Etxeberria	37	9	27+4	8	3+3	1
18	MF	(Spain) ESP	Bittor Alkiza	36	1	28+5	1	3	0
19	DF	(Spain) ESP	Asier del Horno	12	1	9+1	1	2	0
20	FW	(Spain) ESP	Ismael Urzaiz	42	18	34+2	16	4+2	2
21	FW	(Spain) ESP	David Karanka	8	2	0+6	1	2	1
22	DF	(Spain) ESP	Aitor Ocio	17	0	12+2	0	3	0
23	MF	(Spain) ESP	Tiko	38	11	22+10	7	3+3	4
24	MF	(Spain) ESP	David Cuéllar	10	0	3+3	0	4	0
25	GK	(Spain) ESP	Dani Aranzubia	16	0	8	0	8	0
39	MF	(Spain) ESP	Carlos Gurpegui	4	0	2+2	0	0	0
46	DF	(Spain) ESP	Ander Murillo	17	0	7+4	0	2+4	0

== Results ==
=== La Liga ===
==== League table ====
Pos	Team	Pld	W	D	L	GF	GA	GD	Pts	Qualification or relegation
7	Alavés (Note: Since Deportivo and Real Madrid, finalists of 2001–02 Copa del Rey, were qualified for the 2002–03 UEFA Champions League, Alavés entered UEFA Cup as best qualified in no european places (7th placed))	38	17	3	18	41	44	−3	54	Qualification for the UEFA Cup first round
8	Sevilla	38	14	11	13	51	40	+11	53 (Note: SEV: 7 pts → SEV 3–3 ATH; ATH: 7 pts → ATH 0–1 SEV; MLG: 3 pts)	
9	Athletic Bilbao	38	14	11	13	54	66	−12	53	
10	Málaga	38	13	14	11	44	44	0	53	Qualification for the Intertoto Cup third round
11	Rayo Vallecano	38	13	10	15	46	52	−6	49	

Source: LFP
Rules for classification: 1st points; 2nd head-to-head points; 3rd head-to-head goal difference; 4th head-to-head goals scored; 5th goal difference; 6th number of goals scored; 7th Fair-play points

== See also ==
- 2001–02 La Liga
- 2001–02 Copa del Rey
