= 2007–08 Athletic Bilbao season =

Athletic Bilbao
2007–08 season
- President: Fernando García Macua
- Head coach: Joaquín Caparrós
- Stadium: San Mamés
- La Liga: 11th
- Copa del Rey: Quarter-finals
- Top goalscorer: League: Fernando Llorente (11 goals); All: Fernando Llorente (12 goals)

The 2007–08 season was the 107th season in Athletic Bilbao's history and their 77th consecutive season in La Liga, the top division of Spanish football.

== Squad statistics ==
=== Appearances and goals ===
No.	Pos	Nat	Player	Total		La Liga		Copa del Rey	
No.	Pos	Nat	Player	Apps	Goals	Apps	Goals	Apps	Goals
1	GK	(Spain) ESP	Armando	16	0	16	0	0	0
2	DF	(Spain) ESP	Unai Expósito	4	0	2+1	0	1	0
3	DF	(Spain) ESP	Asier del Horno	20	1	12+3	0	5	1
4	DF	(Spain) ESP	Ustaritz Aldekoaotalora	23	0	14+6	0	3	0
5	DF	(Venezuela) VEN	Fernando Amorebieta	40	1	34	0	6	1
6	DF	(Spain) ESP	Iban Zubiaurre	2	0	1	0	0+1	0
7	MF	(Spain) ESP	Tiko	5	0	2	0	2+1	0
8	MF	(Spain) ESP	Joseba Garmendia	23	1	8+10	1	1+4	0
9	FW	(Spain) ESP	Fernando Llorente	40	12	25+10	11	4+1	1
10	MF	(Spain) ESP	Francisco Yeste	28	3	21+3	3	4	0
11	MF	(Spain) ESP	Igor Gabilondo	31	4	21+5	4	5	0
12	DF	(Spain) ESP	Koikili Lertxundi	29	1	26+2	1	1	0
13	GK	(Spain) ESP	Dani Aranzubia	16	0	9+1	0	5+1	0
14	DF	(Spain) ESP	Luis Prieto	5	0	1+2	0	0+2	0
15	DF	(Spain) ESP	Andoni Iraola	41	2	35+1	1	5	1
16	MF	(Spain) ESP	Pablo Orbaiz	25	0	20+3	0	2	0
17	FW	(Spain) ESP	Joseba Etxeberria	25	4	20+5	4	0	0
18	MF	(Spain) ESP	Carlos Gurpegui	5	0	5	0	0	0
19	DF	(Spain) ESP	Ander Murillo	7	0	1+5	0	1	0
20	DF	(Spain) ESP	Aitor Ocio	30	0	27	0	3	0
21	MF	(Spain) ESP	David Cuéllar	7	0	1+6	0	0	0
22	MF	(Spain) ESP	Iñaki Muñoz	19	2	3+10	0	5+1	2
23	FW	(Spain) ESP	Aritz Aduriz	38	8	20+13	7	3+2	1
24	MF	(Spain) ESP	Javi Martínez	36	0	33+1	0	1+1	0
25	MF	(Spain) ESP	David López	35	2	20+11	2	3+1	0
26	GK	(Spain) ESP	Raúl Fernández	0	0	0	0	0	0
27	FW	(Spain) ESP	Markel Susaeta	34	6	23+6	4	4+1	2
28	GK	(Spain) ESP	Gorka Iraizoz	14	0	13	0	1	0
29	DF	(Spain) ESP	Javier Casas	0	0	0	0	0	0
45	DF	(Spain) ESP	Gaizka Bergara	0	0	0	0	0	0
45	MF	(Spain) ESP	Aitor Ramos	7	0	2+3	0	1+1	0
48	FW	(Spain) ESP	Urko Arroyo	1	0	1	0	0	0
	MF	(Spain) ESP	Néstor Susaeta	0	0	0	0	0	0
	FW	(Spain) ESP	Ion Vélez	9	0	2+7	0	0	0

== Competitions ==
=== La Liga ===
==== League table ====
Pos	Team	Pld	W	D	L	GF	GA	GD	Pts	Qualification or relegation
9	Deportivo La Coruña	38	15	7	16	46	47	−1	52 (Note: DEP 0–3 ALM; ALM 1–0 DEP)	Qualification for the Intertoto Cup third round
10	Valencia	38	15	6	17	48	62	−14	51	Qualification for the UEFA Cup first round (Note: Valencia entered UEFA Cup as winners of 2007–08 Copa del Rey.)
11	Athletic Bilbao	38	13	11	14	40	43	−3	50	
12	Espanyol	38	13	9	16	43	53	−10	48	
13	Real Betis	38	12	11	15	45	51	−6	47 (Note: BET 3–2 GET; GET 1–1 BET)	

Source: LFP
Rules for classification: 1st points; 2nd head-to-head points; 3rd head-to-head goal difference; 4th head-to-head goals scored; 5th goal difference; 6th number of goals scored; 7th Fair-play points

=== Copa del Rey ===
Quarter-finals

Team 1	Agg.	Team 2	1st leg	2nd leg
Racing de Santander	5–3	Athletic Bilbao	2–0	3–3
