= Igor Angulo =

Spanish footballer (born 1984)

Personal information
- Full name: Igor Angulo Alboniga
- Date of birth: 26 January 1984 (age 42)
- Place of birth: Bilbao, Spain
- Height: 1.81 m (5 ft 11 in)
- Position: Forward

Youth career
- 1995–1996: Danok Bat
- 1996–2002: Athletic Bilbao

Senior career*
Years	Team	Apps	(Gls)
2002–2003	Basconia	23	(5)
2003–2008	Bilbao Athletic	78	(7)
2003–2007	Athletic Bilbao	4	(0)
2004–2005	→ Gimnàstic (loan)	11	(0)
2006–2007	→ Cannes (loan)	27	(3)
2008–2010	Écija	52	(15)
2010–2011	Numancia	24	(0)
2011–2013	Real Unión	62	(20)
2013–2014	Enosis Neon	21	(9)
2014–2015	Apollon Smyrnis	25	(9)
2015–2016	Platanias	25	(8)
2016–2020	Górnik Zabrze	138	(80)
2020–2021	Goa	21	(14)
2021–2022	Mumbai City	19	(10)
Total		530	(180)

International career
2003	Spain U19	3	(1)
2003	Spain U20	2	(1)
2004	Spain U21	2	(0)
- * Club domestic league appearances and goals

Igor Angulo Alboniga (born 26 January 1984) is a Spanish former professional footballer who played as a forward.

Developed at Athletic Bilbao, he appeared in only five competitive matches during his spell at the club. He went on to make a name for himself in the Polish Ekstraklasa, surpassing the 80-goal mark for Górnik Zabrze. He also played professionally in France, Cyprus, Greece and India.

Angulo represented Spain at three youth levels.

== Club career ==
=== Athletic Bilbao ===
Born in Bilbao, Biscay, Angulo joined Athletic Bilbao's youth setup in 1996, aged 12, after starting out at Danok Bat CF. He made his debut as a senior with the farm team in 2002, in the Tercera División.

Angulo made his first-team — and La Liga — debut on 23 March 2003, coming on as a late substitute in a 2–1 away loss against RC Celta de Vigo. In June, he was promoted to the reserves in the Segunda División B.

On 30 December 2004, after appearing in only three league matches with the main squad, Angulo was loaned to Segunda División's Gimnàstic de Tarragona until the end of the season. After featuring regularly he returned to the Basques, and renewed his contract on 19 October 2005.

On 25 July 2006, Angulo moved abroad for the first time in his career, joining French Championnat National club AS Cannes in a season-long loan deal. Upon returning, he was again assigned to the B team.

Angulo cut ties with the Lions on 21 July 2008.

=== Spain ===
On 21 July 2008, Angulo moved to Écija Balompié in the third tier along with Athletic teammate Aitor Ramos. In his second season at the Andalusians he contributed nine goals in only 19 league matches, being the team's top scorer; highlights included a hat-trick in a 6–2 home rout of Jerez Industrial CF on 10 January 2010.

On 1 February 2010, Angulo signed a 2 1/2-year deal with division two side CD Numancia after his contract was terminated at Écija. He made his debut three days later, playing the last 29 minutes in a 3–1 home win over UD Las Palmas.

Angulo rescinded his contract with the Rojillos on 22 July 2011, after starting sparingly during the campaign. He joined Real Unión hours later, scoring a career-best 13 goals in 2012–13, being team top scorer and being linked to a number of clubs also in the third division.

=== Abroad ===
On 5 August 2013, Angulo moved to the Cypriot First Division with Enosis Neon Paralimni FC. On 21 November, aged already 29, he scored his first professional goal, netting in a 3–1 home loss against AEL Limassol.

Angulo switched clubs and countries again on 14 September 2014, joining Football League (Greece)'s Apollon Smyrnis FC. He continued competing abroad in subsequent seasons, in the Super League Greece with Platanias F.C. and in the Polish I liga with Górnik Zabrze, being crowned top scorer for the latter team in 2016–17 as they returned to the Ekstraklasa as runners-up. His strong form continued in the top tier, as his 23 league strikes saw him end the campaign as the second highest goalscorer at the age of 34, while Górnik finished fourth and qualified for the first qualifying round of the UEFA Europa League (their first continental participation since 1994).

In 2018–19, Angulo finished as the league's top scorer with 24 goals from 37 appearances. On 22 July 2020, the 36-year-old agreed to a one-year contract at Indian Super League's FC Goa.

Angulo signed with ISL defending champions Mumbai City FC on 30 July 2021. In March 2022, he was included in the club's AFC Champions League squad.

== International career ==
Angulo won seven caps for Spain at youth level, including two for the under-21s. He made his debut on 2 September 2004, starting and playing 68 minutes in a 3–1 win against Scotland in Alcoy.

== Career statistics ==
Appearances and goals by club, season and competition
Club	Season	League			National cup (Note: Includes Coupe de France, Copa del Rey, Cypriot Cup, Greek Cup, Polish Cup)		Continental		Total	
Club	Season	Division	Apps	Goals	Apps	Goals	Apps	Goals	Apps	Goals
Basconia	2002–03	Tercera División	23	5	—		—		23	5
Athletic Bilbao	2002–03	La Liga	1	0	0	0	—		1	0
Athletic Bilbao	2003–04	La Liga	0	0	0	0	0	0	0	0
Athletic Bilbao	2004–05	La Liga	3	0	0	0	1 (Note: Appearance in UEFA Cup)	0	4	0
Athletic Bilbao	2005–06	La Liga	0	0	0	0	0	0	0	0
Athletic Bilbao	2006–07	La Liga	0	0	0	0	—		0	0
Athletic Bilbao	2007–08	La Liga	0	0	0	0	—		0	0
Athletic Bilbao	Total		4	0	0	0	1	0	5	0
Bilbao Athletic	2003–04	Segunda División B	30	5	0	0	—		30	5
Bilbao Athletic	2005–06	Segunda División B	27	0	0	0	—		27	0
Bilbao Athletic	2007–08	Segunda División B	21	2	0	0	—		21	2
Bilbao Athletic	Total		78	7	0	0	0	0	78	7
Gimnàstic (loan)	2004–05	Segunda División	11	0	0	0	—		11	0
Cannes (loan)	2006–07	Championnat National	27	3	1	0	—		28	3
Écija	2008–09	Segunda División B	33	6	2	0	—		35	6
Écija	2009–10	Segunda División B	19	9	0	0	—		19	9
Écija	Total		52	15	2	0	—		54	15
Numancia	2009–10	Segunda División	6	0	0	0	—		6	0
Numancia	2010–11	Segunda División	18	0	1	0	—		19	0
Numancia	Total		24	0	1	0	—		25	0
Real Unión	2011–12	Segunda División B	30	7	0	0	—		30	7
Real Unión	2012–13	Segunda División B	32	13	0	0	—		32	13
Real Unión	Total		62	20	0	0	—		62	20
Enosis Neon	2013–14	Cypriot First Division	21	9	2	0	—		23	9
Apollon Smyrnis	2014–15	Football League	25	9	6	5	—		31	14
Platanias	2015–16	Super League Greece	25	8	3	0	—		28	8
Górnik Zabrze	2016–17	I liga	32	17	2	0	—		34	17
Górnik Zabrze	2017–18	Ekstraklasa	33	23	5	4	—		38	27
Górnik Zabrze	2018–19	Ekstraklasa	37	24	4	3	4 (Note: Appearances in UEFA Europa League)	1	45	28
Górnik Zabrze	2019–20	Ekstraklasa	36	16	1	0	—		37	16
Górnik Zabrze	Total		138	80	12	7	4	1	154	88
Goa	2020–21	Indian Super League	21	14	0	0	—		21	14
Mumbai City	2021–22	Indian Super League	19	10	0	0	1 (Note: Appearance in AFC Champions League)	0	20	10
Career total			530	180	27	12	6	1	563	193

== Honours ==
Individual

- Greek Cup top scorer: 2014–15
- Ekstraklasa top scorer: 2018–19
- I liga top scorer: 2016–17
- Polish Cup top scorer: 2017–18
- Indian Super League Golden Boot: 2020–21
- Ekstraklasa Forward of the Season: 2018–19
- Ekstraklasa Player of the Month: July 2017, August 2017, November 2017, April 2019
- I liga Team of the Season: 2016–17
- Piłka Nożna Foreigner of the Year: 2017
