= Fernando Llorente =

Spanish footballer (born 1985)

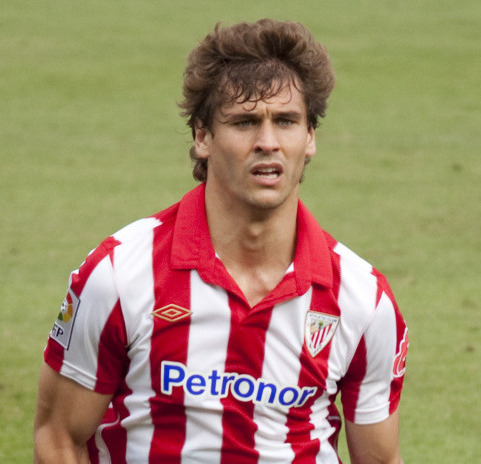
- Llorente with Athletic Bilbao in 2010

Personal information
- Full name: Fernando Javier Llorente Torres
- Date of birth: 26 February 1985 (age 41)
- Place of birth: Pamplona, Spain
- Height: 1.93 m (6 ft 4 in)
- Position: Striker

Youth career
- 1994–1995: Funes
- 1995–1996: River Ebro
- 1996–2003: Athletic Bilbao

Senior career*
Years	Team	Apps	(Gls)
2003–2004	Basconia	33	(12)
2004–2005	Bilbao Athletic	16	(4)
2005–2013	Athletic Bilbao	262	(85)
2013–2015	Juventus	66	(23)
2015–2016	Sevilla	23	(4)
2016–2017	Swansea City	33	(15)
2017–2019	Tottenham Hotspur	36	(2)
2019–2021	Napoli	20	(3)
2021	Udinese	14	(1)
2021–2022	Eibar	19	(2)
Total		522	(151)

International career
2003	Spain U17	3	(2)
2005	Spain U20	4	(5)
2005–2006	Spain U21	9	(5)
2008–2013	Spain	24	(7)
2005–2007	Basque Country	5	(1)
Medal record
Representing Spain
FIFA World Cup
Winner	2010
UEFA European Championship
Winner	2012
UEFA-CAF Meridian Cup
Winner	2003
- * Club domestic league appearances and goals

Fernando Javier Llorente Torres (Spanish pronunciation: [feɾˈnando ʎoˈɾente ˈtores]; born 26 February 1985), nicknamed El Rey León ("The Lion King" in Spanish), is a Spanish former professional footballer who played as a striker.

He started his career with Athletic Bilbao, working his way through the various youth ranks and, after making his first team debut in 2005, becoming one of the most important offensive players for the club in the following decade. He scored 29 goals in all competitions in the 2011–12 season, and was described as a "Bilbao legend". He signed with Juventus in 2013, and won the Serie A title twice during his two-year spell there. Subsequently, he spent 2015–16 back in Spain with Sevilla before moving to Swansea City in 2016 and Tottenham Hotspur the following year, reaching the 2019 Champions League final with the latter. He retired aged 38, following stints at Napoli, Udinese and Eibar.

A Spain international from 2008 to 2013, Llorente was a member of the squads which won the 2010 World Cup and Euro 2012.

== Early years ==
Born in Pamplona, Llorente grew up in the municipality of Rincón de Soto in La Rioja. He joined Athletic Bilbao's youth system in 1996 at the age of 11, being eligible through his Navarrese roots.

== Club career ==
=== Athletic Bilbao ===
Llorente spent several seasons in the various junior levels of the club, playing alongside Fernando Amorebieta and moving to their farm team Basconia in Tercera División in 2003. He gradually improved, leading to promotion to Bilbao Athletic – Athletic's reserves – in the Segunda División B.

After scoring four goals for the B's in the first half of the season, Llorente was rewarded with a contract extension until June 2008. On 16 January 2005, he made his first-team and La Liga debut in a 1–1 home draw against Espanyol. Three days later, in a Copa del Rey match against Lanzarote, he scored a hat-trick in a 6–0 victory. He went on to feature in all but five of the nineteen remaining league games, scoring three goals, and also played in four domestic cup matches and the UEFA Cup round of 32 tie against Austria Wien.

Before 2005–06, Llorente exchanged his squad number of 32 for the number 9 jersey. He scored on the opening day, a Basque derby 3–0 win over Real Sociedad but, throughout the campaign, found goals hard to come by. This could be partly attributed to a series of injuries including a knee strain, gastroenteritis and a muscle injury. He ended the season with just four goals, two in the league and as many in the Cup, both against Hospitalet.

On 13 July 2006, Llorente signed a new contract until June 2011, which included a buy-out clause of between €30 and 50 million. He started the season as arguably the club's fourth-choice striker, behind Aritz Aduriz, Joseba Etxeberria and veteran Ismael Urzaiz. The team's poor form and lack of goals led to coach Félix Sarriugarte rotating the players, allowing Llorente to force his way back into the side; he ended the campaign with only two goals in 23 matches, although he did score an important one in the closing minutes of a 1–1 draw at Valencia.

In preparation for 2007–08, Llorente scored six goals in as many pre-season matches, and another against Numancia in the Caja Duero Trophy. His form led to him becoming Athletic's first-choice forward, and although he started the campaign poorly, he ended it with a total of 11 league goals as the side finished in mid-table. His tally included four goals in two games against Valencia, both impressive wins, and further strikes against Barcelona, Villarreal and Atlético Madrid.

Before 2008–09, Llorente was confident of a successful season. "I know that I am capable of scoring goals and having a good year and I want to start this term in the same form that I ended the last one in" he said. Despite the team's modest start he scored 14 league goals – a career-best – with another four in the Cup, helping his team reach the final against Barcelona (a 4–1 loss).

In the 2009–10 season, Llorente again reached double figures. He led all scorers in the Europa League for a long period with eight goals, and added fourteen in the league as Athletic eventually finished in eighth place.

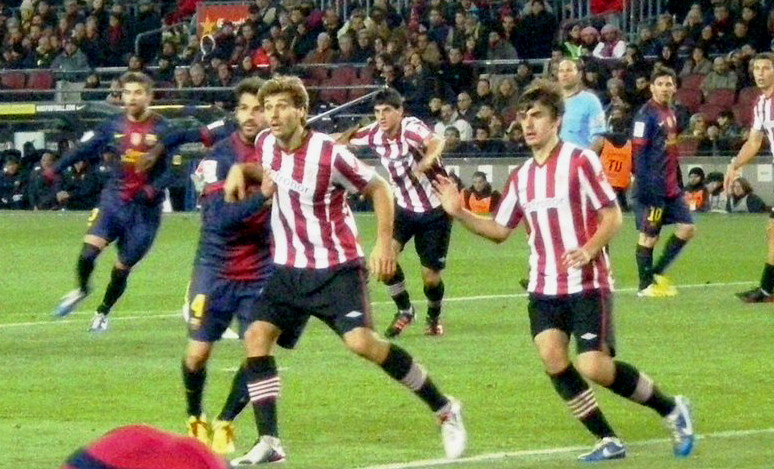
Llorente (foreground) playing for Athletic Bilbao against Barcelona in 2012

On 28 August 2010, Llorente scored the first goal of the 2010–11 campaign, in a 1–0 win at Hércules. His form continued in the next ten league fixtures as he found the net seven times, eventually finishing the season with 18 goals (19 overall) as Athletic qualified for the Europa League.

Between January and February 2012, Llorente scored five goals in two away matches in only four days: he started with a hat-trick in a 3–2 win against Rayo Vallecano, and added two in a 2–1 defeat of Mirandés in the Spanish Cup semi-finals. In the next two matches, both at home, he scored three more, one against Espanyol in the league and two against Mirandés.

Llorente scored in both legs of the 2011–12 Europa League round of 16 against Manchester United, as Athletic won both games and went through 5–3 on aggregate. In the next round he scored twice at Schalke 04 in a 4–2 win, helping the team eventually reach the final. His seven goals in the tournament also made him the club's highest scorer in European competition, beating the total of 11 set by Dani in the 1980s, later surpassed by Aduriz in 2016.

In August 2012, Llorente refused to sign a new deal with Athletic Bilbao, fuelling speculation that he might be leaving. Following a 2–0 Basque derby loss at Real Sociedad on 29 September, in which he was a late substitute, he got into an argument with manager Marcelo Bielsa; two days later he walked out of training early and was sent to practice with the youth squad and, as a result, his relationship with the club's supporters and president Josu Urrutia further deteriorated.

On 3 January 2013, Athletic confirmed that Llorente would be holding talks with Juventus. On 21 January, the latter's sporting director, Giuseppe Marotta, stated that he was "very optimistic" that the player would join on 1 July, with Urrutia believed to be unwilling to allow him to leave in the January transfer window. Three days later, the club announced he would sign a four-year deal on 1 July when his contract expired; Juventus also paid his agent €3.038 million.

Llorente scored just five goals in 36 competitive matches in his final year, playing mainly as a back-up for Aduriz.

=== Juventus ===
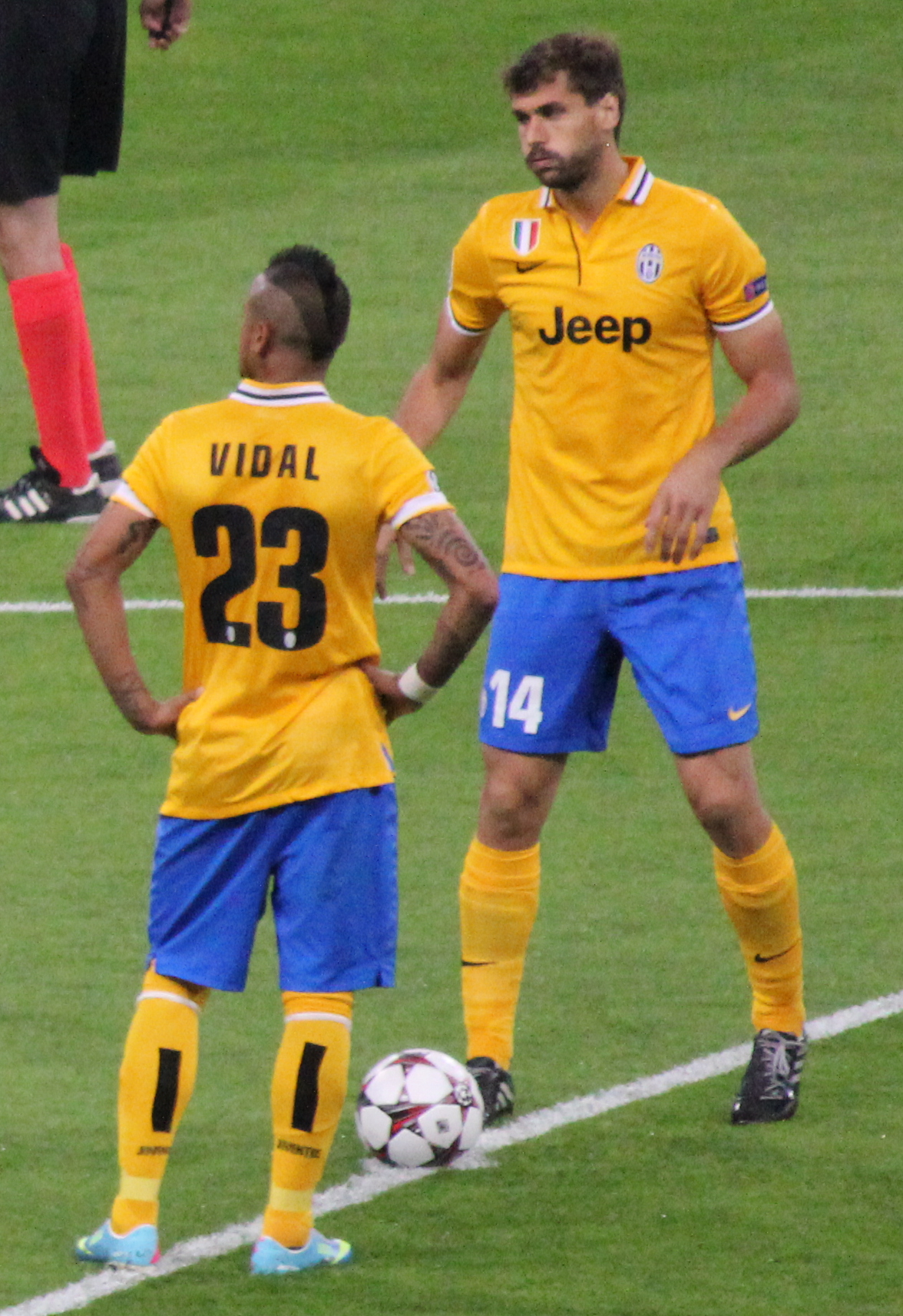
Llorente (right) before a UEFA Champions League match against Real Madrid in 2013

Llorente officially became a Juventus player on 1 July 2013 after passing a medical at the club. He was given the number 14 shirt, and scored his first goal in Serie A on 22 September when he started in a 2–1 home win against Hellas Verona.

Llorente found the net in his second and third ever appearances in the UEFA Champions League, both times against Real Madrid in the 2013–14 group stage (a 2–1 away loss, and a 2–2 home draw). In November 2013 he spoke critically about his relationship with former manager Bielsa in an exclusive interview with La Gazzetta dello Sport. On 1 December he scored in injury time, the only goal of the match at home against Udinese.

Llorente's first two goals of 2014 came on 12 January, from a header and from close range as Juventus defeated Cagliari 4–1 away to extend their winning league run to 11 matches. On 7 April, he scored both of his team's goals in a 2–0 home win over Livorno, guaranteeing at least second place and Champions League qualification. On the final day of the season, again against Cagliari, he contributed one goal as Juve won 3–0 and clinched the championship, finishing with a record 102 points.

On 6 June 2015, Llorente came off the bench and played five minutes in the final of the Champions League, lost 3–1 to Barcelona at Berlin's Olympiastadion.

=== Sevilla ===
On 27 August 2015, free agent Llorente signed a three-year contract with Sevilla with a buyout clause of €20 million. He made his league debut three days later, playing the full 90 minutes in a 3–0 home defeat against Atlético Madrid. He scored his first goal for the club in a 2–1 loss to Celta, also at the Ramón Sánchez Pizjuán Stadium, on 20 September.

On 8 November 2015, after replacing newly signed Ciro Immobile for the final 20 minutes of the league game against Real Madrid, Llorente headed home after only four minutes in an eventual 3–2 win. Exactly one month later, also at home, he scored the only goal in a 1–0 victory over his former club Juventus in the final match of the Champions League group stage, which meant Sevilla overtook Borussia Mönchengladbach into third spot and qualification for the Europa League knockout phase. The club went on to win the competition for the third time in a row, with the player being an unused substitute in the final. He came off the bench during extra time in the Copa del Rey Final four days later, which they lost to Barcelona.

=== Swansea City ===
On 4 August 2016, it was announced that Llorente had signed a two-year deal with Swansea City. He made his Premier League debut nine days later, playing the full ninety minutes in a 1–0 away win against Burnley.

On 26 November 2016, Llorente scored two injury-time goals to help the hosts defeat Crystal Palace 5–4. He also scored twice two matches later, again at the Liberty Stadium, against Sunderland (3–0). He finished his first season with 15 goals, as the team avoided relegation.

A fractured arm sustained while cycling during his summer holiday caused Llorente to miss the opening weeks of the 2017–18 campaign.

=== Tottenham Hotspur ===
On 31 August 2017, Llorente joined Tottenham Hotspur on a two-year deal for a reported fee of £12.1 million. He made his debut for the club on 13 September, replacing Harry Kane for the last minutes of a 3–1 home win over Borussia Dortmund in the Champions League group stage. He made his first start in the EFL Cup tie against Barnsley on 20 September, then played in the Champions League group stage match at Real Madrid which ended 1–1.

Llorente scored his first goal for Spurs on 6 December 2017, playing the full 90 minutes in the 3–0 Champions League win over APOEL after his team had already progressed to the knockout stage as group winners. He made his first league start the following January, scoring in a 2–0 away win against his former club Swansea.

Llorente scored a hat-trick in a 6–1 victory over Rochdale in the fifth round of the FA Cup, on 28 February 2018. On 4 January 2019, in the third round of the next season's competition, he repeated the feat in a 7–0 away rout of Tranmere Rovers, and helped the club record its biggest ever away win. His first league start of the season took place 16 days later due to an injury to Kane, when Llorente scored an own goal in a 2–1 away win at Fulham. In the following league game, he scored a late winner to help defeat Watford 2–1 at Wembley Stadium.

On 13 February 2019, Llorente scored the last goal in a 3–0 Champions League win over Borussia Dortmund, only three minutes after coming off the bench; it was his first career goal in the knockout stages of that competition, and 11th in total. On 17 April, in the same competition, he scored what turned out to be the winning goal in the quarter-final fixture against Manchester City (the tie ended 4–4, Tottenham progressing on the away goals rule). In the second leg of the semi-final away to Ajax, he replaced Victor Wanyama at half time and played a crucial role in helping his team come back from a three-goal aggregate deficit to make it 3–3 and progress again in the same fashion. In the final played in Madrid, he was introduced off the bench with eight minutes remaining and the side already behind, was unable to affect the outcome as Liverpool won 2–0 to take the trophy.

Despite his success in the Champions League, Llorente's contract expired on 30 June 2019 with no official statement from Tottenham on his position. His name was included in their 'released players' list submitted to the Premier League on 7 June 2019 (before he was actually released), and his profile was later removed from the first team squad list on the website for the upcoming season.

=== Napoli ===
On 2 September 2019, Llorente joined Napoli on a free transfer, returning to Italy four years after leaving Juventus. He made his league debut against Sampdoria on 14 September, where he provided an assist for Dries Mertens within minutes of coming on as a substitute to help the team win 2–0. His first goal for the club came three days later in the Champions League group stage game against Liverpool, scoring in injury time to seal a 2–0 victory.

Llorente continued to be used in the 'super-sub' role, as was previously the case at Tottenham; although he was rarely started, he was often brought on in the second half of matches, to cause problems for tiring opposition defences with his physical presence.

=== Udinese ===
On 27 January 2021, Llorente signed a one-and-a-half-year contract with Udinese. In August, however, he was released.

=== Eibar ===
On 27 October 2021, after three months without a club, the 36-year-old Llorente joined Eibar on a one-year deal. Once it expired, he left.

Llorente officially announced his retirement from professional football on 16 February 2023.

== International career ==
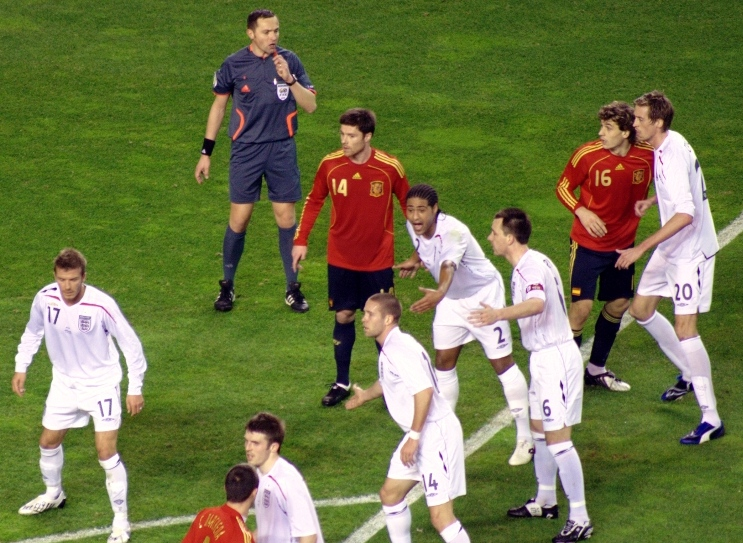
Llorente (right, number 16, marked by Peter Crouch) moments before his first goal for Spain, 11 February 2009

Llorente represented Spain at the 2005 FIFA World Youth Championship, his five goals winning him the silver boot as the competition's second highest scorer. He was also capped at under-17 and under-21 levels.

On 14 November 2008, senior national team manager Vicente del Bosque called Llorente up for a friendly against Chile; he was brought on as a substitute in the 72nd minute of the 3–0 win. He scored his first goal in the 64th minute of a 2–0 friendly win over England on 11 February 2009, after coming off the bench. After scoring 14 goals for Athletic in 2008–09, he was named by del Bosque in his 23-man squad for the 2009 FIFA Confederations Cup. He was used as a substitute against hosts South Africa, and closed a 2–0 victory.

Llorente was not selected during the 2009–10 season, as del Bosque favoured Álvaro Negredo. He was, however, selected for the 2010 FIFA World Cup in South Africa as third-choice striker, where he played in one match for the eventual champions, the last thirty minutes of the 1–0 round of 16 defeat of Portugal.

On 8 October 2010, benefiting from an injury to Fernando Torres, Llorente started in a Euro 2012 qualifier against Lithuania in Salamanca, scoring with two headers in a 3–1 win. Four days later, as a substitute, he scored the winner against Scotland in a 3–2 victory at Hampden Park. He was selected for the final stages in Poland and Ukraine, and was an unused squad member as Spain won another tournament.

Llorente was one of seven players dropped from the final squad for the 2014 World Cup. He also represented the unofficial Basque Country team five times, making his debut against Cameroon in 2005 and scoring once against Catalonia at the Camp Nou the following year. His last appearance was in December 2007.

== Style of play ==
A tall, large, and physically powerful player, Llorente's main traits were his heading ability and strength in the air, which enabled him to function effectively as a target-man in the centre of his team's attacking line. He was also known for his offensive movement, positional sense, and goalscoring ability inside the penalty area. Additionally, he was also gifted with good technical skills and link-up play, which allowed him to play well with his back to goal and hold up the ball for his teammates in order to create space and scoring opportunities.

== Career statistics ==
=== Club ===
Appearances and goals by club, season and competition
Club	Season	League			National cup (Note: Includes Copa del Rey, Coppa Italia, FA Cup)		League cup (Note: Includes EFL Cup)		Europe		Other		Total	
Club	Season	Division	Apps	Goals	Apps	Goals	Apps	Goals	Apps	Goals	Apps	Goals	Apps	Goals
Basconia	2003–04	Tercera División	33	12	—		—		—		—		33	12
Bilbao Athletic	2004–05	Segunda División B	16	4	—		—		—		—		16	4
Athletic Bilbao	2004–05	La Liga	15	3	4	3	—		1 (Note: Appearance in UEFA Cup)	0	—		20	6
Athletic Bilbao	2005–06	La Liga	22	2	3	2	—		—		—		25	4
Athletic Bilbao	2006–07	La Liga	23	2	1	0	—		—		—		24	2
Athletic Bilbao	2007–08	La Liga	35	11	5	1	—		—		—		40	12
Athletic Bilbao	2008–09	La Liga	34	14	9	4	—		—		—		43	18
Athletic Bilbao	2009–10	La Liga	37	14	2	1	—		11 (Note: Appearances in UEFA Europa League)	8	1 (Note: Appearance in Supercopa de España)	0	51	23
Athletic Bilbao	2010–11	La Liga	38	18	3	1	—		—		—		41	19
Athletic Bilbao	2011–12	La Liga	32	17	6	5	—		15	7	—		53	29
Athletic Bilbao	2012–13	La Liga	26	4	2	0	—		8	1	—		36	5
Athletic Bilbao	Total		262	85	35	17	—		35	16	1	0	333	118
Juventus	2013–14	Serie A	34	16	1	0	—		10 (Note: Five appearances and two goals in UEFA Champions League, five appearances in UEFA Europa League)	2	—		45	18
Juventus	2014–15	Serie A	31	7	4	1	—		9 (Note: Appearances in UEFA Champions League)	1	1 (Note: Appearance in Supercoppa Italiana)	0	45	9
Juventus	2015–16	Serie A	1	0	0	0	—		0	0	1	0	2	0
Juventus	Total		66	23	5	1	—		19	3	2	0	92	27
Sevilla	2015–16	La Liga	23	4	6	0	—		7 (Note: Three appearances and one goal in UEFA Champions League, four appearances and two goals in UEFA Europa League)	3	—		36	7
Swansea City	2016–17	Premier League	33	15	1	0	1	0	—		—		35	15
Tottenham Hotspur	2017–18	Premier League	16	1	6	3	2	0	7	1	—		31	5
Tottenham Hotspur	2018–19	Premier League	20	1	2	3	4	2	9	2	—		35	8
Tottenham Hotspur	Total		36	2	8	6	6	2	16	3	—		66	13
Napoli	2019–20	Serie A	17	3	1	0	—		6	1	—		24	4
Napoli	2020–21	Serie A	3	0	1	0	—		0	0	1	0	5	0
Napoli	Total		20	3	2	0	—		6	1	1	0	29	4
Udinese	2020–21	Serie A	14	1	0	0	—		—		—		14	1
Eibar	2021–22	Segunda División	19	2	2	0	—		—		1 (Note: Appearance in La Liga play-offs)	0	22	2
Career total			522	151	59	24	7	2	83	26	5	0	676	203

=== International ===
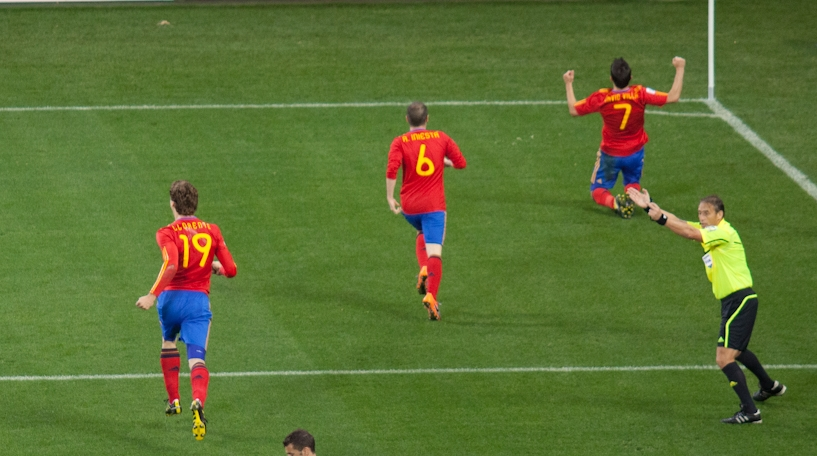
Llorente (far left) joins Andrés Iniesta and goalscorer David Villa in celebration of Spain's goal against Portugal at the 2010 FIFA World Cup

Appearances and goals by national team and year
National team	Year	Apps	Goals
Spain	2008	1	0
Spain	2009	4	2
Spain	2010	8	5
Spain	2011	6	0
Spain	2012	2	0
Spain	2013	3	0
Total		24	7

Scores and results list Spain's goal tally first, score column indicates score after each Llorente goal.

List of international goals scored by Fernando Llorente
No.	Date	Venue	Opponent	Score	Result	Competition
1	11 February 2009	Ramón Sánchez Pizjuán Stadium, Seville, Spain	England	2–0	2–0	Friendly
2	20 June 2009	Free State Stadium, Bloemfontein, South Africa	South Africa	2–0	2–0	2009 FIFA Confederations Cup
3	28 May 2010	Tivoli-Neu, Innsbruck, Austria	Saudi Arabia	3–2	3–2	Friendly
4	7 September 2010	Estadio Monumental Antonio Vespucio Liberti, Buenos Aires, Argentina	Argentina	1–3	1–4	Friendly
5	8 October 2010	Estadio El Helmántico, Villares de la Reina, Spain	Lithuania	1–0	3–1	Euro 2012 qualifying
6	8 October 2010	Estadio El Helmántico, Villares de la Reina, Spain	Lithuania	2–1	3–1	Euro 2012 qualifying
7	12 October 2010	Hampden Park, Glasgow, Scotland	Scotland	3–2	3–2	Euro 2012 qualifying

== Honours ==
Athletic Bilbao

- Copa del Rey runner-up: 2008–09, 2011–12
- UEFA Europa League runner-up: 2011–12

Juventus

- Serie A: 2013–14, 2014–15, 2015–16
- Coppa Italia: 2014–15
- Supercoppa Italiana: 2013, 2015
- UEFA Champions League runner-up: 2014–15

Sevilla

- UEFA Europa League: 2015–16

Tottenham Hotspur

- UEFA Champions League runner-up: 2018–19

Napoli

- Coppa Italia: 2019–20

Spain

- FIFA World Cup: 2010
- UEFA European Championship: 2012
- FIFA Confederations Cup third place: 2009

Individual

- FIFA U-20 World Cup Silver Shoe: 2005

Decorations

- Gold Medal of the Royal Order of Sporting Merit: 2011
