= Aritz Aduriz =

Spanish footballer (born 1981)

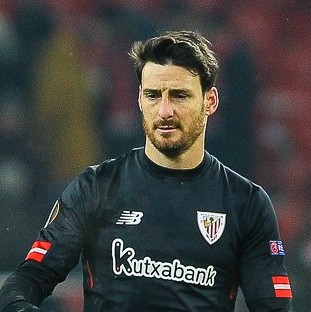
- Aduriz with Athletic Bilbao in 2018

Personal information
- Full name: Aritz Aduriz Zubeldia
- Date of birth: 11 February 1981 (age 45)
- Place of birth: San Sebastián, Spain
- Height: 1.81 m (5 ft 11 in)
- Position: Striker

Youth career
- 1994–1999: Antiguoko

Senior career*
| Years | Team | Apps | (Gls) |
| 1999–2000 | Aurrerá | 25 | (8) |
| 2000–2002 | Bilbao Athletic | 90 | (18) |
| 2002–2004 | Athletic Bilbao | 3 | (0) |
| 2003–2004 | → Burgos (loan) | 36 | (16) |
| 2004–2005 | Valladolid | 46 | (20) |
| 2006–2008 | Athletic Bilbao | 82 | (22) |
| 2008–2010 | Mallorca | 69 | (23) |
| 2010–2012 | Valencia | 58 | (17) |
| 2012–2020 | Athletic Bilbao | 231 | (96) |
| Total | | 640 | (221) |

International career
| 2010–2017 | Spain | 13 | (2) |
| 2006–2019 | Basque Country | 13 | (12) |
- * Club domestic league appearances and goals

Aritz Aduriz Zubeldia (Basque: [aɾits̻ aðuɾis̻]; Spanish: [ˈaɾits aˈðuɾiθ]; born 11 February 1981) is a Spanish former professional footballer who played as a striker.

He spent most of his career with Athletic Bilbao, scoring 172 goals across all competitions for the team over three spells. He also surpassed a century of goals (104) in La Liga, in which he additionally represented Mallorca and Valencia.

In addition to playing for Spain, Aduriz was a regular goalscorer for the Basque national side. He appeared for the former at Euro 2016, at the age of 35.

== Early life ==
Born in San Sebastián, Gipuzkoa, Aduriz came from a family keen on sport but more inclined towards the likes of surfing, mountaineering and cross-country skiing. He excelled at the latter as a child, finishing runner-up in the junior national championship.

== Club career ==
=== Athletic Bilbao ===
Learning to play football on the sand at La Concha beach, he was brought through the ranks of local youth club Antiguoko where he shared teams with future elite players Xabi Alonso, Mikel Arteta and Andoni Iraola, but was not initially picked up by a professional club like his teammates. He became part of the famed Lezama youth system at Athletic Bilbao, although he was already 19 when he arrived from amateurs Aurrerá de Vitoria.

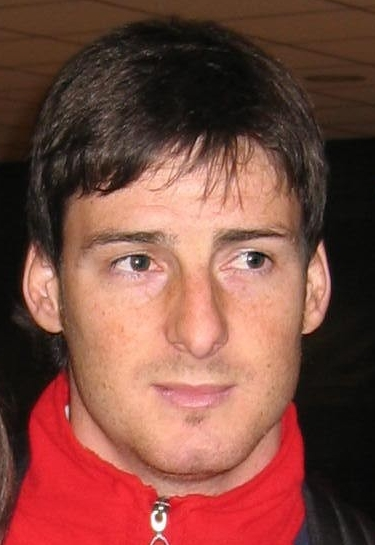
Aduriz in 2008

After two seasons in the reserves, Aduriz made his first-team debut on 14 September 2002 against Barcelona in a 0–2 home loss, but made only two more league appearances during the campaign, still turning out for the B-side where he made just short of 100 appearances in the Segunda División B. He went on to spend almost three seasons elsewhere (one with Burgos, one and a half at Real Valladolid in the Segunda División) before returning to Athletic in December 2005.

Aduriz showed continuous progress, attested by his nine La Liga goals in 34 games in 2006–07, including a hat-trick against Real Zaragoza on 19 May 2007, albeit in a 3–4 defeat. He was overshadowed by the younger Fernando Llorente in the following campaign, but still managed to net seven times in 33 league appearances.

=== Mallorca ===
On 4 August 2008, Aduriz became the first player to score at the Colchester Community Stadium, in a friendly match with Colchester United. He was sold to Mallorca on the 23rd, signing a four-year contract.

On 26 October 2008, Aduriz scored a brace for his new club in a 3–0 home victory over Espanyol, and finished his first year as team top scorer, for a final ninth position. He repeated the individual feat in 2009–10 – improving to 12– as the Balearic Islands side ranked fifth, with qualification for the UEFA Europa League.

=== Valencia ===
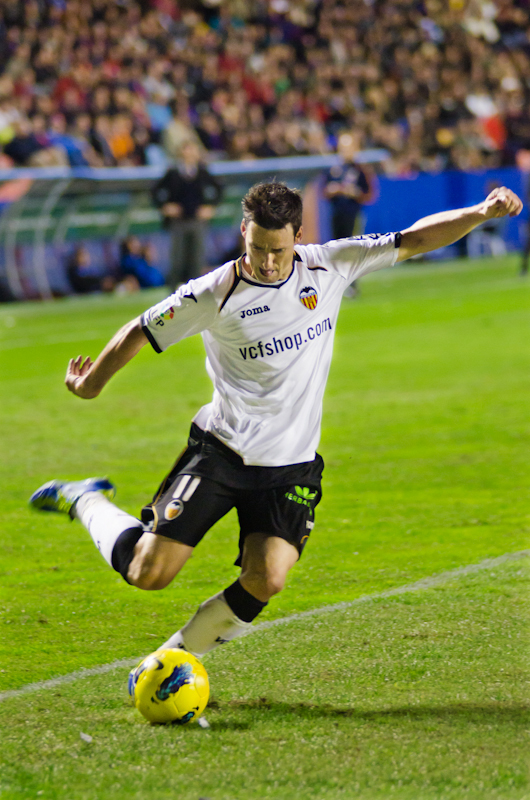
Aduriz in action for Valencia in 2011

Aged 29, Aduriz moved to Valencia on 14 July 2010, for about €4 million. He scored on his official debut on 28 August, opening an eventual 3–1 win at Málaga.

From January 2011, after the arrival of Brazilian Jonas in the winter transfer window, and due to the fact manager Unai Emery often only played with one pure striker – Roberto Soldado – Aduriz found himself on the bench more often than not. He still managed to finish his first season as a Che with 14 competitive goals, including two in their campaign in the UEFA Champions League, one in each of the games against Bursaspor.

=== Return to Athletic ===
==== 2012–2016 ====
On 27 June 2012, Aduriz rejoined first professional club Athletic Bilbao for a fee in the region of €2.5 million, signing for three years. On 23 August, he scored his first goals in his second spell, netting a brace in a 6–0 home rout of HJK Helsinki in the Europa League playoff round (9–3 on aggregate). On 20 October, he returned to the Mestalla Stadium to face his previous team and netted twice, albeit in a 3–2 loss.

Aduriz continued with his form on 4 November 2012, scoring two goals in a 2–1 away win over Granada. He quickly profited from Llorente's shaky contractual situation to become first-choice, and finished his first season in his second spell with 18 official goals, 14 in the league.

Llorente left for Juventus in summer 2013, and Aduriz was made the starter by new manager Ernesto Valverde. On 28 February of the following year, he scored three of his team's goals to help the hosts beat Granada 4–0.

On 8 February 2015, Aduriz scored in a 2–5 home loss to Barcelona to complete a century of goals in Spain's top flight. In the last match of the campaign on 23 May, he netted twice in a 4–0 home victory against Villarreal to clinch the Zarra Trophy by surpassing Rayo Vallecano's Alberto Bueno, whilst also qualifying for the Europa League. In the 24th minute, he ceded a penalty kick to Iraola who was leaving the club after 16 years, but his teammate declined, so he converted it instead.

Aduriz scored a hat-trick as Athletic won 4–0 against Barcelona in the first leg of the Supercopa de España, on 14 August 2015, and equalised in a 1–1 draw in the return match to hand his team the trophy, the first of his career. On 16 October, after starting the season strongly with 11 goals in 14 matches in all competitions, the 34-year-old agreed to a contract extension until 2017.

Aduriz again proved influential for his team on 5 November, scoring one goal and assisting a further two in a 5–1 defeat of Partizan in the Europa League group stage – in the process, he reached the 100-goal mark with the club. On 24 January 2016, he netted through a bicycle kick to help his team come back from a 1–0 deficit to win 5–2 over neighbouring Eibar. On 18 February, in the Europa League's round-of-32 tie at Marseille, he scored what was described as a "wonderful" and "incredible" goal, the only one at the Stade Vélodrome.

Aduriz was the La Liga Player of the Month for March 2016 after scoring three goals, becoming the first Athletic player to win the award since its introduction in 2013. In that month, he also struck to eliminate former side Valencia from the last 16 in Europe. Even though the team was eliminated in the following round by eventual winners Sevilla, he finished as the competition's top scorer with ten successful strikes, totalling 36 overall and only trailing Telmo Zarra (47) and Bata (37) for goals during a single season with the club.

==== 2016–2020, retirement ====
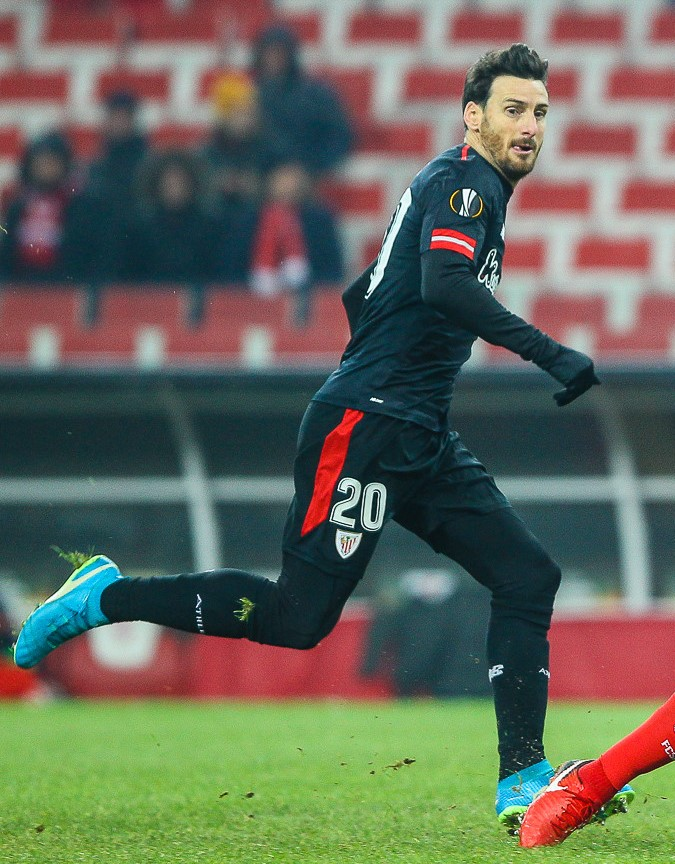
Aduriz playing with Athletic in the 2017–18 Europa League

On 3 November 2016, in a Europa League group stage home fixture to Genk, Aduriz scored all five of his team's goals (including three penalties) in a 5–3 victory, becoming the first player to accomplish this feat in the competition in the process. Having previously been level with Llorente on 16, that achievement also took him clear as the club's top scorer in European matches.

Aduriz renewed his contract with Athletic once more in November 2017, this time to run until summer 2019. The following month, he became the club's oldest goalscorer after surpassing Agustín Gaínza.

Aduriz was named the league's Player of the Month for the second time, winning the January 2018 award after showing good sportsmanship during a derby against Eibar: he fell in the penalty area going for a loose ball between two defenders, but immediately signalled to the referee and the supporters that no foul should be awarded (he also scored a few minutes earlier, one of two strikes during the month).

Despite the club being eliminated from the 2017–18 Europa League at the last-16 stage, 37-year-old Aduriz finished as the competition's top scorer – along with Lazio's Ciro Immobile – with eight goals in the tournament proper. His 2018–19 campaign was severely curtailed by injuries as the team generally struggled to score and collect points, and he scored only two league goals from 20 appearances; both were penalties in successive home fixtures, the first in a Panenka-style against Girona past former teammate Gorka Iraizoz for a last-minute 1–0 victory, and the second against Valladolid an unusual precise kick with no run-up, described as a "remarkable... five-a-side... minimalist" technique. He agreed a new one-year contract in May 2019, later confirming at the outset of 2019–20 that it would be his last season as a player before retiring.

On 16 August 2019, Aduriz scored the only goal in a 1–0 victory against Barcelona through a bicycle kick in the last minute of the first league fixture, helping his side to their first league win against that opposition since 2013 and also equalling Lionel Messi's record of scoring in 15 consecutive league seasons. He had a stoppage-time penalty saved in a match away to previous employers Mallorca four weeks later, and injuries then caused him to miss three months of matches over that winter. He returned to play a role from the bench in wins over Barcelona and Granada in February that helped the team qualify for the 2020 Copa del Rey final, but did not score again himself before the season was suspended due to the COVID-19 pandemic– his last appearance being as a last-minute substitute in a win over another former club, Valladolid.

On 20 May 2020, Aduriz announced his retirement as a professional footballer.

== International career ==
=== Spain ===
After an impressive start to his Valencia career, 29-year-old Aduriz earned a first call-up to the Spain national team, being picked for two UEFA Euro 2012 qualifiers in October 2010. He made his debut on the 8th, replacing Llorente for the last 15 minutes of a 3–1 home win against Lithuania.

Six years later, at the age of 35, Aduriz was recalled by manager Vicente del Bosque for friendlies with Italy and Romania. He started and scored in the first match, a 1–1 draw at the Stadio Friuli, and was selected for UEFA Euro 2016 in France. He made two substitute appearances in the group stage, always replacing Juventus' Álvaro Morata in the second half. On 27 June, in the round-of-16 clash against Italy at the Stade de France, he came out for Nolito at the start of the second half, but had to leave the pitch injured in an eventual 0–2 loss.

On 12 November 2016, after contributing to a 4–0 victory over Macedonia in the 2018 World Cup qualifying phase in Granada, Aduriz became Spain's oldest ever goal scorer at the age of 35 years and 275 days.

=== Basque Country ===
Aduriz made his debut for the Basque representative team on 8 October 2006, opening a 2–2 draw at the Camp Nou against Catalonia. He also scored braces in victories over FIFA members Estonia, Bolivia and Peru.

As of 2017, Aduriz had 12 goals in friendly matches for the Basque team, making him their record goalscorer.

== Style of play ==
Aduriz was known for his aerial ability and first touch.

== Career statistics ==
=== Club ===
Appearances and goals by club, season and competition
| Club | Season | League | | | Copa del Rey | | Europe | | Other | | Total | |
| Club | Season | Division | Apps | Goals | Apps | Goals | Apps | Goals | Apps | Goals | Apps | Goals |
|---|---|---|---|---|---|---|---|---|---|---|---|---|
| Aurrerá | 1999–2000 | Segunda División B | 25 | 8 | – | | – | | – | | 25 | 8 |
| Bilbao Athletic | 2000–01 | Segunda División B | 33 | 7 | – | | – | | – | | 33 | 7 |
| Bilbao Athletic | 2001–02 | Segunda División B | 35 | 8 | – | | – | | – | | 35 | 8 |
| Bilbao Athletic | 2002–03 | Segunda División B | 22 | 4 (Note: Athletic Bilbao profile attributes one of the four goals to Isaac Cortés) | – | | – | | 6 (Note: 2003 Segunda División B play-offs) | 1 | 28 | 5 |
| Bilbao Athletic | Total | | 90 | 19 | 0 | 0 | 0 | 0 | 6 | 1 | 96 | 20 |
| Athletic Bilbao | 2002–03 | La Liga | 3 | 0 | 1 | 0 | – | | – | | 4 | 0 |
| Burgos | 2003–04 | Segunda División B | 36 | 16 | 2 | 0 | – | | – | | 38 | 16 |
| Valladolid | 2004–05 | Segunda División | 32 | 14 | 6 | 2 | – | | – | | 38 | 16 |
| Valladolid | 2005–06 | Segunda División | 14 | 6 | 0 | 0 | – | | – | | 14 | 6 |
| Valladolid | Total | | 46 | 20 | 6 | 2 | 0 | 0 | 0 | 0 | 52 | 22 |
| Athletic Bilbao | 2005–06 | La Liga | 15 | 6 | 2 | 0 | – | | – | | 17 | 6 |
| Athletic Bilbao | 2006–07 | La Liga | 34 | 9 | 1 | 0 | – | | – | | 35 | 9 |
| Athletic Bilbao | 2007–08 | La Liga | 33 | 7 | 5 | 1 | – | | – | | 38 | 8 |
| Athletic Bilbao | Total | | 82 | 22 | 8 | 1 | 0 | 0 | 0 | 0 | 90 | 23 |
| Mallorca | 2008–09 | La Liga | 35 | 11 | 5 | 0 | – | | – | | 40 | 11 |
| Mallorca | 2009–10 | La Liga | 34 | 12 | 4 | 1 | – | | – | | 38 | 13 |
| Mallorca | Total | | 69 | 23 | 9 | 1 | 0 | 0 | 0 | 0 | 78 | 24 |
| Valencia | 2010–11 | La Liga | 29 | 10 | 2 | 2 | 8 (Note: Appearances in UEFA Champions League) | 2 | – | | 39 | 14 |
| Valencia | 2011–12 | La Liga | 29 | 7 | 6 | 1 | 10 (Note: Four appearances and one goal in UEFA Champions League, six appearances in UEFA Europa League) | 1 | – | | 45 | 9 |
| Valencia | Total | | 58 | 17 | 8 | 3 | 18 | 3 | 0 | 0 | 84 | 23 |
| Athletic Bilbao | 2012–13 | La Liga | 36 | 14 | 2 | 1 | 6 (Note: Appearances in UEFA Europa League) | 3 | – | | 44 | 18 |
| Athletic Bilbao | 2013–14 | La Liga | 31 | 16 | 5 | 2 | – | | – | | 36 | 18 |
| Athletic Bilbao | 2014–15 | La Liga | 31 | 18 | 9 | 5 | 8 (Note: Seven appearances and three goals in UEFA Champions League, one appearance in UEFA Europa League) | 3 | – | | 48 | 26 |
| Athletic Bilbao | 2015–16 | La Liga | 34 | 20 | 5 | 2 | 14 | 10 | 2 (Note: Appearances in Supercopa de España) | 4 | 55 | 36 |
| Athletic Bilbao | 2016–17 | La Liga | 32 | 16 | 4 | 1 | 6 | 7 | – | | 42 | 24 |
| Athletic Bilbao | 2017–18 | La Liga | 33 | 9 | 1 | 0 | 14 | 11 | – | | 48 | 20 |
| Athletic Bilbao | 2018–19 | La Liga | 20 | 2 | 3 | 4 | – | | – | | 23 | 6 |
| Athletic Bilbao | 2019–20 | La Liga | 14 | 1 | 3 | 0 | – | | – | | 17 | 1 |
| Athletic Bilbao | Total | | 231 | 96 | 32 | 15 | 48 | 34 | 2 | 4 | 313 | 149 |
| Career total | | | 640 | 221 | 66 | 22 | 66 | 37 | 8 | 5 | 780 | 285 |

=== International ===
Appearances and goals by national team and year
| National team | Year | Apps | Goals |
|---|---|---|---|
| Spain | 2010 | 1 | 0 |
| Spain | 2011 | 0 | 0 |
| Spain | 2012 | 0 | 0 |
| Spain | 2013 | 0 | 0 |
| Spain | 2014 | 0 | 0 |
| Spain | 2015 | 0 | 0 |
| Spain | 2016 | 10 | 2 |
| Spain | 2017 | 2 | 0 |
| Total | | 13 | 2 |

Scores and results list Spain's goal tally first, score column indicates score after each Aduriz goal.

List of international goals scored by Aritz Aduriz
| No. | Date | Venue | Opponent | Score | Result | Competition |
|---|---|---|---|---|---|---|
| 1 | 24 March 2016 | Stadio Friuli, Udine, Italy | Italy | 1–1 | 1–1 | Friendly |
| 2 | 12 November 2016 | Estadio Nuevo Los Cármenes, Granada, Spain | North Macedonia | 4–0 | 4–0 | 2018 FIFA World Cup qualification |

== Honours ==
Athletic Bilbao

- Supercopa de España: 2015
- Copa del Rey runner-up: 2014–15

Individual

- Zarra Trophy: 2014–15, 2015–16
- UEFA Europa League Top Scorer: 2015–16, 2017–18 (joint)
- UEFA Europa League Squad of the Season: 2015–16
- La Liga Player of the Month: March 2016, January 2018

== See also ==
- List of Athletic Bilbao players (+200 appearances)
- List of footballers with 400 or more La Liga appearances
