= Asier del Horno =

Spanish footballer

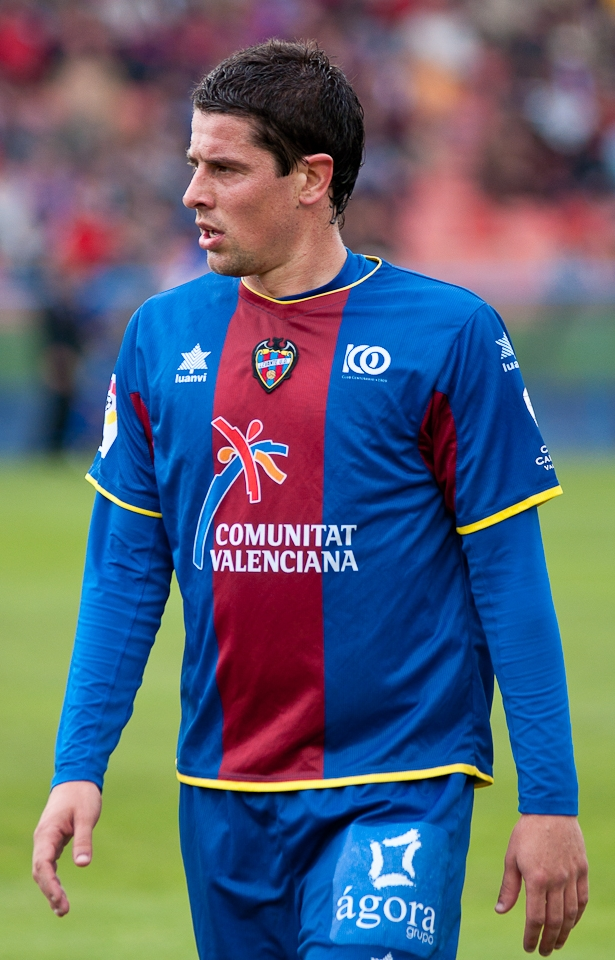
- Del Horno with Levante in 2011

Personal information
- Full name: Asier del Horno Cosgaya
- Date of birth: 19 January 1981 (age 45)
- Place of birth: Gallarta, Spain
- Height: 1.83 m (6 ft 0 in)
- Position: Left-back

Youth career
- 1992–1993: Gallarta
- 1993–1999: Athletic Bilbao

Senior career*
Years	Team	Apps	(Gls)
1999–2000	Bilbao Athletic	26	(1)
2000–2005	Athletic Bilbao	108	(13)
2005–2006	Chelsea	25	(1)
2006–2011	Valencia	15	(0)
2007–2008	→ Athletic Bilbao (loan)	16	(0)
2010	→ Valladolid (loan)	13	(0)
2010–2011	→ Levante (loan)	22	(2)
2011–2012	Levante	13	(0)
Total		238	(17)

International career
1999–2000	Spain U18	14	(2)
2000–2003	Spain U21	16	(1)
2004–2005	Spain	10	(2)
2003–2007	Basque Country	4	(0)
- * Club domestic league appearances and goals

Asier del Horno Cosgaya (born 19 January 1981) is a Spanish former professional footballer who played as a left-back.

After solid displays with Athletic Bilbao, for which he appeared in 126 competitive games in five years scoring 17 goals, he moved to Chelsea in England, where he won the Premier League in the 2005–06 season.

Subsequently, del Horno – who missed the 2006 World Cup with Spain due to a last-minute injury – returned to his country with Valencia, who loaned him to several clubs for the duration of his contract. He dealt with several physical problems in the latter part of his career, amassing La Liga totals of 187 matches and 15 goals.

== Club career ==
=== Athletic Bilbao ===
Born in Gallarta, Biscay, del Horno began his career at Athletic Bilbao in 1999, where his combative tackling and strength in the air saw him rise through the ranks as a left-footed central defender. However, his pace and ability to contribute to the attack led to him being switched to the flank.

Del Horno made his first-team debut in the 2000–01 opener at the age of 19, and finished his first season at the San Mamés Stadium with 14 La Liga games to help the Basques finish in 12th position.

=== Chelsea ===
In June 2005, del Horno moved to Chelsea for a fee of £8 million. He won the only league championship of his career with the Blues, as part of the squad that claimed the Premier League title.

During his spell at Stamford Bridge, del Horno played 34 official matches and scored once, against Tottenham Hotspur at White Hart Lane in a 2–0 victory on 27 August 2005. The following 22 February, late into the first half of a UEFA Champions League round-of-16 clash at home against FC Barcelona, he received a straight red card for a foul on Lionel Messi, as his team went on to lose the match 2–1 and the tie 3–2.

=== Valencia ===
On 21 July 2006, del Horno returned to Spain to sign for Valencia CF on a six-year contract worth €8 million, seen as a natural replacement for Amedeo Carboni who had retired at 41. Following surgery on his injured Achilles heel, which kept him off the pitches for most of the season, he made his debut for his new team on 3 March 2007 in a 1–0 home win over RC Celta de Vigo.

Del Horno was placed on the transfer list by manager Quique Sánchez Flores, as the latter announced that the defender would not retain his position for 2007–08. In the last day of the transfer window, he agreed to join his former club Athletic on a one-year loan deal, returning to Valencia after an injury-filled campaign. His physical problems persisted and, after an unassuming first half of 2009–10 – only played in the Copa del Rey and only when facing rivals of smaller entity – he was loaned to Real Valladolid until the end of the season, on 30 January; an undisputed starter since his arrival, he could not however prevent the Castile and León side from returning to Segunda División after a three-year stay.

For 2010–11, 29-year-old del Horno was loaned once again, joining recently promoted side Levante UD. He was used regularly in both defensive positions as the Valencians eventually retained their league status, but also missed the final stretch due to physical ailments which had been bothering him since early into the campaign.

=== Later career ===
Upon returning to Valencia, del Horno's contract was immediately terminated. In early August 2011, he re-joined Levante on a permanent deal.

After again dealing with injury throughout the season, where he was not able to dislodge 35-year-old Juanfran from the left-back position, del Horno was released.

== International career ==
Del Horno made his Spain debut on 3 September 2004, against Scotland. Two months later, he scored the winner in a 1–0 friendly with England played in Madrid.

An ankle injury forced del Horno to withdraw from the 23-man squad named by Luis Aragonés for the 2006 FIFA World Cup in Germany. Medical staff in the Royal Spanish Football Federation alleged that Chelsea had prior knowledge of the former's injury, but allowed him to continue playing; subsequently, his vacant position was controversially filled in by naturalised Argentinian Mariano Pernía, of Getafe CF.

Del Horno also represented the Basque Country regional team.

== Career statistics ==
=== Club ===
Appearances and goals by club, season and competition
Club	Season	League			National Cup		League Cup		Europe		Other		Total	
Club	Season	Division	Apps	Goals	Apps	Goals	Apps	Goals	Apps	Goals	Apps	Goals	Apps	Goals
Bilbao Athletic	1999–2000	Segunda División B	26	1	—		—		—		—		26	1
Athletic Bilbao	2000–01	La Liga	14	0	1	0	—		—		—		15	0
Athletic Bilbao	2001–02	La Liga	10	1	2	0	—		—		—		12	1
Athletic Bilbao	2002–03	La Liga	24	4	1	0	—		—		—		25	4
Athletic Bilbao	2003–04	La Liga	31	5	0	0	—		—		—		31	5
Athletic Bilbao	2004–05	La Liga	29	3	6	1	—		8 (Note: Appearances in UEFA Cup)	3	—		43	7
Athletic Bilbao	Total		108	13	10	1	—		8	3	—		126	17
Chelsea	2005–06	Premier League	25	1	4	0	0	0	4 (Note: Appearances in UEFA Champions League)	0	1 (Note: Appearance in FA Community Shield)	0	34	1
Valencia	2006–07	La Liga	6	0	0	0	—		2	0	—		8	0
Valencia	2008–09	La Liga	9	0	4	0	—		8	2	—		21	2
Valencia	2009–10	La Liga	0	0	2	0	—		1 (Note: Appearance in UEFA Europa League)	0	—		3	0
Valencia	Total		15	0	6	0	—		11	2	—		32	2
Athletic Bilbao (loan)	2007–08	La Liga	16	0	5	1	—		—		—		21	1
Real Valladolid (loan)	2009–10	La Liga	13	0	0	0	—		—		—		13	0
Levante (loan)	2010–11	La Liga	22	2	2	0	—		—		—		24	2
Levante	2011–12	La Liga	13	0	2	0	—		—		—		15	0
Career total			238	17	29	4	0	0	23	5	1	0	291	24

=== International goals ===
Scores and results list Spain's goal tally first, score column indicates score after each Del Horno goal.

#	Date	Venue	Opponent	Score	Result	Competition
1.	17 November 2004	Santiago Bernabéu, Madrid, Spain	England	1–0	1–0	Friendly
2.	9 February 2005	Mediterráneo, Almería, Spain	San Marino	5–0	5–0	2006 World Cup qualification

== Honours ==
Chelsea

- Premier League: 2005–06
- FA Community Shield: 2005
