= Dani Aranzubia =

Spanish footballer (born 1979)

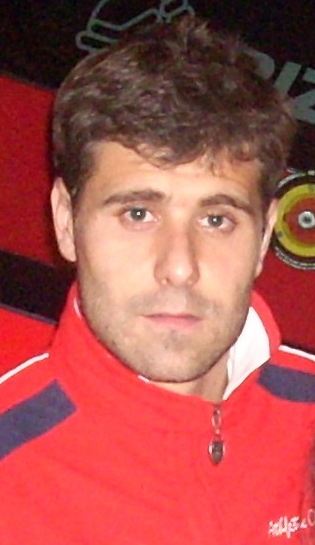
- Aranzubia in 2008

Personal information
- Full name: Daniel Aranzubia Aguado
- Date of birth: 18 September 1979 (age 47)
- Place of birth: Logroño, Spain
- Height: 1.86 m (6 ft 1 in)
- Position: Goalkeeper

Team information
- Current team: Amorebieta (goalkeeper coach)

Youth career
- 1993–1994: Loyola
- 1994–1997: Athletic Bilbao

Senior career*
Years	Team	Apps	(Gls)
1996–2000	Athletic Bilbao B	70	(0)
1997–1998	Basconia	31	(0)
2000–2008	Athletic Bilbao	162	(0)
2008–2013	Deportivo La Coruña	178	(1)
2013–2014	Atlético Madrid	1	(0)
Total		442	(1)

International career
1995–1996	Spain U16	3	(0)
1998–1999	Spain U20	9	(0)
1999–2001	Spain U21	17	(0)
2000	Spain U23	6	(0)
2004	Spain	1	(0)
Medal record
Representing Spain
Men's Football
Silver medal – second place	2000 Sydney	Team competition
FIFA World Youth Championship
Winner	1999 Nigeria
- * Club domestic league appearances and goals

Daniel Aranzubia Aguado (born 18 September 1979) is a Spanish former professional footballer who played as a goalkeeper. He is the current goalkeeper coach of Amorebieta.

He appeared in 303 La Liga matches over 13 seasons, with Athletic Bilbao – in whose youth system he grew – Deportivo and Atlético Madrid. With the second club, he scored one goal in the competition.

Aranzubia represented Spain at Euro 2004.

== Club career ==
=== Athletic Bilbao ===
Born in Logroño, La Rioja, but nonetheless a product of Athletic Bilbao's famed youth academy at Lezama, Aranzubia made his La Liga debut with the first team on 10 June 2001 in a 1–3 home derby loss against Real Sociedad. After two seasons as backup to Iñaki Lafuente, he emerged as the side's undisputed starter, helping them qualify for the UEFA Cup in 2004 while extending his contract a further four years.

Following additional struggles for first-choice duties with Lafuente in the 2005–06 campaign, Aranzubia was definitely deemed surplus to requirements by the Basques due to the emergence of Gorka Iraizoz, not appearing even when the first-choice was severely injured during 2007–08 (Athletic received veteran Armando on loan from Cádiz CF, and he became the starter).

=== Deportivo ===
On 13 July 2008, Aranzubia joined Deportivo de La Coruña on a three-year deal, helping the Galicians to the UEFA Intertoto Cup and starting throughout the entire season, save one match due to suspension. On 2 October, he saved three penalties in a shootout against SK Brann in a UEFA Cup first round 2–0 home win, with Depor thus reaching the group stage.

Aranzubia missed the first six games of the 2010–11 campaign due to injury, but again finished as a starter. On 20 February 2011, he scored with his head through a 95th-minute corner kick as his team managed a 1–1 draw at UD Almería, becoming the first goalkeeper in the history of the Spanish top division to score from open play.

=== Atlético Madrid ===
In August 2013, Aranzubia signed for Atlético Madrid as a backup to Thibaut Courtois. He made his debut in the UEFA Champions League on 11 December 2013 shortly after his 34th birthday, saving a penalty from FC Porto's Josué in a 2–0 group stage home victory.

As the Belgian was unavailable due to injury, Aranzubia first played in the league with the Colchoneros on 8 February 2014, being sent off in the last minutes of a 2–0 loss at Almería after fouling Jonathan Zongo in the box. He finished his spell at the Vicente Calderón Stadium with five competitive appearances.

== International career ==
Aranzubia made his only appearance for Spain on 5 June 2004, in a friendly with Andorra at the Coliseum Alfonso Pérez. He came on as a substitute for Santiago Cañizares, who had already replaced Iker Casillas, at the hour-mark, after having been selected as third-choice for the UEFA Euro 2004 tournament.

Previously, Aranzubia helped the nation to win the 1999 FIFA World Youth Championship and finish runners-up at the 2000 Summer Olympics, starting in both finals.

== Coaching career ==
On 21 June 2016, Aranzubia was hired as a goalkeeper coach for SD Amorebieta under manager Aitor Larrazábal. Three years later, in the same capacity, he joined his former teammate Joseba Etxeberria's staff at Athletic Bilbao B.

Aranzubia returned to Amorebieta in summer 2023, in the same role.

== Career statistics ==
Appearances and goals by club, season and competition
Club	Season	League			Cup		Europe		Total	
Club	Season	Division	Apps	Goals	Apps	Goals	Apps	Goals	Apps	Goals
Athletic Bilbao B	1996–97	Segunda División B	5	0	—		—		5	0
Athletic Bilbao B	1998–99	Segunda División B	33	0	—		—		33	0
Athletic Bilbao B	1999–2000	Segunda División B	32	0	—		—		32	0
Athletic Bilbao B	Total		70	0	—		—		70	0
Basconia	1997–98	Tercera División	31	0	—		—		31	0
Athletic Bilbao	1999–2000	La Liga	0	0	0	0	—		0	0
Athletic Bilbao	2000–01	La Liga	2	0	4	0	—		6	0
Athletic Bilbao	2001–02	La Liga	8	0	8	0	—		16	0
Athletic Bilbao	2002–03	La Liga	25	0	2	0	—		27	0
Athletic Bilbao	2003–04	La Liga	34	0	0	0	—		34	0
Athletic Bilbao	2004–05	La Liga	37	0	1	0	4 (Note: Appearance(s) in UEFA Cup)	0	42	0
Athletic Bilbao	2005–06	La Liga	18	0	2	0	0	0	20	0
Athletic Bilbao	2006–07	La Liga	28	0	0	0	—		28	0
Athletic Bilbao	2007–08	La Liga	10	0	6	0	—		16	0
Athletic Bilbao	Total		162	0	23	0	4	0	189	0
Deportivo La Coruña	2008–09	La Liga	37	0	0	0	10	0	47	0
Deportivo La Coruña	2009–10	La Liga	36	0	0	0	—		36	0
Deportivo La Coruña	2010–11	La Liga	32	1	0	0	—		32	1
Deportivo La Coruña	2011–12	Segunda División	38	0	0	0	—		38	0
Deportivo La Coruña	2012–13	La Liga	35	0	0	0	—		35	0
Deportivo La Coruña	Total		178	1	0	0	10	0	188	1
Atlético Madrid	2013–14	La Liga	1	0	3	0	1 (Note: Appearance(s) in UEFA Champions League)	0	5	0
Career total			442	1	26	0	15	0	483	1

== Honours ==
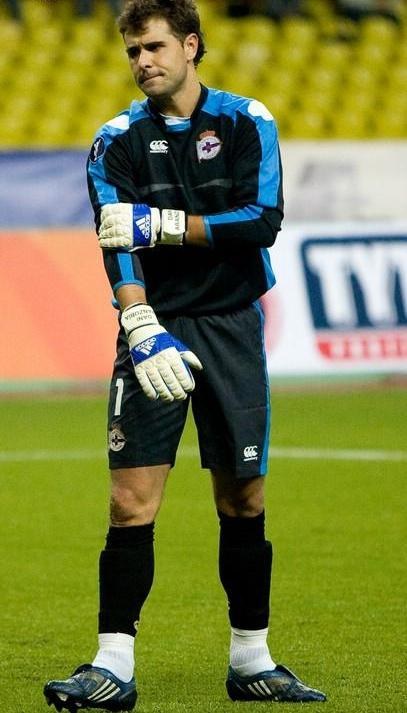
Aranzubia with Deportivo in 2008

Basconia

- Tercera División: 1997–98

Deportivo

- Segunda División: 2011–12

Atlético Madrid

- La Liga: 2013–14
- UEFA Champions League runner-up: 2013–14

Spain U20

- FIFA World Youth Championship: 1999

Spain U23

- Summer Olympics silver medal: 2000
