= Jon Moya =

Spanish footballer

Personal information
- Full name: Jon Moya Martín
- Date of birth: 5 January 1983 (age 43)
- Place of birth: Barakaldo, Spain
- Height: 1.86 m (6 ft 1 in)
- Position: Centre back

Team information
- Current team: Portugalete

Youth career
- 1995–2001: Athletic Bilbao

Senior career*
Years	Team	Apps	(Gls)
2001–2002	Basconia	35	(2)
2002–2008	Bilbao Athletic	100	(2)
2005–2007	Athletic Bilbao	2	(0)
2005	→ Eibar (loan)	4	(0)
2006	→ Terassa (loan)	9	(0)
2006–2007	→ Barakaldo (loan)	34	(2)
2008–2010	Lleida	59	(6)
2010–2012	Alavés	52	(1)
2012–2014	Logroñés	57	(3)
2014–	Portugalete	82	(3)

International career
2000	Spain U16	1	(0)
2001	Spain U17	4	(0)
2001–2002	Spain U19	2	(0)
- * Club domestic league appearances and goals as of 27 January 2019

Jon Moya Martín (born 5 January 1983 in Barakaldo, Biscay) is a Spanish former footballer who played for Club Portugalete as a central defender.
