= Andoni Iraola =

Spanish football manager (born 1982)

- Iraola with Liverpool in 2026

Personal information
- Full name: Andoni Iraola Sagarna
- Date of birth: 22 June 1982 (age 44)
- Place of birth: Usurbil, Spain
- Height: 1.81 m (5 ft 11 in)
- Position: Right-back

Team information
- Current team: Liverpool (head coach)

Youth career
- 1991–1999: Antiguoko
- 1999–2000: Athletic Bilbao

Senior career*
Years	Team	Apps	(Gls)
2000–2001	Basconia	35	(4)
2001–2003	Bilbao Athletic	75	(15)
2003–2015	Athletic Bilbao	406	(33)
2015–2016	New York City FC	38	(0)
Total		554	(52)

International career
2001	Spain U18	1	(0)
2003	Spain U21	1	(0)
2008–2011	Spain	7	(0)
2003–2013	Basque Country	9	(0)

Managerial career
- 2018–2019: AEK Larnaca
- 2019–2020: Mirandés
- 2020–2023: Rayo Vallecano
- 2023–2026: Bournemouth
- 2026–: Liverpool
- * Club domestic league appearances and goals

Andoni Iraola Sagarna (Basque: [andoni iɾa.ola s̺aɣarna], Spanish: [anˈdoni iɾaˈola saˈɣaɾna]; born 22 June 1982) is a Spanish professional football manager and former player who is the head coach of Premier League club Liverpool.

Utilised primarily as a right-back through his career, he was highly combative and possessed good passing skills. He spent the vast majority of his professional career with Athletic Bilbao, appearing in 510 competitive matches over 12 seasons.

Iraola began managing in 2018, winning the Cypriot Super Cup with AEK Larnaca. He then joined Segunda División club Mirandés before departing for Rayo Vallecano where he spent three seasons and won promotion to the top tier in his first. In 2023, he was appointed at Premier League side Bournemouth, guiding the team to the highest league finish in their history in 2025–26 with a first-ever qualification for European football. In 2026, he signed for Liverpool.

== Club career ==
=== Athletic Bilbao ===
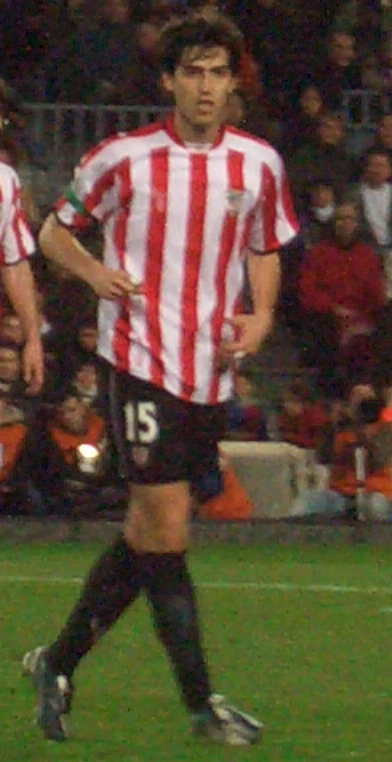
Iraola playing for Athletic Bilbao in 2007

Iraola was born in Usurbil, Gipuzkoa, in the Basque Country. He played as a youth for Antiguoko, alongside teammates such as Mikel Arteta, Xabi Alonso, Mikel Alonso and Aritz Aduriz. A product of Athletic Bilbao's youth system at Lezama, he made his debut with the first team in the 2003–04 season, becoming first-choice while often taking penalties and free kicks. On 30 August 2003, he made his first La Liga appearance, starting in a 1–0 home loss against Barcelona, and his five goals in 30 appearances helped the team to qualify for the UEFA Cup.

During his 12 seasons, Iraola never played fewer than 30 league matches, scoring in all but one league campaign – like former club legend Aitor Larrazábal, who played as a left-back– while also helping the Basque side to finish second in three Copa del Rey tournaments and the 2011–12 UEFA Europa League. On 28 January 2007, he netted twice in a 2–0 away win over neighbours Real Sociedad, who were finally relegated; Athletic narrowly avoided the drop, ranking in 17th position. He played his first cup final in 2009, a 4–1 loss to Barcelona at the Mestalla Stadium in Valencia, and three years later helped them to finish runners-up in both the domestic cup and the Europa League.

2012–13 marked the first year where Iraola failed to find the net in the league, but he continued to be the side's first-choice in his position as he featured in 35 games. His only goal of the season came on 24 August 2012 in a 6–0 home rout of HJK in the Europa League playoff round (9–3 on aggregate).

Iraola renewed his contract with the club on 4 December 2013, keeping him at the San Mamés until 30 June 2015. In the 24th minute of his last league appearance against Villarreal in May 2015, Aritz Aduriz offered him the taking of a penalty kick but he declined, so the former converted it instead; the two players then combined for Iraola to score from open play four minutes later. He captained the team in his last match, the 2015 Copa del Rey final which was lost 3–1 to Barcelona.

=== New York City FC ===
On 16 June 2015, aged 33, Iraola moved abroad for the first time in his career, signing for Major League Soccer club New York City FC. He made his debut against Toronto FC at Yankee Stadium on 12 July, playing the entirety of a 4–4 draw.

Iraola announced his retirement on 17 November 2016.

== International career ==
On 20 August 2008, Iraola was called by new Spain coach Vicente del Bosque for a friendly with Denmark, alongside teammate Fernando Amorebieta. He entered the pitch in the final 15 minutes of the 3–0 away victory, coming in as a substitute for Sergio Ramos.

On 29 March 2011, after nearly one and a half years without playing for the national team, Iraola started in a 3–1 defeat of Lithuania in Kaunas for the UEFA Euro 2012 qualifiers. He was due to make the cut for the final squad, but an injury forced him out in favour of Atlético Madrid's Juanfran.

Iraola played on the Basque representative side for a full decade, having debuted late on in a 2–1 win over Uruguay on 27 December 2003.

== Coaching career ==
=== AEK Larnaca ===
Iraola was appointed manager of Cypriot club AEK Larnaca on 18 June 2018, succeeding his compatriot Imanol Idiakez. He was sacked the following 14 January, after nearly two months without winning a single match.

=== Mirandés ===
On 10 July 2019, Iraola replaced the departed Borja Jiménez at the helm of Mirandés, newly promoted to Segunda División. He took the team to the semi-finals of the Spanish Cup for the second time in their 92-year history, notably disposing of top-tier sides Celta, Sevilla and Villarreal. On 21 July 2020, he left the club as his contract expired.

=== Rayo Vallecano ===
Iraola remained in the second division in August 2020, taking over from Paco Jémez at Rayo Vallecano. On 6 July 2021, after achieving promotion in the playoffs, he extended his contract until 2022. The following season, he again led a club to the last four of the national cup; it was the second time Rayo had achieved this, the first occasion coming 40 years earlier.

In February 2023, Iraola was approached by Leeds United of the Premier League, but was not given permission to leave the Campo de Fútbol de Vallecas. He left at the end of the campaign, having turned down a renewal offer.

=== Bournemouth ===
On 19 June 2023, Iraola was appointed manager of Bournemouth on a two-year deal. His first match in charge was a 1–1 home draw with West Ham United on 12 August, in which Dominic Solanke scored a late equaliser. He achieved his first win in the tenth league round, beating Burnley 2–1 with goals from Antoine Semenyo and Philip Billing.

Iraola extended his contract with the club on 13 May 2024, until 2026; his Cherries team had just finished the season with a best-ever 48 points, in 12th place. On 2 November, he oversaw a 2–1 win over Manchester City, ending their 32-game unbeaten run in the domestic league.

Iraola as Bournemouth manager in 2026

On 11 April 2026, Iraola achieved a 2–1 away defeat of leaders Arsenal. Three days later, he confirmed he would be leaving Bournemouth at the end of the campaign; he led them on an 18-match unbeaten streak, securing qualification for the Europa League for the first time in their history with a final sixth position.

=== Liverpool ===
On 4 June 2026, Iraola signed as head coach of Liverpool on a two-year contract; he replaced Arne Slot in the role, who had been dismissed on 30 May. His first match in charge was on 23 August, a 2–2 draw at Newcastle United where Dominik Szoboszlai salvaged a point through a late penalty. He achieved his first win at the third attempt on 4 September, beating Ipswich Town 2–0 with goals from Alexander Isak. Five days later, in his first ever UEFA Champions League game as a manager, his team defeated Atlético Madrid 2–1 at Anfield in the league phase.

== Manager profile ==
=== Tactics ===
Iraola established himself as a prominent proponent of high-intensity, proactive football. His tactical identity was defined by a commitment to disruption and rapid verticality. He predominantly utilized a 4–3–3/4–2–3–1 formation with a focus on quick ball recoveries. With quick wingers, tireless midfield runners and a defensive midfielder who tends to drop deep when building from the back when the full-backs push forward, his main emphasis was on catching the opposition off guard; this aggressive positioning was designed to overwhelm the opposition's defensive structure through sheer volume and speed, rather than the intricate numerical overloads typical of tiki-taka.

Iraola's tactical foundation was primarily forged during his tenure as a player under Marcelo Bielsa and Ernesto Valverde at Athletic Bilbao. From the latter, the former adopted a philosophy centered on extreme physical output, man-oriented pressing, and a relentless desire to attack. His teams were characterised by a "hybrid" press; they often maintained a zonal press before "jumping" into aggressive man-to-man press once a specific passing trigger was met.

Unlike traditional possession-based systems, Iraola prioritized verticality over horizontal ball retention. His teams sought to progress the ball to the final third as quickly as possible, often using direct long balls from the goalkeeper to bypass opposition pressure.

The goal was not necessarily to maintain a clean sequence of passes, but to create "chaos" scenarios where his players could win second balls in advanced positions. This led to a high-tempo, "up-and-down" style of play—often likened to basketball transitions—where the team intentionally stretched the pitch to punish opponents slow to react to turnovers.

=== Reception ===
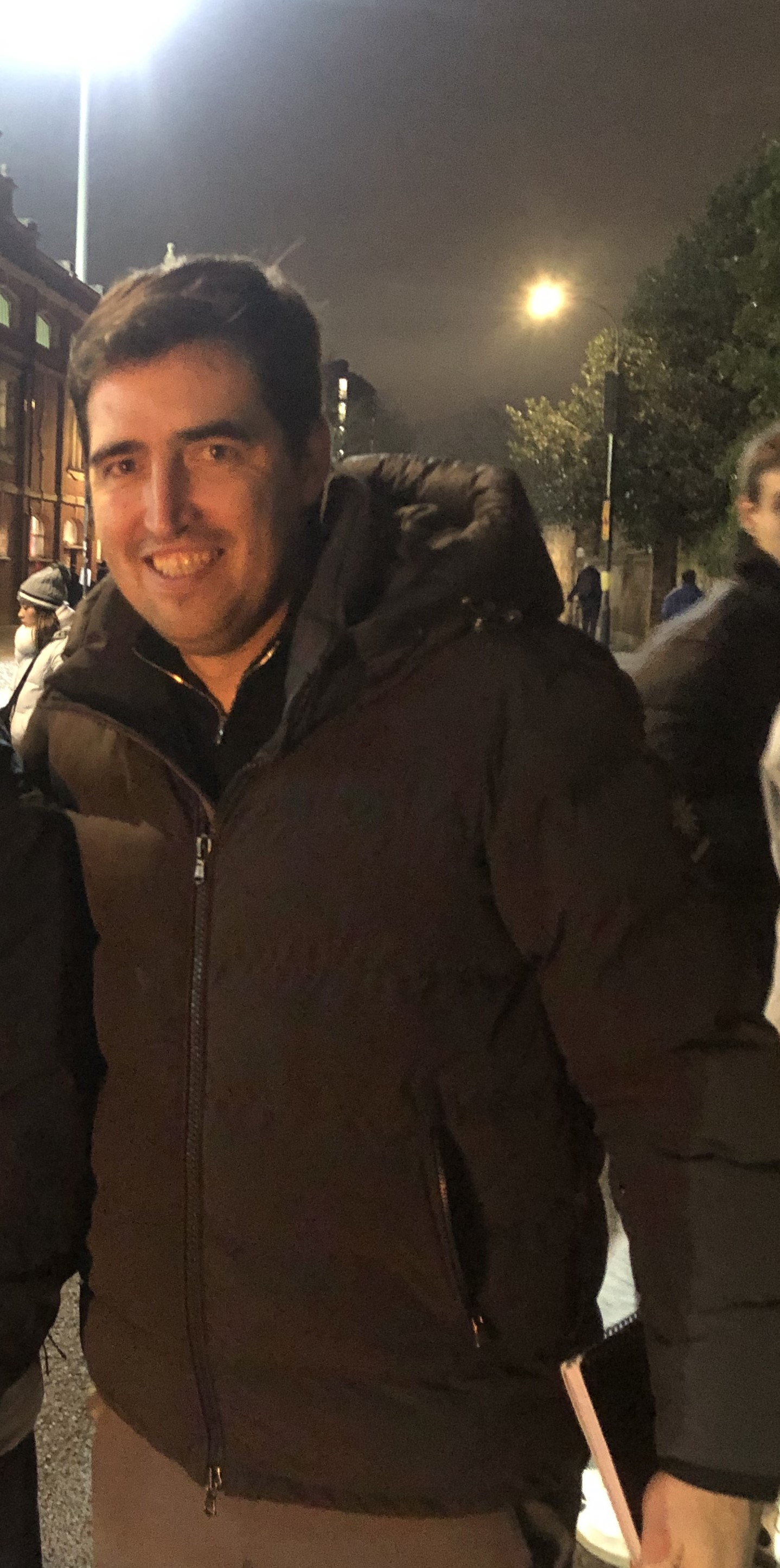
Iraola in 2024

Despite his more direct approach, Iraola was frequently compared to Pep Guardiola due to their shared proactive DNA and common lineage under Bielsa. Pundits and analysts noted that both managers demanded a high defensive line and utilized the Gegenpressing (counter-pressing) philosophy to win the ball back immediately after loss.

Guardiola himself praised Iraola's intelligence and the "alive" nature of his teams, noting that both managers shared an obsession with tactical detail and physical data to overwhelm opponents. However, while Guardiola sought to minimise risk through total control of the ball, Iraola's system was distinguished by its willingness to embrace high-risk scenarios and defensive trade-offs to maintain an unrelenting attacking momentum.

== Personal life ==
Iraola is married to Itziar, and has two children, a daughter and a son.

== Career statistics ==
=== Club ===
Appearances and goals by club, season and competition
Club	Season	League			National cup (Note: Includes Copa del Rey)		Continental		Other		Total	
Club	Season	Division	Apps	Goals	Apps	Goals	Apps	Goals	Apps	Goals	Apps	Goals
Basconia	2000–01	Tercera División	35	4	–		–		–		35	4
Bilbao Athletic	2001–02	Segunda División	38	5	–		–		–		38	5
Bilbao Athletic	2002–03	Segunda División	37	10	–		–		–		37	10
Bilbao Athletic	Total		75	15	–		–		–		75	15
Athletic Bilbao	2003–04	La Liga	30	5	1	0	–		–		31	5
Athletic Bilbao	2004–05	La Liga	34	4	7	1	8 (Note: Appearances in UEFA Cup)	1	–		49	6
Athletic Bilbao	2005–06	La Liga	38	3	4	0	–		–		42	3
Athletic Bilbao	2006–07	La Liga	35	5	2	0	–		–		37	5
Athletic Bilbao	2007–08	La Liga	36	1	5	1	–		–		41	2
Athletic Bilbao	2008–09	La Liga	33	6	8	0	–		–		41	6
Athletic Bilbao	2009–10	La Liga	37	2	2	0	11 (Note: Appearances in UEFA Europa League)	0	2 (Note: Appearances in Supercopa de España)	0	52	2
Athletic Bilbao	2010–11	La Liga	37	4	4	0	–		–		41	4
Athletic Bilbao	2011–12	La Liga	35	1	9	0	15	0	–		59	1
Athletic Bilbao	2012–13	La Liga	35	0	1	0	7	1	–		43	1
Athletic Bilbao	2013–14	La Liga	34	1	6	0	0	0	–		40	1
Athletic Bilbao	2014–15	La Liga	22	1	6	0	5	1	–		33	2
Athletic Bilbao	Total		406	33	56	2	46	3	2	0	510	38
New York City FC	2015	Major League Soccer	9	0	0	0	–		–		9	0
New York City FC	2016	Major League Soccer	29	0	0	0	–		2 (Note: Appearances in MLS Cup playoffs)	0	31	0
New York City FC	Total		38	0	0	0	–		2	0	40	0
Career total			554	52	56	2	46	3	4	0	660	57

=== International ===
Appearances and goals by national team and year
National team	Year	Apps	Goals
Spain	2008	2	0
Spain	2009	2	0
Spain	2011	3	0
Total		7	0

== Managerial statistics ==
As of match played 22 November 2026

Managerial record by team and tenure
Team	From	To	Record					Ref.
Team	From	To	G	W	D	L	Win %	Ref.
AEK Larnaca	23 May 2018	14 January 2019	29	12	9	8	41.38	
Mirandés	10 July 2019	21 July 2020	49	18	17	14	36.73	
Rayo Vallecano	6 August 2020	19 June 2023	136	54	32	50	39.71	
Bournemouth	19 June 2023	24 May 2026	127	47	40	40	37.01	
Liverpool	4 June 2026	Present	17	10	4	3	58.82	
Career Total			358	141	102	115	39.39	

== Honours ==
=== Player ===
Athletic Bilbao

- Copa del Rey runner-up: 2008–09, 2011–12, 2014–15
- Supercopa de España runner-up: 2009
- UEFA Europa League runner-up: 2011–12

=== Manager ===
AEK Larnaca

- Cypriot Super Cup: 2018

Individual

- Premier League Manager of the Month: March 2024, January 2025

== See also ==
- List of Athletic Bilbao players (200+ appearances)
- List of La Liga players (400+ appearances)
