= Asier Ormazábal =

Spanish footballer

Personal information
- Full name: Asier Ormazábal Larizgoitia
- Date of birth: 21 October 1982 (age 44)
- Place of birth: Bilbao, Spain
- Height: 1.80 m (5 ft 11 in)
- Position: Right back

Youth career
- Santutxu
- 1995–2001: Athletic Bilbao

Senior career*
Years	Team	Apps	(Gls)
2001–2002	Basconia	36	(0)
2002–2006	Bilbao Athletic	90	(0)
2006–2007	Pontevedra	38	(0)
2007–2008	Cartagena	28	(0)
2008–2009	Pontevedra	35	(0)
2009–2011	Puertollano	63	(2)
2011–2014	Logroñés	82	(0)
2014–2015	Leioa	31	(1)
2015–2018	Santutxu	35	(0)
- * Club domestic league appearances and goals

Asier Ormazábal Larizgoitia (born 21 October 1982) is a Spanish former footballer who played as a right back.

== Club career ==
Born in Bilbao, Biscay, Ormazábal finished his graduation with Athletic Bilbao's youth setup, Lezama, and made his senior debuts with the farm team in the 2001–02 season, in Tercera División. One year later he was promoted to the reserves in Segunda División B and, on 2 July 2005, made his official debut with the main side, starting in a 0–1 away loss to CFR Cluj for the UEFA Intertoto Cup.

In January 2006 Ormazábal rescinded his link with Athletic, and went on to resume his career in the third level, representing Pontevedra CF (two stints), FC Cartagena, CD Puertollano, UD Logroñés and SD Leioa.
