= Joseba Garmendia =

Spanish footballer (born 1985)

Personal information
- Full name: Joseba Garmendia Elorriaga
- Date of birth: 4 October 1985 (age 41)
- Place of birth: Basauri, Spain
- Height: 1.82 m (6 ft 0 in)
- Position: Midfielder

Youth career
- 1995–1996: Colegio Etxegaray
- 1996–2003: Athletic Bilbao

Senior career*
Years	Team	Apps	(Gls)
2003–2004	Basconia	36	(9)
2004–2006	Bilbao Athletic	42	(14)
2006–2009	Athletic Bilbao	45	(3)
2009–2011	Numancia	45	(7)
2011–2013	Girona	21	(0)
2014	Mirandés	15	(2)
2014–2015	Murcia	21	(2)
2015–2016	Amorebieta	8	(2)
2016	Socuéllamos	16	(0)
2017	Palencia	14	(0)
2017–2018	Formentera	34	(0)
2019–2022	Formentera	103	(9)
Total		400	(48)
- * Club domestic league appearances and goals

Joseba Garmendia Elorriaga (born 4 October 1985) is a Spanish former professional footballer who played as a midfielder.

== Club career ==
Garmendia was born in Basauri, Biscay. A product of Athletic Bilbao's famed youth system, he made his first-team debut in 2006–07's first matchday, a 1–1 local derby against Real Sociedad.

During his three-season spell with the Basques, Garmendia never appeared in more than 18 La Liga matches, totalling 51 overall. He scored his first goal in the competition on 10 December 2006, helping to a 4–2 home win over Recreativo de Huelva.

In late July 2009, Garmendia bought out the remaining year of his contract and moved to Segunda División club CD Numancia in a 2+1 deal; his former Athletic teammate Iñigo Vélez also made the move. He continued competing at that level the following years, with Girona FC and CD Mirandés, suffering an anterior cruciate ligament injury whilst at the service of the former that sidelined him for several months.

On 1 September 2014, Garmendia joined Real Murcia CF, recently relegated to the Segunda División B. He continued playing in the lower leagues until his retirement, which was confirmed in May 2022 at the age of 36.
