= Endika Bordas =

Spanish former professional footballer

Personal information
- Full name: Endika Bordas Losada
- Date of birth: 8 March 1982 (age 44)
- Place of birth: Bermeo, Spain
- Height: 1.78 m (5 ft 10 in)
- Position: Midfielder

Youth career
- 1994–1995: Bermeo
- 1995–2000: Athletic Bilbao

Senior career*
Years	Team	Apps	(Gls)
2000	Basconia	15	(0)
2001–2003	Bilbao Athletic	66	(0)
2003–2006	Athletic Bilbao	14	(0)
2005	→ Terrassa (loan)	12	(0)
2006	Hospitalet	18	(0)
2007–2009	Córdoba	56	(2)
2009–2012	Salamanca	45	(0)
2012–2013	Bermeo	12	(3)
2013	Locomotive Tbilisi	12	(2)
2013–2015	Amorebieta	25	(0)
2015–2017	Gernika	20	(0)
Total		295	(7)

International career
2001	Spain U18	7	(0)
2002	Spain U20	3	(0)

Managerial career
- 2017–2018: Gernika (assistant)
- 2018–2019: Arenas Getxo (assistant)
- 2019: Arenas Getxo
- * Club domestic league appearances and goals

Endika Bordas Losada (born 8 March 1982 in Bermeo, Biscay) is a Spanish former professional footballer who played as a midfielder, currently a manager.

== Managerial statistics ==
As of 19 May 2019

Managerial record by team and tenure
Team	Nat	From	To	Record								Ref
Team	Nat	From	To	G	W	D	L	GF	GA	GD	Win %	Ref
Arenas Getxo	(Spain)	2 April 2019	13 June 2019	7	2	3	2	10	9	+1	28.57	
Total				7	2	3	2	10	9	+1	28.57	—
