= Felipe Guréndez =

Spanish footballer

Personal information
- Full name: Felipe Guréndez Aldanondo
- Date of birth: 18 November 1975 (age 50)
- Place of birth: Vitoria, Spain
- Height: 1.74 m (5 ft 8 1/2 in)
- Position: Midfielder

Youth career
- 1991–1994: Athletic Bilbao

Senior career*
Years	Team	Apps	(Gls)
1994–1997	Athletic Bilbao B	42	(0)
1996–2006	Athletic Bilbao	138	(3)
1997–1998	→ Osasuna (loan)	25	(0)
2006–2010	Numancia	67	(1)
Total		272	(4)

International career
1996–1998	Spain U21	12	(1)
1997	Spain U23	3	(0)
- * Club domestic league appearances and goals

Felipe Guréndez Aldanondo (born 18 November 1975 in Vitoria, Spain), sometimes known as just Felipe, is a Spanish retired professional footballer. Mainly a defensive midfielder, he could also play as a defensive-minded right back.

He appeared in 146 La Liga games over the course of 11 seasons (three goals), almost exclusively for Athletic Bilbao.

== Club career ==
Born in Vitoria-Gasteiz, Álava, Felipe was a product of Athletic Bilbao's prolific youth system. He made his debut for the first team on 3 January 1996 in a 1–0 home win against Real Zaragoza where he came on as a 46th-minute substitute for Bolo, but was never more than a backup during his nine full La Liga seasons, his best outputs coming from 1998 to 2001; incidentally, as the Basques finished second in 1997–98, he was on loan to Navarrese neighbours CA Osasuna of the second division.

In the summer of 2006, after only 13 matches in his final four years combined, Felipe was released by the Lions and left for CD Numancia also in the second level, contributing relatively in the 2007–08 campaign as the Soria club returned to the top flight after three years of absence. In June 2010, having just totalled 24 league appearances in his last two seasons, the 34-year-old was released and retired shortly after.

== Honours ==
=== Club ===
Numancia

- Segunda División: 2007–08

=== International ===
Spain U21

- UEFA European Under-21 Championship: 1998
