= Tiko (footballer) =

Spanish footballer (born 1976)

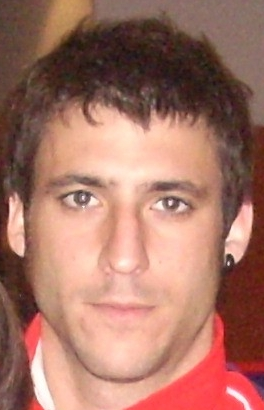
- Tiko in 2008

Personal information
- Full name: Roberto Martínez Rípodas
- Date of birth: 15 September 1976 (age 50)
- Place of birth: Pamplona, Spain
- Height: 1.78 m (5 ft 10 in)
- Position: Midfielder

Youth career
- Osasuna

Senior career*
Years	Team	Apps	(Gls)
1995–1997	Osasuna B	62	(7)
1997–1999	Osasuna	38	(7)
1999–2009	Athletic Bilbao	198	(21)
2008–2009	→ Eibar (loan)	16	(0)
Total		314	(35)

International career
2002	Spain	1	(0)
2003–2006	Basque Country	3	(0)

Managerial career
- 2017–2019: Basconia (assistant)
- * Club domestic league appearances and goals

Roberto Martínez Rípodas (born 15 September 1976), known as Tiko, is a Spanish former professional footballer who played as a central or a defensive midfielder.

He was known for his powerful shots and creative play, his long-range efforts being dubbed Tikotazo. He represented mainly Athletic Bilbao in a 14-year senior career, appearing in 230 competitive games for his main club over nine La Liga seasons and scoring 26 goals.

Tiko appeared once for the Spain national team.

== Club career ==
Born in Pamplona, Navarre, Tiko was a product of the youth system at his hometown club CA Osasuna, alternating between the main squad and the reserves for some time, with the former competing in the Segunda División. His professional debut came on 10 May 1997, as he scored an injury time-winner away against CD Badajoz (1–0).

In August 1999, Tiko joined neighbours Athletic Bilbao (initially on loan, after the two clubs agreed to a top-level 'test' period for him in exchange for delaying the move of Pablo Orbaiz), making his La Liga debut on 12 October 1999 in a 4–3 away victory over Málaga CF. Signed permanently in December, he made 20 appearances in all competitions during the campaign, netting once.

Tiko was an undisputed starter for the Basques from 2001 to 2006, often scoring from free kicks and dictating his team's play. In his final two seasons he was severely hampered by injuries and the emergence of Carlos Gurpegui and Javi Martínez, playing only seven league matches during this timeframe.

In August 2008, deemed surplus to requirements, Tiko joined second-tier side SD Eibar on a one-year loan deal. He was immediately released upon his return to Athletic following the former's relegation, and retired shortly after at the age of 33.

Subsequently, Tiko embarked on a coaching career. In 2015, he joined the staff of Athletic's reserves under his former Osasuna teammate José Ángel Ziganda; in 2017, he became assistant manager of CD Basconia (the former's farm team), working with Ander Alaña.

== International career ==
Tiko topped a successful 2001–02 season – 32 games, seven goals– with his sole cap for Spain, playing in a friendly with the Netherlands on 27 March 2002 as the nation lost 1–0 in Rotterdam.

== Personal life ==
Tiko's younger brother, Francisco, was also a footballer and a midfielder. He played exclusively in the lower leagues, representing Osasuna B as well.

Tiko's uncle Patxi was also involved in the sport, also being a midfielder and also beginning his career at Osasuna before moving to Athletic Bilbao.
