= Ander Murillo =

Spanish footballer

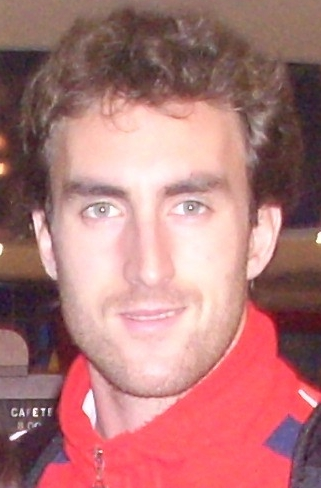
- Murillo as an Athletic Bilbao player (2008)

Personal information
- Full name: Ander Murillo García
- Date of birth: 22 July 1983 (age 43)
- Place of birth: San Sebastián, Spain
- Height: 1.82 m (6 ft 0 in)
- Position: Defender

Team information
- Current team: Bilbao Athletic (assistant)

Youth career
- 1992–1999: Antiguoko
- 1999–2001: Athletic Bilbao

Senior career*
Years	Team	Apps	(Gls)
2001–2002	Bilbao Athletic	14	(0)
2001–2010	Athletic Bilbao	132	(1)
2009–2010	→ Salamanca (loan)	37	(0)
2010–2011	Celta	23	(0)
2011–2018	AEK Larnaca	145	(3)
Total		351	(4)

International career
2001	Spain U17	2	(0)
2001–2002	Spain U19	7	(2)
2003	Spain U20	2	(0)
2003–2005	Spain U21	11	(0)
2006	Basque Country	1	(0)

Managerial career
- 2018–2019: AEK Larnaca (assistant)
- 2020–2021: ASIL Lysi (assistant)
- 2021: ASIL Lysi (caretaker)
- 2022–2023: Leganés (assistant)
- 2023–: Bilbao Athletic (assistant)
- * Club domestic league appearances and goals

Ander Murillo García (born 22 July 1983) is a Spanish former professional footballer who played as a defender. He is the current assistant manager of Athletic Bilbao B.

He spent most of his career with Athletic Bilbao and AEK Larnaca, appearing in 157 competitive matches with the former over nine seasons and 184 for the latter in seven.

== Club career ==
=== Athletic Bilbao ===
Murillo was born in San Sebastián, Gipuzkoa. A product of Athletic Bilbao's prolific youth system, he made his debut for their first team on 24 November 2001, in a 2–1 away win against FC Barcelona; he played a further 18 La Liga games the following season, after breaking his leg during preseason.

From 2004 to 2007, Murillo would be an important defensive element for the Lions, being deployed as a right-back or in the middle, but he suffered greatly with injuries subsequently. On 21 December 2008, after nearly a year without competitive appearances, he started in the 1–0 away victory over Real Betis only to leave the pitch before half-time injured.

On 11 August 2009, after only two matches during the 2008–09 campaign, Murillo moved to Segunda División side UD Salamanca in a season-long move. In late August 2010 he terminated his Athletic contract and left the club after 11 years, signing with RC Celta de Vigo also of the second tier.

=== AEK Larnaca ===
Having joined in the summer of 2011 at the age of 28, Murillo went on to play several years with AEK Larnaca FC in the Cypriot First Division, as part of a large contingent of Spanish players and managers at the side. He helped the club finish second in the league table for three consecutive seasons between 2015 and 2017, their highest-ever placings; his final professional match was the 2018 Cypriot Cup final which was won 2–1 against Apollon Limassol FC (the scorer of the winning goal being another Spanish veteran, Acorán), to collect their first silverware since lifting the same trophy in 2004.

In June 2018, Murillo retired and was named AEK's director of football as longtime Athletic Bilbao teammate Andoni Iraola signed as manager.

== Personal life ==
Murillo's father Luciano and his uncle Eliseo were also footballers and defenders who played for Real Sociedad, having moved to San Sebastián at a young age from Extremadura.

== Career statistics ==
Appearances and goals by club, season and competition
Club	Season	League			Cup		Other		Total	
Club	Season	Division	Apps	Goals	Apps	Goals	Apps	Goals	Apps	Goals
Bilbao Athletic	2001–02	Segunda División B	14	0	—		—		14	0
Athletic Bilbao	2001–02	La Liga	11	0	6	0	—		17	0
Athletic Bilbao	2002–03	La Liga	18	0	0	0	—		18	0
Athletic Bilbao	2003–04	La Liga	4	0	1	0	—		5	0
Athletic Bilbao	2004–05	La Liga	31	0	5	0	7 (Note: Appearances in UEFA Cup)	0	43	0
Athletic Bilbao	2005–06	La Liga	26	0	3	0	—		29	0
Athletic Bilbao	2006–07	La Liga	34	1	2	0	—		36	1
Athletic Bilbao	2007–08	La Liga	6	0	1	0	—		7	0
Athletic Bilbao	2008–09	La Liga	2	0	0	0	—		2	0
Athletic Bilbao	Total		132	1	18	0	7	0	157	1
Salamanca (loan)	2009–10	Segunda División	37	0	3	0	—		40	0
Celta	2010–11	Segunda División	23	0	1	0	—		24	0
AEK Larnaca	2011–12	Cypriot First Division	24	0	6	0	5 (Note: Appearances in UEFA Europa League)	0	35	0
AEK Larnaca	2012–13	Cypriot First Division	23	0	3	0	—		26	0
AEK Larnaca	2013–14	Cypriot First Division	29	0	4	0	—		33	0
AEK Larnaca	2014–15	Cypriot First Division	25	1	5	0	—		30	1
AEK Larnaca	2015–16	Cypriot First Division	7	0	3	0	—		10	0
AEK Larnaca	2016–17	Cypriot First Division	20	2	1	0	6	0	27	0
AEK Larnaca	2017–18	Cypriot First Division	17	0	3	0	3	0	23	0
AEK Larnaca	Total		145	3	25	0	14	0	184	3
Career total			351	4	47	0	21	0	419	4

== Honours ==
AEK Larnaca

- Cypriot Cup: 2017–18

Spain U19

- UEFA European Under-19 Championship: 2002
