= Pablo Orbaiz =

Spanish footballer (born 1979)

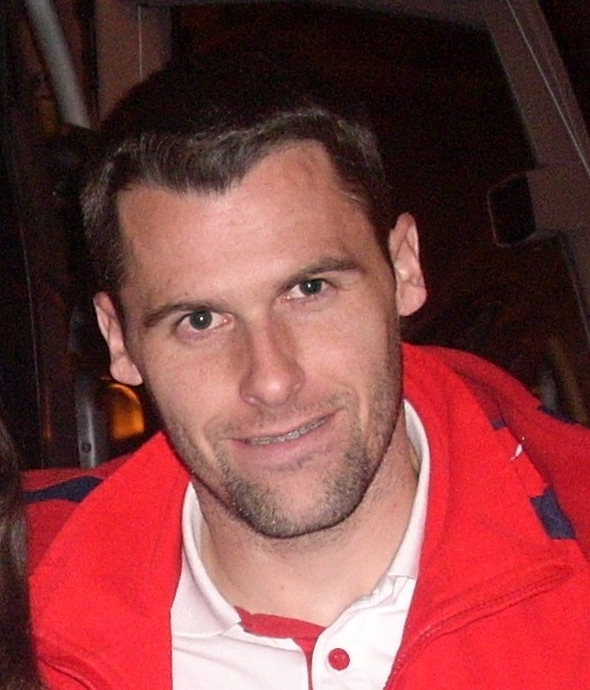
- Orbaiz as an Athletic Bilbao player (2008)

Personal information
- Full name: Pablo Orbaiz Lesaka
- Date of birth: 6 February 1979 (age 47)
- Place of birth: Pamplona, Spain
- Height: 1.79 m (5 ft 10 in)
- Position: Defensive midfielder

Youth career
- 1985–1996: Osasuna

Senior career*
Years	Team	Apps	(Gls)
1996–1998	Osasuna B	27	(2)
1996–2000	Osasuna	69	(2)
2000–2012	Athletic Bilbao	263	(10)
2011–2012	→ Olympiacos (loan)	24	(1)
2012–2013	Rubin Kazan	23	(0)
2013–2015	Valle de Egüés	?	(3)
Total		406+	(18)

International career
1997	Spain U17	5	(0)
1996–1998	Spain U18	15	(0)
1998–1999	Spain U20	12	(0)
1999–2001	Spain U21	14	(0)
2002–2005	Spain	4	(0)
2005	Navarre	1	(0)
2005–2007	Basque Country	3	(0)
Medal record
Representing Spain
Men's football
FIFA World Youth Championship
Winner	1999 Nigeria
- * Club domestic league appearances and goals

Pablo Orbaiz Lesaka (born 6 February 1979) is a Spanish former professional footballer who played as a defensive midfielder.

After starting out at Osasuna, he went on to play 11 years in La Liga with Athletic Bilbao, appearing in 318 competitive matches and scoring 13 goals.

== Club career ==
=== Osasuna and Athletic ===
Born in Pamplona, Orbaiz began his career at his hometown club Osasuna, exclusively playing in the Segunda División with the team. He contributed 29 appearances and one goal in his final season, 1999–2000, as the Navarrese returned to La Liga after a six-year absence.

In the summer of 2000, Orbaiz signed for neighbours Athletic Bilbao; the transfer was originally agreed in 1999, but the clubs then agreed that he would stay for an extra season in exchange for a loan move for Tiko in the same direction. He was a very important midfield element from the start, playing 35 league matches and scoring three goals in the 2004–05 campaign and adding eight appearances in the UEFA Cup. He also suffered serious knee injuries in 2002–03 and 2006–07.

Orbaiz continued to be first-choice when healthy in the 2009–10 season. However, from February to March 2010, he was sent off twice for dangerous challenges – both of which resulted in two-match bans – at Villarreal (2–1 loss) and at home against Getafe (2–2, he also scored the opener in the latter game).

For the following campaign, Orbaiz was promoted to team captain after the departures of Joseba Etxeberria and Francisco Yeste.

=== Later career ===
In late August 2011, after another season of regular use by manager Joaquín Caparrós – 26 games, 1,675 minutes – as Athletic once again qualified for the Europa League, the 32-year-old Orbaiz was loaned to Olympiacos in Greece, joining a host of compatriots at the Piraeus side including manager Ernesto Valverde. He won the domestic double and was able to realise his ambition of playing in the UEFA Champions League, making four group-stage appearances.

Orbaiz was subsequently released by Athletic Bilbao, signing a one-year contract with Rubin Kazan and reuniting with countryman and former Olympiacos teammate Iván Marcano. He retired in June 2015 aged 36, following a spell with amateurs Valle de Egüés.

== International career ==
Orbaiz made his debut with Spain on 21 August 2002 in a testimonial match for Ferenc Puskás against Hungary, representing the nation on a further three occasions. Previously, he helped the under-20s to win the 1999 FIFA World Youth Championship.

== Honours ==
Athletic Bilbao

- Copa del Rey runner-up: 2008–09

Olympiacos

- Super League Greece: 2011–12
- Greek Cup: 2011–12

Spain U20

- FIFA World Youth Championship: 1999
