= Francisco Yeste =

Spanish footballer (born 1979)

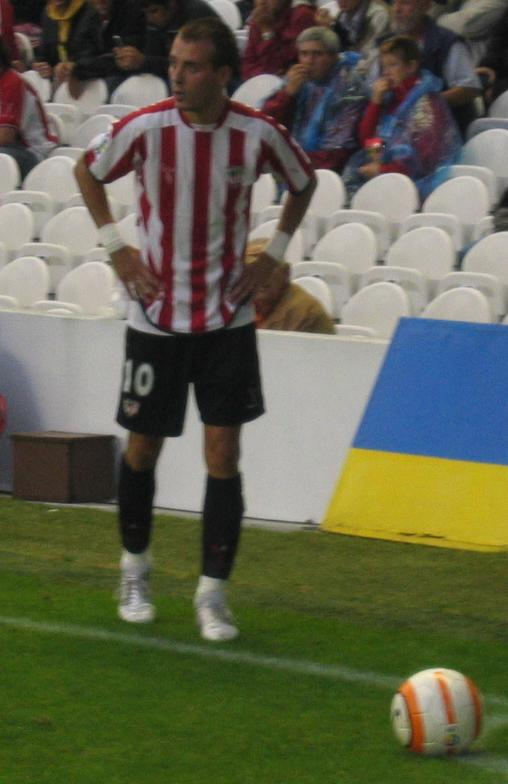
- Yeste with Athletic Bilbao in 2005

Personal information
- Full name: Francisco Javier Yeste Navarro
- Date of birth: 6 December 1979 (age 46)
- Place of birth: Basauri, Spain
- Height: 1.84 m (6 ft 0 in)
- Position: Attacking midfielder

Youth career
- 1991–1997: Athletic Bilbao

Senior career*
Years	Team	Apps	(Gls)
1997–1998	Basconia	38	(7)
1998–2000	Bilbao Athletic	34	(2)
1999–2010	Athletic Bilbao	302	(50)
2010–2011	Al Wasl	21	(9)
2011–2012	Olympiacos	5	(0)
2012	Baniyas	7	(0)
Total		407	(68)

International career
1998	Spain U18	1	(0)
1999	Spain U20	7	(0)
2000–2001	Spain U21	12	(0)
2003–2007	Basque Country	5	(3)

Managerial career
- 2014: Eldense
- 2016: Arenas Getxo (youth)
- 2016: Eldense
Medal record
Representing Spain
Men's football
FIFA World Youth Championship
Winner	1999 Nigeria
- * Club domestic league appearances and goals

Francisco "Fran" Javier Yeste Navarro (born 6 December 1979) is a Spanish former professional footballer who played as an attacking midfielder or a left winger.

He spent 12 years of his career with Athletic Bilbao (19 including his youth one), appearing in 353 competitive matches and scoring 59 goals. He also played in the United Arab Emirates and Greece, and later worked briefly as a manager.

== Club career ==
=== Athletic Bilbao ===
Born in Basauri, Biscay, and a product of Athletic Bilbao's youth academy at Lezama, Yeste made his first-team debut on 7 February 1999, playing the full 90 minutes in a 2–0 away loss against Racing de Santander. He would total a further 13 appearances over that and the following seasons, while mainly registered with the reserves.

From 2000–01 onwards, Yeste was used regularly by the main squad, scoring six La Liga goals that year including two in a 4–0 home win over Real Oviedo on 10 December 2000. After regular displays in 2003–04 he won a callup for Spain, although he did not make his debut; he scored a career-best eleven goals in the latter campaign, with the Basques finishing fifth and qualifying for the UEFA Cup.

At times troubled with injuries, Yeste continued to feature prominently, playing all the league matches in 2006–07 as Athletic barely avoided relegation (17th) and scoring five goals in the process. A player of volatile temperament, he was also sent off five times from 2007 to 2009 and added 14 yellow cards, one of the ejections occurring after he pushed Real Madrid's Iker Casillas in a 2–5 home defeat.

Yeste featured irregularly in the 2009–10 season, also being ousted by manager Joaquín Caparrós for more than one month. In the first match upon his return, a 2–0 loss at Atlético Madrid on 25 March 2010, he was booked.

On 21 May 2010, after his contract expired, Yeste announced his departure from the club through his agent.

=== United Arab Emirates ===
On 19 June 2010, Yeste agreed to a two-year deal with Al Wasl. In March of the following year, during the 2010–11 Etisalat Emirates Cup semi-final against Al Ain, the opponents took the lead before the 50th minute (49:27) and, as they were still celebrating, he shot from the centre circle to score a goal that was described by Dutch news site Voetbal Stijl as "The fastest equaliser in the history of football" (49:54).

There was controversy surrounding the legality of the goal, as Yeste shot the ball directly without having the ball passed from the centre circle, whilst another player was inside it, but it was later confirmed as valid, as the ball hit the ground just before crossing the goal line, and the other player inside the circle was from Al Ain.

=== Later career ===
Yeste signed with Greek champions Olympiacos in July 2011, reuniting with his former Athletic Bilbao coach Ernesto Valverde. On 17 January 2012, his one-year contract was mutually terminated, and he had previously been subject to disciplinary proceedings for undergoing arthroscopy in Vitoria-Gasteiz without notifying the club; the following day, he returned to the United Arab Emirates and joined Baniyas for six months.

After retiring, Yeste was briefly in charge of lower-league Eldense; in the first of his two spells, he was suspended for three months by the Royal Spanish Football Federation for not possessing the necessary coaching badges. He was also a youth manager at Arenas de Getxo.

== International career ==
Yeste made five appearances for Spain at the 1999 FIFA World Youth Championship, starting the 3–1 win over Honduras in the group stage for the eventual champions.

== Honours ==
Basconia

- Tercera División: 1997–98

Athletic Bilbao

- Copa del Rey runner-up: 2008–09
- Supercopa de España runner-up: 2009

Olympiacos

- Super League Greece: 2011–12

Spain U20

- FIFA World Youth Championship: 1999
