= 1997–98 Athletic Bilbao season =

Athletic Bilbao
1997–98 season
- President: José María Arrate
- Head coach: Luis Fernández
- Stadium: San Mamés
- La Liga: 2nd
- Copa del Rey: Quarterfinals
- UEFA Cup: 2nd round
- Top goalscorer: League: Joseba Etxeberria, 11; All: Joseba Etxeberria, 13

The 1997–98 season was the 97th season in Athletic Bilbao's history and their 67th consecutive season in La Liga, the top division of Spanish football.

== Season summary ==
The previous season, Luis Fernández's first as head coach, was a successful one for Athletic, as their 6th-place finish in La Liga gained them a place in the 1997–98 UEFA Cup first round after a two-year exile from European competition. The Frenchman's second La Liga campaign yielded even greater success: Bilbao finished as runners-up, behind only Barcelona, and qualified for the 1998–99 UEFA Champions League. This was their highest league finish, and first qualification for Europe's premier competition, since their last La Liga triumph in 1984.

They also had a good run in the Copa del Rey, reaching the quarterfinals for the first time since 1994–95. They were eliminated on away goals by eventual runners-up Mallorca.

Athletic's UEFA Cup first round opponents were Sampdoria of Italy. The Spaniards took a valuable 2–1 win in the first leg in Genoa, and secured passage to the second round with a 2–0 victory at San Mamés. Their reward was a second round tie against Aston Villa of England, with the first leg in Bilbao finishing goalless. The Birmingham side took a 2–0 lead just after half time at Villa Park, and a late goal from Javi González was not enough to prevent Athletic's elimination.

== Squad statistics ==
=== Appearances and goals ===
No.	Pos	Nat	Player	Total		La Liga		Copa del Rey		UEFA Cup	
No.	Pos	Nat	Player	Apps	Goals	Apps	Goals	Apps	Goals	Apps	Goals
1	GK	(Spain) ESP	Juan José Valencia	4	0	0	0	4	0	0	0
4	DF	(Spain) ESP	Rafael Alkorta	34	1	29	1	3	0	2	0
5	DF	(Spain) ESP	Óscar Tabuenka	0	0	0	0	0	0	0	0
6	MF	(Spain) ESP	Josu Urrutia	38	0	29+1	0	3+1	0	4	0
7	MF	(Spain) ESP	Andoni Goikoetxea	2	0	0	0	0	0	0+2	0
8	MF	(Spain) ESP	Julen Guerrero	33	8	25+4	8	3	0	0+1	0
9	FW	(Spain) ESP	Cuco Ziganda	41	5	19+16	3	2+1	1	3	1
10	DF	(Spain) ESP	Aitor Larrazábal	40	8	28+4	7	2+2	0	3+1	1
11	DF	(Spain) ESP	Jesús María Lacruz	19	0	7+10	0	1+1	0	0	0
12	DF	(Spain) ESP	Carlos García	41	2	33+1	2	4	0	3	0
13	GK	(Spain) ESP	Imanol Etxeberria	42	0	38	0	0	0	4	0
14	MF	(Spain) ESP	José Mari	16	0	3+10	0	1+2	0	0	0
15	DF	(Spain) ESP	Patxi Ferreira	19	0	9+7	0	2	0	1	0
16	MF	(Spain) ESP	Txomin Nagore	21	0	11+6	0	1+1	0	2	0
17	FW	(Spain) ESP	Joseba Etxeberria	43	12	35+1	11	3+1	1	3	0
18	MF	(Spain) ESP	Bittor Alkiza	44	2	36+1	1	3	1	4	0
19	DF	(Spain) ESP	Mikel Lasa	35	1	17+11	1	3	0	3+1	0
20	FW	(Spain) ESP	Ismael Urzaiz	38	10	23+9	8	2+1	2	2+1	0
21	DF	(Spain) ESP	Iñigo Larrainzar	41	3	34	2	2+1	0	4	1
22	MF	(Spain) ESP	Javi González	37	6	8+22	5	2+1	0	2+2	1
24	DF	(Spain) ESP	Roberto Ríos	39	3	31+1	2	3	0	4	1
25	FW	(Spain) ESP	Aitor Huegún	1	0	0+1	0	0	0	0	0
26	GK	(Spain) ESP	Iñaki Lafuente	0	0	0	0	0	0	0	0
27	DF	(Spain) ESP	César	1	0	0+1	0	0	0	0	0
28	FW	(Spain) ESP	Mario Bermejo	3	0	0+1	0	0	0	0+2	0
31	MF	(Spain) ESP	Gaizka Garitano	0	0	0	0	0	0	0	0
35	MF	(Spain) ESP	Jorge Pérez	7	0	3+4	0	0	0	0	0
	MF	(Spain) ESP	Raúl Gil	0	0	0	0	0	0	0	0

1. Tabuenka was transferred to SD Compostela during the season.

== Results ==
=== La Liga ===
==== League table ====
Pos	Team	Pld	W	D	L	GF	GA	GD	Pts	Qualification or relegation
1	Barcelona (C)	38	23	5	10	78	56	+22	74	Qualification for the Champions League group stage
2	Athletic Bilbao	38	17	14	7	52	42	+10	65	Qualification for the Champions League second qualifying round
3	Real Sociedad	38	16	15	7	60	37	+23	63 (Note: RMA 2–0 RSO; RSO 4–2 RMA)	Qualification for the UEFA Cup first round
4	Real Madrid	38	17	12	9	63	45	+18	63	Qualification for the Champions League group stage (Note: Real Madrid was qualified directly for the 1998–99 UEFA Champions League as holders.)
5	Mallorca	38	16	12	10	55	39	+16	60 (Note: MLL: 9 pts; CEL: 5 pts; ATM: 2 pts)	Qualification for the Cup Winners' Cup first round (Note: Since Barcelona, winners of 1997–98 Copa del Rey, was qualified for the 1998–99 UEFA Champions League, losing cup finalists RCD Mallorca earned a spot in the first round of the 1998–99 UEFA Cup Winners' Cup.)

Source: LFP
Rules for classification: 1) points; 2) head-to-head points; 3) head-to-head goal difference; 4) head-to-head goals scored; 5) goal difference; 6) number of goals scored.
(C) Champions

=== UEFA Cup ===
==== First round ====
16 September 1997	Sampdoria (Italy)	1–2	(Spain) Athletic Bilbao	Stadio Luigi Ferraris, Genoa
20:30	Boghossian 74'	Report	Ríos 19'; Larrainzar 62'	Attendance: 36,000; Referee: Ahmet Çakar (Turkey)

30 September 1997	Athletic Bilbao (Spain)	2–0	(Italy) Sampdoria	San Mamés Stadium, Bilbao
20:30	Larrazábal 40' (pen.); Ziganda 47'	Report		Attendance: 42,000; Referee: Marc Batta (France)

Athletic Bilbao won 4–1 on aggregate

==== Second round ====
21 October 1997	Athletic Bilbao (Spain)	0–0	(England) Aston Villa	San Mamés Stadium, Bilbao
21:30		Report		Attendance: 42,500; Referee: Hartmut Strampe (Germany)

4 November 1997	Aston Villa (England)	2–1	(Spain) Athletic Bilbao	Villa Park, Birmingham
20:30	Taylor 27'; Yorke 50'	Report	González 70'	Attendance: 35,915; Referee: S. Piller (Hungary)

Aston Villa won 2–1 on aggregate

== See also ==
- 1997–98 Copa del Rey
- Athletic Bilbao in European football
