= 1999–2000 Athletic Bilbao season =

Athletic Bilbao
1999–2000 season
- President: José María Arrate
- Head coach: Luis Fernández
- Stadium: San Mamés
- La Liga: 11th
- Copa del Rey: Second round
- Top goalscorer: League: Joseba Etxeberria (10 goals); All: Joseba Etxeberria (12 goals)
Home colours	Away colours	Third colours

The 1999–2000 season was the 99th season in Athletic Bilbao's history and their 69th consecutive season in La Liga, the top division of Spanish football.

== Season summary ==
1999–2000, the fourth season of Luis Fernández's tenure as head coach, was his least successful so far in terms of both league and cup results. It was the first La Liga campaign of the Frenchman's reign in which Athletic finished outside the top ten, placing 11th. They also suffered an early exit from the Copa del Rey, losing in the second round to Rayo Vallecano.

Fernández left his post at the end of the season, and Real Zaragoza's Txetxu Rojo was appointed in his place. Rojo had had two previous spells at San Mamés – as a successful forward between 1965 and 1982, and as head coach in the latter part of the 1989–90 season.

== Squad statistics ==
=== Appearances and goals ===
No.	Pos	Nat	Player	Total		La Liga		Copa del Rey	
No.	Pos	Nat	Player	Apps	Goals	Apps	Goals	Apps	Goals
3	MF	(Spain) ESP	Óscar Vales	7	0	5	0	2	0
4	DF	(Spain) ESP	Rafael Alkorta	26	1	24	1	2	0
5	MF	(Spain) ESP	Felipe Guréndez	37	0	31+3	0	2+1	0
6	MF	(Spain) ESP	Josu Urrutia	30	0	27+2	0	1	0
7	MF	(Spain) ESP	Andoni Imaz	16	0	5+8	0	3	0
8	MF	(Spain) ESP	Julen Guerrero	35	6	28+4	6	3	0
9	FW	(Spain) ESP	Santi Ezquerro	30	6	22+6	6	2	0
10	DF	(Spain) ESP	Aitor Larrazábal	27	4	22+4	4	1	0
11	DF	(Spain) ESP	Jesús María Lacruz	31	4	28+2	4	1	0
12	DF	(Spain) ESP	Carlos García	30	4	23+4	3	3	1
13	GK	(Spain) ESP	Imanol Etxeberria	26	0	26	0	0	0
14	MF	(Spain) ESP	José Mari	13	1	10+2	1	1	0
15	DF	(Spain) ESP	Patxi Ferreira	28	1	23+2	1	3	0
16	FW	(Spain) ESP	Sívori	15	0	2+11	0	1+1	0
17	FW	(Spain) ESP	Joseba Etxeberria	37	12	33+2	10	0+2	2
18	MF	(Spain) ESP	Bittor Alkiza	30	0	26+1	0	3	0
19	DF	(Spain) ESP	Mikel Lasa	4	0	3	0	1	0
20	FW	(Spain) ESP	Ismael Urzaiz	37	7	22+11	5	4	2
21	DF	(Spain) ESP	Iñigo Larrainzar	17	0	13+1	0	2+1	0
22	MF	(Spain) ESP	Javi González	26	0	5+17	0	2+2	0
23	MF	(Spain) ESP	Edu Alonso	26	0	10+13	0	2+1	0
24	DF	(Spain) ESP	Roberto Ríos	6	0	4+2	0	0	0
26	GK	(Spain) ESP	Iñaki Lafuente	18	0	12+2	0	4	0
28	MF	(Spain) ESP	Francisco Yeste	6	0	4+2	0	0	0
31	MF	(Spain) ESP	Tiko	20	1	8+9	1	1+2	0
35	FW	(Spain) ESP	David Asensio	1	0	1	0	0	0
36	FW	(Spain) ESP	David Karanka	2	0	0+2	0	0	0
37	DF	(Spain) ESP	Unai Expósito	2	0	1+1	0	0	0

== Results ==
=== La Liga ===
==== League table ====
Pos	Team	Pld	W	D	L	GF	GA	GD	Pts	Qualification or relegation
9	Rayo Vallecano	38	15	7	16	51	53	−2	52	Qualification for the UEFA Cup qualifying round (Note: Rayo Vallecano earned a spot in the qualifying round of the 2000–01 UEFA Cup as being elected by UEFA as one of the two best entries of UEFA Fair play.)
10	Mallorca	38	14	9	15	52	45	+7	51	Qualification for the Intertoto Cup second round
11	Athletic Bilbao	38	12	14	12	47	57	−10	50	
12	Málaga	38	11	15	12	55	50	+5	48	
13	Real Sociedad	38	11	14	13	42	49	−7	47 (Note: ESP 0–0 RSO; RSO 1–0 ESP)	

Source: LFP
Rules for classification: 1) points; 2) head-to-head points; 3) head-to-head goal difference; 4) head-to-head goals scored; 5) goal difference; 6) number of goals scored.

== See also ==
- 1999–2000 La Liga
- 1999–2000 Copa del Rey
