= 1998–99 Athletic Bilbao season =

Athletic Bilbao
1998–99 season
- La Liga: 8th
- Copa del Rey: Round of 16
- UEFA Champions League: Group stage
- Top goalscorer: League: Ismael Urzaiz (16); All: Ismael Urzaiz (17)
Home colours	Away colours

== Season summary ==
Athletic had finished second the previous season, and though they gathered only five points fewer - all from losing instead of drawing games - this was enough to drag them down to 8th place.

The club had applied and qualified for the Intertoto Cup, but in the end declined to enter the competition.

== Squad ==
Squad at end of season

Note: Flags indicate national team as defined under FIFA eligibility rules; some limited exceptions apply. Players may hold more than one non-FIFA nationality.

No.	Pos.	Nation	Player
1	GK	ESP	Juan José Valencia
4	DF	ESP	Rafael Alkorta
5	MF	ESP	Felipe
6	MF	ESP	Josu Urrutia
7	MF	ESP	Andoni Imaz
8	MF	ESP	Julen Guerrero
9	FW	ESP	Santiago Ezquerro
10	DF	ESP	Aitor Larrazabal
11	DF	ESP	Jesús María Lacruz
12	DF	ESP	Carlos García
13	GK	ESP	Imanol Etxeberria
14	MF	ESP	José Mari
15	DF	ESP	Patxi Ferreira

No.	Pos.	Nation	Player
16	MF	ESP	Txomin Nagore
17	MF	ESP	Joseba Etxeberria
18	MF	ESP	Bittor Alkiza
19	DF	ESP	Mikel Lasa
20	FW	ESP	Ismael Urzaiz
21	DF	ESP	Iñigo Larrainzar
22	MF	ESP	Javi González
23	MF	ESP	Jorge Pérez
24	DF	ESP	Roberto Ríos
26	GK	ESP	Daniel Aranzubia
27	DF	ESP	César
32	MF	ESP	Francisco Yeste

=== Left club during season ===
Note: Flags indicate national team as defined under FIFA eligibility rules; some limited exceptions apply. Players may hold more than one non-FIFA nationality.

No.	Pos.	Nation	Player
25	FW	ESP	Bolo (to Rayo Vallecano)

=== La Liga ===
==== League table ====
Pos	Team	Pld	W	D	L	GF	GA	GD	Pts	Qualification or relegation
6	Deportivo La Coruña	38	17	12	9	55	43	+12	63	Qualification for the UEFA Cup first round
7	Espanyol	38	16	13	9	49	38	+11	61	Qualification for the Intertoto Cup third round
8	Athletic Bilbao (Note: Despite being qualified and registered, Athletic Bilbao refused to play Intertoto)	38	17	9	12	53	47	+6	60	
9	Zaragoza	38	16	9	13	57	46	+11	57	
10	Real Sociedad	38	14	12	12	47	43	+4	54	

Source: LFP
Rules for classification: 1) points; 2) head-to-head points; 3) head-to-head goal difference; 4) head-to-head goals scored; 5) goal difference; 6) number of goals scored.

== Results ==
=== Champions League ===
==== Group stage ====
16 September 1998	Athletic Bilbao (Spain)	1–1	(Norway) Rosenborg	San Mamés Stadium, Bilbao
20:45	Etxeberria 7'	Report	Strand 64'	Attendance: 36,000; Referee: Vasyl Melnychuk (Ukraine)

30 September 1998	Galatasaray (Turkey)	2–1	(Spain) Athletic Bilbao	Ali Sami Yen Stadium, Istanbul
20:45	Okan 16'; Hagi 90+3'	Report	Urzaiz 17'	Attendance: 19,828; Referee: Graham Poll (England)

21 October 1998	Athletic Bilbao (Spain)	0–0	(Italy) Juventus	San Mamés Stadium, Bilbao
20:45		Report		Attendance: 39,000; Referee: Kim Milton Nielsen (Denmark)

4 November 1998	Juventus (Italy)	1–1	(Spain) Athletic Bilbao	Stadio delle Alpi, Turin
20:45	Lasa 68' (o.g.)	Report	Guerrero 45'	Attendance: 44,584; Referee: Hugh Dallas (Scotland)

25 November 1998	Rosenborg (Norway)	2–1	(Spain) Athletic Bilbao	Lerkendal Stadion, Trondheim
20:45	Sørensen 2', 50'	Report	Pérez 90'	Attendance: 15,454; Referee: Bernd Heynemann (Germany)

9 December 1998	Athletic Bilbao (Spain)	1–0	(Turkey) Galatasaray	San Mamés Stadium, Bilbao
20:45	Guerrero 44'	Report		Attendance: 16,000; Referee: Urs Meier (Switzerland)

== See also ==
- 1998–99 Copa del Rey
- Athletic Bilbao in European football
