= 2000–01 Athletic Bilbao season =

Athletic Bilbao
2000–01 season
- President: José María Arrate
- Head coach: Txetxu Rojo
- Stadium: San Mamés
- La Liga: 12th
- Copa del Rey: Round of 16
- Top goalscorer: League: Ismael Urzaiz (10 goals); All: Ismael Urzaiz (13 goals)
Home colours	Away colours	Third colours

The 2000–01 season was the 100th season in Athletic Bilbao's history and their 70th consecutive season in La Liga, the top division of Spanish football.

== Season summary ==
Athletic Bilbao began their centenary season with a new head coach following the departure of Frenchman Luis Fernández. Fernández had been in charge for four years, becoming Athletic's most successful coach for a generation by leading them to the runners-up spot in La Liga in 1997–98. To replace him, Bilbao legend Txetxu Rojo was tempted away from Real Zaragoza, who he had just guided to an exceptional 5th place in the league, six places higher than his new club. This would be Rojo's second spell at San Mamés, having previously led the team briefly during the 1989–90 season.

Rojo could not replicate his La Liga success with Athletic, as they slipped yet further to 12th place, their worst performance for five years. They fared little better in the Copa del Rey, being eliminated at the last 16 stage by Racing Santander.

Rojo departed at the end of the season, returning to Zaragoza, and was replaced by another returning former coach, German Jupp Heynckes, who had most recently been manager of Benfica in Portugal.

== Squad statistics ==
=== Appearances and goals ===
No.	Pos	Nat	Player	Total		La Liga		Copa del Rey	
No.	Pos	Nat	Player	Apps	Goals	Apps	Goals	Apps	Goals
1	GK	(Spain) ESP	Iñaki Lafuente	36	0	36	0	0	0
2	DF	(Spain) ESP	Iñigo Larrainzar	28	1	24+1	1	3	0
3	MF	(Spain) ESP	Óscar Vales	35	0	30+1	0	4	0
4	DF	(Spain) ESP	Rafael Alkorta	17	0	17	0	0	0
5	MF	(Spain) ESP	Felipe Guréndez	35	1	20+11	1	2+2	0
6	MF	(Spain) ESP	Josu Urrutia	23	1	20+1	1	2	0
7	MF	(Spain) ESP	Andoni Imaz	3	0	0+2	0	0+1	0
8	MF	(Spain) ESP	Julen Guerrero	29	4	25+2	4	2	0
9	FW	(Spain) ESP	Santi Ezquerro	19	3	14+5	3	0	0
10	DF	(Spain) ESP	Aitor Larrazábal	28	4	25	4	3	0
11	DF	(Spain) ESP	Jesús María Lacruz	33	1	30+1	1	2	0
12	DF	(Spain) ESP	Carlos García	7	0	7	0	0	0
13	GK	(Spain) ESP	Imanol Etxeberria	0	0	0	0	0	0
14	DF	(Spain) ESP	Roberto Ríos	20	1	15+2	1	3	0
15	MF	(Spain) ESP	Carlos Merino	7	0	0+7	0	0	0
16	MF	(Spain) ESP	Francisco Yeste	38	7	13+21	6	3+1	1
17	FW	(Spain) ESP	Joseba Etxeberria	31	5	26+2	5	3	0
18	MF	(Spain) ESP	Bittor Alkiza	26	1	18+4	1	3+1	0
19	DF	(Spain) ESP	Mikel Lasa	6	0	4+1	0	0+1	0
20	FW	(Spain) ESP	Ismael Urzaiz	38	13	34	10	4	3
22	MF	(Spain) ESP	Javi González	29	3	15+11	3	2+1	0
23	MF	(Spain) ESP	Tiko	25	2	9+13	2	1+2	0
24	MF	(Spain) ESP	Pablo Orbaiz	31	0	23+4	0	2+2	0
25	GK	(Spain) ESP	Dani Aranzubia	6	0	2	0	4	0
27	DF	(Spain) ESP	Asier del Horno	15	0	11+3	0	1	0
35	FW	(Spain) ESP	David Asensio	2	0	0+2	0	0	0
37	MF	(Spain) ESP	David Cuéllar	9	0	0+8	0	0+1	0
38	MF	(Spain) ESP	Unai Expósito	0	0	0	0	0	0

== Results ==
=== La Liga ===
==== League table ====
Pos	Team	Pld	W	D	L	GF	GA	GD	Pts
10	Alavés	38	14	7	17	58	59	−1	49
11	Las Palmas	38	13	7	18	42	62	−20	46
12	Athletic Bilbao	38	11	10	17	44	60	−16	43 (Note: ATH: 9 pts; RSO: 6 pts; RVA: 3 pts)
13	Real Sociedad	38	11	10	17	52	68	−16	43
14	Rayo Vallecano	38	10	13	15	56	68	−12	43

Source: LFP
Rules for classification: 1st points; 2nd head-to-head points; 3rd head-to-head goal difference; 4th head-to-head goals scored; 5th goal difference; 6th number of goals scored; 7th Fair-play points

== See also ==
- 2000–01 La Liga
- 2000–01 Copa del Rey
