= 1996–97 Athletic Bilbao season =

Athletic Bilbao
1996–97 season
- President: José María Arrate
- Head coach: Luis Fernández
- Stadium: San Mamés
- La Liga: 6th (In 1997–98 UEFA Cup)
- Copa del Rey: Fourth round
- Top goalscorer: League: Cuco Ziganda (17); All: Ismael Urzaiz (18)
Home colours	Away colours

The 1996–97 season was the 96th season in Athletic Bilbao's history and their 66th consecutive season in La Liga, the top division of Spanish football.

== Season summary ==
Athletic had been without a permanent head coach since replacing Dragoslav Stepanović with caretaker manager José María Amorrortu in March 1996. They filled the vacancy ahead of the new season by appointing Spanish-born Frenchman Luis Fernández, previously manager of Paris Saint-Germain in his adopted homeland.

Fernández's appointment led to an immediate improvement in league form, and Bilbao finished the La Liga season in 6th place. This was their best league finish since 1993–94, and also meant a return to the UEFA Cup in 1997–98.

Their performance in the Copa del Rey, however, left room for improvement. They were eliminated at the last sixteen stage by Racing Santander, following an ill-tempered second leg at San Mamés which saw three players red carded.

== Squad statistics ==
=== Appearances and goals ===
No.	Pos	Nat	Player	Total		La Liga		Copa del Rey	
No.	Pos	Nat	Player	Apps	Goals	Apps	Goals	Apps	Goals
1	GK	(Spain) ESP	Juanjo Valencia	23	0	23	0	0	0
21	DF	(Spain) ESP	Iñigo Larrainzar	40	1	38+1	1	1	0
4	DF	(Spain) ESP	Aitor Karanka	39	1	35+2	1	2	0
10	DF	(Spain) ESP	Aitor Larrazábal	40	5	35+2	5	2+1	0
6	MF	(Spain) ESP	Josu Urrutia	39	0	36+1	0	1+1	0
8	MF	(Spain) ESP	Julen Guerrero	43	16	37+1	15	5	1
18	MF	(Spain) ESP	Bittor Alkiza	43	4	36+3	3	2+2	1
23	MF	(Spain) ESP	José Mari	36	2	28+5	2	3	0
9	FW	(Spain) ESP	Cuco Ziganda	46	17	31+11	17	1+3	0
11	FW	(Spain) ESP	Ismael Urzaiz	42	18	30+8	16	4	2
13	GK	(Spain) ESP	Imanol Etxeberria	25	0	19	0	6	0
17	FW	(Spain) ESP	Joseba Etxeberria	36	6	25+10	6	0+1	0
12	DF	(Spain) ESP	Carlos García	17	3	17	3	0	0
3	DF	(France) FRA	Bixente Lizarazu	18	0	16	0	1+1	0
14	MF	(Spain) ESP	Óscar Vales	27	0	15+8	0	4	0
7	MF	(Spain) ESP	Andoni Goikoetxea	37	0	10+21	0	5+1	0
15	DF	(Spain) ESP	Sergio Corino	18	1	8+7	0	3	1
27	MF	(Spain) ESP	Felipe Guréndez	18	0	6+7	0	5	0
24	MF	(Spain) ESP	Edu Alonso	13	0	5+3	0	5	0
5	DF	(Spain) ESP	Genar Andrinúa (c)	12	2	4+4	1	4	1
22	DF	(Spain) ESP	Óscar Tabuenka	4	0	3+1	0	0	0
28	FW	(Spain) ESP	Bolo	25	3	2+17	1	3+3	2
20	DF	(Spain) ESP	Eduardo Estíbariz	8	0	2+2	0	3+1	0
29	MF	(Spain) ESP	Mikel Kortina	3	1	1+1	1	0+1	0
	FW	(Spain) ESP	Álvaro Florentino	4	1	0+1	0	3	1
	MF	(Spain) ESP	Raúl Otxoa	3	0	0	0	2+1	0
	DF	(Spain) ESP	Javier Díaz Neira	1	0	0	0	1	0
16	MF	(Spain) ESP	Ricardo Mendiguren	0	0	0	0	0	0
26	GK	(Spain) ESP	Iñaki Lafuente	0	0	0	0	0	0
	FW	(Spain) ESP	Ibán Espadas	0	0	0	0	0	0
	FW	(Spain) ESP	David Gallo	0	0	0	0	0	0
	MF	(Spain) ESP	Raúl Gil	0	0	0	0	0	0

1. Mendiguren was transferred to Las Palmas during the season.
2. Bolo was loaned to Osasuna during the season.

== Results ==
=== La Liga ===
==== League table ====
Pos	Team	Pld	W	D	L	GF	GA	GD	Pts	Qualification or relegation
4	Real Betis	42	21	14	7	81	46	+35	77 (Note: BET 1–2 DEP; DEP 3–0 BET)	Qualification for the Cup Winners' Cup first round (Note: Since Barcelona, winners of 1996–97 Copa del Rey, was qualified for the 1997–98 UEFA Champions League, losing cup finalists Real Betis earned a spot in the first round of the 1997–98 UEFA Cup Winners' Cup.)
5	Atlético Madrid	42	20	11	11	76	64	+12	71	Qualification for the UEFA Cup first round
6	Athletic Bilbao	42	16	16	10	72	57	+15	64 (Note: VLD 0–0 ATH; ATH 0–0 VLD)	Qualification for the UEFA Cup first round
7	Valladolid	42	18	10	14	57	46	+11	64	Qualification for the UEFA Cup first round
8	Real Sociedad	42	18	9	15	50	47	+3	63	

Source: LFP
Rules for classification: 1) points; 2) head-to-head points; 3) head-to-head goal difference; 4) head-to-head goals scored; 5) goal difference; 6) number of goals scored.

==== Matches ====
1 September 1996 1	Real Betis	3–0	Athletic	Sevilla
	Finidi George 14'; Roberto Rios 44'; Sabas 85'			Stadium: Benito Villamarin; Attendance: 45000

2	Athletic Bilbao	3–2	Rayo Vallecano	Bilbao
	Carlos Garcia 51'; Ziganda 68'; Jose Mari 75'		Guilherme 40'; Ameli 73'	Stadium: San Mamés; Attendance: 35,000

15 September 1996 3	Real Oviedo	2–0	Athletic
	Oli 61'; Paulo Bento 83'			Attendance: 13,000

21 September 1996 4	Athletic Bilbao	2–2	RCD Espanyol	Bilbao
	Larrazabal 19 (p)' Bolo 46'		Luis 54 (p)' Pochettino 81'	Stadium: San Mamés; Attendance: 30,000

28 September 1996 5	Racing Santander	1–2	Athletic
	Bestchastnisch 28'		Urzaiz 39'; Ziganda 70'	Attendance: 19,000

2 October 1996 6	Athletic Bilbao	1–3	Real Sociedad	Bilbao
	Ziganda 36'		Craioveanu 25'; De Paula 31'; Idiakez 82'	Stadium: San Mamés; Attendance: 40,000

12 October 1996 7	Real Zaragoza	1–1	Athletic	Zaragoza
	Higuera 46'		16' Ziganda	Stadium: La Romareda; Attendance: 30000

19 October 1996 8	Athletic	2–0	CD Tenerife	Bilbao
				Stadium: San Mamés

23 October 1996 9	SD Compostela	1–1	Athletic
	Penev 47'		Guerrero 72'	Attendance: 8,500

27 October 1996 10	Athletic Bilbao	6–0	Logroñés CF	Bilbao
	Guerrero 9', 40', 71'; Ziganda 30', 67'; Etxeberria 22'			Stadium: San Mamés; Attendance: 38,000

3 November 1996 11	Sevilla FC	4–2	Athletic
	Rafa Paz 7 (p)', 87'; Tevenet 37'; Salva 69'		Urzaiz 4'; Guerrero 80'	Attendance: 46,350

16 November 1996 12	Athletic	2–0	Valencia CF	Bilbao
	Ziganda 16'; Etxeberria 77'			Stadium: San Mamés; Attendance: 40,000

17 November 1996 13	Sporting Gijon	2–4	Athletic	Gijón
	Sergio 9'; Julio Salinas 82'	Report	Urzaiz 5'; Guerrero 56'; Ziganda 68', 78'	Stadium: El Molinón; Referee: Prados García

23 November 1996 14	Athletic	2–1	FC Barcelona	Bilbao
	Jose Mari 62' (yellow card); Guerrero 76'; Korino (yellow card); Alkiza (yellow card)	Report	25' Abelardo; (yellow card) Sergi Barjuan; (yellow card) Guardiola; (yellow card) Couto	Stadium: San Mamés; Referee: Hernanz Angulo

1 December 1996 15	Real Valladolid	0–0	Athletic
				Attendance: 25,000

7 December 1996 16	Athletic	1–1	Atlético Madrid	Bilbao
	Etxebarria 67'		40' Pantic	Stadium: San Mamés; Attendance: 40,000

22 December 1996 17	Athletic Bilbao	0–0	Extremadura UD	Bilbao
				Stadium: San Mamés; Attendance: 35,000

5 January 1997 18	Real Madrid	1–0	Athletic	Madrid
	Raúl 59'	Report		Stadium: Santiago Bernabéu

12 January 1997 19	Athletic	2 – 2	Celta Vigo	Bilbao, Spain
	Ziganda 7'; Alkiza 55'	Report	51' Gudelj; 76' Berges	Stadium: San Mamés; Referee: Manuel Díaz Vega

19 January 1996 20	Deportivo La Coruña	2–2	Athletic	A Coruña
	Donato 4' (pen.); Martins 44'		26' Ziganda; 87' Guerrero	Stadium: Riazor; Attendance: 22,000

26 January 1997 21	Athletic Bilbao	5–0	Hércules CF	Bilbao
	Ziganda 19', 65'; Larrainzar 34'; Guerrero 60', 84'			Stadium: San Mamés; Attendance: 35,000

2 February 1997 22	Athletic	0–3	Real Betis	Bilbao
		Report	4' Alfonso; 25' Olias; 72' Kowalczyk 72	Stadium: San Mamés; Attendance: 40,000

9 February 1997 23	Rayo Vallecano	1–1	Athletic
	Moreau 15'		Urzaiz 70'	Attendance: 12,000

16 February 1997 24	Athletic Bilbao	3–2	Real Oviedo	Bilbao
	Urzaiz 49', 67', 85'		Gamboa 20'; Ivan Ania 79'	Stadium: San Mamés; Attendance: 36,000

19 February 1997 25	RCD Espanyol	0–2	Athletic
			Larrazabal 10'; Urzaiz 60'	Attendance: 21,000

23 February 1997 26	Athletic Bilbao	2–2	Racing Santander	Bilbao
	Urzaiz 54'; Larrazabal 64 (p)'		Correa 2 (p)' Arpon 46'	Stadium: San Mamés; Attendance: 40,000

2 March 1997 27	Real Sociedad	0–0	Athletic
				Attendance: 30,000

9 March 1997 28	Athletic	2–2	Real Zaragoza	Bilbao
	Etxeberria 21'; Karanka 32'		17' Poyet; 90' Poyet	Stadium: San Mamés; Attendance: 37000

14 March 1997 29	CD Tenerife	3–3	Athletic	Santa Cruz de Tenerife
				Stadium: Heliodoro Rodriguez

23 March 1997 30	Athletic Bilbao	2–2	SD Compostela	Bilbao
	Guerrero 37', 45'		Popov 52'; Penev 84'	Stadium: San Mamés; Attendance: 40,000

30 March 1997 31	Logroñés CF	1–4	Athletic
	Ruben Sosa 7'		Ziganda 10', 74'; Urzaiz 38', 67'	Attendance: 13,000

6 April 1997 32	Athletic Bilbao	0–0	Sevilla FC	Anoeta
				Attendance: 28,600

12 April 1997 33	Valencia CF	5–2	Athletic	Valencia
	Ortega 2', 26' (pen.); Moya 29'; Leandro 3', 34'		43', 65' Urzaiz	Stadium: Mestalla; Attendance: 40,000

16 April 1997 34	Athletic	4–0	Sporting Gijon	Bilbao
	Larrazábal 42' (pen.); Urzaiz 46', 57'; Guerrero 72'	Summary		Stadium: San Mamés; Referee: Japón Sevilla

20 April 1997 35	FC Barcelona	2–0	Athletic	Barcelona
	Abelardo 48'; Ronaldo 64'	Report		Stadium: Camp Nou; Attendance: 65,000; Referee: Puentes Leira

4 May 1997 36	Athletic Bilbao	0–0	Real Valladolid	Bilbao
				Stadium: San Mamés; Attendance: 40,000

10 May 1997 37	Atlético Madrid	2–1	Athletic	Madrid
	Karanka 13' (o.g.); Kiko 73'		30' Carlos Garcia	Stadium: Vicente Calderón; Attendance: 40,000

18 May 1997 38	Extremadura UD	1–2	Athletic
	Juanito 85'		Alkiza 24'; Ziganda 84'	Attendance: 11,000

24 May 1997 39	Athletic	1–0	Real Madrid	Bilbao
	Carlos García 56'	Report		Stadium: San Mames

1 June 1997 40	Celta Vigo	0 – 2	Athletic	Vigo, Spain
		Report	65' Ziganda; 75' Etxeberria	Stadium: Balaídos; Referee: Fernando Carmona Méndez

16 June 1997 41	Athletic	1–0	Deportivo La Coruña	Bilbao
	Guerrero 63'			Stadium: San Mamés; Attendance: 40,000

22 June 1997 42	Hércules CF	3–2	Athletic
	Pavlicic 15'; Alfaro 17'; Diego Lopez 20'		Kortina 40'; Andrinua 51'	Attendance: 14,000

== See also ==
- 1996–97 La Liga
- 1996–97 Copa del Rey
