= Imanol Etxeberria =

Spanish footballer

Personal information
- Full name: Imanol Etxeberria Egaña
- Date of birth: 27 March 1973 (age 53)
- Place of birth: Bergara, Spain
- Height: 1.87 m (6 ft 2 in)
- Position: Goalkeeper

Senior career*
| Years | Team | Apps | (Gls) |
| 1992–1994 | Mondragón | | |
| 1994–1995 | Durango | | |
| 1995–1996 | Bilbao Athletic | 35 | (0) |
| 1996–2001 | Athletic Bilbao | 120 | (0) |
| 2001–2004 | Rayo Vallecano | 63 | (0) |
| 2004–2005 | Cultural Leonesa | 28 | (0) |
| 2005–2006 | Eibar | 32 | (0) |
| Total | | 278 | (0) |

International career
| 1998–2003 | Basque Country | 4 | (0) |
- * Club domestic league appearances and goals

Imanol Etxeberria Egaña (born 27 March 1973) is a Spanish retired professional footballer who played as a goalkeeper.

He appeared in 175 La Liga matches during seven seasons, with Athletic Bilbao and Rayo Vallecano.

== Playing career ==
=== Early years and Athletic ===
Born in Bergara, Gipuzkoa, Basque Country, Etxeberria began playing with local Mondragón in Tercera División, based in Arrasate. In 1994, he moved to Durango at the same level, helping them promote to Segunda División B in his sole season.

Exteberria's performances drew the attention of regional giants Athletic Bilbao, and in summer 1995 he was signed on the recommendation of goalkeeping legend José Ángel Iribar, joining a professional club for the first time at the relatively old age of 22. He was initially assigned to the reserve team, who was eventually relegated from Segunda División.

Etxeberria was promoted to the main squad for 1996–97, and after spending the first half of the campaign as back-up to Juanjo Valencia he made his La Liga debut on 9 February 1997 in a 1–1 away draw against Rayo Vallecano, and subsequently became the starter. The former later stated that he enjoyed competition between them, and that he considered the latter a friend (both went on to work as youth coaches at San Mamés).

In 1997–98, Etxeberria played all 38 league games as the Lions finished in second position, adding 37 the following season. In that year's UEFA Champions League group stage, even though his team ranked last, he conceded only six goals in as many matches.

Etxeberria eventually lost his starting position to Iñaki Lafuente, being further demoted to third-choice by fellow youth graduate Daniel Aranzubia under manager Txetxu Rojo. He was willing to leave the club, but Athletic asked for a transfer fee which no other clubs were willing to meet, so he remained on the payroll without making a single appearance during the 2000–01 campaign; he left on 30 June 2001, having made 140 appearances all competitions comprised.

=== Rayo and later career ===
Etxeberria then moved to fellow league side Rayo Vallecano, replacing the departed Kasey Keller. In his first season he beat competition from veteran Julen Lopetegui, helping to an 11th-place finish.

From 2002 to 2004, Etxeberria played 35 league games but was also consecutively relegated. In the latter campaign, which saw Lopetegui kickstart his managerial career, the player was largely overlooked in favour of Sergio Segura by Lopetegui's successor Jorge D'Alessandro, who then brought in another goalkeeper, his compatriot Sebastián Saja, on loan; Rojo became the third coach in February 2004, and he also had no place in his plans for Etxeberria, who was released and trained with Bilbao Athletic to stay fit.

Etxeberria then dropped down to the third level to play for Cultural Leonesa, leaving at the end of the season. He returned to division two and his native region in the summer of 2005, being first-choice for Eibar, but being relegated in last place; he then chose to retire from the game, aged 33.

=== International ===
Etxeberria never earned any caps for Spain at any level. He did feature for the unofficial Basque Country regional team.

== Coaching career ==
Afterwards, Etxeberria spent some years as goalkeeping coach for Athletic's youth teams, interrupted by a spell performing the same role at Lemona working under his former teammate Aitor Larrazábal. In 2012, he became Bilbao Athletic's goalkeeping coach as part of the backroom team led by another former teammate, José Ángel Ziganda.

When Ziganda was promoted to senior team boss in summer 2017, Etxeberria moved up with him to continue in his specialist role.

In the 2021–22 season, he was working at Manchester City, coaching the goalkeepers of the club's under-23 side which won the Premier League 2.

== Personal life ==
Etxeberria operated a training scheme for young goalkeepers, based in Deusto.

He was not related to Joseba Etxeberria, his teammate for several years at Athletic and later a colleague on the coaching staff at the club. Coincidentally, they were raised just a few miles from one another (Joseba hailed from Elgoibar).

== Career statistics ==
Appearances and goals by club, season and competition
| Club | Season | League | | | Copa del Rey | | Europe | | Other | | Total | |
| Club | Season | League | Apps | Goals | Apps | Goals | Apps | Goals | Apps | Goals | Apps | Goals |
|---|---|---|---|---|---|---|---|---|---|---|---|---|
| Bilbao Athletic | 1995–96 | Segunda División | 35 | 0 | — | | — | | — | | 35 | 0 |
| Athletic Bilbao | 1996–97 | La Liga | 19 | 0 | 6 | 0 | — | | — | | 25 | 3 |
| Athletic Bilbao | 1997–98 | La Liga | 38 | 0 | 4 | 0 | — | | — | | 42 | 0 |
| Athletic Bilbao | 1998–99 | La Liga | 37 | 0 | 2 | 0 | 8 | 0 | — | | 47 | 0 |
| Athletic Bilbao | 1999–2000 | La Liga | 26 | 0 | 0 | 0 | — | | — | | 26 | 0 |
| Athletic Bilbao | 2000–01 | La Liga | 0 | 0 | 0 | 0 | — | | — | | 0 | 0 |
| Athletic Bilbao | Total | | 120 | 0 | 12 | 0 | 8 | 0 | — | | 140 | 0 |
| Rayo Vallecano | 2001–02 | La Liga | 28 | 0 | 3 | 0 | — | | — | | 31 | 0 |
| Rayo Vallecano | 2002–03 | La Liga | 27 | 0 | 1 | 0 | — | | — | | 28 | 0 |
| Rayo Vallecano | 2003–04 | Segunda División | 8 | 0 | 1 | 0 | — | | — | | 9 | 0 |
| Rayo Vallecano | Total | | 63 | 0 | 5 | 0 | — | | — | | 68 | 0 |
| Cultural Leonesa | 2004–05 | Segunda División B | 28 | 0 | — | | — | | — | | 28 | 0 |
| Eibar | 2005–06 | Segunda División | 32 | 0 | 4 | 0 | — | | — | | 36 | 0 |
| Career total | | | 279 | 0 | 21 | 0 | 8 | 0 | 0 | 0 | 308 | 0 |
