= Iñaki Alkiza =

Spanish footballer (1933–2023)

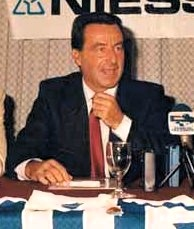

Personal information
- Full name: Iñaki Alkiza Laskibar
- Date of birth: 31 July 1933
- Place of birth: Herrera, Gipuzkoa, Spain
- Date of death: 16 May 2023 (aged 89)
- Place of death: San Sebastián, Spain
- Position: Forward

Senior career*
Years	Team	Apps	(Gls)
1955–1961	Real Sociedad	66	(9)
1956–1957	→ Eibar (loan)	28	(12)
Total		96	(21)
- * Club domestic league appearances and goals

Iñaki Alkiza Laskibar (31 July 1933 – 16 May 2023) was a Spanish footballer.

== Career ==
Born in Herrera, Gipuzkoa, Alkiza played as a forward for Real Sociedad and Eibar.

After retiring he later became a director and then the President of Real Sociedad, overseeing the club relaxing their rules on foreign players and also a stadium move.

== Personal life and death ==
His son Bittor was also a footballer.

Iñaki Alkiza died on 16 May 2023, at the age of 89.
