= Aitor Elizegi =

Spanish entrepreneur, chef and the president of football club Athletic Bilbao

32nd President of Athletic Bilbao
- In office 27 December 2018 – 24 June 2022
- Preceded by: Josu Urrutia
- Succeeded by: Jon Uriarte

Personal details
- Born: Aitor Elizegi Alberdi; 27 June 1966 (age 59) Bilbao, Spain
- Party: Basque Nationalist Party
- Profession: Entrepreneur, chef

Aitor Elizegi Alberdi (born 27 June 1966) is a Spanish entrepreneur, chef and the president of football club Athletic Bilbao from 2018 to 2022.

== Biography ==
Born in 1966, in Santutxu, Bilbao, Elizegi grew up supporting Athletic Bilbao, becoming a member of the club at the age of 25. Elizegi entered the culinary industry in 1987, winning the Spanish Chefs Championship a year later and the Basque Gastronomy Award in 2000 for best restaurateur at his Gaminiz restaurant. As of 2019, Elizegi is head of a number of Basque restaurants in Bilbao, including Txocook, Bascook and Basquery.

On 27 December 2018, Elizegi won Athletic Bilbao's presidential election to succeeding former incumbent Josu Urrutia, defeating Alberto Uribe-Echevarría, treasurer under Urrutia, by a margin of just 85 votes. (Note: Elizegi polled in at 9,264 votes (47.9%), from 19,340 voting members, against Uribe-Echevarría's 9,179 votes (47.46%). 781 (4.04%) members voted blank and 116 (0.6%) remaining votes were considered invalid.)

One of his first acts as president was to replace the long-serving sporting director José María Amorrortu with Rafael Alkorta and Andoni Ayarza, (both former players of the club), as promised in his election campaign.

He did not seek re-election at the end of his four-year term in 2022, with Jon Uriarte appointed to succeed him.

== Politics ==
Elizegi is a member of the Basque Nationalist Party. Elizegi is a Basque nationalist and independentist, and has expressed a desire for the admittance of a Basque national football team into UEFA.
