= 2001–02 Rayo Vallecano season =

Rayo Vallecano
2001–02 season
- President: Teresa Rivero
- Head coach: Andoni Goikoetxea (until 29 September); Gregorio Manzano
- Stadium: Campo de Fútbol de Vallecas
- La Liga: 11th
- Copa del Rey: Quarter-finals
- Top goalscorer: League: Elvir Bolić (11); All: Elvir Bolić (11)
- Average home league attendance: 11,061

The 2001–02 season was the 78th season in the history of Rayo Vallecano and the club's third consecutive season in the top flight of Spanish football. In addition to the domestic league, Rayo Vallecano participated in this season's edition of the Copa del Rey.

== Competitions ==
=== Overall record ===
Competition	First match	Last match	Starting round	Final position	Record							
Competition	First match	Last match	Starting round	Final position	Pld	W	D	L	GF	GA	GD	Win %
La Liga	26 August 2001	11 May 2002	Matchday 1	11th	38	13	10	15	46	52	−6	34.21
Copa del Rey	10 October 2001	16 January 2022	First round	Quarter-finals	6	4	1	1	8	6	+2	66.67
Total					44	17	11	16	54	58	−4	38.64

Source: BDFutbol

=== La Liga ===
==== League table ====
Pos	Team	Pld	W	D	L	GF	GA	GD	Pts	Qualification or relegation
9	Athletic Bilbao	38	14	11	13	54	66	−12	53 (Note: SEV: 7 pts → SEV 3–3 ATH; ATH: 7 pts → ATH 0–1 SEV; MLG: 3 pts)	
10	Málaga	38	13	14	11	44	44	0	53	Qualification for the Intertoto Cup third round
11	Rayo Vallecano	38	13	10	15	46	52	−6	49	
12	Valladolid	38	13	9	16	45	58	−13	48	
13	Real Sociedad	38	13	8	17	48	54	−6	47 (Note: ESP 1–2 RSO; RSO 1–0 ESP)	

Source: LFP
Rules for classification: 1st points; 2nd head-to-head points; 3rd head-to-head goal difference; 4th head-to-head goals scored; 5th goal difference; 6th number of goals scored; 7th Fair-play points

==== Results summary ====
Overall								Home						Away					
Pld	W	D	L	GF	GA	GD	Pts	W	D	L	GF	GA	GD	W	D	L	GF	GA	GD
38	13	10	15	46	52	−6	49	11	3	5	27	19	+8	2	7	10	19	33	−14

Source: BDFutbol

==== Results by round ====
Round	1	2	3	4	5	6	7	8	9	10	11	12	13	14	15	16	17	18	19	20	21	22	23	24	25	26	27	28	29	30	31	32	33	34	35	36	37	38
Ground	H	A	H	A	A	H	A	H	A	H	A	H	A	H	A	H	A	H	A	A	H	A	H	H	A	H	A	H	A	H	A	H	A	H	A	H	A	H
Result	L	D	L	L	L	L	L	W	L	W	L	W	L	L	L	D	D	W	D	D	W	L	W	D	L	W	D	L	D	W	D	D	L	W	W	W	W	W
Position																																						

Source: BDFutbol
A = Away; H = Home; W = Win; D = Draw; L = Loss

==== Matches ====
26 August 2001 1	Rayo Vallecano	1–2	Villarreal	Madrid
--:-- CEST (UTC+2)

9 September 2001 2	Barcelona	1–1	Rayo Vallecano	Barcelona
--:-- CEST (UTC+2)

16 September 2001 3	Rayo Vallecano	1–2	Zaragoza	Madrid
--:-- CEST (UTC+2)

23 September 2001 4	Sevilla	2–1	Rayo Vallecano	Seville
--:-- CEST (UTC+2)

29 September 2001 5	Espanyol	3–1	Rayo Vallecano	Barcelona
--:-- CEST (UTC+2)

3 October 2001 6	Rayo Vallecano	0–1	Osasuna	Madrid
--:-- CEST (UTC+2)

7 October 2001 7	Tenerife	3–1	Rayo Vallecano	Santa Cruz de Tenerife
--:-- CEST (UTC+2)

14 October 2001 8	Rayo Vallecano	2–1	Real Sociedad	Madrid
--:-- CEST (UTC+2)

21 October 2001 9	Mallorca	3–0	Rayo Vallecano	Palma
--:-- CEST (UTC+2)

27 October 2001 10	Rayo Vallecano	2–1	Deportivo La Coruña	Madrid
--:-- CEST (UTC+2)

4 November 2001 11	Valencia	2–1	Rayo Vallecano	Valencia
--:-- CEST (UTC+2)

11 November 2001 12	Rayo Vallecano	3–0	Málaga	Madrid
--:-- CEST (UTC+2)

18 November 2001 13	Real Betis	2–0	Rayo Vallecano	Seville
--:-- CEST (UTC+2)

25 November 2001 14	Rayo Vallecano	0–3	Real Madrid	Madrid
--:-- CEST (UTC+2)

2 December 2001 15	Valladolid	3–1	Rayo Vallecano	Valladolid
--:-- CEST (UTC+2)

9 December 2001 16	Rayo Vallecano	0–0	Las Palmas	Madrid
--:-- CEST (UTC+2)

16 December 2001 17	Athletic Bilbao	1–1	Rayo Vallecano	Bilbao
--:-- CEST (UTC+2)

5 January 2002 19	Celta Vigo	2–2	Rayo Vallecano	Vigo
--:-- CEST (UTC+2)

12 January 2002 20	Villarreal	1–1	Rayo Vallecano	Villarreal
--:-- CEST (UTC+2)

20 January 2002 21	Rayo Vallecano	2–1	Barcelona	Madrid
--:-- CEST (UTC+2)

23 January 2002 18	Rayo Vallecano	2–0	Alavés	Madrid
--:-- CEST (UTC+2)

27 January 2002 22	Zaragoza	3–2	Rayo Vallecano	Zaragoza
--:-- CEST (UTC+2)

2 February 2002 23	Rayo Vallecano	2–1	Sevilla	Madrid
--:-- CEST (UTC+2)

6 February 2002 24	Rayo Vallecano	2–2	Espanyol	Madrid
--:-- CEST (UTC+2)

10 February 2002 25	Osasuna	1–0	Rayo Vallecano	Pamplona
--:-- CEST (UTC+2)

17 February 2002 26	Rayo Vallecano	2–0	Tenerife	Madrid
--:-- CEST (UTC+2)

24 February 2002 27	Real Sociedad	2–2	Rayo Vallecano	San Sebastián
--:-- CEST (UTC+2)

3 March 2002 28	Rayo Vallecano	0–2	Mallorca	Madrid
--:-- CEST (UTC+2)

9 March 2002 29	Deportivo La Coruña	1–1	Rayo Vallecano	A Coruña
--:-- CEST (UTC+2)

17 March 2002 30	Rayo Vallecano	2–1	Valencia	Madrid
--:-- CEST (UTC+2)

23 March 2002 31	Málaga	0–0	Rayo Vallecano	Málaga
--:-- CEST (UTC+2)

31 March 2002 32	Rayo Vallecano	0–0	Real Betis	Madrid
--:-- CEST (UTC+2)

6 April 2002 33	Real Madrid	3–1	Rayo Vallecano	Madrid
--:-- CEST (UTC+2)

14 April 2002 34	Rayo Vallecano	1–0	Valladolid	Madrid
--:-- CEST (UTC+2)

20 April 2002 35	Las Palmas	0–2	Rayo Vallecano	Las Palmas
--:-- CEST (UTC+2)

28 April 2002 36	Rayo Vallecano	4–2	Athletic Bilbao	Madrid
--:-- CEST (UTC+2)

5 May 2002 37	Alavés	0–1	Rayo Vallecano	Vitoria-Gasteiz
--:-- CEST (UTC+2)

11 May 2002 38	Rayo Vallecano	1–0	Celta Vigo	Madrid
--:-- CEST (UTC+2)

=== Copa del Rey ===
10 October 2001 Round of 64	Atlético Madrid	1–3	Rayo Vallecano	Madrid
--:-- CEST (UTC+2)

28 November 2001 Round of 32	Albacete	1–3	Rayo Vallecano	Albacete
--:-- CEST (UTC+2)
