= Juanjo Valencia =

Spanish footballer

Personal information
- Full name: Juan José Valencia de la Serna
- Date of birth: 18 September 1971 (age 55)
- Place of birth: San Sebastián, Spain
- Height: 1.80 m (5 ft 11 in)
- Position: Goalkeeper

Youth career
- 1986–1990: Antiguoko
- 1990–1991: Athletic Bilbao

Senior career*
Years	Team	Apps	(Gls)
1991–1992	Bilbao Athletic	23	(0)
1991	→ Barakaldo (loan)	4	(0)
1992–1999	Athletic Bilbao	172	(0)
1999–2000	Sevilla	18	(0)
2000–2004	Sporting Gijón	118	(0)
2004–2006	Gimnàstic	38	(0)
2006	Racing Santander	1	(0)
Total		374	(0)

International career
1992–1994	Spain U21	15	(0)
1995	Basque Country	1	(0)
Medal record
Men's football
Representing Spain
UEFA European Under-21 Championship
Bronze medal – third place	1994 France
- * Club domestic league appearances and goals

Juan José 'Juanjo' Valencia de la Serna (born 18 September 1971) is a Spanish retired professional footballer who played as a goalkeeper.

He played 191 La Liga games over the course of nine seasons, in representation of Athletic Bilbao, Sevilla and Racing de Santander.

== Club career ==
=== Athletic Bilbao ===
Born in San Sebastián, Basque Country, Valencia joined Athletic Bilbao for his last year as a junior, being signed from neighbouring Antiguoko. He was loaned to Segunda División B club Barakaldo CF to start his senior career, but was quickly recalled to play for Athletic's reserves, helping them retain their place in Segunda División.

Valencia made an immediate impact at the first team at the age of 20, replacing the departing Patxi Iru. When Kike Burgos was injured in pre-season, manager Jupp Heynckes gave him a first La Liga start against Cádiz CF in the opening game of the 1992–93 season (Julen Guerrero made his debut in the same game). He only missed a combined eight league matches in his first four years, but subsequently began to be challenged by Imanol Etxeberria.

Valencia fell completely out of favour under Luis Fernández and, after 195 appearances in official competitions, signed with fellow league side Sevilla FC.

=== Later years ===
Sevilla began 1999–2000 with Valencia as their starting goalkeeper, but during the winter of what was to be a campaign ending with relegation in last place, Norway international goalkeeper Frode Olsen arrived and took the starting spot, so in April 2000 the former accepted an opportunity to move on to Sporting de Gijón in the second level to cover an injury crisis. He was first choice in the next three seasons, totalling 106 league games. In 2003–04 he was overtaken by the emerging Roberto, and eventually moved to fellow league club Gimnàstic de Tarragona.

Valencia was a regular in his first season in Catalonia – being ranked the second-best in the division – and played the first few games in the second, but from then on Álvaro Iglesias was preferred as they returned to the top flight after a 56-year wait, by which time the former had already moved on to Racing de Santander. During his brief tenure he played understudy to Dudu Aouate, his first appearance in the top tier after a hiatus of six years occurring on 13 May 2006 against Villarreal CF, following which he retired at the age of 34.

Afterwards, Valencia spent some time as a goalkeeping coach for Athletic Bilbao's youth teams, Xerez CD and SD Eibar.

== International career ==
Valencia was an important member of the Spain under-21 squad during his eligible years, making his debut at that level two days after his league bow. During his most impressive spell with Athletic he was in consideration for the senior team, but only managed one bench appearance in a friendly against Germany in February 1995.

Valencia took part in one match with the unofficial Basque Country team, in December 1995.

== Personal life ==
Valencia worked as a restaurateur in partnership with some former teammates, and was also an enthusiast of the racquet sport padel.

== Honours ==
Spain U21

- UEFA European Under-21 Championship third place: 1994
