= José María Amorrortu =

Spanish footballer and manager

Personal information
- Full name: José María Amorrortu Prieto
- Date of birth: 22 July 1953 (age 73)
- Place of birth: Bilbao, Spain
- Height: 1.80 m (5 ft 11 in)
- Position: Forward

Senior career*
Years	Team	Apps	(Gls)
1971–1972	Indautxu		
1972–1973	Getxo	?	(18)
1973–1978	Athletic Bilbao	99	(7)
1978–1983	Zaragoza	122	(17)
Total		221+	(42)

International career
1977	Spain U21	1	(0)

Managerial career
- 1983–1984: Balsas Picarral
- 1984: Zaragoza (youth)
- 1984–1985: Iturrigorri
- 1985–1987: Amorebieta
- 1987–1989: Barakaldo
- 1989–1990: Durango
- 1991–1992: Athletic Bilbao (youth)
- 1992–1994: Biscay
- 1994–1995: Bilbao Athletic
- 1995: Athletic Bilbao
- 2003–2004: Eibar
- 2004–2006: Real Sociedad
- * Club domestic league appearances and goals

José María Amorrortu Prieto (born 22 July 1953) is a Spanish former professional football forward and manager.

== Playing career ==
Born in Bilbao, Biscay, Amorrortu signed with Athletic Bilbao in the summer of 1973 from neighbouring amateurs CD Getxo. He went on to spend five seasons in La Liga with the former club, making his debut on 2 September 1973 in a 2–1 away loss against RC Celta de Vigo. He added 11 appearances in the runner-up run in the 1976–77 edition of the UEFA Cup, featuring in the 2–1 home win over Juventus FC in the second leg of the final.

After only 13 games in the 1977–78 campaign, totalling 127 in all competitions, Amorrortu signed with Real Zaragoza also in the top division. He scored a career-best (at the professional level) ten goals in his first year, but his team could only finish in 14th position; until his retirement in 1983, aged only 30, he competed solely in that tier.

== Managerial career ==
Amorrortu began working as a coach immediately after retiring, spending his first decade in the Segunda División B or lower and also working at youth level, notably with Athletic Bilbao where he was credited for bringing Fernando Llorente to the club. His first season in the professional leagues was 1994–95, when he was in charge of Bilbao Athletic in the Segunda División. Additionally, he had short spells as caretaker manager for their senior team in 1995 and 1996.

After leaving Athletic, Amorrortu became manager of SD Eibar also from the Basque Country (second tier), signing a two-year contract with Real Sociedad on 3 June 2004 and being fired in late January 2006. From 2006 until 2011, he acted as director of Atlético Madrid's academy before returning to the same role at Athletic Bilbao, departing at the end of 2018 when Aitor Elizegi was elected president and implemented personnel changes.

Amorrortu also spent time as coach of the unofficial Basque Country regional side, for which he also featured and scored as a player.

== Honours ==
=== Player ===
Athletic Bilbao

- Copa del Rey runner-up: 1976–77
- UEFA Cup runner-up: 1976–77

=== Manager ===
Barakaldo

- Tercera División: 1987–88
