= Rafael Alkorta =

Spanish footballer (born 1968)

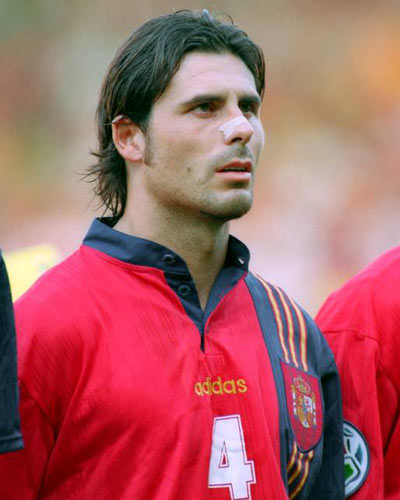
- Alkorta with Spain in 1996

Personal information
- Full name: Rafael Alkorta Martínez
- Date of birth: 16 September 1968 (age 58)
- Place of birth: Bilbao, Spain
- Height: 1.78 m (5 ft 10 in)
- Position: Centre-back

Youth career
- 1978–1985: Athletic Bilbao

Senior career*
Years	Team	Apps	(Gls)
1984–1987	Bilbao Athletic	44	(2)
1987–1993	Athletic Bilbao	172	(2)
1993–1997	Real Madrid	107	(2)
1997–2002	Athletic Bilbao	91	(4)
Total		414	(10)

International career
1985	Spain U16	7	(0)
1985–1986	Spain U18	3	(0)
1987–1990	Spain U21	6	(0)
1990–1998	Spain	54	(0)
1990–1999	Basque Country	5	(0)

Managerial career
- 2014–2015: Olympiacos (assistant)
- 2015–2016: Marseille (assistant)
- * Club domestic league appearances and goals

Rafael Alkorta Martínez (born 16 September 1968) is a Spanish former professional footballer who played mainly as a central defender. He is the current sporting director of Athletic Bilbao.

Having represented Athletic Bilbao and Real Madrid during a 17-year professional career, he amassed La Liga totals of 370 matches and eight goals, winning three trophies with the latter club.

Alkorta appeared in three World Cups with the Spain national team during the 1990s.

== Club career ==
Born in Bilbao, Biscay, Alkorta began playing as a child with local Athletic Club in 1978, and made his senior debut with the second team seven years later, making 44 Segunda División appearances before being promoted by Howard Kendall to the senior side for the 1987–88 season. His first La Liga match was a 1–0 away defeat against Real Valladolid on 24 October 1987, and he went on to feature in a further 171 while establishing himself as an outstanding man marker.

Alkorta attracted the attention of Real Madrid, for whom he signed in the 1993–94 campaign (he was reluctant to make the move, but was persuaded due to Athletic's poor financial situation which was improved by the 350 million pesetas transfer fee). During his spell at the Santiago Bernabéu Stadium, he formed a notable partnership with Fernando Hierro for club and country, and made 134 official appearances while winning two league titles.

Alkorta returned to Athletic in 1997–98, swapping teams with fellow defender Aitor Karanka. He helped the Basque side to finish second in the first campaign upon his return and went on to play regularly the following years but, after only six games in 2001–02, was released and decided to retire aged 33.

== International career ==
An international since 26 May 1990 (a 1–0 friendly away win over Yugoslavia), Alkorta earned 54 caps for Spain over the next eight years. He played in three FIFA World Cups – 1990, 1994 and 1998 – and UEFA Euro 1996, also representing the country at under-16, under-18 and under-21 levels.

In the first competition, in Italy, Alkorta played ten minutes in a 2–1 group stage victory against Belgium, starting in a further 11 matches and completing ten in the other senior tournaments.

== Coaching and administrative career ==
Alkorta worked as an assistant manager to former Real Madrid teammate Míchel at Olympiacos F.C. and Olympique de Marseille. In December 2018, following the election of Aitor Elizegi as the president of Athletic Bilbao, he was installed as the club's new sporting director, working with Andoni Ayarza and replacing the long-serving José María Amorrortu.

== Personal life ==
Alkorta's younger brother, Óscar, was also a footballer who was a midfielder. A fellow Athletic Bilbao youth graduate (alongside José Félix Guerrero who also had a more famous sibling in the first team), the younger Alkorta never made it past the reserves and played out his career in the Segunda División B. The brothers were on the staff at Athletic together for a few months in 1997, between Rafael's return from Madrid and Óscar's move to CD Aurrerá de Vitoria. Óscar later worked as a youth coach at Athletic Bilbao, working under his older sibling from 2019.

Rafael's son Iker received some media attention for modelling work in 2017.

== Honours ==
Real Madrid

- La Liga: 1994–95, 1996–97
- Supercopa de España: 1993; runner-up: 1995
