= Iñigo Larrainzar =

Spanish footballer

Personal information
- Full name: Iñigo Larrainzar Santamaría
- Date of birth: 5 June 1971 (age 55)
- Place of birth: Pamplona, Spain
- Height: 1.73 m (5 ft 8 in)
- Position: Right-back

Youth career
- Osasuna

Senior career*
Years	Team	Apps	(Gls)
1989–1990	Osasuna B	20	(2)
1990–1993	Osasuna	115	(9)
1993–2003	Athletic Bilbao	251	(6)
2003–2005	Córdoba	40	(0)
Total		426	(17)

International career
1990	Spain U20	1	(0)
1991	Spain U21	5	(0)
1991–1992	Spain U23	4	(0)
1994	Spain	1	(0)
1995–2000	Basque Country	4	(0)
2003	Navarre	1	(0)
- * Club domestic league appearances and goals

Iñigo Larrainzar Santamaría (born 5 June 1971) is a Spanish former professional footballer who played mainly as a right-back.

Also a central defender on occasion, his older brother Domingo, often referred to as Larrainzar I, was also a footballer, and both played at Osasuna.

== Club career ==
A product of hometown CA Osasuna's youth academy and reserve team, where he played alongside future Athletic Bilbao teammate José Mari, Pamplona-born Larrainzar made his first-team – and La Liga – debut on 21 March 1990 in a 1–0 away loss to Rayo Vallecano, and was definitely promoted to the main squad for the following season; aged 19, he was instrumental, as was brother Domingo, in helping the Navarrese side to finish fourth and qualify for the UEFA Cup.

In the summer of 1993, Athletic Bilbao paid 200 million pesetas to acquire Larrainzar's services, then the second-highest figure by the club, and he was an undisputed starter in the following campaigns. In 1997–98, alongside youth graduate Aitor Larrazábal who played on the opposite flank, he featured in 34 matches and scored two goals to help the Basques to a runner-up place, with direct qualification for the UEFA Champions League.

After some years battling for first-choice status with younger Jesús María Lacruz, who also represented Osasuna (although they did not coincide), and also dealing with injuries, Larraínzar moved south for Córdoba CF in the Segunda División, where he played a further two seasons. He retired at the age of 34, with 366 top-flight appearances to his credit.

== International career ==
Larrainzar was capped once for Spain. On 19 January 1994, he played the entire 2–2 friendly against Portugal in Vigo.
