= Bittor Alkiza =

Spanish footballer (born 1970)

Personal information
- Full name: Bittor Alkiza Fernández
- Date of birth: 26 October 1970 (age 55)
- Place of birth: San Sebastián, Spain
- Height: 1.69 m (5 ft 7 in)
- Position: Midfielder

Youth career
- Real Sociedad

Senior career*
Years	Team	Apps	(Gls)
1989–1991	San Sebastián	60	(10)
1991–1994	Real Sociedad	92	(11)
1994–2003	Athletic Bilbao	287	(8)
2003–2005	Real Sociedad	38	(0)
Total		477	(29)

International career
1990	Spain U19	3	(1)
1990	Spain U20	1	(0)
1998	Spain	3	(1)
1993–2002	Basque Country	9	(0)

Managerial career
- 2013–2014: Real Sociedad (assistant)
- 2015–2018: Numancia (assistant)
- 2018–2024: Osasuna (assistant)
- 2024–2026: Mallorca (assistant)
- * Club domestic league appearances and goals

Bittor Alkiza Fernández (born 26 October 1970) is a Spanish former professional footballer who played for both Real Sociedad and Athletic Bilbao as a midfielder.

He amassed La Liga totals of 417 games and 19 goals over 14 seasons, and was also a Spain international in the late 90s.

== Club career ==
Born in San Sebastián, Gipuzkoa, Alkiza made his professional debut with local giants Real Sociedad, being promoted to the first team at only 20 and making 105 official appearances in his first three seasons. After an aborted transfer to Real Madrid, he eventually moved to Basque neighbours Athletic Bilbao in 1994, for 220 million pesetas.

Alkiza was also first choice at the San Mamés Stadium, not scoring so often as the attacking duties in midfield were more often than not the task of future club great Julen Guerrero. In the 1997–98 campaign, he only missed one La Liga game – 3,146 minutes of action – as the side finished in second place and qualified for the UEFA Champions League. In the latter competition, even though Athletic ranked last in their group, they did draw 0–0 at home against Juventus, the finalists of the previous three editions, with him playing the full 90 minutes.

In summer 2003, after 328 competitive matches, Alkiza returned to Real Sociedad who were due taking part in the season's Champions League. At 33, his debut campaign was satisfactory, but he eventually retired from the game after not being able to heal a degenerative injury from early seasons.

Alkiza later rejoined his last professional club, being charged with Real Sociedad's youth teams. He later worked as assistant to Jagoba Arrasate at that side, Numancia, Osasuna and Mallorca.

== International career ==
Alkiza played three times for Spain in a two-month span. His debut came on 23 September 1998 in a friendly with Russia in Granada: he scored the match's only goal, netting from outside the area.

=== International goal ===
Score and result list Spain's goal tally first, score column indicates score after Alkiza goal.

International goal scored by Bittor Alkiza
No.	Date	Venue	Opponent	Score	Result	Competition
1	23 September 1998	Los Cármenes, Granada, Spain	Russia	1–0	1–0	Friendly

== Style of play ==
Although his natural position was that of left midfielder, Alkiza could also be deployed as a central one. Coach Javier Irureta, who managed him at Athletic in 1994–95, said of the player: "I guarantee that if you pass him the ball he will not return a melon".

== Personal life ==
Alkiza's father, Iñaki, also played for some years with Real Sociedad, later serving as the club's president. He was also a relatively important local politician.

He broke the "curse" that stated that players from Real would never succeed at Athletic (Loren, Luciano Iturrino or David Villabona).

== See also ==
- List of Athletic Bilbao players (+200 appearances)
- List of La Liga players (400+ appearances)
