= Iñaki Lafuente =

Spanish footballer

Personal information
- Full name: Iñaki Lafuente Sancha
- Date of birth: 24 January 1976 (age 50)
- Place of birth: Barakaldo, Spain
- Height: 1.86 m (6 ft 1 in)
- Position: Goalkeeper

Youth career
- 1992–1993: Retuerto
- 1993–1995: Athletic Bilbao

Senior career*
Years	Team	Apps	(Gls)
1995–1999	Bilbao Athletic	65	(0)
1995	→ Getxo (loan)		
1996	→ Sestao (loan)	20	(0)
1998–1999	→ Elche (loan)	37	(0)
1999–2009	Athletic Bilbao	128	(0)
2007–2008	→ Espanyol (loan)	5	(0)
2009	→ Sporting Gijón (loan)	13	(0)
2009–2011	Numancia	25	(0)
Total		293	(0)

International career
2006–2007	Basque Country	3	(0)
- * Club domestic league appearances and goals

Iñaki Lafuente Sancha (born 24 January 1976) is a Spanish former professional footballer who played as a goalkeeper.

He appeared in 146 La Liga games in ten seasons, mainly with Athletic Bilbao. He also represented Espanyol and Sporting de Gijón in the competition.

== Club career ==
Born in Barakaldo, Biscay, Lafuente was a graduate of Lezama, the famed Athletic Bilbao youth academy. He made his debut with the first team in 1999–2000 after serving two loans at modest Basque neighbours, adding another with Elche CF three years later. Having replaced Imanol Etxeberria, he competed with Dani Aranzubia for first-choice status in several La Liga seasons, appearing in 36 games in 2000–01 and adding 30 the following campaign.

For 2007–08, Lafuente was loaned to RCD Espanyol as Gorka Iraizoz was sold in the opposite direction. He backed up Carlos Kameni at his new club, and when the Cameroonian left for the 2008 Africa Cup of Nations he became the starter, but retired injured in just his second appearance.

In July 2008, Lafuente returned to Athletic Bilbao, being only third-choice. On 13 January 2009, due to Sporting de Gijón starter Iván Cuéllar's serious ankle injury, coincidentally in a match against the former, he was loaned to the Asturias side until the end of the campaign. In his first start, on the 25th, they were beaten 5–1 at Getafe CF.

Lafuente was released by Athletic in the summer of 2009, ending a 16-year relationship. In late July, the 33-year-old moved to CD Numancia (recently relegated to the Segunda División), being used mostly as a backup during his two-year spell and retiring subsequently.

== Career statistics ==
Appearances and goals by club, season and competition
Club	Season	League			Cup		Europe		Other		Total	
Club	Season	Division	Apps	Goals	Apps	Goals	Apps	Goals	Apps	Goals	Apps	Goals
Bilbao Athletic	1994–95	Segunda División	1	0	—		—		—		1	0
Bilbao Athletic	1996–97	Segunda División B	27	0	—		—		—		27	0
Bilbao Athletic	1997–98	Segunda División B	33	0	—		—		4	0	37	0
Bilbao Athletic	1999–2000	Segunda División B	4	0	—		—		—		4	0
Bilbao Athletic	Total		65	0	—		—		4	0	69	0
Sestao (loan)	1995–96	Segunda División	20	0	0	0	—		—		20	0
Elche (loan)	1998–99	Segunda División B	37	0	0	0	—		6	0	43	0
Athletic Bilbao	1999–2000	La Liga	14	0	4	0	—		—		18	0
Athletic Bilbao	2000–01	La Liga	36	0	0	0	—		—		36	0
Athletic Bilbao	2001–02	La Liga	30	0	0	0	—		—		30	0
Athletic Bilbao	2002–03	La Liga	13	0	0	0	—		—		13	0
Athletic Bilbao	2003–04	La Liga	4	0	1	0	—		—		5	0
Athletic Bilbao	2004–05	La Liga	0	0	8	0	4	0	—		12	0
Athletic Bilbao	2005–06	La Liga	20	0	2	0	2	0	—		24	0
Athletic Bilbao	2006–07	La Liga	11	0	2	0	—		—		13	0
Athletic Bilbao	2008–09	La Liga	0	0	0	0	—		—		0	0
Athletic Bilbao	Total		128	0	17	0	6	0	—		151	0
Espanyol (loan)	2007–08	La Liga	5	0	4	0	—		—		9	0
Sporting Gijón (loan)	2008–09	La Liga	13	0	0	0	—		—		13	0
Numancia	2009–10	Segunda División	6	0	1	0	—		—		7	0
Numancia	2010–11	Segunda División	19	0	0	0	—		—		19	0
Numancia	Total		25	0	1	0	—		—		26	0
Career total			293	0	22	0	6	0	10	0	331	0
