= Javi González (footballer, born 1974) =

Spanish footballer

Personal information
- Full name: Javier González Gómez
- Date of birth: 22 March 1974 (age 52)
- Place of birth: Barakaldo, Spain
- Height: 1.80 m (5 ft 11 in)
- Position: Midfielder

Youth career
- 1986–1993: Athletic Bilbao

Senior career*
Years	Team	Apps	(Gls)
1993–1994	Bilbao Athletic	15	(0)
1994–1995	Alavés	5	(0)
1995–1996	Sestao	30	(8)
1996–1997	Celta	24	(1)
1997–2007	Athletic Bilbao	220	(9)
2006	→ Ashdod (loan)	11	(0)
2007–2009	Hércules	12	(0)
2009–2011	Portugalete	2	(0)
Total		319	(18)
- * Club domestic league appearances and goals

Javier 'Javi' González Gómez (born 22 March 1974) is a Spanish former professional footballer. Mainly a midfielder, he could operate on either side of the pitch.

He spent most of his career with Athletic Bilbao, playing 254 competitive matches in ten La Liga seasons.

== Club career ==
González was born in Barakaldo, Biscay. After growing through the ranks of Athletic Bilbao, he played one season each with Basque neighbours Deportivo Alavés (Segunda División B) and Sestao Sport Club (Segunda División, relegated).

In 1997–98, after one year with fellow La Liga club RC Celta de Vigo, González returned to the San Mamés Stadium as a full member of the main squad, scoring five goals in 30 games as Athletic finished second and qualified for the UEFA Champions League. He even featured occasionally as an attacking right-back.

After a serious knee injury in late 2004, González's role gradually diminished; he totalled only 26 league matches in three seasons. He also served a six-month loan at Israeli Premier League side F.C. Ashdod, where his former Celta teammate Haim Revivo worked as director of football.

González signed for second-tier Hércules CF in July 2007, appearing sparingly in his first season due to problems with head coach Andoni Goikoetxea. In the next, in which the Alicante team finished fourth, he was left without a squad number by manager Juan Carlos Mandiá.

Aged 35, González joined lowly Club Portugalete, thus returning to his native region. He retired in 2011 after two seasons in the Tercera División.
