= Josu Urrutia =

Spanish former footballer (born 1968)

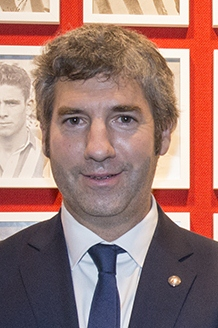
- Urrutia in 2014

Personal information
- Full name: Josu Urrutia Tellería
- Date of birth: 10 April 1968 (age 58)
- Place of birth: Bilbao, Spain
- Height: 1.76 m (5 ft 9 1/2 in)
- Position: Defensive midfielder

Youth career
- 1977–1986: Athletic Bilbao

Senior career*
Years	Team	Apps	(Gls)
1984–1990	Bilbao Athletic	109	(13)
1988–2003	Athletic Bilbao	348	(10)
Total		457	(23)

International career
1990–2001	Basque Country	6	(2)
- * Club domestic league appearances and goals

Josu Urrutia Tellería (born 10 April 1968) is a Spanish former professional footballer who played as a defensive midfielder.

His 17-year senior career was solely connected with Athletic Bilbao for which he appeared in 348 La Liga matches over 16 seasons, scoring ten goals. He later served a seven-year term as president of the club.

== Playing career ==
Urrutia was born in Bilbao, Biscay, and was a product of the youth academy of Athletic Bilbao based at Lezama. He made his first appearance with the club's B side on 9 September 1984, aged only 16, due to a strike by the professional players, and lasted 67 minutes in a 3–1 home win over UD Salamanca in the Segunda División.

Urrutia appeared once for the first team during the 1987–88 season, playing the full 90 minutes in a 1–1 home draw against Sporting de Gijón, then took part in a further five La Liga games in the next while also experiencing a relegation followed by a promotion with the reserves. He began 1989–90 still registered with the latter but eventually broke into the former, scoring his first goal for them on 1 April 1990 to help to a 2–2 home draw with Real Valladolid which was played at neighbouring Real Sociedad's ground, Atotxa Stadium.

From the 1990–91 campaign onwards, Urrutia became a very important first-team member, being a valuable midfield element with tackling and stamina skills and a perfect complement for the more attacking Julen Guerrero. He appeared in 30 matches during 1997–98, as the Basques qualified for the UEFA Champions League as runners-up.

After just 25 total appearances from 2001 to 2003 – he only played one Copa del Rey game in the latter season – Urrutia retired at the age of 35 due to recurrent problems in his right knee, having taken part in 401 official matches.

== Presidency ==
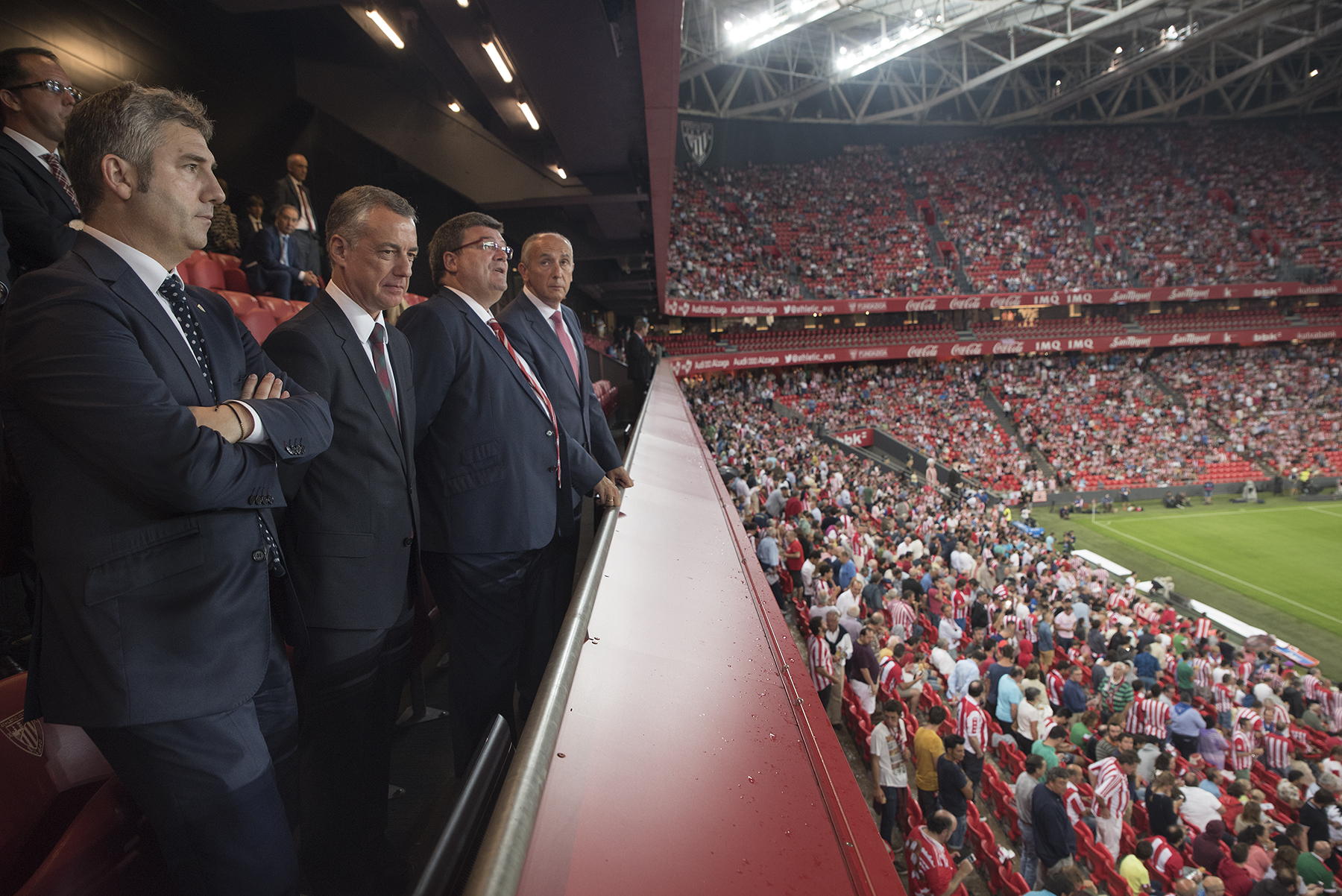
Urrutia (far left) in the directors' box at San Mamés alongside Iñigo Urkullu (Lehendakari of the Basque Community), 2016

On 7 July 2011, Urrutia won the presidential elections at his only club (54,36% of the votes), becoming only the fourth former player to be chosen for the post. He promised to bring in Marcelo Bielsa as head coach if he was elected, and this eventually came to fruition.

In March 2015, Urrutia was re-elected to serve another four-year term after being the only candidate to stand. In the early days of his tenure he had appointed former teammate José Ángel Ziganda to become the coach of the reserves, and six years later, still under the former's presidency, the latter was promoted to first-team duties; he replaced another playing colleague of both men, Ernesto Valverde.

In November 2018, Urrutia confirmed he would stand down as the president of Athletic Bilbao. During a spell heading an 'interim board' until his successor was elected, one of his final acts was to dismiss head coach Eduardo Berizzo – only appointed a few months earlier in place of Ziganda – due to poor results (again it was the reserve coach, this time Gaizka Garitano, who was invited to step into the role). On 27 December, new presidential elections were held, in which Aitor Elizegi won.

== See also ==
- List of one-club men
