= Mikel Lasa =

Spanish football player and manager

Personal information
- Full name: Mikel Lasa Goikoetxea
- Date of birth: 9 September 1971 (age 55)
- Place of birth: Legorreta, Spain
- Height: 1.74 m (5 ft 9 in)
- Position: Left-back

Youth career
- Real Sociedad

Senior career*
Years	Team	Apps	(Gls)
1988–1989	Real Sociedad B	17	(3)
1989–1991	Real Sociedad	77	(2)
1991–1997	Real Madrid	139	(3)
1997–2001	Athletic Bilbao	51	(1)
2001–2003	Murcia	49	(0)
2003–2004	Ciudad Murcia	19	(0)
Total		352	(9)

International career
1987–1988	Spain U16	11	(3)
1988	Spain U17	1	(0)
1989	Spain U18	4	(1)
1988–1989	Spain U19	4	(0)
1989–1990	Spain U20	4	(0)
1990–1994	Spain U21	17	(0)
1991–1992	Spain U23	13	(1)
1993	Spain	2	(0)
1993–1997	Basque Country	3	(0)

Managerial career
- 2021–2022: Futuro Kings
- * Club domestic league appearances and goals

Olympic medal record

Representing Spain

Men's Football
Gold medal – first place	1992 Barcelona	Team competition

UEFA European Under-21 Championship
Bronze medal – third place	1994 France	

Mikel Lasa Goikoetxea (born 9 September 1971) is a Spanish former professional footballer who played as a left-back.

He played 267 La Liga matches over 13 seasons (six goals scored), representing Real Sociedad, Real Madrid and Athletic Bilbao.

Lasa was part of the squad that won the Olympic gold medal in 1992. After retiring, he worked briefly as a manager.

== Club career ==
Lasa was born in the small town of Legorreta, Gipuzkoa. He was a product of local Real Sociedad's youth academy, and made his La Liga debut not yet aged 18, as the Basque side was coached by John Toshack, during the 1988–89 season.

Subsequently, Lasa signed with Real Madrid for the 1991–92 campaign for approximately €1.7 million, seen as a replacement for the ageing Rafael Gordillo. After struggling initially, barred by Francisco Villarroya, he eventually became the starter, also scoring in the club's 2–0 win in the 1993 Copa del Rey final against Real Zaragoza; however, he would be virtually absent from the lineups following the signing of Brazilian Roberto Carlos in summer 1996.

Lasa joined Real Sociedad's neighbours, Athletic Bilbao, in 1997–98, being an important first-team player as they achieved a runner-up place. He played very little in his final three seasons, and retired in 2004 following Segunda División spells with neighbours Real and Ciudad de Murcia.

Lasa started his managerial career in December 2021, taking charge of Futuro Kings FC in the Equatoguinean Primera División.

== International career ==
Lasa played twice for Spain in 1993, incidentally both matches being against Lithuania during the 1994 FIFA World Cup qualifiers. He was also a member of the side that won the gold medal at the 1992 Summer Olympics in Barcelona.

== Honours ==
Real Madrid

- La Liga: 1994–95, 1996–97
- Copa del Rey: 1992–93
- Supercopa de España: 1993

Murcia

- Segunda División: 2002–03

Spain U16

- UEFA European Under-16 Championship: 1988

Spain U23

- Summer Olympic Games: 1992

Spain U21

- UEFA European Under-21 Championship third place: 1994
