= Joseba Etxeberria =

Spanish football manager (born 1977)

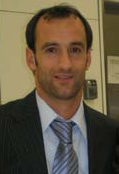
- Etxeberria in 2009

Personal information
- Full name: Joseba Andoni Etxeberria Lizardi
- Date of birth: 5 September 1977 (age 49)
- Place of birth: Elgoibar, Spain
- Height: 1.78 m (5 ft 10 in)
- Positions: Winger; forward

Team information
- Current team: Albacete (manager)

Youth career
- 1987–1990: Elgoibar
- 1990–1994: Real Sociedad

Senior career*
Years	Team	Apps	(Gls)
1994–1995	Real Sociedad B	29	(9)
1995	Real Sociedad	7	(2)
1995–2010	Athletic Bilbao	445	(88)
Total		481	(99)

International career
1992–1994	Spain U16	17	(11)
1994–1995	Spain U18	7	(5)
1995	Spain U20	6	(7)
1996–1997	Spain U21	3	(0)
1997–2004	Spain	53	(12)
1998–2007	Basque Country	11	(2)

Managerial career
- 2012–2015: Athletic Bilbao (youth)
- 2016–2017: Basconia
- 2017–2018: Amorebieta
- 2018: Tenerife
- 2019–2021: Athletic Bilbao B
- 2022–2023: Mirandés
- 2023–2025: Eibar
- 2025: Murcia
- 2026–: Albacete
- * Club domestic league appearances and goals

Joseba Andoni Etxeberria Lizardi (born 5 September 1977) is a Spanish former professional footballer who played mostly as a winger. He is currently manager of Segunda División club Albacete.

After starting his career at the age of 17 with Real Sociedad, he quickly switched to Athletic Bilbao, going on to spend the rest of his extensive career there.

Exteberria earned 53 caps for Spain, representing the nation at the 1998 World Cup and two European Championships.

== Club career ==
Etxeberria with Athletic Bilbao in 1995

Born in Elgoibar, Gipuzkoa, Etxeberria began his career with Real Sociedad, making his La Liga debut at only 17 in a 2–0 home win against Español on 29 January 1995. That summer, he moved to neighbouring Athletic Bilbao in a controversial transfer that cost over €3 million and caused the clubs to break off formal relations– at the time, it was the highest transfer fee paid for an under-18 player in Spanish football. When he returned to Anoeta Stadium in 2001, the Real Sociedad supporters prepared banners of his face on banknotes denoting him as a 'mercenary', and when he scored they responded with a hail of bottles and verbal abuse which earned the organization a fine from the Royal Spanish Football Federation.

In 1997–98, Etxeberria scored 11 league goals as Athletic finished second, achieving a career-best 14 five seasons later. He netted the goal that took his team into the group stage of the UEFA Champions League as they overcame Dinamo Tbilisi on the away goals rule, and repeated the feat in that phase of the competition against Rosenborg (1–1 home draw); in his first 12 years he never appeared in less than 28 league games, his lowest scoring output being three in the 2004–05 and 2006–07 campaigns, while he was also eventually awarded team captaincy.

On 1 October 2008, already playing second-fiddle, Etxeberria agreed a deal with the Basque side according to which he effectively played 2009–10, his last season as a professional, for free, after his contract expired in June 2009.

Etxeberria's last year was not a successful one individually as he only appeared in seven league matches, adding another seven with two goals in the season's UEFA Europa League, including his final for the club (a late penalty equaliser) against Nacional in the group phase of the UEFA Europa League on 5 November 2009. On 15 May 2010, he was replaced to a standing ovation in Athletic's 2–0 home victory over Deportivo de La Coruña, and represented his main club in 514 official matches (104 goals), third-best in its history only behind José Ángel Iribar and Txetxu Rojo.

Etxeberria's testimonial match at the San Mamés Stadium was played against 200 children, and he scored twice in a 5–3 win.

== International career ==
After leading the 1995 FIFA World Youth Championship scoring charts and winning fourth place, Etxeberria was called up to the Spain full national team, making his debut on 19 November 1997 in a friendly against Romania in Palma de Mallorca and scoring in the 1–1 draw. He was capped 53 times and netted 12 goals, representing his country at the 1998 FIFA World Cup, UEFA Euro 2000 and Euro 2004. On 18 June, in the second tournament, he scored the 2–1 winner in the group stage match to defeat Slovenia.

Etxeberria also featured for the unofficial Basque Country side in 11 matches, a record number of appearances at the time which was honoured by the territorial federation upon his retirement.

== Coaching career ==
Etxeberria began a coaching career after retiring, his first job being with the Basque Country representative youth teams. He returned to Athletic in 2012, starting out at the youth academy; having spent so many years at the club as a player, he described the Lezama training centre as a "second home".

In 2015, Etxeberria moved to the first team under manager Ernesto Valverde. The following year, he was appointed at affiliate Basconia, controlling a group of players he had previously managed at the Juvenil age group level.

In summer 2017, Etxberria departed from the Athletic internal structure whilst remaining contracted to the club and moved within the same region to become manager of third-tier side Amorebieta, replacing the departed Aitor Larrazábal (a former Athletic teammate and coaching colleague). On 5 February of the following year, he replaced fired José Luis Martí at Tenerife.

In May 2018, Athletic Bilbao confirmed that Etxeberria had cut all ties with the club to continue his coaching career independently. On 17 September, he was fired by Tenerife after the team failed to record a victory in the first five league matches of the season.

Etxeberria returned to the Athletic Bilbao staff in late May 2019, now as head coach of the reserve team Bilbao Athletic, on a two-year contract. On 14 February 2022, he took over from Lolo Escobar at the helm of Mirandés in the Segunda División.

On 24 May 2023, Etxeberria announced that he would leave the Jabatos at the end of the campaign. On 14 June, he replaced Gaizka Garitano as manager of fellow second division side Eibar.

On 16 February 2025, Etxeberria was dismissed after five games without a win and a 17th place in the league; in the process, he became the first coach to be shown the door by the club in 15 years. On 3 July, he was appointed at Primera Federación's Real Murcia on a one-year deal, but was relieved of his duties on 28 October with his team in last position of their group.

Etxeberria took over at Albacete on 4 October 2026.

== Personal life ==
Etxeberria was not related to former Athletic teammate Imanol Etxeberria. Coincidentally, they were raised just a few miles from one another (Imanol hailed from Bergara).

== Career statistics ==
=== Club ===
Appearances and goals by club, season and competition
Club	Season	League			Cup		Europe		Other (Note: Appearances in Supercopa de España, UEFA Super Cup, FIFA Club World Cup)		Total	
Club	Season	Division	Apps	Goals	Apps	Goals	Apps	Goals	Apps	Goals	Apps	Goals
Real Sociedad B	1993–94	Segunda División B	1	0	–		–		–		1	0
Real Sociedad B	1994–95	Segunda División B	28	9	–		–		–		28	9
Real Sociedad B	Total		29	9	0	0	0	0	0	0	29	9
Real Sociedad	1994–95	La Liga	7	2	1	0	–		–		8	2
Athletic Bilbao	1995–96	La Liga	33	7	6	3	–		–		39	10
Athletic Bilbao	1996–97	La Liga	35	6	1	0	–		–		36	6
Athletic Bilbao	1997–98	La Liga	36	11	4	2	3	0	–		43	13
Athletic Bilbao	1998–99	La Liga	36	5	2	1	8	2	–		46	8
Athletic Bilbao	1999–00	La Liga	35	10	2	2	–		–		37	12
Athletic Bilbao	2000–01	La Liga	28	5	3	0	–		–		31	5
Athletic Bilbao	2001–02	La Liga	31	8	6	1	–		–		37	9
Athletic Bilbao	2002–03	La Liga	33	14	0	0	–		–		33	14
Athletic Bilbao	2003–04	La Liga	34	6	1	0	–		–		35	6
Athletic Bilbao	2004–05	La Liga	33	3	7	1	8	2	–		48	6
Athletic Bilbao	2005–06	La Liga	29	4	2	0	–		–		31	4
Athletic Bilbao	2006–07	La Liga	28	3	2	0	–		–		30	3
Athletic Bilbao	2007–08	La Liga	25	4	0	0	–		–		25	4
Athletic Bilbao	2008–09	La Liga	22	2	3	0	–		–		25	2
Athletic Bilbao	2009–10	La Liga	7	0	2	0	7	2	2	0	18	2
Athletic Bilbao	Total		445	88	41	10	26	6	2	0	514	104
Career total			481	99	42	10	26	6	2	0	551	115

=== International ===
Appearances and goals by national team and year
National team	Year	Apps	Goals
Spain	1997	1	1
Spain	1998	10	2
Spain	1999	10	3
Spain	2000	11	2
Spain	2001	4	0
Spain	2002	1	0
Spain	2003	10	3
Spain	2004	6	1
Total		53	12

Scores and results list Spaon's goal tally first, score column indicates score after each Etxeberria goal.

List of international goals scored by Joseba Etxeberria
No.	Date	Venue	Opponent	Score	Result	Competition
1	19 November 1997	Lluís Sitjar, Palma, Spain	Romania	1–0	1–1	Friendly
2	25 March 1998	Balaídos, Vigo, Spain	Sweden	4–0	4–0	Friendly
3	14 October 1998	Ramat Gan Stadium, Ramat Gan, Israel	Israel	2–1	2–1	Euro 2000 qualifying
4	31 March 1999	Olimpico, Serravalle, San Marino	San Marino	6–0	6–0	Euro 2000 qualifying
5	5 June 1999	El Madrigal, Villarreal, Spain	San Marino	3–0	9–0	Euro 2000 qualifying
6	5 June 1999	El Madrigal, Villarreal, Spain	San Marino	4–0	9–0	Euro 2000 qualifying
7	18 June 2000	Amsterdam Arena, Amsterdam, Netherlands	Slovenia	2–1	2–1	UEFA Euro 2000
8	2 September 2000	Koševo, Sarajevo, Bosnia and Herzegovina	Bosnia and Herzegovina	2–1	2–1	2002 World Cup qualification
9	29 March 2003	Olimpiyskyi, Kyiv, Ukraine	Ukraine	2–1	2–2	Euro 2004 qualifying
10	6 November 2003	D. Afonso Henriques, Guimarães, Portugal	Portugal	1–0	3–0	Friendly
11	19 November 2003	Ullevaal, Oslo, Norway	Norway	3–0	3–0	Euro 2004 qualifying
12	18 February 2004	Lluís Companys, Barcelona, Spain	Peru	1–1	2–1	Friendly

== Managerial statistics ==
As of 22 November 2026

Managerial record by team and tenure
Team	Nat	From	To	Record								Ref
Team	Nat	From	To	G	W	D	L	GF	GA	GD	Win %	Ref
Basconia	(Spain)	29 June 2016	5 June 2017	38	12	12	14	50	55	−5	31.58	
Amorebieta	(Spain)	5 June 2017	5 February 2018	24	7	9	8	29	25	+4	29.17	
Tenerife	(Spain)	5 February 2018	17 September 2018	23	8	8	7	33	28	+5	34.78	
Athletic Bilbao B	(Spain)	28 May 2019	26 May 2021	57	30	14	13	104	63	+41	52.63	
Mirandés	(Spain)	14 February 2022	27 May 2023	59	21	14	24	74	75	−1	35.59	
Eibar	(Spain)	14 June 2023	16 February 2025	75	31	16	28	101	84	+17	41.33	
Murcia	(Spain)	3 July 2025	28 October 2025	9	1	4	4	6	10	−4	11.11	
Albacete	(Spain)	4 October 2026	Present	8	5	0	3	12	10	+2	62.50	
Career total				293	115	77	101	409	350	+59	39.25	—

== See also ==
- List of Athletic Bilbao players (+200 appearances)
- List of La Liga players (400+ appearances)
