= José Mari (footballer, born 1971) =

Spanish footballer

Personal information
- Full name: José María García Lafuente
- Date of birth: 10 February 1971 (age 55)
- Place of birth: Logroño, Spain
- Height: 1.80 m (5 ft 11 in)
- Position: Midfielder

Youth career
- 1984–1989: Osasuna

Senior career*
Years	Team	Apps	(Gls)
1989–1991	Osasuna B	57	(5)
1991–1995	Osasuna	70	(3)
1995	Barcelona	12	(0)
1995–1996	Betis	22	(0)
1996–2000	Athletic Bilbao	68	(5)
2000–2001	Leganés	28	(0)
2001–2002	Burgos	31	(2)
2002–2003	Reus	8	(1)
Total		296	(16)

International career
1987	Spain U16	5	(0)
1988	Spain U18	2	(0)
1989–1990	Spain U19	4	(0)
1990	Spain U20	1	(0)

Managerial career
- 2011–2012: Betis B (assistant)
- 2018–2019: Extremadura (assistant)
- * Club domestic league appearances and goals

José María García Lafuente (born 10 February 1971), commonly known as José Mari, is a Spanish former professional footballer who played as a midfielder.

He scored eight La Liga goals in ten seasons, whilst appearing in 158 matches with Osasuna, Barcelona, Betis and Athletic Bilbao during that timeframe.

== Playing career ==
=== Osasuna ===
Born in Logroño, La Rioja, José Mari was trained in the youth system of CA Osasuna and began his senior career with the reserves in the Segunda División B, his first match taking place towards the end of 1988–89. He spent another two seasons at that level, but also made his La Liga debut for the first team under manager Pedro María Zabalza, coming on as a late substitute in a 3–0 home win over Real Betis just prior to his 20th birthday.

José Mari began 1991–92 with the B side, but by October he was part of the main squad. At the end of the campaign he had started four league games and appeared from the bench in another four, and also made his European bow on 22 October 1991 when he played the last eight minutes in place of Miguel Sola in a 0–0 home draw against VfB Stuttgart.

José Mari was confirmed as a first-team member for 1992–93, featuring in 20 matches (although he only played 90 minutes seven times) and scoring his first goal in a 1–3 home loss to RCD Español. He was even more prominent the next season, but broke his ankle in March 1994 and Osasuna were eventually relegated in last place.

=== Barcelona ===
José Mari initially remained in Pamplona and competed in the Segunda División until January 1995, when he was signed by FC Barcelona for 150 million pesetas (equivalent to around GB£720,000 at the time) and returned to the top division on a three-year contract. He later stated that the move had been close to completion the previous year, but his serious injury led to its delay.

Once at Camp Nou, José Mari was immediately involved in the matchday squads under Johan Cruyff, starting seven of the remaining league games. He also featured in both legs of a UEFA Champions League tie with Paris Saint-Germain FC which ended in elimination, where he missed a good chance to score a vital away goal in France, angering the Dutch coach; in the domestic league, the side could only rank fourth.

=== Betis ===
In the 1995 summer transfer window, José Mari joined Betis – who had just finished above Barça in the table – for barely a third of his purchase price, £317,000, agreeing to a six-year deal. He was one of three Barcelona players transferred in discounted deals along with Óscar Arpón and former Osasuna teammate Francisco Sánchez Jara, in the wake of Ángel Cuéllar's move in the opposite direction via his buyout clause.

During his only year at the Estadio Benito Villamarín, José Mari totalled 23 games as Lorenzo Serra Ferrer's side went on to finish eighth. Subsequently, he left Seville and moved to Athletic Bilbao for a transfer fee of around £1.2 million, arranged by controversial club president Manuel Ruiz de Lopera without the knowledge of the manager.

=== Athletic Bilbao ===
José Mari signed a four-year contract with Athletic, being eligible under their recruitment policy due to learning his skills at a club in the region. A teammate from his time with Osasuna youths, Iñigo Larrainzar, was already playing there.

In his first season, 1996–97 – at the outset of the Luis Fernández managerial era – José Mari was a regular fixture (33 games, 28 starts), scoring the winning goal on his debut against Rayo Vallecano and netting the equaliser in an eventual 2–1 home victory over his former side Barcelona on 23 November 1996. His status thereafter diminished to squad member, and he only took part in 35 matches the next three years.

José Mari did play the whole game in a crucial win over Zaragoza in May 1998 which ensured that Athletic finished runners-up, which he described as "the most intense game I played in". This success enabled him to appear once more in the Champions League, where he started a group-phase fixture against Rosenborg BK.

José Mari departed from Bilbao on 30 June 2000 at the end of his contract, aged 29. He made 77 official appearances in a four-year tenure.

=== Later career ===
Afterwards, José Mari was a regular in the second tier with both CD Leganés and Burgos CF, being administratively relegated with the latter. He then dropped down one further level to play with CF Reus Deportiu, but a worsening back injury marred his short return to Catalonia, as his team was also relegated.

== Post-retirement, coaching ==
After retiring, José Mari returned to Seville. In 2006, he was one of a group of former Betis players including Rafael Gordillo and Roberto Ríos which took over lowly Écija Balompié in an ambitious project, being installed as sporting director; his time there coincided with the rise of future international Nolito, and they also brought former Athletic player Igor Angulo to the Andalusian club, which won its third-division section in 2007–08 but missed out in the play-offs, and in 2010 the ownership was acquired by an Écija supporters' group amid economic problems.

During the 2011–12 season, José Mari worked with Betis' reserves as the assistant manager to Risto Vidaković (as part of the backroom staff led by former teammate and friend Vlada Stošić).
