= Ismael Urzaiz =

Spanish former footballer (born 1971)

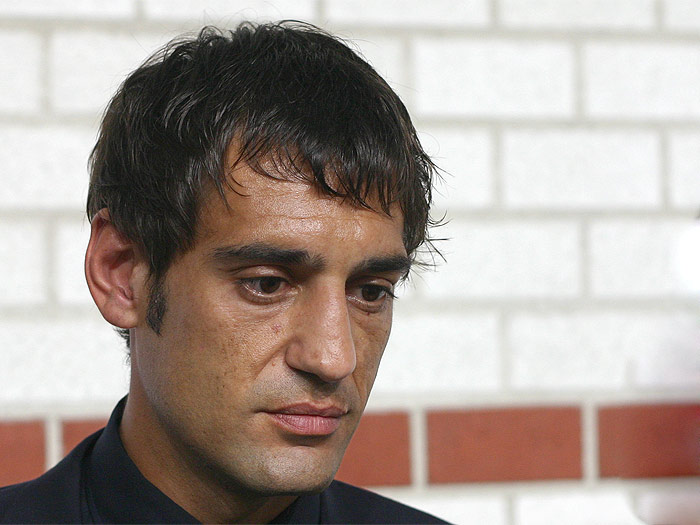
- Urzaiz in 2007

Personal information
- Full name: Ismael Urzaiz Aranda
- Date of birth: 7 October 1971 (age 55)
- Place of birth: Tudela, Spain
- Height: 1.88 m (6 ft 2 in)
- Position: Centre-forward

Youth career
- Tudelano
- 1985–1989: Real Madrid

Senior career*
| Years | Team | Apps | (Gls) |
| 1989–1993 | Real Madrid B | 50 | (13) |
| 1990–1993 | Real Madrid | 0 | (0) |
| 1991–1992 | → Albacete (loan) | 11 | (1) |
| 1993 | → Celta (loan) | 6 | (1) |
| 1993–1994 | Rayo Vallecano | 20 | (1) |
| 1994–1995 | Salamanca | 21 | (3) |
| 1995–1996 | Espanyol | 41 | (13) |
| 1996–2007 | Athletic Bilbao | 367 | (115) |
| 2007–2008 | Ajax | 3 | (0) |
| Total | | 519 | (147) |

International career
| 1987–1988 | Spain U16 | 11 | (5) |
| 1988 | Spain U17 | 1 | (2) |
| 1988–1990 | Spain U18 | 7 | (6) |
| 1988–1991 | Spain U19 | 9 | (3) |
| 1989–1991 | Spain U20 | 5 | (4) |
| 1990–1992 | Spain U21 | 6 | (1) |
| 1991–1992 | Spain U23 | 2 | (0) |
| 1996–2001 | Spain | 25 | (8) |
| 1997–2006 | Basque Country | 8 | (3) |
- * Club domestic league appearances and goals

Ismael Urzaiz Aranda (Spanish pronunciation: [ismaˈel uɾˈθajθ aˈɾanda]; born 7 October 1971) is a Spanish former professional footballer who played as a centre-forward.

Best known for his physical strength and aerial ability, the unsuccessful youth graduate at Real Madrid went on to represent seven other teams during his extensive career, mainly Athletic Bilbao where he spent 11 years. Over 16 seasons, he amassed La Liga totals of 445 matches and 131 goals (61 headers, record of the competition).

Urzaiz appeared 25 times for Spain, representing the national team at Euro 2000.

== Club career ==
=== Real Madrid ===
Born in Tudela, Navarre, Urzaiz began his professional career at Real Madrid's reserves, joining the youth system from local Tudelano in 1985 and making his debut in the Segunda División four years later. Despite being a successful youth international, he did not make any La Liga appearances for the first team (however, he did play one game against Danish club OB, in the 1990–91 European Cup).

Urzaiz spent the 1991–92 season on loan at Albacete, making his top-flight debut when he came on as a substitute in a 4–0 home win against Athletic Bilbao on 20 October 1991. In early 1993, he was loaned to Celta de Vigo in the same league.

=== Professional journeyman ===
Urzaiz left Real Madrid permanently in 1993, and in the following three seasons he played for Rayo Vallecano, Salamanca and Espanyol, with a very modest scoring rate in the first two teams. He helped Salamanca to win promotion to the top tier in 1995, scoring twice as they beat Albacete 5–0 in the play-offs following a 2–0 home loss in the first leg.

The following campaign, Urzaiz joined Espanyol for 35 million pesetas and exploded as a first-rate attacking player, netting 13 league goals for a side that eventually finished fourth, including a hat-trick against his former club Rayo Vallecano for a 4–2 home victory on 14 April 1996.

=== Athletic Bilbao ===
The form of a revived Urzaiz attracted interest, and in summer 1996 he joined Athletic Bilbao for a 500 million pesetas fee, being eligible for the all-Basque team having been born in Navarre. In eleven seasons, he scored 115 goals in 367 league appearances. In 1997–98, his eight successful strikes in 32 matches helped to a runner-up finish, which led to direct qualification for the UEFA Champions League, where he scored once in seven games.

Urzaiz scored in double figures in six of his campaigns at the San Mamés Stadium, but the emergence of youth graduate Fernando Llorente – even taller at 1.95 m (6 ft 5 in) – prompted his exit in July 2007; he still featured in 35 competitive games in his final year, coincidentally also his age by its end, but only completed the 90 minutes in six of them.

As well as being only the 14th player (at that point) to pass 400 appearances for Athletic, Urzaiz's total of 419 games set a club record for a player from Navarre which stood until 2020 when overtaken by Iker Muniain.

=== Ajax ===
On 19 July 2007, Urzaiz signed a one-year contract with Ajax, joining fellow Spaniards Gabri and Albert Luque. He made his official debut on 15 August, in the Champions League qualifier against Slavia Prague (1–0 home loss, 18 minutes played).

Urzaiz was released by the Amsterdam club after just three Eredivisie appearances, announcing his retirement at nearly 37 shortly afterwards.

== International career ==
Urzaiz represented Spain at the 1988 UEFA European Under-16 Championship on home soil, helping his country to win the tournament. He also scored four goals for the under-20 team at the 1991 FIFA World Youth Championship, held in Portugal.

On 10 October 1996, Urzaiz made his debut for the senior side, a 0–0 away draw with the Czech Republic for the 1998 FIFA World Cup qualifiers. Over the next three years he made only three more appearances and failed to score, but emerged as the hero as Spain qualified for UEFA Euro 2000, netting six times in three games – this included two against Austria and a hat-trick against Cyprus. After a further two in a friendly with Poland, he was picked for the final stages in Belgium and the Netherlands.

The recipient of 25 caps with eight goals, Urzaiz made his last international appearance in a 3–0 friendly loss to England in Birmingham, in 2001. Between 1997 and 2005 he also played seven times for the Basque Country representative team, scoring twice in a 3–2 win over Morocco in 2000.

== Career statistics ==
=== Club ===
Appearances and goals by club, season and competition
| Club | Season | League | | | National cup | | Europe | | Other | | Total | |
| Club | Season | Division | Apps | Goals | Apps | Goals | Apps | Goals | Apps | Goals | Apps | Goals |
|---|---|---|---|---|---|---|---|---|---|---|---|---|
| Real Madrid B | 1989–90 | Segunda División | 10 | 5 | 0 | 0 | – | | – | | 10 | 5 |
| Real Madrid B | 1990–91 | Segunda División B | 13 | 0 | 0 | 0 | – | | – | | 13 | 0 |
| Real Madrid B | 1992–93 | Segunda División | 27 | 8 | – | | – | | – | | 27 | 8 |
| Real Madrid B | Total | | 50 | 13 | 0 | 0 | 0 | 0 | 0 | 0 | 50 | 13 |
| Real Madrid | 1990–91 | La Liga | 0 | 0 | 0 | 0 | 1 (Note: Appearance in European Cup) | 0 | – | | 1 | 0 |
| Real Madrid | 1991–92 | La Liga | 0 | 0 | 0 | 0 | 0 | 0 | – | | 0 | 0 |
| Real Madrid | 1992–93 | La Liga | 0 | 0 | 1 | 0 | 0 | 0 | – | | 1 | 0 |
| Real Madrid | Total | | 0 | 0 | 1 | 0 | 1 | 0 | 0 | 0 | 2 | 0 |
| Albacete (loan) | 1991–92 | La Liga | 11 | 1 | 1 | 0 | – | | – | | 12 | 1 |
| Celta (loan) | 1992–93 | La Liga | 6 | 1 | 0 | 0 | – | | – | | 6 | 1 |
| Rayo Vallecano | 1993–94 | La Liga | 20 | 1 | 3 | 3 | – | | 3 (Note: Appearances in promotion/relegation play-offs) | 1 | 26 | 5 |
| Salamanca | 1994–95 | Segunda División | 21 | 3 | 5 | 1 | – | | 2 | 2 | 28 | 6 |
| Espanyol | 1995–96 | La Liga | 41 | 13 | 10 | 2 | 0 | 0 | – | | 51 | 15 |
| Athletic Bilbao | 1996–97 | La Liga | 38 | 16 | 4 | 2 | – | | – | | 42 | 18 |
| Athletic Bilbao | 1997–98 | La Liga | 32 | 8 | 3 | 2 | 3 (Note: Appearances in UEFA Cup) | 0 | – | | 38 | 10 |
| Athletic Bilbao | 1998–99 | La Liga | 36 | 16 | 2 | 0 | 7 (Note: Appearances in UEFA Champions League) | 1 | – | | 45 | 17 |
| Athletic Bilbao | 1999–00 | La Liga | 33 | 5 | 4 | 2 | – | | – | | 37 | 7 |
| Athletic Bilbao | 2000–01 | La Liga | 34 | 10 | 4 | 3 | – | | – | | 38 | 13 |
| Athletic Bilbao | 2001–02 | La Liga | 36 | 16 | 6 | 2 | – | | – | | 42 | 18 |
| Athletic Bilbao | 2002–03 | La Liga | 31 | 13 | 2 | 1 | – | | – | | 33 | 14 |
| Athletic Bilbao | 2003–04 | La Liga | 37 | 8 | 1 | 0 | – | | – | | 38 | 8 |
| Athletic Bilbao | 2004–05 | La Liga | 31 | 12 | 5 | 0 | 8 | 0 | – | | 44 | 12 |
| Athletic Bilbao | 2005–06 | La Liga | 26 | 3 | 1 | 0 | 0 | 0 | – | | 27 | 3 |
| Athletic Bilbao | 2006–07 | La Liga | 33 | 8 | 2 | 0 | – | | – | | 35 | 8 |
| Athletic Bilbao | Total | | 367 | 115 | 34 | 12 | 18 | 1 | 0 | 0 | 419 | 128 |
| Ajax | 2007–08 | Eredivisie | 3 | 0 | 0 | 0 | 3 (Note: Two appearances in UEFA Champions League, one appearance in UEFA Cup) | 0 | 0 | 0 | 6 | 0 |
| Career total | | | 519 | 147 | 54 | 18 | 22 | 1 | 5 | 3 | 600 | 169 |

=== International ===
Scores and results list Spain's goal tally first, score column indicates score after each Urzaiz goal.

List of international goals scored by Ismael Urzaiz
| No. | Date | Venue | Opponent | Score | Result | Competition |
|---|---|---|---|---|---|---|
| 1 | 27 March 1999 | Mestalla, Valencia, Spain | Austria | 3–0 | 9–0 | Euro 2000 qualifying |
| 2 | 27 March 1999 | Mestalla, Valencia, Spain | Austria | 5–0 | 9–0 | Euro 2000 qualifying |
| 3 | 31 March 1999 | Olimpico, Serravalle, San Marino | San Marino | 3–0 | 6–0 | Euro 2000 qualifying |
| 4 | 8 September 1999 | Nuevo Vivero, Badajoz, Spain | Cyprus | 1–0 | 8–0 | Euro 2000 qualifying |
| 5 | 8 September 1999 | Nuevo Vivero, Badajoz, Spain | Cyprus | 2–0 | 8–0 | Euro 2000 qualifying |
| 6 | 8 September 1999 | Nuevo Vivero, Badajoz, Spain | Cyprus | 4–0 | 8–0 | Euro 2000 qualifying |
| 7 | 26 January 2000 | Cartagonova, Cartagena, Spain | Poland | 2–0 | 3–0 | Friendly |
| 8 | 26 January 2000 | Cartagonova, Cartagena, Spain | Poland | 3–0 | 3–0 | Friendly |

== Honours ==
Spain U16

- UEFA European Under-16 Championship: 1988

Individual

- FIFA U-20 World Cup: Silver Shoe 1991

== See also ==
- List of Athletic Bilbao players (+200 appearances)
- List of La Liga players (400+ appearances)
