= Aitor Larrazábal =

Spanish football manager (born 1971)

Personal information
- Full name: Aitor Larrazábal Bilbao
- Date of birth: 21 June 1971 (age 55)
- Place of birth: Bilbao, Spain
- Height: 1.72 m (5 ft 8 in)
- Position: Left-back

Youth career
- 1982–1989: Athletic Bilbao

Senior career*
Years	Team	Apps	(Gls)
1989–1991	Bilbao Athletic	43	(2)
1990–2004	Athletic Bilbao	390	(39)
Total		433	(41)

International career
1990	Spain U20	1	(0)
1990–1991	Spain U21	4	(0)
1991	Spain U23	3	(0)
1997	Basque Country	1	(0)

Managerial career
- 2008–2009: Gatika
- 2009–2011: Lemona
- 2011–2015: Athletic Bilbao (youth)
- 2016: Marbella
- 2016–2017: Amorebieta
- 2017–2019: Barakaldo
- 2019–2020: Salamanca
- 2020: Barakaldo
- 2022–2023: Gernika
- 2024: Logroñés
- * Club domestic league appearances and goals

Aitor Larrazábal Bilbao (born 21 June 1971) is a Spanish former professional footballer who played solely for Athletic Bilbao, currently a manager.

A left-back of attacking penchant, he appeared in 445 competitive matches for his only club and was also a penalty kick specialist, scoring at least one La Liga goal in 13 of his 14 seasons.

== Playing career ==
Larrazábal was born in Bilbao, Biscay. Having joined Athletic Bilbao's youth ranks at 11, he started playing professionally with its reserves in the Segunda División, and made his first-team debut on 2 September 1990 in a 1–0 away loss against Tenerife, finishing his first year in La Liga with 18 games.

From then onwards, Larrazábal was an undisputed starter for the Basques, scoring and assisting alike. In the 1997–98 season, as Bilbao finished runners-up, he scored a career-best seven league goals, being instrumental as his team qualified for the subsequent edition of the UEFA Champions League, where he featured, for instance, in both group stage draws against Juventus, although they eventually ranked last.

After the emergence of Asier del Horno (another Lezama youth graduate) in the 2002–03 campaign, Larrazábal still featured prominently in his last two seasons – 36 matches, three goals – but eventually retired from the game in May 2004 at the age of 33, after a two-decade link with a sole club.

== Coaching career ==
Larrazábal subsequently became a coach: after starting in amateur football, he joined lowly Lemona (Basque Country) from Segunda División B in 2009, leading the side to the sixth position in his first year and narrowly missing out on play-off qualification. After a second season in Lemoa in which the team reached the final of the Copa Federación de España, he returned to Athletic Bilbao to take up a position as sporting director, following the election of former teammate Josu Urrutia as president in July 2011.

In 2013, a reorganisation of functions at the club saw Larrazábal take over responsibility for its youth system, with José María Amorrortu (the director of football) focusing on the senior team. The former resigned from the position in summer 2015, citing professional differences and a desire to return to managerial roles.

In April 2016, Larrazábal became manager of third-tier Marbella for a short spell, and although they only collected two points from his three games in charge, it was enough to successfully steer them away from the relegation zone by the end of the campaign. For the following season he moved back to the Basque Country, taking control of Amorebieta of the same league; they escaped relegation by a single point.

Larrazábal was appointed at Barakaldo in the same division in June 2017. Three years later, following a brief spell at Salamanca, he returned to his previous club.

On 28 December 2020, Larrazábal was replaced by his assistant Germán Beltrán, but continued in his role of sporting director. He returned to management in June 2022, joining Segunda Federación side Gernika and leaving at the end of 2022–23.

Larrazábal moved to the Primera Federación with Logroñés on 26 December 2023. In May 2024, he became Gernika's new sporting director.

== Personal life ==
Larrazábal's son, Gaizka, is also a footballer. A right winger by position, in summer 2017 he joined Athletic Bilbao (being assigned to the reserves) from Zamudio, having played against the Amorebieta team managed by his father during the preceding season.

== Managerial statistics ==
As of 27 May 2023

Managerial record by team and tenure
Team	Nat	From	To	Record								Ref
Team	Nat	From	To	G	W	D	L	GF	GA	GD	Win %	Ref
Gatika	(Spain)	1 July 2008	30 June 2009	34	16	11	7	38	25	+13	47.06	
Lemona	(Spain)	1 July 2009	30 June 2011	89	31	33	25	116	97	+19	34.83	
Marbella	(Spain)	26 April 2016	15 June 2016	3	0	2	1	7	9	−2	0.00	
Amorebieta	(Spain)	15 June 2016	5 June 2017	41	14	10	17	52	53	−1	34.15	
Barakaldo	(Spain)	5 June 2017	15 June 2019	83	35	26	22	101	80	+21	42.17	
Salamanca	(Spain)	27 November 2019	18 February 2020	11	2	2	7	8	18	−10	18.18	
Barakaldo	(Spain)	4 June 2020	27 December 2020	9	1	1	7	6	18	−12	11.11	
Gernika	(Spain)	9 June 2022	5 June 2023	38	15	10	13	41	37	+4	39.47	
Career Total				308	114	95	99	369	337	+32	37.01	—

== See also ==
- List of one-club men
