= Jesús María Lacruz =

Spanish footballer

Jesús Maria Lacruz
Personal information
- Full name: Jesús María Lacruz Gómez
- Date of birth: 25 April 1978 (age 48)
- Place of birth: Pamplona, Spain
- Height: 1.78 m (5 ft 10 in)
- Position: Defender

Youth career
- 1993–1994: Osasuna

Senior career*
Years	Team	Apps	(Gls)
1994–1995	Osasuna B	34	(0)
1995–1997	Osasuna	48	(1)
1997–2006	Athletic Bilbao	224	(12)
2006–2009	Espanyol	48	(0)
2010–2012	Real Unión	56	(1)
Total		410	(14)

International career
1995–1996	Spain U18	6	(0)
1997	Spain U20	4	(0)
1998–2000	Spain U21	9	(0)
2000	Spain U23	5	(1)
2003–2005	Navarre	2	(0)
- * Club domestic league appearances and goals

Olympic medal record

Representing Spain

Men's Football
Silver medal – second place	2000 Sydney	Team competition

Jesús María Lacruz Gómez (born 25 April 1978) is a Spanish former professional footballer who played as a versatile defender.

He amassed La Liga totals of 272 games and 12 goals over the course of 12 seasons, representing Athletic Bilbao and Espanyol in the competition.

== Club career ==
Born in Pamplona, Navarre, Lacruz's professional career began in 1994 with hometown side CA Osasuna in the Segunda División, making his first appearance for the main squad aged just 17, and in 1997 he joined Athletic Bilbao, where he made his La Liga debut in a 1–0 home win against Atlético Madrid on 13 September. He was a regular starter for the latter in six of his nine seasons.

After 251 official matches with Athletic – five in the 1998–99 edition of the UEFA Champions League– Lacruz moved to RCD Espanyol in summer 2006 for €300,000 on a three-year contract, reuniting with his former manager Ernesto Valverde. His first competitive appearance took place on 17 August in a 0–1 home loss to FC Barcelona in the Supercopa de España, and he scored his first goal for his new team against A.S. Livorno Calcio in a UEFA Cup fixture. In the same competition, he added another in a 2–1 away victory over SV Werder Bremen as the Catalans went on to lose the final to Sevilla FC on penalties. After only ten league appearances in the 2008–09 campaign, the 31-year-old left the Estadi Olímpic Lluís Companys.

On 14 January 2010, after several months without a club, Lacruz signed for modest Real Unión on a free transfer, until the end of the second-division season, thus returning to the Basque Country. He appeared in 20 games in his first year (all starts), in an eventual relegation.

== International career ==
Lacruz was part of the Spain squad that won the silver medal at the 2000 Summer Olympics in Sydney, losing the final to Cameroon. Additionally, he represented the nation at under-18, under-20 and under-21 levels.

== Honours ==
Espanyol

- UEFA Cup runner-up: 2006–07

Spain U23

- Summer Olympic silver medal: 2000
