= Julen Guerrero =

Spanish footballer

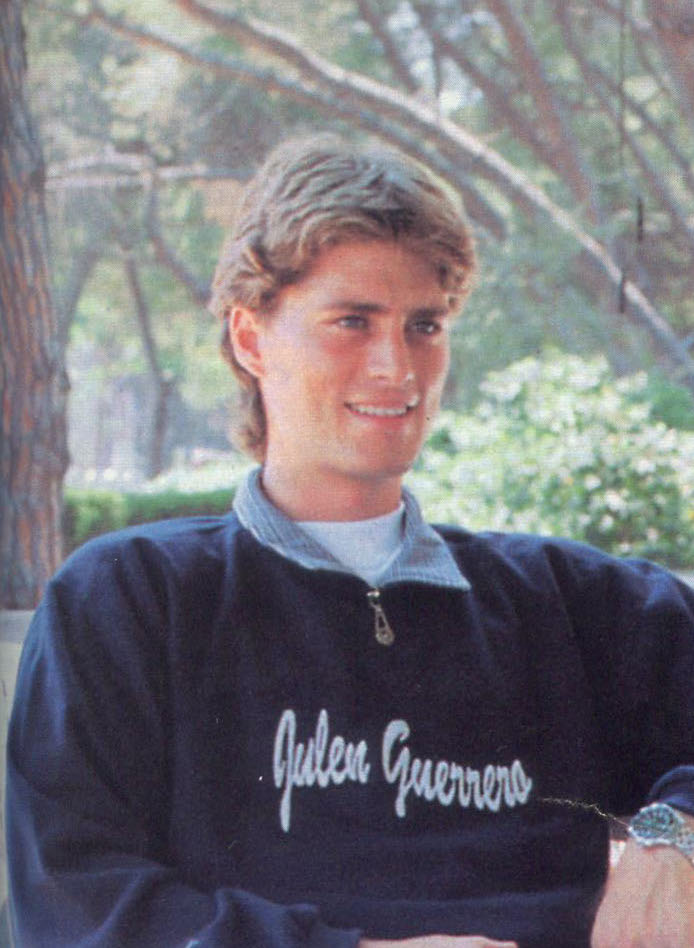
- Guerrero in a 1995 advert

Personal information
- Full name: Julen Guerrero López
- Date of birth: 7 January 1974 (age 52)
- Place of birth: Portugalete, Spain
- Height: 1.79 m (5 ft 10 in)
- Position: Attacking midfielder

Youth career
- 1982–1992: Athletic Bilbao

Senior career*
Years	Team	Apps	(Gls)
1992	Bilbao Athletic	12	(6)
1992–2006	Athletic Bilbao	372	(101)
Total		384	(107)

International career
1989–1990	Spain U16	9	(7)
1990–1991	Spain U17	8	(3)
1990–1991	Spain U18	14	(2)
1992–1994	Spain U21	12	(8)
1993–2000	Spain	41	(13)
1993–2006	Basque Country	11	(6)

Managerial career
- 2018–2020: Spain U16
- 2019–2020: Spain U15
- 2021–2023: Spain U17
- 2024: Amorebieta
Medal record
Men's football
Representing Spain
UEFA European Under-21 Championship
Bronze medal – third place	1994 France
- * Club domestic league appearances and goals

Julen Guerrero López (born 7 January 1974) is a Spanish former professional footballer who played solely for Athletic Bilbao as an attacking midfielder.

He appeared in 430 official games for his only club, scoring 116 goals and helping them to finish second in La Liga in the 1997–98 season.

A Spain international between 1993 and 2000, Guerrero represented the country at the 1994 and 1998 World Cups, as well as Euro 1996. After retiring, he coached several age groups of the national team, and had a brief spell at club level with Amorebieta.

== Club career ==
Born in Portugalete in Biscay, Guerrero joined Athletic Bilbao as an eight-year-old, and subsequently progressed through the junior ranks of the club. Along with Aitor Karanka, he was a member of the under-19 team that won a national double of cup and league in 1991–92, and also appeared and scored for the reserves in the Segunda División during the same season.

Guerrero made his senior debut on 6 September 1992 aged 18, under Jupp Heynckes. He quickly made an impact and, although a midfielder, totalled 28 La Liga goals in his first two seasons (65 in six). He was awarded the New Spanish Player of the Year by El País in 1993, and won the Spanish Footballer of the Year by both Don Balón and El País the following year. In 1993–94 he scored a hat-trick against Albacete (4–1, home), adding four against Sporting de Gijón (7–0 also at the San Mamés Stadium); his arrival at the first team was met with unprecedented furor amongst the younger population due to both his footballing abilities and his charisma, and he became one of the first football celebrities as his pop-like figure boosted Athletic's image overseas. He finished the campaign with 18 – fifth in the charts– and was named the side's youngest-ever captain by Dragoslav Stepanović shortly after.

The early promise Guerrero showed attracted interest from, among others, Real Madrid, Barcelona, Atlético Madrid, Juventus, Lazio and Manchester United. However, he remained loyal to Athletic and, in 1997, signed a ten-year contract which was the longest in the club's history, and also made him the team's highest-paid player.

In 1997–98, Guerrero netted eight times in 29 matches as the Basques finished second, leading to direct qualification for the UEFA Champions League where he put on strong performances in the group stage against Juventus and Galatasaray. Subsequently, however, his career went into decline and, in 2002, he was deemed surplus to requirements by coach Luis Fernández while still only 28; in his last four seasons he could only manage 57 games with just four goals but, despite his poor form, remained a fan favourite, and the decision to drop him caused some controversy.

Guerrero announced his retirement as a player at an emotional press conference on 11 July 2006. He scored 116 goals in 430 competitive matches over the course of 14 seasons, including four in 17 appearances in various European competitions, but did not win any major honours.

== International career ==
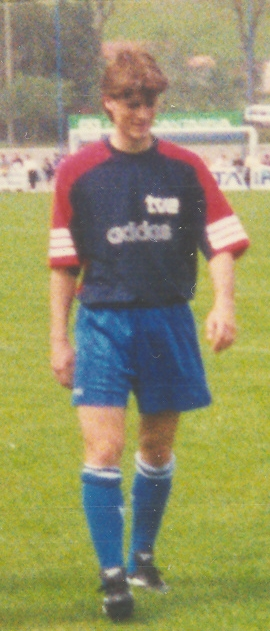
Guerrero training with Spain in 1994

On 27 January 1993, when still only 19, Guerrero made his debut for Spain in a friendly with Mexico, in Las Palmas. He went on to play 41 games and score 13 goals, and also represented the nation at the 1994 and 1998 FIFA World Cups and UEFA Euro 1996.

Among Guerrero's personal international highlights were hat-tricks against Malta (3–0 in Attard, on 18 December 1996) and Cyprus (8–0, 8 September 1999). His last international took place in October 2000.

Guerrero also played 11 times (Note: He made 12 appearances in total, but his debut in 1993 was against club side Real Sociedad, not counted by some sources.) for the Basque Country autonomous team between 1993 and 2006, scoring six goals – this included another hat-trick in 1997, against Yugoslavia. Both were records for some years, although Xabi Prieto went on to appear in more matches and Aritz Aduriz scored more goals.

== Style of play ==
Often hailed as one of the greatest attacking midfielders of his generation, Guerrero was ambidextrous, and was renowned for his free kicks and finishing skills, derived from his sharp nose for goals. He was often referred to by the media as El Rey León (The Lion King) and La Perla de Lezama (The Pearl of Lezama).

== Coaching career ==
Immediately after retiring, Guerrero took charge of the Lezama youth ranks, leaving the post after two years. He was subsequently in charge of Spain's youths, working with the under-16s, under-15s and under-17s until his departure on 5 June 2023.

On 20 June 2024, Guerrero was appointed manager of Amorebieta, recently relegated to Primera Federación. On 29 October, with only one win in ten matches and with his team bottom of the table, he was dismissed.

== Personal life ==
Guerrero's younger brother, José Félix, was also a footballer and a midfielder. He was also brought up at Athletic Bilbao, but only appeared for the reserve team.

Guerrero also opened the Restaurante Julen Guerrero in Zamudio, and worked as an online columnist for Eurosport. His son Julen Jon Guerrero is also a midfielder who developed mainly at Real Madrid, represented Spain at youth levels and briefly played under his father at Amorebieta.

On 16 April 2026, Guerrero's wife of 26 years Elsa Landabaso died; at the time of her death, both were aged 52.

== Career statistics ==
=== Club ===
Appearances and goals by club, season and competition
Club	Season	League		Cup		Europe		Total	
Club	Season	Apps	Goals	Apps	Goals	Apps	Goals	Apps	Goals
Bilbao Athletic	1991–92	12	6	–		–		12	6
Athletic Bilbao	1992–93	37	10	0	0	–		37	10
Athletic Bilbao	1993–94	36	18	4	3	–		40	21
Athletic Bilbao	1994–95	27	13	2	1	4	2	33	16
Athletic Bilbao	1995–96	33	9	6	1	–		39	10
Athletic Bilbao	1996–97	38	15	5	1	–		43	16
Athletic Bilbao	1997–98	29	8	3	0	1	0	33	8
Athletic Bilbao	1998–99	36	9	2	1	8	2	46	12
Athletic Bilbao	1999–2000	32	6	3	0	–		35	6
Athletic Bilbao	2000–01	27	4	2	0	–		29	4
Athletic Bilbao	2001–02	20	5	6	2	–		26	7
Athletic Bilbao	2002–03	14	0	2	2	–		16	2
Athletic Bilbao	2003–04	14	1	0	0	–		14	1
Athletic Bilbao	2004–05	12	3	4	0	2	0	18	3
Athletic Bilbao	2005–06	17	0	2	0	2	0	21	0
Athletic Bilbao	Total	372	101	41	11	17	4	430	116
Career total		384	107	41	11	17	4	442	122

=== International ===
Scores and results list Spain's goal tally first, score column indicates score after each Guerrero goal.

List of international goals scored by Julen Guerrero
No.	Date	Venue	Opponent	Score	Result	Competition
1	2 June 1993	Žalgiris Stadium, Vilnius, Lithuania	Lithuania	1–0	2–0	1994 World Cup qualification
2	2 June 1993	Žalgiris Stadium, Vilnius, Lithuania	Lithuania	2–0	2–0	1994 World Cup qualification
3	8 September 1993	Rico Pérez, Alicante, Spain	Chile	1–0	2–0	Friendly
4	8 September 1993	Rico Pérez, Alicante, Spain	Chile	2–0	2–0	Friendly
5	29 March 1995	Sánchez Pizjuán, Seville, Spain	Belgium	1–0	1–1	Euro 1996 qualifying
6	6 September 1995	Los Cármenes, Granada, Spain	Cyprus	1–0	6–0	Euro 1996 qualifying
7	20 September 1995	Vicente Calderón, Madrid, Spain	Argentina	2–0	2–1	Friendly
8	18 December 1996	Ta' Qali, Attard, Malta	Malta	1–0	3–0	1998 World Cup qualification
9	18 December 1996	Ta' Qali, Attard, Malta	Malta	2–0	3–0	1998 World Cup qualification
10	18 December 1996	Ta' Qali, Attard, Malta	Malta	3–0	3–0	1998 World Cup qualification
11	8 September 1999	Vivero, Badajoz, Spain	Cyprus	3–0	8–0	Euro 2000 qualifying
12	8 September 1999	Vivero, Badajoz, Spain	Cyprus	5–0	8–0	Euro 2000 qualifying
13	8 September 1999	Vivero, Badajoz, Spain	Cyprus	6–0	8–0	Euro 2000 qualifying

== Honours ==
Spain U21

- UEFA European Under-21 Championship third place: 1994

Individual

- La Liga Breakthrough Player of the Year: 1993
- Spanish Player of the Year: 1994

== See also ==
- List of one-club men
