= 2007–08 UD Almería season =

UD Almería
2007–08 season
- President: Alfonso García
- Head coach: Unai Emery
- Stadium: Juegos Mediterráneos
- La Liga: 8th
- Copa del Rey: Round of 32
- Top goalscorer: League: Álvaro Negredo (13); All: Álvaro Negredo (13)
- Highest home attendance: 21,500 vs. Levante (30 Mar)
- Lowest home attendance: 13,148 vs. Osasuna (21 Oct)

In the 2007-2008 season, Unión Deportiva Almería played in two competitions: La Liga and the Copa del Rey. It was their first season in the top flight since their foundation in 1989, having secured promotion from the 2006–07 Segunda División as runners-up. La Liga football returned to Almería for the first time since their predecessor club, AD Almería, were relegated after the 1980–81 season.

== Squad ==
Retrieved on 21 December 2020

Note: Flags indicate national team as defined under FIFA eligibility rules; some limited exceptions apply. Players may hold more than one non-FIFA nationality.

No.	Pos.	Nation	Player
1	GK	BRA	Diego Alves
2	DF	ESP	Bruno
3	DF	ESP	Aitor López Rekarte
4	MF	BRA	Felipe Melo
5	FW	NGA	Kalu Uche
6	MF	ESP	José Luis Cabrera
7	FW	SRB	Veljko Paunović
8	MF	ESP	Albert Crusat
9	FW	ESP	Álvaro Negredo
10	MF	ESP	José Ortiz (captain)
11	DF	ESP	Domingo Cisma
12	MF	BRA	Iriney
13	GK	ESP	David Cobeño (on loan from Sevilla)

No.	Pos.	Nation	Player
14	DF	ESP	Rubén Pulido
15	MF	ESP	Corona
17	MF	ESP	Juanma Ortiz
18	DF	PER	Santiago Acasiete
21	DF	ESP	Carlos García
22	DF	ESP	Mané
23	MF	ESP	Fernando Soriano
24	DF	ESP	Juanito
25	GK	ESP	Aitor Alcalde
25	DF	BRA	Guilherme Santos
—	MF	PAR	Julio dos Santos (on loan from Bayern Munich)
—	FW	ESP	Natalio
—	FW	CHI	Mathías Vidangossy (on loan from Villarreal)

=== Out on loan ===
Note: Flags indicate national team as defined under FIFA eligibility rules; some limited exceptions apply. Players may hold more than one non-FIFA nationality.

No.	Pos.	Nation	Player
16	FW	ESP	Mario Bermejo (on loan at Polideportivo Ejido)

=== Almería B players ===
Retrieved on 21 December 2020

Note: Flags indicate national team as defined under FIFA eligibility rules; some limited exceptions apply. Players may hold more than one non-FIFA nationality.

No.	Pos.	Nation	Player
29	DF	ESP	Ángel Trujillo
—	DF	ESP	Álex Carmona
—	DF	ESP	Javier Devesa
—	DF	ESP	Gabi Ramos

No.	Pos.	Nation	Player
—	MF	ESP	José Galán
—	MF	ESP	Javi Lara
—	MF	ESP	Sergio Ortiz
—	FW	ESP	Hugo López

== Transfers ==
=== In ===
#	Pos	Player	From	Notes
Summer
1	GK	(Brazil) Diego Alves	(Brazil) Atlético Mineiro	
3	DF	(Spain) Aitor López Rekarte	(Spain) Real Sociedad	
4	MF	(Brazil) Felipe Melo	(Spain) Racing Santander	
9	FW	(Spain) Álvaro Negredo	(Spain) Real Madrid Castilla	
13	GK	(Spain) David Cobeño	(Spain) Sevilla	Loan
14	DF	(Spain) Rubén Pulido	(Spain) Getafe	
17	MF	(Spain) Juanma Ortiz	(Spain) Atlético Madrid	
24	DF	(Spain) Juanito	(Spain) Real Sociedad	
25	GK	(Spain) Aitor Alcalde	(Spain) Athletic Bilbao B	
	MF	(Paraguay) Julio dos Santos	(Germany) Bayern Munich	Loan
	FW	(Spain) Natalio	(Spain) Castellón	
	FW	(Chile) Mathías Vidangossy	(Spain) Villarreal	Loan
Winter
7	FW	(Serbia) Veljko Paunović	(Russia) Rubin Kazan	
25	DF	(Brazil) Guilherme Santos	(Brazil) Vasco da Gama	

=== Out ===
#	Pos	Player	From	Notes
Summer
1	GK	(Netherlands) Sander Westerveld	(Netherlands) Sparta Rotterdam	Free transfer
3	DF	(Spain) Rodri	(Spain) Deportivo La Coruña	Loan return
4	DF	(Spain) Pedro Mairata	(Spain) Gimnàstic de Tarragona	
7	FW	(Spain) Míchel	(Spain) Xerez	
12	FW	(Spain) José María Mena	(Spain) Deportivo Alavés	
14	DF	(Spain) David Bermudo	(Spain) Pontevedra	
16	FW	(Spain) Mario Bermejo	(Spain) Polideportivo Ejido	Loan
17	MF	(Spain) Gorka Larrea	(Spain) Real Sociedad	Loan return
19	MF	(Spain) Alberto Hernández	(Spain) Ceuta	
20	FW	(Spain) Francisco	(Spain) Granada 74	
24	DF	(France) Laurent de Palmas	(Spain) Elche	
25	GK	(Spain) Joaquín Valerio	(Spain) Elche	
26	GK	(Spain) Ricardo Molina	(Spain) Alicante	
Winter
6	MF	(Spain) José Luis Cabrera	(Spain) Deportivo Alavés	
	MF	(Paraguay) Julio dos Santos	(Germany) Bayern Munich	Loan return
	FW	(Spain) Natalio	(Spain) Cádiz	Loan
	FW	(Chile) Mathías Vidangossy	(Spain) Villarreal	Loan return

== Player statistics ==
=== Squad stats ===
Last updated on 21 December 2020.

No.	Pos	Nat	Player	Total		La Liga		Copa del Rey	
No.	Pos	Nat	Player	Apps	Goals	Apps	Goals	Apps	Goals
1	GK	(Brazil) BRA	Diego Alves	25	0	22+1	0	2	0
2	DF	(Spain) ESP	Bruno	36	0	34	0	1+1	0
3	DF	(Spain) ESP	Aitor López Rekarte	12	0	4+6	0	2	0
4	MF	(Brazil) BRA	Felipe Melo	35	7	30+4	7	1	0
5	FW	(Nigeria) NGA	Kalu Uche	32	3	10+20	3	2	0
7	FW	(Serbia) SRB	Veljko Paunović	7	2	1+6	2	0	0
8	MF	(Spain) ESP	Albert Crusat	35	3	31+3	3	1	0
9	FW	(Spain) ESP	Álvaro Negredo	38	13	34+2	13	0+2	0
10	MF	(Spain) ESP	José Ortiz	26	0	6+18	0	1+1	0
11	DF	(Spain) ESP	Domingo Cisma	13	0	9+2	0	2	0
12	MF	(Brazil) BRA	Iriney	8	0	2+6	0	0	0
13	GK	(Spain) ESP	David Cobeño	16	0	16	0	0	0
14	DF	(Spain) ESP	Rubén Pulido	28	4	25+2	3	1	1
15	MF	(Spain) ESP	Corona	34	1	21+11	1	2	0
17	MF	(Spain) ESP	Juanma Ortiz	34	2	29+4	2	0+1	0
18	DF	(Peru) PER	Santiago Acasiete	21	2	17+3	2	1	0
21	DF	(Spain) ESP	Carlos García	34	0	34	0	0	0
22	DF	(Spain) ESP	Mané	37	2	36	2	0+1	0
23	MF	(Spain) ESP	Fernando Soriano	35	2	26+8	2	1	0
24	DF	(Spain) ESP	Juanito	33	1	28+3	1	2	0
25	GK	(Spain) ESP	Aitor Alcalde	0	0	0	0	0	0
25	DF	(Brazil) BRA	Guilherme Santos	2	0	0+2	0	0	0
Players who have left the club after the start of the season:
6	MF	(Spain) ESP	José Luis Cabrera	4	0	1+2	0	1	0
	MF	(Paraguay) PAR	Julio dos Santos	0	0	0	0	0	0
	FW	(Spain) ESP	Natalio	15	1	2+11	0	2	1
	FW	(Chile) CHI	Mathías Vidangossy	0	0	0	0	0	0

=== Top scorers ===
Updated on 21 December 2020

Place	Position	Nation	Number	Name	La Liga	Copa del Rey	Total
1	FW	(Spain)	9	Álvaro Negredo	13	0	13
2	MF	(Brazil)	4	Felipe Melo	7	0	7
3	DF	(Spain)	14	Rubén Pulido	3	1	4
4	FW	(Nigeria)	5	Kalu Uche	3	0	3
4	MF	(Spain)	8	Albert Crusat	3	0	3
6	FW	(Serbia)	7	Veljko Paunović	2	0	2
6	MF	(Spain)	17	Juanma Ortiz	2	0	2
6	DF	(Peru)	18	Santiago Acasiete	2	0	2
6	DF	(Spain)	22	Mané	2	0	2
6	MF	(Spain)	23	Fernando Soriano	2	0	2
11	MF	(Spain)	15	Corona	1	0	1
11	DF	(Spain)	24	Juanito	1	0	1
11	FW	(Spain)		Natalio	0	1	1
–	Own goals				1	0	1
				TOTALS	42	2	44

=== Disciplinary record ===
Updated on 21 December 2020

Number	Nation	Position	Name	La Liga		Copa del Rey		Total	
Number	Nation	Position	Name	Booked	Sent off (straight red)	Booked	Sent off (straight red)	Booked	Sent off (straight red)
4	(Brazil)	MF	Felipe Melo	12	0	0	0	12	0
2	(Spain)	DF	Bruno	11	0	0	0	11	0
21	(Spain)	DF	Carlos García	11	0	0	0	11	0
14	(Spain)	DF	Rubén Pulido	9	1	0	0	9	1
24	(Spain)	DF	Juanito	9	1	0	0	9	1
23	(Spain)	MF	Fernando Soriano	10	0	0	0	10	0
8	(Spain)	MF	Albert Crusat	7	2	0	0	7	2
17	(Spain)	MF	Juanma Ortiz	9	0	0	0	9	0
22	(Spain)	DF	Mané	9	0	0	0	9	0
9	(Spain)	FW	Álvaro Negredo	3	0	1	0	4	0
15	(Spain)	MF	Corona	4	0	0	0	4	0
11	(Spain)	DF	Domingo Cisma	2	1	0	0	2	1
18	(Peru)	DF	Santiago Acasiete	2	1	0	0	2	1
1	(Brazil)	GK	Diego Alves	3	0	0	0	3	0
10	(Spain)	MF	José Ortiz	3	0	0	0	3	0
13	(Spain)	GK	David Cobeño	1	1	0	0	1	1
3	(Spain)	DF	Aitor López Rekarte	2	0	0	0	2	0
6	(Spain)	MF	José Luis Cabrera	0	0	0	1	0	1
7	(Serbia)	FW	Veljko Paunović	0	1	0	0	0	1
5	(Nigeria)	FW	Kalu Uche	1	0	0	0	1	0
			TOTALS	108	8	1	1	109	9

== Season Results ==
=== La Liga ===
Pos	Team	Pld	W	D	L	GF	GA	GD	Pts	Qualification or relegation
6	Racing Santander	38	17	9	12	42	41	+1	60	Qualification for the UEFA Cup first round
7	Mallorca	38	15	14	9	69	54	+15	59	
8	Almería	38	14	10	14	42	45	−3	52 (Note: DEP 0–3 ALM; ALM 1–0 DEP)	
9	Deportivo La Coruña	38	15	7	16	46	47	−1	52	Qualification for the Intertoto Cup third round
10	Valencia	38	15	6	17	48	62	−14	51	Qualification for the UEFA Cup first round (Note: Valencia entered UEFA Cup as winners of 2007–08 Copa del Rey.)

Source: LFP
Rules for classification: 1st points; 2nd head-to-head points; 3rd head-to-head goal difference; 4th head-to-head goals scored; 5th goal difference; 6th number of goals scored; 7th Fair-play points

==== Results summary ====
Overall								Home						Away					
Pld	W	D	L	GF	GA	GD	Pts	W	D	L	GF	GA	GD	W	D	L	GF	GA	GD
38	14	10	14	42	45	−3	52	9	5	5	18	14	+4	5	5	9	24	31	−7

Last updated: 21 December 2020.

==== Matches ====
26 August 2007 1	Deportivo La Coruña	0 – 3	Almería	A Coruña, Spain
18:00		Report	18' Negredo; 33' Soriano; 50' Crusat; (yellow card) Bruno; (yellow card) Jo. Ortiz	Stadium: Estadio Riazor; Attendance: 20,000; Referee: Francisco Javier Ontanaya López-Astilleros

2 September 2007 2	Almería	1 – 2	Valencia	Almería, Spain
18:00	Soriano (yellow card) 33'; Negredo 63'; Crusat (yellow card) 69'; Melo (yellow card) 88'	Report	46' (yellow card) 70' Morientes; (yellow card) 57' Albelda; 80' Moretti; (yellow card) Baraja	Stadium: Estadio de los Juegos Mediterráneos; Attendance: 17,500; Referee: Eduardo Iturralde González

15 September 2007 3	Real Madrid	3 – 1	Almería	Madrid, Spain
19:00	Guti (yellow card) 30'; Saviola 36'; Ramos (yellow card) 59'; Sneijder 68'; Higuaín 88'; Gago (yellow card) 88'	Report	(red card) 60' Crusat; (yellow card) 66' Soriano; 73' Uche	Stadium: Santiago Bernabéu Stadium; Attendance: 73,000; Referee: Alfonso J. Alvarez Izquierdo

23 September 2007 4	Almería	1 – 1	Real Mallorca	Almería, Spain
16:00	Mané 35'; García (yellow card) 64'	Report	(yellow card) 17' Héctor; 78' Güiza	Stadium: Estadio de los Juegos Mediterráneos; Attendance: 15,000; Referee: Lizondo Cortés

26 September 2007 5	Real Murcia	0 – 1	Almería	Murcia, Spain
19:00	Pignol (yellow card) 6'; Gallardo (yellow card) (yellow-red card) 59'; Regueiro (yellow card) (yellow-red card) 62'; Peña (yellow card) 63'; Mejía (yellow card) 88'	Report	(yellow card) 25' Bruno; 41' Melo	Stadium: Estadio Nueva Condomina; Attendance: 24,250; Referee: Javier Turienzo Álvarez

30 September 2007 6	Almería	0 – 1	Racing Santander	Almería, Spain
16:00	García (yellow card) 38'; Soriano (yellow card) 50'; Melo (yellow card) 63'	Report	7' Garay; (yellow card) 79' López	Stadium: Estadio de los Juegos Mediterráneos; Attendance: 15,000; Referee: Antonio Rubinos Pérez

7 October 2007 7	Athletic Bilbao	1 – 1	Almería	Bilbao, Spain
16:00	Iraola (yellow card) 8'; Ocio (yellow card) 18'; Etxeberria 31' del Horno (red card) 42'; Martínez (yellow card) 69'; Susaeta (yellow card) 76'; Orbaiz (yellow card)	Report	(yellow card) 19' Juanito; (yellow card) 20' (goal) 61' Melo; (yellow card) Corona	Stadium: San Mamés; Attendance: 37,000; Referee: Bernardino González Vázquez

21 October 2007 8	Almería	2 – 0	Osasuna	Almería, Spain
16:00	Bruno (yellow card) 19'; Melo 51' (pen.); Juanito (yellow card) 60'; Negredo 69'	Report	(yellow card) 7' García; (red card) 49' Elía; (yellow card) 55' Puñal; (yellow card) Corrales	Stadium: Estadio de los Juegos Mediterráneos; Attendance: 13,148; Referee: Francisco Javier Ontanaya López-Astilleros

28 October 2007 9	Barcelona	2 – 0	Almería	Barcelona, Spain
18:00	Milito (yellow card) 6'; Henry 37'; Messi 81'; Abidal (yellow card) 90'	Report	(yellow card) 2' Juanito; (yellow card) 39' Acasiete; (yellow card) 81' Bruno	Stadium: Camp Nou; Attendance: 79,253; Referee: Miguel Ayza Gámez

31 October 2007 10	Almería	0 – 1	Real Zaragoza	Almería, Spain
19:00	Cobeño (yellow card) 77'	Report	(yellow card) 49' Diogo; (yellow card) 49' García; (yellow card) 51' Sánchez; (yellow card) 52' Oliveira; 78' (pen.) Milito; (yellow card) 80' Luccin	Stadium: Estadio de los Juegos Mediterráneos; Attendance: 13,964; Referee: César Muñiz Fernández

4 November 2007 11	Levante	3 – 0	Almería	Valencia, Spain
16:00	Riganò 1', 16', 34'; Tommasi (yellow card) 52'; Fuego (yellow card) 70'	Report	(yellow card) 81' Melo	Stadium: Ciutat de València; Attendance: 12,950; Referee: Carlos Delgado Ferreiro

11 November 2007 12	Almería	0 – 0	Atlético Madrid	Almería, Spain
16:00	García (yellow card) 33'; Bruno (yellow card) 51'; Juanito (yellow card) 80'; Mané (yellow card) 80'	Report	(yellow card) 39' Agüero; (yellow card) 82' Perea	Stadium: Estadio de los Juegos Mediterráneos; Attendance: 18,000; Referee: Alfonso Pérez

25 November 2007 13	Villarreal	1 – 1	Almería	Villarreal, Spain
16:00	Nihat 13' (yellow card) 79'; Fuentes (yellow card) 14'; Soriano (yellow card) 48'; Ángel Angulo (yellow card) 49'; Cani (yellow card) 84'; Cygan (yellow card) 90'	Report	(yellow card) 47' García; (yellow card) 71' López Rekarte; (yellow card) 80' Juanito; (yellow card) 86' Ju. Ortiz	Stadium: Estadio El Madrigal; Attendance: 15,000; Referee: Carlos Clos

1 December 2007 14	Almería	1 – 0	Sevilla	Almería, Spain
19:00	Mané (yellow card) 43'; López Rekarte (yellow card) 67'; Crusat (yellow card) 74'; Melo (yellow card) 80'; Acasiete 87'; Ju. Ortiz (yellow card) 88'	Report	(yellow card) 44' Poulsen; (yellow card) (yellow-red card) 46' Alves; (yellow card) 72' Martí	Stadium: Estadio de los Juegos Mediterráneos; Attendance: 17,284; Referee: Fernando Teixeira Vitienes

9 December 2007 15	Almería	1 – 0	Real Valladolid	Almería, Spain
16:00	Bruno (yellow card) 47'; Negredo 76'; García (yellow card) 84'; Crusat (yellow card) 90'	Report	(yellow card) 55' Sisi; (red card) 74' García Calvo; (yellow card) 88' Borja Fernández	Stadium: Estadio de los Juegos Mediterráneos; Attendance: 14,320; Referee: Manuel Mejuto González

16 December 2007 16	Real Betis	3 – 1	Almería	Seville, Spain
16:00	Caffa (yellow card) 12'; Ilić (yellow card) 18'; Edu 28' (pen.); Pavone 50', 83'; Capi (yellow card)	Report	10' (pen.) Negredo; (yellow card) (yellow-red card) 14' Acasiete; (red card) 23' Cobeño; (yellow card) Mané; (yellow card) Pulido; (yellow card) Soriano	Stadium: Estadio Manuel Ruiz de Lopera; Attendance: 34,000; Referee: Carlos Velasco Carballo

22 December 2007 17	Almería	0 – 2	Getafe	Almería, Spain
19:00	García (yellow card) 23'; Melo (yellow card) 30'; Uche (yellow card) 56'; Pulido (yellow card) 73'; Crusat (yellow card) (yellow-red card) 77'; Mané (yellow card) 90'	Report	(yellow card) 18' (goal) 85' de la Red; (yellow card) 18' Hernández; (yellow card) 21' Cortés; (yellow card) 29' Díaz; 37' Licht; (yellow card) 39' Abbondanzieri; (yellow card) 63' Pallardó	Stadium: Estadio de los Juegos Mediterráneos; Attendance: 13,476; Referee: Miguel Pérez Lasa

6 January 2008 18	Recreativo de Huelva	1 – 1	Almería	Huelva, Spain
16:00	Sinama Pongolle 13'; Poli (yellow card) 37'; Bouzón (yellow card) 50'	Report	19' Mané; (yellow card) 42' Melo; (yellow card) 49' Negredo; (yellow card) 89' Alves; (yellow card) 90' Pulido	Stadium: Nuevo Colombino; Attendance: 13,198; Referee: Antonio Rubinos Pérez

13 January 2008 19	Almería	1 – 0	Espanyol	Almería, Spain
16:00	Ju. Ortiz (yellow card) 24'; García (yellow card) 57'; Mané (yellow card) 60'; Uche 87'	Report	(yellow card) 42' D. García; (yellow card) 47' Ángel; (yellow card) 78' Lacruz; (yellow card) 89' Hurtado	Stadium: Estadio de los Juegos Mediterráneos; Attendance: 16,000; Referee: Bernardino González Vázquez

20 January 2008 20	Almería	1 – 0	Deportivo La Coruña	Almería, Spain
16:00	Soriano (yellow card) 32'; Pulido 88'	Report	(yellow card) 80' Fabri; (yellow card) 87' de Guzman; (yellow card) 90' Guardado	Stadium: Estadio de los Juegos Mediterráneos; Attendance: 15,000; Referee: Arturo Daudén Ibáñez

27 January 2008 21	Valencia	0 – 1	Almería	Valencia, Spain
16:00	Arizmendi (yellow card) 51'; Moretti (yellow card) 57'; Miguel (yellow card) 86'	Report	21' (yellow card) 34' Melo; (yellow card) 52' Pulido; (yellow card) 65' Jo. Ortiz; (yellow card) 90' Alves	Stadium: Mestalla Stadium; Attendance: 40,000; Referee: Fernando Teixeira Vitienes

2 February 2008 22	Almería	2 – 0	Real Madrid	Almería, Spain
19:00	Juanito 16'; Melo (yellow card) 24'; Alves (yellow card) 27'; Negredo 47' (pen.); Soriano (yellow card) 87'	Report	(yellow card) 28' Casillas; (yellow card) 43' Sneijder; (yellow card) 68' Ramos; (yellow card) 75' Guti	Stadium: Estadio de los Juegos Mediterráneos; Attendance: 21,300; Referee: Carlos Clos

10 February 2008 23	Real Mallorca	0 – 0	Almería	Palma de Mallorca, Spain
16:00	Güiza (yellow card) 44'; Nunes (yellow card) 87'	Report	(yellow card) 9' Ju. Ortiz; (yellow card) 64' Bruno	Stadium: Ono Estadi; Attendance: 22,000; Referee: Miguel Pérez Lasa

17 February 2008 24	Almería	1 – 0	Real Murcia	Almería, Spain
16:00	Pulido (yellow card) 23'; Negredo 43' (yellow card) 80'; Ju. Ortiz (yellow card) 63'; Bruno (yellow card) 68'; Juanito (yellow card) 82'; Mané (yellow card) 90'	Report	(yellow card) 36' Regueiro; (yellow card) 55' García; (yellow card) 64' de Coz; (yellow card) 90' Arzo	Stadium: Estadio de los Juegos Mediterráneos; Attendance: 13,500; Referee: Miguel Ayza Gámez

24 February 2008 25	Racing Santander	1 – 0	Almería	Santander, Spain
16:00	Tchité (yellow card) 42' (goal) 61'; Toño (yellow card) 83'	Report	(yellow card) 39' Juanito; (yellow card) (yellow-red card) 77' Cisma; (yellow card) (yellow-red card) 90' Paunović	Stadium: El Sardinero; Attendance: 18,624; Referee: Francisco Javier Ontanaya López-Astilleros

2 March 2008 26	Almería	1 – 1	Athletic Bilbao	Almería, Spain
20:00	Mané (yellow card) 17'; Melo (yellow card) 36'; Ju. Ortiz (yellow card) 46'; Negredo 59' (pen.); Bruno (yellow card) 74'	Report	(yellow card) 30' Amorebieta; (yellow card) 35' Susaeta; (yellow card) 44' Ocio; (yellow card) 51' Yeste; (yellow card) 56' Etxeberria; (yellow card) 69' Orbaiz; 72' Llorente; (yellow card) 90' Armando	Stadium: Estadio de los Juegos Mediterráneos; Attendance: 14,161; Referee: Alberto Undiano

9 March 2008 27	Osasuna	2 – 1	Almería	Pamplona, Spain
16:00	Sola 5'; Josetxo (yellow card) 14'; Cruchaga 30'; Juanfran (yellow card) 38'; Puñal (yellow card) 82'; Vela (yellow card) 89'	Report	20' (yellow card) 29' Corona; (yellow card) 25' Mané; (yellow card) 32' Melo; (yellow card) 86' Pulido	Stadium: Reyno de Navarra; Attendance: 15,849; Referee: Lizondo Cortés

16 March 2008 28	Almería	2 – 2	Barcelona	Almería, Spain
18:00	Pulido 33'; Uche 85'	Report	17' Bojan; (yellow card) 30' Puyol; 56' Eto'o; (yellow card) 59' Iniesta; (yellow card) 67' Guðjohnsen; (yellow card) (yellow-red card) 70' Milito	Stadium: Estadio de los Juegos Mediterráneos; Attendance: 18,605; Referee: Antonio Rubinos Pérez

23 March 2008 29	Real Zaragoza	1 – 1	Almería	Zaragoza, Spain
16:00	Gabi (yellow card) (yellow-red card) 61'; Oliveira 68'; Ayala (yellow card) 87'	Report	(yellow card) 23' Juanito; (yellow card) 36' Cisma; 88' Negredo; (yellow card) 90' Corona	Stadium: La Romareda; Attendance: 30,000; Referee: Eduardo Iturralde González

30 March 2008 30	Almería	2 – 1	Levante	Almería, Spain
16:00	Soriano 2' (yellow card) 32'; Melo 36'; Pulido (yellow card) 54'; Ju. Ortiz (yellow card) 64'; García (yellow card) 68'	Report	(yellow card) 34' Armando; (yellow card) 83' Gaspar; 90' Iborra	Stadium: Estadio de los Juegos Mediterráneos; Attendance: 21,500; Referee: César Muñiz Fernández

6 April 2008 31	Atlético Madrid	6 – 3	Almería	Madrid, Spain
16:00	López 3'; Forlán 6' (pen.); Simão 34', 45'; Agüero 54', 70' (yellow card) 75'	Report	(red card) 5' Pulido; 11' Melo; 18' Ju. Ortiz; 37' Negredo; (yellow card) (yellow-red card) 40' Juanito; (yellow card) Crusat	Stadium: Vicente Calderón Stadium; Attendance: 54,000; Referee: Alfonso Pérez

13 April 2008 32	Almería	1 – 0	Villarreal	Almería, Spain
20:00	Negredo (penalty missed) 19'; Ju. Ortiz (yellow card) 57'; Crusat (yellow card) 60'; Acasiete 84'; García (yellow card) 90'	Report	(yellow card) 8' Eguren; (red card) 17' López	Stadium: Estadio de los Juegos Mediterráneos; Attendance: 14,330; Referee: Javier Turienzo Álvarez

19 April 2008 33	Sevilla	1 – 4	Almería	Seville, Spain
21:00	Poulsen (yellow card) 22'; Adriano (red card) 64'; Kanouté (penalty missed) 69' 72'; Alves (yellow card) 81'; Keita (yellow card) 86'	Report	(yellow card) 18' Soriano; 24' (o.g.) Alves; (penalty missed) 30' 47', 65' Negredo; (yellow card) 31' (goal) 62' Ju. Ortiz; (yellow card) 84' Pulido	Stadium: Ramón Sánchez Pizjuán; Attendance: 39,000; Referee: Carlos Clos

27 April 2008 34	Real Valladolid	1 – 0	Almería	Valladolid, Spain
16:00	Baraja (yellow card) 40'; Víctor (penalty missed) 43'; Sisi (yellow card) 45'; Camacho (yellow card) 81'; Sesma 90'	Report	(yellow card) 33' Cisma; (yellow card) 87' Crusat	Stadium: José Zorrilla; Attendance: 19,000; Referee: Miguel Ayza Gámez

4 May 2008 35	Almería	1 – 1	Real Betis	Almería, Spain
16:00	Melo (yellow card) 29'; Pulido 47'; Bruno (yellow card) 72'; Acasiete (yellow card) 87'	Report	44' Odonkor; (yellow card) 67' Arzu; (yellow card) 83' Capi	Stadium: Estadio de los Juegos Mediterráneos; Attendance: 14,375; Referee: Eduardo Iturralde González

7 May 2008 36	Getafe	4 – 2	Almería	Getafe, Spain
19:00	Albín 33'; Granero (yellow card) 44' (goal) 76' (pen.); Licht (yellow card) 62' del Moral 63', 69' (yellow card) 70'	Report	4' Crusat; 12' Paunović; (yellow card) 28' Juanito; (yellow card) 75' García; (yellow card) 75' Negredo; (yellow card) 80' Corona; (yellow card) 89' Soriano	Stadium: Coliseum Alfonso Pérez; Attendance: 9,500; Referee: Arturo Daudén Ibáñez

11 May 2008 37	Almería	0 – 2	Recreativo de Huelva	Almería, Spain
20:00	Crusat (yellow card) 45'; Pulido (yellow card) 51'; Soriano (yellow card) 56'; Bruno (yellow card) 57'	Report	24' Vázquez; 43' Sinama Pongolle; (yellow card) (yellow-red card) 45' Bouzón	Stadium: Estadio de los Juegos Mediterráneos; Attendance: 14,000; Referee: Alfonso J. Alvarez Izquierdo

18 May 2008 38	Espanyol	1 – 3	Almería	Barcelona, Spain
20:00	L. García 58' (pen.); Coro (yellow card); Riera (yellow card); Zabaleta (yellow card)	Report	44' Melo; 54' Crusat; 87' Paunović; (yellow card) García; (yellow card) Mané	Stadium: Estadi Olímpic Lluís Companys; Attendance: 22,000; Referee: Miguel Ayza Gámez

=== Copa del Rey ===
==== Round of 32 ====
14 November 2007 1st leg	Levante	2 – 1	Almería	Valencia, Spain
20:30	Mustapha 3', 42'; Gaspar (yellow card) 73'; Miguel Ángel (yellow card) 81'	Report	20' Natalio; (red card) 58' Cabrera; (yellow card) 80' Negredo	Stadium: Ciutat de València; Referee: Arturo Daudén Ibáñez

3 January 2008 2nd leg	Almería	1 – 1	Levante	Almería, Spain
19:30	Pulido 90'	Report	(yellow card) 76' Kujović; (yellow card) 89' Juanma; 90' Álvaro	Stadium: Estadio de los Juegos Mediterráneos; Referee: Francisco Javier Ontanaya López-Astilleros

Levante won 3–2 on aggregate
