= 2002–03 Real Sociedad season =

Real Sociedad
2002–03 season
- Manager: Raynald Denoueix
- La Liga: 2nd
- Copa del Rey: First round
- Top goalscorer: Nihat Kahveci (23)

== Season summary ==
During the 2002–03 season, Real Sociedad were involved in a title race for the first time in decades.

After a series of impressive performances, stretching from September to February the club reached the top of the table. During February and March their league form faltered, and the title challenge looked over. However the club managed to re-establish itself back at the top in April. An emphatic 4–2 defeat of Real Madrid's galacticos at Anoeta in April was the team's signature performance.

The turning point came in early June. Failing to beat Valencia and losing away to Celta de Vigo- who were after a UCL qualification spot- meant that the Guipuscoan club missed on the league trophy. On the last match day a home victory against Atlético Madrid was sterile, as Real Madrid defeated Athletic Bilbao and thus became league champions. A home draw against Villarreal in March is also blamed for this outcome.

The club's fanbase and the entire province paid tribute to the squad regardless of their failure to win the trophy.

== Squad ==
Squad at end of season

Note: Flags indicate national team as defined under FIFA eligibility rules; some limited exceptions apply. Players may hold more than one non-FIFA nationality.

No.	Pos.	Nation	Player
1	GK	ESP	Alberto
2	DF	NOR	Bjørn Tore Kvarme
3	DF	ESP	Agustín Aranzábal
4	MF	ESP	Xabi Alonso
5	DF	ESP	Zuhaitz Gurrutxaga
6	DF	ARG	Gabriel Schurrer
7	DF	ESP	Igor Jauregi
8	MF	TUR	Tayfun Korkut
9	FW	SCG	Darko Kovačević
10	MF	ESP	Javier de Pedro
11	MF	ESP	Mikel Aranburu
12	DF	ESP	José Antonio Pikabea
14	DF	ESP	Aitor López Rekarte

No.	Pos.	Nation	Player
15	FW	TUR	Nihat Kahveci
16	FW	ESP	Joseba Llorente
17	FW	ESP	Igor Gabilondo
19	MF	RUS	Dmitri Khokhlov
20	MF	ESP	José Barkero
21	FW	ESP	Óscar de Paula
23	DF	ESP	Sergio Boris
24	MF	RUS	Valery Karpin
25	GK	NED	Sander Westerveld
28	MF	ESP	Mikel Alonso
29	GK	ESP	Mikel Saizar
37	GK	ESP	Pablo

=== Left club during season ===
Note: Flags indicate national team as defined under FIFA eligibility rules; some limited exceptions apply. Players may hold more than one non-FIFA nationality.

No. / Pos. / Nation / Player; 26 / MF / ESP / Kristian Alberdi (on loan to Real Unión)	No. / Pos. / Nation / Player; 27 / MF / ESP / Gari Uranga (on loan to Eibar)

== Player stats ==
Squad stats
Player	Games played	Full games	Games starting	Used as sub	Minutes	Injuries	Cards	Sent Off	Goals	Penalties
Alberto López Fernández	1	1	1	0	90	0	0	0	0	0
Agustín Aranzábal	32	31	32	0	2879	0	5	0	0	0
José Javier Barkero	11	0	5	6	574	0	1	0	0	0
Sergio Boris González	25	12	15	10	1412	0	1	0	0	0
Óscar de Paula	11	0	0	11	134	0	0	0	0	0
Javier de Pedro	29	7	26	3	2067	0	2	0	6	0
Igor Gabilondo	24	2	8	16	815	0	4	0	1	0
Zuhaitz Gurrutxaga	2	1	1	1	91	0	1	0	0	0
Igor Jauregi	36	32	36	0	3148	0	8	1	1	0
Valery Karpin	36	30	36	0	3186	0	5	0	8	0
Dmitri Khokhlov	18	2	5	13	606	0	1	0	2	0
Darko Kovačević	36	21	36	0	3033	1	6	1	20	2
Bjørn Tore Kvarme	20	18	18	2	1666	0	2	0	0	0
Joseba Llorente	2	0	0	2	19	0	0	0	1	0
Aitor López Rekarte	37	37	37	0	3330	0	8	0	0	0
Mikel Alonso	9	0	1	8	154	0	0	0	1	0
Mikel Aranburu	34	19	27	7	2482	0	7	0	2	0
Nihat Kahveci	35	20	35	0	3002	0	5	1	23	0
Gabriel Schürrer	23	21	23	0	2062	0	3	0	0	0
Tayfun Korkut	22	6	6	16	751	0	1	0	2	0
Sander Westerveld	37	37	37	0	3330	0	1	0	0	0
Xabi Alonso	33	23	33	0	2771	1	8	0	3	0

== Competitions ==
=== La Liga ===
==== League table ====
Pos	Team	Pld	W	D	L	GF	GA	GD	Pts	Qualification or relegation
1	Real Madrid (C)	38	22	12	4	86	42	+44	78	Qualification for the Champions League group stage
2	Real Sociedad	38	22	10	6	71	45	+26	76	Qualification for the Champions League group stage
3	Deportivo La Coruña	38	22	6	10	67	47	+20	72	Qualification for the Champions League third qualifying round
4	Celta Vigo	38	17	10	11	45	36	+9	61	Qualification for the Champions League third qualifying round
5	Valencia	38	17	9	12	56	35	+21	60	Qualification for the UEFA Cup first round

Source: LFP
Rules for classification: 1st points; 2nd head-to-head points; 3rd head-to-head goal difference; 4th head-to-head away goals scored; 5th goal difference; 6th number of goals scored; 7th Fair-play points
(C) Champions

==== Matches ====
1 September 2002 1	Real Sociedad	4–2	Athletic Bilbao	San Sebastián
19:00 CEST	Karpin 27'; Kahveci 32', 61'; Kovačević 75'		Gurpegui 29', 74'	Stadium: Anoeta

15 September 2002 2	Espanyol	1–3	Real Sociedad	Barcelona
18:00 CEST	Tamudo 81'		Kovačević 41', 88'; Aranburu 55'	Stadium: Olímpic Lluís Companys

22 September 2002 3	Real Sociedad	3–3	Real Betis	San Sebastián
20:30 CEST	Rivas 30' (o.g.); Kovačević 57', 79'		Capi 14', 26'; Alfonso 60'	Stadium: Anoeta

29 September 2002 4	Osasuna	2–3	Real Sociedad	Pamplona
19:00 CEST	Puñal 20' (pen.); Rivero 50'		Nihat 12'; Jauregi 51'; Khokhlov 83'	Stadium: El Sadar

6 October 2002 5	Real Sociedad	2–1	Real Valladolid	San Sebastián
18:00 CEST	Nihat 66'; Karpin 68'		Colsa 73'	Stadium: Anoeta

20 October 2002 6	Alavés	2–2	Real Sociedad	Vitoria-Gasteiz
18:00 CEST	Astudillo 4'; Rubén Navarro 86'		Nihat 33'; Karpin 67'	Stadium: Mendizorroza

27 October 2002 7	Real Sociedad	2–1	Racing Santander	San Sebastián
20:30 CET	Kovačević 72' de Pedro 89' (pen.)		Javi Guerrero 22'	Stadium: Anoeta

3 November 2002 8	Villarreal	0–1	Real Sociedad	Vilarreal
18:00 CET			Nihat 35'	Stadium: El Madrigal

9 November 2002 9	Real Sociedad	1–1	Deportivo La Coruña	San Sebastián
20:00 CET	Kovačević 27'		Luque 40'	Stadium: Anoeta

17 November 2002 10	Real Madrid	0–0	Real Sociedad	Madrid
19:00 CET				Stadium: Santiago Bernabéu

22 November 2002 11	Rayo Vallecano	0–0	Real Sociedad	Madrid
21:30 CET				Stadium: Teresa Rivero

1 December 2002 12	Real Sociedad	2–1	Barcelona	San Sebastián
19:00 CET	Kovačević 39', 53'		Kluivert 33'	Stadium: Anoeta

7 December 2002 13	Sevilla	0–1	Real Sociedad	Seville
21:30 CET			Karpin 70'	Stadium: Ramón Sánchez Pizjuán

15 December 2002 14	Real Sociedad	2–1	Mallorca	San Sebastián
17:00 CET	de Pedro 51'; Aranburu 57'		Eto'o 47'	Stadium: Anoeta

22 December 2002 15	Recreativo Huelva	1–3	Real Sociedad	Huelva
17:00 CET	Raúl Molina 39'		Nihat 41', 56'; Llorente 90'	Stadium: Nuevo Colombino

5 January 2003 16	Real Sociedad	2–2	Málaga	San Sebastián
17:00 CET	Nihat 7'; Khokhlov 24'		Musampa 20'; Darío Silva 56'	Stadium: Anoeta

11 January 2003 17	Valencia	2–2	Real Sociedad	Valencia
21:30 CET	Fábio Aurélio 19'; Aranzábal 60' (o.g.)		Kovačević 68'; Nihat 79'	Stadium: Mestalla

18 January 2003 18	Real Sociedad	1–0	Celta de Vigo	San Sebastián
20:00 CET	de Pedro 64'			Stadium: Anoeta

25 January 2003 19	Atlético Madrid	1–2	Real Sociedad	Madrid
21:30 CET	Luis García 48'		Korkut 46'; Kovačević 72'	Stadium: Vicente Calderón

2 February 2003 20	Athletic Bilbao	3–0	Real Sociedad	Bilbao
20:30 CET	Etxeberria 18', 75'; Ezquerro 90'			Stadium: San Mamés

9 February 2003 21	Real Sociedad	0–0	Espanyol	San Sebastián
17:00 CET				Stadium: Anoeta

16 February 2003 22	Real Betis	3–2	Real Sociedad	Seville
20:30 CET	Fernando 11', 90' (pen.); Filipescu 86'		Nihat 73', 77'	Stadium: Manuel Ruiz de Lopera

23 February 2003 23	Real Sociedad	2–0	Osasuna	San Sebastián
17:00 CET	Kovačević 42'; Aranburu 64'			Stadium: Anoeta

2 March 2003 24	Real Valladolid	3–0	Real Sociedad	Valladolid
17:00 CET	Oliveira 1', 8'; Óscar 21'			Stadium: José Zorrilla

9 March 2003 25	Real Sociedad	3–1	Alavés	San Sebastián
20:30 CET	Kovačević 16'; Nihat 39'; Karpin 43'		Rubén Navarro 83' (pen.)	Stadium: Anoeta

15 March 2003 26	Racing Santander	1–2	Real Sociedad	Santander
20:30 CET	Benayoun 4'		Nihat 22'; Karpin 60'	Stadium: El Sardinero

23 March 2003 27	Real Sociedad	2–2	Villarreal	San Sebastián
17:00 CET	Kovačević 14', 15' (pen.)		Víctor 88'; Jorge López 90'	Stadium: Anoeta
