= 2005–06 UE Lleida season =

UE Lleida
2005–06 season
- President: Miquel Pons
- Manager: Miguel Rubio
- Grounds: Camp d'Esports
- Segunda División: 19th
- Copa del Rey: Fourth Round
- Ciutat de Lleida Trophy: Champion
- Top goalscorer: League: Mate Bilić (18); All: Mate Bilić (19)

This is a complete list of appearances by members of the professional playing squad of UE Lleida during the 2005–06 season.

No.		Player	Pos	Lge Apps	Lge Gls	Cup Apps	Cup Gls	Tot Apps	Tot Gls	Date signed	Previous club
Goalkeepers
1	(Spain)	Eduardo Navarro	GK	11	-	1	-	12	-	2002	Binéfar
13	(Spain)	David Rangel	GK	27	-	3	-	30	-	2003	Valencia
30	(Spain)	Miguel Martínez	GK	4	-	-	-	4	-	2006	Zaragoza
Defenders
3	(Spain)	Xavier Pelegrí	DF	19 (1)	-	3	-	22 (1)	-	2003	Cacereño
4	(Spain)	Txema Alonso	DF	25 (3)	-	1	-	26 (3)	-	2003	Getafe
5	(Spain)	José Antonio Dorado	DF	13 (2)	-	3	-	16 (2)	-	2004	Zaragoza B
7	(Spain)	Dani Marín	DF	35	-	2	-	37	-	2002	Nàstic
14	(Spain)	Bruno Saltor	DF	39	-	0 (4)	-	39 (4)	-	2003	Espanyol B
18	(Spain)	Juan Povedano	DF	16 (3)	-	-	-	16 (3)	-	2005	Ponferradina
20	(Spain)	Unai Vergara	DF	16 (1)	1	2	-	18 (1)	1	2005	Elche
25	(Spain)	Óscar Rubio	DF	31 (10)	4	4	-	35 (10)	4	2004	Tàrrega
Midfielders
2	(Spain)	Jacobo Ynclán	MF	21 (13)	1	0 (2)	-	21 (15)	1	2005	Poli Ejido
8	(Spain)	Ramón Ros	MF	5 (11)	1	3	-	8 (11)	1	2005	Numancia
10	(Spain)	Diego Carrillo	MF	0 (3)	-	4	1	4 (3)	1	2005	L'Hospitalet
11	(Spain)	Juanjo Camacho	MF	11 (4)	-	-	-	11 (4)	-	2005	Zaragoza
15	(Spain)	Juanlu Hens	MF	23	1	-	-	23	1	2005	Valencia
17	(Spain)	Rubén García	MF	37 (2)	-	1 (2)	-	38 (4)	-	2002	Fraga
21	(Spain)	Sergio Rodríguez	MF	34 (3)	2	0 (2)	1	34 (5)	3	2001	Balaguer
26	(Spain)	Albert Urrea	MF	0 (1)	-	-	-	0 (1)	-	2004	Academy
-	(Spain)	Juanma Cruz	MF	3 (5)	1	2	-	5 (5)	1	2005	Sabadell
-	(Spain)	Rodri	MF	-	-	3	-	3	-	2005	Huesca
-	(Spain)	Manuel Lanzarote	MF	5 (3)	-	4	-	9 (3)	-	2005	Barça Atlètic
Forwards
9	(Spain)	Nakor Bueno	CF	13 (22)	4	0 (1)	-	13 (23)	4	2000	Barça Atlètic
16	(Brazil)	Luiz Carlos de Souza	CF	0 (7)	-	3	3	3 (7)	3	2005	Coritiba
19	(Spain)	Eneko Romo	CF	5 (17)	-	4	1	9 (17)	1	2005	Rayo Vallecano
22	(Croatia)	Mate Bilić	CF	33 (7)	18	1 (1)	1	34 (8)	19	2005	Córdoba
27	(Portugal)	Nuno Carvalho	CF	0 (2)	-	-	-	0 (2)	-	2005	Academy
