= Poveda =

Poveda may refer to:

- Poveda (surname), a surname
- Poveda de las Cintas, a municipality located in the province of Salamanca, Castile and León, Spain
- Poveda de la Sierra, a municipality located in the province of Guadalajara, Castile-La Mancha, Spain
- La Póveda de Soria, a municipality located in the province of Soria, Castile and León, Spain
- Poveda, Ávila, a municipality located in the province of Ávila, Castile and León, Spain

== See also ==
- Povedano
- Pobeda (disambiguation)
- Povoda
