= Povedano =

Povedano is a surname. Notable people with this name include the following:

- Juan Povedano (born 1979), a Spanish retired footballer, central defender
- Silvia Lara Povedano (born 1959), a Costa Rican politician and sociologist
- Tomás Povedano (1847—1943), a Spanish painter

== See also ==
- Poveda
- Poveda (surname)
