= Rewilding Europe =

Netherlands-based non-profit organisation

Rewilding Europe is a non-profit organization based in Nijmegen, the Netherlands, dedicated to creating rewilded landscapes throughout Europe. The group's efforts have contributed to increasing the stock of previously endangered species such as the European bison and the Iberian lynx.

== History ==
Rewilding Europe was formally established on June 28, 2011, as an independent, non-profit foundation (ANBI status) registered in the Netherlands. The four co-founders of Rewilding Europe are Frans Schepers, Staffan Widstrand, Neil Birnie, and Wouter Helmer.

The organization has received funding from the European Investment Bank and the Endangered Landscapes Programme.

== Locations ==
Rewilding Europe is actively engaged in ten rewilding areas located in 12 European countries.

=== Greater Côa Valley rewilding area ===
The Greater Côa Valley rewilding area is located in Portugal, in the Côa Valley, along the border with Spain. Here, Rewilding Europe is trying to increase the number of semi-wild livestock, such as feral horses and cows. Due to depopulation and land abandonment, there has been a significant decrease in grazing, which has caused natural succession and more plant cover in the landscapes. The organization promotes grazing as a tool to lower the risk of fire. The organization claims more "wild" livestock will lead to more diverse "mosaic landscapes", which may improve conditions for populations of roe deer and other species, including some that are extinct in the region, such as the Iberian ibex. Besides the promotion of conservation grazing, the organization is also occupied with promoting ecotourism, advocacy to convince the Portuguese government to set aside more land to create a biological corridor, and a project to increase the number of wolves in the area.

=== Danube Delta rewilding area ===
The 580,000-hectare Danube Delta is home to massive amounts of water birds, most notably pelicans of two species, herons, storks, cormorants, and terns. It is a favourite staging area for passage migrants and wintering grounds for masses of migrating water birds from the steppes, the boreal forests, and the tundras further north. The region has some of Europe's few remaining grazed mosaic forest landscapes, kept in their natural state by the wild horses and wild cattle still present. Working with partners, the Rewilding Danube Delta team is working to significantly improve the ecological integrity and natural functioning of 40,000 hectares of wetland and terrestrial delta habitat, using rewilding principles on a landscape scale. Revitalised and self-governing natural processes, particularly flooding and natural grazing, will govern landscape formation, driving other natural processes, wildlife comeback, increased biodiversity, and the development of a nature-based economy. The Danube Delta rewilding area is part of the Tauros breeding programme, managed by the Taurus Foundation and Rewilding Europe. The programme aims to breed a cattle breed that resembles the aurochs by establishing viable free-ranging populations of cattle in several European locations. Due to translocations in 2016 and 2017, the number of Tauros cattle grazing near Sfântu Gheorghe, Tulcea is now 18 animals. Rewilding Europe works to create new opportunities for delta communities by supporting the development of nature-based business. 2019 saw the release of a water buffalo herd as a proxy for Bubalus murrensis; and 2020, of a Turkmenian kulan herd (a species present in European Russia until the 18th or 19th century, and close relative of the Western European wild ass that became extinct in the Chalcolithic).

=== Southern Carpathians rewilding area ===
The Southern Carpathians were considered a good place for nature conservation work. Rewilding Europe has concentrated on part of the region which counts more than 1 million hectares of protected areas already in place, rich wildlife, large intact forests, a high concentration of biodiversity, relatively intact wild landscapes, wild rivers, and large areas of mosaic vegetation largely shaped by traditional farming and grazing practices.

The work of Rewilding Europe and its partners is focused on bringing back the European bison. Since 2013, Rewilding Europe and WWF Romania have been working together in the Southern Carpathians rewilding area to reintroduce this iconic species. The major objective of this ongoing project is to create a demographically and genetically viable population in the Southern Carpathians, comprising free-roaming sub-populations in the Țarcu Mountains and nearby Poiana Ruscă Mountains.

So far, following bison releases in 2014 and 2015, in June 2016, a third bison release took place as part of the European Commission-funded LIFE Bison project, with a fourth release of nine animals taking place in April 2017. Rewilding Europe and WWF Romania have been working together to create one of the largest contiguous wild areas in Europe.

=== Velebit rewilding area ===
Situated on a mountain chain on the Adriatic coast in Croatia, the Velebit rewilding area is one of the wildest areas of the whole Mediterranean. The area hosts two national parks, a biosphere reserve, several hiking trails, old-growth forests, deep canyons, ancient open lands and wildlife like Balkan chamois, red deer, brown bear, wolf, and lynx.

Many local inhabitants have moved out of the area towards the coast. As a result, many areas of this region are now characterized by land abandonment, rural exodus and fading cultural tradition. Rewilding Europe is working with its partners to transform challenges into opportunities. This has seen the establishment of the 17,000-hectare Velebit Nature Reserve, situated between two large national parks. Here rewilding is offering a fresh approach to wildlife management and underpinning the development of a local nature-based economy, creating a wildlife and ecological corridor in the Velebit mountains.

Wildlife-watching hides are constructed and it is planned that new ones will be built in future to create job opportunities benefiting the local community. In collaboration with the University of Zagreb's Faculty of Forestry, the Rewilding Velebit team are working to have the Ramino Korito old-growth beech forest, located in the southern part of Velebit Mountains, designated a special woodland reserve, highlighting its rarity and biological value. On the Lika Plains, a grassland located in the foothills of the Velebit Mountains, Rewilding Europe is working to reintroduce wild and semi-wild grazers. Since it began in 2015 the project has doubled in size and now extends across 1000 hectares.

On 10 December 2014 experienced Croatian hiker Zdenko Đanić was killed by a Sayaguesa bull which the project had imported. The shepherd was present but rescuers reached the injured hiker too late due to the remote location.

=== Central Apennines rewilding area ===
The Central Apennines are characterized by a rich diversity of ecosystems and therefore also wildlife species. The work of Rewilding Europe and its partners in Central Apennines focuses on developing large "coexistence corridors" by connecting the local economy with wilder nature in four corridors collectively covering more than 40,000 hectares.

In the protected areas (the Abruzzo and Majella National Parks and Sirente-Velino Regional Park) the corridors are intended to benefit the wildlife populations and the quality of nature and nature-related experiences. The 10-year project's goal is to reduce bear mortality and conflict by installing traffic accident prevention measures, removing old fencing, restoring and improving signage, and distributing new mobile electric fences. Furthermore, Rewilding Europe and its partners work on supporting nature-based enterprises in and around corridor areas, and raising awareness about wildlife and nature conservation amongst local communities and people visiting the area.

=== The Rhodope Mountains rewilding area ===
The Rhodope Mountains are the only breeding area for griffon vultures in Bulgaria and also the most important breeding site for the globally threatened Egyptian vulture on the Balkan Peninsula. The work of Rewilding Europe focuses on restoring food chains in the Rhodope Mountains. Restoring natural food chains is a flagship project of Rewilding Europe, supported by the European Commission through the LIFE project "Conservation of black and griffon vultures in the cross-border Rhodope mountains". Rewilding Europe's main focus is to help vultures and other scavenging species by boosting the availability of wild herbivore carcasses, thereby closing the circle of life.

Together with local partners Rewilding Europe is increasing the number of local ungulates through several annual red deer and fallow deer releases, with reintroduced animal behaviour monitored through the use of GPS collars. Rewilding Europe is boosting biodiversity through mosaic landscape creation. Together with partners, Rewilding Europe is creating space for natural processes like forest regeneration, free-flowing rivers, herbivory, and carnivory to impact ecosystems. Rewilding Europe and Rewilding Rhodope extends its efforts to restore steppe habitat, and increase the population of the endangered European ground squirrel.

=== Oder Delta rewilding area ===
The Oder Delta region is a unique combination of a rich mosaic of large and wild continental, marine, and freshwater ecosystems in Germany and Poland. The transboundary region stretches over more than 250,000 hectares, of which nearly 70,000 hectares are the open waters of the lagoon. Rewilding Europe, nature conservation organisations and local partners have started working on several pilot conservation and sustainable development projects here in 2013, based on the exploration of nature-based economic opportunities. A professional non-profit organization in the form of a registered association Rewilding Oder Delta e.V. has been established and registered in Germany in 2019 to facilitate this cooperation and to develop further projects for the benefit of nature and people in the region.

The eventual aim is to restore and safeguard regional nature and to develop alternative, sustainable and nature-friendly models of land, freshwater and sea use with local landowners, entrepreneurs, communities and residents. The Oder Delta team is working with partners to boost biodiversity in the delta by improving habitats and their connectivity, rewilding rivers, restoring sensitive peatlands and alluvial areas, supporting sustainable wildlife comeback, and a local nature-based economy.

=== Swedish Lapland rewilding area ===
Currently working in collaboration with fishing associations on both the Råne and Piteå, Rewilding Lapland is now working hard to boost fish migration through activities such as spawning ground restoration and the removal of artificial obstacles. Sonar-based fish counters are used on both rivers to measure results. Together with river restoration, Rewilding Lapland is exploring new nature-based business opportunities, providing support to enterprises involved in fishing and otter watching on the lower Råne River.

Rewilding Lapland and local partners support guided reindeer migration, raising awareness of these threats and supporting Sami communities in their fight for traditional grazing rights. Rewilding Lapland collaborates with Sami communities to develop wildlife-watching businesses and guided reindeer tourism. The Rewilding Lapland team and partners are working to grow a local nature-based economy and reduce human-wildlife conflict.

=== Iberian Highlands ===
The Iberian Highlands rewilding landscape is located in the Alto Tajo Nature Reserve and the Serranía de Cuenca mountains in central Spain, forming an 850,000 hectares (2,100,000 acres) mountainous area consisting of river canyons, steppe prairie, pine, oak, and juniper forests, and farmland. The selected area had undergone significant land abandonment as a result of rural depopulation, which reduced both the local population density, which dropped to fewer than two people per square kilometre, and the numbers of the sheep herds that had been historically grazed in the area. The lowered human footprint favoured the reestablishment of roe, fallow, and red deer, wild boar, European mouflon, and small herds of Iberian ibex, alongside griffon vultures and the largest population of Egyptian vultures in Europe. Rewilding Europe's programs in this area are primarily focused on the introduction of large grazers and predators.

In 2021, 17 cinereous vultures, which vanished from the area in the 1920s, were reintroduced to forested areas within the highlands.

In September 2023, a herd of ten Przewalski's horses obtained from Monts d'Azur Biological Reserve in France was introduced. The horses are intended to fill a niche similar to that of the extinct European wild horse by opening the landscape through low-intensity grazing and browsing, thus enhancing biodiversity and lowering the risk of forest fires. Future introductions are planned to supplement the starting herd's genetic diversity and the species' low rate of reproduction. Other areas of the park are being used to host semi-wild Serrano horses alongside Tauros cattle, a breed intended to resemble the extinct aurochs.

An experimental release of Iberian lynx is planned for the end of 2023. Local rabbit populations have fallen significantly due to the use of disease as pest control. As rabbits are the lynx's primary source of food, the release is intended to determine whether the lynxes will be able to switch to a different source of prey, such as young deer.

A proposal has been made to establish a natural park around the gorges formed by the Tagus River, which would prohibit hunting, fishing, and logging but permit traditional agriculture. This has faced resistance from hunters and municipalities who depend on wild game and hunting permits, respectively, as sources of revenue.

The rewilding programs are planned to cooperate with local communities to establish sustainable farming and ecotourism. This is hoped to both bolster the local economy and form goodwill with established societies.

== Rewilding Europe tools ==
Rewilding Europe uses several tools to support its activities.

=== European Rewilding Network ===
European Rewilding Network (ERN) is an online network set up to connect areas in the continent where rewilding efforts are taking place, including both the core Rewilding Europe locations as well as many other sites with externally run projects. Promoting the sharing of knowledge and experience between the many projects and locations is the main goal of the network. The tools ERN uses are Online Seminars (webinars) held quarterly on various rewilding topics. ERN forum, open and free to all members, this online platform is used to post questions and information, interact at any time, and view previous webinars on a wide range of rewilding-related topics. ERN Bridge, is a virtual bridge set up in hopes to close the gap between the needs of the vast numbers of rewilding initiatives with students and volunteers searching to gain experience by working in nature conservation and rewilding. Direct access to Rewilding Europe Capital (REC), Europe's first ‘rewilding enterprise’ funding facility that provides financial loans to new and existing businesses that catalyse, support and achieve positive environmental and socio-economic outcomes that support rewilding in Europe. ERN members are eligible for direct access to the European Wildlife Bank, a tool designed to facilitate the reintroduction and restocking of herbivores to rewilding areas across the European continent.

=== Rewilding Europe Capital ===
Rewilding Europe Capital (REC) is the first ‘rewilding enterprise’ funding facility that provides financial loans to new and existing businesses that catalyse, support and achieve positive environmental and socio-economic outcomes that support rewilding in Europe.

European Investment Bank provided Rewilding Europe Capital with a 6 million euro loan finance contract. It is the first project of the “Bank on Nature Initiative”, set up by the European Commission. The signing ceremony took place in the Berlaymont Building, the headquarters of the European Commission in Brussels. REC forms part of the enterprise component of Rewilding Europe, which is working to build a business case for wild nature in Europe. REC was established to positively stimulate enterprise economies connected to natural landscapes and their wildlife. REC achieves this by providing commercial business loans to businesses that can: positively address negative socio-economic impacts caused by rural land abandonment; directly and indirectly support rewilding processes and activities in Europe and to those that deliver economic returns from nature and wildlife-related sectors that also work to conserve natural landscapes, capital, and rural cultures and heritage connected to them. By 2018 Rewilding Europe in total loaned out to 18 enterprises the sum of 520,000 euros.

=== European Wildlife Bank ===
European Wildlife Bank (EWB) a tool Rewilding Europe uses to help bring back more natural numbers of the original native herbivores in our rewilding areas. These big grazers and browsers play key roles in the natural functioning of Europe's ecosystems. Tauros cattle, native horses and European bison are examples of the species involved in the European Wildlife Bank. European Wildlife Bank developed a database for all the animals in the bank. This includes information on births and deaths in all relevant areas across Europe, the start and end dates of contracts, the yearly availability of animals, and the demand for animals from new rewilding areas. By 2018 Rewilding Europe signed 16 contracts with partner organisations in nine countries.

=== Rewilding Europe policy work ===
Titled "Making Space for Rewilding: Creating an enabling policy environment" is a policy brief written in 2016 by Paul Jepson, Course Director at the School of Geography and Environment at the University of Oxford and Frans Schepers, Managing Director of Rewilding Europe. The brief was written to make rewilding widely acceptable and recognizable as an innovative conservation method. The brief communicates that rewilding as such represents a growing movement in Europe and has attained scientific, practical, and media presence. The interviews have been conducted with ten experts from the field of EU nature and legislation and in rewilding to explore the opportunities to create a policy environment that would support fuller expression of rewilding visions and principles.

With the help of this brief, Rewilding Europe works on getting support to enable the environment for rewilding in its nature conservation and land-use policies. Four main targets to be implemented in the EU policy are: 1) recognizing rewilding as a new conservation approach emerging from the inter-disciplinary conservation science interacting with currents in culture and society, 2) positioning rewilding as a complementary approach with the potential to extend the scope and impact of the EU nature policy cost-effectively, supporting better implementation of the Nature Directives, and 3) undertakings to support and invest in rewilding initiatives and studies and engage in dialogue with the rewilding movement in preparation for the 2030 biodiversity strategy.

In March 2017, a coalition of five organisations kicked off a new initiative to promote and strengthen the EU ecological restoration agenda. By signing a Memorandum of Understanding, Rewilding Europe, BirdLife Europe, and Central Asia, WWF European Policy Office, the European Environmental Bureau, and the German Institute for Integrative Biodiversity Research (iDiv), launched this 3-year initiative funded by WWF Netherlands. The overall aim of the project is to strengthen the EU restoration agenda and ensure that specific actions are taken to create a coherent ecological network in Europe, by promoting and using rewilding principles.

Similarly, in 2020, the WWF, The Rivers Trust, The Nature Conservancy, The European Rivers Network, Rewilding Europe, Wetlands International Europe, and The World Fish Migration Foundation have formed a coalition to restore Europe's rivers and streams to their natural state.

=== Rewilding Europe publications ===
Since its establishment, Rewilding Europe has published annual reviews covering its activities, achievements in rewilding areas, specific ten-year objectives, news about rewilding, nature-based economies, nature-based tourism, wild nature, and more.

=== Rewilding Europe's Work with Universities ===
Rewilding Europe engages with many European universities, as rewilding is a future-oriented, long-term conservation approach, which requires raising awareness of the younger generations. Some of the universities with which Rewilding Europe has good connections are Oxford, Cambridge, Leipzig, Madrid, Amsterdam, Zagreb, and Warsaw.

== See also ==
- Pleistocene rewilding
- Rewilding Britain
- Passive rewilding
