= Alberto Hernández =

Alberto Hernández may refer to:

- Alberto Hernández (outfielder) (born 1917), Cuban professional baseball player
- Alberto Hernández (catcher) (born 1969), Cuban baseball player
- Alberto Hernández (footballer) (born 1977), Spanish footballer
