= Alto Tajo Nature Reserve =

Protected area in Spain

- IUCN category II (national park)
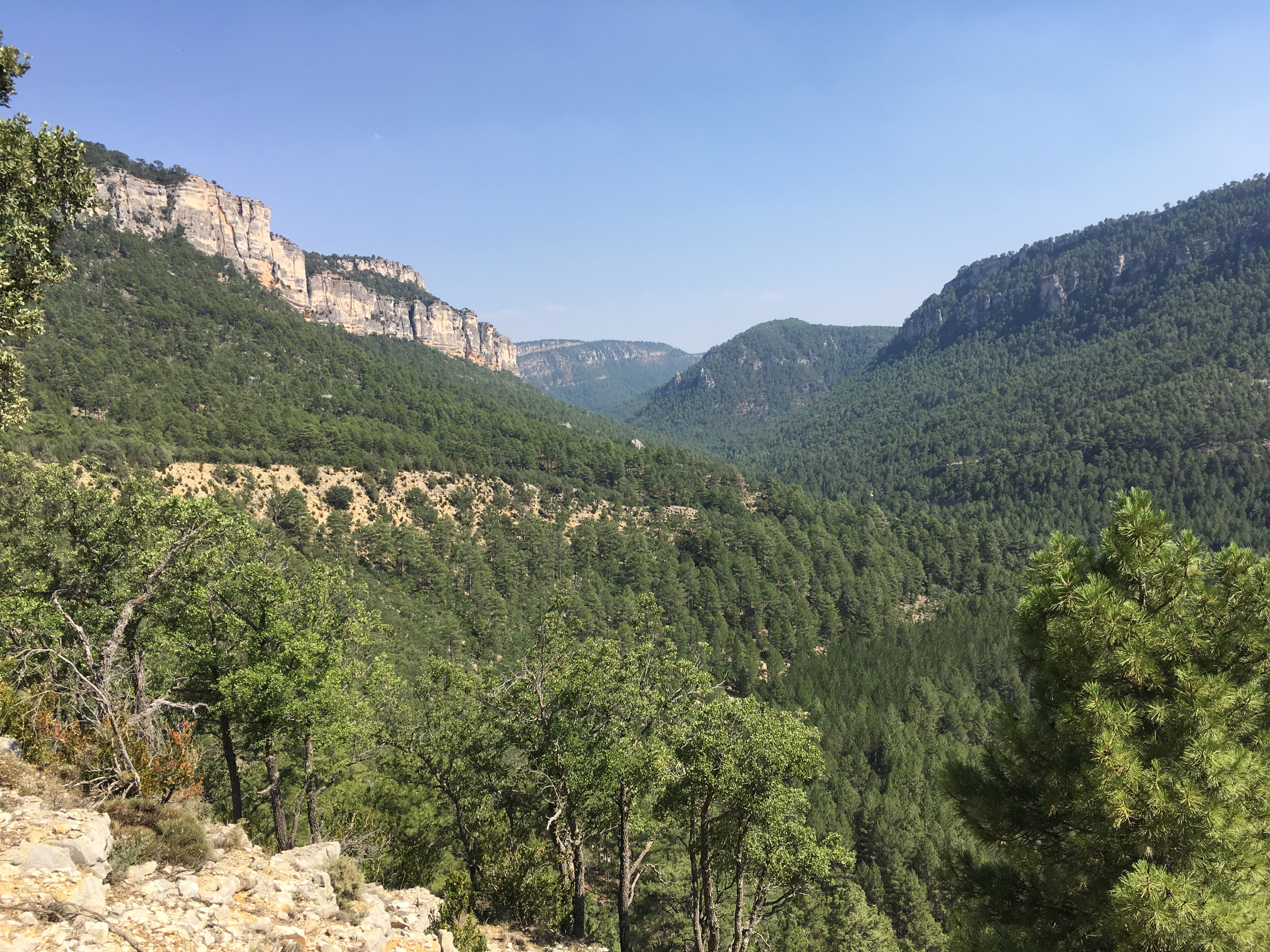
- Tagus river gorge
- Interactive map of Alto Tajo Nature Reserve
- Location: Spain
- Coordinates: 40°41′N 02°03′W
- Area: 1,056.24 km^{2} (261,003 acres)

Alto Tajo Nature Reserve (Spanish: Parque natural del Alto Tajo) is a Natural Reserve in Guadalajara Province of Spain. The park is famous for its canyons and gorges formed by the Tagus river and its tributaries which flow through the park, besides its pine forests and imposing cliffs. The park provides the setting for José Luis Sampedro's novel El río que nos lleva (1961). The park was also one of the filming locations of Game of Thrones (season 6).

== Mining ==
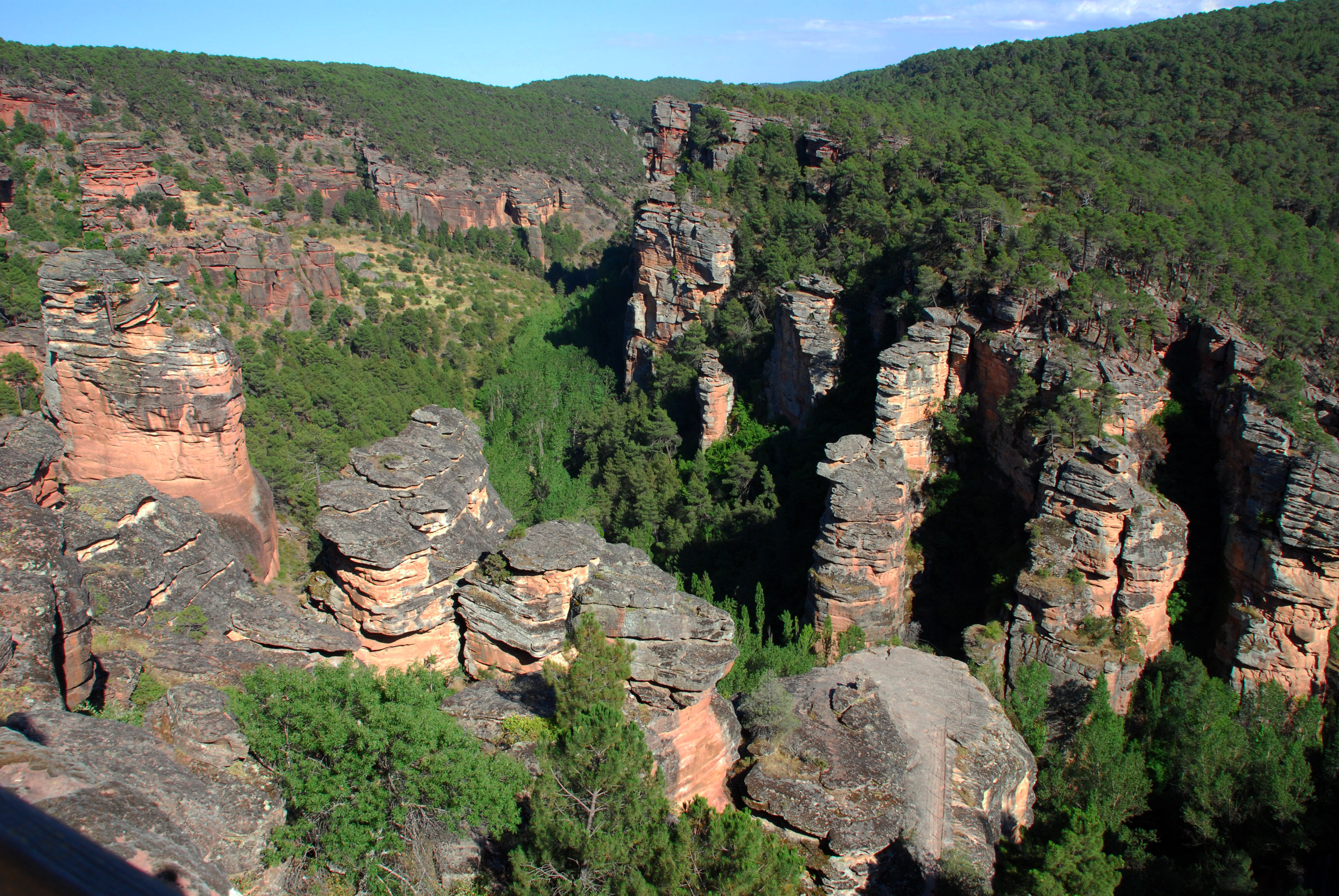
The canyons in the park

The park has been threatened by kaolinite mining, with the government finding it hard to regulate as it contributes to 13.5% of all the jobs in the area and because kaolinite is considered an important mineral in the national economy as it is a raw material in many industries. Currently, two mines are operational in Poveda de la Sierra which affects an area of around 100 hectares. There is also an open mine in Peñalén, where mining has been put on hold. Mining in the area began in the 1960s with an English multinational company called ECC being the sole miner for 20 years before they pulled out of the country. The present mining companies hold a mining right for 90 years and have been reluctant to stop mining without proper compensation. The runoffs from the mines are polluting the Tagus River, besides affecting the fauna in the river.
