= Álex Quillo =

Spanish footballer

Personal information
- Full name: Alejandro Rodríguez Rivas
- Date of birth: 7 October 1986 (age 40)
- Place of birth: La Línea, Spain
- Height: 1.82 m (6 ft 0 in)
- Position: Midfielder

Youth career
- 2000–2006: Atlético Madrid

Senior career*
Years	Team	Apps	(Gls)
2006–2007	Atlético Madrid C		
2007–2009	Atlético Madrid B	58	(8)
2009–2010	Almería	1	(0)
2010–2012	Recreativo	25	(2)
2013	Lucena	11	(0)
2013	Chania	0	(0)
2014	Lucena	7	(1)
2015	Mairena	7	(0)
2016–2022	Europa	118	(29)
2023	Mons Calpe	5	(0)
- * Club domestic league appearances and goals

Alejandro Rodríguez Rivas (born 7 October 1986), known as Álex Quillo, is a Spanish former footballer who played as a midfielder.

== Football career ==
Born in La Línea de la Concepción, Province of Cádiz, Quillo joined Atlético Madrid's youth system in 2000, aged 13. After one game in 2006–07 with the B-team, he went on to appear a further two full seasons for the reserves also in the third division. In the 2007–08 edition of the Copa del Rey he played his first official game with the main squad (in a total of two), a 2–1 away win against Granada 74 CF.

In late August 2009, Quillo joined La Liga club UD Almería. His input in the competition consisted of 15 minutes in a 2–3 home loss to Sevilla FC in the campaign's last round, finishing his spell with three official matches.

On 2 July 2010, Quillo signed a two-year contract with Recreativo de Huelva in the second level, In the following years, he rarely settled with a team or received significant playing time, competing in his country's third level but also in Tercera División.

In early 2016, Quillo joined Europa F.C. in the Gibraltar Premier Division. He scored eight times in 24 games in his first full season, helping the club secure its first title since 1952. On 27 June 2017, he netted their first-ever goal in the UEFA Champions League, in a 2–1 win at The New Saints for the first qualifying round; he was, however, sent off in the second leg, which ended with a 1–3 loss and the subsequent elimination.
