= Pobeda =

Pobeda may refer to:

== Places ==
=== Antarctica ===
- Pobeda Ice Island, an island of Antarctica

=== Bulgaria ===
- Pobeda, Dobrich Province
- Pobeda, a neighbourhood of Burgas, Burgas Province

=== Kyrgyzstan ===
- Peak Pobeda, or Pik Pobedy, a mountain in the Tian Shan mountain range

=== Kazakhstan ===
- Pobeda, Kazakhstan, former name of Shalkar village, Karaganda Region

=== Moldova ===
- Pobeda, a village in Colosova, Grigoriopol, Transnistria
- Pobeda, a village in Lenin, Transnistria

=== Russia ===
- Pobeda, Kamennomostskoye, a settlement in Maykopsky District
- Pobeda, Leningrad Oblast, a rural locality in Leningrad Oblast
- Pobeda, Pobedenskoye, a settlement in Maykopsky District
- Pobeda railway station, a station in Moscow Oblast
- Pobeda (Samara Metro), a station in Sovetsky district, Samara
- Peak Pobeda, Sakha, a mountain in Sakha Republic

=== Serbia ===
- Pobeda (Bačka Topola), a village in the Bačka Topola municipality, Vojvodina province, Serbia
- Pobeda, part of Radna Zona Istok (Work Zone East), one of the industrial zones in Novi Sad

== Other uses ==
- Pobeda (airline), a low-cost airline in Russia
- Pobeda (watch), a Russian brand of wrist-watches
- 1908 Pobeda, a minor planet
- FK Pobeda, a disambiguation page about football clubs in North Macedonia
- GAZ-M20 Pobeda, a Soviet car
- Russian battleship Pobeda, a ship which took part in the Russo-Japanese War (1904–05)
- Pobeda 1946, a 2016 novel by Ilmar Taska

== See also ==
- "Den Pobedy", a Russian Second World War song
- Victory Day (9 May)
- Popeda, a Finnish rock band
- Poveda
