= Leonardo Borzani =

Argentine retired footballer

Personal information
- Full name: Leonardo Luis Borzani
- Date of birth: 7 May 1982 (age 44)
- Place of birth: Álvarez, Argentina
- Height: 1.79 m (5 ft 10 in)
- Position: Midfielder

Youth career
- Rosario Central

Senior career*
Years	Team	Apps	(Gls)
2003–2009	Rosario Central	122	(8)
2009–2010	Almería	3	(0)
2011	Las Palmas	3	(0)
2012–2013	Guillermo Brown	17	(0)
2013–2016	Sportivo Belgrano	75	(0)
2016–2017	Central Córdoba	0	(0)
- * Club domestic league appearances and goals

Leonardo Luis Borzani (born 7 May 1982 in Álvarez, Santa Fe) is an Argentine retired footballer who played as a midfielder.

== Career ==
Borzani made his first team debut in 2003 and went on to establish himself as a regular member of the first team squad. In 2009, he was released by Rosario Central on 20 October 2009 UD Almería have signed the Argentine midfielder.
