= Staffan Widstrand =

Swedish Photographer and author

- Born: Carl Staffan Fredrik Widstrand; 1959 (age 66–67)
- Occupations: Photographer, writer
- Years active: 1981–present
- Awards: Wildlife Photographer of the Year; WWF Sweden Panda book of the Year; European Nature Photographer of the Year; Nature Photographer of the Year in Sweden; De Gouden Wimpel (The Golden Streamer award), The Netherlands
- Website: www.staffanwidstrand.se

Staffan Widstrand (born 1959) is a Swedish photographer and author based in Stockholm, Sweden.

== Early life and education ==
Widstrand was born in Sweden in 1959. He also served as a reserved officer in the Swedish Armoured Troops Corps. In 1984, he founded his photography company Staffan Widstrand Photography in Järfälla, Stockholm. Between 1984 and 1990, Widstrand worked as a picture editor at Natur & Kultur. His work often highlights aspects of the planet's natural heritage with the aim of raising awareness and encouraging its protection. He is a National Geographic Explorer since 2008 and a Sony Imaging Brand Ambassador since 2020. Between 1997 and 2020, Widstrand served as a brand ambassador for Nikon. He is also a member of Naturfotograferna, the Swedish nature photographers association.

Widstrand has co-founded or led several communication and conservation initiatives. These include Ajunngilaq (1994–1998), a project on contemporary life in the Arctic, Big Five (1998–2003), focusing on Sweden's large carnivores, which developed into the Swedish National Carnivore Information Centre “De 5 Stora” in Järvsö; Wild Wonders of Europe (2007–2012); Rewilding Europe (2011–), where he was Director of Communications (2011–2015); and Wild Wonders of China (2012–). He also co-founded the Swedish Nature- and Ecotourism Association (1996–) and contributed to the development of its “Nature’s Best” quality label in 2002. More recently, he co-founded the carnivore-related initiatives Sweden’s Big Five (2023–2025) and Living Side by Side (2025).

== Exhibitions ==
Widstrand's major exhibitions include Ajunngilaq – Arctic Moments (1997–2002), Scandinavian Big Five Carnivores (2000–2006), Wild Sweden (2007–2009), Wild Wonders of Europe (2008–2013), Rewilding the Danube Delta (2013), and Wild Wonders of China (2016–). His work has been shown in venues such as Stockholm, Oslo, Berlin, Prague, Madrid, The Hague, Beijing, Shanghai, and Washington, among others. In 2021–2022, his photographs were included in the “Nordic Light” touring exhibition in China, organized by the embassies of Sweden, Norway, and Denmark in China.

== Recognition ==
In 1993, Widstrand co-authored his first book Safari till världens finaste viltområden - Ecotouring: the Ultimate Guide with Magnus Elander. The book was awarded with the Årets Pandabok (WWF Pandabook of the Year) in the year 1994 by the WWF. Widstrand has authored 20 books in 10 languages and has been awarded with the Årets Pandabok -WWF Sweden prize five times.

In 1996, Widstrand was awarded his first Wildlife Photographer of the Year award, staged by the Natural History Museum, London. Since then, he has received Wildlife Photographer of the Year awards 11 times. In 2001, Widstrand was bestowed with the Årets Naturfotograf i Sverige (Swedish Nature Photographer of the Year) title. He has also had five awarded images in the European Nature Photographer of the Year (GDT) awards, since 2003. Outdoor Photographer in 2010 called Widstrand one of the World's 40 Most influential nature photographers.

Widstrand is a Founding Fellow of the International League of Conservation Photographers (ILCP) since 2005, and the first Swede to be elected into it. Apart from that, he has initiated and co-founded several long-term nature conservation communication and media projects, such as the Wild Wonders of Europe, Wild Wonders of China, Rewilding Europe, the Swedish Ecotourism Association, Scandinavian Big Five Predators project and Deforestationsweden.org. He is the managing director and co-owner of Wild Wonders International AB, and co-owner of the nature photography travel agency Wild Nature Photo Adventures.

Widstrand has served as a judge in several international photo competitions including World Press Photo, Wildlife Photographer of the Year, Golden Turtle (Russia), European Nature Photographer of the Year-GDT (Germany), Xishuangbanna Biennal (China) and Humanity Photo Awards (China). He has also had his work exhibited worldwide.

== Bibliography ==
Bibliography
| Year | Title | Publisher | Notes |
|---|---|---|---|
| 1993 | Safari till världens finaste viltområden | Streiffert | co-authored with Magnus Elander |
| 1997 | Ajunngilaq | Wahlström & Widstrand | co-authored with Magnus Elander |
| 1997 | Arktis idag | Boksenteret | co-authored with Magnus Elander |
| 1998 | Ecotouring: the Ultimate Guide | Firefly Books | co-authored with Magnus Elander |
| 1999 | I Arktis | Natur & Kultur | - |
| 2000 | Den lilla boken om vargen | Egmont Richter | co-authored with Magnus Elander and Johan Lewenhaupt |
| 2002 | Rovdjur | Max Ström Bokförlag | co-authored with Magnus Elander and Johan Lewenhaupt |
| 2002 | Den lilla boken om björnen | Damm Förlag | co-authored with Magnus Elander and Johan Lewenhaupt |
| 2004 | Ourson Brun | Pôles d'images | - |
| 2007 | Vilda Sverige : femstjärniga frestelser i fri natur | Norstedts förlag | - |
| 2007 | Wild Sweden: Exploring an Outdoor Wonderland | Norstedts förlag | English language edition |
| 2007 | Wildes Schweden | Bruckmann Verlag | German language edition |
| 2008 | Vindar från Arktis | Norstedts förlag | co-authored with Magnus Elander |
| 2010 | Wild Wonders of Europe | Abrams Books | co-authored with Peter Cairns, Florian Möllers and Bridget Wijnberg |
| 2010 | Merveilleuse Nature | La Martinière Groupe | co-authored with Peter Cairns, Florian Möllers and Bridget Wijnberg |
| 2010 | Wild Wonders of Europe – Exhibition Catalogue | Life Publishing | co-authored with Peter Cairns, Magnus Lundgren, Florian Möllers and Bridget Wijnberg |
| 2011 | Forets d'Europe | La Martinière Groupe | co-authored with Magnus Lundgren, Florian Möllers and Bridget Wijnberg |
| 2012 | Europas Wilde Wasser | National Geographic | co-authored with Magnus Lundgren, Florian Möllers and Bridget Wijnberg |
| 2012 | A la découverte des arbres | La Martinière Groupe | co-authored with Peter Cairns, Florian Möllers and Bridget Wijnberg |
| 2013 | The Aurochs: Born to be Wild | Roodbont | co-authored with Wouter Helmer, Ronald Goderie and Henri Kerkdijk |
| 2017 | Ett vildare liv – En bok om det vildas återkomst | Votum förlag | co-authored with Magnus Lundgren |
| 2020 | Tur: Rashden buit dikim | Blagodijnij fond, Beremitske Biosfera | Russian language edition, co-authored with Wouter Helmer, Ronald Goderie and Henri Kerkdijk |
| 2021 | Papua – Bland paradisfåglar och djävulsrockor | Votum förlag | co-authored with Magnus Lundgren |
| 2022 | El Uro: Nacido para ser Salvaje | Lynx Edicions | |
