= Bruno Saltor =

Spanish footballer and coach

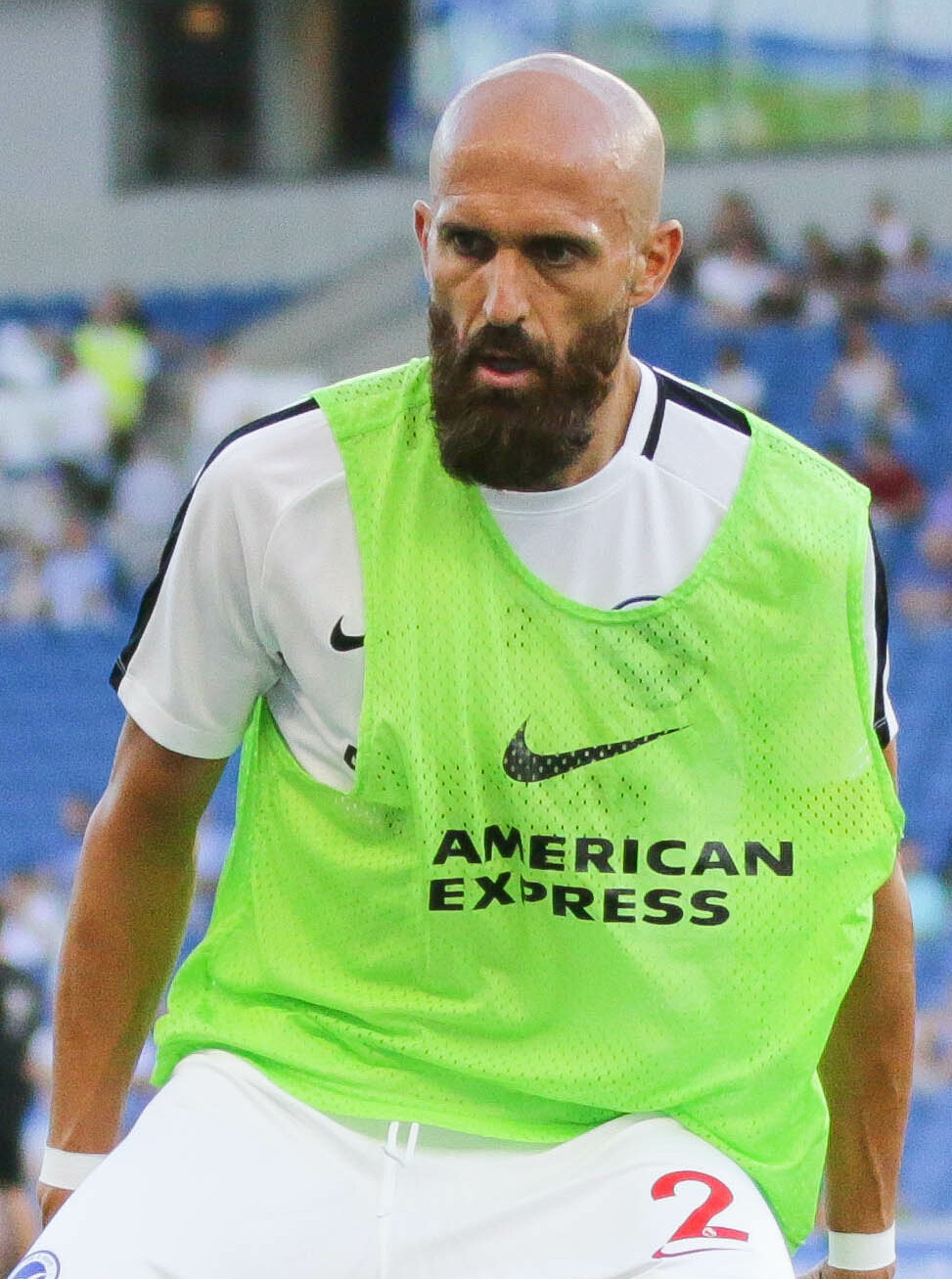
- Bruno Saltor with Brighton & Hove Albion in 2018

Personal information
- Full name: Bruno Saltor Grau
- Date of birth: 1 October 1980 (age 46)
- Place of birth: El Masnou, Spain
- Height: 1.80 m (5 ft 11 in)
- Position: Right-back

Team information
- Current team: Tottenham Hotspur (assistant)

Youth career
- Olimpic Mora d'Ebre
- Lleida
- 1997–1999: Espanyol

Senior career*
Years	Team	Apps	(Gls)
1999–2003	Espanyol B	72	(6)
2001–2003	Espanyol	1	(0)
2001–2002	→ Gimnàstic (loan)	14	(0)
2003–2006	Lleida	110	(1)
2006–2009	Almería	104	(0)
2009–2012	Valencia	59	(0)
2012–2019	Brighton & Hove Albion	225	(6)
Total		585	(13)

Managerial career
- 2023: Chelsea (caretaker)
- * Club domestic league appearances and goals

Bruno Saltor Grau (Spanish pronunciation: [ˈbɾuno salˈtoɾ ɣɾaw]; (Note: In isolation, Grau is pronounced [ɡɾaw].) born 1 October 1980), known as a player as just Bruno, is a Spanish football coach and former player who played as a right-back. He is currently the assistant coach of Premier League club Tottenham Hotspur.

He began his professional career with Espanyol, and went on to appear in 128 La Liga matches, all but one of which were with Almería and Valencia. In 2012, he signed with Brighton & Hove Albion, going on to spend seven years with the English club and also acting as its captain.

He served as caretaker head coach of Chelsea for one match against Liverpool on 4 April 2023. He was replaced by Frank Lampard as interim manager for the rest of the season.

== Playing career ==
=== Spain ===
Born in El Masnou, Barcelona, Catalonia, Bruno Saltor was a product of Espanyol's youth system. He appeared only once for the first team, playing eight minutes in a 3–1 home win over Rayo Vallecano on 29 September 2001; he was used almost exclusively by the B-side during his tenure, spending three of his four years in Segunda División B.

After a further two stints in his native region, with Gimnàstic (loan) and Lleida, Bruno Saltor joined Almería in the summer of 2006, being instrumental in the Andalusia side's first ever promotion to La Liga as a late bloomer. In 2007–08, he missed only four league games as his team overachieved for a final eighth place, and produced similar numbers in the following season.

In mid-June 2009, Bruno Saltor signed a three-year deal with Valencia and reunited with former Almería manager Unai Emery. He had previously arranged a transfer to Real Betis, but the move collapsed as the club was eventually relegated.

=== Brighton & Hove Albion ===
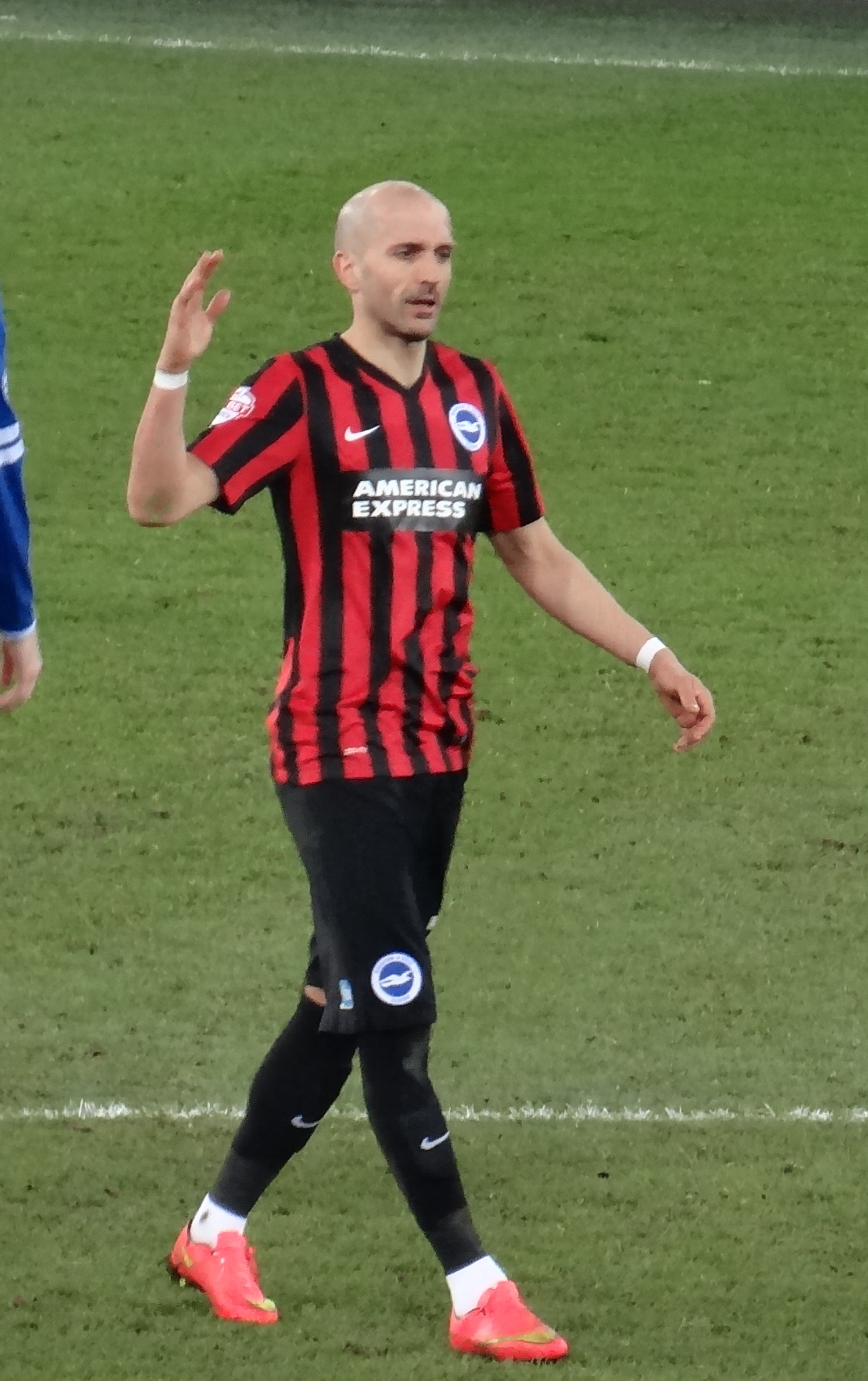
Bruno Saltor playing for Brighton & Hove Albion in 2015

On 25 June 2012, after a further 33 league appearances for Valencia in two seasons combined, free agent Bruno signed a two-year contract for EFL Championship club Brighton & Hove Albion. He scored his first goal for his new team on 24 November, in a 1–1 draw at home to Bolton Wanderers.

At the age of 35/36, Bruno Saltor was still the automatic first choice in his position, helping the club gain promotion to the Premier League at the end of the 2016–17 campaign after 34 years. Previously, in March 2017, the captain agreed to a one-year contract extension, and on 20 April he was included in the Championship Team of the Year for the second year running.

Bruno Saltor made his debut in the English top flight on 12 August 2017, playing the whole of a 2–0 home loss to Manchester City. On 3 April 2018, he signed a new one-year deal. Two weeks later, he made his first league start since January, at home to Tottenham Hotspur in a 1–1 draw that gave his team "a big point" in their fight against relegation, and remained in the side for the 1–0 home win against Manchester United that ensured their safety, to which the player contributed with 25 appearances (26 overall).

A hamstring injury during the opening match of 2018–19 lost Bruno Saltor his place to fellow Spaniard Martín Montoya. Despite his return to the side in early October coinciding with three consecutive winning clean sheets, it proved short-lived. He played in the early rounds of the 2018–19 FA Cup, but not in the quarter-final or semi-final, and started five of the last six league matches as Brighton narrowly avoided relegation.

On 10 May 2019, Bruno Saltor announced his retirement at the end of the season. He started the 4–1 defeat at home to Manchester City that confirmed their second consecutive Premier League title, and ended his post-match speech of appreciation and farewell with the words "Once a Seagull, always a Seagull".

== Coaching career ==
In June 2019, Bruno Saltor was appointed as a senior player development coach at his former club Brighton & Hove Albion.

On 8 September 2022, Bruno Saltor followed Graham Potter on a move to Chelsea. On 2 April 2023, following Potter's departure from the club, Bruno was named as caretaker head coach. Bruno managed the team for one match, a 0–0 draw against Liverpool at Stamford Bridge. Former Chelsea head coach and player Frank Lampard took his place as interim head coach for the rest of the season. He left the club on 25 September 2023.

On 9 January 2025, following Potter's appointment as head coach, Bruno Saltor joined Premier League club West Ham United as assistant head coach.

In February 2026, Bruno Saltor joined Tottenham Hotspur as Assistant Coach.

== Career statistics ==
Appearances and goals by club, season and competition
Club	Season	League			National cup		League cup		Other		Total	
Club	Season	Division	Apps	Goals	Apps	Goals	Apps	Goals	Apps	Goals	Apps	Goals
Espanyol B	2000–01	Segunda División B	32	2	—		—		6 (Note: Appearances in promotion play-offs)	0	38	2
Espanyol B	2001–02	Segunda División B	9	1	—		—		—		9	1
Espanyol B	2002–03	Segunda División B	31	3	—		—		—		31	3
Espanyol B	Total		72	6	—		—		6	0	78	6
Espanyol	2001–02	La Liga	1	0	1	0	—		—		2	0
Gimnàstic (loan)	2001–02	Segunda División	14	0	0	0	—		—		14	0
Lleida	2003–04	Segunda División B	34	1	—		—		5	0	39	1
Lleida	2004–05	Segunda División	37	0	1	0	—		—		38	0
Lleida	2005–06	Segunda División	39	0	4	0	—		—		43	0
Lleida	Total		110	1	5	0	—		5	0	120	1
Almería	2006–07	Segunda División	36	0	0	0	—		—		36	0
Almería	2007–08	La Liga	34	0	2	0	—		—		36	0
Almería	2008–09	La Liga	34	0	3	0	—		—		37	0
Almería	Total		104	0	5	0	—		—		109	0
Valencia	2009–10	La Liga	26	0	3	0	—		8 (Note: Appearances in UEFA Europa League)	1	37	1
Valencia	2010–11	La Liga	19	0	2	0	—		4 (Note: Appearances in UEFA Champions League)	0	25	0
Valencia	2011–12	La Liga	14	0	1	0	—		3	0	18	0
Valencia	Total		59	0	6	0	—		15	1	80	1
Brighton & Hove Albion	2012–13	Championship	30	1	0	0	1	0	0	0	31	1
Brighton & Hove Albion	2013–14	Championship	33	1	0	0	0	0	0	0	33	1
Brighton & Hove Albion	2014–15	Championship	35	3	1	0	1	0	—		37	3
Brighton & Hove Albion	2015–16	Championship	46	1	0	0	0	0	2	0	48	1
Brighton & Hove Albion	2016–17	Championship	42	0	0	0	0	0	—		42	0
Brighton & Hove Albion	2017–18	Premier League	25	0	1	0	0	0	—		26	0
Brighton & Hove Albion	2018–19	Premier League	14	0	4	0	0	0	—		18	0
Brighton & Hove Albion	Total		225	6	6	0	2	0	2	0	235	6
Career total			585	13	23	0	2	0	28	1	638	14

== Honours ==
Lleida

- Segunda División B: 2003–04

Brighton & Hove Albion

- EFL Championship runner-up: 2016–17

Individual

- The Football League Team of the Season: 2015–16
- PFA Team of the Year: 2015–16 Championship, 2016–17 Championship
