= Guilherme Santos (footballer, born 1988) =

Brazilian footballer

Personal information
- Full name: Guilherme Oliveira Santos
- Date of birth: 5 February 1988 (age 38)
- Place of birth: Jequié, Brazil
- Height: 1.73 m (5 ft 8 in)
- Position: Left back

Team information
- Current team: Tombense

Youth career
- 2005: Real Salvador
- 2005: Artsul
- 2005–2007: Vasco da Gama

Senior career*
Years	Team	Apps	(Gls)
2007	Vasco da Gama	24	(0)
2008–2011	Almería	24	(1)
2010	→ Valladolid (loan)	15	(0)
2011–2013	Atlético Mineiro	14	(0)
2012	→ Figueirense (loan)	31	(3)
2013	→ Santos (loan)	10	(0)
2013	→ Atlético Goianiense (loan)	11	(0)
2014	Bahia	32	(2)
2015	Fluminense	1	(0)
2015	Avaí	0	(0)
2015	Criciúma	17	(0)
2016	Sampaio Corrêa	17	(0)
2016–2017	Anorthosis Famagusta	29	(0)
2017	Fortaleza	2	(0)
2017	Paysandu	12	(0)
2018–	Tombense	26	(1)
2018	→ Júbilo Iwata (loan)	12	(0)
2018	→ Paysandu (loan)	15	(0)
2019	→ Paraná (loan)	43	(2)
2020–2021	→ Botafogo (loan)	32	(0)
2021	→ Juventude (loan)	2	(0)
2022	→ Ponte Preta (loan)	5	(0)
- * Club domestic league appearances and goals as of 30 October 2023

Guilherme Oliveira Santos (born 5 February 1988) is a Brazilian footballer who plays for Tombense as a left back.
