= Xavier Pelegrí =

Spanish footballer

Personal information
- Full name: Xavier Pelegrí Durán
- Date of birth: 1 June 1981 (age 45)
- Place of birth: Barcelona, Spain
- Height: 1.85 m (6 ft 1 in)
- Position: Centre back

Youth career
- Barcelona
- Espanyol
- Damm
- Valladolid

Senior career*
Years	Team	Apps	(Gls)
2000–2001	Valladolid B		
2001–2002	Cornellà		
2002–2003	Cacereño	22	(0)
2003–2006	Lleida	70	(1)
2006–2007	Orihuela	29	(0)
2007–2009	Águilas	25	(2)
2009–2010	Sabadell	39	(1)
2010–2011	Sant Andreu	24	(0)
2011–2013	Badalona	60	(7)
2013–2015	Cornellà	46	(4)
- * Club domestic league appearances and goals

Xavier Pelegrí Durán (born 1 June 1981) is a Spanish retired footballer who played as a central defender.

== Club career ==
Born in Barcelona, Catalonia, Pelegrí made his senior debut with Real Valladolid's reserves in Tercera División. He first arrived in Segunda División B in the summer of 2002, joining CP Cacereño after a short stint at UE Cornellà.

In July 2003, Pelegrí moved to UE Lleida also in the third level. He appeared in 27 games in his first season, helping his team promote to Segunda División after a three-year absence.

Pelegrí played his first match as a professional on 5 September 2004, coming on as a late substitute in a 2–0 away win against Cádiz CF. He contributed with 20 appearances in the 2005–06 campaign, which finished in relegation.

Pelegrí subsequently resumed his career in the third and fourth levels, representing Orihuela CF, Águilas CF, CE Sabadell FC, UE Sant Andreu, CF Badalona and Cornellà. He achieved promotion to division three with the latter club in 2014, featuring in 23 matches and scoring twice.
