= Poveda, Ávila =

Poveda
- municipality
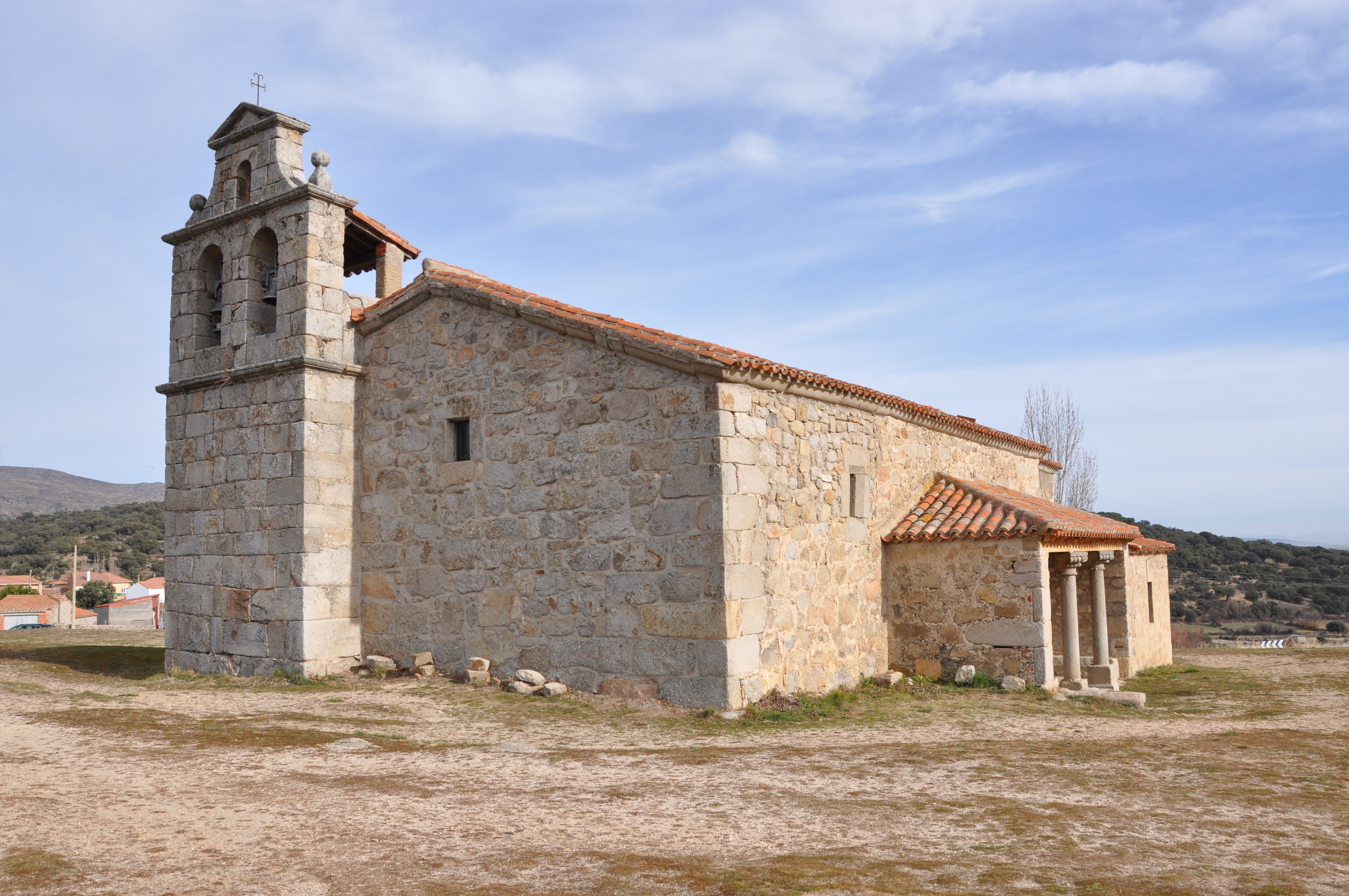
- Church of San Blas
- Flag Coat of arms
- Location in Spain. Poveda (Spain)
- Coordinates: 40°34′01″N 5°04′47″W
- Country: Spain
- Autonomous community: Castile and León
- Province: Ávila
- Municipality: Poveda

Area
  - Total: 6 km^{2} (2.3 sq mi)

Population (2025-01-01)
  - Total: 30
  - Density: 5.0/km^{2} (13/sq mi)
- Time zone: UTC+1 (CET)
  - Summer (DST): UTC+2 (CEST)
- Website: Official website

Poveda is a municipality located in the province of Ávila, Castile and León, Spain.

== Population ==
Historical population
| Year | Pop. | ±% p.a. |
|---|---|---|
| 2023 | 34 | — |
| 2024 | 33 | −2.94% |
| 2025 | 30 | −9.09% |
Source: INE
