= Daniel Marín =

Spanish footballer

Dani Marín
Personal information
- Full name: Daniel Marín Vázquez
- Date of birth: 1 August 1974 (age 52)
- Place of birth: Barcelona, Spain
- Height: 1.81 m (5 ft 11 in)
- Position: Left back

Youth career
- Damm

Senior career*
Years	Team	Apps	(Gls)
1993–1995	Mallorca B	38	(7)
1994–1996	Mallorca	4	(0)
1995–1996	→ Atlético Madrid B (loan)	30	(3)
1996–1998	Elche	13	(1)
1998–1999	Gramenet	27	(3)
1999–2001	Getafe	52	(1)
2001–2002	Gimnàstic	33	(2)
2002–2006	Lleida	115	(1)
2006–2008	Terrassa	44	(2)
2008–2011	Lleida	93	(3)
Total		449	(23)
- * Club domestic league appearances and goals

Daniel 'Dani' Marín Vázquez (born 1 August 1974) is a Spanish retired footballer who played as a left back.

== Club career ==
Marín was born in Barcelona, Catalonia. Having started with RCD Mallorca's reserves in 1993, he spent most of his 18-year professional career with local club UE Lleida (seven seasons), amassing Segunda División totals of 162 games and five goals in representation of five teams.

At the end of the 2010–11 campaign, Lleida folded and the 37-year-old Marín retired from football.

== Honours ==
Mallorca B

- Tercera División: 1994–95

Lleida

- Segunda División B: 2003–04
