= Igor Jauregi =

Spanish footballer

Personal information
- Full name: Igor Jauregi Iraola
- Date of birth: 29 April 1974 (age 52)
- Place of birth: Tolosa, Spain
- Height: 1.81 m (5 ft 11 1/2 in)
- Position: Centre-back

Senior career*
Years	Team	Apps	(Gls)
1994–1995	Tolosa		
1995–1996	Hernani		
1997	Aurrerá	18	(0)
1997–1998	Eibar	38	(3)
1998–2007	Real Sociedad	135	(7)
2002	→ Eibar (loan)	12	(0)
- * Club domestic league appearances and goals

Igor Jauregi Iraola (born 29 April 1974) is a Spanish former professional footballer who played mainly as a central defender.

== Club career ==
Born in Tolosa, Gipuzkoa, Jauregi spent the first part of his career in the lower leagues, arriving at Basque giants Real Sociedad at already 24. He played 22 La Liga matches in his first season, his debut coming on 30 August 1998 in a 3–3 home draw against Real Oviedo.

After a six-month loan in the Segunda División with SD Eibar, which he had already represented, Jauregui returned to Real but, safe for the 2002–03 campaign, where the club incidentally finished second, he was more often than not a fringe player.

In June 2007, after his contract expired, Jauregi had to retire from the game due to persistent health problems: after a poorly managed tendinitis three years earlier, he also contracted the Helicobacter pylori bacteria, even though he successfully dealt with the latter situation.

Jauregi returned to Eibar in 2014, going on to spend several years at the Ipurua Municipal Stadium as team psychologist.
