= Juanito (footballer, born 1980) =

Spanish footballer

Personal information
- Full name: Juan Jesús Gutiérrez Robles
- Date of birth: 17 February 1980 (age 46)
- Place of birth: Málaga, Spain
- Height: 1.86 m (6 ft 1 in)
- Position: Defensive midfielder

Youth career
- Málaga

Senior career*
Years	Team	Apps	(Gls)
1998–2003	Málaga B	52	(6)
2002–2005	Málaga	47	(2)
2005–2006	Alavés	37	(0)
2006–2007	Real Sociedad	28	(1)
2007–2009	Almería	61	(1)
2009–2011	Málaga	36	(0)
2011	Almería	9	(0)
2011–2013	Asteras Tripolis	21	(0)
Total		291	(10)

Managerial career
- 2016–2017: Almería (assistant)
- * Club domestic league appearances and goals

Juan Jesús Gutiérrez Robles (born 17 February 1980), known as Juanito, is a Spanish former professional footballer who played mainly as a defensive midfielder.

Over the course of nine seasons, he amassed La Liga totals of 218 games and four goals, mainly with Málaga (five years) and Almería (three). He also played abroad in Greece late into his career.

== Club career ==
Juanito was born in Málaga, Andalusia. Earlier a central defender, he grew through the ranks of hometown's Málaga CF, making his La Liga debut on 1 September 2002 in a 3–2 away win against neighbours Recreativo de Huelva. He then spent one season each with Deportivo Alavés and Real Sociedad, with both teams eventually being relegated to the Segunda División.

Juanito joined UD Almería in 2007–08, where he was successfully reconverted into a defensive midfielder, being an important first-team member over two top-flight campaigns. In August 2009 he returned to Málaga, replacing Lolo, a player who occupied his same positions and had returned from his loan to neighbouring Sevilla FC.

Juanito's first game in his second spell was on 2009–10's opener, starting in a 3–0 home victory over Atlético Madrid. He finished the season with 30 matches – 25 starts – as the side narrowly avoided relegation after a 17th-place.

In December 2010, shortly after the arrival of manager Manuel Pellegrini, Juanito was deemed surplus to requirements alongside five other players. On 4 January 2011 he was released by Málaga with Albert Luque and, 11 days later, he returned to former club Almería, signing a five-month contract.

Juanito made his competitive debut on 19 January 2011, in a 3–2 win at Deportivo de La Coruña (4–2 on aggregate) which meant the side reached the semi-finals of the Copa del Rey for the first time ever. In July, after they were relegated from the top tier, he was released, going on to spend two years in the Super League Greece with Asteras Tripolis F.C. and retire afterwards, aged 33.

On 14 June 2016, Juanito returned to Almería as Fernando Soriano's assistant manager.

== Honours ==
Málaga

- UEFA Intertoto Cup: 2002
