= Zuhaitz Gurrutxaga =

Spanish footballer and musician

Personal information
- Full name: Zuhaitz Gurrutxaga Loiola
- Date of birth: 23 November 1980 (age 45)
- Place of birth: Elgoibar, Spain
- Height: 1.80 m (5 ft 11 in)
- Position: Defender

Youth career
- Real Sociedad

Senior career*
Years	Team	Apps	(Gls)
1998–2002	Real Sociedad B	18	(0)
1999–2004	Real Sociedad	34	(0)
2003	→ Algeciras (loan)	3	(0)
2004–2005	Rayo Vallecano	9	(0)
2005–2006	Real Unión	13	(0)
2006–2007	Lemona	28	(0)
2007–2008	Zamora	35	(1)
2008–2010	Real Unión	51	(3)
2010–2012	Lemona	57	(0)
2012–2013	Beasain	23	(0)
Total		271	(4)

International career
1996–1997	Spain U16	10	(0)
1997	Spain U17	5	(0)
2000	Spain U21	1	(0)
Medal record
Men's football
Representing Spain
UEFA European Under-16 Championship
Winner	1997 Germany
- * Club domestic league appearances and goals

Zuhaitz Gurrutxaga Loiola (born 23 November 1980) is a Spanish former footballer who played as a defender.

== Club career ==
Born in Elgoibar, Gipuzkoa, Gurrutxaga played four La Liga seasons with Real Sociedad, but was almost always a fringe player during his spell, his best output being 16 games in his first year. He made his debut in the competition on 23 January 2000 in a 1–1 away draw against Atlético Madrid, being sent off in the process.

After leaving Sociedad in the summer of 2004, following a short loan spell in the second division with Algeciras CF, Gurrutxaga resumed his career in the lower leagues, the sole exception being the 2009–10 campaign with Real Unión (24 matches, team relegation from the second tier).

== Musical career & book published ==
Gurrutxaga was the front man and lead singer of Van Popel, an unattached band who toured mostly within the Basque Country.

In November 2023, he published the biographical Subcampeón with the publishing house Libros del KO, a book co-written with writer and journalist Ander Izagirre, in which he looks back on his career, filled with anecdotes, and also recounts the mental health problems caused by not having had the tools to cope with the pressure to which a professional athlete is exposed.

== Honours ==
Spain U16

- UEFA European Under-16 Championship: 1997
