= La Póveda de Soria =

Coordinates: 42.017°N 2.500°W

- Municipality
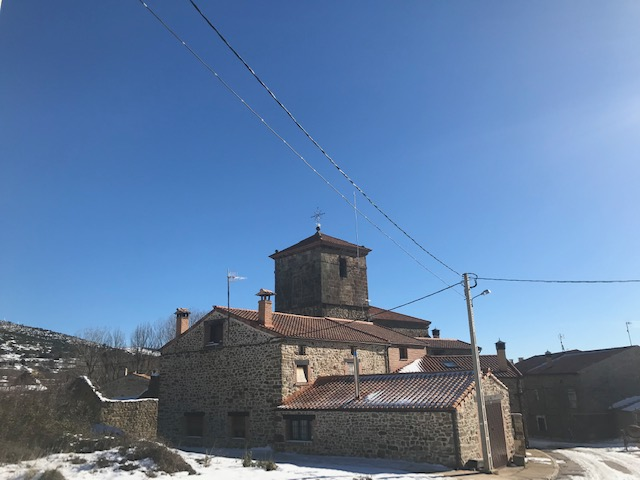
- Parish chuck of La Póveda
- Interactive map of La Póveda de Soria
- Country: Spain
- Autonomous community: Castile and León
- Province: Soria
- Municipality: La Póveda de Soria

Area
  - Total: 63 km^{2} (24 sq mi)
- Elevation: 1,294 m (4,245 ft)

Population (2025-01-01)
  - Total: 108
  - Density: 1.7/km^{2} (4.4/sq mi)
- Time zone: UTC+1 (CET)
  - Summer (DST): UTC+2 (CEST)
- Website: Official website

La Póveda de Soria is a municipality located in the province of Soria, Castile and León, Spain. According to the latest 2019 data from the Spanish National Institute of Statistics (INE), the municipality has a population of 123 inhabitants.
