= Sander Westerveld =

Dutch football coach and former professional player (born 1974)

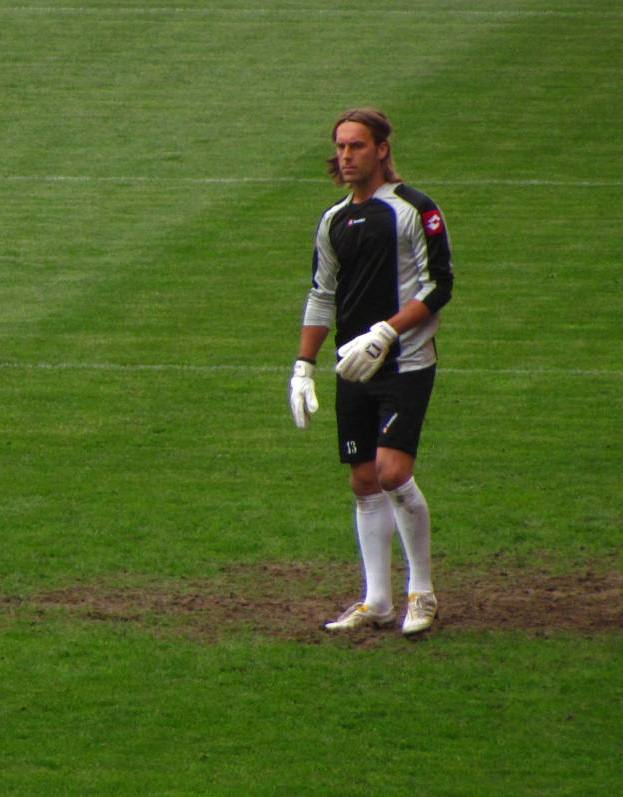
- Westerveld in 2011

Personal information
- Full name: Sander Westerveld
- Date of birth: 23 October 1974 (age 52)
- Place of birth: Enschede, Netherlands
- Height: 1.90 m (6 ft 3 in)
- Position: Goalkeeper

Youth career
- 1980–1988: De Tubanters
- 1988–1994: Twente

Senior career*
Years	Team	Apps	(Gls)
1994–1995	Twente	14	(0)
1996–1999	Vitesse	101	(0)
1999–2001	Liverpool	75	(0)
2001–2005	Real Sociedad	77	(0)
2004–2005	→ Mallorca (loan)	6	(0)
2005–2006	Portsmouth	6	(0)
2006	→ Everton (loan)	2	(0)
2006–2007	Almería	34	(0)
2007–2008	Sparta Rotterdam	29	(0)
2009–2011	Monza	54	(0)
2011–2013	Ajax Cape Town	42	(0)
Total		440	(0)

International career
1999–2001	Netherlands	6	(0)

Managerial career
- 2013–2014: Ajax Cape Town (goalkeeping coach)
- * Club domestic league appearances and goals

Sander Westerveld (born 23 October 1974) is a Dutch football coach and former professional player who played as a goalkeeper. He was the goalkeeping coach of South African Premier Soccer League club Ajax Cape Town.

The highlight of his playing career, spent in five countries, was a treble of the FA Cup, League Cup and UEFA Cup with Liverpool in 2001. Westerveld was included in the Netherlands' squads for Euro 2000 and Euro 2004, but, due to the consistency of Edwin van der Sar, earned six international caps over five years.

== Club career ==
=== Early career and Liverpool ===
Westerveld's first professional match was for Twente in 1994. After two seasons there, he moved to Vitesse for free.

Following the 1998–99 season, during which he helped Vitesse to qualify for Europe, Westerveld was sold to Liverpool, where he succeeded David James. He became the most expensive goalkeeper in British football when he joined the Reds for a reported fee of £4 million during the summer of 1999. Westerveld made his Liverpool debut against Sheffield Wednesday on 7 August 1999 in a 2–1 away win. Then, on 28 August 1999, he saved a Davor Šuker penalty, as Liverpool beat Arsenal 2–0. He was Gérard Houllier's first choice to succeed James as Anfield's number one, and Westerveld fully justified the manager's confidence by playing a leading role in Liverpool's return to Europe, conceding the fewest goals in the 1999–2000 Premier League season.

He played a key role in the treble season of 2000–01 for Liverpool, emerging as the hero of the League Cup final victory over Birmingham City, making the winning save from Andrew Johnson in the penalty shoot-out.

However, towards the end of his two-season spell at Liverpool, he was often subjected to criticism from the media. After a major mistake in a match against Bolton Wanderers on 27 August 2001, he was put on the bench by Houllier, who promptly signed two new goalkeepers, Jerzy Dudek and Chris Kirkland. He did not play again after the Bolton error, and was sold to Real Sociedad of La Liga on 16 December 2001, for £3.4 million.

=== Real Sociedad ===
Sociedad were runners-up in La Liga in the 2002–03 season, and played in the following season's Champions League. However, that season saw him loaned to Mallorca, where Miguel Ángel Moyá kept him out of the team. His contract then expired.

=== Portsmouth ===
In July 2005, he moved back to the Premier League with Portsmouth, being signed by Alain Perrin on a one-year contract. He was expected to be the first choice goalkeeper, ahead of Jamie Ashdown and Kostas Chalkias. However, after an inconsistent time at Fratton Park, in which he played only six league matches, he was allowed to move on a 28-day loan to Everton, rivals of his former club Liverpool, on 24 February 2006. Everton had a temporary goalkeeping crisis in which Nigel Martyn, Richard Wright and Iain Turner were all unavailable, and Westerveld played two matches for them. When he returned to Portsmouth, he remained a substitute and was released by Harry Redknapp on 11 May 2006.

=== Later career ===
On 28 July 2006, Westerveld signed with Segunda División club Almería for one season, in which he helped them to achieve promotion to La Liga before leaving the club at the end of his contract.

On 7 September 2007, he joined Sparta Rotterdam on a short-term contract and in May 2008 he announced that he was to leave Sparta.

During the summer of 2009, he signed for Italian Lega Pro Prima Divisione club Monza, after a successful trial with the club. He later joined Ajax Cape Town in South Africa where he was the number 1 goalkeeper. At the end of the 2012–13 season, his contract was terminated, and he then became a goalkeeping coach at the club.

== International career ==
Westerveld made his debut for the Netherlands on 8 June 1999, in an away friendly 3–1 defeat to Brazil in Goiânia. He was included in the Dutch squad for Euro 2000, and played the last group match against France, both teams being already qualified. The last of his six caps came on 28 February 2001, in a 0–0 friendly home draw with Turkey, although he did make the squad for Euro 2004.

== Personal life ==
Son Sem Westerveld who is playing for Zaragoza, is also a professional football goalkeeper.

== Career statistics ==
Appearances and goals by club, season and competition
Club	Season	League			National Cup		League Cup		Continental		Other		Total	
Club	Season	Division	Apps	Goals	Apps	Goals	Apps	Goals	Apps	Goals	Apps	Goals	Apps	Goals
Twente	1994–95	Eredivisie	3	0	0	0	—		0	0	—		3	0
Twente	1995–96	Eredivisie	11	0	0	0	—		—		—		11	0
Twente	Total		14	0	0	0	—		0	0	—		14	0
Vitesse	1996–97	Eredivisie	34	0	1	0	—		—		—		35	0
Vitesse	1997–98	Eredivisie	34	0	0	0	—		2 (Note: Appearance(s) in UEFA Cup)	0	—		36	0
Vitesse	1998–99	Eredivisie	33	0	3	0	—		2	0	—		38	0
Vitesse	Total		101	0	4	0	—		4	0	—		109	0
Liverpool	1999–2000	Premier League	36	0	2	0	1	0	—		—		39	0
Liverpool	2000–01	Premier League	38	0	6	0	4	0	13	0	—		61	0
Liverpool	2001–02	Premier League	1	0	0	0	0	0	0	0	2 (Note: One appearance in FA Charity Shield, one appearance in UEFA Super Cup)	0	3	0
Liverpool	Total		75	0	8	0	5	0	13	0	2	0	103	0
Real Sociedad	2001–02	La Liga	20	0	0	0	—		—		—		20	0
Real Sociedad	2002–03	La Liga	37	0	1	0	—		—		—		38	0
Real Sociedad	2003–04	La Liga	20	0	0	0	—		6 (Note: Appearance(s) in UEFA Champions League)	0	—		26	0
Real Sociedad	Total		77	0	1	0	—		6	0	—		84	0
Mallorca (loan)	2004–05	La Liga	6	0	2	0	—		—		—		8	0
Portsmouth	2005–06	Premier League	6	0	1	0	0	0	—		—		7	0
Everton (loan)	2005–06	Premier League	2	0	—		—		—		—		2	0
Almería	2006–07	Segunda División	34	0	0	0	—		—		—		34	0
Sparta Rotterdam	2007–08	Eredivisie	29	0	1	0	—		—		—		30	0
Monza	2009–10	Lega Pro	30	0	2	0	—		—		—		32	0
Monza	2010–11	Lega Pro	24	0	0	0	—		—		2 (Note: Appearance(s) in the relegation play-offs)	0	26	0
Monza	Total		54	0	2	0	—		—		2	0	58	0
Ajax Cape Town	2011–12	ABSA Premiership	23	0	0	0	2	0	—		—		25	0
Ajax Cape Town	2012–13	ABSA Premiership	19	0	0	0	1	0	—		—		20	0
Ajax Cape Town	Total		42	0	0	0	3	0	—		—		45	0
Career total			440	0	19	0	8	0	23	0	4	0	494	0

== Honours ==
Liverpool

- FA Cup: 2000–01
- Football League Cup: 2000–01
- FA Charity Shield: 2001
- UEFA Cup: 2000–01
- UEFA Super Cup: 2001
