= José Luis Cabrera (footballer) =

Spanish footballer (born 1982)

Personal information
- Full name: José Luis Cabrera Cava
- Date of birth: 10 May 1982 (age 44)
- Place of birth: Madrid, Spain
- Height: 1.93 m (6 ft 4 in)
- Position: Midfielder

Youth career
- Real Madrid

Senior career*
Years	Team	Apps	(Gls)
2001–2002	Real Madrid C		
2002–2003	Real Madrid B	11	(0)
2003–2006	Pontevedra	92	(3)
2006–2007	Almería	33	(0)
2008–2009	Alavés	9	(0)
2009–2011	Córdoba	12	(0)
2012	Villanovense	11	(0)
2012–2013	Santa Ana	19	(0)
Total		187	(3)
- * Club domestic league appearances and goals

José Luis Cabrera Cava (born 10 May 1982) is a Spanish retired footballer who played as a defensive midfielder.

== Club career ==
Cabrera was born in Madrid. An unsuccessful Real Madrid youth graduate, he made his professional debut with Pontevedra CF, playing with the Galicians one season in the second division and two in the third.

In 2006–07, Cabrera was an important defensive weapon as UD Almería achieved a first–ever La Liga promotion. However, he was deemed surplus to requirements by coach Unai Emery, moving in January 2008 to Deportivo Alavés – now in the second level – where he suffered a terrible knee injury in his first game which made him lose the remainder of the campaign.

Following Alavés' 2009 relegation, Cabrera signed with Córdoba CF in the summer, also in division two. In early January 2010, during the first half of the 0–0 home draw against FC Cartagena, he suffered the same injury, being lost for the rest of 2009–10.

Cabrera returned to the third tier in January 2012, with the 29-year-old signing with CF Villanovense.
