= Domingo Cisma =

Spanish footballer (born 1982)

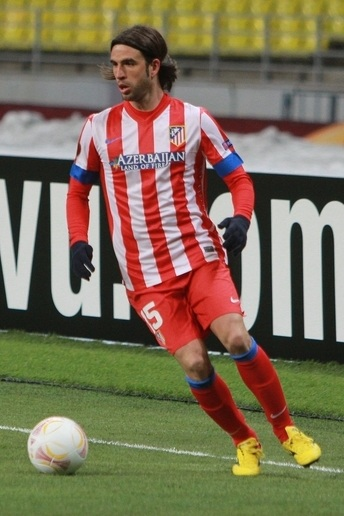
- Cisma with Atlético Madrid in 2013

Personal information
- Full name: Domingo Cisma González
- Date of birth: 9 February 1982 (age 44)
- Place of birth: Seville, Spain
- Height: 1.84 m (6 ft 0 in)
- Position: Left-back

Youth career
- Betis

Senior career*
Years	Team	Apps	(Gls)
2002–2003	Ayamonte		
2003–2005	Atlético Madrid B	46	(1)
2005–2010	Almería	80	(4)
2008–2009	→ Numancia (loan)	34	(2)
2010–2012	Racing Santander	58	(0)
2012–2013	Atlético Madrid	2	(0)
2013–2015	Elche	44	(0)
2015–2017	Córdoba	54	(1)
Total		318	(8)

Managerial career
- 2018–2021: Morón
- 2021–2023: Cartagena (assistant)
- 2023–2024: Oviedo (assistant)
- 2024: Las Palmas (assistant)
- * Club domestic league appearances and goals

Domingo Cisma González (born 9 February 1982) is a Spanish former professional footballer who played as a left-back.

He appeared in 182 La Liga matches over eight seasons, totalling five goals for Almería, Numancia, Racing de Santander, Atlético Madrid and Elche.

== Playing career ==
Born in Seville, Andalusia, Cisma played for Ayamonte and Atlético Madrid B during his early career. For 2005–06, he signed with Almería of the Segunda División, contributing 20 games the following season (scoring in a 2–1 win at Elche) as the Andalusia club promoted to La Liga for the first time ever.

Moving to recently promoted Numancia in July 2008, on loan, Cisma netted his first top-flight goal on 26 October, in the 96th minute, for a 2–1 home victory over Racing de Santander. He was first choice throughout the relegation-ending campaign.

Cisma then returned to Almería, where he finally became a starter, even appearing as a central defender on occasion due to the many injuries that ravaged the back sector; the team managed to retain their league status. In late May 2010, however, his link expired and a new deal was not arranged, with the player eventually leaving for Racing Santander on a four-year contract.

On 28 August 2012, after having already started the second-division season with the Cantabrians, Cisma agreed on a return to Atlético Madrid, signing as a free agent for one year. He subsequently represented Elche and Córdoba – the first side in the top flight and the latter in division two– before retiring in 2017 due to injuries.

== Coaching career ==
On 16 February 2018, Cisma was appointed manager of Morón in the Andalusia regional leagues. In January 2021, he joined Luis Carrión's coaching staff at second-tier Cartagena; the pair then worked together at Real Oviedo and Las Palmas.

== Honours ==
Atlético Madrid

- Copa del Rey: 2012–13
