= Sergio Boris (footballer) =

Spanish footballer

Personal information
- Full name: Sergio Boris González Monteagudo
- Date of birth: 26 May 1980 (age 46)
- Place of birth: Avilés, Spain
- Height: 1.82 m (6 ft 0 in)
- Position: Defender

Youth career
- Avilés
- 1996–1998: Oviedo

Senior career*
Years	Team	Apps	(Gls)
1998–1999	Oviedo B	33	(0)
1999–2002	Oviedo	97	(1)
2002–2006	Real Sociedad	35	(0)
2004–2005	→ Córdoba (loan)	11	(0)
2006–2011	Numancia	100	(0)
2011–2013	Avilés	56	(3)
2013–2017	Marino	56	(2)
2017–2018	Colunga	27	(1)
Total		415	(7)

International career
2000–2001	Spain U21	7	(0)
2000–2001	Asturias	2	(0)
- * Club domestic league appearances and goals

Sergio Boris González Monteagudo (born 26 May 1980), commonly known as Boris, is a Spanish former professional footballer who played mainly as a central defender.

He amassed La Liga totals of 129 matches and one goal over seven seasons, with Oviedo, Real Sociedad and Numancia. He added 114 appearances in the Segunda División, in a 20-year senior career.

== Club career ==
Born in Avilés, Asturias, Boris was a youth product of local Real Oviedo's youth ranks. He appeared once for the main squad during the 1998–99 season, a 3–0 La Liga away loss against Valencia CF on 29 May 1999, and subsequently became first choice, as the team suffered top-flight relegation in 2001.

Boris then joined Real Sociedad, being an historic signing as he was the first Spanish native player from outside the Basque Country to be signed by the club for 35 years. After appearing in 25 games in their runner-up campaign in the league, he played almost no part the following years, also serving an unassuming loan stint with Córdoba CF (Segunda División) in 2004–05, where he was inclusively made to train separately for more than two months.

Released, Boris signed with CD Numancia of the same level, being a key defensive element as the side from Soria returned to the top tier in 2008 after a three-year hiatus. In June 2011, having totalled just 18 league appearances in his last two seasons – three matches in the latter – the 31-year-old left the Nuevo Estadio Los Pajaritos and returned to his hometown with his first football club Real Avilés Industrial CF, in the Tercera División.
