= Rubén García (footballer, born 1980) =

Spanish footballer

Personal information
- Full name: Rubén García Arnal
- Date of birth: 14 July 1980 (age 46)
- Place of birth: Zaragoza, Spain
- Height: 1.84 m (6 ft 0 in)
- Position: Midfielder

Youth career
- Zaragoza

Senior career*
Years	Team	Apps	(Gls)
1999–2001	Zaragoza B		
2001–2002	Fraga		
2002–2007	Lleida	150	(9)
2007–2008	Racing Ferrol	26	(1)
2008–2009	Lorca Deportiva	27	(1)
2009–2010	Racing Ferrol	15	(0)
2010	Lleida	8	(0)
2010–2012	Hospitalet	56	(3)
Total		282	(14)
- * Club domestic league appearances and goals

Rubén García Arnal (born 14 July 1980 in Zaragoza, Aragon) is a Spanish retired footballer who played as a defensive midfielder.

== Honours ==
Lleida

- Segunda División B: 2003–04
