= Rubén Pulido (footballer, born 1979) =

Spanish footballer

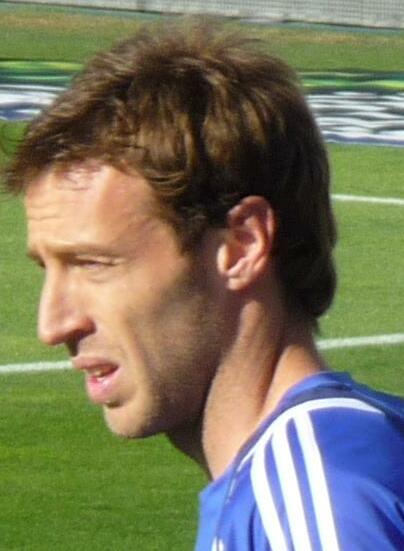
- Pulido in 2009

Personal information
- Full name: Rubén Martín Pulido
- Date of birth: 2 February 1979 (age 47)
- Place of birth: Madrid, Spain
- Height: 1.87 m (6 ft 1 1/2 in)
- Position: Centre-back

Team information
- Current team: Talavera (manager)

Youth career
- Real Madrid

Senior career*
Years	Team	Apps	(Gls)
1998–2000	Real Madrid C		
2000–2001	Conquense	29	(5)
2001–2003	Getafe	32	(0)
2003	→ Sporting Gijón (loan)	22	(4)
2003–2004	Rayo Vallecano	34	(4)
2004–2007	Getafe	49	(3)
2007–2008	Almería	26	(3)
2008–2010	Zaragoza	45	(2)
2010–2012	Asteras Tripolis	39	(4)
2012–2014	Aris	35	(0)
Total		311	(25)

Managerial career
- 2015–2018: Talavera (assistant)
- 2022–2024: Cazalegas
- 2025: Conquense
- 2026–: Talavera
- * Club domestic league appearances and goals

Rubén Martín Pulido (born 2 February 1979) is a Spanish former professional footballer who played as a central defender, currently the manager and sporting director of CF Talavera de la Reina.

He amassed La Liga totals of 97 matches and eight goals over five seasons, representing in the competition Getafe, Almería and Zaragoza. He finished his 16-year senior career in Greece.

== Club career ==
Pulido was born in Madrid. After appearing for modest sides UB Conquense and Getafe CF, the latter then in the Segunda División B, the Real Madrid youth graduate spent one Segunda División season each with Rayo Vallecano and Sporting de Gijón.

Pulido returned to Getafe on a permanent basis in the summer of 2004, helping the capital team to retain their recently achieved top-division status. However, he was never an undisputed starter during his three-year spell, with a best output of 25 La Liga games in the 2005–06 season.

In July 2008, Pulido signed for top-flight newcomers UD Almería, and was one of the Andalusians' most important players in his first year by scoring three league goals, including the only in a 20 January 2008 home win over Deportivo de La Coruña and another in a 2–2 home draw with FC Barcelona on 16 March.

After just one season with Almería – he had signed a two-year deal – Pulido joined Real Zaragoza, recently relegated to the second tier. He contributed 23 appearances as the Aragonese were immediately promoted.

Pulido played roughly the same number of matches in the 2009–10 campaign, scoring against his former employers Almería (2–1 home win) and Villarreal CF (3–3 home draw), and being occasionally deployed as right-back. In the following off-season, the 31-year-old did not have his contract renewed and moved to Asteras Tripolis F.C. of the Super League Greece.

On 30 July 2012, Pulido signed with Aris Thessaloniki F.C. of the same country and league.
