= Alberto Hernández (footballer) =

Spanish footballer (born 1977)

Alberto
Personal information
- Full name: Andrés Alberto Hernández Socas
- Date of birth: 8 March 1977 (age 49)
- Place of birth: Las Palmas, Spain
- Height: 1.90 m (6 ft 3 in)
- Position: Defensive midfielder

Senior career*
Years	Team	Apps	(Gls)
1997–1999	Las Palmas B		
1999–2006	Las Palmas	110	(2)
1999–2001	→ Universidad LP (loan)	66	(3)
2006–2007	Almería	27	(1)
2007–2009	Ceuta	70	(5)
2009–2011	Universidad LP	68	(5)
Total		341+	(16+)
- * Club domestic league appearances and goals

Andrés Alberto Hernández Socas (born 8 March 1977 in Las Palmas, Canary Islands), known as Alberto, is a Spanish former professional footballer who played as a defensive midfielder.
