= Juan Povedano =

Spanish footballer

Personal information
- Full name: Juan Povedano Martínez
- Date of birth: 24 May 1979 (age 47)
- Place of birth: Madrid, Spain
- Height: 1.80 m (5 ft 11 in)
- Position: Centre back

Senior career*
Years	Team	Apps	(Gls)
2000–2001	Rayo Majadahonda		
2001–2004	Atlético Madrid B	32	(1)
2004–2005	Ponferradina	26	(0)
2005–2008	Lleida	60	(3)
2008–2009	Ponferradina	23	(1)
2009–2010	Melilla	27	(2)
2010–2011	Leganés	5	(0)
2011–2012	Melilla	18	(0)
2013	Selfoss	8	(1)
2014	S.S. Reyes	11	(0)
Total		210	(8)
- * Club domestic league appearances and goals

Juan Povedano Martínez (born 24 May 1979 in Madrid) is a Spanish retired footballer who played as a central defender.

== Honours ==
Rayo Majadahonda

- Tercera División: 2000–01

Atlético Madrid B

- Segunda División B: 2003–04

Ponferradina

- Segunda División B: 2004–05
