= Poveda de la Sierra =

Poveda de la Sierra, Spain
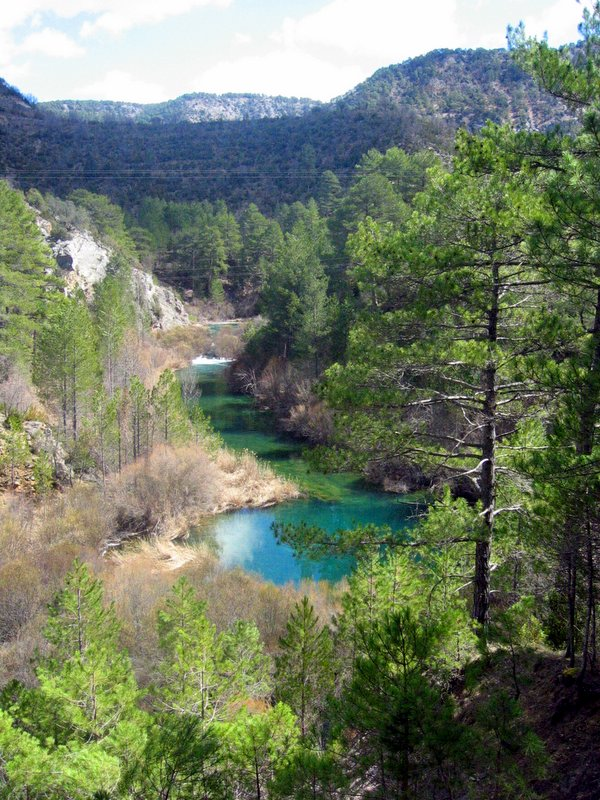

- Coat of arms

- Location within Province of Guadalajara Location within Castilla-La Mancha Location within Spain
- Country: Spain
- Autonomous community: Castile-La Mancha
- Province: Guadalajara
- Municipality: Poveda de la Sierra

Area
  - Total: 51.7 km^{2} (20.0 sq mi)

Population (2025-01-01)
  - Total: 99
  - Density: 1.9/km^{2} (5.0/sq mi)
- Time zone: UTC+1 (CET)
  - Summer (DST): UTC+2 (CEST)

Poveda de la Sierra is a municipality located in the province of Guadalajara, Castile-La Mancha, Spain. According to the 2004 census (INE), the municipality had a population of 179 inhabitants.
