= Poveda (surname) =

Poveda is a surname. Notable people with the surname include:

- Alfredo Poveda (1926-1990), interim President of Ecuador
- Arcadio Poveda (1930–2022), Mexican astronomer
- Christian Poveda (1955-2009), French photojournalist and film director
- Darío Poveda (born 1997), Spanish footballer
- Eva Poveda (born 1965), Spanish scientist
- Miguel Poveda (born 1973), Spanish flamenco singer
- Pedro Poveda Castroverde (1874-1936), Spanish priest and martyr
