= Aitor López Rekarte =

Spanish footballer

Personal information
- Full name: Aitor López Rekarte
- Date of birth: 18 August 1975 (age 51)
- Place of birth: Mondragón, Spain
- Height: 1.73 m (5 ft 8 in)
- Position: Right-back

Youth career
- 1989–1994: Real Sociedad

Senior career*
Years	Team	Apps	(Gls)
1994–1997	Real Sociedad B	98	(2)
1997–2007	Real Sociedad	316	(4)
2007–2008	Almería	10	(0)
2009	Eibar	11	(0)
Total		435	(6)

International career
1991	Spain U16	7	(0)
1993	Spain U17	3	(0)
1994	Spain U18	6	(0)
1997–1998	Spain U21	6	(0)
1997	Spain U23	3	(0)
2004	Spain	1	(0)
2000–2007	Basque Country	9	(0)
- * Club domestic league appearances and goals

Aitor López Rekarte (born 18 August 1975) is a Spanish former professional footballer. He played as a defender on the right side, and sporadically on the other flank.

His 15-year career was closely connected to Real Sociedad, where he spent 13 of 15 total seasons, appearing in 338 competitive games.

== Club career ==
Born in Mondragón, Basque Country, López Rekarte played a decade with local club Real Sociedad, making nearly 350 competitive appearances with the first team. After being promoted to the main squad for 1997–98, he immediately became the starter, his worst output consisting of 26 games in his second professional season.

López Rekarte featured mostly at left-back in that campaign as Real finished third, as habitual starter Agustín Aranzábal suffered a long injury lay-off. Eventually, he also became team captain, only missing one La Liga match in 2002–03 for the runners-up.

In July 2007, López Rekarte switched to newly promoted Almería, but appeared scarcely throughout the season as the Andalusians overachieved, being subsequently released. On 18 March 2009, he joined Segunda División side Eibar in a deal until the end of the campaign. After the latter's relegation, he chose to retire from football aged 33.

== International career ==
López Rekarte earned one cap for Spain, in a friendly against Scotland on 3 September 2004 (1–1, in Valencia). Previously, he helped the nation's under-21s to win the 1998 UEFA European Championship.

== Personal life ==
López Rekarte was the younger brother of another professional footballer, Luis, who also played for Real Sociedad, also being a right-back and an international. His niece, Maitane López, was also involved in the sport.

== Honours ==
Spain U21

- UEFA European Under-21 Championship: 1998
