= 2006–07 Athletic Bilbao season =

Athletic Bilbao
2006–07 season
- President: Ana Urkijo
- Head coach: Félix Sarriugarte (until 27 November); Mané (from 28 November)
- Stadium: San Mamés
- La Liga: 17th
- Copa del Rey: Round of 32
- Top goalscorer: League: Aritz Aduriz (9 goals); All: Aritz Aduriz (9 goals)

The 2006–07 season was the 106th season in Athletic Bilbao's history and their 76th consecutive season in La Liga, the top division of Spanish football.

== Squad statistics ==
=== Appearances and goals ===
No.	Pos	Nat	Player	Total		La Liga		Copa del Rey	
No.	Pos	Nat	Player	Apps	Goals	Apps	Goals	Apps	Goals
1	GK	(Spain) ESP	Iñaki Lafuente	13	0	10+1	0	2	0
2	DF	(Spain) ESP	Unai Expósito	32	0	29+2	0	1	0
3	DF	(Spain) ESP	Javier Casas	21	0	18+1	0	2	0
4	DF	(Spain) ESP	Ustaritz Aldekoaotalora	16	0	11+4	0	1	0
5	DF	(Venezuela) VEN	Fernando Amorebieta	28	0	21+6	0	1	0
6	DF	(Spain) ESP	Josu Sarriegi	38	0	36	0	2	0
7	MF	(Spain) ESP	Tiko	5	0	1+4	0	0	0
8	MF	(Spain) ESP	Joseba Garmendia	16	1	6+10	1	0	0
9	FW	(Spain) ESP	Fernando Llorente	24	2	2+21	2	1	0
10	MF	(Spain) ESP	Francisco Yeste	40	6	31+7	5	1+1	1
11	MF	(Spain) ESP	Igor Gabilondo	34	4	27+6	3	1	1
12	DF	(Spain) ESP	Iban Zubiaurre	1	0	0+1	0	0	0
13	GK	(Spain) ESP	Dani Aranzubia	28	0	28	0	0	0
14	DF	(Spain) ESP	Luis Prieto	19	2	18+1	2	0	0
15	DF	(Spain) ESP	Andoni Iraola	37	5	35	5	1+1	0
16	MF	(Spain) ESP	Javi González	10	0	7+3	0	0	0
16	MF	(Spain) ESP	Pablo Orbaiz	11	0	10	0	1	0
17	FW	(Spain) ESP	Joseba Etxeberria	30	3	17+11	3	2	0
18	MF	(Spain) ESP	Carlos Gurpegui	0	0	0	0	0	0
19	DF	(Spain) ESP	Ander Murillo	36	1	31+3	1	2	0
20	FW	(Spain) ESP	Ismael Urzaiz	32	8	19+11	8	0+2	0
21	FW	(Spain) ESP	Mikel Dañobeitia	6	0	1+3	0	1+1	0
22	MF	(Mexico) MEX	Javier Iturriaga	6	0	1+3	0	2	0
23	FW	(Spain) ESP	Aritz Aduriz	35	9	27+7	9	1	0
24	MF	(Spain) ESP	Javi Martínez	36	3	32+3	3	0+1	0
25	GK	(Spain) ESP	Unai Alba	0	0	0	0	0	0
45	DF	(Spain) ESP	Gaizka Bergara	1	0	0+1	0	0	0
48	FW	(Spain) ESP	Urko Arroyo	0	0	0	0	0	0
	GK	(Spain) ESP	Aitor Alcalde	0	0	0	0	0	0
	MF	(Spain) ESP	Beñat	1	0	0+1	0	0	0

== Competitions ==
=== La Liga ===
==== League table ====
Pos	Team	Pld	W	D	L	GF	GA	GD	Pts	Qualification or relegation
15	Levante	38	10	12	16	38	54	−16	42	
16	Real Betis	38	8	16	14	36	49	−13	40 (Note: BET 3–0 ATH; ATH 1–2 BET)	
17	Athletic Bilbao	38	10	10	18	44	62	−18	40	
18	Celta (R)	38	10	9	19	40	59	−19	39	Relegation to the Segunda División
19	Real Sociedad (R)	38	8	11	19	30	46	−16	35	Relegation to the Segunda División

Source: LFP
Rules for classification: 1st points; 2nd head-to-head points; 3rd head-to-head goal difference; 4th head-to-head goals scored; 5th goal difference; 6th number of goals scored; 7th Fair-play points
(R) Relegated
