= List of transfers of La Liga – 2006–07 season =

This is a list of transfers of La Liga in the La Liga during the winter and summer 2006–07 transfer windows, grouped by club transfers in and out. The Primera División (First Division) of the Liga Nacional de Fútbol Profesional (LFP), commonly known in the English-speaking world as La Liga is the top professional association football division of the Spanish football league system.

== Winter Window ==
=== Atlético Madrid ===
In

- (Brazil) Fabiano Eller – Signed From Trabzonspor
- (Brazil) Diego da Silva – Signed From Sporting Braga

Out

- (Spain) Ismael Falcón – On Loan To Hércules CF
- (Spain) Zahinos – On Loan To Albacete Balompié
- (Spain) Gabi – Transferred To Real Zaragoza (In June)
- (Brazil) Diego da Silva – On Loan To Sporting Braga

=== Athletic Bilbao ===
In

- (Spain) Unai Alba – Signed From Barakaldo CF

Out

- (Spain) Aritz Solabarrieta – Transferred To Atlético Madrid B

=== Real Betis ===
In

- (Argentina) Juan Caffa – Signed From Arsenal de Sarandí
- (Slovenia) Ilič – On Loan From NK Domžale
- (France) Pancrate – On Loan From Paris Saint-Germain F.C.

=== Celta de Vigo ===
In

- (Serbia) Maric – Return From UD Las Palmas
- (France) Bamogo – On Loan From Olympique de Marseille
- (Portugal) Areias – On Loan From F.C. Porto

Out

=== Deportivo de La Coruña ===
Out

- (Spain) Rodri – On Loan To UD Almería
- (Spain) Iván Carril – On Loan To CF Palencia
- (Spain) Ángel Guirado – On Loan To CD Lugo
- (Spain) Álvaro Arbeloa – Transferred To Liverpool F.C.

=== RCD Espanyol ===
Out

- (Mozambique) Armando Sá – On Loan To Leeds United A.F.C.
- (Spain) Albert Yagüe – On Loan To Lorca Deportiva CF
- (Spain) Jonathan Soriano – On Loan To Polideportivo Ejido
- (Spain) Sergio Sánchez – On Loan To Real Madrid Castilla
- (Brazil) Fredson – On Loan To São Paulo
- (Portugal) César Peixoto – Released

=== Getafe CF ===
In

- (Latvia) Verpakovskis – On Loan From FC Dynamo Kyiv

Out

- (Brazil) Jajá – On Loan To K.R.C. Genk
- (Serbia) Paunović – Transferred To FC Rubin Kazan

=== Gimnàstic de Tarragona ===
In

- (Spain) Rubén Castro – On Loan From Deportivo de La Coruña
- (Spain) César Navas – On Loan From Málaga CF
- (Argentina) Jose Maria Calvo – On Loan From CA Boca Juniors
- (France) Chabaud – Signed From R. Charleroi S.C.
- (Sweden) Grahn – Signed From Odense BK

Out

- (Paraguay) Cáceres – Transferred To UANL Tigres
- (Spain) Manolo Martínez – Transferred To CD Tenerife
- (Spain) Abel Buades – Transferred To Cádiz CF

=== Levante UD ===
In

- (Argentina) Gustavo Reggi – Signed From UD Las Palmas
- (Spain) Salva Ballesta – On Loan From Málaga CF

Out

- (Spain) Carmelo – On Loan To Hércules CF
- (Bulgaria) Manchev – On Loan To Real Valladolid
- (France) Luyindula – Transferred To Paris Saint-Germain F.C.

=== Racing de Santander ===
Out

- (Spain) Neru – Transferred To Cádiz CF
- (Morocco) Walid Regragui – Transferred To Dijon FCO

=== RCD Mallorca ===
In

- (Argentina) Óscar Trejo – Signed From CA Boca Juniors

Out

- (Argentina) Pisculichi – Transferred To Al-Arabi Sports Club
- (Cameroon) Daniel Kome – Transferred To Real Valladolid

=== CA Osasuna ===
Out

- (Spain) Ivan Rosado – Transferred To Málaga CF

=== Real Madrid ===
In

- (Brazil) Marcelo – Signed From Fluminense Football Club
- (France) Higuaín – Signed From River Plate
- (Argentina) Gago – Signed From Boca Juniors

Out

- (England) Beckham – Transferred To Los Angeles Galaxy (In June)
- (Brazil) Ronaldo – Transferred To A.C. Milan

=== Real Sociedad ===
In

- (Argentina) Victor López – Signed From Arsenal de Sarandí
- (Argentina) Germán Herrera – Signed From Grêmio Foot-Ball Porto Alegrense
- (Brazil) Sávio – Signed From Clube de Regatas do Flamengo
- (Spain) Jesuli – On Loan From Sevilla FC

Out

- (Spain) Javier Garrido – Transferred To Manchester City F.C.
- (Portugal) Fábio Felício – Transferred To FC Rubin Kazan
- (Spain) Cifuentes – On Loan To SD Ponferradina
- (Spain) Imanol Agirretxe – On Loan To CD Castellón
- (Brazil) Rossato – On Loan To U.D. Leiria

=== Recreativo de Huelva ===
Out

- (Spain) Antonio Calle – Transferred To Albacete Balompié
- (Equatorial Guinea) (Spain) Juvenal – Transferred To CD Tenerife

=== Sevilla FC ===
In

- (Russia) Kerzhakov – Signed From FC Zenit Saint Petersburg
- (Argentina) Fazio – Signed From Ferro Carril Oeste

Out

- (Spain) Jesuli – On Loan To Real Sociedad
- (Spain) Kepa Blanco – On Loan To West Ham United F.C.
- (Spain) Bruno Herrero – On Loan To Real Murcia
- (Spain) Antonio López – Transferred To CD Castellón

=== Valencia CF ===
Out

- (Italy) Tavano – On Loan To A.S. Roma
- (Argentina) Roberto Ayala – Transferred To Villarreal CF (In June)

=== Villarreal CF ===
In

- (Chile) Matías Fernández – Signed From Colo-Colo
- (Denmark) Jon Dahl Tomasson – On Loan From VfB Stuttgart
- (Argentina) Roberto Ayala – Signed From Valencia CF (In June)
- (Uruguay) Martín Cáceres – Signed From Defensor Sporting

Out

- (Argentina) Juan Román Riquelme – On Loan To Club Atlético Boca Juniors

=== Real Zaragoza ===
In

- (Brazil) Gustavo Nery – On Loan From SC Corinthians
- (Spain) Gabi – Transferred From Atlético Madrid (In June)

Out

- (Argentina) Leo Ponzio – Transferred To Club Atlético River Plate

== Summer Window ==
=== Athletic Bilbao ===
In:

- (Spain) Josu Sarriegi – Signed From Deportivo Alavés
- (Spain) Zubiaurre – Signed From Real Sociedad
- (Spain) Ibón Gutiérrez – Return From CD Numancia
- (Spain) Gorka Azkorra – Return From CD Numancia
- (Spain) Gabilondo – Signed From Real Sociedad
- (Spain) Javi Martínez – Signed From CA Osasuna
- (Spain) Alex García – Signed From Racing B

Out:

- (Spain) Javier Tarantino – On Loan To CD Numancia
- (Spain) Julen Guerrero – Retired
- (Spain) Gorka Azkorra – Transferred To Albacete Balompié
- (Spain) Kevin Lacruz – Transferred To RCD Espanyol
- (Spain) Felipe Guréndez – Transferred To CD Numancia
- (Spain) Joseba Arriaga – Transferred To UD Las Palmas
- (Spain) Ibón Gutiérrez – On Loan To CD Castellón
- (Spain) Endika Bordas – Transferred To CE L'Hospitalet
- (Spain) Carlos Gurpegi – Sanctioned

=== Atlético Madrid ===
In:

- (Argentina) Sergio Agüero – Signed From Independiente
- (Argentina) (Spain) Mariano Pernía – Signed From Getafe CF
- (Netherlands) (European Union) Kiki Musampa – Return From Manchester City F.C.
- (Portugal) (European Union) Costinha – Signed From FC Dynamo Moscow
- (Greece) (European Union) Yourkas Seitaridis – Signed From FC Dynamo Moscow
- (Portugal) (European Union) Zé Castro – Signed From Académica de Coimbra
- (Spain) Miguel de las Cuevas – Signed From Hércules CF
- (Spain) Raúl Medina – Return From Ciudad de Murcia
- (Spain) Mista – Signed From Valencia CF
- (Spain) Jurado – Signed From Real Madrid
- (Portugal) (European Union) Maniche – Signed From FC Dynamo Moscow

Out:

- (Argentina) (Spain) Javier Pinola – On Loan To 1. FC Nürnberg
- (Spain) Manu del Moral – Transferred To Getafe CF
- (Romania) (Spain) Cosmin Contra – Transferred To Getafe CF
- (Spain) Juanma Ortiz – On Loan To Polideportivo Ejido
- (Spain) Gonzalo Colsa – Transferred To Racing de Santander
- (Spain) Jorge Larena – Transferred To Celta de Vigo
- (Uruguay) Sosa – On Loan To River Plate
- (Spain) Braulio – On Loan To UD Salamanca
- (Spain) Toché – On Loan To Real Valladolid
- (Spain) Gª Calvo – Transferred To Real Valladolid
- (Spain) Molinero – On Loan To Málaga CF
- (Serbia) Mateja Kežman – Transferred To Fenerbahçe SK
- (Argentina) Ariel Ibagaza – Transferred To RCD Mallorca
- (Spain) Juan Velasco – Transferred To RCD Espanyol
- (Spain) Mario Suárez – On Loan To Real Valladolid
- (Netherlands) (European Union) Musampa – Transferred To Trabzonspor

=== FC Barcelona ===
In:

- (Argentina) (Spain) Javier Saviola – Return From Sevilla FC
- (Iceland) Eiður Guðjohnsen – Signed From Chelsea F.C.
- (Italy) (European Union) Gianluca Zambrotta – Signed From Juventus FC
- (France) (European Union) Lilian Thuram – Signed From Juventus FC

Out:

- (Sweden) (European Union) Henrik Larsson – Transferred To Helsingborgs IF
- (Spain) Gabri – Transferred To AFC Ajax
- (Turkey) (Spain) Rüştü Reçber – Transferred To Fenerbahçe SK
- (Argentina) (Italy) Maxi López – On Loan To RCD Mallorca
- (Netherlands) (European Union) Mark van Bommel – Transferred To FC Bayern Munich
- (Spain) Francisco Martos – Transferred To PFC CSKA Sofia
- (Spain) Fernando Navarro – Transferred To RCD Mallorca
- (Spain) Dani Fernández – Transferred To Metalurh Donetsk
- (Spain) Cristian Hidalgo – Transferred To Deportivo La Coruña
- (Spain) Óscar López – Transferred To Real Betis
- (Spain) Damià Abella – Transferred To Real Betis
- (Spain) Rodri – Transferred To Deportivo de La Coruña
- (Spain) Joan Verdú – Transferred To Deportivo de La Coruña

=== Real Betis ===
In

| 7 | DF | ESP | Damià Abella (from FC Barcelona) (€1.0 million) |
| — | GK | ESP | Casto (from Albacete Balompié) (free transfer) |
| 10 | FW | BRA | Edú (from Celta de Vigo) (€2.0 million) |
| 16 | DF | ESP | Oscar López (from FC Barcelona) (€200,000) |
| 24 | FW | ESP | Francisco José Maldonado (from Lorca Deportiva CF) (€62,000) |
| 23 | MF | GER | David Odonkor (from Borussia Dortmund) (€6.5 million) |
| 3 | DF | ESP | Enrique Romero (from Deportivo de La Coruña) (free transfer) |
| 25 | FW | BRA | Rafael Sóbis (from Sport Club Internacional) (€8.5 million) |
| 22 | DF | ESP | Fernando Vega (from Lorca Deportiva CF) (free transfer) |
| 16 | MF | SUI | Johann Vogel (from A.C. Milan) (player exchange) |
| 17 | MF | BRA | Jorge Wágner (from Sport Club Internacional) (€200,000) |

Total Spent: €18,462,000

Out

| 23 | MF | EQG | Benjamín (released) |
| 10 | MF | ESP | Juan Cañas (to CD Alcalá) (free transfer) |
| 22 | DF | ITA | Paolo Castellini (to Parma F.C.) (free transfer) |
| 2 | DF | ESP | Luis Fernández (to Racing de Santander) (free transfer) |
| 17 | MF | ESP | Joaquín (to Valencia CF) (€25.0 million) |
| — | FW | ESP | Pablo Niño (to Mérida UD) (free transfer) |
| 25 | FW | BRA | Ricardo Oliveira (to A.C. Milan) (€17.0 million, player exchange) |
| — | DF | ESP | Jaime Pérez (to Castillo CF) (free transfer) |
| 11 | FW | BRA | Diego Tardelli (return to São Paulo Futebol Clube, to São Caetano, loaned to PSV Eindhoven) |
| 7 | DF | ESP | Fernando Varela (to RCD Mallorca) (free transfer) |

Total Received: €42,000,000

==== Loaned players ====
Note: Flags indicate national team as defined under FIFA eligibility rules; some limited exceptions apply. Players may hold more than one non-FIFA nationality.

| No. | Pos. | Nation | Player |
|---|---|---|---|
| 26 | MF | ESP | Israel (to Mérida UD until June 2008) |
| — | MF | ESP | Juanlu (to CA Osasuna until June 2007) |
| 16 | DF | ESP | Oscar López (to Gimnàstic de Tarragona until June 2007) |

=== Celta de Vigo ===
In:

- (Spain) Antonio Guayre – Signed From Villarreal CF
- (Brazil) (Italy) George Lucas – Signed From Atlético Mineiro
- (Spain) Jorge Larena – Signed From Atlético Madrid
- (Spain) Toni Moral – Return From CD Tenerife
- (Brazil) Nenê – Signed From Deportivo Alavés
- (Romania) Gabriel Tamaș – Signed From Spartak Moscow
- (Uruguay) (Spain) Pablo García – On Loan From Real Madrid

Out:

- (Spain) David Silva – Return To Valencia CF
- (Spain) José Enrique – Return To Valencia CF
- (Brazil) (Italy) Edú – Transferred To Real Betis
- (Spain) Juan Sánchez – Retired
- (Spain) Sergio – Transferred To Real Zaragoza
- (Spain) Iago Bouzón – On Loan To Recreativo de Huelva
- (Spain) Toni Moral – Transferred To Deportivo Alavés
- (Mexico) Carlos Vela – On Loan To UD Salamanca
- (Argentina) Sebastián Méndez – Transferred To San Lorenzo de Almagro

=== RC Deportivo La Coruña ===
In:

- (Spain) Alberto Lopo – Signed From RCD Espanyol
- (Argentina) (Italy) Lionel Scaloni – Return From West Ham United F.C.
- (Spain) Pablo Álvarez – Signed From Sporting de Gijón
- (Spain) Juan Rodríguez – Signed From Málaga CF
- (Spain) Riki – Signed From Getafe CF
- (Equatorial Guinea) (Spain) Rodolfo Bodipo – Signed From Deportivo Alavés
- (Spain) Cristian Hidalgo – Signed From FC Barcelona B
- (Spain) Antonio Barragán – Signed From Liverpool F.C.
- (Uruguay) (Italy) Fabián Estoyanoff – On Loan From Valencia CF
- (Spain) Rodri – Signed From FC Barcelona B
- (Spain) Álvaro Arbeloa – Signed From Real Madrid Castilla
- (Spain) Joan Verdú – Signed From FC Barcelona B
- (Israel) (France) Dudu Aouate – Signed From Racing de Santander
- (Spain) Antonio Tomás – Signed From Racing de Santander
- (Brazil) (Italy) Filipe Luís Kasmirski – On Loan From C.A. Rentistas

Out:

- (Spain) Paco Gallardo – Return To Sevilla FC
- (Spain) Enrique Romero – Transferred To Real Betis
- (Spain) Dani Mallo – Transferred To S.C. Braga
- (Spain) Xisco – On Loan To UD Vecindario
- (Spain) Iván Carril – On Loan To UD Vecindario
- (Spain) José Francisco Molina – Transferred To Levante UD
- (Spain) César – Transferred To Levante UD
- (Spain) Héctor – Transferred To RCD Mallorca
- (Spain) Pedro Munitis – Transferred To Racing de Santander
- (Spain) Victor – Transferred To Panathinaikos
- (Spain) Ángel Guirado – On Loan To UD Vecindario
- (Spain) Senel – On Loan To Málaga B
- (Spain) Momo – On Loan To Racing de Santander
- (Spain) Rubén Castro – On Loan To Gimnàstic de Tarragona
- (Spain) Pablo Amo – On Loan To Recreativo de Huelva
- (Spain) Antonio Tomás – On Loan To Recreativo de Huelva
- (Spain) Diego Tristán – Transferred To RCD Mallorca
- (Argentina) (Italy) Lionel Scaloni – Transferred To Racing de Santander

=== RCD Espanyol ===
In:

- (Spain) Riera – Return From Manchester City F.C.
- (Morocco) (Spain) Moha Signed From CA Osasuna
- (Spain) J. Soriano – Return From UD Almería
- (Spain) Lacruz – Signed From Athletic de Bilbao
- (Spain) Rufete – Signed From Valencia CF
- (Brazil) Jônatas – Signed From Clube de Regatas do Flamengo
- (Spain) Velasco – Signed From Atlético Madrid

Out:

- (Argentina) Martín Posse – Transferred To Club Almagro
- (Spain) Lopo – Transferred To Deportivo de La Coruña
- (Argentina) (Spain) Pochettino – Retired
- (Spain) Juanfran – Return To Real Madrid Castilla
- (France) (European Union) Domi – Transferred To Olympiacos
- (Netherlands) (Spain) Jordi Cruyff – Transferred To Metalurh Donetsk
- (Spain) Jofre – Transferred To Real Murcia
- (Spain) Robusté – On Loan To Polideportivo Ejido

=== Getafe CF ===
In:

- (Spain) Nacho – Signed From Málaga CF
- (Spain) Manu del Moral – On Loan From Atlético Madrid
- (Spain) David Sousa – Signed From Real Valladolid
- (Spain) Alexis – Signed From Málaga CF
- (Romania) (Spain) Cosmin Contra – Signed From Atlético Madrid
- (Spain) Javier Casquero – Signed From Racing de Santander
- (Spain) David Cortés – Signed From RCD Mallorca
- (Uruguay) Juan Ángel Albín – Signed From Club Nacional de Football
- (Argentina) Roberto Abbondanzieri – Signed From Boca Juniors
- (Argentina) Lucas Licht – Signed From Club de Gimnasia y Esgrima La Plata

Out:

- (Argentina) (Spain) Mariano Pernía – Transferred To Atlético Madrid
- (Spain) Jaime Gavilán – Return To Valencia CF
- (Romania) Gheorghe Craioveanu – Retired
- (Spain) Riki – Transferred To Deportivo de La Coruña
- (Spain) Diego Rivas – Transferred To Real Sociedad
- (Spain) Nano – Transferred To Cádiz CF
- (Spain) Juan Calatayud – Return To Málaga CF
- (Argentina) Aníbal Matellán – Transferred To Gimnàstic de Tarragona
- (Spain) David Cubillo – Transferred To Rayo Vallecano
- (Brazil) Jajá – On loan To Clube de Regatas do Flamengo

=== Gimnàstic de Tarragona ===
In:

- (Spain) Mingo – Signed From Albacete Balompié
- (Spain) Juan – Signed From Sporting de Gijón
- (Argentina) (Italy) Albano Bizzarri – Signed From Real Valladolid
- (Spain) Alejandro Campano – Signed From RCD Mallorca
- (Argentina) Aníbal Matellán – Signed From Getafe CF
- (Spain) David Generelo – On Loan From Real Zaragoza
- (Spain) David Pirri – Signed From Albacete Balompié
- (Spain) Javier Portillo – Signed From Real Madrid
- (Democratic Republic of the Congo) Ariza Makukula – On Loan From Sevilla FC
- (Paraguay) Julio Cáceres – On Loan From FC Nantes Atlantique
- (Brazil) Gil – Signed From Cruzeiro
- (Spain) Óscar López – On Loan From Real Betis

Out:

- (Argentina) (Italy) Cristian Lupidio – Return To Hércules CF
- (Spain) Diego Torres – Transferred To Rayo Vallecano
- (Spain) Lluis Codina – Transferred To SD Eibar
- (Spain) Diego Reyes – Transferred To Córdoba CF
- (Spain) Bolo – Transferred To CD Numancia
- (Spain) Álex Pérez – Transferred To Real Madrid Castilla
- (Nigeria) Abdulrazak Ekpoki – Transferred To UD Vecindario

=== Levante UD ===
In:

- (Spain) Manolo Gaspar – Signed From UD Almería
- (Spain) Nino – Signed From Elche CF
- (France) (European Union) Frédéric Déhu – Signed From Olympique de Marseille
- (France) (European Union) Laurent Robert – Signed From S.L. Benfica
- (Italy) (European Union) Damiano Tommasi – Signed From A.S. Roma
- (Spain) César – Signed From Deportivo de La Coruña
- (Brazil) Álvaro – Signed From Real Zaragoza
- (Cameroon) Albert Meyong – Signed From CF Os Belenenses
- (France) (Ivory Coast) (European Union) Olivier Kapo – Signed From Juventus FC
- (France) (European Union) Mathieu Berson – Signed From Aston Villa
- (Brazil) Zé Maria – Signed From Internazionale FC
- (Spain) José Francisco Molina – Signed From Deportivo La Coruña
- (France) (European Union) Péguy Luyindula – On Loan From Olympique de Marseille

Out

- (Spain) Javi Rodríguez – On Loan To Lorca Deportiva CF
- (Spain) Juan Carlos Ceballos – Transferred To Ciudad de Murcia
- (Brazil) Fernando Lombardi – Return To Paraná Clube
- (Colombia) Edwin Congo – Transferred To Sporting de Gijón
- (Spain) José Antonio Culebras – Transferred To CD Tenerife
- (Spain) Sandro – Transferred To Málaga CF
- (Spain) Jesule – Transferred To Málaga CF
- (Spain) Nagore – Transferred To CD Numancia

=== Real Madrid CF ===
In:

- (Mali) Mahamadou Diarra – Signed From Lyon (€26m)
- (Italy) (European Union) Fabio Cannavaro – Signed From Juventus FC (€7m)
- (Brazil) (Germany) Emerson – Signed From Juventus FC (€16m)
- (Netherlands) (European Union) Ruud van Nistelrooy – Signed From Manchester United (€15m)
- (Spain) José Antonio Reyes On Loan From Arsenal F.C.

Out:

- (France) (European Union) Zinedine Zidane – Retired
- (Spain) Roberto Soldado – On Loan To CA Osasuna
- (Spain) Álvaro Arbeloa – Transferred To Deportivo de La Coruña (€1,3m)
- (Spain) Jurado – Transferred To Atlético Madrid (€3m)
- (Spain) Javier Portillo Transferred To Gimnàstic de Tarragona (Free transfer)
- (Equatorial Guinea) (Spain) Javier Balboa – On Loan To Racing de Santander
- (Spain) Rubén – Transferred To Racing de Santander
- (Uruguay) (Italy) Carlos Diogo – On Loan To Real Zaragoza
- (Uruguay) (Spain) Pablo García – On Loan To Celta de Vigo
- (Spain) Juanfran – Transferred To CA Osasuna
- (Denmark) (European Union) Thomas Gravesen – Transferred To Celtic
- (England) (European Union) Jonathan Woodgate – On Loan To Middlesbrough
- (Spain) Borja Fernández – Transferred To Real Valladolid
- (Brazil) Júlio Baptista – On Loan To Arsenal F.C.

=== RCD Mallorca ===
In:

- (Spain) Jordi López – Signed From Sevilla FC
- (Spain) Varela – Signed From Real Betis
- (Argentina) (Italy) Maxi López – On Loan From FC Barcelona
- (Spain) Fernando Navarro – Signed From FC Barcelona
- (Spain) Javier Dorado – Signed From Sporting de Gijón
- (Spain) Héctor – Signed From Deportivo de La Coruña
- (Cameroon) (Spain) Daniel Kome – Return From Ciudad de Murcia
- (Spain) Iván Ramis – Return From Real Valladolid
- (Argentina) Ariel Ibagaza – Signed From Atlético Madrid
- (Serbia) Boško Janković – Signed From Red Star Belgrade
- (Spain) Diego Tristán – Signed From Deportivo La Coruña

Out:

- (Spain) Borja – Return To Real Madrid
- (Japan) Yoshito Ōkubo – Return To Cerezo Osaka
- (Spain) Braulio – Return To Atlético Madrid
- (Spain) David Cortés – Transferred To Getafe CF
- (Spain) Yordi – Transferred To Xerez CD
- (Spain) Alejandro Campano – Transferred To Gimnàstic de Tarragona
- (Italy) (European Union) Alessandro Potenza – Return To Internazionale
- (Argentina) Eduardo Tuzzio – Transferred To River Plate
- (Argentina) Francisco Maciel – Transferred To Racing Club de Avellaneda
- (Montenegro) Andrija Delibašić – On Loan To AEK Athens F.C.
- (Mozambique) Paíto – On Loan To S.C. Braga
- (Italy) (European Union) Cristiano Doni – Transferred To Atalanta B.C.

=== CA Osasuna ===
In:

- (Spain) Héctor Font – Signed From Villarreal CF
- (Iran) Javad Nekounam – Signed From Sharjah FC
- (Spain) Iván Rosado – Return From Xerez CD
- (Panama) (Spain) Jaime Penedo – Signed From Cagliari Calcio
- (Spain) Roberto Soldado – On Loan From Real Madrid
- (Spain) Juanlu – On Loan From Real Betis
- (Spain) Juanfran – Signed From Real Madrid

Out:

- (Uruguay) Marcelo Sosa – Return To Atlético Madrid
- (Morocco) (Spain) Moha Transferred To RCD Espanyol
- (Spain) Juanma Ortiz – Return To Atlético Madrid
- (Spain) Fran Moreno – On Loan To CD Numancia
- (Spain) Rafael Clavero – Transferred To CD Tenerife
- (Spain) Iván Rosado – Transferred To Málaga CF

=== Real Racing Club Santander ===
In:

- (Argentina) (Spain) Cristian Álvarez – Return From CD Tenerife
- (Spain) David Aganzo – Return From Beitar Jerusalem FC
- (Spain) Gonzalo Colsa – Signed From Atlético Madrid
- (Spain) Luis Fernández – Signed From Real Betis
- (Spain) Pedro Munitis – Signed From Deportivo de La Coruña
- (Spain) Momo – On Loan From Deportivo de La Coruña
- (Spain) Juan Calatayud – Signed From Getafe CF
- (Equatorial Guinea) (Spain) Javier Balboa – On Loan From Real Madrid
- (Spain) Rubén González – Signed From Real Madrid
- (Spain) Antonio Tomás – On Loan From Deportivo de La Coruña
- (Spain) Toño – On Loan From Recreativo de Huelva
- (Serbia) Nikola Žigić – Signed From Red Star Belgrade
- (Argentina) (Italy) Lionel Scaloni- Signed From Deportivo de La Coruña

Out:

- (Spain) Rubén Castro – On Loan To Gimnàstic de Tarragona
- (Spain) Antoñito – Return To Sevilla FC
- (Spain) Pablo Casar – Transferred To Deportivo Alavés
- (Spain) Javier Casquero – Transferred To Getafe CF
- (Spain) Damiá – Return To FC Barcelona
- (Spain) Jonatan Valle – Transferred To Málaga CF
- (Chile) Mauricio Pinilla – Transferred To Heart of Midlothian
- (Israel) Dudu Aouate – Transferred To Deportivo de La Coruña
- (Spain) Álex García – Transferred To Athletic Bilbao B
- (Spain) Samuel San José – On Loan To Sporting de Gijón
- (Spain) Antonio Tomás – Transferred To Deportivo de La Coruña
- (Spain) Fernando Marqués – Transferred To Atlético Madrid B
- (Spain) Rubén García – On Loan To UE Lleida
- (France) (European Union) Stéphane Dalmat Transferred To FC Girondins de Bordeaux
- (France) (European Union) Wilfried Dalmat Transferred To R.A.E.C. Mons

=== Sevilla FC ===
In:

- (Germany) (European Union) Andreas Hinkel – Signed From VfB Stuttgart
- (Denmark) (European Union) Christian Poulsen – Signed From FC Schalke 04
- (Spain) Antonio López – Return From Málaga CF
- (Spain) David Cobeño – Signed From Real Madrid Castilla
- (Portugal) (European Union) Duda – Signed From Málaga CF
- (Uruguay) Javier Chevantón – Signed From AS Monaco

Out

- (Spain) Carlitos – Transferred To Granada CF
- (Argentina) (Spain) Javier Saviola – Return To FC Barcelona
- (Spain) Hugo Notario – Transferred To Real Murcia
- (Spain) Jordi López – Transferred To RCD Mallorca
- (Spain) Manuel Blanco – On Loan To CD Tenerife
- (Spain) Antoñito – Transferred To Real Murcia
- (Spain) Francisco Gallardo – Transferred To Real Murcia
- (Spain) Carlos Aranda – Transferred To Real Murcia
- (Democratic Republic of the Congo) Ariza Makukula – Transferred To Gimnàstic de Tarragona

=== Real Sociedad ===
In:

- (Portugal) (European Union) Fábio Felício – Signed From UD Leiria
- (Brazil) (Italy) Adriano Rossato – Return From S.C. Braga
- (Spain) Juanito – Signed From Deportivo Alavés
- (Chile) Claudio Bravo – Signed From Colo-Colo
- (Spain) Gerardo – Signed From Málaga CF
- (Spain) Diego Rivas – Signed From Getafe CF

Out

- (Turkey) (European Union) Nihat Kahveci – Transferred To Villarreal CF
- (Chile) (Spain) Mark González – Return To Liverpool F.C.
- (Colombia) Jhon Viáfara – Return To Portsmouth F.C.
- (Spain) Alberto – Transferred To Real Valladolid
- (Spain) Óscar de Paula – Transferred To Cádiz CF
- (Spain) Igor Gabilondo – Transferred To Athletic de Bilbao
- (Spain) José Barkero – Transferred To Albacete Balompié
- (Spain) Gorka Larrea – On Loan To UD Almería
- (Spain) Markel Bergara – On Loan To UD Vecindario
- (France) (European Union) Jérémie Bréchet – Transferred To FC Sochaux-Montbéliard
- (Spain) Sergio Boris – Transferred To Numancia

=== RC Recreativo de Huelva ===
In:

- (Spain) César Arzo – On Loan From Villarreal CF
- (Spain) Jesús Vázquez – Signed From CD Tenerife
- (Spain) Edu Moya – Signed From CD Tenerife
- (Spain) Javier López Vallejo – On Loan From Villarreal CF
- (Spain) Santi Cazorla – Signed From Villarreal CF
- (Spain) Iago Bouzón – On Loan From Celta de Vigo
- (Spain) Dani Bautista – Signed From Sevilla FC
- (Spain) Mario – Signed From Real Valladolid
- (Spain) Poli – Signed From Deportivo Alavés
- (France) Bertrand Laquait – Signed From Charleroi
- (France) Florent Sinama Pongolle – On Loan From Liverpool
- (Portugal) Beto – On Loan From Bordeaux
- (Spain) Pablo Amo – On Loan From Deportivo
- (Spain) Javi Guerrero – Signed From Celta de Vigo
- (Spain) Juanma Gómez – On Loan From Levante

Out

- (Spain) Ignacio Benítez – Transferred To Hércules CF
- (Spain) Xavi Jimenez – On Loan To Ciudad de Murcia
- (Spain) Mateo – Transferred To Deportivo Alavés
- (Argentina) (Spain) Gastón Casas – Transferred To Elche CF
- (Ecuador) Valencia – Return To Villarreal CF
- (Spain) Iker Begoña – Transferred To Lorca Deportiva CF
- (Spain) Toño – Transferred To Racing de Santander
- (Spain) Ramón – Transferred To Real Murcia
- (Spain) Galván – Transferred To UE Lleida
- (Spain) Valero – Transferred To UDA Gramenet

=== Valencia CF ===
In:

- (Spain) David Silva – Return From Celta de Vigo
- (Spain) Gavilán – Return From Getafe CF
- (Italy) (European Union) Bernardo Corradi – Return From Parma F.C.
- (Italy) (European Union) Stefano Fiore – Return From ACF Fiorentina
- (Spain) Javier Garrido – Return From Albacete Balompié
- (Spain) Fernando Morientes – Signed From Liverpool F.C.
- (Spain) Asier del Horno – Signed From Chelsea
- (Italy) (European Union) Francesco Tavano – Signed From Empoli F.C.
- (Spain) Joaquín – Signed From Real Betis (€25m)

Out:

- (Italy) (European Union) Amedeo Carboni – Retired
- (Italy) (European Union) Marco Di Vaio -Transferred To AS Monaco
- (Brazil) (Italy) Fábio Aurélio – Transferred To Liverpool F.C.
- (Spain) José Enrique – Transferred To Villarreal CF
- (Uruguay) (Italy) Fabián Estoyanoff – On Loan To Deportivo de La Coruña
- (European Union) Caneira – On Loan To Sporting Clube de Portugal
- (Italy) (European Union) Bernardo Corradi – Transferred To Manchester City F.C.
- (Spain) Francisco Rufete – Transferred To RCD Espanyol
- (Spain) Mista – Transferred To Atlético Madrid
- (Argentina) Pablo Aimar – Transferred To Real Zaragoza
- (Spain) Javier Garrido – Transferred To Lorca Deportiva CF
- (Netherlands) (European Union) Patrick Kluivert – Transferred To PSV Eindhoven
- (Italy) (European Union) Stefano Fiore – On Loan To Torino FC

=== Villarreal CF ===
In:

- (Turkey) (European Union) Nihat Kahveci- Signed From Real Sociedad
- (France) (European Union) Robert Pires – Signed From Arsenal F.C.
- (Spain) Cani – Signed From Real Zaragoza
- (Spain) José Enrique – Signed From Valencia CF
- (Argentina) (Italy) Leandro Somoza- Signed from CA Vélez Sársfield
- (Argentina) (Italy) Fabricio Fuentes – Signed From Club Atlas
- (France) (European Union) Pascal Cygan – Signed From Arsenal F.C.

Out:

- (Argentina) Juan Pablo Sorín – Transferred To Hamburger SV
- (Spain) Antonio Guayre – Transferred To Celta de Vigo
- (Spain) César Arzo – On Loan To Recreativo de Huelva
- (Spain) Roger García – Transferred To Ajax Amsterdam
- (Spain) Xisco Nadal – Transferred To Hércules CF
- (Spain) Javier López Vallejo – On Loan To Recreativo de Huelva
- (Spain) Héctor Font – Transferred To CA Osasuna
- (Spain) Santi Cazorla – Transferred To Recreativo de Huelva
- (Ecuador) Valencia On Loan To Wigan Athletic
- (Spain) Javier Calleja – Transferred To Málaga CF
- (Spain) Carlos Alcántara – On Loan To Real Jaén

=== Real Zaragoza ===
In:

- (Argentina) (Italy) Andrés D'Alessandro – On Loan From VfL Wolfsburg
- (Spain) Sergio – Signed From Celta de Vigo
- (Spain) Juanfran – Signed From Beşiktaş
- (Spain) Corona – Return From Albacete Balompié
- (Argentina) Pablo Aimar – Signed From Valencia CF
- (Spain) Gerard Piqué – On Loan From Manchester United
- (Spain) Miguel Martínez – Return From UE Lleida
- (Spain) Antonio Longás – Promoted From Real Zaragoza B
- (Uruguay) (Italy) Carlos Diogo – On Loan From Real Madrid

Out:

- (Brazil) (France) Sávio – Transferred To Flamengo
- (Spain) Cani – Transferred To Villarreal CF
- (Paraguay) Delio Toledo – Transferred To Kayserispor
- (Spain) Piti – On Loan To Hércules CF
- (Spain) Capi – Transferred To Real Murcia
- (Brazil) Álvaro – Transferred To Levante UD
- (Spain) David Generelo – On Loan To Gimnàstic de Tarragona
- (Spain) Corona – On Loan To UD Almería
- (Spain) Raúl Valbuena – On Loan To Albacete Balompié
