= Txema Noriega =

Spanish footballer

Personal information
- Full name: José María Noriega Aldekoa
- Date of birth: 14 November 1958 (age 67)
- Place of birth: Bilbao, Spain
- Height: 1.78 m (5 ft 10 in)
- Position: Forward

Youth career
- Loyola-Indautxu
- 1974–1977: Athletic Bilbao

Senior career*
Years	Team	Apps	(Gls)
1977–1980	Bilbao Athletic	99	(31)
1980–1987	Athletic Bilbao	183	(41)
1987–1989	Tenerife	40	(3)
Total		322	(75)

Managerial career
- 2002–2003: Arenas Getxo
- 2003–2004: Barakaldo
- * Club domestic league appearances and goals

José María "Txema" Noriega Aldekoa (born 14 November 1958) is a Spanish former professional footballer who played as a forward.

His career was associated primarily with Athletic Bilbao, winning the national championship twice as a player in the 1980s and later serving as the club's director of football and the co-ordinator of its youth system.

== Playing career ==
=== Athletic Bilbao ===
Born in Bilbao, Biscay, Basque Country, Noriega was a graduate of Athletic Bilbao's youth system, having supported the club as a child. He made his senior debut with the reserve team, Bilbao Athletic, in the regionalised third tier during 1977–78. Towards the end of his third season featuring regularly for the reserves, he made his debut for the Athletic senior team on 16 March 1980, a 1–0 win away to Atlético Madrid in La Liga.

He was promoted at the start of the following campaign, and would feature in the majority of the team's matches for the next six seasons (232 appearances and 54 goals in all competitions), albeit often appearing from the bench or himself being substituted. Those years under coach Javier Clemente were one of the most successful periods in Athletic Bilbao's history, in which they were champions of Spain in 1982–83 and 1983–84, before finishing third in the next two seasons. They also won the 1984 Copa del Rey Final and were runners-up the following year – Noriega did not take part in either final but was involved in earlier rounds. He did play in the first leg of the 1983 Supercopa de España which Athletic lost to Barcelona (they were awarded the same trophy automatically the following year after winning the double). He also featured in the European Cup against the likes of Liverpool and was involved in further defeats to Barcelona at the semi-final stage of the cup in both 1981 and 1986, scoring in the former.

In 1986–87, Noriega's contribution was significantly diminished due to injury, not playing at all until April and registering only 267 minutes (scoring twice) in the league. He did manage to complete 90 minutes in what would be his final appearance for the club, a 2–1 win away to UD Las Palmas on 20 June 1987.

=== Tenerife ===
Noriega began the 1987–88 season with Athletic but did not play any competitive fixtures and soon moved on, dropping down to the second level to join newly promoted CD Tenerife on the eve of his 29th birthday. Injuries again hampered his progress during two seasons in the Canary Islands, but in the latter campaign he contributed 22 regular league appearances plus one in the playoffs as the club defeated Real Betis and returned to the top tier after a 28-year absence. Tenerife also praised his "nobility and professionalism" during his spell, after which he retired from playing professionally at the relatively young age of 30.

== Post-playing career ==
After his playing days ended, Noriega remained working in football, although it was more than a decade later when he was hired in a prominent position. After spending the 2003–04 season as the manager of Barakaldo CF in the third tier, in September 2004 he was appointed as Athletic Bilbao's director of football with special responsibility for the club's Lezama academy, after the appointment of Fernando Lamikiz as president.

Although credited for his involvement in bringing players such as Javi Martínez and Iker Muniain to the club, his three-year term was also associated with disappointing results on the field, with several coaches hired and dismissed, in addition to the 'Zubiaurre affair' where Athletic's approach to sign a player was ruled to be illegal, all of which led to Lamikiz's resignation halfway through his scheduled term. Noriega remained in post during the interim presidency of Ana Urkijo but was replaced when Fernando García Macua became president in the 2007 elections. He later expressed his disappointment that his efforts to add a winning mentality to the youth coaching at the club – by appointing experienced personnel such as former teammates Luis de la Fuente and Patxi Salinas – were derided as cronyism.

== Honours ==
Athletic Bilbao

- La Liga: 1982–83, 1983–84
