= Ricardo Irezábal =

Ricardo Irezábal may refer to:

- Ricardo Irezábal (footballer), Spanish footballer and president of Athletic Bilbao
- Ricardo de Irezábal, Spanish sports leader and president of Atlético Madrid
