= List of Athletic Bilbao presidents =

Athletic Bilbao is a professional association football club based in Bilbao, Spain, which plays in La Liga. This chronological list comprises all those who have held the position of president of the first team of Athletic Bilbao from 1901, when the first president was elected, to the present day. Each president's entry includes his dates of tenure, honours won and significant achievements while under his care.

== List of presidents ==
Name	Count	From	Until	Honours
Luis Márquez	(Spain)	1900	1901	
Juan Astorquia	(Spain)	1902	1903	1 Copa de la Coronación
Enrique Careaga	(Spain)	1903	1906	2 Copa del Rey
Ramón Aras	(Spain)	1906	1908	
Alberto Zarraoa	(Spain)	1908	1910	
Pedro de Astigarraga	(Spain)	1910	1911	1 Copa del Rey
Alejandro de la Sota	(England)	1911	1917	4 Copa del Rey
Pedro de Astigarraga	(Spain)	1917	1919	
Ricardo Irezábal	(Spain)	1919	1921	1 Copa del Rey
Ernesto Bourgeaud	(France)	1921	1922	
José Maria Vilallonga	(Spain)	1922	1923	1 Copa del Rey
Ricardo Irezábal	(Spain)	1923	1926	
Manuel de la Sota	(Spain)	1926	1929	
Manuel Castellanos	(Spain)	1929	1933	2 La Liga; 4 Copa del Rey
José María Olabarría	(Spain)	1933	1935	1 La Liga
Luis Casajuana	(Spain)	1935	1943	3 La Liga; 1 Copa del Rey
Roberto de Arteche	(Spain)	1943	1946	2 Copa del Rey
José María Larrea	(Spain)	1946	1950	1 Copa Eva Duarte
Enrique Guzmán Martínez	(Spain)	1950	1959	1 La Liga; 3 Copa del Rey
Javier Prado	(Spain)	1959	1965	
Julio Eguskiza	(Spain)	1 July 1965	25 October 1968	
Félix Oráa	(Spain)	1969	1973	2 Copa del Rey
José Antonio Egidazu	(Spain)	1973	1977	
Jesús María Duñabeitia	(Spain)	1977	1982	
Pedro Aurtenetxe	(Spain)	1982	1990	2 La Liga; 1 Copa del Rey; 1 Supercopa de España
José Julián Lertxundi	(Spain)	1 July 1990	17 March 1994	
José María Arrate	(Spain)	1 July 1994	30 June 2001	
Javier Uria	(Spain)	2001	2003	
Ignacio Ugartetxe	(Spain)	1 July 2003	31 October 2004	
Fernando Lamikiz Garai	(Spain)	31 October 2004	30 June 2006	
Ana Urkijo	(Spain)	1 July 2006	18 June 2007	
Fernando García Macua	(Spain)	1 July 2007	30 June 2011	
Josu Urrutia	(Spain)	7 July 2011	22 May 2018	1 Supercopa de España
Aitor Elizegi	(Spain)	31 May 2018	24 June 2022	1 Supercopa de España
Jon Uriarte	(Spain)	24 June 2022	Present	1 Copa del Rey
