= Ricardo Irezábal (footballer) =

Spanish footballer and sports leader

Ricardo de Irezábal
Personal information
- Full name: Ricardo Irezábal Goti
- Date of birth: 30 October 1883
- Place of birth: Bilbao, Spain
- Date of death: 29 April 1959 (aged 75)
- Place of death: Mexico City, Mexico
- Position: Goalkeeper

Senior career*
Years	Team	Apps	(Gls)
1908	Athletic Bilbao		

Managerial career
- 1937: Euzkadi
9th President of Athletic Bilbao
In office 1919–1921
Preceded by	Pedro de Astigarraga
Succeeded by	Ernesto Bourgeaud
12th President of Athletic Bilbao
In office 1923–1926
Preceded by	José Maria Vilallonga
Succeeded by	Manuel de la Sota
Vice-president of the Spanish Football Federation
In office 1931–1936
- * Club domestic league appearances and goals

Ricardo Irezábal Goti (30 October 1883 – 29 April 1959) was a Spanish footballer who played as a goalkeeper for Athletic Bilbao in 1908, and later served as the club's president from 1919 until 1921, and again from 1923 until 1926. He was also vice-president of the Spanish Football Federation and delegate of the Basque national team on its tour of America during the Spanish Civil War.

== Early life ==
Ricardo Irezábal was born in the Biscayan town of Bilbao on 30 October 1883, as the son of Isidro Irezábal Beraza and Micaela Goti Ortíz de Zárate. His family owned a successful tile and mosaic business, and his comfortable financial position allowed him to invest all his focus into his love of football.

== Sporting career ==
=== Athletic Bilbao ===
Irezábal began playing football at his hometown club Athletic Bilbao, featuring as a goalkeeper in a friendly match against Stade Bordelais on 19 April 1908, keeping a clean sheet in a 2–0 win. A few years later, in 1916, he appeared on the club's board of directors as treasurer, and then as its accountant in 1918. In 1919, Irezábal was named as the 9th president of Athletic Bilbao (replacing Pedro de Astigarraga), a position that he held for two years, until 1921, when he was replaced by Ernesto Bourgeaud. Two years later, in 1923, he returned to the presidency of the club, and this time he replaced José Maria Vilallonga, grandson of Rafaela Ybarra de Vilallonga, holding the position for three years, until 1926, when he was replaced by Manuel de la Sota. During his first term, the club won the 1921 Copa del Rey, while in the second, the club's crest was changed to include the image of the church of San Antón and the Gernikako Arbola.

Irezabal often expressed his ideas about football in local newspapers; for instance, in 1923, just two months after returning to the presidency of Athletic, he wrote an article in the newspaper Euzkadi in which he strongly advocated against the inevitable advent of professionalism, stating that in England "professionalism and enthusiasm for the amateur game coexist, but each country has its own psychology and for now at least, and surely for a long time, we are not ready for that". On 8 December 1926, Irezábal organized a ceremony in honor of Pichichi, who had died in 1922, in which a bronze bust by the Bilbao sculptor Quintín de la Torre was placed in the Misericordia stands near the San Mamés Stadium, which then held a tribute match between Athletic and its main rival at the time, Arenas, with the former winning 7–2.

=== Later career ===
Irezábal actively participated in the assemblies of the Spanish Football Federation, always advocating for the interests of the Basque clubs, particularly Athletic. He eventually became the RFEF's 3rd vice-president in 1930, and then its 2nd vice-president in 1932, holding this position until the outbreak of the Civil War, during which he and Manuel de la Sota, who was also a former Bilbao president and an active nationalist, served as presidents of the Basque national team that toured Europe and America under the name of Euzkadi. Initially, the team's coach was Pedro Vallana, who later abandoned the expedition in Argentina, being replaced by Irezábal, who led the team in Mexico in 1937. When this team was dissolved, Irezábal signed up for Mexican football, using his experience to draft the statutes of the Mexican Football Federation and eventually becoming president of the Mexican Football Competition Committee.

== Personal life ==
Irezábal married Rosa Benguria, and the couple had five children, Mercedes (1915–1988), Rosa, Pilar, Ricardo, and Alberto Irezábal y Benguría, who played football for CD Getxo in the 1934–35 season. His son Ricardo went on to replace Vicente Calderón as the president of Atlético Madrid, where he did not apply the philosophy that his father had advocated at Bilbao.

== Death ==
Irezábal died in Mexico City on 29 April 1959, at the age of 75.
