= Juan Elorduy =

Spanish footballer

Personal information
- Full name: Juan Manuel Elorduy Saracibar
- Date of birth: 21 December 1888
- Place of birth: Bilbao, Biscay, Spain
- Date of death: 12 November 1977 (aged 88)
- Place of death: Unknown
- Position: Midfielder

Senior career*
Years	Team	Apps	(Gls)
1910–1913	Athletic Club		
- * Club domestic league appearances and goals

Juan Manuel Elorduy Saracibar (21 December 1888 – 12 November 1977) was a Spanish footballer who played as a midfielder for Athletic Bilbao.

== Biography ==
In 1909, Juan Elorduy, then a Mining Engineering student and a rich heir, was going to spend the Christmas of 1909 in London, and taking advantage of this trip, the then president of Athletic Bilbao Alberto Zarraoa commissioned him to purchase 25 shirts for the team. The ones the players had, donated at the time by Juan Moser, were beginning to be worn out from so much sweat and washing, and the locker room had to be renewed. Elorduy had the firm intention of fulfilling the order, but he failed to do so because there were not enough left in the store and he could not find such a large number of harlequinade zamarras. It was when he was waiting in the port city of Southampton for the ship back to Bilbao and empty-handed, that Elorduy realized that the colours of the local team, which instead of being blue and white were red and white stripes, matched the colours of the City of Bilbao, and bought 50 shirts to take with him. It is not known what the reaction of the Athletic board chaired by Zarraoa was when they saw the shipment of shirts, but what is known is that, just a few days after Elorduy's return, Athletic wore new clothing in Irun on 9 January 1910 and stayed with it forever. Of the 50 shirts bought by Elorduy, half of them stayed at his grandparents' house, and it was after Athletic's tribute dinner to its Madrid branch, Atlético Madrid, on 1 January 1911, that he was approached by Manuel Rodríguez Arzuaga, the patron of Atlético, who asked him to bring them from his home in Bilbao to Madrid, stating "When you return to Madrid after Epiphany, you can bring them with you, I will pay for them all". However, one source states that it was in a match between both Athletics, that the Madrid residents fell in love with the new shirt and adopted it.

The origin of the red and white Athletic Club shirts has been the subject of numerous debates throughout the history of the club, and recent studies carried out by Basque sports researchers and historians have questioned this story and come up with a much more logic and well-thought-out new theory, which states that during a friendly match between Athletic Club and San Sebastian in November 1909, to mark the opening of their new stadium, Athletic's goalkeeper Crawford complained about both sides sharing the same colours, and following a month-long debate over which team should change their colours, it was Athletic who did it, with Juan Arzuaga and William Dyer, the latter born in Sunderland, making it known that Sunderland AFC had a kit with white and red vertical stripes, and Arzuaga then contacted a friend of his in Sunderland who could purchase some of those shirts from Henry A. Murton's Shop.

Elorduy only made his debut for Athletic Club on 9 April 1911, in a preliminary round of the 1911 Copa del Rey against Fortuna Vigo, helping his side to a 2–0 win. He did not play a competitive match for Athletic ever again, but by playing in this match, Elorduy was part of the squad that then won the 1911 Cup title.

== Honours ==
Athletic Club

- Copa del Rey:
  - Winners (1): 1911
