= Benguria =

Benguria or Benguría is a Spanish surname. Notable people with the surname include:

- Carmina Benguría (1920–2017), Cuban poet and reciter
- José María Benguria (1904–?), Spanish footballer
- Rafael Benguria (born 1951), Chilean physicist-mathematician
- Ricardo Irezábal Benguría (1910–1987), Spanish commercial manager and sports leader
- Santos Domínguez y Benguria (1841–1905), Spanish accountant, architect, diplomat, and politician
