= Ucelay =

Ucelay is a Spanish surname. Notable people with the surname include:

- Ángel González Ucelay (born 1965), Spanish sports journalist
- Enric Ucelay-Da Cal (born 1948), American historian specializing in contemporary history
- José María Ucelay (1903–1979), Spanish painter, illustrator, and decorator
- Margarita Ucelay (1916–2014), Spanish philologist
- Matilde Ucelay (1912–2008), the first woman licensed in architecture in Spain
- Víctor Escribano Ucelay (1913–1986), Spanish municipal architect
