= Alberto Zarraoa =

Spanish footballer

5th President of Athletic Bilbao
- In office 1908–1910
- Preceded by: Ramón de Aras Jáuregui
- Succeeded by: Pedro de Astigarraga

Personal details
- Born: Alberto Zarraoa Gazaga; 18 February 1882 Bilbao, Biscay, Spain
- Died: 4 October 1953 (aged 71) Bilbao, Biscay, Spain

Alberto Ysaias Zarraoa Gazaga (18 February 1882 – 4 October 1953) was a Spanish footballer who served as the 5th president of Athletic Bilbao between 1908 and 1910. Under his presidency, the club not only won a Copa del Rey title in 1910, there were two notable events: a merger between Athletic and San Sebastián was aborted and the club began wearing the red and white shirt.

== Sporting career ==
=== Founding Athletic de Madrid ===
On 26 April 1903, Zarraoa was a member of the group led by Eduardo de Acha that met the representatives of Athletic Club, who had just won the 1903 Copa del Rey final, to request permission to create the club's Madrid branch, Athletic Madrid, an idea that was very well received, and thus that club was born. He appeared on the club's first board of directors as a vocal alongside the likes of Juan Murga, Adolfo Astoreca, and Darío Arana under the presidency of Enrique Allende.

=== Presidency of Athletic Bilbao ===
In 1908, Zarraoa was elected as the 5th president of Athletic Bilbao, a position that he held for two years until 1910, when he was replaced by Pedro de Astigarraga. He took the helm of the club during a period in which it was going through low times since it had been surpassed by the apparent consistency of Club Bizcaya, but under his presidency, the once indisputable Athletic Club returned at the end of 1908 to recover the local scepter, becoming the maximum representative in football matters. The Bilbao board of directors, aware of the critical situation that the club has gone through in recent times, promotes football in college centers by encouraging the kids to practice with the most outstanding players of tomorrow, revitalizing their weak youth academy and the same It happens with the University of Deusto, an institution that promotes football to recover part of the clubs that left it just a few years ago. The club then won Copa del Rey title in 1910, beating Real Sociedad (which played under the umbrella of Vasconia) by 1–0 thanks to a goal from Remigio Iza.

In 1909, Zarraoa commissioned his player Juan Elorduy, taking advantage of the fact that he was going to make a trip to England, to purchase fifty shirts for the team and its Madrid branch, a task that he failed to complete because he could not find such a large number of harlequinade zamarras. It was in the port city of Southampton, where he was leaving, where he found shirts from the city's football team, which instead of being blue and white were red and white stripes, a kit that the Bilbao club would begin using on 9 January 1910 and a year later, on 22 January 1911, the Madrid club.

== Death ==
Zarraoa died in Bilbao on 4 October 1953, at the age of 67.
