= Manuel Rodríguez Arzuaga =

Spanish versatile athlete and football executive

1st Honorary President of Hispania AC
- In office 1900–1903
- Born: Manuel Rodríguez Arzuaga; 1876; Laciana, Province of León, Spain
- Died: 5 September 1952 (aged 75–76); Laciana, Province of León, Spain
- Citizenship: Spanish
- Occupations: Versatile athlete; Football executive
- Known for: Founder of Copa Rodríguez Arzuaga

Manuel Rodríguez Arzuaga (1876 – 5 September 1952) was a Spanish versatile athlete and a football executive. He is widely regarded as one of the most important figures in the amateur beginnings of Atlético Madrid since he was one of its founders in 1903, a vice president between 1903 and 1905, and the club's first-ever patron. He invested most of his own capital in Atlético, saving the club from bankruptcy during its moments of financial difficulties. His high economic position was fundamental in helping Atlético to build the Campo de O'Donnell in 1913. He was also credited with the payment for Atlético's first red-and-white shirts in 1911, and the club's first-ever match outside of Madrid in Alicante was promoted and financed by him. He was named an honorary president of the club in 1916.

In 1903, he founded a foot race competition in Madrid, which became the most important event in Madrid athletics, and in 1910, he founded a football competition in the same city. In both cases, he donated a trophy to the winner, the so-called Copa Rodríguez Arzuaga, hence the name of both competitions. He also held the position of director of the Spanish Football Federation.

He was an all-round and versatile athlete, playing both football and field hockey for Atlético when necessary, running foot races, and even coaching tennis. He also played rugby in France and football and rowing in England.

== Early and personal life ==
Manuel Rodríguez Arzuaga was born in 1876 in Laciana, as the son of Manuel Rodríguez y Rodriguez and Catalina Arzuaga y Garmendia. He was one of a total of eleven siblings (7 men and 4 women) who were involved in several businesses and linked to many companies that were emblematic in the Province of León and outside of it, such as Tapicerías Rodríguez Hermanos and, later, in Madrid, the popular Almacenes Rodríguez on Gran Vía, which were inaugurated by King Alfonso XIII.

During his youth, Rodríguez Arzuaga traveled a lot, and in one of his trips, to London, he discovered the game of football and developed a deep interest in it. It is said that he was the one who brought the first ball to Madrid. He also practiced rowing in England and played rugby in France. He was a student at the Institución Libre de Enseñanza.

He never married.

== Sporting career ==
=== Founding Athletic de Madrid ===
On 26 April 1903, Rodríguez Arzuaga was a member of the group led by Eduardo de Acha that met the representatives of Athletic Club, who had just won the 1903 Copa del Rey final, to request permission to create the club's Madrid branch, Athletic Madrid, an idea that was very well received, and thus that club was born. He appeared on the club's second board of directors in 1903 as the vice president (replacing Juan de Zabala) under the presidency of Eduardo de Acha, a position that he held for two years until 1905.

=== Foot races ===
In 1903, the same year that the football team was founded, the Athletic Club of Madrid launched its athletics section. Rodríguez Arzuaga was an athletic partner, and in 1903, he organized a foot race through the streets of Madrid, which was won by the Swiss Charles Robert Ruesch, followed by four teammates, all of them members of the Athletic Club of Madrid, which was proclaimed champion of the tournament. He donated a trophy valued at 500 pesetas to the winner, the so-called Copa Rodríguez Arzuaga, so the competition was named as such. Athletic and the local newspaper Heraldo de Madrid continued organizing it while Rodríguez Arzuaga continued to donate the trophy.

Athletic continued to compete for the Copa Rodríguez Arzuaga, the main athletics tournament in Madrid of the time, with its most notable opponent being Sociedad Gimnástica, which won it in 1904. On 22 April 1905, on the verge of the club's second anniversary, Athletic's Ruesch won another race, ahead of José Nogues (Gimnástica) and Jerónimo López (Athletic). Athletics continued to mark an era in Madrid life and in that of Athletic, who organized other prestigious tournaments such as the Madrid Olympic Games in 1914, where Garnica (discus) Alberto Vivanco (hammer), and Linnae (ball) led their respective disciplines and the first two even broke national records.

In addition to football and athletics, the club also had a tennis section in its first years. In 1907, Antonio Vega de Seoane was the first captain of the tennis section, and Fernando de Asuero was the second captain, while Rodríguez Arzuaga simply worked as a tennis coach.

=== Patron of Athletic de Madrid ===
Rodríguez Arzuaga then dedicated most of his youthful efforts to Atlético as he invested most of his time and energy in the club, and most importantly, his money as well. A true colchonero, he put financial resources from his own pocket at the disposal of the club when its disappearance loomed due to bankruptcy and major financial problems. He is thus considered one of the saviors of Atlético de Madrid, the other being Francisco Vives.

On 8 November 1907, Rodríguez Arzuaga started in a friendly match against Club Español de Madrid, scoring the opening goal in an eventual 2–0 victory.

In the spring of 1909, a team from Alicante invited Atlético to play a match there, offering them 250 pesetas to pay for the trip. The amount was clearly insufficient, so the players who could, had to pay for their tickets, and those who could not, were invited by Rodríguez Arzuaga, who covered the rest of the expenses, thus playing a crucial role in helping Atlético make this excursion to play away from Madrid for the first time in their history.

In 1910, he founded the Copa Rodríguez Arzuaga, a friendly football competition contested by clubs from Madrid that was named in honor of the donator of the trophy, Rodríguez Arzuaga, who did so to create greater motivation. He paid for the expenses, trips, referee fee, the trophies, and soon the kits too, because, in January 1911, he approached Juan Elorduy regarding the red and white shirts that he had brought from Southampton to Athletic Bilbao, so that he would bring them from his home in Bilbao to Madrid, stating "When you return to Madrid after Epiphany, you can bring them with you, I will pay for them all". Atlético played its first game as a red and white team in the second edition of the Copa Rodríguez Arzuaga against Sociedad Gimnástica on 22 January 1911, which ended in the latter side withdrawing. Atlético only won one Rodríguez Arzuaga cup, in 1914.

His high economic position was fundamental in helping Atlético to build the Campo de O'Donnell in 1913. The construction began at the end of 1912, and the project was carried out only thanks to the financial contribution of Rodríguez Arzuaga, patron of the club, who put up 30,000 pesetas (which at the time represented a fortune) to prepare the land and pay for the 600 linear meters of wood used in the fenced.

In 1916, and at the request of the then president Julián Ruete, it was unanimously accepted to appoint Manuel Rodríguez Arzuaga as honorary president, in recognition of his essential help to the club in several very delicate moments in its history. Finally, on 25 October 1930, a group of 50 venerable "colchoneros" gathered together and decided to create a club that they would call "The 50", of which Rodríguez Arzuaga would be its first partner.

== Other activities ==
On 11 November 1909, Rodríguez Arzuaga appeared on the first board of directors of the Spanish Football Federation, being elected as a member alongside the likes of Narciso Masferrer and Joan Gamper, under the presidency of Pedro Neyra.

Rodríguez Arzuaga organized the summer camps of the School Institute in San Vicente de la Barquera and in 1912, he financed the construction of the shelter house of the Free Education Institution, in the Sierra de Guadarrama.

On 29 April 1917, he was the referee of the second replay of a Copa del Rey semifinal tie between Madrid FC and FC Espanya, which ended in a 1–0 victory in favour of his hometown club thanks to a second-half penalty that he awarded to Madrid.

== Legacy ==
Rodríguez Arzuaga is remembered among the whitewashed walls of their family home in San Miguel de Laciana. His great-great-grandson Jorge de Orueta, would become an ambassador of Spain in Cameroon.
