= Mikel Dañobeitia =

Spanish footballer

Personal information
- Full name: Mikel Dañobeitia Martín
- Date of birth: 5 March 1986 (age 40)
- Place of birth: Barakaldo, Spain
- Height: 1.79 m (5 ft 10 1/2 in)
- Position: Winger

Youth career
- 1995–1996: Danok Bat
- 1996–2000: Athletic Bilbao
- 2000–2002: Danok Bat
- 2002–2004: Athletic Bilbao

Senior career*
Years	Team	Apps	(Gls)
2004	Basconia	13	(3)
2005	→ Sestao (loan)	20	(2)
2005	Bilbao Athletic	11	(5)
2005–2007	Athletic Bilbao	26	(1)
2007–2009	Salamanca	61	(5)
2009–2011	Córdoba	24	(1)
2011–2012	Logroñés	23	(0)
2013–2014	Barakaldo	17	(1)
2015–2016	Portugalete	10	(0)
2016	Balmaseda	1	(0)
Total		206	(18)
- * Club domestic league appearances and goals

Mikel Dañobeitia Martín (born 5 March 1986) is a Spanish former professional footballer who played mainly as a right winger.

== Club career ==
An Athletic Bilbao youth graduate, Dañobeitia was born in Barakaldo, Basque Country, and served some loans (including at its farm team, CD Basconia) before being promoted to the main squad for the 2005–06 season. He made his La Liga debut on 26 October 2005, playing 70 minutes in a 3–2 away loss against CA Osasuna. He scored his only goal on 17 December that, helping the hosts to beat Real Betis 2–0.

Following a relatively successful first year, Dañobeitia only appeared in six matches in his second, being released and joining UD Salamanca of Segunda División. In the 2008–09 campaign, he reunited with former Athletic youth teammate Gorka Azkorra.

Dañobeitia moved to another club at that level on 9 July 2009, Córdoba CF. After just seven games in his second season, under Lucas Alcaraz, he left the Andalusians and signed for UD Logroñés in the Segunda División B.
