= Ramón Aras =

Spanish footballer (1881–1966)

4th President of Athletic Bilbao
- In office 1906–1908
- Preceded by: Enrique Careaga
- Succeeded by: Alberto Zarraoa

Personal details
- Born: Ramón de Aras Jáuregui; 1881 Bilbao, Spain
- Died: 1966 (aged 84-85) San Sebastián, Basque Country, Spain

Ramón de Aras Jáuregui (1881 – 1966) was a Spanish politician who was one of the most important figures in the Basque society in the first quarter of the 20th century. He was a city councilor from 1913 to 1917 and was a patron of several painters of the time, such as Darío de Regoyos. Like so many other Basque fortunes of his time, he dedicated large sums of money to creating a vast and valued art collection, being one of the most noted and important collections in Bilbao.

He was an honorary member and treasurer of the Athletic Club (partly financed by his own pocket) and served as the club's 4th president of Athletic Bilbao between 1906 and 1908. Under his presidency, the club merged with Unión Vizcaino to form Bizcaya, which was specially created to take part in the 1907 Copa del Rey, endured internal problems, and suffered a drought of titles.

== Football career ==
=== Bilbao FC ===
Born in Bilbao, Aras began to play football games in the Hippodrome of Lamiako, which at the time was the home of organized football in Biscay.

In the late 1890s, Aras became a member of an informal group led by Carlos Castellanos, the so-called Bilbao Football Club, the first entity to play football in Bilbao since the disappearance of Club Atleta. Although it was formed in 1896, it was not until 30 November 1900 that the club was officially established in a meeting held in the house of industrialist José Luis de Villabaso (1852–1917) in the Biscayan neighborhood of Algorta. The founding date of the new Bilbao FC (the feast of Andrew the Apostle) can be coincidental or interpreted in a Basque nationalist key since Jáuregui was a prominent nationalist. The entity's board was subsequently elected, with Castellanos being ratified as president and Aras as treasurer. Jáuregui never played a match for the club, official or otherwise.

Due to financial exhaustion and a loss of interest in football, the owners of Bilbao FC agreed at the General Meeting on 29 March 1903 to dissolve the club, and its remaining members and associates were officially absorbed by Athletic Club, including Aras, who was named an honorary member and treasurer of the Athletic Club, which was partly financed by his own pocket.

== Presidency of Athletic Bilbao ==
Between 1904 and 1905, Athletic barely played matches due to a lack of significant rivals in its territory, which caused a sporting crisis. In 1906, Jáuregui was elected as the 4th president of Athletic Bilbao, a position that he held for two years until 1908, when he was replaced by Alberto Zarraoa. Under his presidency, the club reached the final of the 1906 Copa del Rey, which Athletic lost 1–4 to Madrid FC.

Embarrassed by this result, Aras decided to open negotiations with the president of the second most important club in Bilbao, Alberto Zárraga of Unión Vizcaino, to join the best players of each club to form a team known as Bizcaya, which was specially created to take part in the 1907 Copa del Rey. They thus held several meetings between the first teams of each club in order to make a selection and "reactivate" the Club Bizcaya team that had been used in 1902 for the Copa de la Coronación, but not under the format of an occasional team as was done in 1902, but under the legal umbrella of a company with Statutes and a conventional board that could participate in the Copa del Rey. This plan seemed to work as Bizcaya and Madrid FC finished level on points, meaning that a play-off had to be played on 30 March, but Bizcaya lost 0–1 courtesy of a late goal from Manuel Prast. During his two years at the office of the club, he failed to win a single title, becoming the first president to do so since Luis Márquez, who did not compete in any competition.

== Politic career ==
In politics, Aras was a Basque nationalist and was a councilor in the city of Bilbao from 1913 to 1917, including under the mandate of city mayor Mario Arana, who had also been an Athletic football player in his youth.

== Collection ==
Although many of the newly Basque enriched of his time spent their fortunes decorating the interiors of their mansions, the case of Aras was different, as he dedicated large sums of money to creating a vast art collection, which was during a good part of the 20th century one of the most noted collections in Bilbao. He was committed to making his collection accessible to the public in the city, proof of this are the Museum's catalogs during the first three decades of the century, which include ceded or donated works that went from a selection of Flemish tapestries, ivories, and reliquaries to paintings. The magnitude of the original collection was such that simply by comparing that of the museum itself, which opened its doors in 1914, it had 137 works, while he would easily multiply that number several times. A good number of these works are part of the current Bilbao Fine Arts Museum.

Aras also was one of his sponsors as well as a judge in artistic competitions.

During the conflict of the Spanish Civil War and the Bombing of Guernica, the safeguarding of the cultural heritage was made a priority objective, and the collection of Aras was obviously included. A good part of his works were transferred to the Bilbao Museum to avoid their destruction. For fear of the bombings, part of the funds was taken from the institution and transferred to Paris. The lack of control with which it was carried out, added to the vicissitudes of the war itself, caused a good part of the funds that were treasured to be lost. An example of this is seen in images from 1936 and 1937 in which the paintings and frames that were separated from the paintings are stacked in order to facilitate their transfer and therefore damaging their state of conservation.

After the war his weight in the city of Bilbao lost strength as well as the volume of the collection, part lost and another donated to his own people.

== Death ==
Aras died in San Sebastián in 1966, at the age of either 84 or 85, without any mention in the press despite having been one of the great men of Basque society.
