= Ibón Gutiérrez =

Spanish footballer

Personal information
- Full name: Ibón Gutiérrez Fernández
- Date of birth: 10 July 1984 (age 42)
- Place of birth: Bilbao, Spain
- Height: 1.75 m (5 ft 9 in)
- Position: Defensive midfielder

Youth career
- 1996–1997: Danok Bat
- 1997–2002: Athletic Bilbao

Senior career*
Years	Team	Apps	(Gls)
2002–2003	Basconia	36	(0)
2003–2005	Bilbao Athletic	62	(2)
2005–2006	Athletic Bilbao	6	(0)
2006	→ Numancia (loan)	10	(0)
2006–2008	Castellón	38	(0)
2008–2009	Albacete	20	(0)
2009–2010	Alicante	30	(1)
2010–2011	Alavés	21	(0)
2011–2013	Sestao	42	(0)
2013–2015	Sant Andreu	70	(2)
2015–2016	Badalona	25	(0)
2016–2017	Palencia	30	(1)
2018–2019	San Pedro	27	(0)
Total		417	(6)
- * Club domestic league appearances and goals

Ibón Gutiérrez Fernández (born 10 July 1984) is a Spanish former professional footballer who played as a defensive midfielder.

== Club career ==
Gutiérrez was born in Bilbao, Biscay. A product of Athletic Bilbao's prolific youth ranks, he appeared in six first-team matches during 2005–06 (five complete), the first coming on 27 August 2005 in a 3–0 home win against neighbours Real Sociedad. However, he finished the campaign in the Segunda División, loaned to CD Numancia.

Subsequently, Gutiérrez played two seasons in the same level, appearing regularly for CD Castellón after which he left for another club in that tier, Albacete Balompié. In the summer of 2009 he dropped down to Segunda División B, joining recently-relegated Alicante CF, and continued to compete there the following years in representation of a hosts of teams.
