= José María Ucelay =

Spanish painter, illustrator, and decorator

- Born: José Mari Uzelai Uriarte; 1 November 1903; Bermeo, Biscay, Spain
- Died: 24 December 1979 (aged 76); Busturia, Spain
- Citizenship: Spanish
- Occupations: Painter; Illustrator; Decorator

José Mari Uzelai Uriarte, better known as José María Ucelay (1 November 1903 – 24 December 1979), was a Spanish painter, illustrator, and decorator.

== Early life and education ==
Born in Bermeo on 1 November 1903, Ucelay moved with his family to Bilbao, where he received his education from 1909 onwards. Due to family pressure, he studied law, Philosophy, and Literature in Deusto (1920–21), and then Chemistry in Oviedo (1921–22), but he ended up abandoning both to devote himself to painting.

== Painting career ==
=== Traveling around Europe ===
He soon came into contact with the Association of Basque Artists, with whom he exhibited in 1921. He took part in the exhibition activities of that entity, holding his first individual shows there. In 1922 he began studying at the Royal Academy of Fine Arts of San Fernando in Madrid. In the capital he stayed at the Residencia de Estudiantes, took part in various gatherings, and had the opportunity to discover different trends and the main creators of the time. He traveled to Paris in 1922, sharing a studio first with the painter Pancho Cossío, and later with the writer Claudio de la Torre. Also in Paris, he became acquainted with the avant-garde movements, coming into contact with the Spanish people living there, such as Francisco Bores, Manuel Ángeles Ortiz, Hernando Viñes, and Benjamín Palencia.

In 1925, Ucelay participated in the Exhibition of the Society of Iberian Artists, held in Madrid, as well as in the exhibitions organized by the same society in Copenhagen (1932), Berlin (1932–33), and Paris (1936); between 1929 and 1936, he also participated in several editions of the Carnegie Institute competition in Pittsburgh.

=== Golden years ===
During this period, Ucelay created several sets for theatre, and was also the main promoter of the homage to Góngora organized by the Association of Basque Artists in Bilbao (1927). He was a graphic contributor to publications such as Litoral, Horizonte, Revista de Occidente y Norte. In 1933 he created one of his most significant works, the sixteen-metre mural for the batzoki of the Basque Nationalist Party in Bermeo, which he exhibited at the 20th Venice Biennale in 1936.

Ucelay In 1936 he was appointed director of Fine Arts of the Basque Government, and the following year, he served as commissioner of the Basque Pavilion at the 1937 Paris International Exposition.

=== Exile and death ===
Following his exile, and together with his close friend Eli Gallastegui and the politician Manuel de la Sota, Ucelay was one of the main promoters of the propagandist theater movement, creating the ballet Eresoinka, for which Ucelay designed costumes and stage sets.

In 1938, he settled in Great Britain, where he held several exhibitions and created mural paintings, returning to Spain only in 1949, from which time he alternated between Busturia and Madrid. In 1969 he permanently secluded himself in the old family home in Chirapozu in Busturia, where he continued his creative work (especially portraits) and exhibitions. In the 1960s, he was part of the Emen group of Vizcaya, an attempt to unify the artists of the Basque School. He died there on 24 December 1979, at the age of 76.

== Style ==
Ucelay's compositions were meticulously crafted and brightly coloured, showing a clear predominance of line and drawing. Close to some of the assumptions of magical realism and metaphysical painting, they also show the influence of Japanese art. In the 1930s, the study of colour and atmospheric effects occupied a prominent place in these works, which during his exile, included an iconographic repertoire of marine themes. At the end of his career, Ucelay preferred to work with easel painting, often retouching during this period, with varying success, some of the works from his youth.

His painting, with a personal realism, focuses on the representation of landscapes and characters from his land, carried out with great technical perfection and a characteristic style of stylized forms.
