= Unai Alba =

Spanish footballer

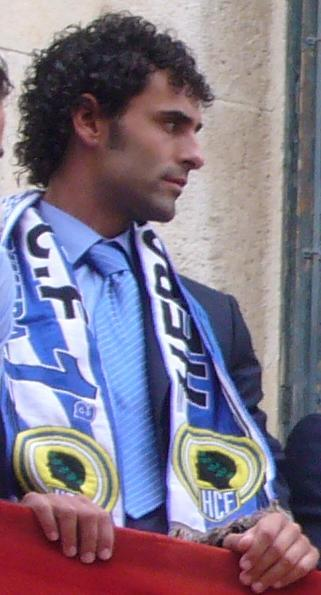
- Alba celebrates La Liga promotion with Hércules in 2010

Personal information
- Full name: Unai Alba Pagadizabal
- Date of birth: 19 February 1978 (age 48)
- Place of birth: Oiartzun, Spain
- Height: 1.90 m (6 ft 3 in)
- Position: Goalkeeper

Senior career*
Years	Team	Apps	(Gls)
1998–1999	Eibar B		
1999–2001	Real Unión	22	(0)
2001–2002	Zestoa		
2002–2004	Lagun Onak		
2004–2006	Barakaldo	85	(0)
2007	Athletic Bilbao	0	(0)
2007–2011	Hércules	37	(0)
2011–2012	Orihuela	27	(0)
2012–2013	Alcoyano	40	(0)
2014	Ontinyent	13	(0)
Total		224	(0)

International career
2007	Basque Country	1	(0)
- * Club domestic league appearances and goals

Unai Alba Pagadizabal (born 19 February 1978 in Oiartzun, Gipuzkoa, Basque Country) is a Spanish former professional footballer who played as a goalkeeper.

== Career statistics ==
Appearances and goals by club, season and competition
Club	Season	League			National cup		Other		Total	
Club	Season	Division	Apps	Goals	Apps	Goals	Apps	Goals	Apps	Goals
Real Unión	1999–2000	Segunda División B	10	0	3	0	—		13	0
Real Unión	2000–01	Segunda División B	12	0	—		—		12	0
Real Unión	Total		22	0	3	0	—		25	0
Barakaldo	2004–05	Segunda División B	30	0	—		—		30	0
Barakaldo	2005–06	Segunda División B	38	0	2	0	—		40	0
Barakaldo	2006–07	Segunda División B	17	0	—		—		17	0
Barakaldo	Total		85	0	2	0	—		87	0
Athletic Bilbao	2006–07	La Liga	0	0	—		—		0	0
Hércules	2007–08	Segunda División	33	0	3	0	—		36	0
Hércules	2008–09	Segunda División	2	0	4	0	—		6	0
Hércules	2009–10	Segunda División	0	0	6	0	—		6	0
Hércules	2010–11	La Liga	2	0	0	0	—		2	0
Hércules	Total		37	0	13	0	—		50	0
Orihuela	2011–12	Segunda División B	27	0	0	0	2	0	29	0
Alcoyano	2012–13	Segunda División B	40	0	3	0	2	0	45	0
Ontinyent	2013–14	Segunda División B	13	0	—		—		13	0
Career total			224	0	21	0	4	0	249	0
