= Manuel de la Sota =

Spanish promoter of Basque culture, writer, and sports leader

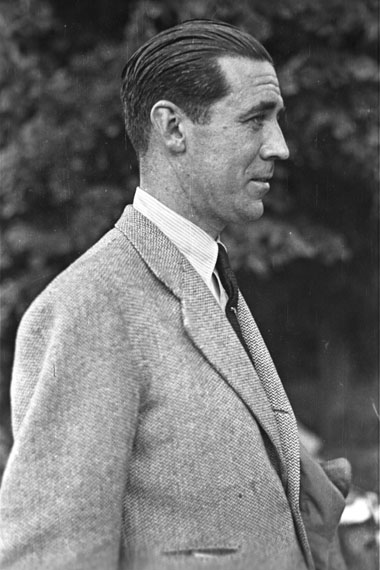
- Manuel de la Sota
- Born: Manuel de la Sota Aburto; 27 July 1897; Las Arenas, Basque Country, Spain
- Died: 29 December 1979 (aged 82); Bilbao, Spain
- Citizenship: Spanish
- Occupations: Athlete; Sports leader

11th president of Athletic Bilbao
- In office 1926–1929
- Preceded by: Ricardo de Irezabal
- Succeeded by: Manuel Castellanos

Manuel de la Sota Aburto, also known as Manu Sota (27 July 1897 – 29 December 1979), was a Basque Spanish promoter of Basque culture, a writer, and a nationalist politician. He was a cultural promoter, delegate of the Basque Government in exile, academic of Euskaltzaindia, but he is best known for being the 11th president of Athletic Bilbao.

His cousin Alejandro de la Sota was also a president of Athletic Bilbao, and as Basque nationalists, both of them strengthened the philosophy known as cantera within the club, which resounded over the idea of not using foreigners, only Basques, hence creating the club's infamous signing policy.

== Early life and education ==
Manuel de la Sota was born on 27 July 1897 in Las Arenas, as the son of businessman and ruling politician Ramon de la Sota and Catalina Trinidad de Aburto y Uribe.

The de la Sota family, which had significant assets in Altos Hornos, the largest company in Spain for much of the 20th century, was the richest family on the entire coast of the Bay of Biscay. Being the son of a well-off family, de la Sota studied law at the University of Salamanca and Cambridge, teaching several years at the latter University.

When he returned to Biscay, de la Sota became active in Basque nationalism, and when the division of Basque nationalism occurred in 1921, he did not hesitate to stay in the pro-independence faction, Aberri's Basque Nationalist Party (EAJ). In fact, de la Sotas were economic supporters of what would become the EAJ. His older brother, also named Ramon (1887–1978), also became a nationalist politician.

== Professional career ==
Together with his close friend Eli Gallastegui and the painter José María Ucelay, de la Sota was one of the main promoters of the propagandist theater movement. Under his direction, his works or adaptations by various authors were performed, such as Libe from Sabino Arana and Pedro Mari from Arturo Campión. Even though he wrote most of his works in Spanish, he had them translated into Basque and published them. He published most of his works in the magazines Pyrenaica, Euzkadi, and Euzkerea, becoming a director of the former between 1928 and 1930.

As for his production in Basque, he carried it out with the help of his teacher of the Basque language, the poet "Lauaxeta", or were simply translated by José de Altuna or by Paul Guilsou, which was the case with Bihotz apala. On the other hand, he also worked extensively on the Diccionario Retana de Autoridades de la Lengua Basque (Retana Dictionary of Basque Language Authorities).

His friendship with Gallastegui rendered Sota to follow him in his nationalist orientation that promoted the Mendigoizale movement, despite which he always collaborated with José Antonio de Aguirre, a future Lendakari. Despite being a pro-independence, de la Sota did not ignore the important literary movement that was developing in the rest of the country at that time, the so-called generation of '27, and his collaborations, along with those of Ucelay, can be seen in the Revista de Occidente, La Gaceta Literaria, Litoral, Et cetera. He then established his pseudonym Txanka in the Basque press.

== Gastronomic career ==
Between 16 and 23 February 1928, de la Sota published in the Excelsior, which was owned by his family, a delicious gastronomic epistolary that, in seven installments and dedicated to the then director of the newspaper Jacinto Miquelarena, served him to present his personal theses about food, drink and good living. In his articles, he displayed a cosmopolitan and refined taste with nods to local products or recipes and, despite having studied in England, throughout his seven chapters he revealed to have a rather Francophile palate.

Aside from a brief initial discussion about whether to say mahonesa or mayonesa, the text begins by revealing that his true interest was not in the plates but in the glasses, writing extensively about wine; when to drink it, at what temperature and even how to appreciate it.

== Sporting career ==
In 1926, de la Sota was appointed as the 11th president of Athletic Bilbao (replacing Ricardo de Irezabal), a position that he held for three years until 1929, when he was replaced by Manuel Castellanos. During his mandate, the club did not win anything of significance, but he successfully led the club towards the new times of professional football in Spain and the foundation of the national league.

His status as president of Athletic Bilbao, earned him the appointment of a member of Sports in 1932 on the Permanent Board of the Society of Basque Studies, a position in which he remained until 1936. In addition to football, de la Sota also loved mountaineering, which highlights his attachment to modernist ideas and aesthetics.

In 1937, de la Sota went into exile and began to develop intense propaganda work, participating in different propaganda missions promoted by the Basque Government during the tour of the Basque Country national football team around the world that began in April. In the tour of the Eresoinka group since December, being the author of the composition and plot of the Akerlanda painting.

== Later life ==
Before the Spanish Civil War, de la Sota was a great supporter of the theater, and during the war, he moved to Miarritza. In 1940, de la Sota was part of the delegation of the Basque Government in New York City, where he collaborated until 1946 when, after the Second World War, he returned to his home in Biarritz. The fruit of his stay in his Yankee outfit were unimportant conversations about the inhabitants of the new Anglo-Saxon world.

In Laburdi, where de la Sota lived with his brother Ramón until his death, he dedicated himself fully to Basque studies. He was one of the organizers of the Biarritz Congress of Basque Studies (1948). He was also named academic of the rebuilt post-war Euskaltzaindia. He established an important library that he later donated, along with many other objects (engravings, etchings, drawings, maps) to the Basque Museum in Bayonne.

== Death ==
De la Sota died in Bilbao at the house of his nephew Patrick, in the town where he was born, on 29 December 1979, at the age of 82.

Beginning in 1919, the Sota family donated several paintings to the Bilbao Fine Arts Museum. In 1979, Manuel bequeathed a splendid screen by José María Ucelay dating from 1935. In 2008, Bilbao Fine Arts Museum purchased a painting called "Artists’ Night, Ibaigane" from the Sota heirs, which had been painted for Manuel by Antonio de Guezala.

== Works ==
- Ixaro-Ixarra (1930)
- Oztin (1932)
- Negarrez igaro zan atsua (The old woman cried). Based on a legend by the poet W. B. Yeats (1933, Verdes Atxirika)
- Iru gudari (1933)
- Libe (1934, the theater work started by Sabino Arana and finished by Sota)
- Los caudillos. Patrick Pearse's play "The Singer" was adapted to the Basque atmosphere and translated into Basque by Joseba Altuna.
- Gosemin eta azken ordua (Gosemin and the Last Hour) (1934)
- Urretxindorra. Gastetxubentzako antzeztija, atal bakarduna - Iturralde eta Suit (1934, Verdes Atxirika)
- Buruzagyak. Atal bateko antzerkya (The leaders. A play in one act) (1935, Verdes Atxirika)

Joseba Altuna translated into Basque most of these theater works by Manu Sota. He also cultivated poetry with pieces such as Tis-tas eta din-dan or Mitxeleta abeslariak.

== Bibliography ==
- Altuna Gabiola, Ander (2011). Joseba Altuna Aldasoro "Amilgain": 1887-1971 Bizitzako zertzeladak [Joseba Altuna Aldasoro "Amilgain": 1887-1971 Stories of life]. Bilbao: Servico Central de Publications del Gobierno Vasco. ISBN 978-84-457-3166-6.
