= Gorka Azkorra =

Spanish footballer

Personal information
- Full name: Gorka Azkorra Trueba
- Date of birth: 25 January 1983 (age 43)
- Place of birth: Bilbao, Spain
- Height: 1.92 m (6 ft 3 1/2 in)
- Position: Centre-forward

Youth career
- 1995–1996: Romo
- 1996–2001: Athletic Bilbao

Senior career*
Years	Team	Apps	(Gls)
2001–2002	Basconia	34	(16)
2002–2004	Bilbao Athletic	68	(30)
2004–2005	Athletic Bilbao	5	(0)
2005	→ Recreativo (loan)	18	(3)
2005–2006	Numancia	26	(0)
2006–2008	Albacete	43	(5)
2008–2010	Salamanca	39	(3)
2010–2011	Lugo	35	(18)
2011–2012	Alavés	26	(5)
2012–2013	Guadalajara	35	(8)
2013–2014	Hércules	17	(2)
2014–2015	Gimnàstic	24	(3)
2015–2016	Murcia	25	(7)
2016–2017	Sestao	20	(2)
2017–2018	Zamudio	6	(7)
Total		421	(109)

International career
2001	Spain U19	2	(0)

Managerial career
- 2022–2023: Goa (assistant)
- * Club domestic league appearances and goals

Gorka Azkorra Trueba (born 25 January 1983) is a Spanish former professional footballer who played as a centre-forward.

He appeared in 178 matches in the Segunda División over eight seasons and scored 21 goals, representing mainly in the competition Albacete and Salamanca (two years apiece). In La Liga, he played for Athletic Bilbao.

== Playing career ==
Born in Bilbao, Basque Country, Azkorra emerged through local giants Athletic Bilbao's youth system, but could only make eight appearances with the main squad – all in the 2004–05 season – after scoring prolifically for the club's B and feeder teams. He made his La Liga debut on 3 October 2004, playing 25 minutes in a 3–1 away loss against Getafe CF; to five top-flight matches, he added three in the UEFA Cup.

In the 2005 January transfer window, Azkorra moved to the Segunda División, where he went on to represent Recreativo de Huelva (on loan), CD Numancia, Albacete Balompié and UD Salamanca. Whilst with the latter side, in the 2008–09 campaign, he reunited with his former Athletic youth teammate Mikel Dañobeitia.

Azkorra continued competing in the second and third tiers the following years, with CD Lugo (scoring a career-best 18 goals in the 2010–11 campaign), Deportivo Alavés, CD Guadalajara, Hércules CF, Gimnàstic de Tarragona, Real Murcia CF and Sestao River Club. He retired aged 35 following an amateur spell at Zamudio SD.

== Coaching career ==
In June 2022, Azkorra was appointed assistant coach at Indian Super League team FC Goa under his compatriot Carlos Peña. Before and after that, he worked with Athletic Bilbao's youths.
