= Ricardo de Irezábal =

Spanish commercial manager and sports leader

22nd President of Atlético Madrid
- In office 16 June 1980 – 31 July 1980
- Preceded by: Vicente Calderón
- Succeeded by: Alfonso Cabeza

Personal details
- Born: Ricardo de Irezábal y Benguría; 14 June 1910; Bilbao, Biscay, Spain
- Died: 14 June 1987 (aged 77); Madrid, Spain

Ricardo de Irezábal y Benguría (14 June 1910 – 14 June 1987) was a Spanish commercial manager and sports leader, who served as the 22nd president of Atlético Madrid for one month in 1980.

== Early life ==
Ricardo de Irezábal was born in the Biscayan town of Bilbao on 14 June 1910, as the son of Rosa Benguria and Ricardo Irezábal, who presided over Athletic Bilbao from 1919 until 1921, and again from 1923 until 1926. He began his football career at CD Getxo, and likewise, his brother Alberto Irezábal y Benguría also played for Getxo in the 1934–35 season.

During the Spanish Civil War, the Irezábal family went into exile in Mexico, where his father had traveled with the Basque national team on its tour of Europe and America. He entered in Mexico through the port of Veracruz on 18 September 1939.

== Sporting career ==
Irezábal went on to return to Spain, but rather than joining the ranks of his father's club, Athletic Bilbao, he instead joined Atlético Madrid, becoming a personal friend of the then president Vicente Calderón, who appointed him as the club's treasurer in 1968. Following Calderón's resignation on 16 June 1980, Irezábal was named the 22nd president of Atlético, and called elections for 24 July, which he lost to doctor Alfonso Cabeza, who took over on 31 July, thus having one of the shortest presidential reigns in the club's history.

Cabeza named him the club's second vice-president. During his time at the board of Atlético, Irezábal did not apply the philosophy that his father had advocated years earlier at Bilbao. Outside of sports, he was a Mercantile Superintendent and an Insurance Actuary.

== Death ==
Irezábal died in Madrid on 14 June 1987, at the age of 77.
