= Pedro de Astigarraga =

Spanish doctor, footballer, and sports leader

Personal information
- Full name: Pedro de Astigarraga Amezaga
- Date of birth: 18 February 1882
- Place of birth: Bilbao, Biscay, Spain
- Date of death: 9 September 1965 (aged 83)
- Place of death: Bilbao, Biscay, Spain
- Position: Forward

Senior career*
Years	Team	Apps	(Gls)
1903–04	RCD Espanyol		
1905–06	Athletic Club		
1914–15	Athletic Club		
6th President of Athletic Bilbao
In office 1910–1911
Preceded by	Alberto Zarraoa
Succeeded by	Alejandro de la Sota
8th President of Athletic Bilbao
In office 1917–1919
Preceded by	Alejandro de la Sota
Succeeded by	Ricardo de Irezabal
- * Club domestic league appearances and goals

Pedro de Astigarraga Amezaga (18 February 1882 – 9 September 1965) was a Spanish doctor and footballer who played as a forward for RCD Espanyol and Athletic Bilbao. He later served as the 6th president of the latter club between 1910 and 1911, and again between 1917 and 1919.

== Early life and education ==
Pedro de Astigarraga was born Bilbao on 18 February 1882. He studied medicine in Barcelona and Madrid, specializing in France and Germany.

== Sporting career ==
In 1902, the 20-year-old Astigarraga was among the founding members of Real Club Marítimo del Abra, being the no. 17.

In his youth, Astigarraga was one of the founders of Athletic Bilbao in 1901, at the age of 19. While studying in Barcelona, he joined the ranks of Espanyol, making his debut in a match against Sant Gervasi, on a day when an unusual formation was presented. Together with Ángel Ponz, Gustavo Green, Emilio Sampere, and the three Joaquins (Escardó, Carril, and García), Belauste was part of the team that won the first edition of the Catalan championship in 1903–04.

Astigarraga was also a player of the Athletic Club in the 1905–06 season, and then again in the 1914–15 season, and president of the club in the 1910–11 season, and then again between 1917 and 1919.

== Professional career ==
In 1918, Astigarraga was elected councilor of the Bilbao City Council, which recognized his work by awarding him the town's gold medal. In 1941 he was appointed president of the Official College of Physicians of Bizkaia. He collaborated in various medical journals and attended several International Congresses. He also appeared as a member of the International Society of Gastroenterology and presided over both the Vizcaya Pro-Cardiacos Foundation and the "Juan Urrutia" Pension and Retirement Fund.

== Death ==
Zarraoa married María del Rosario Vicenta Urigüen y Gallo-Alcántara. He was the great-grandfather of Andrés Merello, from the RCD Espanyol's Communication Department.

He died in Bilbao on 9 September 1965, at the age of 83. A street was named after him.

== Honours ==
RCD Espanyol

- Catalan championship:
  - Champions (1): 1903–04
