= Fernando Lamikiz Garai =

Fernando Lamikiz Garai (born 1959 in Guernica, Biscay, Basque Country, Spain) is a lawyer, economist and former president of Athletic Bilbao. Lamikiz studied economic law at the Deusto University. After further studying in Munich, he returned to Deusto as a lecturer in Civil Rights. He was member of the board of directors of Athletic from 1994 to 2001, heading the legal department.

He was president of Athletic from September 2004, until his resignation in September 2006. He stepped down following Athletic's poor performance in the 2005-06 La Liga season and uninspired beginning of the 2006–07 season, combined with prolonged negative press surrounding his involvement in the illegal attempt to sign defender Iban Zubiaurre from rivals Real Sociedad. His resignation, widely believed to have come as the result of sustained protest by vocal supporters of Athletic, was effected on 27 September 2006. His deputy, Ana Urkijo, took on the role until 2007, becoming the club's first female president.
