= Iban Zubiaurre =

Spanish retired footballer (born 1983)

Personal information
- Full name: Iban Zubiaurre Urrutia
- Date of birth: 22 January 1983 (age 43)
- Place of birth: Mendaro, Spain
- Height: 1.76 m (5 ft 9 in)
- Position: Right-back

Youth career
- Real Sociedad

Senior career*
| Years | Team | Apps | (Gls) |
| 2000–2005 | Real Sociedad B | 53 | (2) |
| 2004–2005 | Real Sociedad | 14 | (0) |
| 2006–2013 | Athletic Bilbao | 2 | (0) |
| 2008–2009 | → Elche (loan) | 23 | (1) |
| 2010–2011 | → Albacete (loan) | 10 | (0) |
| 2012–2013 | → Salamanca (loan) | 33 | (3) |
| 2013 | Racing Santander | 0 | (0) |
| Total | | 135 | (6) |

International career
| 1999–2000 | Spain U16 | 8 | (0) |
| 2001 | Spain U17 | 3 | (0) |
| 2001 | Spain U18 | 5 | (0) |
| 2002 | Spain U19 | 5 | (0) |
| 2005 | Spain U21 | 1 | (0) |
- * Club domestic league appearances and goals

Iban Zubiaurre Urrutia (born 22 January 1983) is a Spanish former professional footballer who played as a right-back.

== Club career ==
Zubiaurre was born in Mendaro, Gipuzkoa. After making his Real Sociedad first-team debut during the 2004–05 season, he achieved notoriety as a result of a lawsuit in which his first club prevented him from playing for Athletic Bilbao for 14 months, due to an alleged contractual dispute in his transfer between the two Basque sides.

Zubiaurre, who represented Real Sociedad at youth level, was introduced as a new Athletic Bilbao player in 2005 by the latter's president Fernando Lamikiz, despite still being under contract. He was without the legal ability to terminate it, having a year left to run and a buyout clause of €33 million (the former had activated a one-season optional extension to the deal, while the latter asserted that he was a free agent). Real insisted that Athletic pay the entire amount, with the player not being allowed to play professional football during the subsequent legal battle; SCD Durango, a regional side, requested to field him but were denied permission.

Fifteen months after the lawsuit began, a judge ruled that Athletic had to pay Real Sociedad €5 million, and were granted permission to field Zubiaurre for the 2006–07 campaign. He was presented a second time at San Mamés Stadium on 16 November 2006 and was given the number 12 shirt.

On 11 February 2007, Zubiaurre played his first La Liga match for Athletic, appearing against Atlético Madrid as a substitute in a 1–0 away defeat. That was his only game of the season, in which his team avoided relegation on the last matchday.

Zubiaurre also only featured once in 2007–08, in a 2–0 loss at Getafe CF on 31 October 2007. After almost two years on the sidelines, he left in order to gain more playing time, joining Segunda División side Elche CF on a season-long loan.

Returning to Athletic for the 2009–10 campaign, Zubiaurre's season input consisted of 15 minutes against FK Austria Wien (3–0 win at home) in the UEFA Europa League group stage. In July 2010, another loan ensued, also in the second tier, as he signed with Albacete Balompié.

Zubiaurre was deemed surplus to requirements in 2011–12 after the appointment of manager Marcelo Bielsa, alongside teammates Koikili and Aitor Ocio. He remained with the team, however.

Zubiaurre was loaned to UD Salamanca in the Segunda División B for the 2012–13 season. He moved to Racing de Santander in August 2013, being waived after only one month and no matches played.

== Honours ==
Spain U19

- UEFA European Under-19 Championship: 2002
