= Vicente Calderón =

Spanish businessman

- Born: Vicente Calderón Pérez-Cavada; 27 May 1913; Torrelavega, Cantabria, Spain
- Died: 24 March 1987 (aged 73); Madrid, Spain
- Resting place: Gandia, Valencian Community, Spain
- Occupation: Businessman
- Known for: Former president of Atlético Madrid

Vicente Calderón Pérez-Cavada (Spanish pronunciation: [biˈθente kaldeˈɾom ˈpeɾeθ kaˈβaða]; 27 May 1913 – 24 March 1987) was a Spanish businessman and president of Atlético Madrid for 20 years.

As President of Atlético Madrid he helped in getting their new stadium built, and in 1971 it was renamed Estadio Vicente Calderón in his honour.
