= 2006–07 La Liga =

76th season of La Liga

La Liga
- Season: 2006–07
- Dates: 26 August 2006 – 17 June 2007
- Champions: Real Madrid; 30th title
- Relegated: Celta Vigo; Real Sociedad; Gimnàstic
- Champions League: Real Madrid; Barcelona; Sevilla; Valencia
- UEFA Cup: Villarreal; Zaragoza; Getafe (as Copa del Rey runners-up)
- Intertoto Cup: Atlético Madrid
- Matches: 380
- Goals: 941 (2.48 per match)
- Top goalscorer: Ruud van Nistelrooy (25 goals)
- Biggest home win: Osasuna 5–1 Real Betis (14 January 2007); Gimnàstic 4–0 Espanyol (28 January 2007); Barcelona 4–0 Villarreal (25 November 2006); Sevilla 4–0 Levante (29 August 2006); Sevilla 4–0 Deportivo La Coruña (20 December 2006); Valencia 4–0 Gimnàstic (1 October 2006); Valencia 4–0 Deportivo La Coruña (10 December 2006)
- Biggest away win: Atlético Madrid 0–6 Barcelona (20 May 2007)
- Highest scoring: Racing Santander 5–4 Athletic Bilbao (1 April 2007)

The 2006–07 La Liga season was the 76th since its establishment. It began on 27 August 2006, and concluded on 17 June 2007.

Real Madrid won La Liga thanks to a superior head-to-head record against runners-up Barcelona. Celta Vigo, Real Sociedad and Gimnàstic were relegated.

Barcelona was in first place for much of the season while arch-rivals Real Madrid were six points behind and in fourth. However, Barcelona began playing inconsistently after January, while Madrid's form improved in that same period. On 12 May 2007, Real Madrid took the league lead for the first time all season after defeating Espanyol 4–3, coming back from a 3–1 first-half deficit. The following Sunday, Barcelona dropped points with a 1–1 draw to struggling Real Betis. By virtue of their superior head-to-head record, Madrid sat at the top of La Liga with both teams having four league games left.

On the penultimate day of the season, Barcelona failed to overcome city rivals Espanyol in the Barcelona derby, drawing 2–2. In the final La Liga matches, Barcelona thrashed Gimnàstic 5–1, but Madrid came back from a 1–0 deficit to beat Mallorca 3–1 and clinch the title thanks to head-to-head superiority.

== Teams ==
Twenty teams competed in the league – the top seventeen teams from the previous season and the three teams promoted from the Segunda División. The promoted teams were Recreativo, Gimnàstic and Levante, returning to the top flight after an absence of three, fifty-six and one years respectively. They replaced Alaves, Cádiz (both teams relegated after a season's presence) and Málaga (ending their seven-year top flight spell).

Location of teams in La Liga 2006–07

=== Stadiums ===
Team	Stadium	Capacity
Barcelona	Camp Nou	98,772
Real Madrid	Santiago Bernabéu	80,354
Espanyol	Estadi Olímpic Lluís Companys	55,926
Atlético Madrid	Vicente Calderón	55,005
Valencia	Mestalla	55,000
Real Betis	Manuel Ruiz de Lopera	52,132
Sevilla	Ramón Sánchez Pizjuán	45,500
Athletic Bilbao	San Mamés	39,750
Deportivo de La Coruña	Riazor	34,600
Real Zaragoza	La Romareda	34,596
Celta de Vigo	Estadio Balaídos	32,500
Real Sociedad	Anoeta	32,200
Levante*	Ciudad de Valencia	25,354
Mallorca	ONO Estadi	23,142
Villarreal	El Madrigal	23,000
Racing de Santander	El Sardinero	22,400
Recreativo de Huelva*	Nuevo Colombino	19,860
Osasuna	Estadio Reyno de Navarra	19,553
Getafe	Coliseum Alfonso Pérez	16,300
Gimnàstic de Tarragona*	Nou Estadi	14,500

(*) Promoted from Segunda División.

=== Personnel and kits ===
Team	Chairman	Head Coach	Kit manufacturer	Shirt sponsor (front)	Shirt sponsor (back)	Shirt sponsor (sleeve)	Shorts sponsor
Athletic Bilbao	Fernando García	(Spain) Mané	100% Athletic	None	None	None	None
Atlético Madrid	Enrique Cerezo	(Mexico) Javier Aguirre	Nike	Kia	Kyocera	None	Asisa Salud
Barcelona	Joan Laporta	(Netherlands) Frank Rijkaard	Nike	UNICEF	None	TV3	None
Betis	Leon Gomez	(France) Luis Fernandez	Kappa	Andalucía/Grupo Azabache/Clipeus (in cup matches)	Andalucía	None	Grupo Azabache
Celta de Vigo	Horacio Gómez	(Bulgaria) Hristo Stoichkov	Umbro	Citroën	None	Televisión de Galicia	Citroën
Deportivo	Augusto Lendoiro	(Spain) Joaquín Caparrós	Joma	Fadesa	None	None	None
Espanyol	Daniel Sánchez Llibre	(Spain) Ernesto Valverde	uhlsport	Quat Inversiones	Interapuestas.com	TV3	Hoteles Hesperia
Getafe	Ángel Torres	(Germany) Bernd Schuster	Joma	Grupo Galco	Opción Centro de Ocio	None	Propietarios del Suelo de Getafe
Gimnàstic	Raül Font	(Spain) Paco Flores	Nàstic	Tarragona	Pisoperfecto	TV3	Costa Daurada, Hipoteca Mania
Levante	Julio Romero	(Spain) Abel Resino	Luanvi	Comunitat Valenciana	None	Canal Nou	Top Recambios
Mallorca	Vicenç Grande	(Spain) Gregorio Manzano	Reial	Viajes Iberia	Construcciones Llabrés Feliu	IB3	Illes Balears
Osasuna	Luis Sabalza	(Spain) Cuco Ziganda	Astore	Restaura	Reyno de Navarra	Caja Navarra	Yingli Solar
Racing Santander	Francisco Pernía	(Spain) Miguel Ángel Portugal	Joma	Santander Ciudad Excelente	Cantabria 2006: Liébana Tierra de Júbilo	None	None
Real Sociedad	Miguel Ángel Fuentes	(Spain) Miguel Ángel Lotina	Astore	FIATC Seguros	NGS Europe	NGS Europe	FIATC Seguros, NGS Europe
Real Madrid	Ramón Calderón	(Italy) Fabio Capello	Adidas	BenQ Siemens	None	None	None
Recreativo	Francisco Mendoza	(Spain) Marcelino	Cejudo	Cepsa/Caja San Fernando	Caja San Fernando/Andalucía	None	None
Sevilla	José María del Nido	(Spain) Juande Ramos	Joma	888.com	Andalucía	Andalucía	888.com
Valencia	Juan Bautista Soler	(Spain) Quique Sánchez Flores	Nike	Toyota	None	Canal Nou	None
Villarreal	Fernando Roig	(Chile) Manuel Pellegrini	Puma	Aeroport Castelló	None	Canal Nou	None
Zaragoza	Eduardo Bandrés	(Spain) Víctor Fernández	Lotto	Expo Zaragoza 2008 Telefónica	None	None	None

== League table ==
Pos	Team	Pld	W	D	L	GF	GA	GD	Pts	Qualification or relegation
1	Real Madrid (C)	38	23	7	8	66	40	+26	76 (Note: RMA 2–0 BAR; BAR 3–3 RMA)	Qualification for the Champions League group stage
2	Barcelona	38	22	10	6	78	33	+45	76	Qualification for the Champions League group stage
3	Sevilla	38	21	8	9	64	35	+29	71	Qualification for the Champions League third qualifying round
4	Valencia	38	20	6	12	57	42	+15	66	Qualification for the Champions League third qualifying round
5	Villarreal	38	18	8	12	48	44	+4	62	Qualification for the UEFA Cup first round
6	Zaragoza	38	16	12	10	55	43	+12	60 (Note: ATM 0–1 ZAR; ZAR 1–0 ATM)	Qualification for the UEFA Cup first round
7	Atlético Madrid	38	17	9	12	47	40	+7	60	Qualification for the Intertoto Cup third round
8	Recreativo	38	15	9	14	54	52	+2	54	
9	Getafe	38	14	10	14	39	33	+6	52	Qualification for the UEFA Cup first round (Note: Since Sevilla, winners of 2006–07 Copa del Rey, was qualified for the 2007–08 UEFA Champions League, so losing cup finalists Getafe earned a spot in the first round of the 2007–08 UEFA Cup.)
10	Racing	38	12	14	12	42	48	−6	50	
11	Espanyol	38	12	13	13	46	53	−7	49 (Note: MLL 1–0 ESP; ESP 3–1 MLL)	
12	Mallorca	38	14	7	17	41	47	−6	49	
13	RC Deportivo	38	12	11	15	32	45	−13	47	
14	Osasuna	38	13	7	18	51	49	+2	46	
15	Levante	38	10	12	16	38	54	−16	42	
16	Real Betis	38	8	16	14	36	49	−13	40 (Note: BET 3–0 ATH; ATH 1–2 BET)	
17	Athletic Bilbao	38	10	10	18	44	62	−18	40	
18	Celta (R)	38	10	9	19	40	59	−19	39	Relegation to the Segunda División
19	Real Sociedad (R)	38	8	11	19	30	46	−16	35	Relegation to the Segunda División
20	Gimnàstic (R)	38	7	7	24	33	67	−34	28	Relegation to the Segunda División

Source: LFP
Rules for classification: 1st points; 2nd head-to-head points; 3rd head-to-head goal difference; 4th head-to-head goals scored; 5th goal difference; 6th number of goals scored; 7th Fair-play points
(C) Champions; (R) Relegated

== Results ==
Home \ Away	ATH	ATM	FCB	BET	CEL	RCD	ESP	GET	LEV	MLL	GIM	OSA	RAC	RMA	RSO	REC	SFC	VCF	VIL	ZAR
Athletic Bilbao		1–4	1–3	1–2	0–1	1–1	2–1	2–0	2–0	1–0	0–2	0–3	0–0	1–4	1–1	4–2	1–3	1–0	0–1	0–0
Atlético Madrid	1–0		0–6	0–0	2–3	2–0	1–2	1–0	2–1	1–1	0–0	1–0	1–1	1–1	1–1	2–1	2–1	0–1	3–1	0–1
Barcelona	3–0	1–1		1–1	3–1	2–1	2–2	1–0	1–0	1–0	3–0	3–0	2–0	3–3	1–0	3–0	3–1	1–1	4–0	3–1
Betis	3–0	0–1	1–1		1–0	1–1	1–1	0–2	2–1	0–1	1–1	0–5	1–1	0–1	0–1	0–0	0–0	2–1	3–3	1–1
Celta de Vigo	1–1	1–3	2–3	2–1		1–0	0–2	2–1	1–2	0–3	1–1	0–2	2–2	1–2	0–0	1–2	1–2	3–2	1–1	1–1
Deportivo La Coruña	0–2	1–0	1–1	0–1	0–1		0–0	1–0	0–0	1–0	1–0	1–0	0–0	2–0	2–0	2–5	1–2	1–2	2–0	3–2
Espanyol	3–2	2–1	3–1	2–2	2–1	1–3		1–5	1–1	3–1	0–1	0–0	2–2	0–1	1–0	0–1	2–1	1–1	1–1	1–2
Getafe	0–0	1–4	1–1	1–1	1–0	2–0	0–1		0–0	1–0	0–1	2–0	1–0	1–0	1–0	1–1	0–0	3–0	3–0	2–2
Levante	0–0	0–3	1–1	1–1	1–1	2–0	0–0	1–1		0–1	2–0	1–4	2–0	1–4	2–0	2–1	2–4	4–2	0–2	0–0
Mallorca	1–3	0–0	1–4	2–0	2–2	0–0	1–0	2–0	3–1		1–0	3–1	1–2	0–1	0–0	2–1	0–0	0–1	1–2	2–1
Gimnàstic	2–3	0–2	1–5	0–1	1–2	0–0	4–0	1–3	2–1	2–3		2–3	2–2	1–3	0–1	1–1	1–0	1–1	0–3	1–0
Osasuna	1–1	1–2	0–0	5–1	0–1	4–1	0–2	0–2	2–1	3–0	2–0		0–1	1–4	2–0	1–1	0–0	1–1	1–4	2–2
Racing Santander	5–4	0–1	0–3	0–2	1–1	0–0	1–1	1–0	2–3	0–2	4–1	1–0		2–1	1–0	4–3	0–0	1–0	2–1	0–2
Real Madrid	2–1	1–1	2–0	0–0	1–2	3–1	4–3	1–1	0–1	3–1	2–0	2–0	3–1		2–0	0–3	3–2	2–1	0–0	1–0
Real Sociedad	0–2	2–0	0–2	0–0	3–1	0–1	1–1	0–0	1–0	3–1	3–2	2–1	0–0	1–2		2–3	1–3	0–1	0–1	1–3
Recreativo	0–0	1–0	0–4	2–0	4–2	1–1	0–1	1–2	0–1	1–1	2–1	2–0	4–2	2–3	1–0		1–3	2–0	2–1	1–1
Sevilla	4–1	3–1	2–1	3–2	2–0	4–0	3–1	1–0	4–0	1–2	2–1	2–0	0–0	2–1	0–0	2–1		3–0	0–1	3–1
Valencia	1–1	3–1	2–1	2–1	1–0	4–0	3–2	2–0	3–0	3–1	4–0	1–0	0–2	0–1	3–3	2–0	2–0		2–3	2–0
Villarreal	3–1	0–1	2–0	3–2	1–0	0–2	0–0	1–0	1–1	2–1	2–0	1–4	2–1	1–0	1–1	0–1	0–0	0–1		3–2
Zaragoza	4–3	1–0	1–0	2–1	2–0	1–1	3–0	3–1	2–2	2–0	3–0	1–2	0–0	2–2	3–2	0–0	2–1	0–1	1–0	

Source: LFP
Legend: Blue = home team win; Yellow = draw; Red = away team win.

== Awards ==
=== Annual awards ===
Don Balón Awards
Award	Winner	Club
Best Team	(Spain) Sevilla FC	Sevilla
Best Player	(Spain) Santi Cazorla	Recreativo
Best Spanish Player	(Spain) Santi Cazorla	Recreativo
Best Foreign Player	(Argentina) Lionel Messi	Barcelona
Best Passer	(England) David Beckham	Real Madrid
Best Veteran	(Argentina) Roberto Abbondanzieri	Getafe
Revelation Player	(Spain) Alexis Ruano	Getafe
Best Manager	(Spain) Juande Ramos	Sevilla
Best Referee	(Spain) Alberto Undiano Mallenco	
Best Director	(Spain) Ángel Torres	Getafe

=== Team of the Season ===

Don Balón Team of the Season
Goalkeeper	(Argentina) Roberto Abbondanzieri (Getafe)			
Defenders	(Brazil) Dani Alves (Sevilla)	(Spain) Sergio Ramos (Real Madrid)	(Spain) Carles Puyol (Barcelona)	(Spain) José Enrique (Villarreal)
Midfielders	(Spain) Andrés Iniesta (Barcelona)	(Spain) Javier Casquero (Getafe)	(Argentina) Lionel Messi (Barcelona)	(Spain) Santi Cazorla (Recreativo)
Forwards	(Netherlands) Ruud van Nistelrooy (Real Madrid)		(Mali) Frédéric Kanouté (Sevilla)	

=== Pichichi Trophy ===
The Pichichi Trophy is awarded to the player who scores the most goals in a season.

Rank	Player	Club	Goals
1	(Netherlands) Ruud van Nistelrooy	Real Madrid	25
2	(Argentina) Diego Milito	Zaragoza	23
3	(Mali) Frédéric Kanouté	Sevilla	21
3	(Brazil) Ronaldinho	Barcelona	21
5	(Uruguay) Diego Forlán	Villarreal	19
6	(Spain) David Villa	Valencia	16
7	(Brazil) Fernando Baiano	Celta Vigo	15
7	(Spain) Raúl Tamudo	Espanyol	15
9	(Argentina) Lionel Messi	Barcelona	14
9	(Spain) Fernando Torres	Atlético Madrid	14

Source: LFP

=== Zamora Trophy ===
The Ricardo Zamora Trophy is awarded to the goalkeeper with the lowest ratio of goals conceded to matches played.

Rank	Player	Club	Goals against	Matches	Average
1	(Argentina) Roberto Abbondanzieri	Getafe	30	36	0.83
2	(Spain) Víctor Valdés	Barcelona	33	38	0.87
3	(Argentina) Leo Franco	Atlético Madrid	28	32	0.88
4	(Uruguay) Sebastián Viera	Villarreal	25	28	0.89
5	(Spain) Andrés Palop	Sevilla	32	34	0.94
6	(Chile) Claudio Bravo	Real Sociedad	29	29	1
7	(Spain) Santiago Cañizares	Valencia	33	32	1.03
8	(Spain) Iker Casillas	Real Madrid	40	38	1.05
9	(Spain) Toño	Racing Santander	36	32	1.13
10	(Spain) José Francisco Molina	Levante	39	34	1.15

=== Fair Play award ===
Rank	Club	Points
1	Recreativo Huelva	84
2	Getafe	103
3	Mallorca	104
4	Barcelona	106
5	Villarreal	108
6	Real Sociedad	110
7	Gimnàstic	116
8	Zaragoza	125
9	Valencia	126
10	Athletic Bilbao	129
11	Deportivo La Coruña	131
12	Espanyol	133
13	Real Madrid	135
14	Celta Vigo	137
15	Racing Santander	139
16	Atlético Madrid	144
17	Osasuna	145
18	Levante	150
19	Sevilla	151
20	Real Betis	189

- Source: Guia As de La Liga 2007–08, p. 140 (sports magazine)

=== Pedro Zaballa award ===
Cuco Ziganda (Osasuna head coach) and David Belenguer (Getafe footballer)

=== Overall ===
- Most wins – Real Madrid (23)
- Fewest wins – Gimnàstic (7)
- Most draws – Betis (16)
- Fewest draws – Valencia (6)
- Most losses – Gimnàstic (24)
- Fewest losses – Barcelona (6)
- Most goals scored – Barcelona (78)
- Fewest goals scored – Deportivo La Coruña and Real Sociedad (32)
- Most goals conceded – Gimnàstic (69)
- Fewest goals conceded – Barcelona and Getafe (33)

== Attendances ==
No.	Club	Average	Change	Highest
1	FC Barcelona	74,078	1,2%	97,823
2	Real Madrid	71,526	0,0%	80,000
3	Sevilla FC	43,632	8,4%	45,500
4	Atlético de Madrid	42,316	9,4%	56,000
5	Valencia CF	40,368	-6,3%	52,000
6	Real Betis	38,737	0,8%	50,000
7	Athletic Club	37,158	0,7%	40,000
8	Real Zaragoza	27,868	-1,0%	34,500
9	Real Sociedad	23,076	2,5%	31,450
10	RCD Espanyol	20,193	-9,6%	33,052
11	Villarreal CF	18,632	0,8%	25,000
12	Recreativo de Huelva	18,225	59,6%	20,096
13	Levante UD	16,799	49,5%	25,000
14	CA Osasuna	16,712	4,0%	18,545
15	Deportivo de La Coruña	16,620	-13,0%	34,600
16	RCD Mallorca	16,605	4,8%	21,000
17	Racing de Santander	16,222	10,2%	21,741
18	Celta de Vigo	14,479	-14,6%	25,000
19	Gimnàstic de Tarragona	12,453	50,3%	14,600
20	Getafe CF	11,053	-13,4%	14,000

== See also ==
- List of transfers of La Liga – 2006-07 season
- 2006–07 Segunda División
