= Ana Urkijo =

Spanish lawyer (born 1954)

Ana Urkijo Elorriaga (born 1954, name alternatively spelled Urquijo) is a Spanish lawyer who was the president of Basque football club Athletic Bilbao from 2006 to 2007.

A member of Athletic since 1969, Urkijo practised as a lawyer and a real estate agent before becoming involved in her hometown club. Her father Rufino served as vice-president of Athletic in the 1970s and 80s.

Previously a director at the club for several years, Urkijo was elected following the resignation of Fernando Lamikiz in September 2006, becoming the first female president in the history of Athletic Bilbao, and only the second to hold the position in the history of La Liga, after Teresa Rivero of Rayo Vallecano.

She did not stand for election in July 2007, when Fernando García Macua was appointed in the role. As lawyer she is associated with the Biscay Bar Association.
