= 2012–13 FC Barcelona season =

114th season in existence of FC Barcelona

Barcelona
2012–13 season
- President: Sandro Rosell
- Head coach: Tito Vilanova
- Stadium: Camp Nou
- La Liga: 1st
- Copa del Rey: Semi-finals
- Supercopa de España: Runners-up
- UEFA Champions League: Semi-finals
- Top goalscorer: League: Lionel Messi (46); All: Lionel Messi (60)
- Highest home attendance: 96,589 vs Real Madrid (7 October 2012)
- Lowest home attendance: 37,607 vs Córdoba (10 January 2013)
- Average home league attendance: 73,282 (including Joan Gamper Trophy)
Home colours	Away colours

The 2012–13 season was Futbol Club Barcelona's 114th season in existence and the club's 82nd consecutive season in the top flight of Spanish football. The season marked the managerial debut of Tito Vilanova, who served as Pep Guardiola's longtime assistant. Vilanova assumed management of the club after Guardiola, who had managed Barcelona for the prior four seasons, declined to renew his contract.

Barcelona finished first in La Liga but lost in the semi-finals of both the Copa del Rey and the UEFA Champions League. The club also set a record (later equaled by Real Madrid) by scoring in all 38 La Liga matches in the season.

== Season overview ==
=== May/June ===
On 29 May, Barcelona announced their first pre-season match to be against Hamburger SV in occasion of the German outfit's 125th anniversary celebration. It will be Tito Vilanova's first match in charge of the first team. The second match will be on 28 July in Tangier, Morocco, versus an all-star starting XI from the Moroccan Football League at the Stade de Tanger. This will be their first appearance in Morocco in 38 years.

On 1 June, Barcelona announced Brazilian defender Henrique will not return to team after both agreed to terminate the player's contract on 30 June. Henrique did not make an appearance with the first team and was on-loan in 2008–09 with German club Bayer Leverkusen, 2009–10, and 2010–11 with Racing de Santander and in 2011–12, with Brazilian club Palmeiras.

On 28 June, Barcelona and Valencia CF reached an agreement on the transfer of left back Jordi Alba for €14 million. The player joined the team after UEFA Euro 2012 and signed a five-year deal.

=== July ===
On 7 July, Barcelona announced that Seydou Keita would not renew his contract for the upcoming season. The Mali midfielder leaves after four years and 14 titles accumulated while at Barça.

On 10 July, the Royal Spanish Football Federation released the fixture list for the 2012–13 season, with Barcelona opening the season at Camp Nou against Real Sociedad. President Ángel María Villar also confirmed that both Barcelona manager Tito Vilanova and Real Madrid manager José Mourinho will not have to serve their suspensions in the 2012 Supercopa de España for their altercation in last year's edition. Barça's Board Secretary Toni Freixa stated at a press conference that an "aggression can never go unpunished" and "we understand that an aggression on a coach deserves punishment. This measure doesn't make the aggressor innocent but it allows them to believe that they can keep on being aggressive without consequences. It's a bad example for Spanish football that this aggression hasn't been punished."

On 13 July, Barcelona announced that the pre-season match on 28 July would be played against Raja Casablanca instead of Moroccan All-Star XI as previously announced.

On 24 July, Barcelona opened their pre-season with a 2–1 victory over Hamburg at the Imtech Arena. Goals scored by Dani Alves and Gerard Deulofeu to set off a victorious debut for Vilanova. Defender Marc Muniesa left the match with a torn ACL in his right knee in the 52nd minute that could possibly see him miss the rest of the season. The next day, Barcelona doctors confirmed that Muniesa will miss up to six months due to the injury picked up the day before.

On 27 July, Barcelona informed the Catalan Football Federation that Barcelona B, instead of the first team, will dispute the Supercopa de Catalunya against Espanyol set for 31 July at the Olímpic Lluís Companys.

On 28 July, Barcelona defeated Raja Casablanca 8–0 in Tangier with Lionel Messi supplying a hat-trick while Alexis Sánchez added another two goals while Dani Alves, Sergi Gómez, and Deulofeu scored one each.

On 30 July, Barcelona announced they accepted the rescheduled date of the Supercopa de Catalunya after the Catalan Football Association proposed the match to be played on 26 September 2012. They also stated that they would play the strongest team possible as chosen by the manager.

=== August ===
On 4 August, Barcelona defeated Paris Saint-Germain 4–1 in penalty shoot-out after a 2–2 draw in regular time for the Trophée de Paris in Paris. Rafinha and Lionel Messi scored the two goals which was kicked off by Eric Abidal, who took the ceremonial kick off.

On 8 August, Barcelona defeated Manchester United 2–0 in a best-of-three penalty shoot-out after a 0–0 draw after regular time. Víctor Valdés saved a Wayne Rooney penalty in the first half of stoppage time, while Jordi Alba made his debut for Barcelona in the second half of the match.

On 11 August, Barcelona defeated Dinamo București 2–0 with goals by Lionel Messi and Ibrahim Afellay. The two long-time injured Barça players, David Villa (fractured tibia) and Andreu Fontàs (torn ACL), made their returns.

On 18 August, Barcelona and English club Arsenal reached an agreement on the transfer of Cameroon midfielder Alex Song for €19 million. The player signed a five-year deal with an €80 million release clause.

On 19 August, Barcelona started their 2012–13 La Liga season with 5–1 home win over Real Sociedad with two goals by Lionel Messi and one each by Carles Puyol, Pedro and David Villa. It also marked a successful debut for Tito Vilanova's first league match as manager.

On 20 August, Barcelona suffered their first defeat of the season at the hands of Sampdoria for the Joan Gamper Trophy by a score of 1–0. Sergi Roberto was named the best player of the match.

On 23 August, Barcelona defeated Real Madrid in the first leg of the Supercopa de España, 3–2, with goals by Pedro, Lionel Messi and Xavi. It was Vilanova's first game and win in a Clásico as manager. Messi's 14th Clásico goal allowed him to equal César Rodríguez's record for Barcelona and marked the first time a player scored in four consecutive Spanish Super Cup matches.

On 26 August, Barcelona came back from a 1–0 half-time deficit to defeat CA Osasuna in El Sadar with a 2–1 victory behind two goals from Lionel Messi in the last 15 minutes of the match. Carles Puyol finished with a broken cheekbone after a collision with Osasuna's forward Roland Lamah towards the end of the match, that also saw manager Vilanova ejected for the first time by referee Muñiz Fernández for excessive argument over a play the Barça manager deemed a foul not called in favour of his team.

On 29 August, the RFEF Competition Committee suspended manager Tito Vilanova after he was ejected in the Osasuna match for what the referee deemed as "angrily protesting a play of the match, after he had been warned by the assistant referee." Barça are set to appeal the suspension. Later that day, Barça were defeated in the second leg of the Supercopa de España 2–1 at the Santiago Bernabéu and lost the tie on away goals. Real Madrid jumped out to a 2–0 lead within the first 20 minutes and the comeback was made even tougher for Barça after the sending off of Adriano in the 28th minute. Lionel Messi scored his sixth goal of the season off a free-kick and has scored in all four competitive matches to start the season for Barcelona. Alex Song made his debut for Barcelona with a perfect passing statistic.

On 30 August, UEFA conducted the group stage draw for the 2012–13 UEFA Champions League in Monaco. Barcelona were drawn into Group G along with Portuguese club Benfica, Spartak Moscow from Russia, and Scottish champions Celtic. Barcelona midfielder Andrés Iniesta received the 2011–12 UEFA Best Player in Europe Award, beating out teammate Lionel Messi and Real Madrid forward Cristiano Ronaldo for the prize.

On 31 August, Barcelona and Schalke 04 agreed on a loan of Ibrahim Afellay to the German club until 30 June 2013.

=== September ===
On 2 September, Barcelona defeated Valencia 1–0 at the Camp Nou to start the league season unbeaten before the FIFA international break. Adriano scored the lone goal in the 23rd minute.

On 12 September, Barcelona announced that midfielder Andrés Iniesta would be out 10–15 days with a pulled abductor in his right leg which he picked up during the Georgia–Spain match the day before.

On 15 September, Barcelona defeated Getafe CF with a scoreline of 4–1 at the Coliseum Alfonso Pérez. Lionel Messi started his first match in over a year on the bench but came-on in the 59th minute to score two goals. David Villa added another one as he recovers to full match fitness from his fractured leg from December 2011. Not all was celebrations for Barça, however, as their captain, Carles Puyol, suffered a strained to the posterior cruciate ligament in his left leg in the 53rd minute. The player is expected to miss four-to-six weeks due to the knee injury.

On 19 September, Barcelona made their Champions League debut for the season with a 3–2 home victory over Spartak Moscow. Cristian Tello contributed the opening goal and Lionel Messi the two winning goals, while Dani Alves scored an own goal for the visitors. Early in the first half, Barça's CB Gerard Piqué suffered a sprained left foot and will be out for two to three weeks.

On 22 September, Barcelona defeated Granada at home 2–0 behind a goal from Xavi late in the 87th minute and an own goal in stoppage time to seal the victory.

On 28 September, Lionel Messi won his third consecutive Onze d'Or presented by the French magazine Onze Mondial. With 47.45% of the votes, Messi beat out Cristiano Ronaldo and Atlético Madrid forward Radamel Falcao for the trophy.

On 29 September, Barcelona came from two goals down to claim a 3–2 victory over Sevilla at the Ramón Sánchez Pizjuán Stadium. After Sevilla took a 2–0 lead, two goals by Cesc Fàbregas and one by substitute David Villa in injury time kept Barça on their perfect start to the league season. In the same match, Thiago picked up a knee injury that will sideline him for up to eight weeks.

=== October ===
On 2 October, Barcelona defeated Benfica at the Estádio da Luz with 2–0 scoreline to stay unbeaten at the top of the group. Alexis Sánchez and Cesc Fàbregas contributed the winning goals, while Sergio Busquets was sent off in the 89th minute. Late in the second half of the game, Carles Puyol suffered yet another injury when he landed awkwardly and dislocated his left elbow. He is expected to be out for eight weeks.

On 7 October, Barcelona drew their first game of the season with a 2–2 at home against Real Madrid. Both goals came from Lionel Messi, bringing him just one goal short of the all time Clásico scoring record of 18 goals by Alfredo Di Stéfano. Early in the match, Dani Alves picked up a hamstring injury in his left leg and will be out for three weeks.

On 15 October, Barcelona announced defender Andreu Fontàs would be loan out to Mallorca until the end of the season.

On 20 October, Barcelona took a wild match in A Coruña, beating Deportivo de La Coruña 5–4 at the Estadio Riazor. A hat-trick by Lionel Messi gave the visitors all the hard earned three points in where they raced out to a three-goal lead within the first 20 minutes of the match.

On 23 October, Barcelona defeated Celtic 2–1 at home. A goal by Andrés Iniesta at the end of the first half and a Jordi Alba goal in the closing seconds helped Barcelona to take away the win in Xavi's 150th international game with Barcelona.

On 27 October, Barcelona defeated Rayo Vallecano with a dominating scoreline of 5–0 in Vallecas. Leo Messi scored a brace, while David Villa, Xavi and Cesc Fàbregas contributed with a goal each. This win equalled Barcelona's best start in the La Liga.

On 30 October, Barcelona started their Copa del Rey defence with a victory in Vitoria-Gasteiz over Alavés in the first leg with a 3–0 win. Goals from David Villa, Andrés Iniesta and Cesc Fàbregas gave Barça the victory.

=== November ===
On 3 November, Barcelona defeated Celta de Vigo 3–1 at home. With goals by Adriano, David Villa and Jordi Alba, Barça confirmed their best start in La Liga in club history. Adriano had to leave the game early with a muscle tear in his right thigh and will be out of action for three weeks. The win opened a three-point gap at the top of the league over Atlético Madrid.

On 7 November, Barcelona suffered their first Champions League loss of the season with a 2–1 loss in Glasgow against Celtic. The lone goal by Lionel Messi came in the closing minutes of the game. This loss marked Barça's first away defeat in the Champions League Group Stage since 2006.

On 11 November, Barcelona defeated Mallorca 4–2 at the Iberostar. Goals by Xavi, Cristian Tello and a brace by Lionel Messi helped equalizing the best ever La Liga start after the first 11 games of the season, previously archived by Real Madrid 1968–69 and 1991–92. With 76 goals to his name in 2012, Messi also overtook Pelé's record of 75 goals in a single calendar year from 1958 and is only nine goals from drawing with the all-time record from 1972 by Gerd Müller.

On 16 November, Barcelona announced that Qatar Airways will be the new shirt sponsor starting the 2013–14 season, marking the first official commercial sponsor on the Barcelona shirt in team's history. President Sandro Rosell stated "(Qatar Airways) an ambitious brand with global aspirations, always committed to achieving the utmost excellence in its field. These are objectives with which FC Barcelona fully identifies."

On 17 November, Barcelona defeated Zaragoza with 3–1 at home with another brace by Lionel Messi and Alex Song's first goal for Barça.

On 18 November, Marc Bartra pulled the adductor in his right leg during a training session and will be sidelined for 15–20 days.

On 20 November, Barcelona defeated Spartak Moscow at the Luzhniki Stadium 3–0. One goal by Dani Alves and two by Lionel Messi helped Barça to qualify for the knockout phase of the Champions League with one game left to play.

On 25 November, Barcelona defeated Levante in the Ciutat de València 4–0. A brace by Lionel Messi and one goal each by Cesc Fàbregas and Andrés Iniesta, the latter also contributing three assists, as well as a penalty save by Víctor Valdés kept Barça on top of La Liga. For over 60 minutes Barcelona played with only La Masia graduates, after Dani Alves came off injured after 13 minutes.

On 28 November, Barcelona defeated Alavés with 3–1 at home. One goal by Adriano and two by David Villa helped Barça to advance to the Round of 16 of the Copa del Rey, where they will face Córdoba. With the brace, David Villa passed the 300 career goals mark to 301 goals as a professional, including club and country, Spain.

On 29 November, FIFA announced the three finalists for the 2012 FIFA Ballon d'Or to be presented on 7 January 2013: Lionel Messi and Andrés Iniesta from Barcelona and Cristiano Ronaldo from Real Madrid. This marks the third season in a row that at least two finalist are from Barcelona and the six year in a row that Messi makes the final three.

=== December ===
On 1 December, Barcelona defeated Athletic Bilbao 5–1 at home with two goals by Lionel Messi and one each by Gerard Piqué, Adriano, and Cesc Fàbregas. With this win Barça set up the best ever start of any team in La Liga. Messi's two goals made him equalize with César Rodríguez as Barcelona's top scorers in La Liga with 190 goals.

On 5 December, Barcelona played their first goalless game of the season, drawing 0–0 against Benfica at home. Shortly after coming on, Lionel Messi had to be carried off on a stretcher after twisting his knee. It was later revealed that Messi picked up a contusion on the outside of his left knee.

On 9 December, Barcelona defeated Real Betis in the Benito Villamarín 2–1. With two more goals by Lionel Messi, Barça continued their undefeated run in away games to start La Liga season to eight matches. Those goals also sent Messi's tally to 86 in 2012, overtaking German striker Gerd Müller's record of 85 goals in a calendar year in 1972. Early in the game, Cesc Fàbregas was subbed off with a torn biceps femoris in his left thigh and will be sidelined for three-to-four weeks.

On 12 December, Barcelona defeated Córdoba at the Nuevo Arcángel 2–0. Both goals were scored by Lionel Messi in his first Copa del Rey game of the season.

On 16 December, Barcelona defeated Atlético Madrid at home 4–1. Two goals by Lionel Messi and one each by Adriano and Sergio Busquets. This victory helped Barça to draw nine points clear at the top of the table, and Messi's goals brought his record up to 90 for the year.

On 17 December, Cristian Tello extended his contract with Barcelona until 30 June 2016, with a set buyout clause of €10 million.

On 18 December, Barcelona announced the renewal of contracts with Carles Puyol and Xavi until 2016 and Lionel Messi until 2018.

On 19 December, Barcelona's Medical Services announced that manager Tito Vilanova was to undergo surgery on the following day after a routine check-up revealed that he suffered a parotid ailment relapse, which he was operated on a year previous. During the recovery time, assistant coach Jordi Roura will lead Barça.

On 20 December, UEFA conducted the Round of 16 draw for the 2012–13 UEFA Champions League in Nyon. Barcelona were drawn to face Italian club Milan, who they last faced in the previous season's quarter-finals.

On 22 December, Barcelona won their last match of the year at the José Zorrilla against Real Valladolid with a score of 3–1. Goals by Xavi, Lionel Messi and Cristian Tello helped to keep the nine point lead on top of the table intact.

On 23 December, Barcelona announced that backup goalkeeper José Manuel Pinto came to an agreement with the club to extend his contract for another year until 30 June 2014.

=== January ===
On 6 January, Barcelona won their first match of the year at home, against Espanyol 4–0. Two goals by Pedro and one each by Xavi and Lionel Messi were scored in the first 30 minutes of the game.

On 7 January, Lionel Messi was announced the 2012 FIFA Ballon d'Or winner in Zürich. With 41.60% of the votes, Messi became the first player to win the award on four occasions, surpassing Johan Cruyff, Michel Platini and Marco van Basten, all with three. The win also gave Barcelona its tenth winner, the most all time of any European club. Barcelona also celebrated five players in the 2012 FIFA FIFPro World XI, as Messi was joined by teammates Gerard Piqué, Dani Alves, Andrés Iniesta and Xavi as the world's best for 2012.

On 10 January, Barcelona beat Córdoba in the return leg of the Copa del Rey at home by 5–0, with one goal scored by Thiago and two each by David Villa and Alexis Sánchez. With an aggregate score of 7–0, Barça went through to the quarter-finals, where they will face Málaga. Early in the second half of the game, Sergi Roberto was subbed off with a tear in his left hamstring and will be out of action for four weeks.

On 13 January, Barcelona beat Málaga at the La Rosaleda Stadium 3–1, with goals by Lionel Messi, Cesc Fàbregas and Thiago. With this win, Barça ended the first round of the season with a record-breaking 55 out of a possible 57 points.

On 16 January, Barcelona drew 2–2 against Málaga at home in the first leg of the Copa del Rey quarter-finals. Goals by Lionel Messi and Carles Puyol were scored within one minute of each other.

On 18 January, Barcelona announced that goalkeeper Víctor Valdés will not be extending his contract any further after his current contract expires on 30 June 2014.

On 19 January, Barcelona lost their first league game away against Real Sociedad at the Anoeta Stadium, 3–2. After leading by two goals from Messi and Pedro, Gerard Piqué was sent off with a second yellow and Sociedad turned the game around and scored the winning goal in the dying minutes.

On 24 January, Barcelona defeated Málaga in the La Rosaleda 4–2, with goals by Pedro, Piqué, Iniesta and Messi. With an aggregate score of 6–4, Barça went through to the Copa del Rey semi-finals, where they will face Real Madrid.

On 27 January, Barcelona defeated Osasuna at home 5–1 with four goals by Messi and one from Pedro. With those goals, Messi broke the 200-goal barrier in La Liga, becoming the youngest player to archive that feat at just 25 years and 217 days of age.

On 30 January, Barcelona drew 1–1 against Real Madrid in the Santiago Bernabéu in the first leg of the Copa del Rey semi-finals. The lone Barça goal was scored by Cesc Fàbregas.

On 31 January, Barcelona and Ajax agreed on the loan of forward Isaac Cuenca to the Dutch club until 30 June 2013. On the same day, Barça announced that defender Marc Muniesa will join the B team for the rest of the season after having recovered from a torn ACL.

=== February ===
On 3 February, Barcelona drew their second league match of the season and their second season match in a row. A 1–1 draw against Valencia at the Mestalla Stadium saw Messi scoring the only goal through a penalty. Xavi, who was substituted in injury time of the match, was diagnosed the following day with a hamstring injury and will be sidelined for 15 days. Barcelona faced Milan in the first leg of the Champions League round of 16 at the San Siro and lost 2–0, with goals coming from Kevin-Prince Boateng and Sulley Muntari.

On 21 February, Barcelona announced that defender Eric Abidal is fit to play for the first time since receiving a liver transplant in April 2012. On 24 February, Barcelona defeated Sevilla 2–1 at Camp Nou with goals from David Villa and Lionel Messi. On 26 February, Barcelona were defeated by Real Madrid 3–1, 4–2 on aggregate, at the Camp Nou and were knocked out of Copa del Rey contention.

=== March ===
On 2 March, Barcelona lost to Real Madrid at the Santiago Bernabéu by a score of 2–1. This was Barcelona's second loss against Real Madrid in a week. Four days later, Víctor Valdés was handed a four-match league ban after receiving a double yellow card for verbally abusing a referee following his team's defeat in the Clásico in the weekend fixture.

On 9 March, Barcelona defeated Deportivo de La Coruña 2–0 with goals from Alexis Sánchez and Lionel Messi. On 12 March, Barcelona defeated Milan 4–0, 4–2 on aggregate, and entered the quarter-finals of the Champions League with goals from David Villa, Jordi Alba and a brace from Lionel Messi. On 17 March, Barcelona defeated Rayo Vallecano 3–1 at Camp Nou with Messi scoring two and Villa scoring one goal. On 30 March, Barça drew 2–2 with Celta de Vigo with Messi and Cristian Tello scoring one goal each.

=== April ===
On 2 April, Barça drew 2–2 against Paris Saint-Germain in France in the first leg of the Champions League quarter-final, the goals coming from Messi and Xavi via a penalty.

On 10 April, Barça drew 1–1 against PSG at home in the Camp Nou in the Champions League quarter-final second leg. Pedro scored the all-important equaliser, which put Barça through to the semi-finals on the away goals rule. The draw for the semi-finals of the Champions League was held on 12 April, with Barça drawing with Bayern Munich.

On 14 April, Barcelona defeated Zarozoga 3–0 away from home. A 1–0 win over Levante on 20 April means that Barcelona need a maximum of six more points to secure the 2012–13 La Liga title.

On 23 April, Barcelona lost to Bayern 4–0 away at the Allianz Arena in Munich, their largest defeat in Europe in 16 years. On 1 May, in the second leg at home, they lost 3–0. With an aggregate score of 7–0, they were knocked out of the Champions League in the semi-finals.

=== May ===
On 5 May, Barcelona defeated Real Betis 4–2 at home with two goals by Lionel Messi and one each by David Villa and Alexis Sánchez with one more win to secure the La Liga title.

On 11 May, Barcelona clinched their 22nd La Liga title after Real Madrid's draw against Espanyol at the Cornellà-El Prat. The result gave Barcelona an eight-point lead with two matches remaining, which ensured that they would finish top of the table. Barcelona were at the top of the league table for the entirety of the season, and only lost two matches en route to winning the title. It was the first title for manager Vilanova.

On 30 May, French defender Eric Abidal called a press conference to announce his departure from the club after six seasons. Although admitting he wanted to see out his career as a Barça player, the club ultimately decided not to renew his contract.

== Players ==
=== Squad information ===
N	Pos.	Nat.	Name	Age	EU	Since	App	Goals	Ends	Transfer fee	Notes
1	GK	(Spain)	Víctor Valdés (4th captain)	31	EU	2002	535	0	2018	Youth system	From Youth system
2	RB	(Brazil)	Dani Alves	30	EU	2008	255	16	2015	€32M	Second nationality: Spain
3	CB	(Spain)	Gerard Piqué	26	EU	2008	227	16	2015	€5M	From Youth system
4	CM	(Spain)	Cesc Fàbregas	26	EU	2011	96	29	2016	€34M	From Youth system
5	CB	(Spain)	Carles Puyol (captain)	35	EU	1999	581	16	2016	Youth system	
6	CM	(Spain)	Xavi (vice-captain)	33	EU	1998	677	80	2016	Youth system	
7	FW	(Spain)	David Villa	31	EU	2012	77	33	2016	€40M	
8	CM	(Spain)	Andrés Iniesta (3rd captain)	29	EU	2002	455	47	2015	Youth system	
9	FW	(Chile)	Alexis Sánchez	24	Non-EU	2011	87	26	2016	€26M	
10	FW	(Argentina)	Lionel Messi (5th captain)	25	Non-EU	2004	379	313	2018	Youth system	Second nationality: Spain
11	CM	(Spain)	Thiago	22	EU	2009	101	11	2015	Youth system	
12	CM	(Mexico)	Jonathan dos Santos	23	EU	2009	25	0	2015	Youth system	Second nationality: Spain
13	GK	(Spain)	José Manuel Pinto	37	EU	2008	64	0	2014	€0.5M	
14	CB	(Argentina)	Javier Mascherano	28	EU	2010	138	0	2016	€22M	Second nationality: Italy
15	CB	(Spain)	Marc Bartra	22	EU	2010	24	1	2015	Youth system	
16	CM	(Spain)	Sergio Busquets	24	EU	2008	236	8	2015	Youth system	
17	FW	(Spain)	Pedro	25	EU	2008	214	68	2016	Youth system	
18	LB	(Spain)	Jordi Alba	24	EU	2012	44	5	2017	€14M	From Youth system
19	RB	(Spain)	Martín Montoya	22	EU	2011	36	2	2014	Youth system	
21	LB	(Brazil)	Adriano	28	EU	2010	105	10	2017	€9.5M	Second nationality: Spain
22	LB	(France)	Eric Abidal	33	EU	2007	193	2	2013	€9M	
25	CM	(Cameroon)	Alex Song	25	EU	2012	34	1	2017	€19M	Second nationality: France
37	FW	(Spain)	Cristian Tello	21	EU	2011	56	15	2016	Youth system	

- Last updated: 1 June 2013
- Source: FCBarcelona.com, Players in / out, Wikipedia players' articles, ESPN (for appearances and goals) and footballdatabase.com (for EU passport)

=== From the youth system ===
Note: Flags indicate national team as defined under FIFA eligibility rules; some limited exceptions apply. Players may hold more than one non-FIFA nationality.

No.	Pos.	Nation	Player
26	DF	ESP	Marc Muniesa
27	FW	ESP	Gerard Deulofeu
28	MF	ESP	Sergi Roberto
29	DF	ESP	Carles Planas

No.	Pos.	Nation	Player
30	MF	BRA	Rafinha
31	GK	ESP	Oier
32	GK	ESP	Jordi Masip
33	DF	ESP	Sergi Gómez

=== Transfers in ===
No.	Pos.	Nat.	Name	Age	EU	Moving from	Type	Transfer window	Ends	Transfer fee	Source
18	DF	(Spain)	Jordi Alba	23	EU	Valencia	Transfer	Summer	2017	€14M	FCBarcelona.com
25	DM	(Cameroon)	Alex Song	24	EU	Arsenal (England)	Transfer	Summer	2017	€19M	FCBarcelona.com

Total spending: ▼€33 million

=== Transfers out ===
No.	Pos.	Nat.	Name	Age	EU	Moving to	Type	Transfer window	Transfer fee	Source
15	MF	(Mali)	Seydou Keita	32	EU	Dalian Aerbin (China)	End of contract	Summer	Free	FCBarcelona.com
20	FW	(Netherlands)	Ibrahim Afellay	26	EU	Schalke 04 (Germany)	Loan	Summer	N/A	FCBarcelona.com
24	CB	(Spain)	Andreu Fontàs	22	EU	Mallorca	Loan	Summer	N/A	FCBarcelona.com
–	FW	(Brazil)	Keirrison	23	Non-EU	Coritiba (Brazil)	Loan	Summer	Free	FCBarcelona.com
–	DF	(Brazil)	Henrique	25	Non-EU	Palmeiras (Brazil)	Contract termination	Summer	Free	FCBarcelona.com
23	FW	(Spain)	Isaac Cuenca	21	EU	Ajax (Netherlands)	Loan	Winter	N/A	FCBarcelona.com

Total income: ▲€0

Expenditure: ▼€33 million

== Club ==
=== Current technical staff ===
Position	Staff
First team head coach	Tito Vilanova
Assistant coach	Jordi Roura
Goalkeeping coach	José Ramón de la Fuente
Physical fitness coach	Aureli Altimira
Director of football	Andoni Zubizarreta

Last updated: 15 June
Source: FC Barcelona Official Website

== Statistics ==
=== Player statistics ===
				Total				Champions League		La Liga		Copa del Rey		Others^{1}		
N	Pos.	Name	Nat.	GS	App	Gls	Min	App	Gls	App	Gls	App	Gls	App	Gls	Notes
1	GK	Valdés	(Spain)	44	44		3960	11		31				2		
13	GK	Pinto	(Spain)	16	16		1440	1		7		8				
2	RB	Alves	(Brazil)	43	44	1	3754	10	1	27		6		1		
3	CB	Piqué	(Spain)	41	44	3	3625	10		28	2	4	1	2		
5	CB	Puyol	(Spain)	20	22	2	1627	4		13	1	5	1			Source
15	CB	Bartra	(Spain)	8	15		904	6		7		2				
18	LB	Alba	(Spain)	41	44	5	3757	9	2	29	2	4	1	2		
19	RB	Montoya	(Spain)	16	22		1683	3		13		5		1		
21	FB	Adriano	(Brazil)	27	32	6	2115	6		21	5	3	1	2		
22	LB	Abidal	(France)	2	4		184			4						
26	CB	Muniesa	(Spain)													
29	LB	Planas	(Spain)		2		108	1				1				
4	CM	Fàbregas	(Spain)	41	44	13	3235	8	1	28	10	7	2	1		
6	CM	Xavi	(Spain)	41	43	7	3667	11	1	25	5	5		2	1	
8	CM	Iniesta	(Spain)	40	42	5	3509	10	1	25	2	5	2	2		
11	CM	Thiago	(Spain)	20	32	3	1907	2		23	2	7	1			
12	CM	Jonathan	(Mexico)	1	5		184			2		3				
14	DM	Mascherano	(Argentina)	36	38		3264	8		22		6		2		
16	DM	Busquets	(Spain)	39	41	1	3454	8		27	1	4		2		
25	DM	Song	(Cameroon)	25	28	1	2398	7		15	1	5		1		
28	CM	Roberto	(Spain)	4	5		331	1		1		3				
30	CM	Rafinha	(Brazil)	1	1		57	1								
7	SS	Villa	(Spain)	26	38	14	2265	10	1	23	8	5	5			
9	SS	Sánchez	(Chile)	28	42	8	2626	9	1	25	5	6	2	2		
10	SS	Messi	(Argentina)	44	50	60	4096	11	8	32	46	5	4	2	2	
17	SS	Pedro	(Spain)	39	42	8	3406	10	1	25	5	5	1	2	1	
27	SS	Deulofeu	(Spain)		2		24	1				1				
37	SS	Tello	(Spain)	16	30	8	1633	4	1	18	7	6		2		

Last updated: 1 May 2013
Source: Competitive matches, Other matches, 2012–13 Stats
Ordered by position in ascending shirt number.
0 shown as blank
^{1} Other Competitions: Supercopa de España

Note: The Time Played is not updated yet.

=== Goal scorers ===
No.	Pos.	Nation	Name	La Liga	UEFA Champions League	Copa del Rey	Supercopa de España	Total
10	FW	(Argentina)	Messi	46	8	4	2	60
7	FW	(Spain)	Villa	10	1	5	0	16
4	MF	(Spain)	Fàbregas	11	1	2	0	14
9	FW	(Chile)	Sánchez	8	1	2	0	11
17	FW	(Spain)	Pedro	7	1	1	1	10
37	FW	(Spain)	Tello	7	1	0	0	8
6	MF	(Spain)	Xavi	5	1	0	1	7
21	DF	(Brazil)	Adriano	5	0	1	0	6
8	MF	(Spain)	Iniesta	3	1	2	0	6
18	DF	(Spain)	Alba	2	2	1	0	5
3	DF	(Spain)	Piqué	2	0	1	0	3
11	MF	(Spain)	Thiago	2	0	1	0	3
5	DF	(Spain)	Puyol	1	0	1	0	2
2	DF	(Brazil)	Alves	0	1	0	0	1
16	MF	(Spain)	Busquets	1	0	0	0	1
19	DF	(Spain)	Montoya	1	0	0	0	1
25	MF	(Cameroon)	Song	1	0	0	0	1
TOTAL				112	18	21	4	155

Last updated: 26 May 2013

=== Disciplinary record ===
Includes all competitive matches. Players listed below made at least one appearance for Barcelona first squad during the season.

N	P	Nat.	Name	League			Europe			Cup			Supercopa			Total			Notes
N	P	Nat.	Name	Yellow card	Second yellow card	Red card	Yellow card	Second yellow card	Red card	Yellow card	Second yellow card	Red card	Yellow card	Second yellow card	Red card	Yellow card	Second yellow card	Red card	Notes
1	GK	(Spain)	V. Valdés	1		1										1		1	
2	DF	(Brazil)	Dani Alves	2			2			2						6			
3	DF	(Spain)	Piqué	4	1		3			2			1			10	1		
4	MF	(Spain)	Fàbregas	5			1			2						8			
5	DF	(Spain)	Puyol	3						2						5			
6	MF	(Spain)	Xavi																
7	FW	(Spain)	David Villa	1												1			
8	MF	(Spain)	A. Iniesta	3			1									4			
9	FW	(Chile)	Alexis	3			1			1						5			
10	FW	(Argentina)	Messi	1						1						2			
11	MF	(Spain)	Thiago	4												4			
12	MF	(Mexico)	Jonathan																
13	GK	(Spain)	Pinto	1												1			
14	MF	(Argentina)	Mascherano	2	1		3			2			2			9	1		
15	DF	(Spain)	Bartra	1			1									2			
16	MF	(Spain)	Sergio	9			1		1	1						11		1	
17	FW	(Spain)	Pedro	3			3									6			
18	DF	(Spain)	Jordi Alba	3			3			1						7			
19	DF	(Spain)	Montoya							1						1			
21	DF	(Brazil)	Adriano	3			3								1	6		1	
22	DF	(France)	Abidal																
25	MF	(Cameroon)	A. Song	3			2									5			
27	FW	(Spain)	Deulofeu																
28	MF	(Spain)	S. Roberto																
29	DF	(Spain)	Planas																
30	MF	(Spain)	Rafinha				1									1			
37	FW	(Spain)	Tello																

Last updated: 5 May 2013
Source: Competitive matches
Ordered by (red card) , (second yellow card) and (yellow card)
(yellow card) = Number of bookings; (second yellow card) = Number of sending offs after a second yellow card; (red card) = Number of sending offs by a direct red card.

=== Fair Play award ===
This award is given annually since 1999 to the team with the best fair play during the season. This ranking takes into account aspects such as cards, suspension of matches, audience behaviour and other penalties. This section not only aims to determine the best fair play, but also serves to break the tie in teams that are tied in all the other rules: points, head-to-head, goal difference and goals scored.

Rank	Team	Games	Yellow card	Double Yellow Card/Ejection	Direct Red Card	Games of Suspension (Player, only when +3)	Games of Suspension (Club's Personnel)	Audience Behaviour		Total Points
1	Barcelona	34	52	2	0	4^{26}	2^{2}	–	–	70
2	Valladolid	34	70	3	0	–	1^{5}	–	–	81
3	Real Sociedad	34	85	1	0	–	1^{8}	–	–	92

Source: La Liga Fair Play Award Standings
Last updated: 9 May 2013

== Pre-season and friendlies ==
Win Draw Loss

24 July 2012 HSV 125th Anniversary	Hamburger SV	1–2	Barcelona	Hamburg, Germany
18:00 CEST	Arslan 20'	Report	Dani Alves 5'; Deulofeu 38'	Stadium: Imtech Arena; Attendance: 57,274; Referee: Peter Gagelmann (Germany)

28 July 2012 Summer Tour	Raja Casablanca	0–8	Barcelona	Tangier, Morocco
23:59 CEST		Report	Sánchez 12', 40'; Messi 34', 37', 45'; Dani Alves 58' (pen.); Gómez 87'; Deulofeu 89'	Stadium: Stade de Tanger; Attendance: 23,000; Referee: Redouane Jiyed (Morocco)

4 August 2012 Tournoi de Paris	Paris Saint-Germain	2–2 (1–4 p)	Barcelona	Paris, France
19:45 CEST	Ibrahimović 60' (pen.); Camara 82'	Report	Rafinha 6'; Messi 54' (pen.)	Stadium: Parc des Princes; Attendance: 48,712; Referee: Saïd Ennjimi (France)
	Penalties
	Hoarau (penalty missed) Gameiro (penalty missed) Armand (penalty scored)		(penalty scored) Messi (penalty scored) Xavi (penalty scored) Fàbregas (penalty scored) Piqué

8 August 2012 Super Matchen	Barcelona	0–0 (2–0 p)	Manchester United	Gothenburg, Sweden
20:00 CEST		Report		Stadium: Ullevi; Attendance: 47,141; Referee: Martin Balko (Slovakia)
	Penalties
	Xavi (penalty scored); Piqué (penalty scored)		(penalty missed) Nani; (penalty missed) Young
Note: Shoot-out was three penalties per team instead of five.

11 August 2012 Summer of Champions' Cup	Dinamo București	0–2	Barcelona	Bucharest, Romania
19:45 CEST		Report	Messi 4'; Afellay 90+2'	Stadium: Arena Națională; Attendance: 45,000; Referee: Cristi Balaj (Romania)

20 August 2012 Joan Gamper Trophy	Barcelona	0–1	Sampdoria	Barcelona, Spain
22:00 CEST		Report	Soriano 1'	Stadium: Camp Nou; Attendance: 55,498; Referee: Fernando Teixeira Vitienes (Spain)

== Competitions ==
=== Overall ===
Competition	Started round	Final position / round	First match	Last match
Supercopa de España	Final	Runners-up	23 August 2012	29 August 2012
La Liga	—	1st	19 August 2012	1 June 2013
Copa del Rey	Round of 32	Semi-finals	30 October 2012	26 February 2013
UEFA Champions League	Group stage	Semi-finals	19 September 2012	1 May 2013

Updated to match played 11 May 2013
Source: Competitions

=== Supercopa de España ===
23 August 2012 First leg	Barcelona	3–2	Real Madrid	Barcelona
22:30 CEST	Pedro 56'; Messi 69' (pen.); Xavi 77'; Mascherano (yellow card) 45'; Piqué (yellow card) 49'	Report	Ronaldo 54'; Di María 84'; Alonso (yellow card) 11'; Arbeloa (yellow card) 44'; R. Albiol (yellow card) 50'	Stadium: Camp Nou; Attendance: 91,728; Referee: Clos Gómez (Aragon)
Note: Barcelona head coach Tito Vilanova, Real Madrid head coach José Mourinho, Mesut Özil, Marcelo, and David Villa were originally suspended for this match but were all pardoned by the RFEF president Ángel María Villar.

29 August 2012 Second leg	Real Madrid	2–1 (4a–4 agg.)	Barcelona	Madrid
22:30 CEST	Higuaín 11'; Ronaldo 19'; Pepe (yellow card) 20'; Arbeloa (yellow card) 38'; Khedira (yellow card) 63'; Ramos (yellow card) 72'	Report	Messi 45'; Mascherano (yellow card) 14'; Adriano (red card) 28'; Piqué (yellow card) 50'	Stadium: Santiago Bernabéu; Attendance: 78,000; Referee: Antonio Mateu Lahoz (Valencian Community)

=== La Liga ===
==== League table ====
Pos	Team	Pld	W	D	L	GF	GA	GD	Pts	Qualification or relegation
1	Barcelona (C)	38	32	4	2	115	40	+75	100	Qualification for the Champions League group stage
2	Real Madrid	38	26	7	5	103	42	+61	85	Qualification for the Champions League group stage
3	Atlético Madrid	38	23	7	8	65	31	+34	76	Qualification for the Champions League group stage
4	Real Sociedad	38	18	12	8	70	49	+21	66	Qualification for the Champions League play-off round
5	Valencia	38	19	8	11	67	54	+13	65	Qualification for the Europa League group stage (Note: Since the 2012–13 Copa del Rey champions Atlético Madrid and runners-up Real Madrid qualified for the 2013–14 UEFA Champions League, the 5th, 6th and 7th placed teams qualified for the group stage, play-off round, and third qualifying round of the 2013–14 UEFA Europa League respectively.)

Source: La Liga
Rules for classification: 1st points; 2nd head-to-head points; 3rd head-to-head goal difference; 4th goal difference; 5th number of goals scored; 7th Fair-play points
(C) Champions

==== Results summary ====
Overall								Home						Away					
Pld	W	D	L	GF	GA	GD	Pts	W	D	L	GF	GA	GD	W	D	L	GF	GA	GD
38	32	4	2	115	40	+75	100	18	1	0	63	15	+48	14	3	2	52	25	+27

Last updated: 26 May 2013.
Source: Competitive matches

==== Results by round ====
Round	1	2	3	4	5	6	7	8	9	10	11	12	13	14	15	16	17	18	19	20	21	22	23	24	25	26	27	28	29	30	31	32	33	34	35	36	37	38
Ground	H	A	H	A	H	A	H	A	A	H	A	H	A	H	A	H	A	H	A	A	H	A	H	A	H	A	H	H	A	H	A	H	A	H	A	H	A	H
Result	W	W	W	W	W	W	D	W	W	W	W	W	W	W	W	W	W	W	W	L	W	D	W	W	W	L	W	W	D	W	W	W	D	W	W	W	W	W
Position	1	1	1	1	1	1	1	1	1	1	1	1	1	1	1	1	1	1	1	1	1	1	1	1	1	1	1	1	1	1	1	1	1	1	1	1	1	1

Source: Competitive matches
A = Away; H = Home; W = Win; D = Draw; L = Loss

==== Matches ====
19 August 2012 1	Barcelona	5–1	Real Sociedad	Barcelona
21:00 CEST (UTC+02:00)	Puyol 4'; Messi 11', 16'; Pedro 41'; Villa 84'; Mascherano (yellow card) 38'; Villa (yellow card) 84'	Report	Castro 9'; Prieto (yellow card) 34' de la Bella (yellow card) 70'; Ansotegi (yellow card) 82'	Stadium: Camp Nou; Attendance: 57,721; Referee: González González (Castille and León)

26 August 2012 2	Osasuna	1–2	Barcelona	Pamplona
19:00 CEST (UTC+02:00)	Llorente 17'; Sisi (yellow card) 27'; Arribas (yellow card) 34'; Damià (yellow card) 37'; Loe (yellow card) 48'; Flaño (yellow card) 52'; Puñal (red card) 77'; Lamah (yellow card) 79'; Lolo (yellow card) 86'	Report	Messi 76', 80'; Busquets (yellow card) 35'; Piqué (yellow card) 78'; Puyol (yellow card) 82'	Stadium: El Sadar; Attendance: 15,691; Referee: Muñiz Fernández (Asturias)

2 September 2012 3	Barcelona	1–0	Valencia	Barcelona
21:30 CEST (UTC+02:00)	Adriano 23'; Piqué (yellow card) 16'	Report	Guardado (yellow card) 19'; Albelda (yellow card) 64'; Rami (yellow card) 88'	Stadium: Camp Nou; Attendance: 76,352; Referee: Pérez Lasa (Basque Country)

15 September 2012 4	Getafe	1–4	Barcelona	Getafe
20:00 CEST (UTC+02:00)	Mascherano 80' (o.g.); Michel (yellow card) 61'; Valera (yellow card) 62'	Report	Adriano 32'; Messi 74' (pen.), 78'; Villa 90+1'; Busquets (yellow card) 23'; Piqué (yellow card) 38'	Stadium: Alfonso Pérez; Attendance: 13,000; Referee: F. Teixeira Vitienes (Cantabria)

22 September 2012 5	Barcelona	2–0	Granada	Barcelona
22:00 CEST (UTC+02:00)	Xavi 87'; Gómez 90+2' (o.g.)	Report	Floro Flores (yellow card) 24'; Toño Martínez (yellow card) 45'; Gómez (yellow card) 72'	Stadium: Camp Nou; Attendance: 65,834; Referee: Del Cerro Grande (Community of Madrid)

29 September 2012 6	Sevilla	2–3	Barcelona	Seville
22:00 CEST (UTC+02:00)	Trochowski 27'; Negredo 48'; Rakitić (yellow card) 28'; Medel (red card) 72'; Botía (yellow card) 90+5'	Report	Fàbregas 53', 89'; Villa 90+3'; Busquets (yellow card) 70'; Pedro (yellow card) 74'	Stadium: Ramón Sánchez Pizjuán; Attendance: 44,800; Referee: Mateu Lahoz (Valencian Community)

7 October 2012 7	Barcelona	2–2	Real Madrid	Barcelona
19:50 CEST (UTC+02:00)	Messi 31', 60'; Pedro (yellow card) 39'; Busquets (yellow card) 54'	Report	Ronaldo 23', 66'; Alonso (yellow card) 43'; Özil (yellow card) 56'; Pepe (yellow card) 78'; Arbeloa (yellow card) 89'	Stadium: Camp Nou; Attendance: 96,589; Referee: Delgado Ferreiro (Basque Country)

20 October 2012 8	Deportivo La Coruña	4–5	Barcelona	A Coruña
22:00 CEST (UTC+02:00)	Pizzi 26' (pen.), 47'; Bergantiños 37'; Alba 79' (o.g.); Pizzi (yellow card) 40'; Ayoze (yellow card) 52'; Valerón (yellow card) 57'; Laure (yellow card) 60'	Report	Alba 3'; Tello 8'; Messi 18', 43', 77'; Mascherano (yellow card) 21' (yellow-red card) 49'; Iniesta (yellow card) 39'; Fàbregas (yellow card) 77'; Messi (yellow card) 85'	Stadium: Riazor; Attendance: 32,000; Referee: Paradas Romero (Andalusia)

27 October 2012 9	Rayo Vallecano	0–5	Barcelona	Madrid
22:00 CEST (UTC+02:00)	Delibašić (yellow card) 26'; Rodri (yellow card) 27'; José Carlos (yellow card) 39'; Amat (yellow card) 70'; Domínguez (yellow card) 71'	Report	Villa 20'; Messi 48', 89'; Xavi 78'; Fàbregas 80'; Alba (yellow card) 5'	Stadium: Campo de Vallecas; Attendance: 14,000; Referee: Pérez Lasa (Basque Country)

3 November 2012 10	Barcelona	3–1	Celta Vigo	Barcelona
18:00 CET (UTC+01:00)	Adriano 21'; Villa 26'; Alba 61'; Bartra (yellow card) 73'	Report	Bermejo 24'; Iago Aspas (yellow card) 62'; Oubiña (yellow card) 72'	Stadium: Camp Nou; Attendance: 82,978; Referee: Fernández Borbalán (Andalusia)

11 November 2012 11	Mallorca	2–4	Barcelona	Palma
17:50 CET (UTC+01:00)	Pereira 55'; Víctor 58' (pen.); Martí (yellow card) 27'	Report	Xavi 28'; Messi 44', 70'; Tello 45'; Busquets (yellow card) 57'	Stadium: Iberostar; Attendance: 23,142; Referee: Iglesias Villanueva (Galicia)

17 November 2012 12	Barcelona	3–1	Zaragoza	Barcelona
20:00 CET (UTC+01:00)	Messi 16', 60'; Song 28'	Report	Montañés 24'; Zuculini (yellow card) 48'	Stadium: Camp Nou; Attendance: 73,428; Referee: Ayza Gámez (Valencian Community)

25 November 2012 13	Levante	0–4	Barcelona	Valencia
21:00 CET (UTC+01:00)		Report	Messi 47', 52'; Iniesta 57'; Fàbregas 63'; Fàbregas (yellow card) 74'; Puyol (yellow card) 86'	Stadium: Ciutat de València; Attendance: 24,234; Referee: Pérez Montero (Andalusia)

1 December 2012 14	Barcelona	5–1	Athletic Bilbao	Barcelona
20:00 CET (UTC+01:00)	Piqué 22'; Messi 25', 70'; Adriano 45+1'; Fàbregas 57'; Busquets (yellow card) 26'	Report	Ibai 65' de Marcos (yellow card) 34'; Iturraspe (yellow card) 55'; Herrera (yellow card) 90+2'	Stadium: Camp Nou; Attendance: 68,346; Referee: Mateu Lahoz (Valencian Community)

9 December 2012 15	Real Betis	1–2	Barcelona	Seville
21:00 CET (UTC+01:00)	Castro 39'; Campbell (yellow card) 37'; Vadillo (yellow card) 62'; Nacho (yellow card) 89'	Report	Messi 16', 25'; Alba (yellow card) 61'; Pedro (yellow card) 76'	Stadium: Benito Villamarín; Attendance: 46,157; Referee: Velasco Carballo (Community of Madrid)

16 December 2012 16	Barcelona	4–1	Atlético Madrid	Barcelona
21:00 CET (UTC+01:00)	Adriano 36'; Busquets 45'; Messi 57', 88'; Thiago (yellow card) 85'	Report	Falcao 31'; M. Suárez (yellow card) 47'	Stadium: Camp Nou; Attendance: 86,637; Referee: Pérez Lasa (Basque Country)

22 December 2012 17	Valladolid	1–3	Barcelona	Valladolid
18:00 CET (UTC+01:00)	Guerra 89'; Bueno (yellow card) 26'; Sereno (yellow card) 35'; Sastre (yellow card) 52'; Óscar (yellow card) 67'	Report	Xavi 43'; Messi 59'; Tello 90+4'; Thiago (yellow card) 40'	Stadium: José Zorrilla; Attendance: 24,823; Referee: Clos Gómez (Aragon)

6 January 2013 18	Barcelona	4–0	Espanyol	Barcelona
19:00 CET (UTC+01:00)	Xavi 10'; Pedro 16', 27'; Messi 29' (pen.)	Report	Casilla (yellow card) 28'; Baena (yellow card) 53'; Stuani (yellow card) 74'; Moreno (yellow card) 85'	Stadium: Camp Nou; Attendance: 73,760; Referee: Gil Manzano (Extremadura)

13 January 2013 19	Málaga	1–3	Barcelona	Málaga
21:00 CET (UTC+01:00)	Buonanotte 89'; Camacho (yellow card) 54'	Report	Messi 27'; Fàbregas 50'; Thiago 83'; Busquets (yellow card) 68'	Stadium: La Rosaleda; Attendance: 29,323; Referee: Delgado Ferreiro (Basque Country)

19 January 2013 20	Real Sociedad	3–2	Barcelona	San Sebastián
18:00 CET (UTC+01:00)	Castro 41'; Mascherano 62' (o.g.); Agirretxe 90+1'; I. Martínez (yellow card) 36'; Illarramendi (yellow card) 79'; Griezmann (yellow card) 90+3'	Report	Messi 7'; Pedro 25'; Piqué (yellow card) 33' (yellow-red card) 56'; A. Iniesta (yellow card) 58'; Busquets (yellow card) 74'	Stadium: Anoeta; Attendance: 32,076; Referee: Undiano Mallenco (Navarre)

27 January 2013 21	Barcelona	5–1	Osasuna	Barcelona
19:00 CET (UTC+01:00)	Messi 11', 28' (pen.), 56', 58'; Pedro 41'; Adriano (yellow card) 13'	Report	Loé 24'; Arribas (yellow card) 18' (yellow-red card) 27'; Oier (yellow card) 51'	Stadium: Camp Nou; Attendance: 65,594; Referee: Teixeira Vitienes (Cantabria)

3 February 2013 22	Valencia	1–1	Barcelona	Valencia
19:00 CET (UTC+01:00)	Banega 34'; Cissokho (yellow card) 40'; Soldado (yellow card) 47'; A. Guardado (yellow card) 76'	Report	Messi 39' (pen.); Mascherano (yellow card) 23'	Stadium: Mestalla; Attendance: 45,000; Referee: González González (Castille and León)

10 February 2013 23	Barcelona	6–1	Getafe	Barcelona
12:00 CET (UTC+01:00)	Sánchez 6'; Messi 13'; Villa 58'; Tello 79'; Iniesta 90'; Piqué 90+2'; A. Song (yellow card) 58'	Report	Vázquez 83'; Lopo (yellow card) 39'; Diego Castro (yellow card) 42'	Stadium: Camp Nou; Attendance: 85,610; Referee: Iglesias Villanueva (Galicia)

16 February 2013 24	Granada	1–2	Barcelona	Granada
20:00 CET (UTC+01:00)	Ighalo 26'; Siqueira (yellow card) 34'; Nyom (yellow card) 69'	Report	Messi 50', 73'; Thiago (yellow card) 88'	Stadium: Nuevo Los Cármenes; Attendance: 21,300; Referee: Carlos del Cerro Grande (Community of Madrid)

23 February 2013 25	Barcelona	2–1	Sevilla	Barcelona
22:00 CET (UTC+01:00)	Villa 51'; Messi 59'	Report	Botía 41'; Navarro (yellow card) 33'; Botía (yellow card) 86'	Stadium: Camp Nou; Attendance: 57,629; Referee: Velasco Carballo (Community of Madrid)

2 March 2013 26	Real Madrid	2–1	Barcelona	Madrid
16:00 CET (UTC+01:00)	Benzema 6'; Ramos 82'; Ramos (yellow card) 51'; Coentrão (yellow card) 61'; Morata (yellow card) 68'; Arbeloa (yellow card) 90+2'	Report	Messi 18'; Alba (yellow card) 55'; Piqué (yellow card) 58'; Thiago (yellow card) 64'; Alves (yellow card) 90+1'; Iniesta (yellow card) 90+3'; Valdés (yellow card) 90+4' (red card) 90+4'	Stadium: Santiago Bernabéu; Attendance: 85,454; Referee: Pérez Lasa (Basque Country)

9 March 2013 27	Barcelona	2–0	Deportivo La Coruña	Barcelona
20:00 CET (UTC+01:00)	Sánchez 37'; Messi 87'; Puyol (yellow card) 70'; Song (yellow card) 83'	Report	Aguilar (yellow card) 70'	Stadium: Camp Nou; Attendance: 69,748; Referee: Pérez Montero (Andalusia)

17 March 2013 28	Barcelona	3–1	Rayo Vallecano	Barcelona
22:00 CET (UTC+01:00)	Villa 25'; Messi 40', 56'; Pinto (yellow card) 90+1'	Report	Tamudo 70'; Piti (yellow card) 18'; Trashorras (yellow card) 28'; Tito (yellow card) 63'; Rubén (yellow card) 68'	Stadium: Camp Nou; Attendance: 68,197; Referee: González González (Castille and León)

30 March 2013 29	Celta Vigo	2–2	Barcelona	Vigo
18:00 CET (UTC+01:00)	Insa 38'; Oubiña 88'; Cabral (yellow card) 32'; Oubiña (yellow card) 41'; Lago (yellow card) 62'; Augusto Fernández (yellow card) 87'	Report	Tello 43'; Messi 73'; Fàbregas (yellow card) 25'; Sánchez (yellow card) 64'; Busquets (yellow card) 88'	Stadium: Balaídos; Attendance: 29,000; Referee: Antonio Mateu Lahoz (Valencian Community)

6 April 2013 30	Barcelona	5–0	Mallorca	Barcelona
22:00 CEST (UTC+02:00)	Fàbregas 20', 37', 46'; Sánchez 22', 38'; Sánchez (yellow card) 75'	Report	Alfaro (yellow card) 64'	Stadium: Camp Nou; Attendance: 65,127; Referee: Muñiz Fernández (Asturias)

14 April 2013 31	Zaragoza	0–3	Barcelona	Zaragoza
19:00 CEST (UTC+02:00)	Movilla (yellow card) 23'; Apoño (yellow card) 53'; Á. González (yellow card) 82'	Report	Thiago 20'; Tello 39', 53'; Sánchez (yellow card) 71'; Alves (yellow card) 83'	Stadium: La Romareda; Attendance: 31,000; Referee: Fernández Borbalán (Andalusia)

20 April 2013 32	Barcelona	1–0	Levante	Barcelona
20:00 CEST (UTC+02:00)	Fàbregas 84'; A. Song (yellow card) 65'	Report	P. Diop (yellow card) 33'; Pedro López (yellow card) 89'	Stadium: Camp Nou; Attendance: 70,957; Referee: Undiano Mallenco (Navarre)

27 April 2013 33	Athletic Bilbao	2–2	Barcelona	Bilbao
18:00 CEST (UTC+02:00)	Susaeta 27'; Herrera 90'; Herrera (yellow card) 40'; Gurpegui (yellow card) 87'; De Marcos (yellow card) 90+3'	Report	Messi 67'; Sánchez 69'; Fàbregas (yellow card) 35'; Adriano (yellow card) 55'	Stadium: San Mamés; Referee: Iglesias Villanueva (Galicia)

5 May 2013 34	Barcelona	4–2	Real Betis	Barcelona
21:00 CEST (UTC+02:00)	Sánchez 9'; Villa 56'; Messi 60', 71'; Adriano (yellow card) 45'	Report	Pabón 2'; Pérez 43'; Pérez (yellow card) 54'	Stadium: Camp Nou; Attendance: 68,175; Referee: Clos Gómez (Aragon)

12 May 2013 35	Atlético Madrid	1–2	Barcelona	Madrid
19:00 CEST (UTC+02:00)	Falcao 51'; Insúa (yellow card) 90'	Report	Sánchez 72'; Gabi 80' (o.g.); Fàbregas (yellow card) 74'	Stadium: Vicente Calderón; Attendance: 54,851; Referee: Pérez Montero (Andalusia)

19 May 2013 36	Barcelona	2–1	Valladolid	Barcelona
21:00 CEST (UTC+02:00)	Pedro 21'; Valiente 41' (o.g.)	Report	Pérez 90' (pen.)	Stadium: Camp Nou; Attendance: 50,000; Referee: Iglesias Villanueva (Galicia)

26 May 2013 37	Espanyol	0–2	Barcelona	Cornellà de Llobregat
20:00 CEST (UTC+02:00)	Navarro (yellow card) 45'; Mubarak (yellow card) 81' (yellow-red card) 81'; Capdevila (yellow card) 81'; Forlín (yellow card) 88'	Report	Sánchez 14'; Pedro 87'; Iniesta (yellow card) 68'; Fàbregas (yellow card) 88'	Stadium: Cornellà-El Prat; Attendance: 40,500; Referee: Fernández Borbalán (Andalusia)

1 June 2013 38	Barcelona	4–1	Málaga	Barcelona
21:00 CEST (UTC+02:00)	Villa 3'; Fàbregas 14'; Montoya 16'; Iniesta 52'	Report	Morales 56'	Stadium: Camp Nou; Attendance: 65,727; Referee: Ayza Gámez (Valencian Community)

=== Copa del Rey ===
Kickoff times are in CET.

==== Round of 32 ====
30 October 2012 First leg	Alavés	0–3	Barcelona	Vitoria-Gasteiz
22:00 CET (UTC+01:00)	Guzmán (yellow card) 62'; Luismi (yellow card) 84'	Report	Villa 40'; Iniesta 51'; Fàbregas 88'; Fàbregas (yellow card) 83'	Stadium: Mendizorroza; Attendance: 19,840; Referee: J. A. Teixeira Vitienes (Cantabria)

28 November 2012 Second leg	Barcelona	3–1 (6–1 agg.)	Alavés	Barcelona
21:30 CET (UTC+01:00)	Adriano 35'; Villa 56', 59'	Report	Viguera 17'Jaume (yellow card) 10'; M. García (yellow card) 55'	Stadium: Camp Nou; Attendance: 57,655; Referee: Velasco Carballo (Community of Madrid)

==== Round of 16 ====
12 December 2012 First Leg	Córdoba	0–2	Barcelona	Córdoba
20:00 CET (UTC+01:00)	Dubarbier (yellow card) 34'; Fede (yellow card) 62'	Report	Messi 11', 74'	Stadium: Nuevo Arcángel; Attendance: 20,000; Referee: Del Cerro Grande (Community of Madrid)

10 January 2013 Second Leg	Barcelona	5–0 (7–0 agg.)	Córdoba	Barcelona
21:30 CET (UTC+01:00)	Thiago 17'; Villa 21', 26'; Sánchez 55', 85'; Mascherano (yellow card) 63'; Montoya (yellow card) 67'	Report		Stadium: Camp Nou; Attendance: 37,607; Referee: Hernández Hernández (Canary Islands)

==== Quarter-finals ====
16 January 2013 First leg	Barcelona	2–2	Málaga	Barcelona
21:30 CET (UTC+01:00)	Messi 29'; Puyol 30'; Alexis (yellow card) 10'; Messi (yellow card) 34'	Report	Iturra 25'; Camacho 89'; Eliseu (yellow card) 38'; Monreal (red card) 75'; Sergio Sánchez (yellow card) 82'	Stadium: Camp Nou; Attendance: 55,151; Referee: González González (Castile and León)

24 January 2013 Second leg	Málaga	2–4 (4–6 agg.)	Barcelona	Málaga
22:00 CET (UTC+01:00)	Joaquín 12'; Santa Cruz 68'; Iturra (yellow card) 14'; Eliseu (yellow card) 26'; Weligton (yellow card) 39'	Report	Pedro 8'; Piqué 49'; Iniesta 76'; Messi 80'; Busquets (yellow card) 32'; Alba (yellow card) 39'; Fàbregas (yellow card) 45+1'; Mascherano (yellow card) 68'; Dani Alves (yellow card) 82'	Stadium: La Rosaleda; Attendance: 27,099; Referee: Mateu Lahoz (Valencian Community)

==== Semi-finals ====
30 January 2013 First leg	Real Madrid	1–1	Barcelona	Madrid
21:00 CET (UTC+01:00)	Varane 82'; Carvalho (yellow card) 16'; Callejón (yellow card) 42'; Alonso (yellow card) 90'	Report	Fàbregas 50'; Piqué (yellow card) 1'; Dani Alves (yellow card) 72'; Puyol (yellow card) 85'	Stadium: Santiago Bernabéu; Attendance: 78,000; Referee: Clos Gómez (Aragon)
Note: Tito Vilanova missed the match due to health problems. Assistant coach Jordi Roura managed Barcelona in his place.

26 February 2013 Second leg	Barcelona	1–3 (2–4 agg.)	Real Madrid	Barcelona
21:00 CET (UTC+01:00)	Alba 89'; Piqué (yellow card) 12'; Puyol (yellow card) 40'	Report	Ronaldo 13' (pen.), 57'; Varane 68'; Arbeloa (yellow card) 37'	Stadium: Camp Nou; Attendance: 95,002; Referee: Undiano Mallenco (Navarre)
Note: Tito Vilanova missed the match due to health problems. Assistant coach Jordi Roura managed Barcelona in his place.

=== UEFA Champions League ===
==== Group stage ====
Pos	Team	Pld	W	D	L	GF	GA	GD	Pts	Qualification	BAR	CEL	BEN	SPM
1	(Spain) Barcelona	6	4	1	1	11	5	+6	13	Advance to knockout phase	—	2–1	0–0	3–2
2	(Scotland) Celtic	6	3	1	2	9	8	+1	10	Advance to knockout phase	2–1	—	0–0	2–1
3	(Portugal) Benfica	6	2	2	2	5	5	0	8	Transfer to Europa League	0–2	2–1	—	2–0
4	(Russia) Spartak Moscow	6	1	0	5	7	14	−7	3		0–3	2–3	2–1	—

Source: Soccerway

19 September 2012 1	Barcelona (Spain)	3–2	(Russia) Spartak Moscow	Barcelona, Spain
20:45 CEST	Tello 14'; Messi 71', 80'; A. Song (yellow card) 34'	Report	Dani Alves 29' (o.g.); Rômulo 58'; Kombarov (yellow card) 31'; Källström (yellow card) 42'; Emenike (yellow card) 44'; Suchý (yellow card) 77'	Stadium: Camp Nou; Attendance: 82,241; Referee: Milorad Mažić (Serbia)

2 October 2012 2	Benfica (Portugal)	0–2	(Spain) Barcelona	Lisbon, Portugal
20:45 CEST	Bruno César (yellow card) 38'; Matić (yellow card) 86'; Jardel (yellow card) 90'	Report	Sánchez 6'; Fàbregas 55'; Fàbregas (yellow card) 19'; Pedro (yellow card) 28'; Busquets (red card) 89'	Stadium: Estádio da Luz; Attendance: 63,847; Referee: Cüneyt Çakır (Turkey)

23 October 2012 3	Barcelona (Spain)	2–1	(Scotland) Celtic	Barcelona, Spain
20:45 CEST	Iniesta 45'; Alba 90+4'; Mascherano (yellow card) 71'; Adriano (yellow card) 80'	Report	Samaras 18'; Forrest (yellow card) 90+1'	Stadium: Camp Nou; Attendance: 77,781; Referee: Gianluca Rocchi (Italy)

7 November 2012 4	Celtic (Scotland)	2–1	(Spain) Barcelona	Glasgow, Scotland
20:45 CET	Wanyama 21'; Watt 83'; Miku (yellow card) 41'	Report	Messi 90+1'; Song (yellow card) 13'; Alba (yellow card) 65'	Stadium: Celtic Park; Attendance: 58,841; Referee: Björn Kuipers (Netherlands)

20 November 2012 5	Spartak Moscow (Russia)	0–3	(Spain) Barcelona	Moscow, Russia
18:00 CET	Rafa Carioca (yellow card) 62'; Källström (yellow card) 90+2'	Report	Dani Alves 16'; Messi 27', 39'; Pedro (yellow card) 36'; Mascherano (yellow card) 90'	Stadium: Luzhniki Stadium; Attendance: 67,325; Referee: Ivan Bebek (Croatia)

5 December 2012 6	Barcelona (Spain)	0–0	(Portugal) Benfica	Barcelona, Spain
20:45 CET	Rafinha (yellow card) 49'; Adriano (yellow card) 60'	Report	Nolito (yellow card) 43'; Garay (yellow card) 56'; Luisão (yellow card) 59'; Matić (yellow card) 78'	Stadium: Camp Nou; Attendance: 50,659; Referee: Svein Oddvar Moen (Norway)

==== Knockout phase ====
===== Round of 16 =====
20 February 2013 First leg	Milan (Italy)	2–0	(Spain) Barcelona	Milan, Italy
20:45 CET	Boateng 57'; Muntari 81'; Mexès (yellow card) 25'; Traoré (yellow card) 90'	Report	Busquets (yellow card) 60'; Piqué (yellow card) 67'	Stadium: San Siro; Attendance: 79,532; Referee: Craig Thomson (Scotland)

12 March 2013 Second leg	Barcelona (Spain)	4–0 (4–2 agg.)	(Italy) Milan	Barcelona, Spain
20:45 CET (UTC+01:00)	Messi 5', 40'; Villa 55'; Alba 90+2'; Pedro (yellow card) 41'	Report	Boateng (yellow card) 21'; Flamini (yellow card) 45'; Mexès (yellow card) 54'	Stadium: Camp Nou; Attendance: 94,944; Referee: Viktor Kassai (Hungary)

===== Quarter-finals =====
2 April 2013 First leg	Paris Saint-Germain (France)	2–2	(Spain) Barcelona	Paris, France
20:45 CEST	Ibrahimović 79'; Matuidi 90+4'; Beckham (yellow card) 65'; Matuidi (yellow card) 65'; Ibrahimović (yellow card) 87'; Sirigu (yellow card) 88'	Report	Messi 38'; Xavi 89' (pen.); Piqué (yellow card) 18'; Alba (yellow card) 62'; Mascherano (yellow card) 75'; Dani Alves (yellow card) 85'	Stadium: Parc des Princes; Attendance: 45,336; Referee: Wolfgang Stark (Germany)

10 April 2013 Second leg	Barcelona (Spain)	1–1 (3 (a) –3 agg.)	(France) Paris Saint-Germain	Barcelona, Spain
20:45 CEST	Pedro 71'; Adriano (yellow card) 42'	Report	Pastore 50'; Lavezzi (yellow card) 80'; Thiago Silva (yellow card) 86'; Beckham (yellow card) 89'	Stadium: Camp Nou; Attendance: 96,022; Referee: Björn Kuipers (Netherlands)
Note: 3–3 on aggregate, Barcelona won on away goals.

===== Semi-finals =====
23 April 2013 First leg	Bayern Munich (Germany)	4–0	(Spain) Barcelona	Munich, Germany
20:45 CEST	Müller 25', 82'; Gómez 49'; Robben 73'; Martínez (yellow card) 46'; Gómez (yellow card) 49'	Report	Sánchez (yellow card) 86'; Alba (yellow card) 89'; Iniesta (yellow card) 90+2'	Stadium: Allianz Arena; Attendance: 68,000; Referee: Viktor Kassai (Hungary)

1 May 2013 Second leg	Barcelona (Spain)	0–3 (0–7 agg.)	(Germany) Bayern Munich	Barcelona, Spain
20:45 CEST	Dani Alves (yellow card) 45+1'; Piqué (yellow card) 79'	Report	Robben 48'; Piqué 72' (o.g.); Müller 76'; Robben (yellow card) 32'	Stadium: Camp Nou; Attendance: 95,877; Referee: Damir Skomina (Slovenia)

=== Copa Catalunya ===
17 April 2013 Semi-finals	Gimnàstic	0–1	Barcelona	Tarragona
21:30		Report	Lombán 14' (pen.)	Stadium: Nou Estadi; Referee: Victor Manuel Sánchez Rico (Catalonia)

29 May 2013 Final	Espanyol	1–1 (2–4 p)	Barcelona	Lleida
21:30	Simão 19'	Report	Fàbregas 89'	Stadium: Camp d'Esports; Attendance: 12,620; Referee: Alfonso Álvarez Izquierdo (Catalonia)
	Penalties
	Mubarak (penalty scored) Petrov (penalty scored) Colotto (penalty missed) Verdú (penalty missed)		Xavi (penalty missed) Fàbregas (penalty scored) Piqué (penalty scored) Sánchez (penalty scored) Villa (penalty scored)
