= Cristian Tello =

Spanish footballer (born 1991)

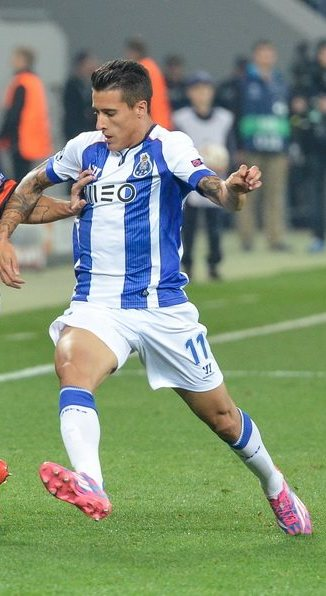
- Tello with Porto in 2014

Personal information
- Full name: Cristian Tello Herrera
- Date of birth: 11 August 1991 (age 35)
- Place of birth: Sabadell, Spain
- Height: 1.78 m (5 ft 10 in)
- Positions: Forward; winger

Youth career
- 1999–2002: Can Rull
- 2002–2008: Barcelona
- 2007–2008: → Damm (loan)
- 2008–2010: Espanyol

Senior career*
Years	Team	Apps	(Gls)
2010	Espanyol B	4	(1)
2010–2012	Barcelona B	39	(9)
2011–2017	Barcelona	59	(11)
2014–2016	→ Porto (loan)	36	(7)
2016–2017	→ Fiorentina (loan)	51	(6)
2017–2022	Betis	140	(17)
2022	Los Angeles FC	4	(0)
2023–2024	Al-Fateh	44	(15)
2024–2025	Al-Orobah	26	(5)
2025–2026	Palm City	4	(0)
Total		407	(71)

International career
2010	Spain U19	3	(0)
2011	Spain U20	5	(1)
2012–2013	Spain U21	12	(2)
2012	Spain U23	6	(0)
2013	Spain	1	(0)
2013–2022	Catalonia	3	(0)
Medal record
Men's football
Representing Spain
UEFA European Under-21 Championship
Winner	2013 Israel	Team
- * Club domestic league appearances and goals

Cristian Tello Herrera (Spanish pronunciation: [ˈkɾistjan ˈteʎo eˈreɾa]; born 11 August 1991) is a Spanish former professional footballer who played as a forward or winger.

He spent his youth at Espanyol and Barcelona, playing for both clubs' reserves before breaking through into the first team of the latter; he also spent one and a half seasons in Portugal with Porto and as many in Italy with Fiorentina, on loan. He returned to Spain with Betis in 2017, where he made 172 total appearances and scored 24 goals, winning the Copa del Rey in 2022. Following brief stints in the United States, Saudi Arabia and the United Arab Emirates, he retired in 2026.

Tello represented Spain at the 2012 Olympics, and was part of the under-21 squad which won the European Championship in 2013. He earned his only cap for the senior team the same year.

== Club career ==
=== Espanyol ===
Born in Sabadell, Barcelona, Catalonia, Tello started playing at the age of eight with CFU Can Rull. He moved to FC Barcelona shortly after, being loaned to another club in the region, CF Damm, for one year.

In 2008, Tello's contract expired and RCD Espanyol signed him. He made his senior debut in the 2009–10 season, playing four games with the B team and being relegated from Segunda División B.

=== Barcelona ===
In June 2010, Tello moved back to Barcelona Atlètic, who competed in the Segunda División. On 9 November 2011, he made his debut for Barça's main squad, playing the full 90 minutes in a 1–0 away win against L'Hospitalet in the round of 32 of the Copa del Rey; he scored a brace in the second leg, a 9–0 demolition.

Tello made his first La Liga appearance on 28 January 2012, coming on as a substitute for Adriano in the 75th minute of a 0–0 draw at Villarreal. The following weekend, in his first league start, he opened the score in the eighth minute of a 2–1 home victory over Real Sociedad after a through ball by Lionel Messi.

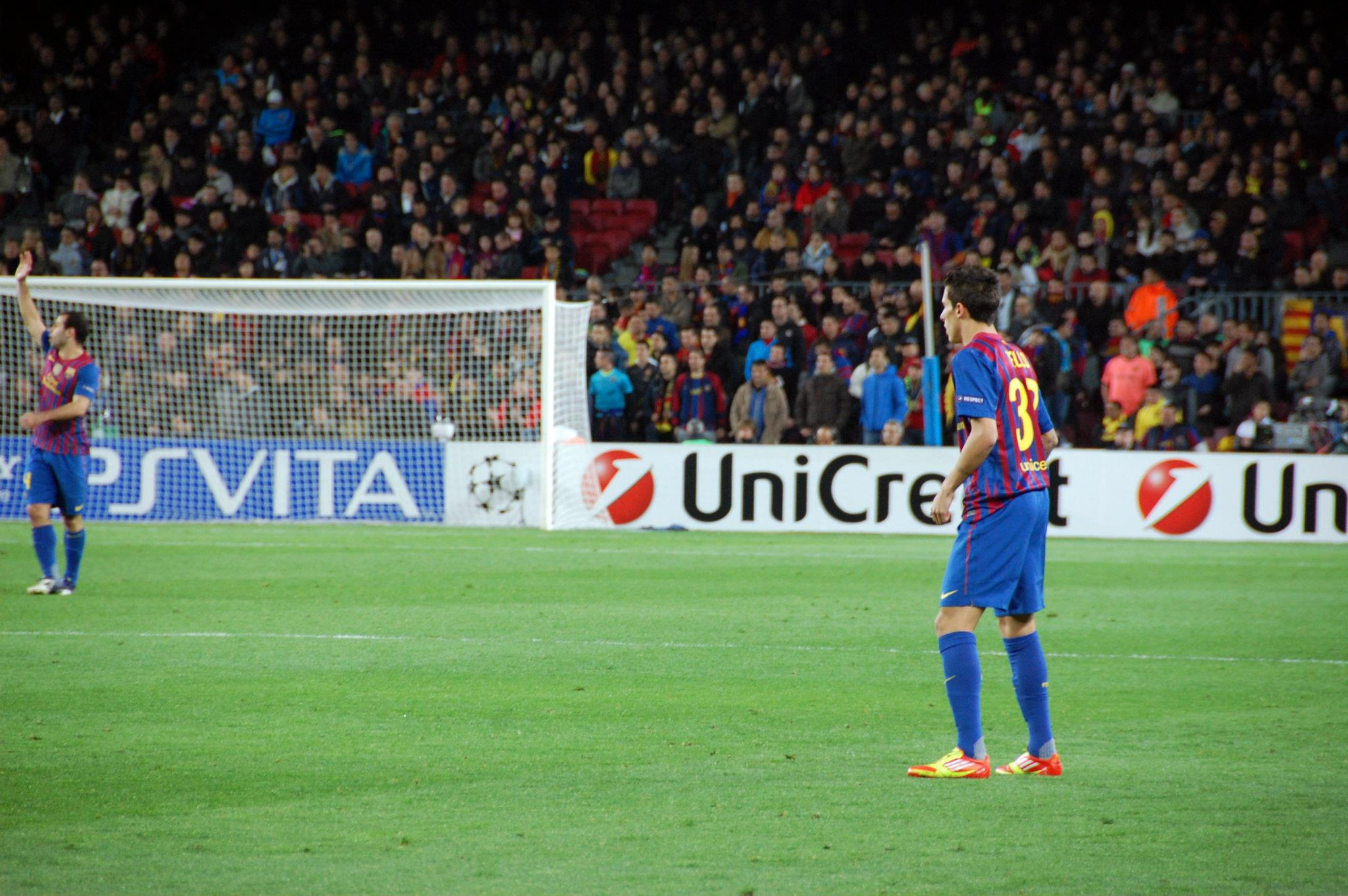
Tello in action for Barcelona in the 2011–12 Champions League

On 7 March 2012, Tello replaced Andrés Iniesta early into the second half of a match against Bayer 04 Leverkusen at the Camp Nou, taking his bow in the UEFA Champions League: he scored his first goal within two minutes, after Cesc Fàbregas played him through over the top and he ran from the halfway line to net from just inside the penalty area for the 4–0; six minutes later, from a similar position, he made it 6–0 for the hosts in an eventual 7–1 win (10–2 on aggregate).

Even though his future initially seemed uncertain, Tello managed to convince new manager Tito Vilanova and stayed in roster for the 2012–13 campaign, inclusively going on to start in several games. On 19 September 2012 he scored the opener and assisted Messi in the second goal, in a 3–2 home defeat of Spartak Moscow in the Champions League group stage, where he was also chosen as player of the match.

On 13 December 2012, Tello signed a new contract with Barcelona, keeping him with the Blaugrana until June 2016. Nine days later, he scored after only 30 seconds on the pitch in the last play of the 3–1 away win over Real Valladolid.

Tello fell further down the offensive pecking order in 2013–14, following the arrival of Neymar. He scored his first goal of the season on 11 December in a 6–1 home rout of Celtic in the Champions League group phase, and six days later he also found the net, in a 3–0 victory against Cartagena in the domestic cup (7–1 on aggregate). In the quarter-finals of the latter competition, away to Levante, he profited from three Messi assists to score his first hat-trick as a professional as his team won 4–1.

Tello was loaned to Porto of the Primeira Liga on 16 July 2014, in a two-year deal. He scored his first goal for the club on 25 November, entering as a substitute for Ricardo Quaresma and concluding a 3–0 win at BATE Borisov in the group stage of the Champions League. Five days later, he netted his first league goal, the opener in a 5–0 home win over Rio Ave. On 1 March 2015, he scored all of his side's goals as they beat Sporting CP 3–0.

On 22 January 2016, Barcelona and Fiorentina reached an agreement for the loan of Tello until 30 June 2016. He made his Serie A debut on 3 February, starting a 2–1 defeat of Carpi at the Stadio Artemio Franchi, and scored his first goal 18 days later in a 3–2 victory at Atalanta.

On 16 August 2016, Tello's loan was renewed for the upcoming season.

=== Betis ===
On 30 June 2017, Tello joined Real Betis on a five-year deal for €4 million. He made his debut from the bench on 25 August in a 2–1 home win over Celta de Vigo, and scored his first goal on 15 October as a consolation in a 6–3 loss to Valencia also at the Benito Villamarín. On 30 November, he netted twice in a 5–3 defeat to fellow Andalusians Cádiz in the last 32 of the domestic cup.

Tello scored four league goals in each of his first two seasons. In 2019–20 he rarely started under manager Rubi and was linked with January moves to Espanyol or Celta; he stayed and scored the late winner against Real Madrid on 8 March.

Tello scored five goals in 2020–21. On 22 May 2021, as the campaign ended with qualification for the UEFA Europa League via a 3–2 comeback win at Celta, he came on as a half-time substitute and received the first sending-off of his career for two yellow cards in as many minutes.

Tello contributed six appearances and one goal as his side won the 2021–22 Spanish Cup. This included nine minutes of the final against Valencia.

=== Los Angeles FC ===
Tello signed a three-year deal with Los Angeles FC on 26 August 2022, earning a $1.78 million salary. He made his Major League Soccer debut on 13 September as a substitute in a 1–1 draw at Minnesota United FC, as his team ended the season with the Supporters' Shield. In the championship game, he came on in extra time as LAFC defeated the Philadelphia Union in a penalty shoot-out for their first MLS Cup; he took and missed the first attempt.

=== Saudi Arabia ===
On 25 January 2023, Tello joined Al Fateh SC on an 18-month contract. In August 2024, he agreed to a two-year deal at fellow Saudi Pro League club Al-Orobah FC.

=== Palm City ===
In October 2025, Tello moved to UAE Second Division League side Palm City FC. The following September, the 35-year-old announced his retirement.

== International career ==
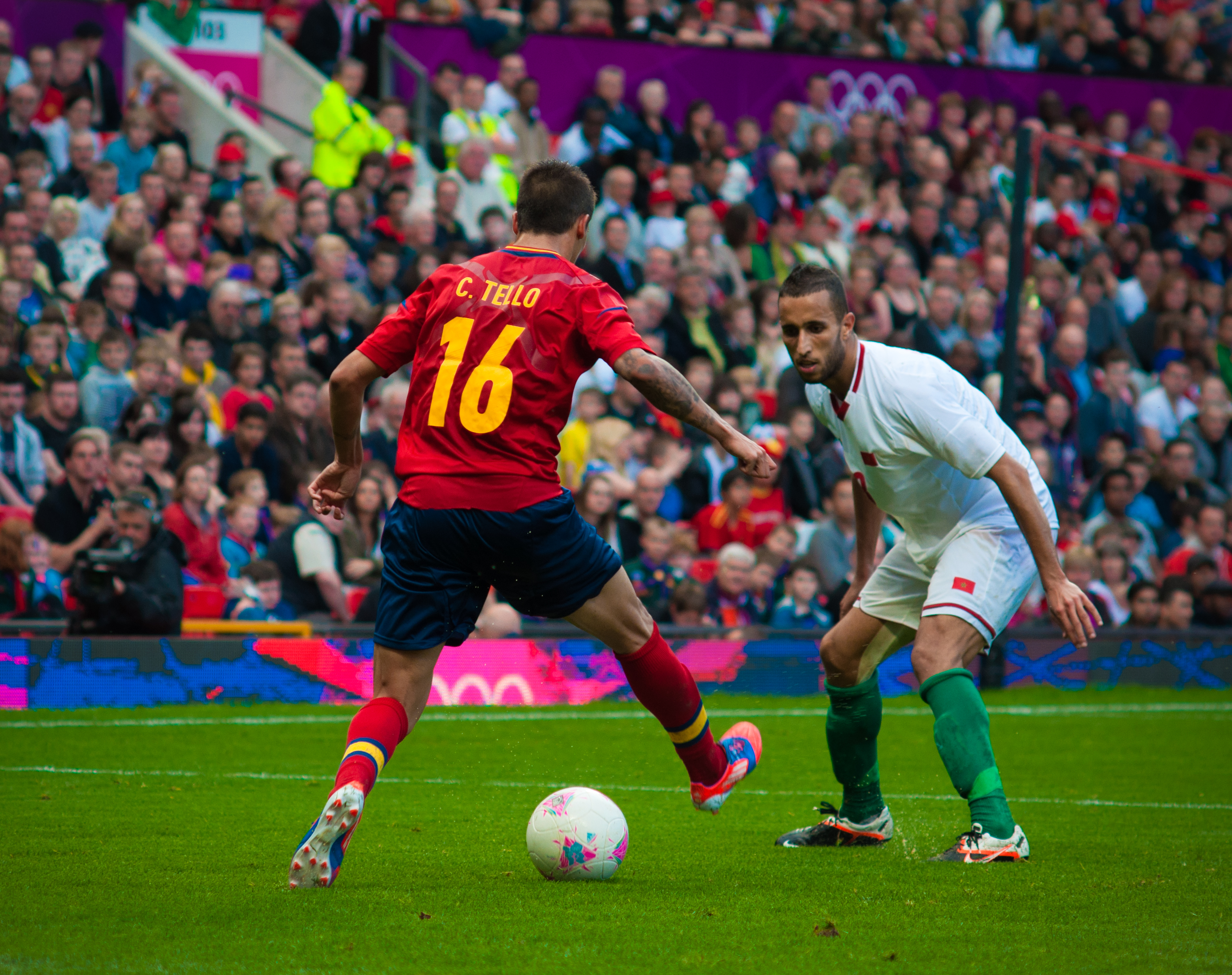
Tello playing for Spain at the 2012 Olympics

Tello was a member of the Spanish squad that participated in the 2012 Summer Olympics in London, playing all three games in an eventual group stage exit. He made his only appearance with the senior side on 14 August 2013, starting in a 2–0 friendly win in Ecuador.

Tello also represented the unofficial Catalonia team, making his debut on 2 January 2013 in a 1–1 draw with Nigeria.

== Career statistics ==
=== Club ===
Appearances and goals by club, season and competition
Club	Season	League			National cup (Note: Includes Copa del Rey, Taça de Portugal, King's Cup)		League cup (Note: Includes Taça da Liga)		Continental		Other		Total	
Club	Season	Division	Apps	Goals	Apps	Goals	Apps	Goals	Apps	Goals	Apps	Goals	Apps	Goals
Espanyol B	2009–10	Segunda División B	4	1	—		—		—		1 (Note: Appearance in Segunda División B relegation play-offs)	0	5	1
Barcelona B	2010–11	Segunda División	23	4	—		—		—		—		23	4
Barcelona B	2011–12	Segunda División	16	5	—		—		—		—		16	5
Barcelona B	Total		39	9	—		—		—		—		39	9
Barcelona	2010–11	La Liga	0	0	0	0	—		—		—		0	0
Barcelona	2011–12	La Liga	15	3	4	2	—		3 (Note: Appearances in UEFA Champions League)	2	—		22	7
Barcelona	2012–13	La Liga	22	7	6	0	—		4	1	2 (Note: Appearances in Supercopa de España)	0	34	8
Barcelona	2013–14	La Liga	22	1	6	3	—		2	1	0	0	30	5
Barcelona	Total		59	11	16	5	—		9	4	2	0	86	20
Porto (loan)	2014–15	Primeira Liga	25	7	1	0	3	0	8	1	—		37	8
Porto (loan)	2015–16	Primeira Liga	11	0	3	1	1	0	5	1	—		20	2
Porto (loan)	Total		36	7	4	1	4	0	13	2	—		57	10
Fiorentina (loan)	2015–16	Serie A	15	2	0	0	—		0	0	—		15	2
Fiorentina (loan)	2016–17	Serie A	36	4	0	0	—		5 (Note: Appearances in UEFA Europa League)	0	—		41	4
Fiorentina (loan)	Total		51	6	0	0	—		5	0	—		56	6
Betis	2017–18	La Liga	32	4	1	2	—		—		—		33	6
Betis	2018–19	La Liga	29	4	6	0	—		6	1	—		41	5
Betis	2019–20	La Liga	27	2	3	1	—		—		—		30	3
Betis	2020–21	La Liga	29	5	4	0	—		—		—		33	5
Betis	2021–22	La Liga	23	2	6	1	—		6	2	—		35	5
Betis	Total		140	17	20	4	—		12	3	—		172	24
Los Angeles FC	2022	MLS	4	0	—		—		—		1 (Note: Appearance in MLS Cup playoffs)	0	5	0
Al-Fateh	2022–23	Saudi Pro League	15	4	1	0	—		—		—		16	4
Al-Fateh	2023–24	Saudi Pro League	29	11	2	1	—		—		—		31	12
Al-Fateh	Total		44	15	3	1	—		—		—		47	16
Al-Orobah	2024–25	Saudi Pro League	26	5	1	0	—		—		—		27	5
Palm City	2025–26	UAE Second Division League	4	0	—		—		—		—		4	0
Career total			407	71	44	11	4	0	39	9	4	0	498	91

=== International ===
Appearances and goals by national team and year
National team	Year	Apps	Goals
Spain	2013	1	0
Total		1	0

== Honours ==
Barcelona

- La Liga: 2012–13
- Copa del Rey: 2011–12
- Supercopa de España: 2013

Betis

- Copa del Rey: 2021–22

Los Angeles FC

- MLS Cup: 2022
- Supporters' Shield: 2022

Palm City

- UAE Second Division League: 2025–26

Spain U21

- UEFA European Under-21 Championship: 2013

Individual

- SJPF Player of the Month: March 2015
