= 2012 Supercopa de España =

Barcelona	Real Madrid
4	4
- 4–4 on aggregate. Real Madrid won on away goals.

First leg
Barcelona	Real Madrid
3	2
- Date: 23 August 2012
- Venue: Camp Nou, Barcelona
- Referee: Carlos Clos Gómez
- Attendance: 91,728
- Weather: Partly Cloudy; 27 °C (81 °F)

Second leg
Real Madrid	Barcelona
2	1
- Date: 29 August 2012
- Venue: Santiago Bernabéu, Madrid
- Referee: Antonio Mateu Lahoz
- Attendance: 85,454
- Weather: Clear; 29 °C (84 °F)

The 2012 Supercopa de España was a two-legged Spanish football match-up that took place on 23 and 29 August 2012 between the champions of 2011–12 La Liga, Real Madrid, and the winner of the 2011–12 Copa del Rey, Barcelona. Barcelona and Real Madrid drew 4–4 on aggregate, with Real Madrid winning on away goals for their ninth Supercopa de España title. This was the first occasion the trophy was won on the away goals rule.

== Match details ==
=== First leg ===
23 August 2012
22:30 CEST

Barcelona	3–2	Real Madrid
Pedro 56'; Messi 70' (pen.); Xavi 78'	Report	Ronaldo 55'; Di María 85'

Camp Nou, Barcelona
Attendance: 91,728
Referee: Carlos Clos Gómez (Aragon)

Barcelona	Real Madrid

GK	1	(Spain) Víctor Valdés
RB	2	(Brazil) Dani Alves
CB	14	(Argentina) Javier Mascherano	(yellow card) 45'
CB	3	(Spain) Gerard Piqué	(yellow card) 49'
LB	21	(Brazil) Adriano
DM	16	(Spain) Sergio Busquets
CM	6	(Spain) Xavi (c)		(substituted off) 82'
CM	8	(Spain) Andrés Iniesta
RW	9	(Chile) Alexis Sánchez		(substituted off) 71'
LW	17	(Spain) Pedro		(substituted off) 86'
CF	10	(Argentina) Lionel Messi
Substitutes:
GK	13	(Spain) José Manuel Pinto
DF	5	(Spain) Carles Puyol
DF	18	(Spain) Jordi Alba		(substituted on) 86'
MF	4	(Spain) Cesc Fàbregas		(substituted on) 82'
MF	28	(Spain) Sergi Roberto
MF	37	(Spain) Cristian Tello		(substituted on) 71'
FW	7	(Spain) David Villa
Manager:
(Spain) Tito Vilanova

GK	1	(Spain) Iker Casillas (c)
RB	17	(Spain) Álvaro Arbeloa	(yellow card) 44'
CB	18	(Spain) Raúl Albiol	(yellow card) 50'
CB	4	(Spain) Sergio Ramos
LB	5	(Portugal) Fábio Coentrão
CM	14	(Spain) Xabi Alonso	(yellow card) 11'
CM	6	(Germany) Sami Khedira
RW	21	(Spain) José Callejón		(substituted off) 65'
LW	7	(Portugal) Cristiano Ronaldo
AM	10	(Germany) Mesut Özil		(substituted off) 81'
CF	9	(France) Karim Benzema		(substituted off) 60'
Substitutes:
GK	13	(Spain) Antonio Adán
DF	12	(Brazil) Marcelo		(substituted on) 81'
DF	2	(France) Raphaël Varane
MF	24	(France) Lassana Diarra
MF	11	(Spain) Esteban Granero
MF	22	(Argentina) Ángel Di María		(substituted on) 65'
FW	20	(Argentina) Gonzalo Higuaín		(substituted on) 60'
Manager:
(Portugal) José Mourinho

Assistant referees:
Calvo Guadamuro
Marco Martínez
Fourth official:
Usón Rosel

=== Second leg ===
29 August 2012
22:30 CEST

Real Madrid	2–1	Barcelona
Higuaín 11'; Ronaldo 19'	Report	Messi 45'

Santiago Bernabéu, Madrid
Attendance: 85,454
Referee: Antonio Mateu Lahoz (Valencian Community)

Real Madrid	Barcelona

GK	1	(Spain) Iker Casillas (c)
RB	17	(Spain) Álvaro Arbeloa	(yellow card) 38'
CB	3	(Portugal) Pepe	(yellow card) 20'
CB	4	(Spain) Sergio Ramos	(yellow card) 72'
LB	12	(Brazil) Marcelo
CM	14	(Spain) Xabi Alonso
CM	6	(Germany) Sami Khedira	(yellow card) 63'
RW	22	(Argentina) Ángel Di María		(substituted off) 79'
LW	7	(Portugal) Cristiano Ronaldo
AM	10	(Germany) Mesut Özil		(substituted off) 83'
CF	20	(Argentina) Gonzalo Higuaín		(substituted off) 82'
Substitutes:
GK	13	(Spain) Antonio Adán
DF	18	(Spain) Raúl Albiol
MF	19	(Croatia) Luka Modrić		(substituted on) 83'
MF	24	(France) Lassana Diarra
DF	27	(Spain) Nacho
MF	21	(Spain) José Callejón		(substituted on) 79'
FW	9	(France) Karim Benzema		(substituted on) 82'
Manager:
(Portugal) José Mourinho

GK	1	(Spain) Víctor Valdés
RB	21	(Brazil) Adriano	(red card) 28'
CB	14	(Argentina) Javier Mascherano	(yellow card) 14'
CB	3	(Spain) Gerard Piqué	(yellow card) 50'
LB	18	(Spain) Jordi Alba
DM	16	(Spain) Sergio Busquets		(substituted off) 75'
CM	6	(Spain) Xavi (c)
CM	8	(Spain) Andrés Iniesta
RW	9	(Chile) Alexis Sánchez		(substituted off) 32'
LW	17	(Spain) Pedro		(substituted off) 82'
CF	10	(Argentina) Lionel Messi
Substitutes:
GK	13	(Spain) José Manuel Pinto
DF	15	(Spain) Marc Bartra
DF	19	(Spain) Martín Montoya		(substituted on) 32'
MF	4	(Spain) Cesc Fàbregas
MF	25	(Cameroon) Alex Song		(substituted on) 75'
MF	37	(Spain) Cristian Tello		(substituted on) 82'
FW	7	(Spain) David Villa
Manager:
(Spain) Tito Vilanova

Assistant referees:
Cebrián Devis
Núñez Fernández
Fourth official:
Gil Coscolla

== See also ==
- El Clásico
- 2012–13 La Liga
- 2012–13 Copa del Rey
- 2012–13 FC Barcelona season
- 2012–13 Real Madrid CF season
