= Rafinha (footballer, born February 1993) =

Brazilian footballer

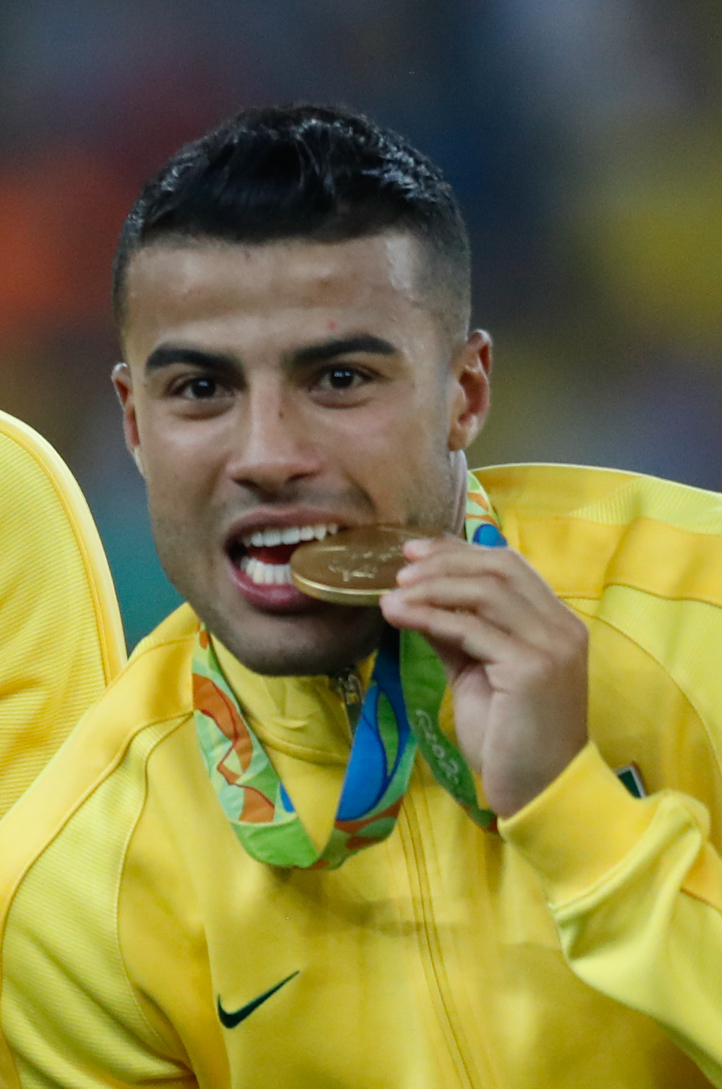
- Rafinha celebrating the gold medal with Brazil at the 2016 Summer Olympics

Personal information
- Full name: Rafael Alcântara do Nascimento
- Date of birth: 12 February 1993 (age 33)
- Place of birth: São Paulo, Brazil
- Height: 1.74 m (5 ft 9 in)
- Position: Midfielder

Youth career
- 2006–2011: Barcelona

Senior career*
Years	Team	Apps	(Gls)
2011–2013	Barcelona B	84	(19)
2011–2020	Barcelona	56	(8)
2013–2014	→ Celta (loan)	32	(4)
2018	→ Inter Milan (loan)	17	(2)
2019–2020	→ Celta (loan)	29	(4)
2020–2022	Paris Saint-Germain	28	(0)
2022	→ Real Sociedad (loan)	17	(1)
2022–2025	Al-Arabi	29	(5)
Total		292	(43)

International career
2009	Spain U16	2	(0)
2009–2010	Spain U17	8	(2)
2010	Spain U19	4	(1)
2013	Brazil U20	3	(0)
2014–2016	Brazil U23	6	(0)
2015	Brazil	2	(1)
Medal record
Representing Brazil
Olympic Games
Gold medal – first place	2016 Rio de Janeiro	Team
- * Club domestic league appearances and goals

Rafael Alcântara do Nascimento (born 12 February 1993), commonly known as Rafinha ([ʁɐˈfiɲa]), is a Brazilian former professional footballer who played as a midfielder.

He started his career with Barcelona, making his debut with the first team in 2011. After a loan at Celta, he played his first La Liga match for the former club in 2014. In October 2020, he signed with Paris Saint-Germain.

Rafinha represented both Spain and Brazil at youth level, before debuting with the latter as a senior in 2015.

== Club career ==
=== Barcelona ===
Born in São Paulo, Brazil, Rafinha joined Barcelona's youth ranks at the age of 13. On 8 January 2011 he made his professional debut with the B team, coming on as a substitute for Jonathan dos Santos in the 55th minute of a 2–1 home loss against Girona in the Segunda División. A week later, again off the bench and in the same competition, he scored his first goal in a 3–2 win at Salamanca, also adding an assist.

Rafinha made his debut with the senior Barcelona squad on 9 November 2011, taking the place of Cesc Fàbregas for the last 15 minutes of a 1–0 away victory over Hospitalet in the Copa del Rey. He finished the league season with 39 games – 35 starts – and eight goals for the reserves, including two in a 4–0 defeat of Cartagena on 4 September of the same year.

On 27 June 2013, Rafinha extended his contract with Barça, keeping him at the club until 2016. A few weeks later, he was loaned to fellow La Liga team Celta, and made his debut in the Spanish top flight on 19 August, helping the Galicians to a 2–2 home draw against Espanyol. He scored his first league goal 12 days later in another draw at the Balaídos (1–1, with Granada).

Rafinha scored a brace at Real Sociedad on 23 November 2013, but it amounted to nothing as the hosts won 4–3 with four goals from Carlos Vela. He was voted the league's Breakthrough Player of the Season, ahead of Real Madrid's Jesé and Rayo Vallecano's Saúl Ñíguez.

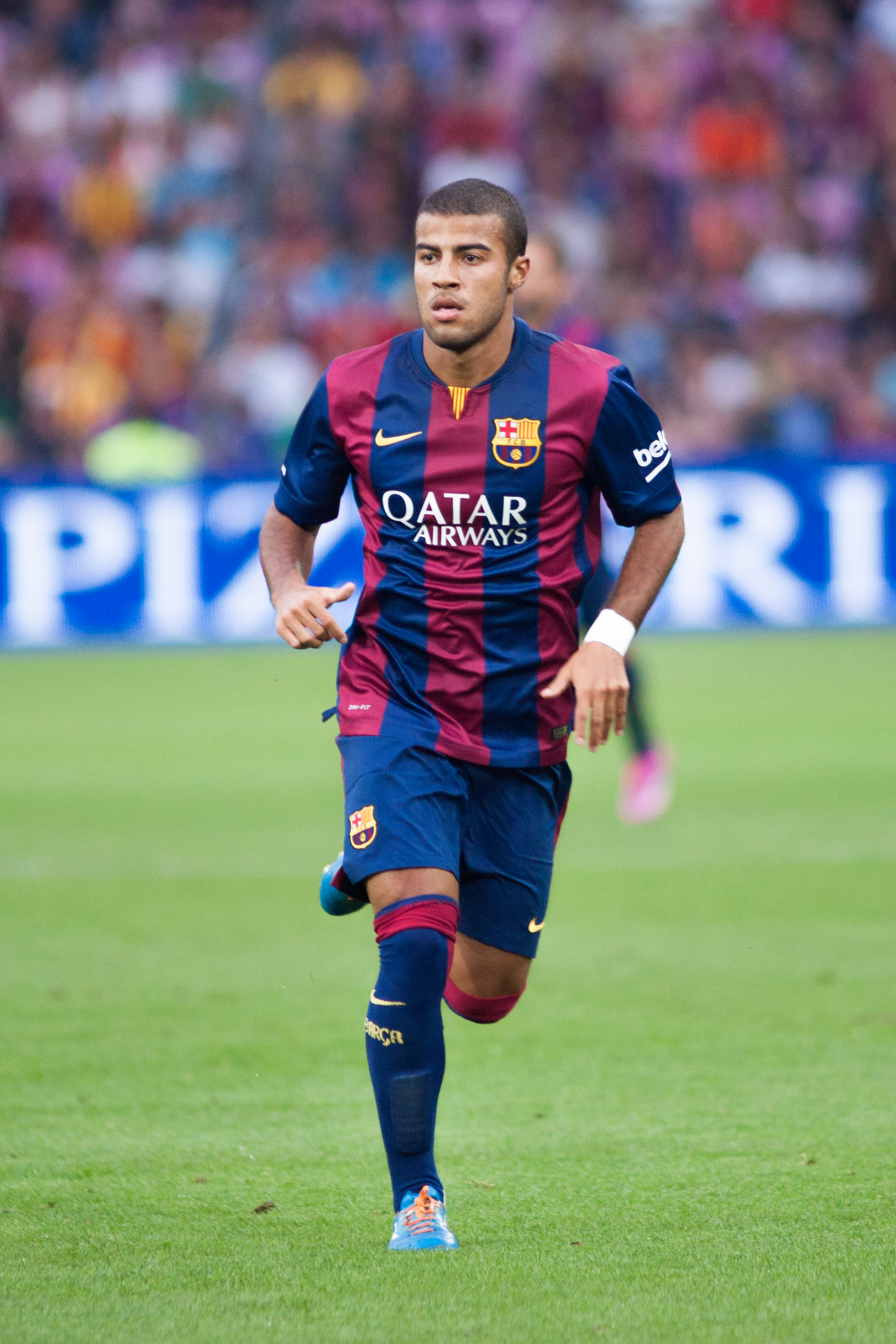
Rafinha playing for Barcelona in August 2014 against Napoli

Rafinha made his league debut for Barcelona on 24 August 2014 in Luis Enrique's first match in charge, playing the first half of an eventual 3–0 win against Elche at the Camp Nou before being replaced by Marc Bartra. On 25 November, he assisted Lionel Messi's goal in a 4–0 group stage victory at APOEL, which made him the outright top scorer in the history of the UEFA Champions League; however, he was also sent off for two bookings later on in the match.

Rafinha scored his first goal for the Blaugrana on 3 December 2014, concluding a 4–0 away win against Huesca in the first leg of the Spanish Cup's last 32 (12–1 aggregate). The following 1 February, he recorded his first goal for the team in the domestic league, part of a 3–2 home defeat of Villarreal. They went on to win the treble, with the player being an unused substitute in the domestic and European finals.

With compatriot Neymar out through illness, Rafinha started on the left of Barcelona's attack in the 2015 UEFA Super Cup against Sevilla in Tbilisi, scoring the third goal in a 5–4 win. On 16 September he suffered a torn right anterior cruciate ligament during the 1–1 away draw to Roma in the Champions League group phase, leaving the game on a stretcher after being on the receiving end of a heavy challenge from Radja Nainggolan; after surgery, he was expected to be out for about six months.

Rafinha scored six times in only 18 appearances in the 2016–17 campaign, but also had to undergo surgery to an internal meniscus ailment following a match against Granada in April 2017, going on to be sidelined until the end of the year.

On 22 January 2018, Inter Milan announced the acquisition of Rafinha on a loan with an option to buy for €35 million. He made his debut for the club six days later by entering in the last moments of the 1–1 draw against SPAL. He scored his first goal on 6 May, in the 4–0 away victory over Udinese.

On 24 November 2018, Rafinha ruptured the anterior cruciate ligament of his left knee during a 1–1 draw at Atlético Madrid, being again sidelined for several months. On 2 September 2019, immediately after extending his contract until 2021, he rejoined Celta on a season-long loan.

=== Paris Saint-Germain ===
Rafinha signed a three-year deal with Paris Saint-Germain on 5 October 2020. He made his Ligue 1 debut 11 days later in a 4–0 win at Nîmes, and assisted the opening goal scored by Kylian Mbappé.

On 27 December 2021, Rafinha joined Real Sociedad on loan for the remainder of the season. He scored his only goal the following 13 February, closing the 2–0 home defeat of Granada.

=== Al-Arabi ===
On 3 September 2022, Rafinha moved to Al-Arabi of the Qatar Stars League on a two-year contract.

== International career ==
Rafinha played for Spain at youth level, earning 14 caps for three different teams. On 29 February 2012, he scored for the under-19s in the first minute of their 2–1 friendly win over France in Meaux.

Later that year, however, Rafinha switched allegiance to Brazil, going on to represent the under-20 side at the 2013 South American Youth Championship in Argentina. He was one of seven stand-by players named by Dunga for the senior team at the 2015 Copa América.

In September 2015, Rafinha was called up by Dunga for friendlies against Costa Rica and the United States. On 5 September, he entered the former game at New Jersey's Red Bull Arena in the 81st minute in place of Luiz Gustavo. Four days later, a minute after taking the field against the latter, he scored his first goal, then assisted clubmate Neymar in a 4–1 win.

== Personal life ==
Rafinha's father, Mazinho, was also a footballer and a midfielder, notably winning the 1994 FIFA World Cup with Brazil. His mother Valéria played volleyball, while his older brother, Thiago – another midfielder – also emerged through Barcelona's youth ranks, going on to represent its first team and the Spain national side.

Rodrigo, who played youth football with Real Madrid and went on to spend several seasons with Benfica and Valencia, is a lifelong friend who has erroneously been referred to as Rafinha's cousin.

== Career statistics ==
=== Club ===
As of match played 25 April 2023

Appearances and goals by club, season and competition
Club	Season	League			National cup		Continental		Other		Total	
Club	Season	Division	Apps	Goals	Apps	Goals	Apps	Goals	Apps	Goals	Apps	Goals
Barcelona B	2010–11	Segunda División	9	1	—		—		—		9	1
Barcelona B	2011–12	Segunda División	39	8	—		—		—		39	8
Barcelona B	2012–13	Segunda División	36	10	—		—		—		36	10
Barcelona B	Total		84	19	—		—		—		84	19
Barcelona	2011–12	La Liga	0	0	1	0	1 (Note: Appearances in UEFA Champions League)	0	0	0	2	0
Barcelona	2012–13	La Liga	0	0	0	0	1	0	0	0	1	0
Barcelona	2014–15	La Liga	24	1	6	1	6	0	—		36	2
Barcelona	2015–16	La Liga	6	1	1	0	2	0	2 (Note: One appearance and one goal in UEFA Super Cup, one appearance in Supercopa de España)	1	11	2
Barcelona	2016–17	La Liga	18	6	4	1	6	0	0	0	28	7
Barcelona	2017–18	La Liga	0	0	1	0	0	0	0	0	1	0
Barcelona	2018–19	La Liga	5	0	0	0	2	1	1 (Note: Appearance in Supercopa de España)	0	8	1
Barcelona	2019–20	La Liga	3	0	0	0	0	0	0	0	3	0
Barcelona	Total		56	8	13	2	18	1	3	1	90	12
Celta (loan)	2013–14	La Liga	32	4	1	0	—		—		33	4
Inter Milan (loan)	2017–18	Serie A	17	2	0	0	—		—		17	2
Celta (loan)	2019–20	La Liga	29	4	1	0	—		—		30	4
Paris Saint-Germain	2020–21	Ligue 1	23	0	3	0	8	0	0	0	34	0
Paris Saint-Germain	2021–22	Ligue 1	5	0	0	0	0	0	0	0	5	0
Paris Saint-Germain	Total		28	0	3	0	8	0	0	0	39	0
Real Sociedad (loan)	2021–22	La Liga	17	1	2	0	2 (Note: Appearances in UEFA Europa League)	0	—		21	1
Al-Arabi	2022–23	Qatar Stars League	10	0	3	2	—		8 (Note: Three appearances in FIFA Referees Cup, four appearances in Qatari Stars Cup, one appearance in Qatar Cup)	1	21	3
Career total			273	38	23	4	28	1	11	2	335	45

=== International ===
Appearances and goals by national team and year
National team	Year	Apps	Goals
Brazil	2015	2	1
Total		2	1

Appearances and goals by national team at Summer Olympics
National team	Year	Apps	Goals
Brazil	2016	5	0
Total		5	0

Scores and results list Brazil's goal tally first, score column indicates score after each Rafinha goal.

List of international goals scored by Rafinha
No.	Date	Venue	Opponent	Score	Result	Competition
1	8 September 2015	Gillette Stadium, Foxborough, United States	United States	3–0	4–1	Friendly

== Honours ==
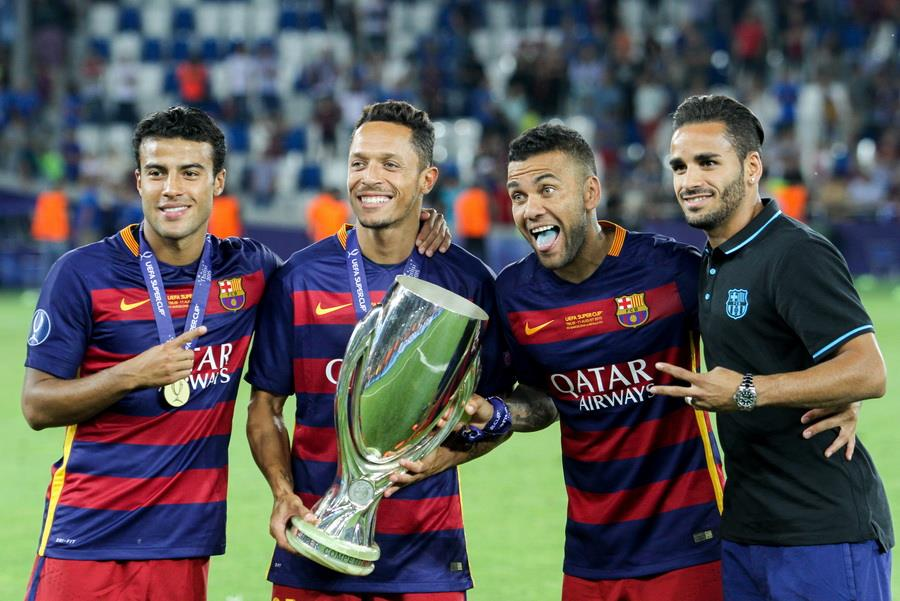
Rafinha (left) posing with the 2015 UEFA Super Cup, alongside compatriots Adriano, Dani Alves and Douglas

Barcelona

- La Liga: 2014–15, 2015–16, 2018–19
- Copa del Rey: 2011–12, 2014–15, 2015–16, 2016–17, 2017–18
- Supercopa de España: 2016, 2019
- UEFA Champions League: 2014–15
- UEFA Super Cup: 2015
- FIFA Club World Cup: 2015

Paris Saint-Germain

- Ligue 1: 2021–22
- Coupe de France: 2020–21

Al-Arabi

- Emir of Qatar Cup: 2023

Brazil U20

- Toulon Tournament: 2013

Brazil U23

- Summer Olympic Games: 2016

Individual

- La Liga Breakthrough Player: 2013–14
- La Liga Player of the Month: February 2014
