= Ramón Moya =

Spanish footballer and coach

Personal information
- Full name: Ramón Moya Ribalta
- Date of birth: 2 March 1956 (age 70)
- Place of birth: Castellnou de Seana, Spain
- Position: Defender

Senior career*
Years	Team	Apps	(Gls)
1975–1977	Sant Andreu	6	(0)
1979–1980	Badalona		

Managerial career
- 1990–1993: Espanyol (youth)
- 1993–1994: Hospitalet
- 1995: Gimnàstic
- 1996–1999: Hospitalet
- 1999–2002: Espanyol B
- 2002: Espanyol
- 2004–2006: Hospitalet
- 2006–2009: Sabadell
- 2010–2012: Gramenet
- 2014: Castellón
- 2014: Castellón (interim)
- * Club domestic league appearances and goals

Ramón Moya Ribalta (born 2 March 1956) is a Spanish retired footballer who played as a defender, and is a current coach.

== Managerial career ==
After a short spell as a footballer with UE Sant Andreu, Moya started his managerial career with RCD Espanyol's Juvenil team. In 1993, he was appointed CE L'Hospitalet manager, with the side in Segunda División B.

In April 1995 Moya was named at the helm of Gimnàstic de Tarragona, seriously threatened with relegation. After narrowly avoiding it, he left the club and subsequently returned to Hospi in the following year.

In the 1999 summer Moya was appointed manager of RCD Espanyol B, in Tercera División. In October 2002 he was named manager of the first team in La Liga, after Juande Ramos was suspended; his spell would only last two months, however.

In 2006, after another spell at Hospitalet, Moya was appointed at CE Sabadell FC. He brought the club back to Segunda División B in his first campaign, but was dismissed on 10 November 2009.

On 12 January 2014, after an unsuccessful spell at UDA Gramenet, Moya was named at the helm of CD Castellón. He left the post in May and immediately joined the club's board, but in October acted as an interim.
