= José Ramón de la Fuente =

Spanish footballer and coach (born 1970)

Personal information
- Full name: José Ramón de la Fuente Morató
- Date of birth: 22 December 1970 (age 55)
- Place of birth: Girona, Spain
- Height: 1.79 m (5 ft 10 in)
- Position: Goalkeeper

Team information
- Current team: Barcelona (goalkeeping coach)

Senior career*
Years	Team	Apps	(Gls)
1992–1993	Barcelona B	0	(0)
1993–1994	Palamos	9	(0)
1994–1995	Barcelona B	9	(0)
1995–2002	Toledo	152	(0)
1999	→ Córdoba (loan)	13	(0)
2002–2003	Gimnàstic	11	(0)
2003–2004	Sabadell	35	(0)
2004–2005	Girona	14	(0)
Total		229	(0)
- * Club domestic league appearances and goals

José Ramón de la Fuente Morató (born 22 December 1970) is a Spanish football goalkeeping coach and former goalkeeper. He is current goalkeeper coach of La Liga club Barcelona. He was appointed under Tito Vilanova, and has remained in his role through all managements since then.

== Playing career ==
Fuente played for Barcelona B in the 1994–95 season.

== Coaching career ==
Fuente retired while playing at Écija, started his coaching career with them in 2006. He has coached sides like Hércules (2008–09), Racing Union as assistant coach (2009–10), Gimnàstic (2010–11) and back to Hércules (2011–12).
