= CE L'Hospitalet =

Association football club

L'Hospitalet
- Full name: Centre d´Esports L'Hospitalet
- Nicknames: L'Hospi; Riberencs (Riversiders)
- Founded: 7 July 1957; 69 years ago (as Centro de Deportes Hospitalet)
- Ground: Municipal de L'Hospitalet, L'Hospitalet, Catalonia, Spain
- Capacity: 6,740
- President: Antoni García
- Head coach: Cristian Gómez
- League: Tercera Federación – Group 5
- 2025–26: Tercera Federación – Group 5, 5th of 18
Home colours	Away colours

Centre d'Esports l'Hospitalet is a Spanish football team based in L'Hospitalet de Llobregat, in the autonomous community of Catalonia. Founded in 1957 it currently plays in Tercera Federación – Group 5, holding home games at Estadi Municipal de Futbol de L'Hospitalet, with a capacity of 6,740 seats.

== History ==
Centre D'Esports L'Hospitalet was founded in 1957, through the merger of three teams from the city: UD Hospitalet, CD Santa Eulalia and CF Hércules.

It managed to appear three times in Segunda División, but this was prior to the creation of Segunda División B as the new third level, a category the club first reached in 1982 and where it would remain for the vast majority of the time until 2017. Since 2017 and as of 2026, the club has mostly played at the fourth and fifth levels.

== Season to season ==
Season	Tier	Division	Place	Copa del Rey
1957–58	3	3ª	15th	
1958–59	3	3ª	4th	
1959–60	3	3ª	1st	
1960–61	3	3ª	2nd	
1961–62	3	3ª	5th	
1962–63	3	3ª	2nd	
1963–64	2	2ª	13th	
1964–65	2	2ª	11th	
1965–66	2	2ª	15th	
1966–67	3	3ª	19th	
1967–68	4	1ª Reg.	6th	
1968–69	4	Reg. Pref.	7th	
1969–70	4	Reg. Pref.	8th	
1970–71	5	1ª Reg.	6th	
1971–72	5	1ª Reg.	1st	
1972–73	4	Reg. Pref.	4th	
1973–74	4	Reg. Pref.	11th	
1974–75	4	Reg. Pref.	2nd	
1975–76	4	Reg. Pref.	8th	
1976–77	4	Reg. Pref.	8th	

Season	Tier	Division	Place	Copa del Rey
1977–78	4	3ª	10th	
1978–79	4	3ª	20th	
1979–80	5	Reg. Pref.	1st	
1980–81	4	3ª	8th	
1981–82	4	3ª	1st	
1982–83	3	2ª B	14th	
1983–84	3	2ª B	16th	
1984–85	3	2ª B	12th	
1985–86	3	2ª B	10th	
1986–87	4	3ª	5th	
1987–88	3	2ª B	5th	
1988–89	3	2ª B	10th	
1989–90	3	2ª B	9th	
1990–91	3	2ª B	6th	
1991–92	3	2ª B	5th	
1992–93	3	2ª B	7th	
1993–94	3	2ª B	6th	
1994–95	3	2ª B	12th	
1995–96	3	2ª B	13th	
1996–97	3	2ª B	7th	

Season	Tier	Division	Place	Copa del Rey
1997–98	3	2ª B	12th	
1998–99	3	2ª B	12th	
1999–2000	3	2ª B	10th	
2000–01	3	2ª B	6th	
2001–02	3	2ª B	4th	Forfeit
2002–03	3	2ª B	19th	
2003–04	4	3ª	3rd	
2004–05	4	3ª	1st	
2005–06	3	2ª B	12th	Fourth round
2006–07	3	2ª B	4th	
2007–08	3	2ª B	19th	Third round
2008–09	4	3ª	3rd	
2009–10	4	3ª	1st	
2010–11	3	2ª B	6th	Second round
2011–12	3	2ª B	6th	Round of 32
2012–13	3	2ª B	1st	Second round
2013–14	3	2ª B	2nd	Second round
2014–15	3	2ª B	9th	
2015–16	3	2ª B	15th	
2016–17	3	2ª B	17th	

Season	Tier	Division	Place	Copa del Rey
2017–18	4	3ª	3rd	
2018–19	4	3ª	2nd	
2019–20	4	3ª	1st	First round
2020–21	3	2ª B	9th / 6th	First round
2021–22	5	3ª RFEF	6th	
2022–23	5	3ª Fed.	4th	
2023–24	5	3ª Fed.	2nd	
2024–25	5	3ª Fed.	7th	First round
2025–26	5	3ª Fed.	5th	
2026–27	5	3ª Fed.		

- 3 seasons in Segunda División
- 31 seasons in Segunda División B
- 19 seasons in Tercera División
- 6 seasons in Tercera Federación/Tercera División RFEF

== Honours ==
- Segunda División B: 2012–13
- Tercera División: 1959–60, 1981–82, 2004–05, 2009–10, 2019–20
- Copa Catalunya 2019–20

== Players ==
=== Current squad ===
As of 15 September 2025

Note: Flags indicate national team as defined under FIFA eligibility rules; some limited exceptions apply. Players may hold more than one non-FIFA nationality.

No.	Pos.	Nation	Player
1	GK	ESP	Adrià Aliaga
2	DF	ESP	Rubi Cruz
3	DF	ESP	Ramón Marimón
4	DF	MDA	Vitalie Pentelei
5	DF	ESP	Sergio Castillo
6	MF	ESP	Uri González
7	FW	ESP	Javi Serra
8	MF	ESP	Dani Molina
9	FW	ESP	Jairo Morillas
10	MF	ESP	Joel Lasso
11	FW	ESP	Flavio Ribeiro

No.	Pos.	Nation	Player
12	FW	ESP	Guillem Olivés
13	GK	ESP	Eric Mourin
14	MF	ESP	Adri García
16	FW	GAM	Buba Juwara
17	DF	ESP	Dani Hernández
18	FW	ESP	Carlos Martínez
19	FW	ESP	Pol Ballesteros
20	DF	ESP	Jordi Solé
21	DF	ESP	Antonio Pelegrín
22	MF	ESP	Josep Serrano
23	DF	ESP	Maxi Rodríguez

== Notable coaches ==
- (Uruguay) Dagoberto Moll

== Coaches ==
- (Croatia) Zvonko Monsider (1958–1959)
- (Spain) Enric Rabassa (1963–1964)
- (Uruguay) Dagoberto Moll (1964–1965)
- (Spain) Julián Arcas Sánchez (1965–1966)
- (Spain) Gabriel Taltavull Monjo (1966)
- (Spain) Roberto Puerto Castells (1982–1983)
- (Spain) Esperanza (1983–1985)
- (Spain) Josep Mauri Carbonell (1986)
- (Argentina) Raúl Longhi (1986–1987)
- (Spain) Juan José Díaz Galiana (1987–1990)
- (Spain) Antoni Gras (1990)
- (Spain) Rafael González Anguita (1990)
- (Spain) Jaime Sabaté Mercadé (1990–1992)
- (Spain) Alfonso Martínez Salinas (1992)
- (Spain) Marc Serrano Villuendas (1992)
- (Spain) Ramón Moya (1993–1994)
- (Spain) Josep María Nogués (1994–1996)
- (Spain) Ramón Moya(1996–1999)
- (Spain) Miquel Corominas Queralt (1999–2000)
- (Spain) Lluís Pujol (2000–2001)
- (Spain) García Escribano (2001–2002)
- (Spain) Jaume Creixell Barnada (2002–2003)
- (Spain) Roberto Elvira (2004–2005)
- (Spain) Ramón Moya (2005–2006)
- (Spain) Juan Carlos Oliva (2006–2007)
- (Spain) Jordi Roura (2007)
- (Spain) Andrés García Tébar (2008)
- (Spain) Julià Garcia (2008–2009)
- (Spain) Jordi Vinyals (2009–2010)
- (Spain) Ángel Pedraza (2010)
- (Spain) Miguel Álvarez (2010–2011)
- (Spain) Jordi Vinyals (2011–2012)
- (Spain) Miguel Álvarez (2012–2013)
- (Spain) Martín Posse (2013)
- (Spain) Kiko Ramírez (2013–2015)
- (Spain) Martí Cifuentes (2015–2016)
- (Spain) Miquel Corominas (2016)
- (Spain) Ismael García Gómez (2016–2017)
- (Spain) Xavi Molist (2017–2019)
- (Spain) Jonathan Risueño (2019–2021)
- (Spain) Cristian García (2021–2022)
- (Spain) Diego Quintero (2022)
- (Spain) Héctor Simón (2022–2023)
- (Spain) Joan Sánchez (2023–2024)
- (Spain) Jaume Delgado (2024–2025)
- (Spain) Cristian Gómez (2025–)
