= Jordi Roura =

Spanish footballer

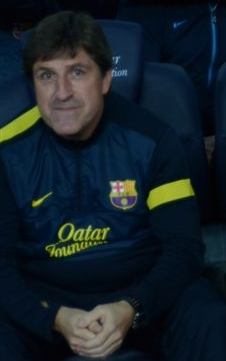
- Roura on the bench for Barcelona

Personal information
- Full name: Jordi Roura Solà
- Date of birth: 10 September 1967 (age 59)
- Place of birth: Llagostera, Spain
- Height: 1.72 m (5 ft 7 1/2 in)
- Position: Midfielder

Youth career
- 1982–1986: Barcelona

Senior career*
Years	Team	Apps	(Gls)
1984–1991	Barcelona B	65	(4)
1985–1987	Barcelona C	10	(2)
1988–1992	Barcelona	10	(0)
1991–1992	→ Murcia (loan)	11	(1)
1992–1993	Figueres	13	(0)
1994	Sant Andreu	11	(3)
Total		120	(10)

Managerial career
- 1996–1998: Yokohama Flügels (assistant)
- 2007: Hospitalet
- 2012–2014: Barcelona (assistant)
- 2013: Barcelona (interim)
- * Club domestic league appearances and goals

Jordi Roura Solà (born 10 September 1967) is a Spanish former footballer who played as a midfielder.

== Playing career ==
Born in Llagostera, Girona, Catalonia, Roura arrived at FC Barcelona's La Masia in the summer of 1982, aged 15. He made his first senior appearance two years later (whilst still a junior), playing 90 minutes for the B team in a 4–0 away win against Real Madrid Castilla and going on to spend two full seasons with the side in the Segunda División, being relegated in 1989.

Roura made his La Liga debut on 11 September 1988 in a 3–0 victory at Elche CF, under Johan Cruyff, but a serious injury to his right knee in the 1989 European Super Cup against AC Milan severely hindered his growth as a footballer. He went on to appear in only nine additional league matches for the remainder of his spell at the Camp Nou.

Released by the Blaugrana in 1991, Roura resumed his career in the second tier, being relegated with both Real Murcia and UE Figueres and continuing to be bothered by physical problems. He retired in June 1994 at only 26, after half a season with lowly UE Sant Andreu.

== Coaching career ==
Roura's first job as a coach was in Japan, being part of fellow former Barcelona player Carles Rexach's staff at Yokohama Flügels in the late 90s. Subsequently, he worked in directorial capacities with another club in his native region, Terrassa FC, remaining in that position until 2007.

Roura spent the early part of the 2007–08 season at the helm of CE L'Hospitalet in the Segunda División B, being fired in late December 2007 as his side eventually suffered relegation. In 2009, he was part of the Barcelona team of observers in Pep Guardiola's technical staff; in the following three years, he was in charge of analysing the rivals.

On 30 June 2012, after Guardiola's departure, Roura replaced his lifelong friend Tito Vilanova as Barcelona's assistant manager, as the latter was promoted to head coaching duties. On 19 December he took over on an interim basis, when it was learned the former had suffered a recurrence of parotid gland cancer that would need surgery the following day; according to the club, he would be in charge for approximately six weeks whilst Vilanova was in chemotherapy and radiotherapy treatment.
