= Adriano (footballer, born 1984) =

Brazilian footballer

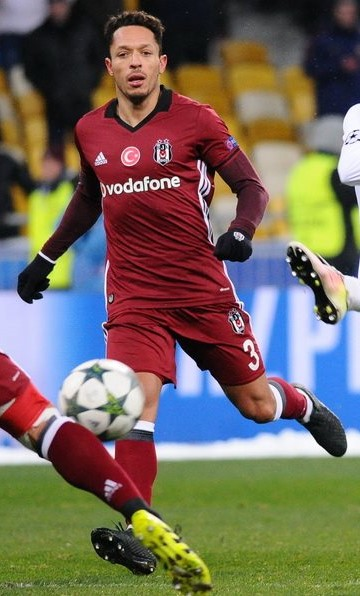
- Adriano playing for Beşiktaş in 2016

Personal information
- Full name: Adriano Correia Claro
- Date of birth: 26 October 1984 (age 42)
- Place of birth: Curitiba, Brazil
- Height: 1.73 m (5 ft 8 in)
- Positions: Full-back; midfielder

Youth career
- 1997–2002: Coritiba

Senior career*
Years	Team	Apps	(Gls)
2002–2004	Coritiba	44	(2)
2005–2010	Sevilla	157	(11)
2010–2016	Barcelona	114	(9)
2016–2019	Beşiktaş	78	(3)
2019–2020	Athletico Paranaense	15	(1)
2020–2021	Eupen	24	(0)
Total		432	(26)

International career
2003	Brazil U20	4	(0)
2003–2013	Brazil	17	(0)
Medal record
Representing Brazil
Copa América
Winner	2004 Peru
FIFA U-20 World Cup
Winner	2003 UAE
- * Club domestic league appearances and goals

Adriano Correia Claro (born 26 October 1984), known simply as Adriano, is a Brazilian former professional footballer. One of few players in professional football who are genuinely ambidextrous, he was capable of playing as a full-back or midfielder on both sides of the pitch.

After starting his career with Coritiba, he moved to Spain in 2005, going on to spend several seasons in La Liga with Sevilla and Barcelona and win several major titles with both clubs, including the treble with the latter in 2015.

A Brazilian international for ten years, Adriano represented his country in two Copa América tournaments, winning the 2004 edition.

== Club career ==
=== Early years and Sevilla ===
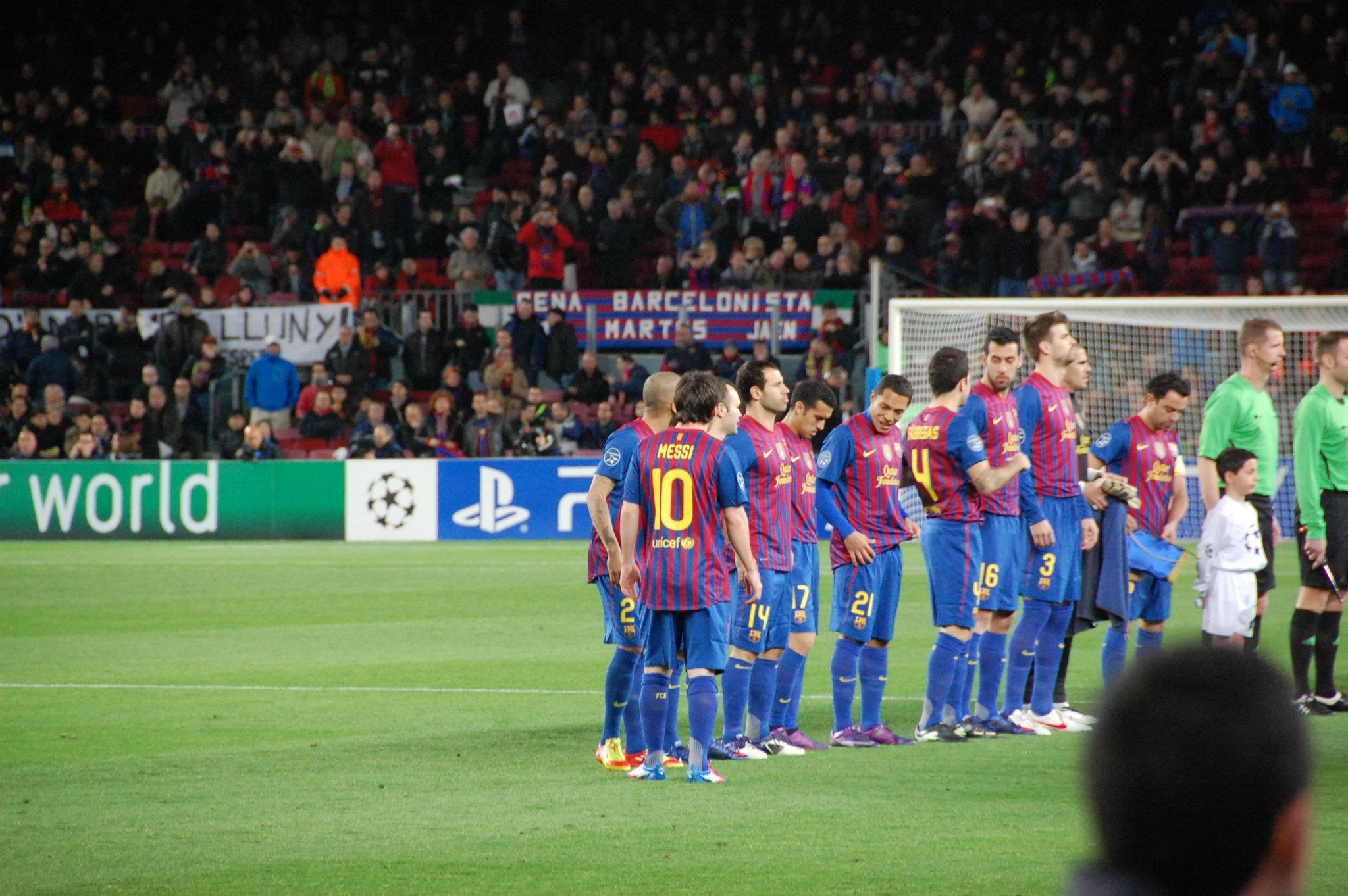
Adriano (middle, #21) as a Barcelona player in 2012

Born in Curitiba, Paraná, Adriano started professionally for his hometown club Coritiba, making his first-team debuts at not yet 18. In January 2005, he joined Spanish side Sevilla on a four-and-a-half-year deal, his La Liga debut arriving on the 29th in a 4–0 home loss against eventual champions Barcelona; the Andalusians, however, did finish sixth and qualified for the UEFA Cup.

In the following seasons, Adriano continued to feature in several positions for Sevilla with equal success as they won back-to-back UEFA Cups, with the player contributing with 25 games and four goals in both editions combined. In the final of the latter edition, he opened the score against Espanyol in an eventual penalty shootout win; previously, in late September 2006, he had added a further five years to his link.

After three years residing in the country, Adriano was granted Spanish citizenship. He struggled with some injuries during the 2009–10 campaign, but still contributed with 27 matches (no goals) as his team finished fourth and returned to the UEFA Champions League.

=== Barcelona ===
On 16 July 2010, Adriano signed a 4+1 contract with Barcelona, for €9.5 million plus a conditional fee of €4 million – it also included a buyout clause of €90 million. He was awarded the No. 21 shirt vacated by Dmytro Chyhrynskyi, and made his debut in a pre-season friendly against Vålerenga, coming on as a second-half substitute; on 14 August he first appeared officially, in the first leg of Supercopa de España, a 3–1 loss at former side Sevilla.

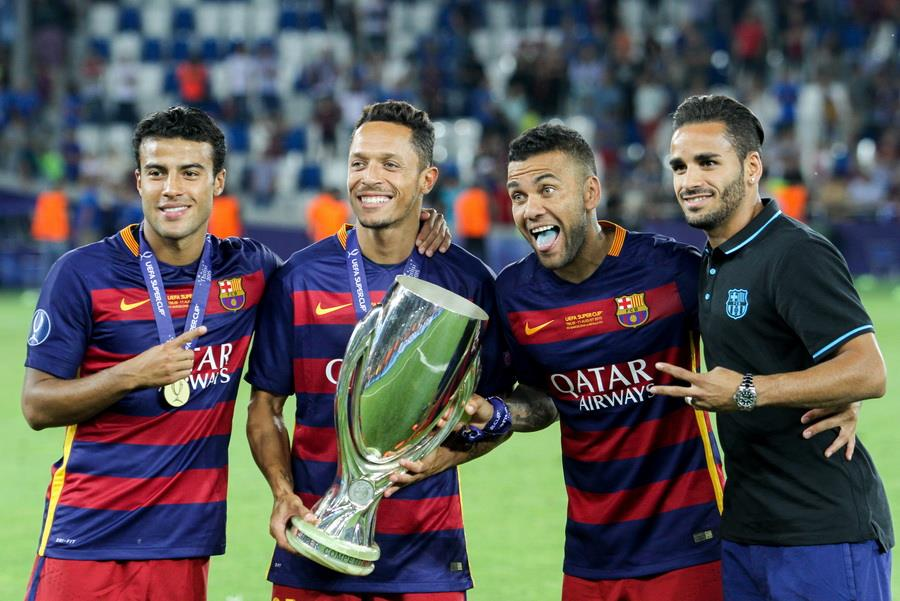
Adriano (second from the left) posing with the 2015 UEFA Super Cup, alongside compatriots Rafinha, Dani Alves and Douglas.

Adriano spent the vast majority of his first season with Barça as a substitute. On 2 February 2011, in a rare start, he scored his first goal for the Catalans in a 3–0 semi-final away win against Almería in the Copa del Rey (8–0 on aggregate); due to the illness of first-choice left-back Eric Abidal he became a regular starter from March onwards, although the Frenchman recovered in time to start in the 2011 UEFA Champions League Final.

In 2011–12, Adriano was again mostly a reserve for the Pep Guardiola-led side. On 15 December 2011, however, in the 2011 FIFA Club World Cup, he scored the first two goals in a 4–0 semi-final win over Sadd Sports Club, the first coming after a mistake by the Qatari team's defense to open the score in the 25th minute.

Early into the 2012–13 season, Adriano played the role of hero and villain in a matter of days: in the Spanish Supercup second leg he was sent off midway through the first half of an eventual 2–1 away loss against Real Madrid (4–4 aggregate defeat on the away goals rule), for bringing down Cristiano Ronaldo as the last man; On 2 September 2012, he scored the game's only goal at home against Valencia, through a spectacular right-foot curl.

On 28 May 2013, Adriano signed a new contract with Barcelona, keeping him at the club until 2017. During the 2014 pre-season, after being diagnosed with an irregular heartbeat, he was sidelined for several weeks, but eventually recovered fully.

Adriano scored his first goal of the 2015–16 campaign on 24 November 2015, hitting home following a missed penalty from Neymar and closing the score at 6–1 against Roma in the Champions League group stage. He had replaced Sergi Roberto for the last 26 minutes of the match.

=== Beşiktaş ===
On 29 July 2016, after having appeared in 189 competitive matches for Barcelona and scored 17 goals, Adriano signed for Beşiktaş in Turkey. He netted once from 31 appearances in his first season, helping the club win its 15th Süper Lig championship.

=== Athletico Paranaense ===
Adriano returned to Brazil on 23 July 2019, with the 34-year-old joining Athletico Paranaense on a one-and-a-half-year deal.

=== Eupen ===
In August 2020, Adriano signed a new contract with the Belgian First Division A team Eupen on a free transfer. He left the club at the end of the 2020–21 season and in September 2021 he was looking for a club.

== International career ==
Shortly after helping the Brazilian under-20s win the 2003 FIFA World Youth Championship, Adriano made his full team debut also in that year. In 2004, he was part of the squad that won the Copa América in Peru.

== Career statistics ==
=== Club ===
Appearances and goals by club, season and competition
Club	Season	League			State League		Cup		Continental		Other		Total	
Club	Season	Division	Apps	Goals	Apps	Goals	Apps	Goals	Apps	Goals	Apps	Goals	Apps	Goals
Sevilla	2004–05	La Liga	16	2	—		0	0	4 (Note: All appearances in UEFA Cup)	1	—		20	3
Sevilla	2005–06	La Liga	32	3	—		0	0	13	3	—		45	6
Sevilla	2006–07	La Liga	26	2	—		3	0	11	1	1 (Note: Appearance in UEFA Super Cup)	0	41	3
Sevilla	2007–08	La Liga	27	1	—		0	0	6	0	0	0	33	1
Sevilla	2008–09	La Liga	29	3	—		6	1	5	1	—		40	5
Sevilla	2009–10	La Liga	27	0	—		4	0	4 (Note: All appearances in UEFA Champions League)	1	—		35	1
Sevilla	Total		157	11	—		13	1	43	7	1	0	214	19
Barcelona	2010–11	La Liga	15	0	—		8	1	6	0	2 (Note: All appearances in Supercopa de España)	0	31	1
Barcelona	2011–12	La Liga	26	1	—		3	0	7	0	4 (Note: One appearance in UEFA Super Cup, two appearances in Supercopa de España, one appearance and two goals in FIFA Club World Cup)	2	40	3
Barcelona	2012–13	La Liga	23	5	—		3	1	6	0	2	0	34	6
Barcelona	2013–14	La Liga	26	3	—		7	1	5	0	0	0	38	4
Barcelona	2014–15	La Liga	16	0	—		4	2	7	0	—		27	2
Barcelona	2015–16	La Liga	8	0	—		6	0	3	1	2 (Note: One appearance in Supercopa de España, one appearance in FIFA Club World Cup)	0	19	1
Barcelona	Total		114	9	—		31	5	34	1	10	2	189	17
Beşiktaş	2016–17	Süper Lig	31	1	—		3	0	10	1	1 (Note: Appearance in Turkish Super Cup)	0	45	2
Beşiktaş	2017–18	Süper Lig	25	2	—		4	0	6	0	1	0	36	2
Beşiktaş	2018–19	Süper Lig	22	0	—		0	0	7 (Note: All appearances in UEFA Europa League)	0	0	0	29	0
Beşiktaş	Total		78	3	—		7	0	23	1	2	0	110	4
Athletico Paranaense	2019	Série A	11	1	—		0	0	0	0	0	0	11	1
Athletico Paranaense	2020	Série A	0	0	4 (Note: All appearances in Campeonato Paranaense)	0	0	0	2 (Note: All appearances in Copa Libertadores)	0	0	0	6	0
Athletico Paranaense	Total		11	1	4	0	0	0	2	0	0	0	17	1
Eupen	2020–21	Belgian Pro League	24	0	—		2	0	—		—		26	0
Career total			384	25	4	0	53	6	102	9	13	2	556	41

=== International ===
Appearances and goals by national team and year
National team	Year	Apps	Goals
Brazil	2003	5	0
Brazil	2004	1	0
Brazil	2006	2	0
Brazil	2010	1	0
Brazil	2011	4	0
Brazil	2012	3	0
Brazil	2013	1	0
Total		17	0

== Honours ==
Coritiba

- Campeonato Paranaense: 2003, 2004

Sevilla

- Copa del Rey: 2006–07, 2009–10
- UEFA Cup: 2005–06, 2006–07
- UEFA Super Cup: 2006

Barcelona

- La Liga: 2010–11, 2012–13, 2014–2015, 2015–16
- Copa del Rey: 2011–12, 2014–15, 2015–16
- Supercopa de España: 2010, 2011
- UEFA Champions League: 2010–11, 2014–15
- UEFA Super Cup: 2011
- FIFA Club World Cup: 2011, 2015

Beşiktaş

- Süper Lig: 2016–17
- Turkish Super Cup runner-up: 2017

Athletico Paranaense

- Campeonato Paranaense: 2020

Brazil

- Copa América: 2004

Brazil U20

- FIFA U-20 World Cup: 2003

Individual

- FIFA Club World Cup top scorer: 2011
- Süper Lig Team of the Season: 2016–17, 2017–18
