= Jaume Delgado =

Spanish footballer (born 1983)

Jaume
Personal information
- Full name: Jaume Delgado Catevilla
- Date of birth: 13 May 1983 (age 43)
- Place of birth: Barcelona, Spain
- Height: 1.78 m (5 ft 10 in)
- Position: Midfielder

Youth career
- Espanyol

Senior career*
Years	Team	Apps	(Gls)
2001–2004	Espanyol B	63	(0)
2004–2005	Figueres	28	(0)
2005–2006	Terrassa	8	(0)
2006–2008	Logroñés	72	(2)
2008–2011	Lleida	107	(3)
2011–2012	Lleida Esportiu	35	(0)
2012–2014	Alavés	54	(0)
2014–2015	Reus	48	(2)
Total		415	(7)
- * Club domestic league appearances and goals

Jaume Delgado Catevilla (born 13 May 1983), known simply as Jaume, is a Spanish retired footballer who played as a midfielder.

== Football career ==
Born in Barcelona, Catalonia, Jaume made his senior debut with local RCD Espanyol B. He spent the vast majority of his career with clubs from his native region, only leaving in the summer of 2006 when he signed with CD Logroñés and in the 2012 off-season when he joined Deportivo Alavés.

In the 2012–13 campaign, Jaume was an ever-present figure for Alavés, appearing in 45 matches all competitions comprised (40 in the league including the playoffs) as his team achieved promotion to Segunda División. He made his professional debut on 16 August 2013 at the age of 30, in a 0–1 away defeat against Girona FC.
