= Tito Vilanova =

Spanish football player and manager (1968–2014)

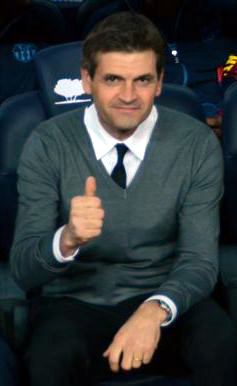
- Vilanova in 2012

Personal information
- Full name: Francesc Vilanova Bayó
- Date of birth: 17 September 1968
- Place of birth: Bellcaire d'Empordà, Spain
- Date of death: 25 April 2014 (aged 45)
- Place of death: Barcelona, Spain
- Height: 1.82 m (5 ft 11 1/2 in)
- Position: Midfielder

Youth career
- 1984–1987: Barcelona

Senior career*
Years	Team	Apps	(Gls)
1987–1988	Barcelona C	35	(3)
1988–1990	Barcelona B	52	(6)
1990–1992	Figueres	72	(6)
1992–1995	Celta	26	(1)
1995–1996	Badajoz	33	(2)
1996–1997	Mallorca	10	(0)
1997–1998	Lleida	21	(3)
1998–2000	Elche	63	(6)
2000–2001	Gramenet	28	(2)
Total		340	(29)

Managerial career
- 2002–2003: Barcelona (youth)
- 2003–2004: Palafrugell
- 2005–2006: Figueres
- 2006–2007: Terrassa
- 2007–2008: Barcelona B (assistant)
- 2008–2012: Barcelona (assistant)
- 2012–2013: Barcelona
- * Club domestic league appearances and goals

Francesc "Tito" Vilanova Bayó (17 September 1968 – 25 April 2014) was a Spanish professional football central midfielder and manager.

After a career which consisted of a total of 26 La Liga matches in three seasons, all with Celta, he went on to work with Barcelona as an assistant coach under Pep Guardiola, being part of the squad that had won 14 titles.

Vilanova was appointed as first-team manager in 2012, winning La Liga in his only season. He stepped down in July 2013 due to ill health, and died the next year from throat cancer.

== Playing career ==
Born in Bellcaire d'Empordà, Girona, Catalonia, Vilanova emerged in the youth ranks of local FC Barcelona, but left the La Liga giants in 1990 unable to break through into the first team. His next club was also in his native region, UE Figueres, with the player helping to its best-ever Segunda División classification in the 1991–92 campaign (third place); the team would eventually face Cádiz CF in the promotion play-offs, losing 3–1 on aggregate.

Subsequently, Vilanova moved to the top division with RC Celta de Vigo, but appeared rarely over three full seasons, returning to division two in 1995 and representing CD Badajoz, RCD Mallorca – contributing ten matches as the Balearic Islands side promoted to the top flight – UE Lleida and Elche CF, retiring in December 2001 with lowly UDA Gramenet.

During his time at Lleida, in a 1998 Copa Catalunya game against Barcelona, coached by José Mourinho who swapped responsibilities with head coach Louis van Gaal during the tournament, Vilanova scored a goal, becoming the first player to net against a team directed by the Portuguese.

== Coaching career ==
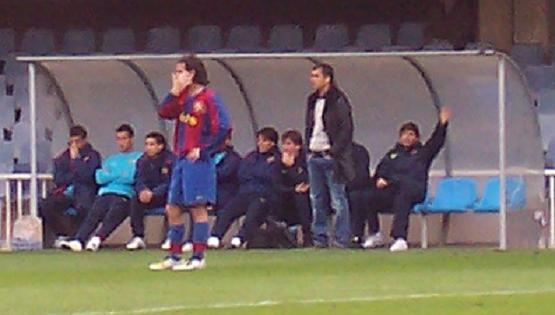
Vilanova (far right) as an assistant manager of Barcelona B

Vilanova started his coaching career in 2003–04, being in charge of Tercera División side FC Palafrugell and suffering relegation to Primera Catalana. After working as technical director at Terrassa FC he was appointed assistant manager at FC Barcelona B, under manager Pep Guardiola, with the team in the fourth tier.

In the summer of 2008, after leading the reserves to promotion to Segunda División B, Vilanova and Guardiola were assigned to the first team, replacing Dutch duo Frank Rijkaard and Johan Neeskens. His first year at the Camp Nou was the most successful in the club's history, with the side winning six major trophies and becoming the first in Spain to conquer the Copa del Rey, league and UEFA Champions League titles (the treble) in the same season.

Tito was the first person who had faith in me because at the time, I was a substitute or didn't play, and he was the one who made me starter in the under-16 category.

— Lionel Messi

On 27 April 2012, at the press conference in which Barcelona confirmed Guardiola's departure, it was also announced that Vilanova would be his successor; on 15 June, he signed a two-year contract. The same year, Lionel Messi revealed that Vilanova was the first coach at the club to trust him, and made him a starter for their under-16 teams.

Vilanova managed to field 11 academy graduates at the same time in a league game against Levante UD on 25 November 2012, after Dani Alves left with an injury early on and was replaced by Martín Montoya. His team went on to lose only eight competitive matches during the campaign, scoring at least once in every league fixture and winning their 22nd domestic championship by a record margin of 15 points, totalling 100 in the process.

== Health issues and death ==
On 19 December 2012, Barcelona announced that Vilanova was suffering from parotid gland cancer for the second time. He was first diagnosed on 22 November of the previous year.

Vilanova underwent surgery on 20 December 2012, subsequently being in chemotherapy and radiotherapy treatment for around six weeks. Assistant Jordi Roura took over as head coach, with Vilanova returning to the bench in late March 2013.

On 19 July 2013, Vilanova resigned as Barcelona manager as he relapsed from his condition, stating that the related treatment was not compatible with the status of a professional manager. He died on 25 April 2014 due to complications from cancer, at the age of 45 after suffering a relapse the previous week.

== Personal life ==
Vilanova married his long-time girlfriend Montse Chaure in 1992. The couple had two children, daughter Carlota and son Adrià, with the latter also being involved in Barcelona's youth system.

In 2013, while Vilanova was in New York City for his cancer treatment, Guardiola was also living in the city on a sabbatical. He was disappointed that Guardiola only came to see him once, stating: "He's my friend and I needed him, but he wasn't there for me."

== Honours ==
=== Manager ===
Barcelona

- La Liga: 2012–13

Individual

- Miguel Muñoz Trophy: 2012–13

== Managerial statistics ==
Team	From	To	Record							
Team	From	To	G	W	D	L	GF	GA	GD	Win %
Barcelona	1 July 2012	19 July 2013	45	34	6	5	121	51	+70	75.56
