= Fábio Coentrão =

Portuguese footballer (born 1988)

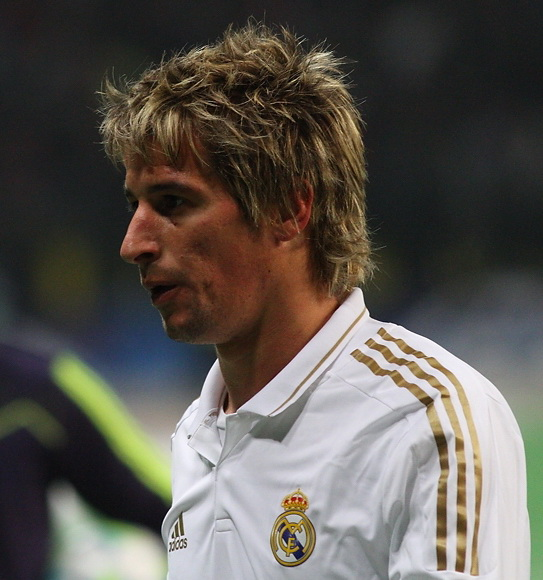
- Coentrão with Real Madrid in 2012

Personal information
- Full name: Fábio Alexandre da Silva Coentrão
- Date of birth: 11 March 1988 (age 38)
- Place of birth: Vila do Conde, Portugal
- Height: 1.78 m (5 ft 10 in)
- Positions: Left-back; winger

Youth career
- 1999–2006: Rio Ave

Senior career*
Years	Team	Apps	(Gls)
2005–2007	Rio Ave	29	(5)
2007–2011	Benfica	52	(2)
2008	→ Nacional (loan)	16	(4)
2008	→ Zaragoza (loan)	1	(0)
2009	→ Rio Ave (loan)	16	(3)
2011–2018	Real Madrid	58	(1)
2015–2016	→ Monaco (loan)	15	(3)
2017–2018	→ Sporting CP (loan)	25	(1)
2018–2019	Rio Ave	21	(0)
2020–2021	Rio Ave	13	(2)
Total		246	(21)

International career
2005	Portugal U18	1	(0)
2006–2007	Portugal U19	10	(5)
2007	Portugal U20	7	(4)
2009	Portugal U21	7	(6)
2010	Portugal U23	1	(0)
2009–2017	Portugal	52	(5)
Medal record
Men's football
Representing Portugal
UEFA European Championship
Third place	2012 Poland-Ukraine
- * Club domestic league appearances and goals

Fábio Alexandre da Silva Coentrão (Portuguese pronunciation: [ˈfaβju kwẽˈtɾɐ̃w]; born 11 March 1988) is a Portuguese former professional footballer. Mainly a left-back, he also operated as a winger and occasionally as a defensive midfielder.

After starting playing professionally with Rio Ave, he signed for Benfica at 19, going on to be loaned several times before becoming an important member of the first team as a left-back. He joined Real Madrid in 2011, and retired ten years later at his first club.

A Portugal international over eight years, Coentrão represented the nation in two World Cups and Euro 2012.

== Club career ==
=== Rio Ave ===
Born in Vila do Conde, Coentrão grew up in the Caxinas fishing neighbourhood, as did his long-time international teammates Bruno Alves and Hélder Postiga. He joined his hometown's Rio Ave F.C. in 2004 at the age of 16, playing three Primeira Liga games in the following season for a northern side that would be relegated. In 2006–07 he established himself as first-choice, as Rio Ave barely missed promotion back and had a good run in the Taça de Portugal, ended by Sporting CP with a 2–1 win in Lisbon; whilst playing for the club, he earned the nickname "Figo das Caxinas".

After that season, where he was voted the divisions' Breakthrough Player of the Year, many clubs showed interest in Coentrão, most notably Sporting and S.L. Benfica, with him choosing the latter in July 2007. His playing style was likened to that of Arjen Robben by World Soccer Magazine, in its 50 World Talents 2007 issue.

=== Benfica ===
On 1 January 2008, having received insignificant playing opportunities at Benfica, Coentrão joined Madeira's C.D. Nacional on loan until the end of the season. On 3 May, he scored twice in a 3–0 away victory against already crowned league champions FC Porto.

In the summer of 2008, Coentrão transferred to Real Zaragoza, recently relegated into Spain's Segunda División. After almost no appearances during the campaign, however, he returned to Portugal and Rio Ave in January 2009, still owned by Benfica. On 15 February he scored following an individual effort, albeit in a 3–1 loss at Porto.

Coentrão extended his contract in late October 2009 until 2015, with a release clause of €30 million. On 2 December, having played some matches as a left-back, he scored his first goal in European competition, against FC BATE Borisov of Belarus in a 2–1 away win in the group stage of the UEFA Europa League.

On 10 February 2010, Benfica sold 20% of Coentrão's economic rights on any future transfer to a third party owner, Benfica Stars Fund, along with other teammates. He was tagged at €15 million, with the fund paying €3 million. During that season, he had a breakthrough year, appearing in a total of 45 games to win the league and the Taça da Liga; for his performances, he was voted Portuguese League Breakthrough Player of the Year.

On 27 September 2010, fully established with both his club and the national team, the 22-year-old Coentrão renewed his link until 2016. On 2 November he scored his first career brace, helping to a 4–3 home defeat of Olympique Lyonnais in the group phase of the UEFA Champions League – in a 67-minute fast break, he combined with Carlos Martins to make it 4–0 for the hosts.

=== Real Madrid ===
On 5 July 2011, after extensive negotiations, Benfica and Real Madrid reached an agreement in principle over the transfer of Coentrão, who signed a six-year contract the same day for €30 million– Ezequiel Garay went in the other direction as part of the deal. He made his debut in a pre-season friendly against the Los Angeles Galaxy on the 16th, creating an assist for Karim Benzema. His first two official games were against FC Barcelona in the Supercopa de España: in the first leg, he came on as a substitute for Sami Khedira in the second half of a 2–2 home draw and played as a defensive midfielder, and he started at left-back in the second match, a 3–2 loss at the Camp Nou.

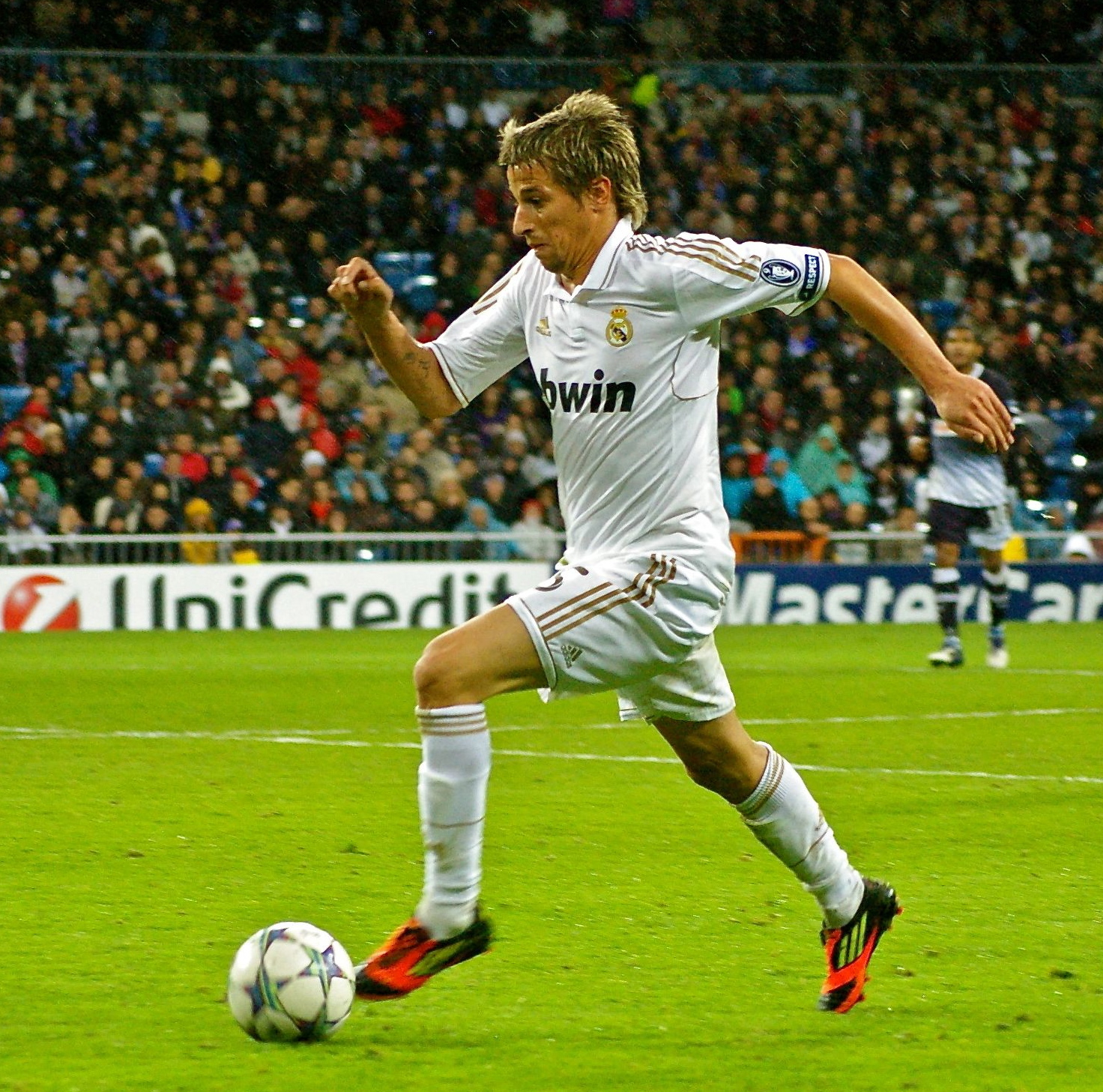
Coentrão in action for Real Madrid in the 2011–12 UEFA Champions League

Coentrão made his La Liga debut on 28 August 2011 at former club Zaragoza, appearing as a central midfielder in a 6–0 rout (90 minutes played). While he featured mostly in these positions, he was also deployed by manager José Mourinho as a right-back, against Sporting de Gijón on 3 December and against Barcelona the following week, winning the league in his first year.

In the last minutes of the second matchday in the 2012–13 season, Coentrão was sent off after insulting referee Pérez Lasa whilst on the substitutes bench, in an eventual 2–1 defeat at Getafe CF. He subsequently received a four-match ban.

Coentrão scored his first goal with Real Madrid on 16 December 2012, netting after a Cristiano Ronaldo pass to help the hosts come from behind against RCD Espanyol, as the game eventually ended 2–2. On 2 September of the following year, Manchester United launched a late loan bid for him on transfer deadline day. It was accepted by the Spaniards, but the deal fell through when they failed to secure a replacement in Guilherme Siqueira from Granada CF, who subsequently joined Benfica on loan.

Coentrão started the play that led to Gareth Bale's individual effort for the 2–1 winner over Barcelona in the final of the Copa del Rey. He also started both legs of the Champions League semi-final against holders FC Bayern Munich as Real Madrid dismantled the opposition 5–0 on aggregate en route to their tenth European title, La Décima.

Still under manager Carlo Ancelotti, Coentrão was sparingly played in the 2014–15 campaign mainly due to injuries, with only five league starts out of nine appearances. On 26 August 2015, it was announced he was loaned to AS Monaco FC in a season-long move. He made his competitive debut against Gazélec Ajaccio on 13 September, replacing Adama Traoré in an eventual 1–0 away win, and scored his first goal for his new team 11 days later to help the visitors come from behind at Montpellier HSC to win 3–2.

As Madrid won the league championship in 2016–17, in which Coentrão contributed with just three appearances. He himself admitted not being fit enough to represent the club; in the season's Champions League he appeared in two group stage games, and his team won the competition for the second consecutive time.

On 5 July 2017, Coentrão was loaned to Sporting in a season-long move, despite having stated that in Portugal he would only play for Benfica.

=== Rio Ave return ===
After terminating his contract with Real Madrid, Coentrão signed with Rio Ave for one season on 31 August 2018. He received 11 yellow cards and two red, was released on 30 June 2019 and did not find a new club for the start of 2019–20.

On 29 January 2020, Coentrão announced his retirement from professional football. In October, however, he agreed to a new one-year deal at the Estádio dos Arcos.

== International career ==
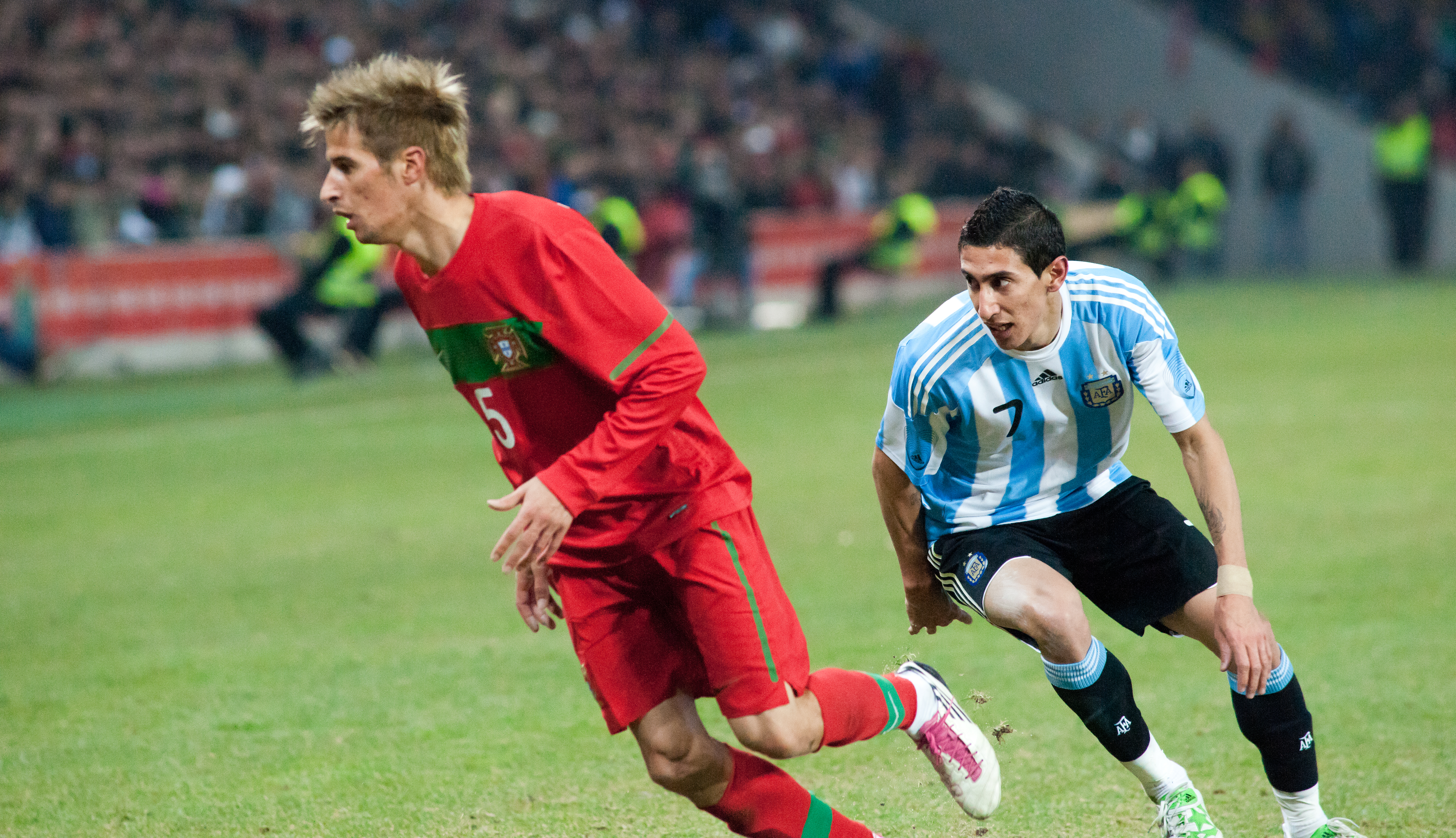
Coentrão (left) marking Ángel Di María in a friendly match against Argentina on 9 February 2011

An international for Portugal at youth level, Coentrão was voted MVP in the 2007 Madeira Cup for the under-20 team, also being crowned the competition's top scorer. Subsequently, he represented the nation in the 2007 FIFA U-20 World Cup and, two years later, made his under-21 debut, notably taking part in the Toulon Tournament and scoring a hat-trick in the 6–0 group stage rout of Qatar.

After consistent performances at Benfica, although he started rarely in the early 2009–10, Coentrão earned his first senior call-up in November 2009, for the decisive 2010 FIFA World Cup qualification playoffs against Bosnia and Herzegovina, and made his debut in the first leg on 14 November at the Estádio da Luz, playing 21 minutes in the 1–0 win.

Coentrão was chosen for Carlos Queiroz's squad of 23 for the final stages, starting as left-back ahead of another adapted player, Duda. He played all the matches in South Africa, in an eventual round of 16 exit.

On 10 August 2011, Coentrão scored his first international goal, netting through a rare header in a 5–0 victory over Luxembourg. He played all the games and minutes at UEFA Euro 2012, acting as left-back for the semi-finalists.

Coentrão suffered an injury in the second half of Portugal's first game at the 2014 World Cup, against Germany, and was ruled out for the remainder of the tournament. He played a key role in a 2–1 home defeat of Serbia on 29 March 2015, which put them top of the Euro 2016 qualifying group, crossing for the opening goal by a Ricardo Carvalho header and then scoring the winner from João Moutinho's pass.

Coentrão missed Euro 2016, which Portugal won, due to a thigh injury, contracted in training with Monaco. He returned to action after 697 days for a 2018 World Cup qualifier against Hungary, but was stretchered off in the first half of an eventual 1–0 win in Budapest.

Coentrão was named in a preliminary 35-man squad for the 2018 World Cup in Russia, but he did not make the final cut.

== Personal life ==
Coentrão's second cousin, Rui, was also a footballer in the same position. He spent most of his career with Varzim SC, and was a youth international.

After retiring from professional football, Coentrão decided to become a shipowner fisherman, following in the footsteps of his father. He told Empower Brands Channel: "Life in the sea is not a shame, as many people think. It is a job like any other. Not only that, the sea is beautiful and we need it. People who love the sea and who want to experience the sea need to follow their dream. It is also a job for the new generations. My father had a boat, he used to fish and I always went with him as a child. My life was the sea... the sea and fishing. Of course, I knew that football would one day end and that I should take a new direction in my life. And my happiness is this boat and this is the life I want to lead."

== Career statistics ==
=== Club ===
Appearances and goals by club, season and competition
Club	Season	League			National cup (Note: Includes Supercopa de España, Supertaça Cândido de Oliveira.)		League cup		Europe		Other (Note: Includes UEFA Super Cup, FIFA Club World Cup.)		Total	
Club	Season	Division	Apps	Goals	Apps	Goals	Apps	Goals	Apps	Goals	Apps	Goals	Apps	Goals
Rio Ave	2004–05	Primeira Liga	1	0	0	0	—		—		—		1	0
Rio Ave	2005–06	Primeira Liga	3	1	1	0	—		—		—		4	1
Rio Ave	2006–07	Liga de Honra	25	4	2	0	—		—		—		27	4
Rio Ave	Total		29	5	3	0	0	0	0	0	0	0	32	5
Benfica	2007–08	Primeira Liga	3	0	0	0	3	0	1	0	0	0	7	0
Benfica	2009–10	Primeira Liga	26	0	2	1	4	1	13	1	0	0	45	3
Benfica	2010–11	Primeira Liga	23	2	6	1	2	0	14	2	0	0	45	5
Benfica	Total		52	2	8	2	9	1	28	3	0	0	97	8
Nacional (loan)	2007–08	Primeira Liga	16	4	0	0	0	0	0	0	0	0	16	4
Zaragoza (loan)	2008–09	Segunda División	1	0	0	0	—		0	0	0	0	1	0
Rio Ave (loan)	2008–09	Primeira Liga	16	3	0	0	0	0	0	0	0	0	16	3
Real Madrid	2011–12	La Liga	20	0	5	0	—		8	0	0	0	33	0
Real Madrid	2012–13	La Liga	16	1	6	0	—		8	0	0	0	30	1
Real Madrid	2013–14	La Liga	10	0	4	0	—		6	0	0	0	20	0
Real Madrid	2014–15	La Liga	9	0	2	0	—		4	0	2	0	17	0
Real Madrid	2016–17	La Liga	3	0	1	0	—		2	0	0	0	6	0
Real Madrid	2018–19	La Liga	0	0	0	0	—		0	0	0	0	0	0
Real Madrid	Total		58	1	18	0	—		28	0	2	0	106	1
Monaco (loan)	2015–16	Ligue 1	15	3	1	0	0	0	3	0	—		19	3
Sporting CP (loan)	2017–18	Primeira Liga	25	1	5	0	3	0	11	0	—		44	1
Rio Ave	2018–19	Primeira Liga	21	0	1	0	1	0	—				23	0
Rio Ave	2020–21	Primeira Liga	13	2	1	0	0	0	—				14	2
Rio Ave	Total		34	2	2	0	1	0	—				37	2
Career total			244	21	37	2	13	1	70	3	2	0	368	27

=== International ===
Appearances and goals by national team and year
National team	Year	Apps	Goals
Portugal	2009	1	0
Portugal	2010	10	0
Portugal	2011	8	1
Portugal	2012	12	0
Portugal	2013	11	1
Portugal	2014	5	2
Portugal	2015	4	1
Portugal	2016	0	0
Portugal	2017	1	0
Total		52	5

Scores and results list Portugal's goal tally first, score column indicates score after each Coentrão goal.

List of international goals scored by Fábio Coentrão
No.	Date	Venue	Opponent	Score	Result	Competition
1	10 August 2011	Estádio Algarve, Algarve, Portugal	Luxembourg	3–0	5–0	Friendly
2	22 March 2013	Ramat Gan Stadium, Ramat Gan, Israel	Israel	3–3	3–3	2014 World Cup qualification
3	5 March 2014	Dr. Magalhães Pessoa, Leiria, Portugal	Cameroon	3–1	5–1	Friendly
4	10 June 2014	MetLife, East Rutherford, United States	Republic of Ireland	5–1	5–1	Friendly
5	29 March 2015	Estádio da Luz, Lisbon, Portugal	Serbia	2–1	2–1	Euro 2016 qualifying

== Honours ==
Benfica

- Primeira Liga: 2009–10
- Taça da Liga: 2009–10, 2010–11
- Supertaça Cândido de Oliveira runner-up: 2010

Real Madrid

- La Liga: 2011–12, 2016–17
- Copa del Rey: 2013–14
- Supercopa de España: 2012
- UEFA Champions League: 2013–14, 2016–17
- UEFA Super Cup: 2014
- FIFA Club World Cup: 2014, 2016

Sporting CP

- Taça da Liga: 2017–18
- Taça de Portugal runner-up: 2017–18

Individual

- Liga de Honra Breakthrough Player of the Year: 2006–07
- Primeira Liga Young Player of the Month: October 2009, March 2010, April 2010, September 2010
- Primeira Liga Breakthrough Player of the Year: 2009–10
- L'Équipe Ideal Eleven: 2010
- Cosme Damião Award – Footballer of the Year: 2011
- UEFA European Championship Team of the Tournament: 2012

Preceded by Hulk	Portuguese League Breakthrough Player of the Year; 2009–10	Succeeded by Incumbent
Preceded by Miguel Vítor	Benfica Award for Breakthrough Player of the Year; 2009	Succeeded by Incumbent
