= 2011–12 Real Madrid CF season =

108th season in existence of Real Madrid CF

Real Madrid
2011–12 season
- President: Florentino Pérez
- Head coach: José Mourinho
- Stadium: Santiago Bernabéu
- La Liga: 1st
- Copa del Rey: Quarter-finals
- Supercopa de España: Runners-up
- UEFA Champions League: Semi-finals
- Top goalscorer: League: Cristiano Ronaldo (46); All: Cristiano Ronaldo (60)
- Highest home attendance: 83,500 vs Barcelona (10 December 2011) vs Málaga (3 January 2012) vs Barcelona (18 January 2012)
- Lowest home attendance: 52,000 vs Ponferradina (20 December 2011)
- Biggest win: Real Madrid 7–1 Osasuna
- Biggest defeat: Real Madrid 1–3 Barcelona
Home colours	Away colours	Third colours

The 2011–12 season was the 108th season in Real Madrid Club de Fútbol's history and their 81st consecutive season in La Liga, the top division of Spanish football. It covered a period from 1 July 2011 to 30 June 2012.

Real Madrid began the season finishing runners-up in the Supercopa de España to Barcelona, losing 5–4 on aggregate. The team then went on to produce a magnificent season, winning a record 32nd La Liga title and setting a number of league records, including 100 points amassed in a single season, a total of 121 goals scored, a goal difference of +89, 16 away games won, and 32 wins overall. They also competed in the UEFA Champions League for the 15th successive season, losing in the semi-finals to Bayern Munich on penalties (after a 3–3 aggregate tie) in heartbreaking fashion. Madrid entered the Copa del Rey as the defending champions, but lost 3–4 on aggregate in the quarter-finals to Barcelona. In the same season, Cristiano Ronaldo became the fastest player to reach 100 goals scored in Spanish league history. In reaching 101 goals in 92 games, Ronaldo surpassed Real Madrid legend Ferenc Puskás, who scored 100 goals in 105 matches. Ronaldo set a new club mark for individual goals scored in one year (60) and became the first player ever to score against all 19 opposition teams in a single season.

The season has been often termed by some newspapers as "La Liga de los Récords" (Spanish for "The League of the Records") as Real Madrid broke several long-standing La Liga records, the most prominent being the highest number of points in a single La Liga season. Their total of 100 was one point better than the previous record set by Barcelona in the 2009–10 season. Real Madrid also recorded the most goals in a league season with 121, surpassing the previous record held by the Real Madrid side that scored 107 goals during the 1989–90 season.

== Season overview ==
=== Pre-season ===
Real Madrid commenced their summer transfer activity on 9 May, signing Turkish central midfielder Nuri Şahin for six seasons from Borussia Dortmund on a transfer reported to be worth €10 million. Versatile Turkish midfielder Hamit Altıntop was signed for four seasons on a free transfer from Bayern Munich on 19 May, but was discovered to have a prolapsed disc on 23 June, undergoing a successful operation four days later. The club announced on 21 May that veteran Polish goalkeeper Jerzy Dudek's contract would not be renewed; he subsequently retired. Former Castilla winger José Callejón was brought back after three seasons at Espanyol for a reported fee of €5 million on 23 May.

Real Madrid fired Director General Jorge Valdano on 25 May after a strained relationship over sporting decisions between him and manager José Mourinho. President Florentino Pérez supported Mourinho's request to "be able to manage the team with autonomy" in response to tensions during the previous season's winter transfer window and a public feud regarding Karim Benzema following a 1–1 draw against Almería. Valdano was reported to be paid €3.5 million to release him from the remaining two years on his contract and was replaced by José Ángel Sánchez. Mourinho subsequently became head of football operations in addition to his role as head coach with former player and special adviser to Pérez Zinedine Zidane as the new director of football for the first team.

Real Madrid continued their transfer activity on 27 June, signing teenage French central defender Raphaël Varane from Lens for six seasons on a reported €10 million transfer. On 1 July, Royston Drenthe and David Mateos returned from their loan spells at Hércules and AEK Athens, respectively, while Emmanuel Adebayor returned to Manchester City following a six-month loan. Mateos was loaned out ten days later to Real Zaragoza with Zaragoza having an option to purchase the player permanently at the end of the season, and Drenthe was loaned to Everton late on the final day of the transfer window. Portuguese wingback Fábio Coentrão transferred from Benfica for €30 million on 5 July and signed a six-year contract.

Real Madrid traveled to the UCLA campus in Los Angeles, California, on 11 July to prepare for friendlies against the LA Galaxy, Guadalajara and Philadelphia Union in the World Football Challenge. Castilla players Jesús Fernández, Tomás Mejías, Jorge Casado, Nacho, Jesé and Joselu accompanied the first team to the United States. On 12 July, the contracts of Pepe and Sergio Ramos were extended to 2016 and 2017, respectively, and Nuri Şahin suffered a Grade I sprain on the internal lateral ligament in his left knee during the first day of training, causing him to miss the entire pre-season. On 17 July, defender Ezequiel Garay transferred to Benfica for an undisclosed fee. Real Madrid's pre-season began with a 4–1 victory over Major League Soccer (MLS) team LA Galaxy, with goals from Callejón, Joselu, Cristiano Ronaldo and Benzema. Four days later in San Diego against Mexican Primera División side Guadalajara, Ronaldo scored a second half hat-trick over a nine-minute span for a 3–0 victory. Real Madrid completed the World Football Challenge atop the table following a 2–1 win over Philadelphia Union, with early goals from Callejón and Mesut Özil. They officially won the tournament via goal differential when Manchester United defeated Barcelona 2–1 on 30 July. Ronaldo finished as the tournament's top scorer with four goals.

Real Madrid started the European leg of their pre-season world tour with a triumph over newly promoted Bundesliga team Hertha BSC on 27 July in front of a sold out Olympiastadion. Patrick Ebert opened the scoring for Hertha, but Ronaldo equalized from a long-range free kick and Benzema added two goals for a 3–1 victory. Three days later Real Madrid defeated Championship side Leicester City 2–1 to win the npower Challenge Cup. Callejón scored the opening goal and Benzema converted a rebound following a shot off the goalpost by Marcelo before Lloyd Dyer added a late consolation goal.

José Mourinho's five-game touchline ban in the UEFA Champions League due to accusatory statements following the first leg of the previous season's Champions League semi-final was partially upheld following an appeal to UEFA on 29 July. He was originally suspended for five matches, with the final game suspended for a probational period of three years, and fined €50,000 for accusing Barcelona of receiving favorable treatment from UEFA and for severely criticizing German referee Wolfgang Stark. After serving the first game of his suspension in the second leg, Mourinho had the remaining four matches of his ban reduced to a two-game suspension with a potential two further games over a three-year probationary period. The original fine to Mourinho was upheld along with a €20,000 fine assessed to Real Madrid for crowd trouble.

The club traveled to Guangzhou, China, directly from Leicester on 1 August, and signed a letter of intent the following day with Guangzhou Evergrande involving club cooperation, potential player exchanges, and the opening of the largest football academy in China. On 3 August, Real Madrid defeated Chinese Super League leaders Guangzhou Evergrande 7–1, with goals from Sami Khedira, Özil, Benzema twice, Ronaldo, Jesé, and Ángel Di María. The following day, attacking midfielder Sergio Canales joined Valencia on loan for two seasons with Valencia retaining a purchase option of €12 million at the end of each season. Real Madrid concluded their pre-season world tour with all victories on 6 August, defeating Tianjin Teda 6–0 with goals from Kaká, Di María, Gonzalo Higuaín, Ronaldo and a double by Benzema.

=== August ===
Real Madrid opened their competitive season with a 2–2 draw at home in the first leg of the 2011 Supercopa de España against Barcelona on 14 August. Özil scored after 13 minutes following an assist from Benzema, but goals from David Villa and Lionel Messi against the run of play gave Barcelona the lead at halftime. Xabi Alonso shot through traffic during a corner sequence for the equalizer nine minutes into the second half. Three days later in the return leg at Camp Nou, Barcelona defeated Real Madrid 3–2 to win 5–4 on aggregate. Andrés Iniesta beat the offside trap and scored first for Barcelona, but Ronaldo redirected a cross to equalize five minutes later. Messi scored just before halftime following a failed clearance of a corner kick by Real Madrid and a subsequent backheel assist from Gerard Piqué to give Barcelona a 2–1 lead at halftime. Benzema leveled the score late in the second half following a scramble from a corner kick, but an Adriano cross allowed Messi to score the winning goal in the 88th minute. Marcelo received a straight red card in stoppage time for a tackle on Cesc Fàbregas, creating an ensuing scuffle between the two sides that led to Mourinho confronting Barcelona assistant coach Tito Vilanova with a poke in the eye and expulsions of Villa and Özil. Six days later, the Royal Spanish Football Federation opened disciplinary investigations against both Mourinho and Vilanova that could have potentially resulted in a 12-game suspension for Mourinho but instead suspended him for two future Supercopa de España matches and fined €600. Real Madrid was additionally fined €180.

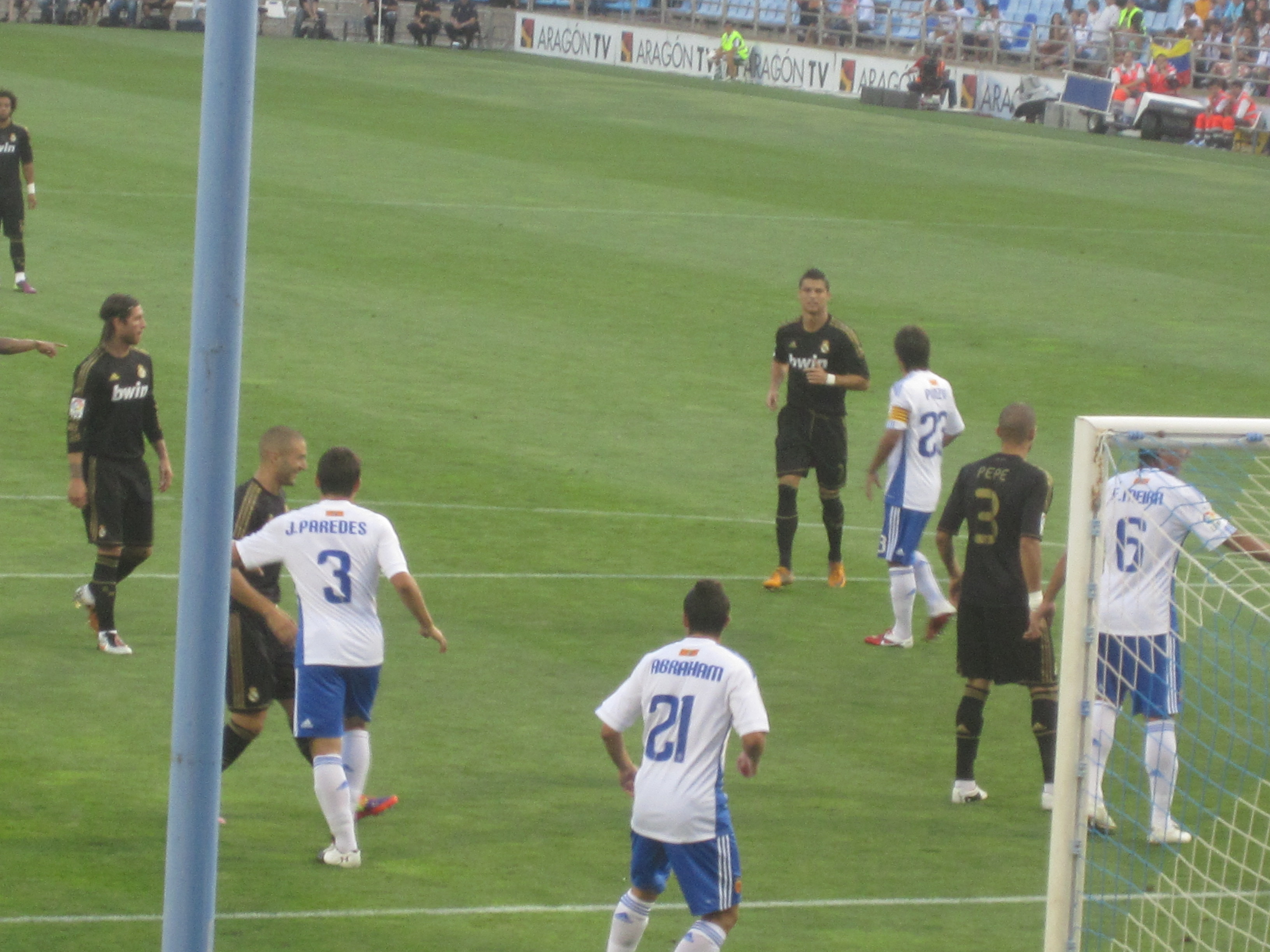
Real Madrid players sporting their brand new black kits in an away match against Zaragoza

Real Madrid's La Liga campaign was scheduled to begin on 21 August at home against Athletic Bilbao, but the Spanish Footballers' Association, with representation from all 42 teams in the top two divisions, unanimously elected to strike after failing to reach a collective bargaining agreement with the Liga de Fútbol Profesional, causing the postponement of the first weekend of fixtures. The team won their seventh consecutive Santiago Bernabéu Trophy, defeating Turkish Süper Lig side Galatasaray on 24 August. Before the match, Real Madrid officially presented their five new summer signings and honored their three youth team players on the Spanish under-19 squad that won the 2011 UEFA European Under-19 Football Championship. Selçuk İnan scored early for Galatasaray from close range, but a pair of assists from man of the match Xabi Alonso to Sergio Ramos and Benzema led Real Madrid to a 2–1 victory in the annual friendly. Real Madrid's La Liga season began with a 0–6 win at Real Zaragoza on 28 August, with goals from Marcelo, Alonso, Kaká and a hat-trick by Ronaldo, including his 100th goal as a Real Madrid player. The win was the most lopsided away victory on opening day in Spanish top flight history.

On 31 August, the final day of the summer transfer window, Real Madrid loaned out midfielders Pedro León, Fernando Gago and Royston Drenthe. Pedro León joined Getafe, the team he was purchased from a year ago, and Gago joined Roma, with both Getafe and Roma retaining the option to acquire their respective player for €6 million at the end of the season. Drenthe joined Everton for a season-long loan in a deal that was finalized late on deadline day.

=== September ===
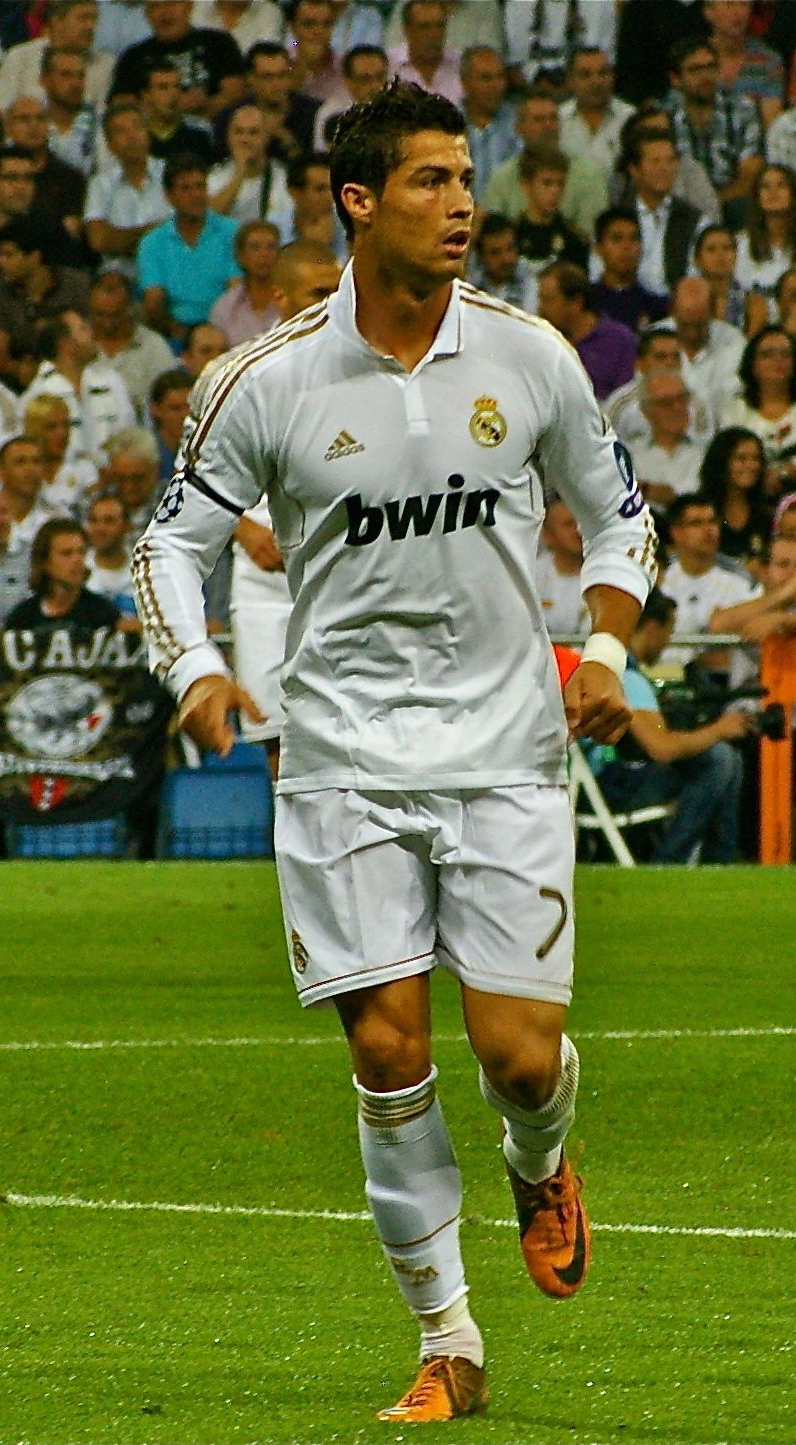
The season's record-breaking top scorer Cristiano Ronaldo in action against Ajax

Real Madrid's first La Liga home match resulted in a 4–2 victory over local rivals Getafe on 10 September. Benzema scored his first two goals in La Liga while Ronaldo converted a penalty and Higuaín added a late goal. The victory boosted Real Madrid to a two-point advantage over Barcelona, as Barcelona drew 2–2 earlier in the day at Real Sociedad. Four days later, Real Madrid defeated Dinamo Zagreb 1–0 in on Matchday 1 of the UEFA Champions League despite Mourinho serving his second of three touchline bans in the competition and a second yellow card to Marcelo for diving in the penalty area. Di María scored the lone goal early in the second half, while Ronaldo received stitches to his right ankle after the match. The injury forced Ronaldo out of the starting lineup against Levante on 18 September, a match Real Madrid lost 1–0 on a second half counterattack goal from Arouna Koné. Real Madrid played with a man down when Khedira received his second yellow card in the 40th minute for defending Di María from Sergio Ballesteros during a fracas; Mourinho later commented Khedira "fell for the trap." Three days later Real Madrid again failed to score, drawing 0–0 at Racing Santander in a match in which Varane made his official debut. On 24 September, the team defeated Rayo Vallecano 6–2 at home. Michu scored for the visitors 17 seconds into the match following an intercepted backpass from Lassana Diarra, but goals from Ronaldo and Higuaín lifted Real Madrid to a 2–1 halftime lead. Ronaldo and Michu scored again early in the second half shortly before a second yellow card to Di María for an intentional handball. Despite the numerical disadvantage, Ronaldo completed his hat-trick and Varane and Benzema added goals in the victory. Varane, at 18 years and 152 days, became the youngest foreign player to score in a competitive match for Real Madrid. Hamit Altıntop made his official debut in a 3–0 victory over Ajax on Matchday 2 of the Champions League on 27 September. Ronaldo, Kaká, and Benzema each scored a goal and provided an assist.

=== October ===
Real Madrid defeated Espanyol away 0–4 on 2 October. Higuaín scored a hat-trick and Callejón scored his first official goal for Real Madrid. Higuaín added another hat-trick, his third in two weeks including one for Argentina, and Kaká scored a goal on 15 October in a 4–1 victory over Real Betis. Despite his recent goalscoring form, Higuaín was dropped from the starting lineup in favor of Benzema for the Champions League match against Olympique Lyonnais three days later. Mourinho returned from suspension and guided Real Madrid to a 4–0 victory, inflicting Lyon with their largest ever defeat in the Champions League. Benzema finished Ronaldo's flick from an Özil corner and then assisted Khedira for his first competitive goal at Real Madrid. Lyon goalkeeper Hugo Lloris redirected a cross by Özil for an own goal, and Sergio Ramos completed the scoring from a Kaká corner. The win lifted Real Madrid five points clear atop Group D.

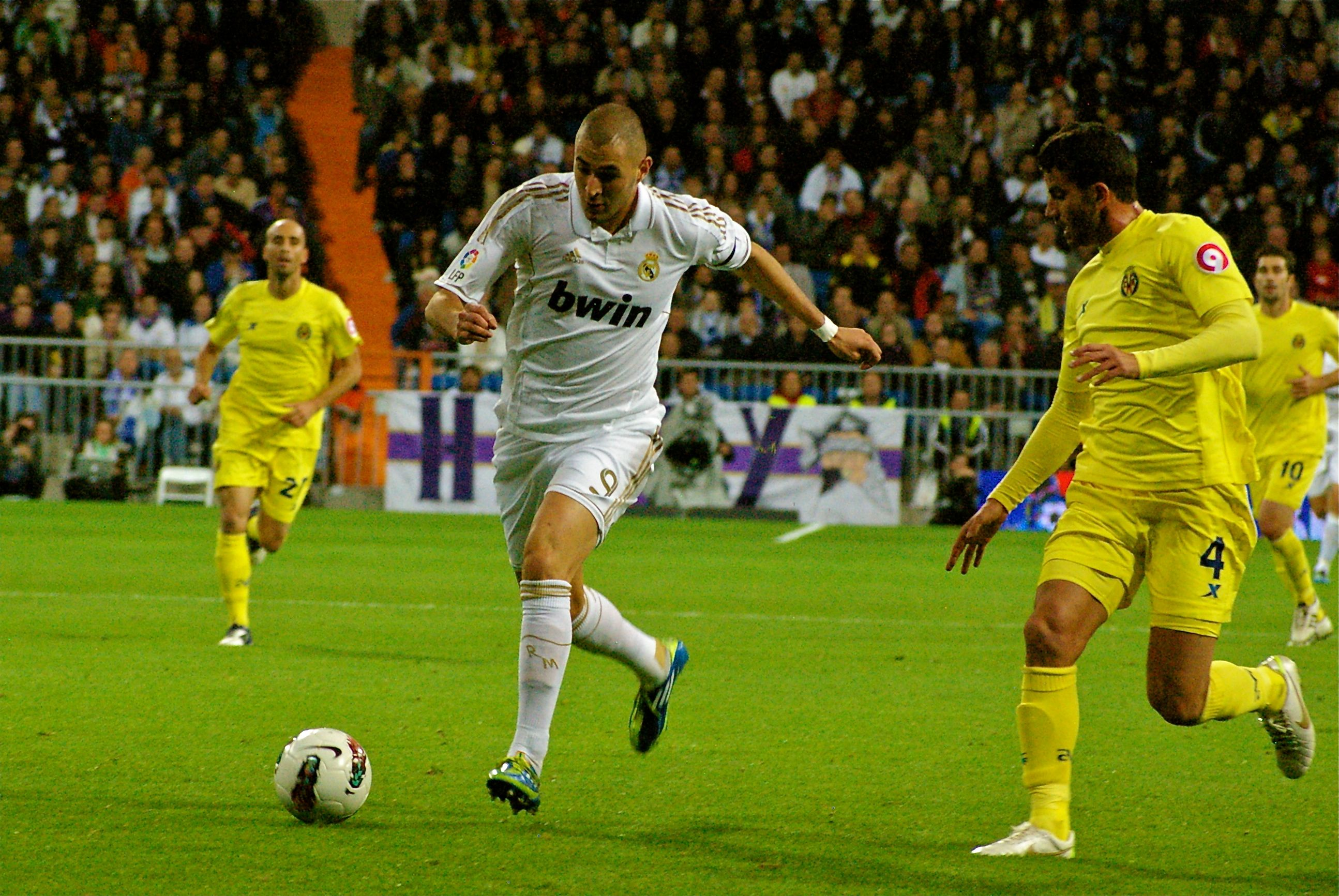
Benzema in a league game against Villarreal

Real Madrid defeated Málaga away on 22 October and moved one point ahead of Barcelona after they were held to a scoreless draw by Sevilla. Higuaín opened the scoring and Ronaldo scored his third hat-trick in La Liga this season for a 0–4 win. This was the first time in club history Real Madrid scored at least four goals in four successive La Liga matches. Four days later Real Madrid blanked Villarreal 3–0 at home with three first half goals. Di María assisted early goals by Benzema and Kaká and then scored one himself on a counterattack. Real Madrid completed the month of October with all victories after defeating Real Sociedad away 0–1 on 29 October with an early goal from Higuaín. The clean sheet also equaled a club record of four consecutive away games in La Liga without conceding a goal. They reclaimed the La Liga lead after Levante lost the following day. IFFHS recognized Real Madrid as The World's Club Team of the Month for October.

=== November ===
Real Madrid clinched a spot in the Champions League knockout phase on 2 November when they defeated Lyon away 0–2. Ronaldo scored both goals to reach 100 competitive goals for Real Madrid in 105 matches. He beat Lloris with a powerful free kick in the first half, which was Real Madrid's 900th goal in European competition, and a penalty kick in the second half. Four days later, Real Madrid defeated Osasuna 7–1 in their first ever noon kickoff, scheduled to cater to Asian audiences. Sixty million people watched the match from China as a result. Prior to kickoff, Ronaldo presented his 2010–11 European Golden Shoe award and the team supported former player Antonio Cassano, who recently suffered a stroke and underwent heart surgery, by wearing "Forza Cassano" shirts. Ronaldo scored his fourth hat-trick in La Liga, Benzema netted two goals, and Pepe and Higuaín scored one each in the victory. Di María served three assists in the first half before tearing his hamstring early in the second half, and Şahin made his Real Madrid debut as a substitute following six months of injury. Real Madrid defeated Valencia away 2–3 on 19 November for their 11th consecutive victory, the longest in Mourinho's managerial career. Nicolás Terol, champion of the 2011 Grand Prix motorcycle racing season 125cc class, ceremonially kicked off the match. Benzema opened the scoring in the first half from a quickly taken Alonso free kick, and Sergio Ramos doubled the lead from a corner in the second half. Roberto Soldado pulled a goal back for Valencia before Ronaldo avoided onrushing goalkeeper Diego Alves to restore a two-goal advantage. Soldado scored again four minutes later, but Valencia had an appeal for a handball in the penalty area turned down in stoppage time. Three days later Real Madrid defeated Dinamo Zagreb 6–2 in their 1,500th official match at the Santiago Bernabéu to clinch top spot in their Champions League group. Despite resting Ronaldo, Iker Casillas and Pepe, Real Madrid scored four goals in the opening 20 minutes through Benzema, Callejón, Özil and Higuaín. Callejón and Benzema scored again after halftime before Fatos Bećiraj and Ivan Tomečak added late consolation goals. The win was also their 250th in UEFA competitions. On 26 November, Real Madrid stretched their unbeaten streak against Atlético Madrid to 22 matches after a 4–1 home victory in the Madrid Derby. Prior to kickoff, Casillas was presented with a commemorative ball by Florentino Pérez for recently becoming the most capped Spanish international of all time. Atlético struck first through Adrián, but shortly afterward goalkeeper Thibaut Courtois was sent off while conceding a penalty, converted by Ronaldo. Di María finished a low cross from Ronaldo early in the second half, and then Higuaín extended the lead by capitalizing on a defensive error from Diego Godín. Godín was later sent off for denying Higuaín a clear goalscoring opportunity in the box and Ronaldo converted another penalty. The victory coupled with Barcelona's loss at Gefate boosted Real Madrid's lead in La Liga to six points. Real Madrid were again recognized by IFFHS as The World's Club Team of the Month after completing November with all victories.

=== December ===
Real Madrid started the month of December with a 0–3 away victory against Sporting de Gijón on 3 December, their 14th consecutive win. Fitness coach Rui Faria was sent off early in the match for protesting a refereeing decision and was subsequently suspended for two matches and fined €600. Di María opened the scoring from a tight angle and then assisted Ronaldo for his 17th La Liga goal before Marcelo completed the scoring in stoppage time. Four days later, they defeated Ajax with a weakened lineup and concluded the Champions League group stage with a maximum 18 points, becoming the fifth team in Champions League history to accomplish the feat. Callejón scored two goals and Higuaín added one for a 3–0 win, although Ajax had two goals questionably disallowed for offside. Castilla loanee Pedro Mendes made his first team debut in the second half. The victory was the team's 15th consecutive win to equal a club record set in 1961. On 10 December, Real Madrid were defeated at home by Barcelona. Benzema scored 21 seconds after kickoff, the fastest goal in El Clásico history, following a Víctor Valdés giveaway, but an Alexis Sánchez strike, a deflected goal by Xavi, and a Cesc Fàbregas header condemned Real Madrid to a 1–3 defeat. Three days later, Real Madrid began their defense of the Copa del Rey with a 0–2 victory at Segunda División B side Ponferradina in the first leg of the round of 32. Callejón and Ronaldo scored the goals and youth team player Jesé officially debuted, but Raúl Albiol was sent off for committing two bookable offences. Real Madrid finished the calendar year as La Liga leaders by three points after a 2–6 away win against Sevilla on 17 December. Ronaldo opened the scoring in the tenth minute from a through ball by Di María. Two minutes later, Casillas made a diving save on a close-range shot from Manu. Di María then assisted Callejón for the second before Ronaldo blasted a long shot into the upper corner, but Pepe earned a second yellow card and was sent off shortly before halftime. Di María scored in the second half and dedicated the goal to his late father-in-law. Jesús Navas pulled a goal back for Sevilla, but soon afterward Manu was shown a straight red card. Ronaldo completed his hat-trick from the penalty spot and substitute Altıntop scored his first goal for Real Madrid before Álvaro Negredo added a consolation goal in stoppage time. Real Madrid defeated Ponferradina 5–1 in the return leg of the Copa del Rey on 20 December to advance 7–1 on aggregate. Callejón scored twice, Şahin scored his first goal for Real Madrid, and Varane and Castilla member Joselu each scored once, while Acorán scored the lone goal for Ponferradina. His goal ended Real Madrid's Copa del Rey clean sheet streak at a club record of 616 minutes that began during the previous season. Youth team members Jorge Casado and Fernando Pacheco made their official debuts in the match.

=== January ===
Real Madrid rallied to defeat Málaga at home 3–2 in the first leg of the round of 16 in the Copa del Rey on 3 January. Defenders Sergio Sánchez and Martín Demichelis converted headers from corners to give Málaga a 2–0 lead, prompting Mourinho to bring on Mesut Özil, Sami Khedira and Karim Benzema at half-time. Madrid then scored three goals through Khedira, Gonzalo Higuaín and Benzema over a ten-minute period for the victory. Rui Faria was again dismissed for protesting a refereeing decision. On 7 January, Real Madrid won their first La Liga game of the year 5–1 against Granada at home. Prior to kickoff, Iker Casillas received an award from medical supplier Sanitas for being the healthiest squad member during the past year as voted by fans. Benzema opened the scoring following an Özil backheel pass, one of his three assists in the match, but Granada equalized three minutes later through Mikel Rico. Sergio Ramos, Higuaín, Benzema and Cristiano Ronaldo added further goals in the victory. Real Madrid extended their La Liga lead to five points after Barcelona drew against Espanyol the following day. On 10 January, Real Madrid defeated Málaga 0–1 in the second leg of the Copa del Rey and progressed to the quarter-finals 4–2 on aggregate. An error by Málaga keeper Willy Caballero allowed Benzema to score the winning goal in the 72nd minute. Álvaro Arbeloa made his 100th appearance for Real Madrid but was sent off late in the match. Real Madrid staged another comeback win on 14 January, defeating Mallorca away 1–2. Tomer Hemed scored with a header in the 39th minute for Mallorca before Higuaín and José Callejón scored second half goals to give Madrid the win. Real Madrid lost to Barcelona at home in the first leg of the Copa del Rey quarter-finals on 18 January. Ronaldo scored early, but second half goals from defenders Carles Puyol and Eric Abidal resulted in a 1–2 defeat. On 22 January, Real Madrid ended the first half of the season as league leaders with a five-point advantage after beating Athletic Bilbao at home 4–1. Fernando Llorente scored early for the visitors but Real Madrid eventually raced to clear 4–1 victory with two penalties from Ronaldo and goals from Marcelo and Callejón. On 25 January, Madrid was eliminated from Copa del Rey by Barcelona after a 2–2 draw at Camp Nou; Barcelona qualified 4–3 on aggregate. The home side was leading after the first half 2–0 with the goals from Pedro and Dani Alves, despite Real Madrid being the dominating side. In the second half, Real Madrid leveled Barcelona with the goals from Ronaldo and Benzema. On 28 January, Real Madrid extended their lead in La Liga to seven points after beating Real Zaragoza home 3–1 while Barcelona could only conjure up a goalless draw away to Villarreal. Zaragoza took the lead in the 11th minute when Ángel Lafita scored for the visitors. Real Madrid, however, once again came from behind to finish with a comfortable win with goals from Kaká, Ronaldo and Özil.

=== February ===
On 4 February, Real Madrid started the month with a 0–1 away win over Getafe. The lone goal, a header, was scored by Sergio Ramos in the first half. On 12 February, Madrid extended their lead in La Liga to ten points after winning 4–2 at home to Levante, while Barcelona had lost the day before to Osasuna in Pamplona. Levante opened the scoring with a header from Gustavo Cabral. The turning point came after a red card to Vicente Iborra, giving away a penalty which was scored by Cristiano Ronaldo. Ronaldo then added two more goals, including a sumptuous third, before Levante pulled another back through Arouna Koné. Karim Benzema then curled home a fourth for Real to finish the scoring. On 18 February, Real Madrid continued their good form in La Liga by beating Racing de Santander at the Bernabéu 4–0. Benzema netted a brace and Ronaldo and Ángel Di María each scored one goal in the comfortable win. Racing played over half of the game with only ten men after Domingo Cisma received a second yellow card for his second handball of the game and was sent off. On 21 February, Real Madrid drew 1–1 with CSKA Moscow in the away leg of their Champions League round of 16 tie. The game, played in snowy conditions in Moscow, was led by Madrid for the majority of the match with a goal from Ronaldo, but a last-minute equalizer by Pontus Wernbloom denied the victory for the visitors. On 26 February, Real Madrid defeated city rival Rayo Vallecano at the Campo de Fútbol de Vallecas by a score of 0–1. The only goal of the game, a back-heel effort by Cristiano Ronaldo, was eventually enough for the visitors to go home with the three points in their pocket.

=== March ===
On 4 March, Real Madrid extended their streak of wins in La Liga to ten games by beating Espanyol at home 5–0. Cristiano Ronaldo, Sami Khedira and Kaká all scored in the impressive win, as did Gonzalo Higuaín, who scored twice. On 10 March, Real Madrid became the first team in the history of La Liga to win ten consecutive away games after beating Real Betis 2–3 at the Estadio Benito Villamarín. The home team started well after Jorge Molina scored early, but Higuaín equalized just over ten minutes later. In the second half, Madrid took the lead with a Ronaldo goal, but Betis equalized only a few minutes later with a strike from Jefferson Montero. Ronaldo, however, scored his second of the night later on which turned out to be the winning goal and guaranteed the full three points for the whites. Real Madrid qualified for the quarter-finals of the Champions League on 14 March by beating CSKA Moscow at home by a score of 4–1, progressing 5–2 on aggregate. Ronaldo netted a brace while Higuaín and Karim Benzema both scored one in the victory, while the lone goal from CSKA was scored by Zoran Tošić. On 18 March, Real Madrid tied against Málaga at the Bernabéu 1–1 after an injury time free kick by Santi Cazorla. Real Madrid's only goal was scored by Benzema. On 21 March, Real Madrid drew again 1–1, this time against Villarreal on the road, with Ronaldo and Marcos Senna scoring the goals. After back-to-back draws, Real Madrid was on an advantage of just six points ahead of rivals Barcelona. In the controversial game, Mourinho was expelled from the match as was fitness trainer Rui Faria for the third time in his season. The referee gave Sergio Ramos a second yellow card for a tough challenge on Nilmar and gave direct red to Özil for sarcastically applauding his decision. Pepe was also booked after the game for insulting the referee, which led to a two-game suspension for him. On 24 March, Real Madrid beat Real Sociedad 5–1, with two goals each from Ronaldo and Benzema and a single goal for Higuaín. Ronaldo averaged 1.01 goals per game by having 100 goals scored in La Liga that day. On the following week, on 27 March, Real Madrid continued their good form in the Champions League quarter-finals first leg by defeating opponent APOEL in Cyprus 0–3. Benzema scored a header from a pass from Kaká, who then scored the second one; Benzema closed the game by scoring the third goal from an Özil assist. On the last day of the month, Real Madrid beat Osasuna away, 1–5. Benzema scored a stupendous volley goal and Ronaldo equally great 36-yard long range shot at goal. It was overall Ronaldo's night, since he also scored another goal, a free kick that was deflected, and assisted two other goals. Higuaín was the third player who got his name on the scoresheet, scoring twice. His last goal was the 100th goal for Madrid in La Liga this season.

=== April ===
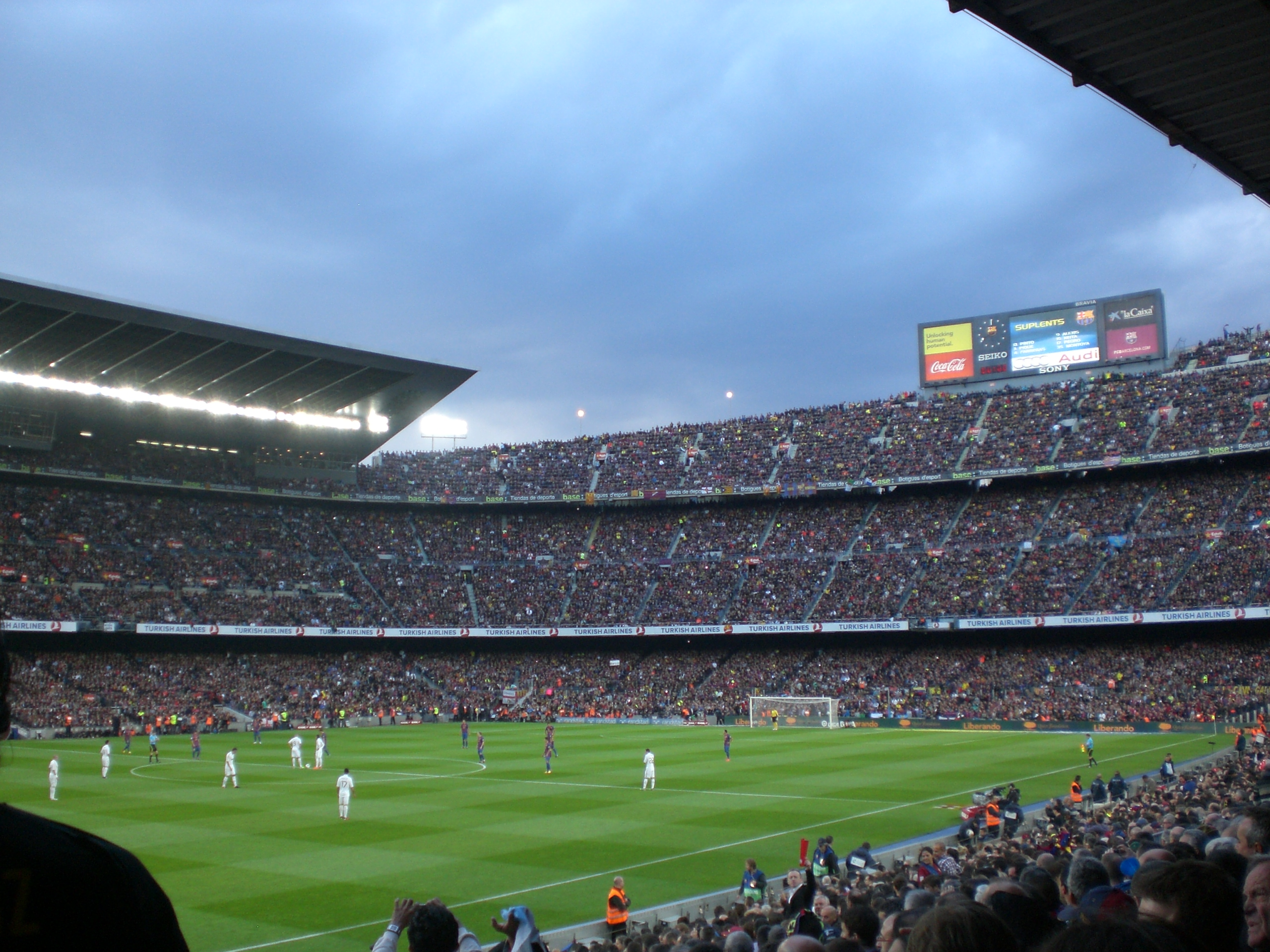
Barcelona and Real Madrid prior to the kick-off of the league's decisive El Clásico

The month started with a 5–2 victory over APOEL in the second leg of the Champions League quarter-finals on 4 April, giving an aggregate score 8–2 as Los Blancos advanced to the semi-finals against final hosts Bayern Munich. Real Madrid was resting some of their usual starters, but still managed to score five goals overall. Cristiano Ronaldo netted a brace and Kaká, José Callejón and Ángel Di María each scored one in the victory, while APOEL's goals were scored by Gustavo Manduca and Esteban Solari, the latter scoring a penalty given to the Cypriots after Hamit Altıntop's foul in the penalty area. On 8 April, Real Madrid had a goalless draw against Valencia in La Liga, leaving them only four points ahead of Barcelona. Three days later, on 11 April, Real Madrid beat Atlético Madrid in an away game 1–4. Cristiano Ronaldo scored a hat-trick, including two astonishing goals, and assisted Callejón to score the fourth goal to close the game. Atlético's only goal was netted by Radamel Falcao. On 14 April, Real Madrid beat Sporting de Gijón home 3–1 with goals from Higuaín, Ronaldo and Benzema. Sporting's only goal was a penalty given to them after a handball from Sergio Ramos in the box, which was scored by Miguel de las Cuevas. On 17 April, Real Madrid lost to Bayern Munich away at the Allianz Arena 2–1 in the first leg of the Champions League semi-finals. Franck Ribéry and Mario Gómez scored for Bayern (the latter in the closing moments of the game), while Mesut Özil netted Madrid's lone goal. On 21 April, Real Madrid defeated Barcelona in El Clásico at Camp Nou 1–2, extending their lead in La Liga to seven points with only four matches left, which all but decided the league title. Sami Khedira opened the scoring from a corner kick in the 17th minute which broke the world record for the most goals scored in a single domestic league season, with 107. Alexis Sánchez equalized in the second half in the 70th minute, but only a few minutes later, Özil assisted and Ronaldo scored the winning goal of the game by shooting the ball over Víctor Valdés into the net. Madrid completely outplayed Barça's "unbeatable" dream team, neutralizing their tiki-taka style, and put out a statement victory which was widely viewed as a sign of changes in the existing football hierarchy, with Los Blancos overtaking Barcelona as a pre-eminent power both in Spain and Europe. On 25 April, in the second leg of the Champions League semi-finals against Bayern Munich, Cristiano Ronaldo initially put Madrid up 2–0, but former Madrid player Arjen Robben netted an away goal back for Bayern with a penalty. The match ended 2–1 after extra time and as both sides were tied 3–3, it went to a shootout. During penalties, Iker Casillas made two saves but Ronaldo, Kaká and Ramos failed to convert their spot kicks and Madrid lost 3–1, bowing out of the Champions League in a heartbreaking fashion. The Champions League setback did not break Madrid's spirit, however, as the team went on to crush Sevilla 3–0 just four days after the UCL semi-finals heartbreak. Ronaldo opened the scoring and Benzema then added a brace.

=== May ===
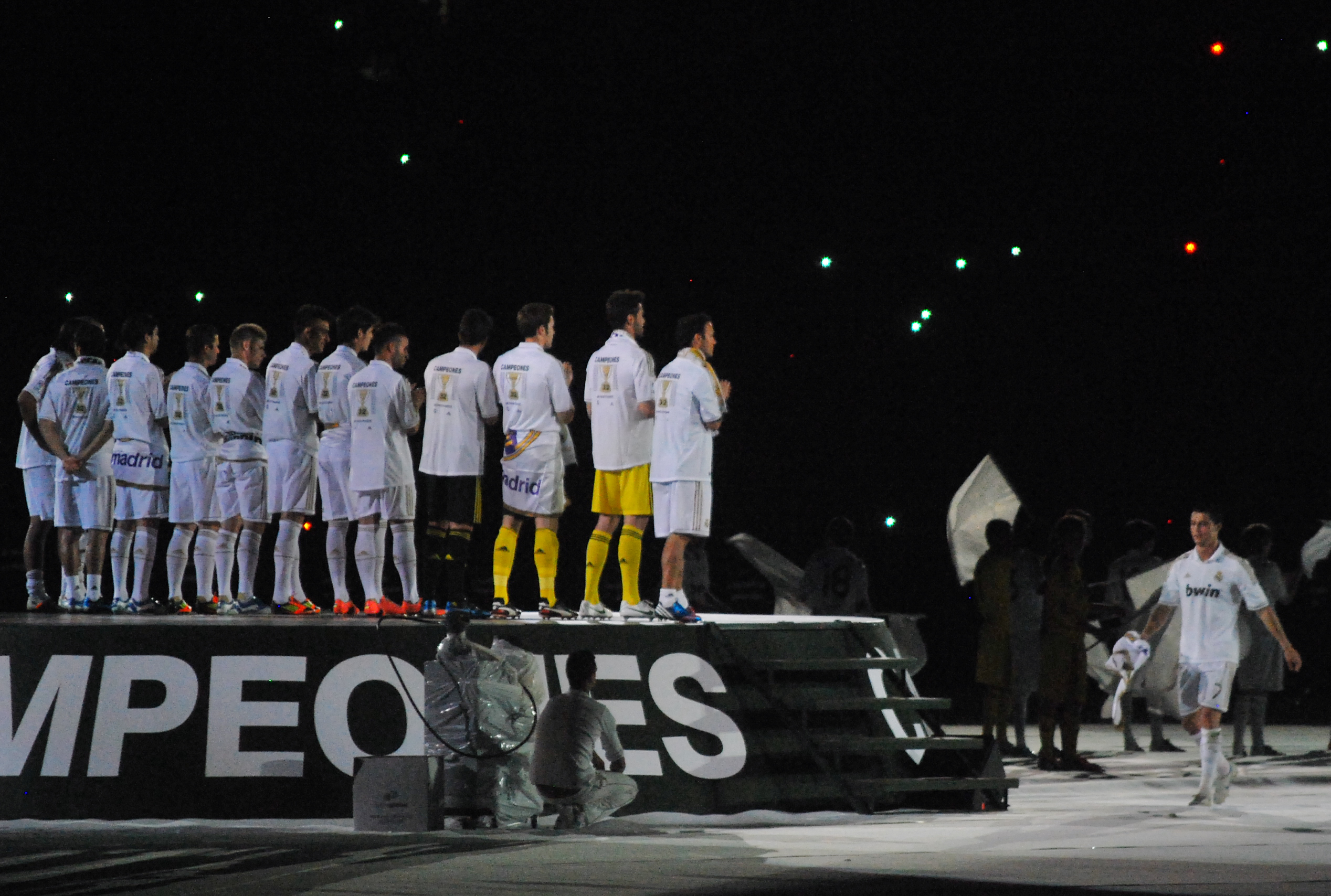
Madrid players celebrate their record-breaking league title after a final day victory over Mallorca

On 2 May 2012, Los Blancos defeated Athletic Bilbao 3–0 in an away game to be crowned champions of Spain after a four-year wait. Higuaín, Özil, and Ronaldo scored as Madrid won La Liga with two games to spare. That wasn't it however, as the team clearly targeted to achieve a record 100 points in a season. Madrid went on to beat Granada away three days later in a dramatic game that saw the home team score early, with Ronaldo equalizing in the 81st minute through a penalty, and Real clinching the victory in injury time, courtesy of an own goal. Two Granada players were sent off after the final whistle after a brawl involving the teams. The final game of the season was against Mallorca at the Bernabéu. Prior to that game, Madridistas had 97 points, meaning that they had to win to become the Centurions. Real did just that by triumphing 4–1 with goals coming from Ronaldo, Benzema, and Özil (2). The team reached the 100-point mark and set numerous records in the process. Overall, La Liga title was a sufficient consolation for a heartbreak in the Champions League semi-finals against Bayern and earlier defeats to Barça in the Supercopa and Copa del Rey.

== Club ==
=== Coaching staff ===
Position	Staff
Head coach	José Mourinho
Assistant coach	Aitor Karanka
Fitness trainer	Rui Faria
Goalkeepers coach	Silvino Louro
Technical assistant	José Morais
Match delegate	Chendo
Doctors	Juan Carlos Hernández, Carlos Díez, Alfonso del Corral
Physiotherapists	Álvaro Solano, Pedro Checa, Daniel Martínez, Juan Muro
Equipment managers	Manuel Fernández, Jorge Casabella, Manuel Ortega, Javier García

Source: Realmadrid.com

=== Other personnel ===
Position	Staff
President	Florentino Pérez
Honorary Life President	Alfredo Di Stéfano
1st Vice-president	Fernando Fernández Tapias
2nd Vice-president	Eduardo Fernández de Blas
Secretary of the Board	Enrique Sánchez González
Director General	José Ángel Sánchez
Director of the President's Office	Manuel Redondo
Director of the Foundation	Julio González
Director of the Social Area	José Luis Sánchez
Director of Protocol	Raúl Serrano
Director of Communications	Antonio Galeano
Director of Institutional Relations	Emilio Butragueño
Director of Control and Internal Auditing	Carlos Martínez
Sporting Manager of Football	José Mourinho
Director of First Team	Zinedine Zidane
Director of Human Resources	José María García
Director of the Legal Advisory Board	Javier López Farré
Director of Football	Miguel Pardeza
Director of Economics	Julio Esquerdeiro
Director of Resources	Enrique Balboa
Director of Commercial Management	Begoña Sanz
Director of Operations and Services	Fernando Tormo

Source: Board of Directors, Organization

=== Grounds ===
Ground (capacity and dimensions)	Santiago Bernabéu (85,454 81,254 stadium & 4200 suites / 105x68m)
Training ground	Ciudad Real Madrid

=== Kits ===
Supplier: Adidas
Sponsor(s): bwin

Home	Home alt.	Away	Away alt.	Third

Source: Home kit, RealMadrid.com

=== Official sponsors ===
bwin • Adidas • Mahou • Audi • Emirates • Coca-Cola • STC • Movistar • Sanitas • Solán de Cabras • Solaria • Dua Kelinci

Source: English, Spanish, Japanese

== Players ==
=== Squad information ===
N	Pos.	Nat.	Name	Age	EU	Since	App	Goals	Ends	Transfer fee	Notes
1	GK	(Spain)	Iker Casillas (captain)	31	EU	1999	625	0	2017	Youth system	
2	CB	(Portugal)	Ricardo Carvalho	34	EU	2010	61	3	2013	€8M	
3	CB	(Portugal)	Pepe	29	EU	2007	157	3	2016	€30M	Second nationality: Brazil
4	RB	(Spain)	Sergio Ramos (vice-captain)	26	EU	2005	312	36	2017	€28M	
5	CM	(Turkey)	Nuri Şahin	23	EU	2011	10	1	2017	€10M	Second nationality: Germany
6	DM	(Germany)	Sami Khedira	25	EU	2010	82	4	2015	€12M	Second nationality: Tunisia
7	LW	(Portugal)	Cristiano Ronaldo	27	EU	2009	144	146	2015	€94M	
8	AM	(Brazil)	Kaká	30	EU	2009	93	24	2015	€65M	Second nationality: Italy
9	ST	(France)	Karim Benzema	24	EU	2009	133	67	2015	€35M	Second nationality: Algeria
10	AM	(Germany)	Mesut Özil	23	EU	2010	105	17	2016	€15M	
11	CM	(Spain)	Esteban Granero	24	EU	2009	96	5	2013	€4.5M	Originally from youth system
12	LB	(Brazil)	Marcelo (vice-captain)	24	EU	2007 (Winter)	209	16	2015	€6.5M	Second nationality: Spain
13	GK	(Spain)	Antonio Adán	25	EU	2009	10	0	2014	Youth system	
14	CM	(Spain)	Xabi Alonso	30	EU	2009	145	6	2014	€30M	
15	LWB	(Portugal)	Fábio Coentrão	24	EU	2011	33	0	2017	€30M	
16	MF	(Turkey)	Hamit Altıntop	29	EU	2011	12	1	2015	Free	Second nationality: Germany
17	RB	(Spain)	Álvaro Arbeloa	29	EU	2009	123	3	2014	€4.5M	Originally from youth system
18	CB	(Spain)	Raúl Albiol	26	EU	2009	92	1	2014	€15M	
19	CB	(France)	Raphaël Varane	19	EU	2011	15	2	2017	€10M	
20	ST	(Argentina)	Gonzalo Higuaín (vice-captain)	24	EU	2007 (Winter)	220	103	2016	€13M	Second nationality: France
21	LW	(Spain)	José Callejón	25	EU	2011	36	13	2016	€5M	Originally from youth system
22	RW	(Argentina)	Ángel Di María	24	Non-EU	2010	85	16	2016	€25M	
23	RB	(Portugal)	Pedro Mendes	21	EU	2011	1	0	2012	Youth system	Member of youth system
24	DM	(France)	Lassana Diarra	27	EU	2009 (Winter)	115	1	2013	€20M	Second nationality: Mali
26	ST	(Spain)	Álvaro Morata	19	EU	2010	3	0		Youth system	Member of youth system
27	LB	(Spain)	Nacho	22	EU	2010	3	0	2012	Youth system	Member of youth system
28	LW	(Spain)	Jesé	19	EU	2011	2	0		Youth system	Member of youth system
29	ST	(Spain)	Joselu	22	EU	2011	2	2		Youth system	Member of youth system
31	GK	(Spain)	Fernando Pacheco	20	EU	2011	1	0		Youth system	Member of youth system
33	LW	(Spain)	Pablo Sarabia	20	EU	2010	1	0	2013	Youth system	
38	LB	(Spain)	Jorge Casado	23	EU	2011	1	0		Youth system	Member of youth system
40	GK	(Spain)	Tomás Mejías	23	EU	2011	1	0		Youth system	

- Last updated: 13 May 2012
- Source: realmadrid.com, Wikipedia players' articles (for players' numbers, appearances, and goals)
- Ordered by squad number.

=== In ===
No.	Pos.	Nat.	Name	Age	EU	Moving from	Type	Transfer window	Ends	Transfer fee	Source
5	CM	(Turkey)	Nuri Şahin	22	EU	Borussia Dortmund (Germany)	Transfer	Summer	2017	€10M	RealMadrid.com
16	RM	(Turkey)	Hamit Altıntop	28	EU	Bayern Munich (Germany)	Transfer	Summer	2015	Free	RealMadrid.com
21	LW	(Spain)	José Callejón	24	EU	Espanyol	Transfer	Summer	2016	€5M	RealMadrid.com
19	CB	(France)	Raphaël Varane	18	EU	Lens (France)	Transfer	Summer	2017	€10M	RealMadrid.com
	LM	(Netherlands)	Royston Drenthe	24	EU	Hércules	Loan return	Summer	2012	N/A	RealMadrid.com
	CB	(Spain)	David Mateos	24	EU	AEK Athens (Greece)	Loan return	Summer	2013	N/A	RealMadrid.com
15	LWB	(Portugal)	Fábio Coentrão	23	EU	Benfica (Portugal)	Transfer	Summer	2017	€30M	RealMadrid.com

Total expenditure: ▼€55 million

=== Out ===
No.	Pos.	Nat.	Name	Age	EU	Moving to	Type	Transfer window	Transfer fee	Source
25	GK	(Poland)	Jerzy Dudek	38	EU		Retirement	Summer	Free	RealMadrid.com
6	ST	(Togo)	Emmanuel Adebayor	27	EU	Manchester City (England)	Loan return	Summer	N/A	MCFC.co.uk
	CB	(Spain)	David Mateos	24	EU	Zaragoza	Loan	Summer	N/A	RealZaragoza.com
19	CB	(Argentina)	Ezequiel Garay	24	Non-EU	Benfica (Portugal)	Transfer	Summer	€5.5M	SLBenfica.pt, RealMadrid.com
16	AM	(Spain)	Sergio Canales	20	EU	Valencia	Loan	Summer	€1M	RealMadrid.com
21	RW	(Spain)	Pedro León	24	EU	Getafe	Loan	Summer	N/A	GetafeCF.com, RealMadrid.com
5	CM	(Argentina)	Fernando Gago	25	EU	Roma (Italy)	Loan	Summer	€0.5M	ASRoma.it, RealMadrid.com
	LM	(Netherlands)	Royston Drenthe	24	EU	Everton (England)	Loan	Summer	N/A	EvertonFC.com, RealMadrid.com

Total income: ▲€9 million

== Pre-season and friendlies ==
16 July 2011 2011 WFC	Los Angeles Galaxy	1–4	Real Madrid	Los Angeles, California, United States
19:00 PDT (UTC-07)	López (yellow card) 38'; Cristman 67'	Report	Callejón 31'; Joselu 40'; Ronaldo 53'; Benzema 58'	Stadium: Los Angeles Memorial Coliseum; Attendance: 56,211; Referee: Jorge González (United States); Man of the Match: Coentrão

20 July 2011 2011 WFC	Guadalajara	0–3	Real Madrid	San Diego, California, United States
20:00 PDT (UTC-07)	Mejía (yellow card) 36'; Arellano (yellow card) 44'	Report	Coentrão (yellow card) 41'; Ronaldo (yellow card) 56', (goal) 73', 76' (pen.), 82'	Stadium: Qualcomm Stadium; Attendance: 38,211; Referee: Ricardo Salazar (United States); Man of the Match: Ronaldo

23 July 2011 2011 WFC	Philadelphia Union	1–2	Real Madrid	Philadelphia, Pennsylvania, United States
21:00 EDT (UTC-04)	M. Farfan 80'; González (yellow card) 90+2'	Report	Callejón 2'; Özil 11'	Stadium: Lincoln Financial Field; Attendance: 57,305; Referee: Arkadiusz Prus (United States); Man of the Match: Callejón

27 July 2011 Europe Tour	Hertha BSC	1–3	Real Madrid	Berlin, Germany
18:00 CEST (UTC+02)	Ebert 18', (yellow card) 30'	Report	Ronaldo 29'; Benzema 32', 47'	Stadium: Olympiastadion; Attendance: 74,244; Referee: Manuel Gräfe (Germany); Man of the Match: Benzema, Ronaldo
Note: Real Madrid did not wear a shirt sponsor due to German gambling laws.

30 July 2011 Npower Challenge Cup	Leicester City	1–2	Real Madrid	Leicester, England
17:15 BST (UTC+01)	Dyer 89'	Report	Callejón 43'; Benzema 62'	Stadium: King Power Stadium; Attendance: 32,188; Referee: Andre Marriner (England); Man of the Match: Benzema, Coentrão
Note: Real Madrid started the match wearing their home kit then changed into their away kit at halftime.

3 August 2011 China Tour	Guangzhou Evergrande	1–7	Real Madrid	Guangzhou, China
19:45 CST (UTC+08)	Yang Y. 87'	Report	Khedira 7'; Özil 31'; Benzema 39', 48'; Ronaldo 56'; Jesé 71'; Di María 83'	Stadium: Tianhe Stadium; Attendance: 45,000; Referee: Liu Kwok Man (Hong Kong); Man of the Match: Benzema, Ronaldo

6 August 2011 China Tour	Tianjin Teda	0–6	Real Madrid	Tianjin, China
17:45 CST (UTC+08)	Olguín (yellow card) 30'	Report	Kaká 9' (pen.); Di María 14'; Coentrão (yellow card) 32'; Higuaín 68'; Ronaldo 74'; Benzema 79', 82'	Stadium: Tianjin Olympic Center Stadium; Attendance: 25,000; Referee: Tan Hai (China); Man of the Match: Coentrão, Di María

24 August 2011 Trofeo Bernabéu	Real Madrid	2–1	Galatasaray	Madrid, Spain
22:30 CEST (UTC+02)	Ramos 34'; Benzema 50'	Report	İnan 10'; Ujfaluši (yellow card) 44'; Kazim-Richards (yellow card) 44'	Stadium: Santiago Bernabéu Stadium; Attendance: 67,000; Referee: Ignacio Iglesias Villanueva (Galicia); Man of the Match: Alonso, Benzema

16 May 2012 Friendly	Kuwait	0–2	Real Madrid	Kaifan, Kuwait
20:15 AST (UTC+03)		Report	Di María 27'; Ronaldo 31'	Stadium: Al Kuwait Sports Club Stadium; Attendance: 18,500; Referee: Muhanad Al-Thuwani (Kuwait)
Note: Real Madrid did not wear a shirt sponsor.

Last updated: 16 May 2012
Source: World Football Challenge, US, Europe & China Tour, Hertha Berlin, Leicester City, China Tour, Trofeo Santiago Bernabéu, Kuwait

=== Overview ===
Competition	First match	Last match	Starting round	Final position	Record							
Competition	First match	Last match	Starting round	Final position	Pld	W	D	L	GF	GA	GD	Win %
La Liga	28 August 2011	13 May 2012	Matchday 1	Winners	38	32	4	2	121	32	+89	84.21
Copa del Rey	13 December 2011	25 January 2012	Round of 32	Quarter-finals	6	4	1	1	14	7	+7	66.67
Supercopa de España	14 August 2011	14 August 2011	Semi-finals	Runners-up	2	0	1	1	4	5	−1	0.00
UEFA Champions League	14 September 2011	25 April 2012	League phase	Semi-finals	12	10	1	1	35	9	+26	83.33
Total					58	46	7	5	174	53	+121	79.31

Source: Competitions

== Competitions ==
=== Supercopa de España ===
14 August 2011 First leg	Real Madrid	2–2	Barcelona	Madrid
22:00 CEST (UTC+02)	Özil 13'; Khedira (yellow card) 32'; Alonso 54', (yellow card) 78'; Coentrão (yellow card) 90+1'	Report	Villa 36'; Messi 45+1'; Sánchez (yellow card) 55'; Alves (yellow card) 90+3'	Stadium: Estadio Santiago Bernabéu; Attendance: 80,000; Referee: Fernando Teixeira Vitienes (Cantabria); Man of the Match: Alonso, Coentrão

17 August 2011 Second leg	Barcelona	3–2 (5–4 agg.)	Real Madrid	Barcelona
23:00 CEST (UTC+02)	Iniesta 15'; Xavi (yellow card) 42'; Messi 45', 88'; Valdés (yellow card) 90+3'; Villa (red card) 90+5'	Report	Ronaldo 20', (yellow card) 54'; Khedira (yellow card) 28'; Marcelo (yellow card) 54' (red card) 90+4'; Pepe (yellow card) 62'; Ramos (yellow card) 76'; Benzema 82'; Coentrão (yellow card) 85'; Özil (red card) 90+5'	Stadium: Camp Nou; Attendance: 92,000; Referee: David Fernández Borbalán (Andalusia)
Note: David Villa and Mesut Özil were both sent off for fighting after being substituted.

Last updated: 17 August 2011
Source: RealMadrid.com

=== La Liga ===
==== League table ====
Pos	Team	Pld	W	D	L	GF	GA	GD	Pts	Qualification or relegation
1	Real Madrid (C)	38	32	4	2	121	32	+89	100	Qualification for the Champions League group stage
2	Barcelona	38	28	7	3	114	29	+85	91	Qualification for the Champions League group stage
3	Valencia	38	17	10	11	59	44	+15	61	Qualification for the Champions League group stage
4	Málaga	38	17	7	14	54	53	+1	58	Qualification for the Champions League play-off round
5	Atlético Madrid	38	15	11	12	53	46	+7	56	Qualification for the Europa League group stage (Note: Atlético Madrid won the 2011–12 UEFA Europa League and thus secured the title holder spot in the group stage of the 2012–13 UEFA Europa League.)

Source: ESPN
Rules for classification: 1st points; 2nd head-to-head points; 3rd head-to-head goal difference; 4th head-to-head goals scored; 5th goal difference; 6th number of goals scored; 7th Fair-play points
(C) Champions

==== Results by round ====
Round	1	2	3	4	5	6	7	8	9	10	11	12	13	14	15	16	17	18	19	20	21	22	23	24	25	26	27	28	29	30	31	32	33	34	35	36	37	38
Ground	A	H	A	A	H	A	H	A	H	A	H	A	H	A	H	A	H	A	H	H	A	H	H	A	H	A	H	A	H	A	H	A	H	A	H	A	A	H
Result	W	W	L	D	W	W	W	W	W	W	W	W	W	W	L	W	W	W	W	W	W	W	W	W	W	W	D	D	W	W	D	W	W	W	W	W	W	W
Position	1	1	5	7	5	3	3	2	2	1	1	1	1	1	1	1	1	1	1	1	1	1	1	1	1	1	1	1	1	1	1	1	1	1	1	1	1	1

Updated to match(es) played on 13 May 2012. Source: Competitive matches
A = Away; H = Home; W = Win; D = Draw; L = Loss

==== Matches ====
Win Draw Loss Postponed

21 August 2011 1	Real Madrid	v	Athletic Bilbao	Madrid
18:00 CEST (UTC+02:00)				Stadium: Estadio Santiago Bernabéu; Referee: Antonio Mateu Lahoz (Valencian Community)
Note: Postponed to 22 January due to AFE strike after failing to reach a collective bargaining agreement with the LFP.

28 August 2011 2	Zaragoza	0–6	Real Madrid	Zaragoza
20:00 CEST (UTC+02:00)	Meira (yellow card) 21'; Abraham (yellow card) 26'	Report	Ronaldo 24', 71', 87'; Marcelo 28'; Alonso 64'; Carvalho (yellow card) 69'; Kaká 82'	Stadium: La Romareda; Attendance: 28,000; Referee: César Muñiz Fernández (Asturias); Man of the Match: Ronaldo, Özil

10 September 2011 3	Real Madrid	4–2	Getafe	Madrid
20:00 CEST (UTC+02:00)	Benzema 14', 69'; Ronaldo (yellow card) 21', (goal) 60' (pen.); Carvalho (yellow card) 68'; Alonso (yellow card) 82'; Higuaín 88'	Report	Valera (yellow card) 21'; Miku 39', 73'; Casquero (yellow card) 45'; Torres (yellow card) 84'	Stadium: Estadio Santiago Bernabéu; Attendance: 76,000; Referee: Carlos Clos Gómez (Aragon); Man of the Match: Benzema, Ronaldo
Note: Getafe head coach Luis García was dismissed in the 85th minute.

18 September 2011 4	Levante	1–0	Real Madrid	Valencia
20:00 CEST (UTC+02:00)	Valdo (yellow card) 38'; Iborra (yellow card) 39'; Ballesteros (yellow card) 40'; Venta (yellow card) 43'; Koné 68'; Torres (yellow card) 78'; Rubén (yellow card) 81'; Pallardó (yellow card) 87'	Report	Khedira (yellow card) 25' (yellow-red card) 40'; Di María (yellow card) 39'; Pepe (yellow card) 78'; Coentrão (yellow card) 90+4'	Stadium: Estadi Ciutat de València; Attendance: 17,000; Referee: Javier Turienzo Álvarez (Castile and León)

21 September 2011 5	Racing Santander	0–0	Real Madrid	Santander
20:00 CEST (UTC+02:00)	Stuani (yellow card) 38'; Ariel (yellow card) 69'; Tziolis (yellow card) 70'; Christian (yellow card) 81'; Munitis (yellow card) 86'; Adrián (yellow card) 90+5'	Report	Özil (yellow card) 22'; Diarra (yellow card) 72'; Carvalho (yellow card) 90+3'	Stadium: Campos de Sport de El Sardinero; Attendance: 21,000; Referee: David Fernández Borbalán (Andalusia)

24 September 2011 6	Real Madrid	6–2	Rayo Vallecano	Madrid
20:00 CEST (UTC+02:00)	Di María (yellow card) 17' (yellow-red card) 56'; Ronaldo 39', 51' (pen.), 84' (pen.); Higuaín 45+1'; Alonso (yellow card) 58'; Varane 67'; Benzema 73'	Report	Michu 1', 55'; Arribas (yellow card) 45'; Movilla (yellow card) 50'; Bangoura (yellow card) 65'; Giménez (yellow card) 83'	Stadium: Estadio Santiago Bernabéu; Attendance: 72,000; Referee: José Luis Paradas Romero (Andalusia); Man of the Match: Ronaldo, Özil

2 October 2011 7	Espanyol	0–4	Real Madrid	Cornellà de Llobregat
22:00 CEST (UTC+02:00)	Bifouma (yellow card) 24'; López (yellow card) 29'; Romaric (yellow card) 31'; Weiss (yellow card) 80'	Report	Higuaín 17', 66', 89'; Diarra (yellow card) 50'; Callejón 82'	Stadium: Estadi Cornellà-El Prat; Attendance: 34,423; Referee: Fernando Teixeira Vitienes (Cantabria); Man of the Match: Higuaín, Ronaldo

15 October 2011 8	Real Madrid	4–1	Real Betis	Madrid
18:00 CEST (UTC+02:00)	Pepe (yellow card) 24'; Higuaín 46', 70', 73'; Kaká 59'	Report	Sevilla (yellow card) 60'; Beñat (yellow card) 65'; Molina 69'; Momo (yellow card) 86'	Stadium: Estadio Santiago Bernabéu; Attendance: 83,000; Referee: Carlos Delgado Ferreiro (Basque Country); Man of the Match: Higuaín, Kaká

22 October 2011 9	Málaga	0–4	Real Madrid	Málaga
20:00 CEST (UTC+02:00)	Eliseu (yellow card) 25'	Report	Higuaín 11'; Ronaldo 23', 28', 38'	Stadium: Estadio La Rosaleda; Attendance: 28,500; Referee: Antonio Mateu Lahoz (Valencian Community); Man of the Match: Ronaldo, Di María

26 October 2011 10	Real Madrid	3–0	Villarreal	Madrid
22:00 CEST (UTC+02:00)	Benzema 5'; Kaká 11', (yellow card) 53'; Alonso (yellow card) 21'; Di María 30'	Report	Gonzalo (yellow card) 16'; Catalá (yellow card) 46'; Ruben (yellow card) 54'	Stadium: Estadio Santiago Bernabéu; Attendance: 55,000; Referee: Miguel Ángel Pérez Lasa (Basque Country); Man of the Match: Benzema, Ramos

29 October 2011 11	Real Sociedad	0–1	Real Madrid	San Sebastián
22:00 CEST (UTC+02:00)	Cadamuro (yellow card) 47'; Griezmann (yellow card) 69'; C. Martínez (yellow card) 84'; Bergara (yellow card) 86'; I. Martínez (yellow card) 90+1'	Report	Higuaín 9'; Arbeloa (yellow card) 11'; Ramos (yellow card) 82'	Stadium: Estadio Anoeta; Attendance: 27,193; Referee: Alberto Undiano Mallenco (Navarre); Man of the Match: Higuaín, Pepe

6 November 2011 12	Real Madrid	7–1	Osasuna	Madrid
12:00 CET (UTC+01:00)	Ronaldo 23', 54' (pen.), 58'; Pepe 34'; Higuaín 40'; Benzema 63', 81'	Report	Puñal (yellow card) 22'; Ibrahima 31'; Satrústegui (yellow card) 32' (yellow-red card) 54'	Stadium: Estadio Santiago Bernabéu; Attendance: 83,000; Referee: Alfonso Javier Álvarez Izquierdo (Catalonia); Man of the Match: Ronaldo, Di María

19 November 2011 13	Valencia	2–3	Real Madrid	Valencia
22:00 CET (UTC+01:00)	T. Costa (yellow card) 22'; Albelda (yellow card) 59'; Soldado 75', 83'; Alves (yellow card) 90+6'	Report	Benzema 20'; Arbeloa (yellow card) 33'; Ronaldo (yellow card) 53', (goal) 79'; Marcelo (yellow card) 55'; Özil (yellow card) 56'; Ramos (yellow card) 59', (goal) 72'; Alonso (yellow card) 65'; Granero (yellow card) 90+4'	Stadium: Estadio Mestalla; Attendance: 45,000; Referee: José Antonio Teixeira Vitienes (Cantabria); Man of the Match: Ramos, Benzema

26 November 2011 14	Real Madrid	4–1	Atlético Madrid	Madrid
20:00 CET (UTC+01:00)	Ronaldo 24' (pen.), 82' (pen.); Alonso (yellow card) 40'; Di María 49'; Higuaín 65'	Report	Adrián 15'; Diego (yellow card) 18'; Courtois (red card) 22'; Turan (yellow card) 27'; Perea (yellow card) 33'; Gabi (yellow card) 36'; Filipe Luís (yellow card) 67'; Godín (red card) 81'	Stadium: Estadio Santiago Bernabéu; Attendance: 80,315; Referee: Antonio Mateu Lahoz (Valencian Community); Man of the Match: Di María, Benzema

3 December 2011 15	Sporting Gijón	0–3	Real Madrid	Gijón
18:00 CET (UTC+01:00)	Eguren (yellow card) 22' (yellow-red card) 80'; Barral (yellow card) 24'; Trejo (yellow card) 27'; Bilić (yellow card) 27'; Cases (yellow card) 45+2'	Report	Callejón (yellow card) 22'; Di María 34', (yellow card) 56'; Coentrão (yellow card) 48'; Ronaldo 64'; Marcelo 90+2'	Stadium: El Molinón; Attendance: 27,000; Referee: Eduardo Iturralde González (Basque Country); Man of the Match: Marcelo, Di María
Note: Real Madrid assistant coach Rui Faria was dismissed in the 18th minute. Callejón and Bilić were booked while substitutes.

10 December 2011 16	Real Madrid	1–3	Barcelona	Madrid
22:00 CET (UTC+01:00)	Benzema 1'; Alonso (yellow card) 26'; Diarra (yellow card) 61'; Pepe (yellow card) 62'; Ramos (yellow card) 70'	Report	Sánchez (yellow card) 27', (goal) 30'; Messi (yellow card) 36'; Piqué (yellow card) 48'; Xavi 53'; Fàbregas 66'	Stadium: Estadio Santiago Bernabéu; Attendance: 83,500; Referee: David Fernández Borbalán (Andalusia); Man of the Match: Benzema

17 December 2011 17	Sevilla	2–6	Real Madrid	Seville
22:00 CET (UTC+01:00)	Rakitić (yellow card) 21'; Medel (yellow card) 52'; Kanouté (yellow card) 64'; Navas 69'; Manu (red card) 74'; Negredo 90+2'	Report	Ronaldo 10', 41', 85' (pen.); Pepe (yellow card) 30' (yellow-red card) 44'; Ramos (yellow card) 33'; Callejón 37'; Arbeloa (yellow card) 44'; Diarra (yellow card) 53'; Di María 66'; Altıntop 89'	Stadium: Estadio Ramón Sánchez Pizjuán; Attendance: 40,000; Referee: Carlos Clos Gómez (Aragon); Man of the Match: Ronaldo, Di María, Casillas

7 January 2012 18	Real Madrid	5–1	Granada	Madrid
20:00 CET (UTC+01:00)	Benzema 19', 50'; Ramos 34'; Higuaín 47', (yellow card) 60'; Ronaldo 89'	Report	M. Rico 22'; Roberto (yellow card) 24'	Stadium: Estadio Santiago Bernabéu; Attendance: 78,000; Referee: César Muñiz Fernández (Asturias); Man of the Match: Benzema, Özil

14 January 2012 19	Mallorca	1–2	Real Madrid	Palma
20:00 CET (UTC+01:00)	Hemed 39'; Tissone (yellow card) 56'; Cendrós (yellow card) 57'; Castro (yellow card) 83'; Ogunjimi (yellow card) 88'	Report	Higuaín 72'; Callejón 84'; Coentrão (yellow card) 86'	Stadium: Iberostar Estadio; Attendance: 19,557; Referee: Pedro Jesús Pérez Montero (Andalusia); Man of the Match: Callejón, Ramos

22 January 2012 1	Real Madrid	4–1	Athletic Bilbao	Madrid
21:30 CET (UTC+01:00)	Marcelo 25'; Ronaldo (yellow card) 28', (goal) 47' (pen.), 67' (pen.); Ramos (yellow card) 57'; Arbeloa (yellow card) 74'; Callejón 85'	Report	Llorente 13'; De Marcos (yellow card) 26' (red card) 66'; Iturraspe (yellow card) 46'	Stadium: Estadio Santiago Bernabéu; Attendance: 75,000; Referee: Antonio Mateu Lahoz (Valencian Community); Man of the Match: Özil, Marcelo
Note: Originally scheduled for 21 August but was postponed due to AFE strike after failing to reach a collective bargaining agreement with the LFP.

28 January 2012 21	Real Madrid	3–1	Zaragoza	Madrid
20:00 CET (UTC+01:00)	Kaká 32'; Ronaldo 49', (yellow card) 63'; Özil 56'	Report	Lafita 11'; Paredes (yellow card) 26'	Stadium: Estadio Santiago Bernabéu; Attendance: 67,000; Referee: Eduardo Iturralde González (Basque Country); Man of the Match: Özil, Granero

4 February 2012 22	Getafe	0–1	Real Madrid	Getafe
20:00 CET (UTC+01:00)	Rodríguez (yellow card) 28'; Díaz (yellow card) 33'; Casquero (yellow card) 35'; Miku (yellow card) 36'; Arizmendi (yellow card) 82'; Masilela (yellow card) 87'	Report	Ramos 18'	Stadium: Coliseum Alfonso Pérez; Attendance: 13,000; Referee: Miguel Ángel Ayza Gámez (Valencian Community); Man of the Match: Ramos, Özil

12 February 2012 23	Real Madrid	4–2	Levante	Madrid
21:30 CET (UTC+01:00)	Ramos (yellow card) 36'; Ronaldo 45' (pen.), 50', 57'; Pepe (yellow card) 49'; Benzema 66'; Arbeloa (yellow card) 84'	Report	Cabral 5', (yellow card) 86'; Serrano (yellow card) 33'; Iborra (yellow card) 37' (yellow-red card) 43'; Koné 63'	Stadium: Estadio Santiago Bernabéu; Attendance: 67,000; Referee: Alberto Undiano Mallenco (Navarre); Man of the Match: Ronaldo, Benzema

18 February 2012 24	Real Madrid	4–0	Racing Santander	Madrid
20:00 CET (UTC+01:00)	Ronaldo 6'; Benzema 45+1', 89'; Ramos (yellow card) 58'; Kaká (yellow card) 69'; Di María 73'; Carvalho (yellow card) 87'	Report	Cisma (yellow card) 26' (yellow-red card) 39'; Álvaro (yellow card) 45+1'	Stadium: Estadio Santiago Bernabéu; Attendance: 76,000; Referee: José Luis González González (Castile and León); Man of the Match: Di María, Benzema

26 February 2012 25	Rayo Vallecano	0–1	Real Madrid	Madrid
16:00 CET (UTC+01:00)	Costa (yellow card) 20'; Fuego (yellow card) 84'; Michu (red card) 89'; Arribas (yellow card) 90+2'	Report	Ramos (yellow card) 3'; Casillas (yellow card) 41'; Marcelo (yellow card) 45'; Ronaldo 54'; Alonso (yellow card) 65'; Coentrão (yellow card) 90'; Pepe (yellow card) 90+3'	Stadium: Campo de Fútbol de Vallecas; Attendance: 12,400; Referee: David Fernández Borbalán (Andalusia); Man of the Match: Ronaldo, Casillas
Note: Assistant coach Rui Faria was dismissed in the 66th minute.

4 March 2012 26	Real Madrid	5–0	Espanyol	Madrid
21:30 CET (UTC+01:00)	Ronaldo 23'; Carvalho (yellow card) 30'; Khedira 38'; Higuaín 47', 78'; Kaká 66'	Report	Verdú (yellow card) 54'; Forlín (yellow card) 56'	Stadium: Estadio Santiago Bernabéu; Attendance: 77,000; Referee: José Antonio Teixeira Vitienes (Cantabria); Man of the Match: Higuaín, Özil

10 March 2012 27	Real Betis	2–3	Real Madrid	Seville
22:00 CET (UTC+01:00)	Molina 10'; Iriney (yellow card) 35'; Montero 55'	Report	Higuaín 25'; Kaká (yellow card) 37'; Ramos (yellow card) 37'; Ronaldo 52', 73'; Arbeloa (yellow card) 90+2'	Stadium: Estadio Benito Villamarín; Attendance: 51,566; Referee: Eduardo Iturralde González (Basque Country), Gorka Sagués Oscoz (Basque Country); Man of the Match: Ronaldo, Higuaín
Note: Referee Eduardo Iturralde González was injured and replaced by fourth official Gorka Sagués Oscoz at halftime.

18 March 2012 28	Real Madrid	1–1	Málaga	Madrid
21:30 CET (UTC+01:00)	Benzema 35'; Khedira (yellow card) 63'; Pepe (yellow card) 87'	Report	Sánchez (yellow card) 53'; Cazorla 90+2'	Stadium: Estadio Santiago Bernabéu; Attendance: 75,000; Referee: Miguel Ángel Ayza Gámez (Valencian Community); Man of the Match: Benzema

21 March 2012 29	Villarreal	1–1	Real Madrid	Villarreal
22:00 CET (UTC+01:00)	Senna (yellow card) 20', (goal) 83'; Mario (yellow card) 32'; Ángel (yellow card) 34'; Ruben (yellow card) 55'; De Guzmán (yellow card) 76'	Report	Diarra (yellow card) 5'; Alonso (yellow card) 38'; Pepe (yellow card) 45+1'; Ramos (yellow card) 53' (yellow-red card) 85'; Ronaldo 62'; Özil (red card) 85'; Khedira (yellow card) 88'; Higuaín (yellow card) 90+5'	Stadium: Estadio El Madrigal; Attendance: 20,000; Referee: José Luis Paradas Romero (Andalusia)
Note: Real Madrid assistant coach Rui Faria was dismissed in the 47th minute and head coach José Mourinho was dismissed in the 84th minute.

24 March 2012 30	Real Madrid	5–1	Real Sociedad	Madrid
20:00 CET (UTC+01:00)	Higuaín 6'; Ronaldo 32', 56'; Benzema 40', 49'; Alonso (yellow card) 45+1'	Report	I. Martínez (yellow card) 23'; González (yellow card) 37'; De la Bella (yellow card) 39'; Prieto 42'; Demidov (yellow card) 84'	Stadium: Estadio Santiago Bernabéu; Attendance: 77,000; Referee: Javier Turienzo Álvarez (Castile and León); Man of the Match: Benzema, Ronaldo
Note: Real Madrid head coach José Mourinho was suspended for this match. Assistant coach Aitor Karanka managed Real Madrid in his place.

31 March 2012 31	Osasuna	1–5	Real Madrid	Pamplona
20:00 CEST (UTC+02:00)	Sergio (yellow card) 4'; Nino 48'; Fernández (yellow card) 70'; Lamah (yellow card) 90' (yellow-red card) 90'	Report	Benzema 7'; Ramos (yellow card) 21'; Ronaldo 37', 70'; Higuaín 40', 77'	Stadium: Estadio El Sadar; Attendance: 18,161; Referee: César Muñiz Fernández (Asturias); Man of the Match: Ronaldo, Higuaín
Note: Osasuna coach José Luis Mendilibar was sent off in the 11th minute.

8 April 2012 32	Real Madrid	0–0	Valencia	Madrid
21:30 CEST (UTC+02:00)	Arbeloa (yellow card) 36'; Khedira (yellow card) 47'; Di María (yellow card) 58'	Report	T. Costa (yellow card) 58'; Parejo (yellow card) 65'; Soldado (yellow card) 90+3'	Stadium: Estadio Santiago Bernabéu; Attendance: 79,000; Referee: Carlos Clos Gómez (Aragon); Man of the Match: Casillas, Di María

11 April 2012 33	Atlético Madrid	1–4	Real Madrid	Madrid
22:00 CEST (UTC+02:00)	Falcao 55'; Filipe Luís (yellow card) 61'; Koke (yellow card) 90+2'	Report	Ronaldo 25', 68', 83' (pen.); Arbeloa (yellow card) 35'; Alonso (yellow card) 58'; Higuaín (yellow card) 78'; Callejón 87'	Stadium: Estadio Vicente Calderón; Attendance: 54,000; Referee: Carlos Delgado Ferreiro (Basque Country); Man of the Match: Ronaldo

14 April 2012 34	Real Madrid	3–1	Sporting Gijón	Madrid
20:00 CEST (UTC+02:00)	Ramos (yellow card) 30'; Higuaín 37'; Pepe (yellow card) 56'; Ronaldo 74'; Benzema 82'	Report	Trejo (yellow card) 28'; De las Cuevas 30' (pen.); Canella (yellow card) 32' (yellow-red card) 79'; Cuéllar (yellow card) 37'; Botía (yellow card) 61'; Pablo (yellow card) 65'; Gálvez (yellow card) 76'	Stadium: Estadio Santiago Bernabéu; Attendance: 75,000; Referee: Pedro Jesús Pérez Montero (Andalusia); Man of the Match: Ronaldo, Benzema
Note: Iván Cuéllar was booked while a substitute.

21 April 2012 35	Barcelona	1–2	Real Madrid	Barcelona
20:00 CEST (UTC+02:00)	Busquets (yellow card) 15'; Sánchez 70'; Mascherano (yellow card) 86'	Report	Khedira 17'; Pepe (yellow card) 43'; Alonso (yellow card) 47'; Ronaldo 73'; Özil (yellow card) 77'; Granero (yellow card) 78'	Stadium: Camp Nou; Attendance: 99,252; Referee: Alberto Undiano Mallenco (Navarre); Man of the Match: Ronaldo, Alonso

29 April 2012 36	Real Madrid	3–0	Sevilla	Madrid
12:00 CEST (UTC+02:00)	Ronaldo 19'; Özil (yellow card) 25'; Benzema 48', 52'; Granero (yellow card) 54'; Di María (yellow card) 59'	Report	Deivid (yellow card) 54'; Cala (yellow card) 58'	Stadium: Estadio Santiago Bernabéu; Attendance: 72,000; Referee: Antonio Mateu Lahoz (Valencian Community); Man of the Match: Benzema, Ronaldo

2 May 2012 20	Athletic Bilbao	0–3	Real Madrid	Bilbao
22:00 CEST (UTC+02:00)	Martínez (yellow card) 11' (yellow-red card) 72'; San José (yellow card) 37'; Toquero (yellow card) 45+1'; Pérez (yellow card) 85'	Report	Ramos (yellow card) 12'; Higuaín 16'; Özil 20', (yellow card) 78'; Coentrão (yellow card) 36'; Ronaldo 50'; Arbeloa (yellow card) 64'; Alonso (yellow card) 69'	Stadium: Estadio San Mamés; Attendance: 37,500; Referee: José Antonio Teixeira Vitienes (Cantabria)
Note: Originally scheduled for 22 January.

5 May 2012 37	Granada	1–2	Real Madrid	Granada
21:00 CEST (UTC+02:00)	Jara 5', (yellow card) 61'; Moisés (yellow card) 79' (red card) 90+5'; Benítez (yellow card) 80'; Cortés (yellow card) 88'; Gómez (yellow card) 90+2'; Siqueira (red card) 90+5'	Report	Albiol (yellow card) 25'; Higuaín (yellow card) 65'; Alonso (yellow card) 72'; Marcelo (yellow card) 80'; Ronaldo 81' (pen.); Cortés 90+3' (o.g.)	Stadium: Estadio Nuevo Los Cármenes; Attendance: 22,000; Referee: Carlos Clos Gómez (Aragon)
Note: Moisés Hurtado and Guilherme Siqueira were sent off after the final whistle.

13 May 2012 38	Real Madrid	4–1	Mallorca	Madrid
20:00 CEST (UTC+02:00)	Ronaldo 19'; Benzema 23'; Özil 49', 58'	Report	Castro 52', (yellow card) 62'	Stadium: Estadio Santiago Bernabéu; Attendance: 83,000; Referee: José Luis González González (Castile and León); Man of the Match: Özil

==== Results overview ====
Win Draw Loss

Region	Team	Home score	Away score
(Andalusia)	Granada	5–1	2–1
(Andalusia)	Málaga	1–1	4–0
(Andalusia)	Real Betis	4–1	3–2
(Andalusia)	Sevilla	3–0	6–2
(Community of Madrid)	Atlético Madrid	4–1	4–1
(Community of Madrid)	Getafe	4–2	1–0
(Community of Madrid)	Rayo Vallecano	6–2	1–0
(Basque Country (autonomous community))	Athletic Bilbao	4–1	3–0
(Basque Country (autonomous community))	Real Sociedad	5–1	1–0
(Valencian Community)	Levante	4–2	0–1
(Valencian Community)	Valencia	0–0	3–2
(Valencian Community)	Villarreal	3–0	1–1
(Catalonia)	Barcelona	1–3	2–1
(Catalonia)	Espanyol	5–0	4–0
(Aragon)	Zaragoza	3–1	6–0
(Balearic Islands)	Mallorca	4–1	2–1
(Navarre)	Osasuna	7–1	5–1
(Asturias)	Sporting Gijón	3–1	3–0
(Cantabria)	Racing Santander	4–0	0–0

Last updated: 13 May 2012
Source: RealMadrid.com, LFP

=== Copa del Rey ===
==== Round of 32 ====
13 December 2011 First leg	Ponferradina	0–2	Real Madrid	Ponferrada
20:00 CET (UTC+01)	Rodríguez (yellow card) 58'; Ruiz (yellow card) 65'; Samuel (yellow card) 66'	Report	Albiol (yellow card) 14' (yellow-red card) 69'; Callejón 29'; Ronaldo 74'	Stadium: Estadio El Toralín; Attendance: 8,500; Referee: Ignacio Iglesias Villanueva (Galicia); Man of the Match: Callejón, Ronaldo

20 December 2011 Second leg	Real Madrid	5–1 (7–1 agg.)	Ponferradina	Madrid
20:00 CET (UTC+01)	Callejón 25', 88'; Şahin 44'; Varane 49'; Joselu 79'; Khedira (yellow card) 84'	Report	Acorán 53'; Samuel (yellow card) 86'	Stadium: Estadio Santiago Bernabéu; Attendance: 52,000; Referee: Miguel Ángel Ayza Gámez (Valencian Community); Man of the Match: Callejón, Şahin

==== Round of 16 ====
3 January 2012 First leg	Real Madrid	3–2	Málaga	Madrid
22:00 CET (UTC+01)	Arbeloa (yellow card) 27'; Higuaín (yellow card) 28', (goal) 70'; Khedira 68'; Pepe (yellow card) 74'; Benzema 78'; Alonso (yellow card) 90+2'	Report	Sánchez 10', (yellow card) 57'; Demichelis 29'; Toulalan (yellow card) 77'; Monreal (yellow card) 80'	Stadium: Estadio Santiago Bernabéu; Attendance: 83,500; Referee: Fernando Teixeira Vitienes (Cantabria); Man of the Match: Benzema, Higuaín
Note: Real Madrid assistant coach Rui Faria was dismissed in the 48th minute.

10 January 2012 Second leg	Málaga	0–1 (2–4 agg.)	Real Madrid	Málaga
22:00 CET (UTC+01)	Demichelis (yellow card) 43'; Rondón (yellow card) 78'	Report	Diarra (yellow card) 18'; Arbeloa (yellow card) 31' (yellow-red card) 88'; Benzema 72'; Ramos (yellow card) 90'	Stadium: Estadio La Rosaleda; Attendance: 27,000; Referee: Miguel Ángel Pérez Lasa (Basque Country); Man of the Match: Benzema, Marcelo

==== Quarter-finals ====
18 January 2012 First leg	Real Madrid	1–2	Barcelona	Madrid
22:00 CET (UTC+01)	Ronaldo 11'; Pepe (yellow card) 17'; Coentrão (yellow card) 59'; Callejón (yellow card) 68'; Carvalho (yellow card) 87'	Report	Piqué (yellow card) 20'; Puyol 49', (yellow card) 79'; Busquets (yellow card) 55'; Abidal 77'	Stadium: Estadio Santiago Bernabéu; Attendance: 83,500; Referee: César Muñiz Fernández (Asturias); Man of the Match: Ronaldo

25 January 2012 Second leg	Barcelona	2–2 (4–3 agg.)	Real Madrid	Barcelona
22:00 CET (UTC+01)	Pedro 43'; Messi (yellow card) 45'; Alves 45+3'; Puyol (yellow card) 90+1'	Report	Diarra (yellow card) 27'; Ramos (yellow card) 33' (yellow-red card) 88'; Casillas (yellow card) 45+2'; Ronaldo (yellow card) 54', (goal) 68'; Benzema 72'; Coentrão (yellow card) 81'; Granero (yellow card) 90'; Callejón (yellow card) 90+1'; Pepe (yellow card) 90+2'	Stadium: Camp Nou; Attendance: 95,468; Referee: Fernando Teixeira Vitienes (Cantabria); Man of the Match: Özil, Benzema

Last updated: 25 January 2012
Source: RFEF

=== UEFA Champions League ===
==== Group stage ====
Pos	Team	Pld	W	D	L	GF	GA	GD	Pts	Qualification
1	(Spain) Real Madrid	6	6	0	0	19	2	+17	18	Advance to knockout phase
2	(France) Lyon	6	2	2	2	9	7	+2	8 (Note: Tied on head-to-head results. Overall goal difference was used as the tiebreaker.)	Advance to knockout phase
3	(Netherlands) Ajax	6	2	2	2	6	6	0	8	Transfer to Europa League
4	(Croatia) Dinamo Zagreb	6	0	0	6	3	22	−19	0	

Source: Soccerway
Notes:

14 September 2011 1	Dinamo Zagreb (Croatia)	0–1	(Spain) Real Madrid	Zagreb, Croatia
20:45 CEST (UTC+02:00)	Leko (yellow card) 39'	Report	Di María 53'; Marcelo (yellow card) 70' (yellow-red card) 73'; Pepe (yellow card) 90+2'	Stadium: Stadion Maksimir; Attendance: 27,055; Referee: Svein Oddvar Moen (Norway); Man of the Match: Di María
Note: José Mourinho was suspended for this match. Assistant coach Aitor Karanka managed Real Madrid in his place.

27 September 2011 2	Real Madrid (Spain)	3–0	(Netherlands) Ajax	Madrid, Spain
20:45 CEST (UTC+02:00)	Carvalho (yellow card) 19'; Ronaldo 25'; Kaká 41'; Benzema 49'	Report		Stadium: Estadio Santiago Bernabéu; Attendance: 70,320; Referee: Mark Clattenburg (England); Man of the Match: Kaká
Note: José Mourinho was suspended for this match. Assistant coach Aitor Karanka managed Real Madrid in his place.

18 October 2011 3	Real Madrid (Spain)	4–0	(France) Lyon	Madrid, Spain
20:45 CEST (UTC+02:00)	Benzema 19'; Alonso (yellow card) 40'; Khedira 47'; Lloris 55' (o.g.); Ramos 81'; Ronaldo (yellow card) 85'	Report	B. Koné (yellow card) 69'; Briand (yellow card) 75'	Stadium: Estadio Santiago Bernabéu; Attendance: 76,102; Referee: Cüneyt Çakır (Turkey); Man of the Match: Benzema

2 November 2011 4	Lyon (France)	0–2	(Spain) Real Madrid	Lyon, France
20:45 CET (UTC+01:00)	Cris (yellow card) 8'; Källström (yellow card) 57'	Report	Ronaldo 24', 69' (pen.); Khedira (yellow card) 50'; Diarra (yellow card) 59'; Albiol (yellow card) 75'; Higuaín (yellow card) 77'	Stadium: Stade de Gerland; Attendance: 40,099; Referee: Nicola Rizzoli (Italy); Man of the Match: Ronaldo

22 November 2011 5	Real Madrid (Spain)	6–2	(Croatia) Dinamo Zagreb	Madrid, Spain
20:45 CET (UTC+01:00)	Benzema 2', 66'; Callejón 6', 49'; Higuaín 9'; Özil 20'	Report	Bećiraj 81', (yellow card) 89'; Tomečak 90'; Cufré (yellow card) 90+2'	Stadium: Estadio Santiago Bernabéu; Attendance: 65,415; Referee: Alan Kelly (Ireland); Man of the Match: Benzema

7 December 2011 6	Ajax (Netherlands)	0–3	(Spain) Real Madrid	Amsterdam, Netherlands
20:45 CET (UTC+01:00)	Vertonghen (yellow card) 37'	Report	Callejón 14', 90+2'; Higuaín 41'; Arbeloa (yellow card) 58'	Stadium: Amsterdam Arena; Attendance: 51,557; Referee: Manuel De Sousa (Portugal); Man of the Match: Higuaín

==== Knockout phase ====
===== Round of 16 =====
21 February 2012 First leg	CSKA Moscow (Russia)	1–1	(Spain) Real Madrid	Moscow, Russia
18:00 CET (UTC+01:00)	Wernbloom (yellow card) 67', (goal) 90+3'	Report	Ronaldo 28'; Alonso (yellow card) 46'; Ramos (yellow card) 72'; Coentrão (yellow card) 82'	Stadium: Luzhniki Stadium; Attendance: 70,000; Referee: Björn Kuipers (Netherlands); Man of the Match: Alonso

14 March 2012 Second leg	Real Madrid (Spain)	4–1 (5–2 agg.)	(Russia) CSKA Moscow	Madrid, Spain
20:45 CET (UTC+01:00)	Higuaín 26'; Alonso (yellow card) 50'; Ronaldo 55', 90+4'; Benzema 70'	Report	Chepchugov (yellow card) 15'; V. Berezutski (yellow card) 32'; Musa (yellow card) 39'; Tošić 77'; Mamayev (yellow card) 84'	Stadium: Estadio Santiago Bernabéu; Attendance: 67,743; Referee: Stéphane Lannoy (France); Man of the Match: Ronaldo

===== Quarter-finals =====
27 March 2012 First leg	APOEL (Cyprus)	0–3	(Spain) Real Madrid	Nicosia, Cyprus
20:45 CEST (UTC+02:00)		Report	Benzema 74', 90'; Kaká 82'	Stadium: GSP Stadium; Attendance: 22,385; Referee: Felix Brych (Germany); Man of the Match: Kaká

4 April 2012 Second leg	Real Madrid (Spain)	5–2 (8–2 agg.)	(Cyprus) APOEL	Madrid, Spain
20:45 CEST (UTC+02:00)	Ronaldo 26', 75'; Kaká 37'; Callejón 80'; Di María 84'	Report	Manduca 67'; Poursaitidis (yellow card) 75'; Solari 82' (pen.)	Stadium: Estadio Santiago Bernabéu; Attendance: 54,627; Referee: Gianluca Rocchi (Italy); Man of the Match: Kaká

===== Semi-finals =====
17 April 2012 First leg	Bayern Munich (Germany)	2–1	(Spain) Real Madrid	Munich, Germany
20:45 CEST (UTC+02:00)	Ribéry 17'; Badstuber (yellow card) 31'; Robben (yellow card) 37'; Lahm (yellow card) 64'; Gómez 90'	Report	Özil 53'; Alonso (yellow card) 56'; Coentrão (yellow card) 56'; Di María (yellow card) 60'; Ramos (yellow card) 76'; Higuaín (yellow card) 90+2'; Marcelo (yellow card) 90+4'	Stadium: Allianz Arena; Attendance: 66,000; Referee: Howard Webb (England); Man of the Match: Ribéry

25 April 2012 Second leg	Real Madrid (Spain)	2–1 (a.e.t.) (3–3 agg.) (1–3 p)	(Germany) Bayern Munich	Madrid, Spain
20:45 CEST (UTC+02:00)	Ronaldo 6' (pen.), 14'; Pepe (yellow card) 27'; Arbeloa (yellow card) 59'; Granero (yellow card) 115'	Report	Alaba (yellow card) 5'; Robben 27' (pen.), (yellow card) 90'; Luiz Gustavo (yellow card) 102'; Badstuber (yellow card) 104'	Stadium: Estadio Santiago Bernabéu; Attendance: 71,654; Referee: Viktor Kassai (Hungary); Man of the Match: Robben
	Penalties
	Ronaldo (penalty missed); Kaká (penalty missed); Alonso (penalty scored); Ramos (penalty missed)		(penalty scored) Alaba; (penalty scored) Gómez; (penalty missed) Kroos; (penalty missed) Lahm; (penalty scored) Schweinsteiger

Last updated: 25 April 2012
Source: Matches

== Statistics ==
=== Players statistics ===
No.	Pos	Nat	Player	Total		La Liga		Champions League		Copa del Rey	
No.	Pos	Nat	Player	Apps	Goals	Apps	Goals	Apps	Goals	Apps	Goals
1	GK	(Spain) ESP	Iker Casillas	51	-44	37	-31	10	-7	4	-6
17	DF	(Spain) ESP	Alvaro Arbeloa	38	0	26	0	8+1	0	3	0
4	DF	(Spain) ESP	Sergio Ramos	49	4	34	3	11	1	3+1	0
3	DF	(Portugal) POR	Pepe	43	1	29	1	9	0	5	0
12	DF	(Brazil) BRA	Marcelo	42	3	31+1	3	5+2	0	2+1	0
6	DM	(Germany) GER	Sami Khedira	40	4	20+8	2	8	1	3+1	1
14	DM	(Spain) ESP	Xabi Alonso	50	1	35+1	1	9+1	0	4	0
10	MF	(Germany) GER	Mesut Ozil	50	6	30+5	4	10	2	2+3	0
20	FW	(Argentina) ARG	Gonzalo Higuain	52	26	18+17	22	5+7	3	5	1
9	FW	(France) FRA	Karim Benzema	50	31	26+8	21	10+1	7	2+3	3
7	FW	(Portugal) POR	Cristiano Ronaldo	53	59	37+1	46	10	10	5	3
13	GK	(Spain) ESP	Antonio Adan	5	-2	1	-1	2	0	2	-1
8	AM	(Brazil) BRA	Kaká	39	8	17+10	5	4+4	3	4	0
22	MF	(Argentina) ARG	Angel Di Maria	30	7	16+7	5	5+2	2		
24	DM	(France) FRA	Lassana Diarra	25	0	15+2	0	2+2	0	4	0
15	DF	(Portugal) POR	Fabio Coentrao	31	0	12+8	0	7+1	0	3	0
11	DM	(Spain) ESP	Esteban Granero	28	0	7+10	0	2+5	0	1+3	0
19	DF	(France) FRA	Raphaël Varane	15	2	7+2	1	4	0	2	1
2	DF	(Portugal) POR	Ricardo Carvalho	11	0	7+1	0	2	0	1	0
21	MF	(Spain) ESP	Jose Callejon	35	13	5+20	5	3+2	5	3+2	3
18	DF	(Spain) ESP	Raul Albiol	17	0	5+5	0	1+4	0	2	0
5	MF	(Turkey) TUR	Nuri Sahin	10	1	2+2	0	4	0	2	1
16	MF	(Turkey) TUR	Hamit Altintop	12	1	1+4	1	1+3	0	3	0
28	MF	(Spain) ESP	Jesé	2	0	0+1	0	0	0	0+1	0
26	FW	(Spain) ESP	Alvaro Morata	1	0	0+1	0				
23	DF	(Portugal) POR	Pedro Mendes	1	0	0	0	0+1	0		
27	DF	(Spain) ESP	Nacho	1	0	0	0	0	0	0+1	0
29	FW	(Spain) ESP	Joselu	1	1	0	0	0	0	0+1	1
31	GK	(Spain) ESP	Fernando Pacheco	1	0	0	0	0	0	0+1	0
38	DF	(Spain) ESP	Jorge Casado	1	0	0	0	0	0	0+1	0

- Source: https://www.bdfutbol.com/en/t/t2011-122.html

=== Minutes played ===
				Total				La Liga		UEFA Champions League		Copa del Rey		Others^{1}		
N	Pos.	Name	Nat.	GS	App	Gls	Min	App	Gls	App	Gls	App	Gls	App	Gls	Notes
1	GK	Iker Casillas	(Spain)	53	53		4997	37		10		4		2		
17	RB	Álvaro Arbeloa	(Spain)	37	38		3296	26		9		3				
3	CB	Pepe	(Portugal)	45	45	1	4170	29	1	9		5		2		
4	CB	Sergio Ramos	(Spain)	50	51	4	4673	34	3	11	1	4		2		
12	LB	Marcelo	(Brazil)	39	44	3	3679	32	3	7		3		2		
6	DM	Sami Khedira	(Germany)	33	42	4	3073	28	2	8	1	4	1	2		
14	CM	Xabi Alonso	(Spain)	50	52	2	4694	36	1	10		4		2	1	
7	RW	Cristiano Ronaldo	(Portugal)	54	55	60	5098	38	46	10	10	5	3	2	1	
10	AM	Mesut Özil	(Germany)	45	52	7	4068	35	4	10	2	5		2	1	
22	LW	Ángel Di María	(Argentina)	23	32	7	1966	23	5	7	2			2		
9	ST	Karim Benzema	(France)	40	52	32	3561	34	21	11	7	5	3	2	1	
13	GK	Antonio Adán	(Spain)	5	5		454	1		2		2				
20	ST	Gonzalo Higuaín	(Argentina)	28	54	26	2785	35	22	12	3	5	1	2		
15	LWB	Fábio Coentrão	(Portugal)	23	33		2330	20		8		3		2		
8	AM	Kaká	(Brazil)	25	40	8	2138	27	5	8	3	4		1		
24	DM	Lassana Diarra	(France)	21	25		1692	17		4		4				
21	LW	José Callejón	(Spain)	11	36	13	1366	25	5	5	5	5	3	1		
19	CB	Raphaël Varane	(France)	13	15	2	1219	9	1	4		2	1			
2	CB	Ricardo Carvalho	(Portugal)	12	13		1105	8		2		1		2		
11	CM	Esteban Granero	(Spain)	10	28		1069	16		8		4				
18	CB	Raúl Albiol	(Spain)	8	17		1010	10		5		2				
5	CM	Nuri Şahin	(Turkey)	8	10	1	656	4		4		2	1			
16	RM	Hamit Altıntop	(Turkey)	5	12	1	636	5	1	4		3				
38	LB	Jorge Casado	(Spain)	1	1		71					1				
23	CB	Pedro Mendes	(Portugal)		1		26			1						
28	LW	Jesé	(Spain)		2		24	1				1				
27	LB	Nacho	(Spain)		1		20					1				
29	ST	Joselu	(Spain)		1	1	13					1	1			
31	GK	Fernando Pacheco	(Spain)		1		9					1				
26	ST	Álvaro Morata	(Spain)		1		9	1								

Last updated: 13 May 2012
Source: Match reports in competitive matches, realmadrid.com, LFP.es, ESPN Soccernet
Ordered by start team and position on pitch (from back right to front left), minutes played, squad number
0 shown as blank
^{1} Other Competitions: Supercopa de España

=== Goals ===
R	Player	Position	La Liga	Champions League	Copa del Rey	Supercopa de España	Total
1	(Portugal) Cristiano Ronaldo	LW	46	10	3	1	60
2	(France) Karim Benzema	ST	21	7	3	1	32
3	(Argentina) Gonzalo Higuaín	ST	22	3	1	0	26
4	(Spain) José Callejón	RW	5	5	3	0	13
5	(Brazil) Kaká	AM	5	3	0	0	8
6	(Argentina) Ángel Di María	LW	5	2	0	0	7
6	(Germany) Mesut Özil	AM	4	2	0	1	7
8	(Spain) Sergio Ramos	RB	3	1	0	0	4
8	(Germany) Sami Khedira	DM	2	1	1	0	4
10	(Brazil) Marcelo	LB	3	0	0	0	3
11	(France) Raphaël Varane	CB	1	0	1	0	2
11	(Spain) Xabi Alonso	CM	1	0	0	1	2
13	(Portugal) Pepe	CB	1	0	0	0	1
13	(Turkey) Hamit Altıntop	RM	1	0	0	0	1
13	(Turkey) Nuri Şahin	CM	0	0	1	0	1
13	(Spain) Joselu	ST	0	0	1	0	1

Last updated: 13 May 2012
Source: Match reports in Competitive matches

=== Disciplinary record ===
N	P	Nat.	Name	La Liga			Champions League			Copa del Rey			Supercopa de España			Total			Notes
N	P	Nat.	Name	Yellow card	Second yellow card	Red card	Yellow card	Second yellow card	Red card	Yellow card	Second yellow card	Red card	Yellow card	Second yellow card	Red card	Yellow card	Second yellow card	Red card	Notes
10	AM	(Germany)	Mesut Özil	5		1									1	5		2	
12	LB	(Brazil)	Marcelo	3			1	1					1		1	5	1	1	
4	CB	(Spain)	Sergio Ramos	12			2			1	1		1			16	1		
3	CB	(Portugal)	Pepe	9	1		2			3			1			15	1		
17	RB	(Spain)	Álvaro Arbeloa	9			2			1	1					12	1		
6	DM	(Germany)	Sami Khedira	3	1		1			1			2			7	1		
22	LW	(Argentina)	Ángel Di María	5	1		1									6	1		
18	CB	(Spain)	Raúl Albiol	1			1				1					2	1		
14	CM	(Spain)	Xabi Alonso	13			4			1			1			19			
15	LB	(Portugal)	Fábio Coentrão	5			2			2			2			11			
24	DM	(France)	Lassana Diarra	5			1			2						8			
2	CB	(Portugal)	Ricardo Carvalho	5			1			1						7			
20	ST	(Argentina)	Gonzalo Higuaín	4			2			1						7			
7	RW	(Portugal)	Cristiano Ronaldo	4			1			1			1			7			
11	CM	(Spain)	Esteban Granero	3			1			1						5			
8	AM	(Brazil)	Kaká	3												3			
21	RW	(Spain)	José Callejón	1						1						2			
1	GK	(Spain)	Iker Casillas	1						1						2			

Last updated: 13 May 2012
Source: Competitive matches and LFP.com, sportec.es
Ordered by (red card) , (second yellow card) and (yellow card)
(yellow card) = Number of bookings; (second yellow card) = Number of sending offs after a second yellow card; (red card) = Number of sending offs by a direct red card.

=== Overall ===
	Total	Home	Away
Games played	58	29	29
Games won	46	24	22
Games drawn	7	3	4
Games lost	5	2	3
Biggest win	6–0 vs Zaragoza; 7–1 vs Osasuna	7–1 vs Osasuna	6–0 vs Zaragoza
Biggest loss	1–3 vs Barcelona	1–3 vs Barcelona	2–3 vs Barcelona; 0–1 vs Levante; 1–2 vs Bayern Munich
Biggest win (League)	6–0 vs Zaragoza; 7–1 vs Osasuna	7–1 vs Osasuna	6–0 vs Zaragoza
Biggest win (Cup)	5–1 vs Ponferradina	5–1 vs Ponferradina	2–0 vs Ponferradina
Biggest win (Europe)	4–0 vs Lyon; 6–2 vs Dinamo Zagreb	4–0 vs Lyon; 6–2 vs Dinamo Zagreb	3–0 vs Ajax; 3–0 vs APOEL
Biggest loss (League)	1–3 vs Barcelona	1–3 vs Barcelona	0–1 vs Levante
Biggest loss (Cup)	1–2 vs Barcelona	1–2 vs Barcelona	
Biggest loss (Europe)	1–2 vs Bayern Munich		1–2 vs Bayern Munich
Clean sheets	22	7	15
Goals scored	174	105	69
Goals conceded	53	32	21
Goal difference	+121	+73	+48
Average GF per game	3	3.62	2.38
Average GA per game	0.91	1.1	0.72
Yellow cards	138	53	85
Red cards	10	1	9
Most appearances	(Portugal) Cristiano Ronaldo (55)	–	
Most minutes played	(Portugal) Cristiano Ronaldo (5098)	–	
Most goals	(Portugal) Cristiano Ronaldo (60)	–	
Most assists	(Germany) Mesut Özil (24)	–	
Points	145/174 (83.33%)	75/87 (86.21%)	70/87 (80.46%)
Winning rate	79.31%	82.76%	75.86%

Last updated: 13 May 2012
Source: Competitive matches
