= 2011 Supercopa de España =

| Real Madrid | Barcelona |
| 4 | 5 |
- on aggregate

First leg
| Real Madrid | Barcelona |
| 2 | 2 |
- Date: 14 August 2011
- Venue: Santiago Bernabéu, Madrid
- Referee: Fernando Teixeira Vitienes
- Attendance: 80,000
- Weather: Clear; 31 °C (88 °F)

Second leg
| Barcelona | Real Madrid |
| 3 | 2 |
- Date: 17 August 2011
- Venue: Camp Nou, Barcelona
- Referee: David Fernández Borbalán
- Attendance: 92,965
- Weather: Partly cloudy 26 °C (79 °F)

The 2011 Supercopa de España was a two-legged Spanish football match-up that was played on 14 and 17 August 2011. It was contested by Barcelona, the 2010–11 La Liga winners, and Real Madrid, the 2010–11 Copa del Rey winners. Barcelona won 5–4 on aggregate for their record-extending tenth Supercopa de España title.

== Match details ==
=== First leg ===
14 August 2011
22:00 CEST

| Real Madrid | 2–2 | Barcelona |
|---|---|---|
| Özil 13'; Alonso 54' | Report | Villa 36'; Messi 45+1' |

Santiago Bernabéu, Madrid
Attendance: 80,000
Referee: Fernando Teixeira Vitienes

| Real Madrid | Barcelona |

| GK | 1 | (Spain) Iker Casillas (c) |
| RB | 4 | (Spain) Sergio Ramos |
| CB | 3 | (Portugal) Pepe |
| CB | 2 | (Portugal) Ricardo Carvalho |
| LB | 12 | (Brazil) Marcelo |
| CM | 6 | (Germany) Sami Khedira | (yellow card) 32' | (substituted off) 58' |
| CM | 14 | (Spain) Xabi Alonso | (yellow card) 78' |
| RW | 22 | (Argentina) Ángel Di María | | (substituted off) 54' |
| LW | 7 | (Portugal) Cristiano Ronaldo |
| AM | 10 | (Germany) Mesut Özil |
| CF | 9 | (France) Karim Benzema | | (substituted off) 81' |
Substitutes:
| GK | 13 | (Spain) Antonio Adán |
| DF | 15 | (Portugal) Fábio Coentrão | (yellow card) 90+1' | (substituted on) 54' |
| DF | 17 | (Spain) Álvaro Arbeloa |
| DF | 19 | (France) Raphaël Varane |
| MF | 8 | (Brazil) Kaká |
| FW | 20 | (Argentina) Gonzalo Higuaín | | (substituted on) 81' |
| FW | 21 | (Spain) José Callejón | | (substituted on) 58' |
Manager:
(Portugal) José Mourinho

| GK | 1 | (Spain) Víctor Valdés (c) |
| RB | 2 | (Brazil) Dani Alves | (yellow card) 90+3' |
| CB | 14 | (Argentina) Javier Mascherano |
| CB | 22 | (France) Eric Abidal |
| LB | 21 | (Brazil) Adriano | | (substituted off) 62' |
| DM | 15 | (Mali) Seydou Keita |
| CM | 11 | (Spain) Thiago | | (substituted off) 58' |
| CM | 8 | (Spain) Andrés Iniesta |
| RW | 9 | (Chile) Alexis Sánchez | (yellow card) 55' |
| LW | 7 | (Spain) David Villa | | (substituted off) 73' |
| CF | 10 | (Argentina) Lionel Messi |
Substitutes:
| GK | 13 | (Spain) José Manuel Pinto |
| DF | 3 | (Spain) Gerard Piqué | | (substituted on) 62' |
| DF | 24 | (Spain) Andreu Fontàs |
| MF | 6 | (Spain) Xavi | | (substituted on) 58' |
| MF | 16 | (Spain) Sergio Busquets |
| MF | 28 | (Mexico) Jonathan dos Santos |
| FW | 17 | (Spain) Pedro | | (substituted on) 73' |
Manager:
(Spain) Pep Guardiola

Assistant referees:
Victoriano Díaz Casado
Manuel Ángel Torre Cimiano
Fourth official:
José Antonio López Toca

=== Second leg ===
17 August 2011
23:00 CEST

| Barcelona | 3–2 | Real Madrid |
|---|---|---|
| Iniesta 15'; Messi 45', 88' | Report | Ronaldo 20'; Benzema 82' |

Camp Nou, Barcelona
Attendance: 92,965
Referee: David Fernández Borbalán

| Barcelona | Real Madrid |

| GK | 1 | (Spain) Víctor Valdés | | (yellow card) 90+1' |
| RB | 2 | (Brazil) Dani Alves |
| CB | 14 | (Argentina) Javier Mascherano | | (yellow card) 54' |
| CB | 3 | (Spain) Gerard Piqué |
| LB | 22 | (France) Eric Abidal |
| DM | 16 | (Spain) Sergio Busquets | (substituted off) 84' |
| CM | 6 | (Spain) Xavi (c) | | (yellow card) 42' |
| CM | 8 | (Spain) Andrés Iniesta |
| RW | 17 | (Spain) Pedro | (substituted off) 83' |
| LW | 7 | (Spain) David Villa | (substituted off) 74' | (red card) 90+5' |
| CF | 10 | (Argentina) Lionel Messi |
Substitutes:
| GK | 13 | (Spain) José Manuel Pinto |
| DF | 21 | (Brazil) Adriano | (substituted on) 74' |
| DF | 24 | (Spain) Andreu Fontàs |
| MF | 4 | (Spain) Cesc Fàbregas | (substituted on) 83' |
| MF | 11 | (Spain) Thiago |
| MF | 15 | (Mali) Seydou Keita | (substituted on) 84' |
| FW | 9 | (Chile) Alexis Sánchez |
Manager:
(Spain) Pep Guardiola

| GK | 1 | (Spain) Iker Casillas (c) |
| RB | 4 | (Spain) Sergio Ramos | | (yellow card) 76' |
| CB | 3 | (Portugal) Pepe | | (yellow card) 62' |
| CB | 2 | (Portugal) Ricardo Carvalho |
| LB | 15 | (Portugal) Fábio Coentrão | | (yellow card) 84' |
| CM | 14 | (Spain) Xabi Alonso |
| CM | 6 | (Germany) Sami Khedira | (substituted off) 46' | (yellow card) 28' |
| RW | 22 | (Argentina) Ángel Di María | (substituted off) 64' |
| LW | 7 | (Portugal) Cristiano Ronaldo | | (yellow card) 54' |
| AM | 10 | (Germany) Mesut Özil | (substituted off) 78' | (red card) 90+5' |
| CF | 9 | (France) Karim Benzema |
Substitutes:
| GK | 13 | (Spain) Antonio Adán |
| DF | 12 | (Brazil) Marcelo | (substituted on) 46' | (red card) 90+4' |
| DF | 17 | (Spain) Álvaro Arbeloa |
| DF | 18 | (Spain) Raúl Albiol |
| MF | 8 | (Brazil) Kaká | (substituted on) 78' |
| FW | 20 | (Argentina) Gonzalo Higuaín | (substituted on) 64' |
| FW | 21 | (Spain) José Callejón |
Manager:
(Portugal) José Mourinho

Assistant referees:
Raúl Cabañero Martínez
Jorge Canelo Prieto
Fourth official:
Alonso Vizuete Sánchez

== See also ==
- El Clásico
- 2011–12 La Liga
- 2011–12 Copa del Rey
- 2011–12 FC Barcelona season
- 2011–12 Real Madrid CF season
