= Gerd Müller =

German footballer (1945–2021)

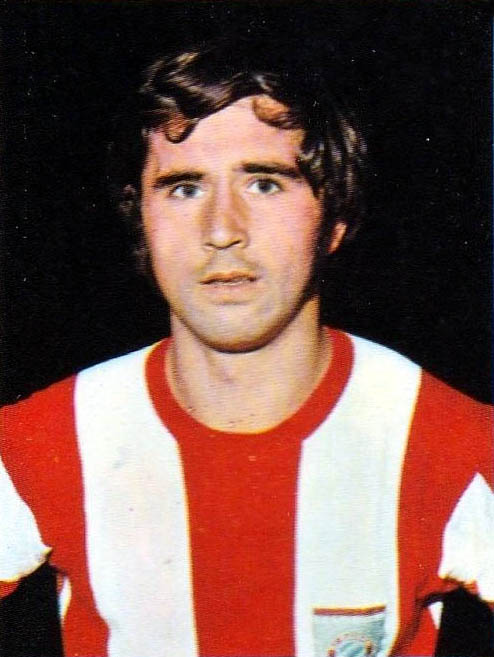
- Müller with Bayern Munich in 1973

Personal information
- Full name: Gerhard Müller
- Date of birth: 3 November 1945
- Place of birth: Nördlingen, Bavaria, Germany
- Date of death: 15 August 2021 (aged 75)
- Place of death: Wolfratshausen, Bavaria, Germany
- Height: 1.76 m (5 ft 9 in)
- Position: Striker

Youth career
- 1958–1963: 1861 Nördlingen

Senior career*
Years	Team	Apps	(Gls)
1963–1964	1861 Nördlingen	31	(51)
1964–1979	Bayern Munich	453	(398)
1979–1981	Fort Lauderdale Strikers	71	(38)
Total		555	(487)

International career
1966	West Germany U23	1	(1)
1966–1974	West Germany	62	(68)

Managerial career
- 1992–2014: Bayern Munich II (assistant)
Medal record
Men's football
Representing West Germany
FIFA World Cup
Winner	1974 West Germany
Third place	1970 Mexico
UEFA European Championship
Winner	1972 Belgium
- * Club domestic league appearances and goals

Gerhard "Gerd" Müller (German: [ɡɛʁt ˈmʏlɐ]; 3 November 1945 – 15 August 2021) was a German professional footballer. A prolific striker, especially in and around the six-yard box, he is widely regarded as one of the greatest goalscorers and players in the history of the sport. With success at both the club level and the international level, he is one of eleven players to have won the FIFA World Cup, the UEFA Champions League and the Ballon d'Or.

At international level with West Germany, he scored 68 goals in 62 appearances, and at club level, in 15 years with Bayern Munich, in which he scored 365 goals in 427 Bundesliga matches, he became—and still is—record holder of that league. In 74 European club games he scored 65 goals. Averaging over a goal a game with West Germany, Müller is currently joint-29th on the list of all time international goalscorers, despite having played fewer matches than every other player in the top 37. Among the top scorers, he has the third-highest goal-to-game ratio. He also had the highest ratio of 0.97 goals per game in the European Cup, scoring 34 goals in 35 matches.

Nicknamed "Bomber der Nation" ("the nation's Bomber") or simply "Der Bomber", Müller was named European Footballer of the Year in 1970. After a successful season at Bayern Munich, he scored ten goals at the 1970 FIFA World Cup for West Germany where he received the Golden Boot as top goalscorer, before winning the 1970 Ballon d'Or. In 1972, he won the UEFA European Championship and was the top goalscorer, scoring two goals in the final. Two years later, he scored 4 goals in the 1974 FIFA World Cup, including the winning goal in the final.

Müller held the all-time goal-scoring record in the World Cup with 14 goals for 32 years. In 1999, Müller was ranked ninth in the European Player of the Century election held by the International Federation of Football History & Statistics (IFFHS), and he was voted 13th in the IFFHS' World Player of the Century election. In 2004, Pelé named Müller in the FIFA 100 list of the world's greatest living players.

== Early life ==
Gerhard Müller was born on 3 November 1945 in Nördlingen, Bavaria, Germany, the son of Johann Heinrich Müller and Christina Carolina Jung.

== Club career ==
=== TSV 1861 Nördlingen ===
Müller began his football career at his hometown club TSV 1861 Nördlingen youth ranks in 1958. In 1963 he was promoted to the first team and he scored 51 league goals in 31 appearances in his first season in the Bayernliga, Bavaria's regional league.

=== Bayern Munich ===
In 1963, aged 18, Müller joined Bayern Munich, where he teamed up with future stars Franz Beckenbauer and Sepp Maier. The club, which would go on to become the most successful German club in history, was then still in the Regionalliga Süd (Regional League South), which was one level below the Bundesliga at the time.

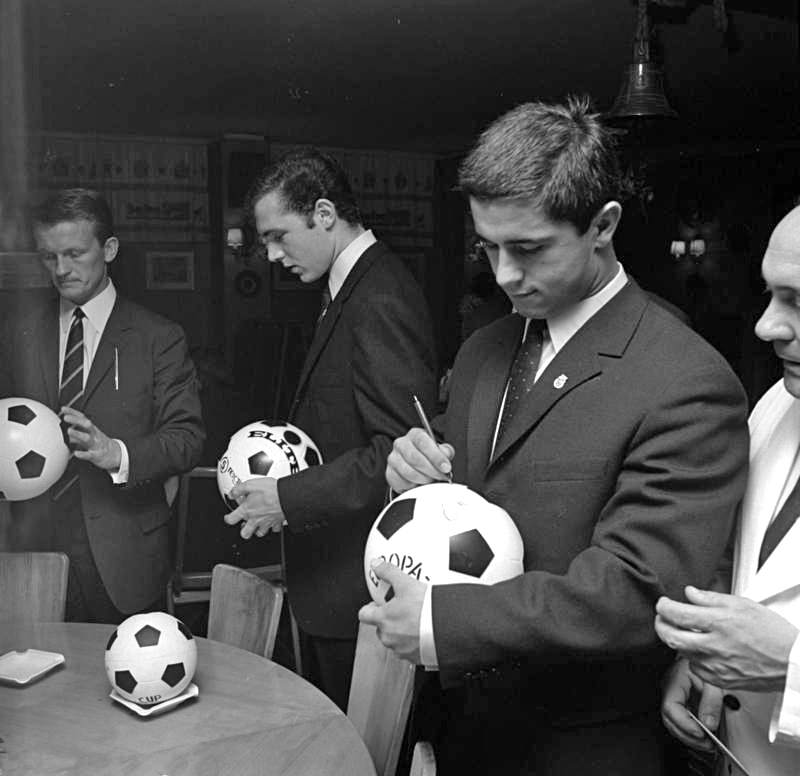
Müller autographing a football in 1967. To his left are Franz Beckenbauer and Werner Olk

After one season, Bayern Munich advanced to the Bundesliga and started a long string of successes. With his club, Müller amassed titles during the 1960s and 1970s: he won the German Championship four times, the DFB-Pokal four times, the European Cup three consecutive years (the first West German team to win it; Müller scored in the 1974 final replay and the 1975 final), the Intercontinental Cup once, and the European Cup Winners' Cup once.

An opportunistic goal-scorer, Müller also became German top scorer seven times and European top scorer twice. Müller scored 365 goals in 427 Bundesliga matches for Bayern Munich, 53 goals over the second-most successful Bundesliga scorer, Robert Lewandowski, since 2022.

==== Club goal records ====
At his peak, Müller held the single-season Bundesliga record with 40 goals in season 1971–72, a record that would be held until Lewandowski scored 41 goals during the 2020–21 season, also for Bayern Munich. Then, Müller also held the record for most club goals scored in all European club competitions in one season for 40 years, scoring 67 goals during the 1972–73 FC Bayern Munich season, and 85 (72 for Munich, 13 West Germany) goals in total during 1972. However, that record was surpassed by Lionel Messi of FC Barcelona in Spain who scored 73 in the 2011/12 season, and 91 goals in the calendar year of 2012.

=== Fort Lauderdale Strikers ===
After his career in the Bundesliga, Müller went to the United States, where he joined the Fort Lauderdale Strikers (based in the Miami area) of the North American Soccer League (NASL) in 1979. He played three seasons with this team, scoring 38 goals, and reached, but lost, the league final in 1980.

== International career ==
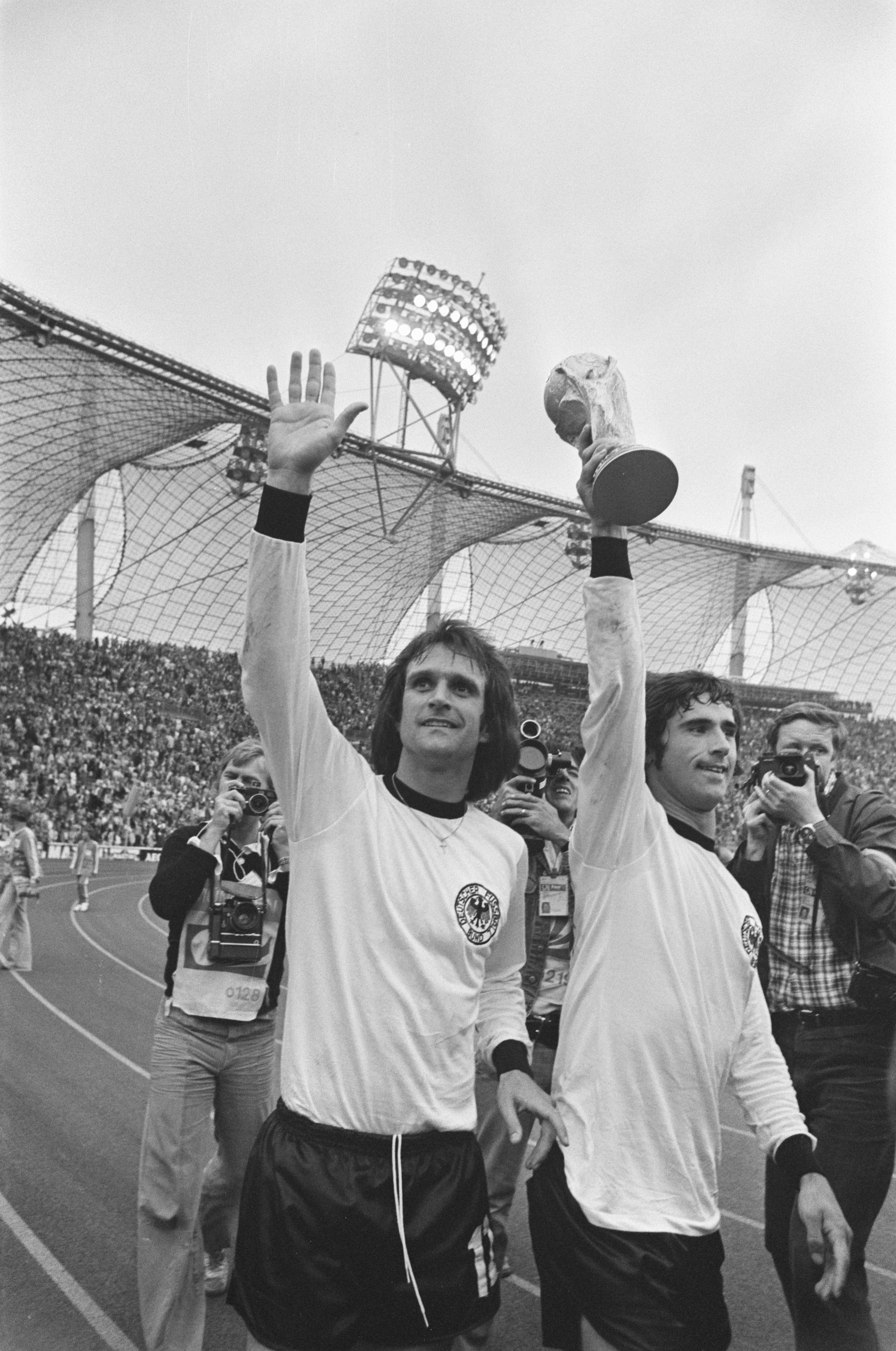
Müller (right) celebrating after winning the 1974 FIFA World Cup. On the left is Wolfgang Overath.

Müller scored 68 goals in 62 games for West Germany. He was Germany's all-time leading scorer for almost 40 years until surpassed by Miroslav Klose in 2014, though Klose required over double the number of caps to do so, scoring his 69th goal in his 132nd appearance. Müller is one of six players to reach 50 international goals in under 50 appearances, doing so in 41 games. Müller's international career started in 1966 and ended on 7 July 1974 with victory at the 1974 FIFA World Cup at his home stadium in Munich. He scored the winning goal for the 2–1 victory over Johan Cruyff's Netherlands in the final and later having a goal wrongfully disallowed for offside. His four goals in that tournament and his ten goals at the 1970 FIFA World Cup combined made him the all-time highest FIFA World Cup goalscorer at the time with 14 goals. His record stood until the 2006 tournament, coincidentally held in Germany, when it was broken by Brazilian striker Ronaldo, who also required more matches than Müller to achieve his tally. Müller also participated in the 1972 European Championship, becoming top scorer with four goals (including two in the final) and winning the Championship with the West German team.

Müller quit playing for West Germany after the 1974 FIFA World Cup triumph. While there was an argument with the German Football Association (DFB) at the post-tournament celebration, when officials' wives were allowed to attend but players' wives were not, Müller said that he had made the decision already before the end of the tournament.

== Life after football ==
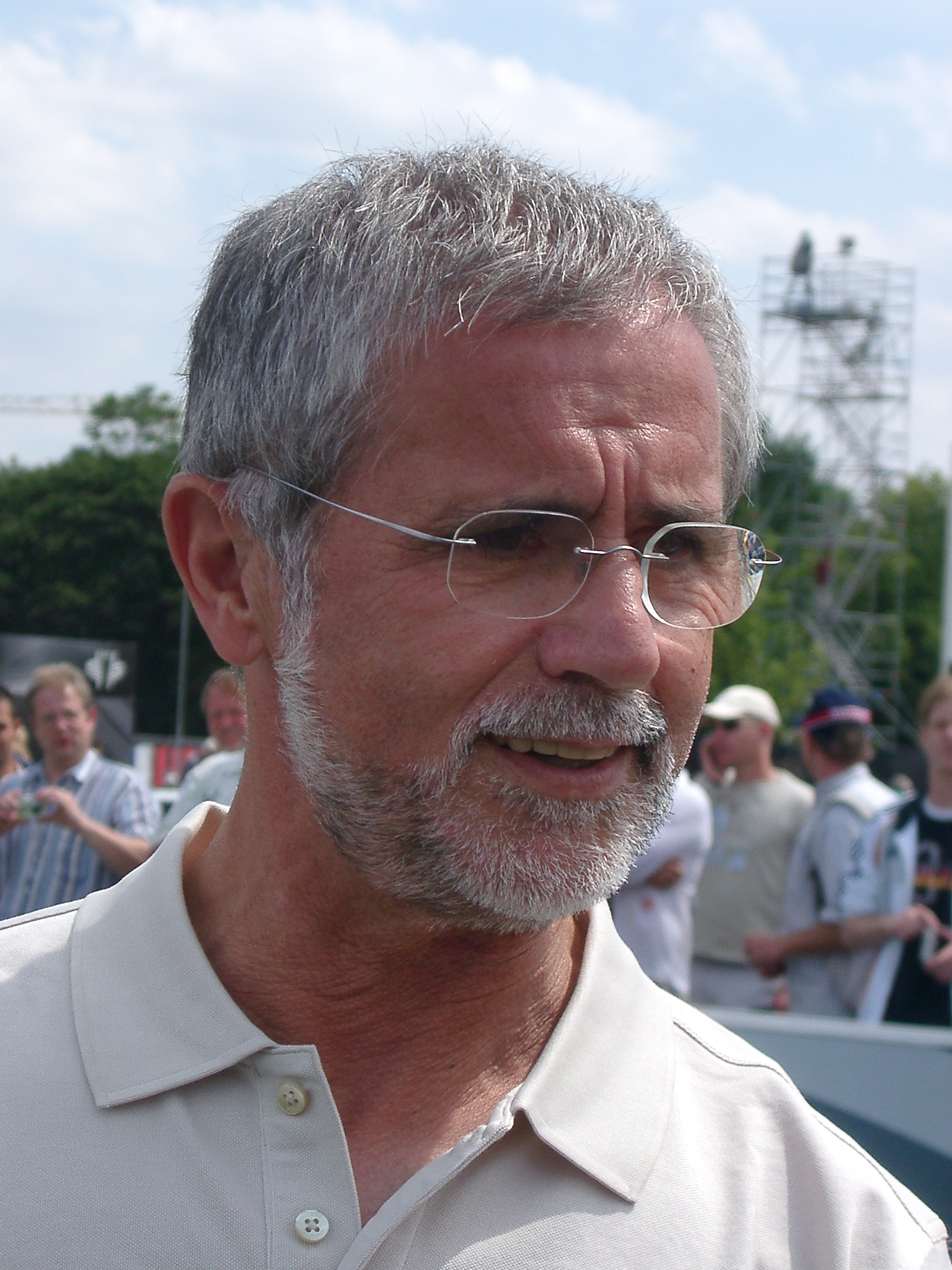
Müller in 2006

After Müller ended his career in 1981, he fell into a slump and suffered from alcoholism. However, his former companions at Bayern Munich convinced him to go through alcohol rehabilitation. When he emerged, they gave him a job as a coach at Bayern Munich II.

He held the position from 1992 until he retired in 2014 due to health problems. There is also a collection of apparel released by sporting giants Adidas under the Gerd Müller name. It is part of the Adidas originals series. In July 2008, the Rieser Sportpark, in Nördlingen, where Müller had begun his career, was renamed the Gerd-Müller-Stadion in his honour.

On 6 October 2015, it was announced that Müller was suffering from Alzheimer's disease. He died on 15 August 2021 in a nursing home in Wolfratshausen, Bavaria, aged 75.

== Player profile ==
=== Style of play ===
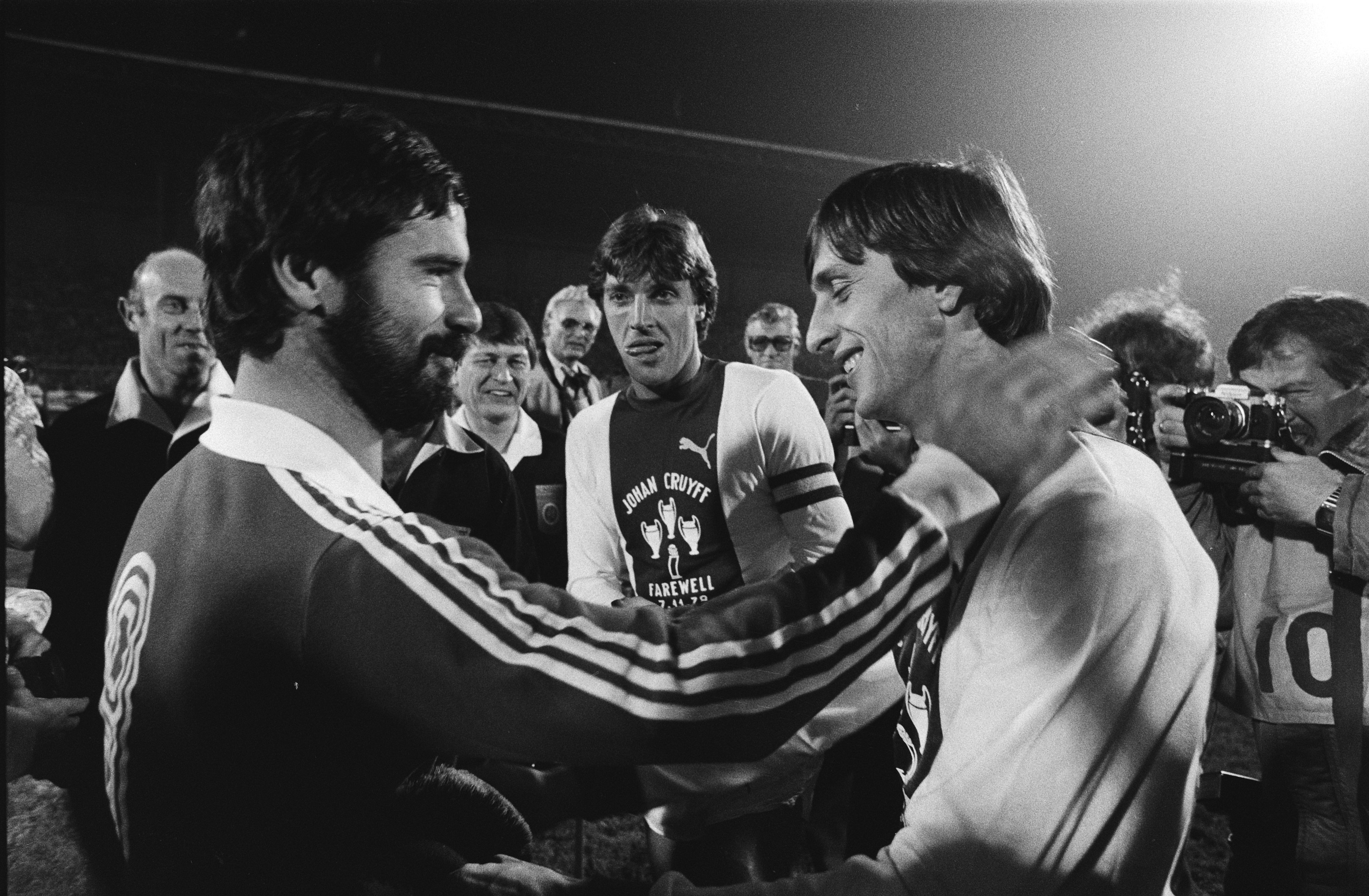
Müller, Ruud Krol and Johan Cruyff in 1978

In his book, Brilliant Orange: The Neurotic Genius of Dutch Football, author David Winner writes, "Müller was short, squat, awkward-looking and not notably fast; he never fitted the conventional idea of a great footballer, but he had lethal acceleration over short distances, a remarkable aerial game, and uncanny goalscoring instincts. His short legs gave him a low center of gravity, so he could turn quickly and with perfect balance in spaces and at speeds that would cause other players to fall over. He also had a knack of scoring in unlikely situations."

Müller used extreme acceleration, agility, and deceptive changes of pace to get to loose balls first, and bypass defenders. His teammate Franz Beckenbauer has emphasized Müller's unusual speed: "His pace was incredible. In training I have played against him and I never had a chance."

A prolific goalscorer, Müller was also known for his movement, coordination, intelligence, and clinical finishing inside the penalty area. He had the ability to score goals from awkward positions with almost any part of his body, not only with his head or foot.

=== Legacy ===
Müller is widely considered to be one of the greatest strikers and goalscorers in the history of football. He is seen as the greatest "goal poacher" in history, with Gary Lineker calling him "the ultimate goal poacher". Müller is one of only two players, alongside Lionel Messi, to have won the FIFA World Cup, the UEFA Champions League, the Ballon d'Or and the European Golden Shoe. After his death in 2021, FC Bayern Munich president Herbert Hainer declared that Müller was "the greatest striker there's ever been", while Franz Beckenbauer stated that Müller was "the most important player in the history of Bayern Munich".

== Career statistics ==
=== Club ===
Appearances and goals by club, season and competition
Club	Season	League			DFB-Pokal		Continental		Other		Total	
Club	Season	Division	Apps	Goals	Apps	Goals	Apps	Goals	Apps	Goals	Apps	Goals
TSV 1861 Nördlingen	1962–63	2. Amateurliga Schwaben	3	4	—		—		—		3	4
TSV 1861 Nördlingen	1963–64	Bezirksliga Schwaben	28	47	—		—		—		28	47
TSV 1861 Nördlingen	Total		31	51	—		—		—		31	51
Bayern Munich	1964–65	Regionalliga Süd	26	33	—		—		8 (Note: Six appearances and six goals in Bundesliga promotion play-offs, two appearances and two goals in South German Cup)	8	34	41
Bayern Munich	1965–66	Bundesliga	33	15	6	1	—		—		39	16
Bayern Munich	1966–67	Bundesliga	32	28	4	7	9 (Note: Appearances in European Cup Winners' Cup)	8	—		45	43
Bayern Munich	1967–68	Bundesliga	34	19	4	4	8	7	—		46	30
Bayern Munich	1968–69	Bundesliga	30	30	5	7	—		—		35	37
Bayern Munich	1969–70	Bundesliga	33	38	3	4	2 (Note: Appearances in European Cup)	0	—		38	42
Bayern Munich	1970–71	Bundesliga	32	22	7	10	8 (Note: Appearances in Inter-Cities Fairs Cup)	7	—		47	39
Bayern Munich	1971–72	Bundesliga	34	40	6	5	8	5	—		48	50
Bayern Munich	1972–73	Bundesliga	33	36	5	7	6	11	5 (Note: Appearances in DFB-Ligapokal)	12	49	66
Bayern Munich	1973–74	Bundesliga	34	30	4	5	10	8	—		48	43
Bayern Munich	1974–75	Bundesliga	33	23	3	2	7	5	—		43	30
Bayern Munich	1975–76	Bundesliga	22	23	6	7	6	5	1 (Note: Appearance in UEFA Super Cup)	0	35	35
Bayern Munich	1976–77	Bundesliga	25	28	4	11	4	5	4 (Note: Two appearances and three goals in UEFA Super Cup, two appearances and one goal in Intercontinental Cup)	4	37	48
Bayern Munich	1977–78	Bundesliga	33	24	3	4	6 (Note: Appearances in UEFA Cup)	4	—		42	32
Bayern Munich	1978–79	Bundesliga	19	9	2	4	—		—		21	13
Bayern Munich	Total		453	398	62	78	74	65	18	24	607	565
Fort Lauderdale Strikers	1979	NASL	25	19	—		—		2 (Note: Appearances in NASL play-offs)	0	27	19
Fort Lauderdale Strikers	1980	NASL	29	14	—		—		7	2	36	16
Fort Lauderdale Strikers	1981	NASL	17	5	—		—		—		17	5
Fort Lauderdale Strikers	Total		71	38	—		—		9	2	80	40
Career total			555	487	62	78	74	65	27	26	718	656

=== International ===
Appearances and goals by national team and year
National team	Year	Apps	Goals
West Germany	Friendlies – 1966	1	0
West Germany	Friendlies – 1967	1	1
West Germany	UEFA Euro 1968 qual.	3	6
West Germany	Friendlies – 1968	1	0
West Germany	1970 FIFA World Cup qual.	6	9
West Germany	Friendlies – 1969	3	2
West Germany	Friendlies – 1970	5	2
West Germany	1970 FIFA World Cup	6	10
West Germany	Friendlies – 1971	4	7
West Germany	UEFA Euro 1972 qual.	7	6
West Germany	Friendlies – 1972	3	8
West Germany	UEFA Euro 1972	2	4
West Germany	Friendlies – 1973	8	7
West Germany	Friendlies – 1974	5	2
West Germany	1974 FIFA World Cup	7	4
Total		62	68

Müller scored 68 goals in 62 games for West Germany. His 14 goals in FIFA World Cup tournaments were a record between 1974 and 2006. This score was bettered in 2006 by Brazil's Ronaldo, and eight years later by German Miroslav Klose who achieved a total of 16 World Cup goals, and who also broke Müller's record for goals for Germany with 71 goals in 137 matches. However, Müller managed to score eight hat-tricks in his international career.

== Honours ==
Bayern Munich

- Regionalliga Süd: 1964–65
- Bundesliga: 1968–69, 1971–72, 1972–73, 1973–74
- DFB-Pokal: 1965–66, 1966–67, 1968–69, 1970–71
- European Cup: 1973–74, 1974–75, 1975–76
- European Cup Winners' Cup: 1966–67
- Intercontinental Cup: 1976

West Germany

- FIFA World Cup: 1974
- UEFA European Championship: 1972

Individual

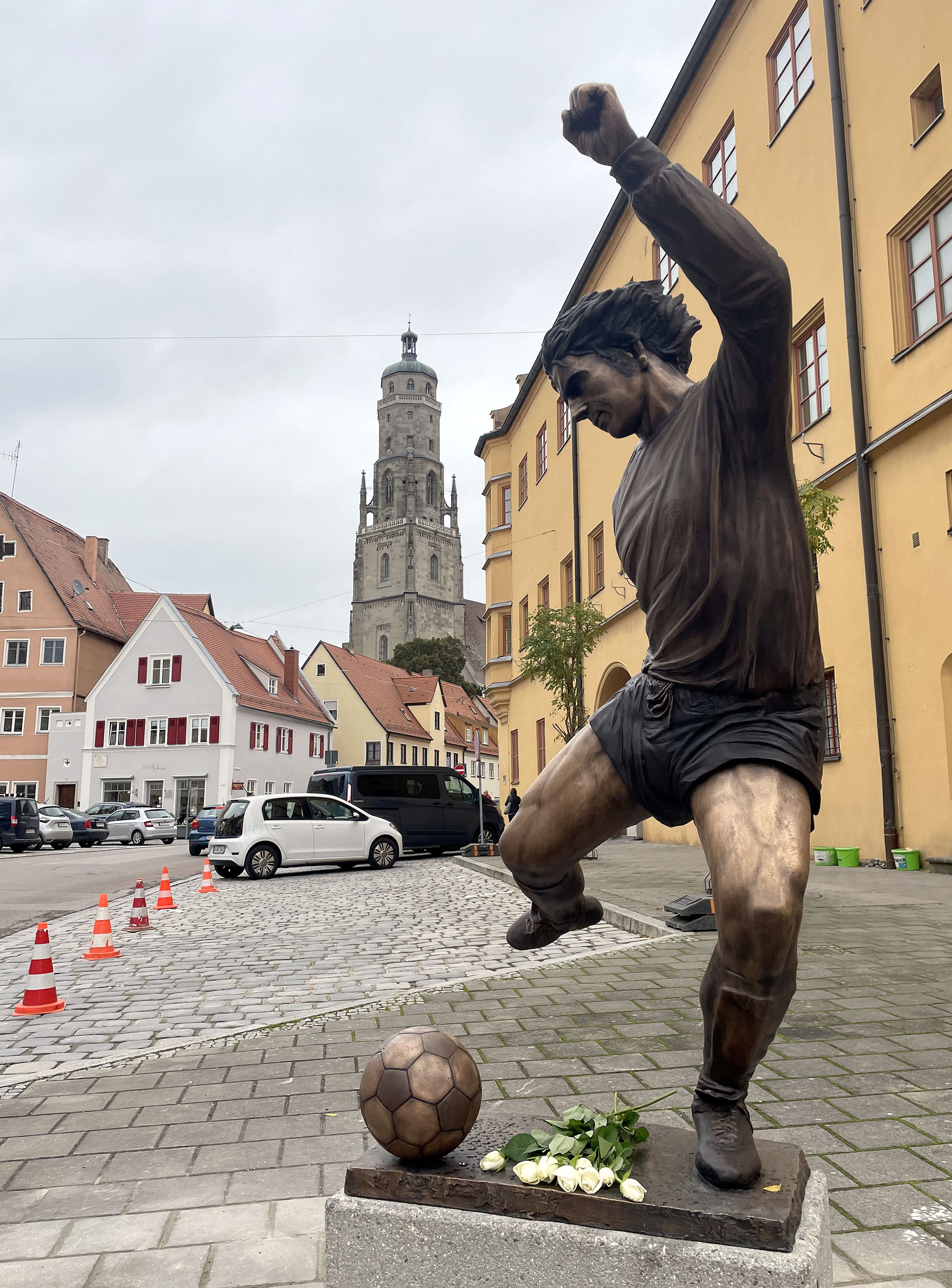
Statue of Gerd Müller in his hometown of Nördlingen

- Ballon d'Or: 1970; runner-up: 1972; (Note: Shared with Günter Netzer) third place: 1969, 1973
- Footballer of the Year (Germany): 1967, 1969
- Voted best Player 40 Years Bundesliga 1963–2003
- kicker Bundesliga Team of the Season: 1968–69, 1969–70, 1971–72, 1972–73
- Eric Batty's World XI: 1969, 1971, 1972, 1973, 1974, 1976, 1977, 1978
- FUWO European Team of the Season: 1970, 1972
- Sport Ideal European XI: 1971, 1972, 1973, 1974
- Bundesliga Top Scorer (Kicker-Torjägerkanone): 1967, 1969, 1970, 1972, 1973, 1974, 1978
- European Golden Shoe: 1969–70, 1971–72
- FIFA World Cup Golden Boot: 1970
- FIFA World Cup All-Star Team: 1970
- FIFA Selects World XI: 1971, 1972, 1973
- Worldwide Topscorer: 1970, 1972
- UEFA European Championship Top Scorer: 1972
- UEFA European Championship Team of the Tournament: 1972
- European Cup Top Scorer: 1973, 1974, 1975, 1977
- Onze de Onze: 1976
- FIFA Order of Merit: 1998
- France Football's Football Player of the Century: 10th (1999)
- World Soccer The Greatest Players of the 20th century: 15th (1999)
- FIFA 100: 2004
- Golden Foot: 2007, as football legend
- Bravo Otto: Gold award: 1973, 1974; Silver award: 1975; Bronze award: 1972, 1976
- IFFHS Legends
- Bayern Munich All-time XI
- IFFHS All-time Men's B Dream Team: 2021
- IFFHS All-time Europe Men's Dream Team: 2021

== See also ==
- List of men's footballers with 500 or more goals
- List of men's footballers with 50 or more international goals
- List of footballers who achieved hat-trick records
