= 2011–12 FC Barcelona season =

113th season in existence of FC Barcelona

Barcelona
2011–12 season
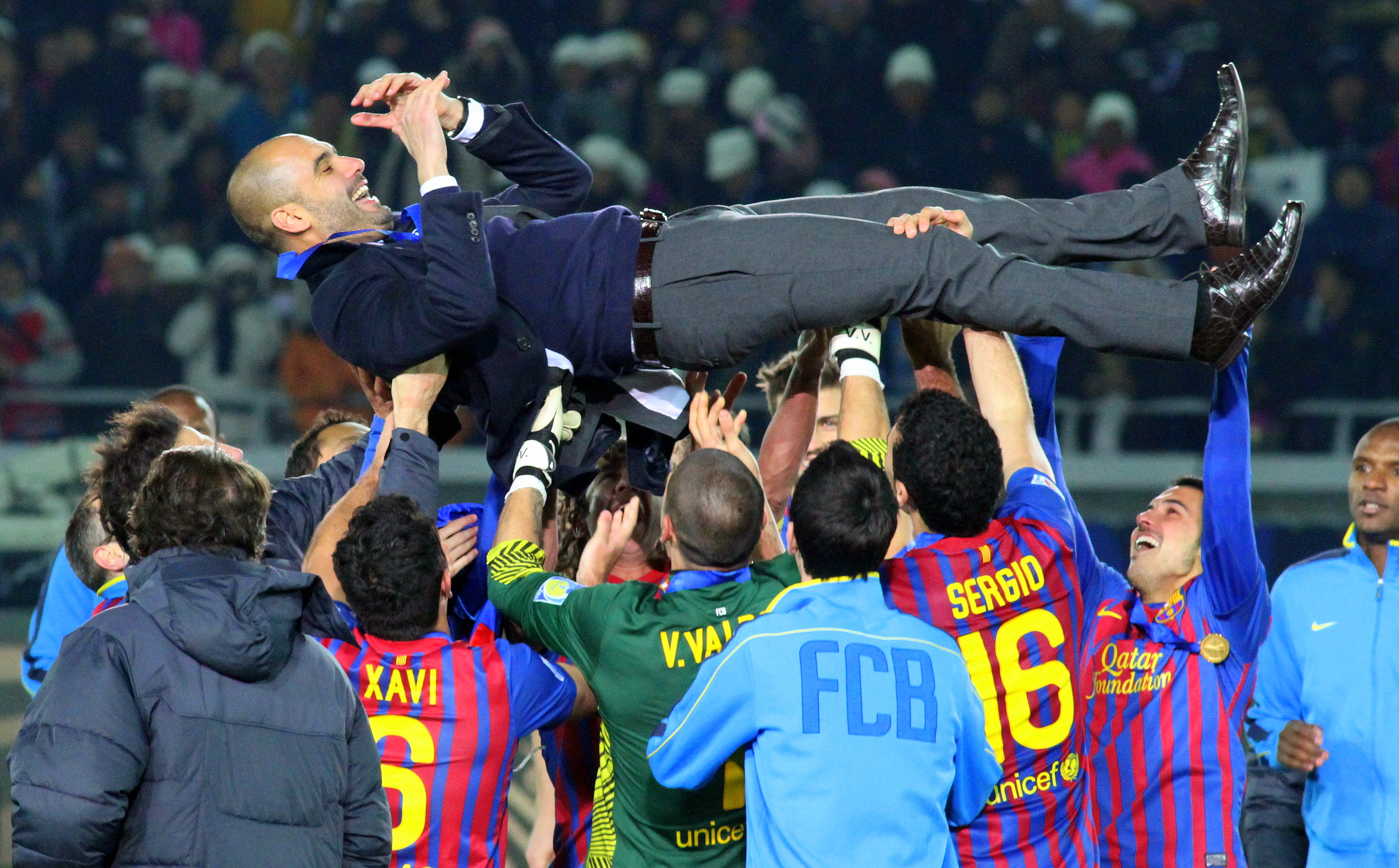
- FC Barcelona players celebrating their FIFA Club World Cup victory
- President: Sandro Rosell
- Head coach: Pep Guardiola
- Stadium: Camp Nou
- La Liga: 2nd
- Copa del Rey: Winners
- Supercopa de España: Winners
- UEFA Champions League: Semi-finals
- UEFA Super Cup: Winners
- FIFA Club World Cup: Winners
- Top goalscorer: League: Lionel Messi (50); All: Lionel Messi (73)
- Highest home attendance: 99,252 vs Real Madrid (21 April 2012)
- Lowest home attendance: 37,374 vs BATE Borisov (6 December 2011)
- Average home league attendance: 75,212 (including Joan Gamper Trophy)
Home colours	Away colours	Third colours

The 2011–12 season was FC Barcelona's 113th in existence and the club's 81st consecutive season in the top flight of Spanish football. Barcelona debuted their new and first paid shirt sponsor Qatar Foundation after an agreement was reached in 2010 with the non-profit organization for a five-and-a-half-year, €170 million deal. The agreement with UNICEF continued and their name had been moved to the lower back portion of the shirt. This season also introduced a new away kit in black while the third kit was retained from last season.

Barcelona were unable to defend two major trophies: they finished as runners-up in Liga, nine points behind winners Real Madrid, who finished with a record 100 points, and their UEFA Champions League campaign ended after a 3–2 aggregate defeat in the semi-finals to eventual winners Chelsea. Pep Guardiola stepped down as head coach at the conclusion of the season, which ended on a high as Barcelona beat Athletic Bilbao 3–0 in the Copa del Rey final at the Vicente Calderón.

Barcelona's under-19 squad played in the inaugural tournament of the NextGen series. After finishing first in their group during the group stage, they were eliminated by Ajax in the quarter-finals of the tournament.

== Season overview ==
=== May/June ===
On 31 May, Sevilla confirmed it had exercised its right to purchase defender Martín Cáceres, who spent the 2010–11 season on loan with the club from Barcelona. Barcelona received €4.10 million in compensation after making the loan permanent.

=== July ===
On 2 July, Barcelona parted ways with midfielder Víctor Sánchez after both parties agreed to rescind the player's contract. Sánchez made 14 appearances with the first team in the 2007–2008 and 2008–2009 seasons. He was loaned to Xerez for the 2009–10 season and at Getafe for the 2010–11 season.

On 4 July, defender Andreu Fontàs was promoted to the first team after spending the previous season filling in for an injured Eric Abidal, who had been diagnosed with a liver tumour.

On 21 July, Barcelona completed the transfer of Chilean winger Alexis Sánchez from Italian club Udinese. The deal is for five years and the cost of the transfer is €26 million with variable cost of €11.5 million.

On 22 July, Barcelona transferred La Masia graduate Bojan to Italian outfit Roma for €10 million and the agreement includes an obligatory re-purchase clause to be exercised by Barcelona at the end of the 2012–13 season, for a cost of €13 million. Roma may override this re-purchase at this time by paying the club an additional €28 million.

=== August ===
On 3 August, Portuguese club Sporting CP made official the signing of another Barcelona's La Masia graduate, winger Jeffrén, on a five-year deal. The transfer deal was worth €3.7 million and includes a €30 million buyout clause.

On 4 August, Barcelona and Argentine centre-back Gabriel Milito reached an agreement to terminate his contract after four years with the team. He then signed with Argentine club Independiente.

On 14 August, both Barcelona and English club Arsenal announced on their respective official websites an agreement for the transfer of Spanish international midfielder Cesc Fàbregas. The deal will cost Barcelona €29 million with €11 million in variables and end one of the longest transfer sagas in football. On the same day, Barcelona and Real Madrid kicked off the 2011–12 season with a 2–2 draw at the Santiago Bernabéu in the first leg of the 2011 Supercopa de España in front of a full house.

On 17 August, Barcelona won the Supercopa de España with a thrilling 3–2 win and a 5–4 aggregate over rivals Real Madrid. The match ended with several sending offs for a brawl started after Barcelona players deemed a tackle by Marcelo on Cesc Fàbregas to be dangerous play. David Villa, Mesut Özil and Marcelo all received their marching orders after calm was restored. Real Madrid manager José Mourinho and Barça's assistant Tito Vilanova were also involved in a small physical altercation. Goals from Andrés Iniesta and a brace, including the game winner, by Lionel Messi assured Barça started their season with a trophy by claiming their tenth Supercopa all time.

On 19 August, the Association of Spanish Footballers (AFE) went on strike due to unpaid wages for players in the top two divisions of Spanish football by clubs who have gone into financial administration. The AFE and Liga de Fútbol Profesional (LFP) have yet to agree on a guaranteed fund to protect players' wages in the event of their clubs being declared insolvent. The strike forced Spanish league games scheduled for the weekend of 20 and 21 August, including Barcelona's season opener against Málaga, to be postponed.

On 25 August, Lionel Messi was voted the winner of the inaugural UEFA Best Player in Europe Award for the 2010–11 season over teammate Xavi and Real Madrid's Cristiano Ronaldo.

On 26 August, Barcelona won the UEFA Super Cup with a 2–0 victory over Portuguese outfit Porto in Monaco. The victory gave Barça their fourth UEFA Super Cup trophy all time and saw Fàbregas score his first goal with a Barcelona shirt in the 88th minute.

=== September ===
On 10 September, back from the FIFA international break, Barcelona could only draw 2–2 with Real Sociedad at Anoeta. Barça also lost Alexis Sánchez for approximately 6–8 weeks after the player tore his hamstring in his right leg after a tackle by Sociedad's Dani Estrada.

On 13 September, Barcelona opened their UEFA Champions League campaign with a 2–2 draw against Milan at the Camp Nou. Midfielder Andrés Iniesta left in the 38th minute with a tore femoral biceps on his left leg and will miss approximately a month.

On 17 September, after two consecutive draws Barcelona trashed Osasuna 8–0 at Camp Nou. Lionel Messi scored a hat-trick and lead Barça to their biggest win of the season. Osasuna coach José Luis Mendilibar stated, "we've caught them very angry due to their so-called mini-crisis," while Barça's coach Pep Guardiola stated in regards to the mini-crisis, "the day I see them not running, that their bellies are full, I'll sit here to tell you all [media]. When we play bad, believe me I'll come here and tell you all. But I did not have that sensation."

On 28 September, Barcelona defeated BATE Borisov 0–5 at the Dynama Stadium in their first meeting in Group H of the Champions League. Lionel Messi scored a brace and tied László Kubala for 2nd place on the all-time goals scoring list for Barcelona with 194 goals.

=== October ===
On 2 October, Barcelona defeated Sporting de Gijón 0–1 at El Molinón to take over first place in La Liga's standings for the first time this season. A lone goal by Adriano was enough to see the team go top by goal difference over Levante.

On 19 October, Barcelona notched its second Champions League victory of the season by defeating Czech side Viktoria Plzeň 2–0 at the Camp Nou.

On 22 October, Barça were held scoreless for the first time in the young season by a heroic performance from Sevilla goalkeeper Javi Varas. The match ended with a scoreless draw after Lionel Messi's penalty kick was saved by Varas in injury time. The match towards the end was marred by a small brawl between Frédéric Kanouté and Cesc Fàbregas as the latter took offense to Kanouté kicking the ball from the penalty spot after Messi had placed it to take the spot kick. After the match, Fàbregas was accused of racially abusing Kanouté, which the player vehemently denied and at the end both players apologized over the incident by telephone.

On 25 October, Barcelona traveled to Los Cármenes to take on Granada where they escaped with a 0–1 victory after a 33rd-minute goal from a free-kick by Xavi. Barça also lost forward Pedro for approximately three weeks due to strained tendons in his left ankle.

=== November ===
On 1 November, the 23-men shortlist for the 2011 FIFA Ballon d'Or was released with eight Barcelona—Eric Abidal, Dani Alves, Cesc Fàbregas, Andrés Iniesta, Lionel Messi, Gerard Piqué, David Villa and Xavi. Later that night, Barcelona defeated Viktoria Plzeň 0–4 in Prague at the Synot Tip Arena with a hat-trick by Messi and assured their progress into the knock-out stage. With the three goals, he surpassed the 200-goal mark as a Barcelona player in Pep Guardiola's 200th game as first team manager. Goalkeeper Víctor Valdés broke the team record for most minutes without conceding a goal at 877 consecutive minutes. He surpasses Miguel Reina record of 824 minutes set in the 1972–73 season.

On 9 November, the first leg of the Round of 16 of the Copa del Rey was moved up due to Barcelona's involvement in the 2011 FIFA Club World Cup in December. Barça won the match 0–1 with a strike outside the area by Andrés Iniesta in the 42nd minute.

On 22 November, assistant coach Tito Vilanova was successfully operated for problem in his parotid gland. The club did not release anymore information on the matter due to the coach's wish to have everything remain private. The next day, Barcelona defeated Milan at the San Siro 2–3 in a thrilling European encounter to win Group H.

On 26 November, Barça lost its first official match of the season with a 1–0 defeat at Getafe with a goal by Juan Valera in the 67th minute. The defeat leaves Barcelona 6 points behind Real Madrid with 2 matches to go for the first el Clásico of the season.

=== December ===
On 10 December, the first Clásico of the season was contested at the Bernabéu with Barça securing a 1–3 victory over their great rivals. Real Madrid's forward Karim Benzema scored the fastest goal in Clásico history after getting one past goalkeeper Víctor Valdés off two deflections 24 seconds into the match. Within 30 minutes, Barça equalized with a strike from Alexis followed by a goal by Fàbregas, making it three years running that their big summer transfers score in the first Clásico of the season.

On 15 December, David Villa fractured his tibia while attempting to score in Barça's 0–4 FIFA Club World Cup semi-final victory over Qatari club Al-Sadd. The injury will sideline the player for four-to-six months, possibly causing him to miss UEFA Euro 2012.

On 18 December, Barcelona claimed the Club World Cup with a 0–4 victory over Brazilian club Santos in Japan. A brace from Lionel Messi and strikes from Xavi and Fabregas gave Barça their fifth title in 2011 and their second title in this competition.

On 22 December, Barcelona defeated L'Hospitalet in the second leg of the Copa del Rey 9–0 (10–0 aggregate). Strikes from Pedro, Iniesta, Xavi, Thiago, Cristian Tello and Isaac Cuenca sealed what was another superb display of talent and command on the pitch by the Catalans. The latter three scored a brace each and the win helped the team proceed to the next round of the competition where they face Osasuna at Camp Nou in a first leg Round of 16 tie.

=== January ===
On 4 January, Barça started off the year with a 4–0 victory over Osasuna in their Round of 16 tie at the Camp Nou. Lionel Messi came off the bench to score two goals in the last 20 minutes after he was left off the team sheet earlier in the day due to the flu.

On 8 January, the derbi barceloní ended in a 1–1 draw with goals by Cesc Fàbregas (16th minute) for Barcelona and Álvaro Vázquez (86th minute) for Espanyol. Barcelona right back Dani Alves was racially abused by the Espanyol fans throughout the match and prompted the Espanyol coach Mauricio Pochettino to "condemn the actions of his fans."

On 9 January, Lionel Messi was awarded the 2011 FIFA Ballon d'Or and Pep Guardiola received the FIFA Coach of the Year award in Zürich. With the award, Messi wins his third consecutive Ballon d'Or, joining Michel Platini, Marco van Basten and Johan Cruyff as the only three-time winners, and the first since Platini to win it three consecutive years.

On 11 January, Barça and French club Paris Saint-Germain agreed to the transfer of Brazilian left back Maxwell for €4 million.

On 12 January, Barcelona defeated Osasuna 1–2 at the Reyno de Navarra to move on to the Copa del Rey quarter-finals where they'll meet Real Madrid for another round of Clásicos. CB Andreus Fontàs will miss the rest of the year when he suffered a torn ACL in the 14th minute of play. Pedro will also be sidelined for ten days due to a minor hamstring injury.

On 15 January, Barcelona defeated Real Betis 4–2 to remain five points back in second place in La Liga table. With the victory, Pep Guardiola notched his 100th win in the Primera División, only needing 132 matches to accomplish the feat.

On 18 January, Barça defeated Real Madrid at the Bernabéu in consecutive months, by a 1–2 scoreline. Goals by defenders Carles Puyol and Eric Abidal secured the comeback victory in the first leg. The match did not end without some controversy as Real Madrid's defender Pepe seemed to have stepped on Lionel Messi's hand while the latter was sitting on the ground. The player escaped without sanction from the referee even though the action was viewed by every camera angle at the stadium.

On 22 January, the postponed Week 1 match against Málaga due to the player's strike was played at La Rosadela with Barça taking a 1–4 victory. A Lionel Messi hat-trick provided all three points for Barcelona to keep pace on Real Madrid for the title.

On 25 January, Barcelona eliminated Real Madrid from the Copa del Rey with a 2–2 draw at Camp Nou to win the tie 4–3 on aggregate and reached their 50th semi-final all time in the competition.

On 29 January, Barça were held to a scoreless draw by Villarreal at the El Madrigal to put them seven points behind league leaders Real Madrid. Two days later, Isaac Cuenca extended his contract until 30 June 2015 and was officially promoted to the first-team.

=== February ===
On 8 February, Barcelona defeated Valencia 2–0 at Camp Nou and 3–1 on aggregate to advance to their 34th Copa del Rey final. Goals from Cesc Fàbregas and Xavi to set up a rematch of the 2009 final against Athletic Bilbao.

On 11 February, Barcelona suffered their second loss of the season, 3–2 to Osasuna in Pamplona. With the loss, the team continued to show their struggles in the league away from the Camp Nou, dropping ten points behind leaders Real Madrid.

On 14 February, Barcelona defeated Bayer Leverkusen at the BayArena with a 3–1 win in their Champions League first leg encounter to move closer to qualifying for the quarter-finals. Alexis Sánchez scored his first two goals in the Champions League in first start.

On 19 February, Barcelona notched their 15th win in La Liga against Valencia with a 5–1 scoreline at Camp Nou to keep pace with Real Madrid. Lionel Messi celebrated his 200th match in La Liga by scoring four goals.

On 26 February, Barcelona defeated Atlético Madrid with a 1–2 scoreline at the Vicente Calderón. Lionel Messi was booked in the eighth minute for a handball and will miss his first match in his career due to cards accumulation.

=== March ===
On 3 March, Barcelona defeated Sporting Gijón with a 3–1 score despite playing with ten men for more than half-an-hour after Gerard Piqué was sent off for throwing his boot at the Sporting de Gijón kit man at the start of the second half.

On 7 March, Barcelona defeated Bayer Leverkusen 7–1 with Lionel Messi becoming the first player to score five goals in a match in the Champions League era. Cristian Tello made a great debut in the competition by scoring his first two goals to complete the Barça rout.

On 11 March, Barcelona defeated Racing de Santander 0–2 in Cantabria to notch their 18th win in La Liga. The goals were scored by Lionel Messi to take his season total to 50 goals with more than two months left in the season.

On 15 March, Barcelona announced that defender Eric Abidal will have "a liver transplant as a result of the progress of his liver disease" and will miss the rest of the season. No further information was made available "at the express wish of the player, the club requested the utmost respect for the right to privacy and confidentiality".

On 17 March, Barcelona defeated Sevilla 0–2 at the Ramón Sánchez Pizjuán. The first goal was scored off a stunning freekick by Xavi in the 17th minute and the second by Messi in the 24th minute after a great display of team passing.

On 20 March, Barcelona beat Granada 5–3 at Camp Nou behind a historic hat-trick by Lionel Messi. Messi took his career tally to 234 goals as a Barcelona player and surpassed César as the all-time top scorer for the club in competitive matches.

On 28 March, Barcelona and Milan finished 0–0 at San Siro in their first leg quarter-finals encounter in the Champions League. The next day, Barça filed a complaint with UEFA over the state of the pitch after both clubs agreed it would be in suitable conditions to play. Guardiola said, "it is bad for the spectacle, but to be champions we must overcome all adversities. We have done this many times, although people say otherwise."

=== April ===
On 3 April, Barcelona advanced to its fifth consecutive Champions League semi-finals with a 3–1 victory (3–1 on aggregate) over Milan. Lionel Messi scored two penalties to take his season tally to 14 goals and set a new record in the Champions League era.

On 4 April, Barcelona announced that Barcelona B defender Marc Muniesa signed an extension to his contract and will be promoted to the first team for the 2012–13 season.

On 10 April, Barcelona defeated Getafe 4–0 at Camp Nou to sleep one point behind league leaders Real Madrid. The victory was dedicated to defender Eric Abidal who underwent a liver transplant, from players and coaches at the post-game press conference.

On 14 April, Barcelona came back to defeat Levante 1–2 at the Ciutat de València. Lionel Messi lead with a brace and took his tally to 41 goals in the league, that left him tied with Real Madrid's Cristiano Ronaldo for the league lead. They also surpassed the record of 40 goals in a season set by Cristiano Ronaldo last season.

On 18 April, Barcelona lost its first match in this season's Champions League, 1–0 to Chelsea at Stamford Bridge in London. Even though they dominated every aspect of the match, they were defeated at the stroke of half-time by the lone goal scored by Didier Drogba.

On 21 April, Barcelona lost their second game in row after being defeated at Camp Nou by fierce rival Real Madrid with a scoreline of 1–2 in El Clásico. Sami Khedira, Alexis Sánchez and Cristiano Ronaldo provided the goals.

On 24 April, Barcelona drew 2–2 with Chelsea in the 2nd leg semi-final of the Champions League at the Camp Nou. Sergio Busquets and Andrés Iniesta put Barcelona up 2–0 by the 44th minute as the Spanish club again dominated possession from the start, owning 73% for the game. In between those goals, Chelsea captain John Terry was given a straight red card for putting his knee into the back of Alexis Sánchez, as Barcelona seemed well on its way to reach a third final in four years making a Chelsea fightback look even more unlikely. But Ramires lobbed a shot right before half-time giving the advantage back to his team on aggregate, and the Spanish giants never found a way to recover after the break. After Lionel Messi blasted a penalty off the crossbar in the 59th minute and came close once again with another, Chelsea goalkeeper Petr Čech making a diving effort to slightly alter the ball's path to the post. Substitute Fernando Torres dribbled round Víctor Valdés to score in added time to make it 2–3 on aggregate and sealed Barcelona's elimination from Europe.

On 27 April, manager Pep Guardiola announced he would step down as coach at the end of the season. His record of 13 trophies in four seasons has made him the most successful coach in Barcelona's history. At the press conference in which Barcelona confirmed Guardiola's exit, the team also announced that he would be succeeded by current assistant Tito Vilanova. Vilanova will begin leading the first team at the start of the 2012–13 season.

=== May ===
On 2 May, Barcelona defeated Málaga 4–1 at the Camp Nou. Lionel Messi scored a hat-trick and took his season tally to 68 goals in all competitions, passing Gerd Müller's record of 67 goals in the 1972–73 season.

On 5 May, Barcelona took the second leg of the derbi barceloní with a 4–0 victory over Espanyol. Lionel Messi scored four times and became the first player in La Liga to score 50 goals in a season. It was also an emotional farewell match for Guardiola in his last home game as Barça's manager.

On 12 May, Barcelona drew their last league game of the season at the Benito Villamarín 2–2 against Real Betis. Barça finished 9 points off the league winner Real Madrid while Lionel Messi finished with 50 league goals to win the Pichichi Trophy and European Golden Boot as the league's top scorer and Víctor Valdés claimed the Zamora Trophy.

On 25 May, Barcelona claimed its 26th Copa del Rey with a 0–3 victory over Athletic Bilbao at the Vicente Calderón in Madrid. Pedro scored twice while Messi added the third in the seventh final contested between the two teams.

== Players ==
=== Squad information ===
N	Pos.	Nat.	Name	Age	EU	Since	App	Goals	Ends	Transfer fee	Notes
1	GK	(Spain)	Víctor Valdés (2nd VC)	30	EU	2002	457	0	2014	Youth system	
2	RB	(Brazil)	Dani Alves	29	EU	2008	208	15	2015	€32M	Second nationality: Spain
3	CB	(Spain)	Gerard Piqué	25	EU	2008	183	13	2015	€5M	Originally from youth system
4	CM	(Spain)	Cesc Fàbregas	25	EU	2011	49	15	2016	€29M	Originally from youth system
5	CB	(Spain)	Carles Puyol (captain)	34	EU	1999	559	14	2013	Youth system	
6	CM	(Spain)	Xavi (vice-captain)	32	EU	1998	629	73	2016	Youth system	
7	ST	(Spain)	David Villa	30	EU	2010	76	32	2015	€40M	
8	LW	(Spain)	Andrés Iniesta (3rd VC)	28	EU	2002	408	41	2015	Youth system	
9	RW	(Chile)	Alexis Sánchez	23	Non-EU	2011	41	15	2016	€26M	
10	FW	(Argentina)	Messi	24	EU	2004	268	179	2016	Youth system	Second nationality: Spain
11	CM	(Spain)	Thiago	21	EU	2009	65	8	2015	Youth system	Second nationality: Brazil
13	GK	(Spain)	José Manuel Pinto	36	EU	2008	48	0	2013	€0.5M	
14	CB	(Argentina)	Javier Mascherano	27	EU	2010	97	0	2014	€19M	Second nationality: Italy
15	CM	(Mali)	Seydou Keita	32	EU	2008	188	22	2014	€14M	Second nationality: France
16	DM	(Spain)	Sergio Busquets	23	EU	2008	191	7	2015	Youth system	
17	FW	(Spain)	Pedro	24	EU	2008	169	58	2016	Youth system	
20	AM	(Netherlands)	Ibrahim Afellay	26	EU	2011	34	2	2015	€3M	Second nationality: Morocco
21	LB	(Brazil)	Adriano	27	EU	2010	71	4	2014	€9.5M	Second nationality: Spain
22	LB	(France)	Eric Abidal	32	EU	2007	188	2	2013	€9M	
23	ST	(Spain)	Isaac Cuenca	21	EU	2012	30	4	2015	Youth system	
24	CB	(Spain)	Andreu Fontàs	22	EU	2009	16	1	2015	Youth system	

- Last updated: 25 May 2012
- Source: FCBarcelona.cat, Players in / out, Wikipedia players' articles, ESPN (for appearances and goals) and footballdatabase.com (for EU passport)

Total squad cost: €187.5M

=== From the youth system ===
Updated 13 August 2011

Note: Flags indicate national team as defined under FIFA eligibility rules; some limited exceptions apply. Players may hold more than one non-FIFA nationality.

No.	Pos.	Nation	Player
26	DF	ESP	Marc Muniesa
27	FW	ESP	Gerard Deulofeu
28	MF	MEX	Jonathan dos Santos
29	MF	ESP	Martí Riverola
30	MF	ESP	Sergi Roberto
31	GK	ESP	Rubén Miño

No.	Pos.	Nation	Player
32	DF	ESP	Marc Bartra
33	DF	ESP	Sergi Gómez
34	MF	BRA	Rafinha
35	DF	ESP	Martín Montoya
36	GK	ESP	Oier
37	FW	ESP	Cristian Tello
38	FW	ESP	Kiko Femenía

=== Transfers in ===
No.	Pos.	Nat.	Name	Age	EU	Moving from	Type	Transfer window	Ends	Transfer fee	Source
4	MF	(Spain)	Cesc Fàbregas	24	EU	Arsenal (England)	Transfer	Summer	2016	€34M	FCBarcelona.cat
9	FW	(Chile)	Alexis Sánchez	22	Non-EU	Udinese (Italy)	Transfer	Summer	2016	€26M + variables	FCBarcelona.cat
	MF	(Belarus)	Alexander Hleb	30	Non-EU	Birmingham (England)	Loan return	Summer	2012		
	MF	(Belarus)	Alexander Hleb	30	Non-EU	VfL Wolfsburg (Germany)	Loan return	Winter	2012		
	DF	(Brazil)	Henrique	24	Non-EU	Racing Santander	Loan return	Summer	2013		
	FW	(Brazil)	Keirrison	22	Non-EU	Santos (Brazil)	Loan return	Summer	2014		
	FW	(Brazil)	Keirrison	23	Non-EU	Cruzeiro (Brazil)	Loan return	Winter	2014		
	MF	(Spain)	Víctor Sánchez	23	EU	Getafe	Loan return	Summer	undisclosed		
	DF	(Uruguay)	Martín Cáceres	24	Non-EU	Sevilla	Loan return	Summer	undisclosed		

Total spending: ▼€60 million

=== Transfers out ===
No.	Pos.	Nat.	Name	Age	EU	Moving to	Type	Transfer window	Transfer fee	Source
—	DF	(Uruguay)	Martín Cáceres	24	Non-EU	Sevilla	Transfer	Summer	€3M	FCBarcelona.cat
—	MF	(Spain)	Víctor Sánchez	23	EU	Neuchâtel Xamax (Switzerland)	Released	Summer	Free	FCBarcelona.cat
—	CB	(Brazil)	Henrique	24	Non-EU	Palmeiras (Brazil)	Loan	Summer	N/A	FCBarcelona.cat
9	FW	(Spain)	Bojan	20	EU	Roma (Italy)	Transfer	Summer	€12M	FCBarcelona.cat
11	FW	(Venezuela)	Jeffrén	23	EU	Sporting CP (Portugal)	Transfer	Summer	€3.75M	FCBarcelona.cat
18	CB	(Argentina)	Gabriel Milito	30	EU	Independiente (Argentina)	Released	Summer	Free	FCBarcelona.cat
—	FW	(Brazil)	Keirrison	22	Non-EU	Cruzeiro (Brazil)	Loan	Summer	N/A	
—	MF	(Belarus)	Alexander Hleb	30	Non-EU	Wolfsburg (Germany)	Loan	Summer	Free	AS.com
19	LWB	(Brazil)	Maxwell	30	EU	Paris Saint-Germain (France)	Transfer	Winter	€4M	FCBarcelona.com
—	MF	(Belarus)	Alexander Hleb	30	Non-EU	Krylia Sovetov Samara (Russia)	Released	Winter	Free	FCBarcelona.cat
—	FW	(Brazil)	Keirrison	23	Non-EU	Coritiba (Brazil)	Loan	Winter	N/A	FCBarcelona.com

Total income: ▲€21.75 million.

Expenditure: ▼€38.25 million

== Club ==
=== Current technical staff ===
Position	Staff
Head coach	Pep Guardiola
Assistant coach	Tito Vilanova
Goalkeeping coach	Juan Carlos Unzué
Physical fitness coach	Lorenzo Buenaventura
Director of football	Andoni Zubizarreta

Last updated: 23 June
Source: FC Barcelona Official Website

== Statistics ==
=== Player statistics ===
				Total				UEFA Champions League		La Liga		Copa del Rey		Others		
N	Pos.	Name	Nat.	GS	App	Gls	Min	App	Gls	App	Gls	App	Gls	App	Gls	Notes
1	GK	Víctor Valdés	(Spain)	51	51		4410	11		35				5		
13	GK	Pinto	(Spain)	13	13		1170	1		3		9				
2	RB	Dani Alves	(Brazil)	46	52	3	4036	10		33	2	5	1	4		Source
3	CB	Gerard Piqué	(Spain)	32	38	2	2712	5		22	2	8		3		
5	CB	Carles Puyol	(Spain)	40	44	5	3292	9		26	3	7	2	2		Source
21	FB	Adriano	(Brazil)	30	40	3	2520	7		26	1	3		4	2	
22	LB	Eric Abidal	(France)	35	38	1	3119	6		22		5	1	5		Source
24	CB	Andreu Fontàs	(Spain)	5	6		369	1		1		3		1		Source
26	CB	Marc Muniesa	(Spain)		3		66	2		1						
32	CB	Marc Bartra	(Spain)	1	2		113	1		1						
35	RB	Martín Montoya	(Spain)	6	10	1	640	1	1	7		2				
4	AM	Cesc Fàbregas	(Spain)	38	48	15	3252	9	1	28	9	8	3	3	2	
6	CM	Xavi	(Spain)	45	51	14	3551	9	1	31	10	7	2	4	1	
8	CM	Andrés Iniesta	(Spain)	39	46	8	3004	8	3	27	2	6	2	5	1	
11	CM	Thiago	(Spain)	32	45	4	2866	7		27	2	8	2	3		
14	DM	Javier Mascherano	(Argentina)	49	52		4403	10		31		6		5		
15	CM	Seydou Keita	(Mali)	22	42	4	2171	9		26	3	3		4	1	
16	DM	Sergio Busquets	(Spain)	46	52	2	3865	10	1	31	1	8		3		
20	AM	Ibrahim Afellay	(Netherlands)	1	5		126	1		4						
28	CM	Jonathan dos Santos	(Mexico)	3	8		313	2		3		3				
29	CM	Martí Riverola	(Spain)		1		11	1								
30	CM	Sergi Roberto	(Spain)	3	4	2	318	1	1	1		2	1			
34	MF	Rafinha	(Brazil)	1	2		85	1				1				
7	SS	David Villa	(Spain)	17	24	9	1556	4	3	15	5	1		4	1	Source
9	SS	Alexis Sánchez	(Chile)	31	41	15	2521	6	2	25	12	7	1	3		
10	SS	Lionel Messi	(Argentina)	57	60	73	5042	11	14	37	50	7	3	5	6	
17	SS	Pedro	(Spain)	32	48	13	2754	9	4	29	5	5	4	5		
23	RW	Isaac Cuenca	(Spain)	20	30	4	1811	7		16	2	6	2	1		
27	FW	Gerard Deulofeu	(Spain)		2		47	1		1						
37	FW	Cristian Tello	(Spain)	5	22	7	575	3	2	15	3	4	2			
–	LB	Maxwell	(Brazil)	6	12	1	666	3		7		1		1	1	

Last updated: 25 May
Source: 2011–12 Stats
Ordered by position in ascending shirt number.
0 shown as blank
^{1} Other Competitions: Supercopa de España, UEFA Super Cup, FIFA Club World Cup

Italic: denotes no longer with club.

=== Disciplinary record ===
Includes all competitive matches. The list is sorted by position, and then shirt number.

N	P	Nat.	Name	La Liga			Champions League			Copa del Rey			Others			Total			Notes
N	P	Nat.	Name	Yellow card	Second yellow card	Red card	Yellow card	Second yellow card	Red card	Yellow card	Second yellow card	Red card	Yellow card	Second yellow card	Red card	Yellow card	Second yellow card	Red card	Notes
1	GK	(Spain)	Víctor Valdés	4									1			5			
13	GK	(Spain)	José Manuel Pinto							1						1			
2	DF	(Brazil)	Dani Alves	7	2		3			1			1			12	2		
3	DF	(Spain)	Gerard Piqué	7		1				1			1			9		1	
5	DF	(Spain)	Carles Puyol	4			2			1						7			
21	DF	(Brazil)	Adriano	2												2			
22	DF	(France)	Eric Abidal	1												1			
24	DF	(Spain)	Andreu Fontàs																
35	DF	(Spain)	Martín Montoya	2												2			
4	MF	(Spain)	Cesc Fàbregas	6						2						8			
6	MF	(Spain)	Xavi	1						1			1			3			
8	MF	(Spain)	Andrés Iniesta	3			1			1			1			6			
11	MF	(Spain)	Thiago	4			1			1						6			
14	MF	(Argentina)	Javier Mascherano	8	1		2			1			1			12	1		
15	MF	(Mali)	Seydou Keita	4			1									5			
16	MF	(Spain)	Sergio Busquets	8			1			1						10			
20	MF	(Netherlands)	Ibrahim Afellay																
28	MF	(Mexico)	Jonathan dos Santos																
30	MF	(Spain)	Sergi Roberto	1												1			
7	FW	(Spain)	David Villa	1			1								1	2		1	
9	FW	(Chile)	Alexis Sánchez	3									1			4			
10	FW	(Argentina)	Lionel Messi	6			2			1						9			
17	FW	(Spain)	Pedro	4			1									5			
23	FW	(Spain)	Isaac Cuenca	1			1			1						3			
27	FW	(Spain)	Gerard Deulofeu																
37	FW	(Spain)	Cristian Tello	1												1			
–	DF	(Brazil)	Maxwell	1												1			

Last updated: 25 May
Source: Competitive matches and LFP.com, sportec.es
Ordered by (red card) , (second yellow card) and (yellow card)
(yellow card) = Number of bookings; (second yellow card) = Number of sending offs after a second yellow card; (red card) = Number of sending offs by a direct red card.

Italic: denotes no longer with club.

== Pre-season and friendlies ==
23 July 2011 Summer Tour	Hajduk Split	0–0	Barcelona	Split, Croatia
20:30 CEST		Report		Stadium: Poljud Stadium; Attendance: 35,000; Referee: Goran Gabrilo (Croatia)

26 July 2011 Audi Cup Semi-final	Barcelona	2–2 (4–2 p)	Internacional	Munich, Germany
18:15 CEST	Thiago 15'; Busquets (yellow card) 45'; Dos Santos 62'	Report	Moledo (yellow card) 32'; Nei 55'; Tinga (yellow card) 67'; Leandro Damião 85'	Stadium: Allianz Arena; Attendance: 69,000; Referee: Felix Brych (Germany)
	Penalties
	Villa (penalty scored); Dos Santos (penalty scored); Carmona (penalty scored); Jeffrén (penalty missed); Armando (penalty scored)		(penalty scored) Kléber; (penalty missed) Leandro Damião; (penalty scored) João Paulo; (penalty missed) Zé Mário

27 July 2011 Audi Cup Final	Bayern Munich	0–2	Barcelona	Munich, Germany
20:45 CEST		Report	Thiago 42', 75'	Stadium: Allianz Arena; Attendance: 69,000; Referee: Wolfgang Stark (Germany)

30 July 2011 World Football Challenge	Barcelona	1–2	Manchester United	Landover, Maryland, United States
19:00 EDT	Dos Santos (yellow card) 30'; Thiago 70'	Report	Nani 22'; Owen 76'	Stadium: FedExField; Attendance: 81,107; Referee: Ricardo Salazar (United States)

3 August 2011 World Football Challenge	Barcelona	1–4	Guadalajara	Miami Gardens, Florida, United States
20:00 EDT	Villa 4'	Report	Fabián 60', 63'; Casillas 72'; Verduzco 90+2'	Stadium: Sun Life Stadium; Attendance: 70,080; Referee: Baldomero Toledo (United States)

6 August 2011 World Football Challenge	Barcelona	2–0	América	Arlington, Texas, United States
15:00 CDT	Villa 24'; Busquets (yellow card) 61'; Keita 89'	Report	Medina (yellow card) 45'	Stadium: Cowboys Stadium; Attendance: 60,807; Referee: Ricardo Salazar (United States)

22 August 2011 Joan Gamper Trophy	Barcelona	5–0	Napoli	Barcelona, Spain
19:00 CEST	Fàbregas 26'; Keita 31'; Pedro 62'; Messi 66', 77'	Report	Lavezzi (yellow card) 37'; Ruiz (yellow card) 81'	Stadium: Camp Nou; Attendance: 78,002; Referee: Álvarez Izquierdo (Catalonia)

== Competitions ==
=== Supercopa de España ===
14 August 2011 First leg	Real Madrid	2–2	Barcelona	Madrid
22:00 CEST	Özil 13'; Khedira (yellow card) 32'; Alonso 54', (yellow card) 78'; Coentrão (yellow card) 90+1'	Report	Villa 36'; Messi 45'; Sánchez (yellow card) 55'; Dani Alves (yellow card) 90+3'	Stadium: Santiago Bernabéu; Attendance: 81,177; Referee: Teixeira Vitienes (Cantabria)

17 August 2011 Second leg	Barcelona	3–2 (5–4 agg.)	Real Madrid	Barcelona
23:00 CEST	Iniesta 15'; Xavi (yellow card) 42'; Messi 45', 88'; Mascherano (yellow card) 54'; Valdés (yellow card) 90+3'; Villa (red card) 90+5'	Report	Ronaldo 20', (yellow card) 54'; Khedira (yellow card) 28'; Marcelo (yellow card) 55' (red card) 90+4'; Pepe (yellow card) 62'; Ramos (yellow card) 76'; Benzema 82'; Coentrão (yellow card) 84'; Özil (red card) 90+5'	Stadium: Camp Nou; Attendance: 92,965; Referee: Fernández Borbalán (Andalusia)

=== UEFA Super Cup ===
26 August 2011 Final	Barcelona (Spain)	2–0	(Portugal) Porto	Monaco
20:45 CEST	Messi 39'; Iniesta (yellow card) 51'; Fàbregas 87'	Report	C. Rodríguez (yellow card) 30'; Rolando (yellow card) 65' (yellow-red card) 86'; Guarín (yellow card) 82' (red card) 90'	Stadium: Stade Louis II; Attendance: 18,048; Referee: Björn Kuipers (Netherlands)

=== FIFA Club World Cup ===
14 December 2011 Semi-finals	Al-Sadd (Qatar)	0–4	(Spain) Barcelona	Yokohama, Japan
11:30 CET	Majid (yellow card) 62'; Kasola (yellow card) 80'	Report	Adriano 25', 43'; Keita 64'; Maxwell 81'	Stadium: International Stadium Yokohama; Attendance: 66,298; Referee: Joel Aguilar (El Salvador)

18 December 2011 Final	Santos (Brazil)	0–4	(Spain) Barcelona	Yokohama, Japan
11:30 CET	Ganso (yellow card) 73'; Dracena (yellow card) 75'	Report	Messi 17', 82'; Xavi 24'; Piqué (yellow card) 39'; Fàbregas 45'; Mascherano (yellow card) 71'	Stadium: International Stadium Yokohama; Attendance: 68,166; Referee: Ravshan Irmatov (Uzbekistan)

=== La Liga ===
==== League table ====
Pos	Team	Pld	W	D	L	GF	GA	GD	Pts	Qualification or relegation
1	Real Madrid (C)	38	32	4	2	121	32	+89	100	Qualification for the Champions League group stage
2	Barcelona	38	28	7	3	114	29	+85	91	Qualification for the Champions League group stage
3	Valencia	38	17	10	11	59	44	+15	61	Qualification for the Champions League group stage
4	Málaga	38	17	7	14	54	53	+1	58	Qualification for the Champions League play-off round
5	Atlético Madrid	38	15	11	12	53	46	+7	56	Qualification for the Europa League group stage (Note: Atlético Madrid won the 2011–12 UEFA Europa League and thus secured the title holder spot in the group stage of the 2012–13 UEFA Europa League.)

Source: ESPN
Rules for classification: 1st points; 2nd head-to-head points; 3rd head-to-head goal difference; 4th head-to-head goals scored; 5th goal difference; 6th number of goals scored; 7th Fair-play points
(C) Champions

==== Results by round ====
Round	2	3	4	5	6	7	8	9	10	11	12	13	14	15	16	17	18	19	1	21	22	23	24	25	26	27	28	29	29	31	32	33	34	35	36	20	37	38
Ground	H	A	H	A	H	A	H	H	A	H	A	H	A	H	H	A	A	H	A	A	H	A	H	A	H	A	A	H	A	H	A	H	A	H	A	H	H	A
Result	W	D	W	D	W	W	W	D	W	W	D	W	L	W	W	W	D	W	W	D	W	L	W	W	W	W	W	W	W	W	W	W	W	L	W	W	W	D
Position	2	4	3	4	2	1	1	3	3	2	2	2	2	2	2	2	2	2	2	2	2	2	2	2	2	2	2	2	2	2	2	2	2	2	2	2	2	2

Source: Competitive matches
A = Away; H = Home; W = Win; D = Draw; L = Loss

==== Matches ====
29 August 2011 2	Barcelona	5–0	Villarreal	Barcelona
21:00 CEST (UTC+02:00)	Thiago 24'; Mascherano (yellow card) 33'; Fàbregas (yellow card) 35', (goal) 44'; Sánchez 46', (yellow card) 48'; Messi 51', 73'	Report	Zapata (yellow card) 20'; Wakaso (yellow card) 84'; Marchena (yellow card) 88'	Stadium: Camp Nou; Attendance: 75,097; Referee: Javier Turienzo Álvarez (Castile and León)

10 September 2011 3	Real Sociedad	2–2	Barcelona	San Sebastián
18:00 CEST (UTC+02:00)	Agirretxe 59'; Griezmann 60'; Cadamuro-Bentaïba (yellow card) 82'	Report	Xavi 10'; Fàbregas 11'; Busquets (yellow card) 62'; Messi (yellow card) 90+3'	Stadium: Anoeta; Attendance: 31,000; Referee: Antonio Mateu Lahoz (Valencian Community)

17 September 2011 4	Barcelona	8–0	Osasuna	Barcelona
20:00 CEST (UTC+02:00)	Messi 5', 41', 79'; Fàbregas 13'; Villa 34', 76', (yellow card) 36'; Rovérsio 40' (o.g.); Xavi 57'	Report	Lamah (yellow card) 44'; García (yellow card) 48'; Ibrahima (yellow card) 74'; Timor (yellow card) 82'; Damià (yellow card) 83'	Stadium: Camp Nou; Attendance: 70,549; Referee: César Muñiz Fernández (Asturias)

21 September 2011 5	Valencia	2–2	Barcelona	Valencia
22:00 CEST (UTC+02:00)	Abidal 12' (o.g.); Rami (yellow card) 15'; Hernández 23'; Soldado (yellow card) 37'; Canales (yellow card) 53'; Jonas (yellow card) 87'; Alba (red card) 90+1'	Report	Pedro 14'; Fàbregas 77'; Mascherano (yellow card) 88'	Stadium: Mestalla; Attendance: 52,250; Referee: Carlos Velasco Carballo (Community of Madrid)

24 September 2011 6	Barcelona	5–0	Atlético Madrid	Barcelona
22:00 CEST (UTC+02:00)	Villa 9'; Miranda 15' (o.g.); Messi 26', 78', 90+1'; Piqué (yellow card) 71'	Report	Perea (yellow card) 72'	Stadium: Camp Nou; Attendance: 83,154; Referee: Carlos Delgado Ferreiro (Basque Country)

2 October 2011 7	Sporting Gijón	0–1	Barcelona	Gijón
20:00 CEST (UTC+02:00)	Cases (yellow card) 34'; Castro (yellow card) 87'	Report	Adriano 12'; Pedro (yellow card) 50'; Busquets (yellow card) 90+3'	Stadium: El Molinón; Attendance: 28,500; Referee: Carlos Clos Gómez (Aragon)

15 October 2011 8	Barcelona	3–0	Racing Santander	Barcelona
20:00 CEST (UTC+02:00)	Messi 11', 68'; Xavi 27'	Report	Diop (yellow card) 21'; Bedia (yellow card) 80'	Stadium: Camp Nou; Attendance: 82,225; Referee: Miguel Ángel Ayza Gámez (Valencian Community)

22 October 2011 9	Barcelona	0–0	Sevilla	Barcelona
22:00 CEST (UTC+02:00)	Mascherano (yellow card) 45+2'; Iniesta (yellow card) 75'; Fàbregas (yellow card) 90+4'	Report	Navas (yellow card) 42'; Navarro (yellow card) 54' (yellow-red card) 90+7'; Varas (yellow card) 57'; Medel (yellow card) 66'; Cáceres (yellow card) 68'; Fazio (yellow card) 90'; Kanouté (yellow card) 90+3' (red card) 90+4'; Escudé (yellow card) 90+7'	Stadium: Camp Nou; Attendance: 82,743; Referee: Eduardo Iturralde González (Basque Country)

25 October 2011 10	Granada	0–1	Barcelona	Granada
20:00 CEST (UTC+02:00)	Uche (yellow card) 3'; Romero (yellow card) 35' (yellow-red card) 53'; F. Rico (yellow card) 36'; Benítez (yellow card) 63' (yellow-red card) 90+2'; Nyom (yellow card) 87'	Report	Dani Alves (yellow card) 26'; Xavi 33'; Busquets (yellow card) 62'; Cuenca (yellow card) 66'; Keita (yellow card) 90'	Stadium: Los Cármenes; Attendance: 22,000; Referee: César Muñiz Fernández (Asturias)

29 October 2011 11	Barcelona	5–0	Mallorca	Barcelona
20:00 CEST (UTC+02:00)	Messi 13' (pen.), 21', 30'; Cuenca 50'; Dani Alves (yellow card) 74', (goal) 90+2'	Report	Nsue (yellow card) 12'; Bigas (yellow card) 90+1'	Stadium: Camp Nou; Attendance: 80,635; Referee: Pedro Jesús Pérez Montero (Andalusia)

6 November 2011 12	Athletic Bilbao	2–2	Barcelona	Bilbao
20:00 CEST (UTC+01:00)	Herrera 20', (yellow card) 22'; Martínez (yellow card) 48'; Iturraspe (yellow card) 53'; Amorebieta (yellow card) 69' (yellow-red card) 90+1'; Piqué 80' (o.g.)	Report	Fàbregas 24'; Piqué (yellow card) 63'; Messi 90+1'	Stadium: San Mamés; Attendance: 38,000; Referee: José Luis Paradas Romero (Andalusia)

19 November 2011 13	Barcelona	4–0	Zaragoza	Barcelona
20:00 CEST (UTC+01:00)	Piqué 18', (yellow card) 61'; Messi 43'; Puyol 54'; Villa 75'; Dani Alves (yellow card) 88'	Report	Lanzaro (yellow card) 26'; Juárez (yellow card) 28'; Micael (yellow card) 63'	Stadium: Camp Nou; Attendance: 66,692; Referee: Alberto Undiano Mallenco (Navarre)

26 November 2011 14	Getafe	1–0	Barcelona	Getafe
22:00 CEST (UTC+01:00)	Lacen (yellow card) 24'; Casquero (yellow card) 47'; Valera 68'; Castro (yellow card) 71'; Lopo (yellow card) 78'	Report	Maxwell (yellow card) 19'; Piqué (yellow card) 44'; Busquets (yellow card) 89'	Stadium: Alfonso Pérez; Attendance: 13,600; Referee: Fernando Teixeira Vitienes (Cantabria)

29 November 2011 17	Barcelona	4–0	Rayo Vallecano	Barcelona
21:00 CEST (UTC+01:00)	Sánchez 29', 41'; Villa 43'; Messi 50'; Valdés (yellow card) 80'; Piqué (yellow card) 84'	Report	Bangoura (yellow card) 39'; Jordi (yellow card) 45'; Arribas (yellow card) 60'	Stadium: Camp Nou; Attendance: 53,775; Referee: Miguel Ángel Pérez Lasa (Basque Country)

3 December 2011 15	Barcelona	5–0	Levante	Barcelona
20:00 CEST (UTC+01:00)	Fàbregas 3', 32', (yellow card) 45'; Cuenca 36'; Messi 53'; Sánchez 59'; Valdés (yellow card) 90+1'	Report	Venta (yellow card) 26'; Ballesteros (yellow card) 32'; Del Horno (yellow card) 42'	Stadium: Camp Nou; Attendance: 79,361; Referee: José Antonio Teixeira Vitienes (Cantabria)

10 December 2011 16	Real Madrid	1–3	Barcelona	Madrid
22:00 CEST (UTC+01:00)	Benzema 1'; Alonso (yellow card) 26'; Diarra (yellow card) 61'; Pepe (yellow card) 63'; Ramos (yellow card) 70'	Report	Sánchez (yellow card) 27', (goal) 30'; Messi (yellow card) 37'; Piqué (yellow card) 48'; Xavi 53'; Fàbregas 66'	Stadium: Santiago Bernabéu; Attendance: 85,400; Referee: David Fernández Borbalán (Andalusia)

8 January 2012 18	Espanyol	1–1	Barcelona	Cornellà de Llobregat
21:30 CEST (UTC+01:00)	Romaric (yellow card) 45+1'; Rodríguez (yellow card) 70'; Vázquez (yellow card) 76', (goal) 86'; S. García (yellow card) 86'; Amat (yellow card) 90'; Forlín (yellow card) 90+1'; Casilla (yellow card) 90+3'	Report	Messi (yellow card) 14'; Fàbregas 16'	Stadium: Cornellà-El Prat; Attendance: 35,122; Referee: Javier Turienzo Álvarez (Castile and León)

15 January 2012 19	Barcelona	4–2	Real Betis	Barcelona
21:30 CEST (UTC+01:00)	Xavi 10'; Messi 12', 86' (pen.), (yellow card) 44'; Puyol (yellow card) 49'; Iniesta (yellow card) 69'; Sánchez 75'	Report	Castro 32'; Iriney (yellow card) 43'; Sevilla (yellow card) 46'; Santa Cruz 52'; Mario (yellow card) 60' (yellow-red card) 70'; Matilla (yellow card) 81'; Dorado (yellow card) 85'	Stadium: Camp Nou; Attendance: 69,889; Referee: Ignacio Iglesias Villanueva (Galicia)

22 January 2012 1	Málaga	1–4	Barcelona	Málaga
18:00 CEST (UTC+01:00)	Camacho (yellow card) 62'; Rondón 85'	Report	Messi 33', 51', 81'; Sánchez 48'	Stadium: La Rosaleda; Attendance: 22,572; Referee: Alberto Undiano Mallenco (Navarre)

28 January 2012 21	Villarreal	0–0	Barcelona	Villarreal
22:00 CEST (UTC+01:00)	Musacchio (yellow card) 30'; Ruben (yellow card) 38'; Senna (yellow card) 68'; Joselu (yellow card) 77'; Rodríguez (yellow card) 84'	Report	Thiago (yellow card) 89'; Dani Alves (yellow card) 90+2'	Stadium: El Madrigal; Attendance: 17,000; Referee: José Antonio Teixeira Vitienes (Cantabria)

4 February 2012 22	Barcelona	2–1	Real Sociedad	Barcelona
22:00 CEST (UTC+01:00)	Tello 8'; Messi 72'	Report	I. Martínez (yellow card) 34'; Vela 73'; Llorente (yellow card) 88'	Stadium: Camp Nou; Attendance: 52,646; Referee: Carlos Clos Gómez (Aragon)

11 February 2012 23	Osasuna	3–2	Barcelona	Pamplona
20:00 CEST (UTC+01:00)	Lekić 5', 22'; R. García 56', (yellow card) 61'; Puñal (yellow card) 70'	Report	Roberto (yellow card) 16'; Sánchez (yellow card) 36', (goal) 51'; Dani Alves (yellow card) 57'; Tello 73'; Valdés (yellow card) 85'; Mascherano (yellow card) 90+1' (yellow-red card) 90+6'	Stadium: El Sadar; Attendance: 17,283; Referee: José Luis Paradas Romero (Andalusia)
Note: Manager Pep Guardiola was shown (yellow card) 86' and Mascherano shown second (yellow card) after the final whistle.

19 February 2012 24	Barcelona	5–1	Valencia	Barcelona
21:30 CEST (UTC+01:00)	Messi 22', 27', 76', 85'; Xavi 90+1'	Report	Albelda (yellow card) 4'; Piatti 9'; R. Costa (yellow card) 34'; Soldado (yellow card) 65'	Stadium: Camp Nou; Attendance: 74,240; Referee: Javier Turienzo Álvarez (Castile and León)

26 February 2012 25	Atlético Madrid	1–2	Barcelona	Madrid
18:00 CEST (UTC+01:00)	Godín (yellow card) 23'; Juanfran (yellow card) 25'; Turan (yellow card) 30'; Falcao 49', (yellow card) 85'; Tiago (yellow card) 60'; Koke (yellow card) 74'	Report	Messi (yellow card) 8', (goal) 81'; Dani Alves 36', (yellow card) 70'; Fàbregas (yellow card) 45'; Sánchez (yellow card) 76'; Busquets (yellow card) 90'	Stadium: Vicente Calderón; Attendance: 53,000; Referee: Miguel Ángel Pérez Lasa (Basque Country)

3 March 2012 26	Barcelona	3–1	Sporting Gijón	Barcelona
20:00 CEST (UTC+02:00)	Iniesta 42', (yellow card) 47'; Piqué (red card) 46'; Xavi (yellow card) 71', (goal) 88'; Keita (yellow card) 77', (goal) 79'; Dani Alves (yellow card) 82'	Report	Ayoze (yellow card) 28'; Canella (yellow card) 29'; Barral 49', (yellow card) 81'; De las Cuevas (yellow card) 64'; Castro (yellow card) 73'; Carmelo (yellow card) 74'; Eguren (yellow card) 79'; Gálvez (yellow card) 84'	Stadium: Camp Nou; Attendance: 72,442; Referee: Carlos Velasco Carballo (Community of Madrid)

11 March 2012 27	Racing Santander	0–2	Barcelona	Santander
18:00 CEST (UTC+02:00)	Francis (yellow card) 11'; Babacar (yellow card) 23'; Álvaro (yellow card) 55'; Cisma (yellow card) 55'; Diop (yellow card) 56'; Stuani (yellow card) 88'	Report	Messi 29', 56' (pen.)	Stadium: El Sardinero; Attendance: 18,885; Referee: Carlos del Cerro Grande (Community of Madrid)

17 March 2012 28	Sevilla	0–2	Barcelona	Seville
20:00 CEST (UTC+02:00)	Spahić (yellow card) 17'; Escudé (yellow card) 50'; Medel (yellow card) 76'	Report	Xavi 17'; Messi 24'; Piqué (yellow card) 31'; Adriano (yellow card) 80'; Pedro (yellow card) 83'	Stadium: Ramón Sánchez Pizjuán; Attendance: 44,500; Referee: José Luis González González (Castile and León)

20 March 2012 29	Barcelona	5–3	Granada	Barcelona
21:00 CEST (UTC+02:00)	Xavi 4'; Messi 17', 67', 86'; Keita (yellow card) 48'; Tello 82'; Mascherano (yellow card) 89'	Report	Ighalo (yellow card) 10'; Bénitez (yellow card) 34'; Mainz 55'; Cortés (yellow card) 59'; Siqueira 62' (pen.), 89' (pen.); Hurtado (yellow card) 64'; Gómez (yellow card) 66'; Geijo (yellow card) 90+1'; Abel (yellow card) 90+3'	Stadium: Camp Nou; Attendance: 62,401; Referee: José Antonio Teixeira Vitienes (Cantabria)

24 March 2012 30	Mallorca	0–2	Barcelona	Palma
18:00 CEST (UTC+02:00)	Pereira (yellow card) 27'; Ramis (yellow card) 40'	Report	Messi 25'; Thiago (yellow card) 36' (yellow-red card) 56'; Piqué 79'; Puyol (yellow card) 88'	Stadium: Iberostar; Referee: Miguel Ángel Ayza Gámez (Valencian Community)
Note: Thiago's second (yellow card) in the 56th minute was withdrawn by the Competition Committee on 29 March.

31 March 2012 31	Barcelona	2–0	Athletic Bilbao	Barcelona
22:00 CEST (UTC+02:00)	Iniesta 40'; Messi 58' (pen.); Busquets (yellow card) 66'	Report	Toquero (yellow card) 52'; Iturraspe (yellow card) 56'; Martínez (yellow card) 58'	Stadium: Camp Nou; Attendance: 88,207; Referee: Antonio Mateu Lahoz (Valencian Community)

7 April 2012 32	Zaragoza	1–4	Barcelona	Zaragoza
20:00 CEST (UTC+02:00)	Zuculini (yellow card) 27'; Aranda 30'; Abraham (yellow card) 35' (yellow-red card) 45'; Micael (yellow card) 58'; Lanzaro (yellow card) 82'	Report	Valdés (yellow card) 23'; Puyol 36'; Messi 39', 86' (pen.); Keita (yellow card) 43'; Adriano (yellow card) 58'; Fàbregas (yellow card) 89'; Pedro 90+2'; Thiago (yellow card) 90+4'	Stadium: La Romareda; Attendance: 34,000; Referee: Javier Turienzo Álvarez (Castile and León)

10 April 2012 33	Barcelona	4–0	Getafe	Barcelona
21:00 CEST (UTC+02:00)	Sánchez 13', 73'; Messi 44', (yellow card) 51'; Pedro 75'	Report	Gavilán (yellow card) 78'	Stadium: Camp Nou; Attendance: 76,041; Referee: José Luis González González (Castile and León)

14 April 2012 34	Levante	1–2	Barcelona	Valencia
22:00 CEST (UTC+02:00)	Barkero 23' (pen.); Botelho (yellow card) 45'; Iborra (yellow card) 67'; Cabral (yellow card) 68'; Valdo (yellow card) 70'; Juanfran (yellow card) 71'	Report	Busquets (yellow card) 23'; Adriano (yellow card) 39'; Messi 64', 72' (pen.)	Stadium: Ciutat de València; Attendance: 23,000; Referee: José Antonio Teixeira Vitienes (Cantabria)

21 April 2012 35	Barcelona	1–2	Real Madrid	Barcelona
20:00 CEST (UTC+02:00)	Busquets (yellow card) 15'; Sánchez 70'; Mascherano (yellow card) 86'	Report	Khedira 17'; Pepe (yellow card) 43'; Alonso (yellow card) 47'; Ronaldo 73'; Özil (yellow card) 77'; Granero (yellow card) 78'	Stadium: Camp Nou; Attendance: 99,252; Referee: Alberto Undiano Mallenco (Navarre)

29 April 2012 36	Rayo Vallecano	0–7	Barcelona	Vallecas
21:30 CEST (UTC+02:00)	Trashorras (yellow card) 21'; Núñez (yellow card) 34'; Tito (yellow card) 36'; Arribas (yellow card) 45+2'; Michu (yellow card) 90+2'	Report	Messi 16', 90'; Sánchez 26'; Keita 38'; Pedro 47', 87', (yellow card) 53'; Thiago 77'	Stadium: Campo Vallecas; Attendance: 12,300; Referee: Carlos Delgado Ferreiro (Basque Country)

2 May 2012 20	Barcelona	4–1	Málaga	Barcelona
20:00 CEST (UTC+02:00)	Puyol 13'; Messi 35' (pen.), 59' (pen.), 64'; Pedro (yellow card) 67'; Fàbregas (yellow card) 82'	Report	Rondón 26'; Camacho (yellow card) 57'; Duda (yellow card) 58'	Stadium: Camp Nou; Attendance: 67,854; Referee: Javier Turienzo Álvarez (Castile and León)

5 May 2012 37	Barcelona	4–0	Espanyol	Barcelona
21:00 CEST (UTC+02:00)	Messi 12', 64' (pen.), 74', 79' (pen.); Busquets (yellow card) 20'; Montoya (yellow card) 71'; Tello (yellow card) 84'; Puyol (yellow card) 89'	Report	Forlín (yellow card) 4'; Sánchez (yellow card) 30'; Álvarez (yellow card) 63'; Vilà (yellow card) 63'; Gómez (yellow card) 63'	Stadium: Camp Nou; Attendance: 89,044; Referee: Fernando Teixeira Vitienes (Cantabria)

12 May 2012 38	Real Betis	2–2	Barcelona	Seville
22:00 CEST (UTC+02:00)	Castro 70', 73'; Beñat (yellow card) 81'; Cañas (yellow card) 90'	Report	Busquets 8'; Dani Alves (yellow card) 32' (yellow-red card) 53'; Keita 90+1'	Stadium: Benito Villamarín; Attendance: 55,000; Referee: Miguel Ángel Ayza Gámez (Valencian Community)

=== Copa del Rey ===
Kickoff times are in CET.

==== Round of 32 ====
9 November 2011 First leg	L'Hospitalet	0–1	Barcelona	L'Hospitalet de Llobregat
22:00 CET (UTC+01:00)	Viale (yellow card) 38'	Report	Iniesta 41'	Stadium: La Feixa Llarga; Attendance: 2,500; Referee: Carlos del Cerro Grande (Community of Madrid)

22 December 2011 Second leg	Barcelona	9–0 (10–0 agg.)	L'Hospitalet	Barcelona
22:00 CET (UTC+01:00)	Pedro 13' (pen.); Iniesta 20'; Thiago 24', 55' (pen.); Xavi 37'; Tello 44', 64'; Cuenca 49', 81'	Report	Viale (yellow card) 54'	Stadium: Camp Nou; Attendance: 56,480; Referee: José Luis González González (Castille and León)

==== Round of 16 ====
4 January 2012 First leg	Barcelona	4–0	Osasuna	Barcelona
22:00 CET (UTC+01:00)	Fàbregas 14', 18', (yellow card) 17'; Cuenca (yellow card) 31'; Messi 73', 90+2'	Report	Nekounam (yellow card) 28'; Sergio (yellow card) 44'	Stadium: Camp Nou; Attendance: 64,124; Referee: David Fernández Borbalán (Andalusia)

12 January 2012 Second leg	Osasuna	1–2 (1–6 agg.)	Barcelona	Pamplona
22:00 CET (UTC+01:00)	Calleja (yellow card) 36'; Lekić 41'	Report	Sánchez 49'; Roberto 72'	Stadium: El Sadar; Attendance: 12,498; Referee: Carlos Velasco Carballo (Community of Madrid)

==== Quarter-finals ====
18 January 2012 First leg	Real Madrid	1–2	Barcelona	Madrid
22:00 CET (UTC+01:00)	Ronaldo 11'; Pepe (yellow card) 17'; Coentrão (yellow card) 59'; Callejón (yellow card) 68'; Carvalho (yellow card) 87'	Report	Piqué (yellow card) 20'; Puyol 49', (yellow card) 79'; Busquets (yellow card) 55'; Abidal 77'	Stadium: Santiago Bernabéu; Attendance: 83,500; Referee: César Muñiz Fernández (Asturias)

25 January 2012 Second leg	Barcelona	2–2 (4–3 agg.)	Real Madrid	Barcelona
22:00 CET (UTC+01:00)	Pedro 43'; Messi (yellow card) 45'; Dani Alves 45+3'; Puyol (yellow card) 90+1'	Report	Diarra (yellow card) 27'; Ramos (yellow card) 33' (yellow-red card) 88'; Casillas (yellow card) 45+2'; Ronaldo (yellow card) 54', (goal) 68'; Benzema 72'; Coentrão (yellow card) 81'; Granero (yellow card) 90'; Callejón (yellow card) 90+1'; Pepe (yellow card) 90+2'	Stadium: Camp Nou; Attendance: 95,486; Referee: Fernando Teixeira Vitienes (Cantabria)

==== Semi-finals ====
1 February 2012 First leg	Valencia	1–1	Barcelona	Valencia
21:00 CET (UTC+01:00)	Jonas 27', (yellow card) 27'; Banega (yellow card) 34'; Albelda (yellow card) 46'; Ruiz (yellow card) 52'; Alba (yellow card) 74'; Mathieu (yellow card) 87'	Report	Puyol 35'; Mascherano (yellow card) 41'; Pinto (yellow card) 80'	Stadium: Mestalla; Attendance: 51,800; Referee: José Luis González González (Castille and León)

8 February 2012 Second leg	Barcelona	2–0 (3–1 agg.)	Valencia	Barcelona
21:00 CET (UTC+01:00)	Fàbregas 16', (yellow card) 69'; Xavi 81'; Thiago (yellow card) 82'; Dani Alves (yellow card) 86'	Report	Aduriz (yellow card) 22'; Feghouli (yellow card) 45' (yellow-red card) 76'; Ruiz (yellow card) 51'	Stadium: Camp Nou; Attendance: 69,476; Referee: David Fernández Borbalán (Andalusia)

==== Final ====
25 May 2012 Final	Athletic Bilbao	0–3	Barcelona	Madrid
22:00 CET (UTC+02:00)	Susaeta (yellow card) 40'; Iraola (yellow card) 43'	Report	Pedro 3', 25'; Messi 20'; Xavi (yellow card) 66'; Iniesta (yellow card) 71'	Stadium: Vicente Calderón; Attendance: 54,960; Referee: David Fernández Borbalán (Andalusia)

=== UEFA Champions League ===
==== Group stage ====
Pos	Team	Pld	W	D	L	GF	GA	GD	Pts	Qualification
1	(Spain) Barcelona	6	5	1	0	20	4	+16	16	Advance to knockout phase
2	(Italy) Milan	6	2	3	1	11	8	+3	9	Advance to knockout phase
3	(Czech Republic) Viktoria Plzeň	6	1	2	3	4	11	−7	5	Transfer to Europa League
4	(Belarus) BATE Borisov	6	0	2	4	2	14	−12	2	

Source: Soccerway

13 September 2011 1	Barcelona (Spain)	2–2	(Italy) Milan	Barcelona, Spain
20:45 CEST	Pedro 36'; Villa 50'; Villa (yellow card) 52'; Dani Alves (yellow card) 70'; Puyol (yellow card) 90+2'	Report	Pato 1'; Van Bommel (yellow card) 18'; Nesta (yellow card) 57'; Thiago Silva 90+2'	Stadium: Camp Nou; Attendance: 89,861; Referee: Martin Atkinson (England)

28 September 2011 2	BATE Borisov (Belarus)	0–5	(Spain) Barcelona	Minsk, Belarus
20:45 CEST	Simić (yellow card) 80'	Report	Valadzko 19' (o.g.); Pedro 22'; Messi 38', 55'; Dani Alves (yellow card) 77'; Villa 90'	Stadium: Dynama Stadium; Attendance: 29,555; Referee: Manuel Gräfe (Germany)

19 October 2011 3	Barcelona (Spain)	2–0	(Czech Republic) Viktoria Plzeň	Barcelona, Spain
20:45 CEST	Iniesta 10'; Villa 82'	Report		Stadium: Camp Nou; Attendance: 74,376; Referee: Aleksandar Stavrev (Macedonia)

1 November 2011 4	Viktoria Plzeň (Czech Republic)	0–4	(Spain) Barcelona	Prague, Czech Republic
20:45 CET	Pilař (yellow card) 16'; Čišovský (red card) 22'; Limberský (yellow card) 60'; Pavlík (yellow card) 72'; Jiráček (yellow card) 75'; Horváth (yellow card) 76'	Report	Messi 24' (pen.), 45+2', 90+2'; Dani Alves (yellow card) 49'; Fàbregas 72'	Stadium: Synot Tip Arena; Attendance: 20,145; Referee: Robert Schörgenhofer (Austria)

23 November 2011 5	Milan (Italy)	2–3	(Spain) Barcelona	Milan, Italy
20:45 CET	Ibrahimović 20'; Aquilani (yellow card) 24'; Nesta (yellow card) 30'; Van Bommel (yellow card) 34'; Boateng 54'; Zambrotta (yellow card) 86'	Report	Van Bommel 14' (o.g.); Messi (yellow card) 31', (goal) 31' (pen.); Puyol (yellow card) 43'; Abidal (yellow card) 45+3'; Xavi 63'; Mascherano (yellow card) 85'	Stadium: San Siro; Attendance: 78,927; Referee: Wolfgang Stark (Germany)

6 December 2011 6	Barcelona (Spain)	4–0	(Belarus) BATE Borisov	Barcelona, Spain
20:45 CET	Roberto 35'; Montoya 60'; Pedro 63', 88' (pen.)	Report	Yurevich (yellow card) 44'	Stadium: Camp Nou; Attendance: 37,374; Referee: William Collum (Scotland)

==== Knockout phase ====
===== Round of 16 =====
14 February 2012 First leg	Bayer Leverkusen (Germany)	1–3	(Spain) Barcelona	Leverkusen, Germany
20:45 CET	Schwaab (yellow card) 8'; Kadlec 52'; Ćorluka (yellow card) 53'; Castro (yellow card) 80'	Report	Sánchez 41', 55'; Thiago (yellow card) 87'; Messi 88'	Stadium: BayArena; Attendance: 29,400; Referee: Craig Thomson (Scotland)

7 March 2012 Second leg	Barcelona (Spain)	7–1 (10–2 agg.)	(Germany) Bayer Leverkusen	Barcelona, Spain
20:45 CET	Messi 25', 43', 49', 58', 85'; Tello 55', 62'	Report	Rolfes (yellow card) 12'; Castro (yellow card) 45'; Bellarabi 90+1'	Stadium: Camp Nou; Attendance: 75,632; Referee: Svein Oddvar Moen (Norway)

===== Quarter-finals =====
28 March 2012 First leg	Milan (Italy)	0–0	(Spain) Barcelona	Milan, Italy
20:45 CET	Seedorf (yellow card) 23'; Nesta (yellow card) 58'; Ambrosini (yellow card) 70'	Report	Keita (yellow card) 61'	Stadium: San Siro; Attendance: 76,169; Referee: Jonas Eriksson (Sweden)

3 April 2012 Second leg	Barcelona (Spain)	3–1 (3–1 agg.)	(Italy) Milan	Barcelona, Spain
20:45 CET	Messi 11' (pen.), 41' (pen.); Iniesta 53'; Mascherano (yellow card) 66'; Cuenca (yellow card) 86'	Report	Antonini (yellow card) 10'; Nocerino 32'; Nesta (yellow card) 40'; Seedorf (yellow card) 41'; Robinho (yellow card) 77'; Mexès (yellow card) 90+1'; López (yellow card) 90+2'; Nocerino (yellow card) 90+3'	Stadium: Camp Nou; Attendance: 94,629; Referee: Björn Kuipers (Netherlands)

===== Semi-finals =====
18 April 2012 First leg	Chelsea (England)	1–0	(Spain) Barcelona	London, England
20:45 CET	Drogba 45+2'; Ramires (yellow card) 69'; Drogba (yellow card) 86'	Report	Pedro (yellow card) 71'; Busquets (yellow card) 76'	Stadium: Stamford Bridge; Attendance: 38,039; Referee: Felix Brych (Germany)

24 April 2012 Second leg	Barcelona (Spain)	2–2 (2–3 agg.)	(England) Chelsea	Barcelona, Spain
20:45 CET	Busquets 35'; Iniesta 43', (yellow card) 50'; Messi (penalty missed) 49’, (yellow card) 71'	Report	Mikel (yellow card) 32'; Terry (red card) 37'; Ramires (yellow card) 44'; Ramires 45+1'; Ivanović (yellow card) 48'; Čech (yellow card) 59'; Lampard (yellow card) 72'; Meireles (yellow card) 89'; Torres 90+2'	Stadium: Camp Nou; Attendance: 95,845; Referee: Cüneyt Çakır (Turkey)

=== Copa Catalunya ===
8 August 2011 Semifinals	Girona	1–2	Barcelona	Tarragona
	Saizar 32'	Report	Lobato 42'; Riverola 57'	Stadium: Nou Estadi

9 August 2011 Final	Barcelona	0–3	Espanyol	Tarragona
21:45		Report	Thievy 49', 53', 76'	Stadium: Nou Estadi; Attendance: 5,800; Referee: David Miranda Torres
