= David Winner =

David Winner may refer to:

- David Winner (writer) (born 1956), English author and journalist
- David Winner (soccer) (born 1971), retired American soccer goalkeeper

== See also ==
- Dave Winer
