= Verduzco =

Verduzco is a Spanish surname. Notable people with the surname include:

- Adolfo Lugo Verduzco (1933–2022), Mexican politician and speaker
- Jason Verduzco (born 1970), American football player
- José Verduzco (born 1990), Mexican footballer
- Juan Verduzco (1946–2024), Mexican actor
- Mario Verduzco, American football coach
