= List of international goals scored by Gerd Müller =

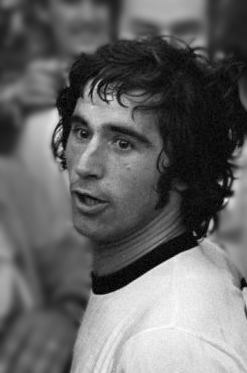
Müller with West Germany at the 1974 FIFA World Cup final.

Gerd Müller was a German professional footballer who represented the West Germany national football team as a striker between 1966 and 1974. He scored his first international goal on 8 April 1967, when he netted four goals in a UEFA Euro 1968 qualifier against Albania. Since then, Müller become his country's all-time top scorer with 68 goals in 62 games until being overtaken by Miroslav Klose on 6 June 2014. He held the record for goals scored in FIFA World Cup tournaments between 1974 and 2006. This record was bettered in 2006 by Brazil's Ronaldo, and eight years later by fellow countryman Klose.

Müller netted eight international hat-tricks, which is a national record and the third-best in Europe, behind Sweden's Sven Rydell with nine and Portugal's Cristiano Ronaldo with ten. On half of those occasions he added a fourth goal in the same match, against Albania, Cyprus, the Soviet Union and Switzerland. This tally includes back-to-back hat-tricks at the 1970 FIFA World Cup against Bulgaria and Peru, being the only player alongside Sándor Kocsis to have done so.

== International goals ==
Scores and results list West Germany's goal tally first.

List of international goals scored by Gerd Müller
No.	Cap	Date	Venue	Opponent	Score	Result	Competition	Ref.
1	2	9 April 1967	Stadion Rote Erde, Dortmund, Germany	Albania	1–0	6–0	UEFA Euro 1968 qualifying	
2	2	9 April 1967	Stadion Rote Erde, Dortmund, Germany	Albania	2–0	6–0	UEFA Euro 1968 qualifying	
3	2	9 April 1967	Stadion Rote Erde, Dortmund, Germany	Albania	3–0	6–0	UEFA Euro 1968 qualifying	
4	2	9 April 1967	Stadion Rote Erde, Dortmund, Germany	Albania	6–0	6–0	UEFA Euro 1968 qualifying	
5	4	27 September 1967	Olympiastadion, Berlin, Germany	France	4–0	5–1	Friendly	
6	5	7 October 1967	Volksparkstadion, Hamburg, Germany	Yugoslavia	2–1	3–1	UEFA Euro 1968 qualifying	
7	7	13 October 1968	Praterstadion, Vienna, Austria	Austria	1–0	2–0	1970 FIFA World Cup qualification	
8	8	23 November 1968	GSP Stadium, Nicosia, Cyprus	Cyprus	1–0	1–0	1970 FIFA World Cup qualification	
9	9	26 March 1969	Waldstadion, Frankfurt, Germany	Wales	1–1	1–1	Friendly	
10	10	16 April 1969	Hampden Park, Glasgow, Scotland	Scotland	1–0	1–1	1970 FIFA World Cup qualification	
11	11	10 May 1969	Städtisches Stadion, Nuremberg, Germany	Austria	1–0	1–0	1970 FIFA World Cup qualification	
12	12	21 May 1969	Georg-Melches-Stadion, Essen, Germany	Cyprus	1–0	12–0	1970 FIFA World Cup qualification	
13	12	21 May 1969	Georg-Melches-Stadion, Essen, Germany	Cyprus	7–0	12–0	1970 FIFA World Cup qualification	
14	12	21 May 1969	Georg-Melches-Stadion, Essen, Germany	Cyprus	9–0	12–0	1970 FIFA World Cup qualification	
15	12	21 May 1969	Georg-Melches-Stadion, Essen, Germany	Cyprus	12–0	12–0	1970 FIFA World Cup qualification	
16	13	21 September 1969	Praterstadion, Vienna, Austria	Austria	1–1	1–1	Friendly	
17	15	22 October 1969	Volksparkstadion, Hamburg, Germany	Scotland	2–1	3–2	1970 FIFA World Cup qualification	
18	20	3 June 1970	Estadio León, León, Mexico	Morocco	2–1	2–1	1970 FIFA World Cup	
19	21	7 June 1970	Estadio León, León, Mexico	Bulgaria	2–1	5–2	1970 FIFA World Cup	
20	21	7 June 1970	Estadio León, León, Mexico	Bulgaria	3–1	5–2	1970 FIFA World Cup	
21	21	7 June 1970	Estadio León, León, Mexico	Bulgaria	5–1	5–2	1970 FIFA World Cup	
22	22	10 June 1970	Estadio León, León, Mexico	Peru	1–0	3–1	1970 FIFA World Cup	
23	22	10 June 1970	Estadio León, León, Mexico	Peru	2–0	3–1	1970 FIFA World Cup	
24	22	10 June 1970	Estadio León, León, Mexico	Peru	3–0	3–1	1970 FIFA World Cup	
25	23	14 June 1970	Estadio León, León, Mexico	England	3–2	3–2	1970 FIFA World Cup	
26	24	17 June 1970	Estadio Azteca, Mexico City, Mexico	Italy	2–1	3–4	1970 FIFA World Cup	
27	24	17 June 1970	Estadio Azteca, Mexico City, Mexico	Italy	3–3	3–4	1970 FIFA World Cup	
28	26	9 September 1970	Städtisches Stadion, Nuremberg, Germany	Hungary	2–0	3–1	Friendly	
29	26	9 September 1970	Städtisches Stadion, Nuremberg, Germany	Hungary	3–1	3–1	Friendly	
30	27	17 October 1970	Müngersdorfer Stadion, Cologne, Germany	Turkey	1–1	1–1	UEFA Euro 1972 qualifying	
31	28	17 February 1971	Qemal Stafa Stadium, Tirana, Albania	Albania	1–0	1–0	UEFA Euro 1972 qualifying	
32	29	25 April 1971	Mithatpaşa Stadium, Istanbul, Turkey	Turkey	1–0	3–0	UEFA Euro 1972 qualifying	
33	29	25 April 1971	Mithatpaşa Stadium, Istanbul, Turkey	Turkey	2–0	3–0	UEFA Euro 1972 qualifying	
34	30	22 June 1971	Ullevaal Stadion, Oslo, Norway	Norway	2–0	7–1	Friendly	
35	30	22 June 1971	Ullevaal Stadion, Oslo, Norway	Norway	4–0	7–1	Friendly	
36	30	22 June 1971	Ullevaal Stadion, Oslo, Norway	Norway	5–0	7–1	Friendly	
37	32	30 June 1971	Københavns Idrætspark, Copenhagen, Denmark	Denmark	1–1	3–1	Friendly	
38	33	8 September 1971	Niedersachsenstadion, Hanover, Germany	Mexico	2–0	5–0	Friendly	
39	33	8 September 1971	Niedersachsenstadion, Hanover, Germany	Mexico	3–0	5–0	Friendly	
40	33	8 September 1971	Niedersachsenstadion, Hanover, Germany	Mexico	5–0	5–0	Friendly	
41	34	10 October 1971	10th-Anniversary Stadium, Warsaw, Poland	Poland	1–1	3–1	UEFA Euro 1972 qualifying	
42	34	10 October 1971	10th-Anniversary Stadium, Warsaw, Poland	Poland	2–1	3–1	UEFA Euro 1972 qualifying	
43	37	29 April 1972	Wembley Stadium, London, England	England	3–1	3–1	UEFA Euro 1972 qualifying	
44	39	26 May 1972	Olympiastadion, Munich, Germany	Soviet Union	1–0	4–1	Friendly	
45	39	26 May 1972	Olympiastadion, Munich, Germany	Soviet Union	2–0	4–1	Friendly	
46	39	26 May 1972	Olympiastadion, Munich, Germany	Soviet Union	3–0	4–1	Friendly	
47	39	26 May 1972	Olympiastadion, Munich, Germany	Soviet Union	4–0	4–1	Friendly	
48	40	14 June 1972	Bosuilstadion, Antwerp, Belgium	Belgium	1–0	2–1	UEFA Euro 1972	
49	40	14 June 1972	Bosuilstadion, Antwerp, Belgium	Belgium	2–0	2–1	UEFA Euro 1972	
50	41	18 June 1972	Heysel Stadium, Brussels, Belgium	Soviet Union	1–0	3–0	UEFA Euro 1972	
51	41	18 June 1972	Heysel Stadium, Brussels, Belgium	Soviet Union	3–0	3–0	UEFA Euro 1972	
52	42	15 November 1972	Rheinstadion, Düsseldorf, Germany	Switzerland	1–0	5–1	Friendly	
53	42	15 November 1972	Rheinstadion, Düsseldorf, Germany	Switzerland	2–0	5–1	Friendly	
54	42	15 November 1972	Rheinstadion, Düsseldorf, Germany	Switzerland	3–0	5–1	Friendly	
55	42	15 November 1972	Rheinstadion, Düsseldorf, Germany	Switzerland	5–0	5–1	Friendly	
56	43	28 March 1973	Rheinstadion, Düsseldorf, Germany	Czechoslovakia	1–0	3–0	Friendly	
57	43	28 March 1973	Rheinstadion, Düsseldorf, Germany	Czechoslovakia	2–0	3–0	Friendly	
58	47	5 September 1973	Central Lenin Stadium, Moscow, Soviet Union	Soviet Union	1–0	1–0	Friendly	
59	48	10 October 1973	Niedersachsenstadion, Hanover, Germany	Austria	1–0	4–0	Friendly	
60	48	10 October 1973	Niedersachsenstadion, Hanover, Germany	Austria	3–0	4–0	Friendly	
61	49	13 October 1973	Parkstadion, Gelsenkirchen, Germany	France	1–0	2–1	Friendly	
62	49	13 October 1973	Parkstadion, Gelsenkirchen, Germany	France	2–0	2–1	Friendly	
63	54	17 April 1974	Westfalenstadion, Dortmund, Germany	Hungary	4–0	5–0	Friendly	
64	54	17 April 1974	Westfalenstadion, Dortmund, Germany	Hungary	5–0	5–0	Friendly	
65	57	18 June 1974	Volksparkstadion, Hamburg, Germany	Australia	3–0	3–0	1974 FIFA World Cup	
66	59	26 June 1974	Rheinstadion, Düsseldorf, Germany	Yugoslavia	2–0	2–0	1974 FIFA World Cup	
67	61	3 July 1974	Waldstadion, Frankfurt, Germany	Poland	1–0	1–0	1974 FIFA World Cup	
68	62	7 July 1974	Olympiastadion, Munich, Germany	Netherlands	2–1	2–1	1974 FIFA World Cup	

== Hat-tricks ==
No.	Date	Venue	Opponent	Goals	Result	Competition	Ref.
1	8 April 1967	Stadion Rote Erde, Dortmund, Germany	Albania	4 – (6', 25', 73', 85'(pen.))	6–0	UEFA Euro 1968 qualifying	
2	21 May 1969	Georg-Melches-Stadion, Essen, Germany	Cyprus	4 – (3', 43', 49', 85')	12–0	1970 FIFA World Cup qualifying	
3	7 June 1970	Nou Camp, León, Mexico	Bulgaria	3 – (28', 52' (pen.), 82')	5–2	1970 FIFA World Cup Group stage	
4	10 June 1970	Nou Camp, León, Mexico	Peru	3 – (20', 26', 39')	3–1	1970 FIFA World Cup Group stage	
5	22 June 1971	Ullevaal Stadion, Oslo, Norway	Norway	3 – (30', 47', 52')	7–1	Friendly	
6	8 September 1971	Niedersachsenstadion, Hanover, Germany	Mexico	3 – (12', 14', 55')	5–0	Friendly	
7	26 May 1972	Olympiastadion, Munich, Germany	Soviet Union	4 – (49', 52', 58', 65')	4–1	Friendly	
8	15 November 1972	Rheinstadion, Düsseldorf, Germany	Switzerland	4 – (23', 30', 47', 77')	5–1	Friendly	

== Statistics ==
Germany national team
Year	Apps	Goals
1966	1	0
1967	4	6
1968	3	2
1969	7	9
1970	12	13
1971	8	12
1972	7	13
1973	8	7
1974	12	6
Total	62	68

Goals by competition
Competition	Goals
Friendlies	29
UEFA European Championship qualifying	12
UEFA European Championship	4
FIFA World Cup qualification	9
FIFA World Cup	14
Total	68

Goals by opponent
Opponent	Goals
Soviet Union	7
Albania	5
Austria	5
Cyprus	5
Hungary	4
Switzerland	4
Bulgaria	3
France	3
Mexico	3
Norway	3
Peru	3
Poland	3
Turkey	3
Belgium	2
Czech Republic	2
England	2
Italy	2
Scotland	2
Yugoslavia	2
Australia	1
Denmark	1
Morocco	1
Netherlands	1
Wales	1
Total	68

== See also ==
- List of men's footballers with 50 or more international goals
