= 1980 Fort Lauderdale Strikers season =

Fort Lauderdale Strikers
1980 season
- Owner: (United States) Elizabeth Robbie
- General manager: (Canada) Bob Lemieux (fired Oct. 14) (United States) Tim Robbie
- Manager: (Netherlands) Cor van der Hart
- Stadium: Lockhart Stadium
- NASL: Division:Second Place; NASL Championship: Finalist
- Top goalscorer: League: (Peru) Teófilo Cubillas (Germany) Gerd Müller (14 goals); All: (Peru) Teófilo Cubillas (18 goals)
- Average home league attendance: 14,360
Home colors	Away colors

The 1980 Fort Lauderdale Strikers season was the fourth season of the Fort Lauderdale Striker's team, and the club's fourteenth season in professional soccer. This year the team made it to the finals of North American Soccer League by reaching the Soccer Bowl. They were this year's Runners-up.

== Competitions ==
=== Friendlies ===
Fort Lauderdale finished their preseason exhibition schedule with one victory over an NCAA Division II squad, and two draws versus Peruvian First Division teams, three losses against NASL clubs and one loss to an NCAA Division II team. In April after the NASL season had begun, the Strikers easily handled the Miami Hurricanes and the junior side, Calry Bohemian FC, of Sligo, Ireland. They later fell to visiting Sunderland A.F.C. in a midseason friendly in May.

==== Results summaries ====
Date	Opponent	Venue	Result	Attendance	Scorers
March 2, 1980	FIU Sunblazers	FIU South Campus	2–3		???, ???
March 9, 1980	Miami Dade North Falcons	Dade North Stadium	8–0		Müller (3), Bonvallet (3), Cubillas, Cacciatore
March 12, 1980	Detroit Express	Leonard High School	0–1		
March 16, 1980	Detroit Express	Bryant Stadium	1–2(SO)		Nico Bodonczy
March 19, 1980	Minnesota Kicks	Coral Springs High School	0–1		
March 21, 1980	Atlanta Chiefs	Lockhart Stadium	–	–	MATCH CANCELED
March 22, 1980	(Peru) Alianza Lima	Estadio Alianza	1–1	35,000	David Irving
March 24, 1980	(Peru) Club Universitario	Estadio Alianza	1–1	35,000	Gerd Müller
April 14, 1980	Miami Hurricanes	Mark Light Stadium	6–1		David Irving
April 16, 1980	(Republic of Ireland) Calry Bohemian FC	Strikers practice facility	8–0		David Irving (3), Nico Bodonczy (2), Mike Ortiz-Velez (2)
May 14, 1980	(England) Sunderland A.F.C.	Lockhart Stadium	1–2	4,649	Ray Hudson (pk)

=== NASL Playoffs ===
Playoffs

In 1979 and 1980, if a playoff series was tied at one victory each, a full 30 minute mini-game was played. If neither team held an advantage after the 30 minutes, the teams would then move on to a shoot-out to determine a series winner.

==== First round ====
Lower seed		Higher seed	Game 1	Game 2	Mini-game
California Surf	-	Fort Lauderdale Strikers	1–2	2–0	0–1 (SO, 2–3)	August 28 • Anaheim Stadium • 2,929; August 31 • Lockhart Stadium • 15,282

==== Conference semifinals ====
Lower seed		Higher seed	Game 1	Game 2	Mini-game
Edmonton Drillers	-	Fort Lauderdale Strikers	0–1	3–2 (SO, 2–1)	0 - 3	September 3 • Commonwealth Stadium • 18,029; September 6 • Lockhart Stadium • 17,380

==== Conference Championship ====
Lower seed		Higher seed	Game 1	Game 2	Mini-game
San Diego Sockers	-	Fort Lauderdale Strikers	1–2	4–2	0–3	September 11 • San Diego Stadium • 27,635; September 13 • Lockhart Stadium • 18,420

==== Soccer Bowl '80 ====
September 21
12:44 pm EDT

New York Cosmos	3–0	Fort Lauderdale Strikers
Romero (Chinaglia, Bogićević) 47:55'; Chinaglia (Davis, Rijsbergen) 70:06'; Chinaglia (Cabañas) 87:07'

RFK Stadium, Washington, D.C.
Attendance: 50,768
Referee: Paul Avis

==== Bracket ====
Conference Quarterfinals
1	Chicago Sting	1	3	1(0)
16	San Diego Sockers	2	2	1(3)
8	Tampa Bay Rowdies	1	4	-
9	New England Tea Men	0	0	-
5	Edmonton Drillers	2	0	1
12	Houston Hurricane	1	1	0
4	Fort Lauderdale Strikers	2	0	0(3)
13	California Surf	1	2	0(2)
6	New York Cosmos	3	8	-
11	Tulsa Roughnecks	1	1	-
3	Dallas Tornado	1	2	-
14	Minnesota Kicks	0	0	-
7	Los Angeles Aztecs	0	1(5)	2
10	Washington Diplomats	1	1(4)	0
2	Seattle Sounders	2	3	-
15	Vancouver Whitecaps	1	1	-

Conference Semifinals
San Diego Sockers	6	0	1(2)
Tampa Bay Rowdies	3	6	1(0)
Edmonton Drillers	0	2(2)	0
Fort Lauderdale Strikers	1	2(1)	3
New York Cosmos	3	0	3
Dallas Tornado	2	3	0
Los Angeles Aztecs	3	0	1(2)
Seattle Sounders	0	4	1(0)

Conference Championships
San Diego Sockers	1	4	0
Fort Lauderdale Strikers	2	2	3
New York Cosmos	2	3	-
Los Angeles Aztecs	1	1	-

Soccer Bowl '80
Fort Lauderdale Strikers	0
New York Cosmos	3
