= 1979 Fort Lauderdale Strikers season =

Fort Lauderdale Strikers
1979 season
- Owner: (United States) Elizabeth Robbie
- General manager: (United States) Beau Rodgers
- Manager: (England) Ron Newman
- Stadium: Lockhart Stadium
- NASL: Eastern Division: Second place Quarterfinalist
- Top goalscorer: League: (West Germany) Gerd Müller (19 goals); All: (West Germany) Gerd Müller (19 goals)
- Average home league attendance: 13,774
Home colors	Away colors

The 1979 Fort Lauderdale Strikers season was the third season of the Fort Lauderdale Striker's team, and the club's thirteenth season in professional soccer. The Strikers finished the regular season in second place in the Eastern Division of the North American Soccer League's American Conference, and qualified for the playoffs. They were eliminated in the first round of the playoffs.

== Competitions ==
=== Friendlies ===
Date	Opponent	Venue	Result	Attendance	Scorers
February 18, 1979	FIU Sunblazers	A	0–3	1,100	Gary Jones (2), Tibor Gemeri
February 25, 1979	Washington Diplomats	H	0–1	616	
March 1, 1979	Atlanta Chiefs	A	2–3	1,049	Denny Vaninger, Nico Bodonczy, Tibor Gemeri
March 4, 1979	Memphis Rogues	H	4–1	771	David Irving, Gary Jones, Maurice Whittle, Nico Bodonczy
March 7, 1979	Washington Diplomats	A	3–0		(played in Santo Domingo) (Dominican Republic)
March 10, 1979	(Haiti) Haitian All-Stars	A	1–2		David Irving, Al Njie
March 12, 1979	(Haiti) Don Bosco FC	A	1–2		Nico Bodonczy, David Irving
March 14, 1979	Memphis Rogues	H	2–0	4,036	Nico Bodonczy, David Irving
March 17, 1979	Minnesota Kicks	H	1–0	4,931	Ray Hudson
May 2, 1979	Miami Hurricanes	A	0–12	1,068	Irving (3), Müller (2), Njie (2), Jones, Cubillas, Best, Ortiz-Valez, Bodonczy
May 23, 1979	(England) Crystal Palace F.C.	H	0–2	7,121	
September 14, 1979	Tampa Bay Rowdies	A	0–3	20,655	(Rodney Marsh testimonial game)
September 14, 1979	Miami Dade North Falcons	A	?		
October 2, 1979	FCI Miami	A	2–9		(exhibition vs. inmates)

=== NASL regular season ===
Regular season W = Wins, L = Losses, GF = Goals For, GA = Goals Against, BP = Bonus Points, Pts = Point System

6 points for a win, 1 point for a shootout win, 0 points for a loss, 1 point for each regulation goal scored up to three per game.

==== American Conference ====
Eastern Division	W	L	GF	GA	BP	Pts	Home	Road
Tampa Bay Rowdies	19	11	67	46	55	169	14-1	5-10
Fort Lauderdale Strikers	17	13	75	64	63	165	9-6	8-7
Philadelphia Fury	10	20	55	60	51	111	10-5	0-15
New England Tea Men	12	18	41	56	41	110	8-7	4-11

=== NASL Playoffs ===
==== First round ====
Lower seed		Higher seed	Game 1	Game 2	Mini-game	(lower seed hosts Game 1)
Chicago Sting	-	Fort Lauderdale Strikers	2–0	1–0	x	August 15 • Soldier Field • 10,019; August 18 • Lockhart Stadium • 13,691

==== Bracket ====
Conference Quarterfinals
1	Houston Hurricane	1	1	-
16	Philadelphia Fury	2	2	-
8	Tampa Bay Rowdies	3	3	-
9	Detroit Express	0	1	-
5	San Diego Sockers	4	7	-
12	California Surf	2	2	-
4	Fort Lauderdale Strikers	0	0	-
13	Chicago Sting	2	1	-
6	New York Cosmos	3	2	-
11	Toronto Blizzard	1	0	-
3	Minnesota Kicks	1	1	-
14	Tulsa Roughnecks	2	2	-
7	Vancouver Whitecaps	3	2	-
10	Dallas Tornado	2	1	-
2	Washington Diplomats	1	3	-
15	Los Angeles Aztecs	3	4	-

Conference Semifinals
Philadelphia Fury	2(0)	0	-
Tampa Bay Rowdies	3(2)	1	-
San Diego Sockers	2	1	-
Chicago Sting	0	0	-
New York Cosmos	0	3	3
Tulsa Roughnecks	3	0	1
Vancouver Whitecaps	2(1)	1	1
Los Angeles Aztecs	3(2)	0	0

Conference Championships
Tampa Bay Rowdies	1	3(3)	1
San Diego Sockers	2	2(0)	0
New York Cosmos	0	3(3)	0(2)
Vancouver Whitecaps	2	2(1)	1(3)

Soccer Bowl '79
Tampa Bay Rowdies	1
Vancouver Whitecaps	2

== See also ==
1979 Fort Lauderdale Strikers
