= 1981 Fort Lauderdale Strikers season =

Fort Lauderdale Strikers
1981 season
- Owner: (United States) Elizabeth Robbie
- General manager: (United States) Tim Robbie
- Manager: (Germany) Eckhard Krautzun
- Stadium: Lockhart Stadium
- NASL: Southern Division: Second place Semifinalist
- Top goalscorer: League: (Peru) Teófilo Cubillas (17 goals); All: (Peru) Teófilo Cubillas (19 goals)
- Average home league attendance: 13,345
Home colors	Away colors

The 1981 Fort Lauderdale Strikers season was the fifth season of the Fort Lauderdale Striker's team, and the club's fifteenth season in professional soccer. This year the team made it to semifinals of the North American Soccer League playoffs.

== Competitions ==
=== NASL Playoffs ===
==== First round ====
Lower seed		Higher seed	Game 1	Game 2	Game 3
Fort Lauderdale Strikers	-	Calgary Boomers	3–1	#2–0	x	August 23 • Lockhart Stadium • 12,196 #August 26 • Lockhart Stadium • 11,494

#Due to a scheduling conflict between the Calgary Boomers and the Billy Graham Crusade, the Fort Lauderdale Strikers hosted both Games 1 and 2 (instead of Game 1 only), there-by gaining home field advantage even though they were the lower seed.

==== Quarterfinals ====
Lower seed		Higher seed	Game 1	Game 2	Game 3
Fort Lauderdale Strikers	-	Minnesota Kicks	3–1	3–0	x	September 2 • Lockhart Stadium • 11,918; September 6 • Memorial Stadium • 10,278

==== Semifinals ====
Lower seed		Higher seed	Game 1	Game 2	Game 3
Fort Lauderdale Strikers	-	New York Cosmos	3–4	1–4	x	September 12 • Lockhart Stadium • 18,814; September 16 • Giants Stadium • 31,172

==== Bracket ====
First Round
3	Vancouver	0
14	Tampa Bay	2
6	Minnesota	2
11	Tulsa	0
8	Calgary	0
9	Fort Lauderdale	2
2	Chicago	2
15	Seattle	1
7	Los Angeles	1
10	Montreal	2
4	San Diego	2
13	Portland	1
5	Atlanta	0
12	Jacksonville	2

Quarterfinals
1	New York	2
14	Tampa Bay	1
6	Minnesota	0
9	Fort Lauderdale	2
2	Chicago	2
10	Montreal	1
4	San Diego	2
12	Jacksonville	1

Semifinals
1	New York	2
9	Fort Lauderdale	0
2	Chicago	2
4	San Diego	1

Soccer Bowl '81
1	New York	0
2	Chicago	1
