= Brilliant Orange =

2000 book by David Winner

Brilliant Orange: The Neurotic Genius of Dutch Football
- Author: David Winner
- Language: English
- Genre: football
- Published: 2000, Bloomsbury Publishing, London)
- Publication place: United Kingdom

Brilliant Orange: The Neurotic Genius of Dutch Football is a book by English writer David Winner, first published in 2000. It looks at the development of football in the Netherlands from the 1960s onwards, and at how the footballing culture reflected changes in wider Dutch culture. The book was shortlisted for the William Hill Sports Book of the Year in 2000.
