= Royal Cantabrian Football Federation =

- Abbreviation: RFCF
- Formation: 1923
- Purpose: Football Association
- Headquarters: Santander
- Location: Cantabria, Spain
- President: José Ángel Peláez
- Website: www.federacioncantabradefutbol.com

The Royal Cantabrian Football Federation (Spanish: Real Federación Cántabra de Fútbol; RFCF) is the body responsible for managing association football in the Cantabria autonomous community. Its offices are in Santander.

== History ==
The federation was officially created on 8 April 1923, after several reunions in the previous year to establish a regional championship happened. Domingo Solís was elected as its first president. The first regional championship took place during the 1922–23 season, with Racing de Santander being crowned champions.

== Competitions ==
The Royal Cantabrian Football Federation organises the following competitions:

- Tercera Federación, Group 3
- RFEF Cantabria tournament (Regional phase of the Federation Cup)
- Copa Cantabria Juvenil (Cantabria Youth Cup)
- Liga Cántabra Juvenil (Cantabria Youth League)
- Liga Cántabra Femenina (Cantabria Women's Football League)
- Copa Cantabria Femenina (Basque Women's Cup)

== See also ==
- Divisiones Regionales de Fútbol in Cantabria
- List of Spanish regional football federations
