= David Winner (writer) =

English writer and journalist

David Winner (born 5 December 1956) is an English writer and journalist. He lives in Kilburn, London.

His best-known books are Those Feet: An Intimate History of English Football (2005), and Brilliant Orange: The Neurotic Genius of Dutch Football (2000).

Brilliant Orange was shortlisted for the William Hill Sports Book of the Year in 2000. The book explains why the football players of the Netherlands play beautifully but lose their most important matches. Winner connects football to other elements of Dutch life and culture, such as their flat flooding-prone land, unusual taste in art, and their experiences in World War 2.

Around the World in 90 Minutes (plus extra time and penalties) (2007) was based on his journey to 13 countries during the four weeks of the 2006 World Cup.

His quirky travel book Al Dente: Madness, Beauty & the Food of Rome (2012) was described by Pen Vogler in The Observer, [Sunday 11 March 2012] as being "like a fusion of Coleridge's Table Talk and Marinetti's The Futurist Cookbook, peopled with eccentric film-makers, anorexic saints and wafer-making nuns".

He recently wrote a biography of footballer Dennis Bergkamp, co-written with Jaap Visser, and based on interviews with Bergkamp. The English edition, "Dennis Bergkamp, Stillness and Speed", was long-listed for the William Hill Sports Book of the Year 2013. The Dutch edition, published by Uitgeverij Carrera, is entitled "Dennis Bergkamp: de biografie".

He most recently was the ghostwriter of Rio Ferdinand's 2014 autobiography #2Sides.

Winner also co-wrote The Coming of The Greens (1988) (with Jonathon Porritt), a study of environmentalism in the United Kingdom and biographies for children of Archbishop Desmond Tutu, Raoul Wallenberg, Peter Benenson (founder of Amnesty International) and Eleanor Roosevelt.

He also translated a book about Johan Cruyff, The Netherlands best-ever footballer titled Ajax, Barcelona, Cruyff, The ABC of an Obstinate Maestro by Frits Barend and Henk van Dorp.

Winner supports Arsenal football club.
