= José Verduzco =

Mexican footballer (born 1990)

Personal information
- Full name: José Luis Verduzco Preciado
- Date of birth: 17 January 1990 (age 36)
- Place of birth: Colima, Colima, Mexico
- Height: 1.75 m (5 ft 9 in)
- Positions: Defender; midfielder

Senior career*
Years	Team	Apps	(Gls)
2011–2013	Guadalajara	2	(0)
2013–2016	Loros UdeC	68	(7)
- * Club domestic league appearances and goals

José Luis Verduzco Preciado (born 17 January 1990) is a Mexican former footballer who last played for Loros de la Universidad de Colima.

== Club career ==
=== Guadalajara ===
Verduzco was formed in C.D. Guadalajara's youth system. He made his professional debut on 2 September 2011 in a match against Club Tijuana. He is known for scoring the fourth goal in a friendly match against FC Barcelona during the 2011 World Football Challenge in which Guadalajara won by a score of 4–1.

=== Loros ===
After falling out of favor with Guadalajara, he was released from his contract. He joined Club Loros de la Universidad de Colima in 2013.
