= 2012–13 Real Madrid CF season =

109th season in existence of Real Madrid CF

Real Madrid
2012–13 season
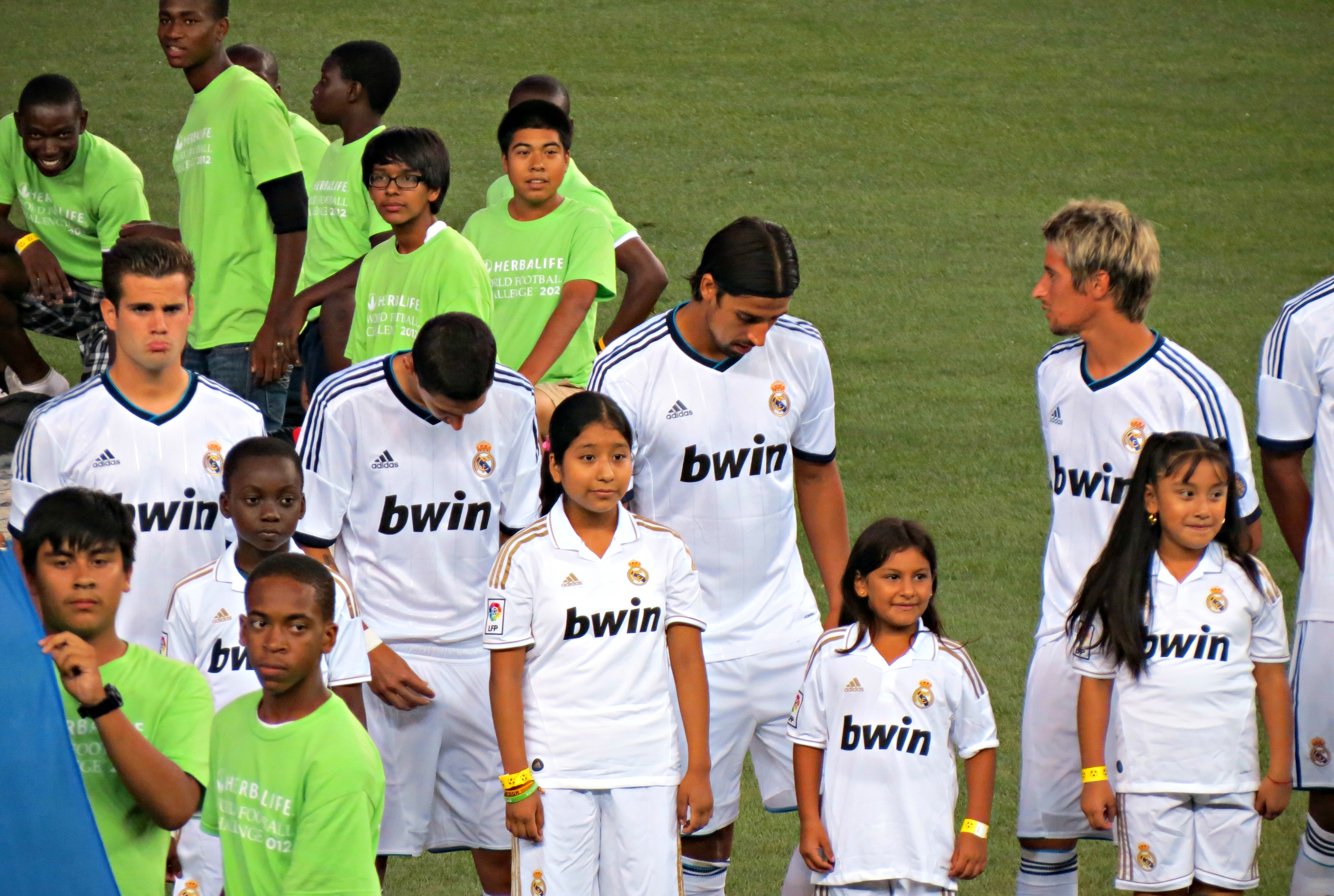
- Real Madrid players lining up during a World Football Challenge match against AC Milan in August 2012
- President: Florentino Pérez
- Head coach: José Mourinho
- Stadium: Santiago Bernabéu
- La Liga: 2nd
- Copa del Rey: Runners-up
- Supercopa de España: Winners
- UEFA Champions League: Semi-finals
- Top goalscorer: League: Cristiano Ronaldo (34); All: Cristiano Ronaldo (55)
- Highest home attendance: 83,500 (vs Barcelona, 2 March 2013)
- Lowest home attendance: 35,000 (vs Alcoyano, 27 November 2012)
- Average home league attendance: 74,678
- Biggest win: Mallorca 0–5 Real Madrid
- Biggest defeat: Dortmund 4–1 Real Madrid
Home colours	Away colours	Third colours

The 2012–13 season was the 109th season in Real Madrid Club de Fútbol's history and their 82nd consecutive season in La Liga, the top division of Spanish football. It covered a period from 1 July 2012 to 30 June 2013. Real Madrid began the season by winning the Supercopa de España, defeating Barcelona on away goals.

Real finished runners-up to Barça in La Liga, accumulating 85 points, and reached the semi-finals of the UEFA Champions League for the third year in a row, where they were eliminated by Borussia Dortmund 3–4 on aggregate. Madrid also entered the Copa del Rey in the round of 32, going on a memorable run to the final, which saw them defeat Barcelona in the semi-finals (including an emphatic 3–1 victory at Camp Nou) before losing to Atlético Madrid 1–2 a.e.t. in heartbreaking fashion, which meant that the team finished the season with one trophy out of four, despite being close to winning them all. Real Madrid faced the Blaugrana six times throughout the season, coming away with three wins, two draws, and one loss. A major transfer of the season was the signing of Luka Modrić from Tottenham Hotspur for a fee in the region of £33 million. After a loss to Atlético in the Copa del Rey final, Pérez announced the departure of José Mourinho at the end of the season by "mutual agreement".

== Club ==
=== Coaching staff ===
Position	Staff
Head coach	José Mourinho
Assistant coach	Aitor Karanka
Fitness trainer	Rui Faria
Goalkeepers coach	Silvino Louro
Technical assistant	José Morais
Match delegate	Chendo
Doctors	Juan Carlos Hernández, Alfonso del Corral
Physiotherapists	Álvaro Solano, Pedro Checa, Daniel Martínez, Juan Muro
Equipment managers	Manuel Fernández, Jorge Casabella, Manuel Ortega, Javier García

Source: Realmadrid.com

=== Other personnel ===
Position	Staff
President	Florentino Pérez
Honorary Life President	Alfredo Di Stéfano
1st Vice-president	Fernando Fernández Tapias
2nd Vice-president	Eduardo Fernández de Blas
Secretary of the Board	Enrique Sánchez González
Director General	José Ángel Sánchez
Director of the President's Office	Manuel Redondo
Director of the Foundation	Julio González
Director of the Social Area	José Luis Sánchez
Director of Protocol	Raúl Serrano
Director of Communications	Antonio Galeano
Director of Institutional Relations	Emilio Butragueño
Director of Control and Internal Auditing	Carlos Martínez
Director of First Team	Zinedine Zidane
Director of Human Resources	José María García
Director of the Legal Advisory Board	Javier López Farré
Director of Football	
Director of Economics	Julio Esquerdeiro
Director of Resources	Enrique Balboa
Director of Commercial Management	Begoña Sanz
Director of Operations and Services	Fernando Tormo

Source: Board of Directors, Organization

=== Grounds ===
Ground (capacity and dimensions)	Santiago Bernabéu (85,454 81,254 stadium & 4200 suites / 105x68m)
Training ground	Ciudad Real Madrid

=== Official sponsors ===
Bwin • Adidas • Mahou • Movistar • Audi • Emirates • Coca-Cola • STC • BBVA • Samsung • Sanitas • Nivea • Solán de Cabras • Solaria

Source: English, Spanish, Japanese

== Kits ==
Supplier: Adidas / Sponsor: bwin

Home	Away	Away alt.	Third	Goalkeeper 1	Goalkeeper 2	Goalkeeper 3

== Players ==
=== Squad information ===
N	Pos.	Nat.	Name	Age	EU	Since	App	Goals	Ends	Transfer fee	Notes
1	GK	(Spain)	Iker Casillas (captain)	32	EU	1999	654	0	2017	Youth system	
2	CB	(France)	Raphaël Varane	20	EU	2011	48	4	2017	€20M	
3	CB	(Portugal)	Pepe	30	EU	2007	199	5	2016	€30M	Second nationality: Brazil
4	CB	(Spain)	Sergio Ramos (vice-captain)	27	EU	2005	352	41	2017	€28M	
5	LB	(Portugal)	Fábio Coentrão	25	EU	2011	63	1	2017	€30M	
6	DM	(Germany)	Sami Khedira	26	EU	2010	126	8	2015	€12M	Second nationality: Tunisia
7	LW	(Portugal)	Cristiano Ronaldo	28	EU	2009	199	201	2015	€94M	
8	AM	(Brazil)	Kaká	31	EU	2009	119	29	2015	€65M	Second nationality: Italy
9	ST	(France)	Karim Benzema	25	EU	2009	183	87	2015	€35M	Second nationality: Algeria
10	AM	(Germany)	Mesut Özil	24	EU	2010	157	27	2016	€15M	
11	CB	(Portugal)	Ricardo Carvalho	35	EU	2010	77	3	2013	€8.5M	
12	LB	(Brazil)	Marcelo (vice-captain)	25	EU	2007 (Winter)	228	17	2018	€6.5M	Second nationality: Spain
13	GK	(Spain)	Antonio Adán	26	EU	2010	18	0	2014	Youth system	
14	CM	(Spain)	Xabi Alonso	31	EU	2009	192	6	2014	€30M	
15	DM	(Ghana)	Michael Essien	30	EU	2012	35	2	2013	N/A	Second nationality: France
17	RB	(Spain)	Álvaro Arbeloa	30	EU	2009	164	3	2016	€4.5M	Originally from youth system
18	CB	(Spain)	Raúl Albiol	27	EU	2009	118	2	2017	€15M	
19	CM	(Croatia)	Luka Modrić	27	EU	2012	53	4	2017	€30M	
20	ST	(Argentina)	Gonzalo Higuaín (vice-captain)	25	EU	2007 (Winter)	264	121	2016	€13M	Second nationality: France
21	RW	(Spain)	José Callejón	26	EU	2011	78	20	2016	€5M	Originally from youth system
22	RW	(Argentina)	Ángel Di María	25	Non-EU	2010	136	25	2018	€25M	
25	GK	(Spain)	Diego López	31	EU	2013 (Winter)	28	0	2017	€4M	Originally from youth system; No. 41 in UCL
27	CB	(Spain)	Nacho	23	EU	2012	16	0	2017	Youth system	#24 in UCL
29	ST	(Spain)	Álvaro Morata	20	EU	2012	18	2	2015	Youth system	
30	CM	(Spain)	Álex Fernández	20	EU	2012	2	0	2013	Youth system	Member of youth system
33	RB	(Brazil)	Fabinho	19	Non-EU	2013	1	0	2013	Youth system	Member of youth system
34	CM	(Spain)	José Rodríguez	18	EU	2012	4	1	2017	Youth system	Member of youth system
35	GK	(Spain)	Jesús Fernández	25	EU	2012	2	0	2013	Youth system	#25 in UCL
36	LW	(Russia)	Denis Cheryshev	22	EU	2012	1	0	2014	Youth system	Member of youth system; No. 23 in UCL
37	CB	(Spain)	Diego Llorente	20	EU	2013	1	0	2014	Youth system	Member of youth system
38	CM	(Brazil)	Casemiro	21	Non-EU	2013	1	0	2013	Youth system	Member of youth system; on loan from São Paulo
39	CM	(Spain)	Omar Mascarell	20	EU	2013	1	0	2013	Youth system	Member of youth system; second nationality: Equatorial Guinea

- Last updated: 1 June 2013
- Source: realmadrid.com, Wikipedia players' articles (for players' numbers, appearances, and goals)
- Ordered by squad number.

=== In ===
No.	Pos.	Nat.	Name	Age	EU	Moving from	Type	Transfer window	Ends	Transfer fee	Source
	CB	(Spain)	David Mateos	25	EU	Zaragoza	Loan return	Summer	2013	N/A	RealZaragoza.com
	DM	(Argentina)	Fernando Gago	26	EU	Roma (Italy)	Loan return	Summer	2013	N/A	ASRoma.it, RealMadrid.com
	LM	(Netherlands)	Royston Drenthe	25	EU	Everton (England)	Loan return	Summer	2012	N/A	EvertonFC.com, RealMadrid.com
29	ST	(Spain)	Álvaro Morata	19	EU	Youth system	Promoted	Summer	2015	N/A	RealMadrid.com
35	GK	(Spain)	Jesús Fernández	24	EU	Youth system	Promoted	Summer	2013	N/A	RealMadrid.com
19	CM	(Croatia)	Luka Modrić	26	EU	Tottenham Hotspur (England)	Transfer	Summer	2017	€30M	TottenhamHotspur.com, RealMadrid.com
15	DM	(Ghana)	Michael Essien	29	EU	Chelsea (England)	Loan	Summer	2013	N/A	ChelseaFC.com, RealMadrid.com
27	CB	(Spain)	Nacho	22	EU	Youth system	Promoted	Summer	2013	N/A	RealMadrid.com
25	GK	(Spain)	Diego López	31	EU	Sevilla	Transfer	Winter	2017	€4M	RealMadrid.com SevillaFC.es

Total expenditure: €34 million

=== Out ===
No.	Pos.	Nat.	Name	Age	EU	Moving to	Type	Transfer window	Transfer fee	Source
	CB	(Spain)	David Mateos	25	EU	Real Madrid Castilla	Demoted	Summer	Free	
	LM	(Netherlands)	Royston Drenthe	25	EU	Alania Vladikavkaz (Russia)	End of contract	Summer	Free	
16	RM	(Turkey)	Hamit Altıntop	29	EU	Galatasaray (Turkey)	Transfer	Summer	€3.5M	RealMadrid.com, Galatasaray.org
	DM	(Argentina)	Fernando Gago	26	EU	Valencia	Transfer	Summer	€3.5M	ValenciaCF.com, RealMadrid.com
	AM	(Spain)	Sergio Canales	21	EU	Valencia	Transfer	Summer	€8M	ValenciaCF.com, RealMadrid.com
15	CM	(Turkey)	Nuri Şahin	23	EU	Liverpool (England)	Loan	Summer	€5M	LiverpoolFC.com, RealMadrid.com
11	CM	(Spain)	Esteban Granero	25	EU	Queens Park Rangers (England)	Transfer	Summer	€8M	QPR.co.uk, RealMadrid.com
24	DM	(France)	Lassana Diarra	27	EU	Anzhi Makhachkala (Russia)	Transfer	Summer	€5M	RealMadrid.com
	CM	(Turkey)	Nuri Şahin	24	EU	Borussia Dortmund (Germany)	Loan	Winter	€1M	RealMadrid.com BVB.de

Total income: €34 million Net income: €0

== Pre-season and friendlies ==
Win Draw Loss

24 July 2012 Friendly	Real Oviedo	1–5	Real Madrid	Oviedo, Spain
19:45 CEST (UTC+02:00)	Diop 52'	Report	Vázquez 9'; Cheryshev 39'; Granero 41'; Di María 55', 73'	Stadium: Estadio Carlos Tartiere; Attendance: 12,000; Referee: José Ramón Alonso de la Lama (Asturias)

27 July 2012 Eusébio Cup	Benfica	5–2	Real Madrid	Lisbon, Portugal
19:00 WEST (UTC+01:00)	García 4'; Witsel 22'; Pérez 53', 85'; Martins 58'	Report	Callejón 18', 20'; Iván (yellow card) 45'; Granero (yellow card) 67'	Stadium: Estádio da Luz; Attendance: 35,476; Referee: Bruno Paixão (Portugal)
Note: Real Madrid did not wear a shirt sponsor.

2 August 2012 2012 WFC	LA Galaxy	1–5	Real Madrid	Carson, California, United States
19:30 PDT (UTC−07:00)	Lopes 23'	Report	Higuaín 2'; Di María 11'; Callejón 36'; Morata 49'; Jesé 84'	Stadium: The Home Depot Center; Attendance: 30,317; Referee: Ricardo Salazar (United States)

5 August 2012 2012 WFC	Santos Laguna	1–2	Real Madrid	Whitney, Nevada, United States
20:00 PDT (UTC−07:00)	Suárez 26'; Gomez (yellow card) 66'	Report	Alonso 14', (yellow card) 38'; Pepe (yellow card) 64'; Khedira 72'	Stadium: Sam Boyd Stadium; Attendance: 29,152; Referee: Baldomero Toledo (United States)

8 August 2012 2012 WFC	Milan	1–5	Real Madrid	New York City, United States
20:00 EDT (UTC−04:00)	Nocerino (yellow card) 27'; Robinho 33'; Boateng (yellow card) 55'	Report	Di María 24'; Ronaldo 49', 66'; Ramos 81'; Callejón 89'	Stadium: Yankee Stadium; Attendance: 49,474; Referee: Jair Marrufo (United States)

11 August 2012 2012 WFC	Celtic	0–2	Real Madrid	Philadelphia, Pennsylvania, United States
14:00 EDT (UTC−04:00)		Report	Callejón 22'; Ramos (yellow card) 42'; Benzema 67'	Stadium: Lincoln Financial Field; Attendance: 34,018; Referee: Sorin Stoica (United States)

26 September 2012 Bernabéu Trophy	Real Madrid	8–0	Millonarios	Madrid, Spain
20:30 CEST (UTC+02:00)	Kaká 14', 38', 60' (pen.); Callejón 23', 68'; Morata 31', 36'; Benzema 79'	Report		Stadium: Santiago Bernabéu; Attendance: 30,000; Referee: Carlos del Cerro Grande (Spain); Man of the Match: Kaká

Last updated: 26 September 2012
Sources: Real Oviedo, Benfica, LA Galaxy, Santos Laguna, Milan, Celtic, Millonarios

== Competitions ==
=== Supercopa de España ===
23 August 2012 First leg	Barcelona	3–2	Real Madrid	Barcelona
22:30 CEST (UTC+02:00)	Mascherano (yellow card) 45'; Pedro 56'; Messi 70' (pen.); Xavi 78'	Report	Alonso (yellow card) 11'; Arbeloa (yellow card) 44'; Albiol (yellow card) 50'; Ronaldo 55'; Di María 85'	Stadium: Camp Nou; Attendance: 91,728; Referee: Carlos Clos Gómez (Aragon); Man of the Match: Coentrão, Ronaldo
Note: Real Madrid head coach José Mourinho, Barcelona head coach Tito Vilanova, Mesut Özil, Marcelo, and David Villa were originally suspended for this match but were all pardoned by RFEF president Ángel María Villar.

29 August 2012 Second leg	Real Madrid	2–1 (4a–4 agg.)	Barcelona	Madrid
22:30 CEST (UTC+02:00)	Higuaín 11'; Ronaldo 19'; Pepe (yellow card) 20'; Arbeloa (yellow card) 38'; Khedira (yellow card) 63'; Alonso (yellow card) 73'	Report	Mascherano (yellow card) 14'; Adriano (red card) 28'; Messi 45'; Piqué (yellow card) 50'	Stadium: Santiago Bernabéu; Attendance: 83,000; Referee: Antonio Mateu Lahoz (Valencian Community); Man of the Match: Pepe, Ronaldo
Note: Real Madrid head coach José Mourinho was originally suspended for this match but was pardoned by RFEF president Ángel María Villar.

Last updated: 29 August 2012
Source: RealMadrid.com

=== La Liga ===
==== League table ====
Pos	Team	Pld	W	D	L	GF	GA	GD	Pts	Qualification or relegation
1	Barcelona (C)	38	32	4	2	115	40	+75	100	Qualification for the Champions League group stage
2	Real Madrid	38	26	7	5	103	42	+61	85	Qualification for the Champions League group stage
3	Atlético Madrid	38	23	7	8	65	31	+34	76	Qualification for the Champions League group stage
4	Real Sociedad	38	18	12	8	70	49	+21	66	Qualification for the Champions League play-off round
5	Valencia	38	19	8	11	67	54	+13	65	Qualification for the Europa League group stage (Note: Since the 2012–13 Copa del Rey champions Atlético Madrid and runners-up Real Madrid qualified for the 2013–14 UEFA Champions League, the 5th, 6th and 7th placed teams qualified for the group stage, play-off round, and third qualifying round of the 2013–14 UEFA Europa League respectively.)

Source: La Liga
Rules for classification: 1st points; 2nd head-to-head points; 3rd head-to-head goal difference; 4th goal difference; 5th number of goals scored; 7th Fair-play points
(C) Champions

==== Results by round ====
Round	1	2	3	4	5	6	7	8	9	10	11	12	13	14	15	16	17	18	19	20	21	22	23	24	25	26	27	28	29	30	31	32	33	34	35	36	37	38
Ground	H	A	H	A	A	H	A	H	A	H	A	H	A	H	A	H	A	H	A	A	H	A	H	H	A	H	A	H	A	H	A	H	A	H	A	H	A	H
Result	D	L	W	L	W	W	D	W	W	W	W	W	L	W	W	D	L	W	D	W	W	L	W	W	W	W	W	W	D	W	W	W	W	W	D	W	D	W
Position	9	14	9	12	7	6	5	4	4	3	3	3	3	3	3	3	3	3	3	3	3	3	3	3	3	3	2	2	2	2	2	2	2	2	2	2	2	2

Updated to match(es) played on 1 June 2013. Source: Competitive matches
A = Away; H = Home; W = Win; D = Draw; L = Loss

==== Matches ====
Win Draw Loss

19 August 2012 1	Real Madrid	1–1	Valencia	Madrid
19:00 CEST (UTC+02:00)	Higuaín 10'; Alonso (yellow card) 74'	Report	Feghouli (yellow card) 31'; Jonas 42'; Ruiz (yellow card) 50'; Pereira (yellow card) 84'; Piatti (yellow card) 87'	Stadium: Santiago Bernabéu; Attendance: 78,000; Referee: Carlos Delgado Ferreiro (Basque Country); Man of the Match: Di María, Higuaín

26 August 2012 2	Getafe	2–1	Real Madrid	Getafe
21:00 CEST (UTC+02:00)	Valera (yellow card) 44', (goal) 53'; Míchel (yellow card) 54'; Barrada 75'; X. Torres (yellow card) 89'	Report	Higuaín 27'; Albiol (yellow card) 75'; Coentrão (red card) 90+2'	Stadium: Coliseum Alfonso Pérez; Attendance: 13,000; Referee: Miguel Ángel Pérez Lasa (Basque Country)
Note: Fábio Coentrão was sent off for insulting the referee while an unused substitute.

2 September 2012 3	Real Madrid	3–0	Granada	Madrid
19:50 CEST (UTC+02:00)	Ronaldo 26', 53'; Pepe (yellow card) 39'; Arbeloa (yellow card) 69'; Higuaín 76'	Report	Gómez (yellow card) 13' (yellow-red card) 60'	Stadium: Santiago Bernabéu; Attendance: 70,000; Referee: José Luis González González (Castile and León); Man of the Match: Ronaldo, Alonso

15 September 2012 4	Sevilla	1–0	Real Madrid	Seville
22:00 CEST (UTC+02:00)	Trochowski 2'; Navarro (yellow card) 6'; Rakitić (yellow card) 44'; Luna (yellow card) 88'	Report	Higuaín (yellow card) 4'; Di María (yellow card) 28'; Pepe (yellow card) 40'	Stadium: Ramón Sánchez Pizjuán; Attendance: 51,000; Referee: Alberto Undiano Mallenco (Navarre)

24 September 2012 5	Rayo Vallecano	0–2	Real Madrid	Madrid
19:45 CEST (UTC+02:00)	Domínguez (yellow card) 42'; Casado (yellow card) 60' (yellow-red card) 90+3'; Amat (yellow card) 69'	Report	Essien (yellow card) 5'; Benzema 13'; Arbeloa (yellow card) 19'; Alonso (yellow card) 61'; Ronaldo 70' (pen.)	Stadium: Vallecas; Attendance: 15,000; Referee: David Fernández Borbalán (Andalusia); Man of the Match: Benzema, Di María
Note: Originally scheduled for 23 September but was postponed due to floodlight failure.

30 September 2012 6	Real Madrid	5–1	Deportivo La Coruña	Madrid
19:50 CEST (UTC+02:00)	Ronaldo 23' (pen.), 44', 84' (pen.); Özil (yellow card) 34'; Di María 38'; Modrić (yellow card) 50'; Pepe 66'	Report	Riki 16'; Manuel Pablo (yellow card) 23'; Evaldo (yellow card) 84'	Stadium: Santiago Bernabéu; Attendance: 71,000; Referee: Miguel Ángel Ayza Gámez (Valencian Community); Man of the Match: Ronaldo, Khedira

7 October 2012 7	Barcelona	2–2	Real Madrid	Barcelona
19:50 CEST (UTC+02:00)	Messi 31', 61'; Pedro (yellow card) 40'; Busquets (yellow card) 54'	Report	Ronaldo 23', 66'; Alonso (yellow card) 43'; Özil (yellow card) 57'; Pepe (yellow card) 78'; Arbeloa (yellow card) 90'	Stadium: Camp Nou; Attendance: 95,000; Referee: Carlos Delgado Ferreiro (Basque Country); Man of the Match: Ronaldo, Özil

20 October 2012 8	Real Madrid	2–0	Celta Vigo	Madrid
18:00 CEST (UTC+02:00)	Higuaín 11'; Alonso (yellow card) 53'; Ronaldo 67' (pen.); Casillas (yellow card) 69'; Ramos (yellow card) 77'	Report	Cabral (yellow card) 67'; Lago (yellow card) 78'	Stadium: Santiago Bernabéu; Attendance: 74,815; Referee: Carlos Clos Gómez (Aragon); Man of the Match: Higuaín, Essien

28 October 2012 9	Mallorca	0–5	Real Madrid	Palma
21:30 CET (UTC+01:00)	Bigas (yellow card) 54'; Conceição (yellow card) 57'	Report	Higuaín 8', 70'; Ronaldo 22', 73'; Modrić (yellow card) 24'; Alonso (yellow card) 68'; Callejón 90+1'	Stadium: Iberostar; Attendance: 15,790; Referee: José Luis González González (Castile and León); Man of the Match: Higuaín, Ronaldo

3 November 2012 10	Real Madrid	4–0	Zaragoza	Madrid
20:00 CET (UTC+01:00)	Higuaín 23'; Di María 25'; Modrić (yellow card) 37', (goal) 90+2'; Ramos (yellow card) 65'; Essien 89'	Report	Abraham (yellow card) 69'; Săpunaru (yellow card) 75'	Stadium: Santiago Bernabéu; Attendance: 67,216; Referee: Xavier Estrada Fernández (Catalonia); Man of the Match: Higuaín, Essien
Note: Head coach Manolo Jiménez was suspended for this match. Assistant coach Jesús Calderón managed Zaragoza in his place.

11 November 2012 11	Levante	1–2	Real Madrid	Valencia
21:30 CET (UTC+01:00)	Ballesteros (yellow card) 9'; Iborra (yellow card) 41'; El Zhar (yellow card) 44'; Juanlu (yellow card) 57'; Ángel 62'; Juanfran (yellow card) 71'; Ríos (yellow card) 87'	Report	Ronaldo (yellow card) 19', (goal) 21'; Morata 84'	Stadium: Ciutat de València; Attendance: 20,805; Referee: César Muñiz Fernández (Asturias); Man of the Match: Morata, Callejón
Note: Pedro Ríos was booked while an unused substitute.

17 November 2012 12	Real Madrid	5–1	Athletic Bilbao	Madrid
22:00 CET (UTC+01:00)	Aurtenetxe 12' (o.g.); Ramos 30', (yellow card) 75'; Benzema 32'; Özil 56'; Khedira 72'	Report	Ibai 42'; Aduriz (yellow card) 45+1'; Iturraspe (yellow card) 48'; Gurpegui (yellow card) 73'; Susaeta (yellow card) 86'	Stadium: Santiago Bernabéu; Attendance: 76,000; Referee: José Antonio Teixeira Vitienes (Cantabria); Man of the Match: Benzema, Ramos

24 November 2012 13	Real Betis	1–0	Real Madrid	Seville
22:00 CET (UTC+01:00)	Beñat 17', (yellow card) 77'; Sevilla (yellow card) 41'; Adrián (yellow card) 54'; Cañas (yellow card) 72'	Report	Pepe (yellow card) 56'; Ramos (yellow card) 71'	Stadium: Benito Villamarín; Attendance: 40,185; Referee: Jesús Gil Manzano (Extremadura)

1 December 2012 14	Real Madrid	2–0	Atlético Madrid	Madrid
22:00 CET (UTC+01:00)	Ronaldo 16'; Khedira (yellow card) 24'; Özil 66'	Report	Turan (yellow card) 15'; Juanfran (yellow card) 60'; Miranda (yellow card) 74'; Suárez (yellow card) 79'; Falcao (yellow card) 85'	Stadium: Santiago Bernabéu; Attendance: 83,000; Referee: Alberto Undiano Mallenco (Navarre); Man of the Match: Ronaldo, Alonso

8 December 2012 15	Real Valladolid	2–3	Real Madrid	Valladolid
20:00 CET (UTC+01:00)	Manucho 7', 22', (yellow card) 16'; Omar (yellow card) 53'; Óscar (yellow card) 83'	Report	Benzema 12'; Özil 45', 72', (yellow card) 82'; Ronaldo (yellow card) 69'; Di María (yellow card) 85'	Stadium: Estadio Nuevo José Zorrilla; Attendance: 25,000; Referee: Pedro Jesús Pérez Montero (Andalusia); Man of the Match: Özil, Benzema

16 December 2012 16	Real Madrid	2–2	Espanyol	Madrid
19:00 CET (UTC+01:00)	Ronaldo 45+1', (yellow card) 80'; Coentrão 48'; Alonso (yellow card) 70'	Report	Wakaso (yellow card) 13'; García 31'; Alfonso (yellow card) 61'; Sánchez (yellow card) 78'; Albín 88', (yellow card) 89'	Stadium: Santiago Bernabéu; Attendance: 65,000; Referee: Antonio Mateu Lahoz (Valencian Community)

22 December 2012 17	Málaga	3–2	Real Madrid	Málaga
20:00 CET (UTC+01:00)	Isco 49'; Santa Cruz 72', 76'; Joaquín (yellow card) 83'	Report	Ramos (yellow card) 29'; Sánchez 66' (o.g.); Ronaldo (yellow card) 70'; Pepe (yellow card) 80'; Benzema 82'; Khedira (yellow card) 90+2'	Stadium: La Rosaleda; Attendance: 30,000; Referee: Alejandro José Hernández Hernández (Canary Islands)

6 January 2013 18	Real Madrid	4–3	Real Sociedad	Madrid
17:00 CET (UTC+01:00)	Benzema 2'; Adán (red card) 6'; Khedira 35'; Ronaldo (yellow card) 44', (goal) 68', 70'; Alonso (yellow card) 70'	Report	Prieto 9' (pen.), 40', 76'; González (yellow card) 15'; Estrada (yellow card) 26' (yellow-red card) 79'; I. Martínez (yellow card) 41'; Zurutuza (yellow card) 51'; José Ángel (yellow card) 90+1'; Elustondo (yellow card) 90+2'	Stadium: Santiago Bernabéu; Attendance: 75,000; Referee: Ignacio Iglesias Villanueva (Galicia); Man of the Match: Ronaldo, Khedira

12 January 2013 19	Osasuna	0–0	Real Madrid	Pamplona
20:00 CET (UTC+01:00)	Rubén (yellow card) 12'; Oier (yellow card) 45'; Armenteros (yellow card) 57'; Lolo (yellow card) 90+1'	Report	Kaká (yellow card) 60' (yellow-red card) 76'; Alonso (yellow card) 69'; Özil (yellow card) 90+1'	Stadium: El Sadar; Attendance: 16,366; Referee: Carlos Clos Gómez (Aragon)

20 January 2013 20	Valencia	0–5	Real Madrid	Valencia
21:00 CET (UTC+01:00)	Jonas (yellow card) 24'; Gago (yellow card) 40'; Banega (yellow card) 63'	Report	Higuaín 9'; Arbeloa (yellow card) 19'; Coentrão (yellow card) 30'; Di María 34', 45', (yellow card) 53'; Ronaldo 36', 41'; Essien (yellow card) 81'	Stadium: Mestalla; Attendance: 40,000; Referee: José Antonio Teixeira Vitienes (Cantabria); Man of the Match: Di María, Ronaldo

27 January 2013 21	Real Madrid	4–0	Getafe	Madrid
12:00 CET (UTC+01:00)	Albiol (yellow card) 10'; Özil (yellow card) 27'; Ramos 53'; Ronaldo 62', 65', 72' (pen.)	Report	Sarabia (yellow card) 14'; M. Torres (yellow card) 19'; Gavilán (yellow card) 31'; Moyà (yellow card) 53'; Lopo (yellow card) 56'; Alexis (yellow card) 88'	Stadium: Santiago Bernabéu; Attendance: 71,108; Referee: José Luis González González (Castile and León); Man of the Match: Ronaldo, Ramos
Note: Luis García was suspended for this match. Assistant coach Pedro Rostoll Rodríguez managed Getafe in his place.

2 February 2013 22	Granada	1–0	Real Madrid	Granada
22:00 CET (UTC+01:00)	Ronaldo 22' (o.g.); López (yellow card) 34'; Ighalo (yellow card) 55'	Report	Alonso (yellow card) 55'; Modrić (yellow card) 65'; Marcelo (yellow card) 80'	Stadium: Los Cármenes; Attendance: 22,000; Referee: Antonio Mateu Lahoz (Valencian Community)

9 February 2013 23	Real Madrid	4–1	Sevilla	Madrid
22:00 CET (UTC+01:00)	Benzema 18'; Ronaldo 26', 46', 59'; Higuaín (yellow card) 39' (yellow-red card) 66'; Kaká (yellow card) 58'; Arbeloa (yellow card) 82'; Modrić (yellow card) 86'; Morata (yellow card) 88'	Report	Navas (yellow card) 42'; Maduro (yellow card) 64' (yellow-red card) 80'; Manu 87'	Stadium: Santiago Bernabéu; Attendance: 65,000; Referee: Carlos Delgado Ferreiro (Basque Country); Man of the Match: Ronaldo, Modrić

17 February 2013 24	Real Madrid	2–0	Rayo Vallecano	Madrid
19:00 CET (UTC+01:00)	Morata 3'; Ramos 12', (yellow card) 17' (yellow-red card) 18'; Ronaldo (yellow card) 63'; Pepe (yellow card) 76'	Report	Trashorras (yellow card) 33'; Bangoura (yellow card) 37'; Tito (yellow card) 42'; Jordi (yellow card) 49'	Stadium: Santiago Bernabéu; Attendance: 63,000; Referee: José Luis Paradas Romero (Andalusia); Man of the Match: Özil, Varane
Note: Paco Jémez was suspended for this match. Assistant coach Jesús Muñoz managed Rayo Vallecano in his place.

23 February 2013 25	Deportivo La Coruña	1–2	Real Madrid	A Coruña
20:00 CET (UTC+01:00)	Riki 35'; Pizzi (yellow card) 39'; Aguilar (yellow card) 62'; Ayoze (yellow card) 71'	Report	Carvalho (yellow card) 17'; Marcelo (yellow card) 54'; Callejón (yellow card) 66'; Kaká 73'; Higuaín 88'; Di María (yellow card) 90' (yellow-red card) 90+1'	Stadium: Riazor; Attendance: 30,000; Referee: Alfonso Javier Álvarez Izquierdo (Catalonia); Man of the Match: Kaká, Ronaldo

2 March 2013 26	Real Madrid	2–1	Barcelona	Madrid
16:00 CET (UTC+01:00)	Benzema 6'; Ramos (yellow card) 51', (goal) 82'; Coentrão (yellow card) 61'; Morata (yellow card) 68'; Arbeloa (yellow card) 90+2'	Report	Messi 18'; Alba (yellow card) 55'; Piqué (yellow card) 58'; Thiago (yellow card) 64'; Alves (yellow card) 90+1'; Iniesta (yellow card) 90+3'; Valdés (yellow card) 90+4' (red card) 90+4'	Stadium: Santiago Bernabéu; Attendance: 83,500; Referee: Miguel Ángel Pérez Lasa (Basque Country); Man of the Match: Modrić, Pepe
Note: Víctor Valdés was sent off after the match ended.

10 March 2013 27	Celta Vigo	1–2	Real Madrid	Vigo
19:00 CET (UTC+01:00)	De Lucas (yellow card) 30'; Aspas 63'; Varas (yellow card) 71'	Report	Albiol (yellow card) 42'; Ronaldo 61', 72' (pen.)	Stadium: Balaídos; Attendance: 25,344; Referee: Xavier Estrada Fernández (Catalonia); Man of the Match: Ronaldo, Kaká

16 March 2013 28	Real Madrid	5–2	Mallorca	Madrid
20:00 CET (UTC+01:00)	Higuaín 15', 57'; Ronaldo 52'; Modrić 54'; Benzema 90+2'	Report	Nsue 6'; Alfaro 21'; Tissone (yellow card) 39'	Stadium: Santiago Bernabéu; Attendance: 61,000; Referee: Antonio Mateu Lahoz (Valencian Community); Man of the Match: Higuaín, Modrić

30 March 2013 29	Zaragoza	1–1	Real Madrid	Zaragoza
20:00 CET (UTC+01:00)	Rodri 6', (yellow card) 59'; Loovens (yellow card) 12'; Álvaro (yellow card) 86'	Report	Modrić (yellow card) 11'; Ronaldo 38'; Arbeloa (yellow card) 56'; Ramos (yellow card) 72'	Stadium: La Romareda; Attendance: 30,000; Referee: Alberto Undiano Mallenco (Navarre); Man of the Match: Marcelo, Modrić

6 April 2013 30	Real Madrid	5–1	Levante	Madrid
18:00 CEST (UTC+02:00)	Higuaín 36'; Kaká 39' (pen.); Ramos (yellow card) 60'; Ronaldo 84'; Özil 87', 90+1'	Report	Míchel 31'	Stadium: Santiago Bernabéu; Attendance: 64,000; Referee: Carlos Clos Gómez (Aragon); Man of the Match: Higuaín, Özil

14 April 2013 31	Athletic Bilbao	0–3	Real Madrid	Bilbao
21:00 CEST (UTC+02:00)	Muniain (yellow card) 59'; Iturraspe (yellow card) 65'; Toquero (yellow card) 74'	Report	Ronaldo 2', 68'; Modrić (yellow card) 17'; Alonso (yellow card) 40'; Albiol (yellow card) 74'; Higuaín 76'	Stadium: San Mamés; Attendance: 40,000; Referee: Fernando Teixeira Vitienes (Cantabria); Man of the Match: Ronaldo, Alonso

20 April 2013 32	Real Madrid	3–1	Real Betis	Madrid
18:00 CEST (UTC+02:00)	Özil 45', 90'; Benzema 57'; Nacho (yellow card) 61'; Higuaín (yellow card) 78'; Ronaldo (yellow card) 81'	Report	Cañas (yellow card) 56'; Molina 73' (pen.)	Stadium: Santiago Bernabéu; Attendance: 75,000; Referee: Alfonso Javier Álvarez Izquierdo (Catalonia); Man of the Match: Özil, Benzema

27 April 2013 33	Atlético Madrid	1–2	Real Madrid	Madrid
20:00 CEST (UTC+02:00)	Falcao 4'; Filipe Luís (yellow card) 12'; Koke (yellow card) 24'; García (yellow card) 61'; Costa (yellow card) 74'	Report	Albiol (yellow card) 6'; Juanfran 13' (o.g.); Khedira (yellow card) 18'; Pepe (yellow card) 19'; Morata (yellow card) 41'; Di María 63'	Stadium: Vicente Calderón; Attendance: 53,000; Referee: Miguel Ángel Pérez Lasa (Basque Country); Man of the Match: Di María, Albiol

4 May 2013 34	Real Madrid	4–3	Real Valladolid	Madrid
20:00 CEST (UTC+02:00)	Di María 26'; Ronaldo 32', 70'; Khedira (yellow card) 44'; Kaká 49'	Report	Óscar 8'; Guerra 35'; Omar (yellow card) 38'; Pérez (yellow card) 63'; Sastre 87', (yellow card) 90+2'	Stadium: Santiago Bernabéu; Attendance: 68,000; Referee: David Fernández Borbalán (Andalusia); Man of the Match: Ronaldo, Di María

8 May 2013 36	Real Madrid	6–2	Málaga	Madrid
21:30 CEST (UTC+02:00)	Albiol 3'; Ronaldo 26', (yellow card) 80'; Özil 33'; Benzema 45+1'; Modrić 63'; Di María 90+1'	Report	Santa Cruz 15', (yellow card) 25'; Sánchez (red card) 21'; Antunes 36'; Demichelis (yellow card) 45+1' (yellow-red card) 73'; Iturra (yellow card) 80'	Stadium: Santiago Bernabéu; Attendance: 53,000; Referee: Jesús Gil Manzano (Extremadura); Man of the Match: Ronaldo, Özil
Note: The match was moved forward to accommodate the 2013 Copa del Rey Final.

11 May 2013 35	Espanyol	1–1	Real Madrid	Cornellà de Llobregat
22:00 CEST (UTC+02:00)	Stuani 23', (yellow card) 30'; Verdú (yellow card) 51'; Wakaso (yellow card) 62'; Forlín (yellow card) 80'; Sánchez (red card) 90+1'; Capdevila (yellow card) 90+2'	Report	Essien (yellow card) 42'; Higuaín 58'; Alonso (yellow card) 65'; Modrić (yellow card) 69'; Carvalho (yellow card) 71'; Albiol (yellow card) 76'; Ronaldo (yellow card) 80'	Stadium: Cornellà-El Prat; Attendance: 30,023; Referee: Ignacio Iglesias Villanueva (Galicia); Man of the Match: Nacho, Higuaín

26 May 2013 37	Real Sociedad	3–3	Real Madrid	San Sebastián
19:00 CEST (UTC+02:00)	Bergara (yellow card) 25'; Prieto 64' (pen.), 90+3'; Griezmann 78'	Report	Higuaín 6'; Essien (yellow card) 45'; Callejón 57'; Khedira (yellow card) 63', (goal) 80'	Stadium: Anoeta; Attendance: 30,586; Referee: José Luis González González (Castile and León); Man of the Match: Diego López, Higuaín

1 June 2013 38	Real Madrid	4–2	Osasuna	Madrid
17:00 CEST (UTC+02:00)	Higuaín 35', (yellow card) 44'; Essien 38'; Benzema 69'; Callejón 87'	Report	U. García (yellow card) 44'; Torres 52'; Cejudo 63'	Stadium: Santiago Bernabéu; Attendance: 55,000; Referee: Miguel Ángel Pérez Lasa (Basque Country); Man of the Match: Higuaín, Jesús

==== Results overview ====
Win Draw Loss

Region	Team	Home score	Away score
(Andalusia)	Granada	3–0	0–1
(Andalusia)	Málaga	6–2	2–3
(Andalusia)	Real Betis	3–1	0–1
(Andalusia)	Sevilla	4–1	0–1
(Community of Madrid)	Atlético Madrid	2–0	2–1
(Community of Madrid)	Getafe	4–0	1–2
(Community of Madrid)	Rayo Vallecano	2–0	2–0
(Basque Country (autonomous community))	Athletic Bilbao	5–1	3–0
(Basque Country (autonomous community))	Real Sociedad	4–3	3–3
(Valencian Community)	Levante	5–1	2–1
(Valencian Community)	Valencia	1–1	5–0
(Galicia (Spain))	Celta Vigo	2–0	2–1
(Galicia (Spain))	Deportivo La Coruña	5–1	2–1
(Catalonia)	Barcelona	2–1	2–2
(Catalonia)	Espanyol	2–2	1–1
(Aragon)	Zaragoza	4–0	1–1
(Balearic Islands)	Mallorca	5–2	5–0
(Castile and León)	Valladolid	4–3	3–2
(Navarre)	Osasuna	4–2	0–0

Last updated: 1 June 2013
Source: RealMadrid.com, LFP.es, LigaBBVA.com, RFEF.es

=== Copa del Rey ===
==== Round of 32 ====
31 October 2012 First leg	Alcoyano	1–4	Real Madrid	Alcoy
22:00 CET (UTC+01:00)	Lara 77'	Report	Varane (yellow card) 11'; Benzema 21', 88'; Kaká 35'; Álex (yellow card) 42'; Jo. Rodríguez 67'	Stadium: El Collao; Attendance: 6,000; Referee: Fernando Teixiera Vitienes (Cantabria); Man of the Match: Benzema, Kaká

27 November 2012 Second leg	Real Madrid	3–0 (7–1 agg.)	Alcoyano	Madrid
21:30 CET (UTC+01:00)	Carvalho (yellow card) 47'; Jo. Rodríguez (yellow card) 48'; Özil (yellow card) 52'; Di María 71', (yellow card) 85'; Callejón 89', 90+1'	Report	Arkaitz (yellow card) 42' (yellow-red card) 71'; Selvas (yellow card) 45+2'	Stadium: Santiago Bernabéu; Attendance: 35,000; Referee: Ignacio Iglesias Villanueva (Galicia); Man of the Match: Callejón

==== Round of 16 ====
12 December 2012 First leg	Celta Vigo	2–1	Real Madrid	Vigo
22:00 CET (UTC+01:00)	Krohn-Dehli (yellow card) 29'; Bermejo 56', (yellow card) 65'; Fernández (yellow card) 76'; Bustos 78'; De Lucas (yellow card) 90+4'	Report	Ronaldo (yellow card) 19', (goal) 86'	Stadium: Balaídos; Attendance: 30,000; Referee: Alfonso Álvarez Izquierdo (Catalonia)

9 January 2013 Second leg	Real Madrid	4–0 (5–2 agg.)	Celta Vigo	Madrid
21:30 CET (UTC+01:00)	Ronaldo 3', 24', 87'; Ramos (yellow card) 42' (yellow-red card) 72'; Arbeloa (yellow card) 42'; Khedira 89'	Report	Túñez (yellow card) 38'; Fernández (yellow card) 85'	Stadium: Santiago Bernabéu; Attendance: 60,600; Referee: Miguel Ángel Ayza Gámez (Valencian Community); Man of the Match: Ronaldo, Khedira

==== Quarter-finals ====
15 January 2013 First leg	Real Madrid	2–0	Valencia	Madrid
21:30 CET (UTC+01:00)	Benzema 37'; Albiol (yellow card) 70'; Guardado 73' (o.g.); Alonso (yellow card) 75'; Khedira (yellow card) 90+2'	Report	T. Costa (yellow card) 47'; Ruiz (yellow card) 68'; Soldado (yellow card) 74'	Stadium: Santiago Bernabéu; Attendance: 68,000; Referee: César Muñiz Fernández (Asturias); Man of the Match: Essien, Casillas
Note: Valencia head coach Ernesto Valverde was expelled in the 74th minute for protesting.

23 January 2013 Second leg	Valencia	1–1 (1–3 agg.)	Real Madrid	Valencia
21:30 CET (UTC+01:00)	Ruiz (yellow card) 40'; Pereira (yellow card) 43'; T. Costa (yellow card) 45+4', (goal) 52'; R. Costa (yellow card) 80'; Banega (yellow card) 90+3'	Report	Benzema 44'; Coentrão (yellow card) 45+1' (yellow-red card) 51'; Ronaldo (yellow card) 65'; Nacho (yellow card) 69'; Di María (red card) 88'; Modrić (yellow card) 90+2'	Stadium: Mestalla; Attendance: 40,000; Referee: Miguel Ángel Pérez Lasa (Basque Country)
Note: Ernesto Valverde was suspended for this match. Jon Aspiazu managed Valencia in his place.

==== Semi-finals ====
30 January 2013 First leg	Real Madrid	1–1	Barcelona	Madrid
21:00 CET (UTC+01:00)	Carvalho (yellow card) 16'; Callejón (yellow card) 42'; Varane 81'; Alonso (yellow card) 89'	Report	Piqué (yellow card) 1'; Fàbregas 50'; Alves (yellow card) 72'; Puyol (yellow card) 82'	Stadium: Santiago Bernabéu; Attendance: 83,000; Referee: Carlos Clos Gómez (Aragon); Man of the Match: Varane, Özil
Note: Tito Vilanova missed the match due to health problems. Assistant coach Jordi Roura managed Barcelona in his place.

26 February 2013 Second leg	Barcelona	1–3 (2–4 agg.)	Real Madrid	Barcelona
21:00 CET (UTC+01:00)	Piqué (yellow card) 12'; Puyol (yellow card) 40'; Alba 89'	Report	Ronaldo 13' (pen.), 57'; Arbeloa (yellow card) 38'; Varane 68'	Stadium: Camp Nou; Attendance: 95,002; Referee: Alberto Undiano Mallenco (Navarre); Man of the Match: Ronaldo, Varane
Note: Tito Vilanova missed the match due to health problems. Assistant coach Jordi Roura managed Barcelona in his place.

==== Final ====
17 May 2013 Final	Real Madrid	1–2 (a.e.t.)	Atlético Madrid	Madrid
21:30 CEST (UTC+02:00)	Ronaldo 14', (yellow card) 90+3' (red card) 114'; Coentrão (yellow card) 54'; Khedira (yellow card) 65'; Özil (yellow card) 72'; Ramos (yellow card) 74'; Essien (yellow card) 101'; Di María (yellow card) 119'	Report	Costa 35', (yellow card) 69'; Turan (yellow card) 37'; Miranda 98', (yellow card) 120+3'; Suárez (yellow card) 100'; Koke (yellow card) 105+1'; Gabi (yellow card) 114' (yellow-red card) 120+5'	Stadium: Santiago Bernabéu; Attendance: 85,000; Referee: Carlos Clos Gómez (Aragon)
Note: José Mourinho was expelled in the 76th minute for protesting.

Last updated: 17 May 2013
Source: RealMadrid.com, LFP.es

=== UEFA Champions League ===
==== Group stage ====
Pos	Team	Pld	W	D	L	GF	GA	GD	Pts	Qualification	DOR	RMA	AJX	MCI
1	(Germany) Borussia Dortmund	6	4	2	0	11	5	+6	14	Advance to knockout phase	—	2–1	1–0	1–0
2	(Spain) Real Madrid	6	3	2	1	15	9	+6	11	Advance to knockout phase	2–2	—	4–1	3–2
3	(Netherlands) Ajax	6	1	1	4	8	16	−8	4	Transfer to Europa League	1–4	1–4	—	3–1
4	(England) Manchester City	6	0	3	3	7	11	−4	3		1–1	1–1	2–2	—

Source: Soccerway

18 September 2012 1	Real Madrid (Spain)	3–2	(England) Manchester City	Madrid, Spain
20:45 CEST (UTC+02:00)	Marcelo 76'; Benzema 87'; Ronaldo 90'	Report	García (yellow card) 52'; Džeko 69', (yellow card) 89'; Kompany (yellow card) 70'; Kolarov 85'	Stadium: Santiago Bernabéu; Attendance: 70,381; Referee: Damir Skomina (Slovenia); Man of the Match: Y. Touré

3 October 2012 2	Ajax (Netherlands)	1–4	(Spain) Real Madrid	Amsterdam, Netherlands
20:45 CEST (UTC+02:00)	Moisander 56'	Report	Ronaldo 42', 79', 81'; Benzema 48'; Essien (yellow card) 58'	Stadium: Amsterdam Arena; Attendance: 49,491; Referee: Jonas Eriksson (Sweden); Man of the Match: Ronaldo
Note: Real Madrid did not wear a shirt sponsor in this match.

24 October 2012 3	Borussia Dortmund (Germany)	2–1	(Spain) Real Madrid	Dortmund, Germany
20:45 CEST (UTC+02:00)	Lewandowski 36'; Schmelzer 64'; Gündoğan (yellow card) 90+3'	Report	Ronaldo 38'; Ramos (yellow card) 47'; Alonso (yellow card) 62'	Stadium: Signal Iduna Park; Attendance: 65,829; Referee: Viktor Kassai (Hungary); Man of the Match: Kehl

6 November 2012 4	Real Madrid (Spain)	2–2	(Germany) Borussia Dortmund	Madrid, Spain
20:45 CET (UTC+01:00)	Pepe 34'; Özil 89'	Report	Reus 28'; Arbeloa 45' (o.g.); Großkreutz (yellow card) 57'; Hummels (yellow card) 66'	Stadium: Santiago Bernabéu; Attendance: 74,932; Referee: Cüneyt Çakır (Turkey); Man of the Match: Lewandowski

21 November 2012 5	Manchester City (England)	1–1	(Spain) Real Madrid	Manchester, England
20:45 CET (UTC+01:00)	Y. Touré (yellow card) 29'; Maicon (yellow card) 40'; Nasri (yellow card) 53'; Zabaleta (yellow card) 58'; Agüero 74' (pen.); García (yellow card) 90+5'	Report	Benzema 10'; Arbeloa (yellow card) 32' (yellow-red card) 73'; Alonso (yellow card) 48'; Ramos (yellow card) 61'	Stadium: Etihad Stadium; Attendance: 45,740; Referee: Gianluca Rocchi (Italy); Man of the Match: Silva

4 December 2012 6	Real Madrid (Spain)	4–1	(Netherlands) Ajax	Madrid, Spain
20:45 CET (UTC+01:00)	Ronaldo 13', (yellow card) 82'; Callejón 28', 88'; Kaká 49'; Carvalho (yellow card) 77'	Report	Boerrigter 59'	Stadium: Santiago Bernabéu; Attendance: 57,245; Referee: Pavel Královec (Czech Republic); Man of the Match: Modrić

==== Knockout phase ====
===== Round of 16 =====
13 February 2013 First leg	Real Madrid (Spain)	1–1	(England) Manchester United	Madrid, Spain
20:45 CET (UTC+01:00)	Ronaldo 30'	Report	Van Persie (yellow card) 6'; Welbeck 20'; Rafael (yellow card) 40'; Valencia (yellow card) 88'	Stadium: Santiago Bernabéu; Attendance: 80,529; Referee: Felix Brych (Germany); Man of the Match: De Gea

5 March 2013 Second leg	Manchester United (England)	1–2 (2–3 agg.)	(Spain) Real Madrid	Manchester, England
20:45 CET (UTC+01:00)	Evra (yellow card) 18'; Ramos 48' (o.g.); Nani (red card) 56'; Carrick (yellow card) 72'	Report	Arbeloa (yellow card) 38'; Modrić 66'; Ronaldo 69'; Kaká (yellow card) 73'; Pepe (yellow card) 88'	Stadium: Old Trafford; Attendance: 74,959; Referee: Cüneyt Çakır (Turkey); Man of the Match: Xabi Alonso

===== Quarter-finals =====
3 April 2013 First leg	Real Madrid (Spain)	3–0	(Turkey) Galatasaray	Madrid, Spain
20:45 CEST (UTC+02:00)	Ronaldo 9'; Benzema 29'; Higuaín 73'; Essien (yellow card) 84'; Alonso (yellow card) 84'; Ramos (yellow card) 90'; Modrić (yellow card) 90+2'	Report	Nounkeu (yellow card) 41'; Melo (yellow card) 71'; Drogba (yellow card) 74'; B. Yılmaz (yellow card) 78'	Stadium: Santiago Bernabéu; Attendance: 76,462; Referee: Svein Oddvar Moen (Norway); Man of the Match: Alonso

9 April 2013 Second leg	Galatasaray (Turkey)	3–2 (3–5 agg.)	(Spain) Real Madrid	Istanbul, Turkey
20:45 CEST (UTC+02:00)	Sneijder (yellow card) 20', (goal) 71'; Eboué (yellow card) 45', (goal) 57'; Drogba 72'; Amrabat (yellow card) 90+4'	Report	Ronaldo 8', 90+2'; Arbeloa (yellow card) 89' (yellow-red card) 90'	Stadium: Türk Telekom Arena; Attendance: 49,975; Referee: Stéphane Lannoy (France); Man of the Match: Sneijder
Note: Real Madrid did not wear a shirt sponsor due to gambling laws in Turkey.

===== Semi-finals =====
24 April 2013 First leg	Borussia Dortmund (Germany)	4–1	(Spain) Real Madrid	Dortmund, Germany
20:45 CEST (UTC+02:00)	Lewandowski 8', 50', 55', 66' (pen.), (yellow card) 70'	Report	Ronaldo 43'; Khedira (yellow card) 54'; Özil (yellow card) 64'; Ramos (yellow card) 90+2'	Stadium: Signal Iduna Park; Attendance: 65,829; Referee: Björn Kuipers (Netherlands); Man of the Match: Lewandowski

30 April 2013 Second leg	Real Madrid (Spain)	2–0 (3–4 agg.)	(Germany) Borussia Dortmund	Madrid, Spain
20:45 CEST (UTC+02:00)	Coentrão (yellow card) 26'; Higuaín (yellow card) 43'; Ramos (yellow card) 79', (goal) 88'; Khedira (yellow card) 81'; Benzema 82'	Report	Gündoğan (yellow card) 43'; Bender (yellow card) 45+1'; Weidenfeller (yellow card) 83'	Stadium: Santiago Bernabéu; Attendance: 80,429; Referee: Howard Webb (England); Man of the Match: Hummels

Last updated: 30 April 2013
Source: Matches

== Statistics ==
=== Players statistics ===
No.	Pos	Nat	Player	Total		La Liga		Champions League		Copa del Rey	
No.	Pos	Nat	Player	Apps	Goals	Apps	Goals	Apps	Goals	Apps	Goals
1	GK	(Spain) ESP	Iker Casillas	27	-25	19	-17	5	-8	3	0
17	DF	(Spain) ESP	Álvaro Arbeloa	39	0	25+1	0	6+1	0	5+1	0
3	DF	(Portugal) POR	Pepe	41	2	26+2	1	7+4	1	1+1	0
4	DF	(Spain) ESP	Sergio Ramos	38	5	26	4	9	1	3	0
5	DF	(Portugal) POR	Fábio Coentrão	29	1	16	1	8	0	3+2	0
19	MF	(Croatia) CRO	Luka Modrić	52	4	25+8	3	6+5	1	5+3	0
14	DM	(Spain) ESP	Xabi Alonso	45	0	22+6	0	10	0	7	0
22	MF	(Argentina) ARG	Ángel Di María	50	8	22+10	7	9+2	0	3+4	1
10	AM	(Germany) GER	Mesut Özil	50	10	23+9	9	8+2	1	7+1	0
7	FW	(Portugal) POR	Cristiano Ronaldo	53	53	30+4	34	12	12	7	7
9	FW	(France) FRA	Karim Benzema	48	20	19+11	11	6+4	5	7+1	4
25	GK	(Spain) ESP	Diego López	25	-33	16	-20	6	-9	3	-4
20	FW	(Argentina) ARG	Gonzalo Higuaín	42	17	19+9	16	6+3	1	1+4	0
6	DM	(Germany) GER	Sami Khedira	42	4	19+6	3	9+2	0	6	1
15	DM	(Ghana) GHA	Michael Essien	35	0	19+2	0	6+1	0	6+1	0
21	MF	(Spain) ESP	José Callejón	39	7	15+15	3	2+2	2	3+2	2
18	DF	(Spain) ESP	Raúl Albiol	25	1	14+4	1	0+2	0	5	0
12	DF	(Brazil) BRA	Marcelo	17	1	13+1	0	2	1	1	0
8	AM	(Brazil) BRA	Kaká	27	5	12+7	3	2+4	1	1+1	1
2	DF	(France) FRA	Raphaël Varane	33	2	12+3	0	10+1	0	6+1	2
11	DF	(Portugal) POR	Ricardo Carvalho	15	0	9	0	6	0		
27	DF	(Spain) ESP	Nacho	13	0	6+3	0	1	0	2+1	0
29	FW	(Spain) ESP	Álvaro Morata	15	2	5+7	2	0+1	0	2	0
13	GK	(Spain) ESP	Antonio Adán	8	-8	3	-3	1	-1	3+1	-4
24	DM	(France) FRA	Lassana Diarra	2	0	2	0				
38	DM	(Brazil) BRA	Casemiro	1	0	1	0				
35	GK	(Spain) ESP	Jesús Fernández	1	-2	1	-2				
34	DM	(Spain) ESP	José Rodríguez	4	1	0+1	0	0+1	0	1+1	1
33	DF	(Brazil) BRA	Fabinho	1	0	0+1	0				
39	AM	(Spain) ESP	Omar Mascarell	1	0	0+1	0				
37	DF	(Spain) ESP	Diego Llorente	1	0	0+1	0				
36	DF	(Russia) RUS	Denis Cheryshev	1	0	0	0	0	0	1	0
30	DM	(Spain) ESP	Álex Fernández	1	0	0	0	0+1	0		

- Source: https://www.bdfutbol.com/en/t/t2012-132.html

=== Minutes played ===
				Total				La Liga		Champions League		Copa del Rey		Others^{1}		
N	Pos.	Name	Nat.	GS	App	Gls	Min	App	Gls	App	Gls	App	Gls	App	Gls	Notes
1	GK	Iker Casillas	(Spain)	28	29		2640	19		5		3		2		
17	RB	Álvaro Arbeloa	(Spain)	38	41		3408	26		7		6		2		
3	CB	Pepe	(Portugal)	35	42	2	3415	28	1	11	1	2		1		
4	CB	Sergio Ramos	(Spain)	40	40	5	3705	26	4	9	1	3		2		
5	LB	Fábio Coentrão	(Portugal)	28	30	1	2557	16	1	8		5		1		
19	CM	Luka Modrić	(Croatia)	36	53	4	3430	33	3	11	1	8		1		
14	CM	Xabi Alonso	(Spain)	41	47		3979	28		10		7		2		
22	RW	Ángel Di María	(Argentina)	35	52	9	3327	32	7	11		7	1	2	1	
10	AM	Mesut Özil	(Germany)	40	52	10	3736	32	9	10	1	8		2		
7	LW	Cristiano Ronaldo	(Portugal)	51	55	55	4851	34	34	12	12	7	7	2	2	
9	ST	Karim Benzema	(France)	33	50	20	3043	30	11	10	5	8	4	2		
25	GK	Diego López	(Spain)	25	25		2396	16		6		3				
6	DM	Sami Khedira	(Germany)	36	44	4	3412	25	3	11		6	1	2		
15	DM	Michael Essien	(Ghana)	31	35	2	2826	21	2	7		7				
2	CB	Raphaël Varane	(France)	28	33	2	2755	15		11		7	2			
20	ST	Gonzalo Higuaín	(Argentina)	27	44	18	2618	28	16	9	1	5		2	1	
21	RW	José Callejón	(Spain)	21	41	7	2120	30	3	4	2	5	2	2		
18	CB	Raúl Albiol	(Spain)	20	26	1	2022	18	1	2		5		1		
11	CB	Ricardo Carvalho	(Portugal)	16	16		1505	9		1		6				
12	LB	Marcelo	(Brazil)	17	19	1	1440	14		2	1	1		2		
8	AM	Kaká	(Brazil)	15	26	5	1360	18	3	6	1	2	1			
27	LB	Nacho	(Spain)	9	13		911	9		1		3				
13	GK	Antonio Adán	(Spain)	7	8		649	3		1		4				
29	ST	Álvaro Morata	(Spain)	7	15	2	608	12	2	1		2				
34	CM	José Rodríguez	(Spain)	1	4	1	162	1		1		2	1			
38	CM	Casemiro	(Brazil)	1	1		95	1								
35	GK	Jesús Fernández	(Spain)	1	1		93	1								
36	LW	Denis Cheryshev	(Russia)	1	1		63					1				
30	CM	Álex Fernández	(Spain)	1	1		46					1				
33	RB	Fabinho	(Brazil)		1		17	1								
39	AM	Omar Mascarell	(Spain)		1		12	1								
37	CB	Diego Llorente	(Spain)		1		8	1								
24	DM	Lassana Diarra	(France)	2	2		124	2								Out on 31 August

Last updated: 1 June 2013
Source: Match reports in competitive matches, realmadrid.com, LFP.es, ESPN Soccernet
Ordered by start team and position on pitch (from back right to front left), minutes played, squad number
0 shown as blank
^{1} Other Competitions: Supercopa de España

=== Goals ===
Rank	Player	Position	La Liga	Champions League	Copa del Rey	Supercopa de España	Total
1	(Portugal) Cristiano Ronaldo	LW	34	12	7	2	55
2	(France) Karim Benzema	ST	11	5	4	0	20
3	(Argentina) Gonzalo Higuaín	ST	16	1	0	1	18
4	(Germany) Mesut Özil	AM	9	1	0	0	10
5	(Argentina) Ángel Di María	RW	7	0	1	1	9
6	(Spain) José Callejón	RW	3	2	2	0	7
7	(Spain) Sergio Ramos	CB	4	1	0	0	5
7	(Brazil) Kaká	AM	3	1	1	0	5
9	(Germany) Sami Khedira	DM	3	0	1	0	4
9	(Croatia) Luka Modrić	CM	3	1	0	0	4
11	(Spain) Álvaro Morata	ST	2	0	0	0	2
11	(Ghana) Michael Essien	DM	2	0	0	0	2
11	(Portugal) Pepe	CB	1	1	0	0	2
11	(France) Raphaël Varane	CB	0	0	2	0	2
15	(Portugal) Fábio Coentrão	LB	1	0	0	0	1
15	(Spain) Raúl Albiol	CB	1	0	0	0	1
15	(Brazil) Marcelo	LB	0	1	0	0	1
15	(Spain) José Rodríguez	CM	0	0	1	0	1
Own goals			3	0	1	0	4
Total			103	26	20	4	153

Last updated: 1 June 2013
Source: Match reports in Competitive matches

=== Disciplinary record ===
N	P	Nat.	Name	La Liga			Champions League			Copa del Rey			Supercopa de España			Total			Notes
N	P	Nat.	Name	Yellow card	Second yellow card	Red card	Yellow card	Second yellow card	Red card	Yellow card	Second yellow card	Red card	Yellow card	Second yellow card	Red card	Yellow card	Second yellow card	Red card	Notes
22	RW	(Argentina)	Ángel Di María	3	1					2		1				5	1	1	
5	LB	(Portugal)	Fábio Coentrão	2		1	1			1	1					4	1	1	
7	LW	(Portugal)	Cristiano Ronaldo	9			1			3		1				13		1	
13	GK	(Spain)	Antonio Adán			1												1	
4	CB	(Spain)	Sergio Ramos	8	1		5			1	1					14	2		
17	RB	(Spain)	Álvaro Arbeloa	7			1	2		2			2			12	2		
20	ST	(Argentina)	Gonzalo Higuaín	4	1		1									5	1		
8	AM	(Brazil)	Kaká	1	1		1									2	1		
14	CM	(Spain)	Xabi Alonso	11			3			2			2			18			
6	DM	(Germany)	Sami Khedira	5			2			2			1			10			
19	CM	(Croatia)	Luka Modrić	7			1			1						9			
3	CB	(Portugal)	Pepe	7			1						1			9			
18	CB	(Spain)	Raúl Albiol	6						1			1			8			
10	AM	(Germany)	Mesut Özil	5			1			2						8			
15	DM	(Ghana)	Michael Essien	4			2			1						7			
11	CB	(Portugal)	Ricardo Carvalho	2			1			2						5			
29	ST	(Spain)	Álvaro Morata	3												3			
12	LB	(Brazil)	Marcelo	2												2			
21	RW	(Spain)	José Callejón	1						1						2			
27	LB	(Spain)	Nacho	1						1						2			
1	GK	(Spain)	Iker Casillas	1												1			
2	CB	(France)	Raphaël Varane							1						1			
30	CM	(Spain)	Álex							1						1			
34	CM	(Spain)	José Rodríguez							1						1			

Last updated: 1 June 2013
Source: Competitive matches and ESPN.com
Ordered by (red card) , (second yellow card) and (yellow card)
(yellow card) = Number of bookings; (second yellow card) = Number of sending offs after a second yellow card; (red card) = Number of sending offs by a direct red card.

=== Start formations ===
Qnt	Formation	Matches			
Qnt	Formation	La Liga	Champions League	Copa del Rey	Supercopa de España
60	4–2–3–1	All matches	All other matches	All matches	All matches
1	4–3–3		2		

Last updated: 1 June 2013
Source: Match reports in Competitions
Only competitive matches.

=== Overall ===
	Total	Home	Away	Neutral
Games played	61	30	30	1
Games won	38	25	13	0
Games drawn	12	5	7	0
Games lost	11	0	10	1
Biggest win	5–0 vs Mallorca; 5–0 vs Valencia; 5–0 vs Levante	5–0 vs Levante	5–0 vs Mallorca; 5–0 vs Valencia	
Biggest loss	1–4 vs Borussia Dortmund		1–4 vs Borussia Dortmund	1–2 vs Atlético Madrid
Biggest win (League)	5–0 vs Mallorca; 5–0 vs Valencia	6–2 vs Málaga	5–0 vs Mallorca; 5–0 vs Valencia	–
Biggest win (Cup)	4–0 vs Celta Vigo	4–0 vs Celta Vigo	4–1 vs Alcoyano	
Biggest win (Europe)	4–1 vs Ajax; 4–1 vs Ajax; 3–0 vs Galatasaray	4–1 vs Ajax; 3–0 vs Galatasaray	4–1 vs Ajax	–
Biggest loss (League)	1–2 vs Getafe; 0–1 vs Sevilla; 0–1 vs Real Betis; 2–3 vs Málaga; 0–1 vs Granada		1–2 vs Getafe; 0–1 vs Sevilla; 0–1 vs Real Betis; 2–3 vs Málaga; 0–1 vs Granada	–
Biggest loss (Cup)	1–2 vs Celta Vigo; 1–2 vs Atlético Madrid		1–2 vs Celta Vigo	1–2 vs Atlético Madrid
Biggest loss (Europe)	1–4 vs Borussia Dortmund		1–4 vs Borussia Dortmund	–
Clean sheets	16	11	5	0
Goals scored	153	94	58	1
Goals conceded	72	29	41	2
Goal difference	+81	+65	+17	−1
Average GF per game	2.51	3.13	1.93	1
Average GA per game	1.18	0.97	1.37	2
Yellow cards	141	60	74	7
Red cards	12	4	7	1
Most appearances	(Portugal) Cristiano Ronaldo (55)	–		
Most minutes played	(Portugal) Cristiano Ronaldo (4851)	–		
Most goals	(Portugal) Cristiano Ronaldo (55)	–		
Most assists	(Germany) Mesut Özil (23)	–		
Points	126/183 (68.85%)	80/90 (88.89%)	46/90 (51.11%)	0/3 (0%)
Winning rate	62.3%	83.33%	43.33%	0/1 (0%)

Last updated: 1 June 2013
Source: Competitive matches

== See also ==
- 2012–13 La Liga
- 2012–13 Copa del Rey
- 2012 Supercopa de España
- 2012–13 UEFA Champions League
