= Gambling in Georgia =

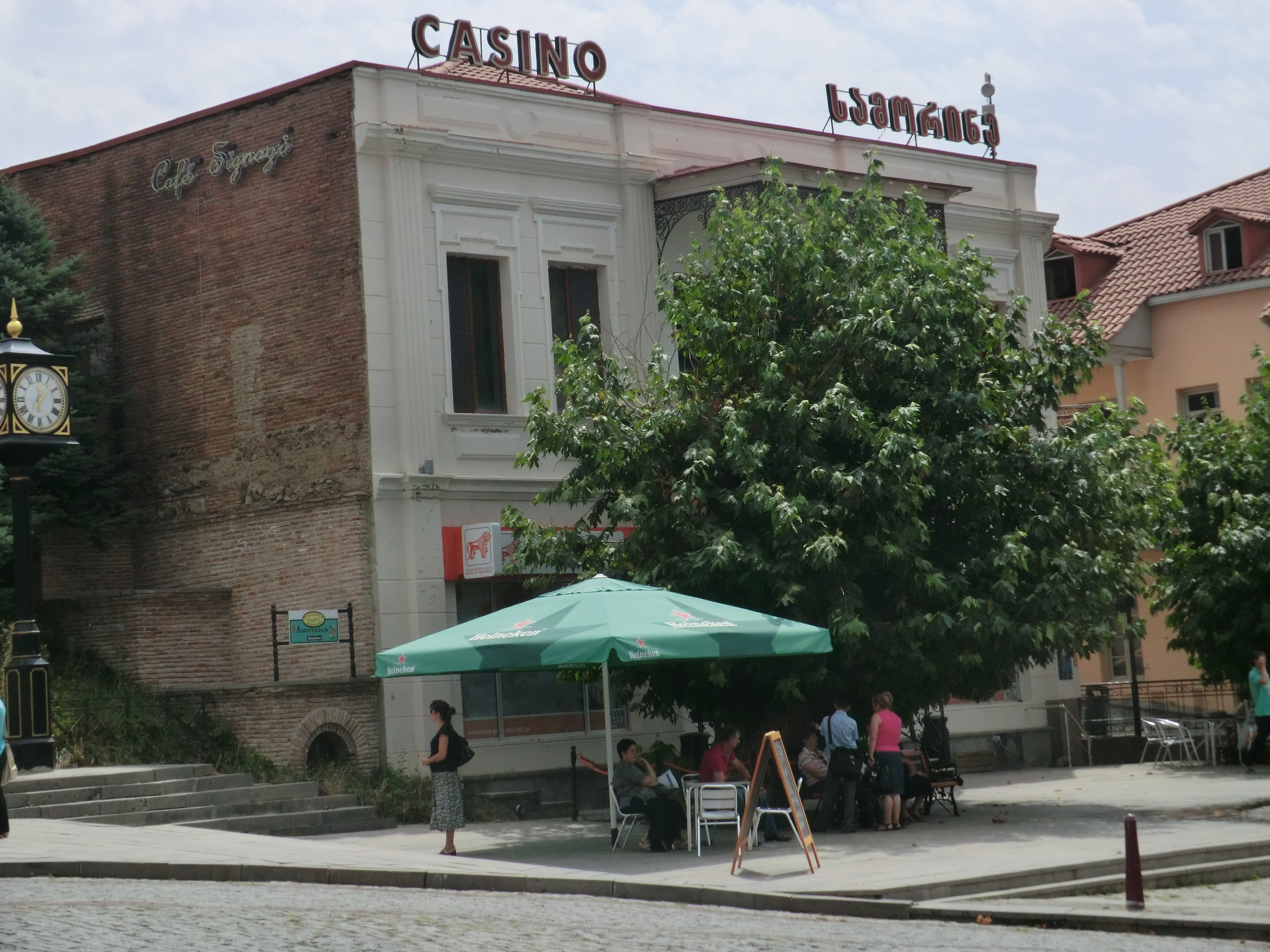
Casino in Sighnaghi

Gambling in Georgia has been legal since 1990 when gambling laws were liberalized in Georgia. However, before that there is a history of gambling facilities in Georgia dating back to 1921. Gambling was banned in Georgia during the Soviet era. In the 2000s, gambling experienced significant growth in Georgia. In 2013, a minimum of 1.4% of the State Budget for Georgia was from gambling sources; while in the late 2010s continuing on through the present, problem gambling has become a rather significant issue in Georgia.

== Types of facilities ==
There are seven different types of gambling facility in Georgia. These are: Casinos, slot clubs, totalisators, bonus lotteries, bingo halls, lottos, and gambling clubs. Of all those facilities, there are the most totalisators, with there being 93 facilities as of 2014. Casinos in Georgia are commercial casinos that have table games and almost all have slot machines as well. Slot clubs themseleves just have slot machines and do not have any table games.

== Locations of gambling facilities ==
Many of the gambling facilities in Georgia are in Tbilisi and Batumi. Much of the gambling in Batumi is targeted towards Turkish tourists, due to Batumi's relative proximity to Turkey, and that gambling in Turkey is mostly illegal. Some of the casinos in Batumi have Turkish flags outside of them, with over 750,000 Turkish tourists alone visiting Batumi in 2011. Licensing fees vary depending upon where casinos are to be opened ranging from being exempt from payment of fees in Kazbegi Municipality, Tskaltubo Municipality, Signagi Municipality, Bakuriani, and Gudauri to ₾100,000 in Akhaltsikhe Municipality to ₾5,000,000 in Tbilisi.

== Problem gambling and legislative response ==
There has been an uptick in problem gambling in Georgia, with a study finding that in 2021, 12% of high school students were described as problem gamblers. This led the government to introduce new regulations in 2021 that go into effect in stages being fully in effect on 1 July 2024 that create far more stringent laws around gambling. The new laws will raise the online gambling age and casino age for Georgian citizens, which was previously at 18 and 21 respectively, to 25. It also restricts those that are on government assistance and those who are employed by the government. There has also been a creation of a exclusion list that can either be voluntary self-exclusion or one can be excluded based on a request from a family member and a finding from a court after said request that one has a gambling addiction.
