= 2012 World Football Challenge =

Tournament details
- Country: Canada; United States
- Venues: 8 (in 8 host cities)
- Teams: 11 (from 2 confederations)

Final positions
- Champions: (Spain) Real Madrid
- Runners-up: n/a

Tournament statistics
- Matches played: 9
- Goals scored: 30 (3.33 per match)
- Attendance: 304,285 (33,809 per match)
- Top goal scorer(s): (Spain) José Callejón (3 goals)

The 2012 World Football Challenge was the third (and the final) World Football Challenge event, a series of friendly soccer matches played in Canada and the United States in July and August. The series opened on July 18. The opening match was between the Seattle Sounders FC of Major League Soccer (MLS) and Chelsea of the English Premier League, which Chelsea won 4–2. Real Madrid, who had won the equivalent tournament the previous year, were the only team to win all their matches in normal play.

== Participants ==
The following eleven clubs took part in the 2012 World Football Challenge.

Nation	Team	Location	Confederation	Professional League	Notes
Scotland	Celtic	Glasgow	UEFA	Scottish Premier League	2011–12 Scottish Premier League champions
England	Chelsea	London	UEFA	Premier League	2012 FA Cup and 2011–12 UEFA Champions League winners
United States	D.C. United	Washington, D.C.	CONCACAF	Major League Soccer	4-time MLS Cup Champions
England	Liverpool	Liverpool	UEFA	Premier League	2012 Football League Cup winners
United States	Los Angeles Galaxy	Los Angeles	CONCACAF	Major League Soccer	2011 MLS Cup champions
Italy	Milan	Milan	UEFA	Serie A	18-time Serie A champions
France	Paris Saint-Germain	Paris	UEFA	Ligue 1	Ligue 1 runners-up
Spain	Real Madrid	Madrid	UEFA	La Liga	2011–12 La Liga champions
Mexico	Santos Laguna	Torreón	CONCACAF	Primera División	2011–12 Mexican Primera División Clausura champions
United States	Seattle Sounders FC	Seattle	CONCACAF	Major League Soccer	2011 U.S. Open Cup winners
Canada	Toronto FC	Toronto	CONCACAF	Major League Soccer	2012 Canadian Championship champions

== Venues ==
Eight venues were selected for the 2012 World Football Challenge.

Canada

Toronto, Ontario	Location of the host cities of the 2012 World Football Challenge in Canada.
Rogers Centre	Location of the host cities of the 2012 World Football Challenge in Canada.
Capacity: 49,808	Location of the host cities of the 2012 World Football Challenge in Canada.

United States

Carson, California	Miami Gardens, Florida	Whitney, Nevada	New York, New York
The Home Depot Center	Sun Life Stadium	Sam Boyd Stadium	Yankee Stadium
Capacity: 27,000	Capacity: 74,918	Capacity: 36,800	Capacity: 52,325
Location of the host cities of the 2012 World Football Challenge in the United States.
Philadelphia, Pennsylvania	Seattle, Washington	Washington, D.C.	
Lincoln Financial Field	CenturyLink Field	RFK Stadium	
Capacity: 67,594	Capacity: 67,000	Capacity: 56,692	

== Matches ==
All times are in the EDT time zone (UTC-4) (Local Times in parentheses).

July 18
21:30 (18:30 UTC-7)

Seattle Sounders FC (United States)	2–4	(England) Chelsea
Montero 14', 32'	Report	Lukaku 3', 44'; Hazard 11'; Marin 40'

CenturyLink Field, Seattle, Washington
Attendance: 53,309
Referee: Ricardo Salazar (California)

July 21
16:00 (16:00 UTC-4)

Toronto FC (Canada)	1–1	(England) Liverpool
Amarikwa 58'	Report	Morgan 69'

Rogers Centre, Toronto, Ontario
Attendance: 33,087
Referee: Paul Ward (Vancouver)

July 22
19:00 (19:00 UTC-4)

Chelsea (England)	1–1	(France) Paris Saint-Germain
Piazon 82'	Report	Nenê 30'

Yankee Stadium, New York, New York
Attendance: 38,202
Referee: Edvin Jurisevic (Nebraska)

July 28
18:00 (18:00 UTC-4)

Chelsea (England)	0–1	(Italy) Milan
	Report	Emanuelson 68'

Sun Life Stadium, Miami Gardens, Florida
Attendance: 57,748
Referee: Ricardo Salazar (California)

July 28
19:30 (19:30 UTC-4)

D.C. United (United States)	1–1	(France) Paris Saint-Germain
De Rosario 33' (pen.)	Report	Ibrahimović 3'

RFK Stadium, Washington, D.C.
Attendance: 13,176
Referee: John McCloskey (Delaware)

August 2
22:30 (19:30 UTC-7)

Los Angeles Galaxy (United States)	1–5	(Spain) Real Madrid
Lopes 23'	Report	Higuaín 2'; Di María 11'; Callejón 36'; Morata 49'; Jesé 84'

The Home Depot Center, Carson, California
Attendance: 30,317
Referee: Ricardo Salazar (California)

August 5
23:00 (20:00 UTC-7)

Real Madrid (Spain)	2–1	(Mexico) Santos Laguna
Alonso 14'; Khedira 72'	Report	Suárez 25'

Sam Boyd Stadium, Whitney, Nevada
Attendance: 29,152
Referee: Baldomero Toledo (California)

August 8
20:00 (20:00 UTC-4)

Real Madrid (Spain)	5–1	(Italy) Milan
Di María 24'; Ronaldo 49', 66'; Ramos 81'; Callejón 89'	Report	Robinho 33'

Yankee Stadium, New York, New York
Attendance: 49,474
Referee: Jair Marrufo (Texas)

August 11
13:30 (13:30 UTC-4)

Real Madrid (Spain)	2–0	(Scotland) Celtic
Callejón 22'; Benzema 67'	Report

Lincoln Financial Field, Philadelphia, Pennsylvania
Attendance: 34,018
Referee: Sorin Stoica

== Results ==
Team	Pld	W	D	L	GF	GA
(Scotland) Celtic	1	0	0	1	0	2
(England) Chelsea	3	1	1	1	5	4
(United States) D.C. United	1	0	1	0	1	1
(England) Liverpool	1	0	1	0	1	1
(United States) Los Angeles Galaxy	1	0	0	1	1	5
(Italy) Milan	2	1	0	1	2	5
(France) Paris Saint-Germain	2	0	2	0	2	2
(Spain) Real Madrid	4	4	0	0	14	3
(Mexico) Santos Laguna	1	0	0	1	1	2
(United States) Seattle Sounders FC	1	0	0	1	2	4
(Canada) Toronto FC	1	0	1	0	1	1

== Top goalscorers ==
As of August 11, 2012.

Rank	Name	Team	Goals
1	(Spain) José Callejón	Real Madrid	3
2	(Belgium) Romelu Lukaku	Chelsea	2
2	(Argentina) Ángel Di María	Real Madrid	2
2	(Colombia) Fredy Montero	Seattle Sounders FC	2
2	(Portugal) Cristiano Ronaldo	Real Madrid	2
6	(Spain) Xabi Alonso	Real Madrid	1
6	(United States) Quincy Amarikwa	Toronto FC	1
6	(France) Karim Benzema	Real Madrid	1
6	(Netherlands) Urby Emanuelson	Milan	1
6	(Belgium) Eden Hazard	Chelsea	1
6	(Argentina) Gonzalo Higuaín	Real Madrid	1
6	(Sweden) Zlatan Ibrahimović	Paris Saint-Germain	1
6	(Spain) Jesé	Real Madrid	1
6	(Germany) Sami Khedira	Real Madrid	1
6	(Brazil) David Lopes	Los Angeles Galaxy	1
6	(Germany) Marko Marin	Chelsea	1
6	(Spain) Álvaro Morata	Real Madrid	1
6	(England) Adam Morgan	Liverpool	1
6	(Brazil) Nenê	Paris Saint-Germain	1
6	(Brazil) Lucas Piazon	Chelsea	1
6	(Spain) Sergio Ramos	Real Madrid	1
6	(Brazil) Robinho	Milan	1
6	(Canada) Dwayne De Rosario	D.C. United	1
6	(Ecuador) Christian Suárez	Santos Laguna	1
