= Millî Piyango İdaresi =

Turkish national lottery body

- Region: Turkey; Northern Cyprus
- Shown on: MPI website
- Website: www.mpi.gov.tr

Millî Piyango İdaresi (MPI, English: National Lottery Administration) is the Turkish national lottery body.

Established on 1 June 1939, it operates a variety of games besides the main Millî Piyango, including Sayısal Loto (6/49), Süper Loto (6/54), Şans Topu (5/34 + 1/14), and On Numara (22/80).

An attempt to privatise it was cancelled in 2008 after bidders failed to meet the government's $1.6bn valuation.

Milli Piyango has arranged some sports sponsorship, including of the Maliye Milli Piyango SK and Milli Piyango Curling Arena.
