= Gambling in Turkey =

Overview of gambling in the Republic of Turkey

Grand National Assembly of Turkey

Related legislation
- Lottery (Milli Piyango), State betting (IDDAA)

Gambling in Turkey is highly regulated. Turkey banned casinos in 1998, and it banned non-state online gambling in 2006. A state lottery (Milli Piyango) and betting services exists, however, and has some online gambling, and illegal gambling continues to persist.

== History ==
Gambling horses were originally legalised in 1984, and casinos in 1990. New restrictions were introduced in September 1996, including limiting opening hours to 8 hours per day and requiring winnings to be paid by cheque. These followed the July 1996 assassination of "casino king" Ömer Lütfü Topal. A law banning casinos (partly because of accusations of money-laundering) was unexpectedly announced and approved in December 1996 and (following legal action against it) took effect on 11 February 1998. However, illegal casinos continue to exist. At the time of the ban casinos were a $1bn industry employing around 20,000 people. Sudi Özkan, another "casino king" with 20 casinos, left the country for a time, after the Ministry of Treasury and Finance found that he allegedly siphoned nearly $700m to Switzerland "off the books," eventually returning under a tax amnesty offered by Turkish authorities.

Online gambling was banned in 2006, but the measures to ban it have had limited success. In 2009 it was estimated that a quarter of Swedish firm Betsson's revenues came from Turkey. In 2013 the Turkish Parliament planned to increase penalties for those using online gambling as well as those enabling financial transactions in relation to online gambling.

== Online gambling ==
Online gambling in Turkey is currently prohibited, with the exception of the state-owned sports betting company, IDDAA, which is the only Turkish entity that is allowed to offer internet gambling services. The law that prohibits online gambling in Turkey was passed in 2007 and recently, Turkey has also been taking measures to prevent players from using foreign internet gambling websites as well. Despite the ban on gambling, many Turkish players continue to bet on online gambling sites and are recognized as leading gamblers. In 2013 Turkish government issued the law by which Turkey has become the first country in the world to target individual players instead of gambling operators. Sanctions for anyone caught in Turkey to access online gambling services is a penalty of between £100 and £500 (about $55–278). Casino operators dealing with the Turkish market and bankers serving them can also face the prison conditions at the same time.
