= Sami Khedira =

German footballer (born 1987)

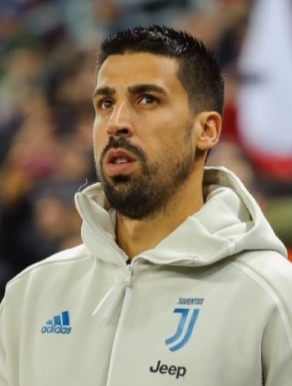
- Khedira in 2020

Personal information
- Full name: Sami Khedira
- Date of birth: 4 April 1987 (age 39)
- Place of birth: Stuttgart, West Germany
- Height: 1.89 m (6 ft 2 in)
- Position: Central midfielder

Team information
- Current team: Real Madrid (assistant coach)

Youth career
- 1992–1995: TV Oeffingen
- 1995–2004: VfB Stuttgart

Senior career*
Years	Team	Apps	(Gls)
2004–2006	VfB Stuttgart II	21	(1)
2006–2010	VfB Stuttgart	98	(14)
2010–2015	Real Madrid	102	(6)
2015–2021	Juventus	99	(21)
2021	Hertha BSC	9	(0)
Total		329	(42)

International career
2003–2004	Germany U17	10	(2)
2007–2009	Germany U21	15	(5)
2009–2018	Germany	77	(7)
Medal record
Men's football
Representing Germany
FIFA World Cup
Winner	2014 Brazil	Team
Bronze medal – third place	2010 South Africa	Team
UEFA European Championship
Bronze medal – third place	2012 Poland-Ukraine	Team
UEFA European Under-21 Championship
Winner	2009 Sweden	Team
- * Club domestic league appearances and goals

Sami Khedira (German: [ˈsaːmiː 'kɛdiːʁaː]; Arabic: سامي خضيرة; born 4 April 1987) is a German former professional footballer who played as a central midfielder. He is currently the assistant coach of La Liga club Real Madrid.

Khedira began his career at VfB Stuttgart, winning the Bundesliga in 2007, before moving to Real Madrid in 2010. In his five seasons in Spain, he won seven domestic and international trophies, including the UEFA Champions League in 2014. In 2015, he moved to Serie A club Juventus on a free transfer, and won the Serie A title and Coppa Italia in his first three seasons with the club, followed by two more league titles and a Supercoppa Italiana.

A full international for Germany since 2009, Khedira earned 77 caps for the national team. He has taken part at three FIFA World Cups and two UEFA European Championships with Germany, and was part of their squads which reached the semi-finals at the 2010 FIFA World Cup, as well as the 2012 and 2016 UEFA European Football Championships; he also won the 2014 FIFA World Cup.

== Club career ==
=== VfB Stuttgart ===
Before joining the youth team of VfB Stuttgart in 1995, he played at TV Oeffingen. In the first months of the 2006–07 season, he was called up into VfB's Bundesliga squad by manager Armin Veh. His debut followed on 1 October 2006 against Hertha BSC, replacing Antônio da Silva at the end of the 2–2 away draw. He scored his first two goals on 29 October in the 3–0 win against Schalke 04 at the Mercedes-Benz Arena. On 29 January 2007 he signed his first professional contract at VfB, valid until June 2009. In the last game of the season on 19 May, Khedira scored the winner as Die Schwaben came from behind to defeat Energie Cottbus 2–1 and became champions for the first time in 15 years.

On 9 July 2008, he extended his contract until the summer of 2011. In the ensuing season, he scored a career-best 7 league goals in 27 games, including both in a 2–2 draw against Bayern Munich on 13 December.

=== Real Madrid ===
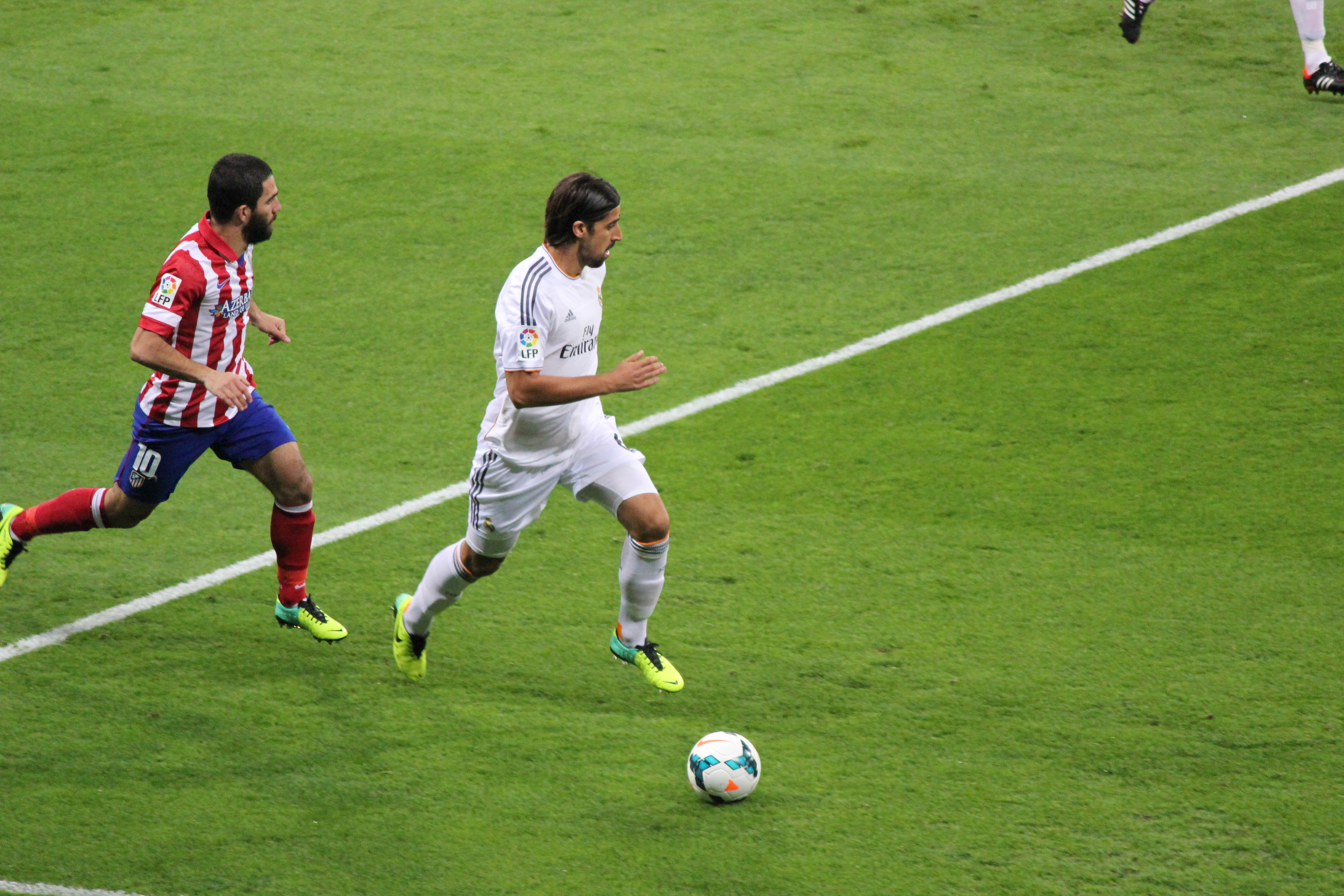
Khedira running past Atlético Madrid's Arda Turan in the Madrid derby in September 2013

On 30 July 2010, Khedira moved to La Liga club Real Madrid after 98 Bundesliga appearances for an undisclosed fee, signing a contract until 2015. Khedira made his debut on 13 August in a friendly match against Bayern Munich, which Real Madrid won 4–2 on penalties for the Franz-Beckenbauer-Cup. His league debut came sixteen days later, in a 0–0 away draw against Mallorca. He made 40 appearances across his first season in Spain and won his first club honour on 20 April 2011 as his team won the Copa del Rey final against El Clásico rivals Barcelona.

He scored his first competitive goal for Real Madrid in the Champions League, on 18 October 2011 against Lyon. He scored his first Copa del Rey goal against Málaga in a 3–2 home win when Real Madrid were trailing behind 0–2, and his first league goal against Espanyol in a 5–0 home win.

On 21 April 2012, Khedira scored his second league goal, against Barcelona; the goal was Real Madrid's 108th of the season in the league, breaking the previous La Liga record of 107, also set by them in the 1989–90 season.

On 24 May 2014, Khedira was in the starting 11 against Atletico Madrid in the UEFA Champions League final, in which Real Madrid won 4-1.

=== Juventus ===
On 9 June 2015, Serie A club Juventus announced that Khedira had signed a four-year deal on a free transfer. The move was completed on 1 July, at the start of the 2015–16 season.

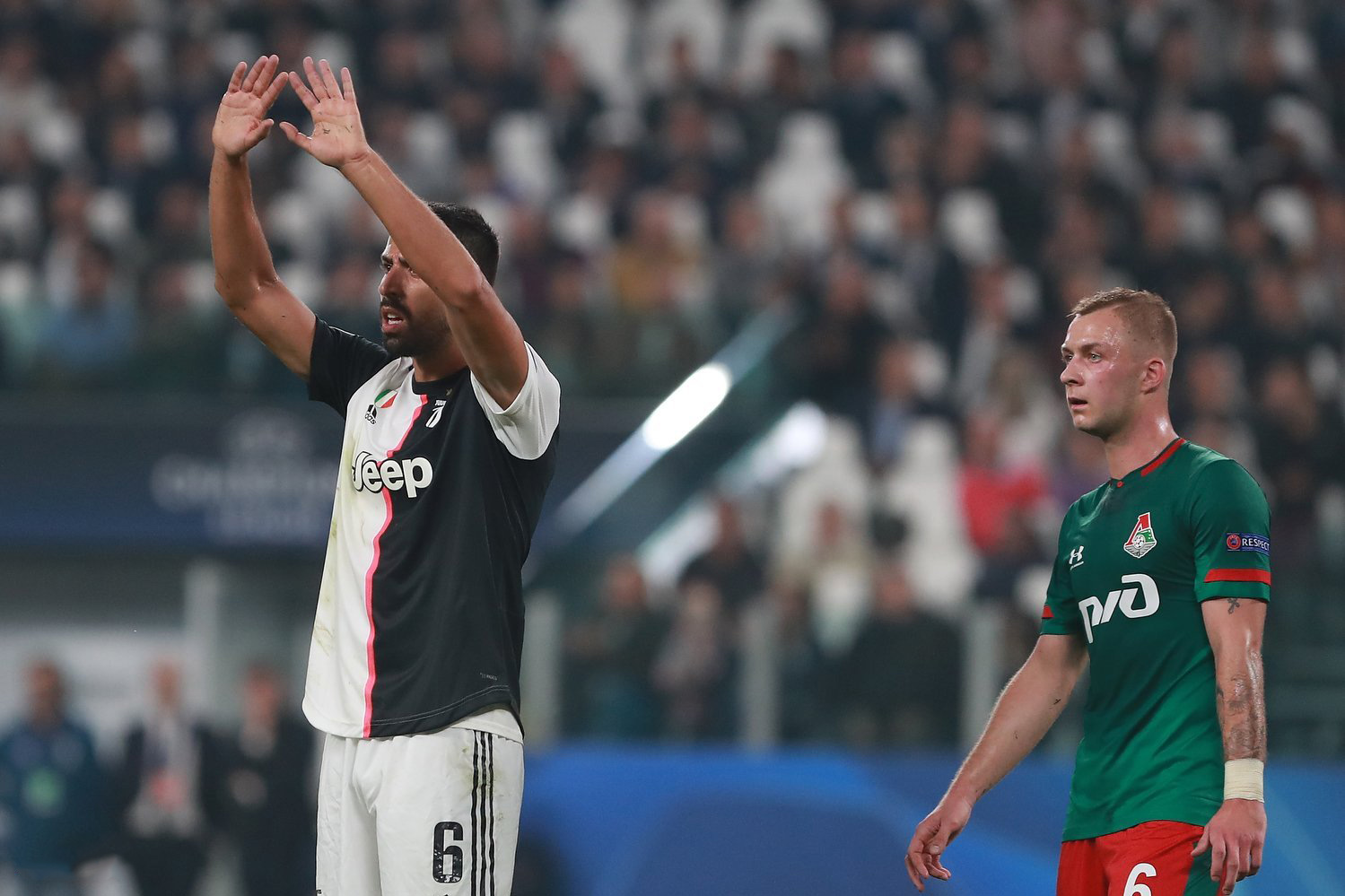
Khedira (left) playing against Lokomotiv Moscow during the 2019–20 season

On 1 August, Khedira was stretchered off the pitch after just 25 minutes while playing in a pre-season friendly match against Marseille with a hamstring injury and was ruled out of the Supercoppa Italiana a week later against Lazio. Two days later Juventus confirmed that it was actually a muscle tear in his right thigh, and that he would be sidelined for approximately two months. He was called back to action on 30 September as he started in a Champions League group stage match in a 2–0 win over Sevilla. On 4 October, Khedira made his Serie A debut, starting and scoring the final goal of a 3–1 home win against Bologna in the 63rd minute.

On 20 March 2016, Khedira scored his fourth goal of the league season in a 4–1 win at Torino in the Derby della Mole, but was given a straight red card for dissent later on.

On 20 August 2016, Khedira opened the 2016–17 Serie A season with a goal in a 2–1 home win over Fiorentina. A week later he scored the only goal in a 1–0 away win over Lazio in the league.

On 22 October 2017, Khedira scored his first career hat-trick in a 6–2 away win over Udinese.

On 7 March 2018, Khedira made his 100th appearance for Juventus in a 2–1 win over Tottenham at Wembley Stadium, in the second leg of the round of 16 of the UEFA Champions League, assisting Gonzalo Higuaín's goal.

In September 2018, Khedira signed a new contract with Juventus, which would keep him at the team until 2021. In February 2019 he was ruled out for a month to undergo treatment after it was diagnosed that he suffered from an irregular heartbeat. He returned to action on 6 April, coming as a substitute for his injured compatriot Emre Can in a 2–1 home win over AC Milan.

=== Hertha BSC ===
On 1 February 2021, Khedira returned to the Bundesliga, signing for Hertha BSC. On 5 February 2021, he made his debut in a 0–1 defeat against Bayern Munich. On 19 May 2021, he announced that he would retire at the end of the 2020–21 season.

== International career ==
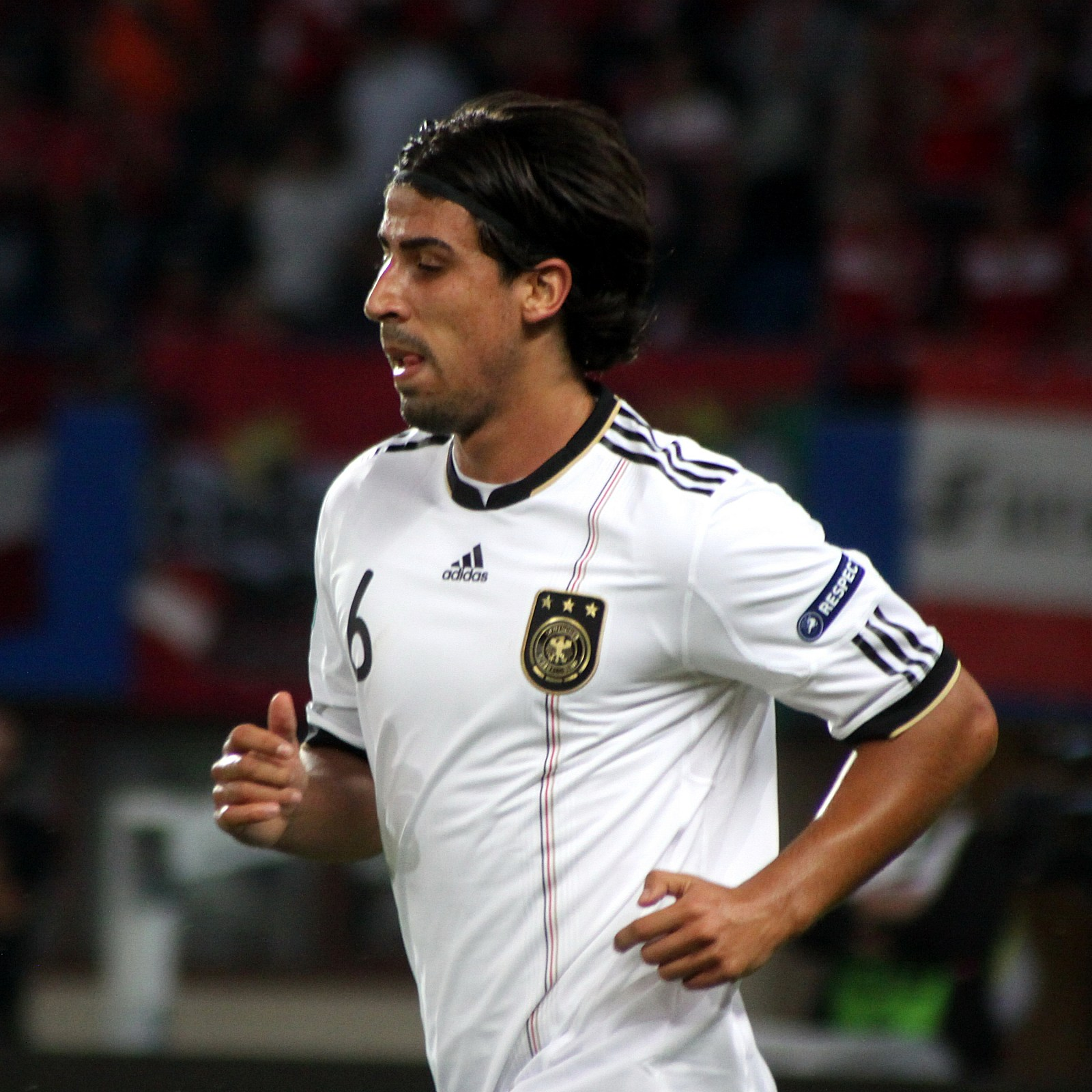
Khedira playing for the Germany national football team in 2011

=== Youth teams and debut ===
Khedira has appeared 30 times for several German youth national teams; he captained the under-21 side during the 2009 European Under-21 Championship, which Germany won, defeating England 4–0 in the final.

Khedira made his debut for the senior national squad on 5 September 2009 in a friendly match against South Africa. He was substituted on in the 73rd minute for Simon Rolfes.

=== 2010 World Cup ===
Khedira was called up to the German squad for the 2010 World Cup in South Africa by coach Joachim Löw. Filling in for the injured Michael Ballack as a central midfielder, he played in all seven matches, and was only substituted twice, as Germany reached the semi-finals. After appearances in five friendlies prior to the World Cup, he made his first competitive appearance against Australia in Germany's first group game. On 10 July 2010, with his first senior international goal, he scored Germany's 16th and last goal of the tournament, in the third place match against Uruguay; Khedira's match-winning header, which came eight minutes from time, ensured the final 3–2 scoreline, and won the young German team the bronze medal.

=== Euro 2012 ===
Khedira was in the starting lineup in eight qualification matches for Euro 2012, helping Germany top their qualifying group with a record ten wins out of ten matches. During the final tournament, he featured in every minute of their run to the semi-finals, scoring in the 4–2 quarter-final win over Greece at the PGE Arena Gdańsk, and was selected for the Team of the Tournament.

=== 2014 World Cup ===
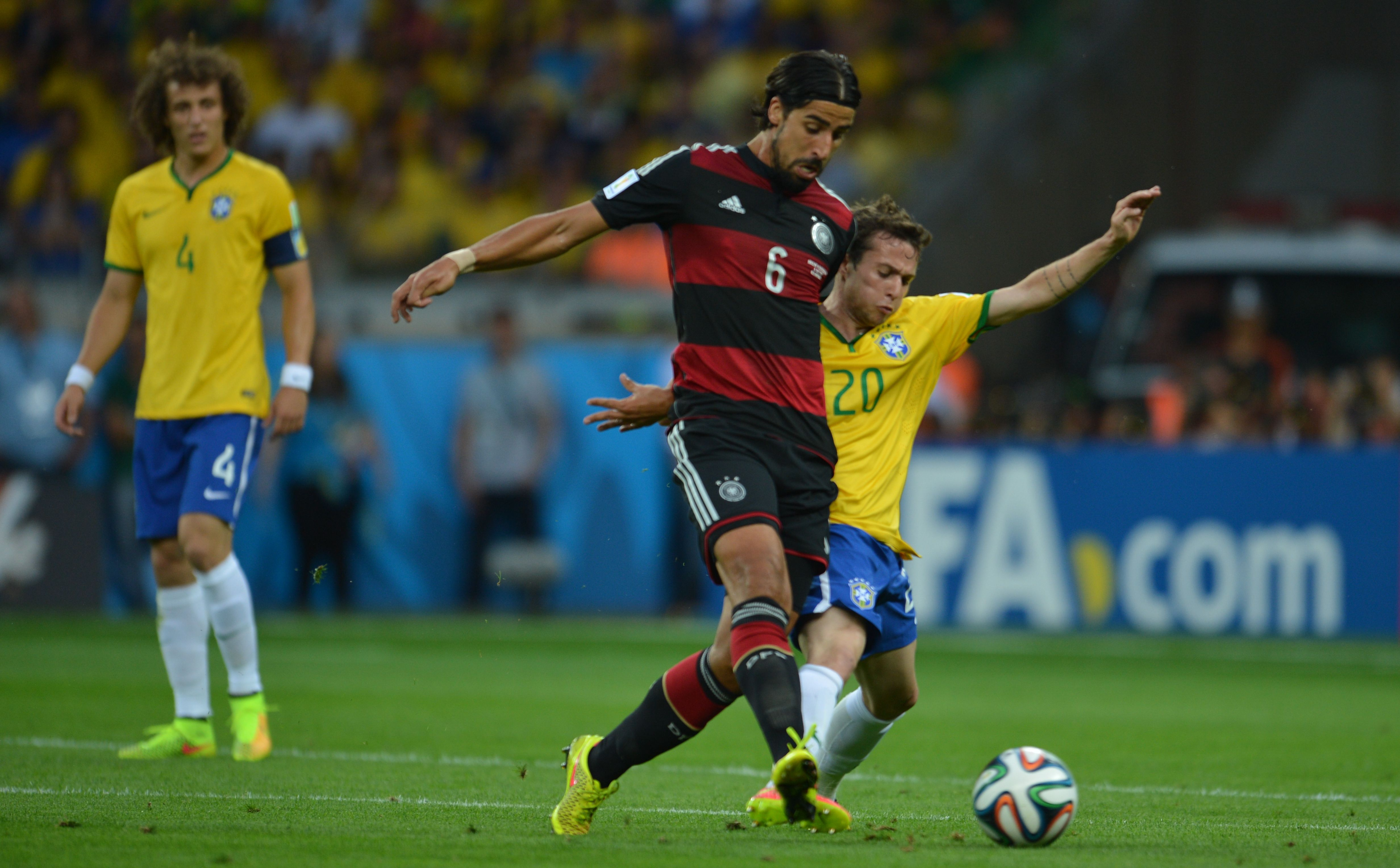
Khedira playing against Bernard at the 2014 FIFA World Cup

Khedira tore his ACL in his right knee in a friendly match against Italy on 15 November 2013 and it was estimated that he would be ruled out for around six months, which put his participation at the 2014 FIFA World Cup into question. However, he recovered in time to be named in Germany's squad for the tournament, and was selected to start in the team's opening match, a 4–0 win against Portugal. On 8 July, he scored Germany's fifth goal in the 7–1 semi-final defeat of hosts Brazil. He was injured during the pre-match warmup for the Final against Argentina, and was replaced by Christoph Kramer in the team's starting line-up, as Germany eventually won 1–0 after extra time.

=== Euro 2016 ===
Khedira was named to Joachim Löw's 23-man Germany squad for UEFA Euro 2016. On 2 July, he was forced off after sustaining an injury in the first half of the quarter-finals against Italy, and was ruled out for the remainder of the tournament; Germany won the match 6–5 in the resulting penalty shoot-out, following a 1–1 draw after extra-time. As in the previous edition of the tournament, Germany were once again eliminated in the semi-finals of the competition, following a 2–0 defeat to hosts France on 7 July.

During this time, Khedira was a part of a collaboration between the German Football Association and The LEGO Group, who in May 2016 released a Europe-exclusive collectible minifigure series, with Khedira featured as the eleventh of sixteen minifigures in the collection.

=== 2018 World Cup ===
On 4 June 2018, Khedira was included in Joachim Löw's final 23-man squad for the 2018 FIFA World Cup. As Germany were eliminated in the group stage, Khedira was deemed as one of the weakest performers in the squad. After the tournament, he was left off the team for the subsequent UEFA Nations League matches.

== Style of play ==
Khedira is considered a dynamic and well-rounded midfielder, with good awareness and "flawless aerial ability", who can cover a lot of ground efficiently, recover the ball and quickly join in the team's attacking plays; he is also capable of being a goal threat with his heading accuracy and powerful mid-range shooting. A physically strong, energetic, and tactically intelligent player, he is also known for his ball-winning abilities, work-rate, and vision, as well as his solid technique and reliable passing, which allow him to play anywhere in midfield; although usually a central midfielder, he has also been deployed as a defensive midfielder, as a box-to-box midfielder, or even in a more offensive role as a mezzala, due to his stamina, movement (both on and off the ball), positional sense, and versatility, which also enable him to create space or contribute to his team's offensive plays with goals, due to his ability to make late runs into the penalty area from behind. Jonathan Wilson, when writing for The Guardian in 2013, described Khedira as a "destroyer with carrying tendencies," namely a holding midfielder who is predominantly tasked with running, winning back possession, and distributing the ball to other players, but who is also "capable of making late runs or carrying the ball at his feet." In spite of his playing ability, however, Khedira is also known to be injury-prone. His playing role and style have been likened to that of compatriot Torsten Frings.

== Broadcasting ==
In May 2021, Khedira was announced as one of several former players who would serve as studio analysts for ESPN's coverage of the rescheduled UEFA Euro 2020. He joined DAZN as an expert commentator in 2022 and extended his contract in 2025.

== Coaching career ==
In July 2026, Khedira joined the coaching staff of his former coach, José Mourinho, at Real Madrid as an assistant coach.

== Personal life ==
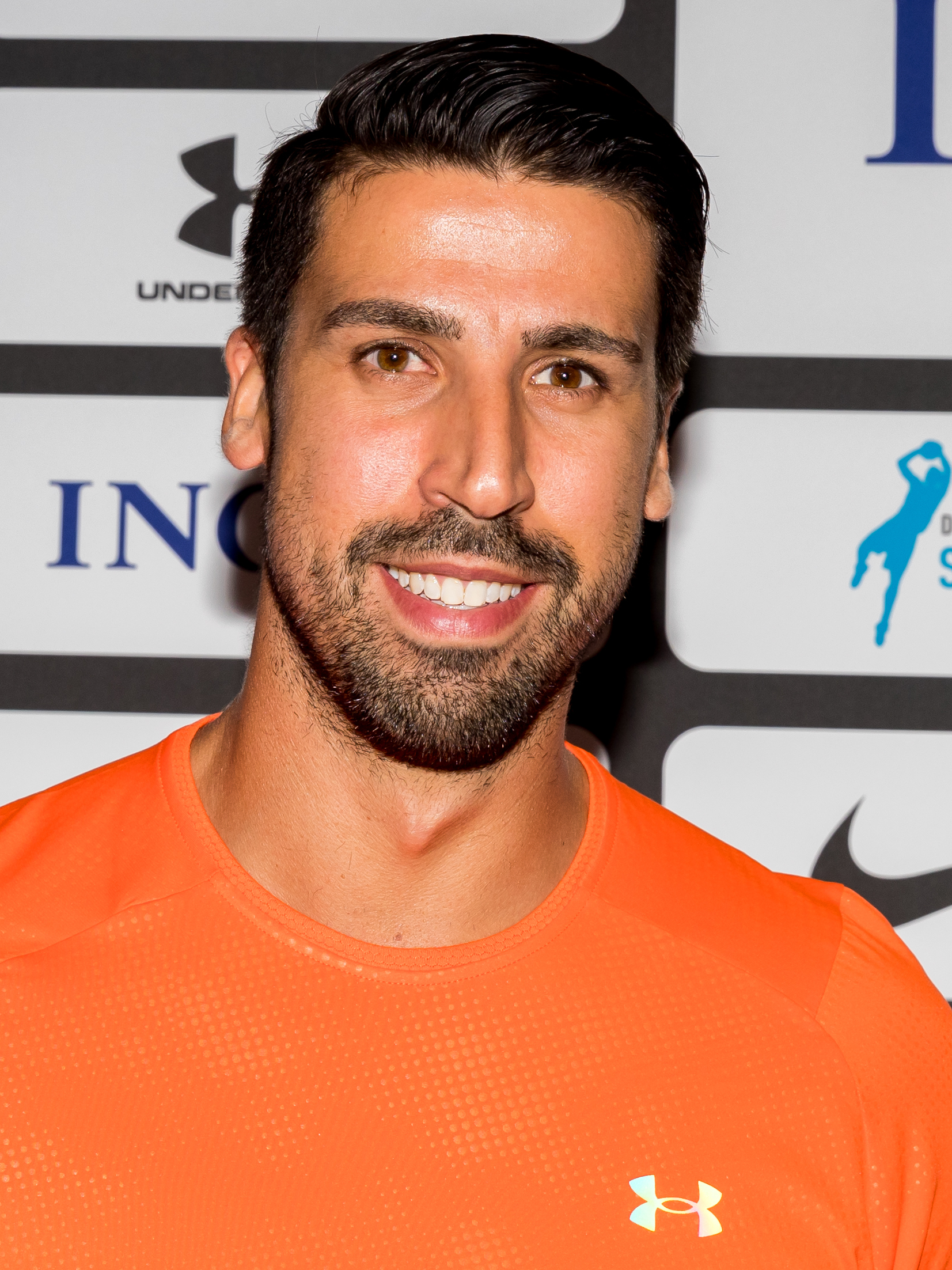
Khedira in 2022

Khedira was born in Stuttgart, Baden-Württemberg to a Tunisian father and a German mother. Sami's younger brother Rani is also a footballer, and has represented the German U19 team. However, Rani switched to Tunisia. Khedira dated German model Lena Gercke between 2011 and 2015.

== Career statistics ==
=== Club ===
Appearances and goals by club, season and competition
Club	Season	League			National cup (Note: Includes DFB-Pokal, Copa del Rey, Coppa Italia)		Europe (Note: Includes UEFA Champions League, UEFA Cup/Europa League, UEFA Intertoto Cup)		Other (Note: Includes the DFL-Ligapokal, Supercopa de España, UEFA Super Cup, FIFA Club World Cup)		Total		Ref.
Club	Season	Division	Apps	Goals	Apps	Goals	Apps	Goals	Apps	Goals	Apps	Goals	Ref.
VfB Stuttgart II	2004–05	Regionalliga Süd	5	0	—		—		—		5	0	
VfB Stuttgart II	2005–06	Regionalliga Süd	7	0	—		—		—		7	0	
VfB Stuttgart II	2006–07	Regionalliga Süd	9	1	—		—		—		9	1	
VfB Stuttgart II	Total		21	1	0	0	0	0	0	0	21	1	—
VfB Stuttgart	2006–07	Bundesliga	22	4	4	0	—		—		26	4	
VfB Stuttgart	2007–08	Bundesliga	24	1	4	0	5	0	1	0	34	1	
VfB Stuttgart	2008–09	Bundesliga	27	7	2	0	8	1	—		37	8	
VfB Stuttgart	2009–10	Bundesliga	25	2	2	1	8	0	—		35	3	
VfB Stuttgart	Total		98	14	12	1	21	1	1	0	132	16	—
Real Madrid	2010–11	La Liga	25	0	7	0	8	0	—		40	0	
Real Madrid	2011–12	La Liga	28	2	4	1	8	1	2	0	42	4	
Real Madrid	2012–13	La Liga	25	3	6	1	11	0	2	0	44	4	
Real Madrid	2013–14	La Liga	13	1	0	0	5	0	—		18	1	
Real Madrid	2014–15	La Liga	11	0	3	0	2	0	1	0	17	0	
Real Madrid	Total		102	6	20	2	34	1	5	0	161	9	—
Juventus	2015–16	Serie A	20	5	1	0	4	0	0	0	25	5	
Juventus	2016–17	Serie A	31	5	3	0	11	0	1	0	46	5	
Juventus	2017–18	Serie A	26	9	4	0	8	0	1	0	39	9	
Juventus	2018–19	Serie A	10	2	2	0	4	0	1	0	17	2	
Juventus	2019–20	Serie A	12	0	1	0	5	0	0	0	18	0	
Juventus	2020–21	Serie A	0	0	0	0	0	0	0	0	0	0	
Juventus	Total		99	21	11	0	32	0	3	0	145	21	—
Hertha BSC	2020–21	Bundesliga	9	0	—		—		—		9	0	
Career total			329	42	43	3	87	2	9	0	468	47	—

=== International ===
Appearances and goals by national team and year
National team	Year	Apps	Goals
Germany
Germany	2009	1	0
Germany	2010	16	1
Germany	2011	7	0
Germany	2012	12	1
Germany	2013	8	2
Germany	2014	9	1
Germany	2015	4	0
Germany	2016	12	2
Germany	2017	3	0
Germany	2018	5	0
Total		77	7

Germany score listed first, score column indicates score after each Khedira goal

List of international goals scored by Sami Khedira
No.	Date	Venue	Opponent	Score	Result	Competition
1	10 July 2010	Nelson Mandela Bay Stadium, Port Elizabeth, South Africa	Uruguay	3–2	3–2	2010 FIFA World Cup
2	22 June 2012	Stadion Energa Gdańsk, Gdańsk, Poland	Greece	2–1	4–2	UEFA Euro 2012
3	6 February 2013	Stade de France, Saint-Denis, France	France	2–1	2–1	Friendly
4	11 October 2013	RheinEnergieStadion, Cologne, Germany	Republic of Ireland	1–0	3–0	2014 FIFA World Cup qualification
5	26 June 2014	Mineirão, Belo Horizonte, Brazil	Brazil	5–0	7–1	2014 FIFA World Cup
6	11 October 2016	HDI Arena, Hanover, Germany	Northern Ireland	2–0	2–0	2018 FIFA World Cup qualification
7	11 November 2016	San Marino Stadium, Serravalle, San Marino	San Marino	1–0	8–0	2018 FIFA World Cup qualification

== Honours ==
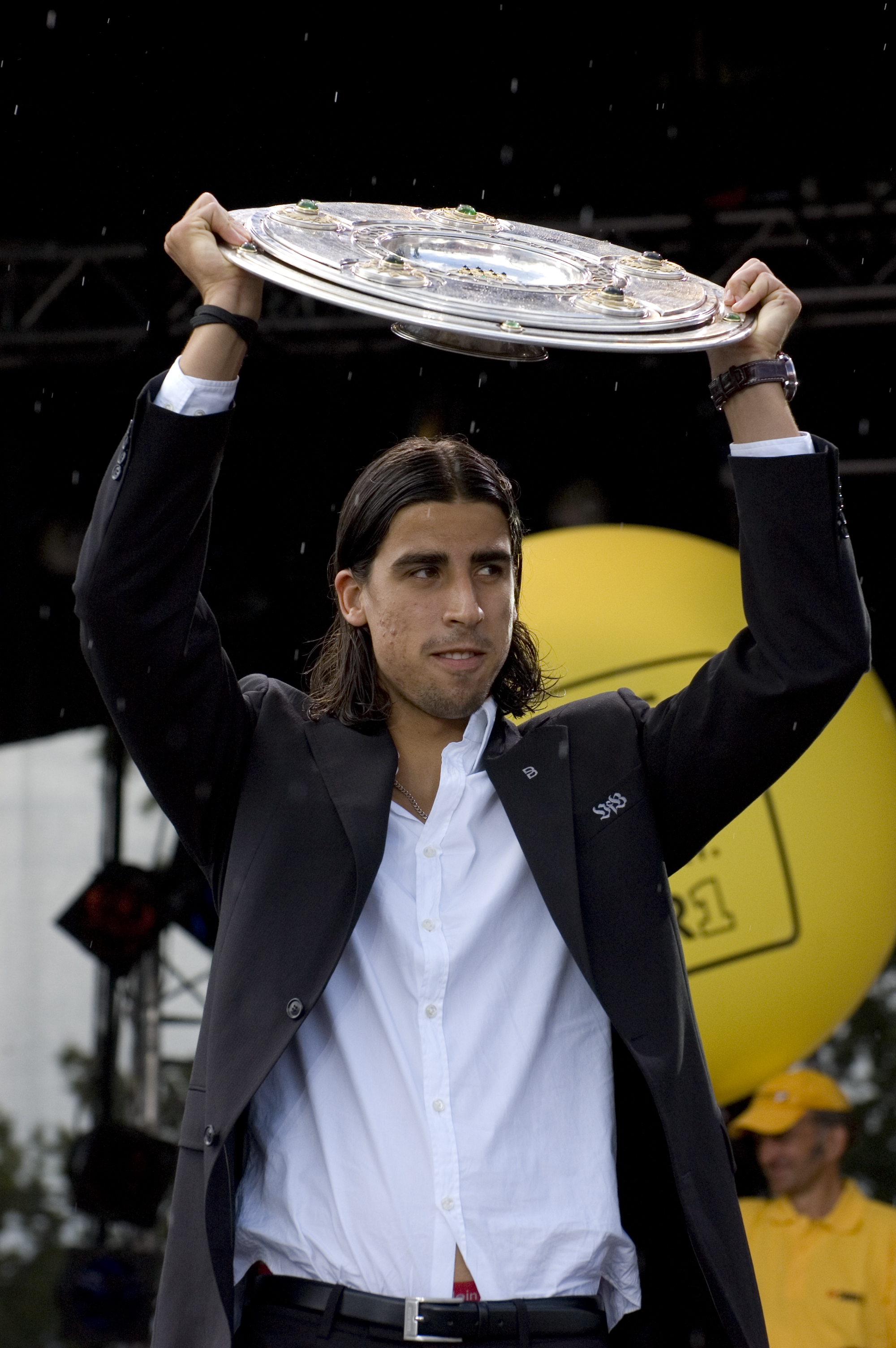
Khedira celebrates winning the Bundesliga with VfB Stuttgart in 2007.

VfB Stuttgart

- Bundesliga: 2006–07

Real Madrid

- La Liga: 2011–12
- Copa del Rey: 2010–11, 2013–14
- Supercopa de España: 2012
- UEFA Champions League: 2013–14
- UEFA Super Cup: 2014
- FIFA Club World Cup: 2014

Juventus

- Serie A: 2015–16, 2016–17, 2017–18, 2018–19, 2019–20
- Coppa Italia: 2015–16, 2016–17, 2017–18
- Supercoppa Italiana: 2018
- UEFA Champions League runner-up: 2016–17

Germany U21

- UEFA European Under-21 Championship: 2009

Germany

- FIFA World Cup: 2014

Individual

- UEFA European Championship Team of the Tournament: 2012

Orders

- Silbernes Lorbeerblatt: 2010, 2014
- Order of Merit of Baden-Württemberg: 2016
