= Alfonso Morales (footballer) =

Chilean footballer (born 1940)

Personal information
- Full name: René Alfonso Morales Tame
- Date of birth: 25 May 1940
- Place of birth: Coquimbo, Chile
- Date of death: 20 November 2023 (aged 83)
- Place of death: Coquimbo, Chile
- Height: 1.80 m (5 ft 11 in)
- Position: Centre-back

Youth career
- Atlético El Llano
- 1955: Coquimbo (city team)
- Coquimbo Sporting

Senior career*
Years	Team	Apps	(Gls)
1958–1966	Coquimbo Unido		
1967–1970	Deportes La Serena		
- * Club domestic league appearances and goals

René Alfonso Morales Tame (born 25 May 1940), known as Alfonso Morales and more popularly as Pocho Morales, was a Chilean football player who played as a centre-back.

== Early years ==
Born in Coquimbo, a port city in Chile, his father was Spanish and his mother was Bolivian. As a child, Morales played for Club Atlético El Llano and Coquimbo Sporting and took part of the Coquimbo team for the 1955 national youth championship in Rancagua at the age of 14.

A complete sportsman, he played roller hockey, basketball for Club Atenas and water polo, being called up to the Chile squad for the 1958 national tournament in Valparaíso.

== Career ==
Morales played for both Coquimbo Unido and Deportes La Serena, traditional opponents in the Coquimbo Region, being considered a legendary player of the first. The matches when he was a player of Coquimbo Unido, where also took part Arturo Canilla Díaz, are well remembered, according to the former footballer and opponent, Hernán Godoy.

Along with Coquimbo Unido, he got promotion to Primera División, the first title for the club, after winning the 1962 Segunda División, in the last matchday versus Universidad Técnica del Estado what he considers "an unforgettable game". The 1963 season, was the first for Coquimbo Unido in the Primera División.

He stayed with Coquimbo Unido until 1966. The club was in Primera División for 3 seasons from 1963 to 1965. In 1965 it was relegated to Segunda División after one of the worst seasons for a Chilean club, according to Morales. In 1967, he switched to Deportes La Serena, staying with the club until the 1970 season in Primera División.

Despite he didn't take part of any Chile national team, he frequently was chosen as one of the best centre-backs in the magazine rankings. As an anecdote, in times when football was more aggressive, having hard duels with players such as Hernán Godoy and Pedro Graffigna, he stunned Carlos Campos from Universidad de Chile by an accidental headbutt.

Following his retirement, he performed as Sport Manager of Coquimbo Unido in the 1970s. He was one of the leaders in charge of the signings of the Brazilians players Torino, Benê and Liminha, who made up a well remembered attacking trident in Chilean football in 1979.

== Personal life ==
His nickname, Pocho, is a short form of Alfonso. While he was a player, he was nicknamed Mariscal (Marshal).

He stated that his football idols were Arturo Farías from Deportes La Serena and Raúl Sánchez from Santiago Wanderers. He has a close friendship with José Sulantay, who was an opponent in football.

After his retirement, he worked for EMPART Coquimbo, the social security institution for private sector employees for 17 years.

His left leg was amputated due to complications with diabetes.

He died on 20 November 2023, aged 83.

== Honours ==
Coquimbo Unido

- Segunda División: 1962
