= Arturo Díaz =

Arturo Díaz may refer to:

- Arturo Díaz (wrestler), Cuban Olympic wrestler
- Arturo Díaz (footballer), Chilean footballer and manager
- Arturo Díaz Mendoza, known as Villano III, Mexican luchador
