= Alfonso Morales =

Alfonso Morales may refer to

- Alfonso Morales (fencer) (born 1937), U.S. Olympic fencer
- Alfonso Morales (footballer) (René Alfonso Morales Tame, born 1940), Chilean footballer
- Alfonso Morales (journalist) (Gilberto Alfonso Morales Villela, 1949–2020), Mexican journalist and sports commentator
- Alfonso Morales (police officer), U.S. police officer, Milwaukee Police Department
