= Filipe Luís =

Brazilian association football player (born 1985)

- Filipe Luís in AS Monaco FC, 2026

Personal information
- Full name: Filipe Luís Kasmirski
- Date of birth: 9 August 1985 (age 41)
- Place of birth: Jaraguá do Sul, Brazil
- Height: 1.82 m (6 ft 0 in)
- Position: Left back

Team information
- Current team: Monaco (head coach)

Youth career
- 1995–2003: Figueirense

Senior career*
Years	Team	Apps	(Gls)
2003–2004	Figueirense	49	(4)
2004–2008	Ajax	0	(0)
2005–2006	→ Real Madrid B (loan)	37	(0)
2006–2008	→ Deportivo La Coruña (loan)	52	(1)
2008–2010	Deportivo La Coruña	59	(5)
2010–2014	Atlético Madrid	127	(2)
2014–2015	Chelsea	15	(0)
2015–2019	Atlético Madrid	113	(7)
2019–2023	Flamengo	116	(4)
Total		568	(23)

International career
2009–2019	Brazil	44	(2)

Managerial career
- 2024: Flamengo U17
- 2024: Flamengo U20
- 2024–2026: Flamengo
- 2026–: Monaco
Medal record
Men's football
Representing Brazil
FIFA Confederations Cup
Winner	2013 Brazil
Copa América
Winner	2019 Brazil
FIFA U-20 World Cup
Third place	2005 Netherland
South American U-20 Championship
Runner-up	2005 Colombia
- * Club domestic league appearances and goals

Filipe Luís Kasmirski (born 9 August 1985) is a Brazilian football manager and former player who is the head coach of Ligue 1 club Monaco.

A left back of tireless approach also known for his tactical awareness, he spent most of his early professional career in Spain, beginning at Deportivo where he spent four seasons. In 2010 he joined Atlético Madrid, and won four trophies including the La Liga championship in 2014. He signed with Chelsea in July of that year for £15.8 million, helping them to both the Premier League and the League Cup, but lack of game time in London saw him return to Atlético a year later, winning the Europa League and Super Cup in his second spell (both in 2018). He then joined Brazilian giants Flamengo as a free agent, where he won a number of honours including the Campeonato Brasilero in 2019, 2020, and the Copa Libertadores in 2019, and 2022.

Filipe Luís made his debut for Brazil in 2009 and went on to earn over 40 caps, representing the nation at the 2013 Confederations Cup, three Copas América and the 2018 World Cup, winning the Confederations Cup as well as the 2019 Copa América. On 30 November 2023, Filipe Luís announced his retirement from playing.

== Club career ==
=== Early years ===
Filipe Luís was born in Jaraguá do Sul, Santa Catarina. Coming from Figueirense as an attacking midfielder, he had his first taste of European football with Ajax in 2004, spending one full season in the Beloften Eredivisie with the reserves. He was called up for the first team twice by manager Danny Blind for an Eredivisie match against Den Bosch and a UEFA Cup game against Auxerre, but remained on the bench for both fixtures. Despite never playing a competitive match, he credited the Dutch club for helping him learn tactical aspects of the game, as well as aiding his development by allowing him to train with players such as Rafael van der Vaart and Wesley Sneijder.

Afterwards, Filipe Luís was registered under Rentistas, who had a partnership with his agent Juan Figer. In August 2005, he was loaned to Real Madrid, spending the entire season with its B team in Segunda División; the move was not made subsequently permanent, after high financial requests from the Uruguayan club.

=== Deportivo La Coruña ===
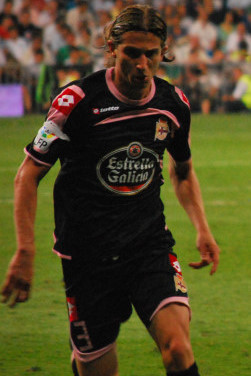
Filipe Luís playing for Deportivo against Real Madrid, in 2009

Filipe Luís joined Deportivo La Coruña in August 2006, with a buyout clause of $2.2 million. He did not have many opportunities in his first season, but his loan was extended for a further year with the same buy-out clause. In 2007–08, after first-choice Joan Capdevila's departure to Villarreal, he went on to establish himself as first-choice left-back.

On 10 June 2008, Filipe Luís was purchased and signed a five-year contract. During his debut season as a Deportivo player, he was the only outfield player in La Liga to appear in all 38 league games, scoring twice.

On 23 January 2010, immediately after netting the first in a league game against Athletic Bilbao (an eventual 3–1 home win), Filipe Luís sustained a horrific injury to his right fibula after opposing goalkeeper Gorka Iraizoz landed on his leg – again, he had played all matches and minutes during the campaign, and the side stood fourth in the table. Amazingly, he returned to action just four months later, appearing in the second half of the 1–0 home victory over Mallorca and being involved in the play which led to Riki's goal; the Galicians would eventually finish in the tenth position.

=== Atlético Madrid ===
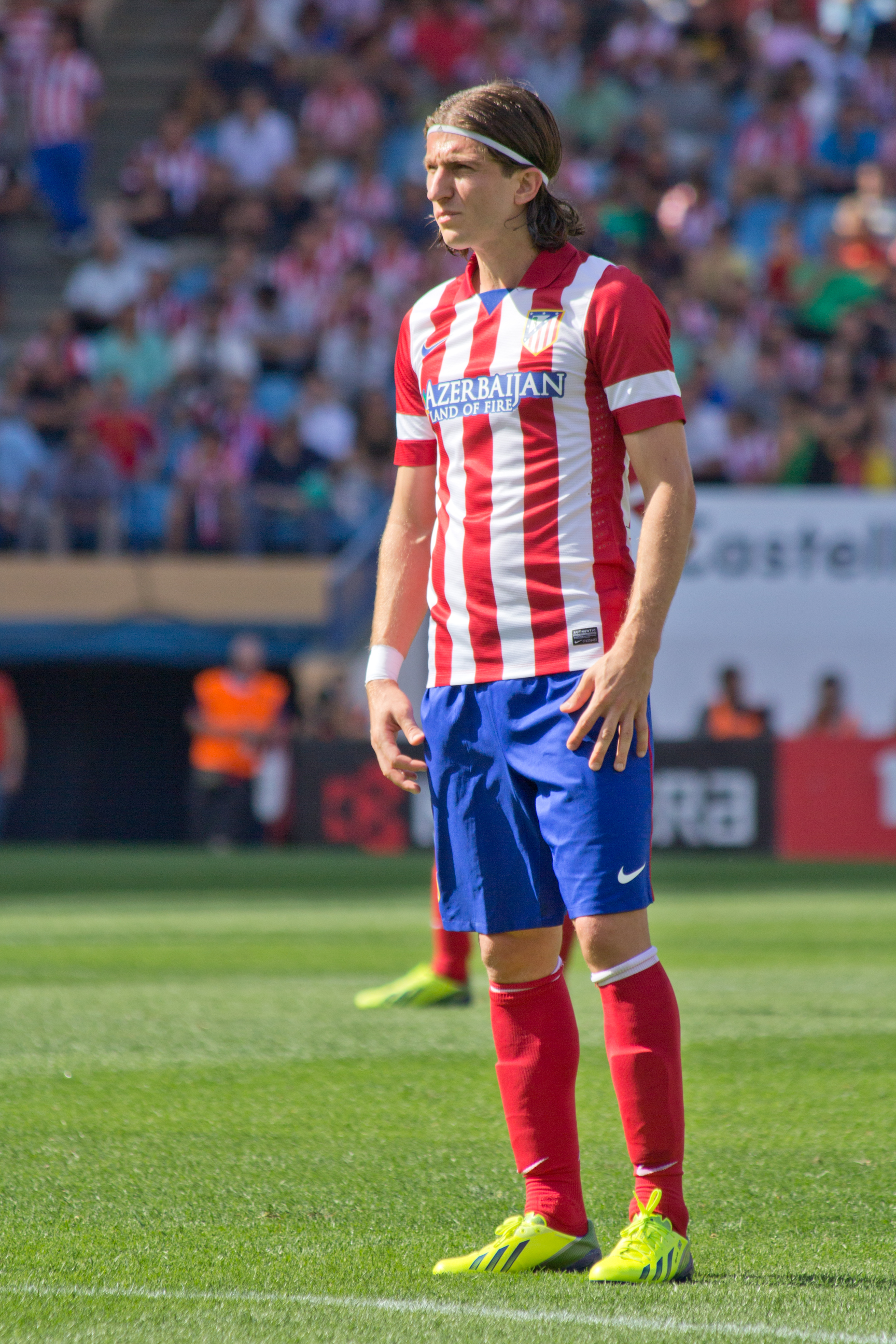
Filipe Luís during a match with Atlético Madrid in September 2013

On 23 July 2010, Filipe Luís signed for five years with Atlético Madrid for an undisclosed fee, reported to have reached €12 or 13.5 million. His official debut came on 26 September at home against Real Zaragoza, where he set up compatriot Diego Costa for the game's only goal, receiving Player of the match accolades.

In his first season, Filipe Luís constantly fought for first-choice status with youth graduate Antonio López. On 10 April 2011, he scored his first goal for the team in a 3–0 home win over Real Sociedad. On 17 January 2013, he netted the second in a 2–0 defeat of Real Betis in the Copa del Rey, and also played the full 120 minutes in the final of the latter competition against Real Madrid, which ended with a 2–1 triumph at the Santiago Bernabéu.

Filipe Luís made his first appearances in the UEFA Champions League in the 2013–14 edition, helping the Colchoneros secure first place in Group G by scoring once in a 4–0 home rout of Austria Wien. During the league campaign, he was part of a stellar backline that only conceded 26 goals in 38 games as Atlético won the league title for the first time in 18 years. Additionally, he took part in ten matches in the Champions League, including the 1–4 final loss to Real Madrid in Lisbon, being subsequently voted the best defender in the Spanish League alongside teammate Miranda and Real Madrid's Sergio Ramos.

=== Chelsea ===
On 16 July 2014, Chelsea and Atlético agreed a fee of £15.8 million for the transfer of Filipe Luís, subject to personal terms. The player ultimately signed a three-year contract two days later, stating upon his arrival, "This move is a dream come true for me. I now have the opportunity to play for Chelsea, and also in the Premier League. I'm very happy and looking forward to getting started and giving my best for the team during the coming seasons."

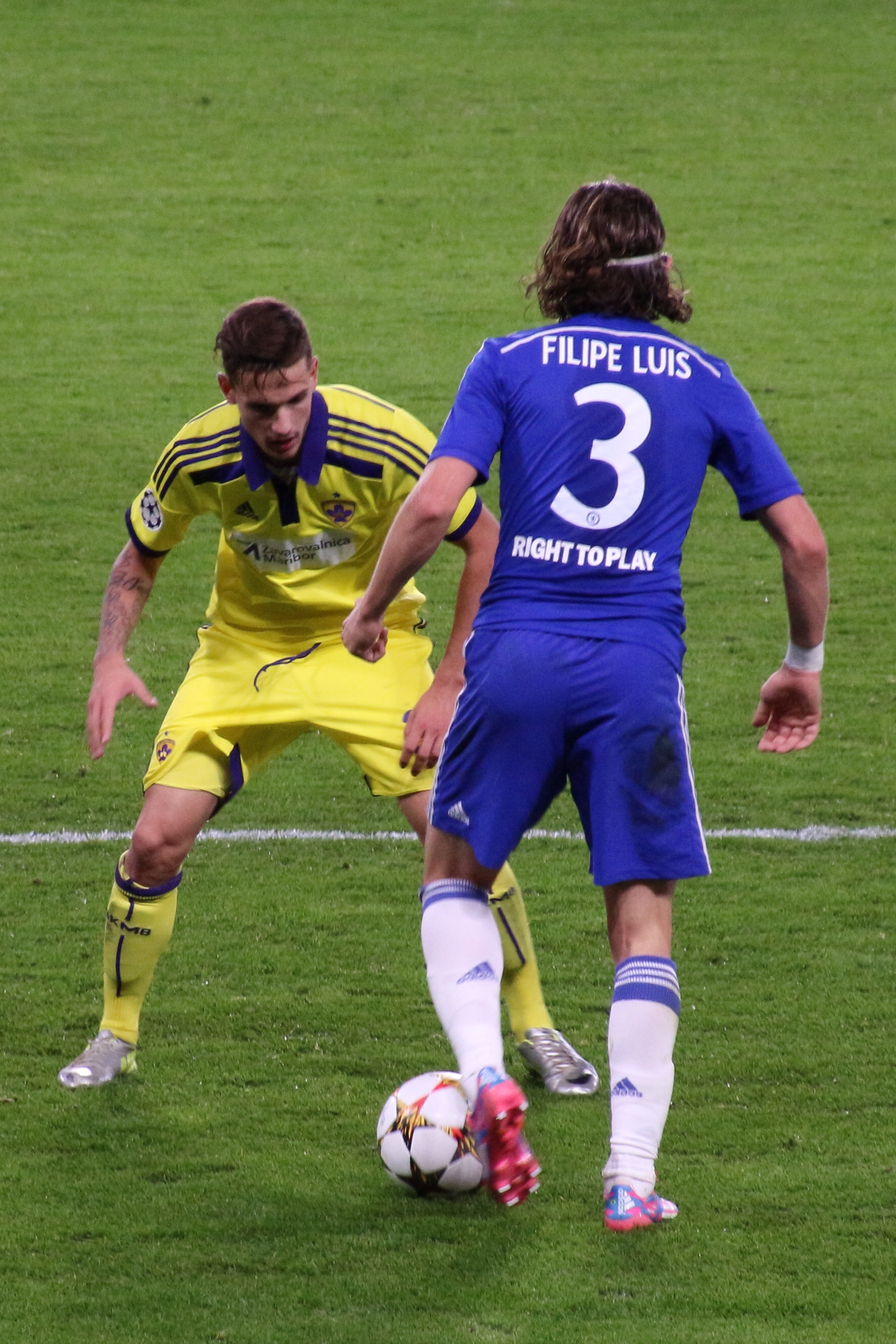
Filipe Luís in action for Chelsea against Maribor (2014)

Filipe Luís made his debut in a pre-season friendly against Wolfsberger AC, on 23 July 2014. His squad number was confirmed as 3, replacing Ashley Cole who had just moved to Roma. In his new team's first match of the league season, away to Burnley, he was an unused substitute, with César Azpilicueta playing at left back; he later expressed that he was content to be second choice behind his teammate if they were playing well, comparing his situation to the team's experienced goalkeeper Petr Čech, who had been benched for Thibaut Courtois.

Filipe Luís made his league debut in the third round, featuring the last seven minutes of a 6–3 win at Everton in place of Eden Hazard on 30 August 2014. He started for the first time on 17 September, playing the entirety of a 1–1 home draw against Schalke 04 in the first group stage game; with Azpilicueta suspended, he received his first start on 26 October, a 1–1 draw away to Manchester United.

Filipe Luís' only goal for the Blues came on 16 December 2014, a 25-yard free-kick in a 3–1 victory at Derby County in the quarter-finals of the League Cup. Azpilicueta, however, played at left-back in the final of the competition, won 2–0 against Tottenham Hotspur. On 3 May 2015, he came on as an added-time substitute for Hazard in a 1–0 home win over Crystal Palace which secured the league title.

On 21 July 2015, manager José Mourinho confirmed that Filipe Luís would be leaving Stamford Bridge after only one year.

=== Return to Atlético Madrid ===
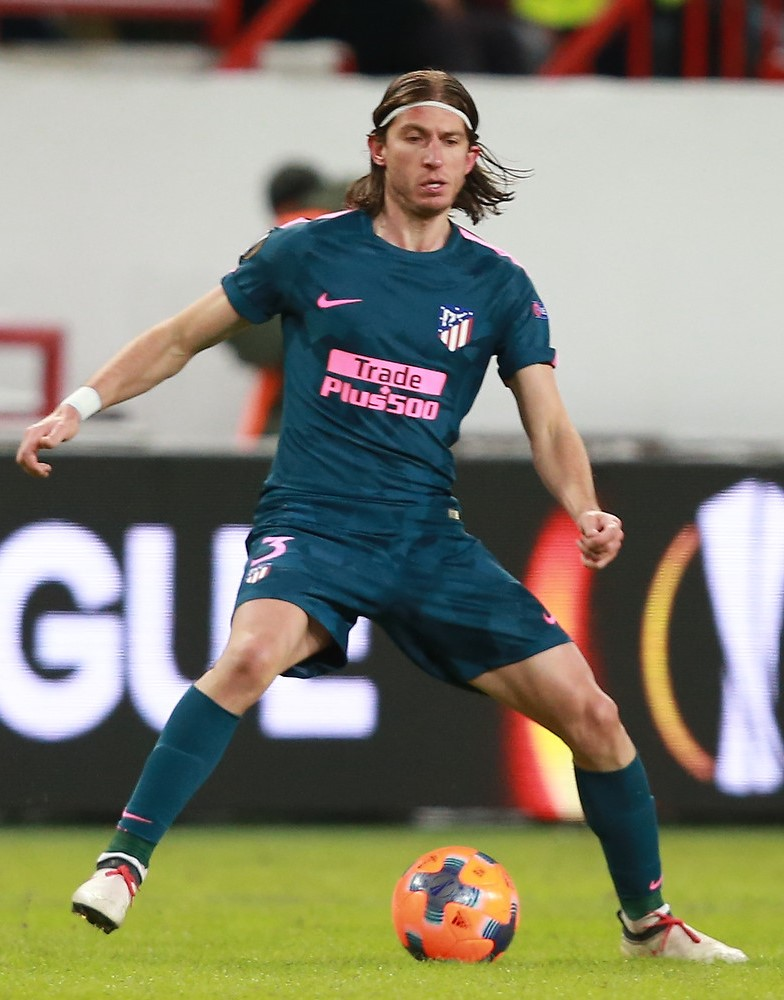
Filipe Luís in 2018

On 28 July 2015, Filipe Luís re-joined Atlético Madrid on a four-year deal for an undisclosed fee. He made his return to the team on 22 August as they opened the season with a 1–0 home victory against newly promoted Las Palmas. In the 3–0 win in the reverse fixture the following 17 January, he scored his first goal since returning.

On 30 January 2016, Filipe Luís was sent off in the first half of a 1–2 loss at Barcelona for a challenge on Lionel Messi, and teammate Diego Godín was later also dismissed. The duo escaped criticism by manager Diego Simeone, but Filipe Luís was subsequently handed a three-match ban. He continued being an undisputed starter during his spell at the Vicente Calderón Stadium.

In March 2018, after a collision with Lokomotiv Moscow's Eder in a Europa League tie, Filipe Luís broke the fibula in his left leg, initially being thought to miss the rest of the season and thus the 2018 FIFA World Cup but making a recovery in two months. He ended his second stint at Atlético upon the expiration of his contract, on 30 June 2019.

=== Flamengo ===
On 23 July 2019, Filipe Luís returned to Brazil and signed a two-and-a-half-year contract with Flamengo. On 30 November 2023, Filipe Luís announced his retirement after the end of the season. On 6 December 2023, after the final round of 2023 Campeonato Brasileiro Série A, Filipe Luís retired from professional football.

== International career ==
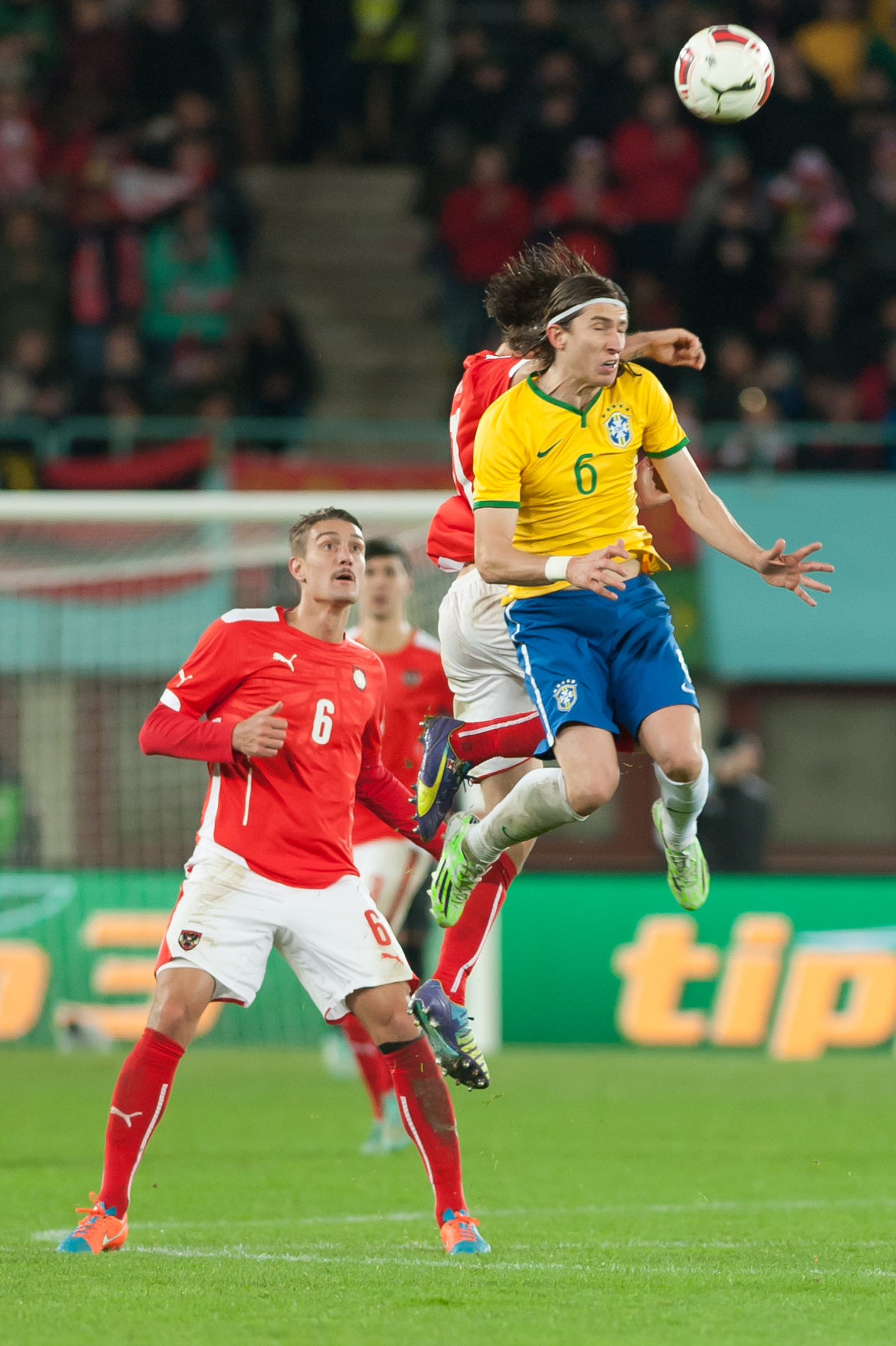
Filipe Luís heading a ball for Brazil against Austria, in 2014

On 7 August 2009, Filipe Luís was called up by Brazil for the first time, replacing injured Marcelo for a friendly against Estonia but eventually not leaving the bench in the 1–0 away win, on 12 August. He made his debut in a 2010 FIFA World Cup qualifier against Venezuela, on 15 October.

Filipe Luís was selected in the squad which won the 2013 FIFA Confederations Cup on home soil, although he did not enter the field during the competition. He was one of seven players put on standby for the 2014 World Cup, but did not make the final cut.

On 11 October 2014, in that year's Superclásico de las Américas in Beijing, Filipe Luís played the entirety of a 2–0 victory against Argentina. With Marcelo absent through injury, he played every minute of their campaign at the 2015 Copa América in Chile, which ended in the quarter-finals.

On 17 November 2015, Filipe Luís scored his first goal for Brazil in a 3–0 defeat of Peru for the 2018 World Cup qualification held in Salvador, Bahia. In May 2018, he was named in Tite's 23-man squad for the finals in Russia, making his debut in the competition on 27 June when he replaced the injured Marcelo in the early minutes of the 2–0 group stage win against Serbia.

In May 2019, Filipe Luís was included in the 23-man squad for the 2019 Copa América on home soil. In the quarter-final match against Paraguay on 27 June, he was replaced by Alex Sandro at half-time after suffering an injury, as his team advanced to the next stage after winning 4–3 on penalties; they subsequently went on to win the title, following a 3–1 win over Peru in the final at the Maracanã Stadium.

== Coaching career ==
=== Early coaching career ===
On 18 January 2024, Filipe Luís became the head coach of the under-17 team of his last club Flamengo. On 13 June 2024, he was promoted to the under-20 squad, replacing departed Mário Jorge, who left the club to take charge of Saudi Arabia U17 national team.

Just over a month after taking charge of the under-20 squad he managed the team to win his first title as head coach. On 24 August 2024, Flamengo played against Olympiacos in the 2024 Under-20 Intercontinental Cup beating the Greek team 2–1 in a thrilling match decided in the injury time.

=== Flamengo ===
On 30 September 2024, after the dismissal of Tite, Filipe Luís was named interim head coach of Flamengo's first team until the end of the season. The following day, however, he was presented as head coach with a contract until the end of 2025. He officially debuted on 2 October 2024, against Corinthians in the first leg of the 2024 Copa do Brasil semi-finals, Flamengo won 2–0.

In 2024, Filipe Luís won his first title as Flamengo head coach by defeating Atlético Mineiro in the Copa do Brasil finals. The next year, he went on to win the 2025 Copa Libertadores by defeating Palmeiras 1–0 in the final match, becoming the ninth person to win the trophy as both player and manager. On 29 December 2025, he extended his contract with Flamengo until 31 December 2027. However, on 3 March 2026, Flamengo announced that Luís would no longer serve as head coach of the team, terminating his tenure shortly after an 8–0 victory over Madureira in the Campeonato Carioca semifinal.

=== Monaco ===
On 6 July 2026, Luís signed with Ligue 1 side Monaco.

== Personal life ==
All four of Filipe Luís' grandparents were European immigrants, who came to Santa Catarina. His paternal grandfather left Poland during World War I. He is also of Italian ancestry.

In 2014, Filipe Luís' second child, a daughter named Sara, was born. He also fathered a son the previous year, Tiago.

== Career statistics ==
=== Club ===
Appearances and goals by club, season and competition
Club	Season	League			State league		National cup (Note: Includes Copa del Rey, FA Cup and Copa do Brasil.)		Continental		Other		Total	
Club	Season	Division	Apps	Goals	Apps	Goals	Apps	Goals	Apps	Goals	Apps	Goals	Apps	Goals
Figueirense	2003	Série A	7	1	12 (Note: Appearance(s) in Campeonato Catarinense)	0	3	1	—		—		22	2
Figueirense	2004	Série A	17	0	13	3	2	0	—		—		32	3
Figueirense	Total		24	1	25	3	5	0	—		—		54	5
Real Madrid B (loan)	2005–06	Segunda División	37	0	—		—		—		—		37	0
Deportivo La Coruña (loan)	2006–07	La Liga	19	0	—		7	1	0	0	—		26	1
Deportivo La Coruña (loan)	2007–08	La Liga	33	1	—		2	0	0	0	—		35	1
Deportivo La Coruña (loan)	Total		52	1	—		9	1	0	0	—		61	2
Deportivo La Coruña	2008–09	La Liga	38	2	—		2	0	10 (Note: Appearance(s) in UEFA Europa League)	0	—		50	2
Deportivo La Coruña	2009–10	La Liga	21	3	—		3	1	0	0	—		24	4
Deportivo La Coruña	Total		59	5	—		5	1	10	0	—		74	6
Atlético Madrid	2010–11	La Liga	27	1	—		6	0	3	0	—		36	1
Atlético Madrid	2011–12	La Liga	36	0	—		1	0	16	0	—		53	0
Atlético Madrid	2012–13	La Liga	32	1	—		6	2	3	0	1 (Note: Appearance in UEFA Super Cup)	0	42	3
Atlético Madrid	2013–14	La Liga	32	0	—		5	0	10 (Note: Appearance(s) in UEFA Champions League)	1	2 (Note: Appearance(s) in Supercopa de España)	0	49	1
Atlético Madrid	Total		127	2	—		18	2	32	1	3	0	180	5
Chelsea	2014–15	Premier League	15	0	—		1	0	5	0	5 (Note: Appearance(s) in Football League Cup)	1	26	1
Atlético Madrid	2015–16	La Liga	32	1	—		3	0	10	0	—		45	1
Atlético Madrid	2016–17	La Liga	34	3	—		4	0	10	0	—		48	3
Atlético Madrid	2017–18	La Liga	20	1	—		0	0	8 (Note: Six appearances in UEFA Champions League, two appearances in UEFA Europa League)	0	—		28	1
Atlético Madrid	2018–19	La Liga	27	2	—		0	0	5	0	—		32	2
Atlético Madrid	Total		113	7	—		7	0	33	0	—		153	7
Flamengo	2019	Série A	16	0	—		0	0	5 (Note: Appearance(s) in Copa Libertadores)	0	2 (Note: Appearance(s) in FIFA Club World Cup)	0	23	0
Flamengo	2020	Série A	31	2	8 (Note: Appearance(s) in Campeonato Carioca)	1	2	0	5	0	3 (Note: Two appearances in Recopa Sudamericana, one appearance in Supercopa do Brasil)	0	49	3
Flamengo	2021	Série A	22	0	5	0	4	0	11	0	1 (Note: Appearance in Supercopa do Brasil)	0	43	0
Flamengo	2022	Série A	10	0	10	1	8	0	10	0	1	0	39	1
Flamengo	2023	Série A	10	0	4	0	2	0	5	0	0	0	21	0
Flamengo	Total		89	2	27	2	16	0	36	0	7	0	175	4
Career total			516	18	52	5	61	5	116	1	15	1	760	30

=== International ===
Appearances and goals by national team and year
National team	Year	Apps	Goals
Brazil	2009	1	0
Brazil	2010	0	0
Brazil	2011	0	0
Brazil	2012	0	0
Brazil	2013	3	0
Brazil	2014	6	0
Brazil	2015	11	1
Brazil	2016	8	1
Brazil	2017	2	0
Brazil	2018	7	0
Brazil	2019	6	0
Total		44	2

Brazil score listed first, score column indicates score after each Filipe Luís goal.

List of international goals scored by Filipe Luís
No.	Date	Venue	Opponent	Score	Result	Competition
1	17 November 2015	Itaipava Arena Fonte Nova, Salvador, Brazil	Peru	3–0	3–0	2018 FIFA World Cup qualification
2	6 October 2016	Arena das Dunas, Natal, Brazil	Bolivia	3–0	5–0	2018 FIFA World Cup qualification

== Managerial statistics ==
As of 21 November 2026

Managerial record by team and tenure
Team	Nat.	From	To	Record								Ref
Team	Nat.	From	To	G	W	D	L	GF	GA	GD	Win %	Ref
Flamengo U20	(Brazil)	13 June 2024	30 September 2024	27	17	4	6	47	24	+23	62.96	
Flamengo	(Brazil)	30 September 2024	3 March 2026	101	64	22	15	186	71	+115	63.37	
Monaco	(France)	6 July 2026	present	16	9	5	2	28	16	+12	56.25	
Career total				141	89	31	21	261	111	+150	63.12	—

== Honours ==
=== Player ===
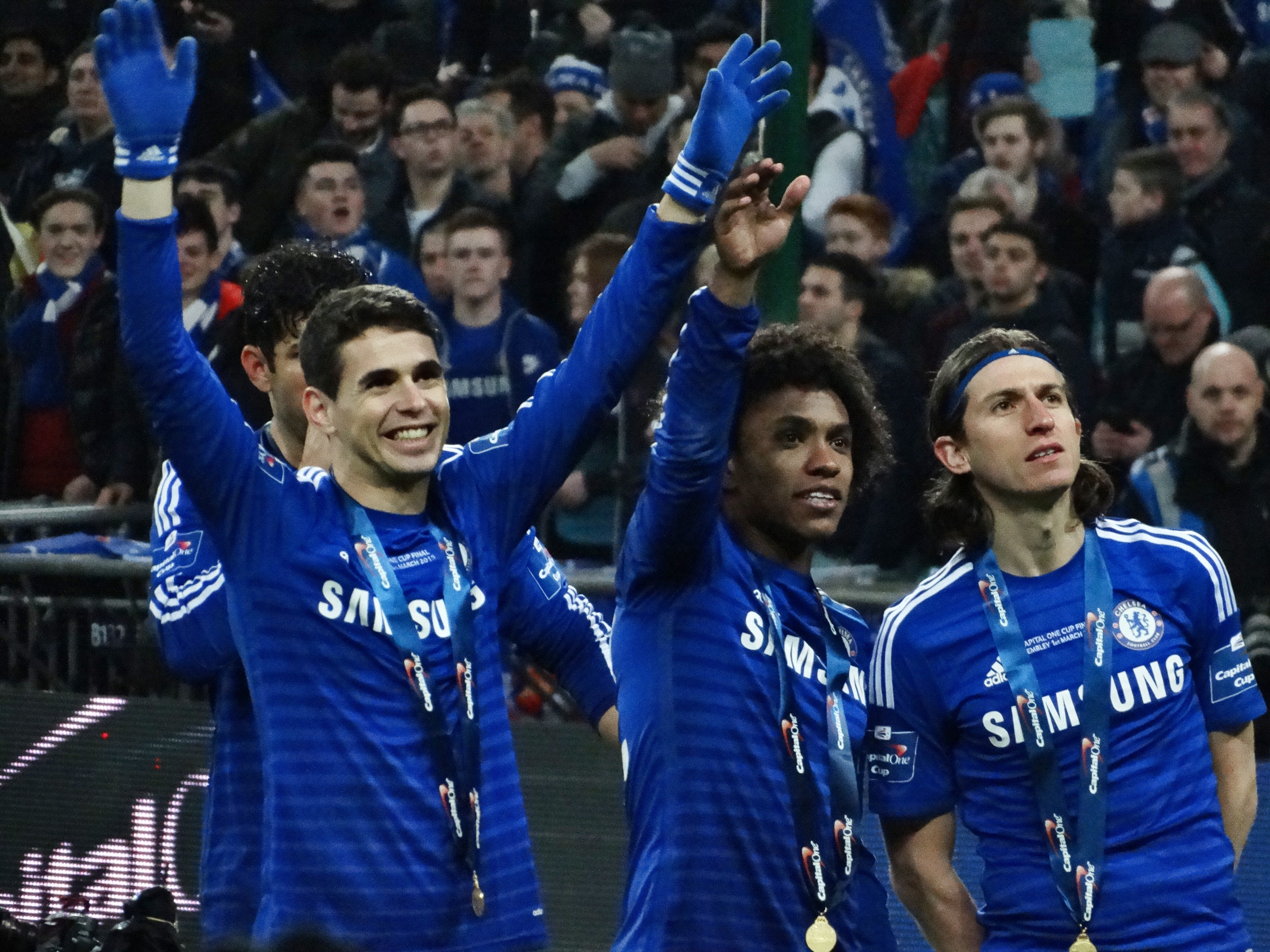
Filipe Luís (right) celebrating Chelsea's victory in the 2015 League Cup, alongside compatriots Oscar and Willian

Figueirense

- Campeonato Catarinense: 2003, 2004

Atlético Madrid

- La Liga: 2013–14
- Copa del Rey: 2012–13
- UEFA Europa League: 2011–12, 2017–18
- UEFA Super Cup: 2012, 2018
- UEFA Champions League runner-up: 2013–14, 2015–16

Chelsea

- Premier League: 2014–15
- Football League Cup: 2014–15

Flamengo

- Campeonato Brasileiro Série A: 2019, 2020
- Copa do Brasil: 2022
- Supercopa do Brasil: 2020, 2021
- Copa Libertadores: 2019, 2022
- Recopa Sudamericana: 2020
- Campeonato Carioca: 2020, 2021
- FIFA Club World Cup runner-up: 2019

Brazil U20

- FIFA World Youth Championship third place: 2005

Brazil

- Copa América: 2019
- FIFA Confederations Cup: 2013

Individual

- La Liga Team of the Season: 2013–14
- FIFPro World XI: Fifth Team 2014
- ESM Team of the Season: 2015–16
- UEFA La Liga Team of The Season: 2015–16, 2016–17
- Campeonato Brasileiro Série A Team of the Year: 2019
- Campeonato Carioca Team of the Year: 2020, 2021
- IFFHS Men's CONMEBOL Team: 2021

=== Manager ===
Flamengo

- FIFA Challenger Cup: 2025
- FIFA Derby of the Americas: 2025
- Copa Libertadores: 2025
- Campeonato Brasileiro Série A: 2025
- Copa do Brasil: 2024
- Supercopa do Brasil: 2025
- Campeonato Carioca: 2025

Flamengo U20

- Under-20 Intercontinental Cup: 2024

Flamengo U17

- Copa Rio U-17: 2024

Individual

- Copa do Brasil Best Head Coach: 2024
- Campeonato Carioca Best Head Coach: 2025
- Troféu Mesa Redonda Coach of the Year: 2025
- South American Coach of the Year: 2025
