= Liminha =

Liminha is a nickname. It may refer to:

- Liminha (footballer, born 1930) (1930–1985), Oswaldo Luiz Moreira, Brazilian footballer
- Liminha (footballer, born 1944) (1944–2013), João Crevelim, Brazilian footballer and football manager
- Liminha (footballer, born 1951) (1951–2000), Darcy do Rocio Fortunato da Lima, Brazilian footballer
- Liminha (musician) (born 1951), Arnolpho Lima Filho, Brazilian musician and producer
