= Arturo Díaz (footballer) =

Chilean footballer (1940–1985)

Personal information
- Full name: Arturo del Carmen Díaz Muñoz
- Date of birth: 4 November 1940
- Place of birth: Coquimbo, Chile
- Date of death: 13 November 1985 (aged 45)
- Place of death: Tegucigalpa, Honduras
- Position: Forward

Youth career
- Independiente Vicuña
- Unión Farola
- Coquimbo Unido

Senior career*
Years	Team	Apps	(Gls)
1959–1965	Coquimbo Unido		
1966	Unión Española		
1966	→ Colo-Colo (loan)		
1967	Ferroviarios		
1968	Atlético Indio		
- Federal
- Campamento

Managerial career
- Campamento
- Honduran Artillery Battalion
- * Club domestic league appearances and goals

Arturo del Carmen Díaz Muñoz (4 November 1940 – 13 November 1985), more popularly known as Canilla Díaz (Shin Díaz), was a Chilean football player and manager who played as a forward.

== Early years ==
Díaz was born in Coquimbo, a port city in Chile, to Floridor Segundo Díaz Navea, a ship stevedore and amateur water polo player, and Clementina Alicia Muñoz Ávalos, a food peddler. He grew up alongside his five siblings (Jery, Mario, Carlos, Lilian and Magaly) and his two nephews (Alicia and Tito) who were officially adopted as Floridor and Clementina's children.

As a child, Díaz played for both Independiente Vicuña, a club based in the street where he lived, and Unión Farola, before joining Coquimbo Unido.

== Club career ==
=== In Chile ===
Díaz made his professional debut playing for Coquimbo Unido in the 1959 Segunda División, facing Deportivo San Fernando and, two matchdays later, he scored his first goal against Green Cross. The matches with the traditional opponent, Deportes La Serena, are well remembered, according to the former footballer Hernán Godoy. Along with Coquimbo Unido, he got promotion to the Primera División, the first title for the club, after winning the 1962 Segunda División, scoring the winning goal in the last matchday versus Universidad Técnica del Estado.

He stayed with Coquimbo Unido in Primera División, even making an appearance in the cover of the renowned Chilean sports magazine Estadio, until 1965, when the club was relegated to the second category. So, he switched to Unión Española for the 1966 season on a deal for 43,000 Chilean escudos, being loaned to Colo-Colo for a summer tournament. The next year, he played for Ferroviarios, his last club in Chile.

=== In Honduras ===
In 1968, he moved to Honduras and joined Atlético Indio under the managing of Carlos "Zorro" Padilla in the Liga Nacional de Fútbol Profesional. In the club, he coincided with José Domingo "Yuyo" Tróchez, a current Honduran football commentator. Then he played for Federal, coinciding again with Tróchez, and Club Campamento, becoming the team goalscorer en 1976 with eight goals. He retired at the end of the 1970s according to the former merchant sailor from Coquimbo, Luis Rivera, with whom Díaz met in Tegucigalpa.

== Coaching career ==
At the same time, he was a player of Club Campamento where he was the team manager. Next, he worked as the coach of an amateur team from the Honduran Army. Then, he coached the first, the third and the fourth team of the Honduran Artillery Battalion until his death in 1985 due to a virulent meningitis.

== Personal life ==
Díaz was nicknamed Canilla (Shin) due to the fact that his legs were very thin, according to his fellow Manuel Ñurdo Díaz.

He made his home in Honduras and married Francis Galo, a nurse, in 1968, with whom he had three children: Cristian Arturo (born 1969, deceased), Francisco Segundo (born 1971) and Francis Jackeline (born 1972).

To his death, his body was escorted and glorified by Armed Forces of Honduras and laid to rest in the Santa Anita cemetery.

His Chilean family just met his Honduran family in 2021 through a video call, due to the fact that Díaz's granddaughter, Julieth Diaz, accidentally discovered an article on the internet about his grandfather and made contact with the author, Felipe Fernández.

== Honours ==
Coquimbo Unido

- Segunda División: 1962

== Legacy ==
He was considered a historical player of Coquimbo Unido, the branch office in Valparaíso is called "Arturo Canilla Díaz".

Since 2018, an initiative motivated by both Humberto Cuéllar, a well-known fan of Coquimbo Unido and TV panelist, and Mario "Loco" Rodríguez, a former goalkeeper and coach of Coquimbo Unido Academy, looks for honoring Díaz by naming a street or making a monument in Coquimbo.
