= Benê (footballer, born 1944) =

Brazilian footballer

Personal information
- Full name: Benedito Carlos de Souza
- Date of birth: 13 May 1944 (age 82)
- Place of birth: São Paulo, Brazil
- Position: Forward

Youth career
- 1961–1962: Corinthians

Senior career*
Years	Team	Apps	(Gls)
1963–1971	Corinthians	161	(50)
1965	→ XV de Piracicaba (loan)		
1965–1966	→ Goiânia (loan)		
1966	→ EC Corinthians (loan)		
1966	→ América-SP (loan)		
1967	→ Portuguesa (loan)		
1968	→ EC Corinthians (loan)		
1971	Internacional	9	(2)
1972	Portuguesa		
1972	Ferroviária		
1973	Pontagrossense		
1973	Barcelona	0	(0)
1973	Athletico Paranaense	18	(1)
1974–1975	Saad		
1976	XV de Piracicaba		
1977	Velo Clube		
1978–1979	Coquimbo Unido	51	(19)
1980	Aviación	20	(6)

Managerial career
- EC São Bernardo (youth)
- Palestra SB (youth)
- * Club domestic league appearances and goals

Benedito Carlos de Souza (born 13 May 1944), known as Benê, is a Brazilian former footballer who played as a forward for clubs in Brazil and Chile.

== Playing career ==
Born in São Paulo, Brazil, Benê made his professional debut with Corinthians in a 4–3 loss against Londrina in 1963. After playing on loan at XV de Piracicaba, Goiânia, EC Corinthians, América-SP and Portuguesa, he permanently played for Corinthians between 1967 and 1971, making one hundred sixty one appearances and scoring fifty goals.

As a player of Corinthians, he won the 1971 Torneio do Povo and gained renown after scoring the draw goal against the classic rival, São Paulo, in the 1967 Campeonato Paulista, making they not win the championship.

After his stint with Corinthians, he also played for two another important clubs, Internacional and Athletico Paranaense, in addition to Portuguesa, Ferroviária, Pontagrossense, XV de Piracicaba, with whom he was the runner-up of the 1976 Campeonato Paulista, Saad and Velo Clube. In 1973, he also had a brief stint with Spanish side Barcelona.

Ending his career in Brazil, he moved to Chile in 1978 and tried to sign with Everton de Viña del Mar, but he finally signed with Coquimbo Unido in the top division alongside his compatriot Torino. A year later, another Brazilian player, Liminha, joined the club recommended by the last one. They three are well remembered by his seasons together in the squad.

In 1980, he switched to Aviación in the same division, what was his last club.

== Coaching career ==
Benê has worked as coach at youth level for clubs such as EC São Bernardo and Palestra SB. With the last one, he won the 1992 Campeonato Paulista de Juniores da 2º Divisão, where took part the former Brazil international Zé Roberto as a player, using the nickname of Cacá.

Benê made his home in Sorocaba and has worked as coach for football academies.

== Honours ==
Corinthians

- Torneio do Povo: 1971
