= Anthony Taylor (referee) =

English football referee (born 1978)

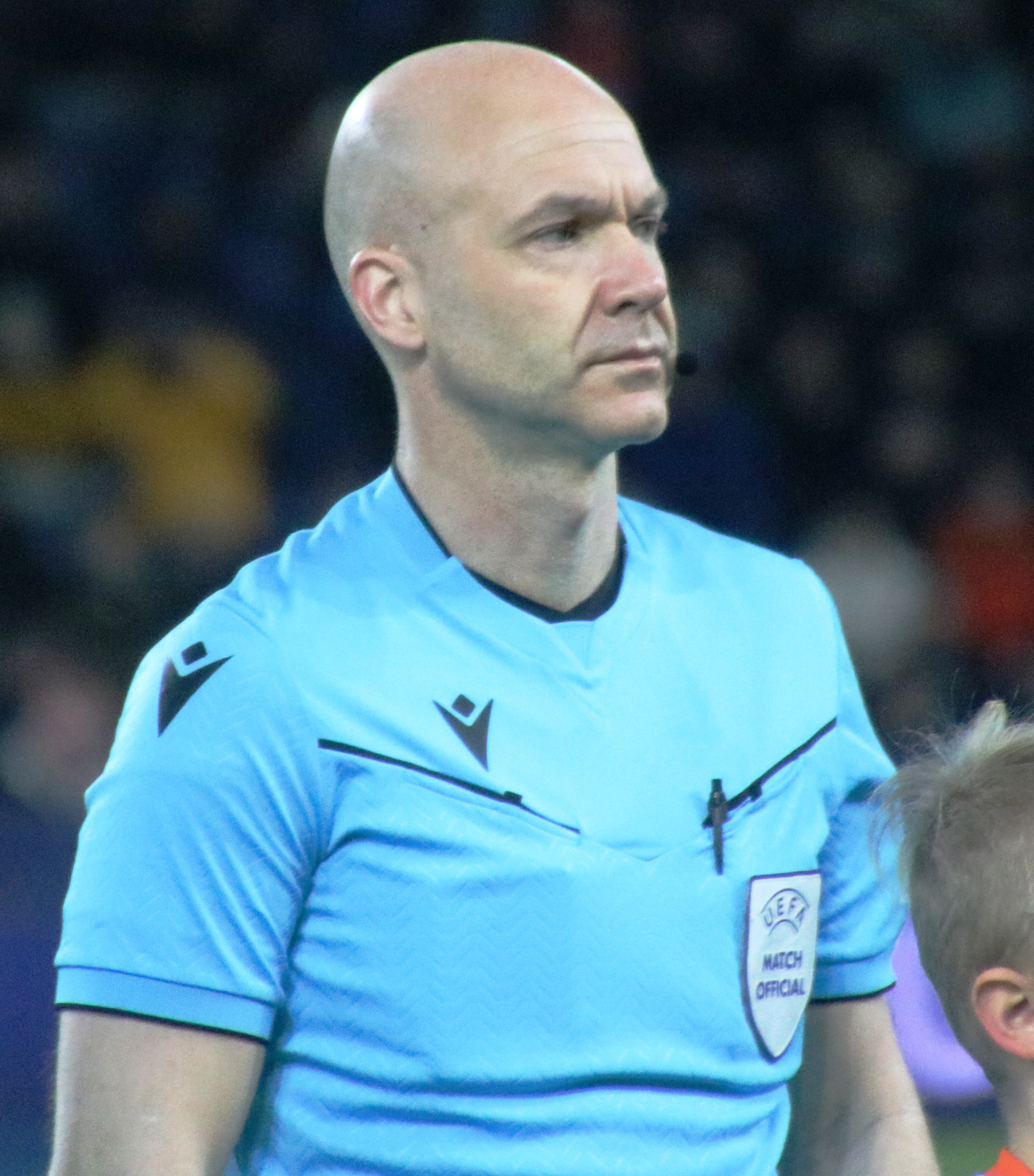
- Taylor in 2025
- Born: 20 October 1978 (age 48); Wythenshawe, Manchester, England

Domestic
Years	League	Role
2002–2004	Northern Premier League	Referee
2004–2006	Football Conference	Referee
2006–2010	The Football League	Referee
2010–2026	Premier League	Referee

International
Years	League	Role
2013–2026	FIFA listed	Referee

Anthony Taylor (born 20 October 1978) is an English former professional football referee. In 2010, he was promoted to the list of Select Group Referees who officiate primarily in the Premier League, and in 2013 became a listed referee for FIFA allowing him to referee European and international matches. In 2015, he officiated the Football League Cup final at Wembley Stadium when Chelsea defeated Tottenham Hotspur 2–0. Taylor returned to Wembley later that year to officiate the Community Shield as Arsenal beat Chelsea 1–0. He refereed the 2017 and 2020 FA Cup finals, both between Chelsea and Arsenal; Arsenal won on both occasions 2–1. Upon the selection, he became the first man to referee a second FA Cup final since Arthur Kingscott in 1901.

== Early life ==
Taylor was a student at Altrincham Grammar School for Boys.

== Career ==
=== Early career ===
Taylor started refereeing in the Northern Premier League in 2002, progressing to officiate in the Conference North in 2004. He was appointed to the Football League referees' list at the start of the 2006–07 season and his first appointment was a 0–0 draw between Wrexham and Peterborough United in a League Two match in August 2006. In November 2006, he refereed an England under-19s international friendly match against Switzerland under-19s at Gresty Road, the home of Crewe Alexandra; England won 3–2.

=== Professional career ===
Taylor's first Premier League appointment was a February 2010 encounter between Fulham and Portsmouth, which Fulham won 1–0. He refereed one more game in the top-flight during that season before being promoted to the League's list of Select Group of Referees for 2010–11. In September 2010 he took charge of his fourth Premier League match, contested by Blackburn Rovers and Fulham. The match ended 1–1.

Taylor sent off three players in his first game of the 2011–12 season. Middlesbrough won 1–0 at Leeds United in a fixture which saw Jonny Howson and Max Gradel of Leeds and Boro's Tony McMahon dismissed, all for second bookable offences. Taylor refereed a total of 34 matches that season and dismissed eight players in total, including the three at Leeds. Taylor became a FIFA listed referee on 1 January 2013, making him eligible to officiate UEFA European and FIFA international competitive games. In May 2013 he was fourth official to Andre Marriner for the FA Cup Final. On the opening day of the 2013–14 season Taylor refereed Aston Villa's 3–1 victory away at Arsenal. He awarded Villa two penalties and dismissed Arsenal's Laurent Koscielny for two bookable offences. Arsène Wenger described Taylor's officiating of the match as "stubborn", while Villa manager Paul Lambert said that he thought the official "had a good game".

On 1 March 2015, Taylor was the referee for the Football League Cup final between Chelsea and Tottenham Hotspur. Taylor refereed both the 2015 FA Community Shield and the 2015 Football League Cup final. On 26 April 2017, Taylor was chosen to be the main referee for the 2017 FA Cup final. On 26 May 2018 he was chosen to officiate the 2018 EFL Championship play-off final. On 16 September 2020, Taylor was chosen to be the main referee for the 2020 UEFA Super Cup.

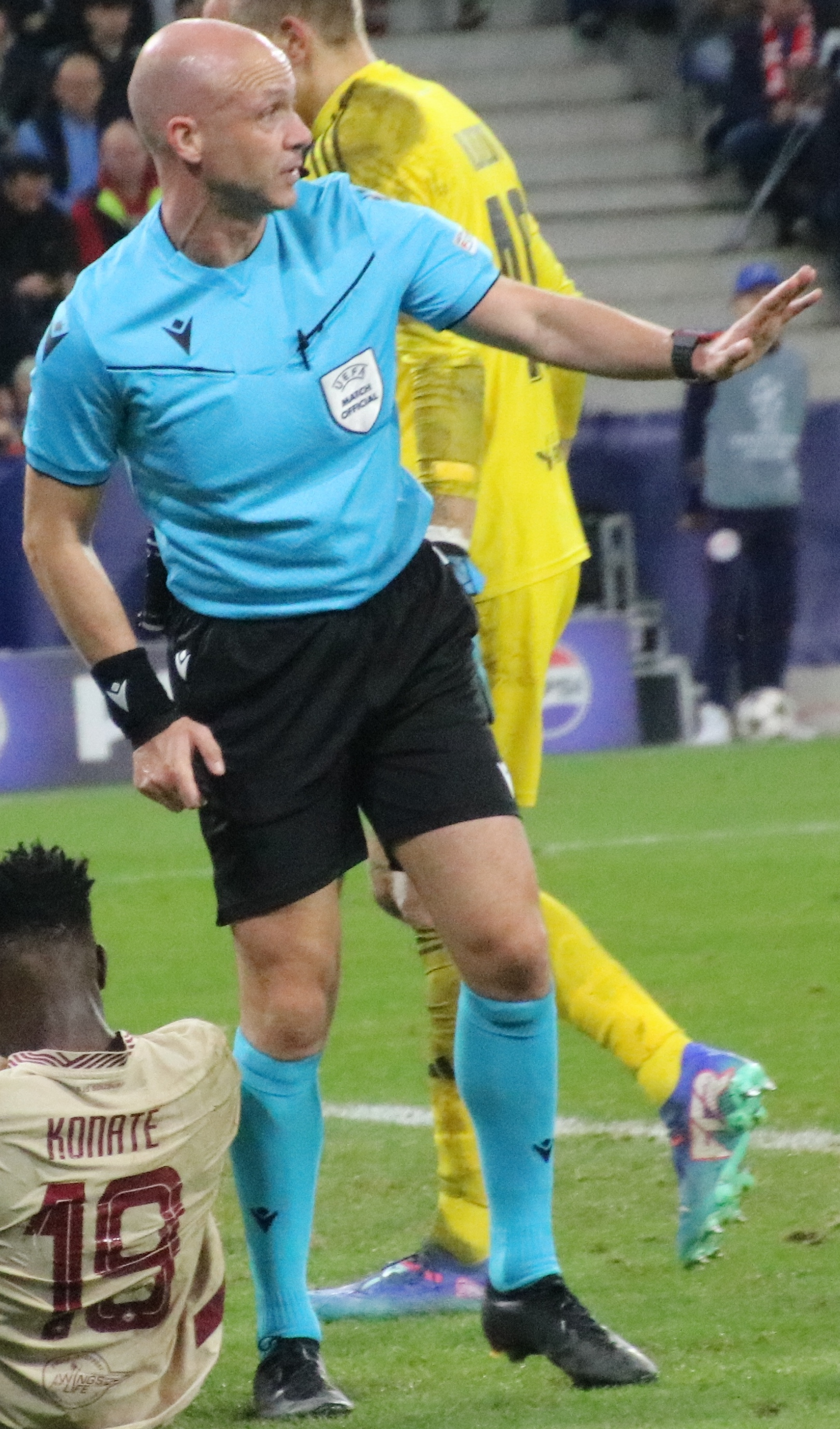
Anthony Taylor in 2024.

On 12 June 2021, Taylor officiated a UEFA Euro 2020 group stage match between Finland and Denmark. In the 43rd minute, Danish midfielder Christian Eriksen collapsed on the pitch and required emergency treatment on the pitch before being transferred to a local hospital and stabilised. Taylor was praised for his calm but quick reaction to the situation, signalling for medical attention within seconds. The match was resumed later in the day once it became clear Eriksen's condition had improved. Taylor's earlier training in the prison service at HMP Manchester was cited as helpful for the situation by mentor Chris Foy. In October 2021, Taylor was chosen to referee the 2021 UEFA Nations League Final between Spain and France.

In a May 2022 FIFA pronouncement, Taylor was listed as one of six English officials to oversee matches at that November and December's World Cup. The list also included referee Michael Oliver and four compatriot assistant referees—Simon Bennett, Gary Beswick, Stuart Burt, and Adam Nunn.

On 11 February 2023, Taylor refereed the 2022 FIFA Club World Cup final, with Real Madrid defeating Al-Hilal 5–3. In May 2023, UEFA announced Taylor as the referee for the 2023 UEFA Europa League final, with Gary Beswick and Adam Nunn as assistants, and Michael Oliver as fourth official. In the final between Roma and Sevilla on 31 May, Taylor pulled out 14 yellow cards, a record for a Europa League game, include one against AS Roma manager José Mourinho. In the 75th minute, Taylor initially awarded a penalty to Sevilla for a foul on Lucas Ocampos, but overturned his decision after a VAR review. He also notably denied AS Roma an 81st-minute penalty for a handball against Sevilla's Fernando, determined after using VAR that the player's arm was naturally positioned by his side. After the match, Mourinho criticized Taylor in a news conference, later confronted him in the car park and swearing in both English and Italian. On 1 June, Taylor and his family were shouted at by Roma fans in Budapest Airport as the airport security escorted them away.

In July 2024, Taylor was chosen to referee a knockout stage match between Spain and Germany. In the match, he denied Germany a penalty after defender Marc Cucurella blocked Jamal Musiala's shot with his outstretched arm. This action was contested by Germany's players and the manager Julian Nagelsmann. UEFA later admitted Taylor's error in an official report, stating "the defender stops the shot on goal with his arm, which is not very close to the body, making itself bigger, so a penalty kick should have been awarded”. On 14 September, Taylor pulled out 14 yellow cards in the match between Chelsea and Bournemouth, a record-breaking number of cards in a single Premier League match. He was then demoted to fourth official by the Premier League.

He was selected back to the World Cup in 2026, become the main referee for the group stage match between Senegal and Iraq. He also was the main referee for the round of 16 knockout match between Portugal and Spain. He announced his retirement from elite refereeing on 21 July 2026.

== Post-retirement ==
In August 2026, Taylor was appointed director of elite refereeing at the Turkish Football Federation. In the role, he was tasked with leading the strategic and technical development of elite refereeing in Turkey, supporting the federation's efforts to strengthen its refereeing programme in line with UEFA and FIFA standards.

== Statistics ==
Season	Games	Total (yellow card)	(yellow card) per game	Total (red card)	(red card) per game
2006–07	26	78	3.00	5	0.19
2007–08	36	105	2.92	10	0.28
2008–09	38	91	2.39	4	0.11
2009–10	36	92	2.56	8	0.22
2010–11	32	118	3.69	12	0.36
2011–12	34	106	3.12	8	0.24
2012–13	35	89	2.54	6	0.17
2013–14	31	102	3.29	3	0.10
2014–15	39	160	4.10	9	0.23
2015–16	44	147	3.34	6	0.14
2016–17	41	161	3.93	5	0.12
2017–18	40	147	3.68	6	0.15
2018–19	50	175	3.50	10	0.20
2019–20	48	202	4.21	9	0.19
2020–21	42	136	3.23	4	0.10
2021–22	44	165	3.75	7	0.16
2022–23	43	166	3.86	6	0.14
2023–24	49	214	4.37	9	0.18
2024–25	49	165	3.37	12	0.24
2025–26	49	192	3.92	5	0.1

Statistics for all competitions. No records are available prior to 2006–07.

== Major matches refereed ==
Date	Match	Tournament	Ref
24 September 2020	Bayern Munich vs. Sevilla (2–1)	2020 UEFA Super Cup	
10 October 2021	Spain vs. France (1–2)	2021 UEFA Nations League final	
11 February 2023	Real Madrid vs. Al-Hilal (5–3)	2022 FIFA Club World Cup final	
31 May 2023	Sevilla vs. Roma (1–1; 4–1 on penalties)	2023 UEFA Europa League final	

== See also ==
- List of football referees

Sporting positions (England) Anthony Taylor
Preceded by (France) Stéphanie Frappart	2020 UEFA Super Cup Referee	Succeeded by (Russia) Sergei Karasev
Preceded by (Spain) Alberto Undiano Mallenco	2021 UEFA Nations League Final Referee	Succeeded by (Germany) Felix Zwayer
Preceded by (Australia) Chris Beath	2022 FIFA Club World Cup Final Referee	Succeeded by (Poland) Szymon Marciniak
Preceded by (Slovenia) Slavko Vinčić	2023 UEFA Europa League Final Referee	Succeeded by (Romania) István Kovács
