= 2015 Football League Cup final =

- Match programme cover
- Event: 2014–15 Football League Cup
| Chelsea | Tottenham Hotspur |
| 2 | 0 |
- Date: 1 March 2015
- Venue: Wembley Stadium, London
- Man of the Match: John Terry (Chelsea)
- Referee: Anthony Taylor (Cheshire)
- Attendance: 89,294
- Weather: Rain

The 2015 Football League Cup final was a football match that took place on 1 March 2015 at Wembley Stadium, London. It was the final match of the 2014–15 Football League Cup, the 55th season of the Football League Cup, a competition for the 92 teams in the Premier League and the Football League.

It was contested by Chelsea and Tottenham Hotspur in a repeat of the 2008 Football League Cup final, which the latter team won. Chelsea won 2–0 in the 2015 final, with a goal from captain John Terry at the end of the first half, and a second from Diego Costa in the 56th minute. It was Chelsea's fifth League Cup win, and their first silverware in the second managerial spell of José Mourinho at the club. Chelsea qualified for the next season's UEFA Europa League by winning the match, but eventually qualified for the UEFA Champions League by winning the Premier League. The Europa League place went to Liverpool, who finished sixth in the Premier League.

Mourinho expressed delight in winning another trophy in his career, while Terry spoke of optimism for Chelsea's future prospects. Tottenham manager Mauricio Pochettino declared pride in his side despite their defeat.

== Background ==
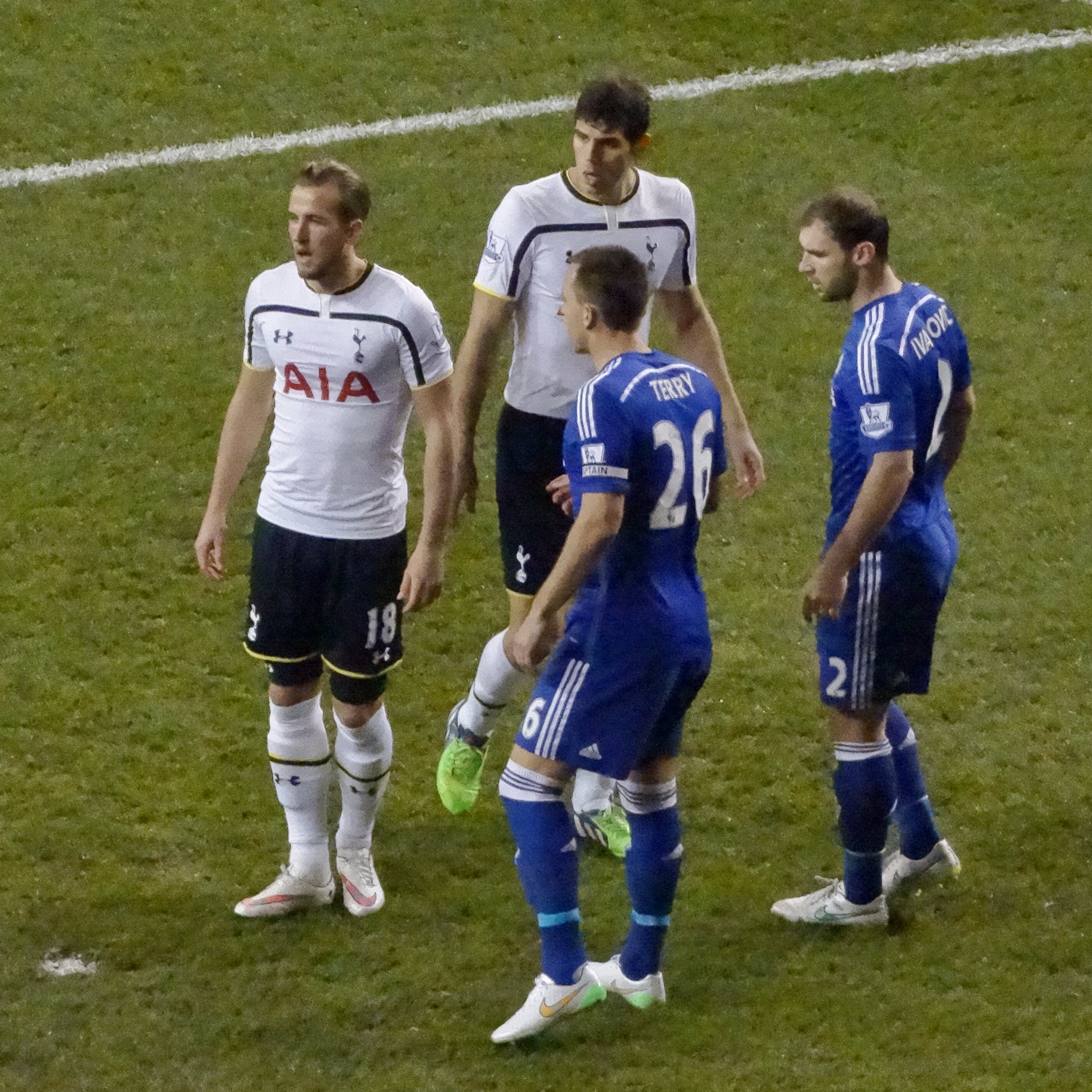
Tottenham defeated Chelsea 5–3 in the Premier League on 1 January 2015. Pictured are Tottenham's Harry Kane and Federico Fazio, with Chelsea's John Terry and Branislav Ivanović

Chelsea were playing in their seventh League Cup final, having won four, most recently in 2007. Their most recent appearance in the final was the first at Wembley, which they lost in 2008 to Tottenham. The game was Chelsea's first domestic cup final since their victory in the 2012 FA Cup final. Incumbent Chelsea manager José Mourinho was in charge in their League Cup wins in 2005 and 2007, and squad members Petr Čech, John Terry and Didier Drogba played in both finals, with the latter scoring in both victories. All three also played in the 2008 defeat by Tottenham.

Tottenham were making their eighth appearance in the final, having won four previous times, last of which was in 2008. The 2008 final was the first at Wembley and was won against Chelsea. Tottenham's most recent appearance was a defeat against Manchester United in a penalty shootout the following year. Of their squad in the 2014–15 season, captain Younes Kaboul was an extra-time substitute in their 2008 victory, while Aaron Lennon – on loan at Everton at the time of the 2015 final – started that match and the defeat in 2009.

The two teams also played at the old Wembley in the 1967 FA Cup final, which Tottenham won 2–1. Tottenham's most recent appearance at Wembley was also against Chelsea, a 5–1 defeat in an FA Cup semi-final in 2012.

By the time of the final, Chelsea and Tottenham had already played each other twice during the league season. On 3 December 2014, Chelsea hosted a 3–0 win, with goals from Eden Hazard, Didier Drogba and substitute Loïc Rémy, despite missing leading scorer Diego Costa through suspension. Tottenham won the reverse fixture 5–3 only 29 days later, with Harry Kane scoring twice among further goals from Danny Rose, Andros Townsend (penalty) and Nacer Chadli.

== Route to the final ==
=== Chelsea ===
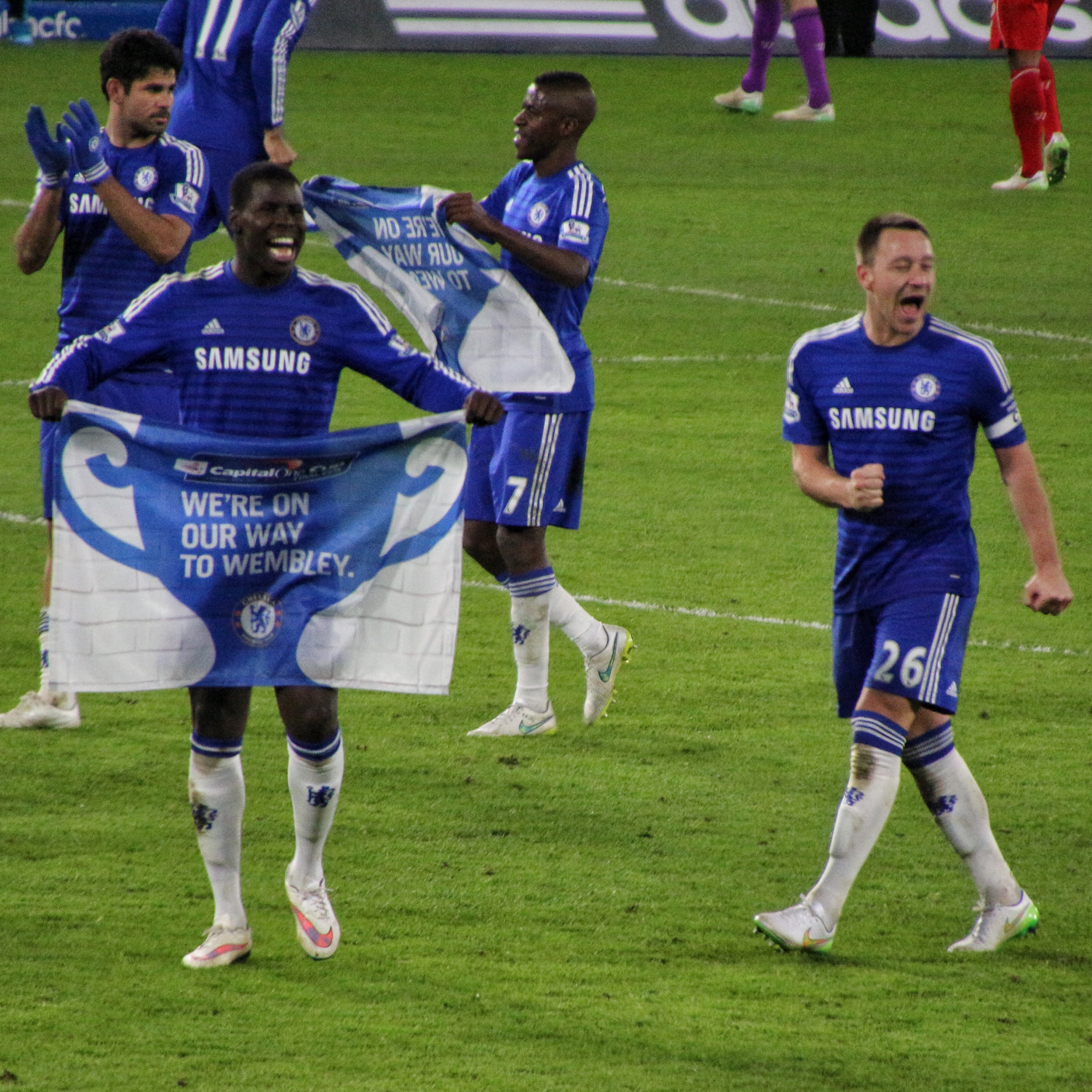
Chelsea players celebrating their semi-final victory. From left to right: Diego Costa, Kurt Zouma, Ramires and John Terry

Chelsea, of the Premier League, began their League Cup campaign in the third round, where they were drawn at home against Bolton Wanderers of the Championship. Defender Kurt Zouma, making his debut, opened the scoring, but Bolton equalised six minutes later through a Matt Mills header. Ten minutes after the start of the second half, Oscar put Chelsea back into the lead and they won 2–1, dominating the match with 28 shots to Bolton's 3.

In the fourth round, Chelsea travelled to the New Meadow to face Shrewsbury Town of League Two. Three minutes after play resumed from a goalless first half, Didier Drogba's half-volley gave Chelsea the lead, but Shrewsbury gained an equaliser from substitute Andy Mangan. With nine minutes to play, Chelsea regained the advantage when Shrewsbury defender Jermaine Grandison deflected a shot from Willian.

Chelsea again were the away team to a lower opponent in the quarter-finals, facing Derby County of the Championship. In the first half, Eden Hazard gave Chelsea the lead, later doubled by a Filipe Luís free kick, the full-back's first for Chelsea. Craig Bryson halved the deficit for Derby, but soon afterwards defender Jake Buxton was sent off for a foul on Loïc Rémy and André Schürrle scored the final goal of a 3–1 Chelsea win. In the semi-final, Chelsea beat Liverpool 2–1 on aggregate after Branislav Ivanović scored the winning goal in the first half of extra time in the second leg, heading in Willian's free kick.

=== Tottenham Hotspur ===
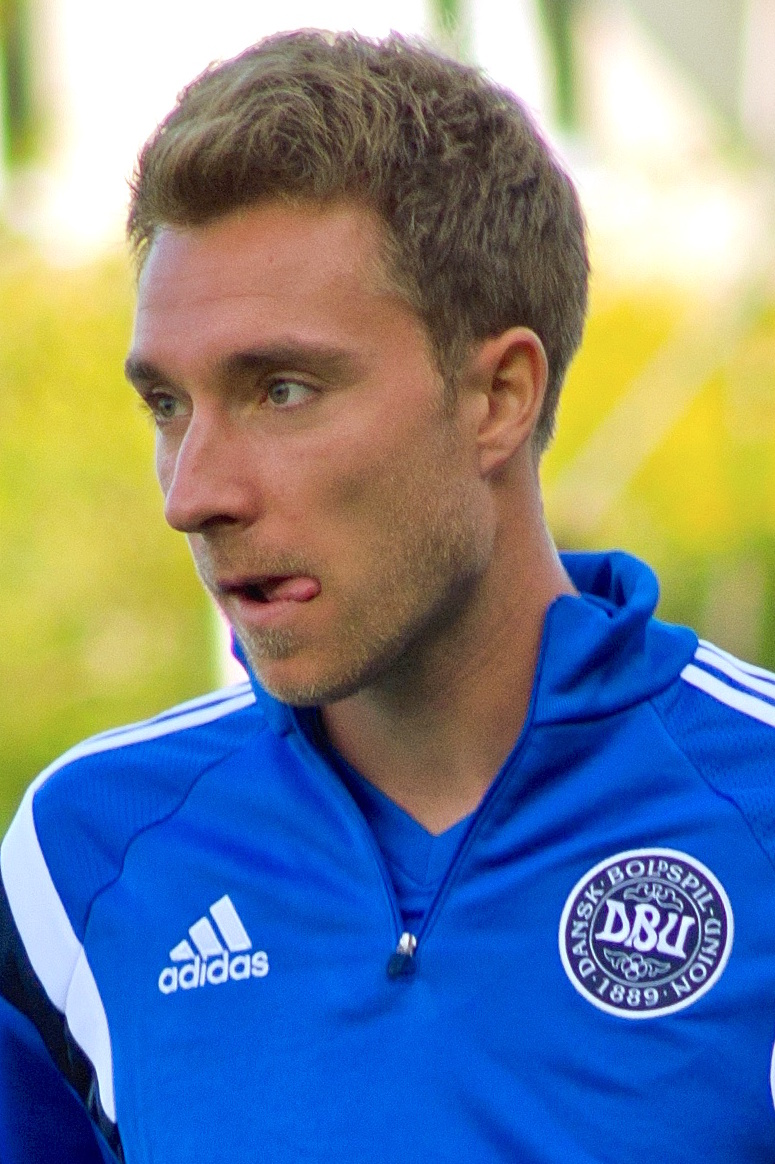
Christian Eriksen scored twice in Tottenham's semi-final win over Sheffield United

Tottenham, also of the Premier League, began by facing Nottingham Forest at White Hart Lane. After a goalless first half, Jorge Grant gave the visitors from the Championship the lead in the 65th minute. Substitute Ryan Mason equalised six minutes later, and Spurs eventually won 3–1 after two late goals from Roberto Soldado and another substitute, Harry Kane.

Tottenham hosted another second-tier opponent in the fourth round, Brighton & Hove Albion, and went into the lead through Erik Lamela, a half-time replacement for Aaron Lennon. Kane later confirmed a 2–0 victory.

In the quarter-finals, Tottenham again played at home, against top-flight Newcastle United. Away goalkeeper Jak Alnwick made a mistake which allowed Nabil Bentaleb to give Spurs a half-time lead. Nacer Chadli doubled it 36 seconds into the second half. Kane and his replacement Soldado also scored in the 4–0 victory. Tottenham's semi-final against League One club Sheffield United started with a 1–0 home win, Andros Townsend converting a penalty won by Jay McEveley's handball. A week later in the second leg at Bramall Lane, Tottenham doubled their aggregate lead with Christian Eriksen's free kick, but in the second half 18-year-old substitute Ché Adams scored twice to equalise the aggregate. With two minutes remaining, Eriksen scored his second to put Tottenham into the final.

== Match ==
=== Pre-match ===
Tottenham were eliminated from the last 32 of the 2014–15 UEFA Europa League by Fiorentina three days before the final, leading manager Mauricio Pochettino to say that the team needed to recover quickly.

Chelsea manager José Mourinho used his pre-match interview to state that his previous wins in the tournament had changed the way that clubs approach the League Cup: "Lots of teams have followed us since then when we took the League Cup as a real competition, as a real challenge. It is a big competition." He separated the final from the league season, saying, "I don't think if we win the cup final we will win the league, or if we lose it we will lose the league." He refused to discuss the suspension of Matić, dismissing it with "If I speak to you about that, I promise you I will be in big trouble". Despite opining that the two teams and the match officials would act fairly, he criticised players who dive, despite not naming any names. Mourinho also claimed that in after leaving Chelsea for the first time in September 2007, he was approached to manage Tottenham by chairman Daniel Levy, and again in 2012.

=== Team selection ===
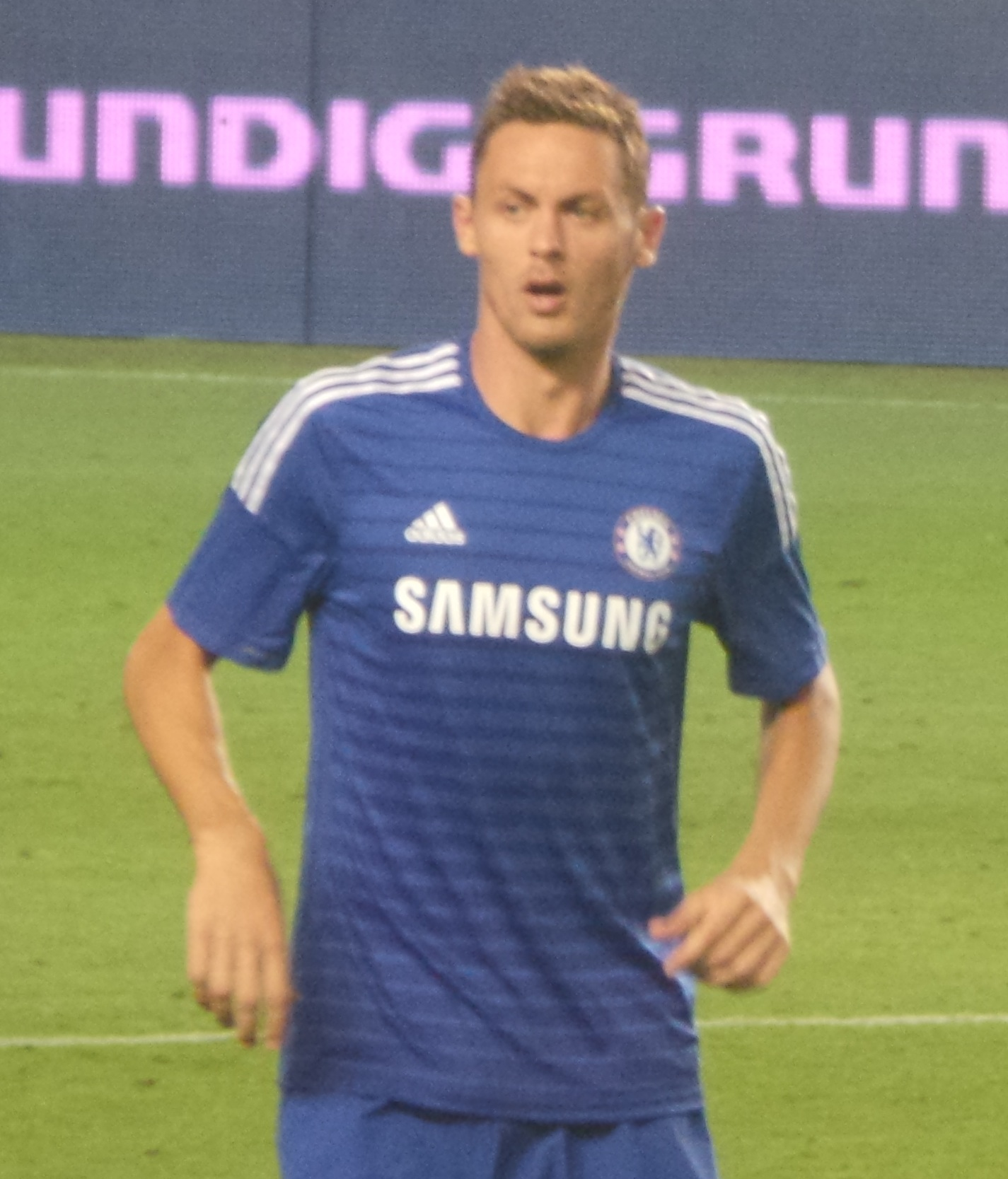
Chelsea midfielder Nemanja Matić was suspended for the final

Chelsea midfielder Nemanja Matić was suspended for the final, due to a two-match ban he received for pushing over Burnley's Ashley Barnes in a league match on 21 February 2015. Another central midfielder for the club, John Obi Mikel, missed the match through a knee injury. Due to Matić's absence, Kurt Zouma – usually a central defender – moved into defensive midfield, with Gary Cahill introduced into Zouma's previous position. Chelsea made four other changes from their draw with Burnley: Petr Čech started in goal in place of Thibaut Courtois, César Azpilicueta at left-back instead of Filipe Luís, and Ramires and Willian came into the midfield at the expense of Juan Cuadrado and Oscar. Chelsea set up with a three-man attack, with Eden Hazard and Willian wide of Diego Costa.

Tottenham's second-choice goalkeeper Michel Vorm had played all of their fixtures on their way to the final, but was dropped to the bench and replaced with Hugo Lloris for the decisive game. Compared to their defeat at Fiorentina, Tottenham made three changes in defence, with only Jan Vertonghen retaining his place – Vlad Chiricheș, Federico Fazio and Ben Davies were replaced by Kyle Walker, Eric Dier and Danny Rose, with Chiricheș not even featuring on the substitutes' bench. Defensive midfielder Benjamin Stambouli and attacking midfielder Erik Lamela were replaced by Ryan Mason and Andros Townsend respectively, with the lone striker position changing from Roberto Soldado to Harry Kane.

=== Summary ===
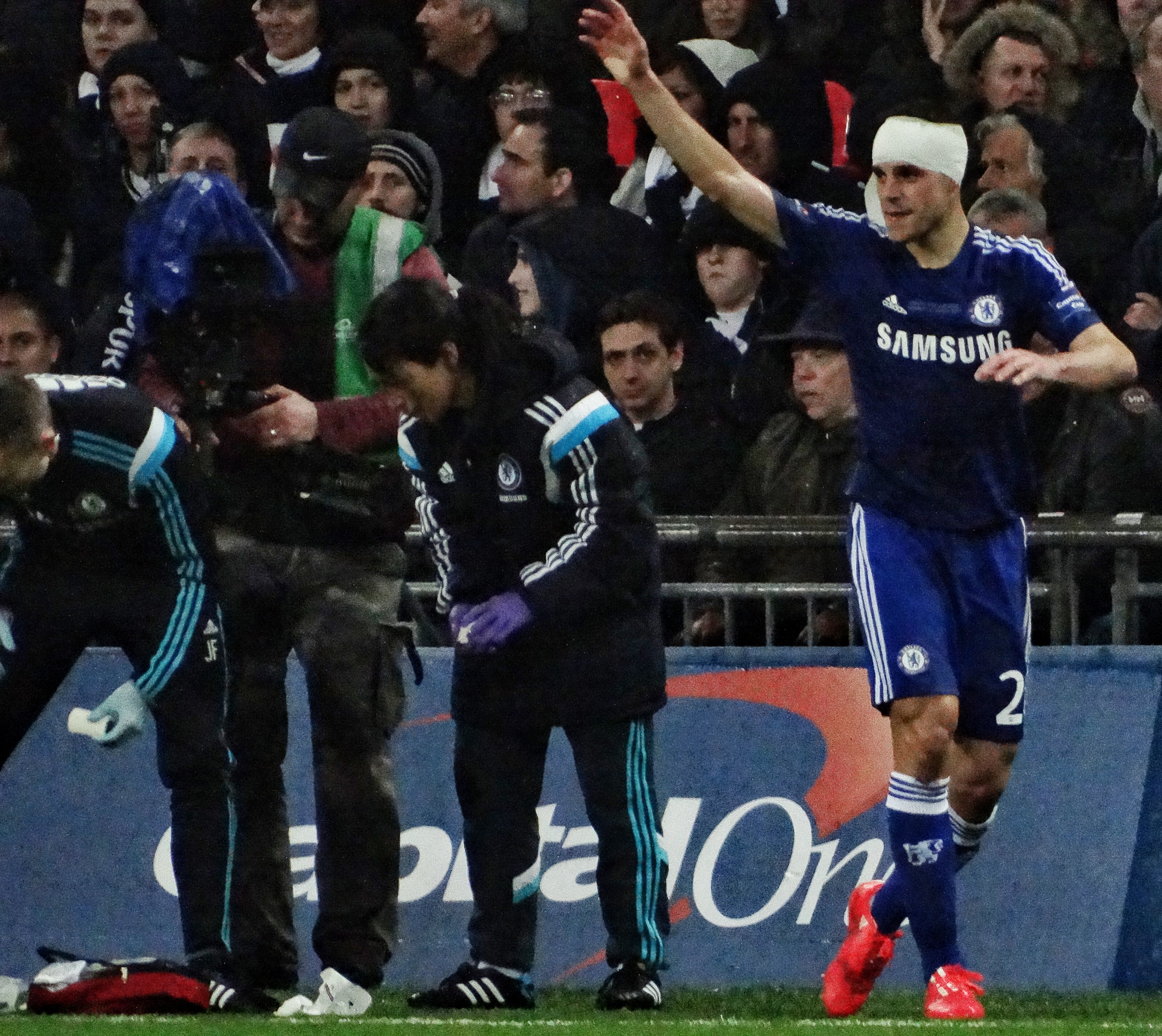
César Azpilicueta returning to the pitch after treatment for a head injury

In the 10th minute, Christian Eriksen had the first meaningful shot, hitting the crossbar with a 25-yard free kick for Tottenham. Twenty minutes later, Eric Dier was given the game's first yellow card for a foul on Diego Costa. At the end of the first half, Chelsea won a free kick on their right side when Branislav Ivanović was pulled down by Nacer Chadli. Willian took the free kick, which arrived at Kurt Zouma, played it down to captain John Terry. Terry's shot – Chelsea's first on target – went past Hugo Lloris due to a deflection by Dier. In added time at the end of the first half, Gary Cahill had a header from a corner, which was caught by Lloris.

Neither side made a substitution at half time. In the 56th minute, Cesc Fàbregas – who had a bicycle kick saved by Lloris – set up Diego Costa, whose shot from the left of the area deflected off Tottenham right-back Kyle Walker and into the net to double Chelsea's advantage. After conceding their second goal, Tottenham made a series of attacking substitutions – Andros Townsend, Ryan Mason and Chadli made way for Mousa Dembélé, Erik Lamela and Roberto Soldado respectively – but could not change the score. In the 74th minute, Dier's knee caught César Azpilicueta, drawing blood; the Chelsea left-back left the pitch to be bandaged and returned two minutes later. There were four minutes of added time, in which Chelsea substituted Costa for Didier Drogba.

=== Details ===
1 March 2015
16:00 GMT

| Chelsea | 2–0 | Tottenham Hotspur |
|---|---|---|
| Terry 45'; Costa 56' | Report |

Wembley Stadium, London
Attendance: 89,294
Referee: Anthony Taylor (Cheshire)

| Chelsea | Tottenham Hotspur |

| GK | 1 | (Czech Republic) Petr Čech |
| RB | 2 | (Serbia) Branislav Ivanović |
| CB | 24 | (England) Gary Cahill |
| CB | 26 | (England) John Terry (c) |
| LB | 28 | (Spain) César Azpilicueta |
| DM | 5 | (France) Kurt Zouma | (yellow card) 72' |
| CM | 7 | (Brazil) Ramires |
| CM | 4 | (Spain) Cesc Fàbregas | | (substituted off) 88' |
| RW | 22 | (Brazil) Willian | (yellow card) 70' | (substituted off) 76' |
| LW | 10 | (Belgium) Eden Hazard |
| CF | 19 | (Spain) Diego Costa | | (substituted off) 90+3' |
Substitutes:
| GK | 13 | (Belgium) Thibaut Courtois |
| DF | 3 | (Brazil) Filipe Luís |
| DF | 6 | (Netherlands) Nathan Aké |
| MF | 8 | (Brazil) Oscar | | (substituted on) 88' |
| MF | 23 | (Colombia) Juan Cuadrado | (yellow card) 85' | (substituted on) 76' |
| FW | 11 | (Ivory Coast) Didier Drogba | | (substituted on) 90+3' |
| FW | 18 | (France) Loïc Rémy |
Manager:
(Portugal) José Mourinho

| GK | 1 | (France) Hugo Lloris (c) |
| RB | 2 | (England) Kyle Walker |
| CB | 15 | (England) Eric Dier | (yellow card) 31' |
| CB | 5 | (Belgium) Jan Vertonghen |
| LB | 3 | (England) Danny Rose |
| CM | 42 | (Algeria) Nabil Bentaleb | (yellow card) 78' |
| CM | 38 | (England) Ryan Mason | | (substituted off) 71' |
| RW | 17 | (England) Andros Townsend | | (substituted off) 62' |
| AM | 23 | (Denmark) Christian Eriksen |
| LW | 22 | (Belgium) Nacer Chadli | | (substituted off) 80' |
| CF | 18 | (England) Harry Kane |
Substitutes:
| GK | 13 | (Netherlands) Michel Vorm |
| DF | 21 | (Argentina) Federico Fazio |
| DF | 33 | (Wales) Ben Davies |
| MF | 11 | (Argentina) Erik Lamela | | (substituted on) 71' |
| MF | 19 | (Belgium) Mousa Dembélé | | (substituted on) 62' |
| MF | 25 | (France) Benjamin Stambouli |
| FW | 9 | (Spain) Roberto Soldado | | (substituted on) 80' |
Manager:
(Argentina) Mauricio Pochettino

Man of the match

- (England) John Terry (Chelsea)

Match officials

- Assistant referees:
  - Lee Betts (Norfolk)
  - Dave Bryan (Lincolnshire)
- Fourth official: Craig Pawson (South Yorkshire)
- Reserve assistant referee: Andy Halliday (North Yorkshire)

Match rules

- 90 minutes.
- 30 minutes of extra time if necessary.
- Penalty shoot-out if scores still level.
- Seven named substitutes, of which three may be used.

== Post-match ==
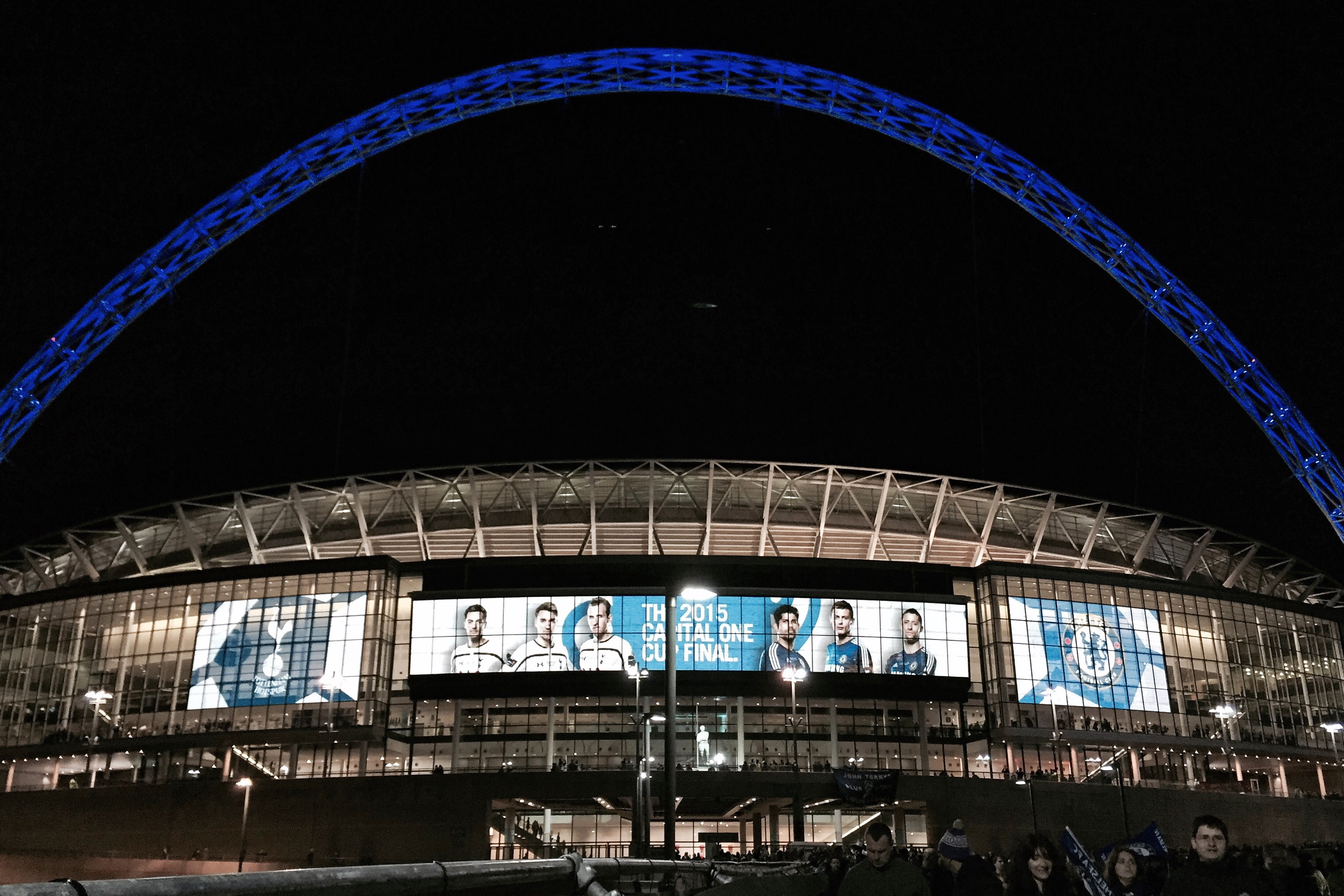
The arch of Wembley Stadium was illuminated in blue after Chelsea's victory.

Mourinho was pleased to have won the final, earning the 21st trophy of his managerial career: "I am like a kid winning the first one, it's hard for me to live without titles. I need to feed myself with them." Terry was optimistic about the club's prospects for the future, saying, "It is the start of something... we've got a great squad, with some great young players, and hungry and experienced players too. It's a great mix." Although praising the atmosphere at Wembley, Terry ruled out returning to the England team, for whom he had not played since 2012. Despite losing, Pochettino expressed pride in his team's performance.

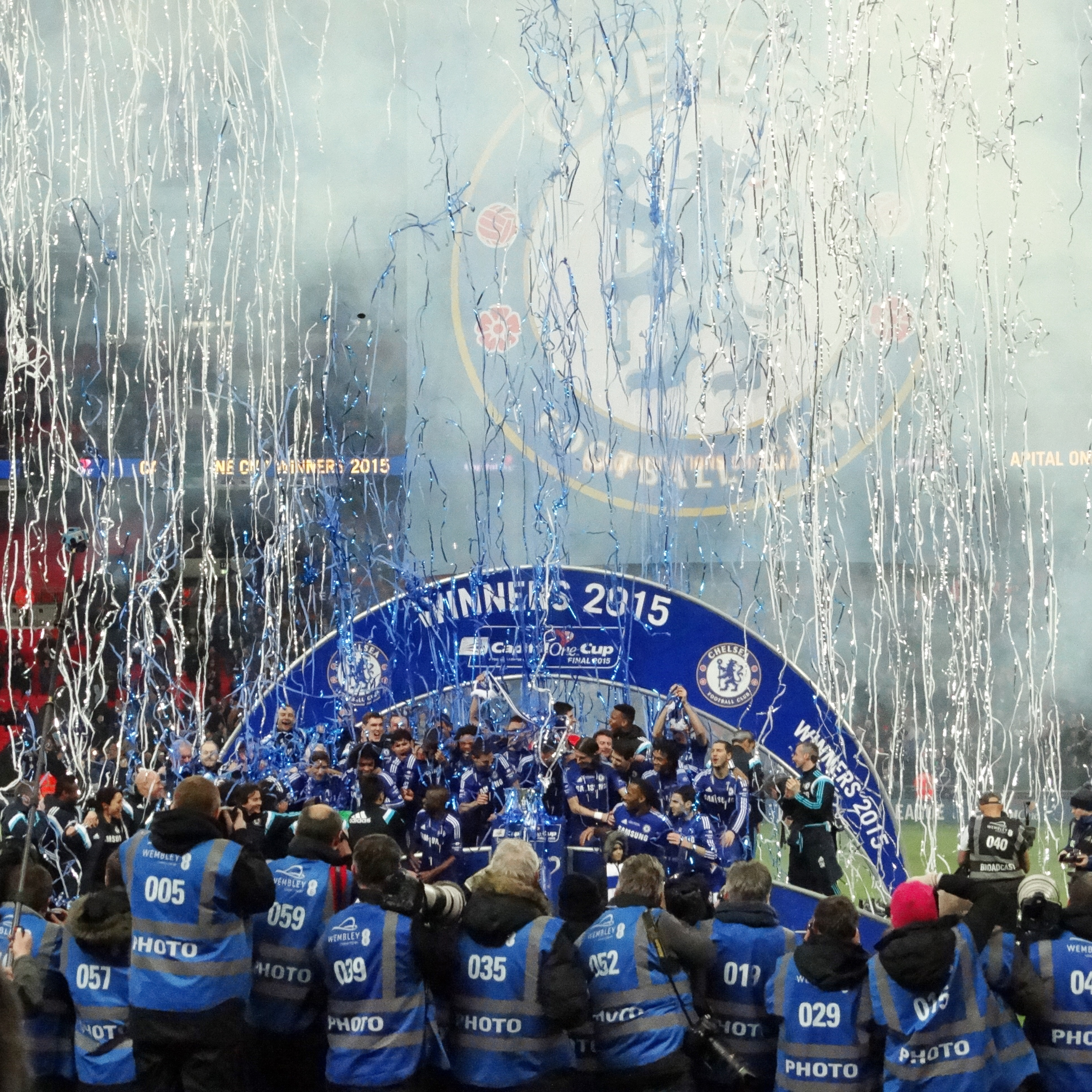
Chelsea celebrating their victory

Matić took part in Chelsea's trophy ceremony in full kit despite being suspended, similar to how Terry had done after Chelsea won the 2012 UEFA Champions League Final with him suspended. Mourinho did not concur with the official man of the match award going to Terry, stating that the honour should have gone to Thibaut Courtois and Filipe Luís for their performances against Liverpool, and Andreas Christensen for his performance against Shrewsbury Town.

Chelsea qualified for the next season's UEFA Europa League by winning the match. As they qualified for the UEFA Champions League by winning the Premier League, the Europa League place went to Liverpool, who finished sixth in the Premier League.
