= Hernán Godoy =

Chilean footballer and manager (1941–2025)

Personal information
- Full name: Hernán Humberto Godoy Véliz
- Date of birth: 14 May 1941
- Place of birth: San Félix, Alto del Carmen, Chile
- Date of death: 19 March 2025 (aged 83)
- Height: 1.70 m (5 ft 7 in)
- Position: Striker

Youth career
- Deportes La Serena

Senior career*
Years	Team	Apps	(Gls)
1958–1965	Deportes La Serena		
1966	Santiago Wanderers		
1967	Palestino		
1968–1971	Comunicaciones		
1970	→ Motagua (loan)		(10)
1972	Audax Italiano		
1973	Alianza		
1973	Magallanes		
1973	Trasandino		
1974	Unión Magdalena		
1974	Audax Italiano		

Managerial career
- 1974: Audax Italiano (assistant)
- 1974–1977: Audax Italiano
- 1977: Naval
- 1978: Trasandino
- 1979: Ñublense
- 1980–1981: Audax Italiano
- 1982: San Luis
- 1982: Deportes Concepción
- 1983: Fernández Vial
- 1983: Regional Atacama
- 1984: Deportes Puerto Montt
- 1984: Trasandino
- 1985: Audax Italiano
- 1986: Deportes Arica
- 1986–1987: Deportes Antofagasta
- 1988: Santiago Wanderers
- 1989: Deportes Linares
- 1989: Audax Italiano
- 1990: Inca de New York
- 1990: Deportes Arica
- 1991: Inca de New York
- 1991: Santiago Wanderers
- 1992: Comunicaciones
- 1993–1994: Deportes Arica
- 1995: Deportes Melipilla
- 1996–1997: Unión Santa Cruz
- 1998: Florida Soccer Miami
- 1998: San Antonio Unido
- 1999: Unión San Felipe
- 2000: Deportes Arica
- 2001–2002: Audax Italiano
- 2002: Deportes Iquique
- 2002–2003: Santiago Morning
- 2004: Mitra Kukar
- 2004–2005: Unión San Felipe
- 2006–2007: Santiago Wanderers
- 2008: Unión Quilpué
- 2009: San Antonio Unido (sport manager)
- 2009–2010: Deportes Arica
- 2011: Deportes Melipilla
- 2011: Santiago Morning
- 2012: Independiente Cauquenes (adviser)
- 2013–2014: Santiago Morning
- 2016–2017: Santiago Morning
- 2018: Deportes Arica
- * Club domestic league appearances and goals

Hernán Humberto Godoy Véliz (14 May 1941 – 19 March 2025), better known by his nickname Clavito Godoy, was a Chilean footballer and later football manager.

== Career ==
A product of Deportes La Serena youth system, he made his debut at the age of 16. The matches against the traditional opponent, Coquimbo Unido, are well remembered, especially duels versus Arturo Canilla Díaz and Alfonso Pocho Morales. In Chile he also played for Santiago Wanderers, Palestino, Audax Italiano, Magallanes and Trasandino. Abroad he played for Comunicaciones in Guatemala, Motagua in Honduras, Alianza in El Salvador and Unión Magdalena in Colombia.

He made coaching courses in both Italy and France, becoming a prolific football manager who was Chilean who coached more teams in his career with 25 different clubs in five countries: Chile, the United States, Guatemala, Vietnam and Indonesia. In addition he worked as an assistant coach in Audax Italiano (1974), General Manager in San Antonio Unido (2009) and sports advisor in Independiente de Cauquenes (2012). On 1 August 2018, he joined San Marcos de Arica. As a football manager, he was well known by using a whiteboard to make the tactics.

== Personal life and death ==
Godoy was well known by his nickname Clavito (Little Nail). He published two books: "La pizarra de Clavito" (The Little Nail's whiteboard) and "Un Clavo saca otro clavo" (A Nail removes another nail).

He and his wife, Juana Paredes, had four children, three daughters and a son. Godoy died from liver cancer on 19 March 2025, at the age of 83.

His grandsons, Emanuel López and Alejandro Muñoz, are professional footballers who made their professional debuts playing for Santiago Morning in 2017, when Godoy was the manager.

== Honors ==
Comunicaciones F.C.

- Liga Nacional de Fútbol de Guatemala: 1968–69

Individual

- Liga Nacional de Fútbol de Guatemala top scorer: 1968–69

== See also ==
- List of football managers with the most matches
