= Torino (footballer) =

Brazilian footballer (1948–2013)

Personal information
- Full name: Vitorino Lopes Garcia
- Date of birth: 1 November 1948
- Place of birth: Pelotas, Rio Grande do Sul, Brazil
- Date of death: 19 March 2013 (aged 64)
- Place of death: Florianópolis, Brazil
- Position: Attacking midfielder

Youth career
- EC Hilaturas (futsal)
- Tejidos (futsal)
- Brasil de Pelotas (futsal)

Senior career*
Years	Team	Apps	(Gls)
1966–1967	Brasil de Pelotas		
1968–1970	Botafogo	14	(2)
1970	Olaria		
1971–1972	Grêmio	19	(3)
1972	Sergipe	13	(2)
1973	Athletico Paranaense	15	(2)
1974	Grêmio	20	(3)
1974	Inter de Lages		
1975	CSA	12	(0)
1975	Rio Negro		
1975	Galícia		
1976	Colorado		
1976	Brasil de Pelotas		
1976	Juventude		
1977	Chapecoense		
1978–1979	Coquimbo Unido	55	(11)
1980–1985	Deportes La Serena	69	(18)
1985	Chapecoense		

Managerial career
- Figueirense (youth)
- Guarani de Palhoça (assistant)
- Canoinhas AC
- * Club domestic league appearances and goals

Vitorino Lopes Garcia (11 November 1948 – 19 March 2013), known as Torino, was a Brazilian footballer who played as an attacking midfielder for clubs in Brazil and Chile.

== Playing career ==
Born in Pelotas, Brazil, as a youth player, Torino played futsal for the clubs EC Hilaturas, Tejidos and Brasil de Pelotas in his city of birth. He began his career in football with Brasil de Pelotas in 1966. With an extensive career in his country of birth, he stood out as a player of important clubs such as Botafogo, Grêmio, Athletico Paranaense, Juventude, Chapecoense, among others.

He also had stints with Olaria, Sergipe, Inter de Lages, CSA, Rio Negro, Galícia and Colorado.

On 17 June 1972, he took part of the Gaúcho team alongside players such as Elías Figueroa, Everaldo and Atilio Ancheta, in a match against the Brazil national team in Estádio Beira-Rio, which is well-remembered by the most attendance in the stadium history.

As a player of Botafogo, he won the 1968 Campeonato Brasileiro (Taça Brasil).

In 1978, he emigrated to Chile and signed with Coquimbo Unido in the top division by recommendation of Elías Figueroa, alongside his compatriot Benê. A year later, Liminha joined the club recommended by Torino. They three are well remembered by his seasons together in the squad.

In 1980, he switched to the traditional rival, Deportes La Serena, staying with them until 1985, returning to his homeland the same year to play for Chapecoense for six months.

== Coaching career ==
Torino started a football academy in Florianópolis. Since his death, it has been managed by his son.

At club level, he worked for the Figueirense youth system in the 1990s, coached teams from the South of Brazil, such as Canoinhas AC and was the assistant coach of Guarani de Palhoça.

== Personal life ==
Torino had four children, three daughters and a son, Torino Garcia Lopes, who was born in Coquimbo, Chile.

He developed a close friendship with his former fellows footballers in Botafogo, Afonsinho and Caju, who frequently visited him at home located in Praia dos Ingleses.

He performed as a sport commentator for Rádio Ilha Norte FM.

He died due to cancer.

== Honours ==
Botafogo

- Taça Brasil: 1968
