= Zé Roberto =

Brazilian footballer (born 1974)

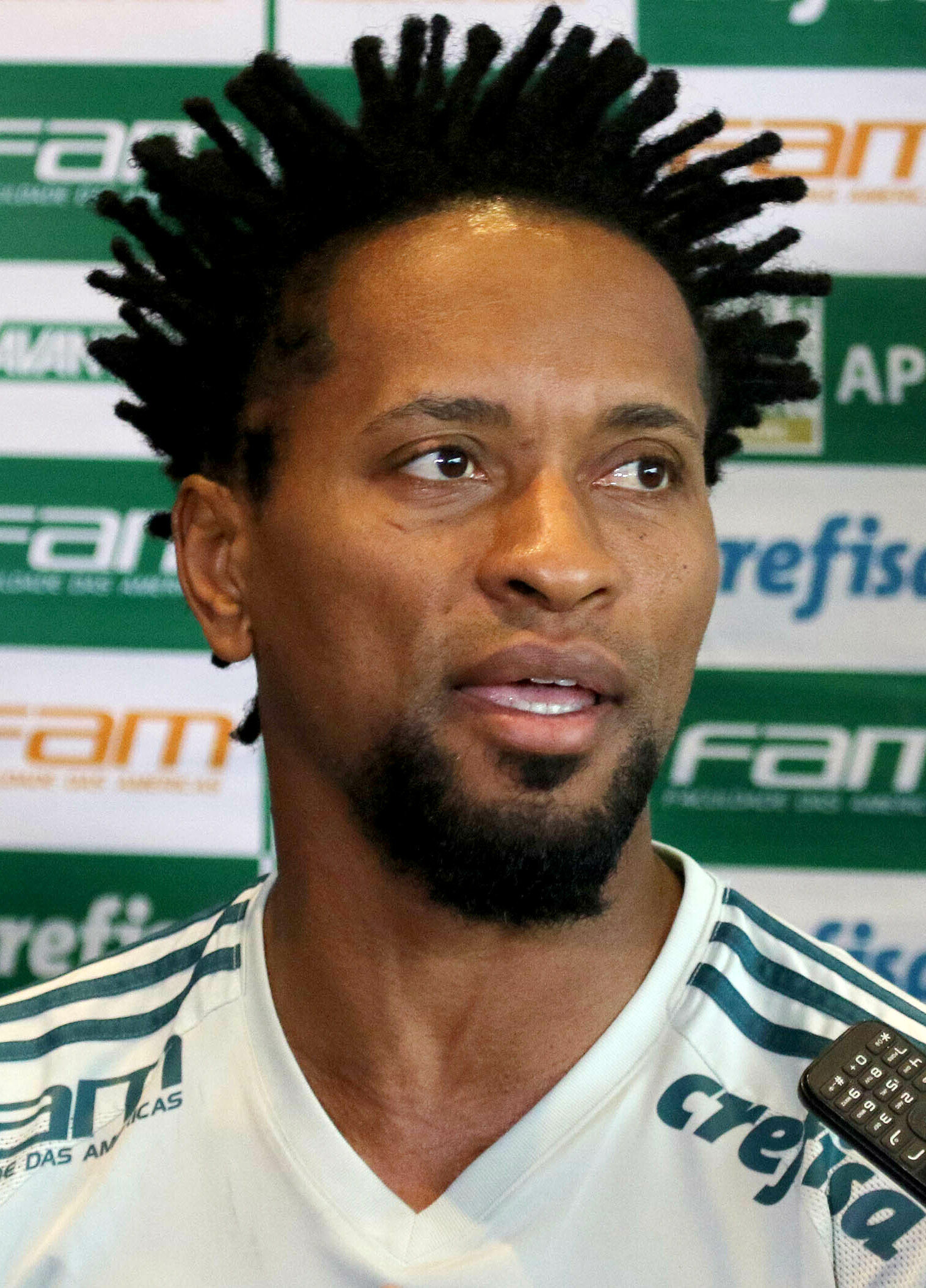
- Zé Roberto with Palmeiras in 2017

Personal information
- Full name: José Roberto da Silva Júnior
- Date of birth: 6 July 1974 (age 52)
- Place of birth: São Paulo, Brazil
- Height: 1.76 m (5 ft 9 in)
- Positions: Left wing-back; midfielder

Youth career
- Palestra de São Bernardo

Senior career*
| Years | Team | Apps | (Gls) |
| 1994–1996 | Portuguesa | 61 | (1) |
| 1997 | Real Madrid | 15 | (0) |
| 1998 | Flamengo | 24 | (0) |
| 1998–2002 | Bayer Leverkusen | 113 | (17) |
| 2002–2006 | Bayern Munich | 110 | (5) |
| 2006–2009 | Nacional | 0 | (0) |
| 2006–2007 | → Santos (loan) | 13 | (2) |
| 2007–2009 | → Bayern Munich (loan) | 59 | (9) |
| 2009–2011 | Hamburger SV | 54 | (7) |
| 2011–2012 | Al-Gharafa | 14 | (1) |
| 2012–2014 | Grêmio | 82 | (6) |
| 2015–2017 | Palmeiras | 68 | (3) |
| Total | | 648 | (51) |

International career
| 1995–2006 | Brazil | 84 | (6) |
Medal record
Men's football
Representing Brazil
Copa América
| Winner | 1997 Bolivia |
| Winner | 1999 Paraguay |
FIFA Confederations Cup
| Winner | 1997 Saudi Arabia |
| Winner | 2005 Germany |
| Runner-up | 1999 Mexico |
FIFA World Cup
| Runner-up | 1998 France |
- * Club domestic league appearances and goals

José Roberto da Silva Júnior (born 6 July 1974), commonly known as Zé Roberto, is a Brazilian former professional footballer who played as a left wing-back or as a midfielder. He is most well known for his time with Bayer Leverkusen and Bayern Munich in the Bundesliga, as well as Portuguesa, Grêmio and Palmeiras in the Brazilian league. In addition, he is one of the few players to have made over 1,050 career appearances.

He made his debut for Portuguesa where he played for two seasons before joining Real Madrid in January 1997. He left Real Madrid later that year to get more playing time and increase his chances of selection for the 1998 FIFA World Cup. He joined Flamengo before returning to Europe in the summer of 1998, signing for Bayer Leverkusen.

At Bayer Leverkusen, Zé Roberto challenged Bayern Munich for the Bundesliga title, as Leverkusen finished runner-ups on three occasions. Leverkusen also made it to the 2002 UEFA Champions League final which they lost to Real Madrid. In 2002, Zé Roberto joined Bayern Munich where he won four Bundesliga titles over six seasons. He also played for Santos, Hamburger SV, Al-Gharafa, Grêmio and Palmeiras. Over the course of his career, he played 961 club games and took the field 84 times for Brazil.

Currently, he is a technical advisor to Palmeiras, acting directly with the players and the coaching staff.

== Club career ==
=== Early career ===
Zé Roberto started in the youth ranks of Palestra de São Bernardo but it was while playing for Portuguesa, as a left-back, that he became known throughout Brazil after finishing as runner-up in 1996 Campeonato Brasileiro Série A.

He then joined Real Madrid in January 1997 for a brief spell, where he helped them win the 1996–97 La Liga. He was also part of the Madrid's 1997–98 UEFA Champions League winning squad, scoring his only goal for the club in the opening group match against Rosenborg BK, before moving back to Brazil to play for Flamengo midway through the season. In an interview in 2012, Zé Roberto spoke of his decision to leave Madrid because of his ambition to play for Brazil at the 1998 FIFA World Cup in France and had limited opportunities to prove his talents in Spain. In later interviews, he also stated that distractions during his early time in Madrid, such as late-night video gaming and poor sleeping habits, affected his performance and adaptation to European football.

During the first half of 1998, Zé Roberto played for Flamengo under manager Paulo Autuori alongside Romário, Palinha, Juan, and his former Portuguesa teammate Rodrigo Fabri for the Rio de Janeiro State Championship, finishing disappointingly as runners-up. After this he was signed by German Bundesliga club Bayer 04 Leverkusen.

=== Bayer Leverkusen ===
He joined Bayer Leverkusen in the summer of 1998. It was at Leverkusen that he really made a name for himself, quickly becoming a popular figure at the club. During his four-year stay, Bayer enjoyed their most successful period at the time, finishing as runners-up in the German Bundesliga on three occasions.

On 4 December 2001, he opened the scoring with a curling free kick against Deportivo de La Coruña in the 64th minute, as Bayer comprehensively beat the Spanish side 3–0 in the second group stage of the Champions League. Following Bayer's victory over Liverpool in the quarter-finals of the Champions League on 9 April 2002, Zé Roberto announced that he would be joining former teammate Michael Ballack at Bayern Munich. Despite the transfer distractions, Zé Roberto helped Bayer reach the final of the Champions League on 15 May 2002, losing 2–1 to former club Real Madrid in Glasgow. In four years at the club, Zé Roberto appeared in 113 league matches scoring 16 goals.

=== Bayern Munich and Santos ===
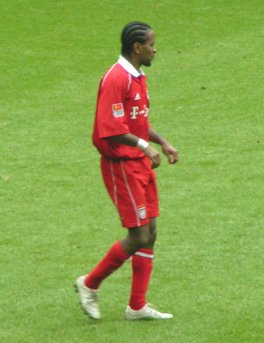
Zé Roberto with Bayern Munich in 2006

In May 2002, Zé Roberto joined Bayern Munich for a reported fee of €12 million, signing a three-year deal, linking up with emerging German talent Sebastian Deisler and former Leverkusen teammate Michael Ballack. With Bayern, he claimed the domestic league and cup double three times between 2002 and 2006. He found his starting spot threatened under new coach Felix Magath and left the club in 2006. Following the announcement that he would not return to Bayern Munich, he publicly criticized the club's style of play and predicted struggles if changes were not made.

Being a free agent, Zé Roberto signed through his agent Juan Figer a three-year contract with Club Nacional de Football in Montevideo, a club he would never play for. In August 2006, it was announced that Zé Roberto would join Santos FC in Brazil for one year. He helped the team win the 2007 Campeonato Paulista, his first title in a Brazilian competition. He scored seven goals in the 2007 Copa Libertadores, where Santos reached the semi-finals. During his time with Santos, Zé Roberto appeared in 48 official matches and scored 12 goals, playing for the first time in his career as an attacking midfielder.

In June 2007, it was announced that Zé Roberto would return to Bayern Munich, which paid one million euro to Nacional for a two-year loan. He stated, "It was as if I’d never been away", en route to winning a fourth domestic double with the Bavarians. The revitalised Zé Roberto demonstrated all his newly acquired skills by scoring five goals and forming a rock-solid partnership with Mark van Bommel in his new role in central defensive midfield.

Zé Roberto made a successful start to the 2008–09 season, scoring four goals in his first 11 starts. He would conclude his second spell at the club appearing in 59 league matches and scoring nine goals.

Zé Roberto left the club at the end of the 2009 season after Bayern executives refused to offer him a new two-year deal.

=== Hamburger SV ===
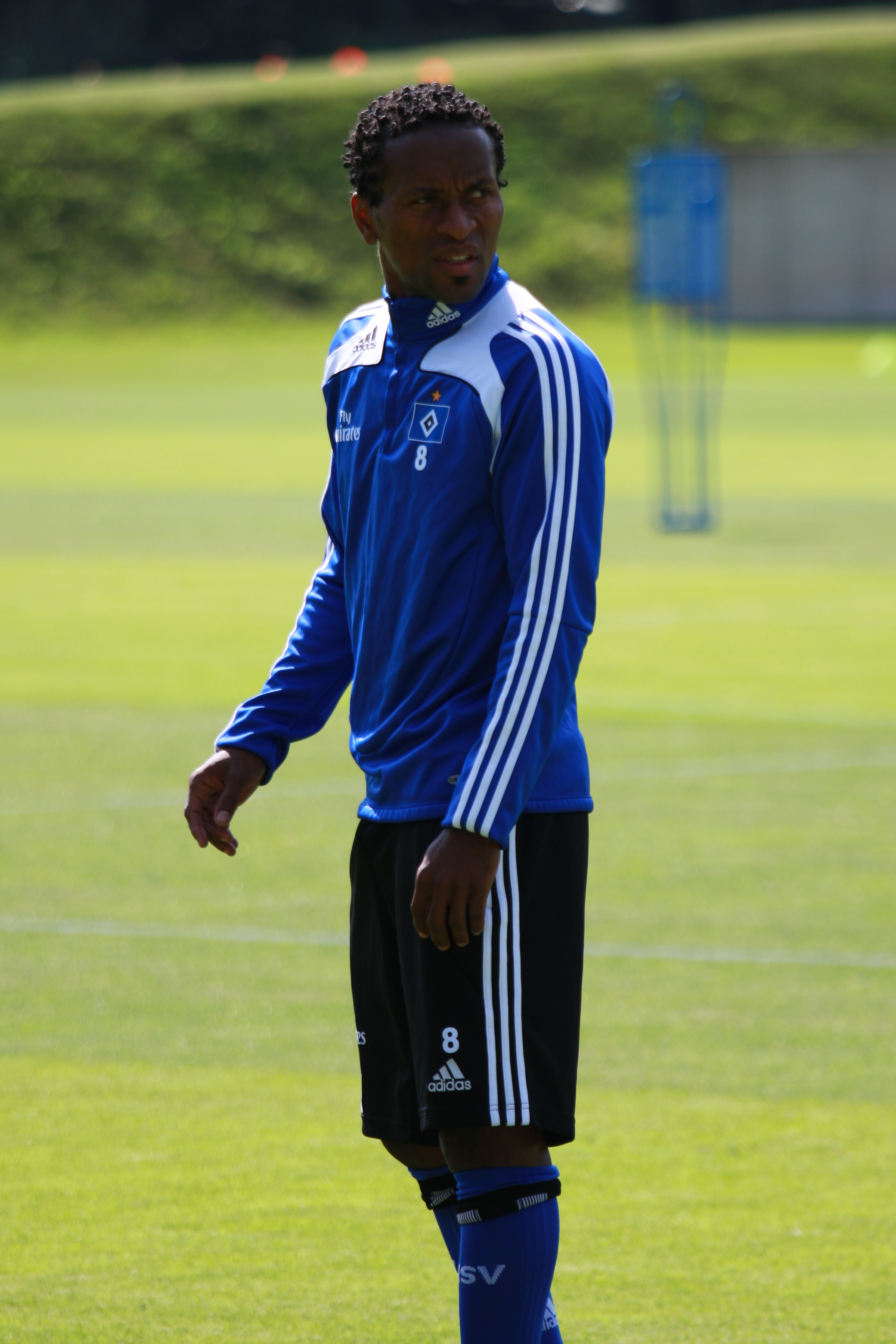
Zé Roberto training with Hamburg in 2009

Zé Roberto's contract with Bayern ran until 30 June 2009. The club offered him a contract until 2010, though he declined. Bundesliga side Hamburger SV officially announced his signing to a two-year contract on 2 July 2009. Der Spiegel reported that Hamburg actually paid €4 million sign-on fees to Zé Roberto's agent Juan Figer, which Bayern also paid €1 million in 2007.

In May 2011, Zé Roberto confirmed that he would not renew his contract with the German team as he wanted a longer contract than the new one offered by the club.

=== Al-Gharafa ===
On 10 July 2011, Zé Roberto signed a two-year contract with the Qatari club Al-Gharafa.

=== Return to Brazil ===
After a season with Qatari outfit Al-Gharafa, Zé Roberto returned to Brazil in May to join Grêmio FBPA in Puerto Alegre, helping them finish third in the Campeonato Brasileiro Série A. On 10 December 2012, he expressed his desire to retire at Grêmio after extending his contract by a further year.

On 9 December 2014, Zé Roberto left Grêmio as the club decided not to renew his contract.

=== Palmeiras ===
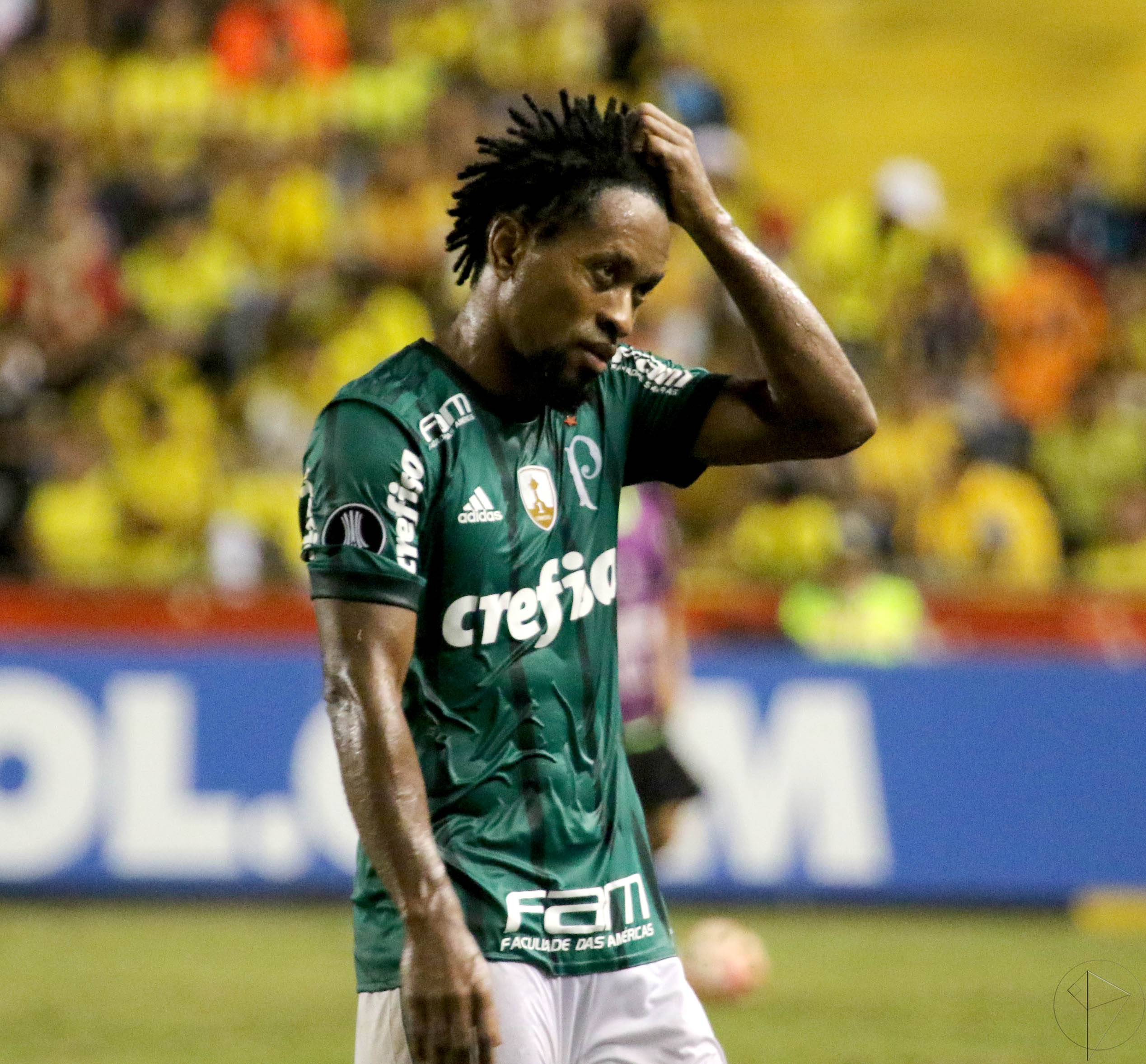
Zé Roberto playing for Palmeiras in 2017

On 22 December 2014, Zé Roberto joined Palmeiras on a one-year contract, valid until 31 December 2015. He was immediately appointed team captain, helping them win the 2015 Copa do Brasil with four goals scored in the competition and a successful penalty in the final. In the Campeonato Brasileiro Série A, Palmeiras finished in the 9th position. He signed a one-year extension to his contract on 19 October 2015, valid until 31 December 2016. On 28 November 2016, he won his first national championship in Brazil. He declared after the final match against Chapecoense that he would not retire at the end of the season. Eventually, on 9 December, he signed a new contract with Palmeiras, keeping him at the club until the end of 2017.

On 24 May 2017, Zé Roberto started in the last match of the 2017 Copa Libertadores group stage because Palmeira's place in the knock-out rounds was already secured; he scored in the 90th minute to seal a 3–1 win over Atlético Tucumán, becoming, at the age of 42 years and 10 months, the oldest-ever goalscorer in the history of the Copa Libertadores, breaking the previous record set by Óscar Aguirregaray in 2001, at the age of 41 years and 7 months. This goal also saw him become the second-oldest goalscorer in international club tournaments in South America, only behind Richard Pellejero who scored a brace in the 2019 Copa Sudamericana, aged 43 years and 31 days. Later that year, on 24 November, he announced that the Palmeiras match against Botafogo two days later would be the last of his career and that he would retire.

== International career ==
Zé Roberto was part of the Brazil squads at the 1998 and 2006 World Cups. In 1998, he helped the Seleção to the final, making one appearance, but was an unused substitute as Brazil lost to hosts France 3–0. He was left out of the 2002 World Cup winning squad due to a calf injury. In the 2006 World Cup finals in Germany Zé Roberto scored Brazil's third and final goal in a man of the match performance in Brazil's second round match against Ghana. He was the only Brazil player to feature in the all star team of the tournament.

Zé Roberto helped Brazil to wins at the 1997 and 1999 editions of the Copa América, scoring Brazil's third goal in their 3–1 defeat of Bolivia in the final on 26 June 1997.

He also represented Brazil at the 1997 and 2005 FIFA Confederations Cups in Saudi Arabia and Germany respectively, winning both. He played the full ninety minutes of the final in 2005, as Brazil overpowered arch rivals Argentina 4–1 on 29 June 2005. He also came runner-up with Brazil at the 1999 edition.

== Style of play ==
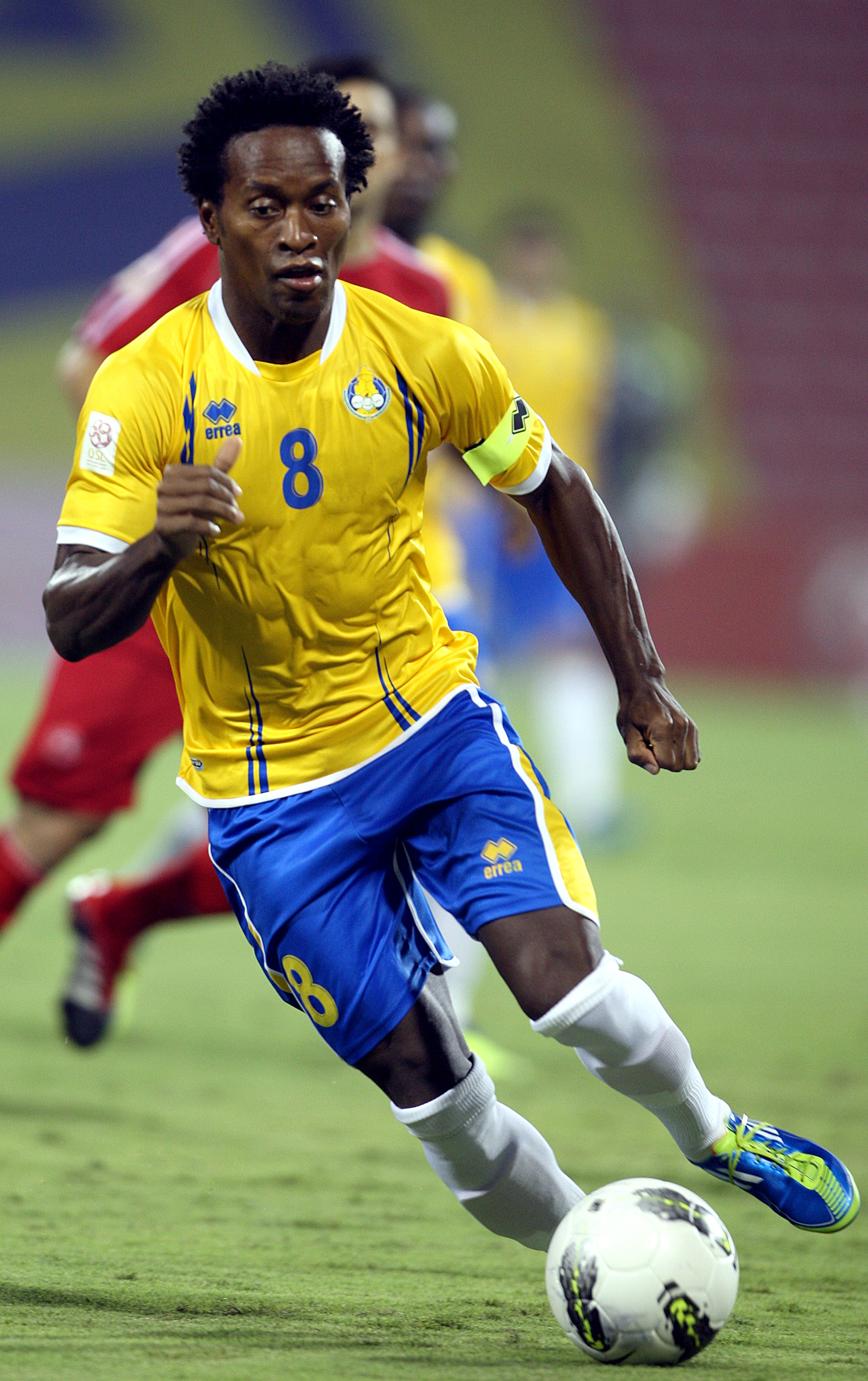
Zé Roberto in 2011

Capable of playing both as a left-sided defender and in several midfield positions, Zé Roberto was a quick, hard-working and versatile left-footed player who in his prime was known for his technique, vision and efficient style of play as well as his dribbling, passing, crossing and tackling ability. He started his career as an attacking full-back or wing-back on the left flank, occasionally functioning in a box-to-box role in midfield; he was later deployed as a left-winger and subsequently in a more creative role as an attacking midfielder, although he struggled to find space in the national side in this position due to the presence of several other world-class playmakers in the squad. During his time at Bayern Munich, Zé Roberto excelled alongside van Bommel as a defensive midfielder due to his ability to read the game, break down opposing plays and subsequently start counter-attacks; his adeptness at this new holding role led him to be called up to the Brazil national team once again, where he also formed an effective and consistent defensive midfield partnership with Emerson.

== Career after retiring as a player ==
In 2022, Betsson, the leading international sportsbook and casino operator, announced Zé Roberto as a global ambassador on a three-year deal across all brands in its portfolio describing him as the best strategic partner to represent its brand in Brazil.

As of July 2024, Roberto had over 2.8 million followers on Instagram and has become a major fitness influencer in Brazil.

== Personal life and views ==
Zé Roberto is married to Luciana, with whom he has three children.

He is a Christian, stating, "Aside from the fame, the money, from not being able to have anything and today being able to have everything, I find that the difference is to have God in my heart, by accepting Jesus. The money will finish, fame will be forgotten, but God is special. Today I have God and tomorrow I will live with God in a much better place, that is, Heaven."

He defended Brazil manager Tite's decision to call up Dani Alves to play in the 2022 FIFA World Cup.

== Career statistics ==
=== Club ===
Appearances and goals by club, season and competition
| Club | Season | League | | | National cup (Note: Includes DFB-Pokal, Copa do Brasil) | | Continental | | Other | | Total | |
| Club | Season | Division | Apps | Goals | Apps | Goals | Apps | Goals | Apps | Goals | Apps | Goals |
|---|---|---|---|---|---|---|---|---|---|---|---|---|
| Portuguesa | 1994 | Série A | | | | | | | | | | |
| Portuguesa | 1995 | Série A | | | | | | | | | | |
| Portuguesa | 1996 | Série A | | | | | | | | | | |
| Portuguesa | Total | | | | | | | | | | 61 | 1 |
| Real Madrid | 1996–97 | La Liga | 9 | 0 | 0 | 0 | 0 | 0 | 0 | 0 | 9 | 0 |
| Real Madrid | 1997–98 | La Liga | 6 | 0 | 0 | 0 | 6 (Note: Appearances in UEFA Champions League) | 1 | 0 | 0 | 12 | 1 |
| Real Madrid | Total | | 15 | 0 | 0 | 0 | 6 | 1 | 0 | 0 | 21 | 1 |
| Bayer Leverkusen | 1998–99 | Bundesliga | 32 | 4 | 1 | 0 | 4 | 0 | 1 (Note: Appearance(s) in DFB-Ligapokal) | 0 | 38 | 4 |
| Bayer Leverkusen | 1999–2000 | Bundesliga | 27 | 7 | 0 | 0 | 3 (Note: One appearance in UEFA Champions League, two appearances in UEFA Cup) | 0 | 0 | 0 | 30 | 7 |
| Bayer Leverkusen | 2000–01 | Bundesliga | 24 | 2 | 1 | 0 | 7 (Note: Five appearances in UEFA Champions League, two appearances in UEFA Cup) | 0 | 0 | 0 | 32 | 2 |
| Bayer Leverkusen | 2001–02 | Bundesliga | 30 | 4 | 5 | 0 | 15 | 1 | 0 | 0 | 50 | 5 |
| Bayer Leverkusen | Total | | 113 | 17 | 7 | 0 | 29 | 1 | 1 | 0 | 150 | 18 |
| Bayern Munich | 2002–03 | Bundesliga | 31 | 1 | 4 | 1 | 7 | 0 | 0 | 0 | 42 | 2 |
| Bayern Munich | 2003–04 | Bundesliga | 30 | 2 | 2 | 0 | 7 | 0 | 1 | 0 | 40 | 2 |
| Bayern Munich | 2004–05 | Bundesliga | 22 | 1 | 4 | 0 | 8 | 1 | 2 | 1 | 36 | 3 |
| Bayern Munich | 2005–06 | Bundesliga | 27 | 1 | 4 | 0 | 8 | 0 | 0 | 0 | 39 | 1 |
| Bayern Munich | Total | | 110 | 5 | 14 | 1 | 30 | 1 | 3 | 1 | 157 | 8 |
| Santos (loan) | 2006 | Série A | 12 | 2 | 0 | 0 | 1 (Note: Appearance(s) in Copa Sudamericana) | 0 | – | | 13 | 2 |
| Santos (loan) | 2007 | Série A | 1 | 0 | 0 | 0 | 14 (Note: Appearances in Copa Libertadores) | 7 | – | | 15 | 7 |
| Santos (loan) | Total | | 13 | 2 | 0 | 0 | 15 | 7 | – | | 28 | 9 |
| Bayern Munich (loan) | 2007–08 | Bundesliga | 30 | 5 | 6 | 0 | 10 (Note: Appearances in UEFA Cup) | 0 | 3 | 0 | 49 | 5 |
| Bayern Munich (loan) | 2008–09 | Bundesliga | 29 | 4 | 4 | 1 | 9 | 2 | – | | 42 | 7 |
| Bayern Munich (loan) | Total | | 59 | 9 | 10 | 1 | 19 | 2 | 3 | 0 | 91 | 12 |
| Hamburger SV | 2009–10 | Bundesliga | 23 | 6 | 2 | 0 | 14 (Note: Appearances in UEFA Europa League) | 1 | – | | 39 | 7 |
| Hamburger SV | 2010–11 | Bundesliga | 31 | 1 | 2 | 0 | – | | – | | 33 | 1 |
| Hamburger SV | Total | | 54 | 7 | 4 | 0 | 14 | 1 | – | | 72 | 8 |
| Al-Gharafa | 2011–12 | Qatar Stars League | 14 | 1 | 0 | 0 | – | | – | | 14 | 1 |
| Grêmio | 2012 | Série A | 29 | 3 | 0 | 0 | 4 | 1 | 0 | 0 | 33 | 4 |
| Grêmio | 2013 | Série A | 22 | 3 | 1 | 0 | 9 | 3 | 9 (Note: Appearances in Campeonato Gaúcho) | 4 | 41 | 10 |
| Grêmio | 2014 | Série A | 31 | 0 | 1 | 0 | 5 | 0 | 7 | 1 | 44 | 1 |
| Grêmio | Total | | 82 | 6 | 2 | 0 | 18 | 4 | 16 | 5 | 118 | 15 |
| Palmeiras | 2015 | Série A | 26 | 2 | 9 | 4 | — | | 14 (Note: Appearances in Campeonato Paulista) | 1 | 49 | 7 |
| Palmeiras | 2016 | Série A | 27 | 1 | 4 | 1 | 5 | 0 | 9 | 0 | 45 | 2 |
| Palmeiras | 2017 | Série A | 15 | 0 | 3 | 0 | 5 | 1 | 11 | 0 | 34 | 1 |
| Palmeiras | Total | | 68 | 3 | 16 | 5 | 10 | 1 | 34 | 1 | 128 | 10 |
| Career total | | | 528 | 50 | 53 | 7 | 141 | 18 | 57 | 7 | 840 | 83 |

=== International ===
Appearances and goals by national team and year
| National team | Year | Apps | Goals |
|---|---|---|---|
| Brazil | 1995 | 4 | 0 |
| Brazil | 1996 | 4 | 0 |
| Brazil | 1997 | 11 | 1 |
| Brazil | 1998 | 2 | 0 |
| Brazil | 1999 | 15 | 3 |
| Brazil | 2000 | 10 | 0 |
| Brazil | 2001 | 1 | 0 |
| Brazil | 2002 | 1 | 0 |
| Brazil | 2003 | 8 | 0 |
| Brazil | 2004 | 7 | 0 |
| Brazil | 2005 | 14 | 1 |
| Brazil | 2006 | 7 | 1 |
| Total | | 84 | 6 |

Scores and results list Brazil's goal tally first, score column indicates score after each Zé Roberto goal.

List of international goals scored by Zé Roberto
| No. | Date | Venue | Opponent | Score | Result | Competition |
|---|---|---|---|---|---|---|
| 1 | 29 June 1997 | Estadio Hernando Siles, La Paz, Bolivia | Bolivia | 3–1 | 3–1 | 1997 Copa América |
| 2 | 24 July 1999 | Estadio Jalisco, Guadalajara, Mexico | Germany | 1–0 | 4–0 | 1999 FIFA Confederations Cup |
| 3 | 1 August 1999 | Estadio Jalisco, Guadalajara, Mexico | Saudi Arabia | 3–2 | 8–2 | 1999 FIFA Confederations Cup |
| 4 | 4 August 1999 | Estadio Azteca, Mexico City, Mexico | Mexico | 3–4 | 3–4 | 1999 FIFA Confederations Cup |
| 5 | 5 June 2005 | Estádio Beira-Rio, Porto Alegre, Brazil | Paraguay | 3–0 | 4–1 | 2006 FIFA World Cup qualification |
| 6 | 27 June 2006 | Westfalenstadion, Dortmund, Germany | Ghana | 3–0 | 3–0 | 2006 FIFA World Cup |

== Honours ==
Real Madrid

- La Liga: 1996–97
- Supercopa de España: 1997
- UEFA Champions League: 1997–98

Bayern Munich

- Bundesliga: 2002–03, 2004–05, 2005–06, 2007–08
- DFB-Pokal: 2002–03, 2004–05, 2005–06, 2007–08
- DFL-Ligapokal: 2004, 2007

Santos

- Campeonato Paulista: 2007

Palmeiras

- Série A: 2016
- Copa do Brasil: 2015

Brazil

- Copa América: 1997, 1999
- FIFA Confederations Cup: 1997, 2005; runner-up: 1999
- FIFA World Cup runner-up: 1998
- Lunar New Year Cup: 2005

Individual

- kicker Bundesliga Team of the Season: 1999–2000, 2001–02, 2007–08
- FIFA World Cup All-Star Team: 2006
- Bola de Prata: 2012, 2014
- Campeonato Paulista Team of the year: 2015
- Goal of the Year in the Brasileirão: 2016

== See also ==
- List of men's footballers with the most official appearances
