= Juan Figer =

Uruguayan-Brazilian football agent (1934–2021)

Juan Figer Svirski (4 October 1934 – 31 December 2021) was a Uruguayan-Brazilian football agent. His organisation, MJF Publicidade e Promoções S/C Ltda, represents, amongst others, Brazilian footballers Robinho, Júlio Baptista, Alex, Zé Roberto, and Europeans Luís Figo and Marcos Senna. He was co-owner of the firm with Wagner Ribeiro. Figer died from cardiac arrest, on 31 December 2021, at the age of 87.

== Business deals ==
He worked very closely with Turkish Süper Lig club Fenerbahçe club chairman Aziz Yıldırım.

Transfers he has brokered include:

- Luís Figo to Real Madrid, July 2000, €60M
- Alex to Fenerbahçe, July 2004, $5M
- Deivid, Edu Dracena, and Diego Lugano to Fenerbahçe, July 2006, $52M
- Robinho to Real Madrid, July 2005, €50M
- Júlio Baptista to Real Madrid, July 2005, €20M
- Robinho to Manchester City, July 2008, over €42.5M
- Thiago Ribeiro to Cagliari, August 2011, $5M

Clients he represented include:

- Zico
- Robinho
- Marcos Senna
- Alex
- Júlio Baptista
- Diego Lugano
- Luís Figo
- Zé Roberto
- Fábio Aurélio
- Hulk
- José Kléberson
- Alberto Acosta
- Thiago Ribeiro
- Neymar
