= Mario Rodríguez (footballer, born 1960) =

Chilean footballer

Personal information
- Full name: Mario Omar Rodríguez Ramos
- Date of birth: 8 August 1960 (age 66)
- Place of birth: Coquimbo, Chile
- Position: Goalkeeper

Youth career
- Maestranza
- Progreso Guayacán
- 1976–1977: Coquimbo Unido

Senior career*
Years	Team	Apps	(Gls)
1978–1986	Coquimbo Unido	187	(0)
1987–1989	Deportes La Serena	83	(0)
1989	Naval	25	(0)
1990–1991	Deportes La Serena	19	(0)
1991	Deportes Laja	–	(–)
1992	Halcones Negros	–	(–)
1992	Santiago Wanderers	5	(0)
1993	Coquimbo Unido	7	(0)
1994	Deportes Ovalle	28	(0)
1995	Santiago Wanderers	–	(–)

International career
1983–1984	Chile Pre-Olympic	11	(0)

Managerial career
- 2017–2018: Coquimbo Unido (gk coach)
- 2021–2023: Unión Compañías (gk coach)
- * Club domestic league appearances and goals

Mario Omar Rodríguez Ramos (born 8 August 1960), more popularly known as Loco Rodríguez (Madman Rodríguez), is a Chilean former football player who played as a goalkeeper.

== Early years ==
Born in Coquimbo, Chile, Rodríguez was with clubs Maestranza and Progreso Guayacán in his hometown before joining Coquimbo Unido in 1976. He made his senior debut in the 4–1 loss against Cobreloa in Calama on 19 December 1979. He became the regular starting goalkeeper in 1982 after Rolando Rivera injured. A player for them until 1986, he returned for the 1993 season.

Despite Rodríguez became an iconic player for Coquimbo Unido, he switched to the classic rival, Deportes La Serena, in 1987, won the Segunda División de Chile and played for them in the 1988 Primera División de Chile. He returned for the 1990 and the 1991 seasons.

In his homeland, Rodríguez also played for Naval de Talcahuano (1989), Santiago Wanderers (1992, 1995) and Deportes Ovalle (1994). He also had a brief stint with Deportes Laja in the 1991 Tercera División de Chile under Humberto Cruz and Halcones Negros from Coquimbo in 1992.

Rodríguez retired after representing Santiago Wanderers in the 1995 Copa Chile due to an articular cartilage damage.

In 1999, Rodríguez moved to Belgium, returned briefly to the activity and performed as both player and coach.

== International career ==
Rodríguez was called up to the Chile national under-20 team by Pedro García for the 1979 South American Championship. However, he rejected the call-up due to the fact that the Asociación Central de Fútbol de Chile (ACF) (Football Central Association of Chile) faked 17 of 20 players' passports.

Later, Rodríguez earned 11 caps for the Chile Pre-Olympic team in friendlies and the 1984 Pre-Olympic Tournament, where Chile qualified to the 1984 Summer Olympics.

== Coaching career ==
Rodríguez has worked as a goalkeeping coach for Coquimbo Unido and Unión Compañías. In his hometown and La Serena, he also has coached amateur teams like club Justo Donoso.

== Personal life ==
Rodríguez is well-known by his nickname Loco (Madman) and his moustache.

Rodríguez also has worked as a football commentator for media radio such as Radio Montecarlo and Radio Riquelme in his hometown.

In November 2026, Rodríguez suffered a stroke.
