= 1962 Campeonato Nacional Segunda División =

Segunda División
- Season: 1962
- Champions: Coquimbo Unido
- Promoted: Coquimbo Unido
- Relegated: None

The 1962 Segunda División de Chile was the 11th season of the Segunda División de Chile.

Coquimbo Unido was the tournament's champion.

== Table ==
Pos	Team	Pld	W	D	L	GF	GA	GD	Pts
1	Coquimbo Unido (C, P)	22	13	5	4	38	17	+21	31
2	San Antonio Unido	22	13	4	5	39	27	+12	30
3	Lister Rossel	22	12	5	5	47	33	+14	29
4	Universidad Técnica del Estado	22	10	7	5	44	31	+13	27
5	Luis Cruz Martínez	22	8	9	5	36	32	+4	25
6	San Bernardo Central	22	8	5	9	34	31	+3	21
7	Municipal de Santiago	22	8	5	9	28	33	−5	21
8	Ñublense	22	7	6	9	30	31	−1	20
9	Trasandino	22	6	6	10	35	44	−9	18
10	Iberia	22	6	5	11	26	38	−12	17
11	Valparaíso Ferroviarios	22	3	8	11	28	41	−13	14
12	Deportes Colchagua	22	3	5	14	21	48	−27	11

Source: rsssf.com
(C) Champions; (P) Promoted

== See also ==
- Chilean football league system
