= Liminha (footballer, born 1951) =

Brazilian footballer (1951–2000)

Personal information
- Full name: Darcy do Rocio Fortunato da Lima
- Date of birth: 6 May 1951
- Place of birth: Curitiba, Brazil
- Date of death: 14 August 2000 (aged 49)
- Place of death: Curitiba, Brazil
- Position: Forward

Senior career*
Years	Team	Apps	(Gls)
1970–1974	Athletico Paranaense		
1975	São Paulo	15	(2)
1976–1977	Náutico Recife	23	(0)
1978	Coritiba	21	(4)
1979–1980	Coquimbo Unido	54	(34)
1981–1983	Universidad de Chile	48	(15)
1983	Deportes Antofagasta	11	(1)
- * Club domestic league appearances and goals

Darcy do Rocio Fortunato da Lima (6 May 1951 – 14 August 2000), known as Liminha, was a Brazilian footballer who played as a forward for clubs in Brazil and Chile.

== Career ==
Liminha began his career with Athletico Paranaense, with whom he won the Campeonato Paranaense in 1970. In his homeland, he also played for São Paulo, Náutico Recife and Coritiba, with whom he won the Campeonato Paranaense again in 1978. As a member of São Paulo, he also won the 1975 Campeonato Paulista.

In 1979, he emigrated to Chile, with the former Uruguayan international Pedro Rocha as agent, and signed with Coquimbo Unido in the top division, joining his compatriots who had come a year before, Benê and Torino. Torino had recommended him. They three are well remembered by his two seasons together in the squad, despite having been charged with indiscipline acts.

In Chile, he also played for Universidad de Chile (1981–83), becoming the third Brazilian to play for the club after César Maluco and Bráulio and scoring three goals in his debut against San Luis de Quillota, and Deportes Antofagasta (1983).

As an anecdote, he used to celebrate his goals dancing samba alongside a corner flag.

== Personal life ==
He was married to Rita de Cássia Silva Lima and they had a son called Leandro Santiago.

He died due to a serious kidney disease in his city of birth.

== Legacy ==
A street was given his name in Campo do Santana, Curitiba, Brazil.
