= 2009–10 Deportivo de La Coruña season =

Deportivo de La Coruña
2009–10 season
- President: Augusto César Lendoiro
- Manager: Miguel Ángel Lotina
- Stadium: Estadio Riazor
- La Liga: 10th
- Copa del Rey: Quarter-finals
- Top goalscorer: League: Riki (8); All: Riki (8)

The 2009–10 season was Deportivo de La Coruña's 39th season in La Liga, the top division of Spanish football. The season covered the period 1 July 2009 to 30 June 2010.

== Players ==
=== Squad ===
Retrieved on 22 March 2021

Note: Flags indicate national team as defined under FIFA eligibility rules; some limited exceptions apply. Players may hold more than one non-FIFA nationality.

No.	Pos.	Nation	Player
1	GK	ESP	Dani Aranzubia
2	DF	ESP	Manuel Pablo
3	DF	BRA	Filipe Luís
4	DF	ESP	Piscu
5	DF	POR	Zé Castro
6	MF	BRA	Juca
7	DF	ESP	Alberto Lopo
8	MF	ESP	Sergio
9	FW	GEQ	Rodolfo Bodipo
10	FW	ESP	Adrián
11	FW	ESP	Riki
13	GK	ESP	Manu
14	MF	ESP	Pablo Álvarez
15	DF	ESP	Laure
16	MF	ESP	Antonio Tomás

No.	Pos.	Nation	Player
18	MF	MEX	Andrés Guardado
19	DF	ARG	Diego Colotto
20	FW	TUN	Lassad Nouioui
21	MF	ESP	Juan Carlos Valerón
22	MF	ESP	Juan Rodríguez
23	MF	ESP	Iván Pérez
24	FW	ESP	Mista
25	MF	ESP	Juan Domínguez
27	DF	ESP	David Rochela
29	MF	ESP	David Añón
29	MF	ESP	Jairo
31	MF	ESP	Dani Rodríguez
32	DF	ESP	Raúl García
33	DF	ESP	Diego Seoane
38	DF	COL	Brayan Angulo (on loan from Leixões)

==== Out on loan ====
Note: Flags indicate national team as defined under FIFA eligibility rules; some limited exceptions apply. Players may hold more than one non-FIFA nationality.

No. / Pos. / Nation / Player; — / DF / ESP / Aythami (on loan at Xerez)	No. / Pos. / Nation / Player; — / FW / ESP / Rubén Castro (on loan at Rayo Vallecano)

=== Transfers ===
==== In ====
#	Pos	Player	From	Notes
Summer
5	DF	(Portugal) Zé Castro	(Spain) Atlético Madrid	€2 million
6	MF	(Brazil) Juca	(Serbia) Partizan	Free
10	FW	(Spain) Adrián	(Spain) Málaga	Loan return
29	MF	(Spain) Jairo	(Spain) Lorca Deportiva	Loan return
38	DF	(Colombia) Brayan Angulo	(Portugal) Leixões	Loan (€100,000)
	DF	(Spain) Rodri	(Spain) Salamanca	Loan return
	FW	(Mexico) Omar Bravo	(Mexico) Tigres UANL	Loan return
	FW	(Spain) Rubén Castro	(Spain) Huesca	Loan return
	FW	(Uruguay) Sebastián Taborda	(Spain) Hércules	Loan return

==== Out ====
#	Pos	Player	To	Notes
Summer
6	MF	(Canada) Julian de Guzman	(Canada) Toronto	Free
9	FW	(Uruguay) Sebastián Taborda	(Uruguay) Defensor Sporting	
10	MF	(Spain) Joan Verdú	(Spain) Espanyol	Free
13	GK	(Uruguay) Gustavo Munúa	(Spain) Málaga	Free
17	MF	(Spain) Ángel Lafita	(Spain) Real Zaragoza	€3.5 million
20	FW	(Spain) Cristian	(Spain) Hércules	Free
24	DF	(Spain) Pablo Amo	(Spain) Real Zaragoza	Free
25	DF	(Spain) Antonio Barragán	(Spain) Real Valladolid	
30	GK	(Spain) Fabri	(Spain) Real Valladolid	Free
32	DF	(Spain) Juanan	(Spain) Real Madrid Castilla	Free
	DF	(Spain) Rodri	(Spain) Hércules	Free
	MF	(Spain) Iván Carril	(Spain) Pontevedra	Free
	FW	(Mexico) Omar Bravo	(Mexico) Guadalajara	
	FW	(Spain) Rubén Castro	(Spain) Rayo Vallecano	Loan

=== Squad stats ===
Last updated on 7 December 2020.

No.	Pos	Nat	Player	Total		La Liga		Copa del Rey	
No.	Pos	Nat	Player	Apps	Goals	Apps	Goals	Apps	Goals
1	GK	(Spain) ESP	Dani Aranzubia	36	0	36	0	0	0
2	DF	(Spain) ESP	Manuel Pablo	36	0	33	0	1+2	0
3	DF	(Brazil) BRA	Filipe Luís	24	4	20+1	3	3	1
4	DF	(Spain) ESP	Piscu	9	0	3	0	6	0
5	DF	(Portugal) POR	Zé Castro	15	0	8+2	0	5	0
6	MF	(Brazil) BRA	Juca	19	3	14+2	3	2+1	0
7	DF	(Spain) ESP	Alberto Lopo	37	2	34	1	2+1	1
8	MF	(Spain) ESP	Sergio	27	0	21+3	0	3	0
9	FW	(Equatorial Guinea) GEQ	Rodolfo Bodipo	19	1	6+9	0	4	1
10	FW	(Spain) ESP	Adrián	39	4	25+9	4	1+4	0
11	FW	(Spain) ESP	Riki	28	8	18+8	8	1+1	0
13	GK	(Spain) ESP	Manu	9	0	2+1	0	6	0
14	MF	(Spain) ESP	Pablo Álvarez	31	3	17+11	2	3	1
15	DF	(Spain) ESP	Laure	26	0	19+1	0	6	0
16	MF	(Spain) ESP	Antonio Tomás	35	0	28+2	0	4+1	0
18	MF	(Mexico) MEX	Andrés Guardado	27	4	23+3	3	1	1
19	DF	(Argentina) ARG	Diego Colotto	30	3	30	3	0	0
20	FW	(Tunisia) TUN	Lassad Nouioui	20	2	10+9	2	0+1	0
21	MF	(Spain) ESP	Juan Carlos Valerón	27	1	12+12	1	2+1	0
22	MF	(Spain) ESP	Juan Rodríguez	41	4	34+1	3	6	1
23	MF	(Spain) ESP	Iván Pérez	26	0	3+17	0	3+3	0
24	FW	(Spain) ESP	Mista	14	1	5+8	1	1	0
25	MF	(Spain) ESP	Juan Domínguez	15	0	8+5	0	2	0
27	DF	(Spain) ESP	David Rochela	5	0	3+1	0	0+1	0
29	MF	(Spain) ESP	David Añón	4	0	1+2	0	0+1	0
29	MF	(Spain) ESP	Jairo	1	0	0	0	1	0
31	MF	(Spain) ESP	Dani Rodríguez	1	0	0	0	0+1	0
32	DF	(Spain) ESP	Raúl García	5	0	4+1	0	0	0
33	DF	(Spain) ESP	Diego Seoane	2	0	1	0	1	0
38	DF	(Colombia) COL	Brayan Angulo	2	0	0	0	2	0
Players who have left the club after the start of the season:
17	MF	(Spain) ESP	Ángel Lafita	1	0	0+1	0	0	0

== Season results ==
=== Pre-season ===
23 July 2009	Ribeirão (Portugal)	0 – 1	Deportivo La Coruña	Vila Nova de Famalicão, Portugal
		Report	Mista	Stadium: Estádio do Passal

24 July 2009	Feirense (Portugal)	1 – 1	Deportivo La Coruña	Melgaço, Portugal
	Souza 40'	Report	36' Luís	Stadium: Centro de Estágios de Melgaço

29 July 2009 Trofeo Luis Otero	Deportivo La Coruña	0 – 0 (W–L p)	(Saudi Arabia) Al-Ittihad Club	Pontevedra, Spain
		Report		Stadium: Pasarón

29 July 2009 Trofeo Luis Otero	Pontevedra	0 – 2	Deportivo La Coruña	Pontevedra, Spain
		Report	1' Mista; 22' Riki	Stadium: Pasarón

31 July 2009	Toulouse FC (France)	2 – 0	Deportivo La Coruña	Toulouse, France
19:00	Machado 12'; Sissoko 21'	Report		Stadium: Stadium de Toulouse

2 August 2009	Olympique Lyonnais (France)	2 – 2	Deportivo La Coruña	Aix-les-Bains, France
18:30	Gomis 49'; López 74'	Report	4' (pen.) Riki; 84' Juca	Stadium: Stade Forestier

7 August 2009	Vitória de Guimarães (Portugal)	2 – 0	Deportivo La Coruña	Guimarães, Portugal
20:30		Report		Stadium: Estádio D. Afonso Henriques

8 August 2009	Leixões (Portugal)	0 – 0	Deportivo La Coruña	Matosinhos, Portugal
18:45		Report		Stadium: Estádio do Mar

10 August 2009 Teresa Herrera; Trophy	Deportivo La Coruña	1 – 1 (3–4 p)	Atlético Madrid	A Coruña, Spain
21:00	Pérez 51'; Zé Castro (yellow card) 10'	Report	76' (pen.) Jurado; (yellow card) 20' Pablo Ibáñez; (yellow card) 80' Domínguez	Stadium: Estadio Riazor; Attendance: 8,000; Referee: Bernardino González Vázquez
	Penalties
	Sergio (penalty scored); Lafita (penalty scored); Valerón (penalty missed); J. Rodríguez (penalty scored); Pérez (penalty missed)		(penalty scored) Jurado; (penalty scored) Borja Bastón; (penalty missed) Koke; (penalty scored) Sinama Pongolle; (penalty scored) García

13 August 2009 Ramón de Carranza; Trophy; Semi-final	Cádiz	1 – 3	Deportivo La Coruña	Cádiz, Spain
22:00	Toedtli 23'; Erice (yellow card)	Report	34' (pen.) Sergio; 36' Bodipo; 89' Mista; (yellow card) Colotto; (yellow card) Álvarez; (yellow card) J. Rodríguez	Stadium: Ramón de Carranza; Attendance: 6,000; Referee: Alfonso Pino Zamorano

15 August 2009 Ramón de Carranza; Trophy; Final	Sevilla	1 – 0	Deportivo La Coruña	Cádiz, Spain
	Escudé 82'	Report	(yellow card) Lopo; (yellow card) Pérez	Stadium: Ramón de Carranza; Attendance: 3,000; Referee: Javier Turienzo Álvarez

23 August 2009	Osasuna	4 – 2	Deportivo La Coruña	Pamplona, Spain
21:00	Masoud Shojaei 48'; Sergio Fernández 76', 78'; Vadócz 89'	Report	2' J. Rodríguez; 7' Riki; (yellow card) Domínguez	Stadium: Reyno de Navarra; Attendance: 9,153; Referee: Carlos Delgado Ferreiro

=== La Liga ===
==== League table ====
Pos	Team	Pld	W	D	L	GF	GA	GD	Pts	Qualification or relegation
8	Athletic Bilbao	38	15	9	14	50	53	−3	54	
9	Atlético Madrid	38	13	8	17	57	61	−4	47 (Note: DEP 2–1 ATM; ATM 3–0 DEP)	Qualification for the Europa League group stage (Note: Since Atlético Madrid won the 2009–10 UEFA Europa League they earned a spot in the group stage of the 2010–11 UEFA Europa League.)
10	Deportivo La Coruña	38	13	8	17	35	49	−14	47	
11	Espanyol	38	11	11	16	29	46	−17	44	
12	Osasuna	38	11	10	17	37	46	−9	43	

Source: LFP and Yahoo! Sport
Rules for classification: 1) points; 2) head-to-head points; 3) head-to-head goal difference; 4) head-to-head goals scored; 5) goal difference; 6) number of goals scored.

==== Positions by round ====
Team ╲ Round	1	2	3	4	5	6	7	8	9	10	11	12	13	14	15	16	17	18	19	20	21	22	23	24	25	26	27	28	29	30	31	32	33	34	35	36	37	38
Deportivo La Coruña	13	9	13	7	5	4	4	5	6	5	5	5	5	6	6	6	4	5	5	6	6	6	5	6	6	6	7	7	7	8	9	9	9	9	9	10	10	10

2010–11 UEFA Champions League Play-off round
2010–11 UEFA Europa League Play-off round
2010–11 UEFA Europa League Third qualifying round

Source: kicker.de (in German)

==== Matches ====
29 August 2009 1	Real Madrid	3 – 2	Deportivo La Coruña	Madrid, Spain
19:00	Raúl 27'; Ronaldo 35' (pen.); Diarra 60' (yellow card) 55'; Albiol (yellow card) 71'	Report	30' Riki; 46' Valerón; (yellow card) 35' Aranzubia; (yellow card) 81' Lafita	Stadium: Santiago Bernabéu Stadium; Attendance: 79,000; Referee: David Fernández Borbalán

13 September 2009 2	Deportivo La Coruña	1 – 0	Málaga	A Coruña, Spain
16:00	Luís 82'; Álvarez (yellow card) 34'; Riki (yellow card) 44'	Report	(yellow card) 25' Gaspar; (yellow card) 31' Valdo; (yellow card) 56' Mtiliga; (yellow card) 71' Benachour; (yellow card) 79' Munúa	Stadium: Estadio Riazor; Attendance: 15,000; Referee: Javier Turienzo Álvarez

19 September 2009 3	Deportivo La Coruña	2 – 3	Espanyol	A Coruña, Spain
17:00	Adrián 28'; Nouioui 76'; Mista (yellow card) 89'	Report	20' (yellow card) 17' Callejón; 43' Forlín; 54' Verdú; (yellow card) 74' D. García; (yellow card) 90' Pareja	Stadium: Estadio Riazor; Attendance: 32,524; Referee: Fernando Teixeira Vitienes

23 September 2009 4	Xerez	0 – 3	Deportivo La Coruña	Jerez de la Frontera, Spain
19:00	Moreno (yellow card) 42'	Report	26' (yellow card) 27' Juca; 71' (o.g.) Gioda; 78' Riki	Stadium: Chapín; Attendance: 17,200; Referee: Alfonso Pérez

27 September 2009 5	Deportivo La Coruña	1 – 0	Villarreal	A Coruña, Spain
20:00	Juca 8'; Lopo (yellow card) 61'	Report	(yellow card) 20' Marcano; (yellow card) 42' Cani; (yellow card) 76' Pires	Stadium: Estadio Riazor; Attendance: 22,220; Referee: Rafael Ramírez Domínguez

3 October 2009 6	Tenerife	0 – 1	Deportivo La Coruña	Santa Cruz de Tenerife, Spain
17:00	Martínez (yellow card) 66'; Luna (yellow card) 90'	Report	61' Colotto; (yellow card) 34' Álvarez	Stadium: Heliodoro Rodríguez López; Attendance: 24,000; Referee: José Paradas Romero

17 October 2009 7	Deportivo La Coruña	1 – 0	Sevilla	A Coruña, Spain
17:00	J. Rodríguez 38'	Report	(yellow card) 79' Sánchez	Stadium: Estadio Riazor; Attendance: 29,064; Referee: Antonio Mateu

25 October 2009 8	Real Valladolid	4 – 0	Deportivo La Coruña	Valladolid, Spain
16:00	Nauzet 19', 47'; Costa 78' (yellow card) 9'; Medunjanin 89' (yellow card) 90'; Pelé (yellow card) 88'	Report	(yellow card) 60' Colotto	Stadium: José Zorrilla; Attendance: 15,000; Referee: Carlos Delgado Ferreiro

1 November 2009 9	Deportivo La Coruña	1 – 1	Sporting de Gijón	A Coruña, Spain
20:00	Nouioui 42'; Tomás (yellow card) 31'; Lopo (yellow card) 36'	Report	69' Castro; (yellow card) 31' Barral; (yellow card) 64' Matabuena; (yellow card) 90' Canella	Stadium: Estadio Riazor; Attendance: 25,000; Referee: Alfonso Pérez

7 November 2009 10	Getafe	0 – 2	Deportivo La Coruña	Getafe, Spain
17:00	Boateng (yellow card) 55'; Casquero (yellow card) 71'; Torres (yellow card) 88'; Ríos (yellow card) 90'	Report	13' Mista; 59' (yellow card) 29' Luís; (yellow card) (yellow-red card) 26' Riki; (yellow card) (yellow-red card) 72' Sergio; (yellow card) 77' Aranzubia	Stadium: Coliseum Alfonso Pérez; Attendance: 12,000; Referee: José Luis González González

21 November 2009 11	Deportivo La Coruña	2 – 1	Atlético Madrid	A Coruña, Spain
17:00	Colotto 21'; Guardado 90' (pen.); Riki (yellow card) 33'; Mista (yellow card) 35'; Pablo (yellow card) 46'	Report	3' (yellow card) 90' Agüero; (yellow card) 57' Assunção; (yellow card) 90' Domínguez; (red card) 90' Santana	Stadium: Estadio Riazor; Attendance: 17,000; Referee: José Paradas Romero

29 November 2009 12	Racing Santander	0 – 1	Deportivo La Coruña	Santander, Spain
16:00	Geijo (yellow card) 27'; Fernández (yellow card) 75'; Colsa (yellow card) 76'	Report	76' Lopo; (yellow card) 3' Tomás; (yellow card) 31' J. Rodríguez; (yellow card) 62' Riki	Stadium: El Sardinero; Attendance: 12,000; Referee: Javier Turienzo Álvarez

5 December 2009 13	Deportivo La Coruña	1 – 3	Barcelona	A Coruña, Spain
21:00	Adrián 39'; Mista (yellow card) 58'	Report	27', 80' Messi; 87' Ibrahimović; (yellow card) 48' Alves; (yellow card) 77' Abidal	Stadium: Estadio Riazor; Attendance: 34,000; Referee: David Fernández Borbalán

13 December 2009 14	Almería	1 – 1	Deportivo La Coruña	Almería, Spain
16:00	Uche 59'; Soriano (yellow card) 20'	Report	74' Álvarez	Stadium: Estadio de los Juegos Mediterráneos; Attendance: 9,360; Referee: César Muñiz Fernández

20 December 2009 15	Deportivo La Coruña	0 – 0	Valencia	A Coruña, Spain
20:00	J. Rodríguez (yellow card) 84'	Report	(yellow card) 61' Banega; (yellow card) 90' Alba; (yellow card) 90' Sánchez	Stadium: Estadio Riazor; Attendance: 26,988; Referee: Carlos Delgado Ferreiro

3 January 2010 16	Real Zaragoza	0 – 0	Deportivo La Coruña	Zaragoza, Spain
16:00	Aguilar (yellow card) 38'; Lafita (yellow card) 73'; Pulido (yellow card) 78'; López (yellow card) 79'	Report	(yellow card) 38' J. Rodríguez; (yellow card) 72' Domínguez	Stadium: La Romareda; Attendance: 22,000; Referee: Eduardo Iturralde González

10 January 2010 17	Deportivo La Coruña	1 – 0	Osasuna	A Coruña, Spain
16:00	J. Rodríguez 49' (yellow card) 54'; Lopo (yellow card) 79'; Colotto (yellow card) 90'	Report	(red card) 67' Nekounam	Stadium: Estadio Riazor; Attendance: 12,000; Referee: Antonio Rubinos Pérez

17 January 2010 18	Real Mallorca	2 – 0	Deportivo La Coruña	Palma de Mallorca, Spain
16:00	Suárez 46'; Castro 53'; Mattioni (yellow card) 5'; Aduriz (yellow card) 23'	Report	(yellow card) 36' Colotto; (yellow card) 38' Juca; (yellow card) 49' Tomás; (yellow card) 83' J. Rodríguez	Stadium: Ono Estadi; Attendance: 14,000; Referee: Rafael Ramírez Domínguez

23 January 2010 19	Deportivo La Coruña	3 – 1	Athletic Bilbao	A Coruña, Spain
21:00	Luís 49'; Juca 59'; Álvarez 89'; Laure (yellow card) 71'; Lopo (yellow card) 80'	Report	80' (o.g.) Colotto; (yellow card) 65' Martínez; (yellow card) 87' San José; (yellow card) 89' Amorebieta	Stadium: Estadio Riazor; Attendance: 13,000; Referee: Xavier Estrada Fernández

30 January 2010 20	Deportivo La Coruña	1 – 3	Real Madrid	A Coruña, Spain
21:00	Riki 86' (pen.); Juca (yellow card) 62'; Pablo (yellow card) 82'; J. Rodríguez (yellow card) 90'	Report	13' Granero; 40', 90' Benzema	Stadium: Estadio Riazor; Attendance: 34,600; Referee: Miguel Ayza Gámez

7 February 2010 21	Málaga	0 – 0	Deportivo La Coruña	Málaga, Spain
16:00	Benachour (yellow card) 40'; González (yellow card) 62'; Toribio (yellow card) 79'; Caicedo (yellow card) 90'	Report	(yellow card) 25' Colotto; (yellow card) 28' Antonio Tomás; (yellow card) (yellow-red card) 38' Álvarez	Stadium: La Rosaleda; Attendance: 25,000; Referee: Antonio Mateu

14 February 2010 22	Espanyol	2 – 0	Deportivo La Coruña	Barcelona, Spain
16:00	Verdú 39'; Callejón 59'; D. García (yellow card) 22'; Pareja (yellow card) 22'; Márquez (yellow card) 80'	Report	(red card) 55' Tomás; (yellow card) 55' Bodipo; (yellow card) 65' Laure; (yellow card) 78' J. Rodríguez	Stadium: Cornellà-El Prat; Attendance: 24,210; Referee: Carlos Velasco Carballo

20 February 2010 23	Deportivo La Coruña	2 – 1	Xerez	A Coruña, Spain
17:00	Guardado 3' (pen.); Riki 7' (yellow card) 8'; Laure (yellow card) 57'; Lopo (yellow card) 84'	Report	38' (yellow card) 86' Bermejo; (yellow card) 2' Moreno; (yellow card) 42' Francis; (yellow card) 55' Keita; (yellow card) 73' Antoñito	Stadium: Estadio Riazor; Attendance: 12,000; Referee: Miguel Pérez Lasa

28 February 2010 24	Villarreal	1 – 0	Deportivo La Coruña	Villarreal, Spain
16:00	Llorente 36' (yellow card) 20'; López (yellow card) 88'	Report	(yellow card) 20' Guardado; (yellow card) 22' Laure; (yellow card) 89' Añón	Stadium: Estadio El Madrigal; Attendance: 17,000; Referee: Xavier Estrada Fernández

6 March 2010 25	Deportivo La Coruña	3 – 1	Tenerife	A Coruña, Spain
17:00	J. Rodríguez 33' (yellow card) 15'; Guardado 55'; Colotto 67'	Report	17' Juanlu; (yellow card) 27' Alfaro	Stadium: Estadio Riazor; Attendance: 12,000; Referee: José Luis González González

13 March 2010 26	Sevilla	1 – 1	Deportivo La Coruña	Seville, Spain
21:00	Fazio 21'; Perotti (yellow card) 44'; Kanouté (yellow card) 69'	Report	24' Adrián; (yellow card) 20' Colotto; (yellow card) 51' Domínguez; (yellow card) 69' Tomás; (yellow card) 76' Laure	Stadium: Ramón Sánchez Pizjuán; Attendance: 38,675; Referee: Alfonso Álvarez Izquierdo

20 March 2010 27	Deportivo La Coruña	0 – 2	Real Valladolid	A Coruña, Spain
17:00		Report	40' Nauzet; 90' Medunjanin	Stadium: Estadio Riazor; Attendance: 27,000; Referee: Alberto Undiano

23 March 2010 28	Sporting de Gijón	2 – 1	Deportivo La Coruña	Gijón, Spain
19:00	Bilić 30'; Castro 90' (pen.) (yellow card) 60'; Rivera (yellow card) 49'	Report	65' (yellow card) 88' Adrián; (red card) 11' Aranzubia; (yellow card) 88' Pablo; (red card) 90' Lopo	Stadium: El Molinón; Attendance: 18,000; Referee: Antonio Rubinos Pérez

28 March 2010 29	Deportivo La Coruña	1 – 3	Getafe	A Coruña, Spain
16:00	Riki 71'	Report	21', 57' Miku; 32' (o.g.) Zé Castro; (yellow card) 6' del Moral; (yellow card) 37' Celestini; (yellow card) 60' Belenguer; (yellow card) 81' Mané	Stadium: Estadio Riazor; Attendance: 14,000; Referee: César Muñiz Fernández

4 April 2010 30	Atlético Madrid	3 – 0	Deportivo La Coruña	Madrid, Spain
20:00	Juanito 22'; Forlán 57'; Tiago 61'; Simão (yellow card) 33'; Domínguez (yellow card) 73'	Report		Stadium: Estadio Vicente Calderón; Attendance: 35,000; Referee: Miguel Pérez Lasa

11 April 2010 31	Deportivo La Coruña	1 – 1	Racing Santander	A Coruña, Spain
16:00	Riki 1'	Report	85' Moral; (yellow card) 90' Oriol	Stadium: Estadio Riazor; Attendance: 22,000; Referee: Antonio Mateu

14 April 2010 32	Barcelona	3 – 0	Deportivo La Coruña	Barcelona, Spain
21:00	Bojan 16'; Pedro 69'; Touré 72'	Report	(yellow card) 13' Lopo; (yellow card) 30' Álvarez; (yellow card) 79' Pablo	Stadium: Camp Nou; Attendance: 75,897; Referee: José Paradas Romero

18 April 2010 33	Deportivo La Coruña	0 – 0	Almería	A Coruña, Spain
16:00	Tomás (yellow card) 41'; Colotto (yellow card) 47'	Report	(yellow card) 74' Crusat; (yellow card) 82' M'bami	Stadium: Estadio Riazor; Attendance: 12,000; Referee: Eduardo Iturralde González

24 April 2010 34	Valencia	1 – 0	Deportivo La Coruña	Valencia, Spain
21:00	Villa 34' (pen.); Silva (yellow card) 56'; Alexis (yellow card) 75'; Baraja (yellow card) (yellow-red card) 90'	Report	(yellow card) 33' Zé Castro; (yellow card) 72' Nouioui; (yellow card) 90' Tomás	Stadium: Mestalla Stadium; Attendance: 40,000; Referee: David Fernández Borbalán

1 May 2010 35	Deportivo La Coruña	0 – 1	Real Zaragoza	A Coruña, Spain
17:00	Juca (yellow card) 56'; García (yellow card) 71'; J. Rodríguez (yellow card) 82'	Report	50' Colunga; (yellow card) 54' Jarošík; (yellow card) 84' Roberto	Stadium: Estadio Riazor; Attendance: 17,000; Referee: Alfonso Álvarez Izquierdo

5 May 2010 36	Osasuna	3 – 1	Deportivo La Coruña	Pamplona, Spain
19:00	Camuñas 11'; Pandiani 24'; Juanfran 32'; Aranda (yellow card) 27'; Puñal (yellow card) 27'; Azpilicueta (yellow card) 68'	Report	15' Riki	Stadium: Reyno de Navarra; Attendance: 14,417; Referee: José Paradas Romero

8 May 2010 37	Deportivo La Coruña	1 – 0	Real Mallorca	A Coruña, Spain
20:00	Riki 68'; Adrián (yellow card) 75'	Report	(yellow card) 40' Aouate; (yellow card) 51' Martí; (yellow card) 65' Ayoze	Stadium: Estadio Riazor; Attendance: 9,000; Referee: Javier Turienzo Álvarez

15 May 2010 38	Athletic Bilbao	2 – 0	Deportivo La Coruña	Bilbao, Spain
17:00	Muniain 20'; Martínez 77'	Report		Stadium: San Mamés; Attendance: 39,000; Referee: Manuel Mejuto González

=== Copa del Rey ===
==== Round of 32 ====
28 October 2009 First leg	Real Murcia	0 – 1	Deportivo La Coruña	Murcia, Spain
19:00	de Coz (yellow card)	Report	77' Lopo; (yellow card) Sergio	Stadium: Estadio Nueva Condomina; Attendance: 6,533; Referee: Antonio Rubinos Pérez

10 November 2009 Second leg	Deportivo La Coruña	0 – 0	Real Murcia	A Coruña, Spain
19:00		Report	(red card) 73' Bea	Stadium: Estadio Riazor; Attendance: 5,000; Referee: Fernando Teixeira Vitienes

Deportivo La Coruña won 1–0 on aggregate

==== Round of 16 ====
6 January 2010 First leg	Valencia	1 – 2	Deportivo La Coruña	Valencia, Spain
20:00 CET	Silva 72'; Marchena (yellow card) 32'; Dealbert (yellow card) 62'	Report 1 Report 2	47' Guardado; 57' Álvarez; (yellow card) 43' Luís; (yellow card) 71' Sergio	Stadium: Mestalla Stadium; Attendance: 25,000; Referee: Carlos Velasco Carballo

13 January 2010 Second leg	Deportivo La Coruña	2 – 2	Valencia	A Coruña, Spain
20:00 CET	Luís 50'; J. Rodríguez 72'; Pablo (yellow card) 80'; Manu (yellow card) 89'	Report 1 Report 2	11', 29' Žigić; (yellow card) 76' D. Navarro; (yellow card) 79' Albelda; (yellow card) 80' Miguel	Stadium: Estadio Riazor; Attendance: 20,000; Referee: Manuel Mejuto González

Deportivo La Coruña won 4–3 on aggregate

==== Quarter-finals ====
20 January 2010 First leg	Deportivo La Coruña	0 – 3	Sevilla	A Coruña, Spain
22:00 CET		Report	26' Negredo; 67' Renato; 69' Navas	Stadium: Estadio Riazor; Attendance: 14,000; Referee: Eduardo Iturralde González

27 January 2010 Second leg	Sevilla	0 – 1	Deportivo La Coruña	Seville, Spain
22:00 CET	Navarro (yellow card) 88'	Report 1 Report 2	43' Bodipo; (yellow card) 75' Piscu; (yellow card) 81' J. Rodríguez; (yellow card) 89' Rochela	Stadium: Ramón Sánchez Pizjuán; Attendance: 15,000; Referee: Fernando Teixeira Vitienes

Sevilla won 3–1 on aggregate

== Coaching staff ==
Position	Staff
Head coach	(Spain) Miguel Ángel Lotina
Assistant Coach	(Spain) José Luis Ribera

== See also ==
- 2009–10 La Liga
- 2009–10 Copa del Rey
