= 2010–11 Deportivo de La Coruña season =

Deportivo de La Coruña
2010–11 season
- President: Augusto César Lendoiro
- Manager: Miguel Ángel Lotina
- La Liga: 18th (relegated)
- Copa del Rey: Quarter-finals
- Top goalscorer: League: Adrián López (7); All: Adrián López (11)
Home colours	Away colours	Third colours

The 2010–11 season was Deportivo de La Coruña's 40th' season in La Liga, the top division of Spanish football.

The season covered the period of 1 July 2010 to 30 June 2011.

== Players ==
=== Squad information ===
Number	Name	Date of birth	Nationality
Goalkeepers
1	Daniel Aranzubia	September 18, 1979 (age 46)	(Spain)
13	Manu	May 9, 1986 (age 40)	(Spain)
26	Felipe Ramos	January 10, 1988 (age 38)	(Spain)
Defenders
2	Manuel Pablo	January 25, 1976 (age 50)	(Spain)
3	Claudio Morel	February 2, 1978 (age 48)	(Paraguay)
5	Zé Castro	January 13, 1983 (age 43)	(Portugal)
7	Alberto Lopo	May 5, 1980 (age 46)	(Spain)
15	Laure	March 22, 1985 (age 41)	(Spain)
19	Diego Colotto	March 10, 1981 (age 45)	(Argentina)
23	Aythami	April 2, 1986 (age 40)	(Spain)
24	Knut Olav Rindarøy	July 17, 1985 (age 40)	(Norway)
25	Piscu	February 25, 1987 (age 39)	(Spain)
Midfielders
4	Rubén Pérez	April 26, 1989 (age 37)	(Spain)
6	Juca	November 19, 1979 (age 46)	(Brazil)
9	Michel	July 9, 1988 (age 37)	(Spain)
12	Saúl	April 9, 1985 (age 41)	(Spain)
14	Pablo Álvarez	May 14, 1980 (age 46)	(Spain)
16	Antonio Tomás	January 19, 1985 (age 41)	(Spain)
17	Urreta	March 19, 1990 (age 36)	(Uruguay)
18	Andrés Guardado	September 28, 1986 (age 39)	(Mexico)
20	Yves Desmarets	July 19, 1979 (age 46)	(Haiti)
21	Juan Carlos Valerón	June 17, 1975 (age 51)	(Spain)
22	Juan Rodríguez	April 1, 1982 (age 44)	(Spain)
Forwards
10	Adrián	January 8, 1988 (age 38)	(Spain)
11	Riki	August 11, 1980 (age 45)	(Spain)
8	Lassad Nouioui	March 8, 1986 (age 40)	(Tunisia)

== Summer transfers ==
=== In ===
Player	From	Fee
(Haiti) Yves Desmarets	(Portugal) Vitória de Guimarães	Free
(Spain) Saúl	(Spain) Elche	Free
(Paraguay) Claudio Morel	(Argentina) Boca Juniors	Free
(Spain) Felipe Ramos	(Spain) Real Madrid Castilla	Free

=== Loan in ===
Player	From	Fee
(Norway) Knut Olav Rindarøy	(Norway) Molde	Free
(Spain) Rubén Pérez	(Spain) Atlético Madrid B	Free
(Uruguay) Urreta	(Portugal) Benfica	Free
(Spain) Michel	(Spain) Valencia	Free

=== Out ===
Player	New Team	Fee
(Colombia) Brayan Angulo	(Spain) Rayo Vallecano	Free
(Spain) Sergio González	(Spain) Levante	Free
(Brazil) Filipe Luís	(Spain) Atlético Madrid	£11.3M
(Spain) Rubén Castro	(Spain) Real Betis	Free

=== Loan out ===
Player	Team
(Equatorial Guinea) Rodolfo Bodipo	(Spain) Elche
(Spain) Álex Bergantiños	(Spain) Granada
(Spain) Iván Pérez	(Spain) Ponferradina

=== Loan return ===
Italics for players returning to the club but left it during pre-season

Player	From
(Spain) Aythami	(Spain) Xerez

=== Loan end ===
Player	To

== Pre-season ==
The club played a series of friendlies preparing for the new season. Deportivo de La Coruña goals are first.

20 July 2010 Friendly	Deportivo de La Coruña (Spain)	0–1	(Switzerland) Young Boys	Grenchen, Switzerland
	Lopo (yellow card) 83'; Rochela (red card) 38'	(Report)	Mayuka 41'; Spycher (yellow card); Doubaï (yellow card); Dudar (yellow card)	Stadium: Stadion Brühl; Referee: Patrick Graf

23 July 2010 Friendly	Deportivo de La Coruña (Spain)	1–1 (4 – 5 p)	(Netherlands) Twente	Grenchen, Switzerland
	Riki 2', (yellow card) 43'	(Report)	De Jong 18'; Bengtsson (yellow card) 74'	Stadium: Stadion Brühl
	Penalties
	(penalty scored) Castro; (penalty missed) Álvarez; (penalty scored) Aythami; (penalty scored) Nouioui; (penalty scored) Michel; (penalty missed) Saúl		De Jong (penalty scored); Javadov (penalty missed); Rendla (penalty scored); Bajrami (penalty scored); Carney (penalty scored); Tioté (penalty scored)

25 July 2010 Friendly	Deportivo de La Coruña (Spain)	3–3	(Germany) Union Berlin	Berlin, Germany
	Michel 36'; Riki 39'; Desmarets 50'	(Report)	Brunnemann 68'; Mattuschka 85'; Kolk 90'; Younga-Mouhani (yellow card)	Stadium: Stadion An der Alten Försterei; Referee: Bastian Dankert

31 July 2010 Friendly	Deportivo de La Coruña (Spain)	1–0	(England) Cardiff City	Cardiff, Wales
	Dioni 82'	(Report)		Stadium: Cardiff City Stadium; Referee: Mark Whitby

3 August 2010 Friendly	Deportivo de La Coruña (Spain)	0–0 (3 – 5 p)	(England) Newcastle United	A Coruña
	Manu (yellow card) 83'	(Report)		Stadium: Riazor
	Penalties
	(penalty scored) Castro; (penalty missed) Riki; (penalty scored) Aythami; (penalty scored) Guardado		Løvenkrands (penalty scored); Nolan (penalty scored); Carroll (penalty scored); R. Taylor (penalty scored); Barton (penalty scored)

8 August 2010 Friendly	Deportivo de La Coruña (Spain)	0–0 (3 – 5 p)	(England) West Ham United	London, England
		(Report)		Stadium: Upton Park
	Penalties
	(penalty scored) Castro; (penalty scored) Rochela; (penalty missed) Valeron; (penalty scored) Colotto		Noble (penalty scored); Cole (penalty scored); Piquionne (penalty scored); Faubert (penalty scored); Barrera (penalty scored)

12 August 2010 Friendly	Deportivo de La Coruña	3–1	Pontevedra	Lalín
	Valerón 39'; Saúl 48'; Riki 66' (pen.)	(Report)	Reyes 29'; Gerardo (yellow card)	Stadium: Manuel Anxo Cortizo; Referee: Óscar Martínez

18 August 2010 Friendly	Deportivo de La Coruña (Spain)	0–0	(Greece) Olympiacos	Piraeus, Greece
	Guardado (yellow card)	(Report)		Stadium: Karaiskakis Stadium; Referee: Stavros Tritdonis

22 August 2010 Friendly	Deportivo de La Coruña (Spain)	1–3	(Italy) Lazio	Rome, Italy
	Adrián 23'; Álvarez (yellow card)	(Report)	Zárate 11'; Hernanes 72' (pen.); Floccari 77'	Stadium: Stadio Olimpico; Referee: Carmine Russo Italy

== Competitions ==
=== Overview ===
Competition	First match	Last match	Starting round	Final position	Record							
Competition	First match	Last match	Starting round	Final position	Pld	W	D	L	GF	GA	GD	Win %
La Liga	29 August 2010	21 May 2011	Matchday 1	18th	38	10	13	15	31	47	−16	26.32
Copa del Rey	28 October 2010	19 January 2011	Round of 32	Quarter-finals	6	2	2	2	9	8	+1	33.33
Total					44	12	15	17	40	55	−15	27.27

Source: Competitions

=== La Liga ===
==== League table ====
Pos	Team	Pld	W	D	L	GF	GA	GD	Pts	Qualification or relegation
16	Getafe	38	12	8	18	49	60	−11	44 (Note: GET 3–0 MLL; MLL 2–0 GET)	
17	Mallorca	38	12	8	18	41	56	−15	44	
18	Deportivo La Coruña (R)	38	10	13	15	31	47	−16	43	Relegation to the Segunda División
19	Hércules (R)	38	9	8	21	36	60	−24	35	Relegation to the Segunda División
20	Almería (R)	38	6	12	20	36	70	−34	30	Relegation to the Segunda División

Source: LFP, sportec.es, Yahoo! Sport
Rules for classification: 1st points; 2nd head-to-head points; 3rd head-to-head goal difference; 4th head-to-head goals scored; 5th goal difference; 6th number of goals scored; 7th Fair-play points
(R) Relegated

==== Positions by round ====
Team ╲ Round	1	2	3	4	5	6	7	8	9	10	11	12	13	14	15	16	17	18	19	20	21	22	23	24	25	26	27	28	29	30	31	32	33	34	35	36	37	38
Deportivo La Coruña	8	15	14	17	19	20	19	19	19	15	15	13	14	12	13	13	12	13	13	13	14	17	14	13	14	14	13	14	16	16	15	13	13	17	18	16	17	18

Relegation to 2011–12 Segunda División

Source: kicker.de

==== Matches ====
29 August 2010 1	Deportivo de La Coruña	0–0	Zaragoza	A Coruña
17:00 CEST (UTC+2)		(Report)	Gabi (yellow card) 83'	Stadium: Riazor; Attendance: 22,000; Referee: Fernando Teixeira Vitienes

12 September 2010 2	Sevilla	0–0	Deportivo de La Coruña	Sevilla
21:00 CEST (UTC+2)	Zokora (yellow card) 17'; Escudé (yellow card) 67'; Cáceres (yellow card) 74'	(Report)	Tomás (yellow card) 26'; Guardado (yellow card) 79'; Lopo (yellow card) 87'	Stadium: Ramón Sánchez Pizjuán; Attendance: 37,000; Referee: Javier Turienzo Álvarez

20 September 2010 3	Deportivo de La Coruña	2–2	Getafe	A Coruña
21:00 CEST (UTC+2)	Guardado 50' (pen.), 57' (pen.)	(Report)	Colotto 33' (o.g.); Arizmendi 69'	Stadium: Riazor; Attendance: 15,000; Referee: César Muñiz Fernández

22 September 2010 4	Villarreal	1–0	Deportivo de La Coruña	Villarreal
20:00 CEST (UTC+2)	Nilmar 34'; Marchena (yellow card) 17'; Valero (yellow card) 59'	(Report)	Laure (yellow card) 37'; Lopo (yellow card) 68'; Saúl (yellow card) 80'	Stadium: El Madrigal; Attendance: 15,500; Referee: Alfonso Álvarez

26 September 2010 5	Deportivo de La Coruña	0–2	Almería	A Coruña
17:00 CEST (UTC+2)	Colotto (red card) 42'; Adrián (yellow card) 44'; Castro (yellow card) 88'	(Report)	Uche 4', 18'; M'bami (yellow card) 8'; Corona (yellow card) 63'	Stadium: Riazor; Attendance: 14,000; Referee: José González

3 October 2010 6	Real Madrid	6–1	Deportivo de La Coruña	Madrid
21:00 CEST (UTC+2)	Ronaldo 4', 89'; Özil 24'; Di María 34'; Higuaín 53' Castro 60' (o.g.)	(Report)	Rodríguez 78'; Lopo (yellow card) 3'	Stadium: Santiago Bernabéu

17 October 2010 7	Deportivo de La Coruña	0–0	Osasuna	A Coruña
17:00 CEST (UTC+2)		Report		Stadium: Riazor; Referee: Miguel Pérez

25 October 2010 8	Real Sociedad	3–0	Deportivo de La Coruña	San Sebastián
21:00 CEST (UTC+2)	Llorente 16'; Griezmann 70'; Agirretxe 86'	Report		Stadium: Anoeta; Referee: José Paradas

31 October 2010 9	Deportivo de La Coruña	3–0	Espanyol	A Coruña
17:00 CET (UTC+1)	Adrián 28'; Lopo 76'; Colotto 87'	Report		Stadium: Riazor; Referee: Alberto Undiano Mallenco

7 November 2010 10	Levante	1–2	Deportivo de La Coruña	Valencia
17:00 CET (UTC+1)	Juanlu 73'	Report	Riki 10'; Aythami 52'	Stadium: Estadi Ciutat de València; Referee: Fernando Teixeira Vitienes

14 November 2010 11	Mallorca	0–0	Deportivo de La Coruña	Palma de Mallorca
17:00 CET (UTC+1)		Report		Stadium: ONO Estadi; Referee: José Teixeira

21 November 2010 12	Deportivo de La Coruña	3–0	Málaga	A Coruña
17:00 CET (UTC+1)	Adrián 22' (pen.); Colotto 30'; Álvarez 83'	Report		Stadium: Riazor; Referee: Alfonso Álvarez

28 November 2010 13	Racing Santander	1–0	Deportivo de La Coruña	Santander
17:00 CET (UTC+1)	Rosenberg 61'	Report		Stadium: Estadio El Sardinero; Referee: Carlos Clos Gómez

6 December 2010 14	Deportivo de La Coruña	1–0	Hércules	A Coruña
21:00 CET (UTC+1)	Nouioui 73'	Report		Stadium: Riazor; Referee: David Fernández Borbalán

11 December 2010 15	Atlético Madrid	2–0	Deportivo de La Coruña	Madrid
22:00 CET (UTC+1)	Agüero 8', 35'	Report		Stadium: Vicente Calderón; Referee: Xavier Estrada Fernández

18 December 2010 16	Deportivo de La Coruña	1–1	Sporting Gijón	A Coruña
18:00 CET (UTC+1)	Aythami 12'	Report	Castro 89'	Stadium: Riazor; Referee: Carlos Velasco Carballo

2 January 2011 17	Athletic Bilbao	1–2	Deportivo de La Coruña	Bilbao
16:00 CET (UTC+1)	Llorente 86'	Report	Adrián 22' (pen.), 52'	Stadium: San Mamés; Referee: Antonio Rubinos Pérez

8 January 2011 18	Deportivo de La Coruña	0–4	Barcelona	A Coruña
22:00 CET (UTC+1)		Report	Villa 26'; Messi 52'; Iniesta 80'; Pedro 81'	Stadium: Riazor; Referee: Carlos Delgado

16 January 2011 19	Valencia	2–0	Deportivo de La Coruña	Valencia
17:00 CET (UTC+1)	Mathieu 78'; Hernández 90'	Report		Stadium: Mestalla; Referee: Alberto Undiano Mallenco

23 January 2011 20	Zaragoza	1–0	Deportivo de La Coruña	Zaragoza
17:00 CET (UTC+1)	Boutahar 38'	Report		Stadium: La Romareda; Referee: David Fernández Borbalán

29 January 2011 21	Deportivo de La Coruña	3–3	Sevilla	A Coruña
22:00 CET (UTC+1)	Nouioui 15', 62'; Laure 88'	Report	Negredo 63', 79'; Escudé 74'	Stadium: Riazor; Referee: Miguel Ayza

5 February 2011 22	Getafe	4–1	Deportivo de La Coruña	Getafe
18:00 CET (UTC+1)	Colunga 19', 26'; Miku 45'; Ríos 57'	Report	Riki 68' (pen.)	Stadium: Estadio Coliseum; Referee: Alfonso Álvarez

13 February 2011 23	Deportivo de La Coruña	1–0	Villarreal	A Coruña
19:00 CET (UTC+1)	Lopo 60'	Report		Stadium: Riazor; Referee: Rafael Ramírez Domínguez

20 February 2011 24	Almería	1–1	Deportivo de La Coruña	Almería
17:00 CET (UTC+1)	Piatti 48'	Report	Aranzubia 90+4'	Stadium: Estadio de los Juegos Mediterráneos; Referee: José González

26 February 2011 25	Deportivo de La Coruña	0–0	Real Madrid	A Coruña
22:00 CET (UTC+1)		Report		Stadium: Riazor; Referee: David Fernández Borbalán

2 March 2011 26	Osasuna	0–0	Deportivo de La Coruña	Pamplona
20:00 CET (UTC+1)		Report		Stadium: Estadio Reyno de Navarra; Referee: Carlos Delgado

7 March 2011 27	Deportivo de La Coruña	2–1	Real Sociedad	A Coruña
21:00 CET (UTC+1)	Riki 41'; Adrián 52'	Report	Agirretxe 65'	Stadium: Riazor; Referee: Antonio Mateu Lahoz

13 March 2011 28	Espanyol	2–0	Deportivo de La Coruña	Cornellà de Llobregat
17:00 CET (UTC+1)	Alonso 62'; Verdú 81'	Report		Stadium: Estadi Cornellà-El Prat; Referee: José Paradas

20 March 2011 29	Deportivo de La Coruña	0–1	Levante	A Coruña
17:00 CET (UTC+1)		Report	Suárez 90+1'	Stadium: Riazor; Referee: Carlos Clos Gómez

3 April 2011 30	Deportivo de La Coruña	2–1	Mallorca	A Coruña
17:00 CEST (UTC+2)	Xisco 55'; Nouioui 67'	Report	Webó 27'	Stadium: Riazor; Referee: José Teixeira

10 April 2011 31	Málaga	0–0	Deportivo de La Coruña	Málaga
17:00 CEST (UTC+2)		Report		Stadium: La Rosaleda; Referee: Miguel Pérez

17 April 2011 32	Deportivo de La Coruña	2–0	Racing Santander	A Coruña
17:00 CEST (UTC+2)	Nouioui 45+2'; Xisco 49'	Report		Stadium: Riazor; Referee: Alfonso Álvarez

24 April 2011 33	Hércules	1–0	Deportivo de La Coruña	Alicante
17:00 CEST (UTC+2)	Gomes 60'	Report		Stadium: Estadio José Rico Pérez; Referee: Rafael Ramírez Domínguez

30 April 2011 34	Deportivo de La Coruña	0–1	Atlético Madrid	A Coruña
22:00 CEST (UTC+2)		Report	Agüero 80'	Stadium: Riazor; Referee: Javier Turienzo Álvarez

7 May 2011 35	Sporting Gijón	2–2	Deportivo de La Coruña	Gijón
18:00 CEST (UTC+2)	Ayoze 35' (pen.); Barral 90+4' (pen.)	Report	Adrián 9', 40'	Stadium: El Molinón; Referee: Xavier Estrada Fernández

10 May 2011 36	Deportivo de La Coruña	2–1	Athletic Bilbao	A Coruña
20:00 CEST (UTC+2)	Adrián 22'; Castillo 71' (o.g.)	Report	Toquero 3'	Stadium: Riazor; Referee: Antonio Mateu Lahoz

15 May 2011 37	Barcelona	0–0	Deportivo de La Coruña	Barcelona
21:00 CEST (UTC+2)		Report		Stadium: Camp Nou; Referee: Carlos Delgado

21 May 2011 38	Deportivo de La Coruña	0–2	Valencia	A Coruña
22:00 CEST (UTC+2)		Report	Aduriz 4'; Soldado 89'	Stadium: Riazor; Referee: César Muñiz Fernández

=== Copa del Rey ===
==== Round of 32 ====
28 October 2010 First leg	Osasuna	1–1	Deportivo de La Coruña	Pamplona
21:00 CEST (UTC+2)	Juanfran 68'	Report	Saúl 70'	Stadium: Estadio Reyno de Navarra; Referee: Carlos Clos Gómez

10 November 2010 Second leg	Deportivo de La Coruña	2–1 (3–2 agg.)	Osasuna	A Coruña
21:00 CET (UTC+1)	Riki 53'; Nouioui 64'	Report	Lekić 62'	Stadium: Riazor; Referee: David Fernández Borbalán
Note: Deportivo de La Coruña won 3–2 on aggregate.

==== Round of 16 ====
21 December 2010 First leg	Córdoba	1–1	Deportivo de La Coruña	Córdoba
20:00 CET (UTC+1)	Pepe Díaz 71'	Report	Riki 17' (pen.)	Stadium: Estadio Nuevo Arcángel; Referee: José González

5 January 2011 Second leg	Deportivo de La Coruña	3–1 (a.e.t.) (4–2 agg.)	Córdoba	A Coruña
20:00 CET (UTC+1)	Adrián 90' (pen.), 102', 120' (pen.)	Report	Arteaga 86'	Stadium: Riazor; Referee: Alfonso Álvarez
Note: Deportivo de La Coruña won 4–2 on aggregate.

==== Quarter-finals ====
13 January 2011 First leg	Almería	1–0	Deportivo de La Coruña	Almería
20:00 CET (UTC+1)	Ortiz 35'	Report		Stadium: Estadio de los Juegos Mediterráneos; Referee: Xavier Estrada Fernández

19 January 2011 Second leg	Deportivo de La Coruña	2–3 (2–4 agg.)	Almería	A Coruña
20:00 CET (UTC+1)	Álvarez 44' (pen.); Adrián 51'	Report	Corona 19'; Crusat 20'; Goitom 55' (pen.)	Stadium: Riazor; Referee: Eduardo Iturralde González
Note: Almería won 4–2 on aggregate.

== Club ==
=== Coaching staff ===
Position	Staff
Head coach	(Spain) Miguel Ángel Lotina
Assistant Coach	(Spain) José Luis Ribera
Fitness Trainer	(Spain) José Ángel Franganillo Parrado
Goalkeeper Coach	(Spain) Jose Sambade Carreira

== See also ==
- 2010–11 Copa del Rey
- 2010–11 La Liga
