= 2008–09 Deportivo de La Coruña season =

Deportivo de La Coruña
2008–09 season
- President: Augusto César Lendoiro
- Manager: Miguel Ángel Lotina
- Stadium: Estadio Riazor
- La Liga: 7th
- Copa del Rey: Round of 16
- UEFA Intertoto Cup: Winners
- UEFA Cup: Round of 32
- Top goalscorer: League: Ángel Lafita (8); All: Riki; Ángel Lafita (9 each)

The 2008–09 season was Deportivo de La Coruña's 38th season in La Liga, the top division of Spanish football. The season covered the period 1 July 2008 to 30 June 2009.

== Players ==
=== Squad ===
Retrieved on 25 March 2021

Note: Flags indicate national team as defined under FIFA eligibility rules; some limited exceptions apply. Players may hold more than one non-FIFA nationality.

| No. | Pos. | Nation | Player |
|---|---|---|---|
| 1 | GK | ESP | Dani Aranzubia |
| 2 | DF | ESP | Manuel Pablo |
| 3 | DF | BRA | Filipe Luís |
| 4 | DF | ESP | Piscu |
| 5 | DF | POR | Zé Castro (on loan from Atlético Madrid) |
| 6 | MF | CAN | Julian de Guzman |
| 7 | DF | ESP | Alberto Lopo |
| 8 | MF | ESP | Sergio |
| 9 | FW | URU | Sebastián Taborda |
| 10 | MF | ESP | Joan Verdú |
| 11 | FW | ESP | Riki |
| 12 | FW | ESP | Mista |
| 13 | GK | URU | Gustavo Munúa |
| 14 | MF | ESP | Pablo Álvarez |
| 15 | DF | ESP | Laure |
| 16 | MF | ESP | Antonio Tomás |

| No. | Pos. | Nation | Player |
|---|---|---|---|
| 17 | MF | ESP | Ángel Lafita |
| 18 | MF | MEX | Andrés Guardado |
| 19 | DF | ARG | Diego Colotto |
| 20 | FW | ESP | Cristian |
| 21 | MF | ESP | Juan Carlos Valerón |
| 22 | MF | ESP | Juan Rodríguez |
| 23 | FW | GEQ | Rodolfo Bodipo |
| 24 | DF | ESP | Pablo Amo |
| 25 | DF | ESP | Antonio Barragán |
| 30 | GK | ESP | Fabri |
| 32 | DF | ESP | Juanan |
| 36 | FW | TUN | Lassad Nouioui |
| — | GK | ISR | Dudu Aouate |
| — | GK | ESP | Manu |
| — | MF | ESP | Iván Carril |
| — | FW | MEX | Omar Bravo |

==== Out on loan ====
Note: Flags indicate national team as defined under FIFA eligibility rules; some limited exceptions apply. Players may hold more than one non-FIFA nationality.

| No. | Pos. | Nation | Player |
|---|---|---|---|
| — | DF | ESP | Aythami (on loan at Xerez) |
| — | DF | ESP | Rodri (on loan at Marítimo/Salamanca) |

| No. | Pos. | Nation | Player |
|---|---|---|---|
| — | FW | ESP | Adrián (on loan at Málaga) |
| — | FW | ESP | Rubén Castro (on loan at Huesca) |

=== Transfers ===
==== In ====
| # | Pos | Player | From | Notes |
Summer
| 1 | GK | (Spain) Dani Aranzubia | (Spain) Athletic Bilbao | |
| 5 | DF | (Portugal) Zé Castro | (Spain) Atlético Madrid | Loan |
| 12 | FW | (Spain) Mista | (Spain) Atlético Madrid | Free |
| 14 | MF | (Spain) Pablo Álvarez | (Spain) Racing Santander | Loan return |
| 17 | MF | (Spain) Ángel Lafita | (Spain) Real Zaragoza | €2 million |
| 19 | DF | (Argentina) Diego Colotto | (Mexico) Atlas | €2.5 million |
| 26 | MF | (Spain) Iago Iglesias | (Spain) Elche | Loan return |
| | DF | (Spain) Rodri | (Spain) Polideportivo Ejido | Loan return |
| | FW | (Spain) Adrián | (Spain) Deportivo Alavés | Loan return |
| | FW | (Mexico) Omar Bravo | (Mexico) Guadalajara | Free |
Winter
| | DF | (Spain) Rodri | (Portugal) Marítimo | Loan return |

==== Out ====
| # | Pos | Player | From | Notes |
Summer
| 5 | DF | (Argentina) Fabricio Coloccini | (England) Newcastle United | £10.3 million |
| 14 | MF | (Sweden) Christian Wilhelmsson | (France) Nantes | Loan return |
| 15 | FW | (Spain) Rubén Castro | (Spain) Huesca | Loan |
| 23 | FW | (Spain) Xisco | (England) Newcastle United | £5.7–7 million |
| 26 | MF | (Spain) Iago Iglesias | (Spain) Valencia Mestalla | Free |
| 29 | DF | (Spain) Chapi | (Belgium) Zulte Waregem | Free |
| 35 | FW | (Spain) Rubén Rivera | (Spain) Montañeros | |
| | DF | (Spain) Rodri | (Portugal) Marítimo | Loan |
| | MF | (Spain) Momo | (Spain) Xerez | Free |
| | FW | (Spain) Adrián | (Spain) Málaga | Loan |
Winter
| 9 | FW | (Uruguay) Sebastián Taborda | (Spain) Hércules | Loan |
| | GK | (Israel) Dudu Aouate | (Spain) Real Mallorca | €1 million |
| | DF | (Spain) Rodri | (Spain) Salamanca | Loan |
| | FW | (Mexico) Omar Bravo | (Mexico) Tigres UANL | Loan |

=== Squad stats ===
Last updated on 26 March 2021.

| No. | Pos | Nat | Player | Total | | La Liga | | Copa del Rey | | Intertoto Cup | | UEFA Cup | |
| No. | Pos | Nat | Player | Apps | Goals | Apps | Goals | Apps | Goals | Apps | Goals | Apps | Goals |
|---|---|---|---|---|---|---|---|---|---|---|---|---|---|
| 1 | GK | (Spain) ESP | Dani Aranzubia | 47 | 0 | 37 | 0 | 0 | 0 | 0 | 0 | 10 | 0 |
| 2 | DF | (Spain) ESP | Manuel Pablo | 32 | 0 | 23 | 0 | 3 | 0 | 2 | 0 | 4 | 0 |
| 3 | DF | (Brazil) BRA | Filipe Luís | 52 | 2 | 38 | 2 | 2 | 0 | 2 | 0 | 9+1 | 0 |
| 4 | DF | (Spain) ESP | Piscu | 18 | 1 | 7+1 | 1 | 3 | 0 | 0 | 0 | 6+1 | 0 |
| 5 | DF | (Portugal) POR | Zé Castro | 37 | 1 | 29 | 1 | 1+1 | 0 | 0+1 | 0 | 4+1 | 0 |
| 6 | MF | (Canada) CAN | Julian de Guzman | 28 | 0 | 17+3 | 0 | 3 | 0 | 0 | 0 | 4+1 | 0 |
| 7 | DF | (Spain) ESP | Alberto Lopo | 46 | 3 | 32 | 2 | 1+2 | 0 | 2 | 0 | 9 | 1 |
| 8 | MF | (Spain) ESP | Sergio | 39 | 5 | 22+6 | 4 | 0+1 | 0 | 1 | 0 | 8+1 | 1 |
| 10 | MF | (Spain) ESP | Joan Verdú | 41 | 8 | 29+5 | 7 | 2 | 0 | 0+1 | 0 | 0+4 | 1 |
| 11 | FW | (Spain) ESP | Riki | 37 | 9 | 7+21 | 6 | 2 | 1 | 2 | 1 | 3+2 | 1 |
| 12 | FW | (Spain) ESP | Mista | 22 | 1 | 7+6 | 1 | 1+1 | 0 | 0+1 | 0 | 3+3 | 0 |
| 13 | GK | (Uruguay) URU | Gustavo Munúa | 1 | 0 | 1 | 0 | 0 | 0 | 0 | 0 | 0 | 0 |
| 14 | MF | (Spain) ESP | Pablo Álvarez | 27 | 3 | 14+7 | 2 | 3 | 1 | 0+1 | 0 | 1+1 | 0 |
| 15 | DF | (Spain) ESP | Laure | 19 | 0 | 13+1 | 0 | 3 | 0 | 0 | 0 | 2 | 0 |
| 16 | MF | (Spain) ESP | Antonio Tomás | 23 | 0 | 11+1 | 0 | 3 | 0 | 1 | 0 | 6+1 | 0 |
| 17 | MF | (Spain) ESP | Ángel Lafita | 43 | 9 | 25+7 | 8 | 1+1 | 0 | 2 | 1 | 4+3 | 0 |
| 18 | MF | (Mexico) MEX | Andrés Guardado | 38 | 3 | 29 | 2 | 1 | 0 | 0 | 0 | 7+1 | 1 |
| 19 | DF | (Argentina) ARG | Diego Colotto | 20 | 3 | 9+2 | 0 | 3 | 0 | 0 | 0 | 6 | 3 |
| 20 | FW | (Spain) ESP | Cristian | 20 | 0 | 3+10 | 0 | 3 | 0 | 0 | 0 | 3+1 | 0 |
| 21 | MF | (Spain) ESP | Juan Carlos Valerón | 37 | 1 | 6+16 | 0 | 3 | 0 | 2 | 1 | 10 | 0 |
| 22 | MF | (Spain) ESP | Juan Rodríguez | 48 | 2 | 31+6 | 2 | 1+2 | 0 | 2 | 0 | 5+1 | 0 |
| 23 | FW | (Equatorial Guinea) GEQ | Rodolfo Bodipo | 25 | 7 | 14+7 | 5 | 1+1 | 1 | 0 | 0 | 1+1 | 1 |
| 24 | DF | (Spain) ESP | Pablo Amo | 3 | 0 | 2+1 | 0 | 0 | 0 | 0 | 0 | 0 | 0 |
| 25 | DF | (Spain) ESP | Antonio Barragán | 0 | 0 | 0 | 0 | 0 | 0 | 0 | 0 | 0 | 0 |
| 30 | GK | (Spain) ESP | Fabri | 6 | 0 | 0 | 0 | 4 | 0 | 2 | 0 | 0 | 0 |
| 32 | DF | (Spain) ESP | Juanan | 3 | 0 | 0 | 0 | 0 | 0 | 2 | 0 | 0+1 | 0 |
| 36 | FW | (Tunisia) TUN | Lassad Nouioui | 14 | 3 | 10+4 | 3 | 0 | 0 | 0 | 0 | 0 | 0 |
| | GK | (Spain) ESP | Manu | 0 | 0 | 0 | 0 | 0 | 0 | 0 | 0 | 0 | 0 |
| | MF | (Spain) ESP | Iván Carril | 0 | 0 | 0 | 0 | 0 | 0 | 0 | 0 | 0 | 0 |
Players who have left the club after the start of the season:
| 5 | DF | (Argentina) ARG | Fabricio Coloccini | 0 | 0 | 0 | 0 | 0 | 0 | 0 | 0 | 0 | 0 |
| 9 | FW | (Uruguay) URU | Sebastián Taborda | 0 | 0 | 0 | 0 | 0 | 0 | 0 | 0 | 0 | 0 |
| 23 | FW | (Spain) ESP | Xisco | 2 | 0 | 0 | 0 | 0 | 0 | 0+1 | 0 | 0+1 | 0 |
| | GK | (Israel) ISR | Dudu Aouate | 0 | 0 | 0 | 0 | 0 | 0 | 0 | 0 | 0 | 0 |
| | FW | (Spain) ESP | Adrián | 3 | 0 | 0 | 0 | 0 | 0 | 2 | 0 | 1 | 0 |
| | FW | (Mexico) MEX | Omar Bravo | 21 | 3 | 2+7 | 1 | 0+3 | 2 | 0+1 | 0 | 4+4 | 0 |

== Season results ==
=== Pre-season ===
| 17 August 2008 Teresa Herrera; Trophy; Semi-final | Deportivo La Coruña | 2 – 1 | (Mexico) Cruz Azul | A Coruña, Spain |
| | Juanan 80'; Sergio 85' (pen.); Laure (yellow card) 84' | Report | 38' Vigneri | Stadium: Estadio Riazor; Attendance: 4,000; Referee: José Luis González González |

| 19 August 2008 Teresa Herrera; Trophy; Final | Deportivo La Coruña | 2 – 1 | Atlético Madrid | A Coruña, Spain |
| | Sergio 8', 37'; Tomás (yellow card) 77' | Report | 46' Abreu; (yellow card) 63' Sinama Pongolle; (yellow card) 74' Assunção; (red card) 77' Costa | Stadium: Estadio Riazor; Attendance: 8,000; Referee: Fernando Teixeira Vitienes |

=== La Liga ===
==== League table ====
| Pos | Team | Pld | W | D | L | GF | GA | GD | Pts | Qualification or relegation |
|---|---|---|---|---|---|---|---|---|---|---|
| 5 | Villarreal | 38 | 18 | 11 | 9 | 61 | 54 | +7 | 65 | Qualification for the Europa League play-off round |
| 6 | Valencia | 38 | 18 | 8 | 12 | 68 | 54 | +14 | 62 | Qualification for the Europa League play-off round |
| 7 | Deportivo La Coruña | 38 | 16 | 10 | 12 | 48 | 47 | +1 | 58 | |
| 8 | Málaga | 38 | 15 | 10 | 13 | 55 | 59 | −4 | 55 | |
| 9 | Mallorca | 38 | 14 | 9 | 15 | 53 | 60 | −7 | 51 | |

Source: LFP and Yahoo! Sport
Rules for classification: 1) points; 2) head-to-head points; 3) head-to-head goal difference; 4) head-to-head goals scored; 5) goal difference; 6) number of goals scored.

==== Positions by round ====
| Team ╲ Round | 1 | 2 | 3 | 4 | 5 | 6 | 7 | 8 | 9 | 10 | 11 | 12 | 13 | 14 | 15 | 16 | 17 | 18 | 19 | 20 | 21 | 22 | 23 | 24 | 25 | 26 | 27 | 28 | 29 | 30 | 31 | 32 | 33 | 34 | 35 | 36 | 37 | 38 |
|---|---|---|---|---|---|---|---|---|---|---|---|---|---|---|---|---|---|---|---|---|---|---|---|---|---|---|---|---|---|---|---|---|---|---|---|---|---|---|
| Deportivo La Coruña | 4 | 10 | 11 | 12 | 13 | 10 | 11 | 12 | 9 | 6 | 7 | 7 | 7 | 7 | 7 | 7 | 6 | 7 | 8 | 8 | 6 | 8 | 8 | 8 | 8 | 6 | 7 | 7 | 8 | 8 | 8 | 8 | 8 | 7 | 6 | 7 | 7 | 7 |

| 2009–10 UEFA Champions League Play-off round |
| 2009–10 UEFA Europa League Play-off round |
| 2009–10 UEFA Europa League Third qualifying round |

Source: kicker.de (in German)

==== Matches ====
| 31 August 2008 1 | Deportivo La Coruña | 2 – 1 | Real Madrid | A Coruña, Spain |
| 20:00 | Mista 27' (yellow card) 35'; Lopo 51' (yellow card) 31'; Álvarez (yellow card) 75'; Aranzubia (yellow card) 78' | Report | 48' van Nistelrooy; (yellow card) 54' Guti; (yellow card) 69' Ramos; (yellow card) 85' Marcelo | Stadium: Estadio Riazor; Attendance: 33,000; Referee: César Muñiz Fernández |

| 14 September 2008 2 | Villarreal | 1 – 0 | Deportivo La Coruña | Villarreal, Spain |
| 16:00 | Cazorla 27'; Franco (yellow card) 9'; Senna (yellow card) 12'; Fuentes (yellow card) 67' | Report | (yellow card) 16' Tomás | Stadium: Estadio El Madrigal; Attendance: 22,000; Referee: Arturo Daudén Ibáñez |

| 21 September 2008 3 | Deportivo La Coruña | 0 – 0 | Real Mallorca | A Coruña, Spain |
| 16:00 | Álvarez (yellow card) 11'; Tomás (yellow card) 40'; Lopo (yellow card) 53'; Bravo (red card) 59'; Rodíguez (yellow card) 68'; Laure (yellow card) 80' | Report | (yellow card) 59' Nunes; (yellow card) 65' Suárez; (yellow card) 69' Ayoze; (yellow card) (yellow-red card) 79' Navarro | Stadium: Estadio Riazor; Attendance: 22,000; Referee: Miguel Ayza Gámez |

| 24 September 2008 4 | Osasuna | 0 – 0 | Deportivo La Coruña | Pamplona, Spain |
| 19:00 | Juanfran (yellow card) 82' | Report | (yellow card) 28' Piscu; (yellow card) (yellow-red card) 53' de Guzman; (yellow card) 54' Sergio | Stadium: Reyno de Navarra; Attendance: 16,437; Referee: Rafael Ramírez Domínguez |

| 28 September 2008 5 | Valencia | 4 – 2 | Deportivo La Coruña | Valencia, Spain |
| 18:00 | Mata 34'; Villa 49', 82'; Joaquín 68'; Albelda (yellow card) 85'; Moretti (yellow card) 86' | Report | 10' (o.g.) Moretti; 85' Lafita; (yellow card) 23' Luís; (yellow card) 71' Laure | Stadium: Mestalla Stadium; Attendance: 45,000; Referee: Miguel Pérez Lasa |

| 5 October 2008 6 | Deportivo La Coruña | 1 – 0 | Numancia | A Coruña, Spain |
| 16:00 | Lafita 13'; Lopo (yellow card) 43' | Report | (yellow card) 24' Cisma; (yellow card) 31' Palacios; (yellow card) 63' Juanra | Stadium: Estadio Riazor; Attendance: 22,000; Referee: Alfonso Álvarez Izquierdo |

| 19 October 2008 7 | Racing Santander | 0 – 0 | Deportivo La Coruña | Santander, Spain |
| 16:00 | Pinillos (yellow card) 7'; Serrano (yellow card) 28'; Luccin (yellow card) (yellow-red card) 87' | Report | (yellow card) 18' Luís; (yellow card) 89' Pablo | Stadium: El Sardinero; Attendance: 17,794; Referee: José Paradas Romero |

| 26 October 2008 8 | Deportivo La Coruña | 0 – 3 | Sporting de Gijón | A Coruña, Spain |
| 16:00 | Valerón (yellow card) 39'; Colotto (red card) 42'; Aranzubia (yellow card) 45' | Report | 22' (pen.) Barral; 26' Carmelo; 84' Castro; (yellow card) 36' Neru; (yellow card) 40' Camacho; (yellow card) 73' Míchel | Stadium: Estadio Riazor; Attendance: 22,000; Referee: Fernando Teixeira Vitienes |

| 2 November 2008 9 | Real Betis | 0 – 3 | Deportivo La Coruña | Seville, Spain |
| 20:00 | García (yellow card) (yellow-red card) 80'; Aurélio (yellow card) 83' | Report | 60' Riki; 79', 87' Lafita; (yellow card) 32' Sergio | Stadium: Estadio Manuel Ruiz de Lopera; Attendance: 38,000; Referee: Carlos Delgado Ferreiro |

| 9 November 2008 10 | Deportivo La Coruña | 1 – 0 | Espanyol | A Coruña, Spain |
| 16:00 | Guardado 37'; Lafita (yellow card) 60' | Report | (yellow card) 70' Ángel Martínez; (yellow card) 77' Sánchez | Stadium: Estadio Riazor; Attendance: 14,000; Referee: Rafael Ramírez Domínguez |

| 16 November 2008 11 | Atlético Madrid | 4 – 1 | Deportivo La Coruña | Madrid, Spain |
| 16:00 | Heitinga 26'; Forlán 52', 81'; Rodríguez 67' | Report | 86' Luís; (yellow card) 38' Lopo; (yellow card) 61' Rodríguez | Stadium: Estadio Vicente Calderón; Attendance: 44,000; Referee: Antonio Mateu |

| 23 November 2008 12 | Deportivo La Coruña | 3 – 1 | Athletic Bilbao | A Coruña, Spain |
| 20:00 | Zé Castro 20' (yellow card) 88'; Verdú 43' (pen.) (yellow card) 90'; Guardado 90' (yellow card) 19' | Report | 71' Martínez; (penalty missed) 25' Iraola; (yellow card) 32' D. López; (yellow card) 47' Orbaiz | Stadium: Estadio Riazor; Attendance: 20,000; Referee: Manuel Mejuto González |

| 30 November 2008 13 | Almería | 0 – 1 | Deportivo La Coruña | Almería, Spain |
| 16:00 | Crusat (yellow card) 53'; Negredo (red card) 53'; García (yellow card) 60' | Report | 76' (penalty missed) 68' Verdú; (yellow card) 17' Lopo; (yellow card) 48' Lafita; (yellow card) 60' Mista; (yellow card) 77' Tomás; (yellow card) 90' Riki | Stadium: Estadio de los Juegos Mediterráneos; Attendance: 12,000; Referee: Eduardo Iturralde González |

| 7 December 2008 14 | Deportivo La Coruña | 2 – 0 | Málaga | A Coruña, Spain |
| 16:00 | Lafita 65'; Bravo 69' (pen.); Lopo (yellow card) 34'; Verdú (yellow card) 71' | Report | (yellow card) 59' Miguel Ángel; (yellow card) 64' Cuadrado | Stadium: Estadio Riazor; Attendance: 22,000; Referee: Carlos Clos |

| 14 December 2008 15 | Real Valladolid | 3 – 0 | Deportivo La Coruña | Valladolid, Spain |
| 16:00 | Sesma 15'; López 25'; León 56'; Marcos (yellow card) 52' | Report | (yellow card) 29' Mista; (yellow card) 86' Zé Castro | Stadium: José Zorrilla; Attendance: 14,900; Referee: Carlos Velasco Carballo |

| 21 December 2008 16 | Deportivo La Coruña | 4 – 1 | Recreativo de Huelva | A Coruña, Spain |
| 16:00 | Lopo 9'; Sergio 20' (pen.); Bodipo 44'; Luís 90'; Aranzubia (yellow card) 22'; Pablo (yellow card) 23'; Zé Castro (yellow card) 41' | Report | 24' (pen.) Colunga; (yellow card) 63' Camuñas | Stadium: Estadio Riazor; Attendance: 12,000; Referee: Javier Turienzo Álvarez |

| 4 January 2009 17 | Getafe | 1 – 2 | Deportivo La Coruña | Getafe, Spain |
| 20:00 | del Moral 15'; Mario Abrante (yellow card) 53'; Contra (yellow card) 54'; Díaz (yellow card) 57'; Polanski (yellow card) 65'; Licht (yellow card) 75'; Abbondanzieri (yellow card) 80' | Report | 6' (yellow card) 54' Bodipo; 80' (pen.) Sergio; (yellow card) 36' Luís; (yellow card) 60' Rodríguez; (yellow card) 71' Zé Castro; (yellow card) 75' Pablo | Stadium: Coliseum Alfonso Pérez; Attendance: 9,000; Referee: David Fernández Borbalán |

| 10 January 2009 18 | Deportivo La Coruña | 1 – 3 | Sevilla | A Coruña, Spain |
| 19:00 | Bodipo 34'; Lopo (yellow card) 90' | Report | 50' Fabiano; 78' Renato; 90' Capel; (yellow card) 19' Navarro; (yellow card) 36' Crespo; (red card) 41' Maresca | Stadium: Estadio Riazor; Attendance: 20,000; Referee: Antonio Rubinos Pérez |

| 17 January 2009 19 | Barcelona | 5 – 0 | Deportivo La Coruña | Barcelona, Spain |
| 19:00 | Messi 21'; Henry 27', 82'; Eto'o 41', 86' (pen.) | Report | (red card) 84' Aranzubia | Stadium: Camp Nou; Attendance: 65,145; Referee: Julián Rodríguez Santiago |

| 25 January 2009 20 | Real Madrid | 1 – 0 | Deportivo La Coruña | Madrid, Spain |
| 20:00 | Raúl 39'; Diarra (yellow card) 69'; Pepe (yellow card) 77' | Report | (yellow card) 8' de Guzman; (yellow card) 79' Tomás | Stadium: Santiago Bernabéu Stadium; Attendance: 65,000; Referee: Fernando Teixeira Vitienes |

| 1 February 2009 21 | Deportivo La Coruña | 3 – 0 | Villarreal | A Coruña, Spain |
| 16:00 | Lafita 1', 62'; Riki 67'; Pablo (yellow card) 17'; Lopo (yellow card) 74'; Verdú (yellow card) 79' | Report | (penalty missed) 74' Senna; (yellow card) 16' Eguren; (yellow card) 34' Venta; (yellow card) 36' Llorente; (yellow card) 79' Ibagaza | Stadium: Estadio Riazor; Attendance: 22,000; Referee: Carlos Velasco Carballo |

| 8 February 2009 22 | Real Mallorca | 1 – 1 | Deportivo La Coruña | Palma de Mallorca, Spain |
| 16:00 | Aduriz 55'; Martí (yellow card) 48'; Corrales (yellow card) (yellow-red card) 82'; Josemi (yellow card) 90'; Santana (yellow card) 90' | Report | 77' (pen.) Verdú; (yellow card) 15' Piscu; (yellow card) 38' de Guzman; (yellow card) 67' Tomás; (yellow card) 90' Laure | Stadium: Ono Estadi; Attendance: 15,000; Referee: Miguel Ayza Gámez |

| 14 February 2009 23 | Deportivo La Coruña | 0 – 0 | Osasuna | A Coruña, Spain |
| 19:00 | de Guzman (yellow card) 56'; Zé Castro (yellow card) 71' | Report | (yellow card) 65' Nekounam; (yellow card) 78' Monreal | Stadium: Estadio Riazor; Attendance: 22,000; Referee: Carlos Megía Dávila |

| 22 February 2009 24 | Deportivo La Coruña | 1 – 1 | Valencia | A Coruña, Spain |
| 20:00 | Piscu 79'; Lopo (yellow card) 90' | Report | 24' (yellow card) (yellow-red card) 76' Villa; (yellow card) 18' Alexis; (yellow card) 36' Joaquín; (yellow card) 40' Silva; (yellow card) 68' Baraja; (yellow card) 86' Sánchez; (yellow card) 87' Marchena; (yellow card) 90' Míchel | Stadium: Estadio Riazor; Attendance: 18,000; Referee: Alfonso Pérez |

| 1 March 2009 25 | Numancia | 0 – 1 | Deportivo La Coruña | Soria, Spain |
| 16:00 | del Pino (yellow card) 38'; Brit (yellow card) 45' | Report | 74' Rodríguez; (yellow card) 40' Verdú; (yellow card) 64' de Guzman | Stadium: Los Pajaritos; Attendance: 8,000; Referee: Rafael Ramírez Domínguez |

| 8 March 2009 26 | Deportivo La Coruña | 5 – 3 | Racing Santander | A Coruña, Spain |
| 16:00 | Rodríguez 25'; Riki 50', 59'; Lafita 58'; Verdú 67'; Sergio (yellow card) 63' | Report | 1' (yellow card) 34' Pereira; 32' Žigić; 79' Berrocal; (yellow card) 16' Oriol; (yellow card) 18' Luccin | Stadium: Estadio Riazor; Attendance: 16,000; Referee: Antonio Mateu |

| 15 March 2009 27 | Sporting de Gijón | 3 – 2 | Deportivo La Coruña | Gijón, Spain |
| 16:00 | Morán 48'; Barral 52' (pen.); José Ángel 71' (yellow card) 72'; Hernández (yellow card) 58'; Neru (yellow card) 67'; Cámara (yellow card) 85' | Report | 67' (pen.) Sergio; 85' (pen.) Riki; (yellow card) 31' Luís; (yellow card) 51' Lopo; (yellow card) 70' Rodríguez | Stadium: El Molinón; Attendance: 25,000; Referee: Julián Rodríguez Santiago |

| 22 March 2009 28 | Deportivo La Coruña | 1 – 1 | Real Betis | A Coruña, Spain |
| 16:00 | Verdú 8'; Sergio (yellow card) 53'; Rodríguez (yellow card) 63' | Report | 32' García; (yellow card) 50' González; (yellow card) 70' Melli; (yellow card) 78' Arzu; (yellow card) 87' Oliveira | Stadium: Estadio Riazor; Attendance: 20,000; Referee: Miguel Ayza Gámez |

| 5 April 2009 29 | Espanyol | 3 – 1 | Deportivo La Coruña | Barcelona, Spain |
| 16:00 | Alonso 12' de la Peña 39'; Lopo 90' (o.g.); Jarque (yellow card) 51'; Tamudo (yellow card) 55'; Nenê (yellow card) 82' | Report | 42' Nouioui; (yellow card) 13' Verdú; (yellow card) 44' Lopo; (yellow card) 62' Laure | Stadium: Estadi Olímpic Lluís Companys; Attendance: 23,000; Referee: Luis Medina Cantalejo |

| 12 April 2009 30 | Deportivo La Coruña | 1 – 2 | Atlético Madrid | A Coruña, Spain |
| 20:00 | Bodipo 87'; Lafita (yellow card) 14'; Amo (yellow card) 32'; Rodríguez (yellow card) 57' | Report | 45' Agüero; 69' Simão; (yellow card) 11' Ibáñez; (yellow card) 35' Rodríguez; (yellow card) 42' Heitinga; (yellow card) 63' Assunção; (yellow card) 86' Pernía | Stadium: Estadio Riazor; Attendance: 24,000; Referee: Carlos Delgado Ferreiro |

| 18 April 2009 31 | Athletic Bilbao | 0 – 1 | Deportivo La Coruña | Bilbao, Spain |
| 19:00 | Ustaritz (yellow card) 19'; Etxeita (yellow card) 68'; Orbaiz (yellow card) 88'; Martínez (red card) 90' | Report | 85' Álvarez; (yellow card) 15' Rodríguez; (yellow card) 79' Colotto | Stadium: San Mamés; Attendance: 35,000; Referee: Carlos Clos |

| 22 April 2009 32 | Deportivo La Coruña | 2 – 0 | Almería | A Coruña, Spain |
| 19:00 | Verdú 49'; Nouioui 68'; Colotto (yellow card) 44'; Bodipo (yellow card) 56' | Report | (yellow card) 41' Mané | Stadium: Estadio Riazor; Attendance: 14,000; Referee: Eduardo Iturralde González |

| 25 April 2009 33 | Málaga | 1 – 1 | Deportivo La Coruña | Málaga, Spain |
| 19:00 | Luque 33'; Apoño (penalty missed) 86'; Salva (yellow card) 27'; Gaspar (yellow card) 38'; Duda (yellow card) 65' | Report | 49' Sergio; (yellow card) 40' Zé Castro; (yellow card) 83' Colotto | Stadium: La Rosaleda; Attendance: 25,000; Referee: Alfonso Álvarez Izquierdo |

| 3 May 2009 34 | Deportivo La Coruña | 1 – 0 | Real Valladolid | A Coruña, Spain |
| 16:00 | Nouioui 8'; Zé Castro (yellow card) 42'; Sergio (yellow card) 53' | Report | (yellow card) 23' León; (yellow card) 32' Ogbeche; (red card) 90' Prieto | Stadium: Estadio Riazor; Attendance: 16,000; Referee: Carlos Delgado Ferreiro |

| 10 May 2009 35 | Recreativo de Huelva | 1 – 2 | Deportivo La Coruña | Huelva, Spain |
| 16:00 | Colunga 44'; Vázquez (yellow card) 53'; Arzo (yellow card) 79' | Report | 17' Verdú; 49' (yellow card) 51' Álvarez; (yellow card) 90' Lafita | Stadium: Nuevo Colombino; Attendance: 17,341; Referee: Alberto Undiano |

| 16 May 2009 36 | Deportivo La Coruña | 1 – 1 | Getafe | A Coruña, Spain |
| 19:00 | Riki 86'; Rodríguez (yellow card) 56'; Lopo (yellow card) 80' | Report | 46' Soldado; (yellow card) 37' Díaz; (yellow card) 62' Celestini; (yellow card) 85' del Moral | Stadium: Estadio Riazor; Attendance: 14,000; Referee: David Fernández Borbalán |

| 23 May 2009 37 | Sevilla | 1 – 0 | Deportivo La Coruña | Seville, Spain |
| 20:00 | Perotti 90'; Navarro (yellow card) 83' | Report | (yellow card) 60' Bodipo; (yellow card) 81' Rodríguez | Stadium: Ramón Sánchez Pizjuán; Attendance: 45,000; Referee: Carlos Clos |

| 30 May 2009 38 | Deportivo La Coruña | 1 – 1 | Barcelona | A Coruña, Spain |
| 20:00 | Bodipo 31'; Sergio (yellow card) 54' | Report | 89' Eto'o; (yellow card) 44' Bojan | Stadium: Estadio Riazor; Attendance: 34,000; Referee: Luis Medina Cantalejo |

=== Copa del Rey ===
==== Round of 32 ====
| 29 October 2008 First leg | Elche | 0 – 2 | Deportivo La Coruña | Elche, Spain |
| 20:00 | Amaya (yellow card) 38' | Report | 27' Riki; 72' Bodipo; (yellow card) 18' de Guzman; (yellow card) 29' Laure; (yellow card) 66' Piscu; (yellow card) 75' de Guzman | Stadium: Estadio Manuel Martínez Valero; Referee: David Fernández Borbalán |

| 12 November 2008 Second leg | Deportivo La Coruña | 2 – 0 | Elche | A Coruña, Spain |
| 20:00 | Álvarez 60'; Bravo 74'; Cristiano (yellow card) 70' | Report | (yellow card) 60' Amaya | Stadium: Estadio Riazor; Referee: Miguel Pérez Lasa |

Deportivo La Coruña won 4–0 on aggregate

==== Round of 16 ====
| 7 January 2009 First leg | Sevilla | 2 – 1 | Deportivo La Coruña | Seville, Spain |
| 20:00 | Fabiano 30'; Kanouté 39' (yellow card) 40'; Crespo (yellow card) 42' | Report | 80' Bravo; (yellow card) 27' Laure; (yellow card) 29' Lopo; (yellow card) 37' de Guzman | Stadium: Ramón Sánchez Pizjuán; Referee: Antonio Mateu |

| 14 January 2009 Second leg | Deportivo La Coruña | 0 – 3 | Sevilla | A Coruña, Spain |
| 19:00 | de Guzman (yellow card) 12'; Bravo (red card) 70' | Report | 1' Navas; 22', 40' Fabiano; (yellow card) 29' Crespo; (yellow card) 32' Romaric; (red card) 83' Palop | Stadium: Estadio Riazor; Referee: Carlos Megía Dávila |

Sevilla won 5–1 on aggregate

=== UEFA Intertoto Cup ===
==== Third round ====
| 19 July 2008 First leg | Bnei Sakhnin (Israel) | 1 – 2 | (Spain) Deportivo La Coruña | Haifa, Israel |
| 18:00 | B. Ganayem 59'; Lenkebe (yellow card) 59' | Report | 54' Lafita; 57' Riki; (yellow card) 50' Rodríguez; (yellow card) 82' Xisco | Stadium: Kiryat Eliezer Stadium; Attendance: 3,000; Referee: Fredy Fautrel (France) |

| 26 July 2008 Second leg | Deportivo La Coruña (Spain) | 1 – 0 | (Israel) Bnei Sakhnin | A Coruña, Spain |
| 20:00 | Valerón 40'; Luís (yellow card) | Report | | Stadium: Estadio Riazor; Attendance: 6,000; Referee: Bas Nijhuis (Netherlands) |

Deportivo La Coruña won 3–1 on aggregate

=== UEFA Cup ===
==== Qualifying rounds ====
| 14 August 2008 Second qualifying round First leg | Deportivo La Coruña (Spain) | 0 – 0 | (Croatia) Hajduk Split | A Coruña, Spain |
| 21:00 CET | | Report | (yellow card) Gabrić; (yellow card) Ibričić; (yellow card) Oremuš; (yellow card) Rubil; (yellow card) Skoko; (yellow card) Subašić | Stadium: Estadio Riazor; Referee: Cüneyt Çakır (Turkey) |

| 28 August 2008 Second qualifying round Second leg | Hajduk Split (Croatia) | 0 – 2 | (Spain) Deportivo La Coruña | Split, Croatia |
| 20:45 CET | Maloča (yellow card) 33'; J. Buljat (yellow card) 40'; Andrić (yellow card) (yellow-red card) 65' | Report 1 Report 2 | 42' Riki; 87' (pen.) Verdú; (yellow card) (yellow-red card) 90' de Guzman; (yellow card) Laure | Stadium: Poljud; Attendance: 35,000; Referee: Gianluca Rocchi (Italy) |

Deportivo La Coruña won 2–0 on aggregate

==== First round ====
| 18 September 2008 First leg | Brann (Norway) | 2 – 0 | (Spain) Deportivo La Coruña | Bergen, Norway |
| 19:00 CET | Bjarnason 25' (pen.); Solli 39'; Austin (yellow card); Björnsson | Report | (yellow card) Cristian; (yellow card) Guardado; (yellow card) Lopo; (yellow card) Rodríguez; (yellow card) Sergio | Stadium: Brann Stadion; Attendance: 8,777; Referee: Johan Verbist (Austria) |

| 2 October 2008 Second leg | Deportivo La Coruña (Spain) | 2 – 0 (a.e.t.) (3–2 p) | (Norway) Brann | A Coruña, Spain |
| 21:00 | Colotto 18', 76'; Riki (yellow card) (yellow-red card) 29'; Mista (yellow card) | Report | (yellow card) Bakke; (yellow card) Björnsson; (yellow card) Dahl; (yellow card) Hanstveit; (yellow card) Solli; (yellow card) Udjus; (yellow card) Vaagan Moen | Stadium: Estadio Riazor; Attendance: 20,000; Referee: Pavel Královec (Czech Republic) |
| | Penalties |
| | Sergio (penalty scored); Mista (penalty missed); Guardado (penalty scored); Verdú (penalty scored) | | (penalty scored) Bjarnason; (penalty missed) Vaagan Moen; (penalty missed) Bakke; (penalty scored) Austin; (penalty missed) Hanstveit |

2–2 on aggregate. Deportivo La Coruña won 3–2 on penalties

==== Group H ====
| Team | Pld | W | D | L | GF | GA | GD | Pts |
|---|---|---|---|---|---|---|---|---|
| (Russia) CSKA Moscow | 4 | 4 | 0 | 0 | 12 | 5 | +7 | 12 |
| (Spain) Deportivo La Coruña | 4 | 2 | 1 | 1 | 5 | 4 | +1 | 7 |
| (Poland) Lech Poznań | 4 | 1 | 2 | 1 | 5 | 5 | 0 | 5 |
| (France) Nancy | 4 | 1 | 1 | 2 | 8 | 7 | +1 | 4 |
| (Netherlands) Feyenoord | 4 | 0 | 0 | 4 | 1 | 10 | −9 | 0 |

Source: RSSSF

| 23 October 2008 1 | CSKA Moscow (Russia) | 3 – 0 | (Spain) Deportivo La Coruña | Moscow, Russia |
| 20:00 MSK | Dzagoev 9', 12'; Vágner Love 61'; Aldonin (yellow card); Berezutski (yellow card); Grigoryev (yellow card); Šemberas (yellow card) | Report | (yellow card) Lopo; (yellow card) Piscu | Stadium: Luzhniki Stadium; Attendance: 13,060; Referee: Alon Yefet (Israel) |

| 27 November 2008 2 | Deportivo La Coruña (Spain) | 3 – 0 | (Netherlands) Feyenoord | A Coruña, Spain |
| 21:00 CET | Lopo 30'; Hofland 50' (o.g.); Guardado 51' (yellow card); Tomás (yellow card) | Report | | Stadium: Estadio Riazor; Attendance: 20,000; Referee: Martin Ingvarsson (Sweden) |

| 4 December 2008 3 | Lech Poznań (Poland) | 1 – 1 | (Spain) Deportivo La Coruña | Poznań, Poland |
| 20:45 CET | Rengifo 42'; Štilić (yellow card) | Report | 2' Colotto | Stadium: Stadion Miejski; Attendance: 21,000; Referee: Craig Thomson (Scotland) |

| 17 December 2008 4 | Deportivo La Coruña (Spain) | 1 – 0 | (France) Nancy | A Coruña, Spain |
| 20:45 CET | Bodipo 74' (yellow card) | Report | (yellow card) Berenguer; (yellow card) Bracigliano; (yellow card) Féret; (yellow card) Macaluso; (yellow card) Zerka | Stadium: Estadio Riazor; Attendance: 15,000; Referee: Michael Weiner (Germany) |

==== Final phase ====
| 18 February 2009 Round of 32; First leg | AaB (Denmark) | 3 – 0 | (Spain) Deportivo La Coruña | Aalborg, Denmark |
| 21:00 | Due 53', 71'; Jakobsen 90' (pen.) (yellow card); Augustinussen (yellow card); Enevoldsen (yellow card) | Report | (yellow card) Álvarez; (yellow card) Aranzubia; (yellow card) Lopo; (yellow card) Luís | Stadium: Energi Nord Arena; Attendance: 7,987; Referee: Nikolai Ivanov (Russia) |

| 26 February 2009 Round of 32; Second leg | Deportivo La Coruña (Spain) | 1 – 3 | (Denmark) AaB | A Coruña, Spain |
| 21:00 | Sergio 38'; Álvarez (yellow card) (yellow-red card) 90+2'; Piscu (yellow card) | Report | 41' Shelton; 45' Johansson; 45+1' Enevoldsen; (yellow card) Curth; (yellow card) Jakobsen | Stadium: Estadio Riazor; Attendance: 16,000; Referee: Alan Kelly (Ireland) |

AaB won 6–1 on aggregate

== Coaching staff ==
| Position | Staff |
|---|---|
| Head coach | (Spain) Miguel Ángel Lotina |
| Assistant Coach | (Spain) José Luis Ribera |

== See also ==
- 2008–09 La Liga
- 2008–09 Copa del Rey
- 2008 UEFA Intertoto Cup
- 2008–09 UEFA Cup
