= Diego Seoane (Spanish footballer) =

Spanish footballer

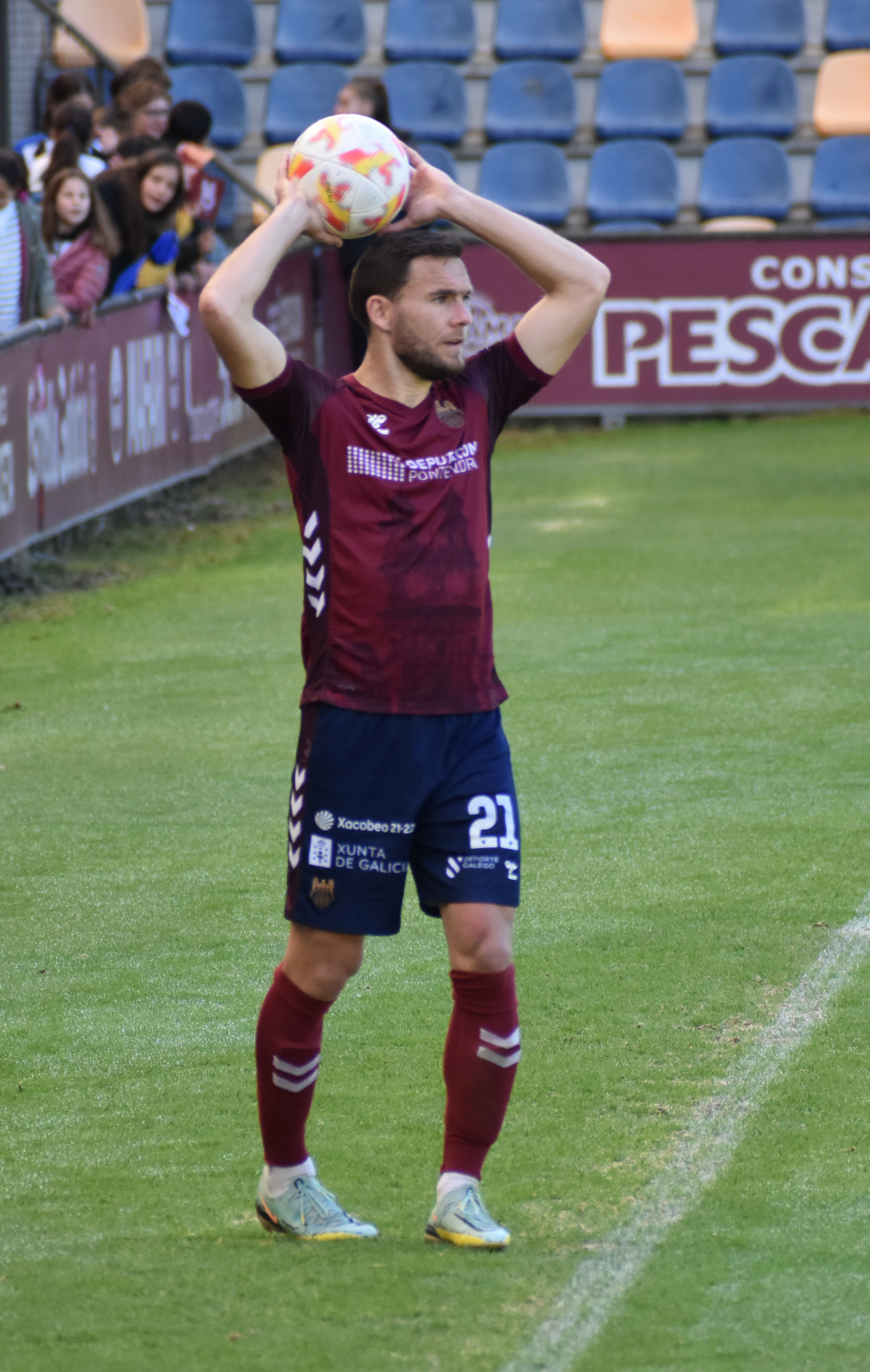
- Seoane with Pontevedra in 2023

Personal information
- Full name: Diego Seoane Pérez
- Date of birth: 26 April 1988 (age 38)
- Place of birth: Ourense, Spain
- Height: 1.81 m (5 ft 11 in)
- Position: Right-back

Youth career
- Pabellón
- 2003–2007: Deportivo La Coruña

Senior career*
Years	Team	Apps	(Gls)
2007–2011	Deportivo B	62	(4)
2007–2008	→ Ciudad Santiago (loan)	25	(0)
2010–2015	Deportivo La Coruña	42	(0)
2013	→ Córdoba (loan)	13	(0)
2015	→ Lugo (loan)	9	(0)
2015–2016	Ponferradina	17	(0)
2017	Dacia Chișinău	19	(1)
2018–2021	Racing Ferrol	98	(6)
2021–2023	Pontevedra	50	(2)
Total		335	(13)
- * Club domestic league appearances and goals

Diego Seoane Pérez (born 26 April 1988) is a Spanish former professional footballer who played as a right-back.

== Club career ==
Born in Ourense, Galicia, Seoane graduated from local Deportivo de La Coruña's youth academy, and made his senior debut while on loan to lowly SD Ciudad de Santiago in the 2007–08 season, in the Tercera División. In summer 2008 he returned to Dépor, being immediately assigned to the reserves of Segunda División B.

Seoane appeared in his first match as a professional on 27 January 2010, playing the full 90 minutes of a 1–0 away win against Sevilla FC in the quarter-finals of the Copa del Rey. He made his La Liga debut on 20 March, in a 0–2 home loss to Real Valladolid.

On 19 June 2010, Seoane signed a three-year professional contract with Deportivo. He continued to appear regularly for the B team, however.

Seoane agreed to an extension on 29 January 2013, and was immediately loaned to Segunda División side Córdoba CF. He started in 11 of his league appearances during his spell in Andalusia.

Having been the only member of the squad to not play in a competitive fixture during the campaign, Seoane was loaned to neighbouring CD Lugo of the second tier on 14 January 2015. He cut ties with the former club on 20 July, and moved to SD Ponferradina a day later.

== Personal life ==
Seoane's father, Paco, was also a footballer. He spent most of his career in the lower leagues.

== Career statistics ==
As of match played 9 May 2021

Appearances and goals by club, season and competition
Club	Season	League			National Cup		Continental		Other		Total	
Club	Season	Division	Apps	Goals	Apps	Goals	Apps	Goals	Apps	Goals	Apps	Goals
Deportivo B	2008–09	Segunda División B	30	1	—		—		—		30	1
Deportivo B	2009–10	Tercera División	14	2	—		—		—		14	2
Deportivo B	2010–11	Segunda División B	18	1	—		—		—		18	1
Deportivo B	Total		62	4	0	0	0	0	0	0	62	4
Ciudad Santiago (loan)	2007–08	Tercera División	25	0	—		—		—		25	0
Deportivo La Coruña	2008–09	La Liga	0	0	0	0	—		—		0	0
Deportivo La Coruña	2009–10	La Liga	1	0	1	0	—		—		2	0
Deportivo La Coruña	2010–11	La Liga	11	0	4	0	—		—		15	0
Deportivo La Coruña	2011–12	Segunda División	6	0	3	0	—		—		9	0
Deportivo La Coruña	2012–13	La Liga	0	0	0	0	—		—		0	0
Deportivo La Coruña	2013–14	Segunda División	24	0	2	1	—		—		26	1
Deportivo La Coruña	2014–15	La Liga	0	0	0	0	—		—		0	0
Deportivo La Coruña	Total		42	0	10	1	0	0	0	0	52	1
Córdoba (loan)	2012–13	Segunda División	13	0	0	0	—		—		13	0
Lugo (loan)	2014–15	Segunda División	9	0	0	0	—		—		9	0
Ponferradina	2015–16	Segunda División	17	0	3	0	—		—		20	0
Dacia Chișinău	2016–17	Moldovan National Division	11	1	1	0	—		—		12	1
Dacia Chișinău	2017	Moldovan National Division	8	0	0	0	2 (Note: Appearances in UEFA Europa League)	0	—		10	0
Dacia Chișinău	Total		19	1	1	0	2	0	0	0	22	1
Racing Ferrol	2017–18	Segunda División B	13	0	0	0	—		—		13	0
Racing Ferrol	2018–19	Tercera División	37	3	0	0	—		2 (Note: Appearances in Tercera División promotion playoffs)	0	39	3
Racing Ferrol	2019–20	Segunda División B	24	2	1	0	—		—		25	2
Racing Ferrol	2020–21	Segunda División B	24	1	0	0	—		—		24	1
Racing Ferrol	Total		98	6	1	0	0	0	2	0	101	6
Career total			285	11	15	1	2	0	2	0	304	12
