= Adrián López =

Spanish footballer (born 1988)

Adrián
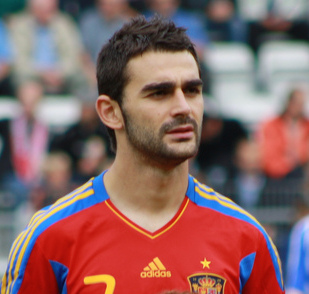
- Adrián before a game with Spain U21 in 2011

Personal information
- Full name: Adrián López Álvarez
- Date of birth: 8 January 1988 (age 38)
- Place of birth: Teverga, Spain
- Height: 1.83 m (6 ft 0 in)
- Position: Forward

Team information
- Current team: Villarreal (assistant)

Youth career
- Covadonga
- Oviedo

Senior career*
| Years | Team | Apps | (Gls) |
| 2005–2006 | Oviedo | 30 | (4) |
| 2006–2011 | Deportivo La Coruña | 92 | (13) |
| 2008 | → Alavés (loan) | 10 | (3) |
| 2008–2009 | → Málaga (loan) | 28 | (3) |
| 2011–2014 | Atlético Madrid | 90 | (11) |
| 2014–2019 | Porto | 25 | (1) |
| 2015–2016 | → Villarreal (loan) | 16 | (4) |
| 2017 | → Villarreal (loan) | 15 | (2) |
| 2017–2018 | → Deportivo La Coruña (loan) | 30 | (9) |
| 2019–2021 | Osasuna | 43 | (3) |
| 2022 | Málaga | 2 | (0) |
| Total | | 381 | (53) |

International career
| 2005 | Spain U17 | 1 | (0) |
| 2007 | Spain U19 | 3 | (3) |
| 2007 | Spain U20 | 5 | (5) |
| 2007–2011 | Spain U21 | 19 | (9) |
| 2012 | Spain Olympic (O.P.) | 5 | (0) |
| 2012 | Spain | 2 | (1) |

Managerial career
- 2024–2026: Rayo Vallecano (assistant)
- 2026–: Villarreal (assistant)
Medal record
Men's football
Representing Spain
UEFA European Under-21 Championship
| Winner | 2011 Denmark |
- * Club domestic league appearances and goals

Adrián López Álvarez (Spanish pronunciation: [aˈðɾjan ˈlopeθ]; born 8 January 1988), known simply as Adrián, is a Spanish former professional footballer who played as a forward. He is currently assistant manager at La Liga club Villarreal.

He amassed La Liga totals of 314 matches and 44 goals over 13 seasons, representing in the competition Deportivo, Málaga, Atlético Madrid, Villarreal and Osasuna and winning four major titles with the third club, including the 2013–14 league championship. In 2014 he signed with Porto from Portugal, being loaned several times during his contract.

Adrián earned two caps for Spain in 2012.

== Club career ==
=== Real Oviedo ===
Born in Teverga, Asturias, Adrián was a product of local Real Oviedo's youth system. He quickly made the transition into the first team, scoring three goals in 26 matches while playing in the Segunda División B. However, he did not have a professional contract because he was a youth player, and the only way to acquire his services for free was to offer him one.

=== Deportivo ===
Deportivo de La Coruña obliged and, in October 2006, Oviedo were given a €331,000 compensation by the La Liga club. Adrián's finest moment of 2006–07 arrived when, on 31 March 2007, he entered the league match at the Camp Nou in the 61st minute, and although FC Barcelona won it 2–1, he managed to score with a clever touch; it was his only league goal of the campaign, in 15 appearances (six starts).

After receiving few first team opportunities during 2007–08, Adrián was loaned to Segunda División strugglers Deportivo Alavés in April 2008. After helping the Basque team avoid relegation with three league goals, he returned to A Coruña to be loaned again on 14 August, this time to newly promoted Málaga CF on a season-long deal.

On 28 September 2008, Adrián netted his first goal for Málaga in a 2–1 home win over Real Valladolid, and appeared regularly throughout the campaign albeit only scoring three times. For 2009–10 he returned to Deportivo, where he began to feature prominently in the starting XI in various attacking positions. On 23 March 2010, he equalised for 10-men – eventually nine – Depor at Sporting de Gijón, in a final 2–1 loss.

Adrián continued to appear regularly in the 2010–11 season, again as a starter. In the Copa del Rey, the Galicians faced Córdoba CF in the round of 16: after a 1–1 draw in Andalusia, he scored the 1–1 in the 90th minute of the second leg, taking the match to extra time where he netted two more for a 3–1 victory and a spot in the quarter-finals. He finished as the team's top scorer at seven in 36 games, but they returned to the second tier after 20 years.

=== Atlético Madrid ===
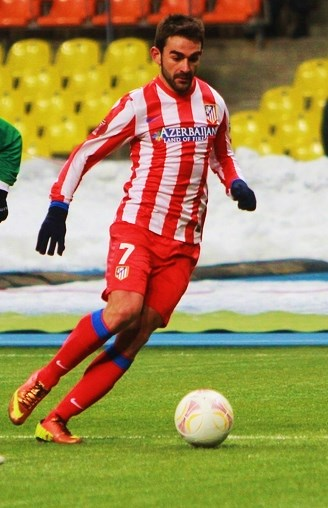
Adrián playing for Atlético in 2013

Adrián joined Atlético Madrid on 19 July 2011 as a free agent, signing a four-year deal. Nine days later, in his competitive debut, he assisted in both José Antonio Reyes goals in a 2–1 home win against Strømsgodset IF in that season's UEFA Europa League. In the second leg, he scored the opening goal in a 2–0 victory.

In the same competition, on 25 August 2011, Adrián added a brace in a 4–0 away defeat of Vitória de Guimarães which ensured Atlético's qualification for the group stage 6–0 on aggregate. His first league goal came in a 4–0 home win against Racing de Santander on 18 September, heading from an Arda Turan cross.

As the volatile Reyes became increasingly disgruntled with his reserve status at the club, Adrián firmly established himself in the starting eleven. In two games separated by only five days, he scored four goals, two apiece against Real Zaragoza in the league (3–1 home victory) and Udinese Calcio (4–0, also at home) in the Europa League; in the latter competition, as the team reached and won the final, he scored 11 times.

On 17 December 2013, Adrián extended his contract with the Colchoneros until 30 June 2018. On 30 April of the following year, he scored his third official goal of the season, starting and helping his team win 3–1 at Chelsea and progress to the final of the UEFA Champions League for the first time since 1974.

=== Porto ===
On 12 July 2014, Adrián signed a five-year deal with Portuguese club FC Porto, who paid €11 million to Atlético Madrid for 60% of his economic rights. He scored his first goal for his new team on 17 September, in a 6–0 rout of FC BATE Borisov in the Champions League group stage. It was his only goal in 18 competitive appearances over his first season.

Adrián returned to Spain and its top division on 31 August 2015, after agreeing to a one-year loan with Villarreal CF. After several months on the sidelines with a left leg tendon ailment, he scored his first goal the following 28 February, concluding a 3–0 home victory against Levante UD.

On 28 April 2016, Adrián scored the only goal at the Estadio El Madrigal against Liverpool, coming on for Roberto Soldado late into the second half and netting in the 90th minute of the first leg of the Europa League semi-finals. The following January, after few opportunities at Porto, he returned to Villarreal on the same basis for the remainder of the campaign.

On 11 August 2017, Adrián returned to Deportivo on a one-year loan deal. He scored a team and career-best nine goals, but the club was relegated from the top flight after four years.

On 19 October 2018, in a match against amateurs S.C. Vila Real in the third round of the Taça de Portugal, Adrián netted four times in a 6–0 away rout. He scored his first goal in the Primeira Liga the following 2 March, but in a 1–2 home loss to S.L. Benfica which leapfrogged the hosts to take first place with ten rounds remaining.

=== Osasuna ===
Adrián returned to Spain's top flight on 30 July 2019, with the free agent joining newly promoted CA Osasuna on a one-year contract. On 22 May 2021, after 46 competitive matches, he was released.

=== Málaga ===
On 31 March 2022, aged 34, Adrián returned to Málaga on a short-term deal. He retired in 2023 due to injury problems, even though he did not make any official announcement.

== International career ==
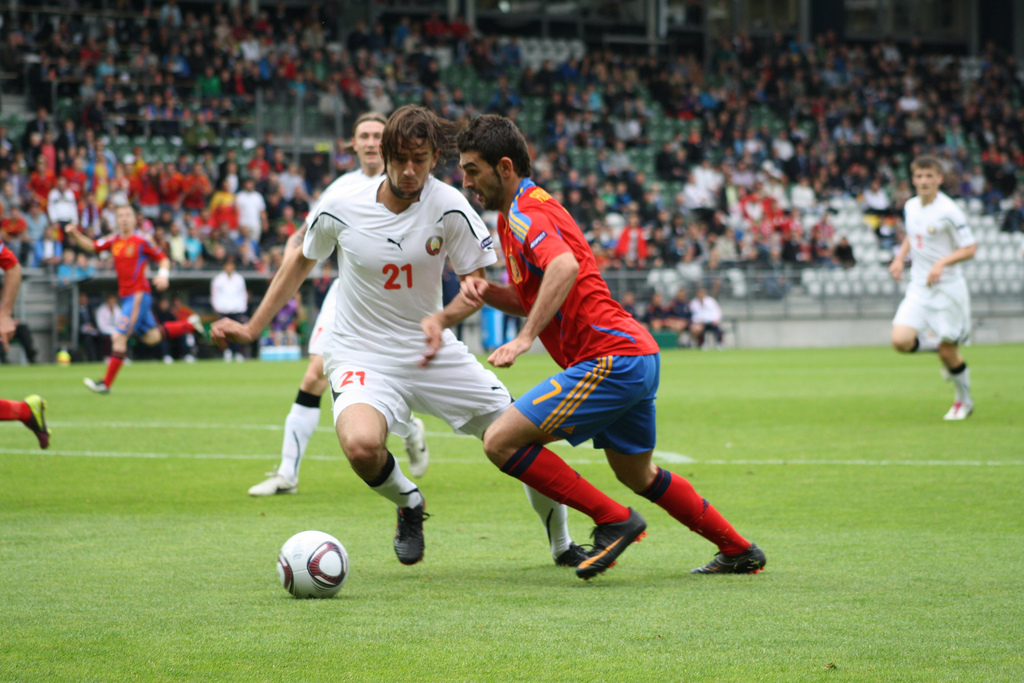
Adrián competing against Egor Filipenko in an under-21 match against Belarus in June 2011

In the 2007 FIFA U-20 World Cup held in Canada, Adrián scored a hat-trick for Spain in the final group stage game against Jordan on 7 July, with all three goals coming in a span of ten minutes late in the first half.

Subsequently, he represented the under-21s in two UEFA European Championships. In the 2011 edition in Denmark, Adrián scored a brace in a 2–0 group stage victory over the Czech Republic, adding another in the next match against Ukraine (3–0). In the semi-final against Belarus, he scored the late 1–1 which took the game into extra time, adding another in that period in an eventual 3–1 win; he was awarded the Golden Boot as the highest scorer in the tournament.

Adrián made his full side debut on 26 May 2012 in a friendly with Serbia: after replacing Soldado at half-time, he scored with a header in the 64th minute, and later won a penalty kick which resulted in the final 2–0 in St. Gallen. He was also part of the Olympic team in 2012.

== Coaching career ==
In February 2024, López was appointed assistant manager of Rayo Vallecano. Two years later, as head coach Iñigo Pérez signed with Villarreal, he joined him at his staff.

== Career statistics ==
=== Club ===
Appearances and goals by club, season and competition
| Club | Season | League | | | Cup | | Continental | | Other | | Total | | Ref. |
| Club | Season | Division | Apps | Goals | Apps | Goals | Apps | Goals | Apps | Goals | Apps | Goals | Ref. |
|---|---|---|---|---|---|---|---|---|---|---|---|---|---|
| Oviedo | 2004–05 | Tercera División | 4 | 1 | 0 | 0 | – | | – | | 4 | 1 | |
| Oviedo | 2005–06 | Segunda División B | 26 | 3 | 3 | 0 | – | | – | | 29 | 3 | |
| Oviedo | Total | | 30 | 4 | 3 | 0 | – | | – | | 33 | 4 | – |
| Deportivo La Coruña | 2006–07 | La Liga | 15 | 1 | 6 | 1 | – | | – | | 21 | 2 | |
| Deportivo La Coruña | 2007–08 | La Liga | 7 | 0 | 1 | 0 | – | | – | | 8 | 0 | |
| Deportivo La Coruña | 2008–09 | La Liga | 0 | 0 | 0 | 0 | 2 | 0 | – | | 2 | 0 | |
| Deportivo La Coruña | 2009–10 | La Liga | 34 | 4 | 5 | 0 | – | | – | | 39 | 4 | |
| Deportivo La Coruña | 2010–11 | La Liga | 36 | 7 | 4 | 4 | – | | – | | 40 | 11 | |
| Deportivo La Coruña | Total | | 92 | 12 | 16 | 5 | 2 | 0 | – | | 110 | 17 | – |
| Alavés (loan) | 2007–08 | Segunda División | 10 | 3 | 0 | 0 | – | | – | | 10 | 3 | |
| Málaga (loan) | 2008–09 | La Liga | 28 | 3 | 2 | 0 | – | | – | | 30 | 3 | |
| Atlético Madrid | 2011–12 | La Liga | 36 | 7 | 2 | 1 | 19 | 11 | – | | 57 | 19 | |
| Atlético Madrid | 2012–13 | La Liga | 32 | 3 | 6 | 1 | 9 | 0 | – | | 47 | 4 | |
| Atlético Madrid | 2013–14 | La Liga | 22 | 1 | 7 | 0 | 9 | 2 | 1 | 0 | 38 | 3 | |
| Atlético Madrid | Total | | 90 | 11 | 15 | 2 | 37 | 13 | 1 | 0 | 142 | 26 | – |
| Porto | 2014–15 | Primeira Liga | 9 | 0 | 4 | 0 | 5 | 1 | – | | 18 | 1 | |
| Porto | 2016–17 | Primeira Liga | 5 | 0 | 1 | 0 | 3 | 0 | – | | 9 | 0 | |
| Porto | 2018–19 | Primeira Liga | 11 | 1 | 8 | 4 | 4 | 1 | – | | 23 | 6 | |
| Porto | Total | | 25 | 1 | 13 | 4 | 12 | 2 | – | | 50 | 7 | – |
| Villarreal (loan) | 2015–16 | La Liga | 16 | 4 | 0 | 0 | 7 | 1 | – | | 23 | 5 | |
| Villarreal (loan) | 2016–17 | La Liga | 15 | 2 | 0 | 0 | 2 | 0 | – | | 17 | 2 | |
| Villarreal (loan) | Total | | 31 | 6 | 0 | 0 | 9 | 1 | – | | 40 | 7 | – |
| Deportivo La Coruña (loan) | 2017–18 | La Liga | 30 | 9 | 1 | 0 | – | | – | | 31 | 9 | |
| Osasuna | 2019–20 | La Liga | 26 | 2 | 3 | 0 | – | | – | | 29 | 2 | |
| Osasuna | 2020–21 | La Liga | 17 | 1 | 0 | 0 | – | | – | | 17 | 1 | |
| Osasuna | Total | | 43 | 3 | 3 | 0 | – | | – | | 46 | 3 | – |
| Málaga | 2021–22 | Segunda División | 2 | 0 | 0 | 0 | – | | – | | 2 | 0 | |
| Career total | | | 381 | 53 | 56 | 11 | 58 | 16 | 1 | 0 | 496 | 80 | – |

=== International ===
Spain score listed first, score column indicates score after each Adrián goal.

List of international goals scored by Adrián López
| No. | Date | Venue | Opponent | Score | Result | Competition | Ref. |
|---|---|---|---|---|---|---|---|
| 1. | 26 May 2012 | AFG Arena, St. Gallen, Switzerland | Serbia | 1–0 | 2–0 | Friendly | |

== Honours ==
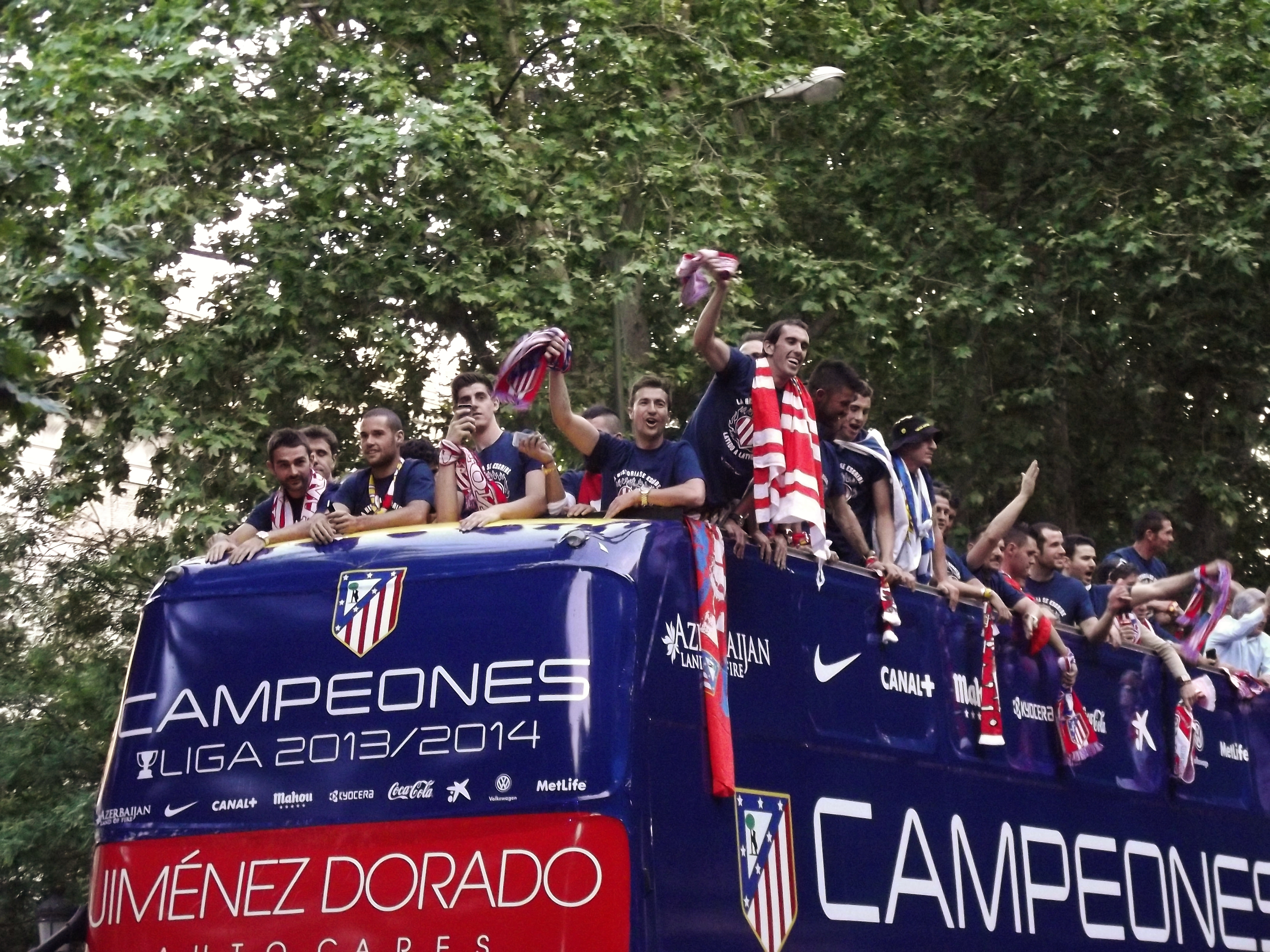
Adrián (farthest left) celebrating the 2013–14 La Liga with Atlético Madrid

Atlético Madrid

- La Liga: 2013–14
- Copa del Rey: 2012–13
- Supercopa de España runner-up: 2013
- UEFA Europa League: 2011–12
- UEFA Super Cup: 2012
- UEFA Champions League runner-up: 2013–14

Porto

- Supertaça Cândido de Oliveira: 2018

Spain U21

- UEFA European Under-21 Championship: 2011

Individual

- FIFA U-20 World Cup Silver Shoe: 2007
- UEFA European Under-21 Championship Golden Boot/Team of the Tournament: 2011
