= Manu Fernández (footballer, born 1986) =

Spanish footballer (born 1986)

Manu
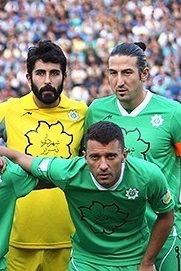
- Manu (left) with Machine Sazi in 2016

Personal information
- Full name: Manuel Fernández Muñiz
- Date of birth: 9 May 1986 (age 40)
- Place of birth: Gijón, Spain
- Height: 1.85 m (6 ft 1 in)
- Position: Goalkeeper

Youth career
- Sporting Gijón

Senior career*
Years	Team	Apps	(Gls)
2004–2006	Sporting Gijón B	26	(0)
2005–2007	Sporting Gijón	2	(0)
2007–2009	Deportivo B	42	(0)
2009–2011	Deportivo La Coruña	9	(0)
2011–2012	Recreativo	35	(0)
2012–2014	Alcorcón	41	(0)
2014–2015	Alavés	29	(0)
2015–2016	Deportivo La Coruña	8	(0)
2016–2017	Machine Sazi	16	(0)
2017	Marbella	7	(0)
Total		215	(0)

International career
2002	Spain U16	3	(0)
2002	Spain U17	1	(0)
2004	Spain U19	2	(0)
2005	Spain U20	1	(0)
- * Club domestic league appearances and goals

Manuel Fernández Muñiz (born 9 May 1986), commonly known as Manu, is a Spanish former professional footballer who played as a goalkeeper.

== Club career ==
Born in Gijón, Asturias, and a product of Mareo, Sporting de Gijón's youth academy, Manu made his professional debut during the 2005–06 season, with the club in the Segunda División. In 2007 he joined Deportivo de La Coruña, spending the better part of his first two years with the reserves.

In the 2009–10 campaign, after Gustavo Munúa's departure to Málaga CF, Manu was promoted to Dani Aranzubia's backup. On 23 March 2010, after the latter was sent off against precisely Sporting Gijón (Depor eventually finished with nine players) at the 10-minute mark, he made his La Liga debut, in a 2–1 away loss.

Due to injury to Aranzubia, Manu started 2010–11's first six games then returned to the bench, appearing in the Copa del Rey as Deportivo were eventually relegated after 20 years. In July he signed with another team in the second division, Recreativo de Huelva, and continued competing at that level the following years, in representation of AD Alcorcón and Deportivo Alavés.

Manu returned to the Estadio Riazor for the 2015–16 season, arriving following injury to habitual starter Fabri. Again, he played second-fiddle, now to Germán Lux.

In the summer of 2016, Manu signed with Iranian club Machine Sazi FC, newly promoted to the Persian Gulf Pro League, on a one-year contract. He returned to Spain halfway through the campaign, joining Marbella FC from Segunda División B.

== Career statistics ==
Appearances and goals by club, season and competition
Club	Season	League			Cup		Europe		Other		Total	
Club	Season	Division	Apps	Goals	Apps	Goals	Apps	Goals	Apps	Goals	Apps	Goals
Sporting Gijón	2005–06	Segunda División	2	0	0	0	—		—		2	0
Sporting Gijón	2006–07	Segunda División	0	0	0	0	—		—		0	0
Sporting Gijón	Total		2	0	0	0	—		—		2	0
Deportivo B	2007–08	Segunda División B	12	0	—		—		—		12	0
Deportivo B	2008–09	Segunda División B	30	0	—		—		2	0	32	0
Deportivo B	Total		42	0	—		—		2	0	44	0
Deportivo La Coruña	2007–08	La Liga	0	0	0	0	—		—		0	0
Deportivo La Coruña	2008–09	La Liga	—		—		0	0	—		9	0
Deportivo La Coruña	2009–10	La Liga	3	0	6	0	—		—		9	0
Deportivo La Coruña	2010–11	La Liga	6	0	6	0	—		—		12	0
Deportivo La Coruña	Total		9	0	12	0	—		—		21	0
Recreativo	2011–12	Segunda División	35	0	0	0	—		—		35	0
Alcorcón	2012–13	Segunda División	41	0	0	0	—		2	0	43	0
Alcorcón	2013–14	Segunda División	0	0	1	0	—		—		1	0
Alcorcón	Total		41	0	1	0	—		2	0	44	0
Alavés	2014–15	Segunda División	29	0	0	0	—		—		29	0
Deportivo La Coruña	2015–16	La Liga	8	0	4	0	—		—		12	0
Machine Sazi	2016–17	Persian Gulf Pro League	16	0	1	0	—		—		17	0
Marbella	2016–17	Segunda División B	7	0	—		—		—		7	0
Career total			189	0	18	0	0	0	4	0	211	0

== Honours ==
Spain U19

- UEFA European Under-19 Championship: 2004
