= Saúl Fernández =

Spanish footballer

Saúl
Personal information
- Full name: Saúl Fernández García
- Date of birth: 9 April 1985 (age 41)
- Place of birth: Oviedo, Spain
- Height: 1.76 m (5 ft 9 in)
- Position: Midfielder

Youth career
- Treviense
- Sporting Gijón

Senior career*
| Years | Team | Apps | (Gls) |
| 2003–2005 | Sporting Gijón B | 53 | (4) |
| 2005–2006 | Málaga B | 31 | (2) |
| 2006 | Málaga | 15 | (0) |
| 2007–2008 | Levante B | 27 | (1) |
| 2007–2008 | Levante | 20 | (0) |
| 2008–2010 | Elche | 66 | (11) |
| 2010–2013 | Deportivo La Coruña | 29 | (0) |
| 2013–2014 | Ponferradina | 14 | (1) |
| Total | | 255 | (19) |

International career
| 2004 | Spain U19 | 2 | (0) |
- * Club domestic league appearances and goals

Saúl Fernández García (born 9 April 1985), known simply as Saúl, is a Spanish former professional footballer. A midfielder, he was comfortable on both sides of the pitch.

He amassed Segunda División totals of 140 games and 14 goals over six seasons, representing five clubs. He appeared in 35 matches in La Liga a 11-year senior career, with Málaga, Levante and Deportivo de La Coruña.

== Club career ==
Saúl was born in Oviedo, Asturias. After finishing his development at Sporting de Gijón he made his professional debut in the 2005–06 season with Málaga CF's B team, then in the Segunda División. In May 2006, as the main squad's fate was already decided for the worst, he made his first two La Liga appearances, against neighbours Sevilla FC (2–0 home loss) and Cádiz CF (5–0 away defeat); incidentally, the reserves were also relegated.

Saúl then joined Levante UD for 2007–08, in another troubled campaign with the club submersed in deep financial problems and eventually dropping down to the second division. He had his breakthrough season in the following year as he scored eight league goals for Valencian Community neighbours Elche CF, having signed a two-year deal with the second-tier side the previous summer.

Subsequently, Saúl did not have his contract renewed. On 7 July 2010, he moved to Deportivo de La Coruña on a three-year deal; during his spell at the Estadio Riazor, he could hardly get a game due to injury problems.

Saúl returned to the second division in February 2013, rejoining his former Elche manager Claudio Barragán at SD Ponferradina. On 22 April 2014, the 29-year-old announcement his retirement after not being able to overcome an ankle injury.

== Honours ==
Deportivo La Coruña

- Segunda División: 2011–12
