= Yves Desmarets =

Haitian footballer (born 1979)

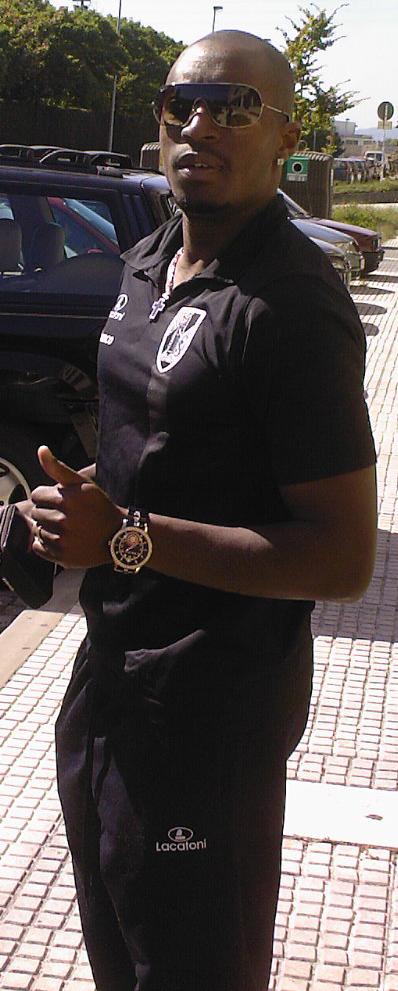
- Desmarets as a Guimarães player in 2009

Personal information
- Full name: Yves Hadley Desmarets
- Date of birth: 19 July 1979 (age 47)
- Place of birth: Paris, France
- Height: 1.78 m (5 ft 10 in)
- Position: Midfielder

Senior career*
Years	Team	Apps	(Gls)
1998–1999	Villiers-le-Bel		
1999–2000	Sarcelles		
2000–2001	Garges-lès-Gonesse		
2001–2002	Saint-Denis		
2002–2003	Les Lilas		
2003–2004	Red Star		
2004–2005	AS Poissy		
2005–2006	Red Star		
2006–2010	Vitória Guimarães	107	(10)
2010–2011	Deportivo La Coruña	12	(0)
2011–2012	Kerkyra	0	(0)
2012–2013	Belenenses	28	(8)
2014–2016	PTT Rayong	56	(20)
2014–2016	Felgueiras 1932	4	(0)

International career
2013	Haiti	6	(0)
- * Club domestic league appearances and goals

Yves Hadley Desmarets (born 19 July 1979) is a Haitian former professional footballer who played as a left midfielder.

He spent the vast majority of his professional career, which started at the age of 27, in Portugal, representing Vitória de Guimarães and Belenenses and amassing Primeira Liga totals of 86 games and eight goals over the course of three seasons, all with the former.

== Club career ==
Prior to his arrival in Portugal to sign with Vitória de Guimarães for the 2006–07 season (with the club in the second division, finally winning promotion), Paris-born Desmarets played the vast majority of his career in modest French clubs, never appearing in higher than the third level. He quickly became an undisputed starter, contributing with four goals in all 30 Primeira Liga games as the Minho team overachieved for a final third place in his second year, ahead of Benfica.

In June 2010, after only missing four league matches combined in two top level campaigns, adding four goals, 30-year-old Desmarets signed as a free agent for one year with Deportivo de La Coruña in Spain, with an option for another one. He only appeared in 12 La Liga games during the season – 693 minutes of action – which finished in relegation.

After a failed trial with Montreal Impact, Desmarets joined Kerkyra in Greece for 2011–12, appearing in no official matches. In early July 2012, he signed for Belenenses on a free transfer.

== International career ==
Desmarets began appearing for Haiti at the age of nearly 34. His debut occurred on 8 June 2013 in Miami, as he played 85 minutes in a 2–1 loss against Spain.
