= David Añón =

Spanish footballer (born 1989)

Personal information
- Full name: David Añón González
- Date of birth: 3 April 1989 (age 37)
- Place of birth: A Coruña, Spain
- Height: 1.72 m (5 ft 8 in)
- Position: Forward

Team information
- Current team: Coruxo
- Number: 10

Youth career
- 2007–2008: Deportivo La Coruña

Senior career*
Years	Team	Apps	(Gls)
2008–2011	Deportivo B	63	(13)
2008–2009	→ Montañeros (loan)	32	(8)
2010–2011	Deportivo La Coruña	3	(0)
2011–2012	Albacete	23	(1)
2012–2014	Celta B	64	(14)
2014–2015	Boiro	33	(9)
2015–2016	Somozas	36	(10)
2016–2018	Pontevedra	70	(15)
2018–2019	Katowice	24	(2)
2019–2020	Coruxo	27	(5)
2020–2022	Talavera	57	(7)
2022–	Coruxo	109	(14)
- * Club domestic league appearances and goals as of 7 May 2026

David Añón González (born 3 April 1989) is a Spanish professional footballer who plays as a forward for Coruxo.

== Club career ==
Añón was born in A Coruña, Galicia. A product of Deportivo de La Coruña's youth system, he made his official debut with the first team on 20 January 2010, in a 0–3 home loss against Sevilla FC in the quarter-finals of the Copa del Rey. On 28 February he first appeared in La Liga, playing four minutes – and being booked – in a 1–0 defeat at Villarreal CF.

After leaving Dépor, Añón represented Albacete Balompié, Celta de Vigo B, CD Boiro, UD Somozas, Pontevedra CF, Coruxo FC and CF Talavera de la Reina, all in the lower leagues and mostly in his native region. He also spent one year in the Polish I liga with GKS Katowice.
