= Iván Pérez (footballer, born 1985) =

Spanish footballer

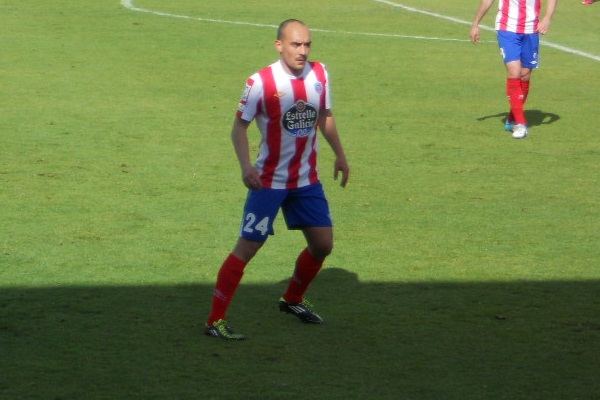

Personal information
- Full name: Iván Santiago Pérez Maceira
- Date of birth: 16 November 1985 (age 40)
- Place of birth: Compostela, Spain
- Height: 1.71 m (5 ft 7 in)
- Position: Midfielder

Team information
- Current team: Alondras

Youth career
- Laracha

Senior career*
Years	Team	Apps	(Gls)
2005–2006	Laracha	?	(21)
2006–2009	Deportivo B	81	(25)
2009–2011	Deportivo La Coruña	20	(0)
2010–2011	→ Ponferradina (loan)	15	(0)
2011–2012	Montañeros	23	(2)
2012–2014	Lugo	49	(3)
2015	Compostela	12	(1)
2015–2016	Panegialios	8	(0)
2016	Talavera	10	(0)
2016–2017	Somozas	32	(1)
2017–	Alondras	95	(3)
- * Club domestic league appearances and goals as of 8 March 2020

Iván Santiago Pérez Maceira (born 16 November 1985) is a Spanish footballer who plays for Alondras CF as an attacking midfielder.

== Club career ==
Pérez was born in Santiago de Compostela, Galicia. After finishing his football formation with Deportivo de La Coruña he made his debut for the first team on 29 August 2009, coming on as a substitute for Juan Carlos Valerón for the final 20 minutes against Real Madrid, in a 2–3 La Liga away loss.

On 23 July 2010, Pérez was loaned to SD Ponferradina, freshly returned to Segunda División. Released by Depor at the end of the season due to several injury problems, he continued playing in his native region, representing Montañeros CF, CD Lugo and SD Compostela. He scored his first goal as a professional on 11 May 2013 while at the service of the second club, but in a 3–5 home defeat to UD Almería.

Subsequently, after a brief spell in the Greek second level with Panegialios FC, Pérez returned to Spain and continued to compete mainly in the Galician lower leagues, representing CF Talavera de la Reina, UD Somozas and Alondras CF.

== Club statistics ==
As of 30 September 2015

Club	Season	League			Cup		Continental		Total	
Club	Season	Division	Apps	Goals	Apps	Goals	Apps	Goals	Apps	Goals
Deportivo	2006–07	La Liga	0	0	1	0	—		1	0
Deportivo	2009–10	La Liga	20	0	6	0	—		26	0
Deportivo	Total		20	0	7	0	—		27	0
Ponferradina (loan)	2010–11	Segunda División	15	0	2	1	—		17	1
Montañeros	2011–12	Segunda División B	23	2	0	0	—		23	2
Lugo	2012–13	Segunda División	18	2	0	0	—		18	2
Lugo	2013–14	Segunda División	31	1	0	0	—		31	1
Lugo	Total		49	3	0	0	—		49	3
Compostela	2014–15	Segunda División B	12	1	0	0	—		12	1
Panegialios	2015–16	Football League	1	0	0	0	—		1	0
Career total			120	6	9	1	0	0	129	7
