= Juan Rodríguez (footballer, born 1982) =

Spanish footballer

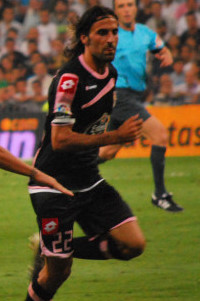
- Rodríguez in action for Deportivo in 2009

Personal information
- Full name: Juan Antonio Rodríguez Villamuela
- Date of birth: 1 April 1982 (age 44)
- Place of birth: Málaga, Spain
- Height: 1.85 m (6 ft 1 in)
- Position: Defensive midfielder

Youth career
- Málaga

Senior career*
Years	Team	Apps	(Gls)
2000–2003	Málaga B	111	(16)
2003–2006	Málaga	58	(6)
2006–2011	Deportivo La Coruña	160	(11)
2011–2016	Getafe	107	(3)
2016–2017	Mallorca	19	(1)
Total		455	(37)
- * Club domestic league appearances and goals

Juan Antonio Rodríguez Villamuela (born 1 April 1982) is a Spanish former professional footballer who played as a defensive midfielder.

During 13 seasons, he played 325 matches in La Liga in representation of Málaga, Deportivo and Getafe, for which he scored a combined 20 goals.

== Football career ==
Born in Málaga, Andalusia, and grown through the ranks of Málaga CF, Rodríguez first played with the first team early into 2003–04, coming on as a 57th-minute substitute in a 2–1 away win against RCD Espanyol on 28 September 2003, ultimately appearing twice in that season and been mainly registered with the reserves. He established himself in the former the next year, becoming an undisputed starter subsequently and scoring five league goals in his first full campaign.

With Málaga relegated from La Liga in 2006, Rodríguez joined Deportivo de La Coruña after having been linked with the Galicians in the previous months, signing on 13 July 2006 in a deal which earned the player approximately €600.000 per season, a relatively lower amount compared to players previously operating in the same position at the club: Roberto Acuña, Aldo Duscher and Lionel Scaloni.

Rodríguez was regularly played as starter during his spell with Deportivo, in various midfield positions (103 league games and six goals in his last three years combined). In late June 2011, after the side's top flight relegation, the 29-year-old signed as a free agent for Getafe CF, penning a four-year contract.

On 4 July 2016, following Getafe's top division relegation, Rodríguez joined RCD Mallorca from Segunda División. Roughly one year later, after meeting the same fate, he announced his retirement at the age of 35.
