= Adrián López (footballer, born 1987) =

Spanish footballer (born 1987)

Personal information
- Full name: Adrián López Rodríguez
- Date of birth: 25 February 1987 (age 39)
- Place of birth: As Pontes, Spain
- Height: 1.84 m (6 ft 0 in)
- Position: Centre-back

Youth career
- As Pontes
- 2001–2006: Deportivo La Coruña

Senior career*
Years	Team	Apps	(Gls)
2006–2008	Deportivo B	12	(0)
2007–2010	Deportivo La Coruña	26	(1)
2011–2013	Wigan Athletic	11	(0)
2013–2015	Montreal Impact	0	(0)
2015–2016	Aarhus	5	(0)
2017–2018	Fredericia	16	(0)
2018–2019	Compostela	30	(2)
Total		100	(3)
- * Club domestic league appearances and goals

Adrián López Rodríguez (born 25 February 1987), also known as Piscu, is a Spanish former professional footballer who played as a central defender.

== Club career ==
=== Deportivo ===
López was born in As Pontes de García Rodríguez, A Coruña. After emerging through the ranks of local Deportivo de La Coruña, he spent his first two senior seasons with their reserves. During 2007–08, he benefitted from injury to starter Alberto Lopo and made 15 La Liga starts for the first team, the first coming on 30 September 2007 in a 1–0 away loss against RCD Espanyol.

On 22 February 2009, again starting and already a full member of the main squad, Piscu scored his only goal for the Galicians, in a 1–1 home draw with Valencia CF. He finished the campaign with eight league appearances.

=== Wigan Athletic ===
In the summer of 2010, Deportivo unilaterally renewed Piscu's contract, keeping him at the club until June 2011. The player, not having signed the contract himself, believed he was a free agent and did not turn up for training; while waiting for the dispute to be resolved by FIFA, he trained with Premier League side Wigan Athletic, and the entity eventually ruled that he was a free player and was allowed to join another team.

On 31 December 2010, Piscu eventually joined the Latics on a free transfer, signing a deal until the end of 2010–11. He made his debut in the third round of the FA Cup, starting in a 3–2 win at Hull City on 8 January 2011. He first appeared in the league on 5 March, in a 1–0 away defeat to Manchester City.

López made a total of four appearances in his first year and, in early August 2011, extended his contract at the DW Stadium for a further two years. He left at the end of the 2012–13 season as the team suffered relegation, with only 19 competitive matches to his credit.

=== Montreal Impact ===
On 26 July 2013, López signed with Major League Soccer club Montreal Impact for an undisclosed fee. He made his competitive debut on 21 August in a CONCACAF Champions League match against C.D. Heredia, which ended in a 1–0 loss and with him being sent off for a challenge on Charles Córdoba. Additionally, he failed to appear in the league season after suffering a torn anterior cruciate ligament to his right knee during a training session.

=== Later career ===
López spent the 2015–16 campaign in the Danish Superliga, appearing rarely for Aarhus Gymnastikforening and being released in early May 2016. The following year, he stayed in the country but moved down to the 1st Division, signing with FC Fredericia.

== Honours ==
Wigan Athletic

- FA Cup: 2012–13
