= Antonio Tomás =

Spanish footballer

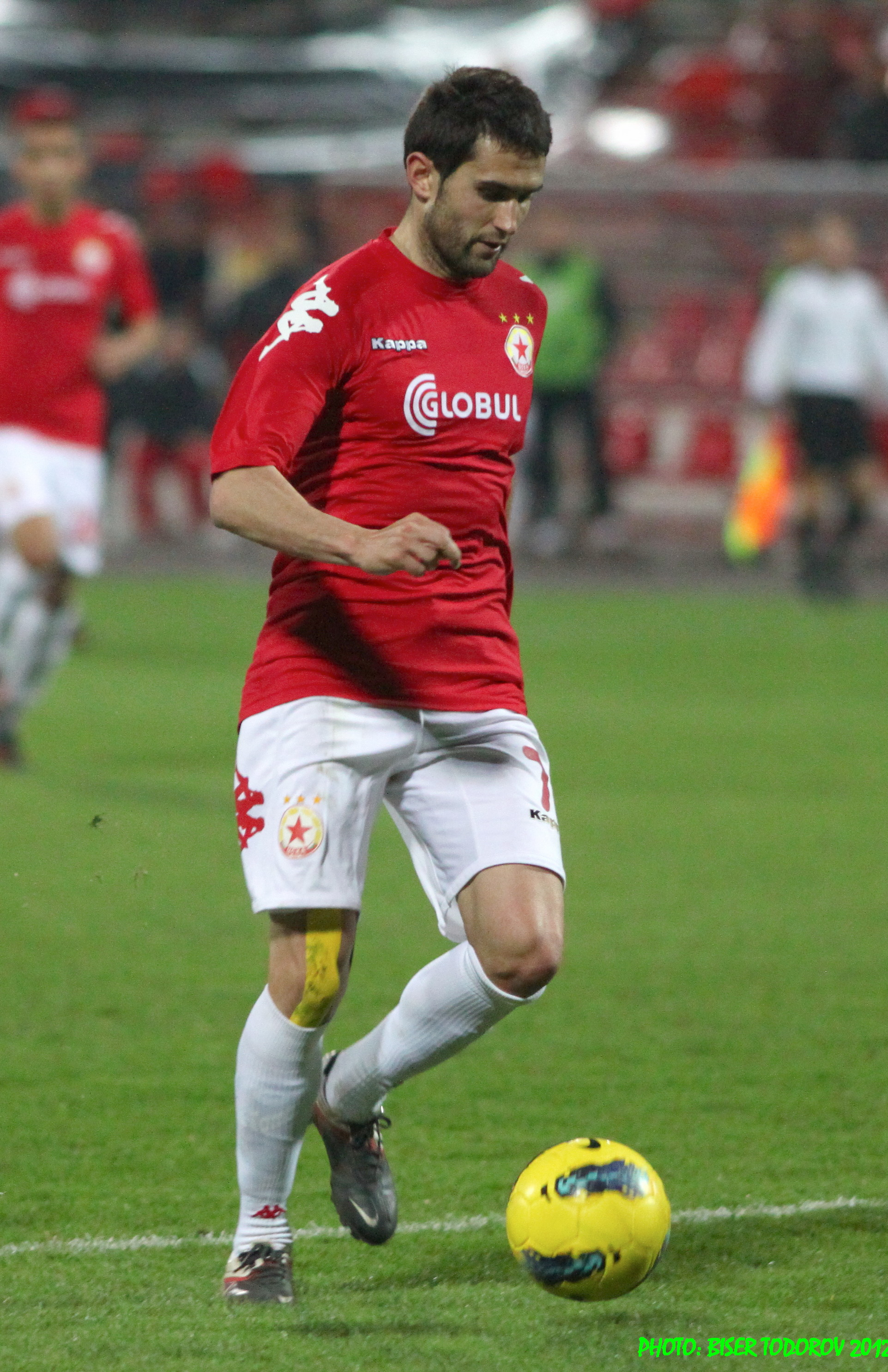
- Tomás playing for CSKA Sofia

Personal information
- Full name: Antonio Tomás González
- Date of birth: 19 January 1985 (age 41)
- Place of birth: Torrelavega, Spain
- Height: 1.77 m (5 ft 10 in)
- Position: Defensive midfielder

Youth career
- Racing Santander

Senior career*
Years	Team	Apps	(Gls)
2003–2005	Racing B	75	(6)
2005–2006	Racing Santander	23	(0)
2006–2011	Deportivo La Coruña	75	(0)
2006–2007	→ Racing Santander (loan)	20	(0)
2011–2012	Zaragoza	3	(0)
2012	CSKA Sofia	10	(0)
2012–2016	Numancia	79	(3)
2016–2017	Veria	15	(0)
2017–2018	Racing Santander	23	(1)
Total		323	(10)
- * Club domestic league appearances and goals

Antonio Tomás González (born 19 January 1985) is a Spanish former professional footballer who played as a defensive midfielder.

== Club career ==
Tomás was born in Torrelavega, Cantabria. He came through the youth ranks at local giants Racing de Santander, making his La Liga debut on 30 October 2005 by starting in a 1–1 away draw against Valencia CF and finishing the season with 23 games.

In 2006, Tomás was signed by Deportivo de La Coruña and immediately loaned to his former team for one year, returning for the 2007–08 campaign and playing sparingly as Depor finished ninth. From 2009 to 2011 he was regularly used by manager Miguel Ángel Lotina – only three of his 51 league appearances were not starts– but the Galicians were relegated in the second season and he was subsequently released.

On 27 September 2011, Tomás joined Real Zaragoza on a one-year contract. On 20 February of the following year, however, he severed his ties with the Aragonese and signed for 16 months with Bulgarian club PFC CSKA Sofia.

Tomás returned to his country for 2012–13, going on to spend four Segunda División campaigns with CD Numancia. On 17 July 2016, he agreed to a one-year deal at Super League Greece side Veria F.C. for an undisclosed fee.

Tomás returned to the Campos de Sport de El Sardinero in summer 2017, with Racing now in the Segunda División B.

== Career statistics ==
As of 31 December 2015

Club	Season	League		Cup		Continental		Total	
Club	Season	Apps	Goals	Apps	Goals	Apps	Goals	Apps	Goals
Racing Santander	2005–06	23	0	0	0	—		23	0
Racing Santander	2006–07	20	0	0	0	—		20	0
Racing Santander	Total	43	0	0	0	0	0	43	0
Deportivo	2007–08	12	0	0	0	—		13	0
Deportivo	2008–09	12	0	0	0	7	0	19	0
Deportivo	2009–10	30	0	0	0	—		30	0
Deportivo	2010–11	21	0	2	0	—		23	0
Deportivo	Total	75	0	2	0	7	0	84	0
Zaragoza	2011–12	3	0	2	0	—		5	0
Zaragoza	Total	3	0	2	0	0	0	5	0
CSKA Sofia	2011–12	10	0	0	0	—		10	0
CSKA Sofia	Total	10	0	0	0	0	0	10	0
Numancia	2012–13	24	1	0	0	—		24	1
Numancia	2013–14	26	2	0	0	—		26	2
Numancia	2014–15	26	0	1	0	—		27	0
Numancia	2015–16	3	0	0	0	—		3	0
Numancia	Total	79	3	1	0	0	0	80	3
Career total		204	3	5	0	7	0	216	3
