= Laure (footballer) =

Spanish footballer (born 1985)

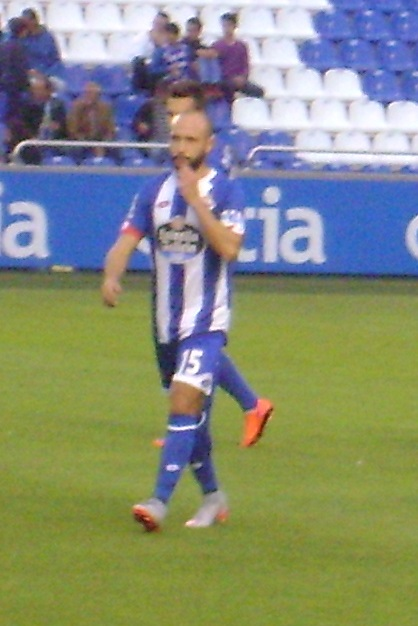

Personal information
- Full name: Laureano Sanabria Ruiz
- Date of birth: 22 March 1985 (age 41)
- Place of birth: Madrid, Spain
- Height: 1.66 m (5 ft 5 in)
- Position: Right-back

Youth career
- 2002–2005: Real Madrid

Senior career*
Years	Team	Apps	(Gls)
2005–2006	Real Madrid C	34	(0)
2006–2007	Leganés	32	(0)
2007–2008	Deportivo B	25	(0)
2007–2017	Deportivo La Coruña	191	(2)
2017–2022	Alcorcón	172	(1)
2022–2023	Atlético Baleares	35	(0)
Total		489	(3)
- * Club domestic league appearances and goals

Laureano Sanabria Ruiz (born 22 March 1985), commonly known as Laure, is a Spanish former professional footballer who played as a right-back.

He spent the vast majority of his career with Deportivo La Coruña, where he made 213 appearances in all competitions over ten seasons. In La Liga, he appeared in 117 matches for the club.

== Club career ==
=== Real Madrid and Leganés ===
Born in Madrid, Laure was a Real Madrid youth graduate whom, despite an impressive season for its C side, did not see Ramón Calderón's board offer him a new contract. He then signed for CD Leganés, also in the Spanish capital and competing in the Segunda División B, where he was a regular during his only season.

=== Deportivo ===
After moving to Deportivo de La Coruña in the summer of 2007, Laure quickly went on to establish himself as starter in its reserves, eventually catching the eye of first-team manager Miguel Ángel Lotina who picked him to replace the injured Manuel Pablo against Villarreal CF on 13 January 2008, and he played the full 90 minutes in the 4–3 La Liga away loss. At the end of the campaign, he earned a new deal to stay at the club until 2011.

Laure appeared in 20 matches in 2009–10, mostly as a left-back due to Filipe Luís' terrible ankle injury; Deportivo stood fourth in the table at the moment (January 2010), eventually finishing in tenth position. He scored his only goal in the top flight on 29 January 2011, in a 3–3 home draw with Sevilla FC.

In 2011–12, his first season ever in Segunda División, Laure took part in 38 games for the champions, scoring in the 3–2 home win over Girona FC. He managed another promotion from that level two years later, contributing 36 appearances and one goal.

=== Alcorcón ===
On 5 July 2017, Laure signed a three-year contract with AD Alcorcón of the second tier. In September of the following year, he reached the milestone of 50 consecutive complete matches.

== Honours ==
Deportivo

- Segunda División: 2011–12
