= 2014–15 Córdoba CF season =

Córdoba CF
2014–15 season
- President: Carlos González
- Head coach: Albert Ferrer (until 20 October); Miroslav Đukić (from 20 October); José Antonio Romero (interim, from 16 March)
- Stadium: Nuevo Arcángel
- La Liga: 20th (relegated)
- Copa del Rey: Round of 32
- Top goalscorer: League: Nabil Ghilas (7); All: Nabil Ghilas (7)
Home colours	Away colours	Third colours

The 2014–15 season Córdoba CF season was the club's 60th season in its history and ninth participating in La Liga, the top-flight of Spanish football.

== Squad ==
As of 1 September 2014

Note: Flags indicate national team as defined under FIFA eligibility rules; some limited exceptions apply. Players may hold more than one non-FIFA nationality.

No.	Pos.	Nation	Player
1	GK	ESP	Juan Carlos
2	DF	SRB	Aleksandar Pantić (on loan from Villarreal)
3	DF	ESP	José Ángel Crespo (on loan from Bologna)
4	DF	ESP	Iago Bouzón
5	MF	CMR	Patrick Ekeng
6	MF	ESP	Luso
7	MF	ITA	Fausto Rossi (on loan from Juventus)
9	FW	ESP	Xisco
10	MF	ARG	Fede Cartabia (on loan from Valencia)
11	MF	ESP	José Carlos
12	DF	ESP	Íñigo López
13	GK	ESP	Mikel Saizar
14	FW	ALG	Nabil Ghilas (on loan from Porto)

No.	Pos.	Nation	Player
15	DF	ESP	Deivid
16	MF	ESP	Fidel (on loan from Elche)
17	DF	URU	Adrián Gunino (on loan from Fénix)
18	MF	ESP	Borja García (on loan from Real Madrid)
19	MF	ESP	López Silva
20	FW	BRA	Ryder Matos (on loan from Fiorentina)
21	MF	ESP	Carlos Caballero
22	MF	ESP	Aritz López Garai
23	MF	ESP	Abel (captain)
24	FW	JPN	Mike Havenaar
29	DF	ESP	Daniel Pinillos
33	DF	ESP	Eduard Campabadal
35	MF	ESP	Fede Vico (on loan from Anderlecht)

=== Out on loan ===
Note: Flags indicate national team as defined under FIFA eligibility rules; some limited exceptions apply. Players may hold more than one non-FIFA nationality.

No.	Pos.	Nation	Player
—	DF	ESP	Fran Cruz (to Alcorcón)
—	DF	ESP	Bernardo (to Racing Santander)
—	DF	ESP	Samu de los Reyes (to Lugo)

No.	Pos.	Nation	Player
—	MF	ESP	Adri Cuevas (to Hércules)
—	FW	ESP	Arturo (to Alcorcón)

As 2014..

== Statistics ==
=== Appearances and goals ===
Updated as of 30 May 2015.

No.	Pos	Nat	Player	Total		La Liga		Copa del Rey	
No.	Pos	Nat	Player	Apps	Goals	Apps	Goals	Apps	Goals
1	GK	(Spain) ESP	Juan Carlos	32	0	32	0	-	-
2	DF	(Serbia) SRB	Aleksandar Pantić	29	0	27+2	0	-	-
3	DF	(Spain) ESP	José Ángel Crespo	27	0	26+1	0	-	-
4	DF	(Spain) ESP	Iago Bouzón	3	0	3	0	-	-
5	MF	(Cameroon) CMR	Patrick Ekeng	14	1	8+6	1	-	-
6	MF	(Spain) ESP	Luso	18	1	16+2	1	-	-
7	MF	(Italy) ITA	Fausto Rossi	24	0	16+8	0	-	-
9	MF	(Cape Verde) CPV	Héldon	14	0	6+8	0	-	-
10	MF	(Argentina) ARG	Fede Cartabia	30	4	24+6	4	-	-
11	DF	(Brazil) BRA	Edimar	17	0	17	0	-	-
12	DF	(Spain) ESP	Íñigo López	21	0	21	0	-	-
13	GK	(Spain) ESP	Mikel Saizar	6	0	6	0	-	-
14	FW	(Algeria) ALG	Nabil Ghilas	27	7	23+4	7	-	-
15	DF	(Spain) ESP	Deivid	21	0	21	0	-	-
16	MF	(Spain) ESP	Fidel	25	1	17+8	1	-	-
17	DF	(Uruguay) URU	Adrián Gunino	23	0	21+2	0	-	-
18	MF	(Spain) ESP	Borja García	28	1	22+6	1	-	-
19	MF	(Spain) ESP	López Silva	8	0	4+4	0	-	-
20	MF	(Argentina) ARG	Bruno Zuculini	8	0	5+3	0	-	-
21	MF	(Slovenia) SLO	Rene Krhin	14	0	14	0	-	-
23	MF	(Spain) ESP	Abel	22	0	14+8	0	-	-
24	FW	(Portugal) POR	Bebé	18	0	16+2	0	-	-
28	FW	(Romania) ROU	Florin Andone	20	5	17+3	5	-	-
29	DF	(Spain) ESP	Daniel Pinillos	12	0	9+3	0	-	-
33	DF	(Spain) ESP	Edu Campabadal	14	0	12+2	0	-	-
35	MF	(Spain) ESP	Fede Vico	20	0	8+12	0	-	-
36	MF	(Democratic Republic of the Congo) COD	Jonathan Bijimine	1	0	0+1	0	-	-
38	DF	(Spain) ESP	Fran Serrano	2	0	1+1	0	-	-
40	FW	(Spain) ESP	Sergio García	1	0	0+1	0	-	-
Players who have made an appearance or had a squad number this season but have been loaned out or transferred
9	FW	(Spain) ESP	Xisco	9	1	1+8	1	-	-
11	MF	(Spain) ESP	José Carlos	1	0	0+1	0	-	-
20	FW	(Brazil) BRA	Ryder Matos	3	0	2+1	0	-	-
21	MF	(Spain) ESP	Carlos Caballero	2	0	0+2	0	-	-
22	MF	(Spain) ESP	Aritz López Garai	6	0	5+1	0	-	-
24	FW	(Japan) JPN	Mike Havenaar	5	0	4+1	0	-	-

== Competitions ==
=== Overall ===
Competition	Started round	Final position / round	First match	Last match
La Liga	—		August 2014	May 2015
Copa del Rey	Round of 32		December 2014	

Updated to match played June 2014
Source: Competitions

=== La Liga ===
==== Legend ====
Win Draw Lose Postponed

==== Results by round ====
Round	1	2	3	4	5	6	7	8	9	10	11	12	13	14	15	16	17	18	19	20	21	22	23	24	25	26	27	28	29	30	31	32	33	34	35	36	37	38
Ground	A	H	A	H	A	H	A	H	H	A	H	A	H	A	H	A	H	A	H	H	A	H	A	A	A	H	A	A	H	A	H	A	H	A	H	A	H	A
Result	L	D	D	L	L	D	D	L	D	L	D	D	L	W	D	L	W	W	D	L	L	L	L	L	L	L	L	L	L	D	L	D	L	L	L	L	L	L
Position	19	18	18	19	20	20	18	20	18	20	20	20	20	18	18	19	18	14	14	16	18	20	20	20	20	20	20	20	20	20	20	20	20	20	20	20	20	20

A = Away; H = Home; W = Win; D = Draw; L = Loss

==== Matches ====
Kickoff times are in CEST and CET.

25 August 2014 1	Real Madrid	2–0	Córdoba	Madrid
20:00 CEST	Benzema 30', (yellow card) 72'; Ronaldo 90'	Report	Pinillos (yellow card) 18'; López Garai (yellow card) 59'	Stadium: Santiago Bernabéu; Attendance: 70,356; Referee: Jesús Gil Manzano

30 August 2014 2	Córdoba	1–1	Celta Vigo	Córdoba
19:00 CEST	Cartabia 60'; Ekeng (yellow card) 75'	Report	Jonny (yellow card) 22'; Cabral (yellow card) 40'; Radoja (yellow card) 50'; Orellana 52'; Fernández (yellow card) 81'	Stadium: Nuevo Arcángel; Attendance: 15,982; Referee: José Teixeira Vitienes

12 September 2014 3	Almería	1–1	Córdoba	Almería
21:00	Édgar 11', (yellow card) 82'; Soriano (yellow card) 43'; Silva (yellow card) 47'; Thomas (yellow card) 55'	Report	Cartabia 19', (yellow card) 86'; Deivid (yellow card) 40'; Pantić (yellow card) 69'; Rossi (yellow card) 83'	Stadium: Juegos Mediterráneos; Attendance: 10,682; Referee: Fernando Teixeira Vitienes

21 September 2014 4	Córdoba	1–3	Sevilla	Córdoba
19:00	Í. López (yellow card) 14'; Rossi (yellow card) 20'; Gunino (yellow card) 31'; Havenaar (yellow card) 47'; Borja 83'; Cartabia (yellow card) 84'; Pantić (yellow card) 87'	Report	Bacca 8', 88' (pen.); Coke (yellow card) 21'; Mbia 72'; Vidal (yellow card) 74'	Stadium: Nuevo Arcángel; Attendance: 17,023; Referee: Carlos Velasco Carballo

25 September 2014 5	Valencia	3–0	Córdoba	Valencia
22:00	Alcácer 22'; Gayà 26'; Fuego (yellow card) 36'; Feghouli 73'	Report	Bouzón (yellow card) 31'; Crespo (yellow card) 60'; Fidel (yellow card) 90'	Stadium: Mestalla; Attendance: – Referee: Iñaki Vicandi Garrido

28 September 2014 6	Córdoba	0–0	Espanyol	Córdoba
21:00	Crespo (yellow card) 25'; Ekeng (yellow card) 55'	Report	Cañas (yellow card) 12'; Fuentes (yellow card) 36'; Álvaro (yellow card) 68'; Vázquez (yellow card) 81'; Mattioni (yellow card) 86'; Sánchez (yellow card) 89'	Stadium: Nuevo Arcángel; Attendance: 24,000; Referee: Santiago Jaime Latre

3 October 7	Getafe	1–1	Córdoba	Getafe
21:00	Sarabia (yellow card) 87'; Diawara 88'	Report	Ekeng (yellow card) 30', (goal) 78'; Vico (yellow card) 56'	Stadium: Coliseum Alfonso Perez; Attendance: 9,000; Referee: Juan Martínez Munuera

18 October 2014 8	Córdoba	1–2	Málaga	Córdoba
22:00	Juan Carlos (yellow card) 30'; Luso (yellow card) 60'; Ghilas 90'	Report	Samu 22'; Amrabat 31' (pen.); Castillejo (yellow card) 41'; Recio (yellow card) 73'; Sánchez (yellow card) 90'	Stadium: Nuevo Arcángel; Attendance: 17,000; Referee: José González González

25 October 2014 9	Córdoba	1–1	Real Sociedad	Córdoba
22:00 CEST	Pinillos (yellow card) 80'; Ghilas (yellow card) 83'; Campabadal (yellow card) 86'; Xisco 87'	Report	I. Martínez 22'; Vela (yellow card) 56'; Granero (yellow card) 83'	Stadium: Nuevo Arcángel; Attendance: 15,712; Referee: Carlos del Cerro Grande

1 November 2014 10	Atlético Madrid	4–2	Córdoba	Madrid
18:00 CET	Griezmann 43', 58'; Mandžukić 62'; García 80'	Report	Bouzón (yellow card) 37'; Ghilas 53', 87'; Cartabia (yellow card) 61'	Stadium: Vicente Calderón; Attendance: 48,600; Referee: Carlos Clos Gómez

7 November 2014 11	Córdoba	0–0	Deportivo La Coruña	Córdoba
20:45 CET	Luso (yellow card) 18'; Í. López (yellow card) 29'; Pinillos (yellow card) 43'; Pantić (yellow card) 59'	Report	Postiga (yellow card) 16' (yellow-red card) 29'	Stadium: Estadio Nuevo Arcángel; Attendance: 15,643; Referee: Antonio Mateu Lahoz

23 November 2014 12	Elche	2–2	Córdoba	Elche
19:00 CET	Roco (yellow card) 57'; Lombán 63' (pen.), (yellow card) 64'; Jonathas 75'; Suárez (yellow card) 82'	Report	Pantić (yellow card) 5'; Fidel 12'; Cartabia 60', (yellow card) 66'; Pinillos (yellow card) 63'; Í. López (yellow card) 90+2'	Stadium: Manuel Martínez Valero; Attendance: 22,639; Referee: Alejandro Hernández Hernández

30 November 2014 13	Córdoba	0–2	Villarreal	Córdoba
19:00 CET	Deivid (yellow card) 47'; Í. López (yellow card) 49'; Cartabia (yellow card) 70'	Report	Vietto 24', (yellow card) 47'; Cheryshev (yellow card) 51'; Uche 70'	Stadium: Nuevo Arcángel; Attendance: 15,998; Referee: Javier Estrada Fernández

6 December 2014 14	Athletic Bilbao	0–1	Córdoba	Bilbao
18:00 CET	Iturraspe (yellow card) 52'; Laporte (yellow card) 82'; Iraizoz (yellow card) 84'; Muniain (yellow card) 90+4'	Report	Ghilas 23'; Luso (yellow card) 75'; Campabadal (yellow card) 81'; García (yellow card) 84'; Pinillos (yellow card) 88'; Silva (yellow card) 90+1'; Juan Carlos (yellow card) 90+4'	Stadium: San Mamés; Attendance: 38,500; Referee: Santiago Jaime Latre

13 December 2014 15	Córdoba	0–0	Levante	Córdoba
20:00 CET		Report	I. López (yellow card) 33'; Karabelas (yellow card) 63'; Simão Mate (yellow card) 90+3'	Stadium: Nuevo Arcángel; Attendance: 14,000; Referee: Eduardo Prieto Iglesias

20 December 2014 16	Barcelona	5–0	Córdoba	Barcelona
16:00 CET	Pedro 2'; Suárez 53'; Busquets (yellow card) 66'; Piqué 80'; Messi 82', 90+1'	Report		Stadium: Camp Nou; Attendance: 60,066; Referee: Antonio Mateu Lahoz

5 January 2015 17	Córdoba	2–0	Granada	Córdoba
20:45 CET	Ghilas 16'; Cartabia (yellow card) 20'; Andone 44'; Campabadal (yellow card) 90+1'	Report		Stadium: Nuevo Arcángel; Attendance: 18,600; Referee: Iñaki Vicandi Garrido

12 January 2015 18	Rayo Vallecano	0–1	Córdoba	Madrid
20:45 CET	Ba (yellow card) 27'; Tito (yellow card) 53'; Trashorras (yellow card) 70'	Report	Bebé (yellow card) 7'; Ba 39' (o.g.); Campabadal (yellow card) 58'	Stadium: Campo de Vallecas; Attendance: 10,620; Referee: Javier Estrada Fernández

16 January 2015 19	Córdoba	1–1	Eibar	Córdoba
20:45 CET	Andone 1'; Campabadal (yellow card) 32' (yellow-red card) 56'; Deivid (yellow card) 38'; Edimar (yellow card) 48'; Juan Carlos (yellow card) 56'; Crespo (yellow card) 61'	Report	Navas (yellow card) 30'; Ekiza (yellow card) 41'; Piovaccari (red card) 58'; Arruabarrena 73'; Lara (yellow card) 85'	Stadium: Nuevo Arcángel; Attendance: 14,800; Referee: Fernando Teixeira Vitienes

24 January 2015 20	Córdoba	1–2	Real Madrid	Córdoba
16:00 CET	Ghilas 3' (pen.); Rossi (yellow card) 58'; Cartabia (yellow card) 60' (yellow-red card) 87'	Report	Ramos (yellow card) 2'; Benzema 27'; Khedira (yellow card) 63'; Carvajal (yellow card) 74'; Ronaldo (red card) 82'; Bale 89' (pen.)	Stadium: Nuevo Arcángel; Attendance: 21,822; Referee: Alejandro Hernández Hernández

31 January 2015 21	Celta Vigo	1–0	Córdoba	Vigo
22:00 CET	Orellana (yellow card) 29'; Mina (yellow card) 41'; Nolito 56'	Report	Héldon (yellow card) 42'; Bebé (yellow card) 51'; Rossi (yellow card) 84'; Abel (yellow card) 84'; Bouzón (yellow card) 85'; Crespo (yellow card) 90+6'	Stadium: Balaídos; Attendance: 16,200; Referee: José Teixeira Vitienes

8 February 2015 22	Córdoba	1–2	Almería	Córdoba
12:00 CET	Cartabia 10'; Rossi (yellow card) 17'; Bebé (yellow card) 37'	Report	Dubarbier (yellow card) 36'; Bifouma (yellow card) 57'; Michel 61', 66'; Silva (yellow card) 72'; Soriano (yellow card) 74'; Trujillo (yellow card) 87'	Stadium: Nuevo Arcángel; Attendance: 18,000; Referee: Juan Martínez Munuera

14 February 2015 23	Sevilla	3–0	Córdoba	Seville
16:00 CET	Krychowiak 38', (red card) 73'; Bacca 44'; Iborra 76'	Report	Ekeng (red card) 54'; Krhin (yellow card) 74'	Stadium: Ramón Sánchez Pizjuán; Attendance: 29,450; Referee: Iñaki Vicandi Garrido

21 February 2015 24	Córdoba	1–2	Valencia	Córdoba
18:00 CET	Héldon (yellow card) 50'; Ghilas 74' (pen.)	Report	Gomes 38'; Gayà (yellow card) 48'; Rodrigo (yellow card) 57'; Piatti 81'	Stadium: Nuevo Arcángel; Attendance: 18,000; Referee: Alberto Undiano Mallenco

27 February 2015 25	Espanyol	1–0	Córdoba	Cornellà de Llobregat
20:45 CET	Moreno (yellow card) 12'; Fuentes (yellow card) 19'; Abraham 43'; Cañas (yellow card) 60'; Sánchez (yellow card) 84'; García (yellow card) 87'	Report	Pantić (yellow card) 55'; Zuculini (yellow card) 66'; Andone (yellow card) 76'; García (yellow card) 87'	Stadium: Cornellà-El Prat; Attendance: 16,000; Referee: Carlos del Cerro Grande

9 March 2015 26	Córdoba	1–2	Getafe	Córdoba
20:45 CET	Cartabia (yellow card) 20'; Andone (yellow card) 74', (goal) 77'; Í. López (yellow card) 85'	Report	Alexis (yellow card) 62'; Naldo (yellow card) 85'; Vico 87' (o.g.); Rodríguez 90+2'	Stadium: Nuevo Arcángel; Attendance: 15,181; Referee: Alfonso Álvarez Izquierdo

15 March 2015 27	Málaga	2–0	Córdoba	Málaga
17:00 CET	Juanmi 48'; Amrabat 84'	Report	Andone (yellow card) 83'; Bebé (yellow card) 86'	Stadium: La Rosaleda; Attendance: 24,547; Referee: José González González

22 March 2015 28	Real Sociedad	3–1	Córdoba	San Sebastián
19:00 CET	Ansotegi (yellow card) 10'; Agirretxe 33'; Castro 75'; Finnbogason 90+2'	Report	Pantić (red card) 6'; Andone 12'; Héldon (yellow card) 35'; Zuculini (yellow card) 45+3'; Juan Carlos (yellow card) 64'; Bebé (yellow card) 71'; Í. López (yellow card) 76' (yellow-red card) 81'; Krhin (yellow card) 89'; Cartabia (yellow card) 90+3'; Pinillos (red card) 90+3'	Stadium: Anoeta; Attendance: 21,169; Referee: Carlos Velasco Carballo

4 April 2015 29	Córdoba	0–2	Atlético Madrid	Córdoba
18:00 CEST	Andone (yellow card) 45+1'; Gunino (yellow card) 59'	Report	Griezmann 5'; Saúl 39'; Juanfran (yellow card) 80'	Stadium: Nuevo Arcángel; Attendance: 15,000; Referee: Javier Estrada Fernández

8 April 2015 30	Deportivo La Coruña	1–1	Córdoba	A Coruña
20:00 CEST	Luisinho (yellow card) 17' (yellow-red card) 69'; Borges (yellow card) 47'; Juanfran (yellow card) 73'; Medunjanin (yellow card) 74'; Andone 87' (o.g.)	Report	Krhin (yellow card) 24'; Andone 55'; Cartabia (yellow card) 73'; Crespo (yellow card) 90+2'	Stadium: Riazor; Attendance: 17,602; Referee: Eduardo Prieto Iglesias

12 April 2015 31	Córdoba	0–2	Elche	Córdoba
21:00 CEST	García (red card) 81'	Report	Albácar 41'; Lombán (yellow card) 62'; Pašalić 68'; Rodríguez (yellow card) 81'	Stadium: Nuevo Arcángel; Attendance: 14,164; Referee: Iñaki Vicandi Garrido

19 April 2015 32	Villarreal	0–0	Córdoba	Villarreal
19:00 CEST	Bailly (yellow card) 90'	Report	Crespo (yellow card) 18'; Abel (yellow card) 86'; Héldon (yellow card) 87'; Gunino (yellow card) 90'	Stadium: El Madrigal; Attendance: 14,092; Referee: Ignacio Iglesias Villanueva

24 April 2015 33	Córdoba	0–1	Athletic Bilbao	Córdoba
20:45 CEST	Andone (yellow card) 57'; Vico (yellow card) 82'	Report	Williams (yellow card) 3'; Etxeita (yellow card) 47'; Deivid 56' (o.g.); San José (yellow card) 85'	Stadium: Nuevo Arcángel; Attendance: 16,472; Referee: José Teixeira Vitienes

28 April 2015 34	Levante	1–0	Córdoba	Valencia
22:00 CEST	Barral 41'; Víctor (yellow card) 46'; José Mari (yellow card) 79'; Karabelas (yellow card) 90'	Report	Deivid (yellow card) 28'; Í. López (yellow card) 87'; Gunino (yellow card) 89'	Stadium: Ciutat de València; Attendance: 14,098; Referee: Jesús Gil Manzano

2 May 2015 35	Córdoba	0–8	Barcelona	Córdoba
16:00 CEST	Luso (yellow card) 52'	Report	Rakitic 19'; Suárez 45+2', 53', 88'; Messi 46', 60'; Neymar 64' (pen.); Piqué 65'	Stadium: Nuevo Arcángel; Attendance: 13,775; Referee: Carlos Clos Gómez

9 May 2015 36	Granada	2–0	Córdoba	Granada
16:00 CEST	El-Arabi (yellow card) 26', (goal) 69' (pen.); Mainz 45'; Pérez (yellow card) 58'	Report	Í. López (yellow card) 12' (yellow-red card) 30'; Cartabia (yellow card) 50' (yellow-red card) 79'; Krhin (yellow card) 65'; Pantić (yellow card) 69'	Stadium: Nuevo Arcángel; Attendance: 19,266; Referee: Fernando Teixeira Vitienes

17 May 2015 37	Córdoba	1–2	Rayo Vallecano	Córdoba
19:00 CEST	Luso 57'	Report	Baena 21'; Embarba 78'	Stadium: Nuevo Arcángel; Attendance: 7,619; Referee: Antonio Mateu Lahoz

23 May 2015 38	Eibar	3–0	Córdoba	Eibar
18:30 CEST	Arruabarrena 6'; Navas 11'; Capa (yellow card) 26', (goal) 34'	Report		Stadium: Ipurua; Attendance: 6,065; Referee: Alfonso Álvarez Izquierdo

==== League table ====
Pos	Team	Pld	W	D	L	GF	GA	GD	Pts	Qualification or relegation
16	Deportivo La Coruña	38	7	14	17	35	60	−25	35 (Note: Head-to-head record: Deportivo 7 pts, Granada 6 pts, Eibar 2 pts)	
17	Granada	38	7	14	17	29	64	−35	35	
18	Eibar	38	9	8	21	34	55	−21	35	
19	Almería (Note: Almería was docked 3 points due to an unpayment of a transfer.) (R)	38	8	8	22	35	64	−29	29	Relegation to Segunda División
20	Córdoba (R)	38	3	11	24	22	68	−46	20	Relegation to Segunda División

Source: La Liga
Rules for classification: 1) points; 2) head-to-head points; 3) head-to-head goal difference; 4) goal difference; 5) number of goals scored; 6) fair-play points; 7) playoff match
(R) Relegated

=== Copa del Rey ===
==== Round of 32 ====
3 December 2014 First leg	Granada	1–0	Córdoba	Granada
22:00	Córdoba 25'	Report		Stadium: Los Cármenes; Attendance: 9,066; Referee: Fernando Teixeira Vitienes

17 December 2014 Second leg	Córdoba	1–1 (1–2 agg.)	Granada	Córdoba
22:00	Andone 5'	Report	Mainz 60'	Stadium: Nuevo Arcángel; Attendance: 6,000; Referee: Alfonso Álvarez Izquierdo
