= 2022–23 UAE Pro League =

UAE Pro League
- Season: 2022–23
- Dates: 2 September – 13 May
- Champions: Shabab Al Ahli (8th title)
- Relegated: Al Dhafra; Dibba Al Fujairah
- 2023–24 AFC Champions League: Al Ain; Shabab Al Ahli; Sharjah
- Matches: 137
- Goals: 414 (3.02 per match)
- Top goalscorer: Kodjo Laba (28 goals)
- Biggest home win: Al Ain 7–0 Al Dhafra (10 September 2022)
- Biggest away win: Al Bataeh 0–6 Shabab Al Ahli (4 November 2022)
- Highest scoring: Kalba 5–3 Al Nasr (29 October 2022)
- Longest winning run: Al Ain; Al Wahda (7 games)
- Longest unbeaten run: Shabab Al Ahli (13 games)
- Longest winless run: Al Dhafra (11 games)
- Longest losing run: Al Dhafra (11 games)
- All statistics correct as of 14 May 2023.

The 2022–23 UAE Pro League was the 48th edition of the UAE Pro League. Al Ain were the defending champions after winning their fourteenth title last season. There was a mid-season break due to the 2022 FIFA World Cup in Qatar.

Shabab Al Ahli won the Pro League for the eighth time.

== Teams ==
=== Team changes ===
==== Promoted to the Pro League ====
Dibba Al Fujairah would get promoted back after winning the First Division league by beating Al Arabi 2–1, they would return after being absent for three seasons. Al Bataeh would secure promotion on the last day after beating Al Hamriyah 4–2, this will be their first ever season on the top flight in the clubs history.

==== Relegated to the First Division ====
Emirates would get relegated back to the First Division after a 0–1 home defeat to Al Urooba on the 17th of May. Al Urooba would also get relegated after losing to Al Dhafra 2–1 on the final matchday.

=== Stadia and locations ===
Locations of teams in the 2022–23 UAE Pro League

Note: Table lists clubs in alphabetical order.

| Team | Home city | Stadium | Capacity |
|---|---|---|---|
| Ajman | Ajman | Ajman Stadium | 5,537 |
| Al Ain | Al-Ain | Hazza Bin Zayed Stadium | 25,965 |
| Al Bataeh | Al Bataeh | Al Bataeh Stadium | 2,000 |
| Al Dhafra | Madinat Zayed | Al Dhafra Stadium | 5,020 |
| Al Jazira | Abu Dhabi (Al Nahyan) | Mohammad Bin Zayed Stadium | 42,056 |
| Al Nasr | Dubai (Al Nasr) | Al-Maktoum Stadium | 15,058 |
| Al Wahda | Abu Dhabi (Al Nahyan) | Al Nahyan Stadium | 12,201 |
| Al Wasl | Dubai (Zabeel) | Zabeel Stadium | 8,439 |
| Baniyas | Abu Dhabi (Al Shamkha) | Baniyas Stadium | 10,000 |
| Dibba Al Fujairah | Dibba Al-Fujairah | New Dibba Stadium | 9,500 |
| Kalba | Kalba | Ittihad Kalba Stadium | 8,500 |
| Khor Fakkan | Khor Fakkan | SBM Al Qassimi Stadium | 7,500 |
| Shabab Al Ahli | Dubai (Deira) | Al-Rashid Stadium | 12,052 |
| Sharjah | Sharjah | Sharjah Stadium | 20,000 |

== Personnel and kits ==
Note: Flags indicate national team as has been defined under FIFA eligibility rules. Players may hold more than one non-FIFA nationality.

| Team | Head Coach | Captain | Kit Manufacturer | Shirt Sponsor |
|---|---|---|---|---|
| Ajman | (Serbia) Goran Tufegdžić | (United Arab Emirates) Ali Al-Hosani | Adidas | Ajman Bank |
| Al Ain | (Ukraine) Serhiy Rebrov | (United Arab Emirates) Bandar Al-Ahbabi | Nike | First Abu Dhabi Bank |
| Al Bataeh | (Morocco) Said Chkhit | (United Arab Emirates) Khamis Esmaeel | Nike | N/A |
| Al Dhafra | (Serbia) Aleksandar Veselinović | (United Arab Emirates) Ahmed Ali | Kelme | ADNOC |
| Al Jazira | (Netherlands) Marcel Keizer | (United Arab Emirates) Ali Khasif | Zat Outfit | Healthpoint |
| Al Nasr | (Croatia) Goran Tomić | (United Arab Emirates) Tareq Ahmed | N45 | Emirates Islamic |
| Al Wahda | (Netherlands) Arno Buitenweg | (United Arab Emirates) Mohammed Barqesh | Adidas | N/A |
| Al Wasl | (Spain) Juan Antonio Pizzi | (United Arab Emirates) Ali Salmeen | Macron | Dubai Real Estate Centre |
| Baniyas | (Romania) Daniel Isăilă | (United Arab Emirates) Fawaz Awana | Macron | ADIB |
| Dibba Al Fujairah | (United Arab Emirates) Hassan Al Abdouli | (United Arab Emirates) Mohamed Al Rowaihy | uhlsport | Fujairah Investment |
| Kalba | (Iran) Farhad Majidi | (United Arab Emirates) Mansor Abbas | Errea | Caltex |
| Khor Fakkan | (United Arab Emirates) Abdulaziz Al Yassi | (United Arab Emirates) Saif Mohammed | Adidas | N/A |
| Shabab Al Ahli | (Portugal) Leonardo Jardim | (United Arab Emirates) Majed Naser | Nike | Nissan; Dubai Integrated Economic Zones |
| Sharjah | (Romania) Cosmin Olăroiu | (United Arab Emirates) Shahin Abdulrahman | Adidas | SAIF Zone; University Hospital Sharjah |

=== Foreign players ===
- Players name in **bold** indicates the player is registered during the mid-season transfer window.
- Players in italics were out of the squad or left the club within the season, after the pre-season transfer window, or in the mid-season transfer window, and at least had one appearance.

| Club | Player 1 | Player 2 | Player 3 | Player 4 | Player 5 | Former players |
|---|---|---|---|---|---|---|
| Ajman | (Slovenia) Miral Samardžić | (Tunisia) Firas Ben Larbi | (Morocco) Walid Azaro | (Bahrain) Ali Madan | (Republic of the Congo) Prestige Mboungou | |
| Al Ain | (Togo) Kodjo Fo-Doh Laba | (Morocco) Soufiane Rahimi | (Ukraine) Andriy Yarmolenko | (Morocco) El Mehdi El Moubarik | (Croatia) **Tin Jedvaj** | (Colombia) Danilo Arboleda |
| Al Bataeh | (Cameroon) Anatole Abang | (Brazil) Lourency | (Portugal) Artur Jorge | (Portugal) João Novais | (Ghana) **Kwame Bonsu** | (South Africa) Thibang Phete |
| Al Dhafra | (Netherlands) Mohamed Rayhi | (Brazil) Cláudio | (Tunisia) Walid Karoui | (Brazil) **Tiago Leonço** | (Bulgaria) **Georgi Milanov** | (Suriname) Mitchell te Vrede (Brazil) Lucas Cândido |
| Al Jazira | (Serbia) **Miloš Kosanović** | (South Africa) Thulani Serero | (Romania) Florin Tănase | (Morocco) Achraf Bencharki | (Iraq) **Aymen Hussein** | (Czech Republic) Filip Novák (Mali) Abdoulay Diaby |
| Al Nasr | (Portugal) Tozé | (Cape Verde) Ryan Mendes | (Morocco) Adel Taarabt | (Bosnia and Herzegovina) **Samir Memišević** | (Togo) **Peniel Mlapa** | (Brazil) Jája Silva (The Gambia) Dembo Darboe (Brazil) Lucão |
| Al Wahda | (Brazil) João Pedro | (Portugal) Adrien Silva | (Brazil) Allan | (Brazil) **Matheus Pereira** | | (Portugal) Fábio Martins (Brazil) Maracás (Portugal) Pizzi (Egypt) Ahmed Refaat |
| Al Wasl | (Algeria) **Djamel Benlamri** | (Morocco) Soufiane Bouftini | (Argentina) Gerónimo Poblete | (Argentina) Tomás Chancalay | (Chile) **Felipe Gutiérrez** | (Brazil) Gilberto (Brazil) Gabrielzinho |
| Baniyas | (Serbia) Saša Ivković | (Argentina) Gastón Álvarez Suárez | (Argentina) Nicolás Giménez | (Brazil) Rafael Elias | (Senegal) Opa Nguette | |
| Dibba Al Fujairah | (Brazil) Marcelo | (Brazil) Jája Silva | (Brazil) **Edu** | (Brazil) **Pedro Castro** | (Brazil) **China** | (Netherlands) Joey Sleegers (Montenegro) Aleksandar Šćekić (Mali) Saliou Guindo (Botswana) Kabelo Seakanyeng |
| Kalba | (Slovakia) Filip Kiss | (Italy) Daniel Bessa | (Brazil) Igor Rossi | (Romania) Alexandru Cicâldău | (Mali) **Abdoulay Diaby** | (Togo) Peniel Mlapa |
| Khor Fakkan | (Brazil) **Dodô** | (Portugal) Aylton Boa Morte | (Serbia) Lazar Rosić | (Angola) **Fábio Abreu** | (Algeria) Mehdi Abeid | (Brazil) Ramon Lopes (Greece) Panagiotis Tachtsidis |
| Shabab Al Ahli | (Argentina) Federico Cartabia | (Uzbekistan) Azizjon Ganiev | (Iran) Ahmad Nourollahi | (Ba'athist Syria) Omar Khribin | (Belgium) Jason Denayer | |
| Sharjah | (Brazil) Caio | (Spain) Paco Alcácer | (Bosnia and Herzegovina) Miralem Pjanić | (Greece) Kostas Manolas | (Cape Verde) **Djaniny** | (Senegal) Makhete Diop |

=== Managerial changes ===
| Team | Outgoing manager | Date of vacancy | Manner of departure | Pos. | Incoming manager | Date of appointment |
|---|---|---|---|---|---|---|
| Al Nasr | (United Arab Emirates) Salem Rabie | 19 May 2022 | Caretaker tenure ended | Pre-season | (Germany) Thorsten Fink | 19 May 2022 |
| Al Wahda | (France) Grégory Dufrennes | 19 May 2022 | Caretaker tenure ended | Pre-season | (Portugal) Carlos Carvalhal | 1 July 2022 |
| Kalba | (Uruguay) Jorge da Silva | 26 May 2022 | End of contract | Pre-season | (Iran) Farhad Majidi | 8 June 2022 |
| Khor Fakkan | (Argentina) Gabriel Calderón | 26 May 2022 | End of contract | Pre-season | (United Arab Emirates) Abdulaziz Al Yassi | 14 June 2022 |
| Shabab Al Ahli | (United Arab Emirates) Mahdi Ali | 26 May 2022 | End of contract | Pre-season | (Portugal) Leonardo Jardim | 8 June 2022 |
| Al Dhafra | (Syria) Mohammad Kwid | 26 May 2022 | End of contract | Pre-season | (Serbia) Nebojša Vignjević | 11 July 2022 |
| Al Bataeh | (Tunisia) Tarek Hadhiri | 26 May 2022 | End of contract | Pre-season | (Brazil) Caio Zanardi | 27 May 2022 |
| Al Wasl | (Brazil) Odair Hellmann | 28 June 2022 | Mutual consent | Pre-season | (Spain) Juan Antonio Pizzi | 1 July 2022 |
| Al Wahda | (Portugal) Carlos Carvalhal | 3 October 2022 | Sacked | 9th | (Spain) Manolo Jiménez | 5 October 2022 |
| Dibba Al Fujairah | (Serbia) Zoran Popović | 8 October 2022 | Sacked | 14th | (France) Grégory Dufrennes | 8 October 2022 |
| Al Dhafra | (Serbia) Nebojša Vignjević | 30 October 2022 | Sacked | 14th | (Serbia) Aleksandar Veselinović | 30 October 2022 |
| Al Bataeh | (Brazil) Caio Zanardi | 4 November 2022 | Sacked | 10th | (Morocco) Saeed Shakhit | 5 November 2022 |
| Al Nasr | (Germany) Thorsten Fink | 5 November 2022 | Sacked | 12th | (Croatia) Goran Tomić | 5 November 2022 |
| Dibba Al Fujairah | (France) Grégory Dufrennes | 14 January 2023 | Mutual consent | 13th | (United Arab Emirates) Hassan Al Abdouli | 15 January 2023 |
| Al Wahda | (Spain) Manolo Jiménez | 12 March 2023 | Sacked | 4th | (Netherlands) Arno Buitenweg^{a} | 13 March 2023 |

_{Notes
1. Interim}

== League table ==
| Pos | Team | Pld | W | D | L | GF | GA | GD | Pts | Qualification or relegation |
|---|---|---|---|---|---|---|---|---|---|---|
| 1 | Shabab Al Ahli (C) | 26 | 17 | 6 | 3 | 53 | 25 | +28 | 57 | Qualification for AFC Champions League play off round |
| 2 | Al Ain | 26 | 16 | 6 | 4 | 67 | 31 | +36 | 54 | Qualification for AFC Champions League group stage (Note: since Al Ain won the 2021–22 UAE Pro League, they qualified directly to the AFC Champions League group stage meanwhile this seasons league champions will qualify for the play-off round.) |
| 3 | Al Wahda | 26 | 15 | 7 | 4 | 48 | 26 | +22 | 52 | |
| 4 | Al Wasl | 26 | 13 | 8 | 5 | 53 | 32 | +21 | 47 | |
| 5 | Al Jazira | 26 | 14 | 4 | 8 | 50 | 39 | +11 | 46 | |
| 6 | Ajman | 26 | 13 | 5 | 8 | 41 | 38 | +3 | 44 | |
| 7 | Sharjah | 26 | 12 | 7 | 7 | 42 | 21 | +21 | 43 | Qualification for AFC Champions League play off round (Note: since Sharjah won both President's Cups, they qualified for the AFC Champions League play-off round.) |
| 8 | Kalba | 26 | 9 | 6 | 11 | 32 | 41 | −9 | 33 | |
| 9 | Al Nasr | 26 | 7 | 6 | 13 | 27 | 43 | −16 | 27 | |
| 10 | Khor Fakkan | 26 | 6 | 7 | 13 | 28 | 44 | −16 | 25 | |
| 11 | Baniyas | 26 | 6 | 6 | 14 | 34 | 46 | −12 | 24 | |
| 12 | Al Bataeh | 26 | 5 | 6 | 15 | 30 | 57 | −27 | 21 | |
| 13 | Dibba Al Fujairah (R) | 26 | 5 | 5 | 16 | 20 | 44 | −24 | 20 | Relegation to UAE Division 1 |
| 14 | Al Dhafra (R) | 26 | 3 | 3 | 20 | 26 | 64 | −38 | 12 | Relegation to UAE Division 1 |

Source: UPLeague
Rules for classification: 1) points; 2) head-to-head goal difference; 3) head-to-head goals scored; 4) head-to-head away goals scored; 5) goal difference; 6) number of goals scored; 7) number of away goals scored; 8) head-to-head points; 9) fair play ranking 10) draw
(C) Champions; (R) Relegated

== Results ==
| Home \ Away | AJM | AIN | BTH | DHA | JAZ | NAS | WAH | WAS | YAS | DAF | KAL | KHF | SAD | SHR |
|---|---|---|---|---|---|---|---|---|---|---|---|---|---|---|
| Ajman | | 1–1 | 2–1 | 2–1 | 1–1 | 4–1 | 2–3 | 4–2 | 2–0 | 3–2 | 1–0 | 0–0 | 1–3 | 2–3 |
| Al Ain | 5–1 | | 5–2 | 7–0 | 3–2 | 0–1 | 2–3 | 1–1 | 2–2 | 3–0 | 3–0 | 2–1 | 1–1 | 2–0 |
| Al Bataeh | 1–1 | 2–3 | | 1–1 | 2–4 | 2–0 | 0–4 | 1–2 | 3–3 | 0–1 | 2–2 | 2–2 | 0–6 | 0–1 |
| Al Dhafra | 0–1 | 1–4 | 1–2 | | 4–1 | 1–1 | 1–3 | 0–2 | 2–4 | 2–1 | 0–2 | 1–3 | 3–2 | 0–1 |
| Al Jazira | 0–1 | 2–1 | 3–1 | 3–2 | | 4–3 | 0–1 | 2–0 | 2–0 | 2–0 | 2–0 | 1–1 | 2–3 | 3–3 |
| Al Nasr | 2–0 | 1–3 | 2–2 | 1–0 | 0–2 | | 0–1 | 1–2 | 1–0 | 0–1 | 3–0 | 1–0 | 2–2 | 1–0 |
| Al Wahda | 0–1 | 0–3 | 2–1 | 4–2 | 3–1 | 4–0 | | 3–3 | 1–1 | 3–0 | 0–1 | 2–2 | 1–1 | 0–0 |
| Al Wasl | 2–1 | 2–3 | 3–1 | 4–0 | 1–2 | 2–0 | 2–2 | | 3–0 | 1–1 | 2–2 | 3–0 | 1–2 | 1–1 |
| Baniyas | 2–3 | 2–2 | 0–1 | 5–0 | 1–1 | 1–1 | 0–1 | 1–3 | | 0–2 | 1–2 | 1–0 | 1–2 | 0–4 |
| Dibba Al Fujairah | 1–3 | 0–2 | 0–1 | 1–1 | 0–1 | 2–1 | 1–1 | 0–1 | 1–4 | | 2–2 | 1–0 | 1–2 | 0–2 |
| Kalba | 0–2 | 2–3 | 0–2 | 2–0 | 2–1 | 5–3 | 0–2 | 1–1 | 2–1 | 2–0 | | 1–1 | 1–2 | 0–4 |
| Khor Fakkan | 2–2 | 0–3 | 3–0 | 4–3 | 2–4 | 0–0 | 0–2 | 1–5 | 1–2 | 1–0 | 2–1 | | 0–1 | 1–0 |
| Shabab Al Ahli | 1–0 | 2–1 | 3–0 | 2–0 | 2–1 | 3–0 | 2–1 | 2–2 | 1–2 | 5–1 | 0–0 | 3–1 | | 0–2 |
| Sharjah | 4–0 | 2–2 | 3–0 | 1–0 | 2–3 | 1–1 | 0–1 | 0–1 | 3–0 | 1–1 | 1–2 | 3–0 | 0–0 | |

Source: UPLeague
Legend: Blue = home team win; Yellow = draw; Red = away team win.
For upcoming matches, an "a" indicates there is an article about the rivalry between the two participants.

== Number of teams by Emirates ==
| | Emirate | Number of teams | Teams |
|---|---|---|---|
| 1 | (Emirate of Abu Dhabi) Abu Dhabi | 5 | Al Ain, Al Jazira, Al Wahda, Baniyas and Al Dhafra |
| 2 | (Emirate of Sharjah) Sharjah | 4 | Sharjah, Kalba, Khor Fakkan and Al Bataeh |
| 3 | (Emirate of Dubai) Dubai | 3 | Shabab Al Ahli, Al Nasr and Al Wasl |
| 4 | (Emirate of Ajman) Ajman | 1 | Ajman |
| 4 | (Emirate of Fujairah) Fujairah | 1 | Dibba Al Fujairah |

== Seasonal statistics ==
=== Positions by round ===
| Leader and qualification to AFC Champions League Play off round |
| qualification to AFC Champions League |
| Relegation to UAE First Division League |

| Team ╲ Round | 1 | 2 | 3 | 4 | 5 | 6 | 7 | 8 | 9 | 10 | 11 | 12 | 13 | 14 | 15 | 16 | 17 | 18 | 19 | 20 | 21 | 22 | 23 | 24 | 25 | 26 |
|---|---|---|---|---|---|---|---|---|---|---|---|---|---|---|---|---|---|---|---|---|---|---|---|---|---|---|
| Shabab Al Ahli | 14 | 7 | 5 | 7 | 7 | 6 | 5 | 3 | 3 | 1 | 1 | 2 | 1 | 1 | 1 | 2 | 1 | 1 | 1 | 1 | 1 | 1 | 1 | 1 | 1 | 1 |
| Al Ain | 7 | 3 | 8 | 4 | 4 | 4 | 3 | 8 | 7 | 8 | 7 | 7 | 7 | 7 | 5 | 4 | 3 | 3 | 2 | 2 | 2 | 2 | 2 | 2 | 2 | 2 |
| Al Wahda | 5 | 10 | 10 | 10 | 5 | 5 | 4 | 2 | 2 | 2 | 2 | 4 | 3 | 3 | 3 | 5 | 5 | 4 | 4 | 4 | 3 | 3 | 3 | 3 | 3 | 3 |
| Al Wasl | 6 | 5 | 7 | 3 | 3 | 1 | 2 | 4 | 4 | 3 | 4 | 6 | 4 | 4 | 4 | 3 | 2 | 2 | 3 | 3 | 4 | 5 | 4 | 4 | 4 | 4 |
| Al Jazira | 2 | 2 | 2 | 2 | 2 | 3 | 7 | 6 | 5 | 6 | 6 | 5 | 6 | 5 | 6 | 6 | 6 | 6 | 6 | 7 | 6 | 6 | 7 | 6 | 7 | 5 |
| Ajman | 8 | 11 | 11 | 11 | 6 | 9 | 6 | 5 | 8 | 5 | 5 | 3 | 5 | 6 | 7 | 7 | 7 | 7 | 7 | 6 | 7 | 7 | 6 | 5 | 5 | 6 |
| Sharjah | 3 | 1 | 1 | 1 | 1 | 2 | 1 | 1 | 1 | 4 | 3 | 1 | 2 | 2 | 2 | 1 | 4 | 5 | 5 | 5 | 5 | 4 | 5 | 7 | 6 | 7 |
| Kalba | 13 | 9 | 4 | 6 | 8 | 7 | 8 | 7 | 6 | 7 | 8 | 8 | 8 | 8 | 8 | 8 | 8 | 8 | 8 | 8 | 8 | 8 | 8 | 8 | 8 | 8 |
| Al Nasr | 9 | 4 | 6 | 8 | 10 | 10 | 11 | 12 | 12 | 12 | 12 | 12 | 12 | 12 | 12 | 12 | 12 | 12 | 12 | 10 | 9 | 9 | 9 | 9 | 10 | 9 |
| Khor Fakkan | 11 | 13 | 13 | 14 | 11 | 11 | 12 | 11 | 11 | 11 | 9 | 10 | 10 | 9 | 10 | 10 | 10 | 9 | 9 | 9 | 11 | 11 | 10 | 10 | 9 | 10 |
| Baniyas | 4 | 8 | 9 | 9 | 12 | 12 | 10 | 9 | 9 | 10 | 10 | 9 | 9 | 10 | 9 | 9 | 9 | 10 | 10 | 11 | 10 | 10 | 11 | 11 | 11 | 11 |
| Al Bataeh | 1 | 6 | 3 | 5 | 9 | 8 | 9 | 10 | 10 | 9 | 11 | 11 | 11 | 11 | 11 | 11 | 11 | 11 | 11 | 12 | 12 | 12 | 12 | 13 | 12 | 12 |
| Dibba Al Fujairah | 12 | 14 | 12 | 13 | 14 | 14 | 14 | 14 | 14 | 14 | 13 | 13 | 14 | 14 | 14 | 14 | 14 | 14 | 14 | 14 | 13 | 13 | 13 | 12 | 13 | 13 |
| Al Dhafra | 10 | 12 | 14 | 12 | 13 | 13 | 13 | 13 | 13 | 13 | 14 | 14 | 13 | 13 | 13 | 13 | 13 | 13 | 13 | 13 | 14 | 14 | 14 | 14 | 14 | 14 |

Source: UPLeague

=== Top scorers ===
As of 15 May 2023

| Rank | Player | Club | Goals |
|---|---|---|---|
| 1 | (Togo) Kodjo Laba | Al Ain | 28 |
| 2 | (United Arab Emirates) Ali Mabkhout | Al Jazira | 27 |
| 3 | (United Arab Emirates) Fábio Lima | Al Wasl | 19 |
| 4 | (Brazil) João Pedro | Al Wahda | 15 |
| 5 | (Brazil) Lourency | Al Bataeh | 13 |
| 6 | (Morocco) Walid Azaro | Ajman | 12 |
| 6 | (Tunisia) Firas Ben Larbi | Ajman | 12 |
| 8 | (Morocco) Soufiane Rahimi | Al Ain | 11 |
| 8 | (Argentina) Federico Cartabia | Shabab Al Ahli | 11 |
| 8 | (Ukraine) Andriy Yarmolenko | Al Ain | 11 |
| 11 | (Brazil) Caio Lucas | Sharjah | 9 |
| 11 | (Argentina) Tomás Chancalay | Al Wasl | 9 |
| 11 | (United Arab Emirates) Ahmed Al-Naqbi | Kalba | 9 |

=== Clean sheets ===
As of 14 May 2023

| Rank | Player | Club | Clean sheets |
|---|---|---|---|
| 1 | (United Arab Emirates) Mohammed Al-Shamsi | Al Wahda | 9 |
| 2 | (United Arab Emirates) Adel Al-Hosani | Sharjah | 7 |
| 2 | (United Arab Emirates) Khalid Eisa | Al Ain | 7 |
| 2 | (United Arab Emirates) Khaled Al-Senani | Al Wasl | 7 |
| 5 | (United Arab Emirates) Darwish Bin Habib | Sharjah | 6 |
| 5 | (United Arab Emirates) Ali Al-Hosani | Ajman | 6 |
| 5 | (United Arab Emirates) Ali Khasif | Al Jazira | 6 |
| 8 | (United Arab Emirates) Eisa Al-Hooti | Kalba | 5 |
| 8 | (United Arab Emirates) Ahmed Al-Hosani | Khor Fakkan | 5 |
| 8 | (United Arab Emirates) Hassan Hamza | Shabab Al Ahli | 5 |
| 8 | (United Arab Emirates) Ahmed Shambih | Al Nasr | 5 |

=== Hat tricks ===
| Player | For | Against | Result | Date | Round |
|---|---|---|---|---|---|
| (United Arab Emirates) Ali Mabkhout | Al Jazira | Khor Fakkan | 4–2 (A) | 9 September 2022 | 2 |
| (Togo) Kodjo Laba^{4} | Al Ain | Al Dhafra | 7–0 (H) | 10 September 2022 | 2 |
| (United Arab Emirates) Fábio Lima | Al Wasl | Al Dhafra | 4–0 (H) | 8 October 2022 | 5 |
| (Brazil) Rafael Elias | Baniyas | Dibba Al Fujarah | 4–1 (A) | 22 October 2022 | 7 |
| (United Arab Emirates) Ali Mabkhout | Al Jazira | Al Nasr | 4–3 (H) | 7 April 2023 | 22 |

Notes

^{4} Player scored 4 goals
(H) – Home team
(A) – Away team
