= 2015–16 Deportivo de La Coruña season =

Deportivo de La Coruña
2015–16 season
- President: Tino Fernández
- Manager: Víctor Sánchez
- Stadium: Riazor
- La Liga: 15th
- Copa del Rey: Round of 16
- Top goalscorer: League: Lucas Pérez (17); All: Lucas Pérez (17)
- Highest home attendance: 29,666
- Lowest home attendance: 16,185
- Average home league attendance: 23,008
Home colours	Away colours	Third colours

The 2015–16 season Deportivo de La Coruña season was the club's 109th in its history and its 44th in the top-tier of Spanish football.

== Stadium information ==
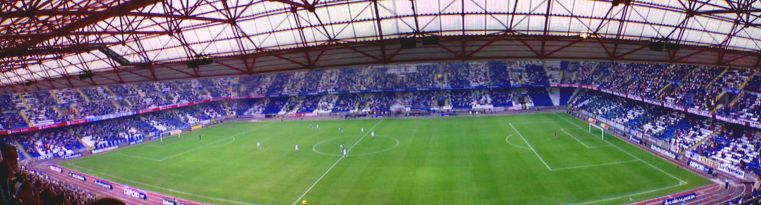
Panoramic view of the stadium

- Name – Riazor
- City – A Coruña
- Capacity – 34,600
- Inauguration – 1944
- Pitch size – 105 x 68 m

== Players ==
=== Current squad ===
As of 31 August 2015

Note: Flags indicate national team as defined under FIFA eligibility rules; some limited exceptions apply. Players may hold more than one non-FIFA nationality.

No.	Pos.	Nation	Player
1	GK	ARG	Germán Lux
2	DF	ESP	Manuel Pablo (Captain)
3	DF	ESP	Fernando Navarro
4	MF	ESP	Álex Bergantiños
5	MF	ESP	Pedro Mosquera
6	MF	ESP	Cani
7	MF	ESP	Lucas Pérez
8	MF	BIH	Haris Medunjanin
9	FW	ESP	Oriol Riera
10	MF	ESP	Juan Domínguez
11	DF	ESP	Juanfran (on loan from Watford)
12	DF	BRA	Sidnei (on loan from Benfica)
13	GK	ESP	Fabri

No.	Pos.	Nation	Player
14	DF	ESP	Alejandro Arribas
15	DF	ESP	Laure (Vice-captain)
16	DF	POR	Luisinho
17	MF	ARG	Fede Cartabia (on loan from Valencia)
18	DF	ESP	Saúl
19	MF	MAR	Fayçal Fajr (on loan from Elche)
20	FW	URU	Jonathan Rodríguez (on loan from Benfica)
21	MF	ESP	Luis Alberto (on loan from Liverpool)
22	MF	CRC	Celso Borges
23	DF	ESP	Alberto Lopo
24	MF	ARG	Jonás Gutiérrez
25	GK	ESP	Manu Fernández

=== Out on loan ===
Note: Flags indicate national team as defined under FIFA eligibility rules; some limited exceptions apply. Players may hold more than one non-FIFA nationality.

No.	Pos.	Nation	Player
—	DF	ESP	Pablo Insua (on loan at Leganés)
—	MF	ESP	Bicho (on loan at Leganés)
—	MF	ESP	Álvaro Queijeiro (on loan at Pontevedra)
—	FW	ESP	Luis Fernández (on loan at Huesca)

== Competitions ==
=== La Liga ===
==== League table ====
Pos	Team	Pld	W	D	L	GF	GA	GD	Pts
13	Espanyol	38	12	7	19	40	74	−34	43 (Note: Espanyol finished ahead of Eibar on head-to-head goal difference; Eibar 2–1 Espanyol, Espanyol 4–2 Eibar.)
14	Eibar	38	11	10	17	49	61	−12	43
15	Deportivo La Coruña	38	8	18	12	45	61	−16	42
16	Granada	38	10	9	19	46	69	−23	39 (Note: Granada finished ahead of Sporting Gijón on head-to-head record; Granada 2–0 Sporting Gijón, Sporting Gijón 3–3 Granada.)
17	Sporting Gijón	38	10	9	19	40	62	−22	39

Source: La Liga, Soccerway
Rules for classification: 1) Points; 2) Head-to-head points; 3) Head-to-head goal difference; 4) Goal difference; 5) Goals scored; 6) Fair-play points; 7) Play-off.

==== Result round by round ====
Round	1	2	3	4	5	6	7	8	9	10	11	12	13	14	15	16	17	18	19	20	21	22	23	24	25	26	27	28	29	30	31	32	33	34	35	36	37	38
Ground	A	H	A	H	A	H	A	H	A	H	A	H	A	H	A	H	H	A	H	H	A	H	A	H	A	H	A	H	A	H	A	H	A	H	A	A	H	A
Result	D	D	W	L	W	W	D	D	L	D	D	W	W	D	D	W	D	L	L	D	D	D	D	D	L	L	L	D	L	W	D	L	D	L	D	L	W	L
Position	8	9	7	9	7	6	6	6	6	9	9	8	5	6	6	6	6	7	9	8	9	9	9	10	9	10	12	13	13	10	11	13	13	14	15	15	13	

Updated to match(es) played on 14 May 2016. Source:
A = Away; H = Home; W = Win; D = Draw; L = Loss

==== Matches ====
Win Draw Loss

22 August 2015 1	Deportivo	0–0	Real Sociedad	A Coruña
18:30 (UTC+2)	Mosquera (yellow card) 14'; Laure (yellow card) 49'; Lopo (yellow card) 88'	Report	Zaldúa (yellow card) 9'; Bergara (yellow card) 65'	Stadium: Riazor; Attendance: 22,301; Referee: Antonio Mateu Lahoz

30 August 2015 2	Valencia	1–1	Deportivo	Valencia
	Danilo (yellow card) 44'; Negredo 45'; Barragán (yellow card) 72' (yellow-red card) 84'; De Paul (yellow card) 86'	Report	Pérez 39'; Lux (yellow card) 75'	Stadium: Mestalla; Attendance: 40,734; Referee: José González González

14 September 2015 3	Rayo Vallecano	1–3	Deportivo	Madrid
20:30 (UTC+2)	Embarba 27'; Ebert (yellow card) 35', (red card); Llorente (yellow card) 73'	Report	Borges 7'; Luis Alberto 28'; Laure (yellow card) 32'; Arribas (yellow card) 45'; Pérez 61'	Stadium: Campo de Vallecas; Referee: Ricardo de Burgos Bengoetxea

20 September 2015 4	Deportivo	2–3	Sporting Gijón	A Coruña
16:00 (UTC+2)	Juanfran 16'; Luis Alberto 28'; Fajr (yellow card) 73'; Sidnei (yellow card) 85'; Luisinho (yellow card) 90+2'	Report	Sanabria 4', 8', (yellow card) 77'; Menéndez 34'; Cases (yellow card) 61'; Carmona (yellow card) 70'	Stadium: Riazor; Attendance: 25,801; Referee: Eduardo Prieto Iglesias

24 September 2015 5	Real Betis	1–2	Deportivo	Seville
22:05 (UTC+2)	Joaquín (yellow card) 27'; Piccini (yellow card) 43'; Petros 59'; Westermann (yellow card) 86'	Report	Rodríguez (yellow card) 45'; Cartabia 54'; Fajr 72'; Navarro (yellow card) 76'; Lux (yellow card) 79'; Laure (yellow card) 82'; Luisinho (yellow card) 90+4'	Stadium: Benito Villamarín; Attendance: 36,093; Referee: Jesús Gil Manzano

27 September 2015 6	Deportivo	3–0	Espanyol	A Coruña
16:00 (UTC+2)	Álvaro 14' (o.g.); Lopo (yellow card) 24'; Pérez (yellow card) 26', (goal) 27', 47'; Laure (yellow card) 64'; Bergantiños (yellow card) 76'	Report	Asensio (yellow card) 13'; Diop (yellow card) 33' (yellow-red card) 79'; Roco (yellow card) 73'; R. Duarte (yellow card) 77'	Stadium: Riazor; Attendance: 20,750; Referee: José María Sánchez Martínez

3 October 2015 7	Granada	1–1	Deportivo	Granada
18:15 (UTC+2)	Piti 65'; Success (yellow card) 90+2'	Report	Fajr 25'; Gutiérrez (yellow card) 62'; Arribas (yellow card) 87'; Riera (yellow card) 90'	Stadium: Los Cármenes; Attendance: 14,228; Referee: Iñaki Vicandi Garrido

18 October 2015 8	Deportivo	2–2	Athletic Bilbao	A Coruña
20:30 (UTC+2)	Pérez (yellow card) 62', (goal) 80'; Sidnei (yellow card) 85'; Arribas 89'	Report	Williams 30'; Aduriz 63'; Laporte (yellow card) 65'; Beñat (yellow card) 75'	Stadium: Riazor; Attendance: 25,239; Referee: Santiago Jaime Latre

24 October 2015 9	Málaga	2–0	Deportivo	Málaga
22:05 (UTC+2)	Tighadouini 62'; Juankar 85'	Report	Mosquera (yellow card) 9'	Stadium: La Rosaleda; Attendance: 20,739; Referee: Carlos Velasco Carballo

30 October 2015 10	Deportivo	1–1	Atlético Madrid	A Coruña
20:30 (UTC+1)	Fajr (yellow card) 15'; Pérez 77'; Cartabia (yellow card) 90'	Report	Tiago 34'	Stadium: Riazor; Attendance: 23,609; Referee: Pedro Pérez Montero

7 November 2015 11	Levante	1–1	Deportivo	Valencia
18:15 (UTC+1)	Camarasa 53'; Toño (yellow card) 62'; Simão Mate (yellow card) 82'; Víctor (yellow card) 84'; García (yellow card) 90+2'	Report	Pérez 22'; Borges (yellow card) 52'; Navarro (yellow card) 76'	Stadium: Ciutat de València; Attendance: 13,695; Referee: Carlos del Cerro Grande

21 November 2015 12	Deportivo	2–0	Celta Vigo	A Coruña
22:05 (UTC+1)	Pérez (yellow card) 23', (goal) 23'; Lux (yellow card) 25'; Mosquera (yellow card) 53'; Rodríguez (yellow card) 53'; Luisinho (yellow card) 70'; Juanfran (yellow card) 78'	Report	Hernández (yellow card) 40'; Jonny (yellow card) 78'; Nolito (yellow card) 84'	Stadium: Riazor; Attendance: 29,666; Referee: Alfonso Álvarez Izquierdo

28 November 2015 13	Las Palmas	0–2	Deportivo	Las Palmas
22:00 (UTC+1)	David Simón (yellow card) 16'; Araujo (yellow card) 39'; Aythami (yellow card) 66'; Culio (yellow card) 90+3'	Report	David Simón 19' (o.g.); Mosquera (yellow card) 25'; Arribas (yellow card) 67'; Juanfran (yellow card) 79'; Pérez 90+1'	Stadium: Gran Canaria; Attendance: 19,148; Referee: Carlos Clos Gómez

12 May 2015 14	Deportivo	1–1	Sevilla	A Coruña
22:00 (UTC+1)	Cani (yellow card) 10'; Pérez 22'; Mosquera (yellow card) 88'	Report	Kolodziejczak (yellow card) 25'; Krychowiak (yellow card) 56'; Iborra (yellow card) 74', (goal) 76'	Stadium: Riazor; Attendance: 25,013; Referee: Ricardo de Burgos Bengoetxea

12 December 2015 15	Barcelona	2–2	Deportivo	Barcelona
16:00 (UTC+1)	Messi 39'; Rakitić 62'	Report	Luisinho (yellow card) 41'; Laure (yellow card) 72'; Pérez 77'; Bergantiños 86'	Stadium: Camp Nou; Attendance: 65,531; Referee: José María Sánchez Martínez

19 December 2015 16	Deportivo	2–0	Eibar	A Coruña
22:05 (UTC+1)	Luisinho (yellow card) 21' (yellow-red card) 68'; Pérez 41' (pen.); Arribas 73'	Report	Pantić (yellow card) 12'; Riesgo (yellow card) 40'	Stadium: Riazor; Attendance: 19,281; Referee: Xavier Estrada Fernández

30 December 2015 17	Getafe	0–0	Deportivo	Getafe
20:30 (UTC+1)	J. Rodríguez (yellow card) 49'; Lafita (yellow card) 54'; Lago (yellow card) 90+2'	Report	Cartabia (yellow card) 70'	Stadium: Coliseum Alfonso Pérez; Attendance: 5,667; Referee: Alberto Undiano Mallenco

3 January 2016 18	Deportivo	1–2	Villarreal	A Coruña
18:15 (UTC+1)	Luis Alberto (yellow card) 9', (goal) 48'; Arribas (yellow card) 35'; Navarro (yellow card) 90+3'	Report	Bruno 36', 90+5' (pen.), (yellow card) 39'; Dos Santos (yellow card) 43'; Soldado (yellow card) 81'	Stadium: Riazor; Attendance: 23,815; Referee: David Fernández Borbalán

9 January 2016 19	Real Madrid	5–0	Deportivo	Madrid
20:30 (UTC+1)	Benzema 15', 90+1'; Bale 22', 49', 63'	Report	Lux (yellow card) 15'; Mosquera (yellow card) 64'; Arribas (yellow card) 60'	Stadium: Santiago Bernabéu; Attendance: 71,267; Referee: Pedro Pérez Montero

16 January 2016 20	Real Sociedad	1–1	Deportivo	San Sebastián
22:05 (UTC+1)	Jonathas (yellow card) 75'; Prieto 75' (pen.)	Report	Luis Alberto 26'; Mosquera (yellow card) 70'; Gutiérrez (yellow card) 74'; Lopo (yellow card) 86'	Stadium: Anoeta; Attendance: 16,783; Referee: Juan Martínez Munuera

23 January 2016 21	Deportivo	1–1	Valencia	A Coruña
18:15 (UTC+1)	Pérez 27'; Juanfran (yellow card) 64'; Lux (yellow card) 66'; Arribas (yellow card) 81'	Report	Gomes (yellow card) 47'; Mustafi (yellow card) 78'; Vezo (yellow card) 79'; Negredo 90+3'	Stadium: Riazor; Attendance: 23,782; Referee: Mario Melero López

1 February 2016 22	Deportivo	2–2	Rayo Vallecano	A Coruña
20:30 (UTC+1)	Pérez 19'; Fajr 46'	Report	Miku 8'; Jozabed 23'	Stadium: Riazor; Attendance: 19,055; Referee: Iñaki Vicandi Garrido

7 February 2016 23	Sporting Gijón	1–1	Deportivo	Gijón
22:05 (UTC+1)	Vranješ (yellow card) 20'; Jony 32', (yellow card) 34'	Report	Arribas (yellow card) 6'; Luis Alberto 41'; Cartabia (yellow card) 89'	Stadium: El Molinón; Attendance: 21,690; Referee: Alejandro Hernández Hernández

13 February 2016 24	Deportivo	2–2	Real Betis	A Coruña
22:05 (UTC+1)	Bergantiños 15', (yellow card) 52'; Fajr 51'	Report	Musonda 20'; Vargas 37'	Stadium: Estadio Riazor; Attendance: 17,184; Referee: Alberto Undiano Mallenco

21 February 2016 26	Espanyol	1–0	Deportivo	Cornellà de Llobregat
18:00 CET (UTC+01:00)	Asensio (yellow card) 19', (goal) 52'; Sánchez (yellow card) 57'; Caicedo (yellow card) 90+3'	Report	Arribas (yellow card) 47'	Stadium: Cornellà-El Prat; Attendance: 28,455; Referee: Ricardo de Burgos Bengoetxea

28 February 2016 26	Deportivo	0–1	Granada	A Coruña
18:00 CET (UTC+01:00)	Juanfran (yellow card) 23'; Navarro (yellow card) 32'; Lux (red card) 90+3'	Report	El-Arabi 24' (pen.); Édgar (yellow card) 85'; Costa (yellow card) 88'; Fernández (yellow card) 90+3'	Stadium: Riazor; Attendance: 23,616; Referee: Juan Martínez Munuera

2 March 2016 27	Athletic Bilbao	4–1	Deportivo	Bilbao
20:00 CET (UTC+01:00)	Muniain 13'; Aduriz (yellow card) 18', (goal) 36', 53', 60'	Report	Mosquera (yellow card) 17'; Borges (yellow card) 22'; Riera 51'; Lopo (yellow card) 59'	Stadium: San Mamés; Attendance: 37,292; Referee: Antonio Mateu Lahoz (Valencia)

6 March 2016 28	Deportivo	3–3	Málaga	A Coruña
22:05 CET (UTC+01:00)	Luis Alberto (yellow card) 21'; Borges 43'; Bergantiños (yellow card) 45+4'; Cartabia 69'; Mosquera (yellow card) 78'; Pérez 80'; Manu (yellow card) 90+4'	Report	Charles 29', (yellow card) 54'; Torres (yellow card) 41'; Camacho 63', (yellow card) 77' (yellow-red card) 90+3'; Arribas 89' (o.g.); Albentosa (yellow card) 90+4'	Stadium: Riazor; Attendance: 18,446; Referee: Carlos Velasco Carballo

12 March 2016 29	Atlético Madrid	3–0	Deportivo La Coruña	Madrid
20:30 CET (UTC+01:00)	Saúl 18'; Carrasco (yellow card) 41'; Griezmann 60'; Correa 83'	Report	Laure (yellow card) 90+2'	Stadium: Vicente Calderón; Attendance: 44,122; Referee: Mario Melero López

19 March 2016 30	Deportivo	2–1	Levante	A Coruña
20:30 CET (UTC+01:00)	Luis Alberto 43', (yellow card) 90'; Mariño 85' (o.g.); Riera (yellow card) 88'	Report	Lerma (yellow card) 33'; Rossi 50'; Simão Mate (yellow card) 69'; Verza (yellow card) 90'	Stadium: Riazor; Attendance: 24,920; Referee: Iñaki Vicandi Garrido

3 April 2016 31	Celta Vigo	1–1	Deportivo	Vigo
18:00 CET (UTC+01:00)	Jonny (yellow card) 15'; Wass (yellow card) 18'; Nolito 30'; Cabral (yellow card) 78'; Mallo (yellow card) 90+4'	Report	Borges 21'; Arribas (yellow card) 61' (yellow-red card) 68'; Luisinho (yellow card) 87'; Fernández (yellow card) 90+2'	Stadium: Balaídos; Attendance: 21,253; Referee: David Fernández Borbalán

10 April 2016 32	Deportivo	1–3	Las Palmas	A Coruña
20:30 CET (UTC+01:00)	Pérez 47'; Borges (yellow card) 77'	Report	D. Castellano (yellow card) 36'; Araujo 58', 90+3'; García 79'	Stadium: Riazor; Attendance: 21,686; Referee: Alfonso Álvarez Izquierdo

17 April 2016 33	Sevilla	1–1	Deportivo	Seville
16:00 CEST (UTC+02:00)	Iborra 21'; Carriço (yellow card) 68'; Curro (yellow card) 70'	Report	Lopo (yellow card) 61'; Riera 81', (yellow card) 84'	Stadium: Ramón Sánchez Pizjuán; Attendance: 30,390; Referee: Santiago Jaime Latre

20 April 2016 34	Deportivo	0–8	Barcelona	A Coruña
20:00 CEST (UTC+02:00)	Cani (yellow card) 30'	Report	Suárez 11', 24', 53', 64'; Rakitić 47'; Messi 73'; Bartra 79'; Neymar 81'	Stadium: Riazor; Attendance: 28,956; Referee: Ricardo de Burgos Bengoetxea

24 April 2016 35	Eibar	1–1	Deportivo	Eibar
22:05 CEST (UTC+02:00)	Adrián 8'	Report	Fajr (yellow card) 53'; Cartabia 71'	Stadium: Ipurua; Attendance: 4,606; Referee: Eduardo Prieto Iglesias

1 May 2016 36	Deportivo	0–2	Getafe	A Coruña
18:15 CEST (UTC+01:00)	Borges (yellow card) 19' (yellow-red card) 64'; Navarro (yellow card) 75'	Report	Lacen (yellow card) 20'; Sarabia (yellow card) 27'; Pedro León 41'; Vigaray (yellow card) 50', (goal) 85'; Cala (yellow card) 72'; Medrán (yellow card) 73'; Gómez (yellow card) 90+3'	Stadium: Riazor; Attendance: 25,007; Referee: Carlos Clos Gómez

8 May 2016 37	Villarreal	0–2	Deportivo	Villarreal
17:00 CEST (UTC+01:00)	Bonera (yellow card) 10'; Trigueros (yellow card) 49'; Ruiz (yellow card) 51'	Report	Fajr 32'; Pérez 57'; Arribas (yellow card) 88'	Stadium: El Madrigal; Attendance: 12,843; Referee: Xavier Estrada Fernández

14 May 2016 38	Deportivo	0–2	Real Madrid	A Coruña
17:00 CEST (UTC+02:00)	Mosquera (yellow card) 57'	Report	Ronaldo 8', 25'; Kroos (yellow card) 50'; Ramos (yellow card) 86'; Marcelo (yellow card) 90'	Stadium: Riazor; Attendance: 29,017; Referee: Antonio Mateu Lahoz

== See also ==
2015–16 La Liga
