= Abu Dhabi City derby =

Abu Dhabi City Derby
- Other names: A'asima Derby (Capital)
- Location: Capital Region
- Teams: Al Wahda; Al Jazira
- Latest meeting: Al Wahda 4–2 Al Jazira (11 December 2023)
- Next meeting: Al Wahda v Al Jazira (3 March 2024)

Statistics
- Total meetings: 83
- Most wins: Al Wahda (37 wins)
- Largest victory: Al Wahda 7–0 Al Jazira (1986)

The Abu Dhabi City Derby or the Capital Derby is the Derby between Emirati football teams Al Jazira and Al Wahda.

== Background ==
The rivalry began in 1974 when both clubs were formed in the same city and neighborhood, both teams are less than two kilometers away from each other, but both clubs only started to play more often in the 1980s when Al Jazira finally got promoted to the UAE League. The rivalry was intensified during the 90s when Al Wahda experienced a rise in the league, winning their first title in 1999 while Al Jazira fell short and would have to wait until 2011 to experience their first league title. In 2005–06 season, Al Wahda's 5–1 victory over Al Jazira denied them the league title as Al Jazira finished two points behind them and the league winners Al Ahli. In 2009–10 season, Al Jazira was set to win the league unbeaten but ultimately lost 2–1 to Al Wahda and lost first place, Baiano who was a former Al Jazira player scored both goals in that match. Al Wahda would win its remaining games to clinch the title. Al Jazira would later manage to do the double in 2011 where they won their first league title and smashed Al Wahda 4–0 in the President's cup final.

== Biggest Wahda wins ==
Al Wahda 7-0 Al Jazira 1986

Al Wahda 7-1 Al Jazira 1995

Al Jazira 1–5 Al Wahda 2005

Al Wahda 6–0 Al Jazira 2017

Al Wahda 4-1 Al Jazira 2018

== Biggest Jazira wins ==
Al Jazira 4–0 Al Wahda 15 February 2009

Al Wahda 0–4 Al Jazira 11 April 2011

Al Jazira 5–1 Al Wahda 19 January 2017

Al Wahda 0–4 Al Jazira 6 December 2019

== Match History – Summary ==
=== Last five fixtures ===
Date	Home team	Score	Away team	Venue	Competition
21 May 2022	Al Jazira	1–2	Al Wahda	MBZ	Pro League
18 April 2023	Al Wahda	3–1	Al Jazira	Al Nahyan	Pro League
25 August 2023	Al Jazira	1–2	Al Wahda	MBZ	Pro League
20 October 2023	Al Jazira	2–1	Al Wahda	MBZ	League Cup
11 December 2023	Al Wahda	4–2	Al Jazira	Al Nahyan	League Cup

=== Head to head record ===
The two teams have played a total of 83 games in league and cup.

	Wahda wins	Draws	Jazira wins
League	31	13	18
Cups	6	4	11
Total	37	17	29

Last update:20 October 2023

== Honours ==
Al Jazira	Competition	Al Wahda
Domestic
3	Pro League	4
3	President's Cup	2
2	League Cup/Federation Cup	5
1	Super Cup	4
2	1st Division	2
11	Total	17
MENA
1	GCC Cup	—
1	Total	0
12	Grand total	17
