= Federico Cartabia =

Argentine footballer

Fede Cartabia
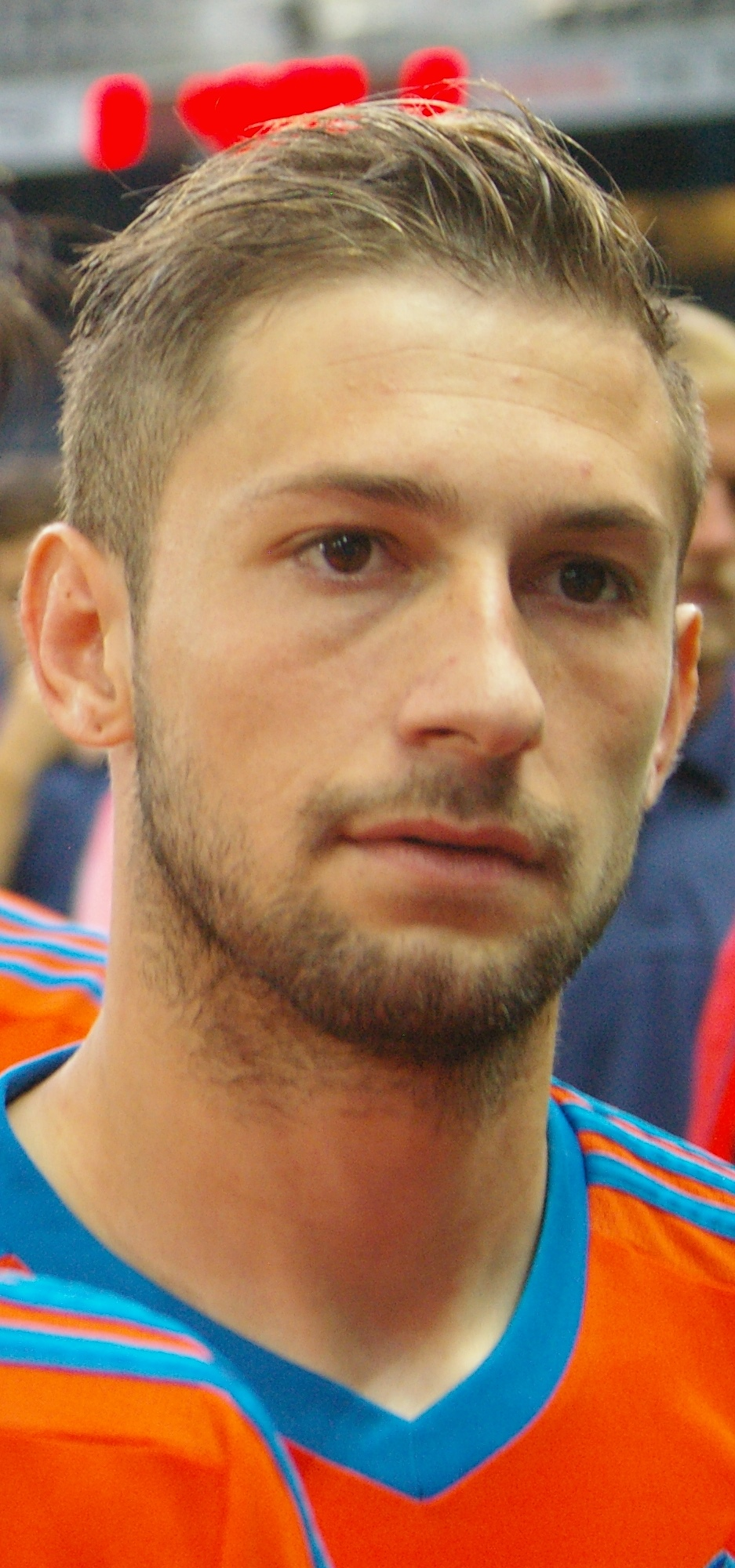
- Cartabia with Valencia in 2015

Personal information
- Full name: Federico Nicolás Cartabia
- Date of birth: 20 January 1993 (age 33)
- Place of birth: Rosario, Argentina
- Height: 1.70 m (5 ft 7 in)
- Position: Winger

Team information
- Current team: Shabab Al Ahli
- Number: 10

Youth career
- Rosario Central
- 2006–2012: Valencia

Senior career*
Years	Team	Apps	(Gls)
2012–2013	Valencia B	30	(7)
2013–2017	Valencia	29	(0)
2014–2015	→ Córdoba (loan)	30	(4)
2015–2016	→ Deportivo La Coruña (loan)	26	(3)
2017–2021	Deportivo La Coruña	54	(5)
2017	→ Braga (loan)	11	(3)
2019–2021	→ Shabab Al Ahli (loan)	28	(6)
2022–	Shabab Al Ahli	92	(24)

International career
2013	Argentina U20	3	(0)
- * Club domestic league appearances and goals as of 13:15, 28 September 2026 (UTC)

Federico "Fede" Nicolás Cartabia (born 20 January 1993) is an Argentine professional footballer who plays for Emirati club Shabab Al Ahli Club as a winger or attacking midfielder.

== Club career ==
=== Valencia ===
Born in Rosario, Santa Fe, Cartabia moved to Spain and Valencia CF at the age of 13, going on to represent several of its youth sides. He made his senior debut in the 2012–13 season, with the reserves in the Segunda División B.

Cartabia started playing with the first team in the 2013 pre-season, after impressing manager Miroslav Đukić. He renewed his contract in late July, with the new link running until June 2017 and having a buyout clause of €20 million.

Cartabia made his debut in La Liga on 17 August 2013, starting and playing 65 minutes in a 1–0 home win against Málaga CF. He scored his first goals for the Che on 24 October, a brace in the 5–1 victory over FC St. Gallen in the group stage of the UEFA Europa League.

On 11 July 2014, Cartabia was loaned out to newly promoted Córdoba CF in a season-long deal with a buying option. He made his debut for the Andalusians on 25 August, coming on as a substitute for Daniel Pinillos in a 2–0 loss away to Real Madrid. His first goal in the top flight arrived five days later, when he closed the 1–1 home draw with RC Celta de Vigo.

=== Deportivo ===
On 30 July 2015, Cartabia was loaned to another club in the top division, Deportivo de La Coruña, for one year. In January 2017, he cut ties with Valencia and agreed to a permanent five-year contract at the Galicians, being subsequently loaned to S.C. Braga of the Portuguese Primeira Liga for five months.

Back at the Estadio Riazor, on 26 August 2017 Cartabia opened an eventual 2–2 draw at Levante UD. The campaign ended in relegation to Segunda División.

=== Shabab Al Ahli ===
Cartabia spent the 2019–20 and 2020–21 seasons on loan to UAE Pro League side Shabab Al Ahli Club. He signed a permanent deal in 2022, then scored a career-best 11 goals in 2022–23 – along with six assists – to help his team claim the eighth national championship in their history.

== Career statistics ==
As of match played 17 January 2025

Club	Season	Division	League		National cup (Note: Includes Copa del Rey, UAE President's Cup)		League cup (Note: Includes UAE League Cup)		Continental		Other		Total	
Club	Season	Division	Apps	Goals	Apps	Goals	Apps	Goals	Apps	Goals	Apps	Goals	Apps	Goals
Valencia B	2012–13	Segunda División B	30	7	–		–		–		–		30	7
Valencia	2013–14	La Liga	25	0	3	0	–		12 (Note: Appearances in UEFA Europa League)	3	–		40	3
Valencia	2016–17	La Liga	4	0	2	0	–		–		—		6	0
Valencia	Total		29	0	5	0	—		12	3	—		46	3
Córdoba (loan)	2014–15	La Liga	30	4	0	0	–		–		—		30	4
Deportivo (loan)	2015–16	La Liga	26	3	3	1	–		–		—		29	4
Deportivo	2017–18	La Liga	20	2	0	0	—		—		—		20	2
Deportivo	2018–19	Segunda División	34	3	1	1	—		—		—		35	4
Deportivo	2019–20	Segunda División	0	0	0	0	—		—		—		0	0
Deportivo	Total		80	8	4	2	—		—		—		84	10
Braga (loan)	2016–17	Primeira Liga	11	3	0	0	0	0	—		—		11	3
Shabab Al Ahli	2019–20	UAE Pro League	15	4	2	0	7	2	2 (Note: Appearances in AFC Champions League)	0	1 (Note: Appearance in UAE Super Cup)	0	27	6
Shabab Al Ahli	2020–21	UAE Pro League	13	2	2	2	6	4	—		1	0	22	8
Shabab Al Ahli	2021–22	UAE Pro League	8	2	0	0	3	2	6	5	—		17	9
Shabab Al Ahli	2022–23	UAE Pro League	20	11	2	0	2	1	—		—		24	12
Shabab Al Ahli	2023–24	UAE Pro League	18	4	2	0	2	0	0	0	1	2	23	6
Shabab Al Ahli	2024–25	UAE Pro League	8	2	1	1	3	2	7 (Note: Two appearances in AFC Champions League Elite, five appearances and one goal in AFC Champions League Two)	1	1	0	20	6
Shabab Al Ahli	Total		82	25	9	3	23	11	15	6	4	2	133	47
Career total			262	47	18	5	23	11	27	9	4	2	334	74

== Honours ==
Shabab Al Ahli

- UAE Pro League: 2022–23
- UAE President's Cup: 2020–21
- UAE League Cup: 2020–21
- UAE Super Cup: 2020, 2023, 2024
