= Nabil Ghilas =

Footballer (born 1990)

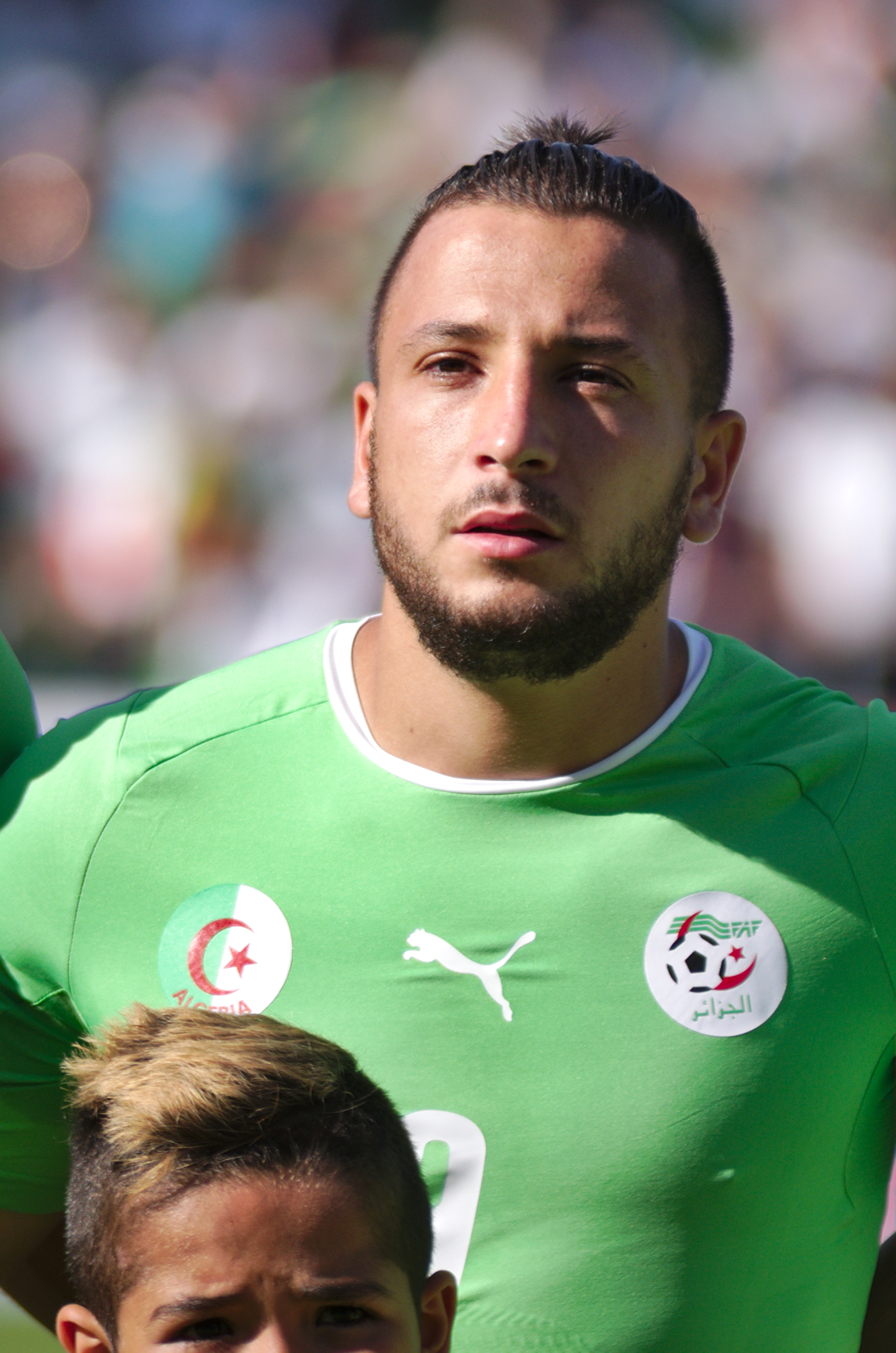
- Ghilas with Algeria in 2014

Personal information
- Full name: Nabil Ghilas
- Date of birth: 20 April 1990 (age 36)
- Place of birth: Marseille, France
- Height: 1.83 m (6 ft 0 in)
- Position: Striker

Team information
- Current team: Berre SpC
- Number: 10

Youth career
- 2007–2008: Burel FC
- 2008–2009: AJ Bosquet-Néréïdes

Senior career*
Years	Team	Apps	(Gls)
2009–2010	Cassis Carnoux	23	(1)
2010–2013	Moreirense	47	(15)
2010–2011	→ Vizela (loan)	26	(6)
2013–2017	Porto	16	(1)
2013	Porto B	1	(0)
2014–2015	→ Córdoba (loan)	27	(7)
2015–2016	→ Levante (loan)	20	(0)
2016–2017	→ Gaziantepspor (loan)	29	(8)
2017–2019	Göztepe	29	(7)
2019–2020	Vitória FC	15	(2)
2021–2022	Athlético Marseille	1	(0)
2023-	Berre SpC		

International career
2013–2014	Algeria	8	(2)
- * Club domestic league appearances and goals as of 22:44, 4 August 2022 (UTC)

Nabil Ghilas (born 20 April 1990) is a professional footballer who plays as a striker for Berre SpC. Born in France, he played for the Algeria national team.

== Club career ==
=== Early years and Moreirense ===
Born in Marseille, France, Ghilas only played amateur football in the country. In 2010, aged 20, he transferred to Moreirense F.C. in Portugal, being immediately loaned to F.C. Vizela in the third division. He returned for the 2011–12 season, helping the club return to the Primeira Liga after a seven-year absence.

Ghilas played all 30 games for the Moreira de Cónegos side in the 2012–13 campaign, scoring 13 goals in the league and 16 overall. Highlights included braces in home wins against C.D. Nacional (3–1) and S.C. Beira-Mar (3–0), but his team suffered immediate relegation.

=== Porto ===
On 8 July 2013, Ghilas joined FC Porto on a four-year contract for a fee rumoured to be around €3 million, with a buyout clause of €30m. He made his official debut on 22 September, playing injury time in a 2–2 draw at G.D. Estoril Praia.

Ghilas scored his first goal for the northerners on 5 February 2014, against the same opponent for a 2–1 home win in the quarter-finals of the Taça de Portugal. His second came 22 days later, as he netted the 3–3 at Eintracht Frankfurt in the UEFA Europa League round of 32 and Porto progressed 5–5 on aggregate; on both occasions, he came on as a second-half substitute.

On 1 September 2014, Ghilas was loaned to Spanish club Córdoba CF. His maiden La Liga appearance occurred on 12 September, replacing Mike Havenaar in the 59th minute of a 1–1 away draw against UD Almería.

Ghilas scored his first goal for the Andalusians on 18 October, netting his team's only in a 2–1 home loss to Málaga CF. On 10 July 2015, he moved to fellow league side Levante UD on loan for one year.

== International career ==
Ghilas was called up to the Algeria national team for the first time in March 2013, for the 2014 FIFA World Cup qualifier against Benin, but did not play in the match. He won his first cap on 9 June against the same opponent and for the same competition, replacing Islam Slimani in the 74th minute and scoring the last goal in a 3–1 away victory.

Ghilas made his World Cup debut on 17 June 2014, playing the last six minutes of a 2–1 group stage loss to Belgium in Belo Horizonte.

== Personal life ==
Ghilas' older brother, Kamel, is also a former footballer and a forward. He too played in France, Portugal and for Algeria.

== Career statistics ==
=== Club ===
As of match played 27 November 2021

Appearances and goals by club, season and competition
Club	Season	League			National cup (Note: Includes Taça de Portugal, Copa del Rey, Turkish Cup)		League cup (Note: Includes Taça da Liga)		Continental		Total	
Club	Season	Division	Apps	Goals	Apps	Goals	Apps	Goals	Apps	Goals	Apps	Goals
Cassis Carnoux	2009–10	CFA	23	1	0	0	—		—		23	1
Moreirense	2010–11	Liga de Honra	0	0	0	0	0	0	—		0	0
Moreirense	2011–12	Liga de Honra	17	2	3	1	4	1	—		24	4
Moreirense	2012–13	Primeira Liga	30	13	2	0	5	3	—		37	16
Moreirense	Total		47	15	5	1	9	4	—		61	20
Vizela (loan)	2010–11	Segunda Divisão	26	6	0	0	—		—		26	6
Porto	2013–14	Primeira Liga	16	1	5	1	4	0	10 (Note: Four appearances in UEFA Champions League, six appearances and two goals in UEFA Europa League)	2	35	4
Porto B	2013–14	Segunda Liga	1	0	—		—		—		1	0
Córdoba (loan)	2014–15	La Liga	27	7	1	0	—		—		28	7
Levante (loan)	2015–16	La Liga	20	0	2	0	—		—		22	0
Gaziantepspor (loan)	2016–17	Süper Lig	29	8	1	0	—		—		30	8
Göztepe	2017–18	Süper Lig	21	6	0	0	—		—		21	6
Göztepe	2018–19	Süper Lig	8	1	1	0	—		—		9	1
Vitória FC	2019–20	Primeira Liga	15	2	2	3	2	0	—		19	5
Athlético Marseille	2021–22	National 3	1	0	—		—		—		1	0
Career total			234	47	17	5	15	4	10	2	276	58

=== International goals ===
As of 31 May 2014
Scores and results list Algeria's goal tally first, score column indicates score after each Ghilas goal.

List of international goals scored by Nabil Ghilas
No.	Date	Venue	Opponent	Score	Result	Competition
1	9 June 2013	Mustapha Tchaker, Blida, Algeria	Benin	3–1	3–1	2014 World Cup qualification
2	31 May 2014	Tourbillon, Sion, Switzerland	Armenia	2–0	3–1	Friendly

== Honours ==
Porto

- Supertaça Cândido de Oliveira: 2013
