= Jonathan Bijimine =

Congolese footballer (born 1994)

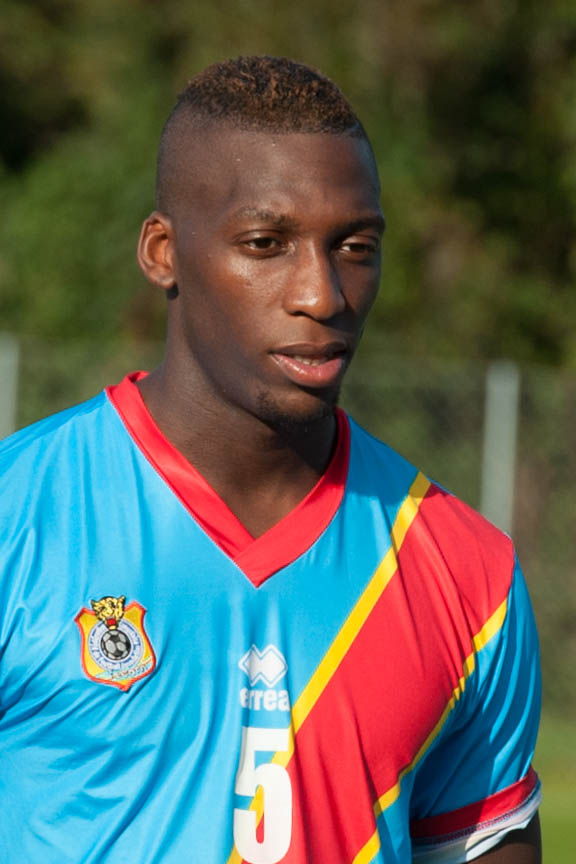
- Bijimine with DR Congo national U20 team in October 2014.

Personal information
- Full name: Jonathan Kabasele Bijimine
- Date of birth: 9 July 1994 (age 32)
- Place of birth: Amiens, France
- Height: 1.90 m (6 ft 3 in)
- Positions: Defender; midfielder

Youth career
- Sedan

Senior career*
Years	Team	Apps	(Gls)
2012–2013	Sedan II	10	(2)
2012–2013	Sedan	14	(0)
2013–2014	Perugia	0	(0)
2014	→ Barletta (loan)	6	(0)
2014–2016	Córdoba B	58	(6)
2015–2017	Córdoba	29	(0)
2017–2018	Apollon Smyrnis	12	(0)
2018	Fastav Zlín	6	(0)
2018	Logroñés	3	(0)
2019	Salamanca	0	(0)
2019–2020	Alcorcón	0	(0)
2019–2020	→ SS Reyes (loan)	19	(0)
2020	→ Algeciras (loan)	7	(0)
2020–2021	Sedan	1	(0)
2021	Alzira		
2022	UE Santa Coloma	9	(1)
2023	Gloria Ultra		
2024	Patacona	1	(0)

International career^{‡}
2013	DR Congo U20	3	(0)
2017–	DR Congo	1	(0)
- * Club domestic league appearances and goals as of 2 March 2024 ‡ National team caps and goals as of 26 March 2017

Jonathan Kabasele Bijimine (born 9 July 1994) is a footballer who plays as a defender or a midfielder. Born in France, he plays for DR Congo national team at international level.

== Club career ==
Born in Amiens to Congolese parents, Bijimine graduated with CS Sedan Ardennes' youth setup, and made his senior debuts with the reserves in the 2012–13 campaign, in CFA 2. On 19 October 2012 he played his first match as a professional, coming on as a second-half substitute in a 4–2 home success against AC Arles-Avignon for the Ligue 2 championship.

Bijimine appeared in 14 matches for the first team during the season (seven starts, 690 minutes of action), as his side were relegated. On 23 July 2013 he signed a three-year deal with Italian Lega Pro Prima Divisione side A.C. Perugia Calcio.

On 31 January 2014, after appearing rarely for Perugia, Bijimine was loaned to S.S. Barletta Calcio until June. On 3 September he moved teams and countries again, joining Spanish side Córdoba CF, and being assigned to the reserves in Segunda División B.

On 23 May 2015 Bijimine made his La Liga debut, coming on as a second-half substitute for Fede Vico in a 0–3 away loss against SD Eibar, as the Andalusians were already relegated. On 1 July of the following year, he signed a new three-year contract with the Verdiblancos and was definitely promoted to the main squad.

Bijimine became a regular starter under José Luis Oltra and Luis Carrión, but after being tested positive in a blood alcohol test following a car accident on 7 February 2017, he was only rarely used. On 20 July, he cut ties with the club.

On 15 March 2019, after spells with FC Fastav Zlín and UD Logroñés, Bijimine joined Segunda División B side Salamanca CF; seven days later, however, the club stated that he could not play due to being already registered to a French amateur club near his hometown.

On 6 August 2019, Bijimine joined fellow third division side UD San Sebastián de los Reyes, on loan from AD Alcorcón. The following 21 January, he moved to fellow league team Algeciras CF also in a temporary deal.

== International career ==
After representing DR Congo at under-20 level, Bijimine was included in Florent Ibenge's 31-man squad ahead of 2017 Africa Cup of Nations on 23 December 2016, but was later cut from the final list. He made his full international debut with the main squad the following 26 March, replacing Wilson Kamavuaka in 1–2 friendly loss at Kenya.

== Career statistics ==
As of match played 8 January 2018

Appearances and goals by club, season and competition
Club	Season	League			National Cup		League Cup		Other		Total	
Club	Season	Division	Apps	Goals	Apps	Goals	Apps	Goals	Apps	Goals	Apps	Goals
Sedan II	2012–13	CFA 2	10	2	—		—		—		10	2
Sedan	2012–13	Ligue 2	14	0	0	0	0	0	—		14	0
Perugia	2013–14	Lega Pro Prima Divisione	0	0	1	0	—		—		1	0
Barletta	2013–14	Lega Pro Prima Divisione	6	0	—		—		—		6	0
Córdoba II	2014–15	Segunda División B	29	6	—		—		—		29	6
Córdoba	2014–15	La Liga	1	0	0	0	—		—		1	0
Córdoba	2015–16	Segunda División	8	0	0	0	—		—		8	0
Córdoba	2016–17	Segunda División	20	0	4	0	—		—		24	0
Córdoba	Total		29	0	4	0	—		0	0	33	0
Apollon Smyrnis	2017–18	Super League Greece	12	0	1	0	—		—		13	0
Career total			100	8	6	0	0	0	0	0	106	8
