= Patrick Ekeng =

Cameroonian footballer (1990–2016)

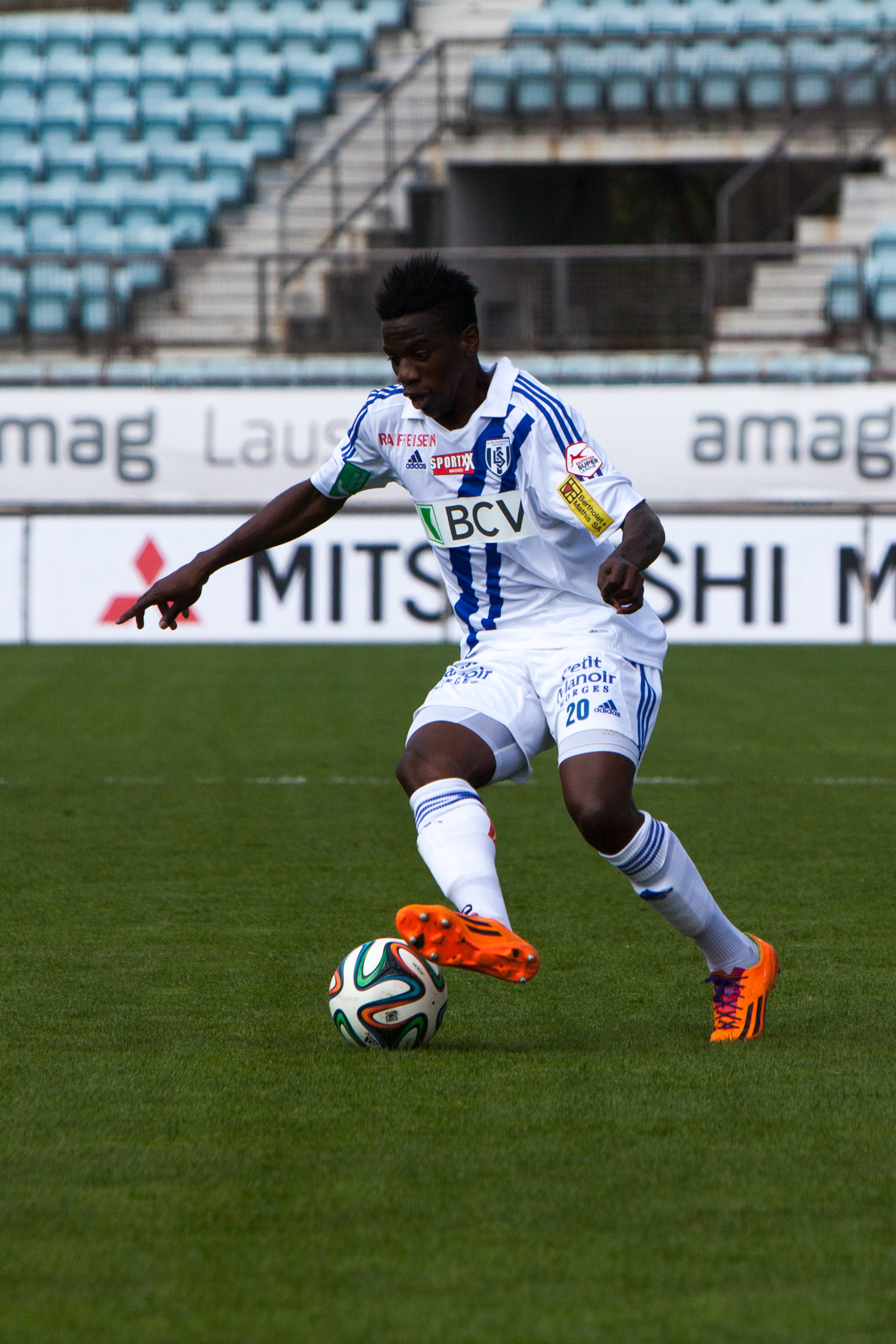
- Ekeng playing for Lausanne-Sport in 2014

Personal information
- Full name: Patrick Claude Ekeng Ekeng
- Date of birth: 26 March 1990
- Place of birth: Yaoundé, Cameroon
- Date of death: 6 May 2016 (aged 26)
- Place of death: Bucharest, Romania
- Height: 1.80 m (5 ft 11 in)
- Position: Defensive midfielder

Youth career
- 2006–2008: Canon Yaoundé

Senior career*
Years	Team	Apps	(Gls)
2008–2009	Canon Yaoundé	29	(7)
2009–2013	Le Mans	35	(1)
2011	→ Rodez (loan)	13	(0)
2013–2014	Lausanne-Sport	28	(2)
2014–2016	Córdoba	14	(1)
2016	Dinamo București	10	(1)
Total		129	(12)

International career
2009–2010	Cameroon U20	10	(1)
2015–2016	Cameroon	2	(0)
- * Club domestic league appearances and goals

Patrick Claude Ekeng Ekeng (26 March 1990 – 6 May 2016) was a Cameroonian professional footballer who played as a defensive midfielder. He had two international caps for his country's national team, whom he represented at the 2015 Africa Cup of Nations.

After starting at Canon Yaoundé and spending time on the fringes of France's Le Mans, he had brief spells in Switzerland, Spain, and Romania, where he died after collapsing in a match for Dinamo București.

== Club career ==
Born in Yaoundé, Ekeng joined Canon Yaoundé's youth setup in 2006, aged 16, and made his senior debuts with the club's main squad in 2008. On 4 July 2009, he signed a three-year deal with Le Mans FC, and was initially assigned to the reserve squad in the Championnat de France Amateur.

Ekeng played his first match as a professional on 20 August 2010, coming on as a second-half substitute in a 0–2 home loss against LB Châteauroux for the Ligue 2 championship.

On 14 January 2011, Ekeng joined Championnat National side Rodez AF on loan until June. He featured regularly as his side was eventually relegated.

Ekeng returned to Le Mans in June, and appeared regularly for the side in the following two campaigns, the second finishing in relegation. He left the club on 8 July 2013, and signed a two-year deal with FC Lausanne-Sport on the same day.

On 14 July 2014, Ekeng signed a two-year deal with newly promoted side Córdoba CF. He made his La Liga debut on 30 August, replacing Aritz López Garai in the 74th minute of a 1–1 home draw against Celta de Vigo.

Ekeng scored his first goal in the main category of Spanish football on 3 October, netting the first of a 1–1 away draw against Getafe CF. On 31 August of the following year, after suffering relegation in last place, he rescinded his contract.

He again moved to another country, signing for Romania's FC Dinamo București on 11 January 2016. Ekeng played 12 official games for the Câinii roșii, scoring his only goal on 20 April in the second leg of the semi-finals of that season's Cupa României, equalising in a 2–2 draw away to Eternal derby rivals FC Steaua București; Dinamo advanced to the final on away goals.

== International career ==
Ekeng appeared with Cameroon under-20 in the 2009 African Youth Championship, as his side finished second after losing to Ghana by 2–0. He also played in that year's FIFA U-20 World Cup, as Les Lions failed to qualify from the group stage.

On 7 January 2015, Ekeng made his full squad debut, coming on as a 57th-minute substitute for Franck Kom in a 1–1 friendly draw against DR Congo in his hometown's Stade Ahmadou Ahidjo. Two days later, he was included in Volker Finke's 23-men list for the 2015 Africa Cup of Nations, but took no part in the Indomitable Lions' group stage elimination.

== Death ==
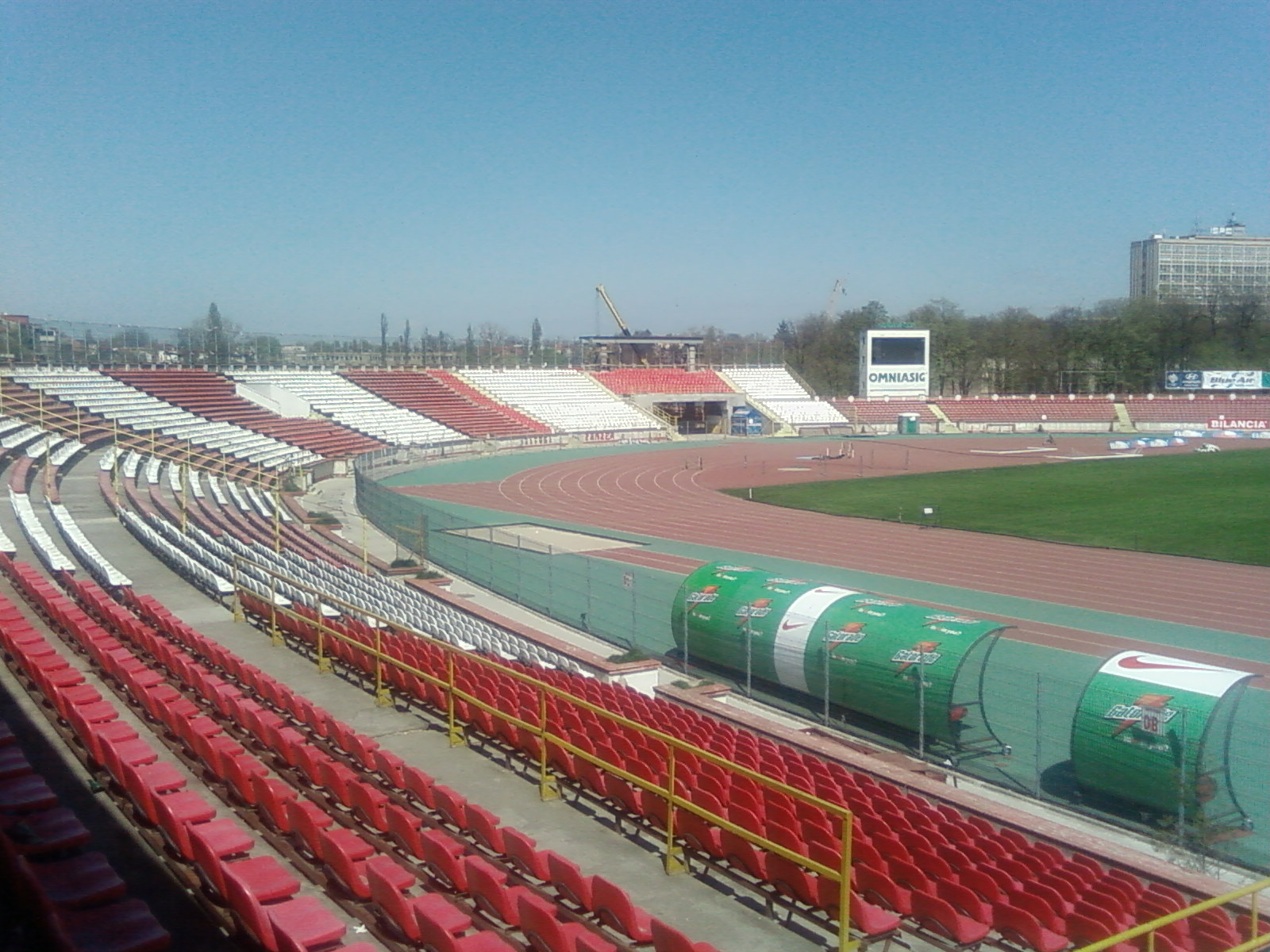
Ekeng collapsed and died during a match at Stadionul Dinamo

On 6 May 2016, Ekeng came on as a second-half substitute in a televised match against Viitorul Constanța. He had been fatigued that day, and had told his best friend that he did not want to play. Seven minutes after his entrance, with his team leading 3–2, he collapsed. He was transported and resuscitated at the hospital, and within two hours the medical staff confirmed that he had died. The cause of death was a suspected heart attack. He was 26 years old. Nine days after his death, his funeral was held in his hometown, attended by past and present Cameroonian internationals and the nation's sports minister; Ekeng's brother said at the ceremony that he was comforted by his having led a selfless life.

After Ekeng's death, all matches in Romania that weekend were postponed, and Dinamo's cup final against CFR Cluj was moved a week later than scheduled. The club pledged that if they won the cup, the trophy would be brought to Cameroon and placed on Ekeng's grave. Before the final, 50,000 Dinamo fans made a display in honour of Ekeng, including a giant fabric image of him.

=== Investigation ===
An inquiry by the Romanian interior ministry found that the ambulance which transported Ekeng had faulty equipment and expired medicine; the private company Puls had its licence suspended for 30 days and was fined 23,800 Romanian lei. Since the death of Nigerian Henry Chinonso Ihelewere in 2012, Romania's footballers' union had lobbied for every game to have an available equipped ambulance. The global union for players of the sport, FIFPro, said it reflected a history of cutting corners on footballers' safety in Romania.

Prosecutors opened an inquiry into Ekeng's death, due to reports of professional neglect having contributed to his fate. In late June, Dr Elena Duta was charged with manslaughter on reports that she did not attempt to resuscitate Ekeng in the ambulance. Her trial began in November 2018. In June 2020, she was sentenced to an 18-month suspended sentence, €200,000 fine and 60 days of community service.

== See also ==
- List of association footballers who died while playing
