= Estadio Nuevo Arcángel =

Stadium in Córdoba, Spain

Estadio El Arcángel
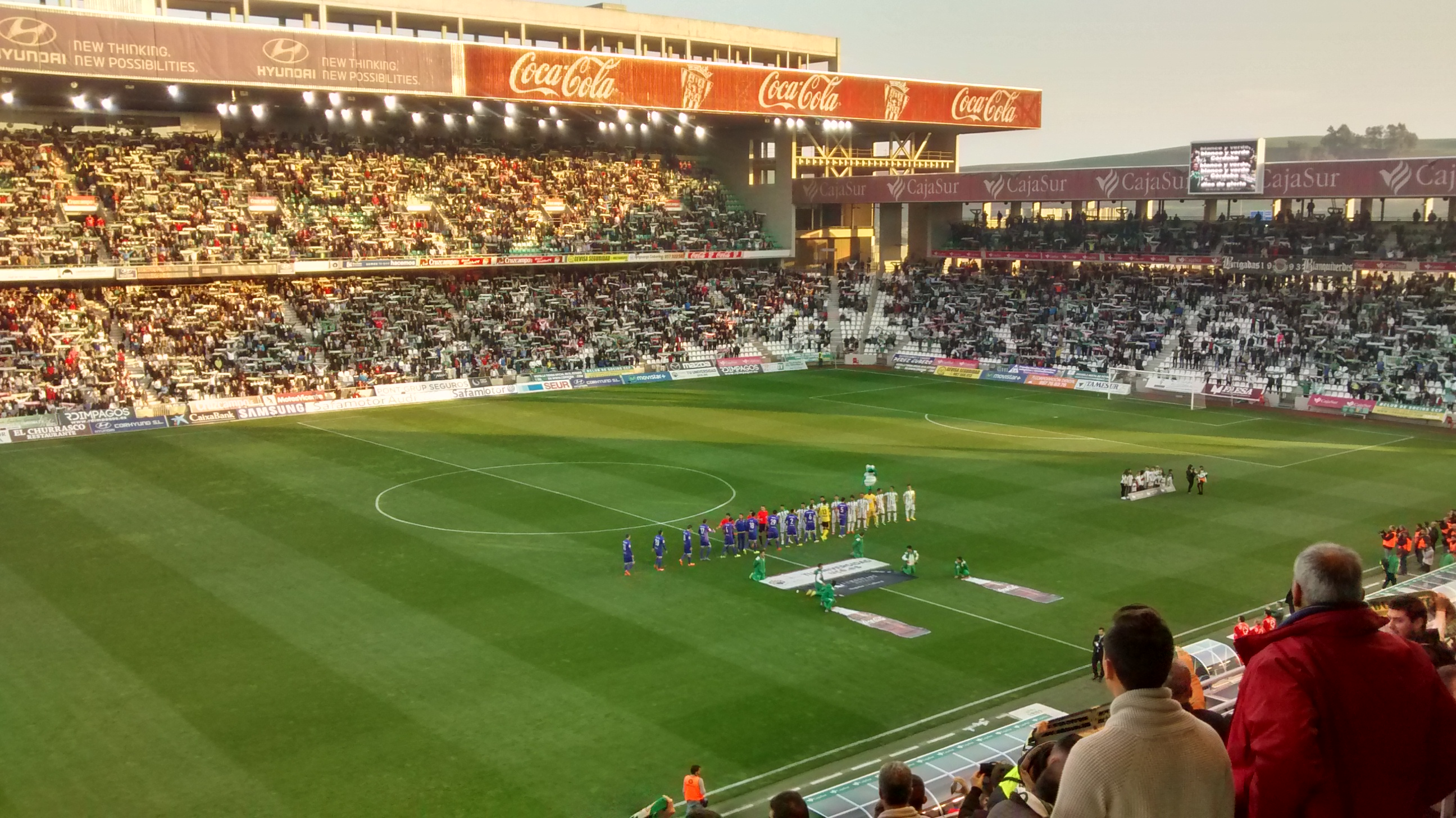
- Interactive map of Estadio El Arcángel
- Location: Córdoba, Andalusia, Spain
- Coordinates: 37°52′20″N 4°45′53″W
- Owner: Ayuntamiento de Córdoba
- Operator: Córdoba CF
- Capacity: 20,989
- Record attendance: 21,495 (Córdoba v Real Madrid, 24 January 2015)
- Field size: 105 metres (115 yd) x 70 metres (77 yd)

Construction
- Opened: 7 November 1993

Tenants
- Córdoba CF (1993–present); Spain national football team (selected matches)

Estadio El Arcángel (officially known as the Estadio Bahrain Victorious Nuevo Arcángel de Córdoba for sponsorship reasons) is a municipally owned multi-use stadium in Córdoba, Spain. It is operated by football club Córdoba CF as their home turf through a 50-year lease.

Originally the stadium had 15,425 seats and was roughly oval shaped, with an athletics track between the pitch and the stands.

Since 2004 the stadium has undergone a remodelling to convert it into a pure football stadium. Three of the four sides of the original ground were demolished and the pitch was moved to be closer to the west stand, removing the gap from the previous athletics track. The other three sides were rebuilt, starting with the east stand, which became a two-tiered structure with a large eight-story office building behind it that remains unfinished and empty as of 2017. The north and then south stands were subsequently rebuilt, also with two tiers, though to a much lower height in the second tier than the east stand.

As of 2017, it is unclear if the original west stand will be rebuilt.

On 10 February 2025, Bahrain Victorious purchased the naming rights to the stadium.

On 25 April 2001, it hosted the Spain national football team in a 1–0 victory over Japan.

== Gallery ==
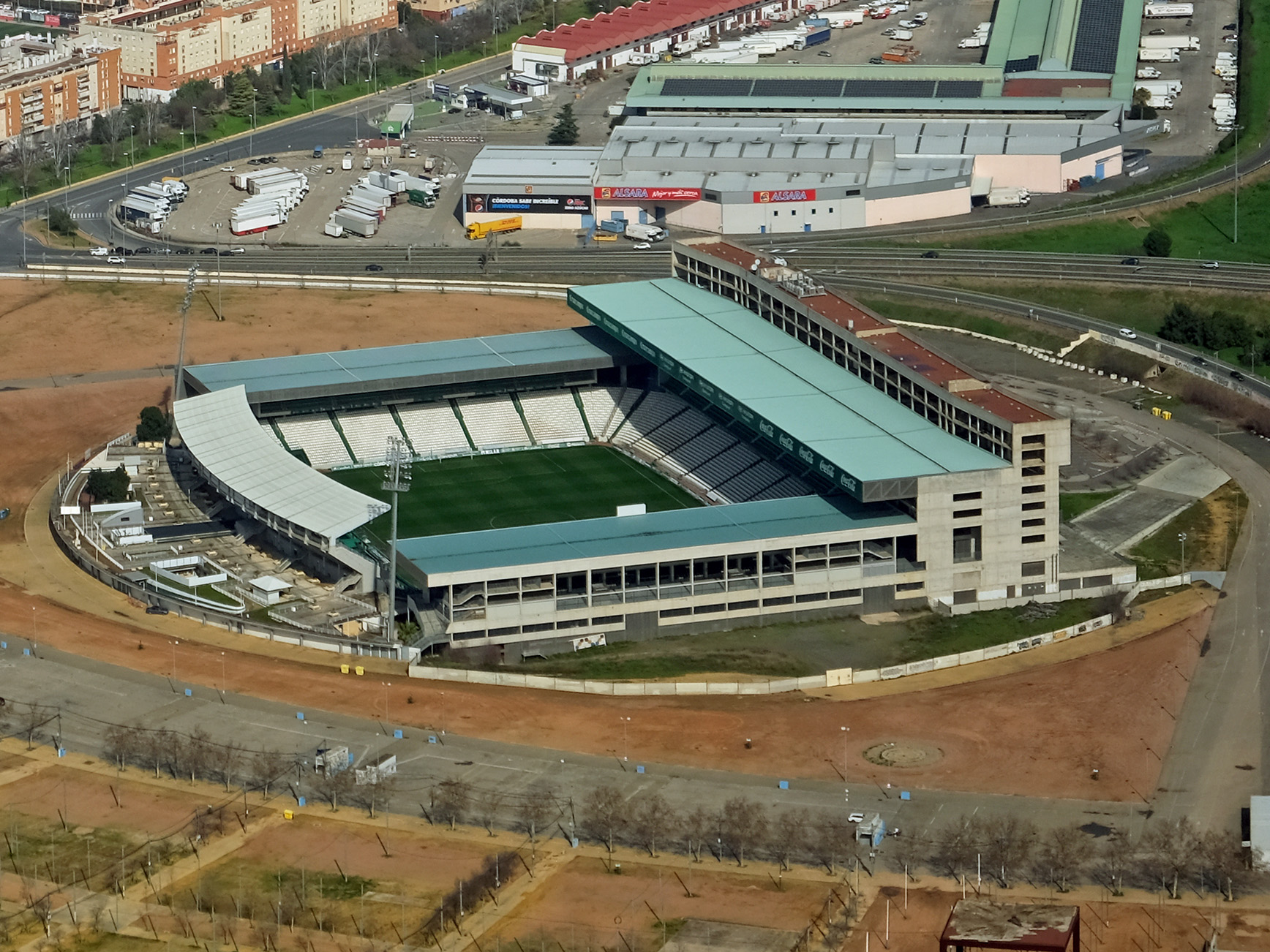
Bird's eye view

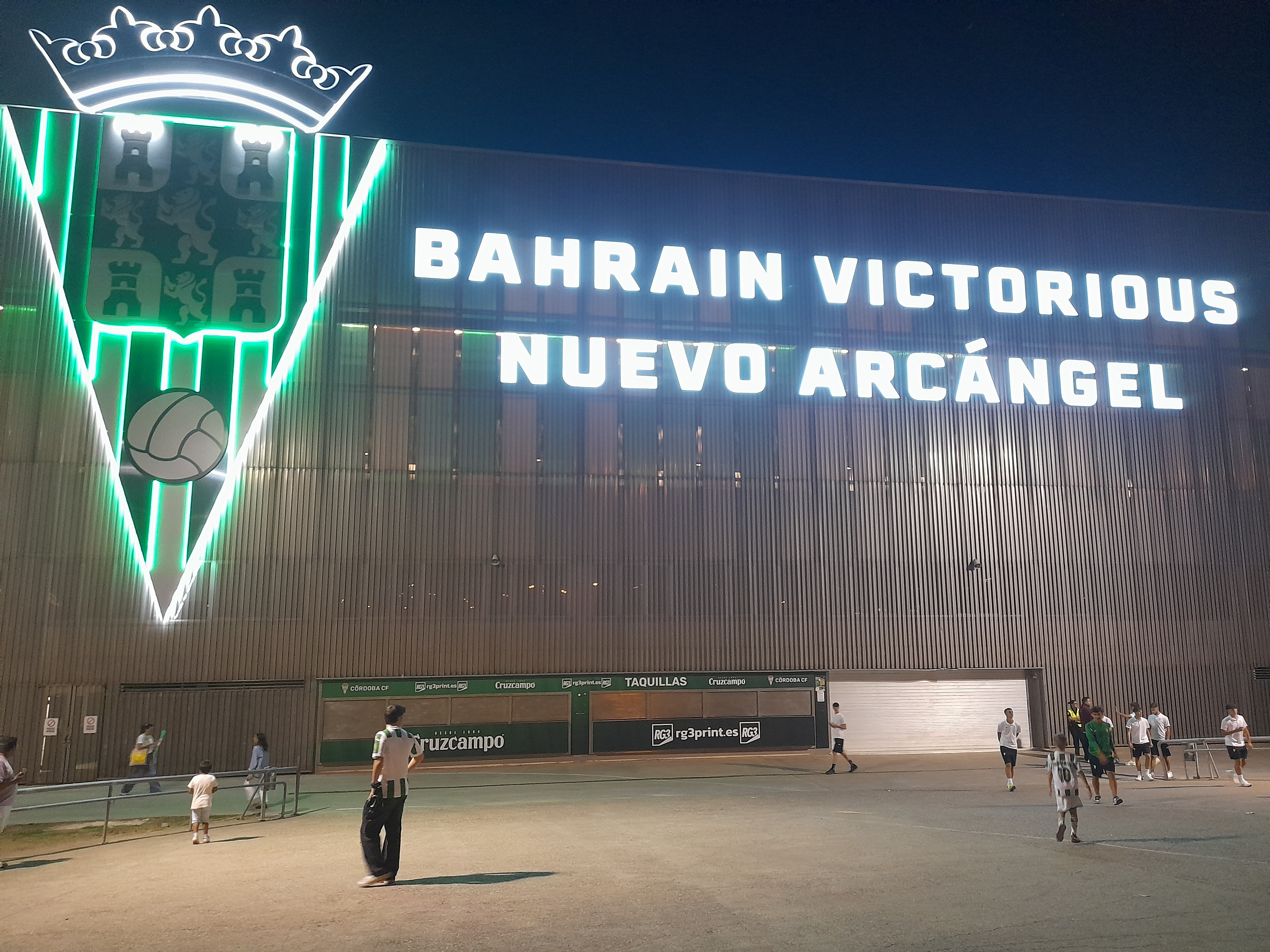
Stadium exterior, October 2025

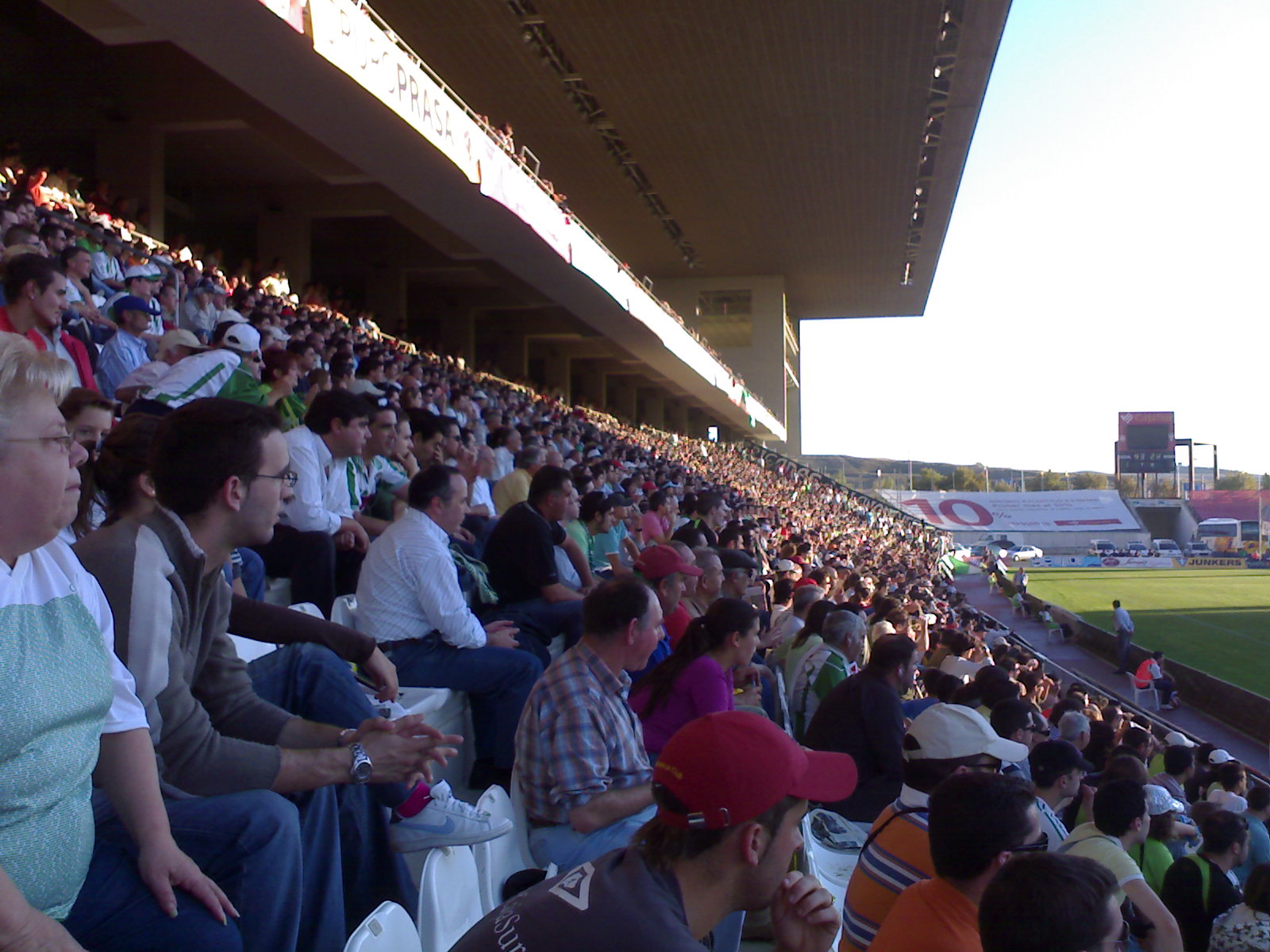
View of the crowd

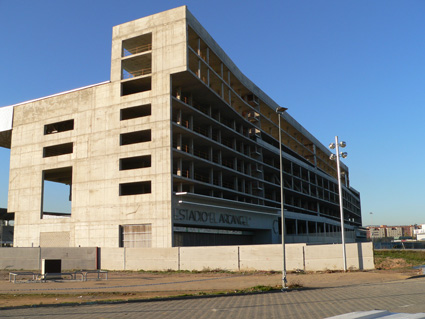
Stadium exterior, 2005
