= Aleksandar Pantić (footballer, born 1992) =

Serbian footballer

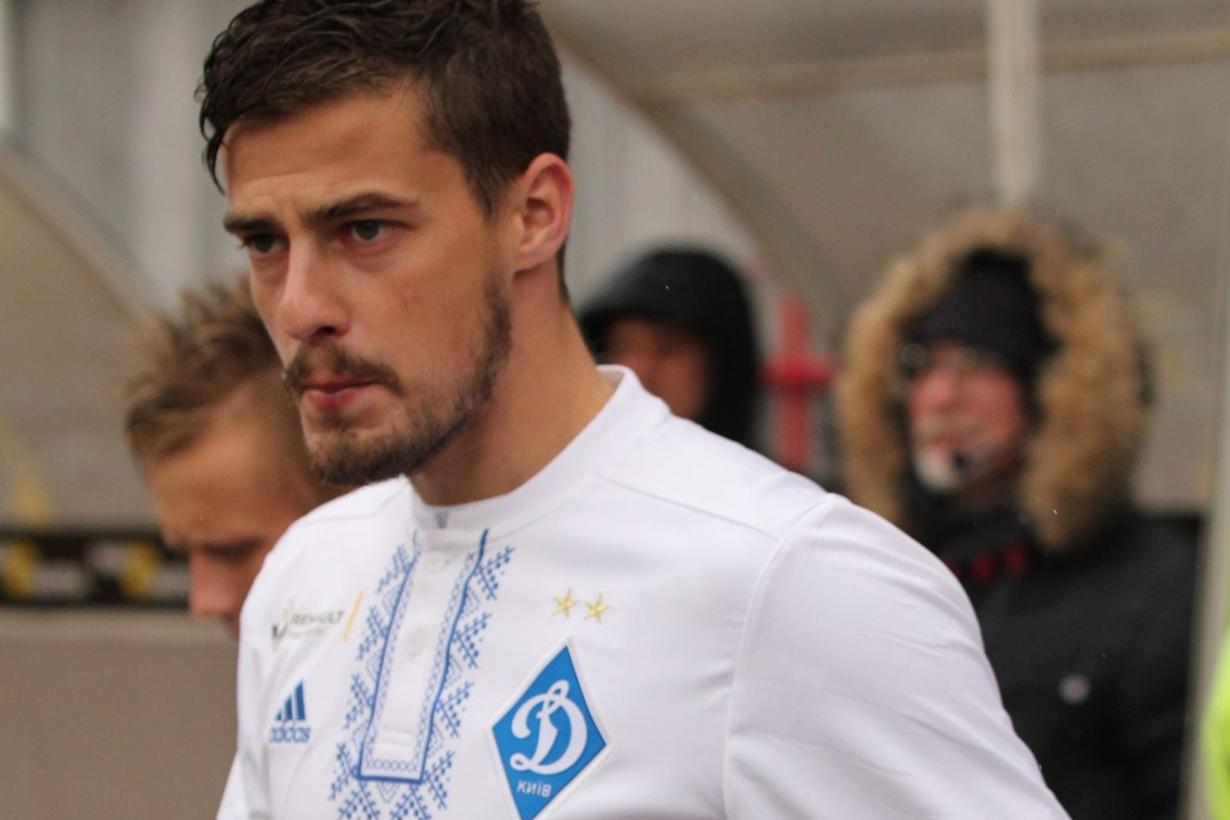

Personal information
- Full name: Aleksandar Pantić
- Date of birth: 11 April 1992 (age 34)
- Place of birth: Aranđelovac, SFR Yugoslavia
- Height: 1.84 m (6 ft 0 in)
- Position: Centre-back

Team information
- Current team: Rad

Youth career
- Partizan

Senior career*
Years	Team	Apps	(Gls)
2010–2012	Rad	26	(0)
2012–2013	Red Star Belgrade	13	(1)
2013–2017	Villarreal	9	(0)
2014–2015	→ Córdoba (loan)	29	(0)
2015–2016	→ Eibar (loan)	20	(0)
2016–2017	→ Alavés (loan)	2	(0)
2017–2019	Dynamo Kyiv	15	(0)
2019	→ Cádiz (loan)	0	(0)
2020–2021	Doxa Katokopias	16	(0)
2021	→ AEL Limassol (loan)	10	(0)
2021	Zagłębie Lubin	9	(0)
2023	Lugo	10	(0)
2023	Doxa Katokopias	7	(0)
2024	East Bengal	8	(0)
2025–	Rad	15	(2)

International career
2011	Serbia U19	4	(0)
2012–2015	Serbia U21	19	(1)
- * Club domestic league appearances and goals as of 15 July 2026

Aleksandar Pantić (Serbian Cyrillic: Александар Пантић; born 11 April 1992) is a Serbian professional footballer who plays as a centre-back for Rad.

== Club career ==
=== Rad ===
Pantić made his professional debut for Rad on 29 May 2011, in a Serbian SuperLiga match versus Javor Ivanjica.

=== Red Star Belgrade ===
In the final hours of 2012 summer transfer window, on 31 August 2012, Pantić signed a one-year contract for Serbian powerhouse Red Star Belgrade. He appeared in 13 matches during his only campaign and also scoring his first professional goal, in a 7–2 home routing over BSK Borča.

=== Villarreal ===
On 7 July 2013 Pantić signed a three-year deal with La Liga side Villarreal CF. He made his debut in the competition on 6 January of the following year, coming on as a second-half substitute in a 5–2 routing at Rayo Vallecano.

On 1 August 2014 Pantić joined fellow league team Córdoba CF in a season-long loan. On 20 August of the following year he moved to SD Eibar also in the top division, on loan for one year.

On 4 August 2016, Pantić was again loaned to another club in the Spanish top tier, Deportivo Alavés.

=== Dynamo Kyiv ===
On 1 February 2017, Pantić signed for Ukrainian club FC Dynamo Kyiv. On 30 January 2019, he returned to Spain after agreeing to a six-month loan deal with Cádiz CF in Segunda División.

On 2 September 2019, Dynamo Kyiv and Pantić mutually agreed to terminate his contract, making him a free agent.

=== Doxa Katokopias ===
On 6 August 2020, after nearly one year without a club, Pantić joined Doxa Katokopias FC in Cyprus. He was loaned to fellow league team AEL Limassol the following 2 February.

=== Zagłębie Lubin ===
On 23 September 2021, Pantić switched teams and countries again after signing for Ekstraklasa side Zagłębie Lubin. He left the club during the winter transfer window.

=== Lugo ===
On 15 November 2022, free agent Pantić joined CD Lugo on a trial basis. On 2 January of the following year, he signed a contract with the club until the end of the season.

== International career ==
Pantić was a member of the Serbia under-21 team between 2012 and 2015. He made his debut on 5 June 2012 against the Faroe Islands.

== Career statistics ==
As of 6 November 2018

Appearances and goals by club, season and competition
Club	Season	League			National cup		Continental		Total	
Club	Season	Division	Apps	Goals	Apps	Goals	Apps	Goals	Apps	Goals
Rad	2010–11	Serbian SuperLiga	5	0	0	0	—		5	0
Rad	2011–12	Serbian SuperLiga	19	0	1	0	3	0	23	0
Rad	2012–13	Serbian SuperLiga	2	0	0	0	—		2	0
Rad	Total		26	0	1	0	3	0	30	0
Red Star	2012–13	Serbian SuperLiga	13	1	2	0	0	0	15	1
Villarreal	2013–14	La Liga	9	0	4	0	0	0	13	0
Córdoba (loan)	2014–15	La Liga	29	0	2	0	—		31	0
Eibar (loan)	2015–16	La Liga	20	0	3	0	—		23	0
Alavés (loan)	2016–17	La Liga	2	0	4	0	—		6	0
Dynamo Kyiv	2016–17	Ukrainian Premier League	13	0	2	0	0	0	15	0
Dynamo Kyiv	2017–18	Ukrainian Premier League	2	0	2	0	1	0	5	0
Dynamo Kyiv	2018–19	Ukrainian Premier League	0	0	0	0	0	0	0	0
Dynamo Kyiv	Total		15	0	4	0	1	0	20	0
Career total			114	1	20	0	4	0	138	1
