= Ali Al-Hosani =

Emirati footballer (born 1988)

Personal information
- Full name: Ali Moahammed Al-Hosani
- Date of birth: 26 May 1988 (age 38)
- Place of birth: United Arab Emirates
- Height: 1.78 m (5 ft 10 in)
- Position: Goalkeeper

Team information
- Current team: Ajman Club
- Number: 81

Youth career
- Al-Wahda

Senior career*
Years	Team	Apps	(Gls)
2008–2017	Al-Wahda	39	(0)
2017–	Ajman Club	54	(0)
- * Club domestic league appearances and goals

Ali Al-Hosani (Arabic:علي الحوسني) (born 26 May 1988) is an Emirati footballer. He currently plays as a goalkeeper for Ajman Club .
