= Deivid (footballer, born 27 January 1989) =

Spanish association football player

Personal information
- Full name: David Omar Rodríguez Barrera
- Date of birth: 27 January 1989 (age 37)
- Place of birth: Las Palmas, Spain
- Height: 1.88 m (6 ft 2 in)
- Position: Centre-back

Youth career
- Las Palmas
- Unión Viera
- 2006–2007: Villarreal
- 2007–2008: Universidad LP

Senior career*
Years	Team	Apps	(Gls)
2008–2010	Universidad LP	71	(1)
2010–2012	Sevilla B	64	(5)
2012	Sevilla	5	(0)
2012–2014	Las Palmas	78	(0)
2014–2017	Córdoba	78	(0)
2017–2018	Valladolid	24	(1)
2018–2020	Las Palmas	15	(0)
2020	→ Nea Salamina (loan)	4	(0)
2020–2021	Atlético Paso	27	(1)
2022	Villa Santa Brígida	17	(0)
Total		383	(8)
- * Club domestic league appearances and goals

David Omar Rodríguez Barrera (born 27 January 1989), commonly known as Deivid, is a Spanish former footballer who played as a central defender.

== Club career ==
Born in Las Palmas, Canary Islands, Deivid came through the youth ranks at his hometown club UD Las Palmas, but made his professional debut with neighbouring Universidad de Las Palmas CF, playing two seasons in the Segunda División B. In July 2010 he joined Sevilla FC, being assigned to the reserves in the same league.

Deivid played his first match in La Liga on 2 April 2012, coming off the bench for Álvaro Negredo in the dying minutes of a 3–1 home win against RCD Mallorca. He added a further four first-team appearances, being released by the Andalusians at the end of the campaign as his contract was not renewed.

On 4 July 2012, Deivid signed a two-year contract with UD Las Palmas, returning to his native region. On 28 June 2014 he moved to Córdoba CF, newly promoted to the top tier.

On 12 July 2017, Deivid agreed to a two-year deal with Real Valladolid in the Segunda División. The following 1 July, after achieving promotion to the top flight (appearing in all but two matches early into the season but also missing several months in the final stretch due to a quadriceps injury), he returned to Las Palmas on a three-year contract.

Deivid was loaned to Nea Salamis Famagusta FC of the Cypriot First Division on 29 January 2020, for five months. He was subsequently released by his parent club.

In August 2020, Deivid signed with amateurs CD Atlético Paso. In late September 2021, following a street brawl involving himself and several of his teammates, the 32-year-old was fired.
