= Fausto Rossi (footballer) =

Italian footballer

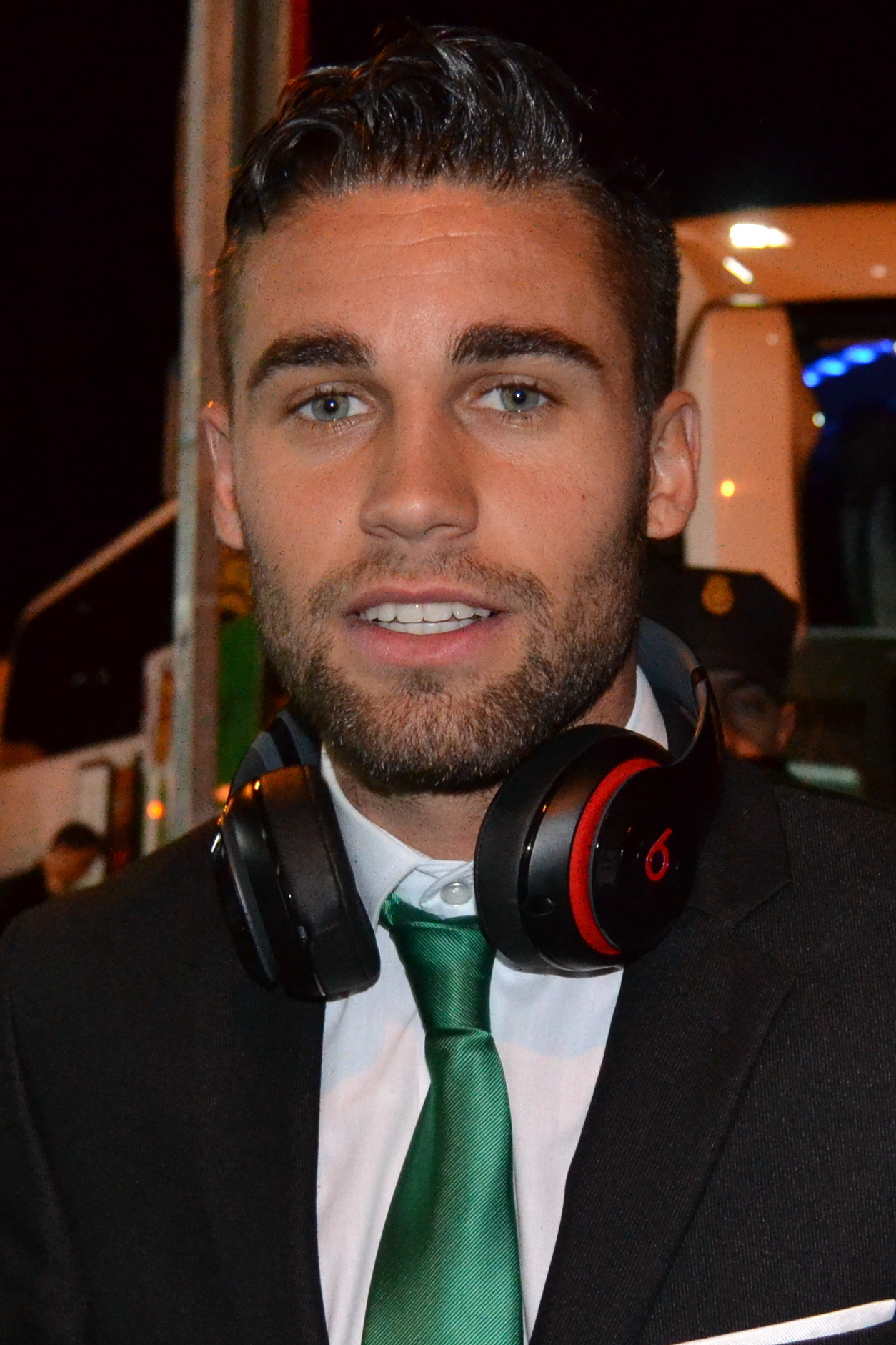
- Rossi in 2015

Personal information
- Date of birth: 3 December 1990 (age 35)
- Place of birth: Turin, Italy
- Height: 1.77 m (5 ft 10 in)
- Position: Central midfielder

Youth career
- 1999–2010: Juventus

Senior career*
Years	Team	Apps	(Gls)
2010–2012	Vicenza	24	(0)
2012–2016	Juventus	0	(0)
2012–2013	→ Brescia (loan)	44	(3)
2013–2014	→ Valladolid (loan)	31	(1)
2014–2015	→ Córdoba (loan)	24	(0)
2015–2016	→ Pro Vercelli (loan)	20	(1)
2017	Trapani	8	(0)
2017–2018	Universitatea Craiova	5	(0)
2019–2023	Reggiana	104	(0)
2023–2025	Vicenza	38	(1)

International career
2006–2007	Italy U17	2	(0)
2008–2009	Italy U20	4	(0)
2011–2013	Italy U21	25	(1)
Medal record
Men's Football
Representing Italy
Toulon Tournament
Third place	2011
UEFA European Under-21 Championship
Runner-up	2013 Israel
- * Club domestic league appearances and goals as of 25 April 2025

Fausto Rossi (Italian pronunciation: [ˈfausto ˈrossi]; born 3 December 1990) is an Italian professional footballer who plays as a central midfielder.

== Club career ==
=== Juventus ===
Born in Turin, Italy, Rossi joined the Juventus F.C. Youth Sector in 1999, at the age of 8. After progressing through the club's youth academy, Rossi joined the Primavera (Under-20) roster in 2008 and also began to earn senior call-ups during the 2008-09 Serie A campaign, under Claudio Ranieri. Rossi also helped the Primavera squad to win two consecutive Viareggio titles in 2009 and 2010.

=== Vicenza ===
After graduating the club's youth system, Rossi was sent out to Serie B side, Vicenza Calcio in a co-ownership deal on 22 July 2010 in order to gain regular first team experience. The 50% registration rights for the player were valued at €500,000. In the same negotiation, Juventus signed Niko Bianconi from Vicenza, also on a co-ownership deal also valued at €500,000. (both valued as €492,000 in Juve's financial statements) Rossi went on to make 16 league appearances for the Serie B outfit in his debut season as a professional, and ultimately remained at the club for the 2011–12 Serie B season.

=== Juventus return, loans ===
On 30 January 2012, however, Rossi was re-purchased entirely by Juventus for €1.7 million in a 2 1/2-year contract, with Carlo Pinsoglio moving to Vicenza Calcio for €1.5 million in co-ownership as part of the deal. After returning to Juventus, Rossi was immediately loaned out to Brescia Calcio. With the outfit, Rossi scored 3 goals in 12 appearances for the club during the second half of the 2011–12 season. On 1 July 2012 he signed a new 4-year contract. Rossi's loan deal with Brescia was also renewed on 31 July and Rossi remained a key figure in Brescia's 6th-place finish in the 2012–13 Serie B season, which ultimately saw the club lose out to Livorno in the promotion play-off semi-finals.

Rossi returned to Juventus in June 2013, but signed a one-year loan deal with La Liga side Real Valladolid on 29 August. He scored his first goal on 8 March of the following year, netting the winner against FC Barcelona.

On 31 July 2014 Rossi transferred to newly promoted La Liga team Córdoba CF, also in a temporary deal.

On 31 August 2015 Rossi was swapped with Cristian Bunino of F.C. Pro Vercelli 1892, which Bunino returned to Juventus from loan.

=== Trapani ===
On 9 January 2017 signed a contract with Trapani Calcio until the end of season.

=== Reggiana ===
On 18 July 2019, he signed with a newly promoted Serie C club Reggiana.

=== Return to Vicenza ===
On 24 August 2023, Rossi returned to Vicenza and signed a two-year contract.

== International career ==
In 2006 Rossi earned his first call-up to represent his country for the Italy U-17 team. He went on to make 2 appearances for the side, before making 3 additional appearances for the Italy U-20 team between 2008 and 2009. Rossi really made his mark, however, with the Italy U-21 national team, where he was first called up to represent Italy at the 2011 Toulon Tournament, making his debut on 1 June 2011 in a 2–0 victory over the Ivory Coast. He has since been a regular for the side, making 24 appearances and scoring 1 goal. Rossi was a part of the roster that finished runner-up in the 2013 UEFA European Under-21 Football Championship in June 2013, where he was a starter alongside Marco Verratti in the centre of Italy's midfield.

== Honours ==
Universitatea Craiova

- Cupa României: 2017–18
- Supercupa României runner-up: 2018

Reggiana

- Serie C: 2022–23 (group B)
