= Fran Serrano =

Spanish footballer

Personal information
- Full name: Francisco José Serrano Santos
- Date of birth: 20 April 1995 (age 31)
- Place of birth: Córdoba, Spain
- Height: 1.89 m (6 ft 2 in)
- Position: Centre back

Team information
- Current team: Linense
- Number: 15

Youth career
- Córdoba

Senior career*
| Years | Team | Apps | (Gls) |
| 2012–2017 | Córdoba B | 96 | (5) |
| 2015 | Córdoba | 2 | (0) |
| 2017–2020 | Granada B | 66 | (0) |
| 2020–2021 | Algeciras | 16 | (0) |
| 2021–2022 | El Ejido | 24 | (0) |
| 2022–2023 | Melilla | 21 | (1) |
| 2023–2024 | Cacereño | 19 | (0) |
| 2024– | Linense | 7 | (0) |
- * Club domestic league appearances and goals as of 13 October 2024

Francisco 'Fran' José Serrano Santos (born 20 April 1995) is a Spanish footballer who plays for Linense as a central defender.

== Club career ==
Born in Córdoba, Andalusia, Serrano was a youth product of local Córdoba CF. He made his debuts as a senior with the reserves, representing the side in both Segunda División B and Tercera División.

Serrano made his first team – and La Liga – debut on 17 May 2015, coming on as a late substitute for Rene Krhin in a 1–2 home loss against Rayo Vallecano. He was handed his first start six days later, playing the full 90 minutes in a 0–3 away loss against SD Eibar.

On 10 July 2017 Serrano moved to another reserve team, Granada CF B in the third division.
