= Edu Campabadal =

Spanish footballer

Personal information
- Full name: Eduard Campabadal Clarós
- Date of birth: 26 January 1993 (age 33)
- Place of birth: Tarragona, Spain
- Height: 1.83 m (6 ft 0 in)
- Position: Right back

Team information
- Current team: Avilés
- Number: 20

Youth career
- 2006–2012: Barcelona
- 2012–2013: Wigan Athletic

Senior career*
Years	Team	Apps	(Gls)
2013	Wigan Athletic	1	(0)
2013	Córdoba B	5	(0)
2013–2015	Córdoba	31	(0)
2015–2017	Mallorca	60	(0)
2017–2022	Lugo	144	(1)
2023	Linares	11	(0)
2023	Alcoyano	16	(2)
2024	Atlético Baleares	16	(1)
2024–2025	Zamora	31	(2)
2025–	Avilés	32	(2)

International career
2009	Spain U16	2	(0)
2009–2010	Spain U17	13	(1)
2011	Spain U18	2	(0)
Medal record
Men's football
Representing Spain
UEFA European Under-17 Championship
Runner-up	2010 Liechtenstein
- * Club domestic league appearances and goals as of 9 June 2026

Eduard "Edu" Campabadal Clarós (born 26 January 1993) is a Spanish professional footballer who plays for Primera Federación club Avilés. Mainly a right back, he can also play as a central defender.

== Club career ==
=== Wigan Athletic ===
Born in Tarragona, Catalonia, Campabadal joined Wigan Athletic in July 2012 after being released by FC Barcelona. He made his debut for the first team on 19 May 2013 on the final day of the Premier League season in a 2–2 draw against Aston Villa.

=== Córdoba ===
On 21 July 2013, Campabadal signed a two-year deal with Córdoba CF in Segunda División, being initially assigned to the reserves in Segunda División B. He made his first-team debut on 8 December, starting in a 1–2 away loss against Real Zaragoza.

Campabadal appeared in 17 matches during the 2013–14 season, as the Andalusians returned to La Liga after a 42-year absence. On 12 September 2014 he made his debut in the competition, starting in a 1–1 away draw against UD Almería but being replaced in the 68th minute due to an injury.

=== Mallorca / Lugo ===
On 3 July 2015 Campabadal joined RCD Mallorca, after rescinding his contract with Córdoba. On 6 July 2017, after suffering relegation, he signed a two-year deal with CD Lugo.

=== Zamora ===
On 12 July 2024, Campadabal signed with Zamora in Primera Federación.

== International career ==
Campabadal has played for the Spain U17 and Spain U18 national teams, and played in the final of the 2010 UEFA European Under-17 Football Championship.
