= 2006–07 Deportivo de La Coruña season =

Deportivo de La Coruña
2006–07 season
- President: Augusto César Lendoiro
- Manager: Joaquín Caparrós
- Stadium: Estadio Riazor
- La Liga: 13th
- Copa del Rey: Semi-finals
- Top goalscorer: League: Javier Arizmendi (5); All: Javier Arizmendi (5)

The 2006–07 season was Deportivo de La Coruña's 36th season in La Liga, the top division of Spanish football. They also competed in the Copa del Rey. The season covered the period 1 July 2006 to 30 June 2007.

== Season summary ==
Coach Joaquín Caparrós's second season in charge saw Deportivo slip into the bottom half of the table, placing 13th. This was their worst finish in La Liga since 1991–92, and ultimately cost Caparrós his job. Despite fairing somewhat better in the Copa del Rey, reaching the semi-finals for the second consecutive year before losing to eventual winners Sevilla, Caparrós was replaced by Real Sociedad coach Miguel Ángel Lotina ahead of the following season.

== Kit ==
Deportivo's kit was manufactured by Joma and sponsored by Fadesa.

== Players ==
=== Squad ===
Retrieved on 30 March 2021

Note: Flags indicate national team as defined under FIFA eligibility rules; some limited exceptions apply. Players may hold more than one non-FIFA nationality.

No.	Pos.	Nation	Player
1	GK	ISR	Dudu Aouate
2	DF	ESP	Manuel Pablo
3	MF	ESP	Pablo Álvarez
4	MF	ARG	Aldo Duscher
5	DF	ARG	Fabricio Coloccini
6	MF	CAN	Julian de Guzman
7	FW	EQG	Rodolfo Bodipo
8	MF	ESP	Sergio
9	FW	URU	Sebastián Taborda
10	FW	ESP	Javier Arizmendi
11	FW	ESP	Riki
12	FW	ESP	Adrián
13	GK	URU	Gustavo Munúa
14	DF	POR	Jorge Andrade
15	DF	ESP	Joan Capdevila

No.	Pos.	Nation	Player
16	MF	ESP	Juan Rodríguez
18	DF	ESP	Alberto Lopo
19	DF	ESP	Antonio Barragán
20	FW	ESP	Cristian
21	MF	ESP	Juan Carlos Valerón
22	DF	ESP	Juanma
23	FW	URU	Fabián Estoyanoff (on loan from Valencia)
24	MF	ESP	Joan Verdú
25	DF	BRA	Filipe Luís
26	MF	ESP	Iago Iglesias
30	GK	ESP	Fabri
32	DF	ESP	Piscu
33	MF	ESP	Iván Pérez
34	MF	ESP	Álex Bergantiños
35	FW	ESP	Rubén Rivera

==== Left club during season ====
Note: Flags indicate national team as defined under FIFA eligibility rules; some limited exceptions apply. Players may hold more than one non-FIFA nationality.

No. / Pos. / Nation / Player; — / DF / ESP / Álvaro Arbeloa (to Liverpool)	No. / Pos. / Nation / Player; — / DF / ESP / Rodri (on loan to Almería)

==== Out on loan for the full season ====
Note: Flags indicate national team as defined under FIFA eligibility rules; some limited exceptions apply. Players may hold more than one non-FIFA nationality.

No.	Pos.	Nation	Player
17	FW	ESP	Rubén Castro (on loan at Racing Santander/Gimnàstic de Tarragona)
36	FW	ESP	Xisco (on loan at Vecindario)
—	DF	ESP	Pablo Amo (on loan at Recreativo de Huelva)

No.	Pos.	Nation	Player
—	MF	ESP	Iván Carril (on loan at UD Vecindario/Palencia)
—	MF	ESP	Momo (on loan at Racing Santander)
—	MF	ESP	Antonio Tomás (on loan at Racing Santander)

=== Squad stats ===
Last updated on 30 March 2021.

No.	Pos	Nat	Player	Total		La Liga		Copa del Rey	
No.	Pos	Nat	Player	Apps	Goals	Apps	Goals	Apps	Goals
1	GK	(Israel) ISR	Dudu Aouate	40	0	38	0	2	0
2	DF	(Spain) ESP	Manuel Pablo	20	0	12+3	0	5	0
3	MF	(Spain) ESP	Pablo Álvarez	10	1	5+3	0	2	1
4	MF	(Argentina) ARG	Aldo Duscher	18	0	12+3	0	3	0
5	DF	(Argentina) ARG	Fabricio Coloccini	28	0	26	0	2	0
6	MF	(Canada) CAN	Julian de Guzman	23	0	17+3	0	2+1	0
7	FW	(Equatorial Guinea) EQG	Rodolfo Bodipo	8	2	2+5	2	0+1	0
8	MF	(Spain) ESP	Sergio	33	3	26+2	2	4+1	1
9	FW	(Uruguay) URU	Sebastián Taborda	20	3	2+13	2	4+1	1
10	FW	(Spain) ESP	Javier Arizmendi	36	5	32+1	5	3	0
11	FW	(Spain) ESP	Riki	37	3	29+4	3	1+3	0
12	FW	(Spain) ESP	Adrián	19	2	5+8	1	6	1
13	GK	(Uruguay) URU	Gustavo Munúa	6	0	0	0	6	0
14	DF	(Portugal) POR	Jorge Andrade	26	0	22	0	3+1	0
15	DF	(Spain) ESP	Joan Capdevila	38	4	34	4	4	0
16	MF	(Spain) ESP	Juan Rodríguez	37	4	22+9	4	6	0
18	DF	(Spain) ESP	Alberto Lopo	35	1	30+1	1	3+1	0
19	DF	(Spain) ESP	Antonio Barragán	22	2	11+5	2	5+1	0
20	FW	(Spain) ESP	Cristian	33	1	25+4	1	2+2	0
21	MF	(Spain) ESP	Juan Carlos Valerón	3	0	0+2	0	0+1	0
22	DF	(Spain) ESP	Juanma	14	1	7	0	7	1
23	FW	(Uruguay) URU	Fabián Estoyanoff	31	2	18+10	1	3	1
24	MF	(Spain) ESP	Joan Verdú	33	2	10+17	1	2+4	1
25	DF	(Brazil) BRA	Filipe Luís	26	1	10+9	0	6+1	1
26	MF	(Spain) ESP	Iago Iglesias	12	2	2+7	2	2+1	0
30	GK	(Spain) ESP	Fabri	0	0	0	0	0	0
32	DF	(Spain) ESP	Piscu	2	0	0	0	0+2	0
33	MF	(Spain) ESP	Iván Pérez	1	0	0	0	0+1	0
34	MF	(Spain) ESP	Álex Bergantiños	0	0	0	0	0	0
35	FW	(Spain) ESP	Rubén Rivera	3	1	1	0	0+2	1
Players who have left the club after the start of the season:
	DF	(Spain) ESP	Álvaro Arbeloa	21	0	20	0	1	0
	DF	(Spain) ESP	Rodri	5	0	0+1	0	4	0

== La Liga ==
Pos	Team	Pld	W	D	L	GF	GA	GD	Pts
11	Espanyol	38	12	13	13	46	53	−7	49 (Note: MLL 1–0 ESP; ESP 3–1 MLL)
12	Mallorca	38	14	7	17	41	47	−6	49
13	RC Deportivo	38	12	11	15	32	45	−13	47
14	Osasuna	38	13	7	18	51	49	+2	46
15	Levante	38	10	12	16	38	54	−16	42

Source: LFP
Rules for classification: 1st points; 2nd head-to-head points; 3rd head-to-head goal difference; 4th head-to-head goals scored; 5th goal difference; 6th number of goals scored; 7th Fair-play points

== See also ==
- 2006–07 La Liga
- 2006–07 Copa del Rey
