= 2007–08 Deportivo de La Coruña season =

Deportivo de La Coruña
2007–08 season
- President: Augusto César Lendoiro
- Manager: Miguel Ángel Lotina
- Stadium: Estadio Riazor
- La Liga: 9th
- Copa del Rey: Round of 32
- Top goalscorer: League: Xisco (9); All: Xisco (9)

The 2007–08 season was Deportivo de La Coruña's 37th season in La Liga, the top division of Spanish football. They also competed in the Copa del Rey. The season covered the period 1 July 2007 to 30 June 2008.

== Season summary ==
After a poor 2006–07 campaign, in which Deportivo finished 13th, coach Joaquín Caparrós was fired, and replaced by Real Sociedad's Miguel Ángel Lotina, who signed a one-year contract.

Lotina improved Depor's league form, and they ended the year in 9th, qualifying for the 2008 UEFA Intertoto Cup. However, they fell at the first hurdle in the Copa del Rey, being eliminated in the round of 32 by Espanyol.

== Kit ==
Deportivo's kit was manufactured by Canterbury of New Zealand and sponsored by Fadesa.

== Players ==
=== Squad ===
Retrieved on 27 March 2021

Note: Flags indicate national team as defined under FIFA eligibility rules; some limited exceptions apply. Players may hold more than one non-FIFA nationality.

No.	Pos.	Nation	Player
1	GK	ISR	Dudu Aouate
2	DF	ESP	Manuel Pablo
3	DF	BRA	Filipe Luís
5	DF	ARG	Fabricio Coloccini
6	MF	CAN	Julian de Guzman
7	DF	ESP	Alberto Lopo
7	FW	EQG	Rodolfo Bodipo
8	MF	ESP	Sergio
9	FW	URU	Sebastián Taborda
10	MF	ESP	Joan Verdú
11	FW	ESP	Riki
13	GK	URU	Gustavo Munúa
14	MF	SWE	Christian Wilhelmsson (on loan from FC Nantes)
15	DF	ESP	Laure
15	FW	ESP	Rubén Castro

No.	Pos.	Nation	Player
16	MF	ESP	Antonio Tomás
17	MF	ESP	Ángel Lafita (on loan from Real Zaragoza)
18	MF	MEX	Andrés Guardado
19	DF	ESP	Antonio Barragán
20	FW	ESP	Cristian
21	MF	ESP	Juan Carlos Valerón
22	MF	ESP	Juan Rodríguez
23	FW	ESP	Xisco
24	DF	ESP	Pablo Amo
28	DF	ESP	Piscu
29	DF	ESP	Chapi
30	GK	ESP	Fabri
35	FW	ESP	Rubén Rivera
—	MF	ESP	Iván Carril

==== Left club during season ====
Note: Flags indicate national team as defined under FIFA eligibility rules; some limited exceptions apply. Players may hold more than one non-FIFA nationality.

No.	Pos.	Nation	Player
12	FW	ESP	Adrián (on loan to Deportivo Alavés)
—	DF	ESP	Aythami (on loan to Xerez)

No.	Pos.	Nation	Player
—	MF	ESP	Pablo Álvarez (on loan to Racing Santander)

==== Out on loan for the full season ====
Note: Flags indicate national team as defined under FIFA eligibility rules; some limited exceptions apply. Players may hold more than one non-FIFA nationality.

No.	Pos.	Nation	Player
26	MF	ESP	Iago Iglesias (on loan at Elche)
—	DF	ESP	Rodri (on loan at Polideportivo Ejido)

No.	Pos.	Nation	Player
—	MF	ESP	Momo (on loan at Xerez)

=== Transfers ===
==== In ====
#	Pos	Player	From	Notes
Summer
15	FW	(Spain) Rubén Castro	(Spain) Gimnàstic de Tarragona	Loan return
16	MF	(Spain) Antonio Tomás	(Spain) Racing Santander	Loan return
17	MF	(Spain) Ángel Lafita	(Spain) Real Zaragoza	Loan
18	MF	(Mexico) Andrés Guardado	(Mexico) Atlas	€7 million
23	FW	(Spain) Xisco	(Spain) Vecindario	Loan return
24	DF	(Spain) Pablo Amo	(Spain) Recreativo de Huelva	Loan return
	DF	(Spain) Aythami	(Spain) Las Palmas	€600,000
	DF	(Spain) Rodri	(Spain) Almería	Loan return
	MF	(Spain) Iván Carril	(Spain) Palencia	Loan return
	MF	(Spain) Momo	(Spain) Racing Santander	Loan return
Winter
14	MF	(Sweden) Christian Wilhelmsson	(France) Nantes	Loan

==== Out ====
#	Pos	Player	From	Notes
Summer
4	MF	(Argentina) Aldo Duscher	(Spain) Racing Santander	Free
10	FW	(Spain) Javier Arizmendi	(Spain) Valencia	
14	DF	(Portugal) Jorge Andrade	(Italy) Juventus	€10 million
15	DF	(Spain) Joan Capdevila	(Spain) Villarreal	
22	DF	(Spain) Juanma	(Spain) Tenerife	
23	FW	(Uruguay) Fabián Estoyanoff	(Spain) Valencia	Loan return
26	MF	(Spain) Iago Iglesias	(Spain) Elche	Loan
	DF	(Spain) Rodri	(Spain) Polideportivo Ejido	Loan
	MF	(Spain) Momo	(Spain) Xerez	Loan
Winter
12	FW	(Spain) Adrián	(Spain) Deportivo Alavés	Loan
	DF	(Spain) Aythami	(Spain) Xerez	Loan
	MF	(Spain) Pablo Álvarez	(Spain) Racing Santander	Loan

=== Squad stats ===
Last updated on 29 March 2021.

No.	Pos	Nat	Player	Total		La Liga		Copa del Rey	
No.	Pos	Nat	Player	Apps	Goals	Apps	Goals	Apps	Goals
1	GK	(Israel) ISR	Dudu Aouate	28	0	28	0	0	0
2	DF	(Spain) ESP	Manuel Pablo	34	0	34	0	0	0
3	DF	(Brazil) BRA	Filipe Luís	35	1	32+1	1	2	0
5	DF	(Argentina) ARG	Fabricio Coloccini	39	4	38	4	1	0
6	MF	(Canada) CAN	Julian de Guzman	35	0	33+2	0	0	0
7	DF	(Spain) ESP	Alberto Lopo	21	1	21	1	0	0
7	FW	(Equatorial Guinea) EQG	Rodolfo Bodipo	21	1	7+12	1	1+1	0
8	MF	(Spain) ESP	Sergio	34	7	29+3	5	2	2
9	FW	(Uruguay) URU	Sebastián Taborda	16	2	3+13	2	0	0
10	MF	(Spain) ESP	Joan Verdú	25	1	16+8	1	0+1	0
11	FW	(Spain) ESP	Riki	34	5	8+24	5	2	0
13	GK	(Uruguay) URU	Gustavo Munúa	6	0	4	0	2	0
14	MF	(Sweden) SWE	Christian Wilhelmsson	15	1	13+2	1	0	0
15	DF	(Spain) ESP	Laure	1	0	1	0	0	0
15	FW	(Spain) ESP	Rubén Castro	9	1	2+5	1	0+2	0
16	MF	(Spain) ESP	Antonio Tomás	12	0	8+4	0	0	0
17	MF	(Spain) ESP	Ángel Lafita	26	3	18+6	3	2	0
18	MF	(Mexico) MEX	Andrés Guardado	27	5	22+4	5	0+1	0
19	DF	(Spain) ESP	Antonio Barragán	12	0	8+2	0	2	0
20	FW	(Spain) ESP	Cristian	16	1	7+7	1	2	0
21	MF	(Spain) ESP	Juan Carlos Valerón	5	0	0+5	0	0	0
22	MF	(Spain) ESP	Juan Rodríguez	28	1	18+8	1	2	0
23	FW	(Spain) ESP	Xisco	25	9	23+2	9	0	0
24	DF	(Spain) ESP	Pablo Amo	20	3	19	3	1	0
28	DF	(Spain) ESP	Piscu	16	0	15	0	1	0
29	DF	(Spain) ESP	Chapi	2	0	0+1	0	1	0
30	GK	(Spain) ESP	Fabri	6	0	6	0	0	0
35	FW	(Spain) ESP	Rubén Rivera	0	0	0	0	0	0
	MF	(Spain) ESP	Iván Carril	0	0	0	0	0	0
Players who have left the club after the start of the season:
12	FW	(Spain) ESP	Adrián	7	0	3+3	0	1	0
	DF	(Spain) ESP	Aythami	2	0	1	0	0+1	0
	DF	(Spain) ESP	Rodri	1	0	1	0	0	0
	MF	(Spain) ESP	Pablo Álvarez	1	0	0+1	0	0	0

== Season results ==
=== Pre-season ===
2 August 2007	Paços de Ferreira (Portugal)	2 – 1	Deportivo La Coruña	Paços de Ferreira, Portugal
				Stadium: Estádio da Mata Real

3 August 2007	Marítimo (Portugal)	0 – 1	Deportivo La Coruña	Funchal, Portugal
		Report	Taborda	Stadium: Estádio dos Barreiros

7 August 2007 Teresa Herrera; Trophy; Semi-final	Deportivo La Coruña	1 – 1 (W–L p)	(Italy) Atalanta	A Coruña, Spain
				Stadium: Estadio Riazor

9 August 2007 Teresa Herrera; Trophy; Final	Deportivo La Coruña	2 – 1	Real Madrid	A Coruña, Spain
	Riki 40' (yellow card) 58'; Verdú 48'	Report	47' Baptista	Stadium: Estadio Riazor; Attendance: 18,000; Referee: Julián Rodríguez Santiago

=== La Liga ===
==== League table ====
Pos	Team	Pld	W	D	L	GF	GA	GD	Pts	Qualification or relegation
7	Mallorca	38	15	14	9	69	54	+15	59	
8	Almería	38	14	10	14	42	45	−3	52 (Note: DEP 0–3 ALM; ALM 1–0 DEP)	
9	Deportivo La Coruña	38	15	7	16	46	47	−1	52	Qualification for the Intertoto Cup third round
10	Valencia	38	15	6	17	48	62	−14	51	Qualification for the UEFA Cup first round (Note: Valencia entered UEFA Cup as winners of 2007–08 Copa del Rey.)
11	Athletic Bilbao	38	13	11	14	40	43	−3	50	

Source: LFP
Rules for classification: 1st points; 2nd head-to-head points; 3rd head-to-head goal difference; 4th head-to-head goals scored; 5th goal difference; 6th number of goals scored; 7th Fair-play points

==== Positions by round ====
Team ╲ Round	1	2	3	4	5	6	7	8	9	10	11	12	13	14	15	16	17	18	19	20	21	22	23	24	25	26	27	28	29	30	31	32	33	34	35	36	37	38
Deportivo La Coruña	18	18	11	13	16	18	14	16	17	16	14	17	17	18	19	19	19	19	19	19	19	17	18	18	18	16	16	14	15	15	13	9	9	7	8	8	8	9

2008 UEFA Intertoto Cup Third round
Segunda División

==== Matches ====
26 August 2007 1	Deportivo La Coruña	0 – 3	Almería	A Coruña, Spain
18:00		Report	18' Negredo; 33' Soriano; 50' Crusat; (yellow card) Bruno; (yellow card) Jo. Ortiz	Stadium: Estadio Riazor; Attendance: 20,000; Referee: Francisco Ontanaya López-Astilleros

2 September 2007 2	Real Valladolid	2 – 2	Deportivo La Coruña	Valladolid, Spain
18:00	García Calvo 45'; Sisi 72'; Llorente (yellow card) 74'	Report	53' (yellow card) 22' Taborda; 77' Riki; (yellow card) 46' Guardado	Stadium: José Zorrilla; Attendance: 22,000; Referee: Antonio Rubinos Pérez

16 September 2007 3	Deportivo La Coruña	1 – 0	Real Betis	A Coruña, Spain
16:00	Guardado 8'; Riki (yellow card) 53'	Report	(yellow card) 56' Ilić; (yellow card) 62' Somoza; (yellow card) 63' Juanito	Stadium: Estadio Riazor; Attendance: 10,000; Referee: Eduardo Iturralde González

23 September 2007 4	Getafe	0 – 0	Deportivo La Coruña	Getafe, Spain
16:00	Albín (yellow card) 71'	Report	(yellow card) 31' Riki; (yellow card) 52' Barragán	Stadium: Coliseum Alfonso Pérez; Attendance: 8,000; Referee: Miguel Ayza Gámez

26 September 2007 5	Deportivo La Coruña	0 – 2	Recreativo de Huelva	A Coruña, Spain
19:00		Report	12' Martins; 47' Guerrero	Stadium: Estadio Riazor; Attendance: 15,000; Referee: Carlos Delgado Ferreiro

30 September 2007 6	Espanyol	1 – 0	Deportivo La Coruña	Barcelona, Spain
16:00	Tamudo 45'; Zabaleta (yellow card)	Report	(yellow card) 21' Lafita	Stadium: Estadi Olímpic Lluís Companys; Attendance: 21,550; Referee: Luis Medina Cantalejo

7 October 2007 7	Sevilla	0 – 1	Deportivo La Coruña	Seville, Spain
16:00	Boulahrouz (yellow card) 55'; Alves (yellow card); Escudé (yellow card); Keita (yellow card)	Report	72' Riki; (yellow card) 57' Piscu; (yellow card) 67' de Guzman	Stadium: Ramón Sánchez Pizjuán; Attendance: 38,000; Referee: César Muñiz Fernández

20 October 2007 8	Deportivo La Coruña	2 – 4	Valencia	A Coruña, Spain
19:00	Xisco 28'; Bodipo 87'; Pablo (yellow card); Rodríguez (yellow card)	Report	10' (pen.) Joaquín; 15' Baraja; 37', 73' Morientes; (yellow card) (yellow-red card) 90' Helguera	Stadium: Estadio Riazor; Attendance: 20,000; Referee: Javier Turienzo Álvarez

28 October 2007 9	Real Madrid	3 – 1	Deportivo La Coruña	Madrid, Spain
16:00	van Nistelrooy 7' (pen.); Raúl 78'; Robinho 89'; Salgado (yellow card) 48'; Guti (yellow card) 53'; Gago (yellow card) 76'; Sneijder (yellow card) 83'	Report	1' Xisco; (yellow card) 21' Rodríguez; (yellow card) 28' de Guzman; (yellow card) 75' Riki; (yellow card) (yellow-red card) 80' Sergio	Stadium: Santiago Bernabéu Stadium; Attendance: 70,000; Referee: Carlos Clos

31 October 2007 10	Deportivo La Coruña	1 – 1	Mallorca	A Coruña, Spain
19:00	Guardado 42' (pen.); Piscu (yellow card) 62'; Pablo (yellow card) 70'	Report	12' (yellow card) 90' Güiza; (yellow card) 24' Navarro; (red card) 40' Moyá; (yellow card) 68' Valero; (yellow card) 76' Lux; (yellow card) 80' Pereyra; (yellow card) 90' Varela	Stadium: Estadio Riazor; Attendance: 10,000; Referee: Rafael Ramírez Domínguez

4 November 2007 11	Real Murcia	0 – 2	Deportivo La Coruña	Murcia, Spain
16:00		Report	56' Xisco; 72' Guardado; (yellow card) 49' Pablo; (yellow card) 63' Cristian	Stadium: Estadio Nueva Condomina; Attendance: 25,000; Referee: Eduardo Iturralde González

11 November 2007 12	Deportivo La Coruña	0 – 1	Racing Santander	A Coruña, Spain
16:00	Luís (red card) 90'	Report	68' Tchité; (yellow card) 20' Serrano; (yellow card) 70' Pinillos; (yellow card) 82' Duscher	Stadium: Estadio Riazor; Attendance: 21,000; Referee: Miguel Pérez Lasa

25 November 2007 13	Athletic Bilbao	2 – 2	Deportivo La Coruña	Bilbao, Spain
16:00	Barragán 22' (o.g.); D. López 53' (yellow card) 12'; Ocio (yellow card) 31'; Yeste (yellow card) 61'	Report	62' (yellow card) 61' Riki; 89' Taborda; (yellow card) 16' Xisco; (yellow card) 63' Bodipo; (yellow card) 79' Coloccini; (yellow card) 90' de Guzman	Stadium: San Mamés; Attendance: 35,000; Referee: Julián Rodríguez Santiago

2 December 2007 14	Deportivo La Coruña	1 – 2	Osasuna	A Coruña, Spain
16:00	Castro 82'	Report	47' Plašil; 88' Dady; (yellow card) 72' Margairaz; (yellow card) 89' Elía	Stadium: Estadio Riazor; Attendance: 10,000; Referee: José Paradas Romero

9 December 2007 15	Barcelona	2 – 1	Deportivo La Coruña	Barcelona, Spain
20:00	Ronaldinho 40' (pen.); Xavi 71'; Deco (yellow card) 90'	Report	2' Cristian; (yellow card) 17' Guardado; (yellow card) 81' Piscu; (yellow card) 90' Sergio	Stadium: Camp Nou; Attendance: 57,759; Referee: David Fernández Borbalán

16 December 2007 16	Deportivo La Coruña	1 – 1	Real Zaragoza	A Coruña, Spain
16:00	Coloccini 53'; Chapi (yellow card) (yellow-red card) 88'	Report	17' (yellow card) 75' Milito; (yellow card) 43' Aimar; (yellow card) 58' Zapater; (yellow card) 90' Gabi	Stadium: Estadio Riazor; Attendance: 22,000; Referee: Alfonso Pérez

23 December 2007 17	Levante	0 – 1	Deportivo La Coruña	Valencia, Spain
16:00		Report	85' (pen.) Sergio	Stadium: Ciutat de València; Attendance: 8,000; Referee: Javier Turienzo Álvarez

6 January 2008 18	Deportivo La Coruña	0 – 3	Atlético Madrid	A Coruña, Spain
16:00	Barragán (yellow card) 25'; Lafita (yellow card) 59'	Report	39' Forlán; 52' Agüero; 64' Jurado; (yellow card) 33' Ibáñez	Stadium: Estadio Riazor; Attendance: 9,000; Referee: Fernando Teixeira Vitienes

13 January 2008 19	Villarreal	4 – 3	Deportivo La Coruña	Villarreal, Spain
16:00	Rossi 30' (pen.); Kahveci 66', 68' (yellow card) 44'; Tomasson 80' (pen.); Cazorla (yellow card) 77'	Report	27' (pen.) Sergio; 58' (red card) 79' Amo; 90' Guardado	Stadium: Estadio El Madrigal; Attendance: 18,000; Referee: José Paradas Romero

20 January 2008 20	Almería	1 – 0	Deportivo La Coruña	Almería, Spain
16:00	Pulido 88'; Soriano (yellow card) 32'	Report	(yellow card) 80' Fabri; (yellow card) 87' de Guzman; (yellow card) 90' Guardado	Stadium: Estadio de los Juegos Mediterráneos; Attendance: 15,000; Referee: Arturo Daudén Ibáñez

27 January 2008 21	Deportivo La Coruña	3 – 1	Real Valladolid	A Coruña, Spain
16:00	Lopo 8'; Xisco 47' (yellow card) 45'; Guardado 72'; Rodríguez (yellow card) 32'	Report	83' Víctor; (yellow card) (yellow-red card) 74' Asenjo	Stadium: Estadio Riazor; Attendance: 16,000; Referee: Carlos Velasco Carballo

2 February 2008 22	Real Betis	0 – 1	Deportivo La Coruña	Seville, Spain
21:00	Arzu (yellow card) 65'; Melli (yellow card) 67'; Edu (yellow card) 68'	Report	35' Amo; (penalty missed) 77' Rodríguez; (yellow card) 40' Fabri; (yellow card) 50' Tomás; (yellow card) 83' Luís; (yellow card) 89' Sergio	Stadium: Estadio Manuel Ruiz de Lopera; Attendance: 35,000; Referee: Francisco Ontanaya López-Astilleros

9 February 2008 23	Deportivo La Coruña	1 – 1	Getafe	A Coruña, Spain
19:00	Mario Abrante 43' (o.g.); Tomás (yellow card) 36'; Lopo (yellow card) 59'	Report	68' Uche; (yellow card) 59' Licht	Stadium: Estadio Riazor; Attendance: 19,000; Referee: Alberto Undiano

17 February 2008 24	Recreativo de Huelva	3 – 2	Deportivo La Coruña	Huelva, Spain
16:00	Beto 53' (yellow card) (yellow-red card) 54'; Sinama Pongolle 57' (yellow card) 9'; Cáceres 88' (yellow card) 18'; Zahínos (yellow card) 86'; Sorrentino (yellow card) 90'	Report	9' (pen.) Verdú; 81' (yellow card) 82' Riki; (yellow card) 12' Lopo; (yellow card) 80' Luís	Stadium: Nuevo Colombino; Attendance: 14,000; Referee: Alfonso Álvarez Izquierdo

24 February 2008 25	Deportivo La Coruña	2 – 0	Espanyol	A Coruña, Spain
16:00	Coloccini 17'; Lafita 24'; Lopo (yellow card) 69'; Sergio (yellow card) 76'; Wilhelmsson (yellow card) 81'	Report	(yellow card) 83' Rufete	Stadium: Estadio Riazor; Attendance: 23,000; Referee: Carlos Clos

1 March 2008 26	Deportivo La Coruña	2 – 1	Sevilla	A Coruña, Spain
19:00	Wilhelmsson 35' (pen.); Lafita 65' (yellow card) 67'; Amo (yellow card) 3'	Report	25' Kanouté; (yellow card) 63' Mosquera; (yellow card) 72' Maresca; (yellow card) 80' Fabiano; (yellow card) Lolo	Stadium: Estadio Riazor; Attendance: 12,000; Referee: César Muñiz Fernández

9 March 2008 27	Valencia	2 – 2	Deportivo La Coruña	Valencia, Spain
18:00	Mata 16' (yellow card) 20'; Villa 23'	Report	36' (yellow card) 63' Sergio; 44' Lafita; (yellow card) 80' Riki	Stadium: Mestalla Stadium; Attendance: 40,000; Referee: Carlos Delgado Ferreiro

15 March 2008 28	Deportivo La Coruña	1 – 0	Real Madrid	A Coruña, Spain
19:00	Pepe 57' (o.g.) de Guzman (yellow card) 59'; Coloccini (yellow card) 68'; Aouate (yellow card) 89'; Lopo (yellow card) 89'	Report	(yellow card) 71' Torres	Stadium: Estadio Riazor; Attendance: 35,000; Referee: Javier Turienzo Álvarez

22 March 2008 29	Mallorca	1 – 0	Deportivo La Coruña	Palma de Mallorca, Spain
19:00	Arango 22'; Ramis (yellow card) 49'; Varela (yellow card) 70'	Report	(yellow card) 18' Amo; (yellow card) 44' Pablo; (yellow card) 66' Luís; (yellow card) (yellow-red card) 90' Riki	Stadium: Ono Estadi; Attendance: 10,000; Referee: David Fernández Borbalán

30 March 2008 30	Deportivo La Coruña	3 – 1	Real Murcia	A Coruña, Spain
18:00	Xisco 22', 46', 48' (yellow card) 49'; Lopo (yellow card) 76'	Report	1' de Lucas; (yellow card) 71' Aquino; (yellow card) 78' Baiano	Stadium: Estadio Riazor; Attendance: 15,000; Referee: Antonio Rubinos Pérez

6 April 2008 31	Racing Santander	1 – 3	Deportivo La Coruña	Santander, Spain
16:00	López 37'; Serrano (yellow card) 53'; Oriol (yellow card) 53'; Bolado (yellow card) 83'; Smolarek (yellow card) 85'	Report	2', 43' Xisco; 25' Coloccini; (yellow card) 42' Lafita; (yellow card) 58' Amo; (yellow card) 90' de Guzman	Stadium: El Sardinero; Attendance: 18,900; Referee: Carlos Velasco Carballo

13 April 2008 32	Deportivo La Coruña	3 – 0	Athletic Bilbao	A Coruña, Spain
16:00	Coloccini 31'; Sergio 64' (pen.); Luís 79'; Lopo (yellow card) 48'; Pablo (yellow card) 70'; Riki (yellow card) 90'	Report	(yellow card) 20' Koikili; (yellow card) 74' Amorebieta	Stadium: Estadio Riazor; Attendance: 26,000; Referee: Arturo Daudén Ibáñez

20 April 2008 33	Osasuna	0 – 1	Deportivo La Coruña	Pamplona, Spain
16:00	Vela (yellow card) 42'; Cruchaga (yellow card) 64'	Report	64' (pen.) (yellow card) 47' Sergio; (yellow card) 59' Wilhelmsson; (yellow card) 68' de Guzman	Stadium: Reyno de Navarra; Attendance: 17,500; Referee: Rafael Ramírez Domínguez

26 April 2008 34	Deportivo La Coruña	2 – 0	Barcelona	A Coruña, Spain
19:00	Rodríguez 54'; Amo 76'; Lafita (yellow card) 81'	Report	(yellow card) 62' Sylvinho; (yellow card) 84' Márquez; (yellow card) 87' Edmílson; (yellow card) 88' Deco	Stadium: Estadio Riazor; Attendance: 34,600; Referee: Carlos Delgado Ferreiro

3 May 2008 35	Real Zaragoza	1 – 0	Deportivo La Coruña	Zaragoza, Spain
21:00	Ayala 90'; Zapater (yellow card) 56'; Fernández (yellow card) 68'; Óscar (yellow card) 85'; Celades (yellow card) 88'	Report	(yellow card) 90' de Guzman	Stadium: La Romareda; Attendance: 30,000; Referee: Fernando Teixeira Vitienes

7 May 2008 36	Deportivo La Coruña	1 – 0	Levante	A Coruña, Spain
19:00	Riki 88'	Report	(yellow card) 35' Robusté; (yellow card) 62' Gaspar; (yellow card) 85' Juanma	Stadium: Estadio Riazor; Attendance: 12,000; Referee: José Paradas Romero

11 May 2008 37	Atlético Madrid	1 – 0	Deportivo La Coruña	Madrid, Spain
20:00	Forlán 45'; Camacho (yellow card) 67'	Report	(yellow card) 68' Luís; (yellow card) 71' de Guzman	Stadium: Estadio Vicente Calderón; Attendance: 53,000; Referee: Rafael Ramírez Domínguez

18 May 2008 38	Deportivo La Coruña	0 – 2	Villarreal	A Coruña, Spain
20:00	Wilhelmsson (yellow card) 64'	Report	35' Fernández; 90' Franco; (yellow card) 51' Eguren; (yellow card) 74' Soriano (yellow card) 74'	Stadium: Estadio Riazor; Attendance: 17,000; Referee: Luis Medina Cantalejo

=== Copa del Rey ===
==== Round of 32 ====
19 December 2007 First leg	Espanyol	1 – 1	Deportivo La Coruña	Barcelona, Spain
19:45	Coro 85'; Jarque (yellow card) 25'; Riera (yellow card) 67'	Report	29' Sergio; (yellow card) 70' Barragán	Stadium: Estadi Olímpic Lluís Companys; Referee: Carlos Delgado Ferreiro

2 January 2008 Second leg	Deportivo La Coruña	1 – 2 (a.e.t.)	Espanyol	A Coruña, Spain
20:00	Sergio 59' (yellow card) 94'; Riki (yellow card) 63'; Barragán (yellow card) 89'	Report	15' García; 114' Tamudo	Stadium: Estadio Riazor; Referee: Manuel Mejuto González

Espanyol won 3–2 on aggregate

== Coaching staff ==
Position	Staff
Head coach	(Spain) Miguel Ángel Lotina
Assistant Coach	(Spain) José Luis Ribera

== See also ==
- 2007–08 La Liga
- 2007–08 Copa del Rey
