= 2012–13 Deportivo de La Coruña season =

Deportivo de La Coruña
2012–13 season
- Chairman: Augusto César Lendoiro
- Manager: Domingos Paciência
- Stadium: Riazor
- La Liga: 19th (relegated)
- Copa del Rey: Round of 32
- Top goalscorer: League: Riki (13); All: Riki (13)
Home colours	Away colours	Third colours

The 2012–13 Deportivo de La Coruña season was the 82nd season in club history.

== Current squad ==
The numbers are established according to the official website: www.canaldeportivo.com

As of 1 February 2013

Note: Flags indicate national team as defined under FIFA eligibility rules; some limited exceptions apply. Players may hold more than one non-FIFA nationality.

No.	Pos.	Nation	Player
1	GK	ESP	Daniel Aranzubia
2	DF	ESP	Manuel Pablo (captain)
3	DF	BRA	Evaldo (on loan from Sporting CP)
4	MF	ESP	Álex Bergantiños
5	DF	POR	Zé Castro
6	DF	ESP	Aythami Artiles
8	MF	POR	André Santos (on loan from Sporting CP)
9	FW	POR	Pizzi (on loan from Atlético Madrid)
10	MF	ESP	Juan Domínguez
11	FW	ESP	Riki
12	MF	BRA	Paulo Assunção
13	GK	ARG	Germán Lux

No.	Pos.	Nation	Player
14	MF	COL	Abel Aguilar (on loan from Hércules)
15	DF	ESP	Laure
16	MF	POR	Bruno Gama
17	DF	ESP	Ayoze Díaz
18	MF	ESP	Javier Camuñas (on loan from Villarreal)
19	DF	POR	Sílvio (on loan from Atlético)
20	MF	ESP	Jesús Vázquez
21	MF	ESP	Juan Carlos Valerón (vice-captain)
22	MF	POR	Diogo Salomão (on loan from Sporting CP)
23	DF	BRA	Kaká (on loan from Videoton)
24	DF	ESP	Carlos Marchena
25	FW	POR	Nélson Oliveira (on loan from Benfica)

=== Out on loan ===
Note: Flags indicate national team as defined under FIFA eligibility rules; some limited exceptions apply. Players may hold more than one non-FIFA nationality.

No.	Pos.	Nation	Player
—	MF	ESP	Juan Carlos (at Huesca until 30 June 2013)
—	DF	ESP	Diego Seoane (at Córdoba until 30 June 2013)

No.	Pos.	Nation	Player
—	DF	ESP	David Rochela (at Hapoel Tel Aviv until 30 June 2013)

== Competitions ==
=== Legend ===
Win Draw Loss Postponed

=== La Liga ===
==== League table ====
Pos	Team	Pld	W	D	L	GF	GA	GD	Pts	Qualification or relegation
16	Osasuna	38	10	9	19	33	50	−17	39	
17	Celta Vigo	38	10	7	21	37	52	−15	37	
18	Mallorca (R)	38	9	9	20	43	72	−29	36	Relegation to Segunda División
19	Deportivo La Coruña (R)	38	8	11	19	47	70	−23	35	Relegation to Segunda División
20	Zaragoza (R)	38	9	7	22	37	62	−25	34	Relegation to Segunda División

Source: La Liga
Rules for classification: 1st points; 2nd head-to-head points; 3rd head-to-head goal difference; 4th goal difference; 5th number of goals scored; 7th Fair-play points
(R) Relegated

==== Matches ====
20 August 2012 1	Deportivo	2–0	Osasuna	A Coruña
18:00 BTS (UTC 00)	Evaldo (yellow card) 17'; Riki 53'; Aythami (yellow card) 57'; Domínguez (yellow card) 67'; Oliveira 90'	Report	Sisi (yellow card) 36' Flaño (yellow card) 45' Damià (yellow card) 63' Fernández (yellow card) 75'	Stadium: Riazor; Attendance: 36,000; Referee: David Fernández Borbalán

26 September 2012 2	Valencia	3 – 3	Deportivo	Valencia
23:00	Soldado 11', 28'; Feghouli 41'	Report	Aguilar 38', 59'; Pizzi 76' (pen.)	Stadium: Mestalla; Attendance: 35,000; Referee: Carlos Velasco Carballo

1 September 2012 3	Deportivo	1 – 1	Getafe	A Coruña
20:00	Riki 6'	Report	Barrada 26'	Stadium: Riazor; Attendance: 30,000; Referee: Antonio Mateu Lahoz

16 September 2012 4	Granada	1 – 1	Deportivo	Granada
16:00	Floro Flores 82'	Report	Oliveira 41'	Stadium: Los Cármenes; Attendance: 21,000; Referee: Jesús Gil Manzano

24 September 2012 5	Deportivo	0 – 2	Sevilla	A Coruña
21:30		Report	Navas (yellow card) 65'; Negredo 75'; Rakitić 84'; Boatía (yellow card) 88'	Stadium: Riazor; Attendance: 30,000; Referee: José González González

30 September 2012 6	Real Madrid	5 – 1	Deportivo	Madrid
19:50	Ronaldo 23' (pen.), 44', 84' (pen.); Özil (yellow card) 34'; Di María 38'; Modrić (yellow card) 50'; Pepe 66'	Summary	Riki 16'; Manuel Pablo (yellow card) 23'; Evaldo (yellow card) 83'; Laure (yellow card) 83'	Stadium: Santiago Bernabéu; Attendance: 65,000; Referee: Miguel Ayza Gámez

6 October 2012 7	Rayo Vallecano	2 – 1	Deportivo	Madrid
16:00	Labaka (yellow card) 13'; Piti 18'; José Carlos 29'; Tito (yellow card) 40'; Domínguez (yellow card) 60'; Rubén (yellow card) 68'; Casado (yellow card) 77'; Amat (yellow card) 82'; Delibašić (yellow card) 89'; Nielsen (yellow card) 90'	Summary	Pizzi 41' (pen.); Riki (yellow card) 47'; Bergantiños (yellow card) 54'	Stadium: Vallecas; Attendance: 11,500; Referee: Pedro Pérez Montero

20 October 2012 8	Deportivo	4 – 5	Barcelona	A Coruña
22:00	Pizzi 26' (pen.), 47'; Bergantiños 37', (yellow card) 40'; Ayoze (yellow card) 52'; Valerón (yellow card) 57'; Laure (yellow card) 60'; Alba 79' (o.g.)	Summary	Alba 3'; Tello 8'; Messi 18', 43', 77', (yellow card) 85'; Mascherano (yellow card) 21' (yellow-red card) 49'; Iniesta (yellow card) 39'; Fàbregas (yellow card) 78'	Stadium: Riazor; Attendance: 34,600; Referee: José Paradas

27 October 2012 9	Celta Vigo	1 – 1	Deportivo	Vigo
20:00	Bermejo 8'; Oubiña (yellow card) 42'; Cabral (yellow card) 48' (yellow-red card) 51'; Krohn-Dehli (yellow card) 90'	Summary	Castro (yellow card) 12'; Domínguez 29', (yellow card) 53'; Marchena (yellow card) 37'; Laure (yellow card) 73'	Stadium: Balaídos; Attendance: 24,875; Referee: Alberto Undiano Mallenco

4 November 2012 10	Deportivo	1 – 0	Mallorca	A Coruña
16:00	Gama 30'; Pizzi (yellow card) 87'	Summary	Arizmendi (yellow card) 18'; Pedro Geromel (yellow card) 37'	Stadium: Riazor; Attendance: 25,000; Referee: Carlos Velasco Carballo

10 November 2012 11	Real Zaragoza	5 – 3	Deportivo	Zaragoza
20:00	Loovens (yellow card) 17'; Apoño 28' (pen.); Abraham (yellow card) 50'; Álvaro (yellow card) 59', (goal) 66'; Montañés 61'; Postiga 77', 82'; Săpunaru (yellow card) 90'	Summary	Gama 13'; Riki 21'; Pinto (yellow card) 26'; Pizzi (yellow card) 27' (yellow-red card) 49'; Camuñas (yellow card) 65'; Laure (yellow card) 85'; Bodipo 90+2'	Stadium: La Romareda; Attendance: 16,000; Referee: Fernando Teixeira Vitienes

=== Copa del Rey ===
==== Round of 32 ====
1 November 2012 First leg	Deportivo de La Coruña	v	Mallorca	A Coruña
21:00				Stadium: Riazor

27 November 2012 Second leg	Mallorca	v	Deportivo de La Coruña	Palma, Majorca
				Stadium: Iberostar
