= 2012–13 RCD Mallorca season =

RCD Mallorca
2012–13 season
- Manager: Joaquín Caparrós(1–22); Gregorio Manzano(23–38)
- Stadium: Iberostar Stadium
- La Liga: 18th
- Copa Del Rey: Round of 16
Home colours	Away colours

The 2012–13 season was the 79th season in Real Club Deportivo Mallorca's history and their 16th consecutive season in La Liga, the top division of Spanish football.

Mallorca competed for their first La Liga title after an eighth-place finish in the 2011–12 La Liga. They also entered the Copa del Rey in the Round of 32 and were knocked out in the Round of 16 by Sevilla in a 6–2 aggregate defeat.

== Squad ==
The numbers are established according to the official website: www.rcdmallorca.es

As of 1 April 2013

Note: Flags indicate national team as defined under FIFA eligibility rules; some limited exceptions apply. Players may hold more than one non-FIFA nationality.

No.	Pos.	Nation	Player
1	GK	ESP	Juan Calatayud
2	DF	SCO	Alan Hutton (on loan from Aston Villa)
3	MF	BRA	João Victor
4	DF	BRA	Anderson Conceição
5	MF	ESP	Tomás Pina
6	DF	ESP	Antonio López
7	MF	FRA	Michael Pereira
8	FW	EQG	Emilio Nsue
9	MF	MEX	Giovani dos Santos
10	FW	ISR	Tomer Hemed
11	MF	ESP	Javi Márquez
12	MF	ARG	Fernando Tissone
13	GK	ISR	Dudu Aouate

No.	Pos.	Nation	Player
14	DF	BRA	Pedro Geromel (on loan from 1. FC Köln)
16	DF	POR	José Nunes (captain)
17	DF	ESP	Pedro Bigas
18	FW	ESP	Víctor Casadesús
19	MF	ESP	José Luis Martí (vice-captain)
20	DF	ESP	Antonio Luna (on loan from Sevilla)
21	MF	ESP	Alejandro Alfaro
22	FW	ESP	Javier Arizmendi
23	DF	ESP	Kevin García
24	DF	ESP	Andreu Fontàs (on loan from Barcelona)
25	GK	ESP	Rubén Miño
27	DF	ESP	Ximo Navarro
30	FW	ESP	Álvaro Giménez

=== Out on loan ===
Note: Flags indicate national team as defined under FIFA eligibility rules; some limited exceptions apply. Players may hold more than one non-FIFA nationality.

No.	Pos.	Nation	Player
—	DF	NED	Gianni Zuiverloon (at Heerenveen)
—	MF	JPN	Akihiro Ienaga (at Gamba Osaka)
—	FW	BEL	Marvin Ogunjimi (at Standard Liège)

== Competitions ==
=== La Liga ===
==== League table ====
Pos	Team	Pld	W	D	L	GF	GA	GD	Pts	Qualification or relegation
16	Osasuna	38	10	9	19	33	50	−17	39	
17	Celta Vigo	38	10	7	21	37	52	−15	37	
18	Mallorca (R)	38	9	9	20	43	72	−29	36	Relegation to Segunda División
19	Deportivo La Coruña (R)	38	8	11	19	47	70	−23	35	Relegation to Segunda División
20	Zaragoza (R)	38	9	7	22	37	62	−25	34	Relegation to Segunda División

Source: La Liga
Rules for classification: 1st points; 2nd head-to-head points; 3rd head-to-head goal difference; 4th goal difference; 5th number of goals scored; 7th Fair-play points
(R) Relegated

==== Positions by round ====
The table lists the positions of teams after completion of each round.

Round	1	2	3	4	5	6	7	8	9	10	11	12	13	14	15	16	17	18	19	20	21	22	23	24	25	26	27	28	29	30	31	32	33	34	35	36	37	38
Mallorca	4	6	3	4	3	5	6	8	12	13	15	15	16	17	17	18	16	16	18	19	19	19	19	19	19	19	18	18	19	20	19	18	20	20	20	19	20	18

Source: kicker.de, AllTimeSoccer.com

==== Matches ====
Win Draw Loss Postponed

18 August 2012 1	Mallorca	2–1	Espanyol	Palma
23:00	Hemed 2', 85'		Mubarak 6'	Stadium: Iberostar; Attendance: 12,000; Referee: Alberto Undiano Mallenco

27 August 2012 2	Málaga	1–1	Mallorca	Málaga
23:00	Juanmi 76'		Hemed 67'	Stadium: La Rosaleda; Attendance: 23,542; Referee: Jesús Gil Manzano

1 September 2012 3	Mallorca	1–0	Real Sociedad	Palma
22:30	João Victor 75'			Stadium: Iberostar; Attendance: 12,000; Referee: David Fernández Borbalán

16 September 2012 4	Osasuna	1–1	Mallorca	Pamplona
18:00	Sola 69'		Hemed 78'	Stadium: El Sadar; Attendance: 15,000; Referee: Miguel Ángel Ayza Gámez

23 September 2012 5	Mallorca	2–0	Valencia	Palma
23:00	Víctor 8'; Arizmendi 55'			Stadium: Iberostar; Attendance: 14,495; Referee: Alfonso Alvarez Izquierdo

1 October 2012 6	Getafe	1–0	Mallorca	Getafe
12:30	Castro 49'			Stadium: Coliseum Alfonso Pérez; Attendance: 10,000; Referee: Alberto Undiano Mallenco

7 October 2012 7	Mallorca	1–2	Granada	Palma
--:--	Hemed 86'		El-Arabi 65'; Torje 76'	Stadium: Iberostar; Attendance: 11,655; Referee: Alejandro José Hernández

22 October 2012 8	Sevilla	3–2	Mallorca	Seville
21:30	Negredo 29, 56'; Cicinho 76'		Bigas 26'; Hemed 30'	Stadium: Ramón Sánchez Pizjuán

28 October 2012 9	Mallorca	0–5	Real Madrid	Palma
22:30			Higuaín 8', 70'; Ronaldo 22', 73'; Callejón 90+1'	Stadium: Iberostar; Attendance: 17,500; Referee: Pérez Lasa (Basque Country)

4 November 2012 10	Deportivo La Coruña	1–0	Mallorca	A Coruña
15:00	Gama 30'			Stadium: Riazor; Attendance: 25,000; Referee: Carlos Velasco

11 November 2012 11	Mallorca	2–4	Barcelona	Palma
16:50	Pereira 55'; Víctor 58'		Xavi 28'; Messi 44', 70'; Tello 45'	Stadium: Iberostar; Attendance: 15,500; Referee: es:Ignacio Iglesias Villanueva

18 November 2012 12	Celta Vigo	1–1	Mallorca	Vigo
15:00	Park 56'		Hemed 22'	Stadium: Balaídos; Attendance: 17,814; Referee: Pedro Pérez

24 November 2012 13	Rayo Vallecano	2–0	Mallorca	Madrid
15:00	Baptistão 87'; Delibašić 90'			Stadium: Vallecas; Attendance: 9,847; Referee: Fernando Teixeira

2 December 2012 14	Mallorca	1–1	Zaragoza	Palma
20:00	Víctor 85'		Postiga 16'	Stadium: Iberostar; Attendance: 7,735; Referee: Miguel Pérez

9 December 2012 15	Levante	4–0	Mallorca	Valencia
11:00	Martins 43'; Navarro 49'; García 54'; Iborra 58'			Stadium: Ciutat de València; Attendance: 12,642; Referee: Carlos Delgado

15 December 2012 16	Mallorca	0–1	Athletic Bilbao	Palma
17:00			Aduriz 11'	Stadium: Iberostar; Attendance: 12,824; Referee: Carlos del Cerro

22 December 2012 17	Betis	1–2	Mallorca	Seville
15:00	Beñat 6'		Víctor 31'; Márquez 47'	Stadium: Benito Villamarín; Attendance: 32,332; Referee: Alberto Undiano

6 January 2013 18	Mallorca	1–1	Atlético Madrid	Palma
20:00	García 87'		García 72'	Stadium: Iberostar; Attendance: 10,700; Referee: Antonio Mateu

12 January 2013 19	Valladolid	3–1	Mallorca	Valladolid
15:00	Ebert 22', 90+3'; González 88'		Víctor 38'	Stadium: Nuevo José Zorrilla; Attendance: 12,949; Referee: Alejandro Hernández

18 January 2013 20	Espanyol	3–2	Mallorca	Barcelona
20:00	Simão 16'; Verdú 68'; Baena 83'		Dos Santos 35'; Márquez 42'	Stadium: Cornellà-El Prat; Attendance: 17,169; Referee: Carlos Clos

27 January 2013 21	Mallorca	2–3	Málaga	Palma
20:00	Víctor 27'; Dos Santos 71'		Saviola 10'; Isco 16'; Monreal 62'	Stadium: Iberostar; Attendance: 10,547; Referee: Carlos Velasco

9 February 2013 22	Mallorca	1–1	Osasuna	Palma
15:00	Geromel 90+1'		Lolo 77'	Stadium: Iberostar; Attendance: 13,816; Referee: Pedro Pérez

=== Copa del Rey ===
Kickoff times are in CET.

==== Round of 32 ====
1 November 2012 First Leg	Deportivo La Coruña	1–1	Mallorca	A Coruña
20:00	Manuel Pablo 54'		Geromel 71'	Stadium: Riazor; Attendance: 17,000; Referee: Miguel Ángel Ayza

28 November 2012 Second Leg	Mallorca	0–0 (1–1 agg.)	Deportivo La Coruña	Palma
				Stadium: Iberostar; Attendance: 5,270; Referee: Javier Estrada

12 December 2012 First Leg	Mallorca	0–5	Sevilla	Palma
19:00			Negredo 13', 18'; Medel 26'; Botía 47'; Luna 85'	Stadium: Iberostar; Attendance: 4,330; Referee: Carlos Clos

9 January 2013 Second Leg	Sevilla	1–2 (6–2 agg.)	Mallorca	Seville
18:30	Manu 22'		Brandon 52'; Giménez 56'	Stadium: Ramón Sánchez Pizjuán; Attendance: 20,000; Referee: José González
