= David Vázquez =

David Vázquez may refer to:

- David Vázquez (cyclist) (born 1979), Spanish cyclist
- David Vázquez (footballer, born 1986), Spanish football midfielder
- David Vazquez (soccer, born 2006), American soccer midfielder for San Diego FC

== See also ==
- Chapi (footballer) (born 1985), born David Vázquez González, Spanish football defender
