= Dudu Aouate =

Israeli footballer (born 1977)

Dudu Aouate דודו אוואט
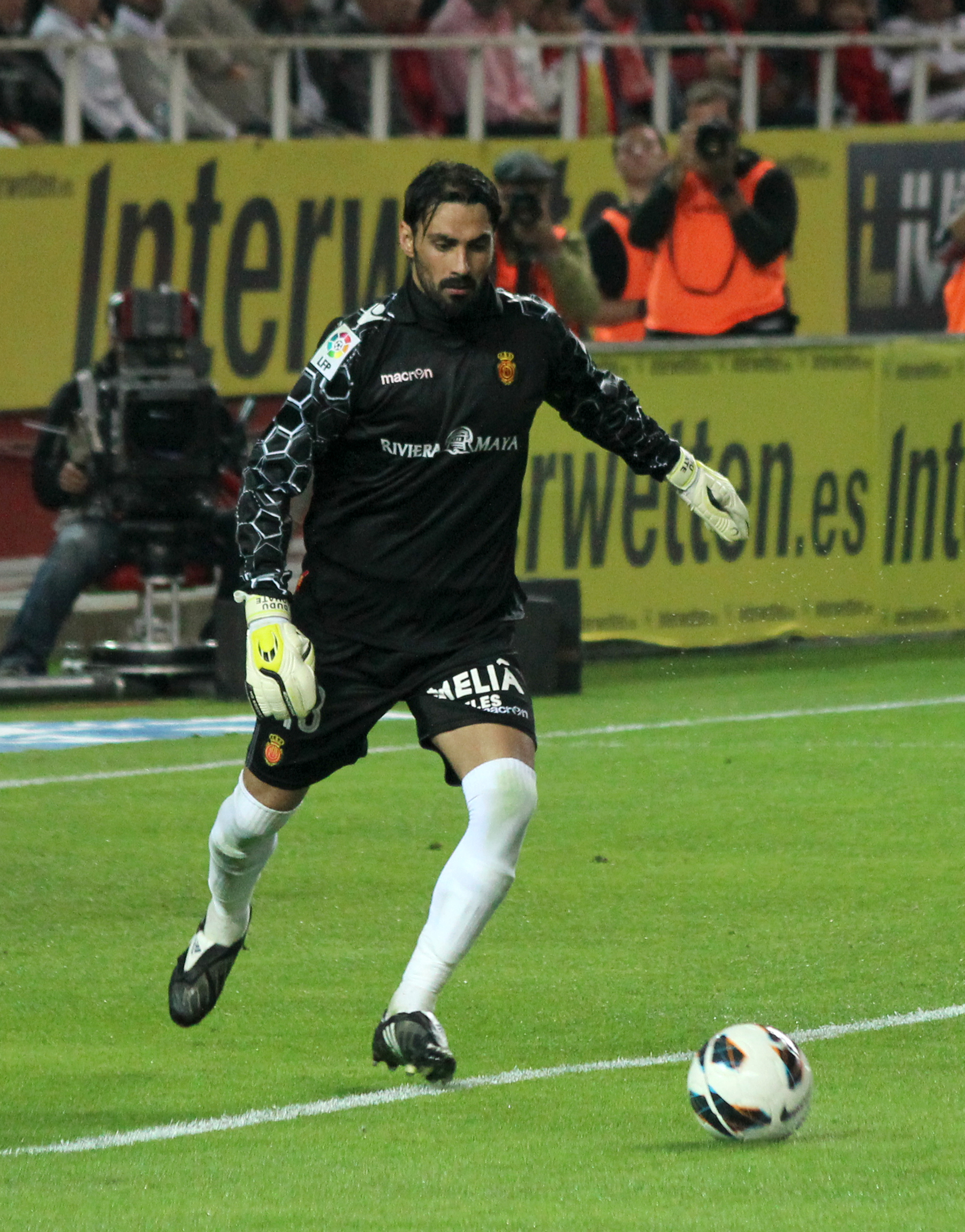
- Aouate playing with Mallorca in 2012

Personal information
- Full name: David Aouate
- Date of birth: 17 October 1977 (age 49)
- Place of birth: Nazareth Illit, Israel
- Height: 1.88 m (6 ft 2 in)
- Position: Goalkeeper

Youth career
- Maccabi Haifa

Senior career*
Years	Team	Apps	(Gls)
1995–1997	Maccabi Haifa	0	(0)
1995–1996	→ Hapoel Nazareth Illit (loan)	3	(0)
1997–1998	Maccabi Tel Aviv	1	(0)
1998–2001	Hapoel Haifa	104	(0)
2001–2003	Maccabi Haifa	60	(0)
2003–2006	Racing Santander	78	(0)
2006–2008	Deportivo La Coruña	66	(0)
2009–2014	Mallorca	167	(0)
Total		479	(0)

International career
1998–1999	Israel U21	12	(0)
1999–2014	Israel	78	(0)
- * Club domestic league appearances and goals

David "Dudu" Aouate (or Awat, Hebrew: דוד "דודו" אוואט, pronounced Dūdū Ahwaht; born 17 October 1977) is an Israeli retired professional footballer who played as a goalkeeper.

After playing for several clubs in his country, most notably Maccabi Haifa, he moved to Spain in 2003, going on to represent Racing de Santander, Deportivo La Coruña and Mallorca for a total of 303 La Liga matches.

Aouate won 78 caps for Israel, during 14 years.

== Club career ==
=== Israel ===
David Aouate was born in Nazareth Illit, Israel (now Nof HaGalil, Israel), to a family of Sephardic Jewish descent. He began his career at Maccabi Haifa F.C. where he had also played youth football, as an understudy to Nir Davidovich. Wanting first-team action, he was loaned to Hapoel Nazareth Illit F.C. but never got a real chance until he transferred to Hapoel Haifa FC, having been assured that he would be the club's first-choice, but he again found himself struggling to establish himself as such.

Early in the 1998–99 season, however, the team's regular, Avi Peretz, was injured, and Aouate took his place. Hapoel eventually won the championship that year and he was praised for his performances; by the time Peretz recovered, Aouate was irreplaceable.

Aouate's performances for Hapoel saw him get called up to the Israel national team in 1999. In the 2001–02 campaign he returned to Maccabi Haifa as a cover for Davidovich, who was seriously injured, and the team went on to win the Premier League as he established himself as the undisputed starter.

In 2002–03, Aouate was the starter as Maccabi played in the UEFA Champions League, the first time an Israeli side made it to the group stage of the competition. Haifa finished in third place in their group following a historic victory over powerhouse Manchester United, finishing runners-up in the league to Maccabi Tel Aviv; his solid performances earned him a transfer to European football, with Spanish club Racing de Santander signing him on 17 July 2003.

=== Spain ===
Aouate's move to Spain was made easier by the fact that he obtained a French passport, thus not counting as a foreigner. After forcing his way into the starting line-up in 2004–05 due to Ricardo's loan return to Manchester United – going on to play 74 games out of 76 in his final two years – he signed a four-year contract with fellow La Liga side Deportivo de La Coruña in August 2006, in a swap deal involving three players plus €1.5 million. He quickly paid back the confidence of his new club with an excellent season, appearing in all 38 matches; Don Balón, a Spanish football magazine, placed him eighth on their list of La Liga's Footballer of the Year in 2007.

In 2007–08's January winter transfer window, after losing first-choice status to Gustavo Munúa, both goalkeepers were involved in a post-training punching session that resulted in both being suspended for the match against Villarreal CF, as well as subsequent league games. In February, due to B-team keeper Fabri's inexperience, both players were reinstated in the squad, with the Israeli regaining starting duties.

In late December, as he had been training separately with Munúa, not being part of Depor manager Miguel Ángel Lotina's plans, Aouate signed with RCD Mallorca for approximately €1 million until June 2011, as the Balearic Islands club was struggling in the league and dealing with an injury to first-choice Miguel Ángel Moyá. He made his debut on 8 January 2009, in a 3–1 win over UD Almería for the campaign's Copa del Rey; four days later, with Moyà still injured, he appeared in a 0–3 league loss at Real Madrid.

In June 2009, Moyà left for Valencia CF and Aouate became the automatic first-choice. In February 2013, he tied Mallorca's record for most appearances for a goalkeeper, and announced his retirement on 8 August 2014 at the age of 36. After his retirement he became the club's major shareholder, after buying Biel Cerdà and Lorenzo Serra Ferrer's shares, and was named general manager on 11 August.

==== Yom Kippur controversy ====
In an interview with Spain's Diario AS, Aouate was asked about the significance of Yom Kippur and some general questions about the prohibitions of the holiday. He added that he understood that playing football in this holiday was not allowed, but stated that if forced to play against Real Sociedad, in a September 2006 match, he would; his comments swirled a huge controversy in Israel with even a member of the Shas party calling for the player to be removed from the national team.

In September 2010, Aouate decided not to play against CA Osasuna because the game was supposed to start 18 minutes before the end of the Jewish fast day, and Mallorca accepted his rationale.

==== Antisemitism ====
In December 2009, during a match between Osasuna and Mallorca, Aouate was subjected to antisemitic chants coming from the Navarrese supporters – additionally, they waved Palestinian flags and called him "a murderer". The Royal Spanish Football Federation set up an inquiry into the incident, this being already the second time the player faced such abuse (the previous occurrence also being against Osasuna in 2006, while he was with Deportivo).

== International career ==
Aouate's strong domestic form earned him his first Israel call-ups, and his debut occurred on 10 October 1999 in a 0–3 away loss against Spain for the UEFA Euro 2000 qualifiers. Since then, he became an integral member of the national team set-up.

On 24 March 2007, Aouate kept a clean sheet in the 0–0 home draw to England in the Euro 2008 qualifying campaign, saving several shots from the opposition.

== Career statistics ==
=== Club ===
Appearances and goals by club, season and competition
Club	Season	League			National cup		League cup		Europe		Total	
Club	Season	Division	Apps	Goals	Apps	Goals	Apps	Goals	Apps	Goals	Apps	Goals
Hapoel Haifa	1998–99	Liga Leumit	27	0	1	0			2	0	30	0
Hapoel Haifa	1999–2000	Israeli Premier League	39	0	1	0			8	0	48	0
Hapoel Haifa	2000–01	Israeli Premier League	38	0	0	0			—		38	0
Hapoel Haifa	Total		104	0	2	0			10	0	116	0
Maccabi Haifa	2001–02	Israeli Premier League	31	0	3	0			4	0	38	0
Maccabi Haifa	2002–03	Israeli Premier League	29	0	2	0			9	0	40	0
Maccabi Haifa	Total		60	0	5	0			13	0	78	0
Racing Santander	2003–04	La Liga	4	0	2	0	—		—		6	0
Racing Santander	2004–05	La Liga	37	0	0	0	—		—		37	0
Racing Santander	2005–06	La Liga	37	0	0	0	—		—		37	0
Racing Santander	Total		78	0	2	0	—		—		80	0
Deportivo La Coruña	2006–07	La Liga	38	0	2	0	—		—		40	0
Deportivo La Coruña	2007–08	La Liga	28	0	0	0	—		—		28	0
Deportivo La Coruña	Total		66	0	2	0	—		—		68	0
Mallorca	2008–09	La Liga	14	0	4	0	—		—		18	0
Mallorca	2009–10	La Liga	38	0	2	0	—		—		40	0
Mallorca	2010–11	La Liga	35	0	0	0	—		—		35	0
Mallorca	2011–12	La Liga	37	0	0	0	—		—		37	0
Mallorca	2012–13	La Liga	35	0	3	0	—		—		38	0
Mallorca	2013–14	Segunda División	8	0	0	0	—		—		8	0
Mallorca	Total		167	0	9	0	—		—		176	0
Career total			475	0	20	0	0	0	23	0	518	0

=== International ===
Appearances and goals by national team and year
National team	Year	Apps	Goals
Israel	1999	2	0
Israel	2001	4	0
Israel	2002	4	0
Israel	2003	3	0
Israel	2004	0	0
Israel	2005	5	0
Israel	2006	5	0
Israel	2007	9	0
Israel	2008	8	0
Israel	2009	8	0
Israel	2010	8	0
Israel	2011	8	0
Israel	2012	7	0
Israel	2013	7	0
Total		78	0

== Honours ==
Hapoel Haifa

- Israeli Premier League: 1998–99
- Toto Cup: 2000–01

Maccabi Haifa

- Israeli Premier League: 2001–02
- Toto Cup: 2001–02

== See also ==
- List of select Jewish association football players
