= Chapi =

Chapi may refer to:

- a hoe used by the slaves on Curaçao for agriculture and also used as a percussion instrument
- a sub-tribe of Mara people in north eastern state of Mizoram
- Chapi language, the language of the subtribe
- Chapi, Mizoram, 2 kilometers from India-Myanmar border in east side of southernmost part of Mizoram state
- Chapi (name), a common name among the Aushi people of Luapula Province, Zambia
- Chapi (Kurdish dance)
- David Vázquez González, Spanish footballer nicknamed Chapi
- Ruperto Chapí, Spanish classical composer
- Chapi (Peru), a mountain in Peru
- Chapi, Iran, a village in Mazandaran Province, Iran
- Chapi (footballer), retired Spanish footballer
- Chapi Romano, Argentine footballer
- Virgin of Chapi, a Marian devotion in Peru
