= Antonio Barragán =

Spanish footballer (born 1987)

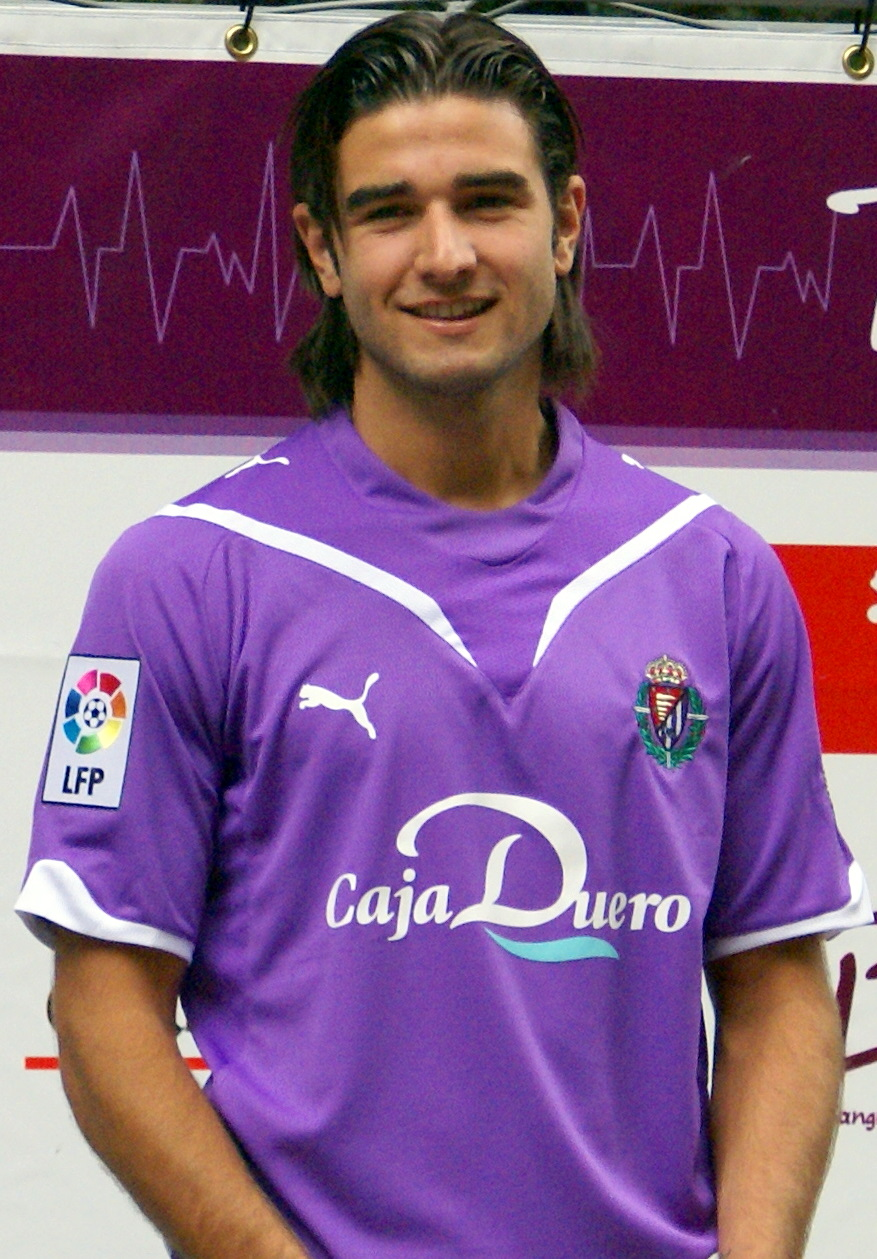
- Barragán being presented at Valladolid

Personal information
- Full name: Antonio Juan Barragán Fernández
- Date of birth: 12 June 1987 (age 39)
- Place of birth: Pontedeume, Spain
- Height: 1.82 m (6 ft 0 in)
- Position: Right-back

Youth career
- 2002–2005: Sevilla

Senior career*
| Years | Team | Apps | (Gls) |
| 2005–2006 | Liverpool | 0 | (0) |
| 2006–2009 | Deportivo La Coruña | 26 | (2) |
| 2009–2011 | Valladolid | 41 | (0) |
| 2011–2016 | Valencia | 110 | (1) |
| 2016–2018 | Middlesbrough | 26 | (0) |
| 2017–2018 | → Betis (loan) | 29 | (0) |
| 2018–2020 | Betis | 26 | (0) |
| 2020–2022 | Elche | 43 | (0) |
| Total | | 301 | (3) |

International career
| 2005 | Spain U17 | 4 | (0) |
| 2005–2006 | Spain U19 | 11 | (0) |
| 2007 | Spain U20 | 1 | (0) |
| 2007 | Spain U21 | 5 | (0) |
| 2006 | Galicia | 1 | (0) |
- * Club domestic league appearances and goals

Antonio Juan Barragán Fernández (born 12 June 1987) is a Spanish former professional footballer who played as a right-back.

Having started out at Liverpool, he spent most of his career in the two highest divisions of Spanish football, playing for Deportivo, Valladolid, Valencia, Betis and Elche. In La Liga, he amassed totals of 251 games and three goals over 13 seasons.

Barragán earned 21 caps for Spain at youth level.

== Club career ==
=== Liverpool ===
Born in Pontedeume, Galicia, Barragán signed for Liverpool in July 2005, as an 18-year-old who had yet to appear for Sevilla FC's first team.

He, however, spent the 2005–06 season with the club's reserves, managing one appearance for the first team, as a substitute for fellow Spaniard Fernando Morientes in the first leg of the third qualifying round of the UEFA Champions League against PFC CSKA Sofia. In doing so, he became the youngest foreigner to play for the Reds.

=== Deportivo ===
Barragán signed a five-year deal with Deportivo de La Coruña on 4 August 2006, in an operation that cost €1 million. His time at his new team began well, as he was in the starting eleven for the first eight La Liga matches and scored against Real Sociedad in a 2–0 home win, subsequently alternating in the right-back position with Manuel Pablo until he fractured his knee in April 2008, being out of action for the rest of the campaign and not featuring at all in 2008–09.

In 2008, Deportivo released Barragán from his contract without his consent. He successfully sued the club for an indemnity of €400,000, even though it later decided to reverse its previous decision and restore him to the squad.

=== Valladolid ===
In early June 2009, Barragán moved to Real Valladolid on a three-year contract. He played one season apiece in each of the two major levels of Spanish football, appearing in 17 league games in 2009–10 (14 starts) as the campaign ended in relegation.

=== Valencia ===
On 30 August 2011, Valladolid announced that Barragán would be leaving for Valencia CF in a deal worth €1.5 million. During his first season, all three right-backs – himself, Bruno and Miguel– appeared in roughly the same number of games as the Che finished third and once again qualified for the Champions League.

Barragán scored his first competitive goal for Valencia on 13 March 2014, his team's first in a 3–0 away victory over PFC Ludogorets Razgrad in the campaign's UEFA Europa League. He continued battling for first-choice status with another Portuguese, João Pereira.

On 5 January 2015, Barragán netted his only league goal for the side, equalising in an eventual 2–1 home defeat of Real Madrid which ended the visitors' record 22-match unbeaten run.

=== Middlesbrough ===
Barragán returned to England after ten years on 15 July 2016, agreeing to a three-year contract with Middlesbrough. He made his Premier League debut on 13 August, playing the full 90 minutes in a 1–1 home draw against Stoke City.

The season ended in relegation, while Barragán committed eight fouls in throw-ins.

=== Betis ===
On 6 July 2017, Barragán returned to Spain and its first division after agreeing to a one-year loan deal with Real Betis. Roughly one year later, the move was made permanent.

=== Elche ===
On 4 October 2020, Barragán signed a one-year contract with Elche CF, newly-returned to the top tier. He announced his retirement in February 2023, aged 36.

== International career ==
Barragán was part of the Spain under-19 team that emerged victorious at the 2006 UEFA European Championship in Poland. Just a few months later, following solid performances with Deportivo and former Sevilla teammate Antonio Puerta's call-up to the senior side, he was promoted to the under-21s.

In December 2006, Barragán appeared for the Galicia unofficial team in a friendly against Ecuador.

== Career statistics ==
As of match played 22 May 2021

Appearances and goals by club, season and competition
| Club | Season | League | | | National Cup | | League Cup | | Continental | | Total | |
| Club | Season | Division | Apps | Goals | Apps | Goals | Apps | Goals | Apps | Goals | Apps | Goals |
|---|---|---|---|---|---|---|---|---|---|---|---|---|
| Liverpool | 2005–06 | Premier League | 0 | 0 | 0 | 0 | 0 | 0 | 1 (Note: Appearances in UEFA Champions League) | 0 | 1 | 0 |
| Deportivo | 2006–07 | La Liga | 16 | 2 | 6 | 0 | — | | — | | 22 | 2 |
| Deportivo | 2007–08 | La Liga | 10 | 0 | 2 | 0 | — | | — | | 12 | 0 |
| Deportivo | 2008–09 | La Liga | 0 | 0 | 0 | 0 | — | | — | | 0 | 0 |
| Deportivo | Total | | 26 | 2 | 8 | 0 | — | | — | | 34 | 2 |
| Valladolid | 2009–10 | La Liga | 17 | 0 | 2 | 0 | — | | — | | 19 | 0 |
| Valladolid | 2010–11 | Segunda División | 23 | 0 | 4 | 1 | — | | — | | 27 | 1 |
| Valladolid | 2011–12 | Segunda División | 1 | 0 | 0 | 0 | — | | — | | 1 | 0 |
| Valladolid | Total | | 41 | 0 | 6 | 1 | — | | — | | 47 | 1 |
| Valencia | 2011–12 | La Liga | 18 | 0 | 3 | 0 | — | | 5 (Note: One appearance in UEFA Champions League and four in UEFA Europa League) | 0 | 26 | 0 |
| Valencia | 2012–13 | La Liga | 14 | 0 | 4 | 0 | — | | 5 | 0 | 23 | 0 |
| Valencia | 2013–14 | La Liga | 20 | 0 | 2 | 0 | — | | 9 (Note: Appearances in UEFA Europa League) | 1 | 31 | 1 |
| Valencia | 2014–15 | La Liga | 34 | 1 | 2 | 0 | — | | — | | 36 | 1 |
| Valencia | 2015–16 | La Liga | 24 | 0 | 5 | 0 | — | | 6 (Note: Three appearances in UEFA Champions League and three in UEFA Europa League) | 0 | 35 | 0 |
| Valencia | Total | | 110 | 1 | 16 | 0 | — | | 25 | 1 | 151 | 2 |
| Middlesbrough | 2016–17 | Premier League | 26 | 0 | 1 | 0 | 0 | 0 | — | | 27 | 0 |
| Betis (loan) | 2017–18 | La Liga | 29 | 0 | 2 | 0 | — | | — | | 31 | 0 |
| Betis | 2018–19 | La Liga | 14 | 0 | 5 | 1 | — | | 5 | 0 | 24 | 1 |
| Betis | 2019–20 | La Liga | 12 | 0 | 2 | 0 | — | | — | | 14 | 0 |
| Betis | Total | | 55 | 0 | 9 | 1 | — | | 5 | 0 | 69 | 1 |
| Elche | 2020–21 | La Liga | 27 | 0 | 0 | 0 | — | | — | | 27 | 0 |
| Career total | | | 285 | 3 | 40 | 2 | 0 | 0 | 31 | 1 | 356 | 6 |
