= Pablo Amo =

Spanish footballer (born 1978)

Personal information
- Full name: Pablo Amo Aguado
- Date of birth: 15 January 1978 (age 48)
- Place of birth: Madrid, Spain
- Height: 1.86 m (6 ft 1 in)
- Position: Centre-back

Team information
- Current team: Czech Republic (assistant)

Senior career*
| Years | Team | Apps | (Gls) |
| 1996–1997 | Moscardó | 16 | (0) |
| 1997–2000 | Sporting Gijón B | 76 | (3) |
| 1999–2002 | Sporting Gijón | 85 | (4) |
| 2002–2009 | Deportivo La Coruña | 40 | (4) |
| 2006 | → Valladolid (loan) | 0 | (0) |
| 2006–2007 | → Recreativo (loan) | 18 | (1) |
| 2009–2010 | Zaragoza | 9 | (0) |
| 2010–2011 | Panserraikos | 19 | (0) |
| 2011–2012 | Olympiakos Nicosia | 6 | (0) |
| Total | | 269 | (12) |

Managerial career
- 2016: ATK (assistant)
- 2017–2018: Atlético San Luis (assistant)
- 2019–2022: Spain U18
- 2022–2025: Spain (assistant)
- 2025: Al-Arabi
- 2026–: Czech Republic (assistant)
- * Club domestic league appearances and goals

Pablo Amo Aguado (born 15 January 1978) is a Spanish former professional footballer who played as a central defender. He is currently the assistant manager of the Czech Republic national team.

In a career undermined by injuries, he amassed La Liga totals of 67 matches and five goals over eight seasons, mainly with Deportivo de La Coruña. He started playing with Sporting de Gijón.

== Playing career ==
Born in Madrid, Amo started playing professional football with Sporting de Gijón, representing the Asturians in three Segunda División seasons. Signing with Deportivo de La Coruña for 2002–03, he went very much unnoticed until the 2007–08 campaign (serving two loans in the process), when he excelled in a five-man defence devised by coach Miguel Ángel Lotina.

On 13 January 2008, in his first match for Depor in three years, Amo scored and was sent off in a 4–3 away loss against Villarreal, also managing to find the net in a 2–0 home win over Barcelona three months later. However, he spent the following season on the sidelines, bothered by an Achilles tendon ailment.

Amo was deemed surplus to requirements at Deportivo, and on 3 August 2009 he joined Real Zaragoza on a two-year deal. His only season was again severely hindered by constant physical problems, but his team retained their La Liga status.

On 21 July 2010, aged 32, Amo moved abroad for the first time, signing with Panserraikos in Greece for one year. In the summer of 2011, he joined Cypriot First Division club Olympiakos Nicosia but, again plagued by injuries, was released in the following transfer window.

== Coaching career ==
After retiring, Amo worked as José Francisco Molina's assistant in the Association of Spanish Footballers; the duo were brought in to assemble a team of unemployed players in a tour of China and Spain during August-September 2012. The following year, he was hired by the Evergrande Football School in China, being responsible for developing young children.

In the summer of 2014, Amo moved to Sydney, Australia, where he worked as a youth manager. He also intended to open an academy with an Australian friend.

Amo reunited with Molina in May 2016, being part of his staff at Indian Super League club ATK. On 14 November 2017, they joined Atlético San Luis in the Ascenso MX ahead of the Clausura tournament.

In October 2018, Amo paired with Molina's at the Royal Spanish Football Federation when the latter was appointed sporting director. On 19 December 2019, the former was named new head coach of the Spain national under-18 team.

He was promoted in December 2022 when he was named assistant manager of Luis de la Fuente in the Spain national football team. After helping win the 2022-23 UEFA Nations League and the UEFA Euro 2024, he departed the RFEF on 12 February 2025 to sign for Qatar Stars League club Al-Arabi.

He was dismissed on 22 September, following a 8–1 Qatar Stars League home loss against Al Duhail.

Amo subsequently acted as assistant to Santi Denia at the Czech Republic national side.

== Managerial statistics ==
As of match played 20 September 2026

Managerial record by team and tenure
| Team | From | To | Record | | | | | | | |
| Team | From | To | G | W | D | L | GF | GA | GD | Win % |
|---|---|---|---|---|---|---|---|---|---|---|
| Spain U18 | 19 December 2019 | 11 December 2022 | 21 | 15 | 5 | 1 | 46 | 14 | +32 | 71.43 |
| Al-Arabi | 15 February 2025 | 22 September 2025 | 14 | 4 | 2 | 8 | 20 | 31 | −11 | 28.57 |
| Total | | | 35 | 19 | 7 | 9 | 66 | 45 | +21 | 54.29 |
