= Fabricio Agosto =

Spanish footballer (born 1987)

Fabri
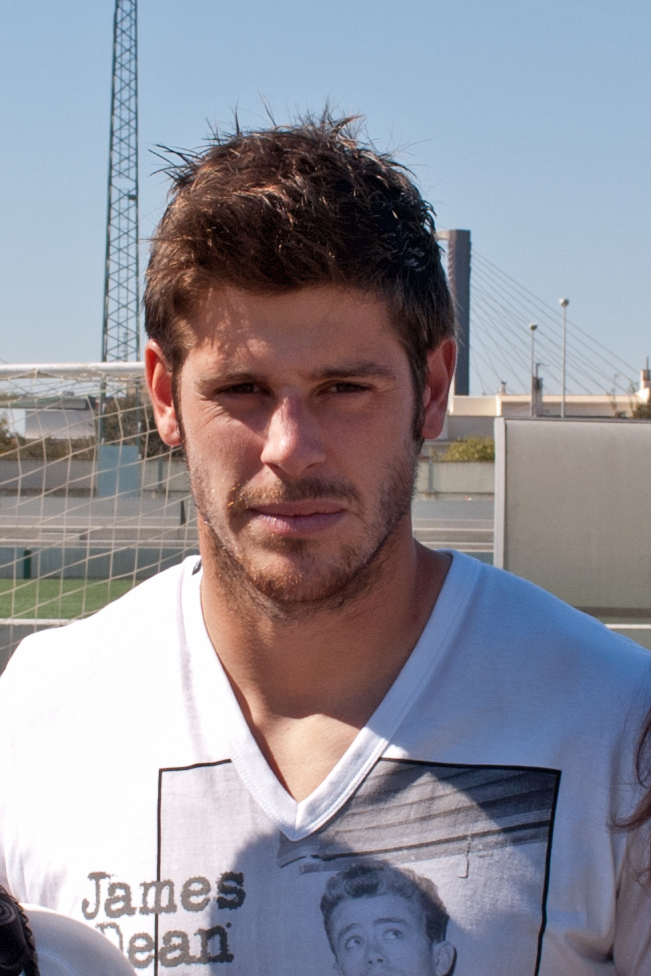
- Fabri with Betis in 2011

Personal information
- Full name: Fabricio Martín Agosto Ramírez
- Date of birth: 31 December 1987 (age 38)
- Place of birth: Vecindario, Spain
- Height: 1.84 m (6 ft 0 in)
- Position: Goalkeeper

Youth career
- 2003–2005: Vecindario
- 2005–2006: Deportivo La Coruña

Senior career*
Years	Team	Apps	(Gls)
2006–2008	Deportivo B	54	(0)
2007–2009	Deportivo La Coruña	6	(0)
2009–2011	Valladolid	1	(0)
2010–2011	→ Recreativo (loan)	40	(0)
2011–2013	Betis	17	(0)
2013–2016	Deportivo La Coruña	37	(0)
2016–2018	Beşiktaş	66	(0)
2018–2022	Fulham	2	(0)
2019–2020	→ Mallorca (loan)	1	(0)
2023	Numancia	0	(0)
2023–2024	Ibiza	1	(0)
Total		225	(0)

International career
2007	Spain U20	1	(0)
- * Club domestic league appearances and goals

Fabricio Martín Agosto Ramírez (Spanish pronunciation: [faˈβɾiθjo aˈɣosto raˈmiɾeθ]; born 31 December 1987), known as Fabri [ˈfaβɾi], is a Spanish former professional footballer who played as a goalkeeper.

He appeared in 56 La Liga matches over six seasons, representing Deportivo La Coruña (two spells), Real Valladolid, Real Betis and Mallorca in the competition. He also played in Turkey and England, winning the Süper Lig championship with Beşiktaş in 2016–17.

Fabri was a Spain international at under-20 level.

== Club career ==
=== Spain ===
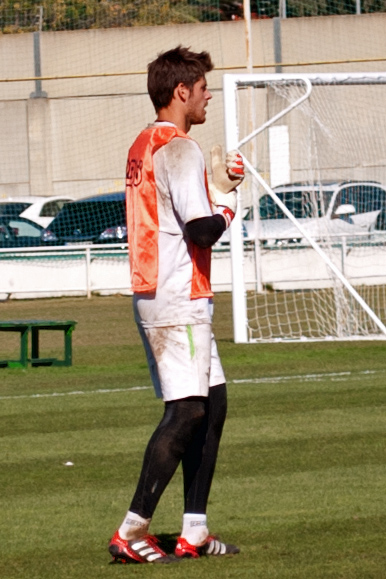
Fabri training with Betis in 2011

Fabri was born in Vecindario, Canary Islands. After being bought at almost 18 from local Vecindario, he finished his football development at Deportivo de La Coruña. After suspensions to goalkeeping teammates Dudu Aouate and Gustavo Munúa due to a post-training punching session, he was made first choice, and made his La Liga debut on 13 January 2008 in a 4–3 away loss against Villarreal; both offenders were reinstated in the first team late in the month, and he returned to the B squad.

In January 2008, Arsenal reportedly showed interest in signing Fabri, considered "one of Spain's brightest talents". During the 2008–09 season he was definitely promoted to backup duties as Munúa and Aouate were both deemed surplus to requirements, and also appeared in the Copa del Rey; however, after the Israeli's move to Mallorca, Munúa was again reinstated as second choice and Fabri returned to the reserves.

On 13 July 2009, Fabri was released by Depor, joining Real Valladolid on a 2+2 contract. On 19 August of the following year, he signed for Recreativo de Huelva of Segunda División on a one-year loan deal.

Fabri returned to the top flight for the 2011–12 campaign, moving to Real Betis. He played 17 competitive games in his first year, keeping clean sheets against Real Zaragoza (2–0, away), Málaga (2–0, also away) and Osasuna (1–0 at the Estadio Benito Villamarín). Following a run-in with manager Pepe Mel, he was demoted to third choice and eventually left the club in summer 2013, returning to Deportivo.

Fabri played second-fiddle to Germán Lux in the first year in his second spell in Galicia, but subsequently became the starter. He lost the vast majority of 2015–16, however, due to a tibia injury he originally contracted ten years ago (in 2011, whilst at Betis, he also suffered a potentially career-threatening shoulder ailment).

=== Beşiktaş ===
In July 2016, Fabri moved abroad for the first time, signing for Turkish Süper Lig champions Beşiktaş. In a 6–0 loss at Dynamo Kyiv in the group stage of the UEFA Champions League on 6 December, he began to cry after conceding the fourth goal of the first half.

Fabri only missed two matches in 34 in his first season in Istanbul, as his team were crowned champions for the second consecutive time and 15th overall.

=== Fulham ===
On 24 July 2018, Fabri joined Premier League club Fulham on a three-year deal with the option of a fourth year. He was already known to their goalkeeping coach José Sambade Carreira, with the pair having worked together at Deportivo. His first appearance in the Premier League took place on 11 August, in a 0–2 home defeat against Crystal Palace.

On 2 September 2019, Fabri was loaned to Mallorca for one year. His competitive input during his tenure at the Visit Mallorca Stadium consisted of four games, underperforming in his sole league one at Valladolid.

== International career ==
A former youth international for Spain, in February 2018 Fabri announced that he was of Uruguayan descent and wanted to represent its national team at the 2018 FIFA World Cup.

== Career statistics ==
Appearances and goals by club, season and competition
Club	Season	League			Cup		League cup		Europe		Total	
Club	Season	Division	Apps	Goals	Apps	Goals	Apps	Goals	Apps	Goals	Apps	Goals
Deportivo La Coruña	2006–07	La Liga	0	0	0	0	—		—		0	0
Deportivo La Coruña	2007–08	La Liga	6	0	0	0	—		—		6	0
Deportivo La Coruña	2008–09	La Liga	0	0	4	0	—		2 (Note: Appearances in UEFA Intertoto Cup)	0	6	0
Deportivo La Coruña	Total		6	0	4	0	—		2	0	12	0
Valladolid	2009–10	La Liga	1	0	2	0	—		—		3	0
Recreativo (loan)	2010–11	Segunda División	40	0	1	0	—		—		41	0
Betis	2011–12	La Liga	15	0	2	0	—		—		17	0
Betis	2012–13	La Liga	2	0	0	0	—		—		2	0
Betis	Total		17	0	2	0	—		—		19	0
Deportivo La Coruña	2013–14	Segunda División	6	0	2	0	—		—		8	0
Deportivo La Coruña	2014–15	La Liga	31	0	0	0	—		—		31	0
Deportivo La Coruña	2015–16	La Liga	0	0	0	0	—		—		0	0
Deportivo La Coruña	Total		37	0	2	0	—		—		39	0
Beşiktaş	2016–17	Süper Lig	32	0	1	0	—		11 (Note: Includes appearances in UEFA Champions League and UEFA Europa League)	0	44	0
Beşiktaş	2017–18	Süper Lig	34	0	2	0	—		6 (Note: Includes appearances in UEFA Champions League)	0	42	0
Beşiktaş	Total		66	0	3	0	—		17	0	86	0
Fulham	2018–19	Premier League	2	0	0	0	0	0	—		2	0
Fulham	2020–21	Premier League	0	0	0	0	0	0	—		0	0
Fulham	2021–22	Championship	0	0	0	0	0	0	—		0	0
Fulham	Total		2	0	0	0	0	0	—		2	0
Mallorca (loan)	2019–20	La Liga	1	0	3	0	—		—		4	0
Numancia	2022–23	Primera Federación	0	0	—		—		—		0	0
Ibiza	2023–24	Primera Federación	1	0	0	0	—		—		1	0
Career total			171	0	17	0	0	0	19	0	206	0

== Honours ==
Beşiktaş

- Süper Lig: 2016–17
