= Chapi (footballer) =

Spanish footballer (born 1985)

Personal information
- Full name: David Vázquez González
- Date of birth: 12 April 1985 (age 41)
- Place of birth: A Coruña, Spain
- Height: 1.84 m (6 ft 0 in)
- Position: Defender

Youth career
- Deportivo La Coruña

Senior career*
Years	Team	Apps	(Gls)
2005–2008	Deportivo B		
2007	Deportivo La Coruña	1	(0)
2008–2009	Waregem	1	(0)
2009–2010	Compostela	2	(0)
- * Club domestic league appearances and goals

David Vázquez González (born 12 April 1985 in A Coruña, Galicia), known as Chapi, is a Spanish retired footballer who played as a defender.

== Football career ==
A product of local Deportivo de La Coruña's youth ranks, Chapi appeared once for its first team during his three years as a senior with the club: on 16 December 2007, as the Galicians were coached by Miguel Ángel Lotina, he played 61 minutes against Real Zaragoza, replacing injured Manuel Pablo in a 1–1 home draw.

After failure in negotiations to further his link to Depor, Chapi was released and moved abroad, signing a 1+1 deal with Belgian side S.V. Zulte Waregem. However, unsettled, he returned to his country – and to his region – after just one season, joining lowly SD Compostela.
