= Xisco (footballer, born 1986) =

Spanish footballer

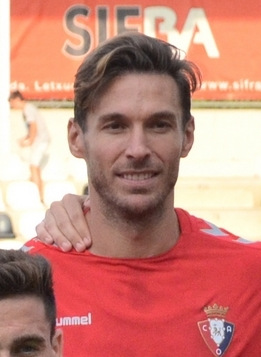
- Xisco with Osasuna in 2018

Personal information
- Full name: Francisco Jiménez Tejada
- Date of birth: 26 June 1986 (age 40)
- Place of birth: Santa Ponsa, Spain
- Height: 1.87 m (6 ft 1 1/2 in)
- Position: Striker

Youth career
- Atlético Baleares
- 2003–2004: Deportivo La Coruña

Senior career*
Years	Team	Apps	(Gls)
2004–2006	Deportivo B	53	(39)
2005–2008	Deportivo La Coruña	44	(12)
2006–2007	→ Vecindario (loan)	27	(13)
2008–2013	Newcastle United	9	(1)
2009–2010	→ Racing Santander (loan)	23	(3)
2011–2012	→ Deportivo La Coruña (loan)	25	(5)
2013–2016	Córdoba	95	(30)
2015	→ Mallorca (loan)	16	(9)
2016–2017	Muangthong United	13	(9)
2017–2019	Osasuna	61	(13)
2019–2020	Peñarol	23	(6)
2021–2022	Alcorcón	42	(11)
2023–2024	Atlético Baleares	19	(3)
Total		450	(154)

International career
2007–2009	Spain U21	11	(3)
- * Club domestic league appearances and goals

Francisco Jiménez Tejada (born 26 June 1986), known as Xisco, is a Spanish former professional footballer who played as a striker.

After beginning his career with Deportivo, he signed in 2008 with Newcastle United, but could only make 11 official appearances for the club during his spell (one goal), also being loaned twice during his contract. He left the latter in January 2013 and returned to his country, going on to spend four seasons with Córdoba and winning promotion to La Liga in 2013–14.

Xisco participated with Spain at the 2009 European Under-21 Championship.

== Club career ==
=== Deportivo ===
A product of Deportivo de La Coruña's youth ranks, Xisco was born in Santa Ponsa, Mallorca in the Balearic Islands, and he made his La Liga debut on 16 April 2005 against Real Sociedad. His first (and second) goal arrived also that season, in a 2–2 draw away to Real Zaragoza on 15 May.

In 2007–08, after a season-long loan at Segunda División's UD Vecindario, Xisco emerged as a top-flight striker, scoring five goals in two matches: a hat-trick in a 3–1 home win over Real Murcia CF on 30 March 2008, adding two at Racing de Santander (same result) the following week.

=== Newcastle United ===
On 1 September 2008, Xisco signed for Newcastle United for a reported initial fee of £5.7 million, although the fee could have eventually risen to £7 million subject to conditions. He made his debut for the club in the 1–2 home defeat against Hull City on 13 September, scoring in the game; however, he featured rarely during the season, being only seventh choice behind Michael Owen, Obafemi Martins, Mark Viduka, Peter Løvenkrands, Shola Ameobi and Andy Carroll.

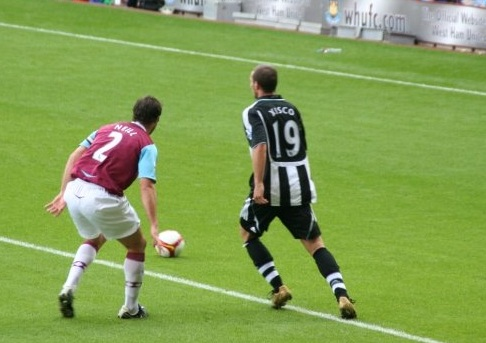
Xisco (right) in action for Newcastle in 2008

After only four months, Newcastle United attempted to sell Xisco, only to be blocked by FIFA who did not allow for a player to be registered for three clubs in one season. In February 2009 he stated he had not made a mistake by moving, insisting he would eventually succeed.

After Newcastle were relegated, Xisco stated that he was unsure whether to stay at the club, and eventually was signed on loan by Racing Santander on 31 August 2009, in a season-long move. Two weeks later he made his debut for the Cantabrians during a 1–1 draw at Atlético Madrid, having come on as a substitute for Alexandre Geijo for the final twenty minutes – he was replaced by Toni Moral before the final whistle due to injury, however. he netted his first goal for Racing on 3 January 2010, the second in a 2–0 win over CD Tenerife. On 27 January, in the quarter-finals of the Copa del Rey, he contributed to their 3–0 away defeat of CA Osasuna (5–1 on aggregate).

Manager Chris Hughton said that Xisco remained in his first-team plans upon the player's return to the Magpies in July 2010, with the latter stating he refused to give up on his future at the club. He came off the bench on 22 August in an impressive 6–0 home win against Aston Villa, setting up Carroll for his hat-trick in the 90th minute. After receiving a red card for an off-the-ball incident in a reserves game, he was suspended for three matches, and failed to appear for the team in the following months finding himself behind Ameobi, Carroll, Løvenkrands and Nile Ranger.

On 30 January 2011, Xisco returned to former club Deportivo on loan until the end of the season, being intermittently used and also suffering team relegation – he had been previously linked with a move to Real Zaragoza and a move back to Santander during the winter transfer window. On 11 August, he returned to the Estadio Riazor again on loan.

Xisco featured sparingly during 2011–12, due to injuries. On 27 May 2012, however, he scored arguably the most important goal of the campaign, helping Deportivo come from behind to win 2–1 at home against SD Huesca and seal promotion as champions with one round still remaining.

In summer 2012, Xisco revealed he could leave Newcastle, but opted to stay eventually. On 8 October 2012, he featured for the reserves for the first time since 2011, in a 2–1 win against Aston Villa's reserves, scoring a hat-trick against Stoke City two weeks later for the same competition; A month later, he was included in the first-team squad ahead of a UEFA Europa League match against Club Brugge KV.

Xisco's contract was terminated with immediate effect on 31 January 2013. He was named by the Newcastle Evening Chronicle as one of the club's worst strikers.

=== Córdoba ===
After his release, Xisco returned to his country by joining second-division Córdoba CF– upon arriving, he spoke of his hopes to revive his career whilst helping his team. He made his debut for his new club on 9 March 2013, coming on as a substitute and scoring a goal in a 4–3 defeat at FC Barcelona B.

Xisco appeared regularly for the Andalusians during the 2013–14 campaign, scoring ten goals as they returned to the Spanish top flight after a 42-year absence. On 23 January 2015, after featuring sparingly, he was loaned to RCD Mallorca until June.

=== Later years ===
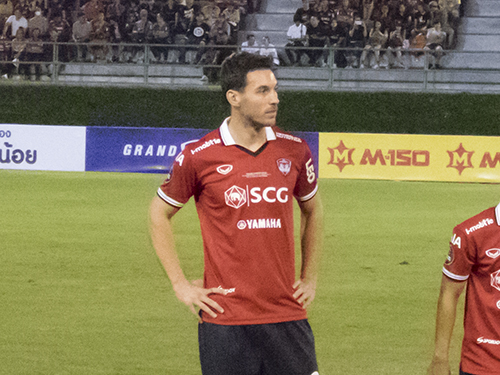
Xisco with Muangthong United in 2016

On 21 July 2017, after a one-season spell at Thailand's Muangthong United FC, Xisco signed a two-year contract with Osasuna. He scored five times in 2018–19, as the latter side returned to the top tier as champions.

On 16 September 2019, the 33-year-old Xisco agreed to a deal at Peñarol until the end of the Clausura Tournament in Uruguay. The following 15 January, he agreed to another year in Montevideo.

Xisco returned to Spain and its second division on 1 February 2021, signing for AD Alcorcón as a free agent. Two years later, having been training in Dubai to remain fit, he rejoined his first club CD Atlético Baleares after 20 years.

On 29 January 2024, Xisco announced his retirement at 37. Three months later, his last team confirmed their relegation to Segunda Federación.

== International career ==
Xisco made his Spain under-21 debut in a friendly with England on 6 February 2007, in which he had a shot hit the foot of the post. He scored his first goal in the category against Georgia during the 2009 UEFA European Championship qualifiers, adding to his tally by netting against Russia with a subtle finish also during that stage of the competition.

Xisco added another goal on 15 October 2008, in a 3–1 extra time win against Switzerland, helping Spain qualify for the finals where he did not score.

== Honours ==
Deportivo

- Segunda División: 2011–12

Muangthong United

- Thai League 1: 2016
- Thai League Cup: 2016
- Thailand Champions Cup: 2017

Osasuna

- Segunda División: 2018–19
