= Cristian Hidalgo =

Spanish footballer

Cristian
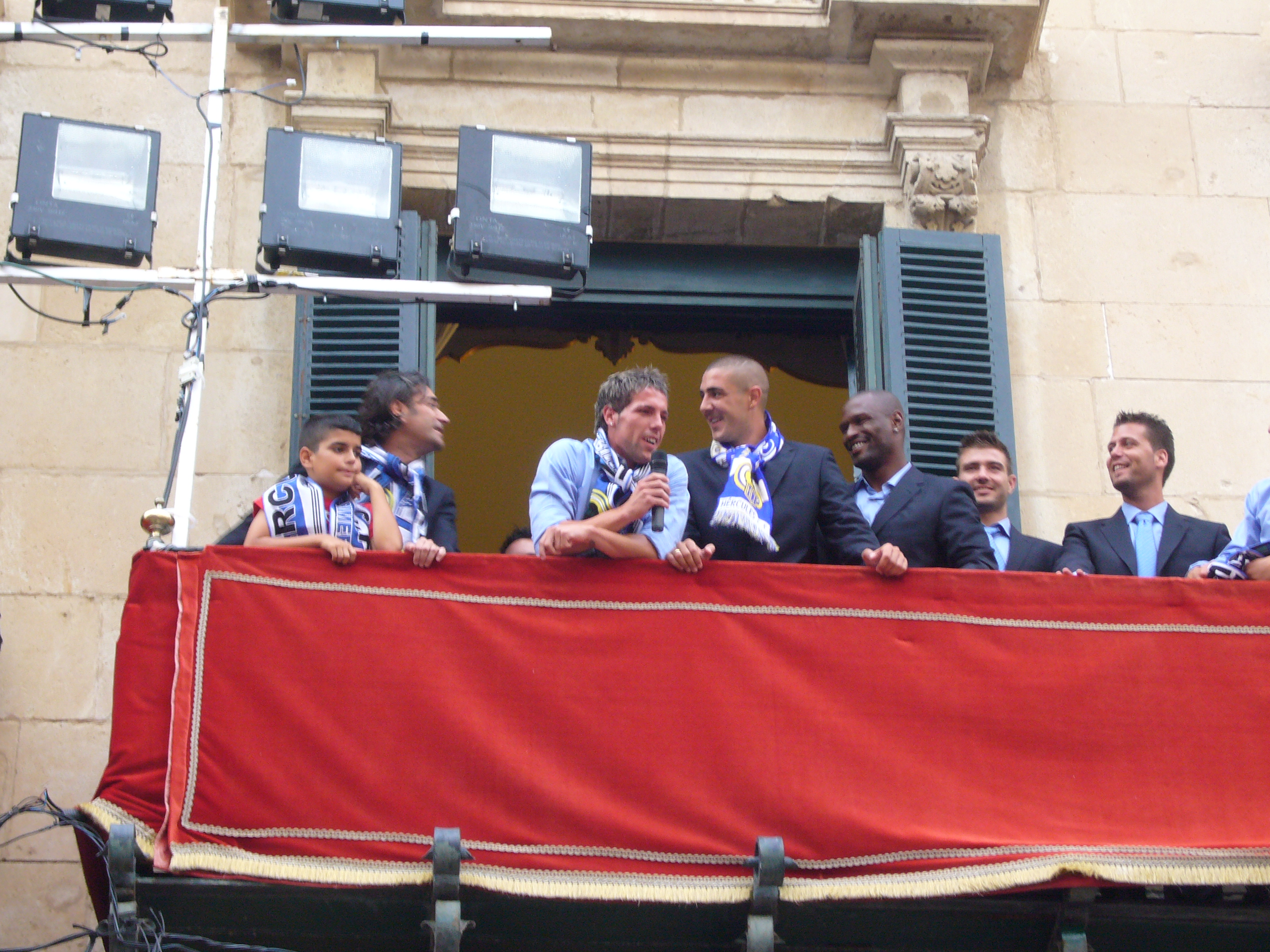
- Cristian (middle) celebrates La Liga promotion with Hércules

Personal information
- Full name: Cristian Hidalgo González
- Date of birth: 21 September 1983 (age 43)
- Place of birth: Barcelona, Spain
- Height: 1.71 m (5 ft 7 in)
- Position: Winger

Team information
- Current team: Ordino

Youth career
- Sant Gabriel
- Barcelona

Senior career*
| Years | Team | Apps | (Gls) |
| 2002–2003 | Barcelona C | 39 | (16) |
| 2003–2006 | Barcelona B | 93 | (18) |
| 2006 | Barcelona | 0 | (0) |
| 2006–2009 | Deportivo La Coruña | 56 | (2) |
| 2009–2011 | Hércules | 42 | (3) |
| 2012 | Elche | 7 | (0) |
| 2012 | Alki Larnaca | 10 | (1) |
| 2013 | Cherno More | 14 | (1) |
| 2013–2014 | Bnei Sakhnin | 26 | (1) |
| 2014 | Chennaiyin | 7 | (1) |
| 2015–2016 | Moghreb Tétouan | 11 | (1) |
| 2016 | Ceahlăul | 7 | (1) |
| 2016–2017 | Granollers | 7 | (2) |
| 2017–2018 | La Jonquera | 19 | (6) |
| 2018– | Ordino | | |
- * Club domestic league appearances and goals as of 25 November 2018

Cristian Hidalgo González (born 21 September 1983), known simply as Cristian, is a Spanish former professional footballer who played for Andorran club FC Ordino as a winger.

== Football career ==
Born in Barcelona, Catalonia, Cristian was a product of FC Barcelona's youth system. He scored three goals during 2003–04 and four in the following season, while performing as a forward with the B-team. The club's coaches would, however, change his role into one of a winger, and he impressed in this position, ending 2005–06 with 11 third division goals; he also played one official game for the main squad, a Copa del Rey match against Zamora CF.

Cristian signed for Deportivo de La Coruña as a free agent in the 2006–07 campaign, making his La Liga debut on 27 August 2006 as he came from the bench in a 3–2 home win over Real Zaragoza. As a starter, he scored his first top level goal in a 2–0 success against Real Madrid, also at the Estadio Riazor.

In his second year, Cristian netted his second league goal ever, in a 9 December 2007 defeat against his former employers, 1–2 at the Camp Nou. He would only appear in 14 league matches during the season, however.

After featuring even less in 2008–09, Cristian was released and joined Hércules CF in the second division on a three-year deal. He contributed with 23 games and three goals in his debut campaign (but only three starts) as the Alicante side returned to the top flight after 13 years.

In mid-March 2012, after seeing out his contract, Cristian signed with Elche CF in division two. He had been limited to training with Hércules for several months.

29-year-old Cristian moved abroad for the first time ever in 2012–13, splitting the season between Cyprus' and Alki Larnaca FC and Bulgarian club PFC Cherno More Varna. He was drafted by Chennaiyin FC in the second round of the 2014 ISL Inaugural International Draft, scoring his first goal for the club from a free kick against Mumbai City FC where he played in place of injured Elano, and contributing to a 3–0 away win.

In January 2015, Cristian signed for his fifth club in three years, joining Morocco's Moghreb Tétouan until June 2016.

== Club statistics ==
As of 26 November 2014

| Club | Season | League | | | Cup | | Continental | | Total | |
| Club | Season | Division | Apps | Goals | Apps | Goals | Apps | Goals | Apps | Goals |
|---|---|---|---|---|---|---|---|---|---|---|
| Deportivo | 2006–07 | La Liga | 29 | 1 | 4 | 0 | — | | 33 | 1 |
| Deportivo | 2007–08 | La Liga | 14 | 1 | 2 | 0 | — | | 16 | 1 |
| Deportivo | 2008–09 | La Liga | 13 | 0 | 3 | 0 | 4 (Note: Appearances in UEFA Europa League) | 0 | 20 | 0 |
| Deportivo | Total | | 56 | 2 | 9 | 0 | 4 | 0 | 69 | 2 |
| Hércules | 2009–10 | Segunda División | 23 | 3 | 4 | 2 | — | | 27 | 5 |
| Hércules | 2010–11 | La Liga | 19 | 0 | 2 | 0 | — | | 21 | 0 |
| Hércules | Total | | 41 | 3 | 6 | 2 | — | | 47 | 5 |
| Elche | 2011–12 | Segunda División | 7 | 0 | 0 | 0 | — | | 7 | 0 |
| Alki Larnaca | 2012–13 | Cypriot First Division | 10 | 1 | 0 | 0 | — | | 10 | 1 |
| Cherno More | 2012–13 | First Professional League | 14 | 1 | 0 | 0 | — | | 14 | 1 |
| Bnei Sakhnin | 2013–14 | Israeli Premier League | 26 | 1 | 1 | 0 | — | | 27 | 1 |
| Chennaiyin | 2014 | Indian Super League | 7 | 1 | — | | — | | 7 | 1 |
| Career total | | | 161 | 9 | 16 | 2 | 4 | 0 | 181 | 11 |
