= Sebastián Taborda =

Uruguayan footballer (born 1981)

Personal information
- Full name: Sebastián Taborda Ramos
- Date of birth: 22 May 1981 (age 45)
- Place of birth: Montevideo, Uruguay
- Height: 1.92 m (6 ft 4 in)
- Position: Centre forward

Youth career
- Defensor Sporting

Senior career*
Years	Team	Apps	(Gls)
2000–2005	Defensor Sporting	48	(21)
2001	→ Fénix (loan)	29	(14)
2003	→ UNAM Pumas (loan)	13	(3)
2004	→ Universidad Católica (loan)	11	(4)
2005–2009	Deportivo La Coruña	41	(5)
2008–2009	→ Hércules (loan)	13	(1)
2009–2011	Defensor Sporting	13	(1)
2010–2011	→ Newell's Old Boys (loan)	10	(0)
2011–2012	River Plate Montevideo	23	(12)
2012–2013	Nacional	12	(1)
2013	Defensor Sporting	6	(1)
2013–2014	River Plate Montevideo	19	(8)
2014–2015	Nacional	7	(0)
Total		245	(70)

International career
2003	Uruguay	1	(0)
- * Club domestic league appearances and goals

Sebastián Taborda Ramos (born 22 May 1981) is a Uruguayan former professional footballer who played as a centre forward.

== Club career ==
Born in Montevideo, Taborda started playing professionally with Defensor Sporting, and went on to serve three loan stints in as many countries. In the summer 2005 he joined La Liga club Deportivo de La Coruña, with the Spaniards playing €2.9 million for his services.

At the Galicians, Taborda was only a third-string striker, also having to battle with a series of injuries. On 27 November 2008, he signed for Segunda División team Hércules CF, loaned until the end of the season, going on to appear in less than one third of the league matches as the Alicante side finished fourth.

On 1 September 2009, Taborda's contract with Depor expired and he returned to Defensor after a four-year absence. In July 2010, however, he changed teams again, joining Newell's Old Boys from the Argentine Primera División.

== International career ==
Taborda received one full cap for Uruguay, which came on 4 February 2003 in a friendly match with Iran in Hong Kong. Additionally, he also represented the nation at under-20 and under-23 levels.
