= Rodolfo Bodipo =

Equatoguinean football player and manager (born 1977)

Personal information
- Full name: Rodolfo Bodipo Díaz
- Date of birth: 25 October 1977 (age 49)
- Place of birth: Dos Hermanas, Spain
- Height: 1.83 m (6 ft 0 in)
- Position: Striker

Youth career
- Dos Hermanas
- Sevilla
- CD Montequinto

Senior career*
Years	Team	Apps	(Gls)
1995–1996	Ángulo CF		
1996–1997	UA Ceutí		
1997–1998	Albacete B		
1997–1998	→ Hellín (loan)	10	(6)
1998	Isla Cristina	9	(2)
1998–2001	Recreativo	96	(21)
2001–2004	Racing Santander	81	(27)
2004–2006	Alavés	74	(23)
2006–2013	Deportivo La Coruña	90	(12)
2010	→ Vaslui (loan)	3	(0)
2010–2011	→ Elche (loan)	24	(2)
2013	Xerez	10	(2)
Total		397	(95)

International career
2003–2013	Equatorial Guinea	15	(4)

Managerial career
- 2017: Mancha Real
- 2017–2018: Equatorial Guinea (local coach)
- 2018–2019: Equatorial Guinea U23
- * Club domestic league appearances and goals

Rodolfo Bodipo Díaz (born 25 October 1977) is a former professional footballer who played as a striker, and is a current manager and politician. Born in Spain, he played for the Equatorial Guinea national team.

He appeared in 158 La Liga matches over eight seasons, scoring 32 goals in representation of Racing de Santander, Alavés and Deportivo. He added 200 games and 53 goals in Segunda División, and spent almost his entire professional career in Spain.

== Club career ==
Bodipo was born in the Spanish city of Dos Hermanas, Province of Seville in a biracial background, his father being Equatoguinean and his mother Spanish. After having played youth football with three clubs, including hometown's Dos Hermanas CF and Sevilla FC, and spending his first three and a half seasons in amateur football, he represented several teams in the country, with moderate scoring success: Recreativo de Huelva (three second division seasons), Racing de Santander and Deportivo Alavés (in both cases, helping his side achieve La Liga promotion); with the latter, he had his best statistical year in the 2004–05 campaign, as he netted 16 times – fifth in the league – in 39 games to help the Basques rank third.

For 2006–07, Bodipo joined Deportivo de La Coruña, where was usually fourth choice in his first two campaigns, although he spent his first on the sidelines due to a serious anterior cruciate ligament injury. However, during 2008–09, he managed to score three goals for Depor in two weeks starting in December 2008, including one against AS Nancy in the UEFA Cup group stage 1–0 home win, and another at Getafe CF in a 2–1 victory, while also winning a penalty kick that was converted by Sergio.

After an unassuming 2009–10 season – 15 matches, none complete, no goals – Bodipo, aged nearly 33, was loaned for one year to Liga I team FC Vaslui, in Romania. Just one month after, however, he terminated his contract and returned to Spain, being sparingly used by second-tier Elche CF.

Bodipo was appointed manager of Atlético Mancha Real on 14 March 2017. Two months later, following their descent into the Tercera División, he turned down a new contract.

== International career ==
Bodipo opted to represent Equatorial Guinea through parentage, as Javier Balboa and Benjamín. His first two caps, aged 26, came against Togo, playing in both legs of the first round of the 2006 FIFA World Cup qualifiers.

In November 2013, Bodipo was summoned for his last international, a friendly with the national team of his country of birth, Spain, to be played on the 16th; he featured the last five minutes of the 1–2 loss in Malabo. While a player, he was often the Nzalang Nacional's captain.

Bodipo returned to the national set-up in July 2017 as assistant manager, and coordinator of the youth teams.

== Outside football ==
In September 2020, Bodipo was named General Director of Youth and Sports of the Ministry of Education, Teaching and Sports of Equatorial Guinea.

== Career statistics ==
#	Date	Venue	Opponent	Score	Result	Competition
1	29 March 2006	Estadio Internacional, Malabo, Equatorial Guinea	Benin	1–0	2–0	Friendly
2	3 September 2006	Estadio Internacional, Malabo, Equatorial Guinea	Liberia	2–1	2–1	2008 Africa Cup of Nations qualification
3	21 November 2007	Estadio de Malabo, Malabo, Equatorial Guinea	Niger	1–1	1–1	Friendly
4	6 September 2008	National Stadium, Freetown, Sierra Leone	Sierra Leone	1–2	1–2	2010 World Cup qualification
