= Javier Arizmendi =

Spanish footballer (born 1984)

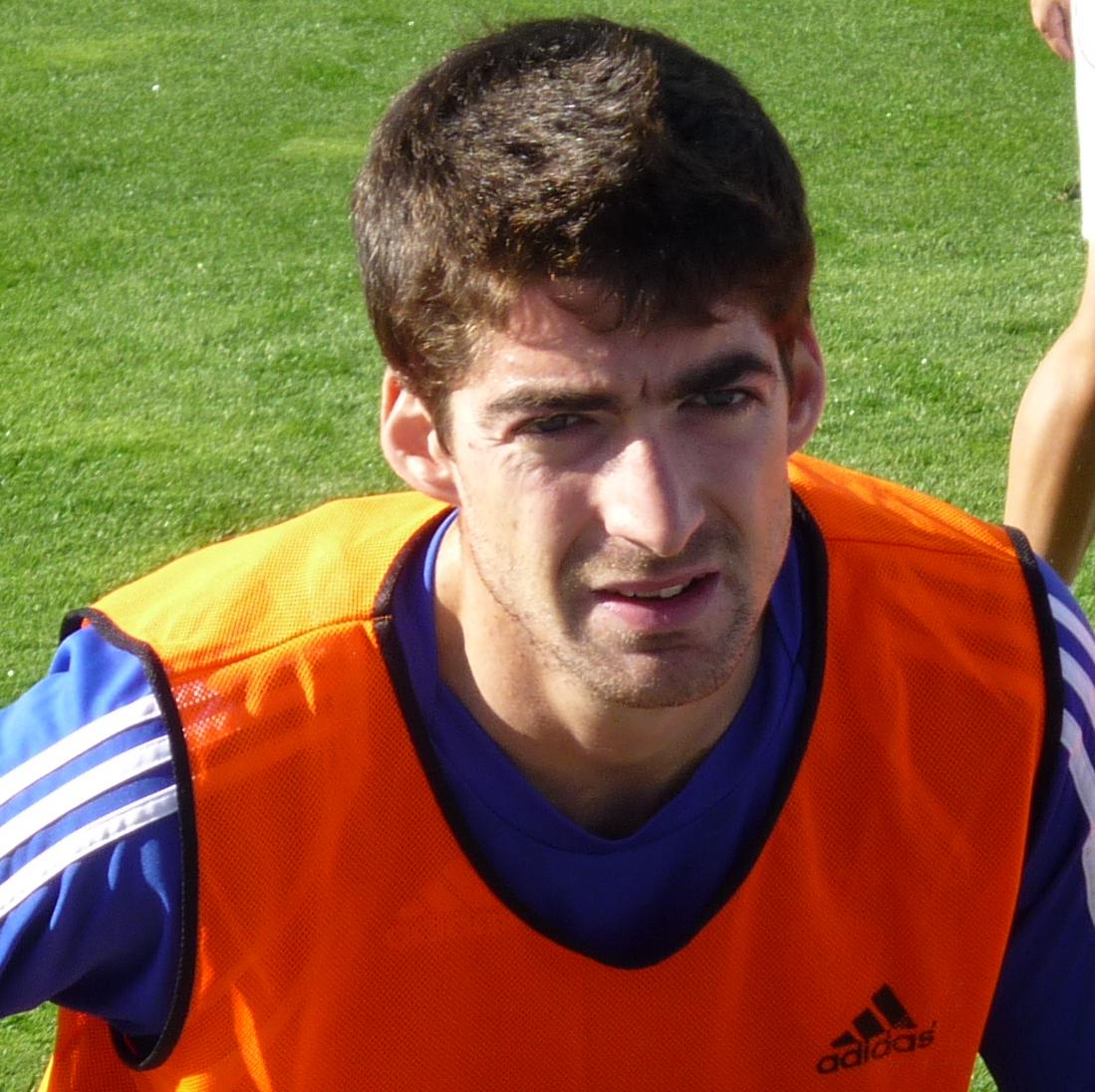
- Arizmendi as a Zaragoza player in 2009

Personal information
- Full name: Ángel Javier Arizmendi de Lucas
- Date of birth: 3 March 1984 (age 42)
- Place of birth: Madrid, Spain
- Height: 1.89 m (6 ft 2 in)
- Positions: Forward; winger

Youth career
- Atlético Madrid

Senior career*
Years	Team	Apps	(Gls)
2003–2004	Atlético Madrid B	28	(10)
2004–2006	Atlético Madrid	5	(0)
2004–2005	→ Racing Santander (loan)	22	(3)
2006–2007	Deportivo La Coruña	50	(7)
2007–2008	Valencia	30	(1)
2008–2010	Zaragoza	69	(14)
2010–2013	Getafe	22	(2)
2011–2012	→ Neuchâtel Xamax (loan)	13	(4)
2012–2013	→ Mallorca (loan)	21	(2)
2013–2015	Deportivo La Coruña	17	(2)
Total		277	(45)

International career
2003	Spain U20	5	(1)
2004–2006	Spain U21	8	(0)
2005	Spain U23	4	(1)
2007	Spain	1	(0)
- * Club domestic league appearances and goals

Ángel Javier Arizmendi de Lucas (born 3 March 1984) is a Spanish former professional footballer who played either as a forward or winger.

He played 181 La Liga matches over nine seasons, scoring a total of 20 goals for Atlético Madrid, Racing de Santander, Deportivo, Valencia, Zaragoza, Getafe and Mallorca.

All youth levels comprised, Arizmendi earned 13 caps for Spain. He appeared once with the full side.

== Club career ==
Born in Madrid, and a product of local Atlético Madrid's youth system, Arizmendi made his La Liga debut for the first team on 15 February 2004, in a 3–1 away loss against FC Barcelona. The following season, he went on loan to fellow top-division side Racing de Santander.

As opportunities were scarce at Atlético, Arizmendi was signed by Deportivo de La Coruña for €2 million, on 3 January 2006. The former club bought him back according to a clause in the contract but, on 21 June 2007, he joined Valencia CF on a six-year deal.

Arizmendi's physical style of play was occasionally put to use at right-back during 2007–08, due to injuries to habitual Miguel and Marco Caneira. On 23 March 2008, he scored his only Valencia goal in a 3–2 win at Real Madrid, while also helping the Che to the season's Copa del Rey.

On 12 August 2008, Arizmendi was signed by Real Zaragoza for roughly €4 million on a six-year contract. In his debut campaign, he was instrumental as the Aragonese returned to the top flight after just one year out, scoring nine times in the league alone.

On 30 June 2010, having helped Zaragoza to retain their status – 31 games, five goals, 2,064 minutes – Arizmendi signed for six years with Getafe CF, qualified for the UEFA Europa League. In August of the following year, however, after an unassuming season and the arrival of new manager Luis García, he moved to Neuchâtel Xamax FCS in Switzerland on a season-long loan.

Along three other teammates, Arizmendi was released from contract by the Super League team on 6 January 2012. He played his first match in his second spell on 4 February, appearing 24 minutes and being booked in a 0–1 home defeat against Real Madrid.

== International career ==
In 2003, without having played any football at the highest level, Arizmendi was called up to the Spain under-20 team that competed at the 2003 FIFA World Youth Championship in the United Arab Emirates, where he scored an extra time winner over Canada in the quarter-finals after coming on as a substitute. The nation went on to finish as runner-up.

Arizmendi made his debut for the senior side in a friendly against England on 7 February 2007, playing the final 25 minutes in a 1–0 victory at Old Trafford.

=== Controversy ===
During the 2005 Mediterranean Games, Arizmendi controversially celebrated the nation's gold medal carrying a Spanish flag which hailed from the days of Francisco Franco's fascist dictatorship. The player argued it was thrown from the stands at Estadio de los Juegos Mediterráneos, and that he did not notice the emblem on it.

== Personal life ==
After retiring in June 2015 aged 31, Arizmendi took a Master's degree in private banking. He subsequently worked as a financial adviser.

== Honours ==
Valencia

- Copa del Rey: 2007–08

Spain U20

- FIFA U-20 World Cup runner-up: 2003

Spain U23

- Mediterranean Games: 2005
