= Riki (footballer, born 1980) =

Spanish footballer

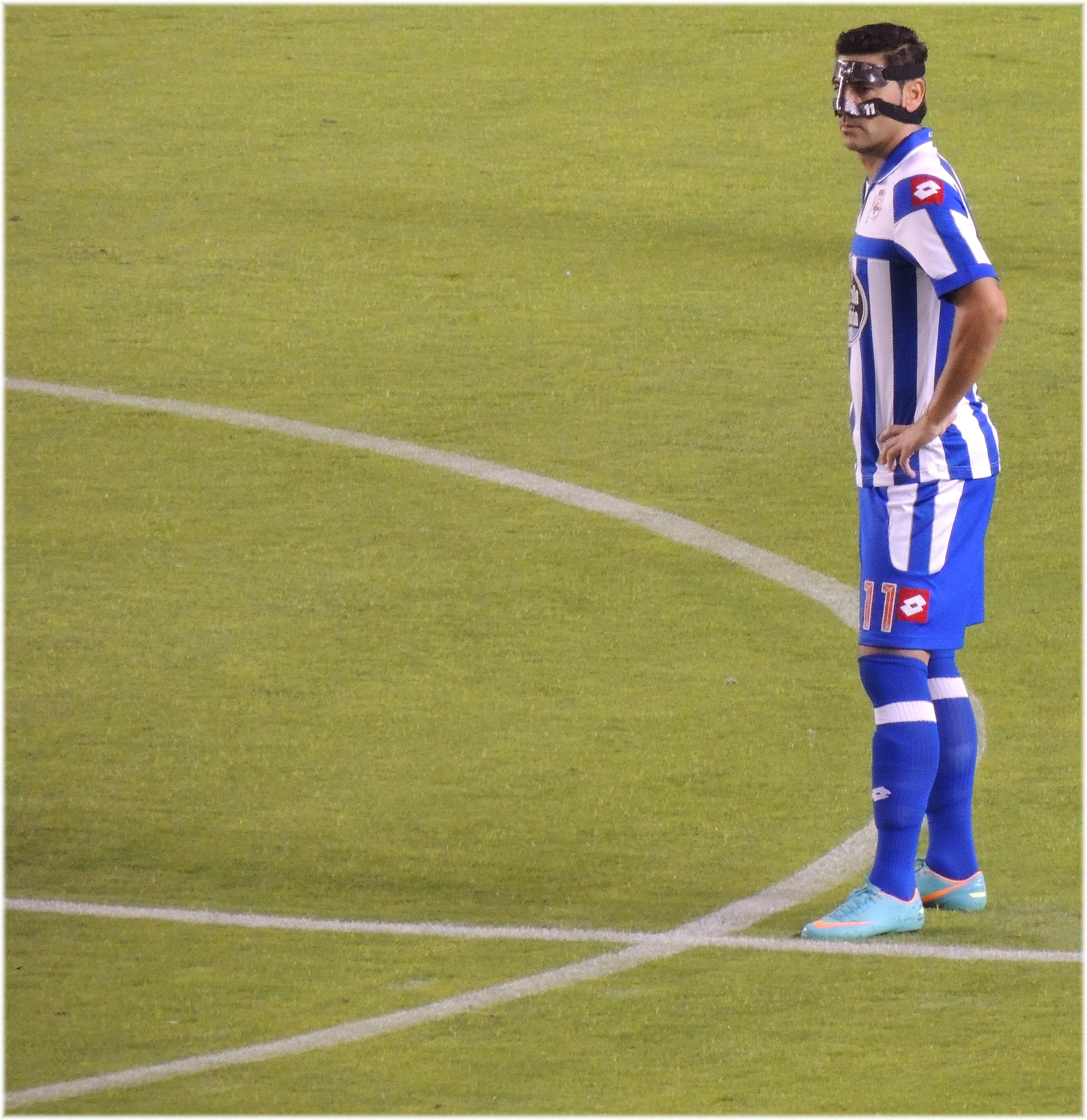
- Riki playing with Deportivo in 2012

Personal information
- Full name: Iván Sánchez-Rico Soto
- Date of birth: 11 August 1980 (age 46)
- Place of birth: Aranjuez, Spain
- Height: 1.87 m (6 ft 2 in)
- Position: Forward

Youth career
- 1986–1995: Loyola
- 1995–1999: Ancora Aranjuez

Senior career*
Years	Team	Apps	(Gls)
1999–2000	Aranjuez	8	(1)
2000–2002	Real Madrid C		
2002–2004	Real Madrid B	51	(20)
2004–2006	Getafe	61	(10)
2006–2013	Deportivo La Coruña	204	(52)
2013–2015	Granada	36	(2)
2015–2016	Guadalajara	11	(4)
Total		371	(89)
- * Club domestic league appearances and goals

Iván Sánchez-Rico Soto (born 11 August 1980), known as Riki, is a Spanish former professional footballer who played as a forward.

He spent most of his professional career with Deportivo, appearing in 226 competitive games and scoring 58 goals.

== Club career ==
=== Real Madrid ===
Riki was born in Aranjuez, Community of Madrid. After spending his youth career at amateur clubs in the area he played with both Real Madrid's reserve sides, C and B.

Riki's sole competitive appearance for the main squad occurred on 7 October 2003, as a late substitute for Guti in the 3–0 away win against UD San Sebastián de los Reyes in the round of 64 of the Copa del Rey.

=== Getafe ===
In July 2004, after having signed an extension the previous year, Riki was released and joined another team from the capital, Getafe CF, for a €300.000 fee. He made his La Liga debut on 12 September, in a 2–1 home defeat to RCD Mallorca.

On 13 March 2005, Riki scored against his former employers in a 2–1 home victory. In his second season, he netted eight league goals.

=== Deportivo ===
In late June 2006, Riki moved to Deportivo de La Coruña on a five-year contract. He was an undisputed starter during his first year and, the following campaign, he featured less prominently but scored two more goals (five).

In the first game of the 2008–09 season, against Real Madrid, Riki was stretchered off the pitch with a hamstring injury, after having subbed in himself. He was out of action for two weeks, subsequently netting on 2 November 2008 in a 3–0 away defeat of Real Betis.

Riki again suffered physical problems in the following season, but made the most of his 1,492 minutes as he scored eight goals, notably netting in the first round, a 3–2 loss at Real Madrid, and in both matches against Xerez CD (3–0 away, 2–1 at home); the Galicians eventually finished in tenth position.

After his team's relegation in 2011, Riki scored 14 times as they bounced back as champions of the second division, including early strikes in home and away victories over RC Celta de Vigo in the Galician derby.

=== Later career ===
When Deportivo were immediately relegated, Riki ended his seven-year tenure to remain in the top flight at Granada CF for the next three seasons. He did not score for the Andalusians until 14 December 2013 in a 2–0 win at Rayo Vallecano, and added only one more goal in a 3–3 draw on his return to Getafe.

On 31 August 2015, the 35-year-old Riki dropped down two levels to sign a two-year deal at CD Guadalajara. He left at the end of the campaign, however, having been relegated from Segunda División B.

== International career ==
Riki was not capped by Spain at any level. He played for the Madrid autonomous team on their Football Federation's centenary on 7 June 2013, scoring a penalty in a 2–1 loss to Andalusia in Vallecas.

== Honours ==
Deportivo

- UEFA Intertoto Cup: 2008
- Segunda División: 2011–12
