= Spain national youth football team =

The Spain national youth football teams are a group of eight teams that represents Spain in association football at various specific age levels, ranging from under-15 to under-23. All of the teams are controlled by Royal Spanish Football Federation, the governing body for football in Spain.

The eight teams are the following:

- Spain national under-23 football team
- Spain national under-21 football team
- Spain national under-20 football team
- Spain national under-19 football team
- Spain national under-18 football team
- Spain national under-17 football team
- Spain national under-16 football team
- Spain national under-15 football team
