= Miguel Ángel Lotina =

Spanish football manager (born 1957)

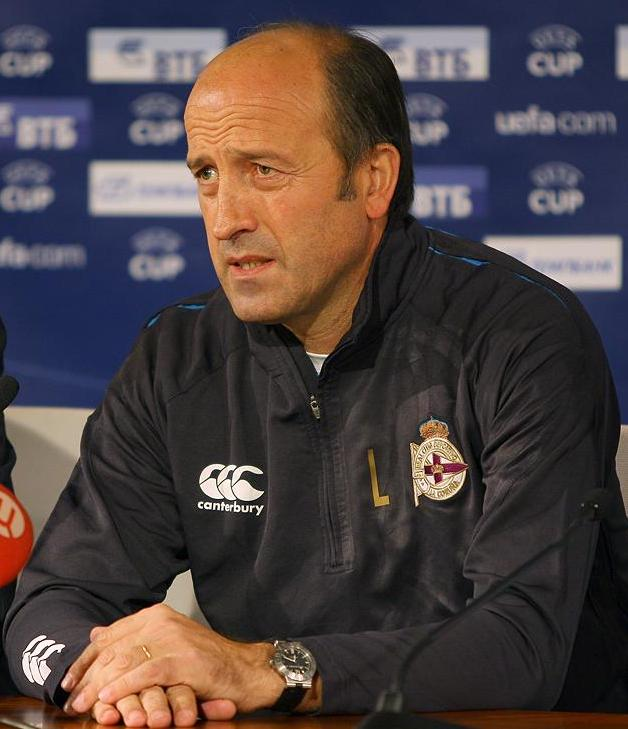
- Lotina manager of Deportivo in 2008

Personal information
- Full name: Miguel Ángel Lotina Oruechebarría
- Date of birth: 18 June 1957 (age 69)
- Place of birth: Meñaka, Spain
- Height: 1.76 m (5 ft 9 1/2 in)
- Position: Striker

Senior career*
Years	Team	Apps	(Gls)
1976–1977	Mungia		
1977–1978	Gernika		
1978–1981	Logroñés	113	(38)
1981–1983	Castellón	30	(3)
1983–1988	Logroñés	113	(48)

Managerial career
- 1990–1993: Logroñés B
- 1992: Logroñés
- 1993–1996: Numancia
- 1996: Logroñés
- 1997: Badajoz
- 1998–1999: Numancia
- 1999–2002: Osasuna
- 2002–2004: Celta
- 2004–2006: Espanyol
- 2006–2007: Real Sociedad
- 2007–2011: Deportivo La Coruña
- 2012: Villarreal
- 2013–2014: Omonia
- 2014: Al-Shahania
- 2015–2016: Al-Shahania
- 2016–2018: Tokyo Verdy
- 2019–2020: Cerezo Osaka
- 2021: Shimizu S-Pulse
- 2022: Vissel Kobe
- * Club domestic league appearances and goals

Miguel Ángel Lotina Oruechebarría (Spanish pronunciation: [miɣeˈlaŋxel loˈtina]; (Note: In isolation, Miguel and Ángel are pronounced [miˈɣel] and [ˈaŋxel] respectively.) born 18 June 1957) is a Spanish professional manager and former footballer who played as a striker.

His playing career was spent mostly with Logroñés, whom he represented in the Segunda División, also playing for Castellón in La Liga.

In a managerial career of over three decades, Lotina led seven clubs in the top flight, starting with Logroñés. He won the Copa del Rey with Espanyol in 2006 and the UEFA Intertoto Cup with Deportivo in 2008. He later worked in Cyprus, Qatar and for four teams in Japan.

== Playing career ==
Born in Meñaka, Biscay, Lotina started playing football with local Gernika Club, representing Castellón from 1981 to 1983. In his only season in La Liga he scored three goals in 21 games for the Valencians, who ranked 18th and last.

In summer 1983, Lotina signed with Logroñés. After netting 22 goals over two Segunda División seasons with the Riojan side – also representing them in Segunda División B – he contributed two in 14 matches in the 1986–87 campaign as the team promoted to the top flight for the first time ever, after finishing second to champions Valencia; he retired from the game in 1988 at the age of 31, without having appeared in the main division with his main club.

== Coaching career ==
=== Early years ===
After starting coaching with Logroñés' reserves, Lotina managed the club in two separate stints in the 90s (12 games). In 1995–96, whilst in charge of Numancia, he helped the third-tier team reach the quarter-finals of the Copa del Rey after ousting top-flight sides Real Sociedad, Racing de Santander and Sporting de Gijón before bowing out to eventual finalists Barcelona 5–3 on aggregate.

After his debut in the top division with Logroñés in the 1996–97 season, being one of five managers as they finished in 22nd and last position, Lotina's next years were spent in division two with Badajoz, Numancia and Osasuna, helping the second promote to the top flight for the first time ever in 1999 and the third achieve the same feat the following year after a six-year absence. He remained with the Navarrese for two further campaigns, as they consecutively retained their status.

=== Celta ===
Lotina led Celta de Vigo to their first participation in the UEFA Champions League in 2002–03 as the Galicians finished fourth. The following season, however, even though the team progressed through the group stage by notably defeating AC Milan 2–1 at the San Siro, he was sacked after 21 rounds in an eventual relegation.

=== Espanyol and Real Sociedad ===
In 2004–05, Lotina coached Espanyol to qualification for the UEFA Cup after finishing fifth. The year 2006 brought him his first football trophy, as the team won the domestic cup against Real Zaragoza (4–1) in the manager's second season.

Lotina returned to his native region in the 2006–07 campaign, replacing the dismissed José Mari Bakero at the helm of 20th-placed Real Sociedad, but the Basques were relegated from the first division for the first time in 40 years after ranking second-bottom.

=== Deportivo ===
For 2007–08, Lotina returned to Galicia and joined Deportivo de La Coruña. After a poor start, he more often than not switched to a 5–3–2 formation, going on to finish the year comfortably placed in mid-table and reach the UEFA Intertoto Cup, where they won 3–1 on aggregate against Israel's Bnei Sakhnin in the final.

Having advanced into the 2008–09 UEFA Cup, Lotina guided Deportivo through the group and expressed satisfaction at being drawn in the last 32 against Aalborg of Denmark. The Scandinavians won home and away, eliminating his team 6–1 on aggregate.

In March 2010, Lotina added one year to his contract that was set to expire. Depor were relegated in 2011 as the club also struggled financially; the side only managed to score nine goals away from home all year, being doomed in the last round after a 0–2 home loss against Valencia. On 23 May of that year, he announced his departure.

=== Villarreal ===
Lotina became Villarreal's third coach of the season on 19 March 2012, replacing José Francisco Molina following a 1–0 away defeat to Levante, with the team dangerously close to the relegation zone (17th), and eventually relegated as 18th, which meant that the reserves, which competed in the second tier, were also forced to drop down a level in June.

=== Abroad ===
On 21 June 2014, after a brief spell in the Cypriot First Division, Lotina was appointed head coach of newly promoted Qatar Stars League side Al-Shahania. Subsequently, he worked in Japan with Tokyo Verdy, Cerezo Osaka, Shimizu S-Pulse and Vissel Kobe.

== Managerial statistics ==
As of 26 June 2022

Managerial record by team and tenure
Team	Nat	From	To	Record								Ref
Team	Nat	From	To	G	W	D	L	GF	GA	GD	Win %	Ref
Logroñés B	(Spain)	30 June 1990	26 May 1993	118	43	39	36	133	131	+2	36.44	
Logroñés	(Spain)	3 December 1992	14 December 1992	2	0	0	2	1	5	−4	0.00	
Numancia	(Spain)	26 May 1993	20 May 1996	142	64	47	31	184	116	+68	45.07	
Logroñés	(Spain)	10 June 1996	28 October 1996	10	3	1	6	7	24	−17	30.00	
Badajoz	(Spain)	22 June 1997	1 December 1997	19	1	13	5	13	17	−4	5.26	
Numancia	(Spain)	30 June 1998	22 June 1999	48	23	13	12	77	47	+30	47.92	
Osasuna	(Spain)	23 June 1999	26 May 2002	130	46	33	51	141	152	−11	35.38	
Celta	(Spain)	26 May 2002	26 January 2004	80	30	25	25	103	96	+7	37.50	
Espanyol	(Spain)	11 June 2004	26 May 2006	92	35	27	30	113	116	−3	38.04	
Real Sociedad	(Spain)	27 October 2006	22 June 2007	32	9	9	14	29	34	−5	28.13	
Deportivo	(Spain)	25 June 2007	23 May 2011	182	67	45	70	195	225	−30	36.81	
Villarreal	(Spain)	19 March 2012	1 June 2012	11	3	5	3	12	12	+0	27.27	
Omonia	(Cyprus)	30 December 2013	7 February 2014	9	3	4	2	13	8	+5	33.33	
Al-Shahania	(Qatar)	22 June 2014	22 September 2014	2	0	1	1	1	5	−4	0.00	
Al-Shahania	(Qatar)	17 July 2015	30 June 2016	18	12	3	3	39	16	+23	66.67	
Tokyo Verdy	(Japan)	24 November 2016	10 December 2018	92	43	24	25	126	97	+29	46.74	
Cerezo Osaka	(Japan)	1 February 2019	31 January 2021	83	44	14	25	111	77	+34	53.01	
Shimizu S-Pulse	(Japan)	1 February 2021	3 November 2021	45	11	13	21	43	65	−22	24.44	
Vissel Kobe	(Japan)	8 April 2022	29 June 2022	15	6	3	6	25	17	+8	40.00	
Total				1,130	443	319	368	1,366	1,260	+106	39.20	—

== Honours ==
Espanyol

- Copa del Rey: 2005–06

Deportivo

- UEFA Intertoto Cup: 2008

== See also ==
- List of football managers with the most matches
