= Manuel Pablo =

Spanish footballer (born 1976)

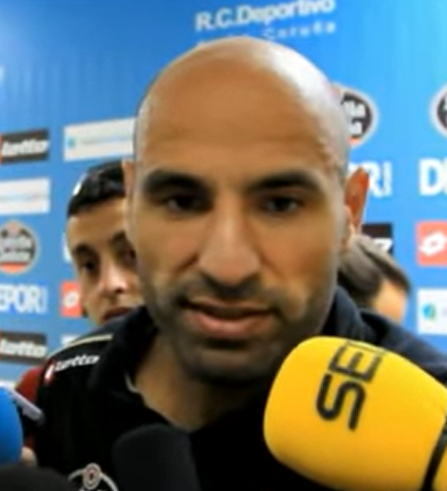
- Pablo in 2011

Personal information
- Full name: Manuel Pablo García Díaz
- Date of birth: 25 January 1976 (age 50)
- Place of birth: Arucas, Spain
- Height: 1.76 m (5 ft 9 in)
- Position: Right-back

Team information
- Current team: Deportivo B (manager)

Youth career
- Las Palmas

Senior career*
Years	Team	Apps	(Gls)
1994–1996	Las Palmas B	6	(2)
1994–1998	Las Palmas	57	(1)
1998–2016	Deportivo La Coruña	383	(1)
Total		446	(4)

International career
1997	Spain U21	1	(0)
1997	Spain U23	2	(0)
2000–2004	Spain	13	(0)

Managerial career
- 2018–2021: Deportivo B (assistant)
- 2021–2024: Deportivo La Coruña (youth)
- 2024–: Deportivo B
- * Club domestic league appearances and goals

Manuel Pablo García Díaz (born 25 January 1976), known as Manuel Pablo, is a Spanish former professional footballer who played mainly as a right-back. He is currently manager of Primera Federación club Deportivo Fabril.

With stamina as his main asset, he spent most of his career with Deportivo, appearing in 482 official matches and notably winning the 1999–2000 La Liga. He also represented Spain on 13 occasions.

== Club career ==
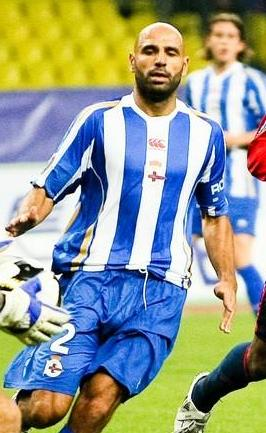
Pablo playing for Deportivo in 2008

Born in Arucas, Las Palmas, Canary Islands, Manuel Pablo was 22 when he joined Deportivo de La Coruña from his hometown club UD Las Palmas in summer 1998, being signed together with Argentine Turu Flores. He made his La Liga debut on 15 November 1998 in a 2–2 home draw against Deportivo Alavés, but faced serious competition from Armando Álvarez in his first season, appearing in just 14 league matches.

Manuel Pablo was a vital part of Depor's defence as the Galician side were crowned national champions in 2000 for the only time in their history. He contributed 37 games to the feat, 45 in all competitions.

On 30 September 2001, Manuel Pablo sustained an horrific tibia injury during the televised Galician derby against RC Celta de Vigo after an unlucky tackle by Everton Giovanella. Subsequently, he missed the rest of the campaign.

Manuel Pablo returned one year later, playing the full 90 minutes against CD Corralejo in a Copa del Rey tie. On 6 October 2002 he was handed his league return by coach Javier Irureta, as a late substitute in the 0–2 home loss to Racing de Santander.

In 2003–04's closing stages, Manuel Pablo proved he was fully recovered, as displayed in an excellent performance on 7 April 2004 in a 4–0 win over AC Milan in the quarter-finals of the UEFA Champions League (5–4 aggregate victory). From the 2004–05 season onwards, he was the undisputed right-back at the Estadio Riazor (although he faced stiff competition from Álvaro Arbeloa in the 2006–07 campaign until the latter departed for Liverpool in January 2007).

In the following two seasons, Manuel Pablo remained first-choice at his position, although he was challenged by younger Laure in 2008–09. In early May 2009, following lengthy negotiations, the 33-year-old renewed his Depor contract in a 2+1 deal.

From 2009 to 2015, Manuel Pablo still managed to total 126 league games, being relegated twice from the top flight and achieving as many promotions. On 16 June 2015, he extended his link for a further year.

On 7 July 2016, after only five competitive appearances during the season, the 40-year-old Manuel Pablo retired.

== International career ==
Manuel Pablo's performances for Deportivo earned him a debut with the Spain national team on 16 August 2000, in a 4–1 away friendly defeat to Germany. He played for his country a further 12 times.

== Coaching career ==
Shortly after retiring, Manuel Pablo continued to work with his main club Deportivo, being named an assistant to the B team in October 2018. In July 2021, he was appointed manager of the Juvenil squad, replacing Óscar Gilsanz.

Manuel Pablo became head coach of Deportivo's reserves on 5 November 2024, again taking over from Gilsanz. On 26 March 2026, with the side leading their group in the Segunda Federación, he renewed his contract until 2028; promotion was eventually achieved as champions.

== Career statistics ==
=== Club ===
Appearances and goals by club, season and competition
Club	Season	League			Cup		Other		Total	
Club	Season	Division	Apps	Goals	Apps	Goals	Apps	Goals	Apps	Goals
Las Palmas	1996–97	Segunda División	20	1	0	0	0	0	20	1
Las Palmas	1997–98	Segunda División	36	0	0	0	2	0	38	0
Las Palmas	Total		56	1	0	0	2	0	58	1
Deportivo	1998–99	La Liga	14	0	5	0	0	0	19	0
Deportivo	1999–00	La Liga	37	0	2	0	6	0	45	0
Deportivo	2000–01	La Liga	37	1	4	0	14	0	55	1
Deportivo	2001–02	La Liga	5	0	0	0	2	0	7	0
Deportivo	2002–03	La Liga	10	0	8	1	1	0	19	1
Deportivo	2003–04	La Liga	18	0	1	0	8	0	27	0
Deportivo	2004–05	La Liga	30	0	1	0	6	0	37	0
Deportivo	2005–06	La Liga	31	0	5	0	7	0	43	0
Deportivo	2006–07	La Liga	15	0	5	0	0	0	20	0
Deportivo	2007–08	La Liga	34	0	0	0	0	0	34	0
Deportivo	2008–09	La Liga	23	0	3	0	6	0	32	0
Deportivo	2009–10	La Liga	33	0	3	0	0	0	36	0
Deportivo	2010–11	La Liga	30	0	3	0	0	0	33	0
Deportivo	2011–12	Segunda División	8	0	2	0	0	0	10	0
Deportivo	2012–13	La Liga	24	0	2	1	0	0	26	1
Deportivo	2013–14	Segunda División	26	0	1	0	0	0	27	0
Deportivo	2014–15	La Liga	5	0	2	0	0	0	7	0
Deportivo	2015–16	La Liga	3	0	2	0	0	0	5	0
Deportivo	Total		383	1	49	2	50	0	482	3
Career total			439	2	49	2	52	0	540	4

=== International ===
Appearances and goals by national team and year
National team	Year	Apps	Goals
Spain	2000	5	0
Spain	2001	7	0
Spain	2004	1	0
Total		13	0

== Managerial statistics ==
As of 19 April 2026

Managerial record by team and tenure
Team	Nat	From	To	Record								Ref
Team	Nat	From	To	G	W	D	L	GF	GA	GD	Win %	Ref
Deportivo B	(Spain)	5 November 2024	Present	58	31	15	12	93	42	+51	53.45	
Total				58	31	15	12	93	42	+51	53.45	—

== Honours ==
Deportivo

- La Liga: 1999–2000
- Supercopa de España: 2000
- Segunda División: 2011–12
- UEFA Intertoto Cup: 2008
