= 2011–12 Valencia CF season =

94th season in existence of Valencia CF

Valencia
2011–12 season
- President: Manuel Llorente
- Head coach: Unai Emery
- Stadium: Mestalla
- La Liga: 3rd
- Copa del Rey: Semi-finals
- UEFA Champions League: Group stage
- UEFA Europa League: Semi-finals
- Top goalscorer: League: Roberto Soldado (17); All: Roberto Soldado (26)
- Highest home attendance: 51,800 vs Barcelona (1 February 2012)
- Lowest home attendance: 20,000 vs Getafe (29 October 2011)
- Average home league attendance: 38,314 (including Trofeu Taronja)
Home colours	Away colours	Third colours

The 2011–12 season was Valencia Club de Fútbol's 94th in existence and the club's 25th consecutive season in the top flight of Spanish football. The season was the fourth season of Unai Emery in front of team.

== Squad ==
=== Players ===
The numbers are established according to the official website: www.valenciacf.com

Note: Flags indicate national team as defined under FIFA eligibility rules; some limited exceptions apply. Players may hold more than one non-FIFA nationality.

No.	Pos.	Nation	Player
1	GK	BRA	Diego Alves
2	DF	ESP	Bruno
3	DF	NED	Hedwiges Maduro
4	DF	FRA	Adil Rami
5	MF	TUR	Mehmet Topal
6	MF	ESP	David Albelda (captain)
7	FW	BRA	Jonas
8	MF	ALG	Sofiane Feghouli
9	FW	ESP	Roberto Soldado (vice-captain)
10	MF	ARG	Éver Banega
11	FW	ESP	Aritz Aduriz
12	DF	ESP	Antonio Barragán

No.	Pos.	Nation	Player
13	GK	ESP	Vicente Guaita
14	MF	ARG	Pablo Piatti
15	DF	ESP	Ángel Dealbert
16	MF	ESP	Sergio Canales (on loan from Real Madrid)
17	DF	ESP	Jordi Alba
18	DF	ESP	Víctor Ruiz
19	MF	ESP	Pablo Hernández
20	DF	POR	Ricardo Costa
21	MF	ESP	Dani Parejo
22	DF	FRA	Jérémy Mathieu
23	DF	POR	Miguel
24	MF	ARG	Tino Costa

==== From Valencia Mestalla ====
Note: Flags indicate national team as defined under FIFA eligibility rules; some limited exceptions apply. Players may hold more than one non-FIFA nationality.

No.	Pos.	Nation	Player
27	FW	ESP	Paco Alcácer
28	MF	ESP	Juan Bernat
32	MF	ESP	Portu
43	GK	POR	Cristiano (on loan from Braga)

==== Out on loan ====
Note: Flags indicate national team as defined under FIFA eligibility rules; some limited exceptions apply. Players may hold more than one non-FIFA nationality.

No.	Pos.	Nation	Player
—	GK	ESP	Miguel Ángel Moyà (at Getafe)
—	MF	ESP	Míchel (at Hércules)
—	MF	ARG	Alejandro Domínguez (at River Plate)
—	MF	HON	Anthony Lozano (at Alcoyano)

=== Detailed squad information ===
Num	Pos	Nat	Name	Date of birth (age)	Place of birth	Date signed	Signed from	Contract expires	Int	Notes
Goalkeepers
1	GK	(Brazil)	Diego Alves	24 June 1985 (age 41)	Rio de Janeiro, Brazil	4 June 2011	(Spain) Almería	30 June 2015	Brazil	
13	GK	(Spain)	Vicente Guaita	18 February 1987 (age 39)	Torrent, Spain	2 October 2008 (d)	Youth system	30 June 2015		
25	GK	(Spain)	Miguel Ángel Moyà	2 April 1984 (age 42)	Binissalem, Spain	25 June 2009	(Spain) Mallorca	30 June 2013		Out on loan at Getafe
43	GK	(Portugal)	Cristiano	29 November 1990 (age 35)	Munich, Germany	25 July 2011	(Portugal) Braga	30 June 2012		On loan from Braga; Valencia Mestalla member
Defenders
2	RB	(Spain)	Bruno	1 October 1980 (age 45)	El Masnou, Spain	1 July 2009	(Spain) Almería	30 June 2012		
3	CB	(Netherlands)	Hedwiges Maduro	13 February 1985 (age 41)	Almere, Netherlands	18 January 2008	(Netherlands) Ajax Amsterdam	30 June 2012	Netherlands	
4	CB	(France)	Adil Rami	27 December 1985 (age 40)	Bastia, France	3 January 2011	(France) Lille	30 June 2014	France	
12	RB	(Spain)	Antonio Barragán	12 June 1987 (age 39)	Pontedeume, Spain	30 August 2011	(Spain) Valladolid	30 June 2015		
15	CB	(Spain)	Ángel Dealbert	1 January 1983 (age 43)	Benlloc, Spain	12 June 2009	(Spain) Castellón	30 June 2012		
17	LB	(Spain)	Jordi Alba	21 March 1989 (age 37)	L'Hospitalet de Llobregat, Spain	13 September 2009 (d)	Youth system	30 June 2013	Spain	
18	CB	(Spain)	Víctor Ruiz	25 January 1989 (age 37)	Esplugues de Llobregat, Spain	30 August 2011	(Italy) Napoli	30 June 2016		
20	CB	(Portugal)	Ricardo Costa	27 August 1981 (age 45)	Vila Nova de Gaia, Portugal	17 May 2010	(Germany) Wolfsburg	30 June 2014	Portugal	
22	LB	(France)	Jérémy Mathieu	29 October 1983 (age 42)	Luxeuil-les-Bains, France	10 June 2009	(France) Toulouse	30 June 2013	France	
23	RWB	(Portugal)	Miguel	4 January 1980 (age 46)	Lisbon, Portugal	19 August 2005	(Portugal) Benfica	30 June 2012	Portugal	
Midfielders
5	DM	(Turkey)	Mehmet Topal	3 March 1986 (age 40)	Malatya, Turkey	12 May 2010	(Turkey) Galatasaray	30 June 2014	Turkey	
6	DM	(Spain)	David Albelda	1 September 1977 (age 49)	La Pobla Llarga, Spain	15 March 1998 (d)	Youth system	30 June 2013	Spain	
7	AM	(Brazil)	Jonas	1 April 1984 (age 42)	Bebedouro, Brazil	24 January 2011	(Brazil) Grêmio	30 June 2015	Brazil	
8	AM	(Algeria)	Sofiane Feghouli	26 December 1989 (age 36)	Levallois-Perret, France	23 May 2010	(France) Grenoble	30 June 2014	Algeria	
10	CM	(Argentina)	Éver Banega	29 June 1988 (age 38)	Rosario, Argentina	5 January 2008	(Argentina) Boca Juniors	30 June 2015	Argentina	
14	LW	(Argentina)	Pablo Piatti	31 March 1989 (age 37)	Ucacha, Argentina	6 July 2011	(Spain) Almería	30 June 2016	Argentina	
16	AM	(Spain)	Sergio Canales	16 February 1991 (age 35)	Santander, Spain	30 July 2011	(Spain) Real Madrid	30 June 2013		On loan from Real Madrid
19	RW	(Spain)	Pablo Hernández	11 April 1985 (age 41)	Castelló de la Plana, Spain	16 June 2008	(Spain) Getafe	30 June 2014	Spain	Originally from youth system
21	CM	(Spain)	Dani Parejo	16 April 1989 (age 37)	Coslada, Spain	14 June 2011	(Spain) Getafe	30 June 2016		
24	CM	(Argentina)	Tino Costa	9 January 1985 (age 41)	Las Flores, Argentina	1 July 2010	(France) Montpellier	30 June 2014	Argentina	
28	LW	(Spain)	Juan Bernat	1 March 1993 (age 33)	Cullera, Spain	27 August 2011 (d)	Youth system	30 June 2015		Valencia Mestalla member
–	AM	(Spain)	Míchel	29 July 1988 (age 38)	Burjassot, Spain	29 October 2008 (d)	Youth system	30 June 2013		Out on loan at Hércules
–	AM	(Argentina)	Alejandro Domínguez	10 June 1981 (age 45)	Lanús, Argentina	14 December 2009	(Russia) Rubin Kazan	30 June 2013		Out on loan at River Plate
Forwards
9	ST	(Spain)	Roberto Soldado	27 May 1985 (age 41)	Valencia, Spain	10 June 2010	(Spain) Getafe	30 June 2014	Spain	
11	ST	(Spain)	Aritz Aduriz	11 February 1981 (age 45)	San Sebastián, Spain	14 July 2010	(Spain) Mallorca	30 June 2014	Spain	
27	ST	(Spain)	Paco Alcácer	30 August 1993 (age 33)	Torrent, Spain	11 November 2010 (d)	Youth system	30 June 2016		Valencia Mestalla member

Notes: (d), debut in first team in an official match

=== Transfers ===
==== In ====
No.	Pos.	Nat.	Name	Age	EU	Moving from	Type	Transfer window	Ends	Transfer fee	Source
1	GK	(Brazil)	Alves	25	Non-EU	Almería	Transfer	Summer	2015	€3,000,000	Valenciacf.com
21	MF	(Spain)	Parejo	22	EU	Getafe	Transfer	Summer	2016	€6,000,000	Valenciacf.com
4	DF	(France)	Rami	25	EU	Lille (France)	Loan return	Summer	2015	N/A	Valenciacf.com
8	AM	(France)	Feghouli	21	EU	Almería	Loan return	Summer	2014	N/A	Valenciacf.com
	LB	(Spain)	Aarón	23	EU	Recreativo	Loan return	Summer	2012	N/A	
	LB	(Spain)	Del Horno	30	EU	Levante	Loan return	Summer	2012	N/A	
	AM	(Spain)	Míchel	22	EU	Deportivo La Coruña	Loan return	Summer	2013	N/A	
	DM	(Nigeria)	Sunny	22	EU	Numancia	Loan return	Summer	2013	N/A	
	GK	(Brazil)	Renan	26	Non-EU	Internacional (Brazil)	Loan return	Summer	2013	N/A	
	MF	(Portugal)	Fernandes	25	EU	Beşiktaş (Turkey)	Loan return	Summer	2013	N/A	
14	MF	(Argentina)	Piatti	22	EU	Almería	Transfer	Summer	2016	€7,500,000	Valenciacf.com
43	GK	(Portugal)	Cristiano	20	EU	Braga	Loan	Summer	2012	N/A	Valenciacf.com
16	AM	(Spain)	Canales	20	EU	Real Madrid	Loan	Summer	2013	€1,000,000	Valenciacf.com
	FW	(Honduras)	Lozano	18	Non-EU	Olimpia (Honduras)	Loan	Summer	2012	€100,000	Superdeporte
18	DF	(Spain)	Víctor Ruiz	22	EU	Napoli (Italy)	Transfer	Summer	2016	€8,000,000	Valenciacf.com
12	RB	(Spain)	Barragán	24	EU	Valladolid	Transfer	Summer	2015	€1,800,000	Valenciacf.com

Total expenditure: ▼€27,400,000

==== Out ====
No.	Pos.	Nat.	Name	Age	EU	Moving to	Type	Transfer window	Transfer fee	Source
14	LW	(Spain)	Vicente	29	EU	Brighton & Hove Albion (England)	End of contract	Summer	Free	Valenciacf.com
1	GK	(Spain)	César	39	EU	Villarreal	End of contract	Summer	Free	Valenciacf.com
7	RW	(Spain)	Joaquín	29	EU	Málaga	Transfer	Summer	€4,500,000	Valenciacf.com
17	CB	(Lithuania)	Stankevičius	29	EU	Sampdoria (Italy)	Loan return	Summer	N/A	
25	GK	(Spain)	Moyà	27	EU	Getafe	Loan	Summer	N/A	Nostresport.com
	MF	(Portugal)	Fernandes	25	EU	Beşiktaş (Turkey)	Transfer	Summer	€2,000,000	Valenciacf.com
4	DF	(Spain)	David Navarro	31	EU	Neuchâtel Xamax (Switzerland)	Contract cancellation	Summer	Free	Valenciacf.com
	AM	(Spain)	Míchel	22	EU	Hércules	Loan	Summer	N/A	Marca.com
29	MF	(Spain)	Isco	19	EU	Málaga	Transfer	Summer	€6,000,000	Valenciacf.com
	LB	(Spain)	Del Horno	30	EU	Levante	Contract cancellation	Summer	N/A	Valenciacf.com
	MF	(Spain)	Aarón	22	EU	Almería	Contract cancellation	Summer	Free	Valenciacf.com
	GK	(Brazil)	Renan	26	Non-EU	Internacional (Brazil)	Contract cancellation	Summer	Free	Valenciacf.com
	MF	(Nigeria)	Sunday	22	Non-EU	Numancia	Contract cancellation	Summer	Free	Valenciacf.com
8	FW	(Argentina)	Domínguez	30	EU	River Plate (Argentina)	Loan	Summer	N/A	Valenciacf.com
12	MF	(Uruguay)	González	29	Non-EU	Standard Liège (Belgium)	Contract cancellation	Summer	Free	Valenciacf.com
	FW	(Honduras)	Lozano	18	Non-EU	Alcoyano	Loan	Summer	N/A	Superdeporte
10	LW	(Spain)	Mata	23	EU	Chelsea (England)	Transfer	Summer	€28,000,000	As.com

Total income: ▲€40,500,000

== Club ==
=== Current technical staff ===
Position	Staff
Head coach	Unai Emery
Assistant coach	Juan Carlos Carcedo
Technical staff analyst	Juan José Vila Seoane
Goalkeeping coach	José Manuel Ochotorena
Physical coach	Julen Massach Urrestilla
2nd Physical coach	Juan José Torrijo Navarro
Delegate	Voro
Kit manager	Bernardo España Edo 'Españeta'
Kit manager	José Manuel López
Kit manager	Vicente Navarro Navarro 'Serreta'
Kit manager	Iván Montero Rodríguez
Kit manager	Vicente Ventura Deval

Source: Valencia CF Official Website

== Statistics ==
=== Player stats ===
Player	Total	La Liga	Copa del Rey	Champions League	Europa League	Notes

N	P	Name	Nat.	GS	App	Goals	Min	App	Goals	App	Goals	App	Goals	App	Goals	Notes
1	GK	Diego Alves	(Brazil)	30	30	-42	2700	12	-19	6	-6	6	-7	6	-10	
2	RB	Bruno	(Spain)	14	18		1176	14		1				3		
3	CB	Hedwiges Maduro	(Netherlands)	4	8		398	7						1		
4	CB	Adil Rami	(France)	52	53	6	4744	33	2	7		6	1	7	3	
5	DM	Mehmet Topal	(Turkey)	22	30	2	2105	20		1		3		6	2	
6	DM	David Albelda	(Spain)	32	34		2706	21		7		3		3		
7	AM	Jonas	(Brazil)	41	54	19	3506	34	10	7	4	5	3	8	2	
8	AM	Sofiane Feghouli	(Algeria)	37	49	6	3163	30	6	6		6		7		
9	ST	Roberto Soldado	(Spain)	45	51	26	3886	32	17	6	3	6	5	7	1	
10	CM	Éver Banega	(Argentina)	22	25	1	1799	13		8	1	4				Source
11	ST	Aritz Aduriz	(Spain)	17	45	9	1991	29	7	6	1	4	1	6		
12	RB	Antonio Barragán	(Spain)	23	26		2137	18		3		1		4		
13	GK	Vicente Guaita	(Spain)	30	30	-25	2700	26	-25	2				2		
14	LW	Pablo Piatti	(Argentina)	23	47	6	2099	30	2	7	3	4		6	1	
15	CB	Ángel Dealbert	(Spain)	16	16		1440	11		1				4		
16	AM	Sergio Canales	(Spain)	8	16	1	781	11	1			3		2		Source
17	LB	Jordi Alba	(Spain)	44	50	3	3976	32	2	8		4		6	1	
18	CB	Víctor Ruiz	(Spain)	37	37	2	3255	22		7	1	6		2	1	
19	RW	Pablo Hernández	(Spain)	30	45	4	2739	30	2	5		6	1	4	1	
20	CB	Ricardo Costa	(Portugal)	17	18	1	1483	12		1				5	1	
21	CM	Dani Parejo	(Spain)	18	30		1645	16		6		3		5		
22	LB	Jérémy Mathieu	(France)	43	50		3805	31		6		6		7		Source
23	RWB	Miguel	(Portugal)	21	22	1	1833	11	1	5		5		1		
24	CM	Tino Costa	(Argentina)	31	41	7	2953	27	5	5	1	3	1	6		
27	ST	Paco Alcácer	(Spain)		3		37	3								
28	LW	Juan Bernat	(Spain)	3	10		297	7		1				2		
32	CM	Portu	(Spain)													
43	GK	Cristiano	(Portugal)													

Source: Match reports in competitive matches, ValenciaCF.com, LFP.es
Ordered by shirt number
0 shown as blank

Goals for goalkeepers are goals against

=== Disciplinary record ===
Includes all competitive matches. The list is sorted by shirt number.

N	P	Nat.	Name	La Liga			Copa del Rey			Champions League			Europa League			Total			Notes
N	P	Nat.	Name	Yellow card	Second yellow card	Red card	Yellow card	Second yellow card	Red card	Yellow card	Second yellow card	Red card	Yellow card	Second yellow card	Red card	Yellow card	Second yellow card	Red card	Notes
1	GK	(Brazil)	Diego Alves	3			2						2			7			
2	DF	(Spain)	Bruno	5									1			6			
3	DF	(Netherlands)	Hedwiges Maduro	1												1			
4	DF	(France)	Adil Rami	10		1	2						2		1	14		2	
5	MF	(Turkey)	Mehmet Topal	4												4			
6	MF	(Spain)	David Albelda	10		1	3			2						15		1	
7	FW	(Brazil)	Jonas	4			2									6			
8	MF	(Algeria)	Sofiane Feghouli	8	1		4	1					1			13	2		
9	FW	(Spain)	Roberto Soldado	11			2			1			3			17			
10	MF	(Argentina)	Éver Banega	3			2			2						7			
11	FW	(Spain)	Aritz Aduriz	5		1	1						2			8		1	
12	DF	(Spain)	Antonio Barragán	6									3			9			
13	GK	(Spain)	Vicente Guaita	1												1			
14	MF	(Argentina)	Pablo Piatti	3			1									4			
15	DF	(Spain)	Ángel Dealbert	1									2			3			
16	MF	(Spain)	Sergio Canales	1												1			
17	DF	(Spain)	Jordi Alba	13		1	2						2			17		1	
18	DF	(Spain)	Víctor Ruiz	7			4			2						13			
19	MF	(Spain)	Pablo Hernández	5												5			
20	DF	(Portugal)	Ricardo Costa	4		1										4		1	
21	MF	(Spain)	Dani Parejo	4												4			
22	DF	(France)	Jérémy Mathieu	5			3			2			1			11			
23	DF	(Portugal)	Miguel	3			1									4			
24	MF	(Argentina)	Tino Costa	12		1	1			2			2			17		1	
27	FW	(Spain)	Paco Alcácer																
28	MF	(Spain)	Juan Bernat																
32	MF	(Spain)	Portu																
43	GK	(Portugal)	Cristiano																

Source: Competitive matches and ValenciaCF.com, LFP.es
Ordered by (red card) , (second yellow card) and (yellow card)
(yellow card) = Number of bookings; (second yellow card) = Number of sending offs after a second yellow card; (red card) = Number of sending offs by a direct red card.

== Pre-season and friendlies ==
19 July 2011 Kärnten Cup (ESL)	Valencia (Spain)	2–0	(Netherlands) PSV	Wolfsberg, Austria
18:30 CEST	Soldado (yellow card) 40'; Aduriz (yellow card) 55', (goal) 78'; Piatti 68'	VCF Report; SD Report; AS Report; Live TV: Gol T	Toivonen (yellow card) 50'; Strootman (yellow card) 64'; Manolev (yellow card) 70'	Stadium: Lavanttal Arena; Attendance: 2,000; Referee: Manfred Krassnitzer (Austria)

23 July 2011 Kärnten Cup (ESL)	Valencia (Spain)	1–0	(England) Leicester City	Sankt Veit an der Glan, Austria
18:30 CEST	Jonas 22'	VCF Report; SD Report; AS Report; Live TV: Gol T		Stadium: Jacques Lemans Arena; Attendance: 1,000; Referee: Gerhard Meschnark (Austria)
Note: Kärnten Soccer Cup winner: Valencia (Points: Valencia 6 pts, Bursaspor 2 pts, Leicester City 1 pt, PSV Eindhoven 1 pt)

26 July 2011 Summer League	Rapid Wien (Austria)	4–1	(Spain) Valencia	Vienna, Austria
19:00 CEST	Alar 23'; Kulovits (yellow card) 40'; Schrammel 41', (yellow card) 69'; Katzer (yellow card) 58'; Gartler 74', 83'	VCF Report; SD Report; AS Report; Live TV: Gol T	Portu (yellow card) 16'; Parejo (yellow card) 25'; Mata (yellow card) 34'; Hernández (yellow card) 53', (goal) 89'; Mathieu (yellow card) 56'; Soldado (red card) 61'; Miguel (yellow card) 61'	Stadium: Gerhard Hanappi Stadium; Attendance: 8,000; Referee: Harald Ruiss (Austria)

30 July 2011 Presentation	Sporting CP (Portugal)	0–3	(Spain) Valencia	Lisbon, Portugal
20:30 WEST		VCF Report; SD Report; AS Report; Live TV: Gol T	Bernat 4'; Soldado 31'; Piatti 41'	Stadium: José Alvalade; Attendance: 48,952; Referee: Pedro Proença (Portugal)

2 August 2011 Summer of Champions	Hamburger SV (Germany)	1–2	(Spain) Valencia	Hamburg, Germany
19:15 CEST	Behrens 87'	VCF Report; SD Report; AS Report; Live TV: Gol T, Sport1	Mata 4'; Bernat 70'	Stadium: Imtech Arena; Attendance: 34,000; Referee: Babak Rafati (Germany)

6 August 2011 Presentation	Liverpool (England)	2–0	(Spain) Valencia	Liverpool, England
17:30 WEST	Carroll 6', (yellow card) 29'; Kyrgiakos 89'	VCF Report; SD Report; AS Report; Live TV: Gol T	Albelda (yellow card) 33'; Bruno (yellow card) 41'	Stadium: Anfield; Attendance: 40,000; Referee: Martin Atkinson (England)

12 August 2011 Trofeu Taronja	Valencia (Spain)	3–0	(Italy) Roma	Valencia, Spain
22:00 CEST	Viviani 21' (o.g.); Soldado 36', (yellow card) 55'; Bernat (yellow card) 50'; Rami (yellow card) 75'; Alcácer 83'	VCF Report; SD Report; AS Report; Live TV: Gol T	Borriello (yellow card) 29'; Cassetti (yellow card) 55'; Viviani (yellow card) 67'	Stadium: Mestalla; Attendance: 45,000; Referee: Miguel Ayza Gámez (Spain, Valencian Committee)
Note: Orange Trophy winner: Valencia

14 August 2011 Memorial; Juan Rojas	Almería (Spain)	0–0 (3–1 p)	(Spain) Valencia	Almería, Spain
19:00 CEST	Bernardello (yellow card) 32'	VCF Report; SD Report; AS Report	Miguel (yellow card) 12'; Parejo (yellow card) 51'; Aduriz (yellow card) 79' (yellow-red card) 79'	Stadium: Juegos Mediterráneos; Attendance: 4,813; Referee: Pino Zamorano (Spain, Castilian-Manchego Committee)
	Penalties
	Verza (penalty scored); Corona (penalty missed); Rafita (penalty scored); Bautista (penalty scored)		(penalty missed) Soldado; (penalty missed) T. Costa; (penalty scored) Bruno; (penalty missed) Rami
Note: Memorial Juan Rojas Trophy winner: Almería

1 September 2011 Todos con Lorca; Beneficial Triangular	Málaga (Spain)	0–2	(Spain) Valencia	Murcia, Spain
22:00 CEST		VCF Report; SD Report	Jonas 12'; Feghouli 35'; Barragán (yellow card) 36'	Stadium: Nueva Condomina; Attendance: 6,847; Referee: Fernández Borbalán (Spain, Andalusian Committee)

1 September 2011 Todos con Lorca; Beneficial Triangular	Villarreal (Spain)	0–0	(Spain) Valencia	Murcia, Spain
23:00 CEST	Rodríguez (red card) 14'	VCF Report; SD Report; AS Report	Barragán (yellow card) 5'	Stadium: Nueva Condomina; Attendance: 6,847; Referee: Fernández Borbalán (Spain, Andalusian Committee)
Note: Todos con Lorca: triangular benéfico winner: Valencia (Points: Valencia 4 pts, Málaga 2 pts, Villarreal 2pts)

24 May 2012 U.S. Tour	Portland Timbers (United States)	0–1	(Spain) Valencia	Portland, USA
4:30 CEST	Horst (yellow card) 31'	VCF Report; SD Report; AS Report; MARCA Report	Aduriz 40'; Pardo (yellow card) 63'	Stadium: Jeld-Wen Field; Attendance: 19,564; Referee: Allen Chapman (United States)

1 June 2012 Dynamo Charities; Cup; U.S. Tour	Houston Dynamo (United States)	1–2	(Spain) Valencia	Houston, USA
2:30 CEST	Carr 14'	VCF Report; SD Report; AS Report; MARCA Report	Aduriz 2', 17'	Stadium: BBVA Compass Stadium; Attendance: 22,039; Referee: Jason Anno (United States)
Note: Dynamo Charities Cup winner: Valencia

== Competitions ==
=== Overall ===
Competition	Started round	Current position / round	Final position / round	First match	Last match
La Liga	—	—	3rd	27 August 2011	12 May 2012
Copa del Rey	Round of 32	—	Semi-finals	13 December 2011	8 February 2012
UEFA Champions League	Group stage	—	Group Stage	13 September 2011	6 December 2011
UEFA Europa League	Round of 32	—	Semi-finals	16 February 2012	26 April 2012

Source: Competitions

=== Overall Friendly Trophies ===
Trophy	Organizer	Type	Result	Place	First match	Last match
I Kärnten Soccer Cup	European Summer League / Carinthia	League non-Round Robin	Winners	Carinthia (Austria)	19 July 2011	23 July 2011
XL Trofeu Taronja	Valencia	One match trophy	Winners	Mestalla, Valencia (Spain)	12 August 2011	
VIII Trofeo Memorial Juan Rojas	Almería	One match trophy	Runners-up	Juegos Mediterráneos, Almería (Spain)	14 August 2011	
Todos con Lorca, trofeo benéfico	Ayuntamiento de Lorca	Triangular	Winners	Nueva Condomina, Murcia (Spain)	1 September 2011	
IV Dynamo Charities Cup	Houston Dynamo	One match trophy	Winners	BBVA Compass Stadium, Houston (USA)	1 June 2012	

Source: Fiendlies

=== Qualifying for next season competitions ===
Competition	Organizer	Reason	Date assured	Starting round
2012–13 Copa del Rey	RFEF	As member of 2011–12 La Liga	22 July 2011	Round of 32
2012–13 La Liga	LFP, RFEF	As one of 17 best 2011–12 La Liga teams	11 April 2012	–
2012–13 UEFA Champions League	UEFA	As 2011–12 La Liga 3rd team	2 May 2012	Group stage

=== La Liga ===
==== League table ====
Pos	Team	Pld	W	D	L	GF	GA	GD	Pts	Qualification or relegation
1	Real Madrid (C)	38	32	4	2	121	32	+89	100	Qualification for the Champions League group stage
2	Barcelona	38	28	7	3	114	29	+85	91	Qualification for the Champions League group stage
3	Valencia	38	17	10	11	59	44	+15	61	Qualification for the Champions League group stage
4	Málaga	38	17	7	14	54	53	+1	58	Qualification for the Champions League play-off round
5	Atlético Madrid	38	15	11	12	53	46	+7	56	Qualification for the Europa League group stage (Note: Atlético Madrid won the 2011–12 UEFA Europa League and thus secured the title holder spot in the group stage of the 2012–13 UEFA Europa League.)

Source: ESPN
Rules for classification: 1st points; 2nd head-to-head points; 3rd head-to-head goal difference; 4th head-to-head goals scored; 5th goal difference; 6th number of goals scored; 7th Fair-play points
(C) Champions

==== Results summary ====
Overall								Home						Away					
Pld	W	D	L	GF	GA	GD	Pts	W	D	L	GF	GA	GD	W	D	L	GF	GA	GD
38	17	10	11	59	44	+15	61	11	4	4	40	20	+20	6	6	7	19	24	−5

Source: Matches

==== Results by round ====
Round	2	3	4	5	6	7	8	9	10	11	12	13	14	15	16	17	18	19	1	21	22	23	24	25	26	27	28	29	29	31	32	33	34	35	36	20	37	38
Ground	H	H	A	H	A	H	A	H	A	H	A	H	A	H	A	H	A	H	A	A	A	H	A	H	A	H	A	H	A	H	A	H	A	H	A	H	H	A
Result	W	W	W	D	L	W	D	D	W	W	W	L	W	W	L	W	D	L	D	D	D	W	L	L	W	D	W	L	L	D	D	W	L	W	L	W	W	L
Position	3	2	1	2	7	5	5	5	4	4	3	3	3	3	3	3	3	3	3	3	3	3	3	3	3	3	3	3	3	3	4	3	3	3	3	3	3	3

Source: ValenciaCF.es
A = Away; H = Home; W = Win; D = Draw; L = Loss

==== Matches ====
22 January 2012 1	Osasuna	1–1	Valencia	Pamplona
12:00 CET	Lolo 90+2'		84' Soldado	Stadium: El Sadar; Attendance: 17,359; Referee: Fernando Teixeira Vitienes
Note: Postponed due to AFE strike after failing to reach a collective bargaining agreement with the LFP.

27 August 2011 2	Valencia	4–3	Racing Santander	Valencia
20:00 (CEST)	Soldado 1', 87', 89'; Banega (yellow card) 19'; Alba (yellow card) 43'; Rami 57'; T. Costa (yellow card) 73'	Report; VCF Report; SD Report; AS Report; Live TV: Gol T /	Soldado 6' (o.g.); Acosta 14'; Diop (yellow card) 31'; Toño (yellow card) 43'; Adrián 55'; Álvaro (yellow card) 89'	Stadium: Mestalla; Attendance: 48,000; Referee: Xavier Estrada Fernández (Catalonia)

10 September 2011 3	Valencia	1–0	Atlético Madrid	Valencia
22:00 (CEST)	Soldado 52', (yellow card) 52'	Report; VCF Report; SD Report; AS Report; Live TV: / TV3 / TM / / A7	Suárez (yellow card) 40'; Tiago (yellow card) 60'	Stadium: Mestalla; Attendance: 40,000; Referee: José González González (Castile and León)

17 September 2011 4	Sporting Gijón	0–1	Valencia	Gijón
18:00 (CEST)	Rivera (yellow card) 70'	Report; VCF Report; SD Report; AS Report; Live TV: Gol T /	Soldado 29'; Alba (yellow card) 68'; Ruiz (yellow card) 77'; Hernández (yellow card) 78'; Bruno (yellow card) 83'; Piatti (yellow card) 88'	Stadium: El Molinón; Attendance: 20,000; Referee: Carlos Delgado Ferreiro (Basque Country)

21 September 2011 5	Valencia	2–2	Barcelona	Valencia
22:00 (CEST)	Abidal 12' (o.g.); Rami (yellow card) 16'; Miguel 19'; Soldado (yellow card) 36'; Canales (yellow card) 52'; Jonas (yellow card) 86'; Alba (red card) 89'	Report; VCF Report; SD Report; AS Report; Live TV: / TV3 / TM / / A7	Pedro 13'; Fàbregas 77'; Mascherano (yellow card) 87'	Stadium: Mestalla; Attendance: 50,000; Referee: Carlos Velasco Carballo (Community of Madrid)

24 September 2011 6	Sevilla	1–0	Valencia	Seville
18:00 (CEST)	Kanouté 17'; Trochowski (yellow card) 47' (yellow-red card) 56'; Escudé (red card) 68'; Spahić (yellow card) 70'; Rakitić (yellow card) 85'	Report; VCF Report; SD Report; AS Report; Live TV:	T. Costa (yellow card) 24'; Aduriz (yellow card) 60', (red card) 70'; Rami (yellow card) 89'	Stadium: Estadio Ramón Sánchez Pizjuán; Attendance: 35,000; Referee: César Muñiz Fernández (Asturias)

1 October 2011 7	Valencia	1–0	Granada	Valencia
20:00 (CEST)	Canales 4'; Mathieu (yellow card) 66'; Jonas (yellow card) 89'	Report; VCF Report; SD Report; AS Report; Live TV: Gol T /		Stadium: Mestalla; Attendance: 36,000; Referee: Eduardo Iturralde González (Basque Country)

15 October 2011 8	Mallorca	1–1	Valencia	Palma
18:00 (CEST)	Martí (yellow card) 39'; Flores (yellow card) 42'; Bigas (yellow card) 68'; Pereira 89' (pen.)	Report; VCF Report; SD Report; AS Report; Live TV: Gol T /	Rami 39'; Bruno (yellow card) 57'; Albelda (yellow card) 75'; Feghouli (yellow card) 89'; Topal (yellow card) 89'	Stadium: Iberostar; Attendance: 14,329; Referee: José Paradas Romero (Andalusia)

23 October 2011 9	Valencia	1–1	Athletic Bilbao	Valencia
20:00 (CEST)	Soldado (yellow card) 24', (goal) 88'; Ruiz (yellow card) 31'; Miguel (yellow card) 74'	Report; VCF Report; SD Report; AS Report; Live TV:	Martínez (yellow card) 41'; Iraola (yellow card) 44'; Herrera (yellow card) 71'; Muniain 72'; Iturraspe (yellow card) 78'; Aurtenetxe (yellow card) 89'	Stadium: Mestalla; Attendance: 25,000; Referee: Carlos Clos Gómez (Aragon)

26 October 2011 10	Zaragoza	0–1	Valencia	Zaragoza
20:00 (CEST)	Meira (yellow card) 20'; Mateos (yellow card) 48'; Paredes (yellow card) 60'	Report; VCF Report; SD Report; AS Report; Live TV: Gol T /	Ruiz (yellow card) 31'; Feghouli (yellow card) 40'; Guaita (yellow card) 58'; Mathieu (yellow card) 71'; Alba 81'	Stadium: La Romareda; Attendance: 22,000; Referee: Carlos Velasco Carballo (Community of Madrid)

29 October 2011 11	Valencia	3–1	Getafe	Valencia
18:00 (CEST)	Feghouli 11', 24', (yellow card) 47'; Albelda (yellow card) 49'; Aduriz 76'	Report; VCF Report; SD Report; AS Report; Live TV: Gol T /	Castro 23', (yellow card) 66'; Pérez (yellow card) 44'	Stadium: Mestalla; Attendance: 20,000; Referee: David Fernández Borbalán (Andalusia)

5 November 2011 12	Levante	0–2	Valencia	Valencia
22:00 (CET)	Iborra (yellow card) 35'; Venta (yellow card) 38'; Munúa (yellow card) 39'; Ballesteros (yellow card) 39'; Torres (yellow card) 41'; Nano (yellow card) 48'; Aranda (yellow card) 61'	Report; VCF Report; SD Report; AS Report; Live TV: / TV3 / TM / / A7	Venta 30' (o.g.); Rami (yellow card) 50'; T. Costa 49'; Piatti (yellow card) 89'	Stadium: Ciutat de València; Attendance: 19,114; Referee: Carlos del Cerro Grande (Community of Madrid)

19 November 2011 13	Valencia	2–3	Real Madrid	Valencia
22:00 (CET)	T. Costa (yellow card) 21'; Albelda (yellow card) 60'; Soldado 74', 82'; Alves (yellow card) 90+6'	Report; VCF Report; SD Report; AS Report; Live TV: / TV3 / TM / / A7	Benzema 19'; Arbeloa (yellow card) 33'; Ronaldo (yellow card) 52', (goal) 79'; Marcelo (yellow card) 54'; Özil (yellow card) 55'; Ramos (yellow card) 60', (goal) 71'; Alonso (yellow card) 65'; Granero (yellow card) 90+4'	Stadium: Mestalla; Attendance: 45,000; Referee: José Antonio Teixeira Vitienes (Cantabria)

26 November 2011 14	Rayo Vallecano	1–2	Valencia	Madrid
18:00 (CET)	Fuego (yellow card) 48'; Tamudo 84'; Tito (yellow card) 88'	Report; VCF Report; SD Report; AS Report; Live TV: Gol T /	Jonas 20'; Albelda (yellow card) 41'; T. Costa 56'; Alves (yellow card) 90+1'; Alba (yellow card) 90+1'; Aduriz (yellow card) 90+3'	Stadium: Campo de Vallecas; Attendance: 10,113; Referee: Javier Estrada Fernández (Catalonia)

3 December 2011 15	Valencia	2–1	Espanyol	Valencia
22:00 (CET)	T. Costa 6' (pen.), (yellow card) 42'; Barragán (yellow card) 18'; Rami (yellow card) 32'; Topal (yellow card) 57'; Hernández (yellow card) 64'; Soldado 81'; Alba (yellow card) 83'	Report; VCF Report; SD Report; AS Report; Live TV: / TV3 / TM / / A7	Dídac (yellow card) 6'; Amat (yellow card) 32'; Weiss (yellow card) 44'; Galán (yellow card) 53'; Moreno 69'; Rodríguez (yellow card) 86'	Stadium: Mestalla; Attendance: 40,000; Referee: Carlos Velasco Carballo (Community of Madrid)

10 December 2011 16	Real Betis	2–1	Valencia	Seville
20:00 (CET)	Mario (yellow card) 35'; Pereira (yellow card) 78'; Castro 85', 89', (yellow card) 85'	Report; VCF Report; SD Report; AS Report; Live TV: Gol T /	T. Costa (yellow card) 25'; Soldado (yellow card) 47'; Barragán (yellow card) 58'; Dorado 65' (o.g.)	Stadium: Benito Villamarín; Attendance: 33,000; Referee: Miguel Ángel Pérez Lasa (Basque Country)

18 December 2011 17	Valencia	2–0	Málaga	Valencia
21:30 (CET)	Banega (yellow card) 30'; Soldado 35', 61'; Albelda (yellow card) 38'; Miguel (yellow card) 58'; Hernández (yellow card) 86'	Report; VCF Report; SD Report; AS Report; Live TV:	Mathijsen (yellow card) 42'; Demichelis (yellow card) 71'	Stadium: Mestalla; Attendance: 35,000; Referee: Ignacio Iglesias Villanueva (Galicia)

8 January 2012 18	Villarreal	2–2	Valencia	Villarreal
18:00 (CET)	Ruben 13', (yellow card) 74'; Rodríguez 17'; Bruno (yellow card) 21'; Cani (yellow card) 21'; Zapata (yellow card) 32'; Oriol (yellow card) 35'	Report; VCF Report; SD Report; AS Report; Live TV: Gol T / C+ Liga 2 / Abono Fútbol	Jonas (yellow card) 24'; Soldado (yellow card) 35'; Feghouli 40'; Banega (yellow card) 70'; Miguel (yellow card) 74'; Aduriz 86'	Stadium: El Madrigal; Attendance: 18,000; Referee: David Fernández Borbalán (Andalusia)

14 January 2012 19	Valencia	0–1	Real Sociedad	Valencia
22:00 (CET)	Alba (yellow card) 54'	Report; VCF Report; SD Report; AS Report; Live TV: / TV3 / TM / A7	Griezmann 55'	Stadium: Mestalla; Attendance: 39,000; Referee: Xavier Estrada Fernández (Catalonia)

29 January 2012 21	Racing Santander	2–2	Valencia	Santander
18:00 (CET)	Adrián 1'; Toño (yellow card) 53'; Álvaro (yellow card) 58'; Christian (yellow card) 61'; Jairo (yellow card) 88'; Bernardo 87'; Munitis (red card) 88'; Cisma (yellow card) 89'	Report; VCF Report; SD Report; AS Report; Live TV: Gol T /	Mathieu (yellow card) 43'; Feghouli (yellow card) 48'; Ruiz (yellow card) 63'; Aduriz 66', 79'; R. Costa (yellow card) 88' (red card) 88'	Stadium: El Sardinero; Attendance: 11,494; Referee: Alfonso Álvarez Izquierdo (Catalonia)

5 February 2012 22	Atlético Madrid	0–0	Valencia	Madrid
21:30 (CET)	Miranda (yellow card) 31'; Falcao (yellow card) 59'	Report; VCF Report; SD Report; AS Report; Live TV:	Ruiz (yellow card) 15'; Albelda (yellow card) 45'; Alves (yellow card) 89'	Stadium: Vicente Calderón; Attendance: 45,000; Referee: Alberto Undiano Mallenco (Navarre)

12 February 2012 23	Valencia	4–0	Sporting Gijón	Valencia
18:00 (CET)	Feghouli 33'; Albelda (yellow card) 55'; Botía 73' (o.g.); Jonas 88', 89'	Report; VCF Report; SD Report; AS Report; Live TV: Gol T /	Botía (yellow card) 57'	Stadium: Mestalla; Attendance: 45,000; Referee: Pedro Jesús Pérez Montero (Andalusia)

19 February 2012 24	Barcelona	5–1	Valencia	Barcelona
21:30 (CET)	Messi 21', 27', 75', 84'; Xavi 89'	Report; VCF Report; SD Report; AS Report; Live TV:	Albelda (yellow card) 4'; Piatti 8'; R. Costa (yellow card) 34'; Soldado (yellow card) 65'	Stadium: Camp Nou; Attendance: 74,240; Referee: Javier Turienzo Álvarez (Castile and León)

26 February 2012 25	Valencia	1–2	Sevilla	Valencia
18:00 (CET)	Albelda (yellow card) 5'; T. Costa 25'; Bruno (yellow card) 62'; Aduriz (yellow card) 74'	Report; VCF Report; SD Report; AS Report; Live TV: Gol T /	Medel 36', (yellow card) 89'; Navas 69'; Navarro (yellow card) 81'	Stadium: Mestalla; Attendance: 45,000; Referee: Fernando Teixeira Vitienes (Cantabria)

4 March 2012 26	Granada	0–1	Valencia	Granada
18:00 (CET)	Benítez (yellow card) 33'; Jara (yellow card) 86'; F. Rico (yellow card) 86'; Siqueira (yellow card) 87'	Report; VCF Report; SD Report; AS Report; Live TV: Gol T /	Feghouli (yellow card) 17', (goal) 31'; T. Costa (yellow card) 39'; Rami (yellow card) 50'; Soldado (yellow card) 52'; Alba (yellow card) 65'; Ruiz (yellow card) 67'; Mathieu (yellow card) 73'; Topal (yellow card) 81'; Bruno (yellow card) 85'	Stadium: Los Cármenes; Attendance: 22,500; Referee: Eduardo Iturralde González (Basque Country)

11 March 2012 27	Valencia	2–2	Mallorca	Valencia
16:00 (CET)	T. Costa 23', (red card) 84'; Aduriz 42'; Rami (yellow card) 90+3'	Report; VCF Report; SD Report; AS Report; Live TV: Gol T /	Cáceres (yellow card) 14'; Nsue 57'; Víctor 66', (yellow card) 87'; Castro (yellow card) 89'; Aouate (yellow card) 90+3'	Stadium: Mestalla; Attendance: 35,000; Referee: César Muñiz Fernández (Asturias)

18 March 2012 28	Athletic Bilbao	0–3	Valencia	Bilbao
18:00 (CET)	Iraola (yellow card) 35' (yellow-red card) 66'; Iturraspe (yellow card) 65'; De Marcos (yellow card) 77'; San José (yellow card) 84'	Report; VCF Report; SD Report; AS Report; Live TV: Gol T /	Barragán (yellow card) 28'; Soldado 40', 57', 84' (pen.), (yellow card) 81'; Alba (yellow card) 44'; Topal (yellow card) 49'; Rami (yellow card) 73'; Parejo (yellow card) 79'	Stadium: San Mamés; Attendance: 40,000; Referee: José Antonio Teixeira Vitienes (Cantabria)

21 March 2012 29	Valencia	1–2	Zaragoza	Valencia
20:00 (CET)	Hernández 8'; Dealbert (yellow card) 28'; Soldado (yellow card) 35'; Barragán (yellow card) 88'	Report; VCF Report; SD Report; AS Report; Live TV: Gol T /	Álvarez (yellow card) 21'; Apoño 29', 77'; Lanzaro (yellow card) 31'; Dujmović (yellow card) 42'; Roberto (yellow card) 58'; Zuculini (yellow card) 68' (yellow-red card) 85'	Stadium: Mestalla; Attendance: 39,000; Referee: Carlos del Cerro Grande (Community of Madrid)

24 March 2012 30	Getafe	3–1	Valencia	Getafe
22:00 (CET)	Ríos 14', (yellow card) 82'; Miku 23', (yellow card) 71'; Bruno 29' (o.g.); Míchel (yellow card) 80'	Report; VCF Report; SD Report; AS Report; Live TV: / TV3 / TM / A7	Soldado 5', (yellow card) 44'; Bruno (yellow card) 27'; Alba (yellow card) 46'; Piatti (yellow card) 50'; Parejo (yellow card) 87'; Ruiz (yellow card) 89'	Stadium: Coliseum Alfonso Pérez; Attendance: 8,000; Referee: Xavier Estrada Fernández (Catalonia)

1 April 2012 31	Valencia	1–1	Levante	Valencia
18:00 (CEST)	Feghouli (yellow card) 17'; Hernández (yellow card) 24'; Jonas 34'; Parejo (yellow card) 37'; Aduriz (yellow card) 89'	Report; VCF Report; SD Report; AS Report; Live TV: Gol T /	Cabral (yellow card) 24'; Juanfran (yellow card) 51'; Koné 53'; Barkero (yellow card) 65'	Stadium: Mestalla; Attendance: 45,000; Referee: David Fernández Borbalán (Andalusia)

8 April 2012 32	Real Madrid	0–0	Valencia	Madrid
21:30 (CEST)	Arbeloa (yellow card) 36'; Khedira (yellow card) 47'; Di María (yellow card) 58'	Report; VCF Report; SD Report; AS Report; Live TV:	T. Costa (yellow card) 58'; Parejo (yellow card) 65'; Soldado (yellow card) 89'	Stadium: Santiago Bernabéu; Attendance: 79,000; Referee: Carlos Clos Gómez (Aragon)

11 April 2012 33	Valencia	4–1	Rayo Vallecano	Valencia
20:00 (CEST)	R. Costa (yellow card) 25'; Jonas 41', 76' (pen.); Alba (yellow card) 68', (goal) 69'; Hernández 87'	Report; VCF Report; SD Report; AS Report; Live TV: Gol T /	Bangoura (yellow card) 36'; Pulido (yellow card) 63'; Costa (yellow card) 66'; Movilla (yellow card) 73'; Michu 71', (yellow card) 89'; Arribas (yellow card) 76'; Tamudo (yellow card) 75'	Stadium: Mestalla; Attendance: 40,000; Referee: José Luis Paradas Romero (Andalusia)

15 April 2012 34	Espanyol	4–0	Valencia	Cornellà de Llobregat
12:00 (CEST)	Gómez 26'; Verdú 30'; Dídac (yellow card) 33'; Álvaro 58'; Baena (yellow card) 72'; Sánchez (yellow card) 73'; Uche 80'	Report; VCF Report; SD Report; AS Report; Live TV: Gol T /	Alba (yellow card) 7'; Hernández (yellow card) 22'; T. Costa (yellow card) 71'; Mathieu (yellow card) 72'; Aduriz (yellow card) 88'	Stadium: Cornellà-El Prat; Attendance: 24,205; Referee: Ignacio Iglesias Villanueva (Galicia)

22 April 2012 35	Valencia	4–0	Real Betis	Valencia
21:30 (CEST)	Jonas 6'; Albelda (yellow card) 17'; Feghouli 63'; R. Costa (yellow card) 68'; Soldado 86'; Piatti 88'	Report; VCF Report; SD Report; AS Report; Live TV:	Cañas (yellow card) 11'; Beñat (yellow card) 20'; Dorado (red card) 57'; Molina (red card) 89'	Stadium: Mestalla; Attendance: 35,000; Referee: César Muñiz Fernández (Asturias)

29 April 2012 36	Málaga	1–0	Valencia	Málaga
18:00 (CEST)	Camacho (yellow card) 16', (goal) 27'; Demichelis (yellow card) 44'; Isco (yellow card) 47'	Report; VCF Report; SD Report; AS Report; Live TV: Gol T /	Maduro (yellow card) 19'; Feghouli (yellow card) 42' (yellow-red card) 61'; T. Costa (yellow card) 64'; Alba (yellow card) 89'	Stadium: La Rosaleda; Attendance: 30,000; Referee: Fernando Teixeira Vitienes (Cantabria)

2 May 2012 20	Valencia	4–0	Osasuna	Valencia
22:00 (CEST)	Rami (yellow card) 45'; Aduriz 77', 87'; Jonas 83', 88'	Report; VCF Report; SD Report; AS Report; Live TV: Gol T /	Damià (yellow card) 23'; Bertrán (yellow card) 27'; Lekić (yellow card) 45' (red card) 45+2'; Rovérsio (yellow card) 71'; Lolo (yellow card) 72'	Stadium: Mestalla; Attendance: 35,000; Referee: José González González (Castile and León)
Note: Originally scheduled for 22 January 2012.

5 May 2012 37	Valencia	1–0	Villarreal	Valencia
21:00 (CEST)	Barragán (yellow card) 9'; Rami (yellow card) 41'; R. Costa (yellow card) 43'; Jonas (yellow card) 54', (goal) 90+2'; T. Costa (yellow card) 71'	Report; VCF Report; SD Report; AS Report; Live TV: Multideporte 7 / Gol Stadium	Rodríguez (yellow card) 86'; De Guzmán (yellow card) 90+2'; Valero (yellow card) 90+3'	Stadium: Mestalla; Attendance: 35,000; Referee: Carlos Delgado Ferreiro (Basque Country)

12 May 2012 38	Real Sociedad	1–0	Valencia	San Sebastián
20:00 (CEST)	Estrada (yellow card) 47'; Vela (yellow card) 53'; Griezmann 64'	Report; VCF Report; SD Report; AS Report; Live TV: C+ Liga 2 / Abono Fútbol		Stadium: Anoeta; Attendance: 27,000; Referee: Pedro Jesús Pérez Montero (Andalusia)

=== Copa del Rey ===
==== Round of 32 ====
13 December 2011 First leg	Cádiz	0–0	Valencia	Cádiz
20:00 CET	Héctor (yellow card) 25'; De Coz (yellow card) 46'	Report; VCF Report; SD Report; AS Report; Live TV: Gol T /	Rami (yellow card) 24'; Mathieu (yellow card) 76'	Stadium: Ramón de Carranza; Attendance: 6,635; Referee: Eduardo Iturralde González (Basque Country)

22 December 2011 Second leg	Valencia	4–0 (4–0 agg.)	Cádiz	Valencia
20:00 CET	Ruiz 4', (yellow card) 74'; Jonas 26'; Soldado 40'; Banega 67'; Piatti (yellow card) 83'	Report; VCF Report; SD Report; AS Report; Live TV: Gol T /	Pérez (yellow card) 63'	Stadium: Mestalla; Attendance: 20,000; Referee: Xavier Estrada Fernández (Catalonia)

==== Round of 16 ====
5 January 2012 First leg	Valencia	1–0	Sevilla	Valencia
22:00 CET	Jonas 32'; Ruiz (yellow card) 37'; Soldado (yellow card) 44'; Albelda (yellow card) 58'; Feghouli (yellow card) 84'	Report; VCF Report; SD Report; AS Report; Live TV: Gol T /	Spahić (yellow card) 21'; Trochowski (yellow card) 26'; Medel (yellow card) 34'; Navas (yellow card) 34'; Cáceres (yellow card) 74'; Luis Alberto (yellow card) 85'	Stadium: Mestalla; Attendance: 38,000; Referee: Javier Turienzo Álvarez (Castile and León)

11 January 2012 Second leg	Sevilla	2–1 (2–2a agg.)	Valencia	Seville
22:00 CET	Navarro (yellow card) 18'; Cáceres (yellow card) 59'; Rakitić 69', (yellow card) 81'; Ruiz 89' (o.g.)	Report; VCF Report; SD Report; AS Report; Live TV: Gol T /	Miguel (yellow card) 12'; Albelda (yellow card) 21'; Rami (yellow card) 36'; Mathieu (yellow card) 53'; Soldado 66'; Feghouli (yellow card) 80'; Alba (yellow card) 85'; Alves (yellow card) 89'	Stadium: Ramón Sánchez Pizjuán; Attendance: 25,000; Referee: José Antonio Teixeira Vitienes (Cantabria)

==== Quarter-finals ====
19 January 2012 First leg	Valencia	4–1	Levante	Valencia
21:30 CET	Jonas 24', (yellow card) 80'; Soldado 30', (yellow card) 74'; Piatti 44'; Feghouli (yellow card) 74'; Alves (yellow card) 83'; T. Costa 89', (yellow card) 89'	Report; VCF Report; SD Report; AS Report; Live TV: Cuatro	Torres (yellow card) 32'; Koné 36'; Cabral (yellow card) 53'; Roger (yellow card) 55'; El Zhar (yellow card) 80'; Juanfran (yellow card) 80'; Iborra (yellow card) 89'	Stadium: Mestalla; Attendance: 40,000; Referee: José Luis Paradas Romero (Andalusia)

26 January 2012 Second leg	Levante	0–3 (1–7 agg.)	Valencia	Valencia
21:30 CET	Botelho (yellow card) 21'; Óscar (yellow card) 37' (yellow-red card) 72'; Ballesteros (yellow card) 45'; Del Horno (yellow card) 57'; Iborra (yellow card) 60'; Torres (yellow card) 86'	Report; VCF Report; SD Report; AS Report; Live TV: Gol T /	Aduriz 25'; Piatti 29', 85'; Banega (yellow card) 74'	Stadium: Ciutat de València; Attendance: 12,100; Referee: Ignacio Iglesias Villanueva (Galicia)

==== Semi-finals ====
1 February 2012 First leg	Valencia	1–1	Barcelona	Valencia
21:00 CET	Jonas 27', (yellow card) 27'; Banega (yellow card) 33'; Albelda (yellow card) 46'; Ruiz (yellow card) 52'; Alba (yellow card) 74'; Mathieu (yellow card) 86'	Report; VCF Report; SD Report; AS Report; Live TV:	Puyol 35'; Mascherano (yellow card) 41'; Pinto (yellow card) 79'	Stadium: Mestalla; Attendance: 51,800; Referee: José González González (Castile and León)

8 February 2012 Second leg	Barcelona	2–0 (3–1 agg.)	Valencia	Barcelona
21:00 CET	Fàbregas 15', (yellow card) 68'; Xavi 80'; Thiago (yellow card) 81'; Dani Alves (yellow card) 88'	Report; VCF Report; SD Report; AS Report; Live TV:	Aduriz (yellow card) 21'; Feghouli (yellow card) 44' (yellow-red card) 76'; Ruiz (yellow card) 56'	Stadium: Camp Nou; Attendance: 69,476; Referee: David Fernández Borbalán (Andalusia)

=== UEFA Champions League ===
==== Group stage ====
Pos	Team	Pld	W	D	L	GF	GA	GD	Pts	Qualification	CHE	LEV	VAL	GNK
1	(England) Chelsea	6	3	2	1	13	4	+9	11	Advance to knockout phase	—	2–0	3–0	5–0
2	(Germany) Bayer Leverkusen	6	3	1	2	8	8	0	10	Advance to knockout phase	2–1	—	2–1	2–0
3	(Spain) Valencia	6	2	2	2	12	7	+5	8	Transfer to Europa League	1–1	3–1	—	7–0
4	(Belgium) Genk	6	0	3	3	2	16	−14	3		1–1	1–1	0–0	—

Source: Soccerway

13 September 2011 1	Genk (Belgium)	0–0	(Spain) Valencia	Genk, Belgium
20:45 (CEST)	Buffel (yellow card) 61'; Pudil (yellow card) 67'	Report; VCF Report; SD Report; AS Report; Live TV: Gol T	Banega (yellow card) 28'	Stadium: Cristal Arena; Attendance: 20,248; Referee: Thomas Einwaller (Austria)

28 September 2011 2	Valencia (Spain)	1–1	(England) Chelsea	Valencia, Spain
20:45 (CEST)	Ruiz (yellow card) 13'; Albelda (yellow card) 47'; Soldado 87' (pen.)	Report; VCF Report; SD Report; AS Report; Live TV: C9 / TV3 / / ATV / TM / CS / ETB 1 / TVG / TVC / CMTV / A7 / 7RM / Extremadura / CyL7	Lampard 56'; Kalou (yellow card) 86'; Malouda (yellow card) 90+3'; Mata (yellow card) 90+4'; Cole (yellow card) 90+4'	Stadium: Mestalla; Attendance: 33,791; Referee: Nicola Rizzoli (Italy)

19 October 2011 3	Bayer Leverkusen (Germany)	2–1	(Spain) Valencia	Leverkusen, Germany
20:45 (CEST)	Rolfes (yellow card) 23'; Kießling (yellow card) 26'; Schürrle (yellow card) 48', (goal) 52'; Sam 56'	Report; VCF Report; SD Report; AS Report; Live TV: Gol T	Banega (yellow card) 22'; Jonas 26'; Albelda (yellow card) 42'; Miguel (yellow card) 64'	Stadium: BayArena; Attendance: 26,384; Referee: Craig Thomson (Scotland)

1 November 2011 4	Valencia (Spain)	3–1	(Germany) Bayer Leverkusen	Valencia, Spain
20:45 (CET)	Jonas 1'; T. Costa (yellow card) 61'; Soldado 65'; Mathieu (yellow card) 69'; Rami 75'	Report; VCF Report; SD Report; AS Report; Live TV: Gol T	Ballack (yellow card) 26'; Kießling 31'; Toprak (yellow card) 33'; Sam (yellow card) 82'	Stadium: Mestalla; Attendance: 37,047; Referee: Jonas Eriksson (Sweden)

23 November 2011 5	Valencia (Spain)	7–0	(Belgium) Genk	Valencia, Spain
20:45 (CET)	Jonas 10'; Soldado 13', 35', 39', (yellow card) 64'; Ruiz (yellow card) 16'; Hernández 68'; Aduriz 70'; T. Costa 81'	Report; VCF Report; SD Report; AS Report; Live TV: Gol T		Stadium: Mestalla; Attendance: 35,086; Referee: Tony Chapron (France)

6 December 2011 6	Chelsea (England)	3–0	(Spain) Valencia	London, England
20:45 (CET)	Drogba 3', 76'; Ramires 22'; Romeu (yellow card) 68'	Report; VCF Report; SD Report; AS Report; Live TV:	T. Costa (yellow card) 69'	Stadium: Stamford Bridge; Attendance: 41,109; Referee: Gianluca Rocchi (Italy)

=== UEFA Europa League ===
==== Knockout phase ====
===== Round of 32 =====
16 February 2012 First leg	Stoke City (England)	0–1	(Spain) Valencia	Stoke-on-Trent, England
21:05 (CET)	Shawcross (yellow card) 54'; Etherington (yellow card) 83'; Walters (yellow card) 84'; Whitehead (yellow card) 85'; Wilkinson (yellow card) 90+3'	Report; VCF Report; SD Report; AS Report; Live TV:	Topal 36'; Rami (yellow card) 73'; T. Costa (yellow card) 85'	Stadium: Britannia Stadium; Attendance: 24,185; Referee: Peter Rasmussen (Denmark)

23 February 2012 Second leg	Valencia (Spain)	1–0 (2–0 agg.)	(England) Stoke City	Valencia, Spain
19:00 (CET)	Jonas 24'; Dealbert (yellow card) 77'; Soldado (yellow card) 89'	Report; VCF Report; SD Report; AS Report; Live TV:	Diao (yellow card) 30'; Huth (yellow card) 68'; Pennant (yellow card) 73'; Jones (yellow card) 77'; Shotton (yellow card) 81'	Stadium: Mestalla; Attendance: 45,000; Referee: Markus Strömbergsson (Sweden)

===== Round of 16 =====
8 March 2012 First leg	Valencia (Spain)	4–2	(Netherlands) PSV Eindhoven	Valencia, Spain
21:05 (CET)	Ruiz 11'; Manolev 13' (o.g.); Soldado 43' (pen.), (yellow card) 59'; Rami (yellow card) 45'; Piatti 56'; Barragán (yellow card) 58'	Report; VCF Report; SD Report; AS Report; Live TV:	Mertens (yellow card) 49'; Pieters (yellow card) 55'; Toivonen 83' (pen.); Wijnaldum 90'	Stadium: Mestalla; Attendance: 30,000; Referee: Manuel Gräfe (Germany)

15 March 2012 Second leg	PSV Eindhoven (Netherlands)	1–1 (3–5 agg.)	(Spain) Valencia	Eindhoven, Netherlands
19:00 (CET)	Manolev (yellow card) 5'; Toivonen 64', (yellow card) 88'; Bouma (yellow card) 71'; Lens (yellow card) 90+3'	Report; VCF Report; SD Report; AS Report; Live TV:	Rami 47', (red card) 88'; Bruno (yellow card) 57'; Alba (yellow card) 74'; Aduriz (yellow card) 78'; Mathieu (yellow card) 84'; Alves (yellow card) 88'	Stadium: Philips Stadion; Attendance: 22,000; Referee: William Collum (Scotland)

===== Quarter-finals =====
29 March 2012 First leg	AZ (Netherlands)	2–1	(Spain) Valencia	Alkmaar, Netherlands
21:05 (CEST)	Holman 45+1'; Martens 79'; Maher (yellow card) 87'	Report; VCF Report; SD Report; AS Report; Live TV:	Topal 51'; Barragán (yellow card) 63'; Dealbert (yellow card) 88'	Stadium: AFAS Stadion; Attendance: 16,100; Referee: Martin Atkinson (England)

5 April 2012 Second leg	Valencia (Spain)	4–0 (5–2 agg.)	(Netherlands) AZ	Valencia, Spain
21:05 (CEST)	T. Costa (yellow card) 4'; Rami 15', 17'; Alba 56'; Barragán (yellow card) 74'; Hernández 80'	Report; VCF Report; SD Report; AS Report; Live TV:		Stadium: Mestalla; Attendance: 35,000; Referee: Pavel Královec (Czech Republic)

===== Semi-finals =====
19 April 2012 First leg	Atlético Madrid (Spain)	4–2	(Spain) Valencia	Madrid, Spain
21:05 (CEST)	Falcao 18', 79'; Turan (yellow card) 41'; Miranda 49'; Adrián 54'; Domínguez (yellow card) 90+5'	Report; VCF Report; SD Report; AS Report; Live TV: Telecinco	Feghouli (yellow card) 15'; Jonas 45+2'; Alves (yellow card) 68'; R. Costa 90+4'	Stadium: Vicente Calderón; Attendance: 49,400; Referee: Craig Thomson (Scotland)

26 April 2012 Second leg	Valencia (Spain)	0–1 (2–5 agg.)	(Spain) Atlético Madrid	Valencia, Spain
21:05 (CEST)	Soldado (yellow card) 79'; Alba (yellow card) 79'; Aduriz (yellow card) 86'	Report; VCF Report; SD Report; AS Report; Live TV: Telecinco	Courtois (yellow card) 36'; Adrián 60'; Tiago (red card) 79'	Stadium: Mestalla; Attendance: 45,000; Referee: Damir Skomina (Slovenia)

== 2011–12 Valencia Féminas season ==
=== Current squad ===
Note: Flags indicate national team as defined under FIFA eligibility rules; some limited exceptions apply. Players may hold more than one non-FIFA nationality.

No.	Pos.	Nation	Player
1	GK	ESP	Mª J. Casamayor
2	DF	ESP	Estela Ríos
3	DF	ESP	Nuria Masià
4	FW	ESP	Montserrat Soler
5	DF	ESP	Ivana Andrés
6	MF	ESP	Gema Gili
7	MF	ESP	María Martí
8	MF	ESP	Paula Arnal
9	FW	ESP	Jessica Massip
10	MF	ESP	Marina Gassent
11	FW	ESP	Arantxa Lozano
12	MF	ESP	Salomé Navalón
13	GK	ESP	Gema Rueda

No.	Pos.	Nation	Player
14	MF	ESP	Carme Ferrer
15	DF	ESP	Sara Vicente
16	DF	ESP	Sharon Márquez
17	FW	ESP	Ana Amo
18	FW	ESP	Marta Mateos
19	MF	ESP	Raquel Martínez
21	FW	ESP	María José Llavata
22	DF	ESP	Marta Peña
23	MF	ESP	Ana Torrentí
24	MF	ESP	Naiara Ves
25	DF	ESP	Nuria Sánchez
—	DF	ESP	Conchi Ricarte
—	MF	ESP	Claudia Barea
—	FW	ESP	Raquel Pinel

=== Competitions ===
==== Primera División ====
===== Results summary =====
Overall								Home						Away					
Pld	W	D	L	GF	GA	GD	Pts	W	D	L	GF	GA	GD	W	D	L	GF	GA	GD
4	0	0	4	3	12	−9	0	0	0	2	1	7	−6	0	0	2	2	5	−3

===== League table =====
Pos	Team	Pld	W	D	L	GF	GA	GD	Pts	Qualification or relegation
11	Llanos de Olivenza	34	10	5	19	39	65	−26	35	
12	Collerense	34	9	6	19	54	91	−37	33	
13	Valencia	34	10	1	23	37	83	−46	31	
14	Lagunak	34	9	4	21	32	70	−38	31	
15	L'Estartit (R)	34	8	5	21	35	74	−39	29	Relegation to Segunda División

Source: women.soccerway.com
Rules for classification: 1) points; 2) head-to-head points; 3) head-to-head goal difference; 4) head-to-head goals scored; 5) goal difference; 6) number of goals scored; 7) Fair-play points
(R) Relegated

===== Matches =====
4 September 2011 1	Valencia	1–3	Real Sociedad	Valencia
	Amo 50'		Zelaia 30', 58'; Gastearena 63'

11 September 2011 2	Athletic Bilbao	2–1	Valencia	Bilbao
	Olabarrieta 74'; Paredes 88'		Sánchez 90+3'

25 September 2011 3	Valencia	0–4	RCD Espanyol	Valencia
			Vilas 14', 45'; Sanderson 21'; Peña 60' (o.g.)

2 October 2011 4	Reocín-Racing	3–1	Valencia	Reocín
	García 44', 86'; Díez 60'		Martí 14'
