= 2011–12 UEFA Europa League knockout phase =

International football competition

The knockout phase of the 2011–12 UEFA Europa League began on 14 February 2012 with the round of 32, and concluded on 9 May 2012 with the final at National Arena in Bucharest, Romania.

Times up to 24 March 2012 (round of 32 and round of 16) are CET (UTC+01:00), thereafter (quarter-finals and beyond) times are CEST (UTC+02:00).

== Round and draw dates ==
All draws held at UEFA headquarters in Nyon, Switzerland.

Round	Draw date and time	First leg	Second leg
Round of 32	16 December 2011	16 February 2012	23 February 2012
Round of 16	16 December 2011	8 March 2012	15 March 2012
Quarter-finals	16 March 2012	29 March 2012	5 April 2012
Semi-finals	16 March 2012	19 April 2012	26 April 2012
Final	16 March 2012	9 May 2012 at Arena Națională, Bucharest	

Matches may also be played on Tuesdays or Wednesdays instead of the regular Thursdays due to scheduling conflicts.

== Format ==
The knockout phase involves 32 teams: the 24 teams that finished in the top two in each group in the group stage and the eight teams that finished in third place in the UEFA Champions League group stage.

Each tie in the knockout phase, apart from the final, is played over two legs, with each team playing one leg at home. The team that has the higher aggregate score over the two legs progresses to the next round. In the event that aggregate scores finish level, the away goals rule is applied, i.e. the team that scored more goals away from home over the two legs progresses. If away goals are also equal, then 30 minutes of extra time are played, divided into two 15-minute halves. The away goals rule is again applied after extra time, i.e. if there are goals scored during extra time and the aggregate score is still level, the visiting team qualifies by virtue of more away goals scored. If no goals are scored during extra time, the tie is decided by penalty shootout. In the final, the tie is played as a single match. If scores are level at the end of normal time in the final, extra time is played, followed by penalties if scores remain tied.

In the draw for the round of 32, the twelve group winners and the four best third-placed teams from the Champions League group stage (based on their match record in the group stage) are seeded, and the twelve group runners-up and the other four third-placed teams from the Champions League group stage are unseeded. A seeded team is drawn against an unseeded team, with the seeded team hosting the second leg. Teams from the same group or the same association cannot be drawn against each other. In the draws for the round of 16 onwards, there are no seedings, and teams from the same group or the same association may be drawn against each other.

== Qualified teams ==
Key to colours
Seeded in round of 32 draw
Unseeded in round of 32 draw

=== Europa League group stage winners and runners-up ===
Group	Winners	Runners-up
A	(Greece) PAOK	(Russia) Rubin Kazan
B	(Belgium) Standard Liège	(Germany) Hannover 96
C	(Netherlands) PSV Eindhoven	(Poland) Legia Warsaw
D	(Portugal) Sporting CP	(Italy) Lazio
E	(Turkey) Beşiktaş	(England) Stoke City
F	(Spain) Athletic Bilbao	(Austria) Red Bull Salzburg
G	(Ukraine) Metalist Kharkiv	(Netherlands) AZ
H	(Belgium) Club Brugge	(Portugal) Braga
I	(Spain) Atlético Madrid	(Italy) Udinese
J	(Germany) Schalke 04	(Romania) Steaua București
K	(Netherlands) Twente	(Poland) Wisła Kraków
L	(Belgium) Anderlecht	(Russia) Lokomotiv Moscow

=== Champions League group stage third-placed teams ===
Seed	Grp	Team	Pld	W	D	L	GF	GA	GD	Pts	Seeding
1	A	(England) Manchester City	6	3	1	2	9	6	+3	10	Seeded in round of 32 draw
2	C	(England) Manchester United	6	2	3	1	11	8	+3	9	Seeded in round of 32 draw
3	F	(Greece) Olympiacos	6	3	0	3	8	6	+2	9	Seeded in round of 32 draw
4	E	(Spain) Valencia	6	2	2	2	12	7	+5	8	Seeded in round of 32 draw
5	G	(Portugal) Porto	6	2	2	2	7	7	0	8	Unseeded in round of 32 draw
6	D	(Netherlands) Ajax	6	2	2	2	6	6	0	8	Unseeded in round of 32 draw
7	B	(Turkey) Trabzonspor	6	1	4	1	3	5	−2	7	Unseeded in round of 32 draw
8	H	(Czech Republic) Viktoria Plzeň	6	1	2	3	4	11	−7	5	Unseeded in round of 32 draw

Source: UEFA
Rules for classification: 1) Points; 2) Goal difference; 3) Goals scored; 4) Club coefficient.

== Bracket ==
Round of 32
(Italy) Lazio	1	0	1
(Spain) Atlético Madrid	3	1	4
(Portugal) Braga	0	1	1
(Turkey) Beşiktaş	2	0	2
(Poland) Wisła Kraków	1	0	1
(Belgium) Standard Liège (a)	1	0	1
(Germany) Hannover 96	2	1	3
(Belgium) Club Brugge	1	0	1
(Netherlands) AZ	1	1	2
(Belgium) Anderlecht	0	0	0
(Italy) Udinese	0	3	3
(Greece) PAOK	0	0	0
(England) Stoke City	0	0	0
(Spain) Valencia	1	1	2
(Turkey) Trabzonspor	1	1	2
(Netherlands) PSV Eindhoven	2	4	6
(Poland) Legia Warsaw	2	0	2
(Portugal) Sporting CP	2	1	3
(Portugal) Porto	1	0	1
(England) Manchester City	2	4	6
(Austria) Red Bull Salzburg	0	1	1
(Ukraine) Metalist Kharkiv	4	4	8
(Russia) Rubin Kazan	0	0	0
(Greece) Olympiacos	1	1	2
(Romania) Steaua București	0	0	0
(Netherlands) Twente	1	1	2
(Czech Republic) Viktoria Plzeň	1	1	2
(Germany) Schalke 04 (a.e.t.)	1	3	4
(Netherlands) Ajax	0	2	2
(England) Manchester United	2	1	3
(Russia) Lokomotiv Moscow	2	0	2
(Spain) Athletic Bilbao (a)	1	1	2

Round of 16
(Spain) Atlético Madrid	3	3	6
(Turkey) Beşiktaş	1	0	1
(Belgium) Standard Liège	2	0	2
(Germany) Hannover 96	2	4	6
(Netherlands) AZ	2	1	3
(Italy) Udinese	0	2	2
(Spain) Valencia	4	1	5
(Netherlands) PSV Eindhoven	2	1	3
(Portugal) Sporting CP (a)	1	2	3
(England) Manchester City	0	3	3
(Ukraine) Metalist Kharkiv (a)	0	2	2
(Greece) Olympiacos	1	1	2
(Netherlands) Twente	1	1	2
(Germany) Schalke 04	0	4	4
(England) Manchester United	2	1	3
(Spain) Athletic Bilbao	3	2	5

Quarter-finals
(Spain) Atlético Madrid	2	2	4
(Germany) Hannover 96	1	1	2
(Netherlands) AZ	2	0	2
(Spain) Valencia	1	4	5
(Portugal) Sporting CP	2	1	3
(Ukraine) Metalist Kharkiv	1	1	2
(Germany) Schalke 04	2	2	4
(Spain) Athletic Bilbao	4	2	6

Semi-finals
(Spain) Atlético Madrid	4	1	5
(Spain) Valencia	2	0	2
(Portugal) Sporting CP	2	1	3
(Spain) Athletic Bilbao	1	3	4

Final
9 May – Bucharest
(Spain) Atlético Madrid	3
(Spain) Athletic Bilbao	0

== Round of 32 ==
The draw for the round of 32 was held on 16 December 2011.

=== Summary ===
The first legs were played on 14 and 16 February, and the second legs were played on 22 and 23 February 2012.

Team 1	Agg.	Team 2	1st leg	2nd leg
Porto (Portugal)	1–6	(England) Manchester City	1–2	0–4
Ajax (Netherlands)	2–3	(England) Manchester United	0–2	2–1
Lokomotiv Moscow (Russia)	2–2 (a)	(Spain) Athletic Bilbao	2–1	0–1
Red Bull Salzburg (Austria)	1–8	(Ukraine) Metalist Kharkiv	0–4	1–4
Stoke City (England)	0–2	(Spain) Valencia	0–1	0–1
Rubin Kazan (Russia)	0–2	(Greece) Olympiacos	0–1	0–1
AZ (Netherlands)	2–0	(Belgium) Anderlecht	1–0	1–0
Lazio (Italy)	1–4	(Spain) Atlético Madrid	1–3	0–1
Steaua București (Romania)	0–2	(Netherlands) Twente	0–1	0–1
Viktoria Plzeň (Czech Republic)	2–4	(Germany) Schalke 04	1–1	1–3 (a.e.t.)
Wisła Kraków (Poland)	1–1 (a)	(Belgium) Standard Liège	1–1	0–0
Braga (Portugal)	1–2	(Turkey) Beşiktaş	0–2	1–0
Udinese (Italy)	3–0	(Greece) PAOK	0–0	3–0
Trabzonspor (Turkey)	2–6	(Netherlands) PSV Eindhoven	1–2	1–4
Hannover 96 (Germany)	3–1	(Belgium) Club Brugge	2–1	1–0
Legia Warsaw (Poland)	2–3	(Portugal) Sporting CP	2–2	0–1

=== Matches ===
16 February 2012
21:05

Porto (Portugal)	1–2	(England) Manchester City
Varela 27'	Report	Pereira 55' (o.g.); Agüero 84'

Estádio do Dragão, Porto
Attendance: 47,417
Referee: Cüneyt Çakır (Turkey)
22 February 2012
18:00

Manchester City (England)	4–0	(Portugal) Porto
Agüero 1'; Džeko 76'; Silva 84'; Pizarro 86'	Report

City of Manchester Stadium, Manchester
Attendance: 39,548
Referee: Wolfgang Stark (Germany)

Manchester City won 6–1 on aggregate.

16 February 2012
19:00

Ajax (Netherlands)	0–2	(England) Manchester United
	Report	Young 59'; Hernández 85'

Amsterdam Arena, Amsterdam
Attendance: 48,966
Referee: Gianluca Rocchi (Italy)
23 February 2012
21:05

Manchester United (England)	1–2	(Netherlands) Ajax
Hernández 6'	Report	Özbiliz 37'; Alderweireld 87'

Old Trafford, Manchester
Attendance: 67,328
Referee: Damir Skomina (Slovenia)

Manchester United won 3–2 on aggregate.

16 February 2012
18:00

Lokomotiv Moscow (Russia)	2–1	(Spain) Athletic Bilbao
Glushakov 61' (pen.); Caicedo 71'	Report	Muniain 35'

Luzhniki Stadium, Moscow (Note: Lokomotiv Moscow played their home match at Luzhniki Stadium, Moscow as the grass pitch at their own Lokomotiv Stadium might not be in good enough condition because of the cold.)
Attendance: 13,160
Referee: Ovidiu Haţegan (Romania)
23 February 2012
19:00

Athletic Bilbao (Spain)	1–0	(Russia) Lokomotiv Moscow
Muniain 62'	Report

San Mamés Stadium, Bilbao
Attendance: 29,532
Referee: Pawel Gil (Poland)

2–2 on aggregate; Athletic Bilbao won on away goals.

16 February 2012
19:00

Red Bull Salzburg (Austria)	0–4	(Ukraine) Metalist Kharkiv
	Report	Taison 1'; Cristaldo 38', 41'; Devych 90+2'

Red Bull Arena, Wals-Siezenheim
Attendance: 8,100
Referee: Marijo Strahonja (Croatia)
23 February 2012
21:05

Metalist Kharkiv (Ukraine)	4–1	(Austria) Red Bull Salzburg
Hinteregger 28' (o.g.); Cristaldo 62'; Blanco 63'; Marlos 87'	Report	Jantscher 56'

Metalist Stadium, Kharkiv
Attendance: 30,826
Referee: Antony Gautier (France)

Metalist Kharkiv won 8–1 on aggregate.

16 February 2012
21:05

Stoke City (England)	0–1	(Spain) Valencia
	Report	Topal 36'

Britannia Stadium, Stoke-on-Trent
Attendance: 24,185
Referee: Peter Rasmussen (Denmark)
23 February 2012
19:00

Valencia (Spain)	1–0	(England) Stoke City
Jonas 24'	Report

Mestalla Stadium, Valencia
Attendance: 36,535
Referee: Markus Strömbergsson (Sweden)

Valencia won 2–0 on aggregate.

14 February 2012
12:00

Rubin Kazan (Russia)	0–1	(Greece) Olympiacos
	Report	Fuster 72'

Luzhniki Stadium, Moscow (Note: Rubin Kazan played their home match at Luzhniki Stadium, Moscow as the grass pitch at their own Central Stadium might not be in good enough condition because of the cold.)
Attendance: 1,741
Referee: Milorad Mažić (Serbia)
23 February 2012
21:05

Olympiacos (Greece)	1–0	(Russia) Rubin Kazan
Djebbour 14'	Report

Karaiskakis Stadium, Piraeus
Attendance: 28,874
Referee: Stefan Johannesson (Sweden)

Olympiacos won 2–0 on aggregate.

16 February 2012
19:00

AZ (Netherlands)	1–0	(Belgium) Anderlecht
Maher 35'	Report

AFAS Stadion, Alkmaar
Attendance: 13,744
Referee: Florian Meyer (Germany)
23 February 2012
21:05

Anderlecht (Belgium)	0–1	(Netherlands) AZ
	Report	Martens 54'

Constant Vanden Stock Stadium, Brussels
Attendance: 20,409
Referee: Pedro Proença (Portugal)

AZ won 2–0 on aggregate.

16 February 2012
19:00

Lazio (Italy)	1–3	(Spain) Atlético Madrid
Klose 19'	Report	Adrián 25'; Falcao 37', 63'

Stadio Olimpico, Rome
Attendance: 30,604
Referee: Pavel Královec (Czech Republic)
23 February 2012
21:05

Atlético Madrid (Spain)	1–0	(Italy) Lazio
Godín 48'	Report

Vicente Calderón Stadium, Madrid
Attendance: 26,700
Referee: Martin Atkinson (England)

Atlético Madrid won 4–1 on aggregate.

16 February 2012
21:05

Steaua București (Romania)	0–1	(Netherlands) Twente
	Report	John 53'

Arena Națională, Bucharest
Attendance: 49,588
Referee: Mark Clattenburg (England)
23 February 2012
19:00

Twente (Netherlands)	1–0	(Romania) Steaua București
Chadli 29'	Report

De Grolsch Veste, Enschede
Attendance: 27,000
Referee: Robert Schörgenhofer (Austria)

Twente won 2–0 on aggregate.

16 February 2012
19:00

Viktoria Plzeň (Czech Republic)	1–1	(Germany) Schalke 04
Darida 22'	Report	Huntelaar 75'

Stadion města Plzně, Plzeň
Attendance: 11,435
Referee: Stéphane Lannoy (France)
23 February 2012
21:05

Schalke 04 (Germany)	3–1 (a.e.t.)	(Czech Republic) Viktoria Plzeň
Huntelaar 8', 106', 120+1'	Report	Rajtoral 88'

Arena AufSchalke, Gelsenkirchen
Attendance: 54,142
Referee: Alan Kelly (Republic of Ireland)

Schalke 04 won 4–2 on aggregate.

16 February 2012
21:05

Wisła Kraków (Poland)	1–1	(Belgium) Standard Liège
Genkov 88'	Report	Cyriac 27' (pen.)

Stadion Miejski im. Henryka Reymana, Kraków
Attendance: 19,000
Referee: David Fernández Borbalán (Spain)
23 February 2012
19:00

Standard Liège (Belgium)	0–0	(Poland) Wisła Kraków
	Report

Stade Maurice Dufrasne, Liège
Attendance: 20,289
Referee: Milorad Mažić (Serbia)

1–1 on aggregate; Standard Liège won on away goals.

14 February 2012
18:30

Braga (Portugal)	0–2	(Turkey) Beşiktaş
	Report	Sivok 37'; Simão 58'

Estádio Municipal de Braga, Braga
Attendance: 9,088
Referee: Kevin Blom (Netherlands)
23 February 2012
21:05

Beşiktaş (Turkey)	0–1	(Portugal) Braga
	Report	Lima 25'

BJK İnönü Stadium, Istanbul
Attendance: 27,075
Referee: István Vad (Hungary)

Beşiktaş won 2–1 on aggregate.

16 February 2012
21:05

Udinese (Italy)	0–0	(Greece) PAOK
	Report

Stadio Friuli, Udine
Attendance: 11,641
Referee: Alberto Undiano Mallenco (Spain)
23 February 2012
19:00

PAOK (Greece)	0–3	(Italy) Udinese
	Report	Danilo 6'; Floro Flores 15'; Domizzi 51' (pen.)

Toumba Stadium, Thessaloniki
Attendance: 22,400
Referee: Tom Harald Hagen (Norway)

Udinese won 3–0 on aggregate.

16 February 2012
21:05

Trabzonspor (Turkey)	1–2	(Netherlands) PSV Eindhoven
Adın 33'	Report	Matavž 6'; Toivonen 12'

Hüseyin Avni Aker Stadium, Trabzon
Attendance: 18,866
Referee: Felix Brych (Germany)
23 February 2012
19:00

PSV Eindhoven (Netherlands)	4–1	(Turkey) Trabzonspor
Mertens 15' (pen.); Matavž 31', 53'; Strootman 38'	Report	Yılmaz 43'

Philips Stadion, Eindhoven
Attendance: 18,300
Referee: Tony Chapron (France)

PSV Eindhoven won 6–2 on aggregate.

16 February 2012
21:05

Hannover 96 (Germany)	2–1	(Belgium) Club Brugge
Sobiech 73'; Schlaudraff 81' (pen.)	Report	Lestienne 51'

Niedersachsenstadion, Hanover
Attendance: 42,000
Referee: Jorge Sousa (Portugal)
23 February 2012
19:00

Club Brugge (Belgium)	0–1	(Germany) Hannover 96
	Report	Diouf 21'

Jan Breydel Stadium, Bruges
Attendance: 21,690
Referee: William Collum (Scotland)

Hannover 96 won 3–1 on aggregate.

16 February 2012
19:00

Legia Warsaw (Poland)	2–2	(Portugal) Sporting CP
Wawrzyniak 37'; Gol 79'	Report	Carriço 60'; Santos 88'

Stadion Wojska Polskiego, Warsaw
Attendance: 27,234
Referee: Matej Jug (Slovenia)
23 February 2012
21:05

Sporting CP (Portugal)	1–0	(Poland) Legia Warsaw
Fernández 84'	Report

Estádio José Alvalade, Lisbon
Attendance: 20,144
Referee: Vladislav Bezborodov (Russia)

Sporting CP won 3–2 on aggregate.

== Round of 16 ==
The draw for the round of 16 was held on 16 December 2011, immediately after the round of 32 draw.

=== Summary ===
The first legs were played on 8 March, and the second legs were played on 15 March 2012.

Team 1	Agg.	Team 2	1st leg	2nd leg
Metalist Kharkiv (Ukraine)	2–2 (a)	(Greece) Olympiacos	0–1	2–1
Sporting CP (Portugal)	3–3 (a)	(England) Manchester City	1–0	2–3
Twente (Netherlands)	2–4	(Germany) Schalke 04	1–0	1–4
Standard Liège (Belgium)	2–6	(Germany) Hannover 96	2–2	0–4
Valencia (Spain)	5–3	(Netherlands) PSV Eindhoven	4–2	1–1
AZ (Netherlands)	3–2	(Italy) Udinese	2–0	1–2
Atlético Madrid (Spain)	6–1	(Turkey) Beşiktaş	3–1	3–0
Manchester United (England)	3–5	(Spain) Athletic Bilbao	2–3	1–2

=== Matches ===
8 March 2012
19:00

Metalist Kharkiv (Ukraine)	0–1	(Greece) Olympiacos
	Report	Fuster 50'

Metalist Stadium, Kharkiv
Attendance: 35,136
Referee: István Vad (Hungary)
15 March 2012
21:05

Olympiacos (Greece)	1–2	(Ukraine) Metalist Kharkiv
Marcano 15'	Report	Villagra 81'; Devych 86'

Karaiskakis Stadium, Piraeus
Attendance: 30,077
Referee: Ovidiu Haţegan (Romania)

2–2 on aggregate; Metalist Kharkiv won on away goals.

8 March 2012
19:00

Sporting CP (Portugal)	1–0	(England) Manchester City
Xandão 51'	Report

Estádio José Alvalade, Lisbon
Attendance: 34,371
Referee: Carlos Velasco Carballo (Spain)
15 March 2012
21:05

Manchester City (England)	3–2	(Portugal) Sporting CP
Agüero 60', 83'; Balotelli 75' (pen.)	Report	Fernández 33'; Van Wolfswinkel 40'

City of Manchester Stadium, Manchester
Attendance: 38,021
Referee: Tom Harald Hagen (Norway)

3–3 on aggregate; Sporting CP won on away goals.

8 March 2012
19:00

Twente (Netherlands)	1–0	(Germany) Schalke 04
De Jong 61' (pen.)	Report

De Grolsch Veste, Enschede
Attendance: 30,000
Referee: Craig Thomson (Scotland)
15 March 2012
21:05

Schalke 04 (Germany)	4–1	(Netherlands) Twente
Huntelaar 29', 57' (pen.), 81'; Jones 71'	Report	Janssen 14'

Arena AufSchalke, Gelsenkirchen
Attendance: 54,142
Referee: Viktor Kassai (Hungary)

Schalke 04 won 4–2 on aggregate.

8 March 2012
21:05

Standard Liège (Belgium)	2–2	(Germany) Hannover 96
Buyens 27'; Tchité 30'	Report	Stindl 22' (pen.); Diouf 56'

Stade Maurice Dufrasne, Liège
Attendance: 17,498
Referee: Tony Chapron (France)
15 March 2012
19:00

Hannover 96 (Germany)	4–0	(Belgium) Standard Liège
Abdellaoue 4'; Kanu 21', 73' (o.g.); Pinto 90+3'	Report

Niedersachsenstadion, Hanover
Attendance: 43,000
Referee: Pavel Královec (Czech Republic)

Hannover 96 won 6–2 on aggregate.

8 March 2012
21:05

Valencia (Spain)	4–2	(Netherlands) PSV Eindhoven
Ruiz 11'; Soldado 13', 43' (pen.); Piatti 56'	Report	Toivonen 83' (pen.); Wijnaldum 90'

Mestalla Stadium, Valencia
Attendance: 25,495
Referee: Manuel Gräfe (Germany)
15 March 2012
19:00

PSV Eindhoven (Netherlands)	1–1	(Spain) Valencia
Toivonen 64'	Report	Rami 47'

Philips Stadion, Eindhoven
Attendance: 29,500
Referee: William Collum (Scotland)

Valencia won 5–3 on aggregate.

8 March 2012
21:05

AZ (Netherlands)	2–0	(Italy) Udinese
Martens 63'; Falkenburg 84'	Report

AFAS Stadion, Alkmaar
Attendance: 12,579
Referee: David Fernández Borbalán (Spain)
15 March 2012
19:00

Udinese (Italy)	2–1	(Netherlands) AZ
Di Natale 3' (pen.), 15'	Report	Falkenburg 31'

Stadio Friuli, Udine
Attendance: 13,300
Referee: Milorad Mažić (Serbia)

AZ won 3–2 on aggregate.

8 March 2012
19:00

Atlético Madrid (Spain)	3–1	(Turkey) Beşiktaş
Salvio 24', 27'; Adrián 37'	Report	Simão 53'

Vicente Calderón Stadium, Madrid
Attendance: 27,431
Referee: Jonas Eriksson (Sweden)
15 March 2012
21:05

Beşiktaş (Turkey)	0–3	(Spain) Atlético Madrid
	Report	Adrián 26'; Falcao 83'; Salvio 90+4'

BJK İnönü Stadium, Istanbul
Attendance: 24,824
Referee: Paolo Tagliavento (Italy)

Atlético Madrid won 6–1 on aggregate.

8 March 2012
21:05

Manchester United (England)	2–3	(Spain) Athletic Bilbao
Rooney 22', 90+2' (pen.)	Report	Llorente 44'; De Marcos 72'; Muniain 90'

Old Trafford, Manchester
Attendance: 59,265
Referee: Florian Meyer (Germany)
15 March 2012
19:00

Athletic Bilbao (Spain)	2–1	(England) Manchester United
Llorente 23'; De Marcos 66'	Report	Rooney 80'

San Mamés Stadium, Bilbao
Attendance: 36,958
Referee: Cüneyt Çakır (Turkey)

Athletic Bilbao won 5–3 on aggregate.

== Quarter-finals ==
The draws for the quarter-finals were held on 16 March 2012.

=== Summary ===
The first legs were played on 29 March, and the second legs on 5 April 2012.

Team 1	Agg.	Team 2	1st leg	2nd leg
AZ (Netherlands)	2–5	(Spain) Valencia	2–1	0–4
Schalke 04 (Germany)	4–6	(Spain) Athletic Bilbao	2–4	2–2
Sporting CP (Portugal)	3–2	(Ukraine) Metalist Kharkiv	2–1	1–1
Atlético Madrid (Spain)	4–2	(Germany) Hannover 96	2–1	2–1

=== Matches ===
29 March 2012
21:05

AZ (Netherlands)	2–1	(Spain) Valencia
Holman 45+1'; Martens 79'	Report	Topal 52'

AFAS Stadion, Alkmaar
Attendance: 16,100
Referee: Martin Atkinson (England)
5 April 2012
21:05

Valencia (Spain)	4–0	(Netherlands) AZ
Rami 15', 17'; Alba 56'; Hernández 80'	Report

Mestalla Stadium, Valencia
Attendance: 27,738
Referee: Pavel Královec (Czech Republic)

Valencia won 5–2 on aggregate.

29 March 2012
21:05

Schalke 04 (Germany)	2–4	(Spain) Athletic Bilbao
Raúl 22', 60'	Report	Llorente 20', 73'; De Marcos 81'; Muniain 90+3'

Arena AufSchalke, Gelsenkirchen
Attendance: 53,883
Referee: Pedro Proença (Portugal)
5 April 2012
21:05

Athletic Bilbao (Spain)	2–2	(Germany) Schalke 04
Ibai 41'; Susaeta 55'	Report	Huntelaar 29'; Raúl 52'

San Mamés Stadium, Bilbao
Attendance: 37,048
Referee: Nicola Rizzoli (Italy)

Athletic Bilbao won 6–4 on aggregate.

29 March 2012
21:05

Sporting CP (Portugal)	2–1	(Ukraine) Metalist Kharkiv
Izmailov 51'; Insúa 64'	Report	Xavier 90+1' (pen.)

Estádio José Alvalade, Lisbon
Attendance: 40,512
Referee: Wolfgang Stark (Germany)
5 April 2012
21:05

Metalist Kharkiv (Ukraine)	1–1	(Portugal) Sporting CP
Cristaldo 57'	Report	Van Wolfswinkel 44'

Metalist Stadium, Kharkiv
Attendance: 38,633
Referee: William Collum (Scotland)

Sporting CP won 3–2 on aggregate.

29 March 2012
21:05

Atlético Madrid (Spain)	2–1	(Germany) Hannover 96
Falcao 9'; Salvio 89'	Report	Diouf 38'

Vicente Calderón Stadium, Madrid
Attendance: 29,223
Referee: Stéphane Lannoy (France)
5 April 2012
21:05

Hannover 96 (Germany)	1–2	(Spain) Atlético Madrid
Diouf 81'	Report	Adrián 63'; Falcao 87'

Niedersachsenstadion, Hanover
Attendance: 44,000
Referee: Mark Clattenburg (England)

Atlético Madrid won 4–2 on aggregate.

== Semi-finals ==
The draws for the semi-finals were held on 16 March 2012, immediately after the quarter-final draw.

=== Summary ===
The first legs were played on 19 April, and the second legs were played on 26 April 2012.

Team 1	Agg.	Team 2	1st leg	2nd leg
Atlético Madrid (Spain)	5–2	(Spain) Valencia	4–2	1–0
Sporting CP (Portugal)	3–4	(Spain) Athletic Bilbao	2–1	1–3

=== Matches ===
19 April 2012
21:05

Atlético Madrid (Spain)	4–2	(Spain) Valencia
Falcao 18', 78'; Miranda 49'; Adrián 54'	Report	Jonas 45+3'; R. Costa 90+4'

Vicente Calderón Stadium, Madrid
Attendance: 40,899
Referee: Craig Thomson (Scotland)
26 April 2012
21:05

Valencia (Spain)	0–1	(Spain) Atlético Madrid
	Report	Adrián 60'

Mestalla Stadium, Valencia
Attendance: 43,711
Referee: Damir Skomina (Slovenia)

Atlético Madrid won 5–2 on aggregate.

19 April 2012
21:05

Sporting CP (Portugal)	2–1	(Spain) Athletic Bilbao
Insúa 76'; Capel 80'	Report	Aurtenetxe 54'

Estádio José Alvalade, Lisbon
Attendance: 37,286
Referee: Jonas Eriksson (Sweden)
26 April 2012
21:05

Athletic Bilbao (Spain)	3–1	(Portugal) Sporting CP
Susaeta 17'; Ibai 45+1'; Llorente 88'	Report	Van Wolfswinkel 44'

San Mamés Stadium, Bilbao
Attendance: 37,598
Referee: Martin Atkinson (England)

Athletic Bilbao won 4–3 on aggregate.

== Final ==
The final was played on 9 May 2012 at the Arena Națională in Bucharest, Romania. A draw was held on 16 March 2012, after the quarter-final and semi-final draws, to determine the "home" team for administrative purposes.

9 May 2012
20:45 (21:45 UTC+3)

Atlético Madrid (Spain)	3–0	(Spain) Athletic Bilbao
Falcao 7', 34'; Diego 85'	Report

Arena Națională, Bucharest
Attendance: 52,347
Referee: Wolfgang Stark (Germany)
