= Roberto Soldado =

Spanish footballer (born 1985)

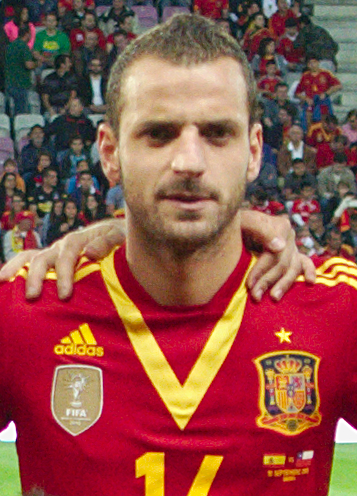
- Soldado lining up for Spain in 2013

Personal information
- Full name: Roberto Soldado Rillo
- Date of birth: 27 May 1985 (age 41)
- Place of birth: Valencia, Spain
- Height: 1.79 m (5 ft 10 in)
- Position: Striker

Youth career
- 1990–2000: Don Bosco
- 2000–2002: Real Madrid

Senior career*
Years	Team	Apps	(Gls)
2002–2006	Real Madrid B	120	(64)
2005–2008	Real Madrid	16	(2)
2006–2007	→ Osasuna (loan)	30	(11)
2008–2010	Getafe	60	(29)
2010–2013	Valencia	101	(59)
2013–2015	Tottenham Hotspur	52	(7)
2015–2017	Villarreal	38	(9)
2017–2019	Fenerbahçe	47	(15)
2019–2021	Granada	62	(16)
2021–2023	Levante	43	(5)
Total		569	(217)

International career
2001	Spain U15	2	(0)
2001–2003	Spain U17	18	(12)
2003	Spain U18	3	(3)
2002–2004	Spain U19	9	(5)
2004–2007	Spain U21	9	(6)
2007–2013	Spain	12	(7)
Medal record
Representing Spain
FIFA Confederations Cup
Runner-up	2013 Brazil
UEFA European Under-19 Championship
Winner	2004 Switzerland
- * Club domestic league appearances and goals

Roberto Soldado Rillo (Spanish pronunciation: [roˈβeɾto solˈdaðo ˈriʎo]; born 27 May 1985) is a Spanish former professional footballer who played as a striker.

After emerging through Real Madrid's youth system, he went on to appear in only 27 official matches for the first team (four goals). However, he became a more regular La Liga player and scorer for Osasuna, Getafe and Valencia, and secured a £26 million move to Tottenham Hotspur. After two unsuccessful seasons in England, he returned to the Spanish top division with Villarreal; over 13 seasons in the latter competition, he recorded figures of 325 games and 129 goals.

An international since 2007, Soldado represented Spain at the 2013 FIFA Confederations Cup.

== Club career ==
=== Real Madrid ===
Born in Valencia, Soldado joined Real Madrid at the age of 15 from native region small club CF Don Bosco. After years of prolific goalscoring with the former's reserves, he made his first-team debut on 23 October 2005 against Valencia, playing 18 minutes in a 1–2 home loss. Previously, on 28 September, he had scored an 86th-minute winner after just six minutes on the pitch in the group stage of the UEFA Champions League against Olympiacos (2–1 home win), adding a late equaliser against Osasuna and another in a 3–2 victory at Racing de Santander as Real finished second in the league, also netting in the 4–0 defeat of Athletic Bilbao in the Copa del Rey.

In 2005–06, with Castilla, Soldado scored 19 goals in Segunda División – two penalties – to become joint-second highest goalscorer alongside Ciudad de Murcia's José Juan Luque, one behind Ikechukwu Uche of Recreativo de Huelva. On 24 July 2006, he officially became the first member of Real Madrid to leave under new manager Fabio Capello and new president Ramón Calderón, moving to fellow La Liga side Osasuna on a season-long loan; he stated: "The idea is to leave and have a good season with a first division team scoring goals, and to develop as a footballer". His new team had finished fourth the previous campaign to earn themselves a place in the third qualifying round of the Champions League, hence he chose them over a number of other Spanish clubs competing for his presence. "The following year I want to return to the Real first team. I chose Osasuna because it gives me the chance to play in the Champions League", he said to Real Madrid's website after his signing; he finished with a total of 13 goals in all competitions, making him the Navarrese's top scorer.

Soldado returned to Real Madrid where, on 11 July 2007, he renewed his contract until 30 June 2012. In a 21 July interview with Spanish newspaper Diario AS, he revealed that he would be wearing number 9 shirt in his second stint: "During the preseason I'll be number 9, the number I've always dreamed of. When I step onto the pitch at the Bernabéu I'll remember all the hard work it took to get here". However, he finished the season with just five league appearances (one start, at Deportivo de La Coruña), the second with fewer minutes for the league champions.

=== Getafe ===
In late July 2008, Soldado was sold to Getafe for €4 million, signing a four-year deal with the club from the Madrid outskirts. He scored his first goal for them on 19 October in a 2–1 away loss against Málaga, adding two in another away defeat, with Osasuna (5–2), two months later; in between, he was sent off in a 0–3 home loss to Valencia for a headbutt on Carlos Marchena.

On 25 January 2009, Soldado scored a hat-trick as an early substitute, in a 5–1 home win over Sporting de Gijón. On 22 March, as Getafe struggled in the league, he scored twice to secure another home victory, 2–1 against Recreativo. The following month, he opened the 3–2 away defeat against his first employers.

Soldado started 2009–10 in impressive fashion, putting three goals past Racing Santander in a 4–1 away win. After a long scoring drought, he added three more against newly promoted Xerez in a 5–1 home victory.

On 19 December 2009, Soldado took his league tally to ten after scoring twice in a 2–1 defeat of Sevilla; with this achievement, he became Getafe's best ever scorer in the first division, surpassing Manu del Moral and Dani Güiza. He missed one month of competition due to injury but, in his return to action, scored from a bicycle kick, earning his side a point in the 1–1 home draw with Gijón.

=== Valencia ===
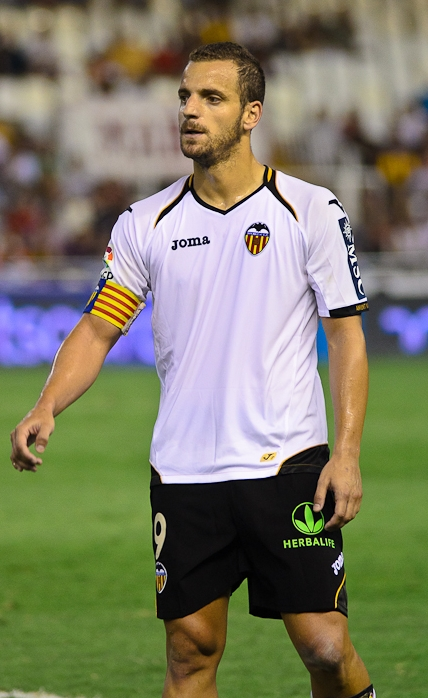
Soldado playing for Valencia in 2011

In early June 2010, after a successful year – 16 league goals, and qualification for the UEFA Europa League – Soldado returned to his hometown and signed for Valencia for €10 million, replacing Barcelona-bound David Villa. In his first official game, on 14 September, in the Champions League group phase, he contributed one goal in the Che's 4–0 win at Bursaspor. When the two teams met at the Mestalla Stadium in November, he netted two more in a 6–1 victory.

On 2 April 2011, Soldado scored all of Valencia's goals in a 4–2 away defeat of former club Getafe. In the next fixture, a local derby against Villarreal, he scored two more in a 5–0 home win. He finished the season as joint-fourth top scorer as his team ranked third and qualified for the Champions League.

In his first game of 2011–12, Soldado scored four goals against Racing Santander (one in his own net) in an eventual 4–3 home win – his last two arrived in the final three minutes. In late November 2011, in two home games separated by only five days, he added five more: two in a 2–3 home loss to Real Madrid and three in a 7–0 Champions League rout of Genk.

Soldado scored his 25th competitive goal of the campaign on 18 March 2012, netting all of his team's in a 3–0 win at Bilbao. In late June, he extended his contract until 2017.

On 23 October 2012, Soldado scored a hat-trick against BATE Borisov in a 3–0 victory in the Champions League group stage in Minsk.

=== Tottenham Hotspur ===
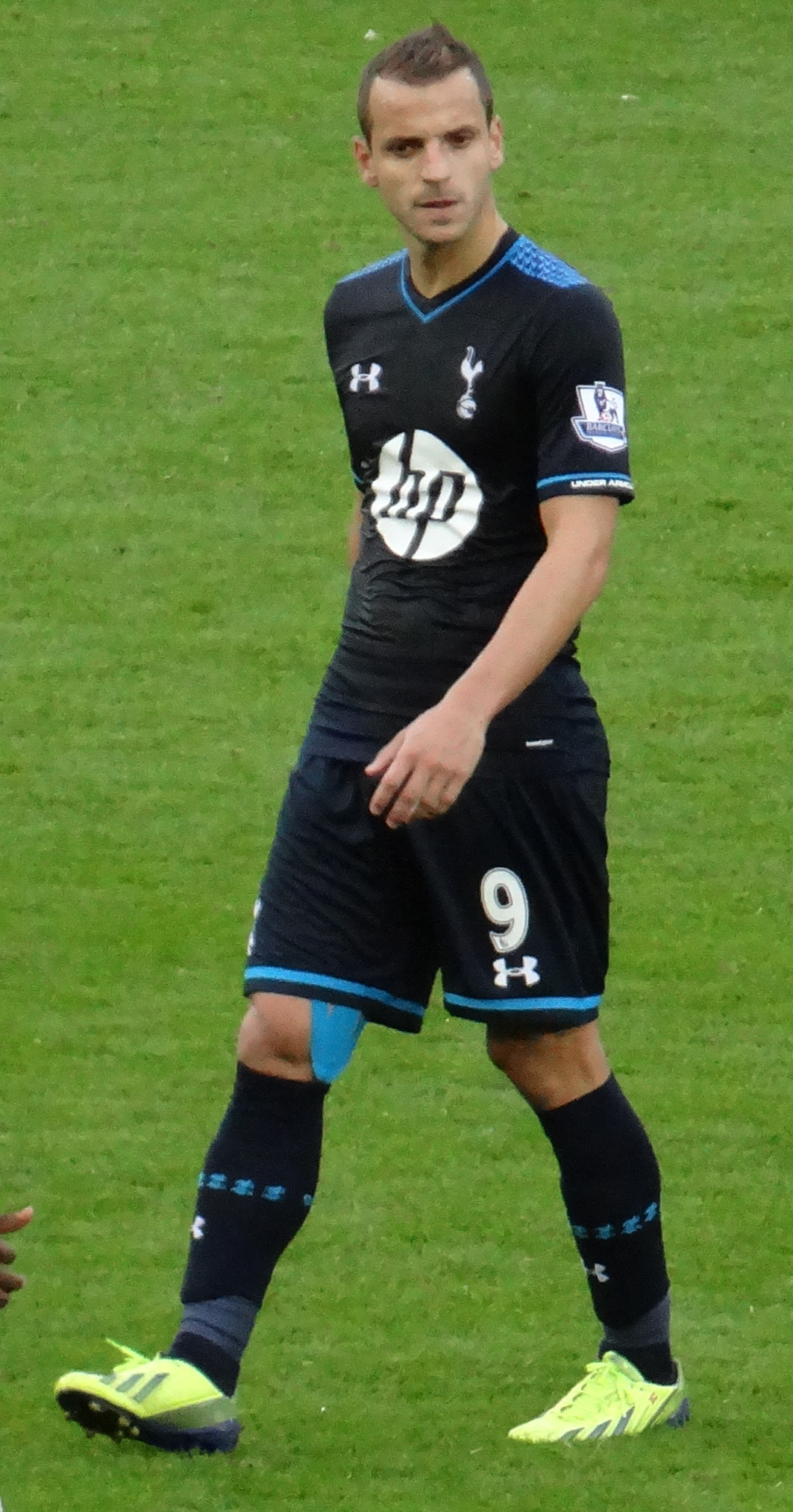
Soldado playing for Tottenham Hotspur in 2013

Valencia agreed a deal with Tottenham Hotspur for the transfer of Soldado on 1 August 2013, for a fee of £26 million, which would break the English club's previous record of £17 million paid for Paulinho earlier in the summer; the transfer was completed four days later after a successful medical. On his Premier League debut on 18 August, he scored through a penalty in a 1–0 win against Crystal Palace at Selhurst Park. Four days later, he netted a brace in a 5–0 victory at Dinamo Tbilisi in the playoff round of the Europa League.

On 20 October 2013, Soldado scored his first Premier League goal from open play, in a 2–0 victory against Aston Villa at Villa Park. Two months later, he netted his first hat-trick for the Spurs, against Anzhi Makhachkala in the Europa League group stage (4–1).

Soldado scored the only goal against relegation-threatened Cardiff City on 2 March 2014, his first in nine games. He netted just six times in the league in his debut season, only two of which came from open play, and was included in The Daily Telegraph website's list of the "10 worst buys of the Premier League season".

On 18 October 2014, making his first league start of the campaign, Soldado set up Christian Eriksen's goal during the match against Manchester City, also having a penalty saved by Joe Hart in an eventual 4–1 away loss. His first goal came on 30 November, the decisive in a 2–1 home defeat of Everton.

=== Villarreal ===
On 14 August 2015, Soldado returned to his country's top flight, signing a three-year contract with Villarreal for a reported £10 million. He scored in his very first appearance, helping to a 1–1 draw at Real Betis in which he started and retired injured midway through the second half.

On 13 December 2015, Soldado netted the game's only goal to help defeat his former club Real Madrid at the Estadio El Madrigal. He missed the vast majority of 2016–17, due to an anterior cruciate ligament injury to his right knee contracted in pre-season.

=== Fenerbahçe ===
On 11 August 2017, Fenerbahçe announced the signing of Soldado. After failing to find the net in his first ten games, he scored a hat-trick as a 61st-minute substitute on 19 November in a 4–1 home win over Sivasspor.

Soldado announced that he would not renew his contract on 2 June 2019.

=== Granada ===
On 15 July 2019, Soldado signed a one-year contract with recently promoted Granada, making him Diego Martínez's fourth signing of the summer transfer window. He made his competitive debut on 17 August, starting and scoring in a 4–4 draw against Villarreal, and remained a starter as the side qualified for Europe for the first time after a seventh-place finish. In April 2020, the club activated prematurely the contract clause that would keep him for another season.

On 17 September 2020, Soldado scored the first goal in the Andalusians' European history, in a 4–0 win at Albania's Teuta Durrës in the second qualifying round. He netted twice more in their run to the quarter-finals, one in each leg of a 3–2 aggregate victory over Norwegians Molde in the last 16.

=== Levante ===
Soldado joined Levante on 28 June 2021, on a two-year contract. He scored 11 times during his spell, also appearing in the unsuccessful 2023 promotion play-offs.

On 3 August 2023, Soldado announced his retirement from professional football at the age of 38.

== International career ==
Soldado represented Spain at all its youth levels, scoring a total of 26 goals. He was first called up to the first team in June 2007 for two UEFA Euro 2008 qualifiers, against Latvia and Liechtenstein, playing in both. He did not make it to the finals in Switzerland and Austria, however, as the nation emerged victorious.

On 29 February 2012, after nearly five years of absence, Soldado returned to the national team: he replaced Fernando Llorente at half-time of a friendly with Venezuela in Málaga, scoring twice after only seven minutes on the pitch; afterwards, he won a penalty and the sending off of Fernando Amorebieta, but missed the ensuing attempt, only to close the score at 5–0 in the 83rd minute.

Manager Vicente del Bosque selected Soldado for the 2013 FIFA Confederations Cup squad. He scored in the opener on 16 June, helping Spain to a 2–1 win over Uruguay.

== Career statistics ==
=== Club ===
Appearances and goals by club, season and competition
Club	Season	League			National cup (Note: Includes Copa del Rey, FA Cup, Turkish Cup)		League cup (Note: Includes Football League Cup)		Europe		Other		Total	
Club	Season	Division	Apps	Goals	Apps	Goals	Apps	Goals	Apps	Goals	Apps	Goals	Apps	Goals
Real Madrid B	2001–02	Segunda División B	0	0	—		—		—		3 (Note: Appearances in Segunda División B play-offs)	0	3	0
Real Madrid B	2002–03	Segunda División B	26	8	—		—		—		—		26	8
Real Madrid B	2003–04	Segunda División B	31	16	—		—		—		5	5	36	21
Real Madrid B	2004–05	Segunda División B	34	21	—		—		—		4	1	38	22
Real Madrid B	2005–06	Segunda División	29	19	—		—		—		—		29	19
Real Madrid B	Total		120	63	—		—		—		12	6	132	69
Real Madrid	2004–05	La Liga	0	0	2	0	—		0	0	—		2	0
Real Madrid	2005–06	La Liga	11	2	4	1	—		2 (Note: Appearances in UEFA Champions League)	1	—		17	4
Real Madrid	2007–08	La Liga	5	0	2	0	—		1	0	—		8	0
Real Madrid	Total		16	2	8	1	—		3	1	—		27	4
Osasuna (loan)	2006–07	La Liga	30	11	3	1	—		11 (Note: Two appearances in UEFA Champions League, nine appearances and one goal in UEFA Cup)	1	—		44	13
Getafe	2008–09	La Liga	34	13	0	0	—		—		—		34	13
Getafe	2009–10	La Liga	26	16	6	4	—		—		—		32	20
Getafe	Total		60	29	6	4	—		—		—		66	33
Valencia	2010–11	La Liga	34	18	3	1	—		7	6	—		44	25
Valencia	2011–12	La Liga	32	17	6	3	—		13 (Note: Six appearances and five goals in UEFA Champions League, seven appearances and one goal in UEFA Europa League)	6	—		51	26
Valencia	2012–13	La Liga	35	24	4	2	—		7	4	—		46	30
Valencia	Total		101	59	13	6	—		27	16	—		141	80
Tottenham Hotspur	2013–14	Premier League	28	6	1	0	0	0	7 (Note: Appearances in UEFA Europa League)	5	—		36	11
Tottenham Hotspur	2014–15	Premier League	24	1	3	0	5	2	8	2	—		40	5
Tottenham Hotspur	Total		52	7	4	0	5	2	15	7	—		76	16
Villarreal	2015–16	La Liga	28	5	3	1	—		13	2	—		44	8
Villarreal	2016–17	La Liga	10	4	0	0	—		1	0	—		11	4
Villarreal	Total		38	9	3	1	—		14	2	—		55	12
Fenerbahçe	2017–18	Süper Lig	26	9	6	3	—		2	0	—		34	12
Fenerbahçe	2018–19	Süper Lig	21	6	2	1	—		2	0	—		25	7
Fenerbahçe	Total		47	15	8	4	—		4	0	—		59	19
Granada	2019–20	La Liga	33	7	6	4	—		—		—		39	11
Granada	2020–21	La Liga	29	9	3	2	—		11	3	—		43	14
Granada	Total		62	16	9	6	—		11	3	—		82	25
Levante	2021–22	La Liga	18	3	2	3	—		—		—		20	6
Levante	2022–23	Segunda División	25	2	2	2	—		—		4 (Note: Appearances in La Liga play-offs)	1	31	5
Levante	Total		43	5	4	5	—		—		4	1	51	11
Career total			569	217	58	28	5	2	85	30	16	7	733	284

=== International ===
Appearances and goals by national team and year
National team	Year	Apps	Goals
Spain	2007	2	0
Spain	2012	5	4
Spain	2013	5	3
Total		12	7

Scores and results list Spain's goal tally first, score column indicates score after each Soldado goal.

List of international goals scored by Roberto Soldado
No.	Date	Venue	Cap	Opponent	Score	Result	Competition	Ref.
1	29 February 2012	La Rosaleda Stadium, Málaga, Spain	3	Venezuela	3–0	5–0	Friendly	
2	29 February 2012	La Rosaleda Stadium, Málaga, Spain	3	Venezuela	4–0	5–0	Friendly	
3	29 February 2012	La Rosaleda Stadium, Málaga, Spain	3	Venezuela	5–0	5–0	Friendly	
4	11 September 2012	Boris Paichadze Dinamo Arena, Tbilisi, Georgia	6	Georgia	1–0	1–0	2014 FIFA World Cup qualification	
5	11 June 2013	Yankee Stadium, New York City, United States	9	Republic of Ireland	1–0	2–0	Friendly	
6	16 June 2013	Arena Pernambuco, Recife, Brazil	10	Uruguay	2–0	2–1	2013 FIFA Confederations Cup	
7	10 September 2013	Stade de Genève, Geneva, Switzerland	12	Chile	1–1	2–2	Friendly	

== Honours ==
Real Madrid

- La Liga: 2007–08

Tottenham Hotspur

- Football League Cup runner-up: 2014–15

Spain U19

- UEFA European Under-19 Championship: 2004

Spain

- FIFA Confederations Cup runner-up: 2013

Individual

- Zarra Trophy (Segunda División): 2005–06
- Zarra Trophy (La Liga): 2011–12
