= Dynamo Charities Cup =

- Founded: 2009
- Region: Houston
- Teams: 2 (2009–)
- Current champions: (Mexico) Cruz Azul
- Most championships: (United States) Houston Dynamo (5 titles)

The Dynamo Charities Cup is an annual friendly match putting the Houston Dynamo against an international opponent, with a portion of the match’s proceeds donated to charity.

== Format ==
Each team will face each other only once at the host team's venue. A max of 10 substitutions are allowed; re-entry is not allowed unless a goalkeeper injury is sustained. If the match is tied after 90 minutes, a penalty shootout will be implemented.

== Venue ==
Only one city has served as the venue of the Dynamo Charities Cup. The Dynamo began play in their new stadium in May of the 2012 season.

| Houston, Texas | Houston, Texas |
|---|---|
| Robertson Stadium | BBVA Compass Stadium |
| Capacity: 32,000 | Capacity: 22,000 |
| 2009–2011 | 2012– |

== Charities Cup matches ==
=== Key ===
| † | Match decided by a penalty shootout |
| **Bold** | **Won their respective league within the year before or after Cup** |
| Italics | Sellout crowd |

=== Results ===
| Year | Home | Score | Away | Venue | Attendance |
|---|---|---|---|---|---|
| 2009 | (United States) Houston | 2–1 | (Mexico) **Monterrey**^{1} | Robertson Stadium | 10,456 |
| 2010 | (United States) Houston | 4–0 | (El Salvador) Águila | Robertson Stadium | 11,843 |
| 2011 | (United States) Houston | 0–2 | (England) Bolton | Robertson Stadium | 13,612 |
| 2012 | (United States) Houston | 1–2 | (Spain) Valencia | BBVA Compass Stadium | 22,039 |
| 2013 | (United States) Houston | 2–0 | (England) Stoke | BBVA Compass Stadium | 14,123 |
| 2014 | (United States) Houston | 0–1 | (England) Aston Villa | BBVA Compass Stadium | 20,514 |
| 2015 | (United States) Houston | 4–0 | **(Mexico) Santos Laguna**^{2} | BBVA Compass Stadium | 14,640 |
| 2016 | (United States) Houston | 3–3 (5–4 pen.) | (Spain) Real Sociedad^{2} | BBVA Compass Stadium | 13,675 |
| 2017 | (United States) Houston | 3-5 | (Mexico) Cruz Azul | BBVA Compass Stadium | 12,102 |
| 2018 | (United States) Houston | 1-2 | (Mexico) Monterrey | BBVA Compass Stadium | 12,102 |

- ^{1} - Won the Liga MX Apertura 2009 & Apertura 2010
- ^{2} – Won the Copa MX Apertura 2014, Liga MX Clausura 2015 & Campeón de Campeones 2014-15

Kickoff times are in CDT.

=== 2009: vs. Monterrey ===
| October 11, 2009 | **Houston (United States)** | **2 – 1** | **(Mexico) Monterrey** | Robertson Stadium; Houston, Texas |
| 20:00 CST | Cameron 63'; Oduro 85' | Report | 82' Zavala | Attendance: 10,456 |

=== 2010: vs. Águila ===
| June 19, 2010 | **Houston (United States)** | **4 – 0** | **(El Salvador) Águila** | Robertson Stadium; Houston, Texas |
| 20:00 CST | Ngwenya 16'; Ashe 28'; Oduro 67'; Landín 74' | Report | | Attendance: 11,843 |

=== 2011: vs. Bolton (Trans-Atlantic Challenge) ===
| July 20, 2011 | **Houston (United States)** | **0 – 2** | **(England) Bolton** | Robertson Stadium; Houston, Texas |
| 19:30 CST | | Report | 32' Klasnić; 58' Davies | Attendance: 13,612 |

=== 2012: vs. Valencia (BBVA Compass Cup) ===
| May 31, 2012 | **Houston (United States)** | **1 – 2** | **(Spain) Valencia** | BBVA Compass Stadium; Houston, Texas |
| 19:30 CST | Carr 14' | Report | 2' 17' Aduriz | Attendance: 22,039 |

=== 2013: vs. Stoke City (BBVA Compass Cup) ===
| July 24, 2013 | **Houston (United States)** | **2 - 0** | **(England) Stoke** | BBVA Compass Stadium; Houston, Texas |
| 20:00 CST | Driver 11'; Barnes 89' | Report | | Attendance: 14,123 |

=== 2014: vs. Aston Villa F.C (BBVA Compass Cup) ===
| July 26, 2014 | **Houston (United States)** | **0 - 1** | **(England) Aston Villa** | BBVA Compass Stadium; Houston, Texas |
| 20:00 CST | | | Bennett 41' | Attendance: 20,514 |

=== 2015: vs. Santos Laguna ===
| Oct 10, 2015 | **Houston (United States)** | **4 – 0** | **(Mexico) Santos Laguna** | BBVA Compass Stadium; Houston, Texas |
| 19:30 CST | Manotas 41', 50'; Hoffman 82', 84' | Report | | Attendance: 14,640; Referee: Nima Saghafi |

=== 2016: vs. Real Sociedad ===
| May 24, 2016 | **Houston (United States)** | **3 – 3** (**5 – 4** p) | **(Spain) Real Sociedad** | BBVA Compass Stadium; Houston, Texas |
| 18:15 CST | David Rocha 22'; Gonzalez 31' (o.g.); Manotas 49' | Report | Prieto 55'; Bautista 59'; Pardo 73' | Attendance: 13,675; Referee: Les Stalmach |
| | **Penalties** |
| | Penalty scored | | Penalty scored Penalty missed |

=== 2017: vs. Cruz Azul ===
| October 5, 2017 | **Houston (United States)** | **3 – 5** | **(Mexico) Cruz Azul** | BBVA Compass Stadium; Houston, Texas |
| 20:00 CST | Sánchez 10'; Manotas 48'; Remick 86' | Report | Méndez 15'; Cauteruccio 23'; Faurlín 57'; Silva 69'; Mora 85' | Attendance: 12,102; Referee: Kyle Phillips |

=== 2018: vs. Monterrey ===
| June 29, 2018 | **Houston (United States)** | **1 – 2** | **(Mexico) Monterrey** | BBVA Compass Stadium; Houston, Texas |
| | Conor Donovan 49' | Report | Alfonso González 64'; Luis Madrigal 90+1' | Attendance: 14,978; Referee: Jorge Luna Hernandez |
