= Adil Rami =

French footballer (born 1985)

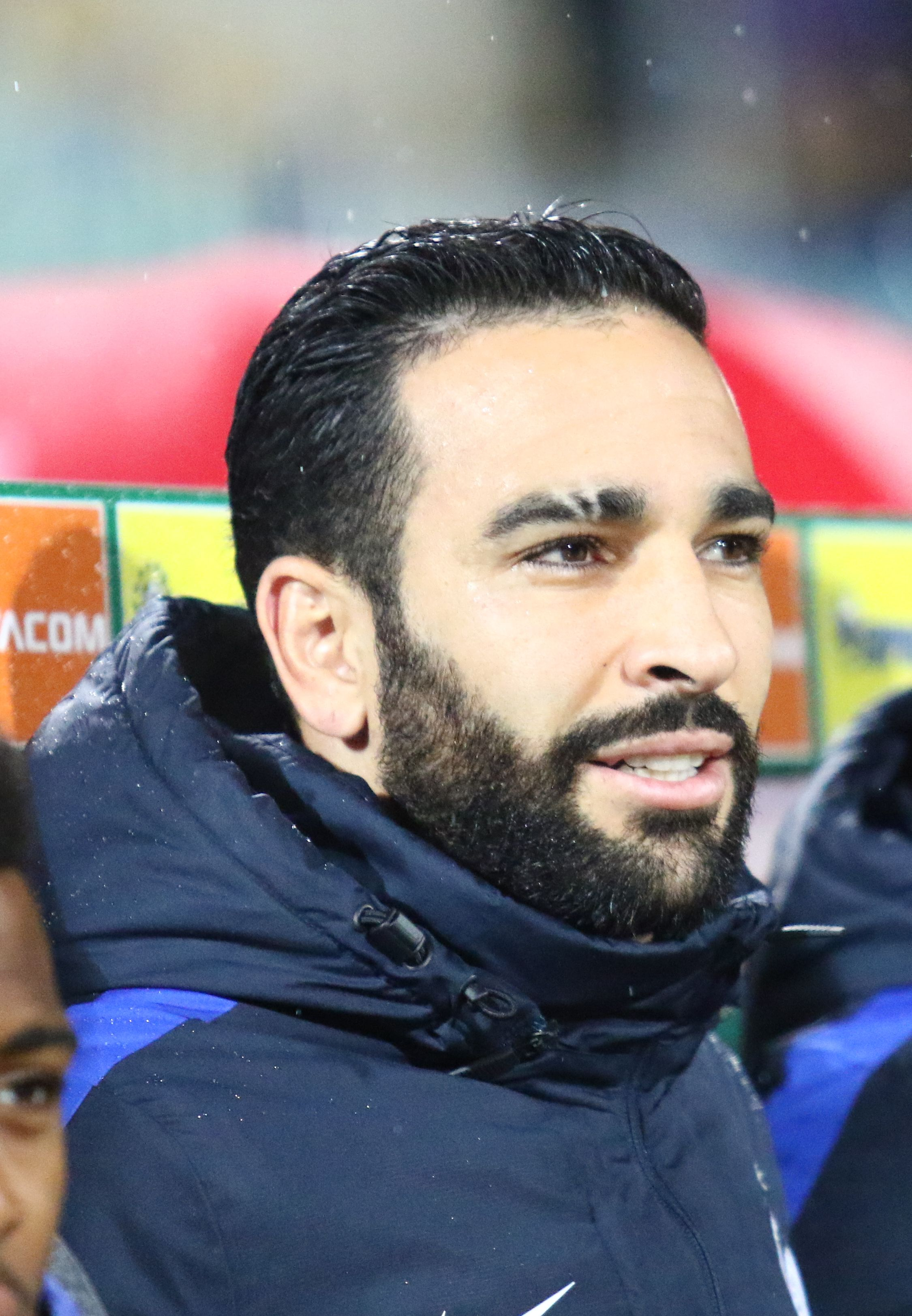
- Rami with France in 2017

Personal information
- Full name: Adil Rami
- Date of birth: 27 December 1985 (age 40)
- Place of birth: Bastia, France
- Height: 1.90 m (6 ft 3 in)
- Position: Centre-back

Youth career
- 1994–2003: Fréjus

Senior career*
Years	Team	Apps	(Gls)
2003–2006	Fréjus	58	(0)
2006–2011	Lille	163	(10)
2011–2014	Valencia	93	(8)
2014	→ AC Milan (loan)	22	(3)
2014–2015	AC Milan	22	(1)
2015–2017	Sevilla	49	(3)
2017–2019	Marseille	75	(3)
2019–2020	Fenerbahçe	7	(0)
2020	Sochi	0	(0)
2020–2021	Boavista	22	(0)
2021–2023	Troyes	39	(3)
Total		523	(31)

International career
2010–2018	France	36	(1)
Medal record
Men's football
Representing France
FIFA World Cup
Winner	2018 Russia
UEFA European Championship
Runner-up	2016 France
- * Club domestic league appearances and goals

Adil Rami (Arabic: عَادِل رَامِي; born 27 December 1985) is a French former professional footballer who played as a centre-back.

Rami began his football career playing for amateur club Étoile Fréjus Saint-Raphaël, then known as ES Fréjus. Due to playing the sport as only a hobby, he spent three seasons at the club playing in the Championnat de France amateur, the fourth division of French football. In 2006, Rami ascended three divisions after signing with Ligue 1 club Lille. At Lille, Rami developed into a starter, making his professional debut in May 2007. He is nicknamed "Shrek" by teammates and Lille supporters. In January 2011, Rami joined Spanish club Valencia on a four-year contract. However, he was immediately loaned back to his previous club and was a part of the Lille team which won the league and cup double.

Despite early inquiries from Morocco prior to his first selection, Rami chose to play for France. He was in the preliminary list to play for France at the 2010 FIFA World Cup finals but did not make the final squad. Rami made his senior debut on 11 August 2010 in a friendly match against Norway.

== Early life ==
Rami was born in the city of Bastia on the island of Corsica to Moroccan parents. He holds dual French and Moroccan citizenship. As a youth, his family moved to the mainland, eventually settling in the southern coast city of Fréjus, where his mother worked as a member of the city council. Rami is the third of four children and has two sisters and one brother. While training to become a professional football player, Rami worked for the city after his family grew concerned for his future. He often did odd-jobs such as taking care of the maintenance and cleanliness of the city.

== Club career ==
=== Early career ===
Rami registered as a youth player for Étoile Fréjus Saint-Raphaël, then known as ES Fréjus, in 1994 at the age of nine. Despite harbouring ambitions of playing football professionally, Rami played the sport as only a hobby and worked for city hall to support himself. He made his amateur debut for the club during the 2003–04 season while Fréjus were playing in the Championnat de France amateur, the fourth division of French football. He appeared in four matches in his first season. In the 2004–05 season, Rami appeared in 24 matches as Fréjus finished mid-table.

Ahead of the 2005–06 season, Rami switched to playing in central defence. He initially played as an offensive player often in the midfield, but following an injury to a teammate, whom Rami described as his best friend, his coaches inserted him into defence. The transition was a success, with Rami appearing in 30 matches with Fréjus finishing mid-table for the third consecutive season. Midway through the campaign, Rami was offered a trial by professional club Lille. Eager to leave the amateur club, he took the opportunity and after a week's training session with Lille, which Rami described as "hard", he was signed to an amateur contract with Fréjus receiving €10,000.

=== Lille ===
Upon his arrival to the club, Rami was inserted onto the club's Championnat de France amateur team and was supervised by coach Pascal Planque, who Rami stated gave him the best opportunity to grow as a player. Rami appeared in 27 matches as the team finished in third position, the highest finish amongst professional clubs' reserve team's playing in the group. With two months remaining in the 2006–07 Ligue 1 season, Rami was called up to the senior team by manager Claude Puel. He made his professional debut on 19 May 2007 in a Ligue 1 match against Auxerre, starting at centre-back. The following week, Rami started again, against Rennes. On 4 June, Rami signed his first professional contract after agreeing to a three-year deal lasting until 2010. He was then promoted to the senior squad on a permanent basis and assigned the number 23 shirt.

In the 2007–08 season, Rami was declared a starter by Puel and inserted at centre-back, alongside captain Grégory Tafforeau. In the opening match of the season, against Lorient, Rami featured in the match until the 69th minute, when he suffered an injury to ligaments in one of his knees. He subsequently missed three-and-a-half months due to the injury, returning in November 2007. Upon his return, Rami featured in every remaining match for Lille, save for one league match. Lille finished the campaign in seventh position, one spot out of Europe. After the season, Rami signed a two-year contract extension with the club.

For the 2008–09 season, Rami's Ligue 1 season debut against Nancy was halted in injury time after earning a straight red card. On 18 October 2008, he scored his first professional goal in a 2–2 draw against Lyon. The following month, Rami scored against Marseille in another 2–2 draw. On 1 February 2009, he scored the would-be game-winner against Bordeaux in the 57th minute. However, the goal was canceled out eight minutes later by Yoann Gourcuff to draw the match at 2–2. Rami's fourth and final goal of the season was the team's second goal in a 3–2 win over Nancy on the final day of the league season. The victory secured fifth place for Lille, which resulted in the club qualifying for the newly created UEFA Europa League.

Following the season, Rami drew considerable interest from several clubs, which included French clubs Marseille and Lyon, English clubs Liverpool and Arsenal and Italian club Milan. Despite suitable offers for the player, Lille chairman Michel Seydoux declared that Rami was not going to be leaving the club after a reported move to Marseille for €12 million was abruptly canceled in July 2009. The announcement led to a distraught and angry Rami declaring he would see out the rest of his contract with Lille playing in the reserves if he was not transferred. He even went as far as to state that there was a conspiracy between Lille and Lyon, due to the club's easy negotiations during transfers between each other, as well as Seydoux's brother, Jérôme, being a shareholder of Lyon. On 15 August 2009, Rami apologized for the comments and said he would remain at Lille.

Rami began the 2009–10 season again as a starter as Lille struggled early on due to its tough schedule, in which the team faced Marseille, Paris Saint-Germain and Toulouse in the first four weeks of the season. He made his UEFA Europa League debut on 30 July 2009 in the first leg of the club's third qualifying round match. Rami scored his first goal of the season on 19 September in the annual Derby du Nord match against Lens. With Lille trailing 1–0 in injury time at a hostile Stade Félix-Bollaert, Rami connected on a header following a corner kick in the 93rd minute to draw the match at 1–1, which was the final result. On 28 October, he scored his second goal against Saint-Étienne in a 4–0 victory after delivering a curling free-kick from almost 35 metres out. On 25 February 2010, Rami scored the aggregate-winning goal in the team's round of 32-second leg tie away to Fenerbahçe after connecting on a header five minutes from time.

=== Valencia ===
On 3 January 2011, Spanish club Valencia confirmed on its website it had reached an agreement with Lille for the transfer of Rami, with the La Liga outfit paying Lille a reported transfer fee believed to be in the range of €6–10 million. Rami finished the 2010–11 campaign with Lille on loan from Valencia and officially joined his parent club on 13 June after successfully passing a medical.

Rami made his debut for Valencia against Racing de Santander in a 4–3 home win. In the same match, he scored his first goal for the club from a corner kick, making it 2–3.

=== AC Milan ===
On 25 September 2013, Valencia temporarily suspended Rami from his contract after he gave an interview on Radio Valencia in which he openly criticised his teammates and his coach, Miroslav Đukić. He was also fined €275,000 (€130,000 net) of his remaining salary owed for the half of the season, the largest ever imposed by Valencia. Meanwhile, Rami left the Spanish club and started training with AC Milan. On 16 October 2013, Valencia gave him permission to train with the Italian club and an agreement was reached between the clubs that the player would be loaned to Milan when the winter transfer window opened, on 3 January 2014, with an option to purchase.

On 6 January 2014, Rami made his debut in Serie A, coming on as a substitute for Cristián Zapata in a match against Atalanta, a 3–0 win. On 1 February, he scored his first goal in Serie A, against Torino. On 23 February, he scored his second goal against Sampdoria. His third and last goal of the Serie A season came on 16 March, against Parma.

On 12 July 2014, Milan signed Rami on a three-year contract with a £3.37 million (€4.25 million) fee to Valencia. Rami personally paid €500,000 to cover the payment difference with Valencia, as Milan refused to pay the original buy-out clause of €7.5 million, only offering €3.75 million. He scored his first goal in the 2014–15 season on 28 September 2014 with a glancing header in a 1–1 draw with Cesena.

=== Sevilla ===
On 1 July 2015, Spanish newspaper Marca confirmed that Sevilla had reached an agreement with Milan to sign Rami for four seasons, with the transfer fee believed to be €3.5 million.

=== Marseille ===
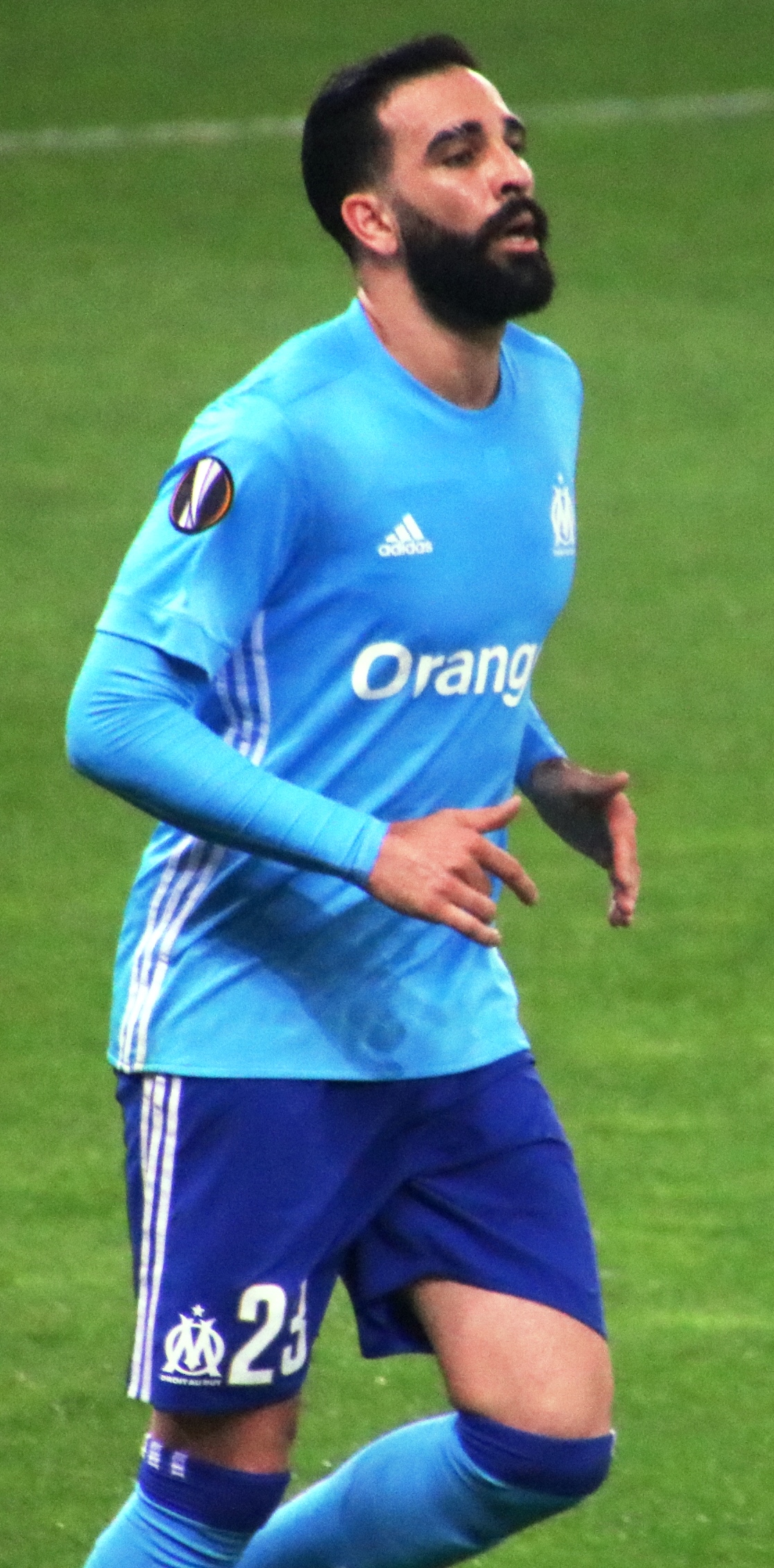
Rami playing for Marseille in 2018

On 13 July 2017, Rami joined Ligue 1 club Olympique de Marseille on a four-year contract for a €6 million transfer fee. On 27 July, he made his competitive debut for Marseille, in their 2017–18 UEFA Europa League third qualifying round, first leg match against Oostende at the Stade Vélodrome, playing the full 90 minutes of the 4–2 victory. He made his Ligue 1 debut for Marseille on 6 August in their home match against Dijon, again playing the full 90 minutes of the match, which Marseille won 3–0. On 14 September, he headed home Dimitri Payet's corner to score his first competitive goal for Marseille in their 2017–18 UEFA Europa League group stage 1–0 home win over Konyaspor. On 3 May 2018, he played every minute of the Europa League semi-final second leg match away to FC Red Bull Salzburg which Marseille lost 2–1 after extra-time but won 3–2 on aggregate to secure a place in the 2018 UEFA Europa League Final which was played at the Parc Olympique Lyonnais in Décines-Charpieu, Lyon, France on 16 May 2018, against Atlético Madrid. Rami played the full 90 minutes of the final, which Atlético Madrid won 3–0.

On 11 November 2018, Rami scored his first Ligue 1 goal of the 2018-19 season and also assisted the opening goal that was scored by Lucas Ocampos in the 2–0 home win over Dijon. On 19 December, Rami missed the last penalty of the penalty shoot-out of the 2018–19 Coupe de la Ligue round of 16 home match against Strasbourg, resulting in Marseille's elimination from the competition.

Rami was left out of Marseille's pre-season tour to the United States in the summer of 2019 and left out of the squad for the club's opening competitive match of the 2019–20 season on 10 August 2019 under newly appointed head coach André Villas-Boas, a 2–0 Ligue 1 home defeat to Stade de Reims. On 13 August 2019, Rami was sacked by Marseille for 'gross misconduct'. He had been under investigation by the club for missing a training session at the end of the 2018–19 season after claiming that he had an injury. But on the same day as the missed training session, Rami took part in the recording of an episode of the French TV game show Fort Boyard where contestants compete in a set of challenges to win prize money, including participation in a variation of mud wrestling and performing demanding physical stunts.

=== Fenerbahçe ===
On 27 August 2019, 2 weeks after being sacked by Olympique de Marseille for 'gross misconduct' and as a free agent, Rami signed a short-term contract with Turkish Süper Lig club Fenerbahçe that would run until the end of the 2019–20 season and included the option of a second season.

=== Sochi ===
On 21 February 2020, by mutual agreement with the club, he terminated his contract with Fenerbahçe and joined the Russian team PFC Sochi on the same day. While the championship was stopped because of the COVID-19 pandemic, his contract was terminated on 27 May 2020 without his having played a single match. Rami claims not to have been paid.

=== Boavista ===
After terminating his contract with Sochi, Rami went to Portugal's top flight by joining Boavista on a two-year deal on 4 September 2020 meeting his friend Ricardo Costa. He played 22 games and left by mutual accord the following 29 July.

=== Troyes ===
On 24 August 2021, Rami signed with Ligue 1 side Troyes on a one-year deal.

== International career ==
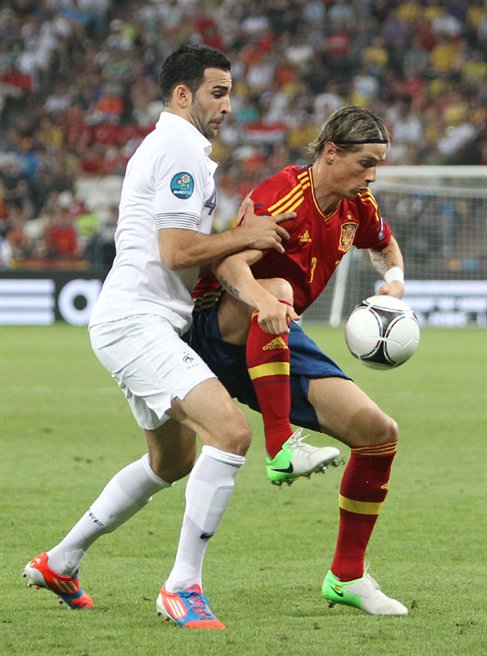
Rami (left) playing for France at UEFA Euro 2012

Rami is a French international, having made his debut on 11 August 2010 in a friendly match against Norway. Prior to representing France, he drew interest from the Moroccan national team. Ahead of the 2008 Africa Cup of Nations, Rami was offered a chance to play with Morocco at the competition by manager Henri Michel. However, Rami declined the offer, citing his ambition to play for France. He has stated on several occasions that he would prefer to "represent Morocco within the France team".

On 20 March 2008, Rami received his first call-up to the France national team by then head coach Raymond Domenech for a friendly match against England. Rami was informed of the call-up by Lille teammate and captain Rio Mavuba, which Rami initially considered a joke. The call-up was indeed considered surprising by the French media and supporters, as Rami had only played 17 Ligue 1 matches. Rami featured with the B team in its friendly against Mali on 25 March 2008. Due to the match being unofficial, Rami was again offered the chance to play for Morocco after being called up for the team's friendly match against the Czech Republic on 11 February 2009 by new manager Roger Lemerre. Rami again declined the opportunity. On 19 March, he was called up again by Lemerre for the team's FIFA World Cup qualification match against Gabon. For the third time, Rami declined the opportunity and later accepted his call-up to the France squad for its FIFA World Cup qualification matches against Lithuania. On 11 May 2010, despite having not made a single appearance for France, Rami was named to the 30-man preliminary list by Domenech to play in the 2010 FIFA World Cup finals, but failed to make the final 23-men squad.

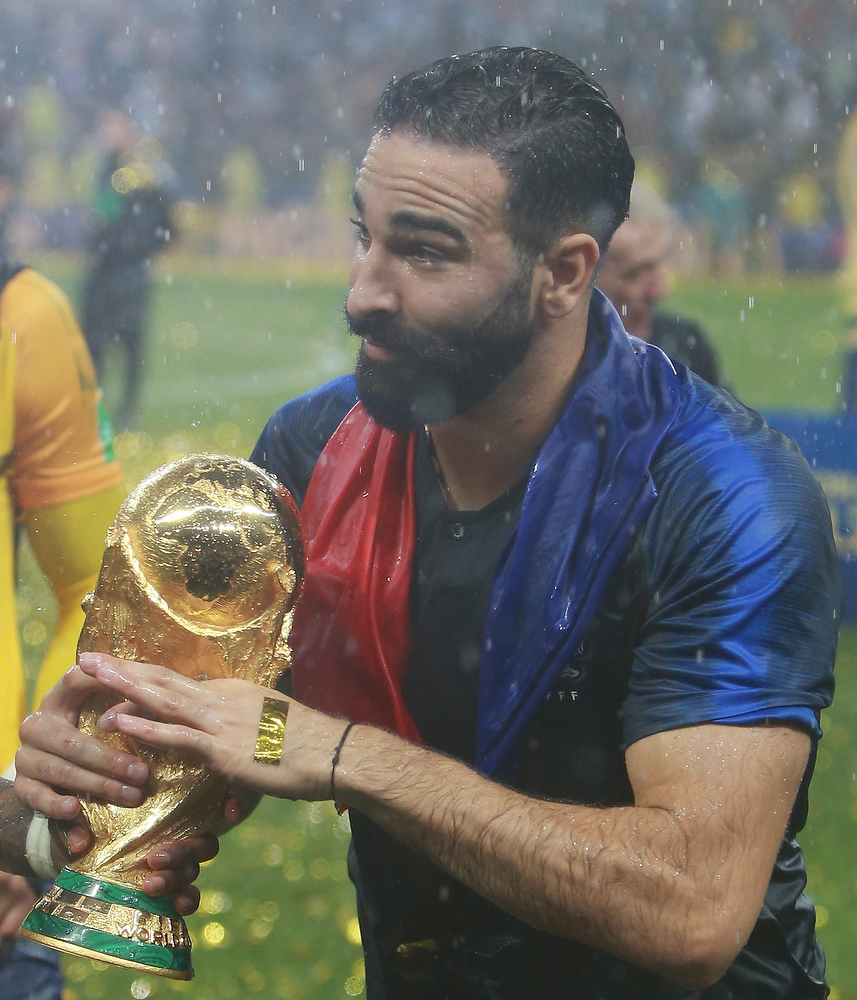
Rami holding the FIFA World Cup Trophy in 2018

On 5 August 2010, Rami was called up to the senior team by the new manager Laurent Blanc for the team's friendly match against Norway on 11 August 2010. He earned his first senior cap in that match, starting at centre-back alongside Philippe Mexès. After appearing regularly in UEFA Euro 2012 qualifying, on 29 May 2012, Rami was named to the squad to participate in the finals of that competition. Two days earlier, he had scored his first international goal in a 3–2 friendly comeback win over Iceland. Rami made his debut in the finals of a World Cup or UEFA European Championship on 11 June in his team's Euro 2012 opening match against England. He started and played the entire match, which ended in a 1–1 draw. He also played every minute of France's last three matches of the tournament – the remaining two Group D matches against Ukraine and Sweden, and the quarter-final against defending champions – and eventual winners – Spain.

Rami took part in the finals of the UEFA Euro 2016 tournament, called up to replace the injured Raphaël Varane, Rami played every minute of the first four matches (group stage and round of 16) of the finals, against Romania, Albania, Switzerland and the Republic of Ireland. However, he did not play the quarter-final, semi-final and final matches against Iceland, Germany and Portugal respectively. The host-nation France finished as runners-up of the tournament after losing to Portugal 1–0 after extra time in the final.

On 17 May 2018, Rami was called up to the 23-man French squad for the 2018 World Cup finals in Russia. He announced his retirement from the national team after winning the trophy. Rami was the only unused outfield player in that tournament.

Despite his retirement announcement, Rami was named in Deschamps' squad for three of the four league phase matches of the inaugural 2018–19 UEFA Nations League against Germany and the Netherlands. He was an unused substitute for all those three matches, with France failing to reach the finals that was held in Portugal.

== Post-playing career ==
In 2025 Rami was a contestant on season 14 of Danse avec les stars. He reached the final and came third. Rami was also a contestant on season four of Les Traîtres in 2025.

== Personal life ==
Rami is the father of twins, Zayn and Madi (b. 2016), with former companion Sidonie Biémont. In 2017, he began dating actress Pamela Anderson and as of November 2018, the two were living together in a mansion in Cassis, near Marseille, in the French Riviera. In June 2019, Anderson accused him of domestic abuse in an Instagram post, and stated that they had ended their relationship.

Rami is a Muslim, and his parents are Moroccan.

== Career statistics ==
=== Club ===
As of match played 21 May 2023

Club	Season	League			National Cup		League Cup		Europe		Other		Total	
Club	Season	Division	Apps	Goals	Apps	Goals	Apps	Goals	Apps	Goals	Apps	Goals	Apps	Goals
Fréjus	2003–04	Championnat National 2	4	0	0	0	—		—		—		4	0
Fréjus	2004–05	Championnat National 2	24	0	0	0	—		—		—		24	0
Fréjus	2005–06	Championnat National 2	30	0	0	0	—		—		—		30	0
Fréjus	Total		58	0	0	0	—		—		—		58	0
Lille	2006–07	Ligue 1	2	0	0	0	0	0	—		—		2	0
Lille	2007–08	Ligue 1	24	0	3	0	0	0	—		—		27	0
Lille	2008–09	Ligue 1	33	5	4	0	1	0	—		—		38	5
Lille	2009–10	Ligue 1	34	3	0	0	2	1	13	1	—		49	5
Lille	2010–11	Ligue 1	36	0	4	0	2	0	5	0	—		47	0
Lille	Total		129	8	11	0	5	1	18	1	—		163	10
Valencia	2011–12	La Liga	33	2	7	0	—		13	2	—		53	4
Valencia	2012–13	La Liga	25	0	5	1	—		6	1	—		36	2
Valencia	2013–14	La Liga	3	0	0	0	—		1	0	—		4	0
Valencia	Total		61	2	12	1	—		20	3	—		93	6
Milan (loan)	2013–14	Serie A	18	3	2	0	—		2	0	—		22	3
Milan	2014–15	Serie A	21	1	1	0	—		—		—		22	1
Milan	Total		39	4	3	0	—		2	0	—		44	4
Sevilla	2015–16	La Liga	28	0	6	2	—		11	1	1	0	46	3
Sevilla	2016–17	La Liga	21	0	3	0	—		7	0	2	0	33	0
Sevilla	Total		49	0	9	2	—		18	1	3	0	79	3
Marseille	2017–18	Ligue 1	33	1	3	0	0	0	18	1	0	0	54	2
Marseille	2018–19	Ligue 1	16	1	0	0	1	0	4	0	0	0	21	1
Marseille	Total		49	2	3	0	1	0	22	1	0	0	75	3
Fenerbahçe	2019–20	Süper Lig	1	0	6	0	—		0	0	0	0	7	0
Boavista	2020–21	Primeira Liga	22	0	0	0	—		—		—		22	0
Troyes	2021–22	Ligue 1	17	3	1	0	—		—		—		18	3
Troyes	2022–23	Ligue 1	20	0	1	0	—		—		—		21	0
Troyes	Total		37	3	2	0	—		—		—		39	3
Career total			445	19	46	3	6	1	80	6	3	0	580	29

=== International ===
As of match played 20 November 2018

National team	Year	Apps	Goals
France	2010	6	0
France	2011	10	0
France	2012	8	1
France	2013	2	0
France	2014	0	0
France	2015	0	0
France	2016	7	0
France	2017	0	0
France	2018	3	0
Total		36	1

As of 27 May 2012

List of international goals scored by Adil Rami
No.	Date	Venue	Opponent	Score	Result	Competition
1	27 May 2012	Stade du Hainaut, Valenciennes, France	Iceland	3–2	3–2	Friendly

== Honours ==
Lille

- Ligue 1: 2010–11
- Coupe de France: 2010–11

Sevilla

- UEFA Europa League: 2015–16
- Copa del Rey runner-up: 2015–16

Marseille

- UEFA Europa League runner-up: 2017–18

France

- FIFA World Cup: 2018
- UEFA European Championship runner-up: 2016

Individual

- UNFP Ligue 1 Team of the Season: 2010–11
- UEFA Europa League Squad of the Season: 2015–16

Orders

- Knight of the Legion of Honour: 2018

== See also ==
- List of Corsican people
