= SomTV =

Andorran subscription television service

SomTV is the fibre optic television offer in Andorra distributed by the sole operator, Andorra Telecom.

It offers free Spanish and French channels as well as the Movistar Plus+ package.

Andorra Telecom is also in charge of broadcasting digital terrestrial television throughout the country.

== Channel list ==
In addition to the basic package (Mini), it is possible to subscribe to the Movistar+ packages:

- Movistar+ Selección
- Cine
- Several sport packs (Futbol, MotoGP, Golf and Formula 1)
- Single channels (Mezzo, Playboy TV)
- Movistar+ Total Plus: all Movistar+ channels

=== Cinema ===
Channel number	Name	Owner	Bouquet
1	#0 por M+	Telefónica	Movistar+ Selección
2	Estrenos por M+	Telefónica	Cine
3	Estrenos 2 por M+	Telefónica	Cine
4	Fest por M+	Telefónica	Cine
8	Clásicos por M+	Telefónica	Cine
9	Acción por M+	Telefónica	Cine
10	Comedia por M+	Telefónica	Cine
11	Drama por M+	Telefónica	Cine
12	Cine Español por M+	Telefónica	Cine
13	TCM	Turner Broadcasting System	Movistar+ Selección
14	Canal Hollywood	AMC Networks	Movistar+ Selección
15	SundanceTV	AMC Networks	Movistar+ Selección

=== Series ===
20	Series por M+	Telefónica	Movistar+ Selección
21	Series 2 por M+	Telefónica	Movistar+ Selección
26	Fox	Fox Networks Group	Movistar+ Selección
27	AXN	Sony Entertainment Television	Movistar+ Selección
28	TNT	Turner Broadcasting System	Movistar+ Selección
29	Comedy Central	ViacomCBS Networks EMEAA	Movistar+ Selección
30	Calle 13	Universal Networks International	Movistar+ Selección
31	Cosmo	Universal Networks International	Movistar+ Selección
33	AXN White	Sony Entertainment Television	Movistar+ Selección
34	Syfy	Universal Networks International	Movistar+ Selección
35	AMC	AMC Networks	Movistar+ Selección

=== Children ===
40 (formerly)	Disney Channel	The Walt Disney Company Iberia	Movistar+ Selección
41 (formerly)	Disney XD	The Walt Disney Company Iberia	Movistar+ Selección
42	Nickelodeon	ViacomCBS Networks EMEAA	Movistar+ Selección
43	Nick Jr. Channel	ViacomCBS Networks EMEAA	Movistar+ Selección
44	DreamWorks	Universal Networks International	Movistar+ Selección
45	Baby TV	Fox Networks Group	Movistar+ Selección
46	Disney Junior	The Walt Disney Company Iberia	Movistar+ Selección
47 (formerly)	Canal Panda	AMC Networks	Movistar+ Selección
48 (formerly)	Cartoon Network	Turner Broadcasting System España	Movistar+ Selección
49	Clan	Radiotelevisión Española	Mini
50	Cartoonito	Turner Broadcasting System España	Movistar+ Selección
51	Lolly Kids		Mini

=== Documentary ===
60	National Geographic	Fox Networks Group	Movistar+ Selección
62	Discovery Channel	Discovery Communications	Movistar+ Selección
63	Historia	A&E Television Networks	Movistar+ Selección
64	Odisea	A&E Television Networks	Movistar+ Selección
66	Crimen + Investigación	A&E Television Networks	Movistar+ Selección
67	National Geographic Wild	Fox Networks Group	Movistar+ Selección
68	Blaze	AMC Networks	Movistar+ Selección
69	Canal Cocina	AMC Networks	Movistar+ Selección
70	Decasa	AMC Networks	Movistar+ Selección

=== Music ===
82	MTV 00s	ViacomCBS Networks EMEAA	Movistar+ Selección
87	Mezzo	Groupe Canal+ / Groupe Les Échos-Le Parisien	Mezzo
88	Mezzo Live HD	Groupe Canal+ / Groupe Les Échos-Le Parisien	Mezzo

=== Hunting and fishing ===
90	Caza y Pesca	Telefónica	Motor

=== Catalan ===
100	ATV	Ràdio i Televisió d'Andorra	Mini
101	TV3	Televisió de Catalunya	Mini
102	Super3/El 33	Televisió de Catalunya	Mini
103	Esport3	Televisió de Catalunya	Mini
104	3/24	Televisió de Catalunya	Mini
105	8TV	OC 2022	Mini

=== Spanish ===
111	La 1	Radiotelevisión Española	Mini
112	La 2	Radiotelevisión Española	Mini
113	Antena 3	Atresmedia	Mini
114	Cuatro	Mediaset España	Mini
115	Telecinco	Mediaset España	Mini
116	LaSexta	Atresmedia	Mini
118	Mega	Atresmedia	Mini
119	Neox	Atresmedia	Mini
120	Factoría de Ficción	Mediaset España	Mini
121	Nova	Atresmedia	Mini
122	Divinity	Mediaset España	Mini
123	Energy	Mediaset España	Mini
124	Boing	Mediaset España	Mini
125	MTV	ViacomCBS Networks EMEAA	Mini
126	DMAX	Discovery Communications	Mini
127	Paramount Network	ViacomCBS Networks EMEAA	Mini
128	DKISS	Grupo KISS	Mini
129	Be Mad	Mediaset España	Mini
130	TEN	Grupo Secuoya	Mini
131	TRECE	Radio Popular	Mini
133	Atreseries	Atresmedia	Mini

=== French ===
141	TF1	Groupe TF1	Mini
142	France 2	France Télévisions	Mini
143	France 3	France Télévisions	Mini
144	France Info	France Télévisions	Mini
145	France 5	France Télévisions	Mini
146	M6	Groupe M6	Mini
147	Arte	Arte France	Mini
149	W9	Groupe M6	Mini
150	TFX	Groupe TF1	Mini
151	TMC	Groupe TF1	Mini
153	Gulli	Groupe M6	Mini
155	BFM TV	NextRadioTV	Mini
156	TV5 Monde	TV5 Monde SA	Mini

=== International ===
160	RTP Internacional	Rádio e Televisão de Portugal	Mini
161	TVI Internacional	Media Capital	Mini
169	Pirineus TV	Cadena Pirenaica de Ràdio i Televisió	Mini
170	TV Galicia	Televisión de Galicia	Mini
174	Canal Sur Televisión	Radio y Televisión de Andalucía	
177	Cubavisión Internacional	Instituto Cubano de Radio y Televisión	Movistar+ Selección

=== Information ===
180	BBC World News	BBC	Mini
181	CNN International	Turner Broadcasting System	Mini
182	CNBC Europe	NBCUniversal	Movistar+ Selección
183	Euronews	EuronewsNBC	Movistar+ Selección
184	Bloomberg TV	Bloomberg LP	Movistar+ Selección
185	Fox News	Fox Networks Group	Movistar+ Selección
186	NHK World-Japan	NHK	Movistar+ Selección
187	RT	TV-Novosti	Movistar+ Selección
188	Al Jazeera	Al Jazeera Media Network	Movistar+ Selección
189	Canal 24 horas	Radiotelevisión Española	Mini
191	France 24	France Médias Monde	Mini
192	I24news	Altice	Movistar+ Selección

=== Sport ===
201	#Vamos por M+	Telefónica	Movistar+ Selección	
202	LaLiga por M+	Telefónica	La Liga	
203	LaLiga por M+ UHD	Telefónica	La Liga	
204	Liga de Campeones por M+ UHD	Telefónica	Liga de Campeones	
205	Liga de Campeones por M+	Telefónica	Liga de Campeones	
206	GOL PLAY	Mediapro	Movistar+ Selección	
213	Deportes por M+	Telefónica	Movistar+ Selección	
220	Golf por M+	Telefónica	Movistar+ Selección	Golf
230	DAZN F1	DAZN	Motor	
231	DAZN 1	DAZN	Motor	
232	DAZN 2	DAZN	Motor	
233	DAZN 3	DAZN	Motor	
234	DAZN 4	DAZN	Motor	
240	Eurosport 1	Discovery Communications	Movistar Liga de Campeones	
243	Eurosport 2	Discovery Communications	Movistar Liga de Campeones	
246	Barça TV	FC Barcelona	Movistar Liga de Campeones	
247	Real Madrid TV	Real Madrid CF / Telefónica	Movistar Liga de Campeones	
250	Teledeporte	Radiotelevisión Española	Mini	

=== Adulte ===
269	Cine X		Movistar+ Selección
270	Playboy TV	MindGeek	Playboy TV

=== Sport multicanaux ===
271	Deportes 1 por M+	Telefónica	Movistar Selección
272	Deportes 2 por M+	Telefónica	Movistar Selección
273	Deportes 3 por M+	Telefónica	Movistar Selección
274	Deportes 4 por M+	Telefónica	Movistar Selección
275	Deportes 5 por M+	Telefónica	Movistar Selección
276	Deportes 6 por M+	Telefónica	Movistar Selección
277	Deportes 7 por M+	Telefónica	Movistar Selección
281	LaLiga 1 por M+	Telefónica	La Liga
282	LaLiga 2 por M+	Telefónica	La Liga
283	LaLiga 3 por M+	Telefónica	La Liga
284	LaLiga 4 por M+	Telefónica	La Liga
285	LaLiga 5 por M+	Telefónica	La Liga
286	LaLiga 6 por M+	Telefónica	La Liga
287	LaLiga 7 por M+	Telefónica	La Liga
288	LaLiga 8 por M+	Telefónica	La Liga
289	LaLiga 9 por M+	Telefónica	La Liga
290	LaLiga 10 por M+	Telefónica	La Liga
291	Liga de Campeones 1 por M+	Telefónica	Liga de Campeones
292	Liga de Campeones 2 por M+	Telefónica	Liga de Campeones
293	Liga de Campeones 3 por M+	Telefónica	Liga de Campeones
294	Liga de Campeones 4 por M+	Telefónica	Liga de Campeones
295	Liga de Campeones 5 por M+	Telefónica	Liga de Campeones
296	Liga de Campeones 6 por M+	Telefónica	Liga de Campeones
297	Liga de Campeones 7 por M+	Telefónica	Liga de Campeones
298	Liga de Campeones 8 por M+	Telefónica	Liga de Campeones
