= Canal+ (Spanish TV channel) =

Spanish television channel

- Country: Spain
- Broadcast area: Nationwide
- Network: Movistar+
- Headquarters: Tres Cantos, Spain

Programming
- Language: Spanish
- Picture format: 576i SDTV; 1080i HDTV

Ownership
- Owner: Telefónica (2015-2016); PRISA TV (1990-2015)
- Sister channels: Canal+ Liga, Canal+ Liga Multi, Canal+ Liga de Campeones, Canal+ Fútbol, Canal+ Deportes, Canal+ Deportes 2 HD, Canal+ Golf, Sportmanía, Canal+ Acción, Canal+ Comedia, Canal+ DCine Canal+ Xtra, Canal+ Toros, Canal+ 3D, Canal+ Yomvi, 40 TV

History
- Launched: 8 June 1990; 36 years ago (trial transmissions); 14 September 1990; 36 years ago (regular programming)
- Closed: 1 February 2016; 10 years ago
- Replaced by: #0
- Former names: Canal+ 1 (2011-2015)

Links
- Website: www.canalplus.es

Canal+ was a Spanish commercial television channel operated by Sogecable, before its eventual sale to Telefónica. It was available on the digital satellite television and IPTV platform Movistar+.

== History ==
Canal+ began its trial transmissions on June 8, 1990, and it launched as a regular channel on September 14 of the same year as a terrestrial channel in Spain. Similar to its French counterpart, the channel broadcast most of its content encrypted, forcing the usage of a decoder to view all programming on the channel properly. The Spanish version was already using the Nagravision encryption system at launch alongside the Syster decoder, while the French version would not implement it until two years later.

In 1997, new channels using the Canal+ brand were launched in Spain, following the launch of Canal Satélite Digital. Just as on the other markets where Canal+ was present, the channels were named after colours: Canal+ Rojo (Canal+ Red) and Canal+ Azul (Canal+ Blue). A special channel broadcasting content in 16:9 aspect ratio was launched later, but it was replaced by a time-shift channel in 2001, Canal+ 30. In 2003, due to the relaunch of Canal Satélite Digital as Digital+, the colour channels were replaced with the second channel called Canal+ 2 and three dedicated movie channels and three dedicated sports channels.

In 2005, the Spanish government agreed to a change in the license terms for the channel. The permission to change the channel from a mostly encrypted channel to a 24-hour free-to-air channel was officially given by the council of ministers on 29 July 2005. From November 2005, its analogue terrestrial frequencies were given to Sogecable's new channel named Cuatro ("Four"), while Canal+ would become, for the time being, an exclusive channel to Digital+.

A High-definition version of Canal+ (Canal+ HD) began airing in 2008. In 2010, it became the first Spanish channel to offer 3D TV through Canal+ 3D. Around the same time, Canal+ begun to be offered in other pay-TV operators in Spain outside of Digital+, and in 2011 the channel was renamed as Canal+ 1.

Since 2011 Canal+ began broadcasting exclusive HBO series like Game of Thrones, Mildred Pierce, Luck, Boardwalk Empire, True Blood and Hung. That deal ended in 2016 when HBO confirmed the launch of its own streaming platform in Spain, HBO España, later replaced by HBO Max.

On 8 July 2015, following Canal+'s acquisition by Telefónica and the creation of Movistar+, cable providers outside of Movistar+, stopped carrying the channel, and it reverted to its original name of Canal+.

From 1 February 2016, it was replaced by a new channel, #0 (Cero), due to Telefónica declining to renew rights to use the Canal+ brand from Vivendi, the owners of Canal+ France. All other spanish Canal+ branded channels also dropped the brand by August, carrying the Movistar name instead.

== Programming ==
=== Original programming ===
- Crematorio
- Falcón
- Las Noticias del Guiñol
- Lo + Plus
- El Dia Despues
- ¿Qué fue de Jorge Sanz?

=== Acquired programming ===
- Angry Boys
- Animaniacs
- Archer
- Banshee
- Beavis and Butthead
- Beetlejuice (TV series)
- Boss
- Boardwalk Empire
- The Crimson Petal and the White
- Come Fly with Me
- Damages
- Dates
- Eastbound & Down
- Enlightened
- Entourage
- Episodes
- Frasier
- Friends
- Fringe
- Game of Thrones
- Girls
- House of Cards
- How to Make It in America
- Hung
- The IT Crowd
- Little Britain
- Louie
- Luck
- Mad Men
- Mildred Pierce
- The Newsroom
- The Pacific
- Pan Am
- Phantom 2040
- Political Animals
- Portlandia
- Ray Donovan
- Romanzo criminale – La serie
- Rubicon
- Rugrats
- Shameless
- Seinfeld
- Spartacus
- The Ren and Stimpy Show
- The Sopranos
- Todos contra Juan
- True Blood
- The Tudors
- Veep
- Web Therapy
- Weeds

== See also ==
- Groupe Canal+
