= 2007 in Spanish television =

This is a list of Spanish television related events in 2007.

== Events ==
- Unknown: TV channel IB Sat starts broadcasting.
- 1 January: TV channel TVE 50 Anos stops broadcasting.
- 15 January: Luis Fernández Fernández is appointed President of Radiotelevisión Española.
- 1 February: TV channels Canal+ Deporte 2, Canal+ Comedia and Accion por Movistar Plus+ starts broadcasting.
- 5 July: Conflict between Sogecable and La Sexta about Broadcasting rights of Campeonato Nacional de Liga de Primera División football matches.
- 1 July: TV channel Factoria de Ficcion stops broadcasting.
- 31 July: TV channel Hogar 10 starts broadcasting.
- September: Canal Club later called La Tienda en Casa is officially launched.
- 5 November: Break-up of comic duo Cruz y raya.

== Debuts ==
Title	Channel	Debut	Performers/Host / Intérprete	Genre
360 grados	Antena 3	2007-09-18	Roberto Arce	Talk Show
A 3 bandas	Antena 3	2007-09-03	Jaime Cantizano	Variety Show
Al pie de la letra	Antena 3	2007-12-25	Javier Estrada	Music
Los Algos	Cuatro	2007-07-13		Children
Anónimos	La Sexta	2007-01-27	Àngel Llàcer	Comedy
El blog de Cayetana	La 2	2007-09-20	Cayetana Guillén Cuervo	Variety Show
Brainiac	Cuatro	2007-04-14	Manuela Velasco	Science/Culture
Cafetería Manhattan	Antena 3	2007-03-12	Santi Rodríguez	Sitcom
Cámara abierta 2.0	La 2	2007-11-12	Daniel Seseña	Science/Culture
Cambio radical	Antena 3	2007-03-25	Teresa Viejo	Reality Show
Círculo rojo	Antena 3	2007-05-07	María Adánez	Drama Series
C.L.A. No somos ángeles	Antena 3	2007-08-20	Héctor Colomé	Drama Series
¡Clever!	Telecinco	2007-10-28	Emma García	Quiz Show
Club de fútbol	La 2	2007-08-26	Josep Pedrerol	Sports
Cocina con Bruno	LaSexta	2007-01-08	Bruno Oteiza	Cooking Show
Como el perro y el gato	La 1	2007-05-11	Arturo Fernández	Sitcom
Confidencial S.A.	Antena 3	2007-10-22	Santi Acosta	Investigation
Cuenta atrás	Cuatro	2007-05-08	Dani Martín	Drama Series
Cuestión de sexo	Cuatro	2007-09-25	Guillermo Toledo	Sitcom
Desafío extremo	Cuatro	2007-12-29	Jesús Calleja	Documentary
Desaparecida	La 1	2007-09-05	Carlos Hipólito	Drama Series
Desnudas	Cuatro	2007-04-20	Juanjo Oliva	Reality Show
El despate	Antena 3	2007-06-25	Guillermo Martín	Quiz Show
Diario y medio	Antena 3	2007-10-19	Juan y Medio	Talk show
Díselo a Jordi	Telecinco	2007-02-24	Jordi González	Talk show
Distracción fatal	Antena 3	2007-02-19	Anabel Alonso	Quiz Show
Dutifrí	Telecinco	2007-05-06	Javier Sardá	Documentary
Escenas de matrimonio	Telecinco	2007-08-01	Marisa Porcel	Sitcom
Esta casa era una ruina	Antena 3	2007-10-05	Jorge Fernández	Reality show
Está pasando	Telecinco	2007-07-09	Emilio Pineda	Variety Show
Factor X	Cuatro	2007-05-13	Nuria Roca	Talent show
La familia Mata	Antena 3	2007-09-17	Elena Ballesteros	Sitcom
Fenómenos	La Sexta	2007-04-18	Eva González	Comedy
Gente de mente	Cuatro	2007-02-13	Antonio Garrido	Quiz Show
Gominolas	Cuatro	2007-11-06	Arturo Valls	Sitcom
El gong show	La 1	2007-06-07	Paz Padilla	Quiz Show
GPS. Testigo directo	Antena 3	2007-10-25		Investigation
Gran Slam	Cuatro	2007-02-03	Nuria Roca	Game Show
Hay que vivir	La 1	2007-07-18	Almudena Ariza	Reality Show
Herederos	La 1	2007-09-25	Concha Velasco	Drama Series
Hermanos y detectives	Telecinco	2007-09-04	Diego Martín	Sitcom
Hormigas blancas	Telecinco	2007-01-15	Jorge Javier Vázquez	
Identity	La 1	2007-07-16	Antonio Garrido	Quiz Show
Impacto total	Antena 3	2007-11-25	Ximo Rovira	Videos
Informe Robinson	Canal+ 1	2007-10-27	Michael Robinson	Sports
El internado	Antena 3	2007-05-24	Luis Merlo	Drama Series
Jeopardy	Antena 3	2007-08-27	Carlos Sobera	Quiz Show
La que se avecina	Telecinco	2007-04-22	José Luis Gil	Sitcom
El laberinto de la memoria	Telecinco	2007-10-16	María Teresa Campos	Documentary
Locos por la tele	Antena 3	2007-08-30	Mónica Martínez	Videos
Los más buscados	Antena 3	2007-01-29	Albert Castillón	Reality Show
Minuto y resultado	La Sexta	2007-03-04	Patxi Alonso	Sports
MIR	Telecinco	2007-01-10	Amparo Larrañaga	Drama Series
Misión Eurovisión	La 1	2007-01-09	Paula Vázquez	Music
Money, money	Cuatro	2007-02-05	Josep Lobató	Quiz Show
Morancos 007	La 1	2007-01-05	Los Morancos	Comedy
Muchachada Nui	La 2	2007-09-17	Joaquín Reyes	Comedy
Nadie es perfecto	Telecinco	2007-07-05	Jesús Vázquez	Quiz Show
El negociador	La 1	2007-07-16	Javier Capitán	Quiz Show
No disparen al pianista	La 2	2007-12-06	Ruth Jiménez	Music
No me digas que no te gusta el fútbol	La Sexta	2007-03-04	Juan Manuel López Iturriaga	Sports
La noche americana	Cuatro	2007-02-02	Juan Carlos Ortega	Late Night
La noche de Quintero	La 1	2007-01-25	Jesús Quintero	Talk Show
La Noria	Telecinco	2007-08-25	Jordi González	Variety Show
El ojo público del ciudadano	La 1	2007-06-21	Juan Ramón Lucas	Science/Culture
Página dos	La 2	2007-11-04	Óscar López	Cultural
Paranoia nacional	Antena 3	2007-05-05	Juan y Medio	Comedy
Ponte verde	Cuatro	2007-12-05	Raquel Sánchez Silva	Science/Culture
Por fin has llegado	La 1	2007-09-16	Josema Yuste	Comedy
La primera vez	Antena 3	2007-07-12		Videos
Puntodoc	Antena 3	2007-11-21	Luján Argüelles	Investigation
Quart	Antena 3	2007-09-04	Roberto Enríquez	Drama Series
Repor	La 1	2007-12-04		Investigation
El rey de la comedia	La 1	2007-10-27	Edu Soto	Comedy
RIS Científica	Telecinco	2007-09-23	José Coronado	Drama Series
¿Sabes más que un niño de primaria?	Antena 3	2007-06-28	Ramón García	Comedy
Sabías a lo que venías	La Sexta	2007-04-09	Santiago Segura	Late Night
Sabor de hogar	La Sexta	2007-01-08	Antxine Olano	Variety Show
El sexómetro	Cuatro	2007-12-21	Nuria Roca	Science/Culture
Si yo fuera tú	Antena 3	2007-07-04	Aitor Trigos	Talk Show
El síndrome de Ulises	Antena 3	2007-10-09	Miguel Ángel Muñoz	Sitcom
SOS adolescentes	Cuatro	2007-02-09	Ana Isabel Sanz Marín	Docureality
Soy lo que como	Cuatro	2007-01-12	Raquel Sánchez Silva	Science/Culture
Supernova	Antena 3	2007-11-12	Omar Suárez	Quiz Show
La tarde con María	Canal Sur	2007-06-25	María del Monte	Variety Show
La tele de tu vida	La 1	2007-01-11	Jesús Hermida	Videos
Tengo una pregunta para usted	La 1	2007-03-27	Lorenzo Milá	Talk Show
Tres en raya	La Sexta	2007-01-08	Carolina Ferre	Quiz Show
Tres14	La 2	2007-12-16	Luis Quevedo	Science/Culture
Unan1mous	Antena 3	2007-01-17	Ximo Rovira	Reality Show
El ventilador	Telecinco	2007-11-06	Yolanda Flores	Gossip Show
La ventana indiscreta	La Sexta	2007-07-07	Pilar Rubio	Videos
Videos por un tubo	Antena 3	2007-08-02		Videos

=== Especiales ===
- TVE
  - Ciudadano Kien

== Television shows ==
- La 1
  - Telediario (1957– )
  - Informe Semanal (1973– )
  - Parlamento (1978–2014)
  - Corazón, Corazón (1993–2010)
  - Cartelera (1994–2009)
  - Los Desayunos de TVE (1994–2020)
  - Cine de barrio (1995– )
  - Gente (1995–2011)
  - Corazón (1997– )
  - Saber vivir (1997–2009)
  - El Conciertazo (2000–2009)
  - Cuéntame cómo pasó (2001– )
  - Por la mañana (2002–2008)
  - 59 segundos (2004–2012)
  - Destino Eurovisión (2004–2013)
  - Emprendedores (2005–2008)
  - ¡Mira quién baila! (2005–2009)
  - España Directo (2005–2022)
  - Amar en tiempos revueltos (2005–2012)
  - El coro de la cárcel (2006–2008)
- Antena 3
  - Antena 3 Noticias (1990– )
  - Club Megatrix (1995–2013)
  - Espejo público (1996– )
  - El Diario de Patricia (2001–2008)
  - ¿Dónde estás, corazón? (2003–2011)
  - ¿Quién quiere ser millonario? (2005–2008)
  - Art Attack (2005–2009)
  - Los Hombres de Paco (2005–2010)
  - La ruleta de la fortuna (2006– )
- La 2
  - Al filo de lo imposble (1982– )
  - Pueblo de Dios (1982– )
  - Últimas preguntas (1983– )
  - En portada (1984– )
  - Metrópolis (1985– )
  - Documentos TV (1986– )
  - Tendido cero (1986– )
  - Días de cine (1991– )
  - La Aventura del saber (1992– )
  - Jara y sedal (1992– )
  - Zona ACB (1993–2010)
  - La 2 noticias (1994–2020)
  - La noche temática, (1995– )
  - Redes (1996–2013)
  - Agrosfera (1997– )
  - El escarabajo verde (1997– )
  - Saber y ganar (1997– )
  - En otras palabras (1997–2008)
  - La Mandrágora (1997–2009)
  - El Cine de La 2 (1998– )
  - Versión española (1998– )
  - Aquí hay trabajo (2000– )
  - España en comunidad (2000–2020)
  - Shalom (2003– )
  - Los Lunnis (2003–2010)
  - Padres en apuros (2003–2010)
  - Pocoyo (2005– )
  - Con todos los acentos (2005–2009)
  - Palabra por palabra (2005–2011)
  - Leonart (2006–2009)
- Cuatro
  - Cuarto milenio (2005– )
  - Channel nº4 (2005–2008)
  - Noche Hache (2005–2008)
  - Las noticias del guiñol (2005–2008)
  - Corta-t (2005–2009)
  - Callejeros (2005–2014)
  - Noticias Cuatro (2005–2019)
  - Nada x aquí (2006–2008)
  - Supermodelo (2006–2008)
  - Alta tensión (2006–2008)
  - El Hormiguero (2006–2011)
  - Supernanny (2006–2017)
  - Las mañanas de Cuatro (2006–2018)
- Telecinco
  - Informativos Telecinco (1990– )
  - Caiga quien caiga (1996–2008)
  - La Mirada crítica (1998–2009)
  - El comisario (1999–2009)
  - Nosolomúsica (1999–2012)
  - Survivor Spain (2000– )
  - Hospital Central (2000–2012)
  - Big Brother Spain (2000–2017)
  - Aquí hay tomate (2003–2008)
  - Los Serrano (2003–2008)
  - Bricomanía (2005–2010)
  - Decogarden (2005–2010)
  - Operación Triunfo (2005–2011)
  - ¡Allá tú! (2004–2008)
  - Birlokus klub (2004–2008)
  - Karlos Arguiñano en tu cocina (2004–2010)
  - Diario de (2004–2011)
  - Gran Hermano VIP (2004–2019)
  - El Programa de Ana Rosa (2005– )
  - Camera Café (2005–2009)
  - Aída (2005–2014)
  - Pasapalabra (2007–2019)
  - Survivor Spain (2006– )
  - El buscador de historias (2006–2009)
  - Yo soy Bea (2006–2009)
- La Sexta
  - El Intermedio (2006– )
  - La Sexta Noticias (2006– )
  - Apuesta en 20" (2006–2008)
  - Diario del Analista Catódico (2006–2008)
  - No me digas que no te gusta el fútbol (2006–2008)
  - No sabe, no contesta (2006–2008)
  - Hoy cocinas tú (2006–2009)
  - Todos ahhh 100 (2006–2009)
  - Sé lo que hicisteis... (2006–2011)

== Ending this year ==
- La 1
  - Disney Club (1990–2007)
- La 2
  - Estadio 2 (1984–2007)
  - Línea 900 (1991–2007)
  - Islam hoy (2003–2016)
  - De cerca (2004–2007)
  - Enfoque (2004–2007)
  - Estravagario (2004–2007)
  - El Rondo (2005–2007)
  - D-Calle (2006–2007)
- Antena 3
  - Homo Zapping (2003–2007)
  - 7 días, 7 noches (2003–2007)
  - La Hora de la verdad (2004–2007)
  - Buenafuente (2005–2007)
  - 1 contra 1001 (2006–2007)
  - En antena (2006–2007)
  - Manolo y Benito Corporeision (2006–2007)
  - El Precio justo (2006–2007)
- Cuatro
  - Cuatrosfera (2005–2007)
  - Surferos TV (2005–2007)
  - Todos contra el chef (2005–2007)
  - Ácaros (2006–2007)
  - Humor amarillo (2006–2007)
- Telecinco
  - A tu lado (2002–2007)
  - Estrenos de cartelera (2002–2007)
  - La casa de tu vida (2004–2007)
  - TNT (2004–2007)
  - Sábado Dolce Vita (2006–2007)
- La Sexta
  - A pelo (2006–2007)
  - La actualidad en 2D (2006–2007)
  - Bichos y Cía (2006–2007)
  - El Club de Flo (2006–2007)
  - Los irrepetibles (2006–2007)
  - Planeta Finito(2006–2007)
  - Pocholo Ibiza '06 (2006–2007)
  - Sexto sentido(2006–2007)
  - SMS: Sin Miedo a Soñar (2006–2007)
  - Traffic TV (2006–2007)

== Changes of network affiliation ==
Show	Moved From	Moved To
Pasapalabra (2000– )	Antena 3	Telecinco
Buenafuente (2005–2011)	Antena 3	La Sexta

== Foreign series debuts in Spain ==
English title	Spanish title	Original title	Channel	Country	Performers
American Dad!	Padre made in USA		Antena 3	USA	
---	Amores de mercado	Amores de mercado	Antena 3	COL	Paola Rey, Michel Brown
Boston Legal	Boston Legal		Antena 3	USA	James Spader, William Shatner
Brothers & Sisters	Cinco hermanos		Cuatro	USA	D.Annable, S.Field, C.Flockhart
Fashion House	Fashion House		Cuatro	USA	Bo Derek
Heroes	Héroes		FORTA	USA	J.Coleman, Z.Quinto, M.Ventimiglia
Jericho	Jericho		Telecinco	USA	Skeet Ulrich
John Doe	John Doe		Antena 3	USA	Dominic Purcell
Kyle XY	Kyle XY		Cuatro	USA	Matt Dallas
Life with Derek	Viviendo con Dereck		Cuatro	CAN	Michael Seater
The Lost Room	La habitación perdida		Cuatro	USA	Peter Krause, Julianna Margulies
Masters of Horror	Maestros del terror		Cuatro	USA	
Mother Moon	Madre Luna	Madre Luna	Antena 3	COL USA	Amparo Grisales
Nightmares & Dreamscapes	Pesadillas de Stephen King		Cuatro	USA	
Point Pleasant	Point pleasat		Antena 3	USA	Elisabeth Harnois, Grant Show
---	Premoniciones	David Nolande	Cuatro	FRA	Frédéric Diefenthal
Shark	Shark		La Sexta	USA	James Woods
Shinzo	Shinzo	Mushrambo	Antena 3	JAP	
Six Degrees	Seis grados		Cuatro	USA	Jay Hernandez
Sweet Secret	Dame chocolate	Dame chocolate	Antena 3	USA	Carlos Ponce
The Sword and the Rose	El Zorro, la espada y la rosa	El Zorro, la espada y la rosa	Antena 3	USA	Christian Meier
Supernatural	Sobrenatural		La 1	USA	Jared Padalecki
Torchwood	Torchwood		Cuatro	UK	John Barrowman
The Unit	The Unit		La Sexta	USA	Dennis Haysbert
What About Brian	¿Qué hacemos con Brian?		La Sexta	USA	Barry Watson
Wunschpunsch	El ponche de los deseos	Wunschpunsch	Antena 3	FRA CAN	

== Deaths ==
- 31 January – Trinidad Rugero, 69, actress.
- 6 March – José Luis Coll, 75, comedian & host.
- June – Eva Gloria, 55, hostess.
- 19 June – El Fary, 69, singer & actor.
- 25 June – Pedro Amalio López, 78, director.
- 11 July – Félix Acaso, 88, voice actor.
- 21 July – Jesús de Polanco, 77, CEO of Digital +.
- 27 August – Emma Penella, 77, actress.
- 2 October – Carmen Rossi, 75, actress.
- 21 November – Fernando Fernán Gómez, 86, actor & director.
- 27 November – Paul Loustau, 29, actor.
- 20 December – José Luis Pécker, 80, host.

== See also ==
- 2007 in Spain
- List of Spanish films of 2007
