= Canal+ Liga =

- Country: Spain
- Broadcast area: Nationwide
- Network: Movistar+

Programming
- Language(s): Spanish
- Picture format: 576p25 (SDTV 16:9); 1080i (HDTV)

Ownership
- Owner: Telefónica
- Sister channels: Canal+, Canal+ Fútbol, Canal+ Deportes, Canal+ Golf, Canal+ Acción, Canal+ Comedia, Canal+ DCine

History
- Launched: 29 August 2009; 15 years ago
- Closed: 22 August 2016; 8 years ago

Links
- Website: www.plus.es

Canal+ Liga was a Spanish private television channel, included in the payment platform Movistar+, owned by Telefónica. The channel is dedicated exclusively to football, particularly to La Liga. This channel also has a high definition signal called Canal+ Liga HD.

The channel was born on 29 August 2009 as direct competition against Gol Televisión, owned by Mediapro, with whom Canal+ Liga shares certain international football competitions' rights. The channel ceased on 22 August 2016, after Mediapro gained the TV-rights for the next three La Liga seasons and launched Bein LaLiga in association with Al-Jazeera.

== History ==
In July 2009 it surfaced the Mediapro's business strategies, who would launch a TDT Premium channel at a cost of 18 euros per month called Gol Televisión, and it would broadcast La Liga, Liga Adelante, international football competitions and UEFA Champions League. Given this, Digital+ bought the rights to other international football competitions and created Canal+ Liga. The contract price is 15 euros per month, which forced the competition to lower their rates.

The first program broadcast by Canal+ Liga was El día del fútbol (English: The football matchday). The first match broadcast was the matchday 1 in Liga Adelante, the match between Real Unión and Recreativo Huelva.

On 2010, Digital+ reorganized the programming of their channels, leaving Spanish football and UEFA Europa League in exclusive as unique content of Canal+ Liga, leaving the international football to its sister channels such as Canal+ Fútbol, Sportmanía and Multideporte (former Canal+ Eventos), created in September 2010 with the intention of broadcast all that was left by the other Digital+ channels.

The channel ceased on 22 August 2016. Movistar eliminated the Canal+ brandname earlier that month. The TV-rights have gone to Bein Sports Espana which launched Bein LaLiga.

== Contents ==
Those are the Canal+ Liga contents:

Competition	Matches per matchday
(Spain) La Liga	8/10
(Spain) Copa del Rey	14/16 (R32), 6/8 (R16), 2/4 (QF)

== Canal+ Liga 2 ==
Canal+ Liga 2 was a Spanish private television channel, included in the payment platform Movistar+, owned by Telefónica. The channel was dedicated exclusively to football, particularly to Segunda División. This channel also had a high definition signal called Canal+ Liga 2 HD. This channel broadcast all the Segunda División in exclusive until 2015-2016.

== See also ==
- Canal+
- Canal+ Fútbol
- Canal+ Deportes
