= 2010–11 Valencia CF season =

Valencia
2010–11 season
- President: Manuel Llorente
- Head coach: Unai Emery
- Stadium: Mestalla
- La Liga: 3rd
- Copa del Rey: Round of 16
- UEFA Champions League: Round of 16
- Top goalscorer: League: Roberto Soldado (18); All: Roberto Soldado (25)
Home colours	Away colours	Third colours

The 2010–11 season was Valencia Club de Fútbol's 93rd in existence and the club's 24th consecutive season in the top flight of Spanish football. The season was the third season of Unai Emery in front of the team. It was also the first without goalscorer David Villa since 2004–05 who departed to join FC Barcelona in the summer of 2010.

== Current squad ==
The numbers are established according to the official website: www.valenciacf.com

Note: Flags indicate national team as defined under FIFA eligibility rules; some limited exceptions apply. Players may hold more than one non-FIFA nationality.

No.	Pos.	Nation	Player
1	GK	ESP	César Sánchez
2	DF	ESP	Bruno
3	DF	NED	Hedwiges Maduro
4	DF	ESP	David Navarro
5	MF	TUR	Mehmet Topal
6	MF	ESP	David Albelda (captain)
7	MF	ESP	Joaquín
8	MF	ARG	Alejandro Domínguez
9	FW	ESP	Roberto Soldado
10	MF	ESP	Juan Mata
11	FW	ESP	Aritz Aduriz
12	MF	URU	Nacho González
13	GK	ESP	Vicente Guaita

No.	Pos.	Nation	Player
14	MF	ESP	Vicente
15	DF	ESP	Ángel Dealbert
17	DF	LTU	Marius Stankevičius
18	FW	BRA	Jonas
19	MF	ESP	Pablo Hernández
20	DF	POR	Ricardo Costa
21	MF	ARG	Éver Banega
22	DF	FRA	Jérémy Mathieu
23	DF	POR	Miguel
24	MF	ARG	Tino Costa
25	GK	ESP	Miguel Ángel Moyà
28	MF	ESP	Jordi Alba

The following players are registered with the B team but are able to take part in First team matches. Note: Flags indicate national team as defined under FIFA eligibility rules; some limited exceptions apply. Players may hold more than one non-FIFA nationality.

No.	Pos.	Nation	Player
27	FW	ESP	Paco Alcácer
29	FW	ESP	Isco
26	MF	ESP	Iván Rubio
30	DF	ESP	Joel Johnson

=== Out on loan ===
Note: Flags indicate national team as defined under FIFA eligibility rules; some limited exceptions apply. Players may hold more than one non-FIFA nationality.

No.	Pos.	Nation	Player
—	GK	BRA	Renan (at Internacional)
—	DF	ESP	Asier del Horno (at Levante)
—	DF	FRA	Adil Rami (at Lille)
—	MF	ESP	Míchel (at Deportivo La Coruña)

No.	Pos.	Nation	Player
—	MF	POR	Manuel Fernandes (at Beşiktaş)
—	MF	ESP	Aarón (at Recreativo)
—	MF	FRA	Sofiane Feghouli (at Almería)
—	MF	NGA	Sunday (at Numancia)

=== Players in / out ===
==== In ====
No.	Pos.	Nat.	Name	Age	EU	Moving from	Type	Transfer window	Ends	Transfer fee	Source
5	MF	(Turkey)	Topal	24	Non-EU	Galatasaray (Turkey)	Transfer	Summer	2014	€5,000,000	Valenciacf.com
20	DF	(Portugal)	R. Costa	28	EU	VfL Wolfsburg (Germany)	Transfer	Summer	2014	Free	Valenciacf.com
12	AM	(France)	Feghouli	20	EU	Grenoble (France)	Transfer	Summer	2014	Free	Valenciacf.com
9	ST	(Spain)	Soldado	25	EU	Getafe	Transfer	Summer	2014	€10,000,000	Valenciacf.com
24	MF	(Argentina)	Tino Costa	25	Non-EU	Montpellier (France)	Transfer	Summer	2014	€6,500,000	Valenciacf.com
11	ST	(Spain)	Aduriz	29	EU	Mallorca	Transfer	Summer	2014	€4,500,000	Valenciacf.com
—	CB	(France)	Rami	25	EU	Lille (France)	Transfer	Winter	2014	€6,000,000	Marca.com
18	ST	(Brazil)	Jonas	26	Non-EU	Grêmio (Brazil)	Transfer	Winter	2015	€1,250,000	Valenciacf.com
12	MF	(Uruguay)	González	28	Non-EU	Levante	Loan return	Winter	2012	Free	Valenciacf.com

Total spending: ▼€33,250,000

==== Out ====
No.	Pos.	Nat.	Name	Age	EU	Moving to	Type	Transfer window	Transfer fee	Source
7	FW	(Spain)	Villa	28	EU	Barcelona	Transfer	Summer	€40,000,000	Valenciacf.com
8	MF	(Spain)	Baraja	34	EU		Contract ended	Summer	n/a	Valenciacf.com
9	ST	(Serbia)	Žigić	29	EU	Birmingham (England)	Transfer	Summer	€7,000,000	Valenciacf.com
30	MF	(Spain)	Míchel	21	EU	Deportivo La Coruña	Loan	Summer	Loan	Valenciacf.com
25	GK	(Brazil)	Renan	25	Non-EU	Internacional (Brazil)	Loan	Summer	Loan	Valenciacf.com
21	FW	(Spain)	Silva	24	EU	Manchester City (England)	Transfer	Summer	€33,000,000	mcfc.co.uk
5	CB	(Spain)	Marchena	31	EU	Villarreal	Transfer	Summer	€2,500,000	Valenciacf.com
—	MF	(Spain)	Aarón	21	EU	Recreativo	Loan	Summer	Loan	Valenciacf.com
11	LB	(Spain)	Del Horno	29	EU	Levante	Loan	Summer	Loan	Valenciacf.com
27	MF	(Uruguay)	González	28	Non-EU	Levante	Loan	Summer	Loan	Valenciacf.com
20	DF	(Spain)	Alexis	25	EU	Sevilla	Transfer	Summer	€5,000,000	Valenciacf.com
18	MF	(Portugal)	Manuel Fernandes	24	EU	Beşiktaş (Turkey)	Loan	Winter	Loan	MercaFutbol.com
—	DF	(France)	Rami	25	EU	Lille (France)	Loan	Winter	Loan	Valenciacf.com
—	MF	(Nigeria)	Sunday	22	Non-EU	Numancia	Loan	Winter	Loan	esFutbol.com
12	AM	(France)	Feghouli	21	EU	Almería	Loan	Winter	Loan	Valenciacf.com

Total income: ▲€87,500,000

== Club ==
=== Coaching staff ===
Position	Staff
Head coach	(Spain) Unai Emery
Assistant coach	(Spain) Juan Carlos Carcedo
Goalkeeper coach	(Spain) José Manuel Ochotorena

Last updated: 25 May 2011
Source: Valenciacf.es

== Pre-season and friendlies ==
25 July 2010 Slovenia Tour	Valencia (Spain)	2–0	(Saudi Arabia) Al-Hilal	Murska Sobota, Slovenia
18:30 CEST	Mathieu 3'; Banega (yellow card) 84'; Soldado 91'	Report; AS Report		Stadium: Stadion Fazanerija; Attendance: 500; Referee: Andrej Tratnjek (Slovenia)

28 July 2010 Slovenia Tour	NK Celje (Slovenia)	2–1	(Spain) Valencia	Celje, Slovenia
18:30 CEST	Golub (yellow card); Popovič (yellow card); Močič 36'; Brezič 45'	Report	Alexis (yellow card); Vicente 65'	Stadium: Arena Petrol; Attendance: 3,000; Referee: Želimirko Pavlovič (Slovenia)

31 July 2010 Summer of Champions	Hannover 96 (Germany)	1–2	(Spain) Valencia	Hanover, Germany
15:30 CEST	Haggui (yellow card); Pogatetz 90'	Report; AS Report	Soldado 20'; Joaquín 36'	Stadium: AWD-Arena; Attendance: 21,144; Referee: Peter Gagelmann (Germany)

1 August 2010 R. Louis-Dreyfus; Trophy	Marseille (France)	1–0	(Spain) Valencia	Marseille, France
21:00 CEST	Brandão (yellow card) 34'; Niang (yellow card) 34'; Ben Arfa 77'	Report laSexta Report	Albelda (yellow card) 50'	Stadium: Stade Vélodrome; Attendance: 30,000; Referee: Nicolas Rainville (France)
Note: Robert Louis-Dreyfus Trophy winner: Olympique Marseille

6 August 2010 England Tour	Aston Villa (England)	0–0	(Spain) Valencia	Birmingham, England
20:00 CEST		Report; AS Report	Alexis (yellow card) 40'	Stadium: Villa Park; Attendance: 19,909; Referee: Martin Atkinson (England)

7 August 2010 England Tour	Manchester City (England)	2–0	(Spain) Valencia	Manchester, England
20:00 CEST	33' Barry; 84' Jô	Report; AS Report		Stadium: City of Manchester Stadium; Attendance: 27,088; Referee: Mike Dean (England)

12 August 2010 Italia Tour; Triangular in Palermo	Valencia (Spain)	1–1 (5–4 p)	(Italy) Napoli	Palermo, Italy
20:30 CEST	T. Costa (yellow card) 26'; Soldado 4' (pen.)	Report; SD Report	Maiello 38'	Stadium: Renzo Barbera; Attendance: 15,900; Referee: Andrea Gervasoni (Italia)
	Penalties
	T. Costa (penalty scored); Soldado (penalty scored); Joaquín (penalty scored); Miguel (penalty scored); Del Horno (penalty scored)		(penalty scored) Quagliarella; (penalty scored) Zúñiga; (penalty scored) Dossena; (penalty scored) Aronica; (penalty missed) Rinaudo

12 August 2010 Italia Tour; Triangular in Palermo	Palermo (Italy)	1–0	(Spain) Valencia	Palermo, Italy
22:30 CEST	Balzaretti (yellow card) 1'; Pinilla 25'	Report; SD Report	Dealbert (yellow card) 7'	Stadium: Renzo Barbera; Attendance: 15,900; Referee: Andrea Gervasoni (Italia)
Note: U.S. Città di Palermo Triangular winner: Palermo (Points: Palermo 6 pts, Valencia 2 pts, Napoli 1 pt)

18 August 2010 Trofeu Taronja	Valencia (Spain)	2–0	(Italy) Fiorentina	Valencia, Spain
21:30 CEST	Banega (yellow card) 48'; Soldado 71'; Aduriz 75'	Report; Report; SD Report	Krøldrup (yellow card) 37'; Marchionni (yellow card) 61'; Waigo (yellow card) 82'; Avramov (yellow card) 89'	Stadium: Renzo Barbera; Attendance: 41,000; Referee: Juan Martínez Munuera (Valencian Community)
Note: Orange Trophy winner: Valencia

22 August 2010 Italia Tour	Lecce (Italy)	0–2	(Spain) Valencia	Lecce, Italy
20:30 CEST	Corvia (yellow card) 24'; Vives (yellow card) 32'	Report; Report; AS Report	Aduriz 35'; Fernandes 48'; Bruno (yellow card) 54'	Stadium: Via del Mare; Attendance: 13,966; Referee: Domenico Celi (Italia)

7 September 2010 La Liga break	Alcoyano (Spain)	0–1	(Spain) Valencia	Alcoi, Spain
20:30 CEST		Report; Marca Report	Alcácer 35'; Domínguez (yellow card); David (yellow card)	Stadium: El Collao; Attendance: 1,500; Referee: Miguel Bosch Domènech (Valencian Community)

27 May 2011 Last friendly	Alzira (Spain)	0–1	(Spain) Valencia	Alzira, Spain
20:00 CEST		Report	Mathieu (yellow card) 87'	Stadium: Estadi Luis Suñer Picó; Attendance: 2,000; Referee: Chaves Gallego (Valencian Community)

== Competitions ==
=== Overall ===
Valencia is going to be present in all major competitions: La Liga, the UEFA Champions League and the Copa del Rey.

Competition	Started round	Current position / round	Final position / round	First match	Last match
La Liga	—	—	3rd	28 August 2010	21 May 2011
Copa del Rey	Round of 32	—	Round of 16	27 October 2010	6 January 2011
UEFA Champions League	Group stage	—	Round of 16	14 September 2010	9 March 2011

Updated to match played 21 May 2011
Source: Competitions

=== La Liga ===
==== League table ====
Pos	Team	Pld	W	D	L	GF	GA	GD	Pts	Qualification or relegation
1	Barcelona (C)	38	30	6	2	95	21	+74	96	Qualification for the Champions League group stage
2	Real Madrid	38	29	5	4	102	33	+69	92	Qualification for the Champions League group stage
3	Valencia	38	21	8	9	64	44	+20	71	Qualification for the Champions League group stage
4	Villarreal	38	18	8	12	54	44	+10	62	Qualification for the Champions League play-off round
5	Sevilla	38	17	7	14	62	61	+1	58 (Note: SEV: 7 pts; ATH: 6 pts; ATM: 4 pts)	Qualification for the Europa League play-off round

Source: LFP, sportec.es, Yahoo! Sport
Rules for classification: 1st points; 2nd head-to-head points; 3rd head-to-head goal difference; 4th head-to-head goals scored; 5th goal difference; 6th number of goals scored; 7th Fair-play points
(C) Champions

==== Results summary ====
Overall								Home						Away					
Pld	W	D	L	GF	GA	GD	Pts	W	D	L	GF	GA	GD	W	D	L	GF	GA	GD
38	21	8	9	64	44	+20	71	10	5	4	34	21	+13	11	3	5	30	23	+7

Last updated: 21 May 2011.
Source: Competitive Matches

==== Results by round ====
Round	1	2	3	4	5	6	7	8	9	10	11	12	13	14	15	16	17	18	19	20	21	22	23	24	25	26	27	28	29	30	31	32	33	34	35	36	37	38
Ground	A	H	A	H	A	H	A	H	H	A	H	A	H	A	H	A	H	A	H	H	A	H	A	H	A	H	A	A	H	A	H	A	H	A	H	A	H	A
Result	W	W	W	D	W	W	L	L	D	L	W	D	W	L	D	W	W	W	W	W	D	W	W	D	W	L	W	L	L	W	W	W	L	L	W	D	D	W
Position	5	2	1	2	1	1	4	4	4	5	4	5	5	5	5	4	4	4	4	4	4	4	3	3	3	3	3	3	4	3	3	3	3	3	3	3	3	3

Updated to match(es) played on 21 May 2011. Source: Competitive Matches
A = Away; H = Home; W = Win; D = Draw; L = Loss

==== Matches ====
28 August 2010 1	Málaga	1–3	Valencia	Málaga
20:00 CEST	Silva (yellow card) 16'; Manu (yellow card) 16'; Fernández 45'	(Report) (Referee report); Live TV: Gol T / C+ Liga	9' Aduriz; (yellow card) 34' Albelda; (yellow card) 36' Banega; (yellow card) 38' Navarro; (yellow card) 43' Mata; (yellow card) 57' César; 70', 74' Joaquín	Stadium: La Rosaleda; Attendance: 23,000; Referee: César Muñiz Fernández (Asturias)

11 September 2010 2	Valencia	1–0	Racing Santander	Valencia
18:00 CEST	R. Costa (yellow card) 40'; Maduro 44'; T. Costa (yellow card) 71'; César (yellow card) 80'; Joaquín (yellow card) 86'	(Report) (Referee report); Live TV:	(yellow card) 37' Munitis; (yellow card) 39' Torrejón	Stadium: Mestalla; Attendance: 45,000; Referee: José Luis Paradas Romero (Andalusia)

19 September 2010 3	Hércules	1–2	Valencia	Alicante
17:00 CEST	Peña (yellow card) 32'; Trezeguet 43' (pen.); Drenthe (yellow card) 82'	(Report) (Referee report); Live TV:	2' Mata; 22' Hernández; (yellow card) 26' Miguel; (yellow card) 42' (yellow-red card) 49' Navarro; (yellow card) 43' T. Costa; (yellow card) 78' Joaquín; (yellow card) 89' Mathieu	Stadium: José Rico Pérez; Attendance: 20,000; Referee: Rafael Ramírez Domínguez (Andalusia)

22 September 2010 4	Valencia	1–1	Atlético Madrid	Valencia
22:00 CEST	Mathieu (yellow card) 40'; Albelda (yellow card) 44'; Maduro (yellow card) 66'; Mata (yellow card) 75'; Aduriz 82'; Alba (yellow card) 84'	(Report) (Referee report); Live TV: laSexta / C9 / TM / TV3 / / A7	18' Simão; (yellow card) 73' López; (yellow card) 81' Mérida; (yellow card) 85' Assunção; (yellow card) 88' Costa; (yellow card) 89' Suárez	Stadium: Mestalla; Attendance: 44,500; Referee: Eduardo Iturralde González (Basque Country)

25 September 2010 5	Sporting Gijón	0–2	Valencia	Gijón
18:00 CEST	Eguren (yellow card) 31'; Grégory (yellow card) 38'; Barral (yellow card) 85'	(Report) (Referee report); Live TV: Gol T / C+ Liga	7' Topal; 10', (yellow card) 52' Soldado; (yellow card) 53' Navarro	Stadium: El Molinón; Attendance: 21,000; Referee: David Fernández Borbalán (Andalusia)

2 October 2010 6	Valencia	2–1	Athletic Bilbao	Valencia
22:00 CEST	Aduriz 11'; Topal (yellow card) 48'; Soldado (yellow card) 72'; R. Costa (yellow card) 73'; Vicente 89'; Fernandes (yellow card) 89'	(Report) (Referee report); Live TV: laSexta / C9 / TM / TV3 / / A7	(yellow card) 6' Llorente; (yellow card) 69' Aurtenetxe; 90' Gabilondo	Stadium: Mestalla; Attendance: 43,500; Referee: Carlos Velasco Carballo (Community of Madrid)

16 October 2010 7	Barcelona	2–1	Valencia	Barcelona
20:00 CEST	Iniesta 46'; Keita (yellow card) 54'; Puyol 62'; Valdés (yellow card) 89'	(Report) (Referee report); Live TV: Gol T / C+ Liga	37' Hernández; (yellow card) 39' Soldado; (yellow card) 71' Albelda; (yellow card) 88' César; (yellow card) 89' Aduriz	Stadium: Camp Nou; Attendance: 87,975; Referee: Fernando Teixeira Vitienes (Cantabria)

23 October 2010 8	Valencia	1–2	Mallorca	Valencia
22:00 CEST	Albelda (yellow card) 26'; Soldado 35' (pen.), (yellow card) 76'; Banega (yellow card) 40'; R. Costa (yellow card) 58'; Aduriz (yellow card) 69'; T. Costa (yellow card) 88'	(Report) (Referee report); Live TV: laSexta / C9 / / TV3 / TM / A7	6', 28' Castro; (yellow card) 17' Ayoze; (yellow card) 18' Edson; (yellow card) 73' Crespí; (yellow card) 76' Nunes	Stadium: Mestalla; Attendance: 40,000; Referee: Alfonso Álvarez Izquierdo (Catalonia)

30 October 2010 9	Valencia	1–1	Zaragoza	Valencia
18:00 CEST	Banega (yellow card) 14'; Lanzaro 43' (o.g.); Navarro (yellow card) 53'; Aduriz (yellow card) 88'	(Report) (Referee report); Live TV: Gol T / C+ Liga	2' Lanzaro; (yellow card) 62' Contini; (red card) 68' Herrera; (yellow card) 72' Gabi; (yellow card) 88' Ponzio	Stadium: Mestalla; Attendance: 40,000; Referee: Carlos Delgado Ferreiro (Basque Country)

8 November 2010 10	Sevilla	2–0	Valencia	Seville
21:30 CET	Dabo (yellow card) 44'; Negredo 53'; Alfaro 76'	(Report) (Referee report); Live TV: laSexta / C9 / TM / TV3 / / A7	(red card) 26' Topal	Stadium: Ramón Sánchez Pizjuán; Attendance: 30,000; Referee: Eduardo Iturralde González (Basque Country)

14 November 2010 11	Valencia	2–0	Getafe	Valencia
21:00 CET	T. Costa 7'; Aduriz (yellow card) 40'; Navarro 63'; Alba (yellow card) 69'; Albelda (yellow card) 81'	(Report) (Referee report); Live TV:	(yellow card) 60' Mané; (yellow card) 89' Rafa; (yellow card) 89' Díaz	Stadium: Mestalla; Attendance: 37,000; Referee: Carlos Clos Gómez (Aragon)

20 November 2010 12	Villarreal	1–1	Valencia	Villarreal
18:00 CET	Valero (yellow card) 48'; Rossi 73'; Cazorla (yellow card) 83'; Senna (yellow card) 89'	(Report) (Referee report); Live TV: Gol T / C+ Liga	(yellow card) 14' Maduro; 20' Aduriz; (yellow card) 32' Navarro; (yellow card) 56' Banega; (yellow card) 57' (yellow-red card) 80' Stankevičius; (yellow card) 63' Bruno; (yellow card) 80' Joaquín; (yellow card) 83' T. Costa; (yellow card) 89' Dealbert	Stadium: El Madrigal; Attendance: 23,000; Referee: Javier Estrada Fernández (Catalonia)

28 November 2010 13	Valencia	2–1	Almería	Valencia
21:00 CET	Soldado 26', 62'; Bruno (yellow card) 35'; R. Costa (yellow card) 72'	(Report) (Referee report); Live TV:	(yellow card) 11' Ortiz; (yellow card) 80' Piatti; (yellow card) 87' Silva; 89' Ulloa	Stadium: Mestalla; Attendance: 35,000; Referee: Javier Turienzo Álvarez (Castile and León)

4 December 2010 14	Real Madrid	2–0	Valencia	Madrid
22:00 CET	Pepe (yellow card) 9'; Khedira (yellow card) 34'; Ronaldo 73', 87'; Granero (yellow card) 77'	(Report) (Referee report); Live TV: laSexta / TM / TV3 / / A7	(yellow card) 9' Alba; (yellow card) 9' (yellow-red card) 65' Albelda; (yellow card) 29' Bruno; (yellow card) 40' T. Costa; (yellow card) 75' Joaquín	Stadium: Santiago Bernabéu; Attendance: 80,000; Referee: Miguel Ángel Pérez Lasa (Basque Country)

13 December 2010 15	Valencia	3–3	Osasuna	Valencia
21:00 CET	Soldado 24'; Stankevičius 32', (yellow card) 85'; Aduriz 41'; Alba (yellow card) 79'	(Report) (Referee report); Live TV: Gol T /	(yellow card) 11' Nekounam; 40', (yellow card) 53' Juanfran; (yellow card) 49' Pandiani; 60' Flaño; (yellow card) 65' Monreal; 87' Aranda	Stadium: Mestalla; Attendance: 34,500; Referee: César Muñiz Fernández (Asturias)

18 December 2010 16	Real Sociedad	1–2	Valencia	San Sebastián
22:00 CET	Rivas (yellow card) 7'; Prieto 23' (pen.), (yellow card) 54'; De la Bella (yellow card) 57'	(Report) (Referee report); Live TV: laSexta / TM / TV3 / / A7	(yellow card) 22' Navarro; (yellow card) 30' Soldado; (yellow card) 81' Bruno; 45', (yellow card) 86' T. Costa; 90' Aduriz	Stadium: Anoeta; Attendance: 21,885; Referee: Ignacio Iglesias Villanueva (Galicia)

2 January 2011 17	Valencia	2–1	Espanyol	Valencia
22:00 CET	Aduriz 28', (red card) 61'; R. Costa (yellow card) 54'; Topal (yellow card) 66'; Mata 90'	(Report) (Referee report); Live TV: laSexta / TV3 / / TM / A7	(yellow card) 32' Forlín; (yellow card) 39' Vilà; 45' (o.g.) R. Costa; (yellow card) 67' Dátolo	Stadium: Mestalla; Attendance: 35,000; Referee: José Luis González González (Castile and León)

9 January 2011 18	Levante	0–1	Valencia	Valencia
21:00 CET	Ballesteros (yellow card) 44'; Juanfran (yellow card) 61'; Stuani (yellow card) 79'; Robusté (yellow card) 89'	(Report) (Referee report); Live TV:	(yellow card) 16' Aduriz; 83' Mata	Stadium: Ciutat de València; Attendance: 15,162; Referee: Carlos Clos Gómez (Aragon)

16 January 2011 19	Valencia	2–0	Deportivo La Coruña	Valencia
17:00 CET	Maduro (yellow card) 11'; Mathieu 79'; Vicente (yellow card) 82'; Hernández 89', (yellow card) 89'	(Report) (Referee report); Live TV: Gol T / C+ Liga	(yellow card) 55' Aythami; (yellow card) 61' Laure	Stadium: Mestalla; Attendance: 40,000; Referee: Alberto Undiano Mallenco (Navarre)

23 January 2011 20	Valencia	4–3	Málaga	Valencia
22:00 CET	Mata 16' (pen.); Maduro (yellow card) 33'; Soldado 53'; Banega 68'; Aduriz 88'	(Report) (Referee report); Live TV: laSexta / TV3 / TM / / A7	10', 35' Rondón; (red card) 16' Demichelis; (yellow card) 25', (goal) 79' Baptista; (yellow card) 31' Duda; (red card) 65' Rosário; (yellow card) 68' Asenjo; (yellow card) 89' Apoño	Stadium: Mestalla; Attendance: 35,000; Referee: Antonio Rubinos Pérez (Community of Madrid)

31 January 2011 21	Racing Santander	1–1	Valencia	Santander
21:00 CET	Nahuelpán 32', (yellow card) 32'; Rosenberg (yellow card) 35'; Henrique (yellow card) 60'; Lacen (yellow card) 88' (red card) 88'	(Report) (Referee report); Live TV: Gol T /	(yellow card) 52' (red card) 52' Navarro; (yellow card) 60' Stankevičius; (yellow card) 63', (goal) 77' T. Costa; (yellow card) 84' (yellow-red card) 87' R. Costa	Stadium: El Sardinero; Attendance: 16,308; Referee: Alfonso Javier Álvarez Izquierdo (Catalonia)

6 February 2011 22	Valencia	2–0	Hércules	Valencia
21:00 CET	Banega (yellow card) 25'; Navarro (yellow card) 28'; Domínguez (yellow card) 33'; Aduriz 42'; T. Costa 52'	(Report) (Referee report); Live TV:	(yellow card) 32' Rodri; (yellow card) 36' Thomert	Stadium: Mestalla; Attendance: 39,000; Referee: Fernando Teixeira Vitienes (Cantabria)

12 February 2011 23	Atlético Madrid	1–2	Valencia	Madrid
18:00 CET	Reyes 2'; Forlán (yellow card) 43'; Suárez (yellow card) 85'; Godín (red card) 85'	(Report) (Referee report); Live TV: Gol T / C+ Liga	(yellow card) 34' T. Costa; 40', 85' Joaquín; (yellow card) 57' Maduro; (yellow card) 60' Alba; (yellow card) 78' Topal	Stadium: Vicente Calderón; Attendance: 40,000; Referee: David Fernández Borbalán (Andalusia)

19 February 2011 24	Valencia	0–0	Sporting Gijón	Valencia
18:00 CET	Topal (yellow card) 55'	(Report) (Referee report); Live TV: Gol T / C+ Liga		Stadium: Mestalla; Attendance: 41,000; Referee: Carlos Clos Gómez (Aragon)

27 February 2011 25	Athletic Bilbao	1–2	Valencia	Bilbao
21:00 CET	Llorente 14', (yellow card) 75'; Muniain (yellow card) 61'; De Marcos (yellow card) 77'	(Report) (Referee report); Live TV:	(yellow card) 33' Topal; (yellow card) 57' Soldado; (yellow card) 61' Bruno; 71' Mata; 81' Jonas; (yellow card) 71' Stankevičius; (yellow card) 83' T. Costa; (yellow card) 89' Guaita	Stadium: San Mamés; Attendance: 35,000; Referee: César Muñiz Fernández (Asturias)

2 March 2011 26	Valencia	0–1	Barcelona	Valencia
22:00 CET	Alba (yellow card) 49'; Hernández (yellow card) 66'; T. Costa (yellow card) 79'; Soldado (yellow card) 89'	(Report) (Referee report); Live TV: laSexta / TV3 / TM / / A7	(yellow card) 64', (goal) 77' Messi; (yellow card) 80' Busquets	Stadium: Mestalla; Attendance: 58,000; Referee: Eduardo Iturralde González (Basque Country)

5 March 2011 27	Mallorca	1–2	Valencia	Palma
18:00 CET	Ramis 31' (pen.), (yellow card) 75'; Webó (yellow card) 73'	(Report) (Referee report); Live TV: Gol T / C+ Liga	33', 56' Hernández	Stadium: Iberostar; Attendance: 14,000; Referee: Alberto Undiano Mallenco (Navarre)

12 March 2011 28	Zaragoza	4–0	Valencia	Zaragoza
22:00 CET	Jarošík 5'; Paredes (yellow card) 27'; Herrera 40'; Gabi (yellow card) 52', (goal) 65' (pen.), 74' (pen.)	(Report) (Referee report); Live TV: laSexta / TV3 / TM / / A7	(yellow card) 42' (yellow-red card) 63' Stankevičius; (yellow card) 45' T. Costa; (yellow card) 45' Banega; (yellow card) 45' Albelda	Stadium: La Romareda; Attendance: 30,000; Referee: José Luis González González (Castile and León)

20 March 2011 29	Valencia	0–1	Sevilla	Valencia
21:00 CET	Bruno (yellow card) 48'; Joaquín (yellow card) 89'	(Report) (Referee report); Live TV:	(yellow card) 20' Alexis; 70' Rakitić	Stadium: Mestalla; Attendance: 39,500; Referee: Carlos Velasco Carballo (Community of Madrid)

2 April 2011 30	Getafe	2–4	Valencia	Getafe
20:00 CEST	Manu 13'; Díaz (yellow card) 42'; Sardinero 87'	(Report) (Referee report); Live TV: Gol T / C+ Liga	(yellow card) 17' Dealbert; 46', 64', 65', 76' Soldado; (yellow card) 77' Jonas	Stadium: Coliseum Alfonso Pérez; Attendance: 15,000; Referee: Carlos Delgado Ferreiro (Basque Country)

10 April 2011 31	Valencia	5–0	Villarreal	Valencia
21:00 CEST	Soldado 13', 74'; Hernández (yellow card) 35'; Mata 55', 72'; Banega 61'	(Report) (Referee report); Live TV:	(yellow card) 66' Musacchio; (yellow card) 83' Kiko	Stadium: Mestalla; Attendance: 45,000; Referee: César Muñiz Fernández (Asturias)

16 April 2011 32	Almería	0–3	Valencia	Almería
20:00 CEST		(Report) (Referee report); Live TV: Gol T / C+ Liga	(yellow card) 14' R. Costa; 50' Soldado; 66' Stankevičius; 80' Alba	Stadium: Mediterráneo; Attendance: 10,562; Referee: Fernando Teixeira Vitienes (Cantabria)

23 April 2011 33	Valencia	3–6	Real Madrid	Valencia
18:00 CEST	Soldado 59'; Jonas 79', (yellow card) 89'; Alba 84'	(Report) (Referee report); Live TV: Gol T / C+ Liga	22' Benzema; 30', 42', 52' Higuaín; 38', 62' Kaká	Stadium: Mestalla; Attendance: 47,500; Referee: Miguel Ángel Pérez Lasa (Basque Country)

1 May 2011 34	Osasuna	1–0	Valencia	Pamplona
21:00 CEST	Calleja (yellow card) 54'; Stankevičius 59' (o.g.); Nekounam (yellow card) 76'; Soriano (yellow card) 83'; Ricardo (yellow card) 89'	(Report) (Referee report); Live TV:	(yellow card) 54' Albelda; (yellow card) 55' Guaita; (yellow card) 80' Stankevičius; (yellow card) 86' R. Costa; (yellow card) 88' Mata; (yellow card) 89' Joaquín	Stadium: El Sadar; Attendance: 18,575; Referee: Carlos Velasco Carballo (Community of Madrid)

7 May 2011 35	Valencia	3–0	Real Sociedad	Valencia
18:00 CEST	Soldado 16', 37'; Jonas 25'; Mathieu (yellow card) 70'	(Report) (Referee report); Live TV: Gol T / C+ Liga	(yellow card) 53' De la Bella	Stadium: Mestalla; Attendance: 34,000; Referee: José Luis González González (Castile and León)

11 May 2011 36	Espanyol	2–2	Valencia	Cornellà de Llobregat
21:00 CEST	Osvaldo 18'; Amat (yellow card) 42'; Galán 76'; Fonte (yellow card) 89'	(Report) (Referee report); Live TV:	9', (yellow card) 60' Soldado; 25' Mata; (yellow card) 51' César; (yellow card) 70' Banega	Stadium: Cornellà-El Prat; Attendance: 30,000; Referee: Carlos Clos Gómez (Aragon)

15 May 2011 37	Valencia	0–0	Levante	Valencia
21:00 CEST	Mathieu (yellow card) 5'; Banega (yellow card) 25'	(Report) (Referee report); Live TV:	(yellow card) 5' Caicedo; (yellow card) 9' Iborra; (red card) 20' Xisco	Stadium: Mestalla; Attendance: 45,000; Referee: Fernando Teixeira Vitienes (Cantabria)

21 May 2011 38	Deportivo La Coruña	0–2	Valencia	A Coruña
22:00 CEST	Pérez (yellow card) 88'	(Report) (Referee report); Live TV: Gol T / C+ Liga	4', (yellow card) 80' Aduriz; (yellow card) 24' César; 89' Soldado	Stadium: Riazor; Attendance: 34,600; Referee: César Muñiz Fernández (Asturias)

=== Copa del Rey ===
==== Round of 32 ====
27 October 2010 First leg	Logroñés	0–3	Valencia	Logroño
20:00 CEST	Sáenz (yellow card) 43'	(Report) (Referee report); Live TV: C9; Gol T / C+ Liga	Banega (yellow card) 26'; Domínguez (yellow card) 27'; Aduriz 55', 60'; Albelda (yellow card) 77'; Vicente 80'	Stadium: Las Gaunas; Attendance: 9,500; Referee: Alberto Undiano Mallenco (Navarre)

11 November 2010 Second leg	Valencia	4–1 (7–1 agg.)	Logroñés	Valencia
21:00 CET	Isco 23', 42'; Vicente 33'; Feghouli 85'	(Report) (Referee report); Live TV:	Osado 2', (yellow card) 47'	Stadium: Mestalla; Attendance: 14,980; Referee: Antonio Rubinos Pérez (Community of Madrid)

==== Round of 16 ====
21 December 2010 First leg	Valencia	0–0	Villarreal	Valencia
22:00 CET	Dealbert (yellow card) 18'; Mata (yellow card) 53'	(Report) (Referee report); Live TV: Gol T / C+ Liga	Cani (yellow card) 23'; Rodríguez (yellow card) 73'; Altidore (yellow card) 81'	Stadium: Mestalla; Attendance: 20,000; Referee: Carlos Delgado Ferreiro (Basque Country)

6 January 2011 Second leg	Villarreal	4–2 (4–2 agg.)	Valencia	Villarreal
18:00 CET	Cazorla 46'; Rossi 49' (pen.), 89'; Rodríguez (yellow card) 58'; Ruben 63'; Valero (yellow card) 88'	(Report) (Referee report); Live TV: Gol T / C+ Liga	Banega 4', (yellow card) 56'; Soldado 22'; Guaita (yellow card) 35'; Stankevičius (yellow card) 48'; Joaquín (yellow card) 88' (red card) 90'	Stadium: El Madrigal; Attendance: 20,000; Referee: Rafael Ramírez Domínguez (Andalusia)

=== UEFA Champions League ===
==== Group stage ====
Pos	Team	Pld	W	D	L	GF	GA	GD	Pts	Qualification	MUN	VAL	RAN	BUR
1	(England) Manchester United	6	4	2	0	7	1	+6	14	Advance to knockout phase	—	1–1	0–0	1–0
2	(Spain) Valencia	6	3	2	1	15	4	+11	11	Advance to knockout phase	0–1	—	3–0	6–1
3	(Scotland) Rangers	6	1	3	2	3	6	−3	6	Transfer to Europa League	0–1	1–1	—	1–0
4	(Turkey) Bursaspor	6	0	1	5	2	16	−14	1		0–3	0–4	1–1	—

Source: Soccerway

14 September 2010 1	Bursaspor (Turkey)	0–4	(Spain) Valencia	Bursa, Turkey
20:45 (CEST)		Report; UEFA report Live TV: Gol T	T. Costa 16'; Aduriz 41'; Hernández 68'; Soldado 76'	Stadium: Bursa Atatürk Stadium; Attendance: 25,000; Referee: Svein Oddvar Moen (Norway)

29 September 2010 2	Valencia (Spain)	0–1	(England) Manchester United	Valencia, Spain
20:45 (CEST)	Aduriz (yellow card) 90+3'	Report; UEFA Report; Live TV: C9 / TV3 / / ATV / TM / CS / ETB 1 / TVG / TVC / CMTV / A7 / 7RM / Extremadura / CyL7	Hernández 85'	Stadium: Mestalla; Attendance: 34,946; Referee: Viktor Kassai (Hungary)

20 October 2010 3	Rangers (Scotland)	1–1	(Spain) Valencia	Glasgow, Scotland
20:45 (CEST)	Bougherra (yellow card) 29'; Edu 34', (yellow card) 66'; Weir (yellow card) 78'	Report; UEFA Report; Live TV: Gol T	Edu 46' (o.g.); Aduriz (yellow card) 59'; Mata (yellow card) 83'	Stadium: Ibrox Stadium; Attendance: 45,153; Referee: Nicola Rizzoli (Italy)

2 November 2010 4	Valencia (Spain)	3–0	(Scotland) Rangers	Valencia, Spain
20:45 (CET)	Soldado 33', 71'; Albelda (yellow card) 65'; T. Costa 90', (yellow card) 90'	Report; UEFA Report; Live TV:		Stadium: Mestalla; Attendance: 26,821; Referee: Felix Brych (Germany)

24 November 2010 5	Valencia (Spain)	6–1	(Turkey) Bursaspor	Valencia, Spain
20:45 (CET)	Mata 17' (pen.); Soldado 21', 55'; Aduriz 30'; Joaquín 37'; Albelda (yellow card) 76'; Domínguez 78'; Alba (yellow card) 90+2'	Report; UEFA Report; Live TV: Gol T	Erdoğan (yellow card) 16'; Aziz (yellow card) 56'; Batalla 69'	Stadium: Mestalla; Attendance: 31,225; Referee: Bruno Paixão (Portugal)

7 December 2010 6	Manchester United (England)	1–1	(Spain) Valencia	Manchester, England
20:45 (CET)	Anderson (yellow card) 44', (goal) 62'	Report; UEFA Report; Live TV: Gol T	Hernández 32'; Albelda (yellow card) 60'; Moyà (yellow card) 78'	Stadium: Old Trafford; Attendance: 74,513; Referee: Pedro Proença (Portugal)

==== Knockout phase ====
===== Round of 16 =====
15 February 2011 First leg	Valencia (Spain)	1–1	(Germany) Schalke 04	Valencia, Spain
20:45 CET	Soldado 17'; R. Costa (yellow card) 62'	Report; UEFA Report; Live TV:	Matip (yellow card) 16'; Raúl 64'; Schmitz (yellow card) 65' (yellow-red card) 90+3'; Neuer (yellow card) 78'; Jurado (yellow card) 80'	Stadium: Mestalla; Attendance: 42,703; Referee: Aleksei Nikolaev (Russia)

9 March 2011 Second leg	Schalke 04 (Germany)	3–1 (4–2 agg.)	(Spain) Valencia	Gelsenkirchen, Germany
20:45 CET	Kluge (yellow card) 27'; Farfán 40', 90+4', (yellow card) 74'; Escudero (yellow card) 47'; Gavranović 52'	Report; UEFA Report; Live TV: C9 / TV3 / / ATV / TM / CS / ETB 1 / TVG / TVC / CMTV / A7 / 7RM / Extremadura / CyL7 / Sat.1	R. Costa 17'; Mathieu (yellow card) 83'; Mata (yellow card) 90+3'	Stadium: Veltins-Arena; Attendance: 53,517; Referee: Jonas Eriksson (Sweden)
