= List of most-watched television broadcasts =

This article lists the television broadcasts that had the most viewers within individual countries, as measured by ratings and research agencies in those countries. The research methodology and choice of statistics varies between sources, and is explained in individual sections.

Because many events are watched simultaneously around the world and recorded programs are exported to multiple countries, it is difficult to collate reliable figures for global audiences. Those countries where reliable figures are available may use incompatible methodologies, such as the minimum age of counted viewers, and what proportion of the program must be watched when measuring the "reach" of a program, rather than its average or peak audience. Figures published by organisers and journalists are routinely exaggerated or misrepresented, claiming billions of viewers worldwide, where independent analysis suggests few if any broadcasts have reached 1 billion viewers.

Although numbers are unreliable, it is generally accepted that the most widely watched events worldwide are international sporting events such as the Summer Olympic Games, FIFA World Cup, and the Cricket World Cup with annual events such as the CMG New Year's Gala in China, Super Bowl in the U.S., the Indian Premier League in India and the UEFA Champions League finals in Europe picking up large regional audiences. Other broadcasts frequently claimed to have broken records include news events such as the 1969 Apollo 11 Moon landing, funerals of significant figures such as Michael Jackson, Diana, Princess of Wales, or Elizabeth II, and music events such as the 1985 Live Aid benefit concert, 1993 Super Bowl Halftime Show, or the CMG New Year's Gala that is recognized by Guinness World Records as the world's most watched television program.

== Australia ==
=== Most-watched broadcasts of all time (total viewers) ===
The following is David Dale's approximate ranking of the most-watched television shows of all time in Australia using data from Nielsen Corporation and OzTAM.

Rank	Show	Date	Network
1	2023 FIFA Women's World Cup semi-final, Australia vs England	2023	Seven Network, Optus Sport
2	Death and state funeral of Elizabeth II	2022	ABC, Seven Network, Nine Network, Ten Network
3	2023 FIFA Women's World Cup quarter-final, Australia vs France	2023	Seven Network, Optus Sport
4	Wedding of Prince Charles and Lady Diana Spencer	1981	ABC, Seven Network, Nine Network, Ten Network
5	2000 Summer Olympics closing ceremony	2000	Seven Network
6	2000 Summer Olympics opening ceremony	2000	Seven Network
7	Wedding of Prince William and Catherine Middleton	2011	ABC, Seven Network, Nine Network, Ten Network
8	1984 Summer Olympics opening ceremony	1984	Ten Network
9	The World of The Seekers	1968	Ten Network
10	Boxing: Lionel Rose v Alan Rudkin	1964	Seven Network

Note: the funeral of Queen Elizabeth II, the Wedding of Prince Charles and the Wedding of Prince William were all carried by all 4 major networks and are counted together.

=== Most viewed broadcasts from 2001 to 2023 (OzTAM 5 City Metro Average) ===
The following table is a list of the most viewed programs based on the OzTAM 5 City Metro Average rating system. It does not include regional numbers (40% of the population) and uses the average viewership, not the peak viewership. Also note these ratings are not comparable with ratings before 2001 due to different methodologies used after this time. Ratings changed in 2024 and only records national viewership instead of the 5 metros.

Rank	Show	Number of viewers	Ratings	Year	Network
1	2023 FIFA Women's World Cup semi-final, Australia vs England	7.13 million (Note: 6.9 million viewers watched on the Seven Network alone. The peak viewership was 11.15 million.)	—	2023	Seven Network, Optus Sport
2	Wedding of Prince William and Catherine Middleton	6.0 million	—	2011	ABC, Network 7, Network 9, Network Ten, 7Two
3	2023 FIFA Women's World Cup quarter-final, Australia vs France	4.17 million (Note: The peak viewership was 7.2 million.)	—	2023	Seven Network, Optus Sport
4	Wedding of Prince Harry and Meghan Markle	4.09 Million	—	2018	Seven Network, Nine Network, ABC, SBS, BBC UKTV, Sky News Live
5	2005 Australian Open – Men's singles final	4.043 Million	29.3	2005	Seven Network
6	MasterChef Australia (season 2) – finale challenge	4.029 Million	27.1	2010	Network Ten
7	2003 Rugby World Cup final	4.016 Million	29.7	2003	Seven Network
8	MasterChef Australia (season 1) – finale challenge	3.726 Million	25.6	2009	Network Ten
9	2006 Commonwealth Games opening ceremony	3.561 Million	25.5	2006	Nine Network
10	2005 AFL Grand Final (Sydney Swans v West Coast Eagles)	3.386 Million	24.5	2005	Network Ten

== Brazil ==
Rank	Show	Episode	Rating	Share	Date	Channel	Content	Source(s)
1	Roque Santeiro	Episode 209	96	100%	21 February 1986	TV Globo	Telenovela	
1	Selva de Pedra	Episode 152	—	100%	4 October 1972	TV Globo	Telenovela	
2	Vale Tudo	Episode 192	81	—	24 December 1988	TV Globo	Telenovela	
3	Tieta	Episode 196	78	—	27 March 1990	TV Globo	Telenovela	
4	State funeral of Ayrton Senna	Death of Ayrton Senna	75	100%	4 May 1994 5 May 1994	TV Cultura, SBT, TV Globo, Record, Manchete, TV Gazeta and Rede Bandeirantes	Motorsport	
5	1998 FIFA World Cup	Brazil vs. Netherlands (semi-final)	73	—	7 July 1998	SBT, TV Globo, Manchete and Rede Bandeirantes	Association football	
5	O Salvador da Pátria	Episode 177	73	—	2 August 1989	TV Globo	Telenovela	
6	2002 FIFA World Cup	Brazil vs. Turkey (semi-final)	71	—	26 June 2002	TV Globo	Association football	
7	América	Episode 203	68	82%	4 November 2005	TV Globo	Telenovela	
8	2002 FIFA World Cup	Germany vs. Brazil (final)	67	91%	30 June 2002	TV Globo	Association football	

== Canada ==
The two most-watched television broadcasts in Canadian history occurred during the 2010 Winter Olympics in Vancouver. For the gold medal game of the men's hockey tournament at the 2010 Winter Olympics, played between the United States and Canada, confirmed 16.6 million Canadians watched the whole game, roughly one-half of the country's entire population. A groundbreaking 26.5 million Canadians watched some part of the game, over 80 percent of the country's 34-million-person population. According to multiple sources, 13.3 million Canadians watched the games' opening ceremony, which was the previous record.

Many believed the final game of the 1972 Summit Series had up to 18 million viewers, but only 4.3 million TVs tuned in. This statistic does not represent the reality that most school children (representing the tail end of the baby-boom i.e. a large population) nationwide watched the game in gymnasiums on only one or two TVs. 10.3 million people watched the ice hockey gold medal final of the 2002 Winter Olympics.

== Chile ==
The following are the ten most watched programs from 1992 onwards, when the "people meter" system was created. The list considers the whole program and not segments of it or peaks of ratings, as usually happens with the Festival de Viña del Mar which almost yearly achieved the highest peaks of rating during its most popular nights.

Rank	Show	Rating	Date	Channel
1	Presidential Debate Ricardo Lagos - Joaquín Lavín	71,5	1999	TVN, Canal 13, Chilevision, MEGA and La Red
2	2006 FIFA World Cup qualification (CONMEBOL) Chile vs Peru	67,1	2003	TVN
3	Sebastián Piñera Message to the nation in the context of the Social Outburst	66,8	2019	TVN, Canal 13, Chilevision, MEGA and La Red
4	2006 FIFA World Cup qualification (CONMEBOL) Chile vs Argentina	63,7	2004	TVN
5	FIFA World Cup 2010: Chile vs Honduras	57,1	2010	TVN
6	Amores de Mercado final episode	56,9	2001	TVN
7	Grand Slam Cup: Marcelo Rios vs Andre Agassi	56,1	1998	Canal 13
8	2006 FIFA World Cup qualification (CONMEBOL) Chile vs Ecuador	55,6	2005	TVN
9	1999 Copa América: Chile vs Brazil	55,1	1999	Canal 13
10	Sucupira last episode	54	1996	TVN

== China ==
China Central Television claims the Spring Festival Gala has attracted more than 1 billion viewers annually, and it has been recognised by Guinness World Records as the world's most watched television program.

The CCTV's main evening news broadcast Xinwen Lianbo has an estimated daily audience of around 135 million people, and it is also one of the most expensive shows in the world per advertising spots, with its 2013 advertising slots selling for a record of 5.4 billion yuan.

The Legend of Bruce Lee (2008), based on the life of Bruce Lee, has been watched by over 400 million viewers in China, making it the most-watched Chinese television drama series of all time, as of 2017.

A Chinese boxer Zou Shiming's professional boxing debut on 6 April 2013 reportedly around 300 million viewers. Another professional boxer Qiu Xiaojun attracted around 200 million people for his fight against Ghanaian fighter Raymond Commey on 12 February 2016. An IBF world flyweight boxing title bout between John Riel Casimero and Amnat Ruenroeng, which took place in Beijing on 25 May 2016, drew over 200 million viewers and a 4.7 rating according to the official press-release (Sina Sports reported 160 million viewers and a 0.87 rating).

== Denmark ==
The following are the ten most watched programs from 1992 onwards.

Rank	Show	Viewers	Date	Channel
1	Krøniken - Episode 10	2,714,000	2004	DR1
2	Eurovision Song Contest 2001	2,667,000	2001	DR1
3	The Last Exploits of the Olsen Gang	2,658,000	1995	TV2
4	UEFA Euro 1992 semi-final: Denmark vs Netherlands	2,657,000	1992	TV2
5	UEFA Euro 1992 final: Denmark vs Germany	2,632,000	1992	TV2
6	1994 FIFA World Cup qualification: Denmark vs Spain	2,547,000	1993	DR1
7	Dansk Melodi Grand Prix 1992	2,506,000	1992	DR1
8	The Girl and the Press Photographer	2,422,000	1992	TV2
9	1998 FIFA World Cup quarter-final: Denmark vs Brazil	2,390,000	1998	DR1
10	UEFA Euro 2012 Group Stage: Denmark vs Germany	2,378,000	2012	DR1

== France ==
Rank	Event	Viewers	Share	Date	Network
1	Speech of the French President Emmanuel Macron in response to the COVID-19 pandemic	36,730,000	94.5%	13 April 2020	TF1, France 2, France 3, Canal+, M6, C8, TMC, BFMTV, CNews, LCI, franceinfo
2	Speech of the French President Emmanuel Macron in response to the COVID-19 pandemic	35,300,000	96.1%	16 March 2020	TF1, France 2, France 3, M6, C8, TMC, BFMTV, CNews, LCI, franceinfo, L'Équipe
3	Speech of the French President Emmanuel Macron in response to the COVID-19 pandemic	32,700,000	93.6%	28 October 2020	TF1, France 2, France 3, M6, C8, TMC, BFMTV, CNews, LCI, franceinfo, L'Équipe
4	2018 FIFA World Cup final: France vs Croatia	26,200,000	—N/a	15 July 2018	TF1, beIN Sports
5	Speech of the French President Emmanuel Macron in response to the COVID-19 pandemic	24,600,000	87%	12 March 2020	TF1, France 2, France 3, M6, C8, BFMTV, CNews, LCI, franceinfo, L'Equipe
6	2022 FIFA World Cup final: Argentina vs France	24,080,000	81%	18 December 2022	TF1, beIN Sports
7	1998 FIFA World Cup final: Brazil vs France	23,647,000	88.4%	12 July 1998	TF1, Canal+
8	Speech of the French President Emmanuel Macron in response to the COVID-19 pandemic	23,610,000	85.6%	14 June 2020	TF1, France 2, France 3, M6, BFMTV, CNews, LCI, franceinfo
9	2024 Summer Olympics opening ceremony	23,240,000	83.1%	26 July 2024	France 2
10	Speech of the French President Emmanuel Macron in response to the Yellow vests movement	23,000,000	81.4%	10 December 2018	TF1, France 2, M6, BFMTV, CNews, LCI, franceinfo

== Germany ==
Rank	Show	Episode	Number of viewers	Share	Date	Network
1	2014 FIFA World Cup	Germany vs Argentina (final)	34,650,000	86.3%	13 July 2014	Das Erste
2	2014 FIFA World Cup	Brazil vs Germany (semi-final)	32,570,000	87.8%	8 July 2014	ZDF
3	2010 FIFA World Cup	Germany vs Spain (semi-final)	31,100,000 ^{1, 4}	83.2%	7 July 2010	Das Erste
4	UEFA Euro 2016	Germany vs France (semi-final)	29,820,000	80.6%	7 July 2016	ZDF
5	2006 FIFA World Cup	Germany vs Italy (semi-final)	29,660,000 ^{1, 2, 3}	84.1%	4 July 2006	ZDF
6	UEFA Euro 2008	Germany vs Turkey (semi-final)	29,460,000	81.6%	25 June 2008	ZDF
7	2010 FIFA World Cup	Ghana vs. Germany (group game)	29,190,000 ^{1, 4}	79.7%	23 June 2010	Das Erste
8	1990 FIFA World Cup	West Germany vs Argentina (final)	28,660,000	87.9%	9 July 1990	Das Erste
9	UEFA Euro 1996	Germany vs Czech Republic (final)	28,440,000	76.3%	30 June 1996	ZDF
10	UEFA Euro 2016	Germany vs Italy (quarter-final)	28,320,000	79.8%	2 July 2016	Das Erste
Notes: 1. Public viewing areas were not included in these ratings.; 2. The approximated rating is about 60 to 70 million.; 3. The extra time period reached 31.31 million viewers.; 4. Summary of the 2010 FIFA World Cup ratings.; 5. Summary of the UEFA Euro 2008 ratings.; 6. "Summary of the UEFA Euro 2012 Germany vs Italy semi-final game". spiegel.de.

Note: The UEFA Euro 2008 final is missing from the list, because the lengthy trophy presentation was included into the official ratings. The game itself was watched by 28.05 million viewers.

== Italy ==
Show	Viewers	Date	Channel	Ref.(s)
Madonna in Concerto	30—35 million	1987	Rai 1	

== India ==
India measures the viewership of shows through TRP (Television Rating Point). Shows used to have higher ratings in 2000s as compared to present decade. The present shows that regularly score above or around the 3.5 mark are Kumkum Bhagya, and its spin off Kundali Bhagya along with Yeh Rishta Kya Kehlata Hai. Sometimes these shows touch 4 which is still quite low as compared to highest rated shows of the last decade. Other than that Naagin is the only show now that scores above 4.7. All of these shows are produced by the same banner (Balaji Telefilms) except Yeh Rishta Kya Kehlata Hai. Currently, Bigg Boss 13 has been the most watched show of 2020, recording an 11.3 TRP for the final and an average of 8.3 TRP on regular episodes, being the most watched reality show in India. Ironically, 2.5–3.5 TRP was considered an average in the 2000s era of classic serials. In the 2000s, the most watched show in India was Kyunki Saas Bhi Kabhi Bahu Thi (2000–2008) which garnered double digit ratings for 6 years on StarPlus. The most-watched channel for years has been StarPlus, then Zee TV with major competition from Colors. Mahabharat (1988–1990), the television adaptation of Indian epic Mahabharata, had a share of 97.8% among Indian viewers.

Aamir Khan's talk show Satyamev Jayate (2012–2014) drew an estimated audience of 600 million viewers in India. The 2016 ICC World Twenty20 cricket cup was watched by an estimated 730 million viewers in India, with India vs. Pakistan being the most widely watched live event during the tournament.

Rank	Show	TVR (million impressions)	Network
1	Ramayan (Lakshman vs Meghnad yuddha)	77	Doordarshan
2	Luv Kush (finale)	67.10	Doordarshan
3	2018 Indian Premier League final	55.6	Star Network
4	Metti Oli	50.0	Sun TV
5	Panchayat	28.2	Amazon Prime Video
6	Mahabharat	22.9	Doordarshan
7	Kyunki Saas Bhi Kabhi Bahu Thi	22.4	StarPlus
8	Jassi Jaissi Koi Nahin	9.2	Sony TV India
9	Yeh Rishta Kya Kehlata Hai	8.4	StarPlus
10	Diya Aur Baati Hum	7.7	StarPlus
11	Pavitra Rishta	7.3	Zee TV
12	Jai Hanuman	7.2	Sahara One

=== Most viewed broadcasts ===
Rank	Show	Episode	Viewership (millions)	Date	Network
1	2011 Cricket World Cup	Sri Lanka vs India (final)	340	2 April 2011	Star Sports Network
2	2015 Cricket World Cup	Australia vs India (semi-final)	309	26 March 2015	Star Sports
3	2023 Cricket World Cup	India vs Australia (final)	300	19 November 2023	Star Sports
4	2019 Cricket World Cup	India vs New Zealand (semi-final)	283	16 June 2019	Star Sports
5	2015 Cricket World Cup	India vs Pakistan (group stage match)	282	15 February 2015	Star Sports
6	2015 Cricket World Cup	India vs West Indies (group stage match)	262	16 June 2019	Star Sports
7	2015 Cricket World Cup	India vs South Africa (group stage match)	257	22 February 2015	Star Sports
8	2015 Cricket World Cup	India vs Bangladesh (quarter-final)	251	19 March 2015	Star Sports
9	2025 ICC Champions Trophy	India vs New Zealand (final)	230	9 March 2025	Star Sports
10	2025 ICC Champions Trophy	India vs Pakistan (group stage match)	206	23 February 2025	Star Sports

== Ireland ==
RTÉ Television, the state broadcaster in the Republic of Ireland, published a list in January 2015 of the 50 most-watched broadcasts in the state since 2000, all of which had been broadcast on its channels.

Top 50 television audiences in Ireland, 2000–2014
Programme	Entries in top 50	Highest		Dates
Programme	Entries in top 50	Rank	Audience (million)	Dates
The Late Late Toy Show	8	1	1.5935	2007–2014
Who Wants to Be a Millionaire?	7	7	1.2764	2000–2001
Ireland football team matches	3	8	1.2357	2009, 2012
RTÉ News: Nine O'Clock; address by Enda Kenny on austerity	1	10	1.2053	2011
Eurovision Song Contest	2	12	1.1827	2003, 2011
Love/Hate	12	14	1.1502	2013–2014
The Late Late Show (non-Toy Show episodes)	7	17	1.1216	2000–2012
The Sunday Game	4	21	1.0852	2010–2013
Mrs Brown's Boys	2	25	1.0681	2012–2013
Ireland rugby team match	1	38	1.0099	2007
Coronation Street	2	42	0.9914	2000
You're a Star	1	44	0.9898	2003

== Japan ==
The following is a list of the top 50 highest rated broadcasts of all time in Japan since Video Research started their ratings survey on December 3, 1962.

No.	Show	Household Rating	Date	Network
1	14th NHK Kōhaku Uta Gassen	81.4%	31 December 1963	NHK
2	1964 Summer Olympics - Women's Volleyball, Japan vs. Soviet Union	66.8%	23 October 1964	NHK
3	2002 FIFA World Cup - Japan vs Russia (group game)	66.1%	9 June 2002	Fuji TV
4	Professional wrestling - The Destroyer vs. Rikidōzan	64.0%	24 May 1963	NTV
5	World Bantamweight Championship - Fighting Harada x Éder Jofre	63.7%	31 May 1966	Fuji TV
6	Oshin	62.9%	12 November 1983	NHK
7	1998 FIFA World Cup - Japan vs Croatia (group game)	60.9%	20 June 1998	NHK
8	World Bantamweight Championship - Fighting Harada x Alan Rudkin	60.4%	30 November 1965	Fuji TV
9	Yoshinobu-chan Never Came Home	59.0%	5 July 1965	NHK
10	1972 Summer Olympics	58.7%	8 September 1972	NHK
11	Yukutoshi Kurutoshi	57.4%	31 December 1963	NHK
12	2010 FIFA World Cup - Japan vs Paraguay (knockout game)	57.3%	29 June 2010	TBS
13	World Bantamweight Championship - Fighting Harada x Bernardo Caraballo	57.0%	4 July 1967	Fuji TV
14	Tabiji	56.9%	9 March 1968	NHK
15	The Beatles Japan Tour	56.5%	1 July 1966	NTV
16	Ohanahan	56.4%	19 September 1966	NHK
16	2020 Summer Olympics opening ceremony	56.4%	23 July 2021	NHK
18	Arigato	56.3%	21 December 1972	TBS
19	Ashita Koso	55.5%	31 January 1969	NHK
20	Moscow State Circus broadcast	55.3%	16 July 1963	NHK
20	Miotsukushi	55.3%	5 October 1985	NHK
22	Mayuko Hitori	55.2%	10 February 1972	NHK
23	World Bantamweight Championship - Fighting Harada x Éder Jofre	54.9%	18 May 1965	Fuji TV
24	World Bantamweight Championship - Fighting Harada x José Medel	53.9%	18 May 1965	Fuji TV
25	News (Yoshinobu-chan incident)	53.6%	5 July 1965	NHK
26	World Bantamweight Championship - Fighting Harada x Lionel Rose	53.4%	27 February 1968	Fuji TV
27	Ai Yori Aoku	53.3%	8 September 1972	NHK
27	Hatoko no Umi	53.3%	22 March 1975	NHK
29	1972 Winter Olympics	53.1%	11 February 1972	NHK
30	Akō Roshi	53.0%	29 November 1964	NHK
31	2006 FIFA World Cup - Japan vs Croatia (group game)	52.7%	18 June 2006	TV Asahi
32	Final day of the 1981 Hatsu basho (Chiyonofuji Mitsugu's first victory)	52.2%	25 January 1981	NHK
33	1968 Summer Olympics	51.8%	25 October 1968	NHK
33	Kita no Kazoku	51.8%	1 March 1974	NHK
35	Professional wrestling - Toyonobori vs. The Destroyer	51.2%	26 February 1965	NTV
36	News (Asama-Sansō incident)	50.8%	28 February 1972	NHK
36	19th Japan Record Awards	50.8%	31 December 1977	TBS
36	60th Japanese High School Baseball Championship - Closing Ceremony	50.8%	20 August 1978	NHK
39	World Flyweight Championship - Horacio Accavallo vs. Katsuyoshi Takayama	50.7%	1 March 1966	Fuji TV
40	Ben Casey	50.6%	11 January 1963	TBS
40	Prime Minister Tanaka visits China	50.6%	25 September 1972	NHK
40	Final day of the 1975 Haru basho (Takanohana Kenshi's first victory)	50.6%	23 March 1975	NHK
40	Non-chan no Yume	50.6%	24 September 1988	NHK
44	Hachiji da yo! Zen'in shūgō	50.5%	7 April 1973	TBS
45	Otei-chan	50.0%	11 September 1978	NHK
45	News and weather forecast (Typhoon Judy)	50.0%	12 September 1982	NHK
45	Oshin	50.0%	17 August 1983	NHK
48	Ma-neechan	49.9%	25 September 1979	NHK
49	Yubikiri	49.8%	25 January 1973	TBS
50	Hanekomma	49.7%	30 August 1986	NHK

The following list is for Japanese anime only. The list covers broadcasts after 26 September 1977. Video Research had previously recorded an episode of the 1960s Astro Boy anime that earned a 40.3% rating.

No.	Show	Household Rating	Date	Network
1	Chibi Maruko-chan	39.9%	28 October 1990	Fuji TV
2	Sazae-san	39.4%	16 September 1979	Fuji TV
3	Dr. Slump	36.9%	16 December 1981	Fuji TV
4	Dokonjō Gaeru	34.5%	23 February 1979	NTV
5	Japanese Folklore Tales 2	33.6%	10 January 1981	TBS
6	Lupin the Third	32.5%	8 December 1978	NTV
7	Touch	31.9%	22 December 1985	Fuji TV
8	Ashita no Joe	31.6%	13 March 1980	NTV
9	Doraemon	31.2%	11 February 1983	TV Asahi
10	GeGeGe no Kitarō	29.6%	22 March 1986	Fuji TV

The following is a list of the most-watched films of all time on Nippon TV (NTV), as of June 2007.

Rank	Film	Rating	Airing date
1	Spirited Away	46.9%	2003-01-24
2	Princess Mononoke	35.1%	1999-01-22
3	Howl's Moving Castle	32.9%	2006-07-21
4	Harry Potter and the Philosopher's Stone	30.8%	2004-06-25
5	Tsuribaka Nisshi 4	28.4%	1994-02-04
6	Tsuribaka Nisshi 6	28.3%	1994-12-23
7	Tsuribaka Nisshi 2	27.7%	1995-01-13
8	Tora-san's Forbidden Love	27.6%	1996-08-09
9	Shall We Dance?	27.4%	1997-03-28
10	Tsuribaka Nisshi 5	27.1%	1994-09-16

== Mexico ==
A list of most-watched shows in the Mexico, Televisa and TV Azteca broadcasters (Liga MX Apertura and Clausura), Boxing notably person like Saúl Canelo Álvarez as a professional boxer, 1968 Summer Olympics in Mexico City, (FIFA World Cup hosts 1970, 1986, & 2026 as co-hosts within United States and Canada), some concerts like Jaguares and Maná's Unidos por La Paz at Estadio Azteca on 3 March 2001; in 2007, the last episode of La Fea Más Bella", Funeral events like Chespirito in December 2014 the creator of TV Series El Chavo and El Chapulín Colorado, and Celebration of Mexican political anniversaries in 2010 celebrate independence from Spain also called Bicentenario 2010, had an average audience of over 40 million views in Mexican Television.

== Netherlands ==
Since 2002, Stichting KijkOnderzoek is keeping track of viewership of Dutch television channels. All programs with a viewership over 7 million since the start of tracking are shown in the table below.

Rank	Show	Episode	Number of viewers	Date	Network
1	2014 FIFA World Cup	Netherlands vs Argentina (semi-final)	9,058,000	9 July 2014	NPO 1
2	2014 FIFA World Cup	Netherlands vs Mexico (round of 16)	8,738,000	29 June 2014	NPO 1
3	2010 FIFA World Cup	Netherlands vs Spain (final)	8,513,000	11 July 2010	Nederland 1
4	UEFA Euro 2004	Portugal vs Netherlands (semi-final)	8,512,000	30 June 2004	Nederland 2
5	2010 FIFA World Cup	Uruguay vs Netherlands (semi-final)	8,501,000	6 July 2010	NPO 1
6	2006 FIFA World Cup	Portugal vs Netherlands (round of 16)	8,252,000	25 June 2006	Nederland 2
7	Press Conference by Prime Minister Mark Rutte on the COVID-19 pandemic		8,179,000	13 October 2020	NPO 1, RTL 4
8	2014 FIFA World Cup	Netherlands vs Chile (group stage)	8,098,000	23 June 2014	NPO 1
9	UEFA Euro 2012	Portugal vs Netherlands (group stage)	7,993,000	17 June 2012	Nederland 1
10	UEFA Euro 2012	Netherlands vs Germany (group stage)	7,984,000	13 June 2012	Nederland 1

== New Zealand ==
In 2011, the television website Throng published a list of the 12 most-watched television broadcasts in New Zealand from 1995 to 2011. This is based on average viewership of the program, but it does not include broadcasts from before 1995 or after 2011.

The Rugby World Cup has frequently had large audiences – the 2011 Rugby World Cup final, and a semi-final, both had an average audience of over 2 million.

Rank	Show	Viewship	Date	Network
1	2011 Rugby World Cup final (NZ v France)	2,036,900	23 October 2011	TV 1, TV 3, Prime, Sky Sports, Maori Television
2	2011 Rugby World Cup semi-final (NZ v Australia)	2,024,000	16 October 2011	TV 1, TV 3, Prime, Sky Sports, Maori TV
3	2011 Rugby World Cup opening game (NZ v Tonga)	1,930,000	9 September 2011	TV 1, Prime, Sky Sports, Maori TV
4	Boxing: Lennox Lewis vs. David Tua World Title Defence	1,841,230	12 November 2000	TV 3
5	One News special – Death of Diana, Princess of Wales	1,703,310	31 August 1997	TV 1
6	2000 Summer Olympics opening ceremony	1,654,310	15 September 2000	TV 1
7	One News special – Funeral of Diana, Princess of Wales	1,649,710	6 September 1997	TV 1
8	2011 Rugby World Cup quarter-final (NZ v Argentina)	1,624,400	9 October 2011	TV 1, TV 3, Prime, Sky Sports, Maori TV
9	2003 Rugby World Cup final (England v Australia)	1,604,800	22 November 2003	TV 1
10	Martin Bashir's interview with Diana, Princess of Wales	1,516,780	21 November 1995	TV 2

== Philippines ==
=== AGB Nielsen ===
The following table shows the all-time highest rating television shows in Mega Manila as tallied by AGB Nielsen since 1992. However, ratings are from a single highest recorded episode of the show (in the case of the TV series) and it is not the average over-all ratings for the whole season or series.

Top 10 highest rated television programs in Mega Manila since 1992 (AGB Nielsen tallies)
Rank	Network	Program	Year	Rating
1	ABS-CBN	The Battle: Manny Pacquiao vs. Erik Morales	2006	83.5%
2	ABS-CBN	Rosalinda	1999	69.8%
3	ABS-CBN	Esperanza	1997	67.0%
4	ABS-CBN	Pangako Sa 'Yo	2002	64.9%
5	ABS-CBN	Meteor Garden	2003	63.8%
6	ABS-CBN	Miss Universe 1994	1994	62.5%
7	RPN	Marimar	1996	61.7%
8	ABS-CBN	María Mercedes	1996	59.7%
9	RPN	Miss Universe 1999	1999	58.4%
10	GMA	Bubble Gang	1997	57.6%

== Poland ==
List of the 10 most-watched television broadcasts since the beginning of telemetry research in Poland (since 1997) by Nielsen Media Research:

Rank	Program	Date	Channel	Number of viewers	Share
1	Funeral of Pope John Paul II	8 April 2005	TVP1, TVP2, TVP3, Polsat, TVN, TVN24 and others	Over 21,400,000	Almost 90%
2	UEFA Euro 2016: Poland vs Portugal (quarter-final)	30 June 2016	TVP1, Polsat, Polsat Sport	15,974,822	86.57%
3	UEFA Euro 2012: Poland vs Russia (group stage)	12 June 2012	TVP1, TVP Sport, TVP HD	14,683,216	81.51%
4	UEFA Euro 2016: Germany vs Poland (group stage)	16 June 2016	TVP1, Polsat, Polsat Sport	14,352,012	80.89%
5	UEFA Euro 2012: Czech Republic vs Poland (group stage)	16 June 2012	TVP1, TVP Sport, TVP HD	14,070,492	81.28%
6	FIFA World Cup 2018: Poland vs Colombia (group stage)	24 June 2018	TVP1, TVP Sport	13,631,335	75.45%
7	UEFA Euro 2012: Poland vs Greece (group stage)	8 June 2012	TVP1, TVP Sport, TVP HD	13,308,343	83.78%
8	2002 Winter Olympics: Ski Jumping Men's K120 Individual (Adam Małysz's silver medal)	13 February 2002	TVP1	13,259,612	75.15%
9	Funeral of President Lech Kaczyński and First Lady Maria Kaczyńska	18 April 2010	TVP1, TVP2, TVP Info, Polsat, Polsat News, TVN, TVN 24 and others	13,033,967	86.68%
10	UEFA Euro 2016: Ukraine vs Poland (group stage)	21 June 2016	TVP1, Polsat, Polsat Sport	12,639,308	81.67%

== Portugal ==
Rank	Show	Episode	Rating	Share	Date	Channel
1	UEFA Euro 2020	Belgium vs Portugal (round of 16)	40.2	69.9%	27 June 2021	TVI
2	UEFA Euro 2004	Portugal vs Netherlands (semi-final)	40.1	85.4%	30 June 2004	RTP1
3	UEFA Euro 2012	Portugal vs Spain (semi-final)	39.5	76.0%	27 June 2012	SIC
4	2022 FIFA World Cup	Portugal vs Switzerland (round of 16)	39.1	68.4%	6 December 2022	RTP1
5	UEFA Euro 2004	Portugal vs England (quarter-final)	39.0	85.1%	24 June 2004	RTP1
6	UEFA Euro 2016	Portugal vs Wales (semi-final)	38.4	75.4%	6 July 2016	RTP1
7	UEFA Euro 2016	Portugal vs France (final)	38.2	78.1%	10 July 2016	RTP1
8	UEFA Euro 2012	Portugal vs Netherlands (group stage match)	38.1	73.4%	17 June 2012	TVI
9	2022 FIFA World Cup	Portugal vs Uruguay (group stage match)	38	66%	28 November 2022	RTP1
10	2014 FIFA World Cup	United States vs Portugal (group stage match)	37.8	75.4%	22 June 2014	RTP1

== Serbia ==
Rank	Show	Episode	Viewers	Date	Channel	Ref.(s)
1	Eurovision Song Contest 2008	Final	4.562.000	24 May 2008	RTS 1	
2	2005–06 UEFA Champions League	Crvena Zvezda vs Milan	3.350.000	22 August 2006	RTS 1	

== South Korea ==
Viewership ratings are provided by two companies in South Korea, AGB Nielsen Media Research and TNmS. Originally Media Service Korea was the only company providing such information, and it was later acquired by Nielsen Media Research. In 1999, TNS Media Korea also began such service, and later changed its name to TNmS. AGB collects viewership data based on 2050 households, while TNmS has 2000 households with measuring devices. Drama ratings usually vary between the two companies by 2–3%.

Top 10 most-watched South Korean dramas since 1992 (AGB Nielsen tallies)
#	Drama	Channel	Viewership	Date
1	First Love	KBS2	65.8%	20 April 1997
2	Was It Love?	MBC	64.9%	24 May 1992
3	Sandglass	SBS	64.5%	6 February 1995
4	Hur Jun	MBC	63.7%	27 June 2000
5	A Sunny Place of the Young	KBS2	62.7%	12 November 1995
6	You and I	MBC	62.4%	12 April 1998
7	Son and Daughter	MBC	61.1%	21 March 1993
8	Taejo Wang Geon	KBS1	60.2%	20 May 2001
9	Eyes of Dawn	MBC	58.4%	6 February 1992
10	Dae Jang Geum	MBC	57.8%	23 March 2004

== Spain ==
This table counts broadcasts after private networks started transmission in 1990. The highest-rated broadcast from before then was an episode of Un, dos, tres... responda otra vez in 1987, which had over 20 million viewers.

=== By raw viewership ===
Rank	Show	Viewers	Share	Date	Channel
1	UEFA Euro 2012: Spain vs Portugal (penalties)	18,141,000	83.3%	27 June 2012	Telecinco
2	2026 FIFA World Cup final: Spain vs Argentina (extra time)	16,608,000	89.3%	19 July 2026	La 1, La 2 Cat, Teledeporte, DAZN
3	UEFA Euro 2012: Spain vs Portugal (extra time)	16,485,000	77.1%	27 June 2012	Telecinco
4	2026 FIFA World Cup final: Spain vs Argentina	15,706,000	87.1%	19 July 2026	La 1, La 2 Cat, Teledeporte, DAZN
5	2010 FIFA World Cup final: Netherlands vs Spain (extra time)	15,605,000	85.9%	11 July 2010	Telecinco, Canal+, Canal+ Liga
6	UEFA Euro 2012 final: Spain vs Italy	15,481,000	74.3%	1 July 2012	Telecinco
7	UEFA Euro 2008: Spain vs Italy (penalties)	15,372,000	77.5%	22 June 2008	Cuatro
8	2026 FIFA World Cup: France vs Spain	14,647,000	81.3%	14 July 2026	La 1, La 2 Cat, Teledeporte, DAZN
9	UEFA Euro 2008 final: Germany vs Spain	14,482,000	80.9%	29 June 2008	Cuatro
10	Eurovision Song Contest 2002 (voting)	14,380,000	85.2%	25 May 2002	La 1
11	UEFA Euro 2012: Croatia vs Spain	14,265,000	70.4%	18 June 2012	Telecinco
12	UEFA Euro 2008: Spain vs Italy (extra time)	14,131,000	72.1%	22 June 2008	Cuatro
13	UEFA Champions League: Barcelona vs Real Madrid	14,114,000	66.9%	16 April 2011	LaSexta, TV3, Telemadrid, TPA7, IB3, ETB 1, Televisión de Galicia, Aragón TV, CMM TV, Canal Sur, Nou (TV channel), Televisión Canaria
14	2010 FIFA World Cup: Germany vs Spain	14,007,000	81.5%	8 July 2010	Telecinco, Canal+, Canal+ Liga
15	2010 FIFA World Cup final: Netherlands vs Spain	13,933,000	77.2%	11 July 2010	Telecinco, Canal+, Canal+ Liga
16	UEFA Euro 2024 final: Spain vs England	13,587,000	78.7%	14 July 2024	La 1
17	UEFA Euro 2008 final (analysis)	13,468,000	73.2%	29 June 2008	Cuatro
18	2010 FIFA World Cup: Spain vs Honduras	13,363,000	75.7%	21 June 2010	Telecinco, Canal+, Canal+ Liga
19	UEFA Euro 2012: Spain vs Ireland	13,284,000	70.2%	14 June 2012	Telecinco
20	Election debate 2008	13,043,000	59.1%	25 February 2008	La 1, Antena 3, Telecinco, LaSexta, FORTA
21	Operación Triunfo 1: Final	12,873,000	68%	11 February 2002	La 1
22	UEFA Euro 2008: Russia vs Spain	12,870,000	72.7%	26 June 2008	Cuatro
23	2026 FIFA World Cup: Spain vs Portugal	12,794,000	75.2%	6 July 2026	La 1, La 2 Cat, Teledeporte, DAZN
24	UEFA Champions League: Barcelona vs Real Madrid	12,124,000	61.5%	9 December 2011	LaSexta, TV3, Telemadrid, TPA7, IB3, ETB 1, Televisión de Galicia, Aragón TV, CMM TV, Canal Sur, Nou (TV channel), Televisión Canaria
25	Election debate 2011	12,005,000	54.2%	7 November 2011	La 1, Antena 3, Telecinco, LaSexta, FORTA
26	Election debate 2008	11,952,000	56.3%	3 March 2008	La 1, Antena 3, Telecinco, LaSexta, FORTA
27	1994 FIFA World Cup qualification: Spain vs Denmark	11,948,000	65.6%	17 November 1993	La 1
28	Gran Hermano 1: La gran final	11,745,000	70.8%	3 May 2000	Telecinco
29	UEFA Euro 2024: France vs Spain	11,568,000	71.7%	9 July 2024	La 1
30	2010 FIFA World Cup: Chile vs Spain	11,531,000	78.8%	25 June 2010	Telecinco, Canal+, Canal+ Liga
31	Election debate 2008: Zapatero-Rajoy	11,558,000	54.5%	3 March 2008	La 1, Cuatro, LaSexta
32	Cerrado por amistad	11,527,000	62.8%	28 December 1995	Antena 3
33	UEFA Euro 2008: Spain vs Italy	11,501,000	68.8%	22 June 2008	Cuatro
34	2026 FIFA World Cup: Spain vs Belgium	11,454,000	76.5%	10 July 2026	La 1, La 2 Cat, Teledeporte, DAZN
35	2014 UEFA Champions League final	11,033,000	62.1%	24 May 2014	La 1, Canal+, TV3
36	2010 FIFA World Cup: Paraguay vs Spain	10,900,000	75.7%	3 July 2010	Telecinco, Canal+, Canal+ Liga
37	Médico de familia	10,833,000	60.0%	23 December 1997	Telecinco
38	2026 FIFA World Cup: Spain vs Austria	10,760,000	69.5%	2 July 2026	La 1, La 2 Cat, Teledeporte, DAZN
39	Debate Tele 5 (González-Aznar)	10,526,000	75.3%	31 May 1993	Telecinco
40	UEFA Euro 2012: Spain vs France	10,445,000	76.7%	23 June 2012	Telecinco
41	2010 FIFA World Cup: Spain vs Switzerland	10,331,000	76.7%	16 June 2010	Telecinco, Canal+, Canal+ Liga
42	UEFA Euro 2012: Spain vs Italy	10,152,000	60.2%	10 June 2012	Telecinco

=== By year ===
Year	Show	Viewers	Share	Date	Channel
2007	2007 UEFA Cup final: RCD Espanyol vs Sevilla (penalties)	10,170,000	50.4%	16 May 2007	Antena 3
2008	UEFA Euro 2008: Spain vs Italy (penalties)	15,372,000	77.5%	22 June 2008	Cuatro
2009	2009 UEFA Champions League final: Manchester United vs Barcelona	11,310,000	61.7%	27 May 2009	Antena 3
2010	2010 FIFA World Cup final: Spain vs Netherlands (extra time)	14,582,000	80.3%	11 July 2010	Telecinco
2011	2010–11 UEFA Champions League: Barcelona vs Real Madrid	14,114,000	66.9%	16 April 2011	La 1
2012	UEFA Euro 2012: Spain vs Portugal (penalties)	18,141,000	83.3%	27 June 2012	Telecinco
2013	2013 FIFA Confederations Cup: Spain vs Italy (penalties)	13,355,000	67.9%	27 June 2013	Telecinco
2014	2014 FIFA World Cup: Spain vs Chile (penalties)	13,229,000	67.6%	18 June 2014	Telecinco
2015	2014–15 UEFA Champions League: Atlético Madrid vs Real Madrid	8,668,000	45.4%	14 April 2015	La 1
2016	2015–16 UEFA Champions League: Real Madrid vs Atlético Madrid (penalties)	11,642,000	62.3%	28 May 2016	Antena 3
2017	2016–17 UEFA Champions League: Real Madrid vs Bayern Munich (extra time)	9,373,000	46.1%	18 April 2017	Antena 3
2018	2018 FIFA World Cup: Spain vs Russia (penalties)	14,829,000	81.1%	1 July 2018	Telecinco
2019	2018–19 Copa del Rey: Barcelona vs Real Madrid	7,315,000	35.9%	6 February 2019	La 1
2020	New Year bells with Ana Obregón and Anne Igartiburu	6,107,000	29.3%	31 December 2020	La 1
2021	UEFA Euro 2020: Italy vs Spain (penalties)	13,836,000	72.9%	6 July 2021	Telecinco
2022	2022 FIFA World Cup: Morocco vs Spain (penalties)	12,609,000	70.0%	6 December 2022	La 1
2023	2023 UEFA Nations League final: Croatia vs Spain (penalties)	7,261,000	48.4%	18 June 2023	La 1
2024	UEFA Euro 2024 final: Spain vs England (final)	14,011,000	79.1%	14 July 2024	La 1
2025	2025 UEFA Nations League final: Portugal vs Spain (penalties)	9,032,000	60.7%	8 June 2025	La 1
2026	2026 FIFA World Cup final: Spain vs Argentina (extra time)	16,608,000	89.3%	19 July 2026	La 1

=== Non-sport ===
Year	Show	Viewers	Share	Date	Channel
2008	Eurovision Song Contest: Voting	10,619,000	62.8%	24 May 2008	La 1
2009	23-F: el día mas difícil del rey	6,920,000	35.5%	12 February 2009	La 1
2010	Águila Roja	6,434,000	32.5%	4 November 2010	La 1
2011	Águila Roja	6,391,000	31.1%	24 October 2011	La 1
2012	Eurovision Song Contest: Voting	8,087,000	49.3%	26 May 2012	La 1
2013	Eurovision Song Contest: Voting	6,336,000	39.1%	18 May 2013	La 1
2014	El Príncipe	6,290,000	33.3%	6 May 2014	Telecinco
2015	7D: El Debate Decisivo	9,233,000	48.2%	7 December 2015	Antena 3, LaSexta
2016	El Príncipe	5,213,000	29.2%	20 April 2016	Telecinco
2017	New Year bells	6,344,000	34.5%	31 December 2017	La 1
2018	Eurovision Song Contest: Voting	8,111,000	51.2%	12 May 2018	La 1
2019	Cara a cara: El Debate Atresmedia	9,447,000	48.7%	23 April 2019	Antena 3, LaSexta
2020	New Year bells	6,107,000	29.3%	31 December 2020	La 1
2021	¡Feliz 2022!	6,308,000	33.7%	31 December 2021	Antena 3
2022	Eurovision Song Contest: Voting	7,942,000	61.3%	14 May 2022	La 1
2023	Cara a cara: El Debate Atresmedia	5,910,000	46.5%	10 July 2023	Antena 3, LaSexta
2024	Telediario 2	7,439,000	49.4%	20 June 2024	La 1
2025	Eurovision Song Contest: Voting	6,315,000	59.7%	17 May 2025	La 1
2026	29N: Debate cara a cara	9,985,000	69.7%	19 November 2026	La 1, La 2, Antena 3, Cuatro, Telecino, LaSexta, La Séptima, 24 horas

== Sweden ==
Statistics from Mediamätning Skandinavien

=== Most-watched programmes per year ===
Year	Programme	Date	Number of viewers (millions)	Network
1983	Eurovision Song Contest 1983	23 April	6.1	SVT1
2000	Melodifestivalen 2000	10 March	4.175	SVT2
2001	Melodifestivalen 2001	23 February	3.84	SVT1
2002	Melodifestivalen 2002	1 March	3.72	SVT1
2003	Melodifestivalen 2003	15 March	3.815	SVT1
2004	Melodifestivalen 2004	20 March	4.105	SVT1
2005	Melodifestivalen 2005	12 March	4.055	SVT1
2006	Melodifestivalen 2006	18 March	4.240	SVT1
2007	Melodifestivalen 2007	10 March	3.975	SVT1
2008	Melodifestivalen 2008	15 March	4.045	SVT1
2009	Melodifestivalen 2009	14 March	3.59	SVT1
2010	Melodifestivalen 2010	13 March	3.87	SVT1
2011	Melodifestivalen 2011	12 March	3.67	SVT1
2012	Melodifestivalen 2012	10 March	4.11	SVT1
2013	Melodifestivalen 2013	9 March	4.15	SVT1
2014	Kalle Anka och hans vänner önskar god jul	24 December	3.705	SVT1
2018	Kalle Anka och hans vänner önskar god jul	24 December	3.786	SVT1
2019	Melodifestivalen 2019	14 March	3.652	SVT1

=== Most-watched sport events per year ===
Year	Programme	Date	Number of viewers (millions)	Network
2000	UEFA Euro 2000 final (FRA–ITA)	2 July	2.34	SVT2
2001	2001 World Men's Handball Championship final (FRA–SWE)	4 February	2.635	TV4
2002	2002 European Men's Handball Championship final (SWE–GER)	3 February	3.06	TV4
2003	2003 FIFA Women's World Cup final (GER–SWE)	12 October	3.525	TV4
2004	UEFA Euro 2004 (SWE–DEN)	22 June	3.796	TV4
2005	2005 World Championships in Athletics	7 August	4.055	TV4
2006	2006 Men's Olympic Ice Hockey final (SWE–FIN)	26 February	3.52	SVT2
2007	FIS Alpine World Ski Championships 2007 – Women's slalom	16 February	2.23	SVT1
2008	UEFA Euro 2008 (GRE–SWE)	10 June	3.03	TV4
2009	2010 FIFA World Cup qualification – UEFA Group 1 (DEN–SWE)	10 October	1.805	Kanal 5
2010	2010 FIFA World Cup final (NED–ESP)	11 July	2.66	SVT1
2011	2011 IIHF World Championship final (SWE–FIN)	15 May	2.035	TV3
2012	UEFA Euro 2012 (UKR–SWE)	11 June	2.94	SVT1
2013	2013 IIHF World Championship final (SWE–SUI)	19 May	2.915	TV4
2014	2014 FIFA World Cup (GER–ARG)	13 July	2.810	TV4
2015	FIS Nordic World Ski Championships 2015	1 May	2.272	SVT1

== United States ==
Although the Apollo 11 Moon landing is considered the most watched television event in American history, Fox's telecast of Super Bowl LIX in 2025 holds the record for the largest average viewership of any live single-network U.S. television broadcast, with 127.7 million viewers. During this broadcast, the halftime show was watched by 133.5 million viewers. Super Bowl XLV's live broadcast in February 2011 helped Fox become the first television network in the United States to be watched by at least 100 million American viewers by average for a single primetime night of programming. Moreover, Super Bowl telecasts account for 22 of the most-watched television broadcasts based on overall viewership in U.S. television history. Fox's live telecast of Super Bowl LI in 2017 currently holds the largest total viewership (those who watched any part of the broadcast) in U.S. television history, with 172 million viewers.

=== Most-watched broadcasts ===
Denotes news event

Rank	Broadcast	Average viewers (millions)	Date	Network(s)
1	Apollo 11 Moon landing	125–150	July 20, 1969	multiple
2	Super Bowl LIX halftime show	133.5	February 9, 2025	Fox
3	Super Bowl XXVII halftime show	133.4	January 31, 1993	NBC
4	Super Bowl LIX	127.7	February 9, 2025	Fox
5	Super Bowl LX	125	February 8, 2026	NBC
6	Super Bowl LVIII	123.7	February 11, 2024	CBS
7	Super Bowl LVII	115.1	February 12, 2023	Fox
8	Super Bowl XLIX	114.4	February 1, 2015	NBC
9	Super Bowl LVI	112.3	February 13, 2022	NBC
10	Super Bowl XLVIII	112.2	February 2, 2014	Fox

=== Most-watched television interviews ===
Rank	Interviewee	Interviewer	Average viewers (millions)	Series	Air date	Network
1	Michael Jackson	Oprah Winfrey	62.30	"Michael Jackson Talks ... to Oprah"	February 10, 1993	ABC
2	Monica Lewinsky	Barbara Walters	48.54	20/20	March 3, 1999	ABC
3	Richard Nixon	David Frost	45.00	Nixon Talks	May 4, 1977	CBS
4	Michael Jackson and Lisa Marie Presley	Diane Sawyer	37.50	Prime Time Live	June 14, 1995	ABC
5	Bill and Hillary Clinton	Steve Kroft	34.00	60 Minutes	January 26, 1992	CBS
6	Stormy Daniels	Anderson Cooper	22.11	60 Minutes	March 25, 2018	CBS
7	Barack Obama	Matt Lauer	21.90	Today	February 1, 2009	NBC
8	Whitney Houston	Diane Sawyer	21.27	Primetime	December 4, 2002	ABC
9	John and Patsy Ramsey	Barbara Walters	19.60	20/20	March 17, 2000	ABC
