= Canal+ Sport =

Canal+ Sport may refer to:

- Canal+ Sport (France), a French television channel owned by the French Canal+ Group
- Canal+ Sport (Poland), a Polish television channel owned by Canal+ Cyfrowy
- Canal+ Sport 1 (Scandinavia), a Scandinavian television channel owned by C More Entertainment
- Canal+ Deportes, a Spanish television channel owned by Sogecable
