= Canal+ Liga de Campeones =

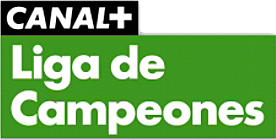
- Country: Spain
- Network: Digital+

Ownership
- Owner: Sogecable

History
- Launched: August 2012
- Closed: 1 July 2015

Links
- Website: www.plus.es

Canal+ Liga de Campeones was a Spanish television station owned and operated by Sogecable.
