= Michael Jackson Talks ... to Oprah =

- Genre: Television Interview
- Presented by: Oprah Winfrey
- Starring: Oprah Winfrey, Michael Jackson
- Country of origin: United States

Production
- Executive producers: Oprah Winfrey, Debra Di Maio, Wendy Roth
- Production location: Neverland Valley Ranch
- Running time: 90 minutes
- Production company: Harpo Productions

Original release
- Network: ABC
- Release: February 10, 1993

Michael Jackson Talks ... to Oprah is an American television interview special that was broadcast by ABC on February 10, 1993. The special featured an interview between musician Michael Jackson and Oprah Winfrey, filmed at his Neverland Ranch in California.

A.C. Nielsen reported that the interview was seen by an average of 62 million viewers, which at the time was the twentieth-largest audience for a U.S. television program recorded by the company. The interview remains the most-watched television interview in U.S. history as of 2024 with a total audience of over 90 million viewers.

== The interview ==
During the interview, Jackson denied multiple tabloid rumors surrounding his personal life, including that he had bought the bones of the Elephant Man ("Where am I gonna put some bones?"), or slept in a hyperbaric chamber.

When asked by Winfrey about his changing appearance and rumors that he had undergone cosmetic surgery, Jackson stated that the only operation he had received was a nose job, but that he had also become uncomfortable with his appearance and was afraid to look at his face in mirrors. Addressing rumors he had been bleaching his skin to lighten it, Jackson publicly revealed that he had been diagnosed with vitiligo—a depigmentation of the skin. Despite this condition, Jackson stated that he was still "proud to be a Black American. I am proud of my race. I am proud of who I am."

Reminiscing about his childhood, Jackson stated that he often missed out on hanging out with others because of his commitments to a music career. He accused his father Joe Jackson of mentally and physically abusing him.

Jackson stated that he had been dating actress Brooke Shields. When asked by Winfrey if he was a virgin, he refused to answer this, insisting that "you can call me old-fashioned if you want, but to me that's very personal."

The interview also featured a surprise appearance from Jackson's longtime close friend Elizabeth Taylor, who referred to Jackson as "highly intelligent, shrewd, intuitive, understanding, sympathetic, generous to almost a fault of himself". She also called him "the least weird man I've ever known".

== Reception ==
=== Viewership ===
A.C. Nielsen reported that the interview was seen by an average of 62 million viewers, which at the time was the twentieth-largest audience for a U.S. television program recorded by the company. The programme was broadcast in the United Kingdom on 15 February 1993 on BBC2 to 11 million viewers.

The special, along with his recent appearances at the 1993 American Music Awards, and the Super Bowl XXVII halftime show just days earlier, were contributing factors in a resurgence in sales for his 1991 album Dangerous. After a further spike following an appearance at the Grammy Awards to accept the Grammy Legend Award, Dangerous re-entered the top 10 of the US Billboard 200.
