= Movistar Fútbol =

- Country: Spain
- Broadcast area: Spain
- Network: Movistar+
- Headquarters: Madrid, Spain

Programming
- Language(s): Spanish
- Picture format: 576p25 (SDTV 16:9); 1080i (HDTV)

Ownership
- Owner: Telefónica

History
- Launched: 21 July 2003
- Closed: 12 May 2019 (cable providers); 7 August 2019 (Movistar+)
- Former names: Canal+ Fútbol (2007-2016), Canal+ Deporte 1 (2003-2007)

Links
- Website: Fútbol Movistar

Movistar Fútbol was a paid Spanish television channel owned by Telefónica, which broadcast matches from two of the five major European leagues: Serie A and Ligue 1. It was available exclusively on Movistar+, and had two other auxiliary signals (Movistar Fútbol 1-2), for matches played simultaneously.

== History ==
The channel began broadcasting on February 1, 2007, replacing "Canal + Deportes 1". The channel was dedicated exclusively to football, and began broadcasting matches of some of the major, as well as qualifying, matches for the final stages of UEFA selections. On 1 August 2016 the channel was renamed "Movistar Fútbol". The substitution of the Canal+ brand was framed within the transition in the visual identity of the channels of the Movistar+ platform.

On 9 August 2018 the channel became exclusive for the non-residential clients of the platform, as a replica of the contents broadcast by the Movistar Liga de Campeones channel for individuals. Mid-season 2018/19, on 7 March 2019, the channel returned to individuals, to cover the Ligue 1 of France and the Italian Serie A, after having acquired the rights of the same to Mediapro. Finally in mid-April 2019, the channel stopped broadcasting disappearing weeks later on IPTV and on 10 May 2019 on satellite, moving its content to #Vamos and Movistar Liga de Campeones and its auxiliary signals. Movistar Fútbol was closed officially on 7 August 2019.
