= Cine Español por Movistar Plus+ =

Spanish TV channel

- Country: Spain
- Network: Movistar Plus+

Programming
- Language(s): Spanish

Ownership
- Owner: Telefónica
- Sister channels: List of Movistar Plus+ channels

History
- Launched: 21 July 2003
- Former names: Movistar Cine Ñ (2016–2021); DCine Español (2003–2016)

Cine Español por Movistar Plus+ (formerly Movistar Cine Español) is a Spanish TV channel launched on 21 July 2003. Alongside DCine Español, it was formed DCine Studio, although it was replaced by Cinemanía Clásico one year later.

From 6 November 2009 it aired in 16:9 format permanently. Cine Español por Movistar Plus+ has a schedule exclusively about Spanish cinema, for example Curro Jiménez and La Barraca, and it is also dedicated to Spanish great actors.

== Logos ==
2016 - 2022

2022 - 2023

2023 - present
