= Marijo Moćić =

Slovenian footballer

Personal information
- Date of birth: 4 May 1989 (age 37)
- Place of birth: Celje, SFR Yugoslavia
- Height: 1.69 m (5 ft 7 in)
- Position: Midfielder

Youth career
- 2002-2006: Celje

Senior career*
Years	Team	Apps	(Gls)
2006–2014	Celje	82	(7)
2008	→ MU Šentjur (loan)	15	(3)
2009	→ MU Šentjur (loan)	4	(1)

International career^{‡}
2008–2009	Slovenia U21	4	(0)
- * Club domestic league appearances and goals as of 16 March 2014 ‡ National team caps and goals as of 3 August 2010

Marijo Moćić (born 4 May 1989) is a Slovenian football midfielder.
