= Drama por Movistar Plus+ =

- Country: Spain
- Network: Movistar Plus+

Ownership
- Owner: Telefónica
- Sister channels: List of Movistar Plus+ channels

History
- Launched: February 1, 2007
- Former names: Movistar Drama (2018–2022); Movistar DCine (2016-2018); Canal+ DCine (2007-2016)

Drama por Movistar Plus+ (formerly Movistar Drama) is a Spanish television channel own and operated by Telefónica.

== History ==
Canal+ DCine began its broadcasts on February 1, 2007, replacing Canal+ Cine 3 on the Canal+ satellite platform. Its programming is focused on the most successful and awarded movies.

Since November 6, 2009, it broadcasts in 16:9 widescreen format.

As of August 1, 2016, marking one year of the platform, it was renamed Movistar DCine, eliminating the Canal+ brand. This also brought about a new visual identity of the platform and the channel itself.

On August 30, 2018 the channel rebranded to Movistar Drama.

On January 19, 2022, Movistar+ changed its name to Movistar Plus+, a change that gave rise to a new name on its own channels and a new visual identity. The channel was renamed Drama por Movistar Plus+.
