= Comedia por Movistar Plus+ =

- Country: Spain
- Network: Movistar+

Ownership
- Owner: Telefónica
- Sister channels: List of Movistar Plus+ channels

History
- Launched: February 1, 2007
- Former names: Movistar Comedia (2016–2022); Canal+ Comedia (2007–2016)

Links
- Website: Cine en Movistar Plus+

Comedia por Movistar Plus+ (formerly known as Canal+ Comedia and Movistar Comedia) is a Spanish television channel own and operated by Telefónica. The channel's programming is based on the movies of the comedy genre.

== History ==
Canal+ Comedia began its broadcasts on February 1, 2007, replacing Canal+ Cine 2 on the Canal+ satellite platform. Its programming is focused on comedy films (youth comedy, romantic, family comedy, etc. .), complemented by comedy TV series and programs such as Saturday Night Live.

Since November 6, 2009, it broadcasts in 16:9 widescreen format.

As of August 1, 2016, marking one year of the platform, it was renamed Movistar Comedia, eliminating the Canal+ brand due to Vivendi announcing not to continue licensing the Canal+ name. This also brought about a new visual identity of the platform and the channel itself.

On January 19, 2022, Movistar+ changed its name to Movistar Plus+, a change that gave rise to a new name on its own channels and a new visual identity. The channel was renamed Comedia por Movistar Plus+.
