= Golf por Movistar Plus+ =

Spanish TV channel

- Country: Spain
- Network: Movistar+

Ownership
- Owner: Telefónica
- Sister channels: List of Movistar Plus+ channels

History
- Launched: 17 January 2002
- Former names: Movistar Golf (2016–2022); Canal+ Golf (2010–2016); Golf+ (2002–2010)

Links
- Website: movistarplus.es/golf Golf en Movistar Plus+

Golf por Movistar Plus+ is a Spanish television channel owned and operated by Telefónica. It broadcasts until 00:00 CET, and reopens in 8:00 CET.
