= Movistar Plus+ =

Spanish TV network

Movistar Plus
- Formerly: Movistar+ (2015–22); Movistar Plus+ (2022–26)
- Industry: Pay television
- Predecessor: Canal+; Movistar TV
- Founded: 8 July 2015
- Headquarters: Avenida de los Artesanos, 6; 28760 Tres Cantos, Madrid, Spain
- Area served: Spain
- Key people: Alfonso Gómez Palacio
- Products: Satellite television IPTV
- Parent: Telefónica, S.A.
- Website: Official website

Movistar Plus (formerly Movistar+ and Movistar Plus+) is the trade name of the subscription platform for digital television owned by Telefónica, which operates in Spain. The service is distributed via optical fiber and ADSL as well as with satellites such as Astra. The platform, which was officially launched on 8 July 2015, stems from the merger of Canal+, previously responsible for the satellite TV operations, and Telefónica's Movistar TV. It is the largest subscription television provider in Spain with 3.7 million customers and 45% of market share.

== History ==
Since 2013, various news regarding the possible purchase of Canal+'s Spanish assets by Telefónica were published. According to media reports, there were also many companies that expressed interest in buing the Pay-TV platform, as Al Jazeera, Vivendi, which owned Canal+ France, and Rupert Murdoch. This was critical for PRISA, owners of Canal+ Spain, as they had been looking for ways to resolve the debt the company had been accumulating since 2008, due to the 2008 financial crisis, with rumors of an acquisition by Telefónica beginning to take place as early as that year.

On 6 May 2014, Telefónica submitted a binding to gain 56% PRISA had in Canal+ Spain, in exchange for paying about 725 million euros. PRISA ended up accepting the offer the following month.

On 18 June 2014, Telefónica submitted a binding offer to acquire Mediaset Spain's 22% ownership of Canal+ Spain for 295 million euros. The offer was later accepted on 4 July 2014, allowing Telefónica to obtain full control of the company.

On 22 April 2015, the CNMC gave its approval to the sale of Canal+ to Telefónica. After this, Canal+ began the process of merging with Movistar TV effective 7 July 2015, which resulted in the creation of Movistar+ the following day.

In June 2019, an over-the-top video streaming service was launched under the brand Movistar+ Lite. It features select content but not LaLiga football matches or cinema and series exclusives. The streaming offer saw a complete overhaul on 1 August 2023, now offering a larger amount of content and the majority of the linear TV channels available on the satellite and IPTV offers, making the service more similar to Sky's Now.

Over the course of 2023, Movistar Plus+ renewed its deals with all major Hollywood Studios to continue offering their content on the Spanish TV platform. All television channels in Spain from Sony Pictures Entertainment, The Walt Disney Company, Warner Bros. Discovery, Paramount Global and Comcast continued to be broadcast on Movistar Plus+. This also saw the incorporation of the studios' content directly on Movistar Plus+'s video-on-demand services, with said content coming directly from Sony's AXN Now, Warner Bros. Discovery's HBO Max and Paramount and Comcast's SkyShowtime, while Disney's content is available through the offer of subscriptions to Disney+ at a discounted price.

In January 2024, after earlier exceptional involvements in film production with While at War (2019) and Prison 77 (2022), Movistar Plus+ announced a strategy to act as co-producer of films on a sustained basis, presenting a slate of 5 initial titles set to begin production in 2024 and to be directed by Icíar Bollaín (I'm Nevenka), Rodrigo Sorogoyen (The Beloved), Alberto Rodríguez (Los Tigres), Oliver Laxe (Sirāt), and Ana Rujas (El desencanto).

On 28 January 2025, Movistar Plus+ revived the original name of the Cine por M+ channel — which was renamed Estrenos por M+— and replaced Series por M+ with a new blockbuster movie channel, Hits por M+. Likewise, Caza y Pesca became part of the platform's basic package. These changes were carried out after the departure of AMC Networks' channels from the platform, effective 1 January 2025, which prompted the operator to reorganize its offering of its own channels to compensate for the disappearance of these signals.

In 2025, Movistar Plus+ sacked Director of Fiction & Entertainment Domingo Corral, the chief responsible for the platform's move into scripted originals after joining in 2014. He was replaced by Jorge Pezzi (fiction) and Hugo Tomás (non-fiction and entertainment). This decision "stunned" the Spanish audiovisual industry and prompted a letter of support to Corral by near 150 figures of the entertainment industry. (Note: Including Agustín Almodóvar, Alauda Ruiz de Azúa, Albert Pla, Alberto Marini, Alberto Rodríguez, Alejandro Amenábar, Alex Brendemühl, Alex García, Álvaro Morte, Ana Polvorosa, Ana Rujas, Andreu Buenafuente, Antonio de la Torre, Bárbara Lennie, Berto Romero, Brays Efe, Candela Peña, Carmen Machi, Cecilia Roth, Cesc Gay, Dani de la Torre, Daniel Guzmán, Darío Grandinetti, Eduard Fernández, Emma Suárez, Ernesto Alterio, Esther García, Fernando González Molina, Fernando Guallar, Fernando Méndez-Leite, Francesc Orella, Francesco Carril, Francis Lorenzo, Greta Fernández, Hugo Silva, Icíar Bollaín, Imanol Arias, Irene Escolar, Iria del Río, Isa Campo, Isabel Peña, Isaki Lacuesta, Javier Ambrossi, Javier Bardem, Javier Calvo, Javier Cámara, Javier Gutiérrez, Javier Ruiz Caldera, José Manuel Lorenzo, Juan Diego Botto, Juan Echanove, Leiva, Leonardo Sbaraglia, Leticia Dolera, Lola Dueñas, Luis Tosar, Luis Zahera, Macarena Garcia, Manolo Solo, Mar Coll, Marcel Barrena, María León, Marta Etura, Miren Ibarguren, Mónica López, Nacho Vigalondo, Nathalie Poza, Oliver Laxe, Pablo Molinero, Paco León, Patricia López Arnaiz, Patrick Criado, Pedro Casablanc, Pedro Almodóvar, Penélope Cruz, Rafael Cobos, Raúl Arévalo, Raül Refree, Rodrigo Sorogoyen, Roger Casamajor, Sergi López, Sergio Peris-Mencheta, Verónica Sánchez, and Victoria Luengo.)

In 2026, the operator removed the '+' symbol from the brandname, simplifying the redundant 'Movistar Plus+' adopted in 2022 in communications, although the symbol was preserved on the logo.

== Football coverage ==
For the 2026–27 season in Spain, Movistar Plus offers all La Liga matches through its football subscription packages, which include both Movistar's LaLiga channels and DAZN LaLiga. Movistar's channels broadcast five matches per matchweek across 35 matchweeks and all ten matches in the remaining three, while DAZN broadcasts the other five matches in each of the 35 shared matchweeks. The standalone streaming subscription offers one La Liga match per matchweek and the entire Segunda División season.

== Channels operated by Movistar Plus ==
Generalists

- Movistar Plus+

Series

- Originales por Movistar Plus+

Movies

- Estrenos por Movistar Plus+
- Hits por Movistar Plus+
- Clásicos por Movistar Plus+
- Acción por Movistar Plus+
- Comedia por Movistar Plus+
- Drama por Movistar Plus+
- Cine Español por Movistar Plus+
- Indie por Movistar Plus+

Sports

- LaLiga por Movistar Plus+
- Liga de Campeones por Movistar Plus+
- Vamos por Movistar Plus+
- Ellas Vamos por Movistar Plus+
- Deportes por Movistar Plus+
- Golf por Movistar Plus+

Documentaries

- Documentales por Movistar Plus+
- Caza y Pesca

Defunct

- Suspense por Movistar Plus+
- Música por Movistar Plus+
- La Resistencia 24h por Movistar Plus+
- Fútbol Replay

- All channels are broadcast in HD on fiber.
- All channels but Cine Español por Movistar Plus+ and have an HD feed available on satellite.
- All channels are broadcast in SD on ADSL.
- LaLigaTV por Movistar Plus+ and Liga de Campeones por Movistar Plus+ (1 & 2) have a HDR feed on fiber for broadcasting selected La Liga and Champions League matches.
