= Deportes por Movistar Plus+ =

Spanish sports TV channel

- Country: Spain; Andorra
- Broadcast area: Nationwide
- Network: Movistar+
- Headquarters: Tres Cantos, Madrid, Spain

Programming
- Language: Spanish
- Picture format: 576i (SDTV 16:9); 1080i (HDTV)

Ownership
- Owner: Telefónica
- Sister channels: List of Movistar Plus+ channels

History
- Launched: February 1, 2007
- Former names: Movistar Deportes, Canal+ Deportes, Canal+ Deporte 2

Deportes por Movistar Plus+ is a Spanish sports television channel, owned and operated by Telefónica, dedicated exclusively to sport and oriented to broadcast mainly basketball competitions (NBA and Liga Endesa) and tennis (ATP Masters 1000 and Wimbledon). Soccer, golf and Formula 1 have their own thematic channels in the Movistar+ platform. It also has seven other auxiliary signals (Movistar Deportes 1-7) for competitions or matches played simultaneously.

== History ==
The channel began broadcasting on February 1, 2007, replacing "Canal+ Deporte 2". It also had two versions in high definition (HD), "Canal+ Deportes HD" (simulcast channel in HD version) and "Canal+ Deportes 2 HD". As of April 2, 2011, began issuing a second signal channel called Canal+ Deportes 2 focused on athletics, tennis and four US major leagues, but they don't have discussions to rename "Canal+ Deportes 1". On August 1, 2016, Movistar replaced this channel with Movistar Deportes 1 as it decided to drop the Canal+ brand. On 9 September 2018, both channels were unified in a single main channel called "Movistar Deportes", while the second channel was renamed #Vamos.
