= Canal+ (Spanish TV provider) =

Spanish satellite television provider

DTS, Distribuidora de Television Digital, S.A.
- Trade name: Canal+
- Type: Sociedad Anónima
- Industry: Satellite broadcasting
- Predecessor: Vía Digital; Canal Satélite Digital
- Founded: 21 July 2003; 23 years ago
- Defunct: 8 July 2015; 11 years ago
- Fate: Merged with Movistar TV
- Successor: Movistar+
- Headquarters: Tres Cantos, Spain
- Area served: Nationwide
- Products: Pay television
- Operating income: €80.2 million (2009)
- Parent: Telefónica, S.A.
- Website: http://www.plus.es/

Canal+ was a Spanish satellite broadcasting platform. It was previously known as Digital+ since its launch in 2003, and from 2011 it was known as Canal+, being named after its main premium channel.

Formed on 23 July 2003 as a result of the equal merger of Via Digital (owned by Telefónica) and Canal Satélite Digital (owned by Sociedad de Television Canal Plus, S.A.), it was the largest pay-TV broadcaster in Spain.

The company used to be a subdivision of Sogecable (renamed Prisa TV in 2010) with shares held by Mediaset España and Telefónica. In October 2011, Digital+ changed its name to Canal+.

== History ==
=== Merging to Vía Digital ===
In 2002 Before the creation of Digital+, there were two pay-TV companies in Spain: Vía Digital, owned by Telefónica and which operated through Hispasat, and Canal Satélite Digital, property of Sogecable, which used Astra for their services.

The economic loss of both them in the early years and Telefónica's none investment in its division motivated the fusion process between them for merging, apart from the government. The process finished on 8 May 2002. The agreement closed the acquisition of Vía Digital by Sogecable, carrying out a capital increase in 23% for Vía Digital shareholders. The resultant company would take in 2.5 million subscribers.

However, the agreement was subject to CNMC intervention. After several months of consideration, on 28 August 2002 CNMC published a report in which the organization recognized that the existence of both satellite companies was unviable, but it warned of fusion's danger to free competition, in markets like movies and sports broadcasting, as well as in pay-TV channels production.

On 13 November CNMC Defense Court sent the definitive report to the government, containing 10 conditions, including PPV's cession to cable companies, and limitations in football clubs rights contracts renewals. Days later, on 29 November, Ministers Council approved the fusion, with an increase to 34 conditions (24 more ones than CNMC requested).

These requirements did not satisfy anyone: companies involved in integration of the two companies (Sogecable, Vía Digital and Telefónica) as well as affected business because of it, such as Telecinco, Mediapark (Teuve), cable companies joined in ONO and AOC throughout Auna had brought administrative appeals before Supreme Court.

Even though, the merger followed its process and on 21 July 2003 the new resultant pay-TV company was born in Astra and Hispasat: Digital+. But business’ creation was controversial, because of cable companies and private TV channels that stated some of the conditions weren't achieved, like increasing packages prices instead of maintaining them as it should have, or not fulfilling 20% of independent production companies’ contents.

In October 2007, it began providing Canal+ România, a specialized package for Romanian immigrants, which included Pro TV International.

Digital+'s broadcasts stayed encrypted in both encryption systems used by Canal Satélite Digital and Vía Digital. The first one is SECA Mediaguard, used in the Astra satellite, currently in its second version. The second one is Nagravisión, in its third version since 4 December 2007.

=== Strategy changes ===
On 1 February 2008 Digital+ started broadcasting in high definition with Canal+ HD launch. It initially would offer repeated HD contents from Canal+, but since 9 December 2008 transmitted the same programming of Canal+ in simulcast, offering in HD all contents that were available to broadcast in this quality. Canal+ Deportes HD and Canal+ DCine HD were launched that day too.

In September 2008, Prisa published on its newspaper El País that the business had received several offers to buy its pay-TV company, as a part of a corporate reorganization Prisa planned to make. Among the business interested in buying out Digital+, there were Telefónica, Vivendi, Telecinco, British Sky Broadcasting and ONO.

On 22 July 2009 the group presented its new channel called Canal+ Liga, direct opponent to Mediapro football channel Gol Televisión and that would include the same matches as this one. Among these ones, three of them would be from Primera División, always one with Real Madrid or FC Barcelona as a player, two from Segunda División, other two from every Copa del Rey season, as well as exclusively UEFA Europa League encrypted matches. The channel launched on 29 August 2009 with a HD simulcast.

In November 2009, Telefónica acquired Digital+’s 22% with a 240 million euros payment, moreover the debt repayment Prisa owed to give to Telefónica, which was worth in 230 million. The total cost of the operation was 470 million euros. Afterwards, in December, Telecinco bought another 22%, as a part of fusion operation of this channel with Sogecable's TV channel Cuatro.

In June 2010, the telecommunications operator Jazztel stopped commercializing its own pay-per-view services on television, to focus its audiovisual offer in agreements and Internet television services. The company signed in the beginning of May an agreement with Digital+ for being able to be commercialized with its telecom offer.

=== New naming ===
On 17 October 2011 Digital+ was rebranded as Canal+. Consequently, the premium channel known as Canal+ transformed in Canal+ 1. This change also affected Festival de Series de Digital+, which would be from then Festival de Series de Canal+, and later, Canal+ Series.

=== Canal+ sale and transformation to Movistar+ ===
In 2013, even though they had previously happened during 2008, some negotiations about Canal+ sale appeared again. These ones would be more real because of the hurry banks had to solve Prisa's debt to them.

In June 2014, PRISA accepted Telefónica's offer to own Canal+. One month later, Mediaset España would sell its share to Telefónica so it could obtain the 100% of the company. As a result, PRISA and Mediaset España both sold the Canal+ TV channel, along with the rest of its shares in the Canal+ TV provider, to Telefónica.

On 8 July 2015, Telefónica launched Movistar+, a new platform as a result of the merger of Canal+ and Movistar TV which involved changes in the packages and new channels like Canal+ Estrenos, which broadcast the newest films, or Canal+ Series Xtra, which had alternative and European shows. Canal+ 1 disappeared and traditionally named Canal+ was back, although it would not contain premium programming such as premieres of movies, American cable TV series and the exclusive Sunday football match. They all would be transferred to other Canal+ family channels.

== Coverage ==
Canal+ offers its services through Astra satellites (at 19.2° east) and Hispasat (30° west).

== HbbTv ==
Canal+ is a supporter of the Hybrid Broadcast Broadband TV (HbbTV) initiative that is promoting and establishing an open European standard for hybrid set-top boxes for the reception of broadcast TV and broadband multimedia applications with a single user interface, and has run pilot HbbTV services in Spain.

== See also ==
- Groupe Canal+
