= 2012–13 Valencia CF season =

95th season in existence of Valencia CF

Valencia
2012–13 season
- President: Manuel Llorente (until 5 April 2013); Fernando Giner (acting from 5 April 2013 to 10 April 2013); Vicente Andreu (acting from 10 April 2013 to 5 June 2013)
- Head coach: Mauricio Pellegrino (until 1 December 2012); Voro (as caretaker from 1 December 2012 to 5 December 2012); Ernesto Valverde (from 3 December 2012)
- Stadium: Mestalla
- La Liga: 5th
- Copa del Rey: Quarter-finals
- UEFA Champions League: Round of 16
- Top goalscorer: League: Roberto Soldado (24); All: Roberto Soldado (30)
- Highest home attendance: 45,000 vs Barcelona (3 February 2013)
- Lowest home attendance: 8,000 vs Llagostera (28 November 2012)
- Average home league attendance: 34,899 (including Trofeu Taronja and presentation)
Home colours	Away colours	Third colours

The 2012–13 Valencia CF season was the club's 95th season in existence and its 26th consecutive season in La Liga, the top flight of Spanish football. The season marked the coaching debut of Mauricio Pellegrino, who assumed coaching of the club after the four-year tenure of Unai Emery. Pellegrino was sacked on 1 December and replaced with Ernesto Valverde. Manuel Llorente resigned after almost four years as Valencia president on 5 April 2013.

== Players ==
The numbers are established according to the official website: www.valenciacf.com

Note: Flags indicate national team as defined under FIFA eligibility rules; some limited exceptions apply. Players may hold more than one non-FIFA nationality.

No.	Pos.	Nation	Player
1	GK	BRA	Diego Alves
3	DF	FRA	Aly Cissokho
4	DF	FRA	Adil Rami
6	MF	ESP	David Albelda (captain)
7	FW	BRA	Jonas
8	MF	ALG	Sofiane Feghouli
9	FW	ESP	Roberto Soldado (vice-captain)
10	MF	ARG	Éver Banega
11	MF	ARG	Pablo Piatti
12	DF	POR	João Pereira
13	GK	ESP	Vicente Guaita (4th captain)

No.	Pos.	Nation	Player
14	DF	ESP	Antonio Barragán
15	MF	ESP	Jonathan Viera
16	FW	PAR	Nelson Valdez
17	MF	MEX	Andrés Guardado
18	DF	ESP	Víctor Ruiz
20	DF	POR	Ricardo Costa (3rd captain)
21	MF	ESP	Dani Parejo
22	DF	FRA	Jérémy Mathieu
23	MF	ESP	Sergio Canales
24	MF	ARG	Tino Costa
28	MF	ESP	Juan Bernat

=== From Valencia Mestalla ===
Note: Flags indicate national team as defined under FIFA eligibility rules; some limited exceptions apply. Players may hold more than one non-FIFA nationality.

No.	Pos.	Nation	Player
26	GK	ESP	Felipe Ramos
29	DF	ESP	Álex Quintanilla
30	DF	ESP	Carlos Delgado
31	DF	ESP	Albert Dalmau

No.	Pos.	Nation	Player
32	MF	ESP	Portu
33	DF	ESP	Salva Ruiz
36	DF	ESP	José Luis Gayà
38	MF	ESP	Mario Arqués

=== Out on loan ===
Note: Flags indicate national team as defined under FIFA eligibility rules; some limited exceptions apply. Players may hold more than one non-FIFA nationality.

No.	Pos.	Nation	Player
5	MF	ARG	Fernando Gago (at Vélez Sársfield)
—	MF	ESP	Carles Gil (at Elche)
—	FW	ESP	Paco Alcácer (at Getafe)

=== Detailed squad information ===
Num	Pos	Nat	Name	Date of birth (Age)	Place of birth	Date signed	Signed from	Contract expires	Int	Notes
Goalkeepers
1	GK	(Brazil)	Diego Alves	24 June 1985 (age 41)	Rio de Janeiro, Brazil	4 June 2011	(Spain) Almería	30 June 2015	Brazil	
13	GK	(Spain)	Vicente Guaita	18 February 1987 (age 39)	Torrent, Spain	2 October 2008 (d)	Youth system, signed from Aldaya	30 June 2015		
26	GK	(Spain)	Felipe Ramos	10 January 1988 (age 38)	Madrid, Spain	4 July 2012	(Spain) Deportivo La Coruña	30 June 2013		On loan from Deportivo; Valencia Mestalla member
Defenders
3	LB	(France)	Aly Cissokho	15 September 1987 (age 39)	Blois, France	23 August 2012	(France) Lyon	30 June 2016	France	
4	CB	(France)	Adil Rami	27 December 1985 (age 40)	Bastia, France	3 January 2011	(France) Lille	30 June 2014	France	
12	RB	(Portugal)	João Pereira	25 February 1984 (age 42)	Lisbon, Portugal	24 May 2012	(Portugal) Sporting CP	30 June 2015	Portugal	
14	RB	(Spain)	Antonio Barragán	12 June 1987 (age 39)	Pontedeume, Spain	30 August 2011	(Spain) Valladolid	30 June 2015		
18	CB	(Spain)	Víctor Ruiz	25 January 1989 (age 37)	Esplugues de Llobregat, Spain	30 August 2011	(Italy) Napoli	30 June 2016		
20	CB	(Portugal)	Ricardo Costa	27 August 1981 (age 45)	Vila Nova de Gaia, Portugal	17 May 2010	(Germany) VfL Wolfsburg	30 June 2015	Portugal	
22	LB	(France)	Jérémy Mathieu	29 October 1983 (age 42)	Luxeuil-les-Bains, France	10 June 2009	(France) Toulouse	30 June 2014	France	
29	CB	(Spain)	Álex Quintanilla	2 July 1990 (age 36)	Bilbao, Spain		Youth system, signed from (Spain) Alavés	30 June 2015		Valencia Mestalla member
30	CB	(Spain)	Carlos Delgado	22 April 1990 (age 36)	Puerto Real, Spain	2 October 2012 (d)	Youth system, signed from (Spain) Orihuela	30 June 2014		Valencia Mestalla member
31	RB	(Spain)	Albert Dalmau	16 March 1992 (age 34)	Sils, Spain		Youth system, signed from (Spain) Barcelona B	30 June 2013		Valencia Mestalla member
33	LB	(Spain)	Salva Ruiz	17 May 1995 (age 31)	Albal, Spain	28 November 2012 (d)	Youth system, since beginnings	30 June 2013		Valencia Mestalla member
36	LB	(Spain)	José Luis Gayà	25 May 1995 (age 31)	Pedreguer, Spain	30 October 2012 (d)	Youth system, signed from (Spain) Pedreguer	30 June 2018		Valencia Mestalla member
Midfielders
5	DM	(Argentina)	Fernando Gago	10 April 1986 (age 40)	Ciudadela, Argentina	19 July 2012	(Spain) Real Madrid	30 June 2016	Argentina	Out on loan at Vélez Sársfield
6	DM	(Spain)	David Albelda	1 September 1977 (age 49)	La Pobla Llarga, Spain	15 March 1998 (d)	Youth system, signed from Alzira	30 June 2013	Spain	
8	AM	(Algeria)	Sofiane Feghouli	26 December 1989 (age 36)	Levallois-Perret, France	23 May 2010	(France) Grenoble	30 June 2016	Algeria	
10	CM	(Argentina)	Éver Banega	29 June 1988 (age 38)	Rosario, Argentina	5 January 2008	(Argentina) Boca Juniors	30 June 2015	Argentina	
11	LW	(Argentina)	Pablo Piatti	31 March 1989 (age 37)	Ucacha, Argentina	6 July 2011	(Spain) Almería	30 June 2016	Argentina	
15	AM	(Spain)	Jonathan Viera	21 October 1989 (age 37)	Las Palmas de G.C., Spain	6 May 2012	(Spain) Las Palmas	30 June 2017		
17	LW	(Mexico)	Andrés Guardado	28 September 1986 (age 40)	Guadalajara, Mexico	28 May 2012	(Spain) Deportivo La Coruña	30 June 2016	Mexico	
21	CM	(Spain)	Dani Parejo	16 April 1989 (age 37)	Coslada, Spain	14 June 2011	(Spain) Getafe	30 June 2016		
23	AM	(Spain)	Sergio Canales	16 February 1991 (age 35)	Santander, Spain	30 July 2011	(Spain) Real Madrid	30 June 2017		
24	CM	(Argentina)	Tino Costa	9 January 1985 (age 41)	Las Flores, Argentina	1 July 2010	(France) Montpellier	30 June 2015	Argentina	
28	LW	(Spain)	Juan Bernat	1 March 1993 (age 33)	Cullera, Spain	27 August 2011 (d)	Youth system, since beginnings	30 June 2015		
32	CM	(Spain)	Portu	21 May 1992 (age 34)	Beniel, Spain		Youth system, signed from (Spain) Real Murcia (youth team)	30 June 2013		Valencia Mestalla member
38	CM	(Spain)	Mario Arqués	19 January 1992 (age 34)	Alacant, Spain		Youth system, signed from (Spain) Villarreal B	30 June 2014		Valencia Mestalla member
–	CM	(Spain)	Carles Gil	22 November 1992 (age 33)	Valencia, Spain		Youth system, since beginnings	30 June 2016		Out on loan at Elche; Valencia Mestalla member
Forwards
7	SS	(Brazil)	Jonas	1 April 1984 (age 42)	Bebedouro, Brazil	24 January 2011	(Brazil) Grêmio	30 June 2015	Brazil	Without European Union citizenship
9	ST	(Spain)	Roberto Soldado	27 May 1985 (age 41)	Valencia, Spain	10 June 2010	(Spain) Getafe	30 June 2017	Spain	
16	ST	(Paraguay)	Nelson Valdez	28 November 1983 (age 42)	San Joaquín, Paraguay	15 August 2012	(Russia) Rubin Kazan	30 June 2015	Paraguay	Without European Union citizenship
27	ST	(Spain)	Paco Alcácer	30 August 1993 (age 33)	Torrent, Spain	11 November 2010 (d)	Youth system, signed from Monte-Sión	30 June 2016		Out on loan at Getafe

Notes: (d), debut in first team in an official match

=== Transfers ===
==== In ====
No.	Pos.	Nat.	Name	Age	EU	Moving from	Type	Transfer window	Ends	Transfer fee	Source
	FW	(Honduras)	Anthony Lozano	18	Non-EU	Olimpia (Honduras)	Loan	Summer	2013	€ 0.1M	ElHeraldo.hn
15	AM	(Spain)	Jonathan Viera	22	EU	Las Palmas	Transfer	Summer	2017	€ 2.5M	ValenciaCF.com
12	RB	(Portugal)	João Pereira	28	EU	Sporting CP (Portugal)	Transfer	Summer	2015	€ 3.7M	ValenciaCF.com
17	LW	(Mexico)	Andrés Guardado	25	EU	Deportivo La Coruña	Transfer	Summer	2016	Free	ValenciaCF.com
	AM	(Spain)	Míchel	23	EU	Hércules	Loan return	Summer	2013	N/A	Liga BBVA
	GK	(Spain)	Miguel Ángel Moyà	28	EU	Getafe	Loan return	Summer	2013	N/A	DeporteValenciano.com
	AM	(Argentina)	Chori Domínguez	31	Non-EU	River Plate (Argentina)	Loan return	Summer	2013	N/A	Fichajes.com
26	GK	(Spain)	Felipe Ramos	24	EU	Deportivo La Coruña	Loan	Summer	2013	N/A	Superdeporte.es
5	DM	(Argentina)	Fernando Gago	26	EU	Real Madrid	Transfer	Summer	2016	€ 3.5M	ValenciaCF.com
23	AM	(Spain)	Sergio Canales	21	EU	Real Madrid	Transfer	Summer	2017	€ 8M	Superdeporte.es
27	ST	(Spain)	Paco Alcácer	18	EU	Valencia Mestalla	Promoted	Summer	2016	N/A	Superdeporte.es
28	LW	(Spain)	Juan Bernat	19	EU	Valencia Mestalla	Promoted	Summer	2015	N/A	Superdeporte.es
16	ST	(Paraguay)	Nelson Valdez	28	Non-EU	Rubin Kazan (Russia)	Loan	Summer	2013	N/A	Levante-EMV.com
3	LB	(France)	Aly Cissokho	24	EU	Lyon (France)	Transfer	Summer	2016	€ 5M	ValenciaCF.com
16	ST	(Paraguay)	Nelson Valdez	29	Non-EU	Rubin Kazan (Russia)	Transfer	Winter	2015	€ 3M	Levante-EMV.com

Total expenditure: ▼€25.8 million

==== Out ====
No.	Pos.	Nat.	Name	Age	EU	Moving to	Type	Transfer window	Transfer fee	Source
15	CB	(Spain)	Ángel Dealbert	29	EU	Kuban Krasnodar (Russia)	End of contract	Summer	Free	Marca.com
3	CB	(Netherlands)	Hedwiges Maduro	27	EU	Sevilla	End of contract	Summer	Free	Superdeporte.es
2	RB	(Spain)	Bruno	31	EU	Brighton & Hove Albion (England)	End of contract	Summer	Free	BBC.co.uk
43	GK	(Portugal)	Cristiano	21	EU	Braga (Portugal)	End of loan	Summer	Free	ValenciaPlaza.com
23	RWB	(Portugal)	Miguel	32	EU		End of contract	Summer	Free	ValenciaPlaza.com
	AM	(Spain)	Míchel	23	EU	Levante	Contract cancellation	Summer	N/A	ValenciaCF.com
11	ST	(Spain)	Aritz Aduriz	31	EU	Athletic Bilbao	Transfer	Summer	€ 2.5M	ValenciaCF.com
	GK	(Spain)	Miguel Ángel Moyà	31	EU	Getafe	Transfer	Summer	€ 2M	Superdeporte.es
17	LB	(Spain)	Jordi Alba	23	EU	Barcelona	Transfer	Summer	€ 14M	ValenciaCF.com
5	MF	(Turkey)	Mehmet Topal	26	Non-EU	Fenerbahçe (Turkey)	Transfer	Summer	€ 4.5M	Superdeporte.es
	MF	(Spain)	Carles Gil	19	EU	Elche CF	Loan	Summer	N/A	Superdeporte.es
	AM	(Argentina)	Alejandro Domínguez	31	Non-EU	Rayo Vallecano	Contract cancellation	Summer	N/A	Superdeporte.es
27	ST	(Spain)	Paco Alcácer	18	EU	Getafe	Loan	Summer	N/A	Superdeporte.es
19	MF	(Spain)	Pablo Hernández	27	EU	Swansea City (Wales)	Transfer	Summer	€ 7M	ValenciaCF.com
5	DM	(Argentina)	Fernando Gago	26	EU	Vélez Sarsfield (Argentina)	Loan	Winter	N/A	ValenciaCF.com

Total income: ▲€30 million

== Club ==
=== Technical staff ===
Position	Staff
Head coach	Ernesto Valverde
Second coach	Jon Aspiazu
Physical trainer	José Antonio Pozanco
Goalkeeping trainer	José Manuel Ochotorena
Delegate	Salvador González 'Voro'
Kit manager	Bernardo España Edo 'Españeta'
Kit manager	José Manuel López
Kit manager	Vicente Navarro Navarro 'Serreta'
Kit manager	Iván Montero Rodríguez
Kit manager	Vicente Ventura Deval

Source: Valencia CF Official Website

== Statistics ==
=== Player statistics ===
Player	Total	La Liga	Copa del Rey	Champions League	Notes

N	P	Name	Nat.	GS	App	Goals	Min	App	Goals	App	Goals	App	Goals	Notes
1	GK	Diego Alves	(Brazil)	27	27	-41	2430	24	-39	1		2	-2	
3	LB	Aly Cissokho	(France)	28	36	2	2608	25	2	4		7		
4	CB	Adil Rami	(France)	35	36	2	3067	25		5	1	6	1	
5	DM	Fernando Gago	(Argentina)	14	18		1208	13		1		4		Out on loan at Vélez Sársfield
6	DM	David Albelda	(Spain)	22	27		1691	18		4		5		
7	SS	Jonas	(Brazil)	42	49	19	3317	35	13	6	1	8	5	
8	AM	Sofiane Feghouli	(Algeria)	33	37	6	2903	27	3	2		8	3	
9	ST	Roberto Soldado	(Spain)	40	46	30	3676	35	24	4	2	7	4	
10	CM	Éver Banega	(Argentina)	27	40	4	2548	29	4	6		5		
11	LW	Pablo Piatti	(Argentina)	12	19	1	1081	14	1	3		2		
12	RB	João Pereira	(Portugal)	34	37		3047	30		2		5		
13	GK	Vicente Guaita	(Spain)	25	25	-26	2250	14	-15	5	-5	6	-6	
14	RB	Antonio Barragán	(Spain)	16	23		1508	14		4		5		
15	AM	Jonathan Viera	(Spain)	11	25	2	1103	17	2	5		3		
16	ST	Nelson Valdez	(Paraguay)	11	40	9	1278	28	6	5	2	7	1	
17	LW	Andrés Guardado	(Mexico)	36	44	1	3198	32	1	5		7		
18	CB	Víctor Ruiz	(Spain)	25	34		2297	26		5		3		
20	CB	Ricardo Costa	(Portugal)	34	36	4	2985	26	4	4		6		
21	CM	Dani Parejo	(Spain)	28	36	2	2680	27	1	4	1	5		
22	LB	Jérémy Mathieu	(France)	17	18	1	1509	17	1			1		
23	AM	Sergio Canales	(Spain)	7	15	2	636	13	2	1		1		
24	CM	Tino Costa	(Argentina)	37	42	3	3249	31	1	3	2	8		
26	GK	Felipe Ramos	(Spain)											
28	LW	Juan Bernat	(Spain)	7	15	1	646	12		3	1			
30	CB	Carlos Delgado	(Spain)	1	1		90					1		
33	LB	Salva Ruiz	(Spain)	1	1		90			1				
36	LB	José Luis Gayà	(Spain)	1	1		90			1				

Source: Match reports in La Liga Matches, Copa del Rey Matches, UEFA Champions League Matches and ValenciaCF.com, LFP.es
Ordered by shirt number
0 shown as blank

Goals for goalkeepers are goals against

=== Disciplinary record ===
Includes all competitive matches. The list is sorted by shirt number.

N	P	Nat.	Name	La Liga			Copa del Rey			Champions League			Others			Total			Notes
N	P	Nat.	Name	Yellow card	Second yellow card	Red card	Yellow card	Second yellow card	Red card	Yellow card	Second yellow card	Red card	Yellow card	Second yellow card	Red card	Yellow card	Second yellow card	Red card	Notes
1	GK	(Brazil)	Diego Alves																
3	DF	(France)	Aly Cissokho	6		1										6		1	
4	DF	(France)	Adil Rami	6	1					1	1					7	2		
5	MF	(Argentina)	Fernando Gago	3						1						4			Out on loan at Vélez Sársfield
6	MF	(Spain)	David Albelda	11						2						13			
7	FW	(Brazil)	Jonas	5		2	1			1						7		2	
8	MF	(Algeria)	Sofiane Feghouli	8	1											8	1		
9	FW	(Spain)	Roberto Soldado	10			1			4						15			
10	MF	(Argentina)	Éver Banega	7			1			1						9			
11	MF	(Argentina)	Pablo Piatti	4												4			
12	DF	(Portugal)	João Pereira	9			1			1						11			
13	GK	(Spain)	Vicente Guaita	1						2						3			
14	DF	(Spain)	Antonio Barragán	4			2			2		1				8		1	
15	MF	(Spain)	Jonathan Viera	2												2			
16	MF	(Paraguay)	Nelson Valdez	4												4			
17	MF	(Mexico)	Andrés Guardado	6												6			
18	DF	(Spain)	Víctor Ruiz	8			3			1						12			
20	DF	(Portugal)	Ricardo Costa	9	2		2			1						12	2		
21	MF	(Spain)	Dani Parejo	10			1			1						12			
22	DF	(France)	Jérémy Mathieu	4												4			
23	MF	(Spain)	Sergio Canales	1												1			
24	MF	(Argentina)	Tino Costa	7		1	2			2						11		1	
26	GK	(Spain)	Felipe Ramos																
28	MF	(Spain)	Juan Bernat	1												1			
30	DF	(Spain)	Carlos Delgado																
33	DF	(Spain)	Salva Ruiz																
36	DF	(Spain)	José Luis Gayà																

Source: Match reports in La Liga Matches, Copa del Rey Matches, UEFA Champions League Matches and ValenciaCF.com, LFP.es
Ordered by (red card) , (second yellow card) and (yellow card)
(yellow card) = Number of bookings; (second yellow card) = Number of sending offs after a second yellow card; (red card) = Number of sending offs by a direct red card.

== Pre-season and friendlies ==
20 July 2012 Summer of Champions; Germany Tour	Eintracht Braunschweig (Germany)	1–1	(Spain) Valencia	Braunschweig, Germany
18:30 CEST	Dogan 9'; Drüppel (yellow card) 66'	VCF Report; SD Report; AS Report; MARCA Report	Jonas 27'; Soldado (yellow card) 44'; Alves (yellow card) 71'	Stadium: Eintracht-Stadion; Attendance: 13,500; Referee: Michael Weiner (Germany)

22 July 2012 Germany Tour	Rödinghausen (Germany)	0–4	(Spain) Valencia	Rödinghausen, Germany
15:00 CEST		VCF Report; SD Report; AS Report; MARCA Report	Jonas 25'; Piatti 45'; Gil 57'; Guardado (yellow card) 85'; Feghouli 86'	Stadium: Häcker-Wiehenstadion; Attendance: 2,500; Referee: Florian Visse (Germany)

25 July 2012 Germany Tour	Arminia Bielefeld (Germany)	1–1	(Spain) Valencia	Bielefeld, Germany
19:00 CEST	Jerat (yellow card) 26'; Testroet (yellow card) 39'; Burmeister 74'	VCF Report; SD Report; AS Report; MARCA Report	Soldado (yellow card) 39'; Feghouli 77'; Pereira (yellow card) 87'	Stadium: SchücoArena; Attendance: 3,747; Referee: Sören Storks (Germany)

28 July 2012 Trofeu Taronja; Beneficial: Wildfire in Valencia province	Valencia (Spain)	1–1 (2 – 0 p)	(Portugal) Porto	Valencia, Spain
21:30 CEST	Jonas 63'	VCF Report; SD Report; AS Report; MARCA Report; Live TV: Gol T	González 57'; Sereno (yellow card) 77'	Stadium: Mestalla; Attendance: 23,000; Referee: Mateo Valero (Spain, Valencian Committee)
	Penalties
	Parejo (penalty scored); Gago (penalty scored); Bernat (penalty missed)		(penalty missed) Kléber; (penalty missed) Iturbe; (penalty missed) Kelvin; (penalty missed) Moutinho
Note: Orange Trophy winner: Valencia

4 August 2012 Asia Tour	Indonesia	0–5	(Spain) Valencia	Jakarta, Indonesia
16:30 CEST		VCF Report; SD Report; AS Report; MARCA Report; Live TV: Gol T (Indonesia) RCTI	Piatti 4'; Alcácer 12', 56'; Gago (yellow card) 21'; R. Costa 25'; Hernández 52'	Stadium: Gelora Bung Karno; Attendance: 45,000; Referee: Faulur Rosi (Indonesia)

9 August 2012 Presentation - Trofeo Estrella Damm	Valencia (Spain)	2–0	(England) Tottenham Hotspur	Valencia, Spain
22:00 CEST	Jonas 18'; Feghouli 77'; R. Costa (red card) 82'	VCF Report; SD Report; AS Report; MARCA Report; Live TV: Gol T		Stadium: Mestalla; Attendance: 42,000; Referee: Ayza Gámez (Spain, Valencian Committee)
Note: Trofeo Estrella Damm winner: Valencia

11 August 2012 Summer of Champions	Eintracht Frankfurt (Germany)	4–2	(Spain) Valencia	Frankfurt, Germany
15:30 CEST	Demidov (yellow card) 17'; Occéan 19', 62'; Aigner 21'; Hoffer 81'	VCF Report; SD Report; AS Report; MARCA Report; Live TV: Gol T, hr	Piatti 26'; Hernández 52'	Stadium: Commerzbank-Arena; Attendance: 20,100; Referee: Viktor Kassai (Hungary)

6 September 2012 Trofeu; Ciutat d'Alcoi	Alcoyano (Spain)	0–3	(Spain) Valencia	Alcoi, Spain
21:00 CEST		VCF Report; SD Report; AS Report; MARCA Report	Barragán 18'; Piatti 51'; Viera 88'	Stadium: El Collao; Attendance: 5,000; Referee: Barberá Fuentes (Spain, Valencian Committee)
Note: Trofeu Ciutat d'Alcoi winner: Valencia

12 October 2012 Training match	Valencia (Spain)	4–0	(Spain) Ribarroja	Paterna, Spain
11:00 CEST	Jonas (?); Bernat (?)	VCF Report; SD Report; Las Provincias Report		Stadium: Mini Estadi

21 March 2013 90th CD Castellón Anniversary	Castellón (Spain)	1–5	(Spain) Valencia	Castelló de la Plana, Spain
21:30 CET	Charly 30'	VCF Report; SD Report; AS Report; MARCA Report; Live TV: Canal 9	Mathieu 38'; Jonas 52'; Molina 74'; Viera 77'; Rami (yellow card) 78'; Lozano 82'	Stadium: Nou Castàlia; Attendance: 7,000; Referee: Fernando Navarro Collado (Spain, Valencian Committee)

== Competitions ==
=== Overall ===
Competition	Started round	Current position / round	Final position / round	First match	Last match
La Liga	—	—	5th	19 August 2012	1 June 2013
Copa del Rey	Round of 32	—	Quarter-finals	30 October 2012	23 January 2013
Champions League	Group stage	—	Round of 16	19 September 2012	6 March 2013

Source: Competitions

=== Overall friendly trophies ===
Trophy	Organizer	Type	Result	Place	First match	Last match
XLI Trofeu Taronja	Valencia	One match trophy	Winners	Mestalla, Valencia (Spain)	28 July 2012	
Trofeo Estrella Damm	Estrella Damm	One match trophy	Winners	Mestalla, Valencia (Spain)	9 August 2012	
XXXVI Trofeu Ciutat d'Alcoi	Alcoyano	One match trophy	Winners	El Collao, Alcoi (Spain)	6 September 2012	

Source: Friendlies

=== Qualifying for next season competitions ===
Competition	Organizer	Reason	Date assured	Starting round
2013–14 Copa del Rey	RFEF	As member of 2012–13 La Liga	20 July 2012	Round of 32
2013–14 La Liga	LFP, RFEF	As one of 17 best 2012–13 La Liga teams	13 April 2013	–
2013–14 UEFA Europa League	UEFA	As 5th placed in 2012–13 La Liga	1 June 2013	Group stage

=== La Liga ===
==== League table ====
Pos	Team	Pld	W	D	L	GF	GA	GD	Pts	Qualification or relegation
3	Atlético Madrid	38	23	7	8	65	31	+34	76	Qualification for the Champions League group stage
4	Real Sociedad	38	18	12	8	70	49	+21	66	Qualification for the Champions League play-off round
5	Valencia	38	19	8	11	67	54	+13	65	Qualification for the Europa League group stage (Note: Since the 2012–13 Copa del Rey champions Atlético Madrid and runners-up Real Madrid qualified for the 2013–14 UEFA Champions League, the 5th, 6th and 7th placed teams qualified for the group stage, play-off round, and third qualifying round of the 2013–14 UEFA Europa League respectively.)
6	Málaga	38	16	9	13	53	50	+3	57	(Note: Málaga was excluded from participating in any UEFA club competition in 2013–14 season as a punishment for not complying with UEFA Financial Fair Play Regulations. Málaga appealed against this UEFA ban, but the Court of Arbitration for Sport confirmed the decision of the UEFA Club Financial Control Body.)
7	Real Betis	38	16	8	14	57	56	+1	56	Qualification for the Europa League play-off round

Source: La Liga
Rules for classification: 1st points; 2nd head-to-head points; 3rd head-to-head goal difference; 4th goal difference; 5th number of goals scored; 7th Fair-play points

==== Results summary ====
Overall								Home						Away					
Pld	W	D	L	GF	GA	GD	Pts	W	D	L	GF	GA	GD	W	D	L	GF	GA	GD
38	19	8	11	67	54	+13	65	13	3	3	42	25	+17	6	5	8	25	29	−4

Last updated: 1 June 2013.
Source: Competitive matches

==== Results by round ====
Round	1	2	3	4	5	6	7	8	9	10	11	12	13	14	15	16	17	18	19	20	21	22	23	24	25	26	27	28	29	30	31	32	33	34	35	36	37	38
Ground	A	H	A	H	A	H	A	H	A	H	A	H	A	H	A	H	H	A	H	H	A	H	A	H	A	H	A	H	A	H	A	H	A	H	A	A	H	A
Result	D	D	L	W	L	W	L	W	L	W	D	W	L	L	W	L	W	W	W	L	W	D	W	W	D	D	L	W	D	W	D	W	L	W	W	W	W	L
Position	12	13	17	11	15	10	14	9	11	9	9	8	11	12	10	11	9	8	7	7	7	6	5	5	5	5	7	5	6	5	6	5	6	5	5	5	4	5

Updated to match(es) played on 1 June 2013. Source: Competitive matches
A = Away; H = Home; W = Win; D = Draw; L = Loss

==== Matches ====
19 August 2012 1	Real Madrid	1–1	Valencia	Madrid
19:00 (CEST)	Higuaín 10'; Alonso (yellow card) 73'	Report; VCF Report; SD Report; AS Report; MARCA Report; Live TV: Gol T /	Feghouli (yellow card) 31'; Jonas 42'; Ruiz (yellow card) 50'; Pereira (yellow card) 82'; Piatti (yellow card) 86'	Stadium: Santiago Bernabéu; Attendance: 74,000; Referee: Carlos Delgado Ferreiro (Basque Country)

26 August 2012 2	Valencia	3–3	Deportivo La Coruña	Valencia
23:00 (CEST)	Soldado 11', 28', (yellow card) 83'; R. Costa (yellow card) 20' (yellow-red card) 75'; Feghouli 41'; Mathieu (yellow card) 62'; Pereira (yellow card) 78'; Ruiz (yellow card) 83'; Parejo (yellow card) 89'	Report; VCF Report; SD Report; AS Report; MARCA Report; Live TV: Gol T /	Marchena (yellow card) 26'; Aguilar 38', 58'; Oliveira (yellow card) 69'; Pizzi 76' (pen.)	Stadium: Mestalla; Attendance: 38,000; Referee: Carlos Velasco Carballo (Community of Madrid)

2 September 2012 3	Barcelona	1–0	Valencia	Barcelona
21:30 (CEST)	Piqué (yellow card) 13'; Adriano 22'	Report; VCF Report; SD Report; AS Report; MARCA Report; Live TV:	Guardado (yellow card) 28'; Albelda (yellow card) 64'; Rami (yellow card) 87'	Stadium: Camp Nou; Attendance: 76,352; Referee: Miguel Pérez Lasa (Basque Country)

15 September 2012 4	Valencia	2–1	Celta Vigo	Valencia
18:00 (CEST)	Feghouli 3'; Parejo (yellow card) 28'; Cissokho 50'; Barragán (yellow card) 85'; Rami (yellow card) 86'	Report; VCF Report; SD Report; AS Report; MARCA Report; Live TV: Gol T /	Cabral 15', (yellow card) 58'; Insa (yellow card) 33'	Stadium: Mestalla; Attendance: 40,000; Referee: José Luis Paradas Romero (Andalusia)

23 September 2012 5	Mallorca	2–0	Valencia	Palma
12:00 (CEST)	Víctor 8'; Pereira (yellow card) 42'; Arizmendi 55', (yellow card) 60'; López (yellow card) 63'; Pina (yellow card) 64'	Report; VCF Report; SD Report; AS Report; MARCA Report; Live TV: Gol T /	T. Costa (yellow card) 29'; Parejo (yellow card) 39'; Soldado (yellow card) 63'; Cissokho (yellow card) 75'	Stadium: Iberostar; Attendance: 14,495; Referee: Alfonso Javier Álvarez Izquierdo (Catalonia)

29 September 2012 6	Valencia	2–0	Zaragoza	Valencia
16:00 (CEST)	Feghouli 11', (yellow card) 44' (yellow-red card) 66'; T. Costa (yellow card) 47'; Viera 58'; Soldado (yellow card) 81'	Report; VCF Report; SD Report; AS Report; MARCA Report; Live TV: Gol T /	José Mari (yellow card) 23'; Săpunaru (yellow card) 73'	Stadium: Mestalla; Attendance: 40,000; Referee: Pedro Jesús Pérez Montero (Andalusia)

7 October 2012 7	Levante	1–0	Valencia	Valencia
12:00 (CEST)	Ballesteros (yellow card) 34'; Juanlu (yellow card) 44'; Martins 21', (yellow card) 46'; Míchel (yellow card) 78'; Munúa (yellow card) 87'	Report; VCF Report; SD Report; AS Report; MARCA Report; Live TV: Gol T /	Ruiz (yellow card) 33'; T. Costa (yellow card) 38'; Jonas (yellow card) 41'; Viera (yellow card) 78'; Valdez (yellow card) 88'	Stadium: Ciutat de València; Attendance: 20,060; Referee: Carlos del Cerro Grande (Community of Madrid)

20 October 2012 8	Valencia	3–2	Athletic Bilbao	Valencia
20:00 (CEST)	Soldado 25' (pen.), (yellow card) 70'; Barragán (yellow card) 57'; T. Costa 86'; Valdez (yellow card) 79', (goal) 88'	Report; VCF Report; SD Report; AS Report; MARCA Report; Live TV: Gol T /	Aduriz 18', 29'; Ekiza (yellow card) 25'; Herrera (red card) 67'; De Marcos (yellow card) 78'	Stadium: Mestalla; Attendance: 35,000; Referee: Alberto Undiano Mallenco (Navarre)

27 October 2012 9	Real Betis	1–0	Valencia	Seville
18:00 (CEST)	Sevilla 8'	Report; VCF Report; SD Report; AS Report; MARCA Report; Live TV: Gol T /	Pereira (yellow card) 4'; Viera (yellow card) 72'; R. Costa (yellow card) 85'; Rami (yellow card) 89'; Banega (yellow card) 89'	Stadium: Benito Villamarín; Attendance: 33,783; Referee: Alejandro José Hernández Hernández (Canary Islands)

3 November 2012 10	Valencia	2–0	Atlético Madrid	Valencia
22:00 (CET)	Soldado 20'; R. Costa (yellow card) 62' (yellow-red card) 90'; Ruiz (yellow card) 65'; Pereira (yellow card) 86'; Cissokho (yellow card) 87'; Valdez 90+5'	Report; VCF Report; SD Report; AS Report; MARCA Report; Live TV:	Turan (yellow card) 19'; Tiago (yellow card) 61'; Miranda (yellow card) 87'; Falcao (yellow card) 88'	Stadium: Mestalla; Attendance: 40,000; Referee: Fernando Teixeira Vitienes (Cantabria)

11 November 2012 11	Valladolid	1–1	Valencia	Valladolid
12:00 (CET)	Pérez 64' (pen.)	Report; VCF Report; SD Report; AS Report; MARCA Report; Live TV: Gol T /	Cissokho 14', (red card) 64'	Stadium: Nuevo José Zorrilla; Attendance: 15,512; Referee: Carlos Velasco Carballo (Community of Madrid)

17 November 2012 12	Valencia	2–1	Espanyol	Valencia
18:00 (CET)	Viera 15'; Albelda (yellow card) 24'; Jonas (yellow card) 29'; Soldado (yellow card) 37', (goal) 89' (pen.); Ruiz (yellow card) 42'; T. Costa (yellow card) 56'; Guardado (yellow card) 59'; Barragán (yellow card) 77'	Report; VCF Report; SD Report; AS Report; MARCA Report; Live TV: Gol T /	Longo 30'; Álvarez (yellow card) 64'; Rodríguez (yellow card) 65'; Forlín (yellow card) 69'; Verdú (yellow card) 88'; Wakaso (yellow card) 88'; Tejera (yellow card) 88'; García (red card) 88'; Moreno (yellow card) 88', (red card) 88'	Stadium: Mestalla; Attendance: 40,000; Referee: Carlos del Cerro Grande (Community of Madrid)

24 November 2012 13	Málaga	4–0	Valencia	Málaga
20:00 (CET)	Portillo 7'; Joaquín (yellow card) 58'; Weligton (yellow card) 63'; Saviola 75'; Santa Cruz 81'; Isco 89'	Report; VCF Report; SD Report; AS Report; MARCA Report; Live TV: Gol T /	Guardado (yellow card) 10'; Banega (yellow card) 28'; Gago (yellow card) 39'; Feghouli (yellow card) 61'; T. Costa (yellow card) 71'; Rami (yellow card) 73' (yellow-red card) 84'	Stadium: La Rosaleda; Attendance: 25,607; Referee: César Muñiz Fernández (Asturias)

1 December 2012 14	Valencia	2–5	Real Sociedad	Valencia
18:00 (CET)	Soldado 2', 73'; Ruiz (yellow card) 16'; Jonas (red card) 41'; Banega (yellow card) 77'	Report; VCF Report; SD Report; AS Report; MARCA Report; Live TV: Gol T /	C. Martínez (yellow card) 33'; De la Bella 43'; González 56'; Ifrán 64'; Vela (yellow card) 67', (goal) 89' (pen.); Agirretxe 83'	Stadium: Estadio Mestalla; Attendance: 35,000; Referee: Carlos Clos Gómez (Aragon)

8 December 2012 15	Osasuna	0–1	Valencia	Pamplona
22:00 (CET)	Lolo (yellow card) 69'; Damià (yellow card) 78'	Report; VCF Report; SD Report; AS Report; MARCA Report; Live TV: Gol T /	R. Costa (yellow card) 25'; Soldado 55'; Albelda (yellow card) 80'	Stadium: El Sadar; Attendance: 13,849; Referee: Ignacio Iglesias Villanueva (Galicia)

16 December 2012 16	Valencia	0–1	Rayo Vallecano	Valencia
17:00 (CET)	T. Costa (yellow card) 82'; Parejo (yellow card) 87'	Report; VCF Report; SD Report; AS Report; MARCA Report; Live TV: Gol T /	Vázquez (yellow card) 16'; Piti (yellow card) 21'; Amat (yellow card) 43'; Casado (yellow card) 56'; Rubén (yellow card) 78'; Domínguez 83' (pen.)	Stadium: Mestalla; Attendance: 35,453; Referee: Alfonso Javier Álvarez Izquierdo (Catalonia)

21 December 2012 17	Valencia	4–2	Getafe	Valencia
20:00 (CET)	Soldado 1', (yellow card) 85'; Jonas 6'; R. Costa 29'; Rami (yellow card) 39'; Albelda (yellow card) 88'; Valdez 89'	Report; VCF Report; SD Report; AS Report; MARCA Report; Live TV: Gol T /	Vázquez 12', (yellow card) 85'; Rafa (yellow card) 15'; Alexis 58'; X. Torres (yellow card) 81'; M. Torres (yellow card) 85'	Stadium: Mestalla; Attendance: 25,000; Referee: Carlos Delgado Ferreiro (Basque Country)

5 January 2013 18	Granada	1–2	Valencia	Granada
18:00 (CET)	M. Rico (yellow card) 13' (yellow-red card) 33'; Torje (yellow card) 23'; Angulo 49'; López (yellow card) 54'; Roberto (yellow card) 59'	Report; VCF Report; SD Report; AS Report; MARCA Report; Live TV: Gol T /	R. Costa (yellow card) 16'; Valdez (yellow card) 59'; Jonas 59'; Piatti 81', (yellow card) 81'	Stadium: Los Cármenes; Attendance: 21,000; Referee: Alberto Undiano Mallenco (Navarre)

12 January 2013 19	Valencia	2–0	Sevilla	Valencia
22:00 (CET)	Parejo (yellow card) 38'; Soldado 50', 87'; Pereira (yellow card) 84'; Ruiz (yellow card) 89'	Report; VCF Report; SD Report; AS Report; MARCA Report; Live TV: Gol T /	Navarro (yellow card) 46'; Rakitić (yellow card) 55'	Stadium: Mestalla; Attendance: 35,000; Referee: Javier Estrada Fernández (Catalonia)

20 January 2013 20	Valencia	0–5	Real Madrid	Valencia
21:00 (CET)	Jonas (yellow card) 23'; Gago (yellow card) 39'; Banega (yellow card) 62'	Report; VCF Report; SD Report; AS Report; MARCA Report; Live TV:	Higuaín 8'; Arbeloa (yellow card) 19'; Coentrão (yellow card) 29'; Di María 34', 44', (yellow card) 52'; Ronaldo 35', 41'; Essien (yellow card) 80'	Stadium: Mestalla; Attendance: 40,000; Referee: José Antonio Teixeira Vitienes (Cantabria)

26 January 2013 21	Deportivo La Coruña	2–3	Valencia	A Coruña
22:00 (CET)	Gama (yellow card) 13'; Manuel Pablo (yellow card) 14'; Sílvio (yellow card) 16' (yellow-red card) 52'; Riki 32', 44'; Assunção (red card) 89'	Report; VCF Report; SD Report; AS Report; MARCA Report; Live TV: Gol T /	Jonas 1'; Piatti (yellow card) 31'; T. Costa (yellow card) 36'; Valdez 62'; R. Costa 89'	Stadium: Riazor; Attendance: 30,000; Referee: Carlos Clos Gómez (Aragon)

3 February 2013 22	Valencia	1–1	Barcelona	Valencia
19:00 (CET)	Banega 33'; Cissokho (yellow card) 40'; Soldado (yellow card) 47'; Guardado (yellow card) 75'	Report; VCF Report; SD Report; AS Report; MARCA Report; Live TV: Gol T / /	Mascherano (yellow card) 23'; Messi 39' (pen.)	Stadium: Mestalla; Attendance: 45,000; Referee: José Luis González González (Castile and León)

9 February 2013 23	Celta Vigo	0–1	Valencia	Vigo
18:00 (CET)	Oubiña (yellow card) 57'; Aspas (yellow card) 57'	Report; VCF Report; SD Report; AS Report; MARCA Report; Live TV: Gol T /	R. Costa (yellow card) 15'; Albelda (yellow card) 29'; Barragán (yellow card) 71'; Feghouli (yellow card) 76'; Valdez 89'	Stadium: Balaídos; Attendance: 18,710; Referee: Fernando Teixeira Vitienes (Cantabria)

17 February 2013 24	Valencia	2–0	Mallorca	Valencia
17:00 (CET)	Parejo (yellow card) 5'; Bernat (yellow card) 21'; T. Costa (red card) 27'; Soldado (yellow card) 53', (goal) 80'; R. Costa 59'; Canales (yellow card) 84'; Cissokho (yellow card) 87'	Report; VCF Report; SD Report; AS Report; MARCA Report; Live TV: Gol T /	Luna (yellow card) 14'; Geromel (yellow card) 19'; Márquez (yellow card) 75'	Stadium: Estadio Mestalla; Attendance: 40,000; Referee: Miguel Ángel Pérez Lasa (Basque Country)

23 February 2013 25	Zaragoza	2–2	Valencia	Zaragoza
18:00 (CET)	Apoño 4'; Postiga 31', (yellow card) 51'; José Mari (yellow card) 39'; Franco (red card) 77'; Oriol (yellow card) 85'; Alcolea (yellow card) 87'; Álvaro (yellow card) 89'	Report; VCF Report; SD Report; AS Report; MARCA Report; Live TV: Gol T /	Ruiz (yellow card) 3'; Albelda (yellow card) 24'; Jonas 35', 69'; Cissokho (yellow card) 37'; Banega (yellow card) 84'	Stadium: La Romareda; Attendance: 18,000; Referee: Carlos del Cerro Grande (Community of Madrid)

2 March 2013 26	Valencia	2–2	Levante	Valencia
22:00 (CET)	Jonas 26'; Soldado 44'; Guaita (yellow card) 85'; Guardado (yellow card) 89'	Report; VCF Report; SD Report; AS Report; MARCA Report; Live TV: Gol T /	Iborra 16', (yellow card) 82'; Barkero (yellow card) 30', (goal) 88'; Vyntra (yellow card) 60'; Navarro (yellow card) 88'; Ballesteros (yellow card) 90'	Stadium: Mestalla; Attendance: 40,000; Referee: Carlos Velasco Carballo (Community of Madrid)

10 March 2013 27	Athletic Bilbao	1–0	Valencia	Bilbao
12:00 (CET)	Iturraspe (yellow card) 57'; Muniain 79'	Report; VCF Report; SD Report; AS Report; MARCA Report; Live TV: Gol T /	Valdez (yellow card) 24'; Parejo (yellow card) 32'; Mathieu (yellow card) 34'; Albelda (yellow card) 52'; Feghouli (yellow card) 67'; Soldado (yellow card) 82'	Stadium: San Mamés; Attendance: 38,000; Referee: José Antonio Teixeira Vitienes (Cantabria)

16 March 2013 28	Valencia	3–0	Real Betis	Valencia
22:00 (CET)	Soldado 15' (pen.); Rami (yellow card) 37'; Mathieu (yellow card) 43'; Feghouli (yellow card) 75'; Paulão 85' (o.g.); Jonas 89'	Report; VCF Report; SD Report; AS Report; MARCA Report; Live TV: Gol T /	Nacho (yellow card) 10'; Amaya (red card) 15'; Molina (yellow card) 57'; Ángel (yellow card) 75'	Stadium: Mestalla; Attendance: 35,000; Referee: César Muñiz Fernández (Asturias)

31 March 2013 29	Atlético Madrid	1–1	Valencia	Madrid
21:00 (CEST)	Falcao 5'; Costa (yellow card) 63'; Koke (yellow card) 79'; Filipe Luís (yellow card) 89'	Report; VCF Report; SD Report; AS Report; MARCA Report; Live TV:	Jonas 4'; Parejo (yellow card) 42'; Piatti (yellow card) 51'; Pereira (yellow card) 74'	Stadium: Vicente Calderón; Attendance: 38,000; Referee: Xavier Estrada Fernández (Catalonia)

7 April 2013 30	Valencia	2–1	Valladolid	Valencia
21:00 (CEST)	Balenziaga 38' (o.g.); Parejo (yellow card) 65'; Jonas 89', (yellow card) 89'	Report; VCF Report; SD Report; AS Report; MARCA Report; Live TV: Gol T /	Sereno (yellow card) 26' (yellow-red card) 56'; Óscar 70'	Stadium: Estadio Mestalla; Attendance: 40,000; Referee: Alejandro José Hernández Hernández (Canary Islands)

13 April 2013 31	Espanyol	3–3	Valencia	Cornellà de Llobregat
20:00 (CEST)	Mubarak 45'; Sánchez (yellow card) 61'; Verdú 82'; Rodríguez (red card) 89'; García 90'	Report; VCF Report; SD Report; AS Report; MARCA Report; Live TV: Gol T /	R. Costa (yellow card) 23'; Canales 52'; Jonas 86'; Albelda (yellow card) 89'; Soldado 89'	Stadium: Cornellà-El Prat; Attendance: 24,054; Referee: José Luis González González (Castile and León)

20 April 2013 32	Valencia	5–1	Málaga	Valencia
22:00 (CEST)	Parejo 25'; Soldado 27', 29' (pen.); Canales 31'; Banega (yellow card) 36', (goal) 55'; Pereira (yellow card) 44'; Albelda (yellow card) 51'	Report; VCF Report; SD Report; AS Report; MARCA Report; Live TV: Gol T /	Demichelis (yellow card) 29'; Baptista 44'; Isco (yellow card) 46'; Camacho (yellow card) 50'; Weligton (yellow card) 69'; Duda (yellow card) 71'; Gámez (yellow card) 86'	Stadium: Mestalla; Attendance: 40,000; Referee: José Antonio Teixeira Vitienes (Cantabria)

28 April 2013 33	Real Sociedad	4–2	Valencia	San Sebastián
21:00 (CEST)	I. Martínez (yellow card) 19', (goal) 33'; Bergara (yellow card) 27'; Castro 73'; Illarramendi (yellow card) 81'; Agirretxe 85', 89'	Report; VCF Report; SD Report; AS Report; MARCA Report; Live TV:	Cissokho (yellow card) 14'; Soldado 24'; Mathieu (yellow card) 36'; Banega (yellow card) 45'; Albelda (yellow card) 65'; Jonas 88'	Stadium: Anoeta; Attendance: 28,097; Referee: David Fernández Borbalán (Andalusia)

4 May 2013 34	Valencia	4–0	Osasuna	Valencia
16:00 (CEST)	Jonas (yellow card) 14', (goal) 89' (pen.); Soldado 38'; R. Costa 43'; Banega 59'; Pereira (yellow card) 85'	Report; VCF Report; SD Report; AS Report; MARCA Report; Live TV: Gol T /	Silva (yellow card) 41'; Arribas (red card) 57'; Timor (yellow card) 68' (yellow-red card) 74'; Bertrán (yellow card) 87'; Nano (yellow card) 89'	Stadium: Estadio Mestalla; Attendance: 35,000; Referee: Carlos del Cerro Grande

12 May 2013 35	Rayo Vallecano	0–4	Valencia	Madrid
12:00 (CEST)	Trashorras (yellow card) 26'; Domínguez (yellow card) 39'; Delibašić (yellow card) 44'; Nacho (yellow card) 60'; Amat (yellow card) 70'	Report; VCF Report; SD Report; AS Report; MARCA Report; Live TV: Gol T /	Soldado 21' (pen.), 33'; Guardado (yellow card) 38', (goal) 61'; Feghouli (yellow card) 88'; Valdez 89'	Stadium: Campo de Fútbol de Vallecas; Attendance: 9,041; Referee: Carlos Delgado Ferreiro (Basque Country)

18 May 2013 36	Getafe	0–1	Valencia	Getafe
18:00 (CEST)	Valera (yellow card) 14'; Lafita (yellow card) 19'	Report; VCF Report; SD Report; AS Report; MARCA Report; Live TV: Gol T /	R. Costa (yellow card) 29'; Mathieu 43'	Stadium: Coliseum Alfonso Pérez; Attendance: 7,000; Referee: Fernando Teixeira Vitienes (Cantabria)

26 May 2013 37	Valencia	1–0	Granada	Valencia
20:00 (CEST)	Soldado 59'	Report; VCF Report; SD Report; AS Report; MARCA Report; Live TV: Gol T (MultiGol) /		Stadium: Mestalla; Attendance: 40,000; Referee: Jesús Gil Manzano (Extremadura)

1 June 2013 38	Sevilla	4–3	Valencia	Seville
21:00 (CEST)	Negredo 40', 44' (pen.), 57', 61'; Navarro (yellow card) 41'; Cala (yellow card) 75'; Coke (yellow card) 83'	Report; VCF Report; SD Report; AS Report; MARCA Report; Live TV:	Banega 12'; Soldado (yellow card) 35', (goal) 56', 88'; R. Costa (yellow card) 42'; Albelda (yellow card) 43'; Jonas (red card) 45'; Parejo (yellow card) 45+2'; Pereira (yellow card) 71'; Feghouli (yellow card) 89'	Stadium: Ramón Sánchez Pizjuán; Attendance: 35,000; Referee: Carlos Clos Gómez (Aragon)

=== Copa del Rey ===
==== Round of 32 ====
30 October 2012 First leg	Llagostera	0–2	Valencia	Llagostera (Girona)
20:00 CET	Aimar (yellow card) 18'; Sellarés (yellow card) 77'; Masó (yellow card) 78'; Canal (yellow card) 86'	Report; VCF Report; SD Report; AS Report; MARCA Report; Live TV: Gol T /	R. Costa (yellow card) 4'; Jonas 44'; Ruiz (yellow card) 64'; Valdez 68'; Barragán (yellow card) 81'	Stadium: Municipal de Llagostera; Attendance: 2,500; Referee: (Extremadura) Jesús Gil Manzano

28 November 2012 Second leg	Valencia	3–1 (5–1 agg.)	Llagostera	Valencia
19:30 CET	Rami 14'; Valdez 57'; Parejo (yellow card) 67'; Bernat 78'	Report; VCF Report; SD Report; AS Report; MARCA Report; Live TV: Gol T / Multideporte 3	Pitu (yellow card) 40'; Rubio 83'	Stadium: Mestalla; Attendance: 8,000; Referee: (Cantabria) José Antonio Teixeira Vitienes

==== Round of 16 ====
11 December 2012 First leg	Osasuna	0–2	Valencia	Pamplona
20:00 CET	Timor (yellow card) 6'	Report; VCF Report; SD Report; AS Report; MARCA Report; Live TV: Gol T /	Jonas (yellow card) 26'; Parejo 47'; Barragán (yellow card) 88'; Soldado 89'	Stadium: El Sadar; Attendance: 10,885; Referee: (Basque Country (autonomous community)) Miguel Pérez Lasa

8 January 2013 Second leg	Valencia	2–1 (4–1 agg.)	Osasuna	Valencia
21:30 CET	T. Costa 34'; Soldado 89'	Report; VCF Report; SD Report; AS Report; MARCA Report; Live TV: Gol T /	Rubén (yellow card) 30'; Llorente 37'; Timor (yellow card) 81'	Stadium: Mestalla; Attendance: 15,000; Referee: (Community of Madrid) Carlos Velasco Carballo

==== Quarter-finals ====
15 January 2013 First leg	Real Madrid	2–0	Valencia	Madrid
21:00 CET	Benzema 36'; Albiol (yellow card) 69'; Guardado 73' (o.g.); Alonso (yellow card) 74'; Khedira (yellow card) 89'	Report; VCF Report; SD Report; AS Report; MARCA Report; Live TV:	T. Costa (yellow card) 46'; Ruiz (yellow card) 67'; Soldado (yellow card) 73'	Stadium: Santiago Bernabéu; Attendance: 68,000; Referee: (Asturias) César Muñiz Fernández

23 January 2013 Second leg	Valencia	1–1 (1–3 agg.)	Real Madrid	Valencia
21:30 CET	Ruiz (yellow card) 39'; Pereira (yellow card) 42'; T. Costa (yellow card) 44', (goal) 51'; R. Costa (yellow card) 79'; Banega (yellow card) 89'	Report; VCF Report; SD Report; AS Report; MARCA Report; Live TV:	Benzema 43'; Coentrão (yellow card) 44' (yellow-red card) 50'; Ronaldo (yellow card) 65'; Nacho (yellow card) 68'; Modrić (yellow card) 88'; Di María (red card) 89'	Stadium: Mestalla; Attendance: 40,000; Referee: (Basque Country (autonomous community)) Miguel Pérez Lasa

=== UEFA Champions League ===
==== Group stage ====
Pos	Team	Pld	W	D	L	GF	GA	GD	Pts	Qualification	BAY	VAL	BATE	LIL
1	(Germany) Bayern Munich	6	4	1	1	15	7	+8	13 (Note: Head-to-head points: Bayern Munich 4, Valencia 1.)	Advance to knockout phase	—	2–1	4–1	6–1
2	(Spain) Valencia	6	4	1	1	12	5	+7	13	Advance to knockout phase	1–1	—	4–2	2–0
3	(Belarus) BATE Borisov	6	2	0	4	9	15	−6	6	Transfer to Europa League	3–1	0–3	—	0–2
4	(France) Lille	6	1	0	5	4	13	−9	3		0–1	0–1	1–3	—

Source: Soccerway
Notes:

19 September 2012 1	Bayern Munich (Germany)	2–1	(Spain) Valencia	Munich, Germany
20:45 (CEST)	Schweinsteiger 38'; Kroos 76'	Report; VCF Report; SD Report; AS Report; MARCA Report; Live TV: ZDF, C+ Liga de Campeones 2	T. Costa (yellow card) 75'; Rami (yellow card) 82' (yellow-red card) 90+3'; R. Costa (yellow card) 85'; Valdez 90+1'	Stadium: Allianz Arena; Attendance: 68,000; Referee: Fırat Aydınus (Turkey)

2 October 2012 2	Valencia (Spain)	2–0	(France) Lille	Valencia, Spain
20:45 (CEST)	Soldado (yellow card) 14'; Barragán (yellow card) 33'; Jonas 38', 75', (yellow card) 80'	Report; VCF Report; SD Report; AS Report; MARCA Report; Live TV: C+ Liga de Campeones	Debuchy (yellow card) 43' (yellow-red card) 86'; Pedretti (yellow card) 71'	Stadium: Mestalla; Attendance: 28,517; Referee: Gianluca Rocchi (Italy)

23 October 2012 3	BATE Borisov (Belarus)	0–3	(Spain) Valencia	Minsk^{1}, Belarus
20:45 (CEST)	Simić (yellow card) 45+1'; Pawlaw (yellow card) 59'	Report; VCF Report; SD Report; AS Report; MARCA Report; Live TV: Idman TV, C+ Liga de Campeones	Soldado (yellow card) 40', (goal) 45+1' (pen.), 55', 69'; Albelda (yellow card) 61'	Stadium: Dynama Stadium^{1} Attendance: 29,180; Referee: Craig Thomson (Scotland)

7 November 2012 4	Valencia (Spain)	4–2	(Belarus) BATE Borisov	Valencia, Spain
20:45 (CET)	Jonas 26'; Soldado 29' (pen.); Gago (yellow card) 32'; Feghouli 51', 86'	Report; VCF Report; SD Report; AS Report; MARCA Report; Live TV: C+ Liga de Campeones 2	Bardachow (yellow card) 25'; Bressan 53'; Radyyonaw (yellow card) 56'; Sivakov (yellow card) 58'; Radzkow (yellow card) 62'; Mazalewski 83'	Stadium: Mestalla; Attendance: 22,795; Referee: Tom Harald Hagen (Norway)

20 November 2012 5	Valencia (Spain)	1–1	(Germany) Bayern Munich	Valencia, Spain
20:45 (CET)	Barragán (yellow card) 20', (red card) 33'; Feghouli 77'; Soldado (yellow card) 84'; Guaita (yellow card) 88'	Report; VCF Report; SD Report; AS Report; MARCA Report; Live TV:, TV3	Dante (yellow card) 20'; Martínez (yellow card) 45+1'; Müller 82'	Stadium: Mestalla; Attendance: 35,407; Referee: Howard Webb (England)

5 December 2012 6	Lille (France)	0–1	(Spain) Valencia	Villeneuve d'Ascq, France
20:45 (CET)	Mavuba (yellow card) 35'; Béria (yellow card) 52'; Balmont (yellow card) 55'	Report; VCF Report; SD Report; AS Report; MARCA Report; Live TV: C+ Liga de Campeones	Jonas 36' (pen.); T. Costa (yellow card) 81'; Guaita (yellow card) 82'	Stadium: Grand Stade Lille Métropole; Attendance: 40,036; Referee: Aleksandar Stavrev (Macedonia)

Note: BATE Borisov played their home matches at Dynama Stadium, Minsk instead of their own Haradski Stadium.

==== Knockout phase ====
===== Round of 16 =====
12 February 2013 First leg	Valencia (Spain)	1–2	(France) Paris Saint-Germain	Valencia, Spain
20:45 CET	Pereira (yellow card) 32'; Rami 90'	Report; VCF Report; SD Report; AS Report; MARCA Report; Live TV:, TV3	Lavezzi 10'; Verratti (yellow card) 32'; Pastore 43'; Ibrahimović (red card) 90+2'	Stadium: Mestalla; Attendance: 44,000; Referee: Paolo Tagliavento (Italy)

6 March 2013 Second leg	Paris Saint-Germain (France)	1–1 (3–2 agg.)	(Spain) Valencia	Paris, France
20:45 CET	Lavezzi 66', (yellow card) 67'	Report; VCF Report; SD Report; AS Report; MARCA Report; Live TV: ZDF, C+ Liga de Campeones	Albelda (yellow card) 22'; Ruiz (yellow card) 38'; Jonas 55'; Soldado (yellow card) 80'; Parejo (yellow card) 84'; Banega (yellow card) 90+2'	Stadium: Parc des Princes; Attendance: 44,867; Referee: Milorad Mažić (Serbia)
