= 2015–16 Valencia CF season =

96th season in existence of Valencia CF

Valencia
2015–16 season
- Owner: Peter Lim
- President: Chan Lay Hoon
- Head coach: Nuno Espírito Santo (until 29 November 2015); Voro (caretaker) (starting 30 November 2015 until 5 December); Gary Neville (starting 6 December 2015 until 30 March 2016); Pako Ayestarán (from 30 March 2016)
- Stadium: Mestalla
- La Liga: 12th
- Copa del Rey: Semi-finals
- UEFA Champions League: Group stage
- UEFA Europa League: Round of 16
- Top goalscorer: League: Paco Alcácer (13); All: Paco Alcácer (15)
Home colours	Away colours	Third colours

The 2015–16 season was Valencia Club de Fútbol's 96th in the club's history and their 81st in La Liga. The club qualified for the UEFA Champions League for the first time since 2012–13. They began in the play-off round, where a win over Monaco saw them qualify for the group stages, where they competed in Group H, finishing third and dropping into the round of 32 of the UEFA Europa League. Valencia also competed in the Copa del Rey, entering at the round of 32 and being eliminated by Barcelona 8–1 on aggregate in the semi-finals.

== Players ==
As of 20 August 2015

Note: Flags indicate national team as defined under FIFA eligibility rules; some limited exceptions apply. Players may hold more than one non-FIFA nationality.

No.	Pos.	Nation	Player
1	GK	BRA	Diego Alves (3rd captain)
2	DF	POR	João Cancelo
3	DF	POR	Rúben Vezo
4	DF	BRA	Aderlan Santos
5	DF	GER	Shkodran Mustafi
6	DF	BRA	Guilherme Siqueira (on loan from Atlético Madrid)
7	FW	ESP	Álvaro Negredo (vice-captain)
8	MF	ALG	Sofiane Feghouli
9	FW	ESP	Paco Alcácer (captain)
10	MF	ESP	Dani Parejo
11	MF	ARG	Pablo Piatti
12	MF	BRA	Danilo (on loan from Braga)

No.	Pos.	Nation	Player
13	GK	ESP	Jaume Domènech
14	DF	ESP	José Luis Gayà
15	MF	ARG	Enzo Pérez
16	MF	BEL	Zakaria Bakkali
17	FW	ESP	Rodrigo
18	MF	ESP	Javi Fuego (4th captain)
19	DF	ESP	Antonio Barragán
21	MF	POR	André Gomes
22	FW	ESP	Santi Mina
23	DF	TUN	Aymen Abdennour
24	MF	RUS	Denis Cheryshev (on loan from Real Madrid)
25	GK	AUS	Mathew Ryan

=== From the Youth Squad ===
Note: Flags indicate national team as defined under FIFA eligibility rules; some limited exceptions apply. Players may hold more than one non-FIFA nationality.

No.	Pos.	Nation	Player
28	FW	ESP	Rafa Mir
29	MF	FRA	Wilfried Zahibo
30	MF	ESP	Fran Villalba
31	DF	MLI	Ibrahim Diallo

=== Out on loan ===
Note: Flags indicate national team as defined under FIFA eligibility rules; some limited exceptions apply. Players may hold more than one non-FIFA nationality.

No.	Pos.	Nation	Player
—	GK	ESP	Yoel (at Rayo Vallecano until 30 June 2016)
—	DF	ESP	Salva Ruiz (at Granada until 30 June 2016)
—	DF	ARG	Lucas Orbán (at Levante until 30 June 2016)
—	MF	ESP	Nando García (at Córdoba until 30 June 2016)

No.	Pos.	Nation	Player
—	MF	ESP	Robert (at Granada until 30 June 2016)
—	MF	ARG	Rodrigo De Paul (at Racing Club until 30 June 2016)
—	MF	ARG	Fede Cartabia (at Deportivo La Coruña until 30 June 2016)
—	FW	BRA	Vinícius Araújo (at Cruzeiro until 30 June 2016)

== Transfers ==
=== In ===
No.	Pos.	Nat.	Name	Age	EU	Moving from	Type	Transfer window	Ends	Transfer fee	Source
7	ST	(Spain)	Álvaro Negredo	29	EU	Manchester City	Transfer	Summer	2020	€27,000,000	Valencia
2	RB	(Portugal)	João Cancelo	21	EU	Benfica	Transfer	Summer	2021	€15,000,000	Valencia
21	MF	(Portugal)	André Gomes	21	EU	Benfica	Transfer	Summer	2020	€15,000,000	Valencia
	FW	(Spain)	Rodrigo	24	EU	Benfica	Transfer	Summer	2019	€30,000,000	Valencia
	GK	(Australia)	Mathew Ryan	23	Non-EU	Club Brugge	Transfer	Summer	2021	€7,000,000	
	FW	(Spain)	Santi Mina	19	EU	Celta Vigo	Transfer	Summer	2021	€10,000,000	Valencia
	AM	(Belgium)	Zakaria Bakkali	19	EU	PSV	Transfer	Summer	2020	Free	Valencia
	DM	(Brazil)	Danilo	19	Non-EU	Braga	Loan	Summer	2016		Valencia
	DF	(Brazil)	Aderlan Santos	26	Non-EU	Braga	Transfer	Summer	2020	€9,000,000	
	DF	(Tunisia)	Aymen Abdennour	26	Non-EU	Monaco	Transfer	Summer	2020	€22,000,000	

Total spending: ▼€128,000,000

=== Out ===
No.	Pos.	Nat.	Name	Age	EU	Moving from	Type	Transfer window	Ends	Transfer fee	Source
	ST	(Brazil)	Vinícius Araújo	22	Non-EU	Cruzeiro	Loan	Summer	2016	N/A	Valencia
	DM	(Brazil)	Filipe Augusto	21	Non-EU	Rio Ave	Loan Return	Summer	2016	N/A	Valencia
	CB	(Spain)	Víctor Ruiz	26	EU	Villarreal	Transfer	Summer		€2,700,000	Villarreal
	RW	(Spain)	Robert	22	EU	Granada	Loan	Summer	2016	N/A	Marca
	LB	(Spain)	Salva Ruiz	20	EU	Granada	Loan	Summer	2016	N/A	Marca
	LW	(Argentina)	Fede Cartabia	22	Non-EU	Deportivo La Coruña	Loan	Summer	2016	N/A	Inside Spanish Football
	CB	(Argentina)	Nicolás Otamendi	27	Non-EU	Manchester City	Transfer	Summer		€45,000,000	BBC Sport

Total income: ▲€47,700,000

Total expenditure: ▼€80,300,000

== Competitions ==
=== Overall ===
Competition	Started round	Final position / round	First match	Last match
La Liga	Matchday 1		22 August 2015	
Copa del Rey	Round of 32		2 December 2015	
UEFA Champions League	Group stage	3rd	16 September 2015	9 December 2015

Updated to match played August 2015
Source: Competitions

=== Overview ===
Competition	Record							
Competition	Pld	W	D	L	GF	GA	GD	Win %
La Liga	38	11	11	16	46	48	−2	28.95
Champions League	8	3	0	5	9	12	−3	37.50
Europa League	4	3	0	1	12	2	+10	75.00
Copa del Rey	8	5	2	1	15	10	+5	62.50
Total	58	22	13	23	82	72	+10	37.93

Last updated: 13 May 2016
Source: Competitions

=== La Liga ===
==== League table ====
Pos	Team	Pld	W	D	L	GF	GA	GD	Pts
10	Real Betis	38	11	12	15	34	52	−18	45
11	Las Palmas	38	12	8	18	45	53	−8	44 (Note: Las Palmas finished ahead of Valencia on head-to-head record; Valencia 1–1 Las Palmas, Las Palmas 2–1 Valencia.)
12	Valencia	38	11	11	16	46	48	−2	44
13	Espanyol	38	12	7	19	40	74	−34	43 (Note: Espanyol finished ahead of Eibar on head-to-head goal difference; Eibar 2–1 Espanyol, Espanyol 4–2 Eibar.)
14	Eibar	38	11	10	17	49	61	−12	43

Source: La Liga, Soccerway
Rules for classification: 1) Points; 2) Head-to-head points; 3) Head-to-head goal difference; 4) Goal difference; 5) Goals scored; 6) Fair-play points; 7) Play-off.

==== Results summary ====
Overall								Home						Away					
Pld	W	D	L	GF	GA	GD	Pts	W	D	L	GF	GA	GD	W	D	L	GF	GA	GD
38	11	11	16	48	50	−2	44	6	7	6	25	23	+2	5	4	10	23	27	−4

Last updated: 13 May 2016.
Source: Competitive matches

==== Results by round ====
Round	1	2	3	4	5	6	7	8	9	10	11	12	13	14	15	16	17	18	19	20	21	22	23	24	25	26	27	28	29	30	31	32	33	34	35	36	37	38
Ground	A	H	A	H	A	H	A	H	A	H	A	H	A	H	A	H	A	H	A	H	A	H	A	H	A	H	A	H	A	H	A	H	A	H	A	H	A	H
Result	D	D	W	D	L	W	L	W	L	W	W	D	L	D	D	D	L	D	L	D	D	L	L	W	W	L	W	L	L	L	L	W	W	W	D	L	L	L
Position	15	10	8	7	10	8	9	8	9	7	7	8	9	8	8	9	10	10	11	11	11	12	13	12	11	11	9	11	12	14	15	14	12	8	8	9	11	12

Updated to match(es) played on 13 May 2016. Source: Competitive matches
A = Away; H = Home; W = Win; D = Draw; L = Loss

==== Matches ====
Win Draw Loss

22 August 2015 1	Rayo Vallecano	0–0	Valencia	Madrid
22:30 CEST (UTC+02:00)	Tito (yellow card) 42'; Manucho (yellow card) 49'; Nacho (yellow card) 74'	Report	Mustafi (yellow card) 56'	Stadium: Campo de Vallecas; Attendance: 9,442; Referee: Alberto Undiano Mallenco (Navarre)

30 August 2015 2	Valencia	1–1	Deportivo La Coruña	Valencia
20:30 CEST (UTC+02:00)	Danilo (yellow card) 45'; Negredo 45'; Barragán (yellow card) 72' (red card) 84'; De Paul (yellow card) 86'	Report	Lucas 39'; Lux (yellow card) 78'	Stadium: Mestalla; Attendance: 40,734; Referee: José González González

12 September 2015 3	Sporting Gijón	0–1	Valencia	Gijón
18:15 CEST (UTC+02:00)	Mascarell (yellow card) 45'; P. Pérez (yellow card) 77'	Report	Parejo (yellow card) 30'; E. Pérez (yellow card) 41'; Fuego (yellow card) 81'; Alcácer 90+1'	Stadium: El Molinón; Attendance: 23,206; Referee: Carlos del Cerro Grande

19 September 2015 4	Valencia	0–0	Real Betis	Valencia
18:15 CEST (UTC+02:00)	Orbán (yellow card) 46'; Mustafi (yellow card) 49'; De Paul (yellow card) 78'; Fuego (yellow card) 86'	Report	Ceballos (yellow card) 21' (yellow-red card) 48'; Vargas (yellow card) 30'; Adán (yellow card) 90+3'	Stadium: Mestalla; Attendance: 40,560; Referee: Carlos Velasco Carballo

22 September 2015 5	Espanyol	1–0	Valencia	Cornellà de Llobregat
20:00 CEST (UTC+02:00)	Álvarez 18'; Álvaro (yellow card) 23'; Sánchez (yellow card) 26'; H. Pérez (yellow card) 41'; R. Duarte (yellow card) 53'; Cañas (yellow card) 86'	Report	Rodrigo (yellow card) 38'; Mina (yellow card) 39'; Bakkali (yellow card) 50'; Gayà (yellow card) 60'; Danilo (yellow card) 70'; Piatti (yellow card) 86'; E. Pérez (yellow card) 86'	Stadium: Cornellà-El Prat; Attendance: 18,231; Referee: Ignacio Iglesias Villanueva

25 September 2015 6	Valencia	1–0	Granada	Valencia
20:30 CEST (UTC+02:00)	Mustafi 26', (yellow card) 34'; Pérez (yellow card) 30'; Orbán (yellow card) 71'	report	Dória (yellow card) 31'; Lopes (yellow card) 38'; Uche (yellow card) 72'	Stadium: Mestalla; Attendance: 37,158; Referee: Carlos Clos Gómez

4 October 2015 7	Athletic Bilbao	3–1	Valencia	Bilbao
16:00 CEST (UTC+02:00)	Laporte 34'; Susaeta 60'; Aduriz 69'	Report	Parejo 20', (yellow card) 33'; Feghouli (yellow card) 58'; Cancelo (yellow card) 58'; Orbán (yellow card) 67'	Stadium: San Mamés; Attendance: 41,508; Referee: Xavier Estrada Fernández (Catalonia)

18 October 2015 8	Valencia	3–0	Málaga	Valencia
22:00 CEST (UTC+02:00)	Charles 19' (o.g.); Gomes 33'; Fuego (yellow card) 62'; Mina (yellow card) 64'; Parejo (yellow card) 86', (goal) 89' (pen.)	Report	Angeleri (yellow card) 23'; Rosales (yellow card) 60'; Albentosa (yellow card) 88'	Stadium: Mestalla; Attendance: 35,819; Referee: Alejandro Hernández Hernández (Las Palmas)

25 October 2015 9	Atlético Madrid	2–1	Valencia	Madrid
20:30 CET (UTC+01:00)	Martínez 32'; Carrasco 40', (yellow card) 52'; Juanfran (yellow card) 80'; Correa (yellow card) 87'; Gabi (yellow card) 90+3'	Report	Mustafi (yellow card) 15'; Parejo (yellow card) 53'; Pérez (yellow card) 64'; Alcácer 72' (pen.); Gomes (yellow card) 84'	Stadium: Vicente Calderón; Attendance: 47,075; Referee: Jesús Gil Manzano

1 November 2015 10	Valencia	3–0	Levante	Valencia
--:-- CET (UTC+01:00)	Pérez (yellow card) 28'; Alcácer 64' (pen.); Gomes (yellow card) 66'; Feghouli 72'; Bakkali 80'	Report	García (yellow card) 36'; Rubén (yellow card) 62'	Stadium: Mestalla; Attendance: 39,147; Referee: Ricardo de Burgos Bengoetxea

8 November 2015 11	Celta Vigo	1–5	Valencia	Vigo
16:00 CET (UTC+01:00)	Fernández 24', (yellow card) 73'	Report	Alcácer 13', 46'; Fuego (yellow card) 27'; Gayà (yellow card) 37'; Parejo 45', 65'; Mustafi (yellow card) 50', (goal) 79'	Stadium: Balaídos; Attendance: 22,131; Referee: Iñaki Vicandi Garrido

22 November 2015 12	Valencia	1–1	Las Palmas	Valencia
21:00 CET (UTC+01:00)	Alcácer 8'; Mustafi (yellow card) 26'; Cancelo (yellow card) 56'; Pérez (yellow card) 65'	Report	Viera 57'; Momo (yellow card) 16'; El Zhar (yellow card) 81'; David Simón (yellow card) 89'	Stadium: Mestalla; Attendance: 32125; Referee: Pedro Pérez Montero

29 November 2015 13	Sevilla	1–0	Valencia	Seville
20:30 CET (UTC+01:00)	Rami (yellow card) 17'; Escudero 50'; Mariano (yellow card) 71'; Vitolo (yellow card) 84'	Report	Cancelo (yellow card) 10' (yellow-red card) 35'; Gayà (yellow card) 13'; Abdennour (yellow card) 20'; Fuego (yellow card) 57' (yellow-red card) 78'	Stadium: Ramón Sánchez Pizjuán; Attendance: 34,914; Referee: Carlos Velasco Carballo (Community of Madrid)

5 December 2015 14	Valencia	1–1	Barcelona	Valencia
20:30 CET (UTC+01:00)	Parejo (yellow card) 70'; Danilo (yellow card) 77'; Mina 86'; Gayà (yellow card) 87'	Report	Mascherano (yellow card) 16'; Suárez 59'	Stadium: Mestalla; Attendance: 46,799; Referee: Santiago Jaime Latre (Aragon)

13 December 2015 15	Eibar	1–1	Valencia	Eibar
16:00 CET (UTC+01:00)	Mauro (yellow card) 15'; Enrich 45'; Capa (yellow card) 69'; Juncà (yellow card) 71'; García (yellow card) 74'; Ramis (red card) 90+2'	Report	De Paul (yellow card) 31'; Orbán (yellow card) 47' (red card) 63'; Mustafi (yellow card) 65'; Fuego (yellow card) 84'; Gomes 85'	Stadium: Ipurua; Attendance: 5,182; Referee: José González González

19 December 2015 16	Valencia	2–2	Getafe	Valencia
16:00 CET (UTC+01:00)	Danilo (yellow card) 9'; Alcácer 15'; Mina 35'; Barragán (yellow card) 81'	Report	Sarabia 10'; Lago (yellow card) 14'; Lafita 22', (yellow card) 90+3'; Alexis (yellow card) 45+1'; Pedro León (yellow card) 77'; Suárez (yellow card) 79'; J. Rodríguez (yellow card) 85'	Stadium: Mestalla; Attendance: 31,598; Referee: David Fernández Borbalán

31 December 2015 17	Villarreal	1–0	Valencia	Villarreal
16:00 CET (UTC+01:00)	Bruno 64'; Soldado (yellow card) 68'	Report	Gomes (yellow card) 16'; Barragán (yellow card) 45'; Villalba (yellow card) 90+2'	Stadium: El Madrigal; Attendance: 18,526; Referee: Alfonso Álvarez Izquierdo

3 January 2016 18	Valencia	2–2	Real Madrid	Valencia
20:30 CET (UTC+01:00)	Parejo 45+1' (pen.); Barragán (yellow card) 57'; Alcácer 83'	Report	Benzema 16'; Pepe (yellow card) 45'; Kovačić (red card) 68'; Bale 82'	Stadium: Mestalla; Attendance: 47,185; Referee: José María Sánchez Martínez

10 January 2016 19	Real Sociedad	2–0	Valencia	San Sebastián
16:00 CET (UTC+01:00)	Jonathas (yellow card) 32', (goal) 79', 82'; Pardo (yellow card) 63'; Héctor (yellow card) 90+3'	Report	Abdennour (yellow card) 14'; Cancelo (yellow card) 27'; Pérez (yellow card) 56'; Fuego (yellow card) 65'	Stadium: Anoeta; Attendance: 24,217; Referee: Alejandro Hernández Hernández

17 January 2016 20	Valencia	2–2	Rayo Vallecano	Valencia
12:00 CET (UTC+01:00)	Negredo 55'; Alcácer (yellow card) 86', (goal) 88'	Report	Jozabed 15'; Llorente (yellow card) 19', (goal) 69'; Quini (yellow card) 78'; Bangoura (yellow card) 81'	Stadium: Mestalla; Referee: Eduardo Prieto Iglesias

23 January 2016 21	Deportivo La Coruña	1–1	Valencia	A Coruña
18:15 CET (UTC+01:00)	Lucas 27'; Juanfran (yellow card) 60'; Lux (yellow card) 64'; Arribas (yellow card) 81'	Report	Gomes (yellow card) 47'; Mustafi (yellow card) 78'; Vezo (yellow card) 79'; Negredo 90+3'	Stadium: Riazor; Attendance: 23,782; Referee: Mario Melero López

31 January 2016 22	Valencia	0–1	Sporting Gijón	Valencia
16:00 CET (UTC+01:00)		Report	Sanabria 50' (pen.); Hernández (yellow card) 59'; Vranješ (yellow card) 70'	Stadium: Mestalla; Attendance: 35,277; Referee: José González González

7 February 2016 23	Real Betis	1–0	Valencia	Seville
16:00 CET (UTC+01:00)	Pezzella (yellow card) 11'; Castro 49'; Ceballos (yellow card) 70'; Adán (yellow card) 74'; Montoya (yellow card) 78'	Report	Mustafi (yellow card) 22'; Gomes (yellow card) 27'; Cheryshev (yellow card) 29'; Parejo (yellow card) 35'; Zahibo (yellow card) 58'; Gayà (yellow card) 62' (yellow-red card) 85'	Stadium: Benito Villamarín; Attendance: 40,228; Referee: José María Sánchez Martínez

14 February 2016 24	Valencia	2–1	Espanyol	Valencia
20:30 CET (UTC+01:00)	Pérez (yellow card) 33'; Negredo 71'; Cheryshev 76'	Report	Álvaro (yellow card) 13'; Diop (yellow card) 43'; Ó. Duarte 52'; Abraham (yellow card) 58'	Stadium: Mestalla; Attendance: 34,689; Referee: Carlos del Cerro Grande

21 February 2016 25	Granada	1–2	Valencia	Granada
18:15 CET (UTC+01:00)	Pérez (yellow card) 52'; Success (yellow card) 86'; Édgar 90+3'	Report	Parejo (yellow card) 22', (goal) 55'; Cancelo (yellow card) 84'; Alves (yellow card) 86'; Mina 90'	Stadium: Los Cármenes; Attendance: 14,197; Referee: Iñaki Vicandi Garrido

28 February 2016 26	Valencia	0–3	Athletic Bilbao	Valencia
16:00 CET (UTC+01:00)	Gomes (yellow card) 43'; Cancelo (yellow card) 54'	Report	Merino 73'; Muniain 77'; Aduriz 80'	Stadium: Mestalla; Attendance: 36,654; Referee: Jesús Gil Manzano (Extremadura)

2 March 2016 27	Málaga	1–2	Valencia	Málaga
20:00 CET (UTC+01:00)	Čop 14'; Juanpi (yellow card) 32'; Albentosa (yellow card) 62'; Torres (yellow card) 63'; Duda (yellow card) 64'; Recio (yellow card) 66'; Charles (yellow card) 77'	Report	Mustafi (yellow card) 19'; Gayà (yellow card) 30'; Cheryshev (yellow card) 35', (goal) 49'; Kameni 41' (o.g.); Feghouli (yellow card) 63'; Piatti (yellow card) 90+2'	Stadium: La Rosaleda; Attendance: 20,556; Referee: José González González

6 March 2016 28	Valencia	1–3	Atlético Madrid	Valencia
20:30 CET (UTC+01:00)	Cheryshev 28'; Santos (yellow card) 57' (yellow-red card) 80'; Feghouli (yellow card) 78'	Report	Griezmann 24'; Vietto (yellow card) 64'; Torres 72'; Carrasco 85'	Stadium: Mestalla; Attendance: 40,857; Referee: Alfonso Álvarez Izquierdo

13 March 2016 29	Levante	1–0	Valencia	Valencia
12:00 CET (UTC+01:00)	Simão Mate (yellow card) 61'; Rossi 65'; López (yellow card) 90+2'	Report	Parejo (yellow card) 14'; Abdennour (yellow card) 49'; Fuego (yellow card) 77'; Mustafi (yellow card) 84'	Stadium: Ciutat de València; Attendance: 18,191; Referee: Carlos del Cerro Grande

20 March 2016 30	Valencia	0–2	Celta Vigo	Valencia
--:-- CET (UTC+01:00)	Alcácer (yellow card) 74'	Report	Guidetti 80'; Mallo 84'	Stadium: Mestalla; Attendance: 32.909; Referee: Alberto Undiano Mallenco

3 April 2016 31	Las Palmas	2–1	Valencia	Las Palmas
18:15 CEST (UTC+02:00)	Willian José (yellow card) 33'; Mesa (yellow card) 36'; Viera 50' (pen.); Mustafi 63' (o.g.)	Report	Rodrigo 3'; Barragán (yellow card) 33'; Piatti (yellow card) 37'; Fuego (yellow card) 45'; Mustafi (yellow card) 68'	Stadium: Gran Canaria; Attendance: 26,950; Referee: Pedro Pérez Montero

10 April 2016 32	Valencia	2–1	Sevilla	Valencia
16:30 CEST (UTC+02:00)	Mustafi (yellow card) 32'; Parejo 41'; Pérez (yellow card) 88'; Negredo 90+1'	Report	Llorente (yellow card) 56'; Gameiro 86'	Stadium: Mestalla; Attendance: 41,569; Referee: Iñaki Vicandi Garrido

17 April 2016 33	Barcelona	1–2	Valencia	Barcelona
20:30 CEST (UTC+02:00)	Piqué (yellow card) 35'; Suárez (yellow card) 40'; Messi 63'; Neymar (yellow card) 86'	http://www.fcbarcelona.com/football/first-team/match-archive/2015-2016/league/round-33/fc-barcelona_valencia/report	Barragán (yellow card) 15'; Rakitić 26' (o.g.); Mina 45+1'; Parejo (yellow card) 51'; Gomes (yellow card) 68'	Stadium: Camp Nou; Attendance: 88,667; Referee: David Fernández Borbalán

20 April 2016 34	Valencia	4–0	Eibar	Valencia
20:45 CEST (UTC+02:00)	Alcácer 10', 28', 40'; Cancelo 56'; Abdennour (yellow card) 88'	Report	García (yellow card) 9'; Escalante (yellow card) 60'	Stadium: Mestalla; Attendance: 34,312; Referee: Xavier Estrada Fernández

24 April 2016 35	Getafe	2–2	Valencia	Getafe
18:15 CEST (UTC+02:00)	Sarabia (yellow card) 26'; Gómez (yellow card) 38'; Medrán 59'; Šćepović 68'; Lacen (yellow card) 70'; Suárez (yellow card) 86'	Report	Gomes (yellow card) 39'; Parejo 48'; Alcácer 84'	Stadium: Coliseum Alfonso Pérez; Attendance: 11,637; Referee: Ricardo de Burgos Bengoetxea

1 May 2016 36	Valencia	0–2	Villarreal	Valencia
20:30 CEST (UTC+02:00)	Fuego (yellow card) 42'	Report	Samu 16'; Musacchio (yellow card) 23'; Adrián 33'; Rodri (yellow card) 43'	Stadium: Mestalla; Attendance: 38,283; Referee: Carlos del Cerro Grande

8 May 2016 37	Real Madrid	3–2	Valencia	Madrid
17:00 CEST (UTC+02:00)	Ronaldo 28', 58'; Benzema 42'; Casemiro (yellow card) 52'	Report	Pérez (yellow card) 13'; Siqueira (yellow card) 39'; Gomes (yellow card) 43', (goal) 81'; Rodrigo 55', (red card) 83'; Fuego (yellow card) 69'	Stadium: Santiago Bernabéu; Attendance: 68,903; Referee: David Fernández Borbalán

15 May 2016 38	Valencia	0–1	Real Sociedad	Valencia
20:30 CEST (UTC+02:00)	Vezo (yellow card) 34'; Gomes (yellow card) 70'	Report	Illarramendi (yellow card) 44'; Bautista (yellow card) 55'; Oyarzabal 90+4'	Stadium: Mestalla; Attendance: 27,777; Referee: Carlos Velasco Carballo

=== Copa del Rey ===
==== Round of 32 ====
2 December 2015 First leg	Barakaldo	1–3	Valencia	Barakaldo
21:00	Arroyo 16', (yellow card) 70'; Cerrajería (yellow card) 30'; Aguiar (yellow card) 38'; Valens (red card) 89'	Report	Mir (yellow card) 13'; Cancelo 19', (yellow card) 32'; Diallo (yellow card) 36'; Bakkali (yellow card) 43'; Gayà 65'; Parejo 90+1' (pen.)	Stadium: Lasesarre; Attendance: 5,200; Referee: Eduardo Prieto Iglesias

16 December 2015 Second leg	Valencia	2–0 (5–1 agg.)	Barakaldo	Valencia
21:00	Mina 8'; Negredo 31'; De Paul (yellow card) 89'	Report	Pomares (yellow card) 18'; Cusi (yellow card) 67'	Stadium: Mestalla; Referee: Mario Melero López

==== Round of 16 ====
6 January 2016	Valencia	4–0	Granada	Valencia
16:00	Negredo 8', 63' (pen.), 83' (pen.); Pérez (yellow card) 26'; Rodrigo 35'; Orbán (yellow card) 45+1'	Report	Biraghi (yellow card) 44'; Dória (yellow card) 48'; Édgar (yellow card) 75'; Márquez (yellow card) 79'	Stadium: Mestalla; Attendance: 19,571; Referee: Jesús Gil Manzano

14 January 2016	Granada	0–3 (0–7 agg.)	Valencia	Granada
20:00	Uche (yellow card) 55'; Babin (yellow card) 76'	Report	Orbán (yellow card) 31'; Zahibo 42'; Alcácer 63'; Piatti 84' (pen.)	Stadium: Los Cármenes; Referee: Xavier Estrada Fernández

==== Quarter-finals ====
21 January 2016	Valencia	1–1	Las Palmas	Valencia
20:00	Danilo (yellow card) 17'; Zahibo (yellow card) 37'; Alcácer 61'; Gayà (yellow card) 69'	Report	Zahibo 38' (o.g.); Araujo (yellow card) 40'; Wakaso (yellow card) 77'; Culio (yellow card) 87'; Nauzet (yellow card) 89'	Stadium: Mestalla; Attendance: 15,400; Referee: Carlos del Cerro Grande

28 January 2016	Las Palmas	0–1 (1–2 agg.)	Valencia	Las Palmas
21:00	Viera (yellow card) 40'; Mesa (yellow card) 44'; Culio (yellow card) 45+1'; Aythami (yellow card) 53'	Report	Rodrigo 20', (yellow card) 87'; Piatti (yellow card) 34'; Barragán (yellow card) 39'; Gomes (yellow card) 71'; Mustafi (yellow card) 89'	Stadium: Gran Canaria; Attendance: 18,206; Referee: David Fernández Borbalán

==== Semi-finals ====
3 February 2016	Barcelona	7–0	Valencia	Barcelona
21:00	Suárez 7', 12', 83', 88'; Iniesta (yellow card) 14'; Piqué (yellow card) 24'; Messi 29', 59', 74'; Turan (yellow card) 84'	Report	Mustafi (red card) 45+2'; Feghouli (yellow card) 65'; Cheryshev (yellow card) 79'	Stadium: Camp Nou; Attendance: 60,635; Referee: Ignacio Iglesias Villanueva

10 February 2016	Valencia	1–1 (1–8 agg.)	Barcelona	Valencia
20:00	Diallo (yellow card) 35'; Negredo 39'; Santos (yellow card) 41'; Gayà (yellow card) 63'; Salvador (yellow card) 88'	Report	Munir (yellow card) 54'; Samper (yellow card) 73'; Kaptoum 84'	Stadium: Mestalla; Attendance: 16,296; Referee: Carlos Velasco Carballo

=== UEFA Champions League ===
==== Play-off round ====
19 August 2015 First leg	Valencia (Spain)	3–1	(France) Monaco	Valencia, Spain
20:45 CEST (UTC+02:00)	Rodrigo 4'; Parejo 59', (yellow card) 88'; Mustafi (yellow card) 78'; Feghouli 86', (yellow card) 90+4'	Report	Silva (yellow card) 2'; Pašalić 49', (yellow card) 58'; Dirar (yellow card) 66'; Raggi (yellow card) 90+3'	Stadium: Mestalla; Attendance: 45,633; Referee: Mark Clattenburg (England)

25 August 2015 Second leg	Monaco (France)	2–1 (3–4 agg.)	(Spain) Valencia	Monaco
20:45 CEST (UTC+02:00)	Raggi 17'; Pašalić (yellow card) 38'; Toulalan (yellow card) 56'; Echiéjilé (yellow card) 72', (goal) 75'	Report	Negredo 4'; Vezo (yellow card) 52'; Pérez (yellow card) 73'; Piatti (yellow card) 90+2'	Stadium: Stade Louis II; Attendance: 13,165; Referee: Nicola Rizzoli (Italy)

==== Group stage ====
Pos	Team	Pld	W	D	L	GF	GA	GD	Pts	Qualification	ZEN	GNT	VAL	LYO
1	(Russia) Zenit Saint Petersburg	6	5	0	1	13	6	+7	15	Advance to knockout phase	—	2–1	2–0	3–1
2	(Belgium) Gent	6	3	1	2	8	7	+1	10	Advance to knockout phase	2–1	—	1–0	1–1
3	(Spain) Valencia	6	2	0	4	5	9	−4	6	Transfer to Europa League	2–3	2–1	—	0–2
4	(France) Lyon	6	1	1	4	5	9	−4	4		0–2	1–2	0–1	—

Source: UEFA
Rules for classification: Group stage tiebreakers

16 September 2015 1	Valencia (Spain)	2–3	(Russia) Zenit Saint Petersburg	Valencia, Spain
20:45 CEST (UTC+02:00)	Alcácer (yellow card) 52'; Cancelo 55'; Gomes 73', (yellow card) 90+6'; Mustafi (yellow card) 90+4'	Report	Hulk 9', 44', (yellow card) 90+6'; Smolnikov (yellow card) 16'; Witsel (yellow card) 61', (goal) 76'	Stadium: Mestalla; Attendance: 28,005; Referee: Craig Thomson (Scotland)

29 September 2015 2	Lyon (France)	0–1	(Spain) Valencia	Lyon, France
20:45 CEST (UTC+02:00)	Gonalons (yellow card) 61'; Kalulu (yellow card) 67'; Ferri (yellow card) 90+2'	Report	Feghouli 42'; Fuego (yellow card) 52'; Pérez (yellow card) 63'; Domènech (yellow card) 90+1'	Stadium: Stade de Gerland; Attendance: 33,534; Referee: Milorad Mažić (Serbia)

20 October 2015 3	Valencia (Spain)	2–1	(Belgium) Gent	Valencia, Spain
20:45 CEST (UTC+02:00)	Feghouli 15'; Parejo (yellow card) 18'; Mina (yellow card) 46'; Cancelo (yellow card) 55'; Mitrović 72' (o.g.); Gayà (yellow card) 90'	Report	Asare (yellow card) 22'; Foket 40', (yellow card) 70'; Sayef (yellow card) 66'; Simon (yellow card) 86'	Stadium: Mestalla; Attendance: 38,207; Referee: Felix Zwayer (Germany)

4 November 2015 4	Gent (Belgium)	1–0	(Spain) Valencia	Ghent, Belgium
20:45 CET (UTC+01:00)	Kums 49' (pen.); Raman (yellow card) 73'	Report	Feghouli (yellow card) 30'; Mustafi (yellow card) 62'; Gomes (yellow card) 72'; Pérez (yellow card) 85'	Stadium: Ghelamco Arena; Attendance: 19,452; Referee: Daniele Orsato (Italy)

24 November 2015 5	Zenit Saint Petersburg (Russia)	2–0	(Spain) Valencia	Saint Petersburg, Russia
18:00 CET (UTC+01:00)	Shatov 15'; Criscito (yellow card) 17'; Yusupov (yellow card) 71'; Dzyuba 74'; Witsel (yellow card) 78'	Report	Mir (yellow card) 45'; Vezo (red card) 80'	Stadium: Petrovsky Stadium; Attendance: 17,002; Referee: Svein Oddvar Moen (Norway)

9 December 2015 6	Valencia (Spain)	0–2	(France) Lyon	Valencia, Spain
20:45 CET (UTC+01:00)	Abdennour (yellow card) 24'; Mustafi (yellow card) 38'; Mina (yellow card) 44'	Report	Cornet 37'; Tolisso (yellow card) 68'; Lacazette 76'	Stadium: Mestalla; Attendance: 32,494; Referee: Matej Jug (Slovenia)

=== UEFA Europa League ===
==== Knockout phase ====
===== Round of 32 =====
18 February 2016	Valencia (Spain)	6–0	(Austria) Rapid Wien	Valencia, Spain
21:05	Mina 4', 25'; Parejo 10'; Negredo 29'; Gomes 35'; Cancelo (yellow card) 70'; Rodrigo 89'	Report	Schwab (yellow card) 57'; Grahovac (yellow card) 65'; Petsos (yellow card) 76'	Stadium: Mestalla; Attendance: 28,831; Referee: Miroslav Zelinka (Czech Republic)

25 February 2016	Rapid Wien (Austria)	0–4 (0–10 agg.)	(Spain) Valencia	Vienna, Austria
21:05	Pavelić (yellow card) 37'; Hofmann (yellow card) 56'	Report	Rodrigo 59'; Feghouli 64'; Piatti 72'; Vezo 88'	Stadium: Ernst-Happel-Stadion; Attendance: 39,800; Referee: Paolo Tagliavento (Italy)

===== Round of 16 =====
10 March 2016 First leg	Athletic Bilbao (Spain)	1–0	(Spain) Valencia	Bilbao, Spain
21:05 CET (UTC+01:00)	R. García 20'	Report	Fuego (yellow card) 63'; Danilo (yellow card) 66'; Mustafi (yellow card) 71'	Stadium: San Mamés; Attendance: 35,765; Referee: Björn Kuipers (Netherlands)

17 March 2016	Valencia (Spain)	2–1 (2–2 (a) agg.)	(Spain) Athletic Bilbao	Valencia, Spain
19:00	Mina 13', (yellow card) 40'; Santos 37'; Fuego (yellow card) 42'; Gomes (yellow card) 74'; Vezo (yellow card) 83'	Report	Aduriz 76'; R. García (yellow card) 45+2'; Laporte (yellow card) 77'	Stadium: Mestalla; Attendance: 31,681; Referee: Daniele Orsato (Italy)

== Statistics ==
=== Appearances and goals ===
Last updated on 15 May 2016

No.	Pos	Nat	Player	Total		La Liga		Copa del Rey		Champions League		Europa League	
No.	Pos	Nat	Player	Apps	Goals	Apps	Goals	Apps	Goals	Apps	Goals	Apps	Goals
Goalkeepers
1	GK	(Brazil) BRA	Diego Alves	13	0	13	0	0	0	0	0	0	0
13	GK	(Spain) ESP	Jaume Domènech	24	0	17	0	1	0	6	0	0	0
25	GK	(Australia) AUS	Mathew Ryan	21	0	8	0	7	0	2	0	4	0
Defenders
2	DF	(Portugal) POR	João Cancelo	39	3	25+3	1	3+1	1	5+1	1	1	0
3	DF	(Portugal) POR	Rúben Vezo	27	1	10+5	0	5+1	0	3	0	3	1
4	DF	(Brazil) BRA	Aderlan Santos	28	1	17	0	6	0	2+1	0	2	1
5	DF	(Germany) GER	Shkodran Mustafi	44	2	30	2	4	0	7	0	3	0
6	DF	(Brazil) BRA	Guilherme Siqueira	15	0	14	0	1	0	0	0	0	0
14	DF	(Spain) ESP	José Luis Gayà	36	1	15+5	0	4+1	1	7	0	4	0
19	DF	(Spain) ESP	Antonio Barragán	35	0	19+5	0	5	0	3	0	2+1	0
23	DF	(Tunisia) TUN	Aymen Abdennour	29	0	22	0	2	0	4	0	1	0
31	DF	(Mali) MLI	Ibrahim Diallo	4	0	0	0	2+2	0	0	0	0	0
36	DF	(Spain) ESP	Toni Lato	1	0	0	0	0	0	0	0	0+1	0
Midfielders
8	MF	(Algeria) ALG	Sofiane Feghouli	33	5	13+8	1	0+2	0	7	3	1+2	1
10	MF	(Spain) ESP	Dani Parejo	50	11	30+3	8	6	1	8	1	2+1	1
11	MF	(Argentina) ARG	Pablo Piatti	37	2	9+12	0	5+1	1	2+5	0	3	1
12	MF	(Brazil) BRA	Danilo	34	0	16+3	0	5+1	0	1+4	0	4	0
15	MF	(Argentina) ARG	Enzo Pérez	30	0	16+4	0	2+1	0	7	0	0	0
16	MF	(Belgium) BEL	Zakaria Bakkali	19	1	4+12	1	1+2	0	0	0	0	0
17	MF	(Spain) ESP	Rodrigo	38	7	15+10	2	4	2	2+3	1	3+1	2
18	MF	(Spain) ESP	Javi Fuego	38	0	23+3	0	1	0	5+2	0	3+1	0
21	MF	(Portugal) POR	André Gomes	41	5	27+3	3	3+1	0	2+2	1	2+1	1
24	MF	(Russia) RUS	Denis Cheryshev	8	3	6+1	3	0+1	0	0	0	0	0
28	MF	(Spain) ESP	Tropi	2	0	0+1	0	0	0	0	0	1	0
29	MF	(France) FRA	Wilfried Zahibo	7	1	2	0	4+1	1	0	0	0	0
30	MF	(Spain) ESP	Fran Villalba	4	0	0+1	0	2+1	0	0	0	0	0
34	MF	(Spain) ESP	Sito	1	0	0+1	0	0	0	0	0	0	0
Forwards
7	FW	(Spain) ESP	Álvaro Negredo	40	12	12+13	5	5+1	5	3+2	1	4	1
9	FW	(Spain) ESP	Paco Alcácer	46	15	25+9	13	1+2	2	5+2	0	0+2	0
22	FW	(Spain) ESP	Santi Mina	36	8	18+8	4	4	1	3+1	0	2	3
37	FW	(Spain) ESP	Rafa Mir	3	0	0	0	1	0	1	0	0+1	0
45	FW	(Equatorial Guinea) GEQ	Iban Salvador	1	0	0	0	0+1	0	0	0	0	0
Players who have made an appearance or had a squad number this season but have been loaned out or transferred
6	DF	(Argentina) ARG	Lucas Orbán	12	0	6+1	0	4	0	1	0	0	0
20	MF	(Argentina) ARG	Rodrigo De Paul	6	0	0	0	0+3	0	2+1	0	0	0
