= Divisiones Regionales de Fútbol =

Spanish football regional divisions

The Divisiones Regionales de Fútbol (Regional Football Divisions) are the Spanish football regional divisions. They are administered by the Autonomous football federations. The level immediately above (in the fifth tier) is the Tercera División RFEF. The autonomous regional divisions include:

Community		Level 6	Level 7	Level 8	Level 9	Level 10
Galicia (FGF)		Preferente Galicia (2 groups)	Primeira Autonómica (5 groups)	Segunda Autonómica (13 groups)	Terceira Autonómica (19 groups)	—N/a
Asturias (RFFPA)		Primera RFFPA	Segunda RFFPA (2 groups)	Tercera RFFPA (3 groups)	—N/a	
Cantabria (FCF)		Regional Preferente	Primera Regional	Segunda Regional (2 groups)	—N/a	
Basque Country (FVF - EFF)
Basque Country (FVF - EFF)	Biscay	División de Honor	Territorial Preferente	Territorial Primera (2 groups)	Territorial Segunda (2 groups)	Territorial Tercera (3 groups)
Basque Country (FVF - EFF)	Álava	División de Honor	Primera Regional	—N/a		
Basque Country (FVF - EFF)	Guipúzcoa	División de Honor	Primera Regional (2 groups)	Segunda Regional (4 groups)	—N/a	
Catalonia (FCF)		Lliga Elit	Primera Catalana (3 groups)	Segona Catalana (6 groups)	Tercera Catalana (18 groups)	Quarta Catalana (36 groups)
Valencian Community (FFCV)		Lliga Comunitat (2 groups)	Primera FFCV (4 groups)	Segunda FFCV (8 groups)	Tercera FFCV (15 groups)	—N/a
Community of Madrid (FFM)		Primera Autonómica (2 groups)	Preferente Aficionados (4 groups)	Primera Aficionados (8 groups)	Segunda Aficionados (24 groups)	—N/a
Castile and León (FCyLF)		Primera División Regional (2 groups)	Primera División Provincial (9 groups): Ávila province; Burgos province; León province; Palencia province; Salamanca province; Segovia province; Soria province; Valladolid province; Zamora province	Segunda División Provincial (5 groups): Ávila province; León province; Salamanca province; Segovia province; Valladolid province	Tercera División Provincial (2 groups): Valladolid province (2)	—N/a
Andalusia (FAF)		División de Honor (2 groups)	Primera Andaluza (8 groups): Almería province; Cádiz province; Córdoba province; Granada province; Huelva province; Jaén province; Málaga province; Sevilla province	Segunda Andaluza (8 groups)	Tercera Andaluza (13 groups)	—N/a
Balearic Islands (FFIB)
Balearic Islands (FFIB)	Ibiza and Formentera	Regional Preferente de Ibiza-Formentera	—N/a			
Balearic Islands (FFIB)	Mallorca	Primera Regional Preferente de Mallorca	Primera Regional	Segunda Regional	Tercera Regional (2 groups)	—N/a
Balearic Islands (FFIB)	Menorca	Regional Preferente de Menorca	—N/a			
Canary Islands (FCF)
Canary Islands (FCF)	Las Palmas	Interinsular Preferente de Las Palmas (1 group) (FIFLP)	Primera Regional: 2 groups of Gran Canaria; 1 group of Fuerteventura; 1 group of Lanzarote	Segunda Regional Aficionado-Gran Canaria: 1 group of Gran Canaria	—N/a	
Canary Islands (FCF)	Santa Cruz de Tenerife	Interinsular Preferente de Santa Cruz de Tenerife (Tenerife) (3 groups) (FTF)	Primera Interinsular (2 groups): Primera Insular La Palma	Segunda Interinsular (2 groups): Segunda Insular-El Hierro; Segunda Insular-La Gomera	—N/a	
Region of Murcia (FFRM)		Territorial Preferente	Liga Autonómica	Primera Territorial	—N/a	
Extremadura (FEF)		Primera Regional (4 subgroups)	Segunda Regional (5 subgroups)	—N/a		
Navarre (FNF)		Primera Autonómica	Preferente (2 groups)	Primera Regional (3 groups)	—N/a	
La Rioja (FRF)		Regional Preferente de La Rioja	—N/a			
Aragon (FAF)		Regional Preferente (2 groups)	Primera Regional (4 groups)	Segunda Regional (5 groups)	Segunda Regional B	Tercera Regional (3 groups)
Castile-La Mancha (FFCM)		Primera División Preferente (2 groups)	Primera División Autonómica (4 groups)	Segunda División Autonómica (6 groups)	—N/a	
Ceuta (FFC)		Regional Preferente de Ceuta	—N/a			
Melilla (FMF)		Primera Autonómica de Melilla	—N/a			
