= List of Getafe CF seasons =

This is a list of seasons played by Getafe CF in Spanish and European football, from its foundation in 1899 to the most recent completed season. It details the country achievements in major competitions, and the top scorers in league games for each season.

The club has been runners-up in the Copa del Rey twice, and played in the UEFA Cup / Europa League three times.

== Key ==
Key to league record:

- Pos = Final position
- Pld = Matches played
- W = Matches won
- D = Matches drawn
- L = Matches lost
- GF = Goals for
- GA = Goals against
- Pts = Points

Key to divisions:

- 1ª = La Liga
- 2ª = Segunda División
- 2ª B = Segunda División B
- 3ª = Tercera División
- 1ª Reg. = Primera Regional
- 2ª Reg. = Segunda Regional
- Pref. = Preferente Regional

Key to rounds:

- W = Winners
- RU = Runners-up
- SF = Semi-finals
- QF = Quarter-finals
- R16 = Round of 16
- R32 = Round of 32
- R64 = Round of 64
- R6 = Sixth round
- R5 = Fifth round
- R4 = Fourth round
- R3 = Third round
- R2 = Second round
- R1 = First round
- GS = Group stage

| Winners | Runners-up | Promoted | Promotion playoffs | Relegation playoffs | Relegated |

== Seasons ==
| Season | League | Pos | Pld | W | D | L | GF | GA | Pts | Copa del Rey | Europe | | Notes |
|---|---|---|---|---|---|---|---|---|---|---|---|---|---|
| 1983–84 | 2ª Reg. | 1st | 34 | 30 | 2 | 2 | 133 | 21 | 62 | | | | |
| 1984–85 | 1ª Reg. | 1st | 34 | 26 | 7 | 1 | 118 | 20 | 59 | | | | |
| 1985–86 | Pref. | 1st | 34 | 23 | 10 | 1 | 90 | 28 | 56 | | | | |
| 1986–87 | 3ª | 6th | 38 | 17 | 10 | 11 | 63 | 45 | 44 | | | | Promoted due to league expansion |
| 1987–88 | 2ª B | 3rd | 38 | 18 | 11 | 9 | 71 | 41 | 47 | Fourth round | | | |
| 1988–89 | 2ª B | 6th | 38 | 16 | 11 | 11 | 52 | 36 | 43 | First round | | | |
| 1989–90 | 2ª B | 2nd | 38 | 18 | 15 | 5 | 54 | 30 | 51 | | | | |
| 1990–91 | 2ª B | 4th | 38 | 16 | 13 | 9 | 45 | 24 | 45 | Fourth round | | | |
| 1991–92 | 2ª B | 6th | 38 | 17 | 11 | 10 | 56 | 35 | 45 | Fifth round | | | |
| 1992–93 | 2ª B | 4th | 38 | 15 | 17 | 6 | 42 | 28 | 47 | Third round | | | |
| 1993–94 | 2ª B | 2nd | 38 | 17 | 16 | 5 | 53 | 31 | 50 | Fourth round | | | |
| 1994–95 | 2ª | 18th | 38 | 5 | 20 | 13 | 26 | 42 | 30 | Third round | | | Relegation reversed due to league expansion |
| 1995–96 | 2ª | 19th | 38 | 7 | 11 | 20 | 30 | 52 | 32 | Second round | | | |
| 1996–97 | 2ª B | 16th | 38 | 12 | 9 | 17 | 44 | 54 | 45 | First round | | | |
| 1997–98 | 2ª B | 7th | 38 | 17 | 6 | 15 | 45 | 40 | 57 | | | | |
| 1998–99 | 2ª B | 1st | 38 | 21 | 9 | 8 | 50 | 23 | 72 | | | | |
| 1999–2000 | 2ª | 19th | 42 | 13 | 9 | 20 | 39 | 51 | 48 | Second round | | | |
| 2000–01 | 2ª | 21st | 42 | 8 | 11 | 23 | 42 | 65 | 35 | First round | | | |
| 2001–02 | 2ª B | 5th | 38 | 17 | 10 | 11 | 48 | 37 | 61 | First round | | | |
| 2002–03 | 2ª | 11th | 42 | 13 | 14 | 15 | 52 | 55 | 53 | Second round | | | |
| 2003–04 | 2ª | 2nd | 42 | 20 | 16 | 6 | 55 | 38 | 76 | First round | | | |
| 2004–05 | 1ª | 13th | 38 | 12 | 11 | 15 | 38 | 46 | 47 | Round of 16 | | | |
| 2005–06 | 1ª | 9th | 38 | 15 | 9 | 14 | 54 | 49 | 54 | Round of 16 | | | |
| 2006–07 | 1ª | 9th | 38 | 14 | 10 | 14 | 39 | 33 | 52 | Runners-up | | | |
| 2007–08 | 1ª | 14th | 38 | 12 | 11 | 15 | 44 | 48 | 47 | Runners-up | UEFA Cup | QF | |
| 2008–09 | 1ª | 17th | 38 | 10 | 12 | 16 | 50 | 56 | 42 | Round of 16 | | | |
| 2009–10 | 1ª | 6th | 38 | 17 | 7 | 14 | 58 | 48 | 58 | Semi-finals | | | |
| 2010–11 | 1ª | 16th | 38 | 12 | 8 | 18 | 49 | 60 | 44 | Round of 16 | Europa League | GS | |
| 2011–12 | 1ª | 11th | 38 | 12 | 11 | 15 | 40 | 51 | 47 | Round of 32 | | | |
| 2012–13 | 1ª | 10th | 38 | 13 | 8 | 17 | 43 | 57 | 47 | Round of 16 | | | |
| 2013–14 | 1ª | 13th | 38 | 11 | 9 | 18 | 35 | 54 | 42 | Round of 16 | | | |
| 2014–15 | 1ª | 15th | 38 | 10 | 7 | 21 | 33 | 64 | 37 | Quarter-finals | | | |
| 2015–16 | 1ª | 19th | 38 | 9 | 9 | 20 | 37 | 67 | 36 | Round of 32 | | | |
| 2016–17 | 2ª | 3rd | 42 | 18 | 14 | 10 | 55 | 43 | 68 | Second round | | | |
| 2017–18 | 1ª | 8th | 38 | 15 | 10 | 13 | 42 | 33 | 55 | Round of 32 | | | |
| 2018–19 | 1ª | 5th | 38 | 15 | 14 | 9 | 48 | 35 | 59 | Quarter-finals | | | |
| 2019–20 | 1ª | 8th | 38 | 14 | 12 | 12 | 43 | 37 | 54 | Second round | Europa League | R16 | |
| 2020–21 | 1ª | 15th | 38 | 9 | 11 | 18 | 28 | 43 | 38 | Second round | | | |
| 2021–22 | 1ª | 15th | 38 | 8 | 15 | 15 | 33 | 41 | 39 | Second round | | | |
| 2022–23 | 1ª | 15th | 38 | 10 | 12 | 16 | 34 | 45 | 42 | Round of 32 | | | |
| 2023–24 | 1ª | 12th | 38 | 10 | 13 | 15 | 42 | 54 | 43 | Round of 16 | | | |
| 2024–25 | 1ª | 13th | 38 | 11 | 9 | 18 | 34 | 39 | 42 | Quarter-finals | | | |
| 2025–26 | 1ª | 7th | 38 | 15 | 6 | 17 | 32 | 38 | 51 | Round of 32 | | | |
