= Spanish football league system =

Interrelations of club association football leagues in Spain

- Country: Spain
- Sport: Association football
- Promotion and relegation: Yes

National system
- Federation: Royal Spanish Football Federation
- Confederation: UEFA
- Top division: Men: Primera División; Women: Liga F
- Second division: Segunda División
- Cup competition: Men: Copa del Rey; Spanish Supercup; Women: Copa de la Reina

Regional systems
- Federations: Andalusia; Aragon; Asturias; Balearic Islands; Basque Country; Canary Islands; Cantabria; Castile and Leon; Castilla–La Mancha; Catalonia; Ceuta; Community of Madrid; Extremadura; Galicia; La Rioja; Melilla; Region of Murcia; Navarre; Valencian Community

The Spanish football league system consists of several professional, semi-professional, amateur and non-professional leagues bound together hierarchically by promotion and relegation.

The top two tiers of the male league pyramid — Primera División (a.k.a. La Liga) and Segunda División (a.k.a. La Liga 2) — are administered by the Liga Nacional de Fútbol Profesional, a sports association with independent legal status from the Royal Spanish Football Federation (RFEF), the governing body of football in Spain.

Conversely, the top tiers of the women's pyramid (Liga F), second and third tier of the women's pyramid, (Primera Federación and Segunda Federación) are administered by the RFEF.

The lower tiers (6th and below for the men's pyramid; 5th and below for the female one) are run by the regional federations.

In addition to clubs from Spain, and under the purview of the additional provision 17 of the 1990 Law of Sport, Andorran clubs affiliated to a Spanish regional federation are allowed to compete in the system.

The RFEF allows reserve teams to compete in the main league system, as is the case in most European domestic leagues.

However, reserve teams are not allowed to compete in the same tier as their senior team, and no reserve team has thus competed in the top flight.

== Men ==
=== La Liga ===
La Liga is the highest level in the Spanish football league system and is operated by the Liga Nacional de Fútbol Profesional.

=== Other professional divisions ===
Segunda División, also called La Liga 2 is the second highest level in the Spanish football league system and is also operated by the Liga Nacional de Fútbol Profesional.

=== Professional & Semi-Professional divisions ===
The Royal Spanish Football Federation (RFEF) created a new tier to begin in the 2021–22 season placed between the Segunda División and the former Segunda División B which had been created in 1977. The federation officially named the third tier, containing two regionalised groups, the Primera Federación.

Below the new Primera División RFEF sits the fourth tier, the Segunda Federación, roughly corresponding to the format of Segunda B, other than that the new format has five regionalized groups. In contrast, the old system contained only four, other than in its final season, 2020–21, unique both due to the transition into the new system and complications caused by the COVID-19 pandemic in Spain which led to more teams being included and a complicated format involving 10 localized leagues half the size of the usual groups, followed by 15 sections to determine which teams would go into the second, third, fourth and fifth levels.

Following the reorganization, the Tercera Federación is the fifth highest level in the Spanish football league system and is operated by the RFEF and 17 regional federations corresponding to each of the autonomous communities of Spain (there are 18 groups – Andalusia is divided into two due to its size). Prior to 2021, this was known as the Tercera División and was the fourth level, but had the same format. In 2020–21 the division also had an atypical form of 36 local subgroups followed by a total of 50 subgroups to allocate promotion, playoff, and relegation places.

=== Lower divisions ===
From level 6, each of the RFEF's 19 regional federations runs its regional league pyramid under its own jurisdiction.

== Pyramid table ==
Level	League(s)/Division(s)																	
	Professional leagues																	
1	Primera División (LaLiga EA Sports); 20 teams																	
	↓↑ 3 teams																	
2	Segunda División (LaLiga Hypermotion); 22 teams																	
	↓↑ 4 teams																	
	Semi-professional leagues																	
3	Primera Federación; 40 clubs divided into 2 groups																	
3	Group 1; 20 clubs									Group 2; 20 clubs								
	↓↑ 10 teams																	
4	Segunda Federación; 90 clubs divided into 5 groups																	
4	Group 1; 18 clubs				Group 2; 18 clubs			Group 3; 18 clubs				Group 4; 18 clubs			Group 5; 18 clubs			
	↓↑ 27 teams																	
5	Tercera Federación; 324 clubs divided into 18 groups																	
5	Group 1; 18 clubs	Group 2; 18 clubs	Group 3; 18 clubs	Group 4; 18 clubs	Group 5; 18 clubs	Group 6; 18 clubs	Group 7; 18 clubs	Group 8; 18 clubs	Group 9; 18 clubs	Group 10; 18 clubs	Group 11; 18 clubs	Group 12; 18 clubs	Group 13; 18 clubs	Group 14; 18 clubs	Group 15; 18 clubs	Group 16; 18 clubs	Group 17; 18 clubs	Group 18; 18 clubs
	↓↑ 54 teams																	
	Non-professional leagues																	
6	1st Regional Division																	
7	2nd Regional Division																	
8	3rd Regional Division																	
9	4th Regional Division																	
10	5th Regional Division																	

=== Evolution of the Spanish league system ===
Tier\Years	1929	1929–34	1934–36	1936–39	1939–40	1940–77	1977–2021	Since 2021
1	Primera División			Spanish Civil War	Primera División (Note: The Primera and Segunda was founded by the Royal Spanish Football Association, but since 1984 is operated by the Liga Nacional de Fútbol Profesional. Since 2023, the Primera División is commonly known as LaLiga EA Sports and the Segunda División is commonly known as LaLiga Hypermotion for sponsorship reasons.)			
2	Segunda División Group A	Segunda División		Spanish Civil War	Segunda División			
3	Segunda División Group B	3ª División	None (Note: From 1929 to 1940 the Spanish pyramid was similar to the Brazilian system, with two simultaneous and independent pyramids: the national pyramid, and the regional pyramid.)	Spanish Civil War	None	3ª División (Note: Tercera División was not played in the 1941–42 and 1942–43 seasons.)	Segunda División B	Primera Federación
4	None	None	None	Spanish Civil War	None	Lower	Tercera División	Segunda Federación
5	None	None	None	Spanish Civil War	None	Lower	Lower	Tercera Federación
6	None	None	None	Spanish Civil War	None	Lower	Lower	Lower
7	None	None	None	Spanish Civil War	None	Lower	Lower	Lower
8	None	None	None	Spanish Civil War	None	Lower	Lower	Lower
9	None	None	None	Spanish Civil War	None	Lower	Lower	Lower
10	None	None	None	Spanish Civil War	None	Lower	Lower	Lower

== Women ==
=== Since 2023–24 ===
Level	League
	Professional league
1	Liga F (finetwork Liga F); 16 teams
	↓↑ 2 teams
2	Primera Federación; 14 teams
	↓↑ 4 teams
3	Segunda Federación; 32 teams divided into 2 groups
	↓↑ 6 teams
4	Primera Nacional; 6 groups, 14 teams each
5	Regional leagues

== Youth ==
Level	League
1	División de Honor (7 groups)
2	Liga Nacional Juvenil (21 groups)
3	Divisiones regionales
