= Divisiones Regionales de Fútbol in Aragon =

The Divisiones Regionales de Fútbol in the Community of Aragon, organized by l the Aragon Football Federation:

- Regional Preferente, 2 Groups of 18 teams (Level 6 of the Spanish football pyramid)
- Primera Regional, 4 Groups of 18 teams (Level 7)
- Segunda Regional, 5 Groups of 18 teams (Level 8)
- Segunda Regional B, 1 Group of 18 teams (Level 9)
- Tercera Regional, 3 Groups of 18 teams (Level 10)

== League chronology ==
Timeline

== Regional Preferente ==
Regional Preferente
- Founded: Unknown
- Country: Spain
- Number of clubs: 2 groups of 18 teams each.
- Level on pyramid: 6
- Promotion to: 3ª Federación – Group 17
- Relegation to: Primera Regional
- Domestic cup: None
- Website: futbolaragon.com

Regional Preferente is the sixth level of competition of the Spanish football league system in the Community of Aragón.

=== 2019–20 season teams ===
Group I	Group II
San Lorenzo; Sabiñánigo; Casetas; Delicias; Santa Anastasia; Biescas; Mallén; Tardienta; Mequinenza; Actur Pablo Iglesias; Peña Ferranca; Magallón; Zaragoza 2014; Zuera; Peñas Oscenses; Peña Fragatina; Huesca B; Villa de Alagón	La Almunia; Épila; Cariñena; Caspe; Alcañiz; San José; Utrillas; Andorra; Quinto; Montecarlo; At. Calatayud; Fuentes; Herrera; Cella; Morata; Alcorisa; Alfindén; Calatorao

=== Champions ===
Season	Gr. I	Gr. II
2018–19	Cuarte	Fraga
2017–18	Villanueva C.F.	A.D. San Juan
2016–17	C.D. Caspe	C.D. La Almunia
2015–16	C.D. Robres	C.F. Épila
2014–15	U.D. Fraga	C.D. Cariñena
2013–14	C.D. Binéfar	R.S.D. Santa Isabel

== Primera Regional ==
Primera Regional
- Founded: Unknown
- Country: Spain
- Number of clubs: 4 groups of 18 teams
- Level on pyramid: 7
- Promotion to: Regional Preferente
- Relegation to: Segunda Regional
- Domestic cup: None
- Website: futbolaragon.com

Primera Regional is the seventh level of competition of the Spanish football league system in the Community of Aragón.

== Segunda Regional ==
Segunda Regional
- Founded: Unknown
- Country: Spain
- Number of clubs: 5 groups (unknown teams)
- Level on pyramid: 8
- Promotion to: Primera Regional
- Relegation to: Segunda Regional B
- Domestic cup: None
- Website: futbolaragon.com

Segunda Regional is the 8th level of competition of the Spanish football league system in the Community of Aragón.

== Segunda Regional B ==
Segunda Regional B
- Founded: Unknown
- Country: Spain
- Number of clubs: One group of 18 teams
- Level on pyramid: 9
- Promotion to: Segunda Regional
- Relegation to: Tercera Regional
- Domestic cup: None
- Website: futbolaragon.com

Segunda Regional B is the 9th level of competition of the Spanish football league system in the Community of Aragón.

== Tercera Regional ==
Tercera Regional
- Founded: Unknown
- Country: Spain
- Number of clubs: Two groups of 17 teams
- Level on pyramid: 10
- Promotion to: Segunda Regional B
- Relegation to: None
- Domestic cup: None
- Website: futbolaragon.com

Tercera Regional is the tenth level of competition of the Spanish football league system in the Community of Aragón.
