= Sito (footballer, born 1996) =

Spanish footballer

Personal information
- Full name: Andrés Pascual Santonja
- Date of birth: 18 November 1996 (age 29)
- Place of birth: Alcoy, Spain
- Height: 1.80 m (5 ft 11 in)
- Position: Winger

Team information
- Current team: Intercity
- Number: 21

Youth career
- Vedruna
- Alcoyano
- 2005–2015: Valencia

Senior career*
Years	Team	Apps	(Gls)
2014–2019	Valencia B	87	(12)
2016–2018	Valencia	2	(0)
2017–2018	→ Lorca (loan)	9	(0)
2019–2024	Asteras Tripolis	130	(7)
2024–	Intercity	48	(3)
- * Club domestic league appearances and goals as of 16 May 2026

Andrés Pascual Santonja (born 18 November 1996), commonly known as Sito, is a Spanish professional footballer who plays for Spanish club Intercity mainly as a left winger.

== Career ==
Born in Alcoy, Alicante, Valencian Community, Sito joined Valencia CF's youth setup after spells at CD Vedruna and CD Alcoyano. On 29 March 2014, while still a junior, he made his debut with the former's reserve team in a 0–0 Segunda División B home draw against Elche CF Ilicitano.

On 13 April 2014, Sito scored his first senior goal, netting the first in a 3–0 home win against Huracán Valencia CF. He was definitely promoted to the B-team in July 2014, but appeared rarely during the campaign.

On 13 May 2016, Sito made his first team – and La Liga – debut, coming on as a late substitute for Pablo Piatti in a 0–1 home loss against Real Sociedad. On 8 August of the following year, he was loaned to Segunda División side Lorca FC, for one year.

On 4 January 2017, Sito cut ties with Lorca and subsequently returned to Valencia and its B-team. On 6 August 2019, he terminated his contract with the Che and moved abroad, joining a host of compatriots at Greek side Asteras Tripolis.

== Career statistics ==
As of match played 27 November 2021

Appearances and goals by club, season and competition
Club	Season	League			Copa del Rey		Other		Total	
Club	Season	Division	Apps	Goals	Apps	Goals	Apps	Goals	Apps	Goals
Valencia II	2013–14	Segunda División B	5	1	—		—		5	1
Valencia II	2014–15	Segunda División B	5	0	—		—		5	0
Valencia II	2015–16	Segunda División B	19	4	—		—		19	4
Valencia II	2016–17	Segunda División B	26	2	—		—		26	2
Valencia II	2017–18	Segunda División B	10	3	—		—		10	3
Valencia II	2018–19	Segunda División B	22	2	—		—		22	2
Valencia II	Total		87	12	0	0	0	0	87	12
Valencia	2015–16	La Liga	1	0	0	0	0	0	1	0
Valencia	2016–17	La Liga	1	0	0	0	0	0	1	0
Valencia	Total		2	0	0	0	0	0	2	0
Lorca (loan)	2017–18	Segunda División	9	0	0	0	—		9	0
Asteras Tripolis	2019–20	Super League Greece	23	2	2	0	—		25	2
Asteras Tripolis	2020–21	Super League Greece	33	1	2	0	—		35	1
Asteras Tripolis	2021–22	Super League Greece	11	1	1	0	—		12	1
Career total			165	16	5	0	0	0	170	16
