= Salva Ruiz =

Spanish footballer

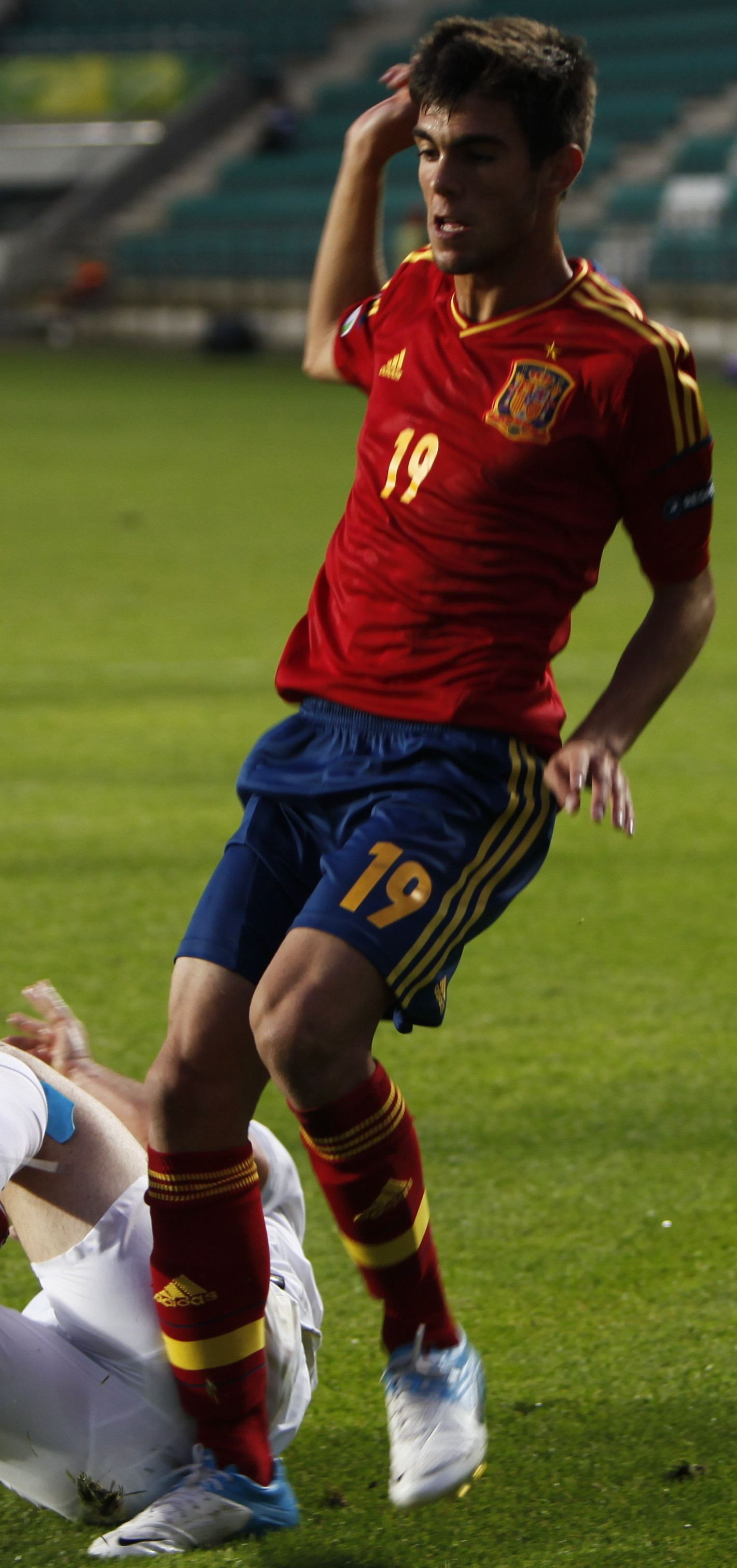
- Ruiz playing for Spain U19 in 2012

Personal information
- Full name: Salvador Ruiz Rodríguez
- Date of birth: 17 May 1995 (age 31)
- Place of birth: Albal, Spain
- Height: 1.75 m (5 ft 9 in)
- Position: Left-back

Team information
- Current team: Huesca

Youth career
- Valencia

Senior career*
Years	Team	Apps	(Gls)
2011–2017	Valencia B	98	(2)
2012–2017	Valencia	0	(0)
2013–2014	→ Tenerife (loan)	5	(0)
2015–2016	→ Granada (loan)	2	(0)
2018–2019	Mallorca	19	(0)
2019	Valencia	0	(0)
2019	→ Mallorca (loan)	8	(0)
2019–2021	Deportivo La Coruña	41	(0)
2021–2026	Castellón	120	(4)
2026–	Huesca	0	(0)

International career
2011	Spain U16	6	(0)
2010–2011	Spain U17	5	(0)
2012–2014	Spain U19	5	(0)
2012	Spain U20	4	(0)
- * Club domestic league appearances and goals as of 30 June 2026

Salvador "Salva" Ruiz Rodríguez (born 17 May 1995) is a Spanish professional footballer who plays as a left-back for SD Huesca.

== Club career ==
Born in Albal, Valencian Community, Ruiz was a product of Valencia CF's youth system. He made his senior debut with the reserves when he was only 16, playing 19 Segunda División B games in 2011–12 and scoring one goal, in the 2–0 home win against CE Manacor. He appeared in his first official match with the first team on 28 November 2012, featuring the full 90 minutes in the 3–1 home win over UE Llagostera in that season's Copa del Rey.

Ruiz was loaned out to CD Tenerife for the 2013–14 campaign. He made his first Segunda División appearance on 25 August, starting and being replaced in a 0–0 home draw with Hércules CF.

On 13 July 2015, after a further two full seasons with Valencia B, Ruiz was loaned to Granada CF in a season-long deal. He made his debut in La Liga on 24 August, being sent off in the 56th minute of an eventual 1–3 home loss to SD Eibar.

After being diagnosed with aplastic anemia, Ruiz was inactive for more than one year. On 10 January 2018, he signed a one-and-a-half-year contract with RCD Mallorca.

On 7 February 2019, Valencia activated their buy-back clause on Ruiz's contract; the player agreed a deal until June 2023, remaining on loan at Mallorca until the end of the season. On 2 September, however, he joined Deportivo de La Coruña of the second division for three years.

On 25 July 2021, Ruiz agreed to a three-year contract with Primera División RFEF side CD Castellón. He renewed his link until 2026 on 19 December 2023, and helped the club in their promotion to the second division at the end of the season.

On 22 June 2026, the Orelluts announced Ruiz's departure as his contract was due to expire. On 23 July, he signed a two-year deal with SD Huesca in the third tier.

== Career statistics ==
As of match played 14 March 2021

Appearances and goals by club, season and competition
Club	Season	League			National Cup		Other		Total	
Club	Season	Division	Apps	Goals	Apps	Goals	Apps	Goals	Apps	Goals
Valencia	2012–13	La Liga	0	0	1	0	—		1	0
Valencia	2013–14	La Liga	0	0	0	0	—		0	0
Valencia	2014–15	La Liga	0	0	0	0	—		0	0
Valencia	2016–17	La Liga	0	0	0	0	—		0	0
Valencia	Total		0	0	1	0	0	0	1	0
Tenerife (loan)	2013–14	Segunda División	5	0	1	0	—		6	0
Granada (loan)	2015–16	La Liga	2	0	2	0	—		4	0
Mallorca	2017–18	Segunda División B	9	0	0	0	2 (Note: Appearance(s) in Promotion Playoffs)	0	11	0
Mallorca	2018–19	Segunda División	11	0	0	0	0	0	11	0
Mallorca	Total		20	0	0	0	2	0	22	0
Valencia	2018–19	La Liga	0	0	0	0	—		0	0
Mallorca (loan)	2018–19	Segunda División	8	0	0	0	—		8	0
Mallorca (loan)	Total Mallorca		28	0	0	0	2	0	30	0
Deportivo La Coruña	2019–20	Segunda División	25	0	1	0	—		26	0
Deportivo La Coruña	2020–21	Segunda División B	12	0	1	0	—		13	0
Deportivo La Coruña	Total		37	0	2	0	0	0	39	0
Career total			72	0	6	0	2	0	80	0

== Honours ==
Mallorca

- Segunda División B: 2017–18

Spain U19

- UEFA European Under-19 Championship: 2012
