= Ibrahim Diallo (footballer) =

Malian footballer (born 1996)

Personal information
- Full name: Ibrahim Diallo
- Date of birth: 12 August 1996 (age 30)
- Place of birth: Sikasso, Mali
- Height: 1.76 m (5 ft 9 1/2 in)
- Position: Centre back

Youth career
- Aspire

Senior career*
| Years | Team | Apps | (Gls) |
| 2014–2015 | Eupen | 18 | (0) |
| 2015–2016 | Valencia B | 41 | (0) |
| 2015–2016 | Valencia | 0 | (0) |
| 2016–2020 | Eupen | 31 | (0) |

International career
| 2011 | Mali U20 | 1 | (0) |
- * Club domestic league appearances and goals as of 22 October 2017

Ibrahim Diallo (born 12 August 1996) is a Malian footballer who played as a central defender.

== Club career ==
An Aspire Academy youth graduate, Sikasso-born Diallo joined K.A.S. Eupen in July 2014. He made his senior debut on 3 September of that year, starting in a 3–1 home win against SC Eendracht Aalst for the Belgian Second Division.

On 30 January 2015, having featured regularly during the first part of the season, Diallo signed with Valencia CF and was assigned to its reserve team, in Segunda División B. He made his first-team debut on 2 December, starting in a 3–1 away victory over Barakaldo CF in the round of 32 of the Copa del Rey.

On 20 July 2016, Diallo rejoined Eupen. His first game in top-flight football took place ten days later, when he played the entire 0–3 away loss to S.V. Zulte Waregem for the Belgian First Division A. After suffering a knee injury in 2017 he remained under contract at Eupen but never played again, officially retiring in July 2020.

== International career ==
Diallo represented Mali at the 2011 African Youth Championship.
