= Las Palmas Inter-Island Football Federation =

- Abbreviation: FIFLP
- Purpose: Football Association
- Headquarters: Las Palmas
- Location: Canary Islands, Spain
- President: Antonio Suárez Santana
- Website: www.fiflp.com

The Las Palmas Inter-Island Football Federation (Spanish: Federación Interinsular de Fútbol de Las Palmas; FIFLP) is the football association responsible for all competitions of any form of football developed in the province of Las Palmas. It is integrated into the Royal Spanish Football Federation by way of the Canarian Football Federation and its headquarters are located in Las Palmas. It also has a delegation in Lanzarote and Fuerteventura. It is chaired by Antonio Suárez Santana.

== See also ==
- List of Spanish regional football federations
