= Summer of Champions =

- Founded: 2010
- Teams: Varies (18 in 2012)
- Website: Summer of Champions

The Summer of Champions is an annual set of pre-season fixtures normally held between German football clubs and other European football clubs.

Although trophies can be awarded to the winner of certain matches (example: Chevrolet Cup for Hannover 96 vs. Manchester United) there is no tournament winner. All matches are friendlies and the only thing to link them is that they are organised by the same company.

== History ==
The Summer of Champions was founded in 2010, by Sportfive's subsidiary, "The Sports Promoters". The 2010 edition featured 5 German clubs (1.FC Kaiserslautern, Hannover 96, Eintracht Frankfurt, Hamburger SV, and Borussia Dortmund), 3 English clubs (Liverpool F.C., Chelsea FC, and Manchester City), and 1 Spanish club (Valencia CF). The 2011 edition featured a match which didn't include a German side, but was played in Bochum, Germany. The 2012 edition featured a match which didn't include any German side, and was played outside Germany. Also, since 2012 it was hosted the Summer of Champions' Cup in Bucharest, Romania.

== Year-by-Year ==
Summer of Champions

• 2010 • 2011 • 2012

Summer of Champions' Cups

• 2012 • 2013

== Participants ==
Flag	Club	Years
(Germany)	Hannover 96	2010, 2011, 2012
(Germany)	Hamburger SV	2010, 2011, 2012
(Spain)	Valencia CF	2010, 2011, 2012
(Germany)	Eintracht Frankfurt	2010, 2012
(Germany)	Hertha BSC	2011, 2012
(England)	Aston Villa	2012
(England)	Norwich City	2012
(Romania)	FC Dinamo Bucuresti	2012
(Germany)	Borussia Mönchengladbach	2012
(Spain)	Sevilla FC	2012
(England)	Manchester United	2012
(Italy)	Juventus	2012
(Germany)	Dynamo Dresden	2012
(Germany)	SV Werder Bremen	2012
(Germany)	Eintracht Braunschweig	2012
(England)	West Ham United	2012
(Spain)	FC Barcelona	2012
(Netherlands)	Ajax Amsterdam	2011
(Italy)	Internazionale	2011
(Turkey)	Galatasaray S.K.	2011
(France)	Lyon	2011
(Germany)	1. FC Nürnberg	2011
(Spain)	Real Madrid	2011
(Germany)	VfL Wolfsburg	2011
(Spain)	Villarreal CF	2011
(England)	Chelsea FC	2010
(Germany)	Borussia Dortmund	2010
(Germany)	1. FC Kaiserslautern	2010
(England)	Liverpool F.C.	2010
(England)	Manchester City	2010

== See also ==
- Summer of Champions' Cup
