= Tenerife Inter-Island Football Federation =

- Abbreviation: FIFT
- Formation: 1937
- Purpose: Football Association
- Headquarters: Santa Cruz de Tenerife
- Location: Canary Islands, Spain
- President: Alejandro Morales Mansito
- Website: www.ftf.es

The Tenerife Inter-Island Football Federation (Spanish: Federación Interinsular de Fútbol de Tenerife; FIFT) is the football association responsible for all competitions of any form of football developed in the province of Santa Cruz de Tenerife. It is integrated into the Royal Spanish Football Federation by way of the Canarian Football Federation and its headquarters are located in Santa Cruz de Tenerife. It also has a delegation in other municipalities of the Tenerife island and in the La Palma, La Gomera and El Hierro islands.

== See also ==
- List of Spanish regional football federations
