= Albal =

- Municipality
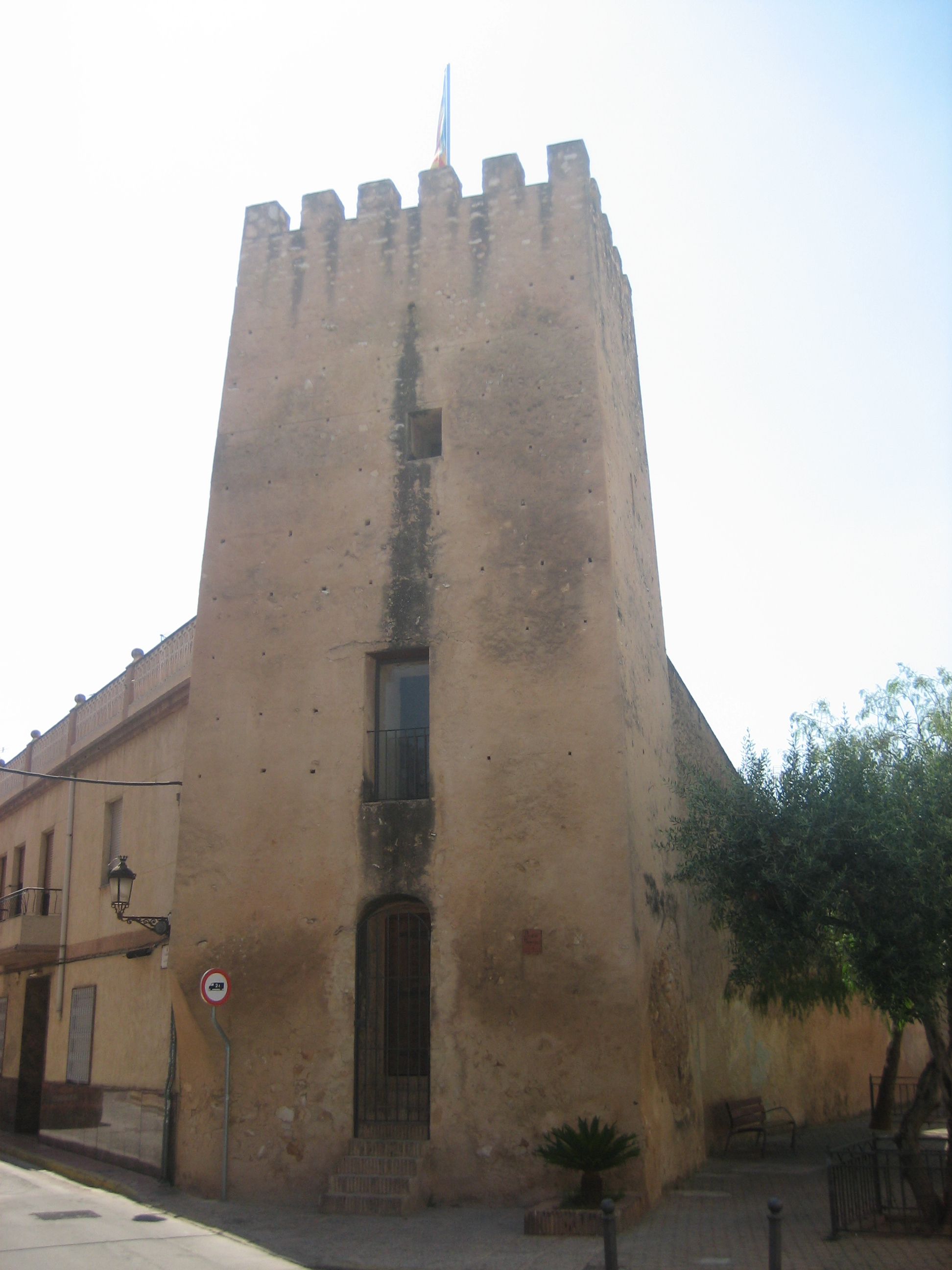

- Coat of arms

- Location in Spain
- Coordinates: 39°23′50″N 0°24′56″W
- Country: Spain
- Autonomous community: Valencian Community
- Province: Valencia
- Comarca: Horta Sud
- Judicial district: Catarroja
- Founded: 13 October 1244

Government
  - Alcalde: José Miguel Ferris

Area
  - Total: 7.37 km^{2} (2.85 sq mi)
- Elevation: 15 m (49 ft)

Population (2025-01-01)
  - Total: 17,365
  - Density: 2,360/km^{2} (6,100/sq mi)
- Demonyms: Albalenc, albalenca
- Time zone: UTC+1 (CET)
  - Summer (DST): UTC+2 (CEST)
- Postal code: 46470
- Official language(s): Valencian
- Website: Official website

Albal is a municipality in the comarca of Horta Sud in the Valencian Community, Spain.

The municipality borders Catarroja, Beniparrell, Silla, Valencia and Alcacer.

The climate is mediterranean, so winters are mild and summers are pretty warm.

The origin of Albal is at the time the Muslims governed this part of Spain. Its name comes from 'Dry land' in Arab language.

Population (2016): 16136.

Economy: Industries of plastics, furniture, agriculture and construction of buildings.

Famous buildings: Arab tower (rectangular tower of the former system of defense, around XIII century), Ermita de Santa Ana (small church with the image of Saint Ann, the grandmother of Virgin Mary, built in XIV century), Iglesia Nuestra señora de los Ángeles (main church of the town, built in 1697)

== See also ==
- List of municipalities in Valencia
