= Royal Aragonese Football Federation =

Governing body for football in Aragon, Spain

- Abbreviation: RFAF
- Formation: 1922
- Purpose: Football Association
- Location: Zaragoza, Spain
- President: Óscar Fle Latorre
- Website: www.futbolaragon.com

The Royal Aragonese Football Federation (Spanish: Real Federación Aragonesa de Fútbol; RFAF) is the governing body of the sport of football in Aragon, Spain. The RFAF organises Group 17 of the Tercera Federación, with the assistance of the Royal Spanish Football Federation (RFEF), as part of the Spanish football league system. It also organises the regional divisions.

== Competitions ==
- Men's
  - Tercera Federación (Group 17)
  - Regional Preferente
  - Primera Regional
  - Segunda Regional
  - Segunda Regional B
  - Tercera Regional
- Youth
  - Liga Nacional Juvenil Group VI
  - Divisiones Regionales
- Women's
  - Divisiones Regionales

== See also ==
- Spanish football league system
- Aragon official football team
