= Canarian Football Federation =

Football association of the Canary Islands

- Abbreviation: FCF
- Formation: 1925
- Headquarters: Santa Cruz de Tenerife
- Location: Canary Islands, Spain
- President: Juan Padrón Morales
- Website: www.federacioncanariafutbol.es

The Canarian Football Federation (Spanish: Federación Canaria de Fútbol; FCF) is the football association responsible for all competitions of any form of football developed in the Canary Islands. It is integrated into the Royal Spanish Football Federation and its headquarters are located in Santa Cruz de Tenerife.

The federation is articulated into two other federations: the Las Palmas Inter-Island Football Federation (Federación Interinsular de Fútbol de Las Palmas) and the Tenerife Inter-Island Football Federation (Federación Interinsular de Fútbol de Tenerife).

== Competitions ==
- Men's
  - Tercera Federación (Group 12)
  - Interinsular Preferente (2 groups: Las Palmas and Tenerife)
  - Primera Regional Aficionado (3 groups: Gran Canaria, Fuerteventura and Lanzarote) and Primera Interinsular (2 groups: Tenerife and La Palma)
  - Segunda Regional Aficionado (Gran Canaria), Segunda Interinsular (Tenerife), Segunda Insular-El Hierro and Segunda Insular-La Gomera
- Youth
  - Canarias Preferente (5 groups: Tenerife, La Palma, Gran Canaria, Lanzarote and Fuerteventura)
  - Divisiones Regionales
- Women's
  - Divisiones Regionales

== See also ==
- Canary Islands autonomous football team
- List of Spanish regional football federations
