= 2013–14 Valencia CF season =

Valencia
2013–14 season
- Owner: Peter Lim
- President: Amadeo Salvo
- Head coach: Miroslav Đukić (until 16 December 2013); Juan Antonio Pizzi (from 26 December 2013)
- Stadium: Mestalla
- La Liga: 8th
- Copa del Rey: Round of 16
- UEFA Europa League: Semi-finals
- Top goalscorer: League: Jonas (9); All: Paco Alcácer (14)
Home colours	Away colours	Third colours

The 2013–14 season was Valencia Club de Fútbol's 96th in existence and the club's 27th consecutive season in the top flight of Spanish football.

Valencia endured its worst domestic season since 2007–08, following a serious hamstring injury to star goalkeeper Diego Alves. Contrary to the previous four seasons under the guidance of Unai Emery, Mauricio Pellegrino, Ernesto Valverde and Miroslav Đukić, Valencia's offence malfunctioned, and in December, Đukić was fired by the club, with successful former San Lorenzo coach Juan Antonio Pizzi taking over.

With Pizzi at the helm, Valencia managed to salvage some respectability by reaching the semi-finals of the UEFA Europa League, where they were eliminated by eventual champions Sevilla. Following that narrow defeat, Valencia failed to qualify to Europe for the next season for the first time since 1997–98 due to a lowly eighth-place finish in La Liga. In June 2014, the club was sold to Singaporean consortium Meriton Holdings, owned by Peter Lim.

== Season summary ==
Valencia continued its increasingly frustrating run without the league title, which was extended to ten years following a chaotic season. Coach Miroslav Đukić was fired when the side did not perform to the expected level, and the season saw a further two coaches (Nicolás Estévez and Juan Antonio Pizzi) trying to lead Valencia without much success. Under Pizzi's reign, Valencia recorded a surprise 3–2 victory over Barcelona at Camp Nou in February and a 2–2 draw against Real Madrid at the Santiago Bernabéu Stadium in May. Despite the chaos, the side managed to reach the semi-finals of the UEFA Europa League, where it lost to eventual champions Sevilla.

Another worry was the injury problems affecting goalkeeper Diego Alves, who only played in 26 of the 38 league matches.

After the season, Valencia signed Rodrigo De Paul from Racing Club for a fee of €4.6 million to help out with the goalscoring, while successful ex-Rio Ave coach Nuno Espírito Santo was appointed in the hope he could help Valencia return to winning ways. José Sevilla Álvarez, owner of Bankia, sold the club to Singaporean Peter Lim to help Valencia clear its debt.

== Players ==
The numbers are established according to the official website: www.valenciacf.com

Note: Flags indicate national team as defined under FIFA eligibility rules; some limited exceptions apply. Players may hold more than one non-FIFA nationality.

No.	Pos.	Nation	Player
1	GK	BRA	Diego Alves
2	FW	ARG	Pablo Piatti
3	DF	POR	Rúben Vezo
4	DF	SUI	Philippe Senderos
5	DF	ESP	Víctor Ruiz
6	MF	ESP	Oriol Romeu (on loan from Chelsea)
7	FW	BRA	Jonas
8	MF	ALG	Sofiane Feghouli
11	MF	MLI	Seydou Keita
12	DF	POR	João Pereira
13	GK	ESP	Vicente Guaita (2nd captain)
14	MF	ESP	Juan Bernat

No.	Pos.	Nation	Player
15	MF	ESP	Javi Fuego
16	FW	ESP	Paco Alcácer
17	FW	CHI	Eduardo Vargas (on loan from Napoli)
19	DF	ESP	Antonio Barragán
20	DF	POR	Ricardo Costa (Captain)
21	MF	ESP	Dani Parejo
22	DF	FRA	Jérémy Mathieu
24	MF	ESP	Míchel
25	FW	BRA	Vinícius Araújo
28	MF	ARG	Fede Cartabia
29	MF	ESP	Portu
31	DF	ESP	José Luis Gayà

=== From Valencia Mestalla ===
Note: Flags indicate national team as defined under FIFA eligibility rules; some limited exceptions apply. Players may hold more than one non-FIFA nationality.

No.	Pos.	Nation	Player
26	GK	ESP	Jaume Domènech
—	DF	ESP	Carlos Delgado
—	DF	ESP	Salva Ruiz

No.	Pos.	Nation	Player
—	FW	ESP	Robert
—	MF	ESP	Mario Arqués
—	DF	ESP	Alberto Tendillo

=== Out on loan ===
Note: Flags indicate national team as defined under FIFA eligibility rules; some limited exceptions apply. Players may hold more than one non-FIFA nationality.

No.	Pos.	Nation	Player
3	DF	FRA	Aly Cissokho (at Liverpool until 30 June 2014)
—	MF	ESP	Carles Gil (at Elche until 30 June 2014)
—	MF	ESP	Jonathan Viera (at Rayo Vallecano until 30 June 2014)
4	DF	FRA	Adil Rami (at Milan until 30 June 2014)
11	FW	COL	Dorlan Pabón (at São Paulo until 30 June 2015)
18	MF	MEX	Andrés Guardado (at Bayer Leverkusen until 30 June 2014)
9	FW	POR	Hélder Postiga (at Lazio until 30 June 2014)
10	MF	ARG	Éver Banega (at Newell's Old Boys until 30 June 2014)
—	DF	ARG	Nicolás Otamendi (at Atlético Mineiro until 30 June 2014)

=== Detailed squad information ===
Num	Pos	Nat	Name	Date of birth (age)	Place of birth	Date signed	Signed from	Contract expires	Int	Notes
Goalkeepers
1	GK	(Spain)	Vicente Guaita	18 February 1987 (age 39)	Torrent, Spain	2 October 2008 (d)	Youth system, signed from Aldaya	30 June 2015	Spain	Originally from youth system
13	GK	(Brazil)	Diego Alves	24 June 1985 (age 41)	Rio de Janeiro, Brazil	4 June 2011	(Brazil) São Paulo	30 June 2015		
–	GK	(Spain)	Yeray Gómez	10 June 1992 (age 34)	Selva, Spain	11 July 2013	(Spain) Mallorca B	30 June 2014		On loan from Mallorca B, Valencia Mestalla member
Defenders
4	CB	(France)	Adil Rami	27 December 1985 (age 40)	Bastia, France	3 January 2011	(France) Lille	30 June 2014	France	
5	CB	(Spain)	Víctor Ruiz	25 January 1989 (age 37)	Esplugues de Llobregat, Spain	30 August 2011	(Italy) Napoli	30 June 2016		
12	RB	(Portugal)	João Pereira	25 February 1984 (age 42)	Lisbon, Portugal	24 May 2012	(Portugal) Sporting CP	30 June 2015	Portugal	
19	RB	(Spain)	Antonio Barragán	12 June 1987 (age 39)	Pontedeume, Spain	30 August 2011	(Spain) Real Valladolid	30 June 2015		
20	CB	(Portugal)	Ricardo Costa	27 August 1981 (age 45)	Vila Nova de Gaia, Portugal	17 May 2010	(Germany) VfL Wolfsburg	30 June 2015	Portugal	
22	LB	(France)	Jérémy Mathieu	29 October 1983 (age 43)	Luxeuil-les-Bains, France	10 June 2009	(France) Toulouse	30 June 2017	France	
Midfielders
6	DM	(Spain)	Oriol Romeu	24 September 1991 (age 35)	Ulldecona, Spain	12 July 2013	(England) Chelsea	31 June 2014		On loan from Chelsea
8	AM	(Algeria)	Sofiane Feghouli	26 December 1989 (age 36)	Levallois-Perret, France	23 May 2010	(France) Grenoble	30 June 2016	Algeria	
10	CM	(Argentina)	Éver Banega	29 June 1988 (age 38)	Rosario, Argentina	5 January 2008	(Argentina) Boca Juniors	30 June 2015	Argentina	
11	LW	(Argentina)	Pablo Piatti	31 March 1989 (age 37)	Ucacha, Argentina	6 July 2011	(Spain) Almería	30 June 2016	Argentina	
14	LW	(Spain)	Juan Bernat	1 March 1993 (age 33)	Cullera, Spain	27 August 2011 (d)	Youth system, since beginnings	30 June 2015		Originally from youth system
15	DM	(Spain)	Javi Fuego	4 January 1984 (age 42)	Pola de Siero, Spain	1 July 2013	(Spain) Rayo Vallecano	30 June 2017		
17	AM	(Spain)	Jonathan Viera	21 October 1989 (age 37)	Las Palmas de G.C., Spain	6 May 2012	(Spain) Las Palmas	30 June 2017		
18	LW	(Mexico)	Andrés Guardado	28 September 1986 (age 40)	Guadalajara, Mexico	28 May 2012	(Spain) Deportivo La Coruña	30 June 2016	Mexico	
21	CM	(Spain)	Dani Parejo	16 April 1989 (age 37)	Coslada, Spain	14 June 2011	(Spain) Getafe	30 June 2016		
23	AM	(Spain)	Sergio Canales	16 February 1991 (age 35)	Santander, Spain	30 July 2011	(Spain) Real Madrid	30 June 2017		
24	AM	(Spain)	Míchel	29 July 1988 (age 38)	Burjassot, Spain	29 October 2008 (d)	(Spain) Levante	30 June 2016		Originally from youth system
Forwards
7	SS	(Brazil)	Jonas	1 April 1984 (age 42)	Bebedouro, Brazil	24 January 2011	(Brazil) Grêmio	30 June 2015	Brazil	Without European Union citizenship
16	ST	(Spain)	Paco Alcácer	30 August 1993 (age 33)	Torrent, Spain	11 November 2010 (d)	Youth system, signed from Monte-Sión	30 June 2016		

Notes: (d), debut in first team in an official match

=== Transfers ===
==== In ====
No.	Pos.	Nat.	Name	Age	EU	Moving from	Type	Transfer window	Ends	Transfer fee	Source
15	DM	(Spain)	Javi Fuego	29	EU	Rayo Vallecano	Transfer	Summer	2016	Free	As.com
16	ST	(Spain)	Paco Alcácer	19	EU	Getafe	Loan return	Summer	2016	N/A	Terra.es
5	DM	(Argentina)	Fernando Gago	26	EU	Vélez Sarsfield (Argentina)	Loan return	Summer	2016	N/A	Clarín.com
24	AM	(Spain)	Míchel	24	EU	Levante	Transfer	Summer	2016	€0.42M	Superdeporte.es
6	DM	(Spain)	Oriol Romeu	21	EU	Chelsea (England)	Loan	Summer	2014	N/A	ValenciaCF.com
	GK	(Spain)	Yeray Gómez	21	EU	Mallorca B	Loan	Summer	2014	N/A	Marca.com
28	MF	(Spain)	Fede Cartabia	20	EU	Valencia Mestalla	Promoted	Summer	2017	N/A	Superdeporte.es
36	DF	(Spain)	José Luis Gayà	18	EU	Valencia Mestalla	Promoted	Summer	2018	N/A	[]
27	FW	(Spain)	Robert	20	EU	Valencia Mestalla	Promoted	Summer	2014	N/A	Superdeporte.es
9	FW	(Portugal)	Hélder Postiga	31	EU	Zaragoza	Transfer	Summer	2016	€3M	Superdeporte.es
11	FW	(Colombia)	Dorlan Pabón	25	Non-EU	Monterrey (Mexico)	Transfer	Summer	2018	€7.5M	Superdeporte.es
17	FW	(Chile)	Eduardo Vargas	24	Non-EU	Napoli (Italy)	Loan	Winter	2014	€0.5M	Superdeporte.es

Total expenditure: ▼€11.42 million

==== Out ====
No.	Pos.	Nat.	Name	Age	EU	Moving to	Type	Transfer window	Transfer fee	Source
24	MF	(Argentina)	Tino Costa	28	EU	Spartak Moscow (Russia)	Transfer	Summer	€7M	Superdeporte.es
6	MF	(Spain)	David Albelda	35	EU		End of contract	Summer	Free	Superdeporte.es
26	GK	(Spain)	Felipe Ramos	25	EU	Deportivo La Coruña	End of loan	Summer	N/A	Riazor.org
	CM	(Spain)	Carles Gil	20	EU	Elche	Loan	Summer	N/A	ValenciaCF.com
16	ST	(Paraguay)	Nelson Valdez	29	EU	Al Jazira (United Arab Emirates)	Transfer	Summer	€3M	Marca.com
5	MF	(Argentina)	Fernando Gago	27	EU	Boca Juniors (Argentina)	Transfer	Summer	€1.7M	Superdeporte.es
9	ST	(Spain)	Roberto Soldado	27	EU	Tottenham Hotspur (England)	Transfer	Summer	€30M	ESPN
3	DF	(France)	Aly Cissokho	25	EU	Liverpool (England)	Loan	Summer	€1M	Superdeporte.es
	DF	(Spain)	Salva Ruiz	18	EU	Tenerife	Loan	Summer	N/A	Superdeporte.es

Total income: ▲€42.7 million

== Club ==
=== Technical staff ===
Position	Staff
Head coach	Juan Antonio Pizzi
Second coach	Manuel Suárez
Physical trainer	Alejandro Richino
Goalkeeping trainer	José Manuel Ochotorena
Delegate	Salvador González 'Voro'
Kit manager	Bernardo España Edo 'Españeta'
Kit manager	José Manuel López
Kit manager	Vicente Navarro Navarro 'Serreta'
Kit manager	Iván Montero Rodríguez
Kit manager	Vicente Ventura Deval

Source: Valencia CF Official Website

== Competitions ==
=== Overall ===
Competition	Started round	Current position / round	Final position / round	First match	Last match
La Liga	—	—		17 August 2013	18 May 2014
Copa del Rey	Round of 32	Round of 16		7 December 2013	
UEFA Europa League	Group stage	—		19 September 2013	

Updated to match played 9 July 2013
Source: Competitions

=== Overall friendly trophies ===
Trophy	Organizer	Type	Result	Place	First match	Last match
International Champions Cup	International Champions Cup	Tournament		Mestalla, Valencia (Spain); MetLife Stadium, NYC (United States); Sun Life Stadium, Miami (United States)	27 July 2013	6/7 August 2013
XLII Trofeu Taronja – Estrella Damm	Valencia CF	One match trophy		Mestalla, Valencia (Spain)	10 August 2013	

Source: Pre-season and friendlies

=== La Liga ===
==== League table ====
Pos	Team	Pld	W	D	L	GF	GA	GD	Pts	Qualification or relegation
6	Villarreal	38	17	8	13	60	44	+16	59 (Note: Villarreal finished ahead of Real Sociedad on head-to-head points: Villarreal 5–1 Real Sociedad, Real Sociedad 1–2 Villarreal.)	Qualification for the Europa League play-off round (Note: Since both the 2013–14 Copa del Rey champions (Real Madrid) and runners-up (Barcelona) qualified for the 2014–15 UEFA Champions League, the 5th, 6th and 7th placed teams qualified for the group stage, play-off round and third qualifying round of the 2014–15 UEFA Europa League respectively.)
7	Real Sociedad	38	16	11	11	62	55	+7	59	Qualification for the Europa League third qualifying round
8	Valencia	38	13	10	15	51	53	−2	49	
9	Celta Vigo	38	14	7	17	49	54	−5	49	
10	Levante	38	12	12	14	35	43	−8	48	

Source: La Liga, ESPN
Rules for classification: 1st points; 2nd head-to-head points;

==== Matches ====
17 August 2013 1	Valencia	1–0	Málaga	Valencia
23:00 CEST (UTC+02:00)	Míchel (yellow card) 13'; Pereira (yellow card) 53'; Costa 65', (yellow card) 86'	Live TV: / Gol T / Gol Stadium	Chen (yellow card) 38'; Antunes (yellow card) 46'; Olinga (yellow card) 66'; Darder (yellow card) 78'	Stadium: Mestalla; Attendance: 35.000; Referee: Alfonso Álvarez Izquierdo

24 August 2013 2	Espanyol	3–1	Valencia	Cornellà de Llobregat
21:00 CEST (UTC+02:00)	López (yellow card) 22', (goal) 32'; Simão (yellow card) 45+2'; Stuani 47'; Bifouma 88'; Abraham (yellow card) 90+2'	Live TV: / Gol T / Gol Stadium	Postiga 10'; Rami (yellow card) 45+2'; Banega (yellow card) 52'; Costa (yellow card) 80'	Stadium: Cornellà-El Prat; Attendance: 18,121; Referee: Carlos Velasco Carballo

1 September 2013 3	Valencia	2–3	Barcelona	Valencia
21:00 CEST (UTC+02:00)	Pereira (yellow card) 16'; Banega (yellow card) 44'; Postiga 45', 45+3'	Summary	Messi 11', 39', 41'; Alba (yellow card) 29'; Alves (yellow card) 65'; Neymar (yellow card) 75'	Stadium: Mestalla; Attendance: 45.000; Referee: José Teixeira Vitienes

15 September 2013 4	Betis	3–1	Valencia	Seville
21:00 CEST (UTC+02:00)	Molina 9'; Sevilla 22', 34'	Summary	Parejo (yellow card) 64'; Costa 67'	Stadium: Benito Villamarín; Attendance: 31,412; Referee: Xavier Estrada Fernández

22 September 2013 5	Valencia	3–1	Sevilla	Valencia
21:00 CEST (UTC+02:00)	Jonas 32', 73', (yellow card) 38'; Ruiz 82'; Banega (yellow card) 90+1'	Report	Gameiro 52'; Cala (yellow card) 89'	Stadium: Mestalla; Attendance: 35,000; Referee: Alberto Undiano Mallenco

25 September 2013 6	Granada	0–1	Valencia	Granada
20:00 CEST (UTC+02:00)	Buonanotte (yellow card) 32'; Nyom (yellow card) 33'; Pereira (yellow card) 54'; Angulo (yellow card) 58'	Report	Fuego (yellow card) 18'; Jonas (yellow card) 28', (goal) 90+4'	Stadium: Los Cármenes; Attendance: 13,060; Referee: Fernando Teixeira Vitienes

28 September 2013 7	Valencia	1–0	Rayo Vallecano	Valencia
16:00 CEST (UTC+02:00)	Ruiz (yellow card) 14'; Pereira (yellow card) 31'; Jonas 37'; Cartabia (yellow card) 62'	Report	Baena (yellow card) 10'; Arbilla (yellow card) 42'; Adrián (yellow card) 63'; Saúl (yellow card) 76'; Castro (yellow card) 80'	Stadium: Mestalla; Attendance: 35,000; Referee: David Fernández Borbalán

6 October 2013 8	Athletic Bilbao	1–1	Valencia	Bilbao
21:00 CEST (UTC+02:00)	Saborit (yellow card) 27'; Gurpegui (yellow card) 45+2'; Rico 76'	Report	Feghouli (yellow card) 20'; Guardado (yellow card) 38'; Banega 43' (pen.)	Stadium: San Mamés; Attendance: 36,651; Referee: Carlos del Cerro Grande

19 October 2013 9	Valencia	1–2	Real Sociedad	Valencia
16:00 CEST (UTC+02:00)	Banega (yellow card) 40'; Fuego (yellow card) 40'; Ruiz (yellow card) 75'; Pabón 90+3'	Report	De la Bella (yellow card) 3'; Griezmann 41'; Pardo 59'	Stadium: Mestalla; Attendance: 35,000; Referee: Alejandro Hernández Hernández

27 October 2013 10	Villarreal	4–1	Valencia	Villarreal
15:00 CET (UTC+02:00)	Uche 17'; Pérez 22'; J. Costa (yellow card) 43'; Dos Santos 49', 84'; Dorado (yellow card) 51'; Pina (yellow card) 87'	Report	Banega (yellow card) 49'; Fuego (yellow card) 54'; Canales (yellow card) 58'; R. Costa 63'	Stadium: El Madrigal; Attendance: 22,539; Referee: Carlos Clos Gómez

30 October 2013 11	Valencia	1–2	Almería	Valencia
18:00 (CET) (UTC+01:00)	Jonas 33' (pen.)	Report	Dubarbier (yellow card) 19'; Barbosa (yellow card) 28'; Pellerano (yellow card) 35'; Torsiglieri 62'; Vidal 70'; Nélson (yellow card) 83'; Suso (yellow card) 85'	Stadium: Mestalla; Attendance: 27,500; Referee: Eduardo Prieto Iglesias

3 November 2013 12	Getafe	0–1	Valencia	Getafe
10:00 CET (UTC+01:00)	Sarabia (yellow card) 35'; Pedro León (yellow card) 79'; Marica (yellow card) 81'; Escudero (yellow card) 86'; Mosquera (yellow card) 86'; Alexis (yellow card) 90+3'	Report	Pabón 41'; Alcácer (yellow card) 90'; Guaita (yellow card) 90+3'	Stadium: Coliseum Alfonso Pérez; Attendance: 7,500; Referee: Ignacio Iglesias Villanueva

10 November 2013 13	Valencia	2–2	Valladolid	Valencia
15:00 CET (UTC+01:00)	Alcácer (yellow card) 11'; Pabón 29'; Feghouli 76'	Report	Mariño (yellow card) 4'; Guerra 9'; Rubio (yellow card) 19'; García 50'; Rueda (yellow card) 55'; Rossi (yellow card) 64'; Sastre (yellow card) 69'	Stadium: Mestalla; Attendance: 35,000; Referee: Carlos Delgado Ferreiro

24 November 2013 14	Elche	3–1	Valencia	Elche
17:00 CET (UTC+01:00)	Fidel 57'; Márquez (yellow card) 61'; Herrera 84'; Rivera (yellow card) 87'	Report	Costa (yellow card) 7'; Bernat (yellow card) 90'; Postiga (yellow card) 90'	Stadium: Martínez Valero; Attendance: 30,076; Referee: Alberto Undiano Mallenco

1 December 2013 15	Valencia	3–0	Osasuna	Valencia
17:00 CET (UTC+01:00)	Guardado (yellow card) 10'; Jonas 45', 48', 53'	Report	Damià (yellow card) 12'; Puñal (red card) 17'	Stadium: Mestalla; Attendance: 31,000; Referee: Carlos Velasco Carballo

15 December 2013 16	Atlético Madrid	3–0	Valencia	Madrid
19:00 CET (UTC+01:00)	Juanfran (yellow card) 36'; Costa (yellow card) 45', (goal) 59', 81' (pen.); García 64'	Report	Romeu (yellow card) 12'; Feghouli (yellow card) 15'; Parejo (yellow card) 45'; Ruiz (yellow card) 74'	Stadium: Vicente Calderón; Attendance: 46,200; Referee: David Fernández Borbalán

22 December 2013 17	Valencia	2–3	Real Madrid	Valencia
19:00 CET (UTC+01:00)	Piatti 34', (yellow card) 54'; Mathieu (yellow card) 58', (goal) 62'	Report	Di María 28'; Ronaldo 40'; Nacho (yellow card) 41'; Arbeloa (yellow card) 64'; Jesé 82'	Stadium: Mestalla; Attendance: 40,000; Referee: Fernando Teixeira Vitienes

4 January 2014 18	Valencia	2–0	Levante	Valencia
18:00 CET (UTC+01:00)	Costa (yellow card) 40'; Piatti 42'; Mathieu (yellow card) 62'; Feghouli 73'; Banega (yellow card) 90'	Report	Simão Mate (yellow card) 64'	Stadium: Mestalla; Attendance: 40,000; Referee: César Muñiz Fernández

11 January 2014 19	Celta Vigo	2–1	Valencia	Vigo
16:00 CET (UTC+01:00)	Charles 50', 78'	Report	Parejo 23'; Guardado (yellow card) 44'; Pereira (yellow card) 58'	Stadium: Balaídos; Attendance: 20,000; Referee: José González González

17 January 2014 20	Málaga	0–0	Valencia	Málaga
19:00 CET (UTC+01:00)	Eliseu (yellow card) 28'; Sánchez (yellow card) 45+1'	Report	Mathieu (yellow card) 17'; Romeu (yellow card) 43'; Piatti (yellow card) 66'; Alcácer (yellow card) 70'	Stadium: La Rosaleda; Attendance: 15,102; Referee: Carlos Velasco Carballo

25 January 2014 21	Valencia	2–2	Espanyol	Valencia
18:00 CET (UTC+01:00)	Alcácer 7'; Romeu (yellow card) 9'; Jonas 32', (yellow card) 56'; Mathieu (yellow card) 45'	Report	Córdoba 3'; García 45' (pen.)	Stadium: Mestalla; Attendance: 35,000; Referee: David Fernández Borbalán

1 February 2014 22	Barcelona	2–3	Valencia	Barcelona
14:00 CET (UTC+01:00)	Sánchez 7'; Alba (yellow card) 52' (yellow-red card) 78'; Messi 54' (pen.); Mascherano (yellow card) 79'	Report	Parejo 44', (yellow card) 45+1'; Piatti 48'; Costa (yellow card) 53'; Alcácer 59'; Alves (yellow card) 90+4'	Stadium: Camp Nou; Attendance: 66,969; Referee: Pedro Pérez Montero

8 February 2014 23	Valencia	5–0	Betis	Valencia
14:00 CET (UTC+01:00)	Mathieu 41'; Alcácer 44', 68'; Feghouli 62'; Vargas 79'	Report	Reyes (yellow card) 23'; Figueras (yellow card) 53'	Stadium: Mestalla; Attendance: 40,000; Referee: Xavier Estrada Fernández

16 February 2014 24	Sevilla	0–0	Valencia	Seville
20:00 CET (UTC+01:00)	Coke (yellow card) 20'; Vitolo (yellow card) 58'; Cheryshev (yellow card) 69' (yellow-red card) 90+3'	Report	Costa (yellow card) 41' (yellow-red card) 50'; Bernat (yellow card) 62'; Senderos (yellow card) 62'; Parejo (yellow card) 64'; Vargas (yellow card) 77'; Alves (yellow card) 90'	Stadium: Ramón Sánchez Pizjuán; Attendance: 30,000; Referee: Alfonso Álvarez Izquierdo

23 February 2014 25	Valencia	2–1	Granada	Valencia
13:00 CET (UTC+01:00)	Keita (yellow card) 25'; Cartabia (yellow card) 42'; Alcácer 64', (yellow card) 69'; Parejo (yellow card) 77'; Míchel (yellow card) 77'; Vezo 90+1'	Report	Piti 47'; Murillo (yellow card) 56'; Nyom (yellow card) 75'; Iturra (yellow card) 77'	Stadium: Mestalla; Attendance: 37,700; Referee: José González González

2 March 2014 26	Rayo Vallecano	1–0	Valencia	Madrid
15:00 CET (UTC+01:00)	Tito (yellow card) 19'; Saúl (yellow card) 49'; Larrivey 60'; Trashorras (yellow card) 82'	Report	Portu (yellow card) 33'; Barragán (yellow card) 62' (yellow-red card) 76'	Stadium: Campo de Vallecas; Attendance: 9,720; Referee: Carlos Clos Gómez

9 March 2014 27	Valencia	1–1	Athletic Bilbao	Valencia
16:00 CET (UTC+01:00)	Keita (yellow card) 5'; Alcácer 23'; Mathieu (yellow card) 31'; Feghouli (yellow card) 51'	Report	De Marcos (yellow card) 27'; Aduriz 53' (pen.); Iraola (yellow card) 71'	Stadium: Mestalla; Attendance: 36,000; Referee: David Fernández Borbalán

16 March 2014 28	Real Sociedad	1–0	Valencia	San Sebastián
16:00 CET (UTC+01:00)	Agirretxe 61'; Bravo (yellow card) 90+2'; José Ángel (yellow card) 90+3'	Report	Barragán (yellow card) 42'; Bernat (yellow card) 64'; Míchel (yellow card) 87'; Senderos (yellow card) 90+2'	Stadium: Anoeta; Attendance: 23,845; Referee: Xavier Estrada Fernández

23 March 2014 29	Valencia	2–1	Villarreal	Valencia
14:00 CET (UTC+01:00)	Fuego 35', 44'; Pereira (yellow card) 45'; Cartabia (yellow card) 77'	Report	Pina (yellow card) 35'; Cani (yellow card) 45'; Óliver (yellow card) 61'; Dos Santos 83'	Stadium: Mestalla; Attendance: 37,214; Referee: Pedro Pérez Montero

27 March 2014 30	Almería	2–2	Valencia	Almería
17:00 CET (UTC+01:00)	Corona (yellow card) 9', (goal) 54'; Vidal (yellow card) 25'; Trujillo (yellow card) 39'; Díaz 53', (yellow card) 57'; Verza (yellow card) 86'	Report	Keita 1'; Vargas 34'; Pereira (yellow card) 81'	Stadium: Mediterráneo; Attendance: 11,251; Referee: José Teixeira Vitienes

30 March 2014 31	Valencia	1–3	Getafe	Valencia
15:00 CEST (UTC+02:00)	Vargas 6'; Mathieu (yellow card) 63' (yellow-red card) 89'; Parejo (yellow card) 70'; Senderos (yellow card) 90'	Report	Escudero (yellow card) 21'; Lafita 25', (yellow card) 85'; Marica 27'; López (yellow card) 33'; Mosquera (yellow card) 73'; Pedro León 88'	Stadium: Mestalla; Attendance: 28,500; Referee: Jesús Gil Manzano

6 April 2014 32	Valladolid	0–0	Valencia	Valladolid
15:00 CEST (UTC+02:00)	Rubio (yellow card) 56'	Report	Fuego (yellow card) 70'; Cartabia (yellow card) 90+1'	Stadium: José Zorrilla; Attendance: 16,009; Referee: César Muñiz Fernández

13 April 2014 33	Valencia	2–1	Elche	Valencia
11:00 CEST (UTC+02:00)	Piatti 22', (yellow card) 70'; Parejo 61', (yellow card) 84'; Barragán (yellow card) 72' (yellow-red card) 90+3'; Fuego (yellow card) 90+2'	Report	Coro 28'; Pérez (yellow card) 53'; Cisma (yellow card) 72'	Stadium: Mestalla; Attendance: 38,389; Referee: Alfonso Álvarez Izquierdo

19 April 2014 34	Osasuna	1–1	Valencia	Pamplona
10:00 CEST (UTC+02:00)	Riera 19'; Torres (yellow card) 21'; Damià (yellow card) 45'; Silva (yellow card) 67'	Report	Keita (yellow card) 56'; Mathieu (yellow card) 74'; Jonas 82'	Stadium: El Sadar; Attendance: 16,975; Referee: Xavier Estrada Fernández

27 April 2014 35	Valencia	0–1	Atlético Madrid	Valencia
11:00 CEST (UTC+02:00)	Jonas (yellow card) 37'; Fuego (yellow card) 86'; Vargas (yellow card) 90'	Report	García 43'; Godín (yellow card) 70'; Juanfran (red card) 90+1'	Stadium: Mestalla; Attendance: 35,000; Referee: Alberto Undiano Mallenco

4 May 2014 36	Real Madrid	2–2	Valencia	Madrid
15:00 CEST (UTC+02:00)	Di María (yellow card) 51'; Ramos 59'; Ronaldo 90+2'	Report	Mathieu 44'; Parejo 65'; Keita (yellow card) 70'; Alves (yellow card) 80'; Feghouli (yellow card) 90+4'	Stadium: Santiago Bernabéu; Attendance: 71,897; Referee: Carlos Clos Gómez

10 May 2014 37	Levante	2–0	Valencia	Valencia
16:00 CEST (UTC+02:00)	Diop (yellow card) 44'; Sissoko (yellow card) 45'; Juanfran (yellow card) 56'; Ángel 70'; Ivanschitz 81'; Simão Mate (yellow card) 85'; López (red card) 88'	Report	Costa (yellow card) 40'; Alcácer (yellow card) 54'; Senderos (yellow card) 83'; Vargas (yellow card) 85'; Pereira (yellow card) 90+5'	Stadium: Ciutat de València; Attendance: 19,896; Referee: Carlos Velasco Carballo

17 May 2014 38	Valencia	2–1	Celta Vigo	Valencia
16:00 CEST (UTC+02:00)	Pereira (yellow card) 32'; Feghouli 41'; Piatti 55'	Report	Í. López 5'; Aurtenetxe (yellow card) 34'; Á. López (yellow card) 55'; Nolito (yellow card) 80'	Stadium: Mestalla; Attendance: 25,860; Referee: Carlos del Cerro Grande

=== Copa del Rey ===
Valencia began in the last 32, beating Segunda División B side Gimnàstic de Tarragona before losing to Atlético Madrid in the last 16.

=== UEFA Europa League ===
==== Group stage ====
Pos	Team	Pld	W	D	L	GF	GA	GD	Pts	Qualification	VAL	SWA	KUB	STG
1	(Spain) Valencia	6	4	1	1	12	7	+5	13	Advance to knockout phase	—	0–3	1–1	5–1
2	(England) Swansea City	6	2	2	2	6	4	+2	8	Advance to knockout phase	0–1	—	1–1	1–0
3	(Russia) Kuban Krasnodar	6	1	3	2	7	7	0	6 (Note: Tied on head-to-head points (3). Head-to-head goal difference: Kuban Krasnodar +2, St. Gallen −2.)		0–2	1–1	—	4–0
4	(Switzerland) St. Gallen	6	2	0	4	6	13	−7	6		2–3	1–0	2–0	—

Source: Soccerway
Notes:

19 September 2013 1	Valencia (Spain)	0–3	(England) Swansea City	Valencia, Spain
19:00 CEST (UTC+02:00)	Rami (red card) 10'; Fuego (yellow card) 45+1'; Banega (yellow card) 77'	Report	Rangel (yellow card) 14'; Bony 14'; Michu 58'; De Guzmán 62'	Stadium: Mestalla; Attendance: 32,000; Referee: Serge Gumienny (Belgium)

3 October 2013 2	Kuban Krasnodar (Russia)	0–2	(Spain) Valencia	Krasnodar, Russia
18:00 CEST (UTC+02:00)	Khubulov (yellow card) 20'; Kozlov (yellow card) 40'; Melgarejo (yellow card) 86'	Report	Parejo (yellow card) 43'; Barragán (yellow card) 47'; Alcácer 73'; Feghouli 81'	Stadium: Kuban Stadium; Attendance: 29,300; Referee: Marijo Strahonja (Croatia)

24 October 2013 3	Valencia (Spain)	5–1	(Switzerland) St. Gallen	Valencia, Spain
21:05 CEST (UTC+02:00)	Alcácer 12'; Cartabia 21', 30'; Costa 33'; Canales 71'	Report	Janjatović (yellow card) 27'; Nater 74'	Stadium: Mestalla; Attendance: 26,645; Referee: Pol van Boekel (Netherlands)

7 November 2013 4	St. Gallen (Switzerland)	2–3	(Spain) Valencia	St. Gallen, Switzerland
19:00 CET (UTC+01:00)	Besle 37'; Karanović 66'	Report	Piatti 30', 76'; Canales 86'	Stadium: AFG Arena; Attendance: 16,951; Referee: Aleksei Kulbakov (Belarus)

28 November 2013 5	Swansea City (England)	0–1	(Spain) Valencia	Swansea, Wales
21:05 CET (UTC+01:00)	Rangel (yellow card) 5'; Vázquez (yellow card) 45+1'; Shelvey (yellow card) 87'	Report	Parejo 20', (yellow card) 70'; Guardado (yellow card) 53'; Jonas (yellow card) 61'	Stadium: Liberty Stadium; Attendance: 17,896; Referee: Luca Banti (Italy)

12 December 2013 6	Valencia (Spain)	1–1	(Russia) Kuban Krasnodar	Valencia, Spain
19:00 CET (UTC+01:00)	Fuego (yellow card) 55'; Alcácer 67'; Ruiz (red card) 90'	Report	Sosnin (yellow card) 48'; Melgarejo (yellow card) 51', (goal) 84'; Ignatyev (yellow card) 82'	Stadium: Mestalla; Attendance: 14,581; Referee: Miroslav Zelinka (Czech Republic)

==== Knockout phase ====
20 February 2014 Round of 32 1st leg	Dynamo Kyiv (Ukraine)	0–2	(Spain) Valencia	Nicosia, Cyprus
20:00 EEST (UTC+3)	Silva (yellow card) 55'	Report	Jonas (yellow card) 77'; Vargas 79'; Feghouli 90+1'	Stadium: GSP Stadium; Attendance: 3,711; Referee: Liran Liany (Israel)

27 February 2014 Round of 32 2nd leg	Valencia (Spain)	0–0 (2–0 agg.)	(Ukraine) Dynamo Kyiv	Valencia, Spain
22:05 EEST (UTC+3)	Cartabia (yellow card) 29'; Parejo (yellow card) 62'; Pereira (yellow card) 90'	Report	Lens (yellow card) 25'; Vukojević (yellow card) 54'; Husyev (yellow card) 90+4'	Stadium: Mestalla; Attendance: 26,261; Referee: Deniz Aytekin (Germany)

13 March 2014 Round of 16 1st leg	Ludogorets Razgrad (Bulgaria)	0–3	(Spain) Valencia	Sofia, Bulgaria
20:00 EET	Juninho (red card) 80'	Report	Barragán 5'; Keita (red card) 24'; Cartabia 33'; Senderos 59'	Stadium: Vasil Levski National Stadium; Attendance: 41,085; Referee: Clément Turpin (France)

20 March 2014 Round of 16 2nd leg	Valencia (Spain)	1–0 (4–0 agg.)	(Bulgaria) Ludogorets Razgrad	Valencia, Spain
20:00 EET	Alcácer 59'	Report		Stadium: Mestalla; Attendance: 18,429; Referee: Anastasios Sidiropoulos (Greece)

3 April 2014 Quarter-finals 1st leg	Basel (Switzerland)	3–0	(Spain) Valencia	Basel, Switzerland
21:05	Serey Die (yellow card) 13'; Delgado 34' 38'; Embolo (yellow card) 76'; Stocker 90+1'	Report	(yellow card) 19' Senderos	Stadium: St. Jakob-Park; Attendance: 350; Referee: Martin Atkinson (England)

10 April 2014 Quarter-finals 2nd leg	Valencia (Spain)	5–0 (a.e.t.) (5–3 agg.)	(Switzerland) Basel	Valencia, Spain
21:05	Feghouli (yellow card) 27'; Alcácer 38' 70' 113' (yellow card) 114'; Vargas 42' (yellow card) 104'; Keita (yellow card) 98'; Bernat (yellow card) 115' (goal) 118'; Guaita (yellow card) 117'	Report	(yellow card) 24' Safari; (yellow card) 61' Elneny; (yellow card) 65' Schär; (yellow card) 74' (red card) 100' Díaz; (yellow card) 104' (red card) 105' Gastón Sauro; (yellow card) 106' Xhaka	Stadium: Mestalla; Attendance: 33,152; Referee: Viktor Kassai (Hungary)

24 April 2014 Semi-finals 1st leg	Sevilla (Spain)	2–0	(Spain) Valencia	Seville, Spain
21:05 CEST (UTC+02:00)	Mbia 33'; Bacca 36'; Marin (yellow card) 71'	Report	Alcácer (yellow card) 89'; Mathieu (yellow card) 90+2'	Stadium: Ramón Sánchez Pizjuán; Attendance: 33,496; Referee: Damir Skomina (Slovenia)

1 May 2014 Semi-finals 2nd leg	Valencia (Spain)	3–1 (3–3(a) agg.)	(Spain) Sevilla	Valencia, Spain
21:05 CEST (UTC+02:00)	Feghouli 14', (yellow card) 73'; Beto 26' (o.g.); Bernat (yellow card) 53'; Mathieu 69', (yellow card) 90+3'; Alves (yellow card) 82'	Report	Carriço (yellow card) 86'; Mbia 90+4'; Jairo (yellow card) 90+4'	Stadium: Mestalla; Attendance: 45,938; Referee: Milorad Mažić (Serbia)

== Pre-season and friendlies ==
Valencia began training on 8 July 2013. The stage of pre-season was in Speyer, Germany, from Wednesday 10 July until Sunday 21 July, all players were invited and Mestalla members invited were Fede Cartabia, Mario Arqués, Salva Ruiz, José Luis Gayà and Robert. Players joining days later included Ricardo Costa, João Pereira, Adil Rami and Jérémy Mathieu on 9 July; Paco Alcácer on 10 July, Jonas, Éver Banega and Sofiane Feghouli on 13 July; Andrés Guardado, Juan Bernat and Gayà on 22 July; and Roberto Soldado on 27 July. Fernando Gago did not join the team. On 21 July, they returned to Valencia to participate in the International Champions Cup, which began in Valencia, then continued in the United States in August. Valencia presentations and the Orange Trophy were played on 10 August.

14 July 2013 Germany Tour	Karlsruher SC (Germany)	2–1	(Spain) Valencia	Karlsruhe, Germany
16:00 CEST (UTC+02:00)	Van der Biezen 6'; Nazarov 87' (pen.)	VCF Report; SD Report; AS Report; MARCA Report	Viera 10'; Parejo (yellow card) 34'; Rami (yellow card) 61'	Stadium: Wildparkstadion; Attendance: 10,117; Referee: Raid (Germany)

17 July 2013 Germany Tour	Waldhof Mannheim (Germany)	0–0	(Spain) Valencia	Mannheim, Germany
19:00 CEST (UTC+02:00)		VCF Report; SD Report; AS Report; MARCA Report	Pereira (yellow card) 36'	Stadium: Carl-Benz-Stadion; Attendance: 4,242; Referee: Marcel Göpferich (Germany)

20 July 2013 Germany Tour	VfB Stuttgart (Germany)	1–0	(Spain) Valencia	Ludwigsburg, Germany
17:00 CEST (UTC+02:00)	Schwaab 2'	VCF Report; SD Report; AS Report; MARCA Report; Live TV: Gol T / Gol Stadium	Jonas (yellow card) 81'	Stadium: Ludwig-Jahn-Stadion; Attendance: 4,500; Referee: Knut Kircher (Germany)

27 July 2013 ICC, Round 1	Valencia (Spain)	1–2	(Italy) Milan	Valencia, Spain
20:00 CEST (UTC+02:00)	Banega (yellow card) 43'; Pereira (yellow card) 48'; Parejo 53'	Report; VCF Report; SD Report; AS Report; MARCA Report; Live TV: Gol Stadium	Robinho 21'; Boateng (yellow card) 24'; Nocerino (yellow card) 24'; De Jong 38'; Mexès (yellow card) 52'; Cristante (yellow card) 90'	Stadium: Mestalla; Attendance: 17,000; Referee: Carlos Alberto Carbonell Hernández (Spain, Valencian Committee)

5 August 2013 ICC, Round 2: Eastern losers	Valencia (Spain)	4–0	(Italy) Internazionale	New York, United States
16:00 EST (UTC−05:00)	Banega 7'; Viera 33', 88'; Costa (yellow card) 53'; Jonas 55'	Report; VCF Report; SD Report; AS Report; MARCA Report; Live TV: Gol T / Gol Stadium	Pereira (yellow card) 18'; Juan (yellow card) 53'; Olsen (yellow card) 83'	Stadium: MetLife Stadium; Attendance: 39,764; Referee: Mark Kadlecik (United States)

6 August 2013 ICC, Championship Round: 5th place	Everton (England)	0–1	(Spain) Valencia	Miami, United States
21:00 EST (UTC−05:00)		Report; VCF Report; SD Report; AS Report; MARCA Report; Live TV: Gol T / Gol Stadium	Barragán (yellow card) 8'; Míchel 51'	Stadium: Sun Life Stadium; Attendance: 38,513; Referee: Alan Chapman (United States)

10 August 2013 Trofeu Taronja - Trofeo Estrella Damm	Valencia (Spain)	2–1	(Greece) Olympiacos	Valencia, Spain
22:00 CEST (UTC+02:00)	Banega 4'; Postiga 40'	VCF Report; SD Report; AS Report; MARCA Report; Live TV: Gol T / Gol Stadium	Fejsa (yellow card) 31'; Fuster 84'	Stadium: Mestalla; Attendance: 35,000; Referee: Mateu Lahoz (Spain, Valencian Committee)
Note: Orange Trophy winner: Valencia

6 September 2013 Ciudad de Valladolid	Valladolid (Spain)	2–4	(Spain) Valencia	Valladolid, Spain
20:00 CEST (UTC+02:00)				Stadium: José Zorrilla

Last updated: 11 August 2013.
Source: Valencia CF

== Statistics ==
=== Appearances and goals ===
Last updated on 17 May 2014

No.	Pos	Nat	Player	Total		La Liga		Copa del Rey		Europa League	
No.	Pos	Nat	Player	Apps	Goals	Apps	Goals	Apps	Goals	Apps	Goals
Goalkeepers
1	GK	(Brazil) BRA	Diego Alves	35	0	27	0	1	0	7	0
13	GK	(Spain) ESP	Vicente Guaita	23	0	11+2	0	3	0	7	0
Defenders
3	DF	(Portugal) POR	Rúben Vezo	8	1	5+3	1	0	0	0	0
4	DF	(Switzerland) SUI	Philippe Senderos	11	1	7+1	0	0	0	2+1	1
5	DF	(Spain) ESP	Víctor Ruiz	19	1	8+3	1	1	0	6+1	0
12	DF	(Portugal) POR	João Pereira	38	0	23+2	0	2	0	11	0
14	DF	(Spain) ESP	Juan Bernat	49	2	26+6	1	4	0	11+2	1
19	DF	(Spain) ESP	Antonio Barragán	31	1	17+3	0	2	0	4+5	1
20	MF	(Portugal) POR	Ricardo Costa	32	3	20	3	3	0	7+2	0
22	DF	(France) FRA	Jérémy Mathieu	47	4	32	3	4	0	10+1	1
31	DF	(Spain) ESP	José Luis Gayà	4	0	1	0	0	0	2+1	0
Midfielders
6	MF	(Spain) ESP	Oriol Romeu	18	0	11+2	0	1	0	3+1	0
8	MF	(Algeria) ALG	Sofiane Feghouli	45	7	22+10	4	2+1	0	7+3	3
11	MF	(Mali) MLI	Seydou Keita	18	1	9+2	1	0	0	7	0
15	MF	(Spain) ESP	Javi Fuego	40	2	25+2	2	3	0	8+2	0
21	MF	(Spain) ESP	Dani Parejo	46	5	28+3	4	4	0	10+1	1
24	MF	(Spain) ESP	Míchel	27	0	13+6	0	2	0	5+1	0
28	MF	(Argentina) ARG	Fede Cartabia	40	3	16+9	0	3	0	10+2	3
29	MF	(Spain) ESP	Portu	2	0	1	0	0	0	0+1	0
Forwards
2	FW	(Argentina) ARG	Pablo Piatti	29	7	13+4	5	0+3	0	3+6	2
7	FW	(Brazil) BRA	Jonas	40	10	23+8	10	1	0	4+4	0
16	FW	(Spain) ESP	Paco Alcácer	37	14	17+6	6	1+2	1	8+3	7
17	FW	(Chile) CHI	Eduardo Vargas	25	5	13+4	3	0	0	7+1	2
25	MF	(Brazil) BRA	Vinícius Araújo	6	0	0+6	0	0	0	0	0
Players who have made an appearance or had a squad number this season but have been loaned out or transferred
4	DF	(France) FRA	Adil Rami	4	0	3	0	0	0	1	0
10	MF	(Argentina) ARG	Éver Banega	22	1	14+4	1	1+1	0	2	0
17	MF	(Spain) ESP	Jonathan Viera	1	0	1	0	0	0	0	0
18	MF	(Mexico) MEX	Andrés Guardado	22	0	12+4	0	3	0	3	0
23	MF	(Spain) ESP	Sergio Canales	27	2	7+12	0	1+2	0	5	2
9	FW	(Portugal) POR	Hélder Postiga	23	4	9+6	3	2+1	1	3+2	0
11	FW	(Colombia) COL	Dorlan Pabón	18	3	11+2	3	0+2	0	1+2	0
