= 2014–15 Valencia CF season =

95th season in existence of Valencia CF

Valencia
2014–15 season
- Owner: Peter Lim
- President: Amadeo Salvo
- Head coach: Nuno Espírito Santo
- Stadium: Mestalla
- La Liga: 4th
- Copa del Rey: Round of 16
- Top goalscorer: League: Dani Parejo (11); All: Paco Alcácer (14)
Home colours	Away colours	Third colours

The 2014–15 Valencia CF season was the club's 95th season in its history and its 80th in La Liga. This was the first season since 1997–98 that Valencia would not compete in any European competition due to having its lowest finish in six years the previous season. The team competed in La Liga and the Copa del Rey. In La Liga, they finished fourth, qualifying for the play-off round of the 2015–16 UEFA Champions League. In the Copa del Rey, Valencia lost to Espanyol in the round of 16. Dani Parejo was the club's top scorer in the league, with 12 goals, while Paco Alcácer was the club's top scorer overall, with 14 goals.

== Squad ==
As of 1 September 2014

Note: Flags indicate national team as defined under FIFA eligibility rules; some limited exceptions apply. Players may hold more than one non-FIFA nationality.

No.	Pos.	Nation	Player
1	GK	BRA	Diego Alves
2	DF	POR	João Cancelo (on loan from Benfica)
3	DF	POR	Rúben Vezo
4	MF	BRA	Filipe Augusto (on loan from Rio Ave)
5	DF	GER	Shkodran Mustafi
6	DF	ARG	Lucas Orbán
7	FW	ESP	Álvaro Negredo (on loan from Manchester City)
8	MF	ALG	Sofiane Feghouli
9	FW	ESP	Paco Alcácer
10	MF	ESP	Dani Parejo (captain)

No.	Pos.	Nation	Player
11	MF	ARG	Pablo Piatti
13	GK	ESP	Yoel (on loan from Celta Vigo)
15	MF	ARG	Enzo Pérez
17	FW	ESP	Rodrigo
18	MF	ESP	Javi Fuego
19	DF	ESP	Antonio Barragán
20	MF	ARG	Rodrigo De Paul
21	MF	POR	André Gomes
23	DF	ARG	Nicolás Otamendi
31	DF	ESP	José Luis Gayà

=== Out on loan ===
Note: Flags indicate national team as defined under FIFA eligibility rules; some limited exceptions apply. Players may hold more than one non-FIFA nationality.

No.	Pos.	Nation	Player
—	DF	ESP	Víctor Ruiz (at Villarreal until 30 June 2015)
—	MF	ARG	Federico Cartabia (at Córdoba until 30 June 2015)
—	MF	MEX	Andrés Guardado (at PSV until 30 June 2015)
—	FW	BRA	Vinícius Araújo (at Standard Liège until 30 June 2015)
—	MF	ESP	Robert Ibáñez (at Granada until 30 June 2015)

=== In ===
No.	Pos.	Nat.	Name	Age	EU	Moving from	Type	Transfer window	Ends	Transfer fee	Source
7	ST	(Spain)	Álvaro Negredo	29	EU	Manchester City	Loan	Summer	2020	N/A	Valencia
20	AM	(Argentina)	Rodrigo De Paul	20	Non-EU	Racing Club	Transfer	Summer	2018	€4,600,000	El Mundo
21	CM	(Portugal)	André Gomes	21	EU	Benfica	Loan	Summer	2015	€M	Valencia C.F.
17	FW	(Spain)	Rodrigo	23	EU	Benfica (Portugal)	Loan	Summer	2015	€4,000,000	Valencia C.F.
5	DF	(Germany)	Shkodran Mustafi	22	EU	Sampdoria (Italy)	Transfer	Summer	2019	€8,000,000	Valencia C.F.
	MF	(Argentina)	Enzo Pérez	28	Non-EU	Benfica (Portugal)	Transfer	Winter	2019	€25,000,000	Valencia C.F.

Total expenditure: €39,600,000

=== Out ===
No.	Pos.	Nat.	Name	Age	EU	Moving to	Type	Transfer window	Transfer fee	Source
28	AM	(Argentina)	Fede Cartabia	21	EU	Córdoba	Loan	Summer	N/A	Córdoba C.F.
22	CB	(France)	Jérémy Mathieu	30	EU	Barcelona	Transfer	Summer	€20,000,000	F.C. Barcelona
24	AM	(Spain)	Míchel	25	EU	Getafe	Loan	Summer	N/A	Getafe C.F.
13	GK	(Spain)	Vicente Guaita	27	EU	Getafe	Transfer	Summer	N/A	Valencia C.F.
5	CB	(Spain)	Víctor Ruiz	25	EU	Villarreal	Loan	Summer	N/A	Villarreal C.F.
17	FW	(Chile)	Eduardo Vargas	24	Non-EU	Napoli (Italy)	End of loan	Summer	N/A	[]
6	CM	(Spain)	Oriol Romeu	22	EU	Chelsea (England)	End of loan	Summer	N/A	[]
N/A	LB	(France)	Aly Cissokho	26	EU	Aston Villa (England)	Transfer	Summer	Undisclosed	BBC Sport
N/A	MF	(Spain)	Míchel	26	EU	Guangzhou R&F	Transfer	Winter	€600,000	Superdeporte
N/A	MF	(Spain)	Carles Gil	22	EU	Aston Villa (England)	Transfer	Winter	€4,500,000	BBC Sport

Total revenue: €25,100,000

Net income: ▲€25,100,000

== Competitions ==
=== Overall ===
Competition	Started round	Final position / round	First match	Last match
La Liga	—		August 2014	May 2015
Copa del Rey	Round of 32		December 2014	

Updated to match played June 2014
Source: Competitions

=== La Liga ===
Valencia didn't secure 4th position until the last match.

==== League table ====
Pos	Team	Pld	W	D	L	GF	GA	GD	Pts	Qualification or relegation
2	Real Madrid	38	30	2	6	118	38	+80	92	Qualification for the Champions League group stage
3	Atlético Madrid	38	23	9	6	67	29	+38	78	Qualification for the Champions League group stage
4	Valencia	38	22	11	5	70	32	+38	77	Qualification for the Champions League play-off round
5	Sevilla	38	23	7	8	71	45	+26	76	Qualification for the Champions League group stage (Note: Sevilla qualified for the Champions League group stage by winning the 2014–15 UEFA Europa League. As a result, the fifth-placed spot for the Europa League group stage they earned was vacated without replacement as per UEFA regulations.)
6	Villarreal	38	16	12	10	48	37	+11	60	Qualification for the Europa League group stage (Note: Since the winners of the 2014–15 Copa del Rey, Barcelona, qualified for European competition based on league position, the spot awarded to the cup winners (Europa League group stage) was passed to the sixth-placed team, and the spot awarded to the sixth-placed team (Europa League third qualifying round) was passed to the seventh-placed team.)

Source: La Liga
Rules for classification: 1) points; 2) head-to-head points; 3) head-to-head goal difference; 4) goal difference; 5) number of goals scored; 6) fair-play points; 7) playoff match

==== Results summary ====
Overall								Home						Away					
Pld	W	D	L	GF	GA	GD	Pts	W	D	L	GF	GA	GD	W	D	L	GF	GA	GD
38	22	11	5	70	32	+38	77	15	3	1	42	10	+32	7	8	4	28	22	+6

Last updated: 24 May 2015.
Source: Competitive matches

==== Results by round ====
Round	1	2	3	4	5	6	7	8	9	10	11	12	13	14	15	16	17	18	19	20	21	22	23	24	25	26	27	28	29	30	31	32	33	34	35	36	37	38
Ground	A	H	H	A	H	A	H	A	H	A	H	A	H	A	H	A	H	A	H	H	A	A	H	A	H	A	H	A	H	A	H	A	H	A	H	A	H	A
Result	D	W	W	W	W	D	W	L	W	W	D	L	L	D	W	W	W	D	W	W	L	W	W	W	W	D	W	W	D	D	W	L	W	D	W	D	D	W
Position	11	2	2	2	1	2	2	4	4	2	3	4	5	5	5	4	4	5	5	4	5	4	4	4	4	4	3	3	4	4	4	4	4	4	4	4	4	4

Updated to match(es) played on 23 May 2015. Source: Competitive matches
A = Away; H = Home; W = Win; D = Draw; L = Loss

==== Matches ====
Win Draw Loss

23 August 2014 1	Sevilla	1–1	Valencia	Seville
21:00 CEST (UTC+02:00)	Vidal 44', (yellow card) 67'; Luismi (yellow card) 90+2'; Carriço (yellow card) 90+2'; Coke (yellow card) 90+6'	Report	Parejo (yellow card) 40'; De Paul (red card) 67'; Alves (yellow card) 73'; Orbán 88'	Stadium: Ramón Sánchez Pizjuán; Attendance: 29,352; Referee: Carlos del Cerro Grande (Community of Madrid)

29 August 2014 2	Valencia	3–0	Málaga	Valencia
22:00 CEST (UTC+02:00)	Gomes (yellow card) 5'; Alcácer 31'; Parejo 45'; Piatti 56'	Report	Darder (red card) 27'; Weligton (yellow card) 45'; Rosales (yellow card) 45'	Stadium: Mestalla; Attendance: 41,550; Referee: Xavier Estrada Fernández (Catalonia)

14 September 2014 3	Valencia	3–1	Espanyol	Valencia
17:00 CEST (UTC+02:00)	Piatti 7'; Parejo 63'; Alcácer 73'; Barragán (yellow card) 82'	Report	Álvaro (yellow card) 75'; García 90+1' (pen.)	Stadium: Mestalla; Attendance: 38,500; Referee: Carlos Clos Gómez (Aragon)

22 September 2014 4	Getafe	0–3	Valencia	Getafe
22:00 CEST (UTC+02:00)	Naldo (yellow card) 18'; Rodríguez (yellow card) 43'; Hinestroza (yellow card) 45'; Valera (yellow card) 58'; Lafita (yellow card) 79'; Diawara (yellow card) 81'	Report	Alcácer 7'; Gomes 20'; Parejo (yellow card) 65'; Rodrigo 72' (pen.), (yellow card) 38' (yellow-red card) 73'	Stadium: Coliseum Alfonso Pérez; Attendance: 6,000; Referee: Alberto Undiano Mallenco (Navarre)

25 September 2014 5	Valencia	3–0	Córdoba	Valencia
22:00 CEST (UTC+02:00)	Alcácer 22'; Gayà 26'; Fuego (yellow card) 36'; Feghouli 73'	Report	Bouzón (yellow card) 31'; Crespo (yellow card) 60'; Fidel (yellow card) 90'	Stadium: Mestalla; Referee: Iñaki Vicandi Garrido (Basque Country)

28 September 2014 6	Real Sociedad	1–1	Valencia	San Sebastián
19:00 CEST (UTC+02:00)	Vela (yellow card); Canales 36'; Bergara (yellow card)	Report	Gil 15'; Otamendi (yellow card) 26'; Gomes (yellow card) 35'; Fuego (yellow card) 65'; Feghouli (yellow card) 71'; Gayà (yellow card) 76'	Stadium: Anoeta; Attendance: 25,168; Referee: Ignacio Iglesias Villanueva (Galicia)

4 October 2014 7	Valencia	3–1	Atlético Madrid	Valencia
16:00 CEST (UTC+02:00)	Miranda 6' (o.g.); Gomes 7', (yellow card) 45'; Otamendi 13'; Parejo (yellow card) 58'; Fuego (yellow card) 74'; Gayà (yellow card) 90+4'	Report	Mandžukić 29'; Cerci (yellow card) 69' (yellow-red card) 90+2'	Stadium: Mestalla; Attendance: 44,000; Referee: Fernando Teixeira Vitienes (Cantabria)

19 October 2014 8	Deportivo La Coruña	3–0	Valencia	A Coruña
17:00 CEST (UTC+02:00)	Mustafi 36' (o.g.); Lucas 43'; Fariña (yellow card) 52'; Juanfran (yellow card) 75'; Toché 79', (yellow card) 86'; Rodríguez (yellow card) 90+3'	Report	Filipe Augusto (yellow card) 35'; Feghouli (yellow card) 71'; Alcácer (yellow card) 77'; Parejo (yellow card) 90'	Stadium: Riazor; Attendance: 21,908; Referee: Xavier Estrada Fernández (Catalonia)

25 October 2014 9	Valencia	3–1	Elche	Valencia
20:00 CEST (UTC+02:00)	Mustafi 13'; Parejo 18'; Lombán 63' (o.g.)	Report	Rodrigues (yellow card) 35'; Mosquera (yellow card) 70'; Jonathas 90+3'	Stadium: Mestalla; Attendance: 42,783; Referee: Alberto Undiano Mallenco (Navarre)

2 November 2014 10	Villarreal	1–3	Valencia	Villarreal
17:00 CET (UTC+01:00)	Mario (yellow card) 54'; Dorado (yellow card) 72'; Trigueros 88'	Report	Trigueros 6' (o.g.); Otamendi (yellow card) 47'; Rodrigo (yellow card) 60'; Mustafi 64', 73'; Gayà (yellow card) 80'	Stadium: El Madrigal; Attendance: 23,000; Referee: Pedro Pérez Montero (Andalusia)

9 November 2014 11	Valencia	0–0	Athletic Bilbao	Valencia
19:00 CET (UTC+01:00)		Report	Balenziaga (yellow card) 71'; Iturraspe (yellow card) 77'	Stadium: Mestalla; Attendance: 39,600; Referee: Carlos del Cerro Grande (Community of Madrid)

23 November 2014 12	Levante	2–1	Valencia	Valencia
17:00 CET (UTC+01:00)	Sissoko (yellow card) 41'; Víctor 58'; Diop (yellow card) 70'; Morales 74'	Report	Mustafi (yellow card) 61'; Parejo 73'	Stadium: Ciutat de València; Attendance: 17,200; Referee: Iñaki Vicandi Garrido (Basque Country)

30 November 2014 13	Valencia	0–1	Barcelona	Valencia
21:00 CET (UTC+01:00)	Barragán (yellow card) 20'; Mustafi (yellow card) 27'; Rodrigo (yellow card) 70'; Otamendi (yellow card) 90+5'	Report	Mathieu (yellow card) 8'; Piqué (yellow card) 20'; Alba (yellow card) 29'; Busquets 90+4'; Messi (yellow card) 90+5'	Stadium: Mestalla; Attendance: 51,200; Referee: David Fernández Borbalán (Andalusia)

7 December 2014 14	Granada	1–1	Valencia	Granada
21:00 CET (UTC+01:00)	Foulquier (yellow card) 30'; Córdoba (yellow card) 40'; Rico (yellow card) 69'; Juan Carlos (yellow card) 87'; Success 89'	Report	Gayà (yellow card) 8'; Parejo (yellow card) 30'; Gomes (yellow card) 37'; Alves (yellow card) 76'; Negredo 83'; Alcácer (red card) 86'	Stadium: Nuevo Los Cármenes; Attendance: 18,300; Referee: Alejandro Hernández Hernández (Las Palmas)

13 December 2014 15	Valencia	3–0	Rayo Vallecano	Valencia
18:00 CET (UTC+01:00)	Gomes (yellow card) 9' (yellow-red card); Feghouli 13', 34'; Piatti 36'; Fuego (yellow card) 54'; Negredo (yellow card) 74'; Filipe Augusto (yellow card) 76'	Report	Morcillo (yellow card) 32'; Bueno (yellow card) 44'; Insúa (yellow card) 65'	Stadium: Mestalla; Attendance: 41,000; Referee: Fernando Teixeira Vitienes (Cantabria)

20 December 2014 16	Eibar	0–1	Valencia	Eibar
20:00 CET (UTC+01:00)	Saúl (yellow card) 32'; Arruabarrena (yellow card) 36'; Capa (yellow card) 44'; Rodríguez (yellow card) 60'; Albentosa (yellow card) 62'; Lillo (yellow card) 84'; Piovaccari (yellow card) 90'	Report	Fuego (yellow card) 30'; Alcácer 31'; Barragán (yellow card) 86'; Alves (yellow card) 90'	Stadium: Ipurua Municipal; Attendance: 4,700; Referee: Carlos Velasco Carballo (Community of Madrid)

4 January 2015 17	Valencia	2–1	Real Madrid	Valencia
17:00 CET (UTC+01:00)	Gayà (yellow card) 23'; Pérez (yellow card) 29'; Mustafi (yellow card) 33'; Alcácer (yellow card) 42'; Parejo (yellow card) 43'; Barragán 52'; Orbán (yellow card) 59'; Otamendi 65'	Report	Ronaldo 14' (pen.); Ramos (yellow card) 15'; Isco (yellow card) 39'; Carvajal (yellow card) 63'	Stadium: Mestalla; Attendance: 50,738; Referee: Jesús Gil Manzano (Extremadura)

10 January 2015 18	Celta Vigo	1–1	Valencia	Vigo
20:00 CET (UTC+01:00)	Charles (yellow card) 29'; Jonny (yellow card) 41'; Orellana 61'; Hernández (yellow card) 84'	Report	Rodrigo (yellow card) 35', (goal) 43'; Parejo (yellow card) 67'; Barragán (yellow card) 71'	Stadium: Balaídos; Attendance: 19,218; Referee: José González González (Castile and León)

17 January 2015 19	Valencia	3–2	Almería	Valencia
18:00 CET (UTC+01:00)	Parejo 11'; Rodrigo 28'; Orbán (yellow card) 57'; Negredo 83'; De Paul (yellow card) 86'	Report	Hemed 13', 33'; Thomas (yellow card) 40'; Dubarbier (yellow card) 81'	Stadium: Mestalla; Attendance: 37,500; Referee: Iñaki Vicandi Garrido (Basque Country)

25 January 2015 20	Valencia	3–1	Sevilla	Valencia
21:00 CET (UTC+01:00)	Parejo 18' (pen.), 32', (yellow card) 32'; Fuego (yellow card) 36', (goal) 56'; Cancelo (yellow card) 40'; Pérez (yellow card) 43'; Gayà (yellow card) 90+1'; Otamendi (yellow card) 90+3'	Report	Figueiras (yellow card) 17'; Bacca 36' (pen.); Banega (yellow card) 59'; Vitolo (yellow card) 65'; Krychowiak (yellow card) 66'; Iborra (yellow card) 90+1'	Stadium: Mestalla; Attendance: 46,704; Referee: Santiago Jaime Latre (Aragon)

2 February 2015 21	Málaga	1–0	Valencia	Málaga
20:45 CET (UTC+01:00)	Castillejo 25'; Camacho (yellow card) 66'; Amrabat (yellow card) 67'; Darder (yellow card) 73'; Weligton (yellow card) 77'; Kameni (yellow card) 79'	Report	Otamendi (yellow card) 36'; Parejo (yellow card) 48'; Cancelo (yellow card) 59' (yellow-red card) 73'; Pérez (yellow card) 90+4'	Stadium: La Rosaleda; Attendance: 20,191; Referee: Carlos Clos Gómez (Aragon)

8 February 2015 22	Espanyol	1–2	Valencia	Cornellà de Llobregat
19:00	Álvarez (yellow card) 56'; Sánchez (yellow card) 61'; Moreno (yellow card) 82'; Montañés (yellow card) 84'; García 89', (yellow card) 90+2'	Report	Pérez (yellow card) 34'; Piatti 63'; Gomes (yellow card) 83'; Parejo 85'; Orbán (yellow card) 90+1'; Negredo (yellow card) 90+2'	Stadium: Cornellà-El Prat; Attendance: 18,752; Referee: Mario Melero López (Andalusia)

15 February 2015 23	Valencia	1–0	Getafe	Valencia
12:00	De Paul (yellow card) 25'; Barragán (yellow card) 27'; Pérez (yellow card) 34'; Negredo 70' (pen.)	Report	Castro (yellow card) 39'; Rodríguez (yellow card) 62'; Escudero (yellow card) 82'	Stadium: Mestalla; Attendance: 48,245; Referee: José González González (Castile and León)

21 February 2015 24	Córdoba	1–2	Valencia	Córdoba
18:00	Héldon (yellow card) 50'; Ghilas 73' (pen.)	Report	Gomes 37'; Gayà (yellow card) 48'; Rodrigo (yellow card) 57'; Piatti 80'	Stadium: Nuevo Arcángel; Attendance: 17,036; Referee: Alberto Undiano Mallenco (Navarre)

1 March 2015 25	Valencia	2–0	Real Sociedad	Valencia
12:00	Mustafi (yellow card) 45+2'; Pérez (yellow card) 45+2'; Piatti 53', 56'; De Paul (yellow card) 88'	Report	G. Elustondo (yellow card) 12'; A. Elustondo (yellow card) 39'; Berchiche (yellow card) 75'	Stadium: Mestalla; Attendance: 47,007; Referee: Xavier Estrada Fernández (Catalonia)

8 March 2015 26	Atlético Madrid	1–1	Valencia	Madrid
21:00 CET (UTC+01:00)	Torres (yellow card) 17'; Koke 33'; Siqueira (yellow card) 57'; Mandžukić (yellow card) 71'; Godín (yellow card) 88'; Suárez (yellow card) 90+2'	Report	Mustafi (yellow card) 31', (goal) 78'; Piatti (yellow card) 34'; Pérez (yellow card) 45+1'; Negredo (yellow card) 50'; Otamendi (yellow card) 56'; Barragán (yellow card) 88'; Fuego (yellow card) 88' (yellow-red card) 90'	Stadium: Vicente Calderón; Attendance: 49,500; Referee: Santiago Jaime Latre (Aragon)

13 March 2015 27	Valencia	2–0	Deportivo La Coruña	Valencia
20:45 CET (UTC+01:00)	Rodrigo (yellow card) 44'; Parejo 60' (pen.); Alcácer 72'	Report	Cavaleiro (yellow card) 22'; Luisinho (yellow card) 27'	Stadium: Mestalla; Attendance: 40,247; Referee: Alfonso Álvarez Izquierdo (Catalonia)

20 March 2015 28	Elche	0–4	Valencia	Elche
20:45 CET (UTC+01:00)	Suárez (yellow card) 4'	Report	Gomes 44'; Alcácer 57'; Roco 71' (o.g.); Otamendi 90+2'	Stadium: Martínez Valero; Attendance: 26,510; Referee: David Fernández Borbalán (Andalusia)

5 April 2015 29	Valencia	0–0	Villarreal	Valencia
17:00 CEST (UTC+02:00)	Parejo (yellow card) 38'; Otamendi (yellow card) 89'	Report	Mario (yellow card) 21'; Vietto (yellow card) 31'; G. Dos Santos (yellow card) 67'; Bailly (yellow card) 87'; Pedraza (yellow card) 90+2'	Stadium: Mestalla; Attendance: 49,545; Referee: Mario Melero López (Andalusia)

9 April 2015 30	Athletic Bilbao	1–1	Valencia	Bilbao
20:00 CEST (UTC+02:00)	Balenziaga (yellow card) 10'; Aduriz (yellow card) 32', (goal) 90'; Beñat (yellow card) 80'; Gurpegui (yellow card) 80'; Iraizoz (yellow card) 83'	Report	Gomes (yellow card) 36'; De Paul 61'; Otamendi (red card) 82'; Alves (yellow card) 83'; Barragán (yellow card) 85'	Stadium: San Mamés; Attendance: 42,666; Referee: Fernando Teixeira Vitienes (Cantabria)

13 April 2015 31	Valencia	3–0	Levante	Valencia
20:30 CEST (UTC+02:00)	Alcácer 16'; Mustafi (yellow card) 21'; Parejo (yellow card) 34'; Feghouli 36'; Negredo (yellow card) 75', (goal) 90+3'	Report	José Mari (yellow card) 21'; Simão Mate (yellow card) 61'; Ramis (yellow card) 90+3'	Stadium: Mestalla; Attendance: 41,935; Referee: Ignacio Iglesias Villanueva (Galicia)

19 April 2015 32	Barcelona	2–0	Valencia	Barcelona
16:00 CEST (UTC+02:00)	Suárez 1'; Adriano (yellow card) 27'; Mascherano (yellow card) 54'; Rakitić (yellow card) 77'; Bravo (yellow card) 90+1'; Messi 90+4'	Report	Fuego (yellow card) 28'; Orbán (yellow card) 35'; Otamendi (yellow card) 66'; Mustafi (yellow card) 79'	Stadium: Camp Nou; Attendance: 92,915; Referee: José González González (Castile and León)

26 April 2015 33	Valencia	4–0	Granada	Valencia
20:45 CEST (UTC+02:00)	Fuego 26'; Gayà (yellow card) 32'; Parejo 40' (pen.), (yellow card) 56'; Feghouli (yellow card) 85', (goal) 85'; Negredo 88'	Report	Insúa (yellow card) 45'; Nyom (yellow card) 71'; Rico (yellow card) 74'	Stadium: Mestalla; Attendance: 36,763; Referee: Alberto Undiano Mallenco (Navarre)

29 April 2015 34	Rayo Vallecano	1–1	Valencia	Madrid
20:00 CEST (UTC+02:00)	Embarba 19'; Morcillo (red card) 62'; Toño (yellow card) 63'; Fatau (yellow card) 80'	Report	Parejo 66'; Feghouli (yellow card) 74'; Rodrigo (red card) 77'	Stadium: Campo de Vallecas; Attendance: 9,960; Referee: Iñaki Vicandi Garrido (Basque Country)

3 May 2015 35	Valencia	3–1	Eibar	Valencia
19:00 CEST (UTC+02:00)	Otamendi 25'; Parejo 56'; Alcácer 71'; Piatti (yellow card) 88'; Gomes (yellow card) 89'	Report	García (yellow card) 70'; Arruabarrena 84'	Stadium: Mestalla; Attendance: 39,320; Referee: Javier Estrada Fernández (Catalonia)

9 May 2015 36	Real Madrid	2–2	Valencia	Madrid
20:00 CEST (UTC+02:00)	Arbeloa (yellow card) 25'; Hernández (yellow card) 45+1'; Pepe (yellow card) 48', (goal) 56'; Ramos (yellow card) 58'; Isco 84'	Report	Gayà (yellow card) 16'; Alcácer 19'; Fuego 26'; Otamendi (yellow card) 58'; Gomes (yellow card) 73'; Parejo (yellow card) 90+1'	Stadium: Santiago Bernabéu; Attendance: 76,000; Referee: Carlos Clos Gómez (Aragon)

17 May 2015 37	Valencia	1–1	Celta Vigo	Valencia
19:00 CEST (UTC+02:00)	Mustafi (yellow card) 38'; Otamendi 71'	Report	Hernández 8'; Cabral (yellow card) 27'; Nolito (yellow card) 62'; Krohn-Dehli (yellow card) 78'; Fernández (yellow card) 86'; Mallo (yellow card) 90+4'	Stadium: Mestalla; Attendance: 44,498; Referee: Jesús Gil Manzano (Extremadura)

23 May 2015 38	Almería	2–3	Valencia	Almería
18:30 CEST (UTC+02:00)	Thomas 9'; Soriano 37'; Casado (yellow card) 68'; Silva (yellow card) 75'	Report	Otamendi 28'; Barragán (yellow card) 34'; Feghouli 45', (yellow card) 75'; Parejo (yellow card) 69' (yellow-red card) 89'; Alcácer 80'; Gayà (yellow card) 86'; Fuego (yellow card) 90+2'	Stadium: Juego Mediterráneos; Attendance: 11,429; Referee: Alejandro Hernández Hernández (Las Palmas)

=== Copa del Rey ===
==== Round of 32 ====
4 December 2014 First leg	Rayo Vallecano	1–2	Valencia	Madrid
22:00	Pozuelo (yellow card) 24'; Moreno 36'; Licá (yellow card) 61'	Report	Filipe Augusto (yellow card) 38'; Alcácer 70'; Yoel (yellow card) 83'; De Paul 85', (yellow card) 86'; Cancelo (yellow card) 87'	Stadium: Campo de Vallecas; Attendance: 8,551; Referee: Mario Melero López

16 December 2014 Second leg	Valencia	4–4 (6–5 agg.)	Rayo Vallecano	Valencia
20:00 CET	Alcácer 8', 65'; Gomes (yellow card) 19'; Morcillo 46' (o.g.); Parejo (yellow card) 67'; Rodrigo 71', (yellow card) 71' (red card) 81'; De Paul (yellow card) 86'	Report	Jozabed 20'; Pozuelo 23'; Baena (yellow card) 30'; Pereira (yellow card) 38', (goal) 38'; Nacho (yellow card) 45'; Toño (yellow card) 46'; Embarba 61'; Álvarez (yellow card) 71'; Morcillo (yellow card) 71'	Stadium: Mestalla; Attendance: 23,600; Referee: Santiago Jaime Latre

==== Round of 16 ====
7 January 2015 First Leg	Valencia	2–1	Espanyol	Valencia
22:00 CET	Gayà 11'; Negredo 86' (pen.); Vezo (yellow card) 89'	Summary	Abraham (yellow card) 53'; Stuani 60'; Álvaro (yellow card) 85'; García (yellow card) 90'	Stadium: Mestalla; Attendance: 35,000; Referee: Alberto Undiano Mallenco

13 January 2015 Second Leg	Espanyol	2–0 (3–2 agg.)	Valencia	Cornellà de Llobregat
20:00 CET	Cañas (yellow card) 5'; Álvarez (yellow card) 45'; Caicedo 79', 89', (yellow card) 80'	Report	Mustafi (red card) 14'; Vezo (yellow card) 37'; De Paul (yellow card) 51'; Barragán (yellow card) 79'	Stadium: Cornellà-El Prat; Referee: Ignacio Iglesias Villanueva

== Statistics ==
=== Appearances and goals ===
No.	Pos	Nat	Player	Total		La Liga		Copa del Rey	
No.	Pos	Nat	Player	Apps	Goals	Apps	Goals	Apps	Goals
Goalkeepers
1	GK	(Brazil) BRA	Diego Alves	37	0	37	0	0	0
13	GK	(Spain) ESP	Yoel	6	0	1+1	0	4	0
Defenders
2	DF	(Portugal) POR	João Cancelo	13	0	5+5	0	3	0
3	DF	(Portugal) POR	Rúben Vezo	10	0	6+1	0	3	0
5	DF	(Germany) GER	Shkodran Mustafi	36	4	33	4	3	0
6	DF	(Argentina) ARG	Lucas Orbán	26	1	8+14	1	3+1	0
19	DF	(Spain) ESP	Antonio Barragán	36	1	32+2	1	1+1	0
23	DF	(Argentina) ARG	Nicolás Otamendi	38	6	35	6	3	0
31	DF	(Spain) ESP	José Luis Gayà	37	2	32+3	1	2	1
Midfielders
4	MF	(Brazil) BRA	Filipe Augusto	8	0	1+5	0	2	0
8	MF	(Algeria) ALG	Sofiane Feghouli	33	6	20+13	6	0	0
10	MF	(Spain) ESP	Dani Parejo	37	11	33+1	11	2+1	0
11	MF	(Argentina) ARG	Pablo Piatti	30	7	26+2	7	1+1	0
15	MF	(Argentina) ARG	Enzo Pérez	15	0	12+2	0	1	0
17	MF	(Spain) ESP	Rodrigo	32	4	24+7	3	1	1
18	MF	(Spain) ESP	Javi Fuego	38	3	34+1	3	3	0
20	MF	(Argentina) ARG	Rodrigo De Paul	29	2	6+19	1	3+1	1
21	MF	(Portugal) POR	André Gomes	37	4	31+2	4	2+2	0
28	MF	(Spain) ESP	Tropi	1	0	0+1	0	0	0
Forwards
7	FW	(Spain) ESP	Álvaro Negredo	34	6	14+16	5	1+3	1
9	FW	(Spain) ESP	Paco Alcácer	36	14	26+6	11	3+1	3
Players transferred out during the season
12	DF	(Portugal) POR	João Pereira	0	0	0	0	0	0
16	MF	(Argentina) ARG	Bruno Zuculini	1	0	0+1	0	0	0
22	MF	(Spain) ESP	Carles Gil	11	1	2+6	1	3	0
27	MF	(Spain) ESP	Robert Ibáñez	5	0	0+4	0	0+1	0

Last updated: 30 May 2015
Source: BDFutbol

=== Goalscorers ===
This includes all competitive matches. The list is sorted by shirt number when total goals are equal.

Rank	Pos	No.	Nat	Name	La Liga	Copa del Rey	Total
1	FW	9	(Spain)	Paco Alcácer	7	3	10
2	MF	10	(Spain)	Dani Parejo	9	0	12
3	MF	11	(Argentina)	Pablo Piatti	7	0	7
4	DF	5	(Germany)	Shkodran Mustafi	4	0	4
4	FW	7	(Spain)	Álvaro Negredo	3	1	4
4	FW	17	(Spain)	Rodrigo	3	1	4
4	MF	21	(Portugal)	André Gomes	4	0	4
8	MF	8	(Algeria)	Sofiane Feghouli	3	0	3
8	DF	23	(Argentina)	Nicolás Otamendi	3	0	3
10	DF	31	(Spain)	José Luis Gayà	1	1	2
11	DF	6	(Argentina)	Lucas Orbán	1	0	1
11	MF	18	(Spain)	Javi Fuego	1	0	1
11	DF	19	(Spain)	Antonio Barragán	1	0	1
11	MF	20	(Argentina)	Rodrigo De Paul	0	1	1
11	MF	22	(Spain)	Carles Gil	1	0	1
OWN GOALS					4	1	5
TOTALS					52	8	60

Last updated on 21 March 2015
