= Paco Alcácer =

Spanish footballer (born 1993)

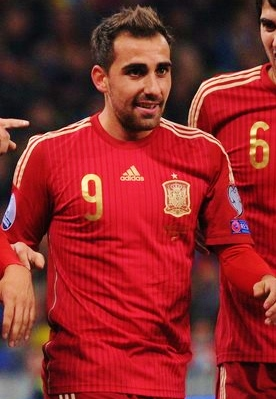
- Alcácer with Spain in 2015

Personal information
- Full name: Francisco Alcácer García
- Date of birth: 30 August 1993 (age 33)
- Place of birth: Torrent, Spain
- Height: 1.75 m (5 ft 9 in)
- Position: Striker

Youth career
- 2000–2003: Monte-Sión
- 2003–2005: Torrent
- 2005–2009: Valencia

Senior career*
Years	Team	Apps	(Gls)
2009–2012	Valencia B	64	(42)
2010–2016	Valencia	93	(30)
2012–2013	→ Getafe (loan)	20	(3)
2016–2019	Barcelona	37	(10)
2018–2019	→ Borussia Dortmund (loan)	14	(12)
2019–2020	Borussia Dortmund	23	(11)
2020–2022	Villarreal	58	(11)
2022–2025	Sharjah	34	(9)
2023–2024	→ Emirates (loan)	22	(8)
Total		365	(136)

International career
2009	Spain U16	3	(0)
2009–2010	Spain U17	11	(14)
2011	Spain U18	3	(5)
2011–2012	Spain U19	16	(7)
2013	Spain U20	7	(3)
2013	Spain U21	1	(0)
2014–2019	Spain	19	(12)
Medal record
UEFA European Under-19 Championship
Winner	2011 Romania
Winner	2012 Estonia
UEFA European Under-17 Championship
Runner-up	2010 Liechtenstein
- * Club domestic league appearances and goals

Francisco "Paco" Alcácer García (Spanish pronunciation: [ˈpako alˈkaθeɾ]; born 30 August 1993) is a Spanish former professional footballer who played as a striker.

Having come through the Valencia youth ranks, he started playing with the first team in 2010, and became a regular following a loan at Getafe, scoring 43 goals in 124 competitive matches. In 2016 he signed for Barcelona for €30 million, winning two Copa del Rey trophies and the 2017–18 La Liga during his spell as a reserve to Luis Suárez before leaving for Borussia Dortmund on loan. He signed a permanent deal in Germany in early 2019 after a successful start. He returned to Spain in January 2020, winning the 2020–21 UEFA Europa League with Villarreal. He joined Emirati club Sharjah in 2022, being loaned to Emirates whilst under contract and retiring in 2026.

Alcácer won the European Championship twice with Spain's under-19 side, and made his senior international debut in 2014. He scored 12 goals in 19 full appearances.

== Club career ==
=== Valencia ===
==== Senior debut ====
Born in Torrent, Valencian Community, Alcácer was a product of Valencia's youth system. He made his senior debut in the 2009–10 season aged only 16, scoring three goals in 15 games with the reserve side and suffering relegation from Segunda División B.

On 11 November 2010, Alcácer appeared in his first match with the first team, playing the full 90 minutes in a 4–1 home win against UD Logroñés – 7–1 on aggregate – in the Copa del Rey (the fixture was also Isco's senior bow). During that season, he netted 27 times to help the B's to return to the third tier as champions.

==== 2011–12 season ====
On 12 August 2011, after Alcácer had scored the third and final goal in a 3–0 friendly win over Roma and was leaving the Mestalla Stadium accompanied by his parents, his father fell to the ground after suffering a heart attack; despite 30 minutes of efforts by medics to revive him, the 44-year-old died. He returned to training less than a week later for "therapy purposes", and played the entirety of a fixture with the reserves three days after that.

Alcácer made his La Liga debut for Valencia on 14 January 2012, coming on as a substitute for Sofiane Feghouli for the last 20 minutes of a 1–0 away loss against Real Sociedad. He made two other brief appearances from the bench, whilst scoring at the rate of one goal every two games with the B team.

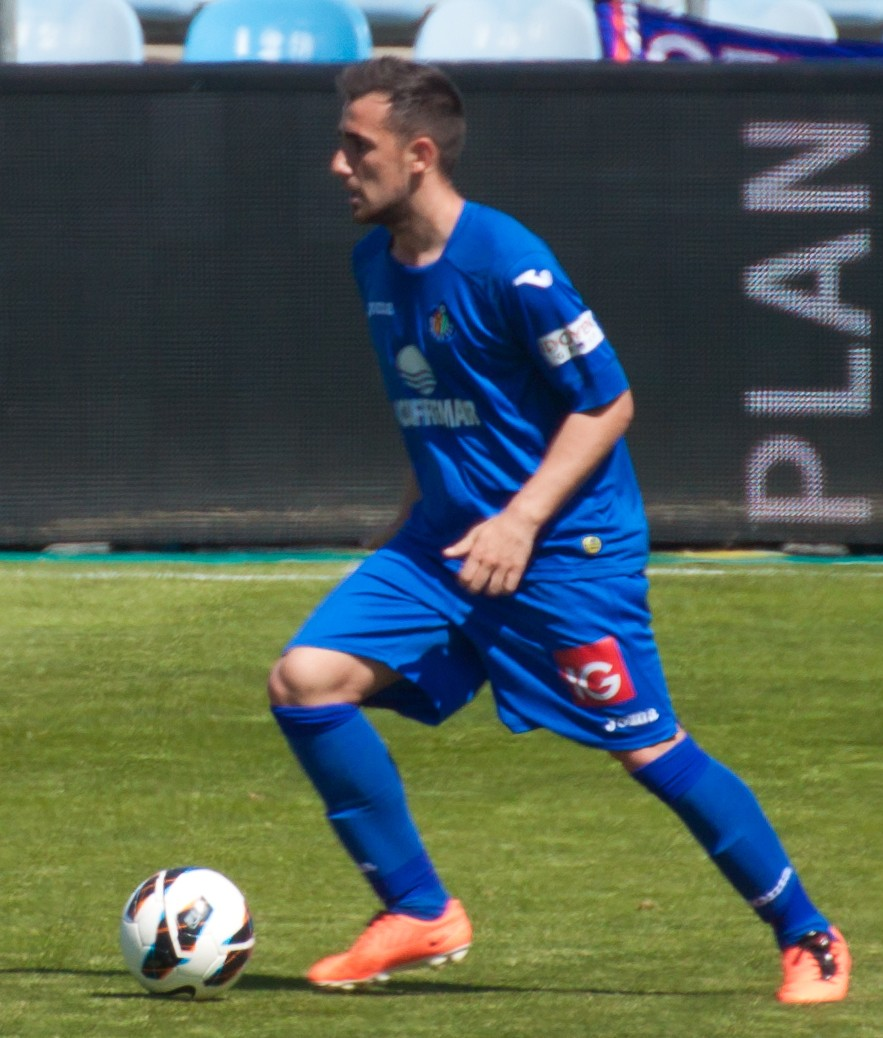
Alcácer in action for Getafe in 2013

==== Loan to Getafe ====
Alcácer went on loan to Getafe for 2012–13, his first official game being against Deportivo de La Coruña where he played 20 minutes in an eventual 1–1 away draw. He scored his first goal in the top division on 7 January 2013, but in a 3–1 defeat at Rayo Vallecano.

During his spell in Madrid, Alcácer netted four times in total.

==== 2013–14 season ====
After returning to Valencia, Alcácer scored his first senior goal for his formative club on 3 October 2013, during an away game against Kuban Krasnodar in the group stage of the UEFA Europa League. He first found the net for Los Che in the domestic league on 25 January 2014 in a 2–2 home draw with Espanyol, and grabbed another the following matchday, scoring the 3–2 winner at the Camp Nou against Barcelona.

On 10 April 2014, Alcácer scored the first hat-trick of his professional career, helping overturn a 3–0 first-leg deficit to beat Basel 5–0 at home and qualify for the semi-finals of the Europa League. It was his 14th competitive goal of the campaign, and his seventh in continental competition; this European haul made him the edition's second-highest scorer after compatriot Jonathan Soriano, who netted eight for Red Bull Salzburg.

==== 2014–15 season ====
On 17 August 2014, Alcácer scored the first goal in a 2–1 home victory over Milan for the Orange Trophy, through a long-range shot, and was assigned the number ′9′ jersey for 2014–15, previously worn by Hélder Postiga. On 9 December, near the end of a 1–1 draw at Granada, he was given a straight red card for striking Juan Carlos.

On 27 January 2015, it was revealed that Alcácer extended his contract until 2020 and his buyout clause had been raised to €80 million.

==== 2015–16 season ====
On 7 November 2015, Alcácer and Dani Parejo scored twice each in a 5–1 win away to third-place Celta. The following 21 January, the latter was stripped of his captaincy in favour of the former by manager Gary Neville, after a poor run of results.

After three months without a goal, Alcácer broke his barren spell with a hat-trick in a 4–0 home defeat of Eibar on 20 April 2016. He finished the season with 15 in all competitions, in an eventual 12th-place finish.

=== Barcelona ===
On 30 August 2016, Alcácer signed for Barcelona for €30 million on a five-year deal, and on the same day Munir El Haddadi went in the other direction on loan, to be replaced by the former as the team's fourth-choice forward behind Lionel Messi, Neymar and Luis Suárez. He made his debut on 10 September in a 2–1 home loss to Alavés, making only eight passes in 66 minutes before being substituted by Suárez.

Alcácer scored his first official goal for the Blaugrana on 21 December 2016, helping with the fifth in a 7–0 home rout of Hércules to see his team qualify for the round of 16 in the Spanish Cup. The following 4 February, he netted a first league goal for his new team in a 3–0 home victory against Athletic Bilbao, starting in place of the rested Suárez.

Filling in for the suspended Suárez, Alcácer played the full 90 minutes in the domestic cup final, scoring Barcelona's last goal in the 3–1 defeat of Alavés. On 5 November 2017, he netted a brace in a 2–1 home win against Sevilla that kept his team four points clear at the top of the league table. He scored his first goal for the club in the UEFA Champions League one month later, helping to a 2–0 group stage victory over Sporting CP.

=== Borussia Dortmund ===
On 28 August 2018, Alcácer joined Bundesliga team Borussia Dortmund on a season-long loan with an option to buy. He made his debut on 14 September, replacing Maximilian Philipp midway through the second half of the home fixture against Eintracht Frankfurt and scored the final goal in a 3–1 win. He added five goals coming off the bench in his next two matches, two late goals to seal a 4–2 victory at Bayer Leverkusen, and a hat-trick in a 4–3 defeat of FC Augsburg at the Westfalenstadion in which he won the game with a free kick in the last minute.

On 18 December 2018, Alcácer scored his tenth goal from the bench for the season in a 2–1 away loss to Fortuna Düsseldorf, and in doing so set a new Bundesliga record for the most goals scored in a single campaign by a substitute. The club exercised their option to sign him permanently for €23 million on 1 February 2019, and he signed a five-year contract.

Alcácer finished 2018–19 with 18 league goals, trailing only Bayern Munich's Robert Lewandowski for top scorer, but lost his place the following January after the signing of Erling Haaland. He won his only trophy on 3 August 2019, opening the scoring in a 2–0 win over Bayern in the DFL-Supercup.

=== Villarreal ===
Alcácer returned to Spain's top flight on 30 January 2020, agreeing to a five-and-a-half-year deal at Villarreal and becoming the club's most expensive signing ever in the process at €25 million. He scored on his debut against Osasuna, helping the hosts to win 3–1.

Alcácer netted six times for the 2020–21 Europa League winners, playing the last 13 minutes of the second half and converting his attempt in the penalty shootout victory over Manchester United in the final.

=== Sharjah ===
On 17 August 2022, Alcácer was due to join UAE Pro League club Sharjah on a season-long loan. Two days later, however, after terminating his contract with Villarreal by mutual consent, he signed a permanent three-year deal. He made his debut on 3 September, concluding a 2–0 win at Shabab Al Ahli. On 21 October, his free kick was the only goal of the final of the UAE President's Cup – delayed for six months after the death of Sheikh Khalifa – against Al Wahda, ending his team's 19-year drought in the tournament.

Alcácer was loaned to Emirates Club in the same league on 15 September 2023. Having returned to Sharjah, he did not feature at all for them since January 2025, leaving in June and announcing his retirement on 11 March 2026 aged 32.

== International career ==
Alcácer represented Spain at all youth levels. With the under-17 side, he reached the final at the 2010 UEFA European Championship, playing alongside Valencia teammate Juan Bernat and being crowned the competition's top scorer with six goals, his 14 including qualifiers setting a new record; additionally, he won the European Under-19 Championship twice, in 2011 and 2012.

On 29 August 2014, Alcácer was named by full side manager Vicente del Bosque in a 23-man squad for matches against France and Macedonia in September, making his debut on 4 September after replacing Diego Costa midway through the second half of an eventual 1–0 friendly loss to the former. Profiting from Costa's injury, he made his first start four days later, against Macedonia at the Estadi Ciutat de València, scoring his team's second goal in a 5–1 victory for the UEFA Euro 2016 qualifiers and also providing the assist for Sergio Busquets' third. In their next qualifier, away to Slovakia on 9 October, the substitute scored an 82nd-minute equaliser, although Spain went on to lose 2–1.

A year later to the day, as a first-half replacement for the injured Álvaro Morata, Alcácer scored twice in a 4–0 win over Luxembourg which sealed qualification, and he finished the qualification campaign with five goals, the most by a Spanish player. He was not selected for the final tournament in France, however.

In October 2018, amidst a good start to his spell at Dortmund and more than two years after his last international appearance, Alcácer was called back by new manager Luis Enrique for the games against Wales and England. He scored a brace in the first match, a 4–1 friendly victory in Cardiff. Spain lost 2–3 in the second, but he came on as a substitute in the second half and scored with his first touch of the ball, through a glancing header into the far post corner of the goal which beat Jordan Pickford.

== Career statistics ==
=== Club ===
Appearances and goals by club, season and competition
Club	Season	League			National cup (Note: Includes Copa del Rey, DFB-Pokal, UAE President's Cup)		Continental		Other		Total	
Club	Season	Division	Apps	Goals	Apps	Goals	Apps	Goals	Apps	Goals	Apps	Goals
Valencia B	2009–10	Segunda División B	15	3	—		—		—		15	3
Valencia B	2010–11	Tercera División	25	27	—		—		2 (Note: Appearances in Tercera División play-offs)	1	27	28
Valencia B	2011–12	Segunda División B	24	12	—		—		—		24	12
Valencia B	Total		64	42	—		—		2	1	66	43
Valencia	2010–11	La Liga	0	0	1	0	0	0	—		1	0
Valencia	2011–12	La Liga	3	0	0	0	0	0	—		3	0
Valencia	2013–14	La Liga	23	6	3	1	11 (Note: Appearances in UEFA Europa League)	7	—		37	14
Valencia	2014–15	La Liga	32	11	4	3	—		—		36	14
Valencia	2015–16	La Liga	34	13	3	2	9 (Note: Seven appearances in UEFA Champions League, two appearances in UEFA Europa League)	0	—		46	15
Valencia	2016–17	La Liga	1	0	0	0	0	0	—		1	0
Valencia	Total		93	30	11	6	20	7	0	0	124	43
Getafe (loan)	2012–13	La Liga	20	3	3	1	—		—		23	4
Barcelona	2016–17	La Liga	20	6	4	2	3 (Note: Appearances in UEFA Champions League)	0	0	0	27	8
Barcelona	2017–18	La Liga	17	4	3	2	2	1	1 (Note: Appearance in Supercopa de España)	0	23	7
Barcelona	Total		37	10	7	4	5	1	1	0	50	15
Borussia Dortmund (loan)	2018–19	Bundesliga	14	12	0	0	4	1	—		18	13
Borussia Dortmund	2018–19	Bundesliga	12	6	1	0	1	0	—		14	6
Borussia Dortmund	2019–20	Bundesliga	11	5	1	1	2	0	1 (Note: Appearance in DFL-Supercup)	1	15	7
Borussia Dortmund	Dortmund total		37	23	2	1	7	1	1	1	47	26
Villarreal	2019–20	La Liga	13	4	1	0	—		—		14	4
Villarreal	2020–21	La Liga	27	6	2	0	10	6	—		39	12
Villarreal	2021–22	La Liga	18	1	2	3	3	1	0	0	23	5
Villarreal	Total		58	11	5	3	13	7	0	0	76	21
Sharjah	2022–23	UAE Pro League	25	8	5	1	—		5 (Note: Appearances in UAE League Cup)	0	35	9
Sharjah	2023–24	UAE Pro League	2	1	0	0	1	0	0	0	3	1
Sharjah	2024–25	UAE Pro League	7	0	0	0	4	1	3 (Note: Appearances in UAE League Cup)	0	14	1
Sharjah	Total		34	9	5	1	5	1	8	0	56	11
Emirates	2023–24	UAE Pro League	22	8	1	0	0	0	0	0	23	8
Career total			365	136	34	16	50	16	12	2	461	171

=== International ===
Appearances and goals by national team and year
National team	Year	Apps	Goals
Spain	2014	5	3
Spain	2015	6	3
Spain	2016	2	0
Spain	2017	0	0
Spain	2018	2	3
Spain	2019	4	3
Total		19	12

Spain score listed first, score column indicates score after each Alcácer goal.

List of international goals scored by Paco Alcácer
No.	Date	Venue	Opponent	Score	Result	Competition
1.	8 September 2014	Ciutat de València, Valencia, Spain	Macedonia	2–0	5–1	UEFA Euro 2016 qualifying
2.	9 October 2014	Štadión pod Dubňom, Žilina, Slovakia	Slovakia	1–1	1–2	UEFA Euro 2016 qualifying
3.	12 October 2014	Josy Barthel, Luxembourg, Luxembourg	Luxembourg	2–0	4–0	UEFA Euro 2016 qualifying
4.	11 June 2015	Reino de León, León, Spain	Costa Rica	1–1	2–1	Friendly
5.	9 October 2015	Las Gaunas, Logroño, Spain	Luxembourg	2–0	4–0	UEFA Euro 2016 qualifying
6.	9 October 2015	Las Gaunas, Logroño, Spain	Luxembourg	3–0	4–0	UEFA Euro 2016 qualifying
7.	11 October 2018	Millennium Stadium, Cardiff, Wales	Wales	1–0	4–1	Friendly
8.	11 October 2018	Millennium Stadium, Cardiff, Wales	Wales	3–0	4–1	Friendly
9.	15 October 2018	Benito Villamarín, Seville, Spain	England	1–3	2–3	2018–19 UEFA Nations League A
10.	5 September 2019	Arena Națională, Bucharest, Romania	Romania	2–0	2–1	UEFA Euro 2020 qualifying
11.	8 September 2019	El Molinón, Gijón, Spain	Faroe Islands	3–0	4–0	UEFA Euro 2020 qualifying
12.	8 September 2019	El Molinón, Gijón, Spain	Faroe Islands	4–0	4–0	UEFA Euro 2020 qualifying

== Honours ==
Valencia Mestalla

- Tercera División: 2010–11

Barcelona

- La Liga: 2017–18
- Copa del Rey: 2016–17, 2017–18

Borussia Dortmund

- DFL-Supercup: 2019

Villarreal

- UEFA Europa League: 2020–21

Sharjah

- UAE President's Cup: 2021–22, 2022–23
- UAE Super Cup: 2022

Spain U19

- UEFA European Under-19 Championship: 2011, 2012

Individual

- UEFA European Under-19 Championship Team of the Tournament: 2012
