= Dani Parejo =

Spanish footballer (born 1989)

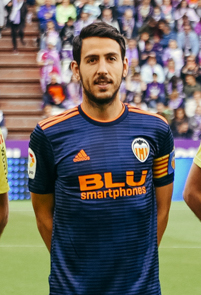
- Parejo with Valencia in 2019

Personal information
- Full name: Daniel Parejo Muñoz
- Date of birth: 16 April 1989 (age 37)
- Place of birth: Coslada, Spain
- Height: 1.82 m (6 ft 0 in)
- Position: Central midfielder

Youth career
- 1998–2000: Coslada
- 2000–2003: Espinilla
- 2003–2006: Real Madrid

Senior career*
Years	Team	Apps	(Gls)
2006–2008	Real Madrid B	37	(11)
2008–2009	Real Madrid	5	(0)
2008	→ Queens Park Rangers (loan)	14	(0)
2009–2011	Getafe	64	(9)
2011–2020	Valencia	282	(54)
2020–2026	Villarreal	207	(15)

International career
2006–2008	Spain U19	13	(3)
2009	Spain U20	11	(1)
2008–2011	Spain U21	19	(5)
2018–2019	Spain	4	(0)
Medal record
Men's football
Representing Spain
UEFA European Under-21 Championship
Winner	2011 Denmark	Team
UEFA European Under-19 Championship
Winner	2007 Austria	Team
- * Club domestic league appearances and goals as of 21:35, 24 May 2026 (UTC)

Daniel Parejo Muñoz (Spanish pronunciation: [daˈnjel ˈdani paˈɾexo]; born 16 April 1989) is a Spanish professional footballer who plays as a central midfielder.

After starting out at Real Madrid, who loaned him to Queens Park Rangers in England for four months, he first made a name in La Liga with Getafe. Transferring to Valencia in 2011, he went on to appear in 383 official matches for the latter club and win the 2019 Copa del Rey. He signed with Villarreal in August 2020, making 270 appearances and claiming the 2021 Europa League.

Across all youth levels, Parejo won 43 caps for Spain and scored nine goals. He made his full debut in 2018, at the age of 28.

== Club career ==
=== Real Madrid ===
Born in Coslada, Community of Madrid, Parejo was a product of Real Madrid's youth academy, joining at the age of 14. He was called on several occasions by first-team coach Bernd Schuster to train with the seniors and, during the 2006–07 season, played four games for Real Madrid Castilla in Segunda División.

On 4 August 2008, Parejo signed a one-year loan deal with Championship club Queens Park Rangers, and made his debut five days later, coming off the bench in a 2–1 win against Barnsley at Loftus Road, going on to total 18 official appearances. On 17 December, Real Madrid officially recalled the player from his loan effective 1 January 2009, after first-team midfielders Rubén de la Red and Mahamadou Diarra were both out for the campaign with various physical problems.

Parejo was given the squad number 17, which had previously been assigned to Ruud van Nistelrooy, who was also out for several months due to a serious injury. He appeared little during the season, his first match being the 4–0 La Liga away victory over Sporting de Gijón on 15 February as he replaced Sergio Ramos for the final ten minutes.

=== Getafe ===
In late July 2009, as Esteban Granero was re-bought from Getafe, Parejo went in the opposite direction with Real, as in Granero's case, having a similar option. On 25 March 2010, he scored against his former club after stealing the ball from goalkeeper Iker Casillas, but the hosts lost 4–2. Having to compete for a starting berth in central midfield with coach Míchel's son, Adrián – a former teammate in Real Madrid B – he nevertheless contributed solidly during the campaign as they qualified for the second time in their history for the UEFA Europa League.

Parejo appeared more in 2010–11 (36 matches), but the Madrid outskirts side only narrowly avoided relegation.

=== Valencia ===
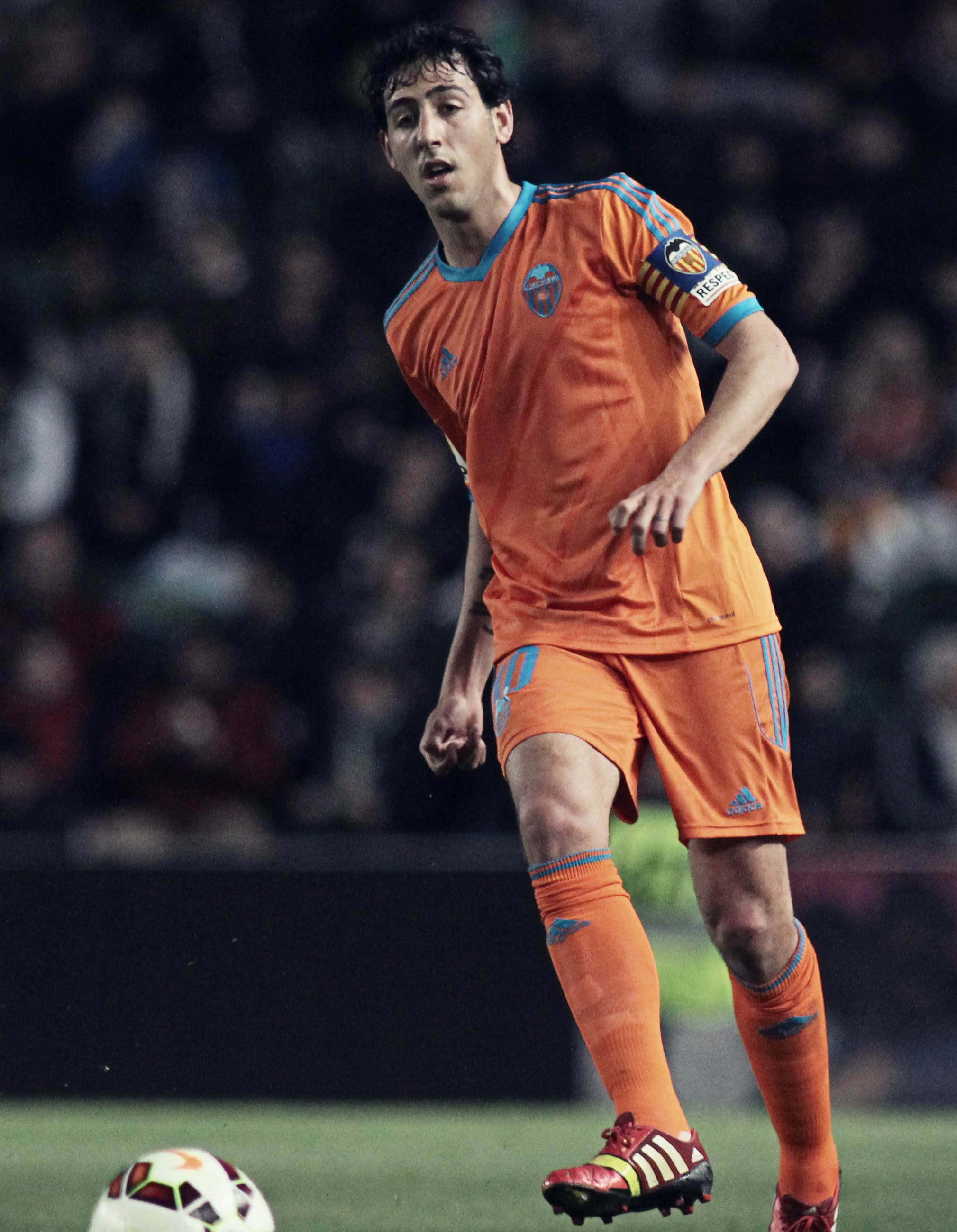
Parejo playing for Valencia in 2015

On 14 June 2011, Valencia signed Parejo for a reported €6 million, with out-of-favour goalkeeper Miguel Ángel Moyá going to Getafe on a year-long loan as part of the deal. He made his league debut on 15 August, playing 80 minutes in a 1–1 away draw with Mallorca.

Parejo was quickly deemed surplus to requirements at his new club, his situation not improving even after the serious injury suffered by Sergio Canales, who played in his same position. He bounced back, however, for 2012–13, scoring twice in 36 official games in an eventual fifth-place finish.

In the following years, Parejo was an undisputed starter for several managers. In the 2014–15 season, his first as captain, he scored a career-best 12 goals, being one of the best scorers in the competition from the midfielder position. In the process, he also became the first Valencia midfielder to score ten or more goals since Vicente in 2003–04.

Parejo and Paco Alcácer each scored twice in a 5–1 win away to third-place Celta de Vigo on 7 November 2015; his first came just before half-time, through a free kick to put the visitors ahead 2–1. However, in January, after a poor run of form, the former was stripped of his captaincy in favour of the latter by manager Gary Neville. He was reinstated in that position by Marcelino García Toral ahead of the 2017–18 campaign.

Parejo lifted the Copa del Rey on 25 May 2019, after a 2–1 defeat of Barcelona in the final.

=== Villarreal ===
On 12 August 2020, Parejo joined Villarreal on a free transfer and a four-year contract. He moved to the local rivals alongside his teammate Francis Coquelin, a move which caused fury from Valencia's fans towards their chairman Peter Lim.

Parejo won the Europa League in his first season at the Estadio de la Cerámica. In the final, he took the free kick that Gerard Moreno finished for Villarreal's goal in a 1–1 draw against Manchester United, and also scored in the 11–10 penalty shootout victory.

On 21 May 2026, aged 37, Parejo announced he would leave at the end of the campaign after six years with the club.

== International career ==
Parejo was named in the Spain under-19 team for the 2007 UEFA European Championship. In the tournament held in Austria, he scored the final winner against Greece (1–0).

Parejo was promoted to the under-21 team the following year, appearing in several qualification matches for the 2009 European Championship. He won his first cap for the senior team on 27 March 2018, replacing Thiago Alcântara late into the 6–1 friendly defeat of Argentina.

== Career statistics ==
=== Club ===
As of match played 24 May 2026

Appearances and goals by club, season and competition
Club	Season	League			National cup (Note: Includes Copa del Rey)		League cup (Note: Includes Football League Cup)		Europe		Other		Total	
Club	Season	Division	Apps	Goals	Apps	Goals	Apps	Goals	Apps	Goals	Apps	Goals	Apps	Goals
Real Madrid B	2006–07	Segunda División	4	1	—		—		—		—		4	1
Real Madrid B	2007–08	Segunda División B	33	10	—		—		—		—		33	10
Real Madrid B	Total		37	11	—		—		—		—		37	11
Real Madrid	2008–09	La Liga	5	0	0	0	—		0	0	—		5	0
Queens Park Rangers (loan)	2008–09	Championship	14	0	0	0	4	0	—		—		18	0
Getafe	2009–10	La Liga	28	6	8	1	—		—		—		36	7
Getafe	2010–11	La Liga	36	3	3	0	—		5 (Note: Appearances in UEFA Europa League)	1	—		44	4
Getafe	Total		64	9	11	1	0	0	5	1	0	0	80	11
Valencia	2011–12	La Liga	16	0	6	0	—		8 (Note: Three appearances in UEFA Champions League, five appearances in UEFA Europa League)	0	—		30	0
Valencia	2012–13	La Liga	27	1	4	1	—		5 (Note: Appearances in UEFA Champions League)	0	—		36	2
Valencia	2013–14	La Liga	31	4	4	0	—		11	1	—		46	5
Valencia	2014–15	La Liga	34	12	3	0	—		—		—		37	12
Valencia	2015–16	La Liga	33	8	6	1	—		11 (Note: Eight appearances and one goal in UEFA Champions League, three appearances and one goal in UEFA Europa League)	2	—		50	11
Valencia	2016–17	La Liga	36	5	3	1	—		—		—		39	6
Valencia	2017–18	La Liga	34	7	8	1	—		—		—		42	8
Valencia	2018–19	La Liga	36	9	8	0	—		12 (Note: Five appearances in UEFA Champions League, seven appearances and one goal in UEFA Europa League)	1	—		56	10
Valencia	2019–20	La Liga	35	8	3	0	—		8	1	1 (Note: Appearance in Supercopa de España)	1	47	10
Valencia	Total		282	54	45	4	0	0	55	5	1	1	383	64
Villarreal	2020–21	La Liga	36	3	5	0	—		12	0	—		53	3
Villarreal	2021–22	La Liga	33	2	1	0	—		12	1	0	0	46	3
Villarreal	2022–23	La Liga	37	3	4	0	—		9 (Note: Appearances in UEFA Europa Conference League)	0	—		50	3
Villarreal	2023–24	La Liga	33	3	2	0	—		7	1	—		42	4
Villarreal	2024–25	La Liga	36	3	2	0	—		—		—		38	3
Villarreal	2025–26	La Liga	32	1	2	0	—		7	0	—		41	1
Villarreal	Total		207	15	16	0	0	0	47	2	0	0	270	17
Career total			608	91	72	5	4	0	107	8	1	1	793	105

=== International ===
Appearances and goals by national team and year
National team	Year	Apps	Goals
Spain	2018	1	0
Spain	2019	3	0
Total		4	0

== Honours ==
Valencia

- Copa del Rey: 2018–19

Villarreal

- UEFA Europa League: 2020–21

Spain U19

- UEFA European Under-19 Championship: 2007

Spain U20

- Mediterranean Games: 2009

Spain U21

- UEFA European Under-21 Championship: 2011

Individual

- UEFA La Liga Team of The Season: 2017–18, 2018–19
- UEFA Europa League Squad of the Season: 2020–21

== See also ==
- List of footballers with 400 or more La Liga appearances
