= Diego Alves =

Brazilian footballer (born 1985)

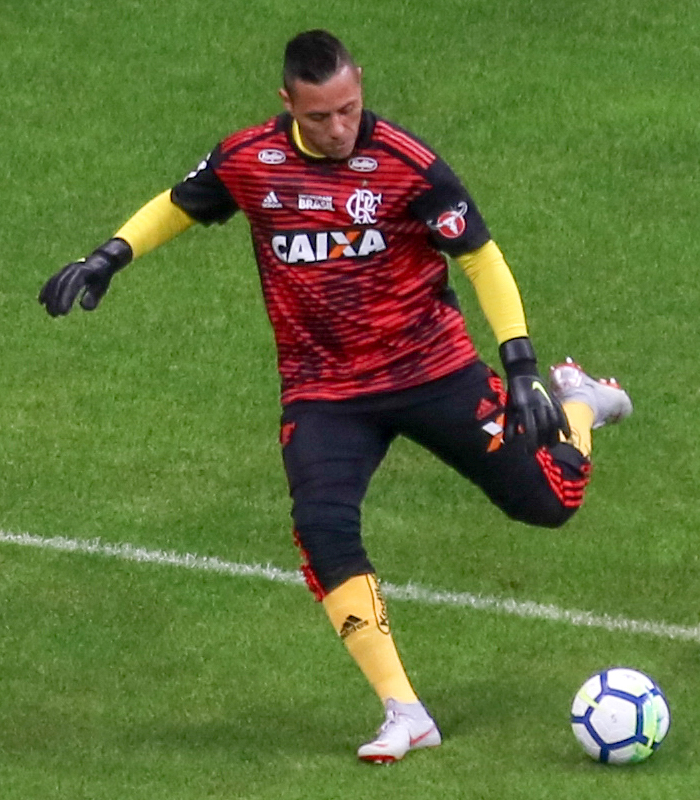
- Alves warming up with Flamengo in 2018

Personal information
- Full name: Diego Alves Carreira
- Date of birth: 24 June 1985 (age 41)
- Place of birth: Rio de Janeiro, Brazil
- Height: 1.87 m (6 ft 2 in)
- Position: Goalkeeper

Youth career
- 2001–2003: Botafogo-SP
- 2004: Atlético Mineiro

Senior career*
Years	Team	Apps	(Gls)
2004–2007	Atlético Mineiro	54	(0)
2007–2011	Almería	123	(0)
2011–2017	Valencia	146	(0)
2017–2023	Flamengo	151	(0)
2023	Celta	0	(0)
Total		474	(0)

International career^{‡}
2008	Brazil U23	2	(0)
2011–2017	Brazil	10	(0)
Medal record
Representing Brazil
Men's Football
Bronze medal – third place	2008 Beijing	Team competition
- * Club domestic league appearances and goals as of 19:58, 8 February 2023 (UTC) ‡ National team caps and goals as of 13 June 2017

Diego Alves Carreira (born 24 June 1985), is a Brazilian former professional footballer who played as a goalkeeper.

Having begun his career at Atlético Mineiro in Brazil, he spent most of it in Spain with Almería and Valencia, making 269 La Liga appearances during the decade he played in Spain, during which time he stopped a record 23 penalty kicks. In 2017 he returned to Brazil, and won several honours with Flamengo, including the Copa Libertadores in 2019.

Alves was part of the Brazilian squad which won a bronze medal at the 2008 Olympics, and made his senior international debut in 2011. He represented the latter at the Copa América Centenario.

== Club career ==
=== Atlético Mineiro / Almería ===
Alves was born in Rio de Janeiro. Having started professionally at Clube Atlético Mineiro, he moved to UD Almería on 24 July 2007, as the Andalusians had just achieved a first ever promotion to La Liga. Initially the backup to another newly signed, David Cobeño, he eventually became the undisputed starter, helping the club overachieve for a final eighth place in the league with notable performances against, among others, Real Madrid.

After Cobeño left for Rayo Vallecano in August 2008, Alves remained first-choice during 2008–09, but suffered an injury in the final stretch of the season. Fully recovered for the start of the following campaign, he played in all the matches (safe for 30 minutes against Valencia CF, after he had been sent off, and the last round against Sevilla FC as Almería were already saved from relegation); in April 2010, his agent stated a move away from the Estadio de los Juegos Mediterráneos was being considered.

On 20 November 2010, Alves was in goal as Almería lost 8–0 at home to FC Barcelona, a defeat which cost manager Juan Manuel Lillo his post. In mid-May 2011, after his team's top-flight relegation, Valencia chairman Manuel Llorente confirmed the signing of the player.

=== Valencia ===
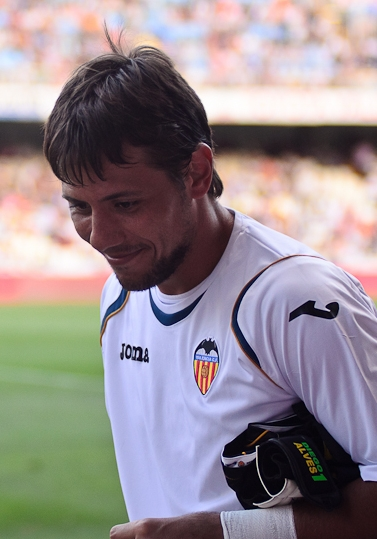
Alves as a Valencia player in 2011.

Alves made his official debut for Valencia on 13 September 2011, in a 0–0 away draw against K.R.C. Genk in the group stage of the UEFA Champions League. He backed-up Vicente Guaita in the league, however, until Guaita picked up a serious hand injury.

Alves also appeared in the second Champions League group stage match, at home to Chelsea, where he had a series of superb saves, including a string of three in two minutes – two-point-blank against Ramires and Fernando Torres, and a third when Valencia man Víctor Ruiz accidentally diverted the ensuing corner towards his own goal – in an eventual 1–1 draw.

In July 2014, Alves signed a new five-year deal to run until 2019. In the last game of the season, that also marked his 100th league appearance for the club, away against former side Almería, he tore his cruciate ligament in the 72nd minute, later undergoing surgery and being sidelined until November.

=== Flamengo ===
On 17 July 2017, ten years after leaving for Europe, Alves joined Clube de Regatas do Flamengo until 2020. On 23 November 2017, in the first leg of the semi-finals of the Copa Sudamericana against Atlético Junior at the Maracanã Stadium, he suffered a broken collar bone after being hit by Yony González; he underwent surgery two days later, being expected to return in two months. With this injury Alves was an important absentee in the 2017 Copa Sudamericana Finals.

Alves played 62 games for Flamengo in 2019, as they won the Campeonato Carioca, Campeonato Brasileiro Série A and the Copa Libertadores. In the national championship, he made the Bola da Prata for the team of the tournament.

In 2020, Alves played less than half the games. He was infected with COVID-19 at the start of the year, and also suffered a 20-game shoulder injury against Santos FC. The youngster Hugo Souza emerged in his absence. Furthermore, Alves' position in the pecking order worsened after the Flamengo board bought Santos from Athletico Paranaense in April 2022; as a result he only played in eight competitive games in 2022.

=== Celta ===
On 8 February 2023, Alves returned to Spain when he joined RC Celta de Vigo on a free transfer. He terminated his contract on 15 April, after failing to play a single minute for the club.

=== Retirement ===
On 21 January 2025, Alves announced his retirement from professional football.

== International career ==
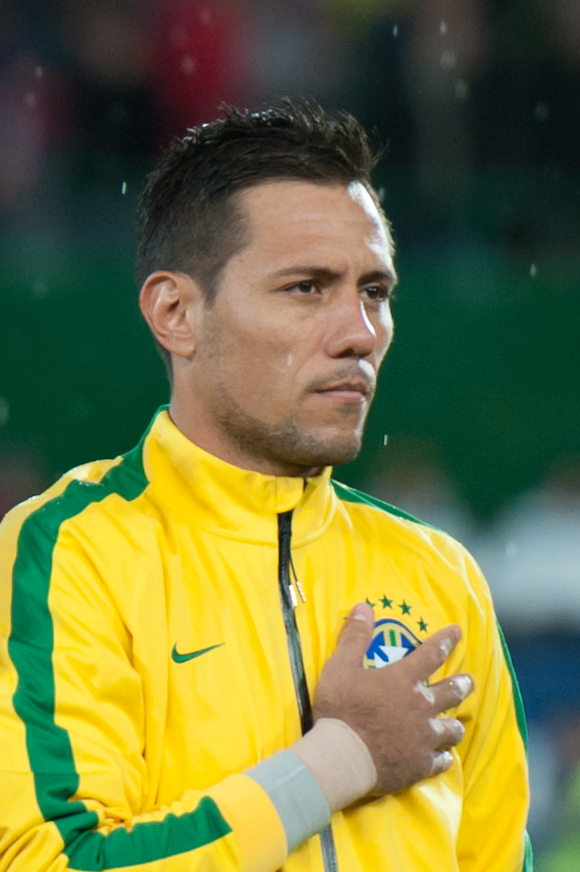
Alves lining up for Brazil in 2014.

Alves was chosen to represent Brazil at the 2008 Summer Olympics in Beijing, as backup to Renan. He did not receive any playing time during the competition, as the national team went on to win a bronze medal.

Alves made his debut for the full side on 10 November 2011, in a 2–0 friendly win with Gabon. He also played four days later, against Egypt (same score).

Alves was selected by coach Dunga for the 2015 Copa América in Chile, but withdrew due to a knee injury to be replaced by Neto. On 5 May 2016, he was named to a 23-man squad for the Copa América Centenario.

== Style of play ==
Alves made his 15th penalty save against Sevilla FC on 25 January 2015, which took his record to 42.85% of all attempts faced. Widely regarded as a specialist in the matter, he once stated that a penalty is "a psychological battle between the goalkeeper and the taker".

On 9 May 2015, after denying Real Madrid's Cristiano Ronaldo, Alves became the goalkeeper with the most penalty saves in the history of the Spanish top flight with 16 out of 37, equalling Andoni Zubizarreta who saved 16 from 102. He surpassed the latter on 25 September 2016 during a 2–1 away win over CD Leganés, following it up with two saves the next weekend – including a spectacular block from an Antoine Griezmann shot – albeit in a 0–2 home loss to Atlético Madrid; upon his departure from Valencia in 2017, he had saved 23 spot kicks.

== Career statistics ==
=== Club ===
Appearances and goals by club, season and competition
Club	Season	League			State League		Cup		Continental		Other		Total	
Club	Season	Division	Apps	Goals	Apps	Goals	Apps	Goals	Apps	Goals	Apps	Goals	Apps	Goals
Atlético Mineiro	2005	Série A	1	0	2 (Note: Appearance(s) in Campeonato Mineiro.)	0	0	0	—		—		3	0
Atlético Mineiro	2006	Série B	24	0	0	0	0	0	—		—		24	0
Atlético Mineiro	2007	Série A	13	0	14	0	7	0	—		—		34	0
Atlético Mineiro	Total		38	0	16	0	7	0	—		—		61	0
Almería	2007–08	La Liga	22	0	—		0	0	—		—		22	0
Almería	2008–09	La Liga	31	0	—		0	0	—		—		31	0
Almería	2009–10	La Liga	37	0	—		0	0	—		—		37	0
Almería	2010–11	La Liga	33	0	—		0	0	—		—		33	0
Almería	Total		123	0	—		0	0	—		—		123	0
Valencia	2011–12	La Liga	12	0	—		6	0	12 (Note: Six appearances in UEFA Champions League, six appearances in UEFA Europa League.)	0	—		30	0
Valencia	2012–13	La Liga	24	0	—		1	0	2 (Note: Appearance(s) in UEFA Champions League.)	0	—		27	0
Valencia	2013–14	La Liga	27	0	—		1	0	7 (Note: Appearance(s) in UEFA Europa League.)	0	—		35	0
Valencia	2014–15	La Liga	37	0	—		0	0	—		—		37	0
Valencia	2015–16	La Liga	13	0	—		0	0	0	0	—		13	0
Valencia	2016–17	La Liga	33	0	—		0	0	—		—		33	0
Valencia	Total		146	0	—		8	0	21	0	—		175	0
Flamengo	2017	Série A	19	0	—		—		5 (Note: Appearance(s) in Copa Sudamericana.)	0	—		24	0
Flamengo	2018	Série A	23	0	7 (Note: Appearance(s) in Campeonato Carioca.)	0	6	0	8 (Note: Appearance(s) in Copa Libertadores.)	0	—		44	0
Flamengo	2019	Série A	32	0	12	0	4	0	12	0	2 (Note: Appearance(s) in FIFA Club World Cup.)	0	62	0
Flamengo	2020	Série A	10	0	10	0	2	0	4	0	3 (Note: Two appearances in Recopa Sudamericana, one appearance in Supercopa do Brasil.)	0	29	0
Flamengo	2021	Série A	26	0	5	0	6	0	11	0	1 (Note: Appearance(s) in Supercopa do Brasil.)	0	49	0
Flamengo	2022	Série A	5	0	2	0	1	0	0	0	0	0	8	0
Flamengo	Total		115	0	36	0	19	0	40	0	6	0	216	0
Celta	2022–23	La Liga	0	0	—		—		—		—		0	0
Career totals			422	0	52	0	34	0	61	0	6	0	575	0

=== International ===
Appearances and goals by national team and year
National team	Year	Apps	Goals
Brazil	2011	2	0
Brazil	2012	5	0
Brazil	2013	0	0
Brazil	2014	2	0
Brazil	2015	0	0
Brazil	2016	0	0
Brazil	2017	1	0
Career total		10	0

== Honours ==
Atlético Mineiro

- Campeonato Brasileiro Série B: 2006
- Campeonato Mineiro: 2007

Flamengo

- Campeonato Brasileiro Série A: 2019, 2020
- Copa do Brasil: 2022
- Supercopa do Brasil: 2020, 2021
- Copa Libertadores: 2019, 2022
- Recopa Sudamericana: 2020
- Campeonato Carioca: 2019, 2020, 2021

Brazil

- Summer Olympic Games: Bronze medal 2008

Individual

- Bola de Prata: 2019
