= Míchel (footballer, born 1988) =

Spanish footballer

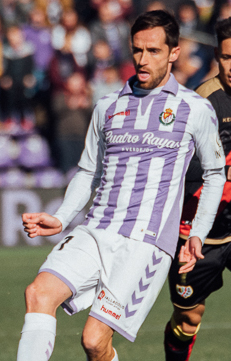
- Míchel with Valladolid in 2019

Personal information
- Full name: Miguel Alfonso Herrero Javaloyas
- Date of birth: 29 July 1988 (age 38)
- Place of birth: Burjassot, Spain
- Height: 1.81 m (5 ft 11 in)
- Position: Attacking midfielder

Youth career
- Burjassot

Senior career*
Years	Team	Apps	(Gls)
2006–2007	Burjassot	38	(7)
2007–2010	Valencia B	75	(27)
2009–2012	Valencia	16	(0)
2010–2011	→ Deportivo La Coruña (loan)	8	(0)
2011–2012	→ Hércules (loan)	38	(13)
2012–2013	Levante	37	(5)
2013–2014	Valencia	13	(0)
2014	→ Getafe (loan)	12	(1)
2015–2016	Guangzhou R&F	25	(4)
2016	→ Oviedo (loan)	18	(0)
2016–2021	Valladolid	157	(12)
2021–2022	Tenerife	33	(3)
2022–2024	Hércules	35	(6)
2024	Torrent	10	(0)
2024–2025	Alzira	32	(3)

International career
2009	Spain U21	4	(1)
- * Club domestic league appearances and goals as of 17:05, 28 October 2025 (UTC)

Miguel Alfonso Herrero Javaloyas (Spanish pronunciation: [miˈɣel alˈfonso eˈreɾo xaβaˈloʝas]; born 29 July 1988), commonly known as Míchel [ˈmitʃel], is a Spanish professional footballer who plays mainly as an attacking midfielder.

He achieved La Liga totals of 172 games and nine goals over nine seasons, with Valencia, Deportivo, Levante, Getafe and Valladolid.

== Club career ==
=== Valencia ===
Born in Burjassot, Valencian Community, Míchel finished his football grooming at local Burjassot CF and started playing as a senior with Valencia CF's reserves. After a string of midfield injuries to the main squad (Rubén Baraja, Edu and Manuel Fernandes) he was called up by coach Unai Emery, making his La Liga debut against FC Barcelona, playing 20 minutes in a 4–0 away loss on 6 December 2008; previous to that, he had already appeared in a Copa del Rey game against Club Portugalete, where he also scored.

Míchel's first start occurred on 3 March 2009 in the 2–1 loss at CD Numancia, as he began to be regularly summoned to the league's squad of 18 each week. He was delighted with his first year at Valencia, never having imagined he would be playing for the club's first team after being not much earlier in the Tercera División.

=== Loans and Levante ===
In early June 2010, deemed surplus to requirements by coach Emery – for instance, in the 2009–10 campaign he only collected 28 minutes in the league, all as a late substitute – Míchel was loaned for one season to Deportivo de La Coruña. He spent most of the campaign injured, and the Galicians were also relegated after 20 years in the top flight.

At Hércules CF, where he spent the 2011–12 season, Míchel scored a career-best 13 goals, also being a key player as the team nearly returned to the top tier. The club attempted to acquire the player permanently, but were eventually denied.

Míchel rescinded his contract with Valencia in June 2012, and signed a three-year deal with neighbouring Levante UD shortly after. He scored eight goals in 51 official games in his only season, including two in 11 in that campaign's UEFA Europa League.

=== Return to Valencia ===
On 10 May 2013, Míchel agreed on a return to former club Valencia, penning a three-year link after his €420,000 buyout clause was paid. He made his debut in his second spell on 17 August, playing the full 90 minutes in a 1–0 home win against Málaga CF.

Míchel was loaned to Getafe CF of the same league in late July 2014, for two years.

=== Guangzhou R&F ===
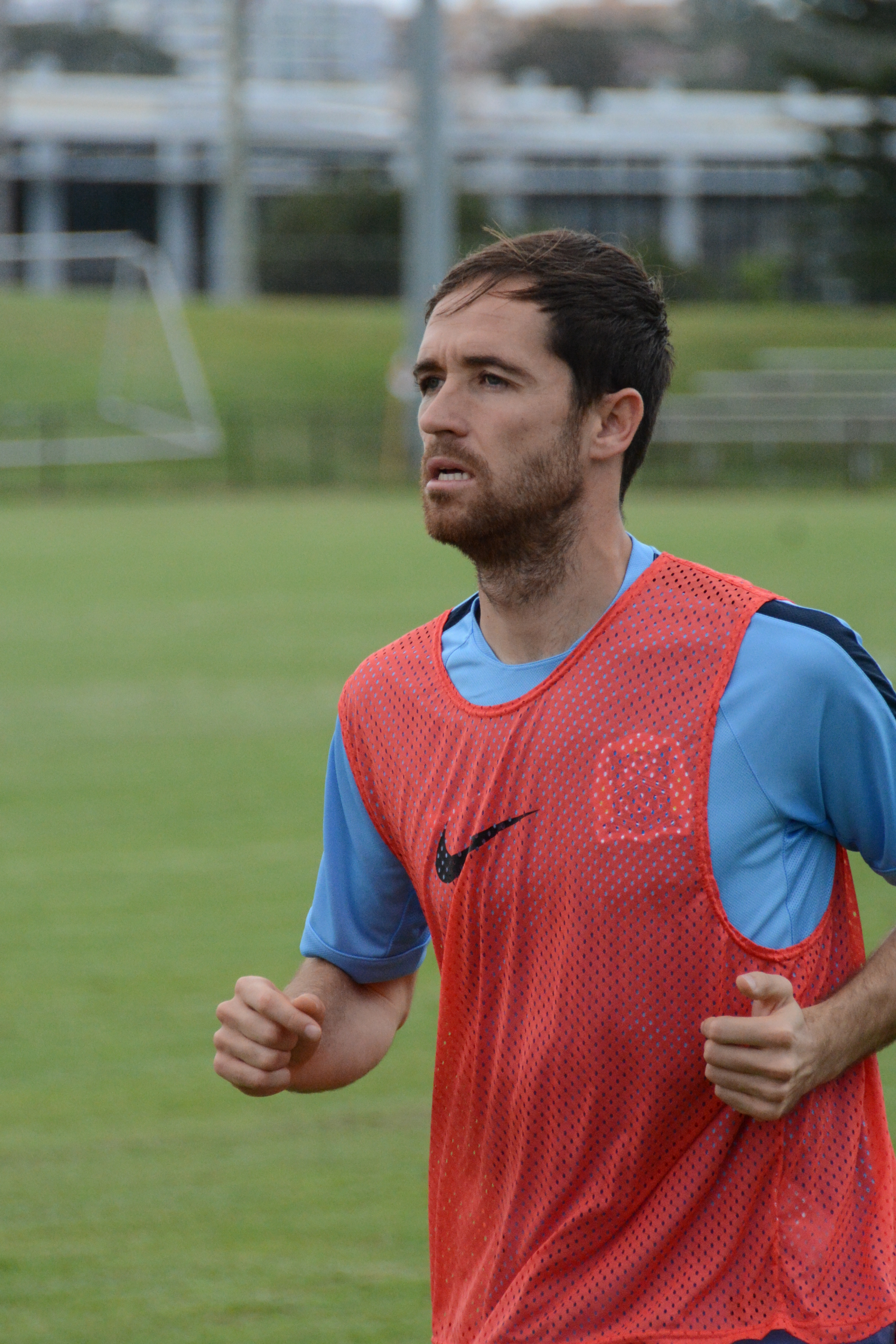
Míchel training with Guangzhou R&F in 2015

On 18 December 2014, Míchel was sold to Guangzhou R&F F.C. in the Chinese Super League. He made his debut for his new team on 10 February of the following year, appearing in the second preliminary round of the AFC Champions League against Warriors FC.

Míchel returned to Spain on loan in January 2016, to Real Oviedo of the Segunda División.

=== Valladolid ===
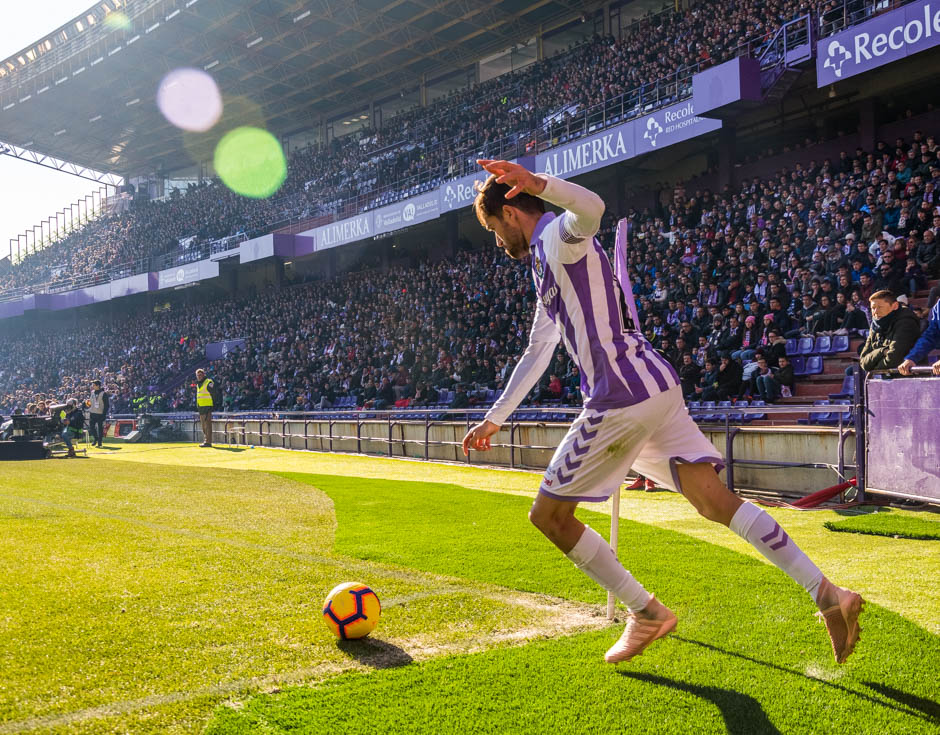
Míchel taking a corner for Valladolid in 2019

In August 2016, Míchel negotiated an end to his contract in China and signed a three-year deal with Real Valladolid. Having consolidated their place in the top division, he extended by a further year at its conclusion.

Míchel's link with was automatically renewed due to an appearances clause in the summer of 2020, amidst interest from Göztepe S.K. of Turkey. However he stayed put, and became the new captain in October after Javi Moyano left.

Míchel left the Estadio José Zorrilla on 30 June 2021, as his contract expired.

=== Tenerife ===
On 18 July 2021, free agent Míchel joined second-division CD Tenerife on a two-year deal. On 23 August 2022, he terminated his contract.

== Personal life ==
In 2019, Míchel married BeIN Sports reporter Celia Sanchís.

== Career statistics ==
As of 5 May 2024

Appearances and goals by club, season and competition
Club	Season	League			Cup (Note: Appearances in Copa del Rey)		Continental		Other		Total	
Club	Season	Division	Apps	Goals	Apps	Goals	Apps	Goals	Apps	Goals	Apps	Goals
Valencia	2008–09	La Liga	13	0	3	1	—		—		16	1
Valencia	2009–10	La Liga	3	0	2	0	5 (Note: Appearances in UEFA Europa League)	0	—		10	0
Valencia	Total		16	0	5	1	5	0	—		26	1
Deportivo (loan)	2010–11	La Liga	10	0	0	0	—		—		10	0
Hércules (loan)	2011–12	Segunda División	38	13	1	1	—		2 (Note: Appearances in La Liga play-offs)	0	41	14
Levante	2012–13	La Liga	37	5	3	1	11	2	—		51	8
Valencia	2013–14	La Liga	13	0	2	0	6	0	—		21	0
Guangzhou R&F	2015	Chinese Super League	25	4	2	0	8 (Note: Appearances in AFC Champions League)	0	—		35	4
Oviedo (loan)	2015–16	Segunda División	18	0	—		—		—		18	0
Valladolid	2016–17	Segunda División	42	3	3	1	—		—		45	4
Valladolid	2017–18	Segunda División	29	5	1	0	—		1	0	31	5
Valladolid	2018–19	La Liga	35	1	0	0	—		—		35	1
Valladolid	2019–20	La Liga	29	1	1	0	—		—		30	1
Valladolid	2020–21	La Liga	22	2	3	1	—		—		25	3
Valladolid	Total		157	12	8	2	—		1	0	166	14
Tenerife	2021–22	Segunda División	33	3	2	1	—		1	0	36	4
Hércules	2022–23	Segunda Federación	32	6	1	0	—		—		33	6
Hércules	2023–24	Segunda Federación	3	0	1	0	—		—		4	0
Hércules	Total		35	6	2	0	—		—		37	6
Torrent	2023–24	Segunda Federación	10	0	—		—		—		10	0
Career total			392	43	25	6	30	2	4	0	451	51
