= Amadeo Salvo =

Spanish football executive (born 1967)

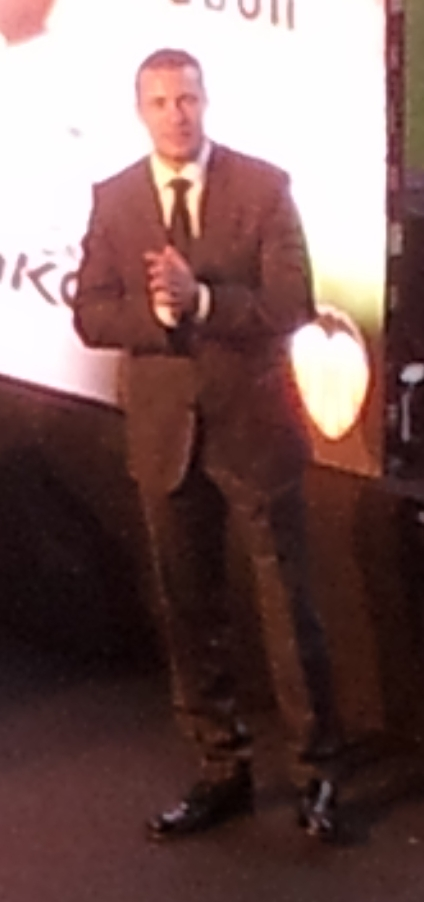
Amadeo Salvo

Amadeo Salvo Lillo (born 31 March 1967) is a Spanish businessman and football executive. He was the president of Valencia CF from 2013 to 2015, and founded UD Ibiza in 2015.

== Biography ==
Born in Valencia, Salvo was the founder of Power Electronics, serving as director general from 1990 to 2011 and then as executive vice president.

Salvo was elected president of his hometown's La Liga club Valencia CF in June 2013, while the club was experiencing financial difficulties. He received over 90% of the vote. In May 2014, he supported the takeover of the club by Singapore billionaire Peter Lim. In December, Lim moved Salvo to executive president, while the presidency of the board went to his associate Lay Hoon Chan. Salvo resigned in July 2015, shortly after sporting director Francisco Rufete and several other backroom staff, and Chan took his place. Salvo dismissed allegations that he had a feud with manager Nuno Espírito Santo and Portuguese sports agent Jorge Mendes, a close friend of Lim and alleged influence in the running of the club.

Days after leaving Valencia CF, Salvo founded UD Ibiza, a revival of the UD Ibiza-Eivissa club that folded in 2010. He was able to use the defunct club's identity by settling its debts of over €50,000 with the Balearic Islands and national football federations. Prohibited from promotion out of the regional divisions for two years as a new team, the club reached the Tercera División in 2017 and the Segunda División B a year later, before reaching the Segunda División in May 2021 with a playoff win over UCAM Murcia CF. Weeks before the promotion, the club was converted into a Sociedad Anónima Deportiva (SAD), a form of public limited company obligatory for clubs in the top two divisions of Spanish football; the initial capital was €700,000.
