= Orange Trophy =

Orange Trophy (Trofeo Naranja)
- Organiser(s): Valencia CF
- Founded: 1959; 67 years ago
- Region: Valencia, Spain
- Teams: 2
- Related competitions: Joan Gamper Trophy
- Current champions: Newcastle United (1st title)
- Most championships: Valencia (33 titles)

The Orange Trophy (Valencian: Trofeu Taronja, Spanish: Trofeo Naranja) is an annual friendly football tournament hosted by Valencia CF and first played in 1959.

== Wins by team ==
Team	Winners	Runners-up	Years won	Years runner-up
(Spain) Valencia	33	21	1961, 1962, 1970, 1975, 1978, 1979, 1980, 1983, 1984, 1988, 1989, 1991, 1993, 1994, 1996, 1998, 1999, 2001, 2002, 2006, 2008, 2009, 2010, 2011, 2012, 2013, 2014, 2016, 2018, 2021, 2022, 2024, 2025	1972, 1973, 1974, 1977, 1981, 1982, 1985, 1986, 1990, 1992, 1995, 1997, 2000, 2003, 2005, 2007, 2015, 2017, 2019, 2023, 2026
(Brazil) Flamengo	2	–	1964, 1986	–
(Spain) Real Madrid	2	–	1990, 2003	–
(Italy) Parma	2	–	2000, 2007	–
(Brazil) Santos	1	2	1959	–
(Italy) Roma	1	2	2015	2006, 2011
(Italy) Atalanta	1	1	2017	2022
(Spain) Barcelona	1	1	1987	1994
(Russia) Dynamo Moscow	1	1	1992	1976
(Germany) Bayern Munich	1	–	1972	–
(Serbia) Red Star Belgrade	1	–	1973	–
(Netherlands) PSV Eindhoven	1	–	1974	–
(Russia) CSKA Moscow	1	–	1976	–
(Germany) Borussia Mönchengladbach	1	–	1977	–
Hungary	1	–	1981	–
(Germany) 1. FC Kaiserslautern	1	–	1982	–
(Argentina) Boca Juniors	1	–	1985	–
(Spain) Atlético Madrid	1	–	1995	–
(Brazil) Palmeiras	1	–	1997	–
(Italy) Udinese	1	–	2005	–
(Italy) Inter Milan	1	–	2019	–
(England) Aston Villa	1	–	2023	–
(England) Newcastle United	1	–	2026	–
(Italy) Fiorentina	–	3	–	1987, 2010, 2016
(Uruguay) Peñarol	–	2	–	1983, 2001
(Uruguay) Nacional	–	2	–	1989, 2002
(Portugal) Porto	–	2	-	1988, 2012
(Italy) Milan	–	2	–	2014, 2021
(Argentina) Independiente	–	1	–	1970
(Switzerland) Zürich	–	1	–	1975
(Argentina) Huracán	–	1	–	1978
(Spain) Espanyol	–	1	–	1979
(Brazil) Vasco da Gama	–	1	–	1980
(Argentina) River Plate	–	1	–	1984
(Brazil) São Paulo	–	1	–	1991
(Netherlands) Feyenoord	–	1	–	1993
(Italy) Perugia	–	1	–	1996
(Romania) Dinamo București	–	1	–	1998
Austria Salzburg	–	1	–	1999
(Netherlands) Vitesse	–	1	–	2008
(England) Arsenal	–	1	–	2009
(Greece) Olympiacos	–	1	–	2013
(Germany) Bayer Leverkusen	–	1	–	2018
(Germany) Eintracht Frankfurt	–	1	–	2024
(Italy) Torino	–	1	–	2025

== Performance by nation ==
Nation	Wins
Spain	37
Italy	6
Brazil	4
Germany	3
Russia	2
Argentina	1
England	2
Hungary	1
Netherlands	1
Serbia	1
