= Sergio García (disambiguation) =

Sergio García (Sergio García Fernández) (born 1980) is a Spanish golfer.

Sergio García may also refer to:

== Law and politics ==
- Sergio García Ramírez (1938–2024), Mexican jurist and politician
- Sergio García de Alba (born 1955), Mexican businessman and politician
- Sergio García Sepúlveda (born 1963), Mexican politician
- Sergio C. Garcia (born 1977), Mexican attorney in California

== Sports ==
=== Association football (soccer) ===
- Sergio García (footballer, born 1982), Mexican footballer
- Sergio García (footballer, born 1983), Spanish footballer
- Sergio García (footballer, born 1989) (born 1989), Spanish footballer
- Sergio García (footballer, born 1996), Spanish footballer

=== Other sports ===
- Sergio García (judoka) (born 1987), Mexican judoka
- Sergio García (swimmer) (born 1989), Spanish swimmer
- Sergio García (skater) (born 1990), Spanish vert skater
- Sergio García (boxer) (born 1992), Spanish boxer
- Sergio García (motorcyclist) (born 2003), Spanish motorcycle rider

== Others ==
- 2Slimey (born 2006) Mexican-American rapper whose birth name is Sergio Garcia
- Sergio García Michel (1945–2010), Mexican film director
- Sergio Garcia (actor) (born 1990), Filipino actor

== See also ==
- Sergi Garcia (disambiguation)
