= Daniel Pendín =

Argentine footballer

Dani Pendín
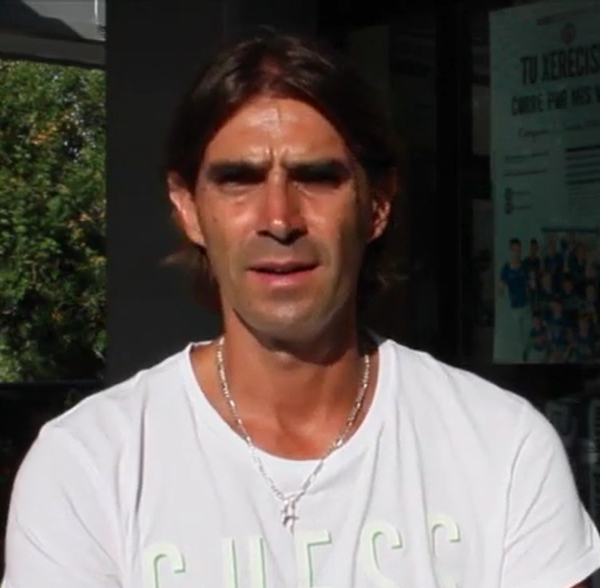
- Pendín in 2017

Personal information
- Full name: Daniel Alberto Pendín Sánchez
- Date of birth: 29 October 1974 (age 52)
- Place of birth: Rosario, Argentina
- Height: 1.86 m (6 ft 1 in)
- Position: Midfielder

Team information
- Current team: (assistant)

Youth career
- 1990–1995: Newell's Old Boys

Senior career*
| Years | Team | Apps | (Gls) |
| 1995–1997 | Newell's Old Boys | 0 | (0) |
| 1995–1996 | → Huracán Buceo (loan) | | |
| 1996–1997 | → Central Córdoba (loan) | 14 | (7) |
| 1997–1999 | Oviedo B | 53 | (3) |
| 1999–2002 | Burgos | 98 | (15) |
| 2002–2006 | Xerez | 126 | (22) |
| 2006–2010 | Castellón | 86 | (6) |
| 2010–2011 | Pontevedra | 31 | (8) |
| 2011 | San Fernando | | |
| 2013–2015 | Xerez Deportivo | | |
| Total | | 408 | (61) |

Managerial career
- 2015–2016: Xerez Deportivo
- 2017–2020: Mallorca (assistant)
- 2020–2022: Espanyol (assistant)
- 2022–2023: Al Shabab (assistant)
- 2023: Almería (assistant)
- * Club domestic league appearances and goals

Daniel Alberto 'Dani' Pendín Sánchez (born 29 October 1974) is an Argentine retired footballer who played as a central midfielder.

He spent most of his 16-year career in Spain, appearing in 245 Segunda División games over the course of nine seasons (35 goals) while playing mainly for Xerez and Castellón.

== Playing career ==
Pendín was born in Rosario, Santa Fe. A product of Newell's Old Boys' youth ranks he could never impose himself in its first team, also being loaned two times, including once in Uruguay with Huracán Buceo. Aged 23, he was released and moved to Spain with Real Oviedo Vetusta – Real Oviedo's reserves – never appearing officially for the main squad.

In the Segunda División B, Pendín played with Burgos CF, promoting in 2001 but being relegated the following year due to financial irregularities. He continued to be a regular the following seasons in Segunda División, with Andalusia's Xerez.

Aged already 32, Pendín moved to Castellón also in division two, making 95 competitive appearances for the Valencian side. After the club's relegation at the end of the 2009–10 campaign, the veteran continued in the country, signing with third-tier Pontevedra.

Pendín returned to football on 12 August 2013 after two years of inactivity, with the 38-year-old joining Xerez Deportivo in the regional leagues.

== Coaching career ==
Pendín started working as a manager with his last club, still in amateur football. He later was part of former Xerez teammate Vicente Moreno's staffs at RCD Mallorca and RCD Espanyol.
