= Marcelo Villaça =

Spanish footballer (born 1994)

Personal information
- Full name: Marcelo Villaça Casares
- Date of birth: 14 December 1994 (age 31)
- Place of birth: Jerez de la Frontera, Spain
- Height: 1.73 m (5 ft 8 in)
- Position: Left back

Team information
- Current team: Xerez Deportivo
- Number: 2

Youth career
- Xerez

Senior career*
Years	Team	Apps	(Gls)
2011–2013	Xerez	51	(2)
2013–2014	Levante B	15	(0)
2014–2016	Pobla Mafumet	50	(0)
2016–2018	Sanluqueño	54	(1)
2018–	Xerez Deportivo	192	(4)
- * Club domestic league appearances and goals as of 16 May 2026

Marcelo Villaça Casares (born 14 December 1994) is a Spanish footballer who plays for Segunda Federación club Xerez Deportivo mainly as a left back.

== Club career ==
Born in Jerez de la Frontera, Cádiz, Andalusia, Marcelo graduated from Xerez CD's youth system, and made his senior debut with the reserves in the 2012–13 campaign in the Tercera División. On 30 March 2013 he played his first match as a professional, coming on as a second half substitute in a 0–4 away defeat against CD Lugo in the Segunda División.

Marcelo appeared in three further matches for the Andalusians, which were relegated after finishing dead last. On 16 August 2013 he moved to Levante UD, being assigned to the B-team in the Segunda División B.

On 12 January 2015 Marcelo rescinded his link with the Granotes, and signed for CF Pobla de Mafumet a day after. On 17 July 2016 he moved to third-tier club Atlético Sanluqueño CF.
