= Estadio Municipal de Chapín =

Football stadium in Jerez, Spain

Chapín
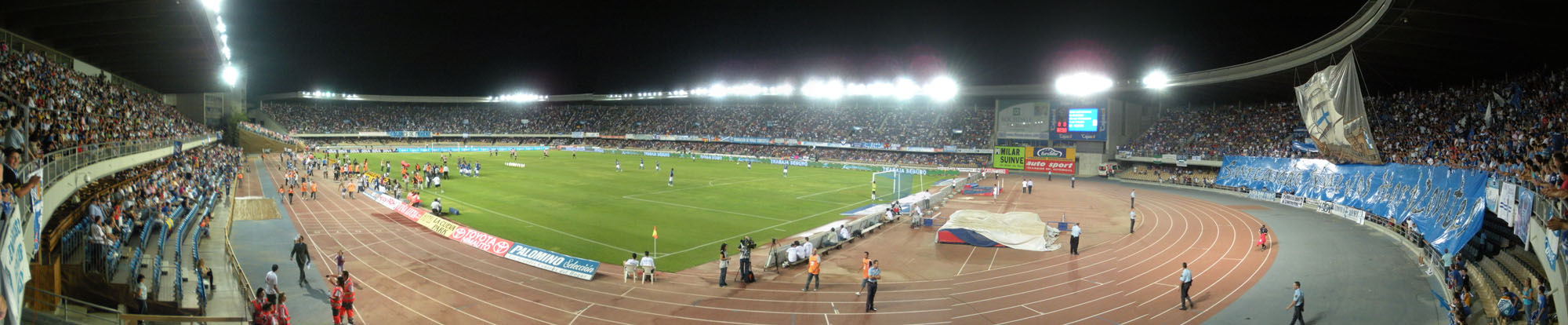
- Interactive map of Chapín
- Location: Jerez de la Frontera, Spain
- Coordinates: 36°41′21″N 6°07′13″W
- Owner: Ayuntamiento de Jerez
- Operator: Ayuntamiento de Jerez
- Capacity: 20,523
- Field size: 102 metres (112 yd) x 62 metres (68 yd)

Construction
- Opened: 1988

Tenants
- Xerez Deportivo FC; Spain national football team (selected matches)

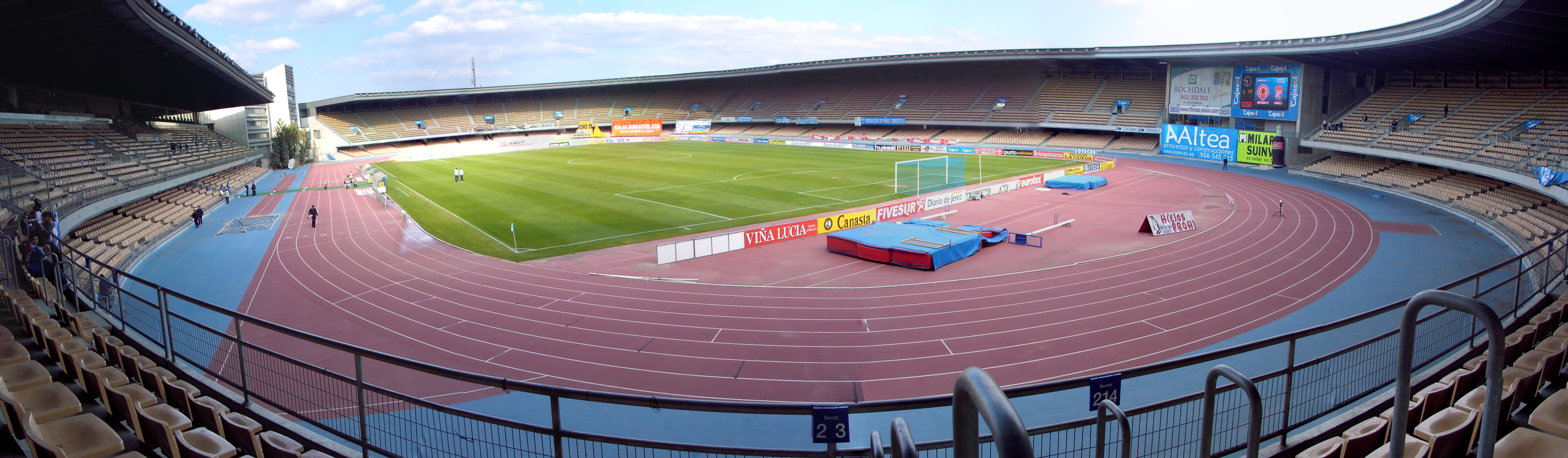
Panoramic view of the stadium in 2008

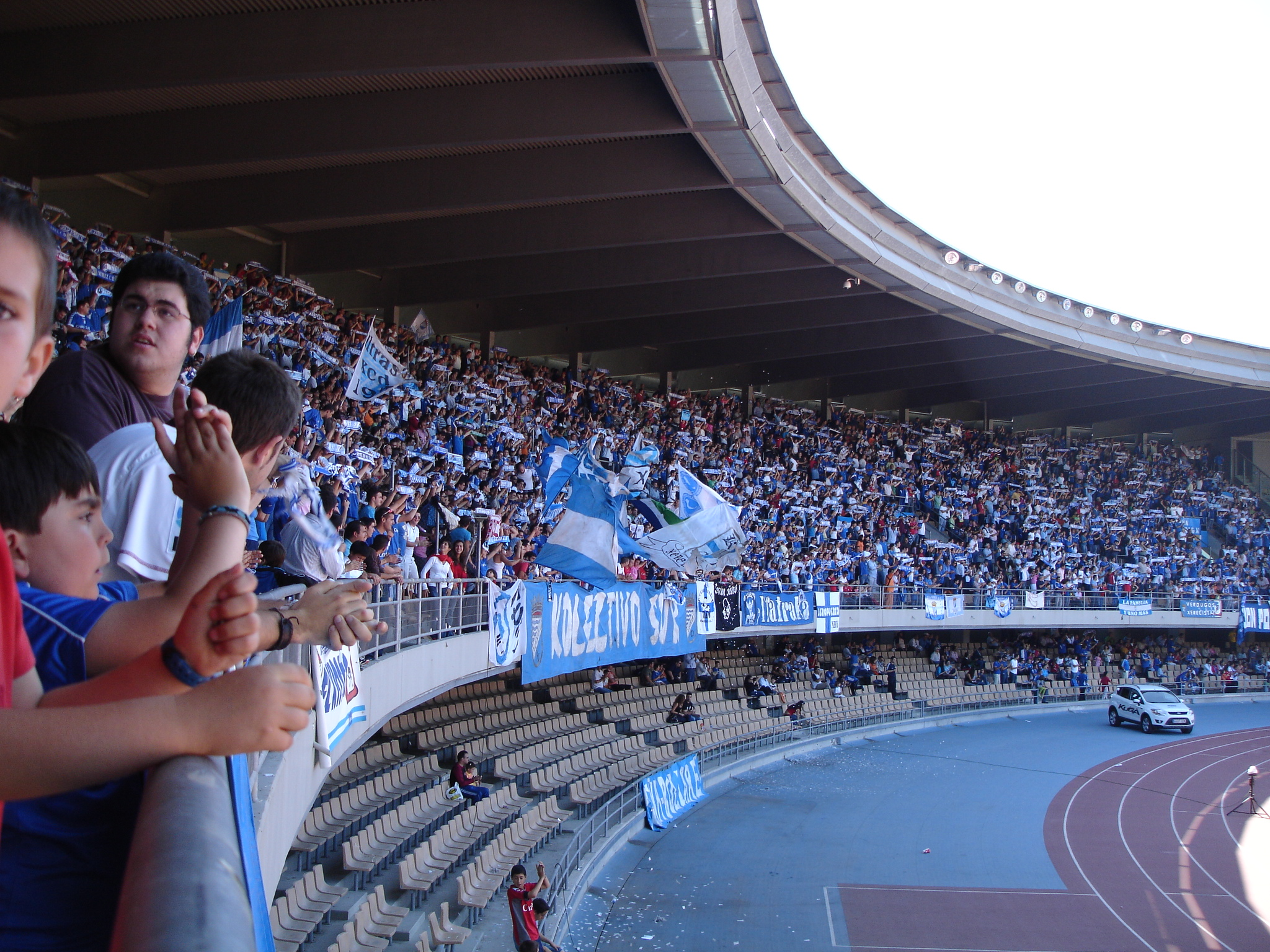
Estadio municipal de Chapín

Estadio Municipal de Chapín is a multi-purpose stadium in Jerez, Spain. It is currently used mostly for football matches and is the home ground of Xerez Deportivo FC. Xerez Deportivo are the current tenants and Xerez CD former tenants. The stadium holds 20,523 and it was opened on 28 June 1988.

== Remodeling ==
In 2002, the stadium was remodeled to hold the 2002 FEI World Equestrian Games. The whole grandstand was covered with roof, and a hotel and spa-gym was added.
