= Carlos Orúe =

Spanish football manager

Personal information
- Full name: Carlos Francisco Orúe Vázquez
- Date of birth: 9 March 1952 (age 74)
- Place of birth: Jerez, Spain

Managerial career
- Years: Team
- 1996–1998: Xerez
- 1999: Cacereño
- 2000: Coria
- 2000–2001: Cádiz
- 2001–2002: Ceuta
- 2003: Ciudad Murcia
- 2003: Xerez
- 2004–2005: Rayo Vallecano
- 2006–2007: Ceuta
- 2007–2008: Portuense
- 2009–2010: Ceuta
- 2011–2012: Leganés
- 2013–2015: Xerez Deportivo

Carlos Fernando Orúe Vázquez (born 9 March 1952) is a Spanish football manager.

== Coaching career ==
Born in Jerez de la Frontera, Province of Cádiz, Andalusia, Orúe started coaching with hometown club Xerez CD in 1996, in Segunda División B. He achieved promotion to Segunda División in his first season, but was sacked on 27 January 1998 after a poor run of results.

After spells at third level sides CP Cacereño and Coria CF, Orúe was appointed Cádiz CF manager in 2000. He left the following year, and joined AD Ceuta shortly after.

In 2003 Orúe was named manager of Ciudad de Murcia, and led the team to their first promotion ever to the second division. In July of that year he returned to Xerez, but was dismissed in November.

On 14 July 2004, Orúe was appointed at the helm of Rayo Vallecano, freshly relegated from division two. After failing to achieve promotion, he left the club.

On 14 March 2006, Orúe replaced sacked Ramón Calderé at Ceuta. After a subsequent spell at Racing Club Portuense, he returned to the former in 2009.

On 17 November 2011, Orúe was appointed manager at CD Leganés, and was sacked the following February. On 3 August 2013, he took over as manager of Xerez Deportivo FC of the regional leagues.

In May 2015, despite achieving two consecutive promotions, Orúe resigned after an altercation with the club's board.
