= Sergi García =

Sergi García can refer to:

- Sergi García (basketball) (born 1997), Spanish basketball player
- Sergi García (footballer) (born 1999), Spanish footballer

== See also ==
- Sergio García (disambiguation)
