= Xerez Deportivo FC =

Association football club in Spain

Xerez Deportivo
- Full name: Xerez Deportivo Fútbol Club
- Nicknames: Xerecistas, Azulinos, El Xerez nuevo
- Founded: 28 June 2013; 13 years ago
- Ground: Chapín; Jerez de la Frontera, Spain
- Capacity: 20,742
- Owner: 4,500 partners
- President: Jesús Viloita
- Coach: Diego Caro
- League: Tercera Federación – Group 10
- 2025–26: Segunda Federación – Group 4, 15th of 18 (relegated)
- Website: xerezdfc.com
Home colours	Away colours	Third colours

Xerez Deportivo Fútbol Club, also known as Xerez DFC, is a football club in Jerez de la Frontera. It was founded in 2013 by a group of fans due to the critical situation of Xerez CD. It plays in the Tercera Federación – Group 10, holding home matches at the Estadio Municipal de Chapín, with an overall 20,742-seat capacity. The team colours are usually blue shirts and socks, with white shorts.

== History ==
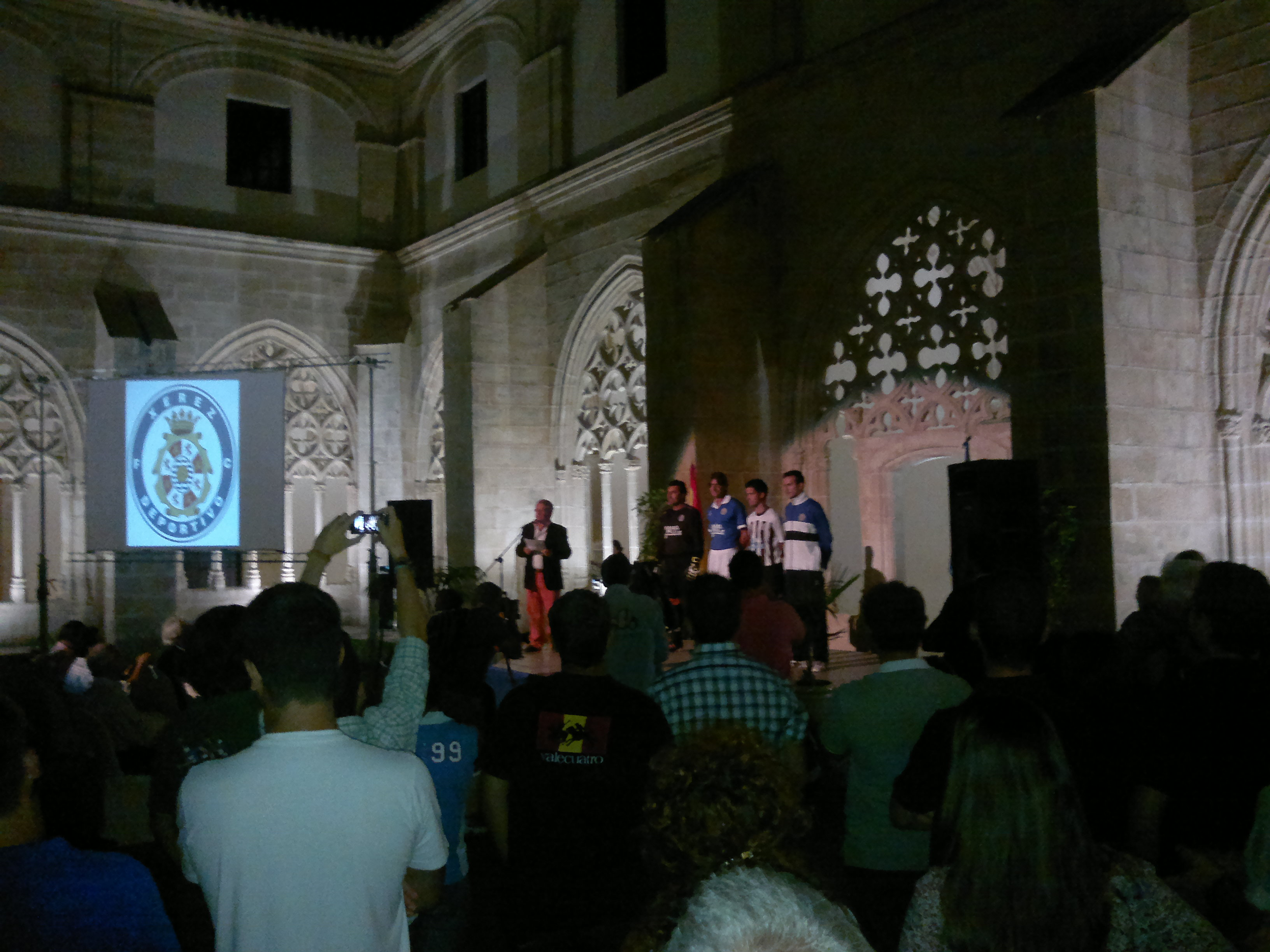
Xerez kit presentation in Jerez (2013–14 season)

In June 2013, Joaquín Morales, chairman of Xerez CD, announced he was going to liquidate the club for economic reasons (the club had been in debt for years). A group of fans met and decided to form a new club to replace the old one, and on 28 June the new club, Xerez Deportivo FC, was inaugurated. Morales consequently decided to sell Xerez CD to Ricardo García, a businessman who had considered liquidating another city club, Jerez Industrial CF.

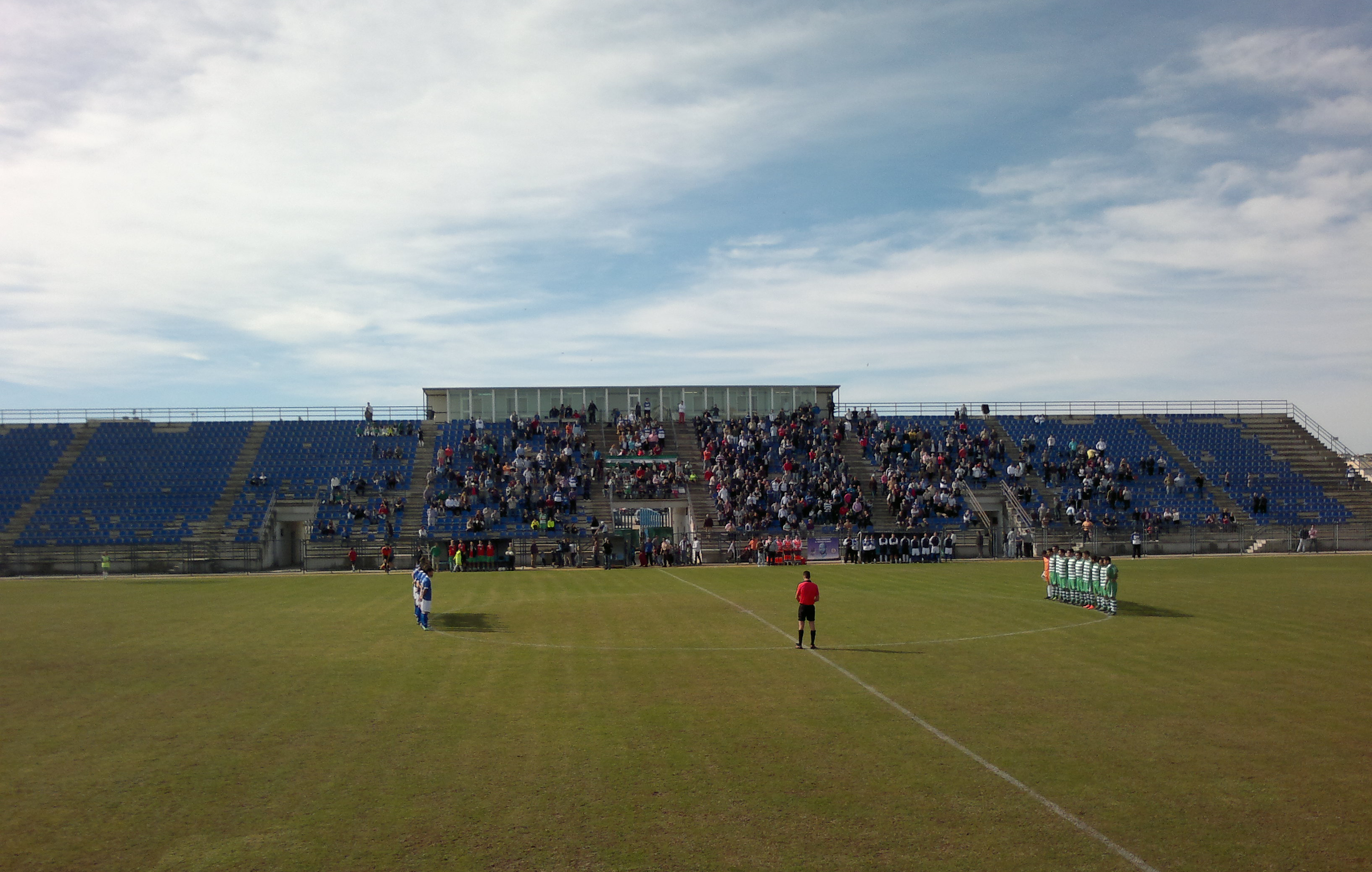
Federico Mayo CF B – Xerez Deportivo FC in Estadio de La Juventud (2013)

On 17 July 2013, the Salvemos al Xerez (Save Xerez) group held a special session, the Asamblea Xerecista (Assembly of Xerecistas), with club supporters voting to decide the question: "Está usted de acuerdo en que el Xerez Deportivo FC comience a competir en la temporada 2013/14?" (Do you agree that Xerez Deportivo FC should play in the 2013–14 season?) The vote resulted in a 75.79% majority voting 'yes' (for: 689; against: 201; abstentions: 10), and the new club started to play in the eighth national league.

Sixto de la Calle led the team as an interim president during its inaugural season. 5,865 subscribers were retrieved, setting a record for a non-professional club. On 30 December 2013, José Ravelo was elected its new president. On 6 April 2014, Deportivo FC was promoted to the seventh national league and won 3–1 against CD Guadiaro.

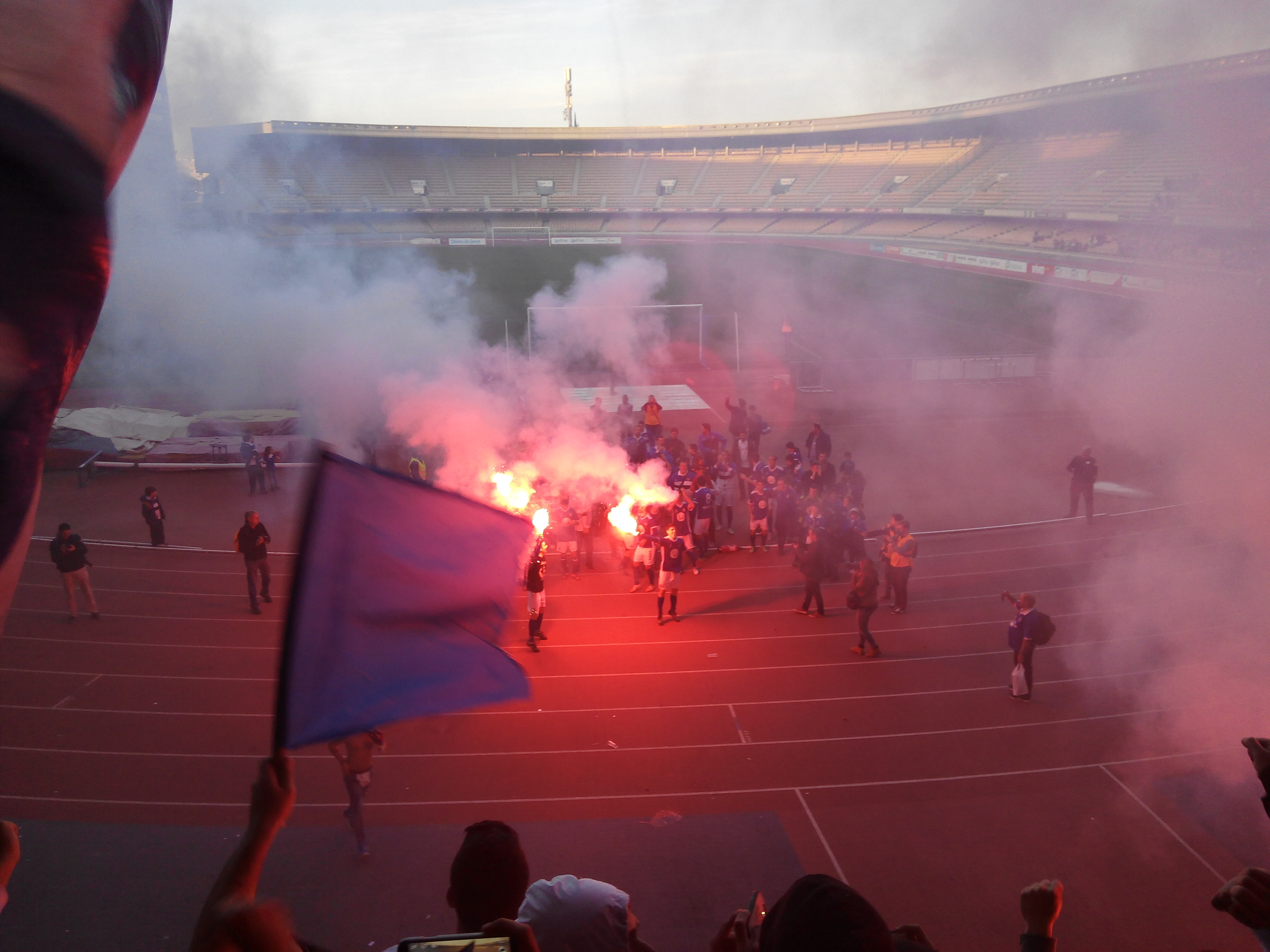
Xerez DFC promotion to the 2nd Division Andaluza

In the summer of 2014, the assembly voted to create a futsal and a track team, and the club came to terms with the SD Jerez 93 futsal team and the Club Atletismo Chapín track team to include both as part of Xerez Deportivo FC.

The following season, the club acquired 4,102 subscribers and was able to attract players from higher categories. In early 2015, the board of directors decided to democratize the club and allow all members to attend assemblies and elect the president. On 22 February 2015, Xerez Deportivo FC was promoted to the sixth national league and won 6–0 against Espera CF. On 25 May 2015, Carlos Orúe resigned as coach due to disagreements with Pedro Ruiz (responsible for sports affairs) and some of the players. He was replaced by Daniel Pendín.

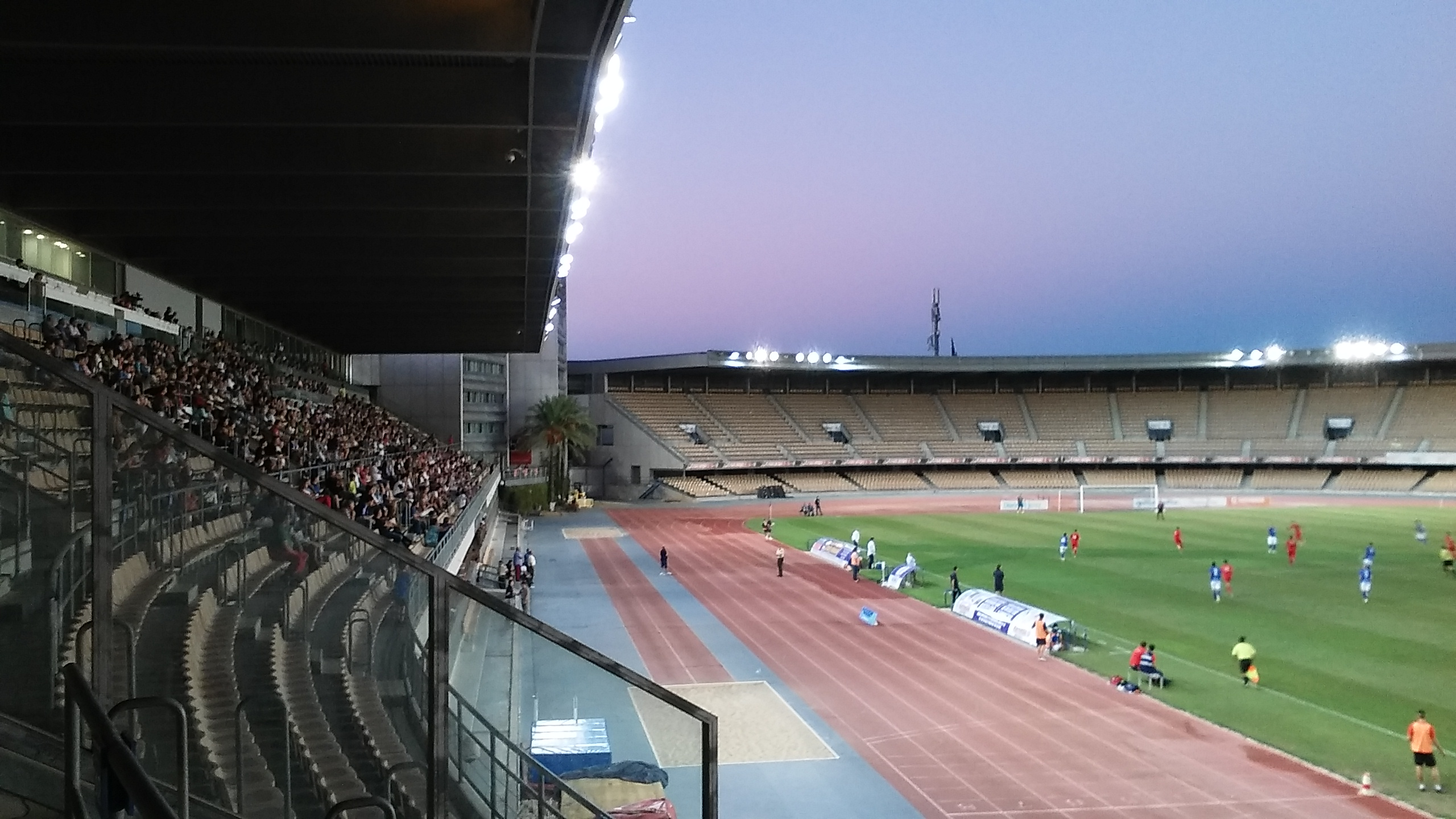
Match in Chapín

It was revealed on 7 July 2015 that talks to merge Xerez CD and Xerez Deportivo FC into a single club were underway. The board of directors decided to convene an assembly on 23 July to make a decision. On 23 July, the Assembly met in Alcazar of Jerez de la Frontera, where over 350 partners of Xerez Deportivo FC decided for the "Unification of xerecismo" (for: 317; against: 39; abstentions: 7). But finally the "Unification of Xerecismo" was not carried out, because Xerez CD fans voted "no" (for: 0; against: 56; abstentions: 11).

On 17 August, the assembly decided to create a rugby team. Xerez Deportivo FC and Club Rugby Xerez, a rugby team founded in 1992, came to a collaboration agreement, so Club Rugby Xerez became a sports club. Early in September, most of Xerez DFC fans showed their discomfort with their board of directors and the Ayuntamiento de Jerez due to use of the Estadio Municipal de Chapín.

The team kept producing strong results as the new season got underway. Easter Sunday, 2016, saw Xerez Deportivo FC advance to the fifth national league after defeating Puerto Real CF 2–0. On 25 May, the Asamblea de Socios approved reaching an agreement with Estella CD to be the reserve team of Xerez DFC. In summer 2016, the club ended the affiliation contract with the "Atletismo Chapin" and "CRUXE" Rugby teams.

3,300 new members joined the club in the next season. In the beginning, the team didn't get good results and the coach, Dani Pendín, was sacked and replaced by Antonio Sanchez Franzon, who turned the results around. Pedro Ruiz, responsible for sports affairs, continued in the club despite complaints from the club's partners. Juan Carlos Ramírez was appointed Sports Director.

In 2018 they were promoted to Tercera División.

In the 2018–19 season the team debuted in a national category in a hotly contested competition. Their first game outside Andalusia took place, in a visit to Ceuta in which the "azulinos" won 3–0 against AD Ceuta FC in the Alfonso Murube Stadium.

In the 2020–2021 season, in a competition with two stages due to the COVID-19 pandemic, the team earned promotion to the newly created Segunda Division RFEF

== Stadium ==
Estadio Municipal de Chapín is a multi-purpose stadium in Jerez, Spain, currently used mostly for football matches. It is the home ground of Xerez Deportivo FC. Built in 1988, the stadium holds 20,523 spectators.

In 2002 the stadium was remodelled to accommodate the 2002 FEI World Equestrian Games, the entire grandstand being covered with a roof; a hotel, spa, and gym were added to the complex as well.

Since its foundation in 1988 until 2015, it was the home ground of Xerez CD, since 2013 it has been the home ground of Xerez Deportivo FC and since 2021, it has been the home of both simultaneously.

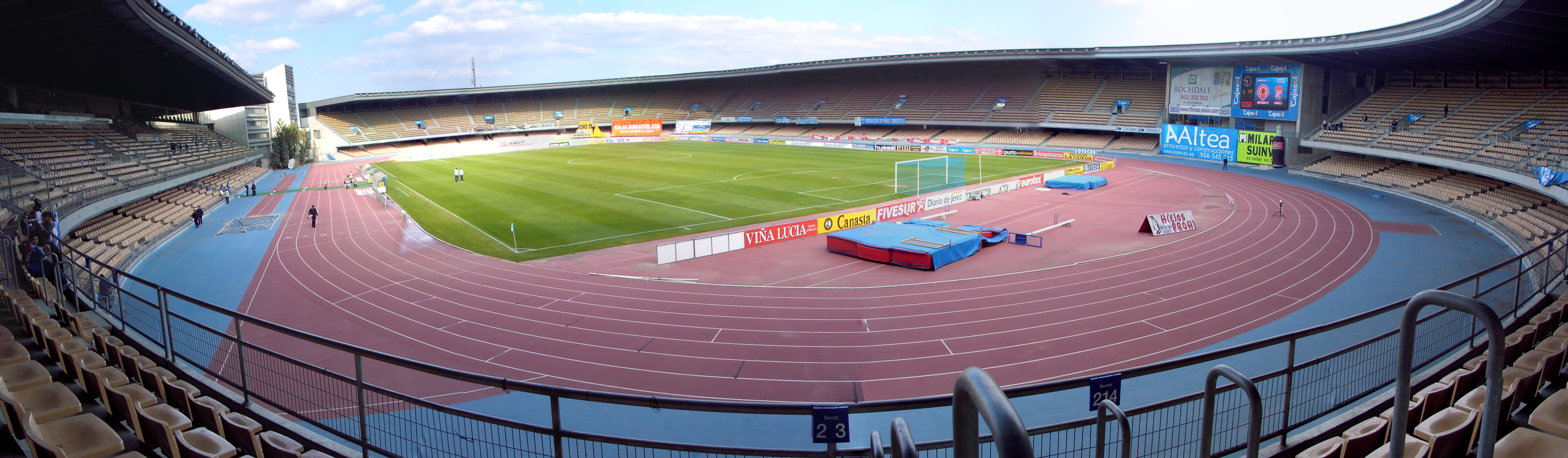
Estadio Municipal de Chapín

== Symbols ==
=== Shield ===
Club shield

The first official shield was exactly the same as the old coat of arms of the city of Jerez de la Frontera. It is surrounded by a circle with the name Xerez Deportivo FC and there is a ball in the middle. In 2018 after a consultation among the partners, it was decided to make a choice to choose a new shield. The process consisted of a voting between different alternatives; finally after three polls, Xerez changed its shield.

=== Anthem ===
- La voz de un pueblo

No existe amor que llegue tanto al corazón

como el que siento por mi equipo.

Mi condición de Xerecista es la razón

por la que vivo los Domingos.

Son mis principios desde chiquillo.

Es mi Xerez el de la rabia y el poder

el de Chapín y su rugido.

Te seguiré a donde quiera que tú estés,

tú vas marcando mis caminos.

Somos la causa de todo lo que vivimos,

somos los de las bulerías y el buen vino.

Por ti me dejo la garganta los Domingos,

son mis principios desde chiquillo.

Y ahora que somos libres

no hay nada que nos pare

azul el sentimiento

de este amor que me invade;

somos la voz de un pueblo

que quiso renacer

con soniquetes meten los goles

sois los mejores ¡Vamos Xerez!

Esta canción la que te canta tu afición

con la que ganas los partidos,

cuando tú juegas se desata la pasión

¡Vamos Xerez todos unidos!

Echo la vista atrás y todo lo que vivimos

son los recuerdos que hacen sentirnos más vivo.

Hermano Xerecista lo hemos conseguido

¡Grítalo fuerte, canta conmigo!

Y ahora que somos libres...

=== Motto ===
Spanish

"Soy xerecista, seré fiel a mi escudo, blanquiazul es mi sangre y mi grito de guerra será: ¡XEREZ!"

English

"I am a Xerecista, I will be faithful to my shield, blue and white is my blood and my war cry will be: XEREZ!"

== Seasons ==
=== Season to season ===
Season	Tier	Division	Place	Copa del Rey
2013–14	8	2ª Prov.	1st	
2014–15	7	3ª And.	1st	
2015–16	6	2ª And.	1st	
2016–17	5	Div. Hon.	6th	
2017–18	5	Div. Hon.	1st	
2018–19	4	3ª	5th	
2019–20	4	3ª	3rd	
2020–21	4	3ª	1st	
2021–22	4	2ª RFEF	10th	First round
2022–23	4	2ª Fed.	14th	
2023–24	5	3ª Fed.	3rd	
2024–25	4	2ª Fed.	12th	
2025–26	4	2ª Fed.	15th	
2026–27	5	3ª Fed.		

- 4 seasons in Segunda Federación/Segunda División RFEF
- 3 seasons in Tercera División
- 2 seasons in Tercera Federación

=== Detailed list of seasons ===
Season	Tier	Division	Pos	Pld	W	D	L	GF	GA	Pts	Top scorer(s)	Goal
2013–14	8	2ª Provincial	1st	34	31	2	1	119	22	95	Barba; Guille	15
2014–15	7	3ª Andaluza	1st	28	25	2	1	126	12	77	Guille	25
2015–16	6	2ª Andaluza	1st	32	29	1	2	92	12	88	Guille	26
2016–17	5	Div. de Honor	6th	38	17	13	8	65	43	63	Tamayo	16
2017–18	5	Div. de Honor	1st	34	23	5	6	59	18	74	Cuenca	12
2018–19	4	3ª División	5th	42	20	17	5	51	24	77	Gallardo	17
2019–20	4	3ª División	3rd	29	17	4	8	44	24	55	Colorado	6
2020–21	4	3ª División	1st	24	15	5	4	35	17	50	Máyor	9
2021–22	4	2ª RFEF	10th	34	13	8	13	28	39	47	Máyor	4
2022–23	4	2ª RFEF	14th	34	10	10	14	30	36	40	Simeone; Aguado	4
2023–24	5	3ª RFEF	3rd	34	18	10	6	50	23	64	Ilias	9

=== Records ===
- Biggest win: Xerez DFC 9–0 CF Español de Vejer (2014–15 season) and Xerez DFC 9–0 Balón de Cádiz CF (2015–16 season)
- Biggest defeat: CD San Roque de Lepe 5–1 Xerez DFC (2019–20 season) and Xerez DFC 1–5 Cordoba CF (2021–22 season)

=== Associates ===
Season	Division	Partners
2013–14	4ª Andaluza	5,865
2014–15	3ª Andaluza	4,104
2015–16	2ª Andaluza	3,641
2016–17	Div. de Honor	3,488
2017–18	Div. de Honor	2,798
2018–19	3ª División	3,086
2019–20	3ª División	3,265
2020–21	3ª División	2,562
2021–22	2ª RFEF	4,091
2022–23	2ª Federación	3,480
2023–24	3ª Federación	4,500+

=== Sports brand and Sponsors ===
Period	Sport brand	Sponsor
2013–14	Brokal	Manuel Alba
2014–15	Brokal	A3 - 81
2015–17	Kipsta	Helvetia
2017–18	Erreà	Galanmatic
2018–19	Erreà	Ranabe
2019–20	Erreà	Prefortia
2020–21	Erreà	Ranabe
2021–22	Umbro	Promo Swipe
2022–24	Umbro	Hipotels
2024–25	Hummel	One Air

== Fundación Xerecismo en Libertad ==
On 23 March 2015, the president and the secretary of Xerez founded Fundación Xerecismo en Libertad, an organisation dedicated to protecting the interests of Xerez Deportivo FC.

=== Área Social ===
Xerez Deportivo supports various charitable causes to promote a better society in the city. Its volunteers work to improve animal welfare, operate soup kitchens, donate blood, and collect toys and food for the needy, among other such activities.

== Current squad ==
As of 1 March 2026

Note: Flags indicate national team as defined under FIFA eligibility rules; some limited exceptions apply. Players may hold more than one non-FIFA nationality.

No.	Pos.	Nation	Player
2	DF	ESP	Marcelo Villaça
3	DF	ESP	Beni
4	DF	NGR	Ekerette Udom
5	DF	ESP	Rubén Cantero (on loan from Hércules)
6	MF	ESP	Rafa Parejo
7	MF	ESP	Javi Feria
8	MF	ESP	Yago Gandoy
9	FW	ITA	Samuele Longo
10	FW	ESP	Sergio García
11	FW	ESP	Ilias Charid
13	GK	ESP	Oier Arribas
14	DF	ESP	David Morante

No.	Pos.	Nation	Player
16	MF	ESP	Curro Rivelott
17	FW	ESP	Christian Dieste
18	DF	ESP	Carlos Daniel Dorado
19	MF	ESP	Diego Iglesias
21	MF	ESP	Juan Ekiza
22	DF	ESP	Juanjo Mateo
23	FW	ESP	Berto González
25	GK	FRA	Florentin Bloch
30	MF	ESP	Domi Iglesias
—	DF	ESP	Mauro Lucero
—	FW	ESP	Álvaro Barrero

== Presidents ==
No.	President	Years
First provisional term	Sixto de la Calle	28 June 2013 – 30 December 2013
1	Jose Ravelo	30 December 2013 – 20 June 2017
2	Rafael Coca	20 June 2017 – 10 June 2021
3	Ignacio de la Calle	10 June 2021 – 25 October 2022
4	Jesús Viloita	25 October 2022 –

== Coaches ==
Coach	Years
(Spain) Carlos Orúe	2013–2015
(Argentina) Daniel Pendín	2015–2016
(Spain) Sánchez Franzón	2016–2017
(Spain) Juan Luis Aguilocho	2017
(Spain) José Masegosa	2017–2019
(Spain) Andrés García Tébar	2019
(Spain) Josu Uribe	2019–2020
(Spain) José Herrera	2020–2022
(Spain) Francis	2022–2023
(Spain) Romerito	2023

== Supporters ==
Governing Bodies of Xerez Deportivo FC

=== Fans ===
In the first season (2013–14), the club. Retrieved 5,865 subscribers, a record for a non-professional club. The next year, in the 2014–15 season, the club. Retrieved 4,102 subscribers.

The General Assembly is formed by all subscribers older than 18 years of age. It is responsible for voting every four years for the board and president of the club. Also each year they gather for the Extraordinary General Meeting where the annual accounts and the financial budget for the following year as well as other important issues are approved.

=== Ultras ===
Kolectivo Sur is the ultras group of Xerez Deportivo FC. It was created in 1991 and it is located in Fondo Sur.

=== Sympathy ===
The main team with which Xerez has a sympathetic relationship is Sevilla FC. Good relations between the fans of Xerez DFC and Sevilla FC are born of their ultras groups, Biris Norte of Sevilla and Kolectivo Sur of Xerez, since the late 20th century due to similarity in the political ideology of both groups, as well as the proximity and characteristics of their cities.

== See also ==
- Xerez CD
- Xerez FC
- Xerez DFC Fútbol Sala
