= Yago Gandoy =

Spanish footballer

Personal information
- Full name: Yago Gandoy Martínez
- Date of birth: 13 April 1999 (age 27)
- Place of birth: A Coruña, Spain
- Height: 1.77 m (5 ft 10 in)
- Position: Midfielder

Team information
- Current team: Xerez Deportivo
- Number: 8

Youth career
- Ural
- 2009–2018: Deportivo La Coruña

Senior career*
Years	Team	Apps	(Gls)
2017–2020	Deportivo B	49	(5)
2019–2021	Deportivo La Coruña	14	(0)
2021–2023	Coruxo	54	(1)
2023–2024	Navalcarnero	29	(0)
2024–2025	SS Reyes	32	(0)
2025–	Xerez Deportivo	33	(1)

International career^{‡}
2015	Spain U16	1	(0)
- * Club domestic league appearances and goals as of 16 May 2026 ‡ National team caps and goals as of 3 June 2020

Yago Gandoy Martínez (born 13 April 1999) is a Spanish professional footballer who plays as a midfielder for Segunda Federación club Xerez Deportivo.

== Club career ==
Gandoy was born in A Coruña, Galicia, and joined Deportivo de La Coruña at the age of ten, from Ural CF. He made his senior debut with the reserves on 10 December 2017, coming on as a late substitute for Martín Bengoa in a 3–2 Segunda División B away win against CCD Cerceda.

Gandoy was definitely promoted to the B's ahead of the 2018–19 season, and scored his first senior goal on 4 November 2018 by netting the second in a 2–1 home success over Rápido de Bouzas. He contributed with 24 appearances (18 starts, 1668 minutes of action) as his side suffered relegation.

Gandoy made his first-team debut on 21 September 2019, replacing Ager Aketxe late into a 0–0 away draw against Cádiz CF in the Segunda División. The following 9 September, after Dépor's relegation, he renewed his contract for three years and was definitely promoted to the main squad.
