= Sergio García (footballer, born 1996) =

Spanish footballer

Personal information
- Full name: Sergio García Blanco
- Date of birth: 27 December 1996 (age 29)
- Place of birth: Rota, Spain
- Height: 1.82 m (6 ft 0 in)
- Position: Winger

Team information
- Current team: Xerez DFC
- Number: 10

Youth career
- 2005–2015: Córdoba

Senior career*
Years	Team	Apps	(Gls)
2013–2016	Córdoba B	32	(2)
2015	Córdoba	1	(0)
2016–2018	Atlético Espeleño	50	(3)
2018–2019	Loja	36	(3)
2019–2020	Ciudad de Torredonjimeno	26	(7)
2020–2022	Antequera	54	(6)
2022–2024	San Roque de Lepe	61	(7)
2024–2025	Avilés Industrial	16	(0)
2025–	Xerez DFC	48	(1)
- * Club domestic league appearances and goals as of 16 May 2026

Sergio García Blanco (born 27 December 1996) is a Spanish footballer who plays for Xerez DFC as a left winger.

== Club career ==
Born in Rota, Cádiz, Andalusia, García joined Córdoba CF's youth setup in 2005, aged nine. He debuted as a senior with the reserves, representing the side in both Segunda División B and Tercera División.

García made his first team – and La Liga – debut on 23 May 2015, coming on as a late substitute for Fidel in a 0–3 away loss against SD Eibar, as his side was already relegated. It was his maiden appearance for the main squad. Subsequently, it represented CA Espeleño and Loja CD in the fourth division.
