= Sergio García (skater) =

Spanish professional vert skater (born 1990)

Sergio Garcia
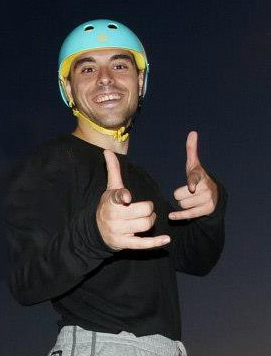

Personal information
- Nationality: Spanish
- Born: July 19, 1990 (age 35) Madrid, Spain

Sport
- Sport: Vert skating
Medal record
Competitions
Representing Spain
Silver medal – second place	2009 Copenhagen, Denmark	Vert

Sergio Garcia is a Spanish professional vert skater. Garcia started skating when he was ten years old in 2000 and turned professional in 2009. Garcia has attended many competitions in his vert skating career.

Best Tricks Double Backflip, McTwist 540.

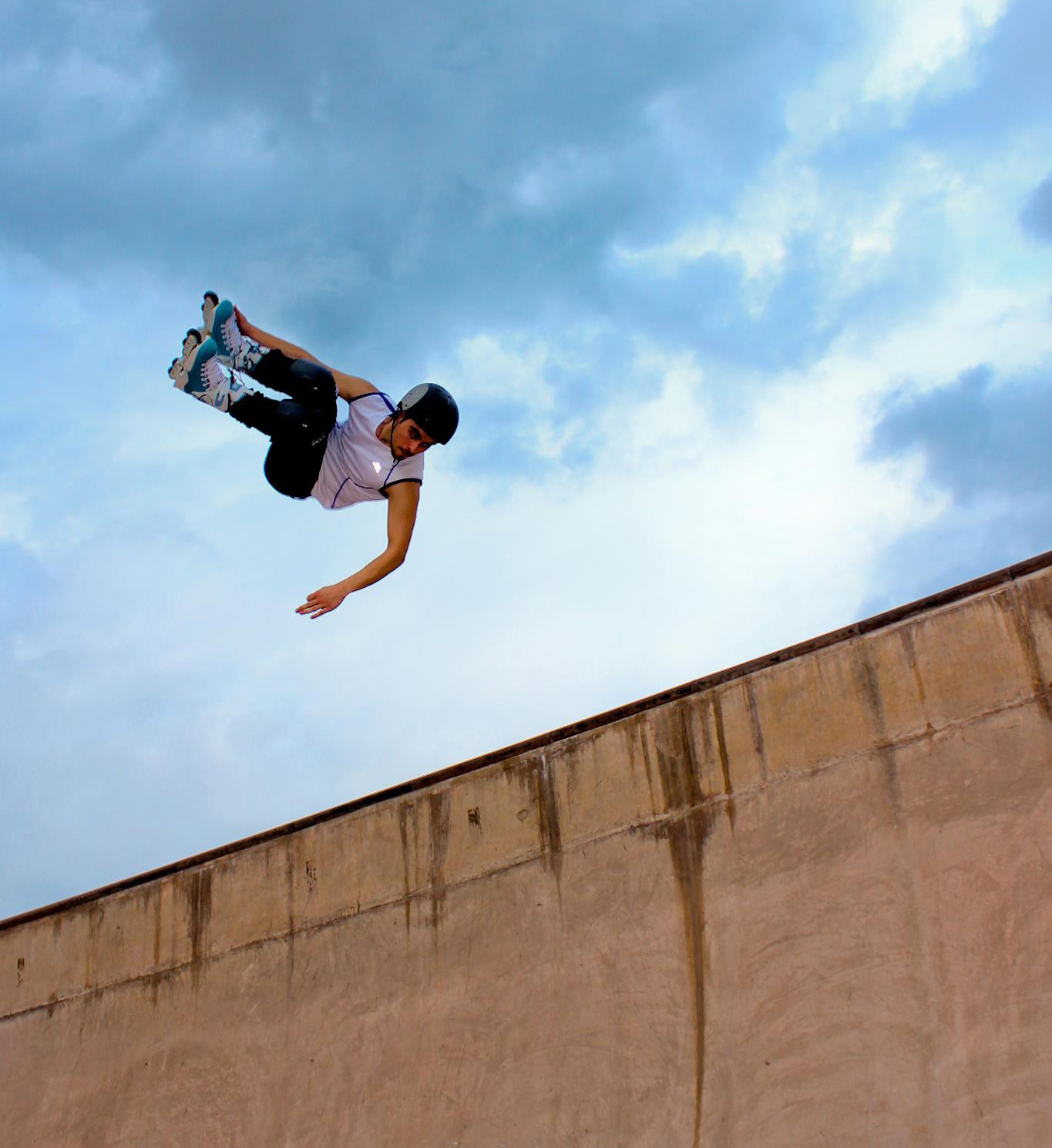
Sergio Vert Skating

== Vert Competitions ==
- 2012 EC Halfpipe Copenhagen - Vert: 7th
- 2009 Broken Bones Tour - Vert: 3rd
