= Sergio García (swimmer) =

Spanish swimmer

Personal information
- Full name: Sergio García Ortíz
- Nationality: Spanish
- Born: 9 October 1989 (age 36) Barcelona, Spain

Sport
- Sport: Swimming

Sergio García Ortíz (Note: In this Spanish name, the first or paternal surname is García and the second or maternal family name is Ortíz.) (born 9 October 1989) is a Spanish swimmer who competed in the 2008 Summer Olympics. Sergio was banned from the 2012 London Olympics due to multiple failures to report for drug testing.
