= Xerez CD =

Association football club in Spain

Xerez
- Full name: Xerez Club Deportivo, S.A.D.
- Nicknames: Xerecistas, La Bulería Mecánica
- Founded: 24 September 1947 (79) as Jerez Club Deportivo
- Ground: Municipal de Chapín
- Capacity: 20,523
- President: Juan Luis Gil
- Manager: Abel Segovia
- League: Segunda Federación – Group 4
- 2025–26: Segunda Federación – Group 4, 4th of 18
- Website: www.xerezclubdeportivo.es
Home colours	Away colours	Third colours

Xerez Club Deportivo, S.A.D. is a Spanish association football club based in the city of Jerez de la Frontera. Founded in 1947, it currently plays in Segunda Federación – Group 4.

== Name ==
When the Kingdom of Castile took Jerez from the Muslims on 9 October 1264 during the period known as the Reconquista, the city was renamed Xerez, representing the phoneme /ʃ/ (which eventually evolved into the current /x/) with the letter x. Shortly thereafter, de la Frontera ("of the Frontier") was added as it was located on the Frontier with the Kingdom of Granada and was a frequent scene of skirmishes between the two kingdoms. More than two centuries later, after the conquest of Granada in 1492, Xerez lost its status as a frontier city definitively, but it did not lose the name.

The first football club in the city, the Jerez Football Club, was followed by the Xerez Fútbol Club, which recovered the classic spelling x instead of the modern j; however, the pronunciation remains the same (/x/ in Spanish, similar to a strong 'h'). The Jerez Club Deportivo, a direct descendant of the former, decided to pay homage to it at the request of former president Pablo Porro Guerrero, through two measures. The first was changing the shirt to the one used by the first club, switching from vertical blue and white stripes to a plain blue shirt. This kit is the current one and only differs from that of Xerez Fútbol Club in that the latter used black socks. The second measure was the recovery of the spelling x, becoming Xerez Club Deportivo. On 29 September 1992, the club was transformed into a Sociedad Anónima Deportiva (Public Limited Sports Company) and adopted its current definitive name: Xerez Club Deportivo Sociedad Anónima Deportiva.

== History ==
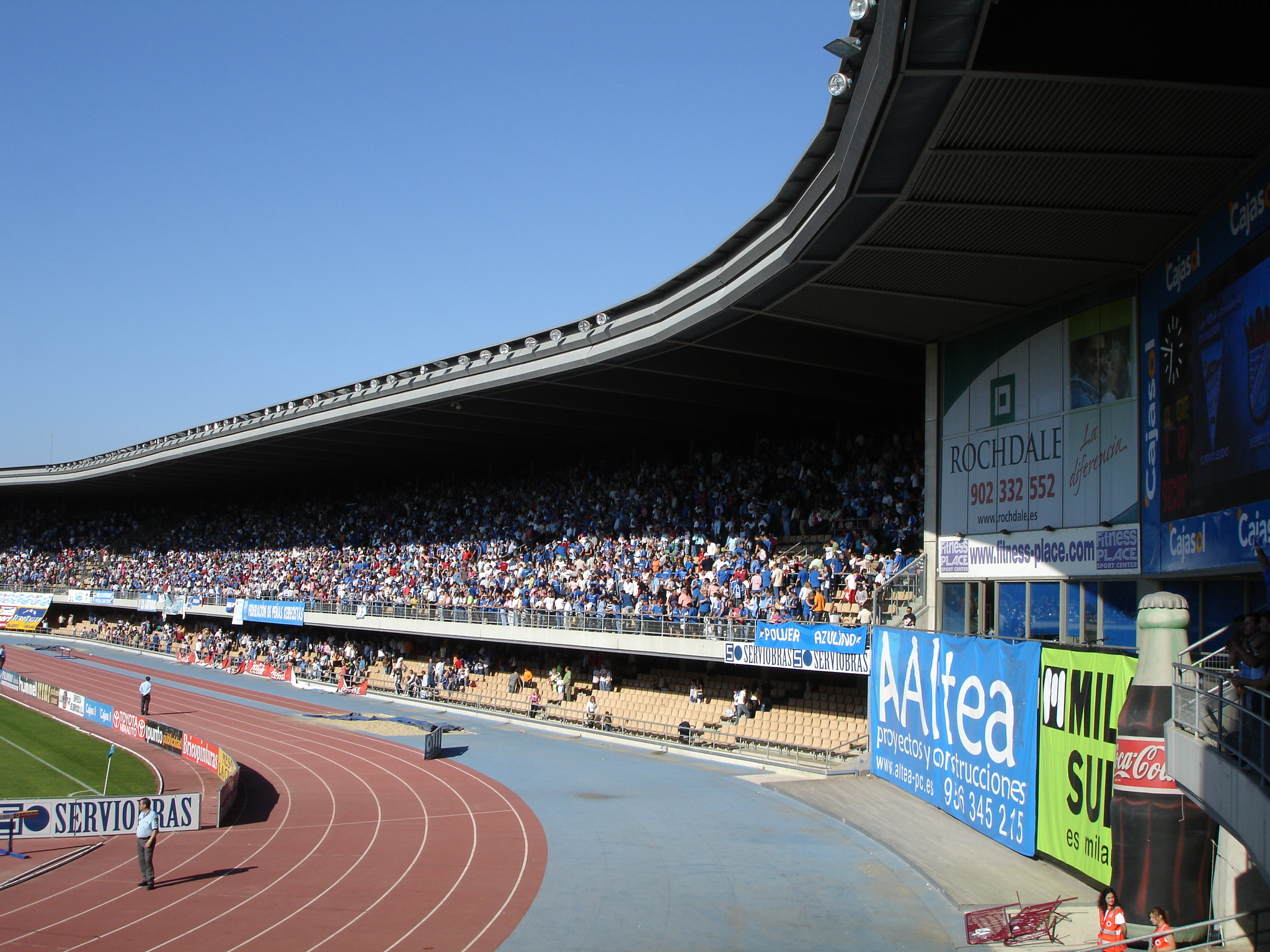
Stand at Estadio Municipal de Chapín, 2007–08 season.

=== Early years ===
Due to the link that Jerez established with the United Kingdom via the export of its Sherry wine to England, football began to be practiced informally in the city very early on. The first written record of football in Jerez dates from 1 November 1870 and appeared in the newspaper "El Progreso"; it reads: "We know that today a game of Cricket will be played, in the immediate site of the hippodrome, whose spectacle will begin at twelve o'clock sharp in the morning. In the afternoon, the fans of bumps will enjoy a while of foot-ball". Other early notes appearing in Jerez publications about football date from 1876 and 1884. The first one reads "new sport of strange rules and complicated foreign words", in the second note it reads "amusements of employees of English export firms based in Jerez fond of the goal".

In subsequent years there is talk of a football society in Jerez, but due to the little importance the new sport had, not many references are made to it. The clearest allusion is from 1887, when a news item appears reporting that "the Jerez society" will pay for the travel of some English sailors from the Port of Cadiz to Jerez to play a friendly match.

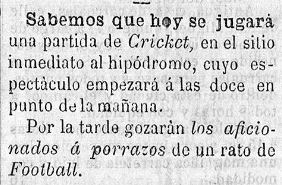
Newspaper El Progreso, 1 November 1870.

=== Xerez Fútbol Club ===
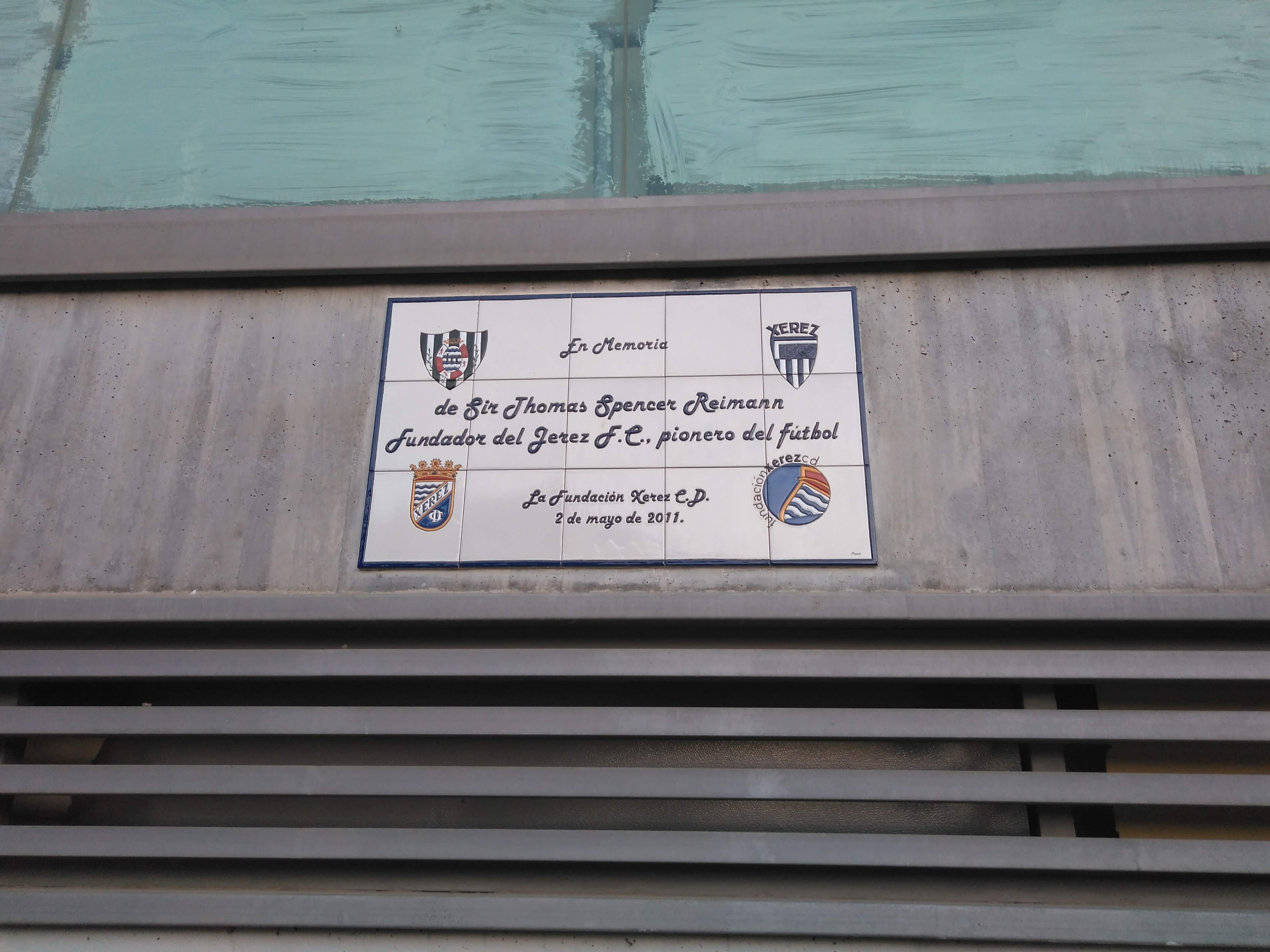
Plaque in honor of Sir Thomas Spencer.

A few years later, the great introducer of football in Jerez appeared, Sir Thomas Spencer, an employee of the Bodega William & Humbert. He was the creator, president, player, and captain of the "Sociedad Jerez Foot-Ball Club". This was the first society of which there are clear references in Jerez and dates from 1907. It started with a simple white kit, but soon changed to blue and white colors. Other early Jerez teams were "Fortuna Foot-Ball Club" (yellow and black stripes) in 1908, which was later absorbed by Sociedad Jerez; "Jerez Balompié" (blue and claret stripes) in 1912, and "España-Mundo Nuevo F.C." (red and white stripes) in 1913. Other teams referenced in newspapers of the time are "Jerez Bote Club", "Racing Jerezano", "Club Deportivo Hércules de Jerez" and "Jerez Sporting Club", but due to their short lives, there are not many references to them, except isolated mentions.

Despite this proliferation of teams, Sociedad Jerez Foot-Ball Club was the most important team in the city and, due to the diverse ways of referring to its nomenclature in the newspapers of the time, it is named as Jerez, Xerez, Xerez F.C., Jerez F.C. or Xerez Club. The merger with "Fortuna F.C." soon arrived and its activity was intermittent. It is doubted if it was created even before the year 1907 and the Jerez society alluded to in 1887 in a match with "English sailors" was this same society.

One of the most important re-foundations the team had was in December 1933, with José Manuel Domecq Rivero as president. The Villa Mercedes football field was designated as the home ground, the construction of the Estadio Domecq was announced, and this time the official name was Xerez Fútbol Club. The most important milestones of this team were playing in the promotion phase to La Liga twice and reaching the quarter-finals of the Copa del Rey (1943), where they were eliminated by Real Madrid.

=== Foundation of Xerez Club Deportivo and early years ===
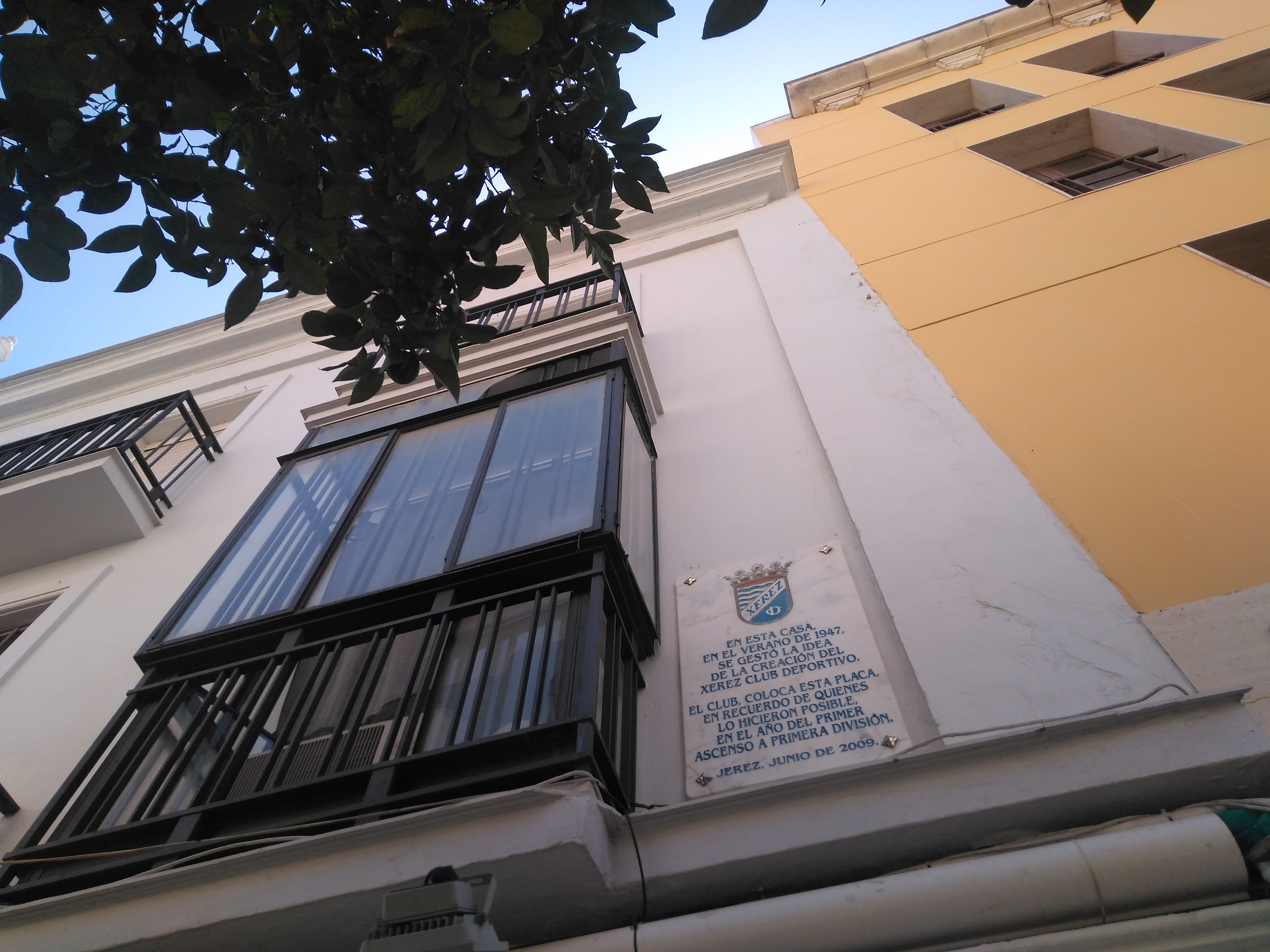
Plaque in tribute to the Foundation of Xerez CD.

On 4 June 1942, Club Deportivo Jerez was constituted as a reserve team of Xerez Fútbol Club. Both clubs shared facilities and stadium. Highlights of that era include consecutive Pichichi trophies in the second division in 1943/44 and 1944/45 by Pato Araujo, with the team close to being promoted to the first division.

Due to a combination of poor sporting and economic results, the disappearance of Xerez Fútbol Club was announced on 26 August 1946, and the board reorganized leading the reserve team Club Deportivo Jerez which remained as an independent team. On 24 September 1947, the club was refounded with the name "Jerez Club Deportivo". On 21 August 1963, the name was changed to "Xerez Club Deportivo" in honor of the original Xerez Fútbol Club, which in turn refers to the name of the city after the Christian reconquest.

The current club took, scrupulously and contrary to most football clubs that ignore new re-foundations, the date of September 1947 as its founding date. In reality, it could have taken any of the previous important dates as the founding date, since the history of football in Jerez since its arrival has been a gradual transfer through different people taking over. If the sports society had made the same decision as most football clubs, it could have taken 1876 as the founding date (because the "Football Society" of Jerez already existed then), 1907 or 1911 with the foundation of "Sociedad Jerez Foot-Ball Club", 1914 for the merger with "Fortuna Foot-Ball Club", 1922 for the first reappearance of Jerez FC, 1933 for its second reappearance, or 1946 when CD Jerez was intervened.

==== 1950s ====
This is one of the golden decades of Xerecismo. After the impossibility of promotion to Segunda División in the 40s due to the "high national interest" of the dictatorial regime, which decided to promote España de Tánger, the club was promoted and allowed to play for the first time in Segunda División (1953–1954), where it managed to remain for five consecutive years. Notable signings included Rafa Verdú (later a prominent figure in the club's management). The first official Jerez derby was played between Jerez CD and Jerez Industrial (1958).

Also noteworthy is the creation of the Trofeo de la Vendimia, in whose first edition (1952) FC Barcelona defeated Jerez C.D. 6–3.

Two Segunda División B championships were achieved.

==== 1960s ====
It was difficult for Jerez to regain the second division status despite dominating the third division in this decade, winning two championships and four runner-up spots; only in 1967 did it have a fleeting stint in the silver category of Spanish football, remaining for a single season.

The name was changed from Jerez C.D. to Xerez C.D.

==== 1970s ====
Another Third Division championship was achieved, leading the team back to the second division, but the joy lasted only one season. In the 1973–1974 season, they were close to the relegation places, which would have been a major setback. The division system was remodeled and Xerez moved to Segunda B.

==== 1980s ====
Two Segunda División B championships were won, both rewarded with promotion to Segunda División. The first was again an ephemeral passage, but the second, achieved with a goal by Antonio Poyatos, was the beginning of a golden era of 5 years where at times they fought with teams at the top of the table.

Xerez signed a black player for the first time in its history, "El Pantera" Benítez.

In 1988, the mythical Estadio Domecq was left behind to move to play at Estadio Municipal de Chapín, which was inaugurated in a match against Real Madrid.

==== 1990s ====
It was hard for Xerez to get out of Segunda División B, although in a historic season with local players, in 1996/97, one of the most awaited promotions was achieved against Gramanet, which only served to remain for one season in Segunda División.

In 1992 Xerez became a Sociedad Anónima Deportiva (Public Limited Sports Company), so the club ceased to belong to the members and passed into the hands of shareholders.

In the 1994–95 season, the first victory at the Estadio Ramón de Carranza was achieved, with a goal by Javi Peña.

In 1997, businessman Luis Oliver took over the presidency of the club, promoting the team from Segunda División B to Segunda División, although his initially good relations with the City Council deteriorated.

=== 21st Century ===
==== 2000s ====
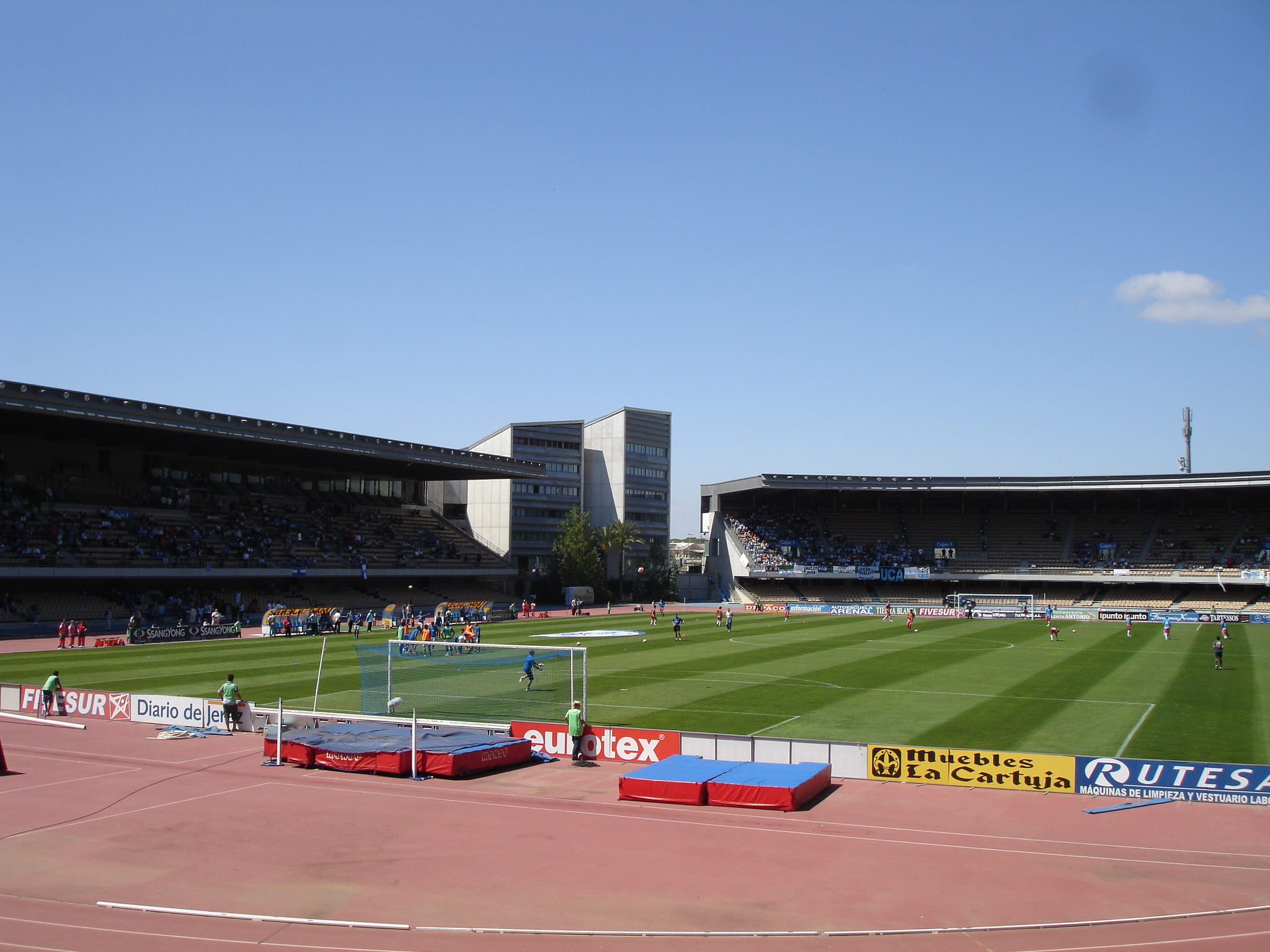
Pitch and hotel.

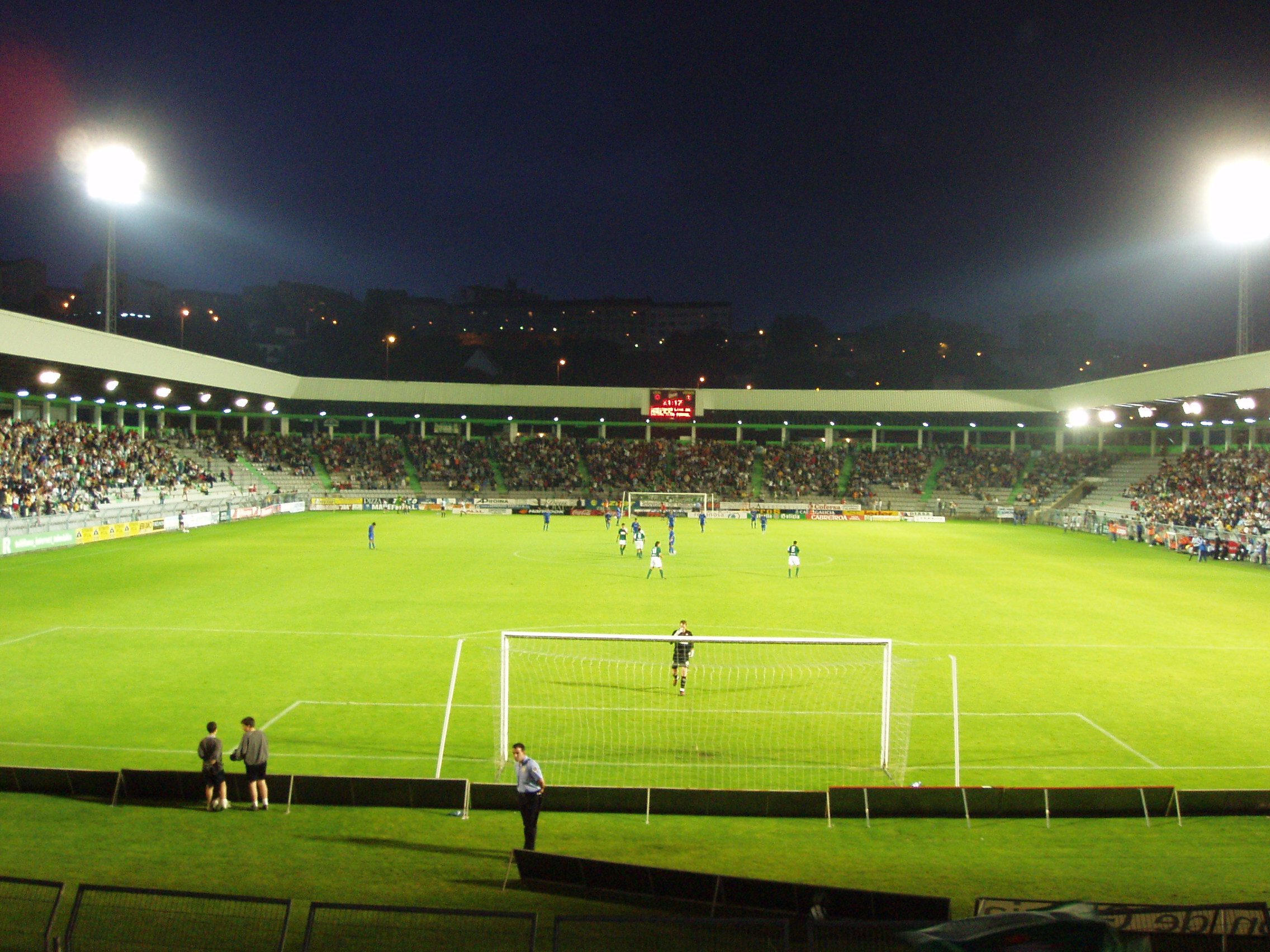
Match between Racing de Ferrol and Xerez CD played in 2005.

With the year 2001 came a new promotion of Xerez to Segunda División, consummated with a 2–0 victory against CD Toledo at the Estadio Municipal de Chapín, a success that caused a huge pitch invasion by the fans. A new stage opened for the Xerez entity, which from the first moment would seek success in the silver division of Spanish football.

On the other hand, on the extra-sporting level, the City Council denounced Luis Oliver, majority shareholder and president of the entity.

During the 2001–02 season, the first after its return to the category, Xerez was very close to achieving promotion to La Liga, with Bernd Schuster as coach. However, the club's precarious economic situation, which kept the players unpaid and forced the team to play many home matches in Sanlúcar de Barrameda, decisively influenced a resounding fall in the last 8 matchdays, in which they were only able to get 4 points, wasting a very important cushion of points with respect to the fourth classified. Finally, on 19 May 2002, Xerez lost 2–1 against Recreativo de Huelva, coached by Lucas Alcaraz, saying goodbye definitively to promotion.

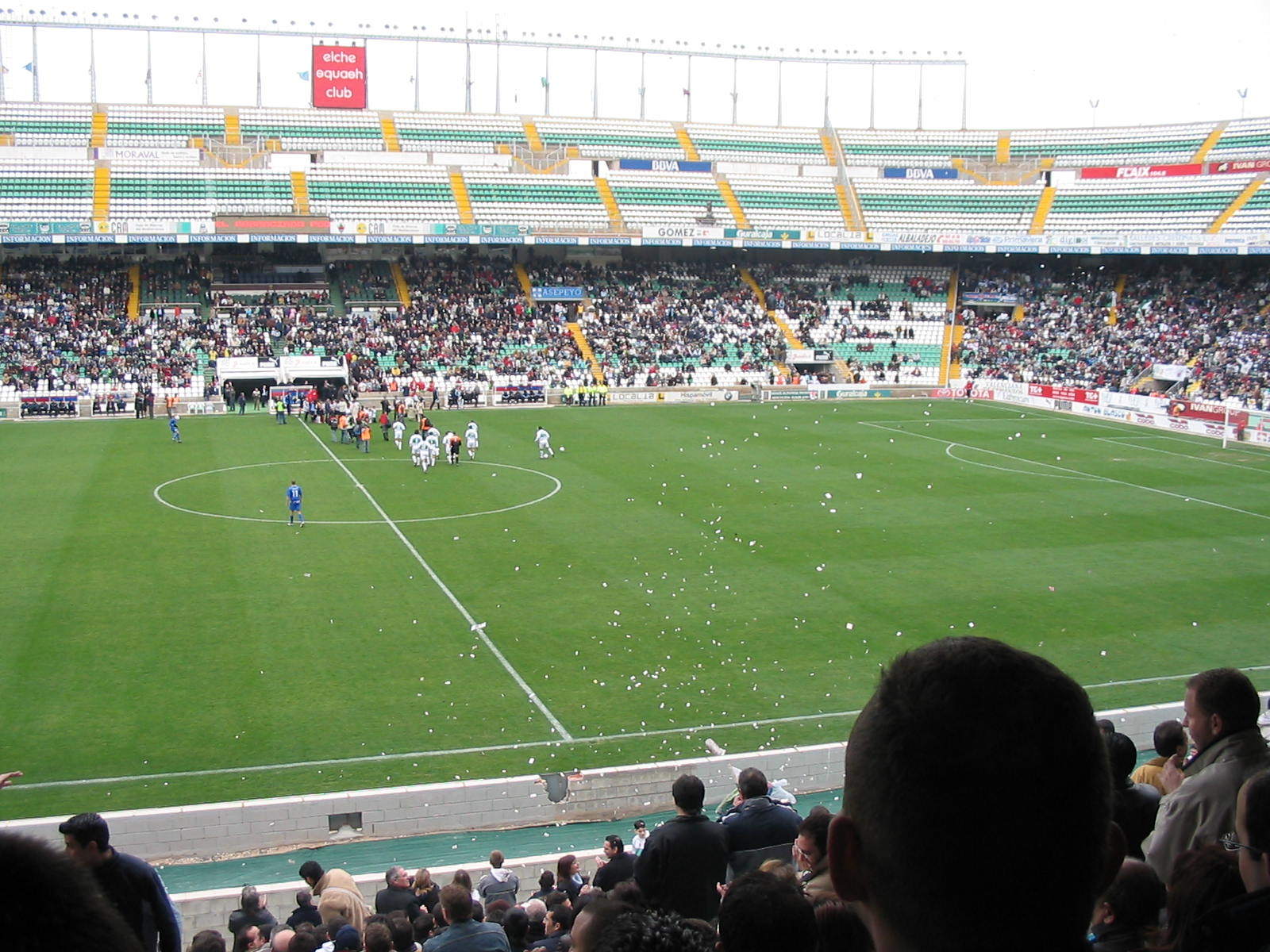
Match against Elche CF.

In subsequent seasons, it established itself as one of the constant contenders for promotion and imposing itself as one of the strongest teams in the championship (despite remaining in economic hardships that even forced the players to appear semi-naked in a magazine as a sign of protest). In the 2005–06 season, coached by Lucas Alcaraz, they managed to be winter champions only to fall into an inexplicable negative streak and finish seventh in the League. A similar situation was experienced in the 2006–07 season, with Pepe Murcia on the bench, where the team occupied promotion places between the 3rd and 17th matchdays, but deflated again in the second round and finished 9th.

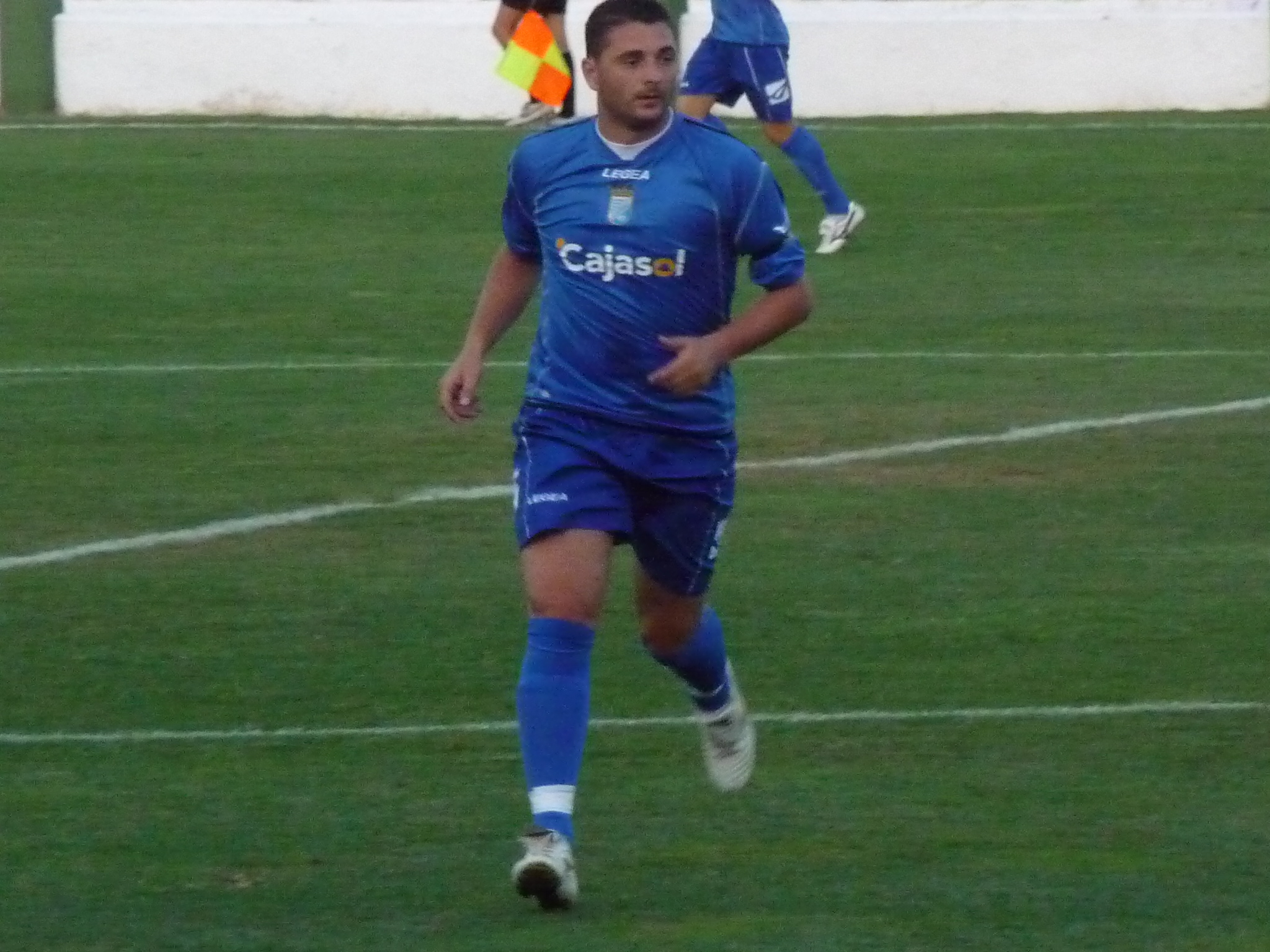
Emilio Viqueira.

During the 2007–08 season, Xerez remained in the relegation zone for 28 matchdays. On 12 January 2008, after a resounding defeat against UD Las Palmas (0–3) and 10 games without winning, the president and majority shareholder Joaquín Morales presented his resignation in a press conference, which ultimately did not become effective. The coach, Juan Martínez Casuco (who had previously replaced the resigned Miguel Ángel Rondán), was sacked after losing to Numancia (0–3) in the 24th matchday. His successor was Esteban Vigo who, despite taking charge of a team that seemed doomed and starting with 3 consecutive defeats, managed to save Xerez from relegation in the last matchday, after achieving 8 consecutive home victories (a historical club record). That season, the Xerez striker Yordi won the Pichichi Trophy and Zarra Trophy of the Segunda División, with 20 goals scored, 9 of them from penalties.

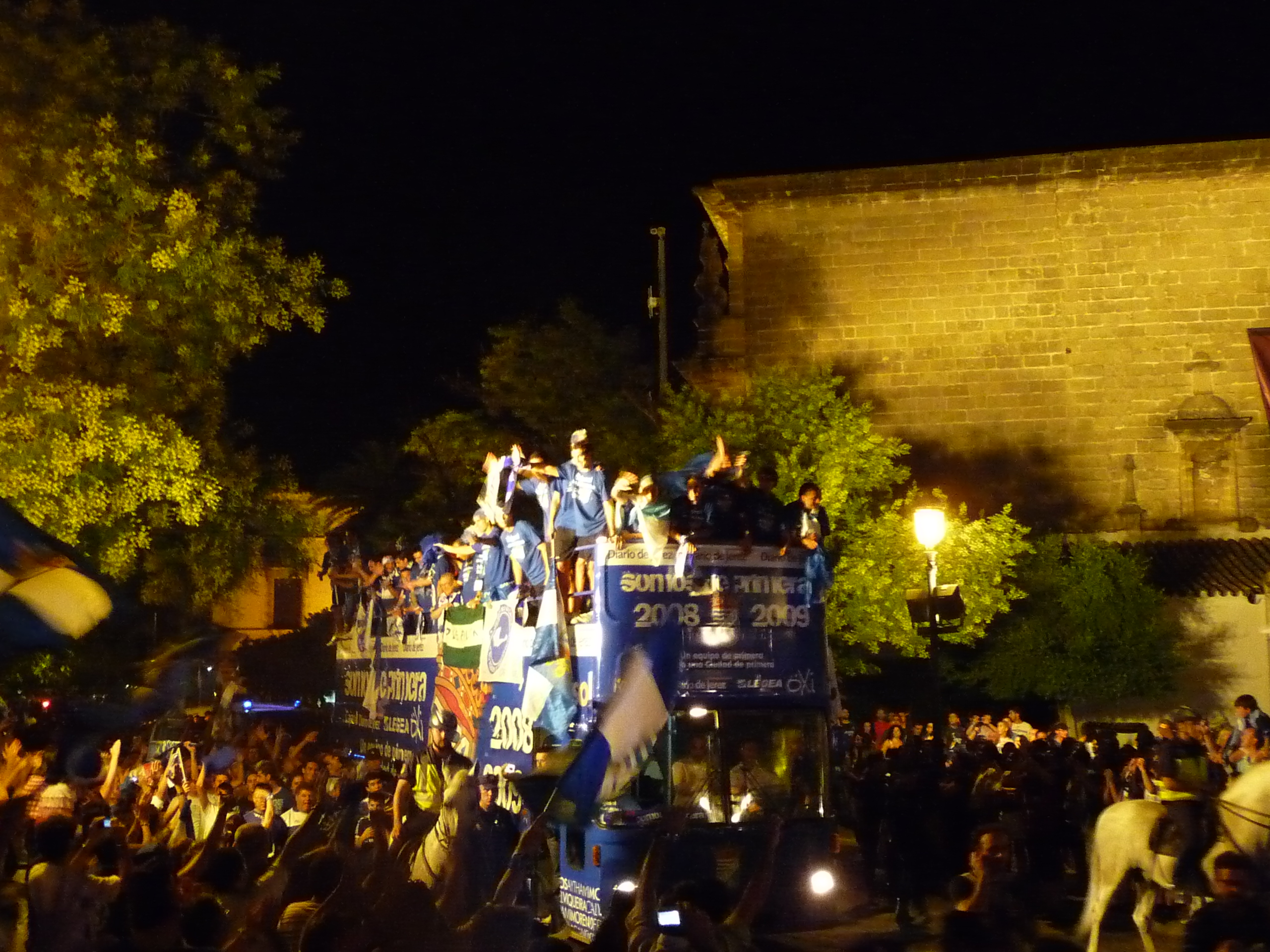
Promotion celebration.

On 19 June 2008, the majority shareholder and president, Joaquín Morales, announced in a press conference the sale of his shares to Francisco Garrido, a businessman born in Espera but based in Jerez de la Frontera. However, the sale did not materialize, and Morales began negotiating the sale with Sevillian businessman Francisco Nuchera. The agreement became unofficial on 12 September 2008, although Xerez did not release details due to the lack of signatures before a notary. The Mayor of Jerez de la Frontera, Pilar Sánchez, announced that the City Council would continue to support the club. This operation ultimately did not happen, with Joaquín Morales remaining as the maximum shareholder.

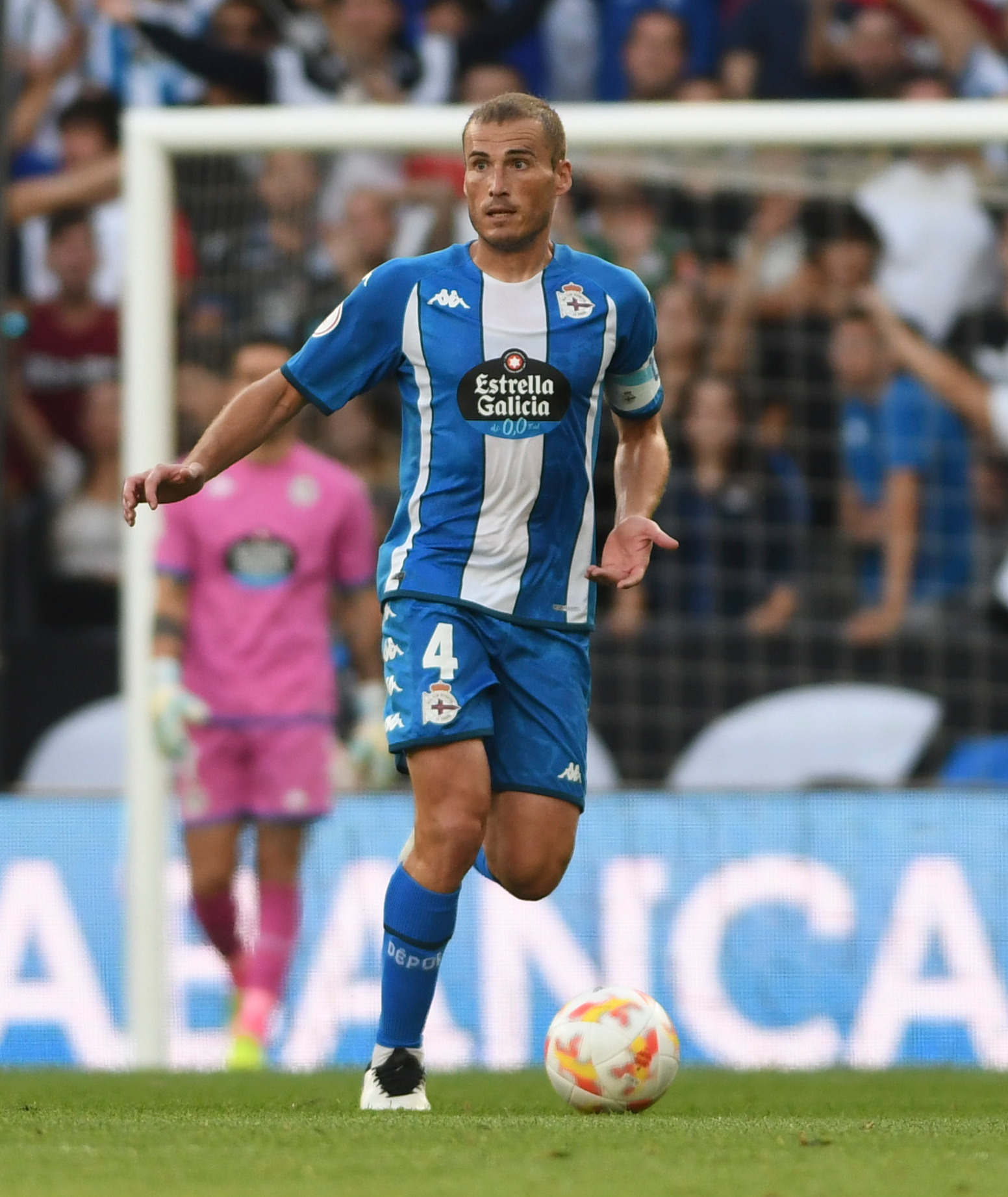
Álex Bergantiños was a starter in the historic promotion to La Liga in the 2008–09 season.

After this "in extremis" salvation, in the 2008/09 season, after an excellent start, Xerez surprised everyone by finishing the first half as winter champions and finding themselves in promotion places to La Liga as category leaders. Some professionals described the team as one of the best squads in the club's history.

On 19 March 2009, youth coordinator and former goalkeeper Carlos Osma became the new President, replacing Joaquín Bilbao, who resigned after being involved in an altercation for which he had to testify before a judge, after which he was released without charges. On 30 May 2009, the team led by Esteban Vigo, after a spectacular season, practically sealed promotion to La Liga after beating SD Eibar 3–0, which was mathematically achieved on 13 June by beating SD Huesca at home 2–1. Additionally, in the last matchday, the team managed to finish as champions of Segunda División. It was undoubtedly a totally unexpected success, as the Andalusian team had barely achieved permanence in the previous season and faced a significant lack of signings before starting the new campaign.

However, shortly after, bad news arrived for the Xerez fans: Esteban Vigo, the coach considered the main architect of the promotion, did not receive a renewal proposal from the board and left for Hércules CF. This provoked protests and incidents against the majority shareholder, Joaquín Morales.

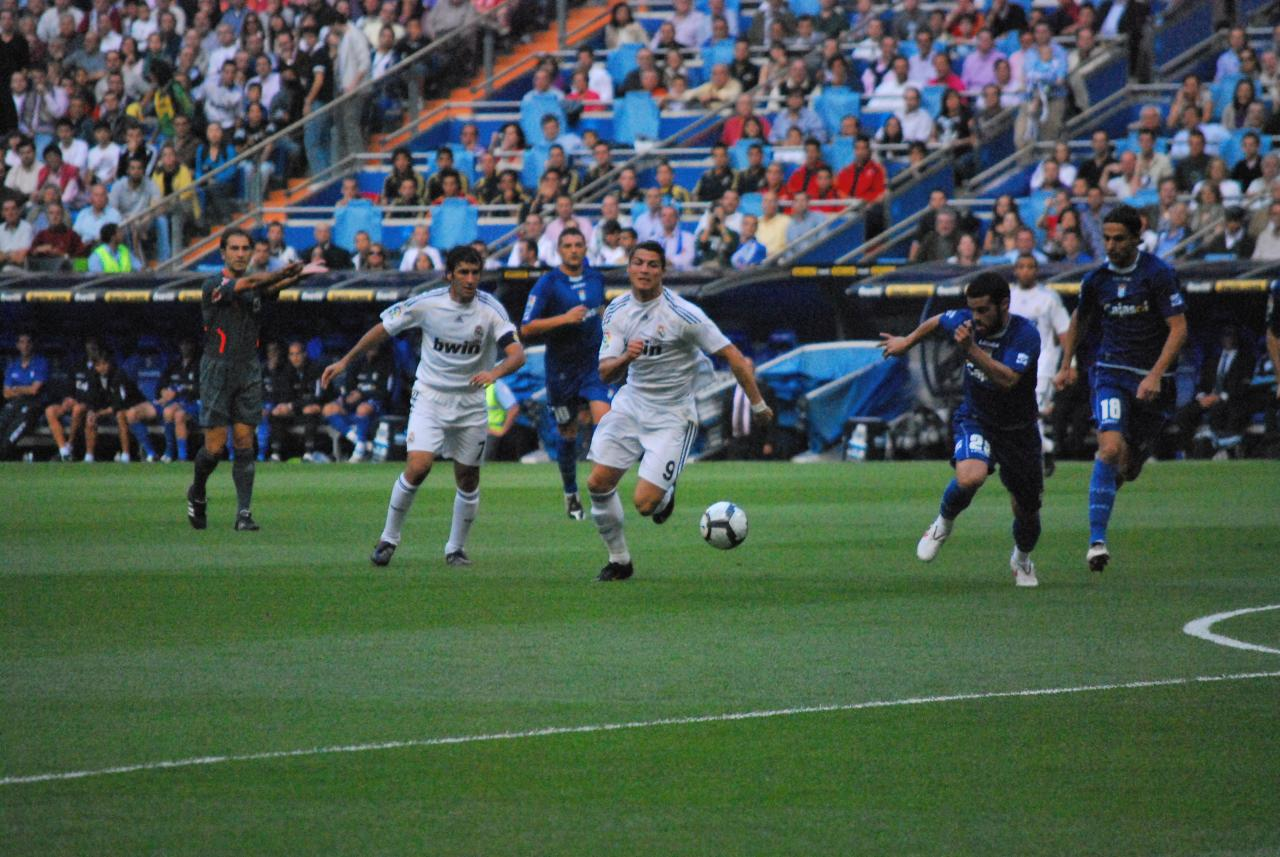
La Liga match at Real Madrid's stadium.

On 15 July 2009, the Fundación Xerez Club Deportivo was registered in Seville, independent of the S.A.D., with objectives including social goals such as the dissemination of sporting values in youth through academy management, dissemination of football history in Jerez, and management of future sports infrastructure. The foundation's board had eleven trustees distributed among the club, City Council, Provincial Council, veterans, and fan clubs. The first President of the Foundation was Juan Carlos González Benítez.

==== 2010s ====
In January 2010, coach José Ángel Ziganda was dismissed due to poor results in the debut in La Liga (only 7 points in 18 matches), preceding the arrival of a new owner, although Antonio Poyatos had to act as interim coach for one match. However, after a turbulent end to 2009 off the pitch, an Argentine business group led by Federico Souza acquired the majority of shares from Joaquín Morales, on 15 January 2010. The chosen coach was Néstor Gorosito, who managed to change the team's face and start a positive streak.

However, despite staying in the fight for permanence until the last matchday, the team finally sealed its relegation to Segunda División after drawing 1–1 against CA Osasuna, as Xerez needed to win and rely on other results.

With the return to Segunda División, the club entered a new phase, directed by bankruptcy administrators, with Emilio Viqueira as sports director and Javi López as coach. Key players left, replaced by veterans like Pablo Redondo, Barber, José Mari and Gerard Autet.

On 23 February 2011, a new Board was formed with Antonio Millán Garrido as president. The 2010–11 season ended in 8th place. For the 2011–12 season, Juan Merino was hired but was dismissed after 16 matchdays, replaced by Vicente Moreno.

In early 2012, debt reached almost 29 million euros. Jesús Gómez Martos bought shares but left shortly after. The team saved itself from relegation.

In July 2012, the bankruptcy process concluded, returning power to Joaquín Morales. For the 2012–13 season, Esteban Vigo returned, but after a terrible run, he was dismissed. His replacement, Carlos Ríos, could not prevent relegation to Segunda División B, ending a 12-year professional spell.

On 28 June 2013, Xerez Deportivo FC was born by fans to replace Xerez CD, which was on the verge of dissolution. On 1 August 2013, Xerez CD was administratively relegated to Tercera División due to debts with players. The club also lost the use of Chapín stadium and had to play in various grounds in the province (La Granja, Rota, etc.).

After several seasons of instability, relegation to regional leagues (1ª Andaluza), and financial struggles, the club managed to return to Tercera División in 2017.

In October 2017, Ricardo García and the Energy group left, and a group involving Luis Oliver Albesa and Afición Xerecista took over management.

On 16 January 2019, the club exited the judicial liquidation process. In the 2019–20 season, debts almost prevented the team from competing, but fundraising allowed them to play.

==== 2020s ====
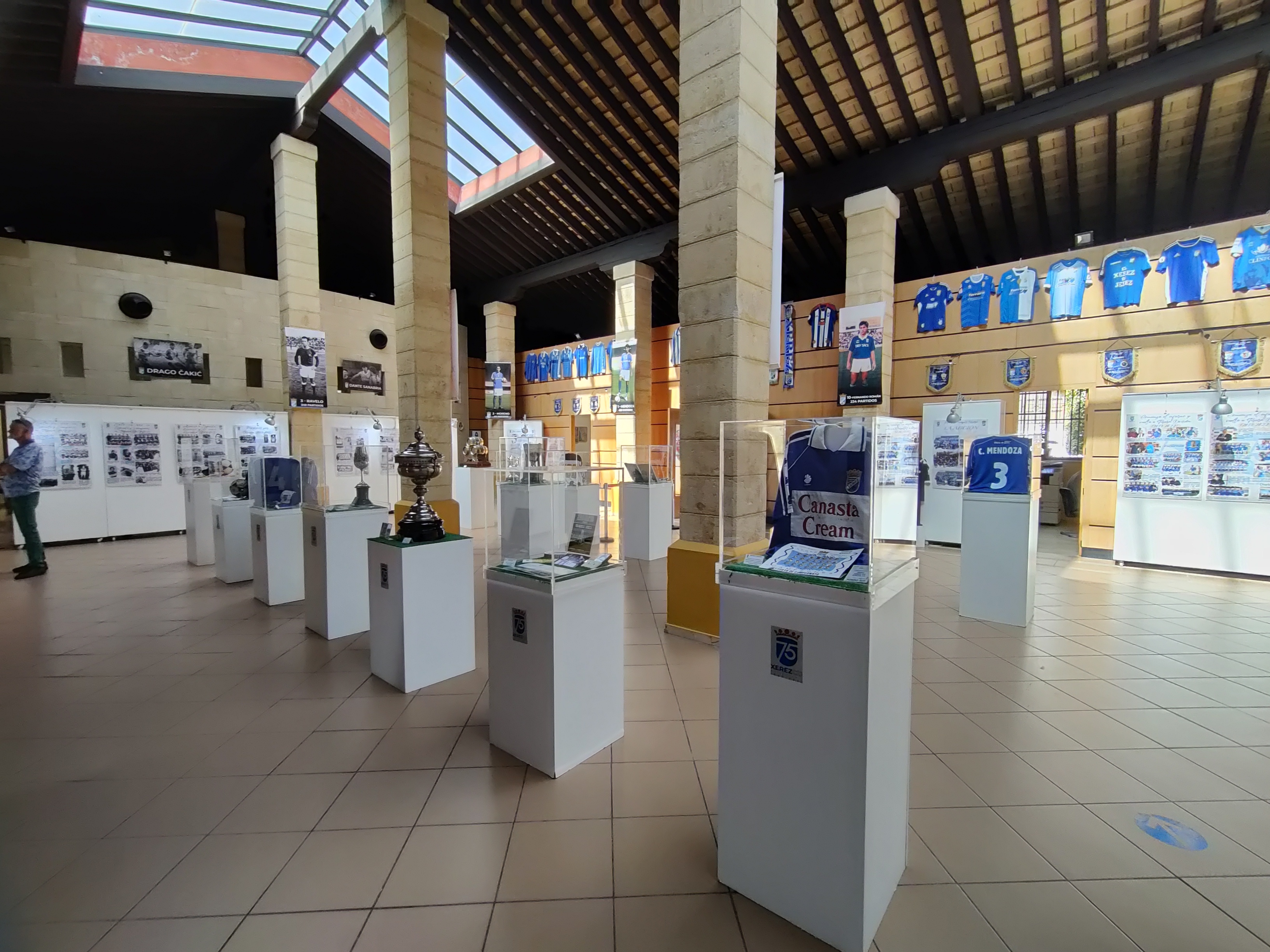
75th Anniversary Exhibition

In 2022, the club celebrated its 75th anniversary with a match against Cádiz CF.

In the 2023–24 season, the team achieved the feat of being the only team in the big five leagues not to concede a goal after 9 matchdays. In matchday 33, after beating CD Gerena 2–0, Xerez CD secured promotion to Segunda Federación virtually.

In the 2024–25 season, Xerez Club Deportivo secured permanence in the category several matchdays before the end of the championship, which kept their chances of playing the promotion play-off to Primera Federación alive. However, these possibilities faded after dropping points against teams from the lower zone, such as CD Don Benito and CF Villanovense. In matchday 33, after the defeat against Xerez DFC, coach Checa announced that he would not continue leading the team the following season.

For the 2025–26 season, Xerez Club Deportivo incorporated Diego Galiano as coach, a technician from Jerez with extensive experience in Segunda Federación, recognized for his experience at Atlético Antoniano.

On 27 June, Xerez CD was the protagonist of prominent news following the publication of the annual list of debtors of the Spanish Tax Agency. Although the information was officially disseminated by the club that same day, it had already been advanced hours earlier by the tax body. According to this list, the blue entity had achieved a substantial reduction of its debt with the Treasury, which went from exceeding eight million euros in the previous year to standing slightly above two million in 2025, representing a decrease of approximately 85%. This improvement in the club's economic situation could be further accentuated in the next fiscal year, as part of the pending debt would be subject to prescription, which could reduce the amount owed to just 400 euros.

== Symbols ==
=== Shield ===
The shield of Xerez Club Deportivo was designed during the summer of 1947 by Mariano Aricha de Vicente.

The shield is clearly inspired by the coat of arms of the city of Jerez de la Frontera, incorporating the same colors. It is divided into two parts by a white diagonal strip that spans from the top right to the bottom left corner. In the upper left part is the central motif of the city's coat of arms, the blue waves on a silver (white) background. In the lower right corner, the letters C and D are intertwined in white on a blue background. The shield is crowned, like the city's coat of arms, this time with a five-point crown.

Inside the diagonal strip, "XEREZ" can be read in blue. Originally it was designed with the word "JEREZ". The "J" was replaced by an "X" due to the initiative of president Pablo Porro Guerrero, who on 21 August 1963 decided to recover the word "Xerez" to refer to the club from which it proceeds, the Xerez Fútbol Club.

The shield received a second modification in the year 2000, where the tone of the color was changed, making it a little softer and with less saturation. This minor aesthetic change was made so that the shield would stand out more on the dark blue of the uniform. Occasionally, the shield is usually depicted outside the kit with the original darker tone.

On 31 May 2017, it was announced that the patent of the shield, as well as the name "Xerez Club Deportivo", became part of Afición Xerecista.

In September 2020, for a new sports project, the club's design team decided to restyle the shield, eliminating the black outlines of its predecessor, with a cleaner and more current look. It was also adapted to different versions (positive and negative).

Blue Version	Black Version	White Version

=== Anthems and chants ===
Anthem

The official anthem of the club was composed by Manuel Amezcua.

Xerez Deportivo
Con los colores del Xerez todos unidos
Xerez Deportivo
El corazón de la afición está contigo
Xerez Deportivo
Vamos arriba campeón
A triunfar y a ganar
Para alcanzar la gloria del mejor
Para subir y conseguir
Con el Xerez el más alto galardón.

A ti Xerez Deportivo
Por tu entrega y tu pundonor
Por tu furia y tu fuerza
Por tu coraje y ambición de gol
Por eso todos cantamos
Como si fuera una misma voz
Viva el Xerez Club Deportivo
Aupa y arriba campeón

¡Xerez!
¡Xerez!
¡Xerez!
¡Xerez!

75th Anniversary Anthem

To commemorate 75 years, the club chose the one composed by Manuel de Cantarote.

Un equipo, una ciudad que es de bandera
Una afición que te acompaña a donde quiera
Que por ti lucha sin importar la batalla
Y alza tu himno y tus colores donde vayas
Azul y blanco es el compás de mis latidos
Sabes que nunca nos daremos por vencido
Y aunque el olvido haya ganado a la memoria
Seguimos vivos y cantamos nuestra historia

¡Xerez!
¡Gol y bulería!
¡Club del alma mía!
¡Donde moriré!
¡Xerez!
¡Aunque pase el tiempo!
¡Más que un sentimiento, que no abandoné!
¡Xerez!
¡Gol y bulería!
¡Club del alma mía!
¡Donde moriré!
¡Xerez!
¡Aunque pase el tiempo!
¡Más que un sentimiento, que no abandoné!

Llenos de orgullo defendemos nuestro escudo
Yo sigo fiel porque Xerez tan solo hay uno
Club Deportivo, símbolo de nuestra tierra
A ti te animo aunque ganes o aunque pierdas
Xerez contigo seguiré cumpliendo años
En ti confío, siempre seguiré animando
Eres equipo que al destino desafía
Lucha con garra, no te rindas todavía

¡Xerez!
¡Gol y bulería!
¡Club del alma mía!
¡Donde moriré!
¡Xerez!
¡Aunque pase el tiempo!
¡Más que un sentimiento, que no abandoné!
¡Xerez!
¡Gol y bulería!
¡Club del alma mía!
¡Donde moriré!
¡Xerez!
¡Aunque pase el tiempo!
¡Más que un sentimiento, que no abandoné!
¡Xerez!
¡Gol y bulería!
¡Club del alma mía!
¡Donde moriré!
¡Xerez!
¡Aunque pase el tiempo!
¡Más que un sentimiento, que no abandoné!

Hools XCD 10th Anniversary Anthem

The support group "Hools XCD", in honor of 10 years, released their anthem with "El Pirata".

Después de diez años
Seguimos aquí luchando
Te juré amor eterno
En las puertas del infierno
Aquí estuvimos, aquí estamos y aquí estaremos
En las buenas, en las malas y en las peores

Mil días de borrachera
Noches enteras sin descansar
Por defender nuestro equipo
Siempre al borde del delíto
Corduras con colgaeras
El mismo escudo tatuado en la piel
Y hasta el día en que me muera
Esos colores defenderé

De Jerez de la Frontera
Puros como la Paquera
Que nunca pasa de moda
Igualito que las drogas
Nos dicen yonkis gitanos
Y pa' nosotros es un alago
En las buenas y en las malas
Como hinchada nos la maman

¡Somos los Hools el alma de este equipo!
¡Sangre azul, Xerez Club Deportivo!
Tienes que ganar
Y la vamos a liar
¡Somos los Hools el alma de este equipo!
¡Sangre azul, Xerez Club Deportivo!
Tienes que ganar
Y la vamos a liar

Mil horas de carretera
Jamás te abandonaría
Recordaré estas palabras
Que son pa' toda la vida
Toxicamente adictivos
Incansables luchadores
Levantaré tu bandera
Sin peros ni condiciones

De Jerez de la Frontera
Puros como la Paquera
Que nunca pasa de moda
Igualito que las drogas
Nos dicen yonkis gitanos
Y pa' nosotros es un alago
En las buenas y en las malas
Como hinchada nos la maman

¡Somos los Hools el alma de este equipo!
¡Sangre azul, Xerez Club Deportivo!
Tienes que ganar
Y la vamos a liar
¡Somos los Hools el alma de este equipo!
¡Sangre azul, Xerez Club Deportivo!
Tienes que ganar
Y la vamos a liar

Que escandalera cuando no llega el gol
Y los Hools te aceleran
Te empujan, te animan
Te cantan, te llevan
Rompiendo gargantas de jerezanas maneras
Hasta quemar la cartera

Vaya puta escandalera...

Mi Xerez

Tribute to the fans by Los Killoque and Jose Monje.

Desde niño se pone la camiseta
En el pecho va su escudo y su bandera
Por las calles de Jerez va caminando
Hasta Chapín para cumplir una promesa
Orgulloso de sentirse xerecista
Con la cabeza bien alta
Como su padre le enseñó
Desde el cielo sabe que el está mirando
Dando fuerzas y apoyando
A su equipo campeón

Mi Xerez, ole, con ole, y ole
Ole, con ole, y ole
Mi Xerez Club Deportivo

La ciudad y la afición está orgullosa
Siempre contigo en la victoria y en la derrota
Animando hasta romperse la garganta
Todos unidos alcanzaremos la gloria
Xerecista hasta el día que me muera
En segunda o en primera
Aquí siempre estaré yo
Más que un equipo mi xerez es un sentimiento
Lo digo como lo siento
Me sale del corazón

Mi Xerez, ole, con ole, y ole
Ole, con ole, y ole
Mi Xerez Club Deportivo

== Stadium ==
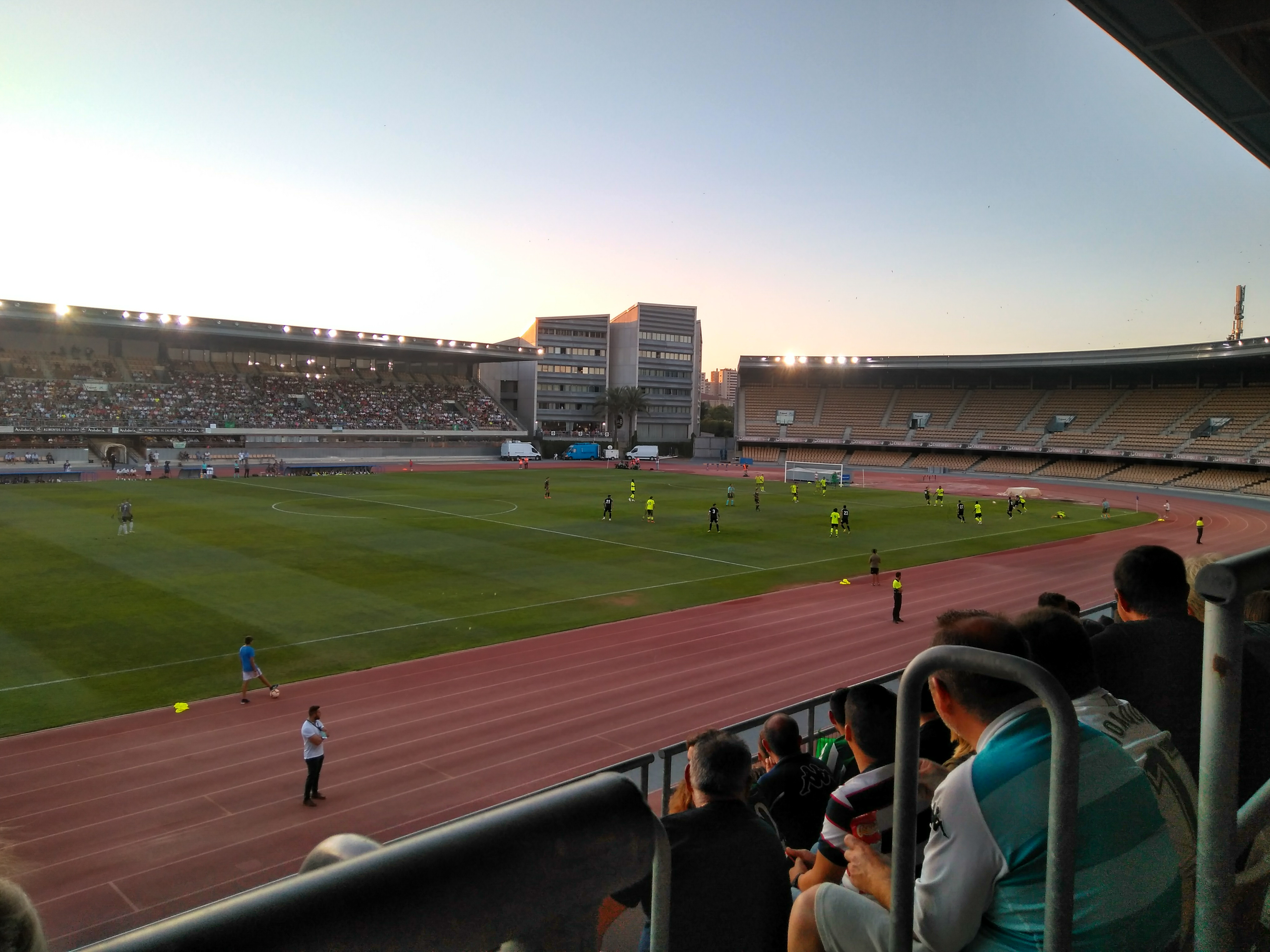
Estadio Municipal de Chapín.

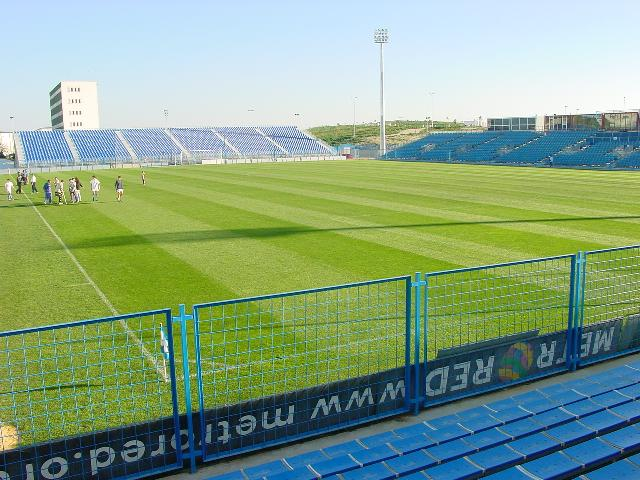
Estadio de la Juventud.

Xerez Club Deportivo played its first matches in the old Estadio Domecq, which it shared with Jerez Industrial CF. In 1988, the club moved to the newly built Estadio Municipal de Chapín, which was inaugurated with a match against Real Madrid.

From the 2013–14 season, and as a consequence of the application of the Regulatory Ordinance for Carrying out Activities in Municipal Sports Facilities, the club encountered difficulties in using the city's municipal facilities. This situation forced the team to live a period of sporting exile, training and competing in various stadiums in the province. During that period, Xerez played matches in Jerez fields such as La Juventud, La Canaleja, La Granja, El Torno and Picadueñas, among others.

The 2017–18 season was especially unstable, with the club acting as home team in up to seven different stadiums: Chapín, La Juventud, El Palmar (Sanlúcar de Barrameda), Antonio Fernández Marchán (Guadalcacín), Andrés Chacón (La Barca de la Florida), Municipal Sánchez Portella (Torrecera) and Municipal de El Torno (El Torno).

In 2021, Xerez returned permanently to the Estadio Municipal de Chapín, where it currently plays thanks to the notable growth of its social mass and the institutional strengthening of the club.

=== Chapín ===
From 1988 to 2014, Xerez played its home games at the Estadio Municipal de Chapín. The stadium was inaugurated in 1988, with a capacity for 20,523 spectators. Its dimensions are 105x68 meters.

One of the stands with the most public attendance was Preferencia. The Tribuna was frequented by well-known people in Jerez. The presidential box, VIP boxes, and broadcasting booths are also located there. The area with the least attendance was Fondo Norte. The fourth stand is Fondo Sur, which was not numbered at the request of the fans, as it was this stand that had the most attendance and atmosphere. This multipurpose stadium is often criticized for the difficulty of vision for spectators due to the separation distance between the stands and the grass, because of the athletics tracks.

After several years playing in different stadiums in the province due to municipal restrictions, Xerez Club Deportivo returned permanently to the Estadio Municipal de Chapín in 2021.

=== Other stadiums ===
Until 1988, the team played at Estadio Domecq. During the 2001–02 season, while Chapín was being remodeled for the 2002 FEI World Equestrian Games, Xerez played at "Estadio El Palmar" in Sanlúcar de Barrameda or "Bahía Sur" in San Fernando. Finally, it returned to Jerez to play first at the remodeled Estadio de la Juventud and finally at Chapín.

== Uniform ==
In its early years, Xerez wore a blue shirt and white shorts. Blue, the main color since its foundation, reflects the link with the city of Jerez de la Frontera. Since the 2022–23 season, Xerez wears kits from the German brand Adidas.

- Home: Blue shirt with crew neck, white sleeves and white details on the sides. Shoulders with the three Adidas stripes in blue.
- Away: Black shirt with a white diagonal sash crossing the chest from left to right, gold crew neck.
- Third: Orange shirt with watermark diagonal line pattern, black shoulders and V-neck.
- Goalkeeper: Long-sleeved shirt in fluorescent yellow.

=== Evolution ===
1947	2010–11	2012–13	2018–19	2022–23	2023–24	2024–25	2025-26

== Club data ==
- Address: C/ Laguna de Gallocanta, 20. 11406
- Colors: Blue and white
- Kit manufacturer: Adidas

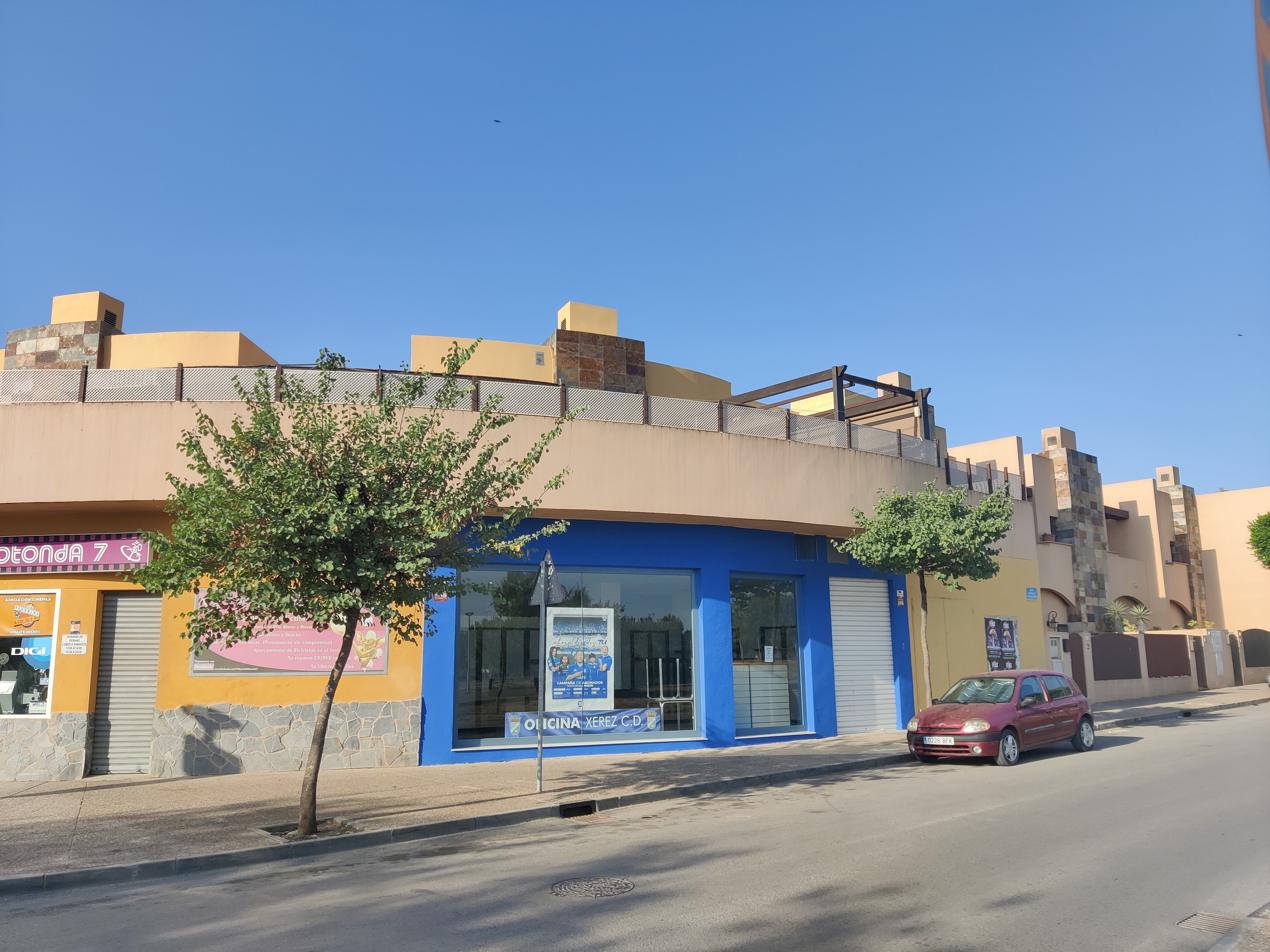
Shop and club headquarters.

=== Sports Data ===
Updated to 2025–26 Season.

- Seasons in 1st: 1
- Seasons in 2nd: 25.
- Seasons in 1st RFEF: 0
- Seasons in 2nd B / 2nd RFEF: 19
- Seasons in 3rd / 3rd RFEF: 29
- Seasons in Regional Preferente: 4
- Best position in league: 20th (La Liga, 09-10 season)
- Worst position in league: 22nd (Segunda División, 12-13 season)
- Historical League classification position : 58.
- Best result in 1st: 3-0 (Real Valladolid, 09/10)
- Biggest loss in 1st: 5-0 (Real Madrid, 09/10)
- Biggest loss in 2nd: 7-0 (Real Jaén, 51/52)
- Top scorer: Pepe Agar, 90 goals (47/48 to 53/54)
- Most matches played: Jesús Mendoza, 432 matches (1999/2000 to 2012/13); Vicente Moreno, 412 matches (00/01 to 10/11); José Ravelo, 348.

==== Historical matches in La Liga ====
Season	Round	Home	Score	Away	Stadium	Notes
2009/10	1st	Mallorca	2-0	Xerez	Ono Estadi	Debut of Xerez in La Liga
2009/10	7th	Xerez	2-1	Villarreal	Chapín	First victory of Xerez in La Liga
2009/10	15th	Xerez	0-2	Barcelona	Chapín	First official visit of Barcelona to Xerez.
2009/10	22nd	Xerez	0-3	Real Madrid	Chapín	First official visit of Real Madrid to Xerez.
2009/10	25th	Málaga	2-4	Xerez	La Rosaleda	First away victory of Xerez in La Liga.
2009/10	29th	Xerez	3-0	Real Valladolid	Chapín	Best result of Xerez in La Liga.
2009/10	32nd	Atlético Madrid	1-2	Xerez	Vicente Calderón	Victory against one of the greats of La Liga.
2009/10	38th	Osasuna	1-1	Xerez	Reyno de Navarra	Relegation to Segunda División

== Presidents ==
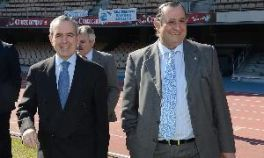
Antonio Millán (left) and Joaquín Bilbao (right), former presidents.

- 24/09/1947 to 28/06/1948: Sixto de la Calle Jiménez
- 29/06/1948 to 13/07/1949: Luis Soto Domecq
- 14/07/1949 to 01/03/1951: Antonio Rueda Muñiz
- 02/03/1951 to 15/05/1952: Sixto de la Calle Jiménez
- 16/05/1952 to 25/05/1954: Alberto Duran Tejera
- 26/05/1954 to 01/03/1956: Rafael Cáliz Garrido
- 02/03/1956 to 08/06/1959: José Benítez López
- 09/06/1959 to 23/06/1959: Francisco Paz Genero
- 24/06/1959 to 02/06/1960: Jesús Grandes Pérez
- 03/06/1960 to 20/08/1961: Manuel Santolalla Romero-Valdespino
- 21/08/1961 to 26/07/1963: Pablo Porro Guerrero
- 27/07/1963 to 17/02/1964: Francisco Paz Genero
- 18/02/1964 to 31/05/1966: Pablo Porro Guerrero
- 01/06/1966 to 29/06/1966: Rafael Cáliz Garrido
- 30/06/1966 to 21/07/1967: Heriberto Solinís Solinís
- 22/07/1967 to 10/09/1968: Manuel Robles Cordero
- 11/09/1968 to 21/11/1971: Andrés Reyes Zambrano
- 22/11/1971 to 15/07/1972: José García Núñez
- 1980 - 1984: Manuel Riquelme Ruiz
- 29/04/1989 to 28/09/1992: Heliodoro Huarte Gorría
- 29/04/1992 to 15/05/1997: Pedro Pacheco Herrera
- 15/05/1997 to 30/04/2002: Luis Oliver Albesa
- 30/04/2002 to 21/06/2004: José María Gil Silgado
- 22/06/2004 to 22/12/2008: Joaquín Morales Domínguez
- 22/12/2008 to 19/03/2009: Joaquín Bilbao Nadal
- 19/03/2009 to 03/12/2009: Carlos de Osma
- 15/01/2010 to 03/06/2010: Federico Souza
- 18/01/2011 to 13/01/2012: Antonio Millán Garrido
- 13/01/2012 to 15/02/2012: Jesús Gómez Martos
- 16/02/2012 to 01/07/2013: Rafael Mateos
- 04/07/2013 to 06/03/2024: Ricardo García Sánchez
- 06/03/2024 to Present: Juan Luis "Titín" Gil Zarzana

== Seasons ==
=== Season to season ===
Season	Tier	Division	Place	Copa del Rey
1947–48	4	1ª Reg.	2nd	
1948–49	4	1ª Reg.	1st	
1949–50	3	3ª	7th	
1950–51	3	3ª	6th	
1951–52	3	3ª	10th	
1952–53	3	3ª	1st	
1953–54	2	2ª	11th	
1954–55	2	2ª	6th	
1955–56	2	2ª	12th	
1956–57	2	2ª	10th	
1957–58	2	2ª	16th	
1958–59	3	3ª	2nd	
1959–60	3	3ª	1st	
1960–61	3	3ª	2nd	
1961–62	3	3ª	2nd	
1962–63	3	3ª	12th	
1963–64	3	3ª	2nd	
1964–65	3	3ª	1st	
1965–66	3	3ª	3rd	
1966–67	3	3ª	1st	

Season	Tier	Division	Place	Copa del Rey
1967–68	2	2ª	12th	Round of 32
1968–69	3	3ª	7th	
1969–70	3	3ª	2nd	1st round
1970–71	3	3ª	1st	3rd round
1971–72	2	2ª	19th	4th round
1972–73	3	3ª	6th	2nd round
1973–74	3	3ª	16th	1st round
1974–75	3	3ª	5th	3rd round
1975–76	3	3ª	7th	2nd round
1976–77	3	3ª	8th	2nd round
1977–78	3	2ª B	7th	2nd round
1978–79	3	2ª B	7th	2nd round
1979–80	3	2ª B	13th	1st round
1980–81	3	2ª B	8th	
1981–82	3	2ª B	1st	1st round
1982–83	2	2ª	19th	3rd round
1983–84	3	2ª B	6th	Round of 16
1984–85	3	2ª B	6th	1st round
1985–86	3	2ª B	1st	3rd round
1986–87	2	2ª	18th	1st round

Season	Tier	Division	Place	Copa del Rey
1987–88	2	2ª	9th	3rd round
1988–89	2	2ª	12th	4th round
1989–90	2	2ª	10th	2nd round
1990–91	2	2ª	20th	3rd round
1991–92	3	2ª B	8th	1st round
1992–93	3	2ª B	2nd	4th round
1993–94	3	2ª B	5th	2nd round
1994–95	3	2ª B	9th	1st round
1995–96	3	2ª B	11th	
1996–97	3	2ª B	2nd	
1997–98	2	2ª	21st	3rd round
1998–99	3	2ª B	11th	1st round
1999–2000	3	2ª B	3rd	
2000–01	3	2ª B	3rd	Round of 32
2001–02	2	2ª	4th	3rd round
2002–03	2	2ª	6th	Round of 16
2003–04	2	2ª	9th	3rd round
2004–05	2	2ª	8th	2nd round
2005–06	2	2ª	7th	5th round
2006–07	2	2ª	9th	Round of 32

Season	Tier	Division	Place	Copa del Rey
2007–08	2	2ª	15th	Round of 32
2008–09	2	2ª	1st	2nd round
2009–10	1	1ª	20th	Round of 32
2010–11	2	2ª	8th	Round of 32
2011–12	2	2ª	14th	Second round
2012–13	2	2ª	22nd	Second round
2013–14	4	3ª	19th	Third round
2014–15	5	1ª And.	10th	
2015–16	5	1ª And.	6th	
2016–17	5	Div. Hon.	3rd	
2017–18	4	3ª	16th	
2018–19	4	3ª	10th	
2019–20	4	3ª	17th	
2020–21	4	3ª	2nd / 4th	
2021–22	5	3ª RFEF	3rd	
2022–23	5	3ª Fed.	7th	
2023–24	5	3ª Fed.	1st	
2024–25	4	2ª Fed.	7th	First round
2025–26	4	2ª Fed.	4th	
2026–27	4	2ª Fed.		TBD

- 1 season in La Liga
- 25 seasons in Segunda División
- 3 seasons in Segunda Federación
- 17 seasons in Segunda División B
- 26 seasons in Tercera División (21 on 3rd tier)
- 3 seasons in Tercera Federación/Tercera División RFEF

== Honours ==
=== Official tournaments ===
(Spain) National Competition (9 titles)	Titles	Runners-up
Segunda División	2008–09	
Segunda División B / Segunda RFEF	1981–82, 1985–86 (2)	
Tercera División / Tercera RFEF	1952–53, 1959–60, 1964–65, 1966–67, 1970–71, 2023–24 (6)	

(Andalusia) Regional Competition (4 titles)	Titles	Runners-up
Regional Preferente	1947–48, 1948–49 (2)	
Copa RFEF Regional	2020–21	
Copa Federación Andaluza	1955–56	1954–55
Copa RFAF		2021–22

=== Friendly tournaments ===
- Trofeo de la Vendimia (9): 1955, 1957, 1958, 1963, 1980, 1981, 1984, 2006, 2009
- Trofeo Ciudad del Puerto (12): 1983, 1984, 1988, 1989, 1990, 1996, 2001, 2006, 2019, 2022, 2024, 2025
- Trofeo Ciudad de Mérida: 2007
- Trofeo Los Cármenes: 2009
- Trofeo de la Sal: 2011
- Trofeo Rafa Verdú (2): 2020, 2021
- Trofeo Feria de la Vendimia (2): 2020, 2024

== Coaches ==
Recent coaches in the 21st century:

Name	Years
(Spain) Pedro Buenaventura	1998
(Spain) José Enrique Díaz	1998
(Spain) Campillo	1999
(Spain) Nene Montero	1999–2000
(Spain) Gail	2000
(Spain) Máximo Hernández	2001
(Germany) Bernd Schuster	2001–2003
(Spain) Manolo Ruiz (interim)	2003
(Spain) Carlos Orúe	2003
(Spain) Esteban Vigo	2003–2004
(Spain) Manolo Ruiz (interim)	2004
(Spain) Paco Chaparro	2004–2005
(Spain) Enrique Martín	2005
(Spain) Lucas Alcaraz	2005–2006
(Spain) Pepe Murcia	2006–2007
(Spain) Miguel Ángel Rondán	2007
(Spain) Antonio Méndez (interim)	2007
(Spain) Juan Martínez Casuco	2007–2008
(Spain) Esteban Vigo	2008–2009
(Spain) José Ángel Ziganda	2009–2010
(Spain) Antonio Poyatos (interim)	2010
(Argentina) Néstor Gorosito	2010
(Spain) Javi López	2010–2011
(Spain) Juan Merino	2011
(Spain) Vicente Moreno	2011–2012
(Spain) Esteban Vigo	2012
(Spain) Carlos Ríos	2013
(Spain) David Vidal	2013
(Spain) Paco Peña	2013
(Spain) Antonio Manuel Racero 'Puma'	2013
(Spain) Francisco Higuera	2013–2014
(Spain) Paco Peña	2014
(Spain) Jesús Mendoza	2014–2015
(Spain) Vicente Vargas	2015–2016
(Argentina) Carlos Fontana	2016
(Spain) Vicente Vargas	2016–2018
(Spain) Juan Pedro Ramos	2018
(Spain) Nene Montero	2018–2019
(Spain) Antonio Calle	2019
(Spain) Juan Carlos Gómez Díaz	2019–2020
(Spain) Joaquín Poveda	2020–2021
(Spain) Esteban Vigo	2021
(Spain) Emilio Fajardo	2021–2022
(Spain) Paco Peña	2022
(Spain) Juan Carlos Gómez Díaz	2022–2023
(Spain) Juan Pedro Ramos	2023
(Spain) Checa	2023–2025
(Spain) Diego Galiano	2025–2026
(Spain) Xavi Molist	2026–Present

== Youth System ==
At the end of the 2014/15 season and in order to reduce expenses due to the bad economic situation of the club, Xerez abolished most of its youth system, keeping only a Youth team. Among the teams that disappeared was Xerez B, which had been relegated that same season. At the same time, an affiliation agreement was announced with Xerez Balompié.

Since the 2017/18 season, several teams belonging to the association Afición Xerecista CD act as the youth academy of Xerez Club Deportivo. For the 2019/20 season, the intention to increase the number of academy teams with four new teams: school (baby), benjamin, alevín and infantile, as well as a senior women's team and a futsal section, was announced.

In the 2023/24 season, Xerez Club Deportivo communicated that the entity would manage its own grassroots football teams, approving the new strategic plan called "Cantera Xerez CD". Similarly, the team will maintain the affiliation agreement with Afición Xerez CD for greater enrichment, with the idea of re-enhancing Jerez grassroots football.

== Rivalries ==
- (Spain) Xerez Deportivo FC (breakaway of Xerez CD)
- (Spain) Cádiz CF
- (Spain) Xerez Deportivo Fútbol Club
- (Spain) Córdoba CF
- (Spain) Recreativo de Huelva
- (Spain) Málaga CF
- (Spain) Jerez Industrial (formerly)

== Players ==
=== Current squad ===
As of 10 February 2026

Note: Flags indicate national team as defined under FIFA eligibility rules; some limited exceptions apply. Players may hold more than one non-FIFA nationality.

No.	Pos.	Nation	Player
1	GK	ESP	Ángel de la Calzada
3	DF	ESP	Felipe Chacartegui
4	MF	ESP	Adri Rodríguez
5	DF	ESP	Josete Malagón
6	FW	ESP	Franco Jr.
7	FW	ESP	Zelu
8	MF	ESP	Ismael Gutiérrez
9	FW	ESP	Nané García
10	MF	MAR	Charaf Taoualy
11	FW	ESP	Mati Castillo
13	GK	ESP	Marcos Alconchel

No.	Pos.	Nation	Player
14	MF	ESP	Jaime López
15	DF	ESP	Leo Vázquez
16	FW	ESP	Javi Rodríguez
17	FW	ESP	Chuma
18	FW	ESP	Ricky Castro
19	DF	ESP	Moisés Rodríguez
20	MF	ESP	Jaime Fuentes
21	MF	ESP	Zeki Díaz
22	DF	ESP	Guille Campos
23	FW	SEN	Moussa Sissokho
24	MF	NGR	Bless (on loan from Ceuta)

== Trofeo de la Vendimia ==
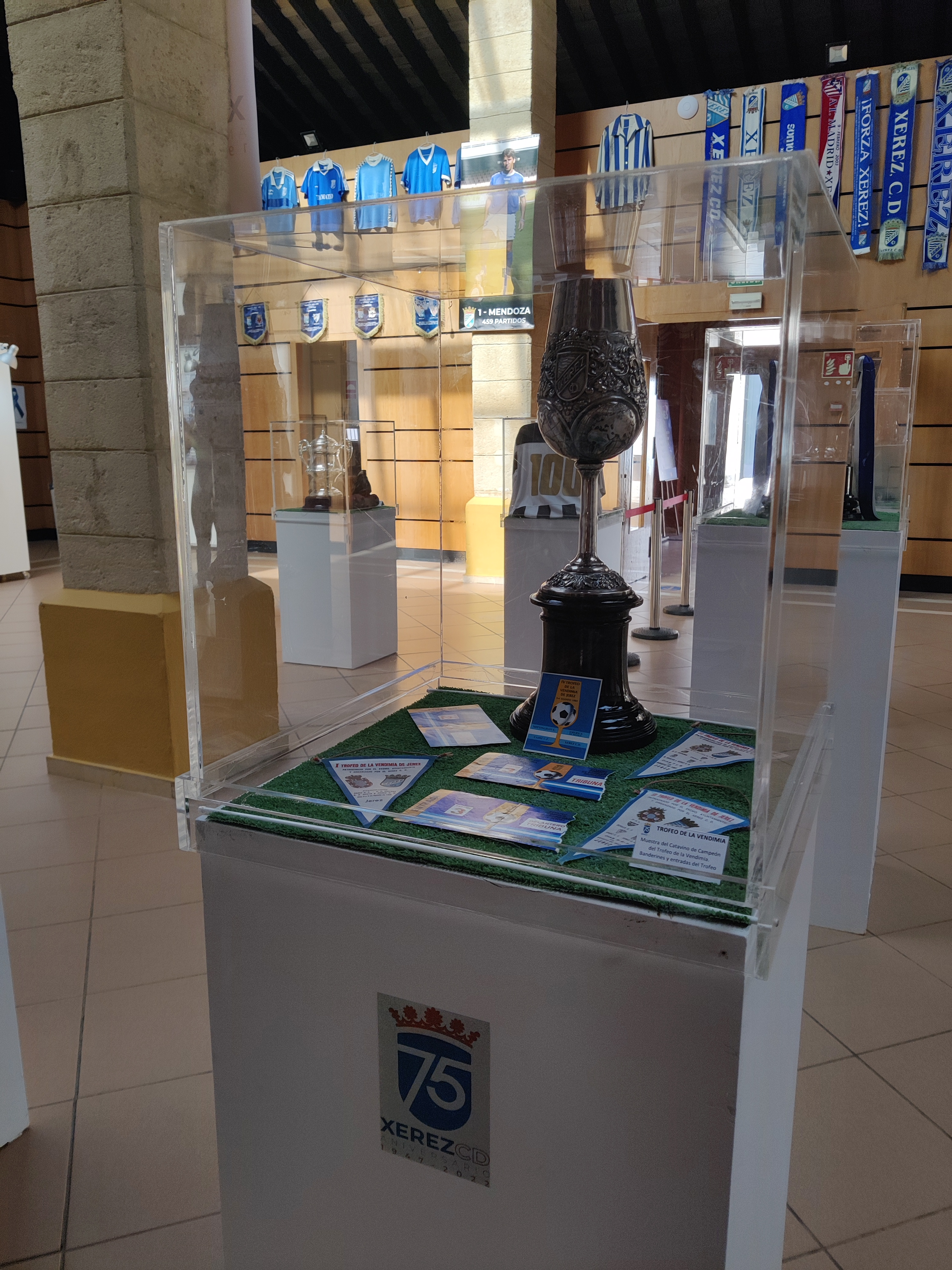
Trophy

This trophy was played for the first time on 7 September 1952, a match played in the old Estadio Domecq against FC Barcelona. Since then, many high-level teams have disputed this trophy, which was lost in subsequent seasons. After the Trofeo Teresa Herrera in A Coruña, it is the oldest held in the entire Spanish geography.

From 2014, Xerez DFC took over the rights to it by registering its patent. In 2015 Xerez CD began celebrating the "Trofeo Rafa Verdú" in recognition of its Honorary President and later in 2020 Xerez C.D presented the Trofeo Feria de la Vendimia.
