= 2015–16 Segunda División =

85th season of the second-tier football league in Spain

Segunda División
- Season: 2015–16
- Champions: Alavés
- Promoted: Alavés; Leganés; Osasuna
- Relegated: Ponferradina; Llagostera; Albacete; Bilbao Athletic
- Matches: 429
- Goals: 960 (2.24 per match)
- Top goalscorer: Sergio León (22 goals)
- Best goalkeeper: Isaac Becerra
- Biggest home win: Alcorcón 6–1 Llagostera (24 October 2015)
- Biggest away win: Oviedo 0–5 Osasuna (4 June 2016)
- Highest scoring: Numancia 6–3 Tenerife (23 August 2015)
- Highest attendance: 23,765; Zaragoza 0–1 Gimnàstic (22 May 2016)
- Lowest attendance: 705; Llagostera 0–0 Mirandés (20 December 2015)
- Average attendance: 7,528

The 2015–16 Segunda División season, also known as Liga Adelante for sponsorship reasons, was the 85th since its establishment.

== Teams ==
=== Promotion and relegation (pre-season) ===
A total of 22 teams contested the league, including 15 sides from the 2014–15 season, four promoted from the 2014–15 Segunda División B and three relegated from the 2014–15 La Liga.

Relegated from 2014–15 La Liga

- Elche (administrative relegation)
- Almería
- Córdoba

Promoted from 2014–15 Segunda División B

- Oviedo
- Gimnàstic
- Bilbao Athletic
- Huesca

=== Stadia and locations ===
Location of teams in 2015–16 Segunda División
Location of teams in 2015–16 Segunda División (Canary Islands)

Team	Location	Stadium	Capacity
Alavés	Vitoria-Gasteiz	Mendizorrotza	19,840
Albacete	Albacete	Carlos Belmonte	17,300
Alcorcón	Alcorcón	Santo Domingo	6,000
Almería	Almería	Juegos Mediterráneos	21,350
Bilbao Athletic	Bilbao	San Mamés	53,289
Córdoba	Córdoba	El Arcángel	21,822
Elche	Elche	Martínez Valero	36,017
Gimnàstic	Tarragona	Nou Estadi	14,591
Girona	Girona	Montilivi	9,286
Huesca	Huesca	El Alcoraz	5,500
Leganés	Leganés	Butarque	8,138
Llagostera	Llagostera	Palamós Costa Brava	5,824
Lugo	Lugo	Anxo Carro	7,840
Mallorca	Palma	Iberostar	23,142
Mirandés	Miranda de Ebro	Anduva	6,900
Numancia	Soria	Los Pajaritos	9,025
Osasuna	Pamplona	El Sadar	18,761
Oviedo	Oviedo	Carlos Tartiere	30,500
Ponferradina	Ponferrada	El Toralín	8,800
Tenerife	Santa Cruz de Tenerife	Heliodoro Rodríguez López	23,000
Valladolid	Valladolid	José Zorrilla	26,512
Zaragoza	Zaragoza	La Romareda	34,596

=== Personnel and sponsorship ===
Team	Chairman	Head coach	Captain	Kit manufacturer	Main shirt sponsor
Alavés	(Spain) Alfonso Fernández de Trocóniz	(Spain) José Bordalás	(Spain) Manu García	Hummel	Euskaltel
Albacete	(Spain) José Miguel Garrido	(Spain) César Ferrando	(Spain) Miguel Núñez	Hummel	
Alcorcón	(Spain) Ignacio Legido	(Spain) Juan Ramón Muñiz	(Spain) Rubén Sanz	Erreà	Ecotisa
Almería	(Spain) Alfonso García Gabarrón	(Spain) Fernando Soriano	(Argentina) Sebastián Dubarbier	Nike	Urcisol
Bilbao Athletic	(Spain) Josu Urrutia	(Spain) José Ángel Ziganda	(Spain) Óscar Gil	Nike	
Córdoba	(Spain) Carlos González	(Spain) José Luis Oltra	(Spain) Xisco	Acerbis	RD Impagos
Elche	(Spain) Junta Gestora	(Spain) Rubén Baraja	(Spain) Lolo	Kelme	Gioseppo
Gimnàstic	(Spain) Josep María Andreu	(Spain) Vicente Moreno	(Spain) Xisco Campos	Hummel	Sorigué
Girona	(Spain) Delfí Geli	(Spain) Pablo Machín	(Spain) Richy	Kappa	City Lift
Huesca	(Spain) Fernando Losfablos	(Spain) Juan Antonio Anquela	(Spain) Juanjo Camacho	Bemiser	Supermercados Simply
Leganés	(Spain) María Victoria Pavón	(Spain) Asier Garitano	(Argentina) Martín Mantovani	Joma	Mercedes-Benz Citycar Sur
Llagostera	(Spain) Isabel Tarragó	(Spain) Oriol Alsina	(Spain) René	Hummel	
Lugo	(Spain) Tino Saqués	(Spain) José Antonio Durán	(Spain) Manu	Hummel	Estrella Galicia
Mallorca	(United States) Robert Sarver	(Spain) Fernando Vázquez	(Spain) Javi Ros	Macron	Syntelia
Mirandés	(Spain) Alfredo de Miguel	(Spain) Carlos Terrazas	(Spain) Álvaro Corral	Adidas	Vivir Miranda
Numancia	(Spain) Francisco Rubio	(Spain) Jagoba Arrasate	(Spain) Javier del Pino	Erreà	Soria Natural
Osasuna	(Spain) Luis Sabalza	(Spain) Enrique Martín	(Spain) Miguel Flaño	Adidas	Lacturale
Oviedo	(Spain) Jorge Menéndez	(Spain) David Generelo	(Spain) Diego Cervero	Hummel	GAM
Ponferradina	(Spain) José Fernández Nieto	(Spain) Rubén Vega	(Spain) Alan Baró	Adidas	Bio3
Tenerife	(Spain) Miguel Concepción	(Spain) José Luis Martí	(Spain) Suso	Hummel	Tenerife
Valladolid	(Spain) Carlos Suárez	(Spain) Alberto López	(Spain) Álvaro Rubio	Hummel	Cuatro Rayas
Zaragoza	(Spain) Christian Lapetra	(Spain) Lluís Carreras	(Spain) Jesús Vallejo	Mercury	Caravan Fragancias

=== Managerial changes ===
Team	Outgoing manager	Manner of departure	Date of vacancy	Position in table	Replaced by	Date of appointment
Alcorcón	(Spain) José Bordalás	End of contract	30 June 2015	Pre-season	(Spain) Juan Muñiz	9 June 2015
Lugo	(Spain) Quique Setién	End of contract	30 June 2015	Pre-season	(Spain) Luis Milla	18 June 2015
Córdoba	(Spain) José Antonio Romero	End of contract	10 June 2015	Pre-season	(Spain) José Luis Oltra	10 June 2015
Alavés	(Spain) Alberto López	End of contract	11 June 2015	Pre-season	(Spain) José Bordalás	11 June 2015
Numancia	(Spain) Juan Antonio Anquela	End of contract	12 June 2015	Pre-season	(Spain) Jagoba Arrasate	12 June 2015
Elche	(Spain) Fran Escribá	Resigned	26 June 2015	Pre-season	(Spain) Rubén Baraja	12 July 2015
Valladolid	(Spain) Rubi	Sacked	6 July 2015	Pre-season	(Spain) Gaizka Garitano	6 July 2015
Almería	(Spain) Sergi Barjuan	Sacked	3 October 2015	16th	(Spain) Joan Carrillo	19 October 2015
Valladolid	(Spain) Gaizka Garitano	Sacked	21 October 2015	20th	(Spain) Miguel Ángel Portugal	21 October 2015
Tenerife	(Spain) Raül Agné	Sacked	3 November 2015	19th	(Spain) José Luis Martí	4 November 2015
Huesca	(Spain) Luis Tevenet	Sacked	29 November 2015	18th	(Spain) Juan Antonio Anquela	30 November 2015
Mallorca	(Spain) Albert Ferrer	Sacked	30 November 2015	20th	(Spain) Pepe Gálvez	2 December 2015
Zaragoza	(Serbia) Ranko Popović	Sacked	20 December 2015	8th	(Spain) Lluís Carreras	27 December 2015
Almería	(Spain) Joan Carrillo	Sacked	20 December 2015	22nd	(Argentina) Néstor Gorosito	23 December 2015
Mallorca	(Spain) Pepe Gálvez	Sacked	18 January 2016	19th	(Spain) Fernando Vázquez	18 January 2016
Ponferradina	(Spain) José Manuel Díaz	Sacked	31 January 2016	17th	(Spain) Fabri	17 February 2016
Lugo	(Spain) Luis Milla	Resigned	24 February 2016	12th	(Spain) José Antonio Durán	25 February 2016
Albacete	(Spain) Luis César Sampedro	Sacked	12 March 2016	20th	(Spain) César Ferrando	13 March 2016
Oviedo	(Argentina) Sergio Egea	Resigned	14 March 2016	3rd	(Spain) David Generelo	14 March 2016
Valladolid	(Spain) Miguel Ángel Portugal	Sacked	24 April 2016	15th	(Spain) Alberto López	26 April 2016
Ponferradina	(Spain) Fabri	Sacked	26 April 2016	19th	(Spain) Rubén Vega	27 April 2016
Almería	(Argentina) Néstor Gorosito	Sacked	16 May 2016	19th	(Spain) Fernando Soriano	17 May 2016

== League table ==
Pos	Team	Pld	W	D	L	GF	GA	GD	Pts	Promotion, qualification or relegation
1	Alavés (C, P)	42	21	12	9	49	35	+14	75	Promotion to La Liga
2	Leganés (P)	42	20	14	8	59	34	+25	74	Promotion to La Liga
3	Gimnàstic	42	18	17	7	57	41	+16	71	Qualification to promotion play-offs
4	Girona	42	17	15	10	46	28	+18	66	Qualification to promotion play-offs
5	Córdoba	42	19	8	15	59	52	+7	65	Qualification to promotion play-offs
6	Osasuna (O, P)	42	17	13	12	47	40	+7	64 (Note: Osasuna ahead of Alcorcón and Zaragoza on head-to-head record; Osasuna 7 points, Alcorcón 6 points, Zaragoza 4 points)	Qualification to promotion play-offs
7	Alcorcón	42	18	10	14	48	44	+4	64	
8	Zaragoza	42	17	13	12	50	44	+6	64	
9	Oviedo	42	16	11	15	52	51	+1	59	
10	Numancia	42	13	18	11	57	51	+6	57 (Note: Numancia ahead of Elche on overall goal difference; Numancia +6, Elche -6)	
11	Elche	42	13	18	11	40	46	−6	57	
12	Huesca	42	14	13	15	48	49	−1	55 (Note: Huesca ahead of Tenerife on goals scored; Huesca 48, Tenerife 45)	
13	Tenerife	42	13	16	13	45	46	−1	55	
14	Lugo	42	13	15	14	44	50	−6	54	
15	Mirandés	42	13	13	16	55	56	−1	52	
16	Valladolid	42	12	15	15	47	52	−5	51	
17	Mallorca	42	12	13	17	39	45	−6	49	
18	Almería	42	10	18	14	44	51	−7	48	
19	Ponferradina (R)	42	12	11	19	39	54	−15	47	Relegation to Segunda División B
20	Llagostera (R)	42	12	8	22	44	54	−10	44	Relegation to Segunda División B
21	Albacete (R)	42	10	9	23	39	61	−22	39	Relegation to Segunda División B
22	Bilbao Athletic (R)	42	8	8	26	35	59	−24	32	Relegation to Segunda División B

Source: LFP
Rules for classification: 1) points; 2) head-to-head points; 3) head-to-head goal difference; 4) goal difference; 5) number of goals scored
(C) Champions; (O) Play-off winners; (P) Promoted; (R) Relegated

=== Positions by round ===
Team ╲ Round	1	2	3	4	5	6	7	8	9	10	11	12	13	14	15	16	17	18	19	20	21	22	23	24	25	26	27	28	29	30	31	32	33	34	35	36	37	38	39	40	41	42
Alavés	5	2	7	10	7	7	7	4	8	5	5	11	5	3	3	2	2	1	1	1	1	1	1	1	1	1	2	2	2	2	2	1	2	2	2	2	2	2	1	1	1	1
Leganés	16	7	10	16	17	15	11	12	13	13	15	15	12	13	11	10	6	7	8	6	5	4	2	2	2	2	1	1	1	1	1	2	1	1	1	1	1	1	2	2	2	2
Gimnàstic	10	4	2	6	3	3	5	9	5	6	9	4	9	6	4	5	7	5	6	7	7	6	6	7	4	5	4	5	7	3	3	3	4	4	4	3	3	3	3	3	3	3
Girona	8	11	15	17	10	12	17	17	16	18	14	16	18	14	15	16	18	17	15	17	16	14	13	13	14	14	12	9	12	12	11	11	12	10	8	7	7	8	6	8	6	4
Córdoba	7	13	17	12	8	8	4	2	2	2	1	1	2	2	1	1	1	2	2	2	2	2	3	3	5	4	6	4	5	4	6	5	9	8	9	10	8	10	9	7	5	5
Osasuna	3	3	5	2	1	1	1	1	1	1	2	3	1	1	2	4	5	4	5	5	4	3	5	5	7	8	5	6	4	7	5	7	7	9	6	6	5	6	4	4	7	6
Alcorcón	2	12	4	1	5	5	3	5	9	3	6	9	13	10	6	9	10	6	4	4	6	7	9	9	10	7	8	8	9	8	9	6	6	6	10	9	9	9	8	5	8	7
Zaragoza	14	5	8	14	18	17	13	7	3	4	3	2	4	9	5	3	4	8	9	10	8	12	12	10	9	10	7	7	6	5	7	9	5	5	3	5	4	4	5	6	4	8
Oviedo	12	18	11	5	9	11	12	6	4	8	8	13	8	5	8	7	3	3	3	3	3	5	4	4	3	3	3	3	3	6	4	4	3	3	5	4	6	5	7	9	9	9
Numancia	1	1	1	3	4	4	2	3	6	7	11	7	11	11	12	12	14	15	13	15	14	15	14	14	13	13	15	15	15	15	15	15	15	15	14	13	14	11	14	11	12	10
Elche	19	14	12	7	2	2	6	10	7	9	13	8	10	12	14	13	12	10	11	11	10	8	7	8	8	9	10	11	8	10	10	8	8	7	7	8	10	7	10	10	10	11
Huesca	15	17	19	20	21	18	19	13	14	15	12	14	16	18	18	19	17	16	17	18	18	19	18	17	17	17	17	17	16	18	18	18	18	19	17	16	16	16	16	16	15	12
Tenerife	22	22	22	22	19	14	16	16	18	19	19	19	17	15	16	14	13	14	16	14	13	13	15	15	15	15	13	14	14	14	14	13	13	11	12	12	11	13	12	12	11	13
Lugo	11	6	9	4	6	6	8	14	11	12	10	5	6	8	9	11	8	9	10	8	9	10	10	12	12	12	14	12	10	11	8	10	11	13	11	11	13	14	11	13	13	14
Mirandés	13	19	20	13	13	19	15	8	10	11	7	10	3	7	10	8	11	11	7	9	11	9	8	6	6	6	9	10	13	13	12	14	10	12	13	14	12	12	13	14	14	15
Valladolid	18	9	16	11	11	13	14	18	19	16	17	17	14	16	17	17	15	13	14	13	12	11	11	11	11	11	11	13	11	9	13	12	14	14	15	15	15	15	15	15	16	16
Mallorca	21	15	18	18	20	22	22	19	20	17	18	18	19	19	20	18	19	19	19	19	19	18	16	18	18	18	18	18	19	17	16	16	16	16	18	17	17	17	17	17	19	17
Almería	6	10	6	9	16	20	20	20	21	22	22	21	22	22	22	21	22	22	20	20	20	20	20	20	20	20	20	19	18	19	19	19	19	18	16	18	18	19	18	19	17	18
Ponferradina	4	8	3	8	12	9	9	11	12	10	4	6	7	4	7	6	9	12	12	12	15	16	17	16	16	16	16	16	17	16	17	17	17	17	19	19	19	18	19	18	18	19
Llagostera	20	21	14	21	22	21	18	21	15	20	20	22	20	21	19	20	20	20	21	21	21	21	21	22	21	21	22	21	21	21	21	21	21	20	20	20	20	20	20	20	20	20
Albacete	9	16	21	15	15	10	10	15	17	14	16	12	15	17	13	15	16	18	18	16	17	17	19	19	19	19	19	20	20	20	20	20	20	21	21	21	21	21	21	21	21	21
Bilbao Ath	17	20	13	19	14	16	21	22	22	21	21	20	21	20	21	22	21	21	22	22	22	22	22	21	22	22	21	22	22	22	22	22	22	22	22	22	22	22	22	22	22	22

Notes: The table lists the positions of teams after each week of matches. In order to preserve chronological evolvements, any postponed matches are not included to the round at which they were originally scheduled, but added to the full round they were played immediately afterwards. For example, if a match is scheduled for matchday 13, but then postponed and played between days 16 and 17, it will be added to the standings for day 17.

== Results ==
Home \ Away	ALV	ALB	ADA	ALM	BAT	CÓR	ELC	GTA	GIR	HUE	LEG	LAG	LUG	MLL	MIR	NUM	OSA	ROV	PNF	TEN	VLD	ZAR
Alavés	—	1–1	1–1	1–1	3–0	3–2	0–0	1–3	1–0	1–0	0–0	1–0	0–0	1–0	2–3	2–0	3–0	2–0	2–0	2–2	2–1	0–0
Albacete	0–1	—	0–2	3–0	2–1	2–0	1–0	1–1	0–3	1–1	0–3	1–0	2–0	1–0	1–1	0–2	3–1	2–2	2–2	1–2	0–1	1–3
Alcorcón	0–1	1–0	—	0–0	1–0	3–3	4–1	1–1	1–0	0–1	2–0	6–1	1–1	2–0	1–0	1–1	0–1	1–0	1–0	2–1	0–0	1–0
Almería	0–2	1–0	1–1	—	3–2	0–1	2–3	1–2	1–0	1–2	3–2	2–1	0–2	1–1	2–1	1–1	2–1	3–1	1–1	2–2	1–1	2–1
Bilbao Athletic	2–3	0–1	1–0	0–0	—	1–2	0–1	0–4	0–1	0–0	1–2	2–0	1–1	3–1	1–1	0–0	0–0	2–1	4–2	2–0	0–1	0–1
Córdoba	1–2	2–3	1–3	1–1	1–0	—	3–1	2–0	1–0	1–1	2–3	2–0	1–2	3–1	1–2	3–2	0–1	2–1	1–0	0–0	1–0	0–2
Elche	0–1	1–1	2–0	0–0	2–1	2–1	—	1–0	1–1	1–1	0–0	1–1	2–0	1–1	1–4	0–0	2–1	1–1	1–0	0–0	2–2	2–1
Gimnàstic	1–1	2–2	0–2	2–2	2–1	4–4	1–0	—	1–0	2–0	0–0	2–0	1–2	1–0	3–2	1–0	1–0	0–0	1–1	2–1	1–1	3–1
Girona	1–0	3–0	2–0	1–1	2–1	1–2	0–1	1–1	—	0–0	1–1	2–2	0–1	1–0	2–0	2–3	0–0	1–1	4–0	1–0	1–0	0–0
Huesca	2–3	3–1	1–0	2–1	1–2	0–2	1–3	2–0	0–1	—	1–1	3–1	1–0	1–2	1–2	2–0	0–1	0–1	1–1	1–1	1–1	1–1
Leganés	2–0	3–2	3–0	2–1	1–0	3–1	0–0	1–0	2–2	2–3	—	2–0	0–0	0–0	4–0	2–2	2–0	1–1	3–0	0–1	4–0	1–1
Llagostera	3–0	2–0	4–0	0–0	2–1	1–0	4–1	1–1	0–1	2–0	0–1	—	0–0	3–0	0–0	2–1	0–2	2–0	0–1	0–2	3–1	6–2
Lugo	1–0	2–1	1–2	1–0	2–0	1–2	1–1	0–3	1–1	1–1	1–2	1–0	—	2–1	1–4	2–3	2–0	2–2	3–1	2–0	1–1	0–0
Mallorca	0–0	2–0	1–0	1–0	2–3	0–1	2–1	2–2	1–1	0–1	3–0	1–0	1–1	—	1–1	0–0	1–1	1–0	1–0	1–0	0–1	0–0
Mirandés	0–0	1–1	3–0	1–1	3–0	0–3	1–2	0–1	1–0	1–0	0–1	0–0	1–1	2–2	—	0–2	4–0	1–2	1–0	1–2	4–1	1–1
Numancia	0–1	2–0	1–1	2–0	3–2	1–1	0–0	1–1	1–1	3–2	1–2	1–1	1–0	2–0	2–2	—	1–3	1–0	1–0	6–3	2–2	2–2
Osasuna	3–1	1–0	1–2	0–0	1–1	0–0	0–0	1–1	0–1	2–3	2–1	3–0	4–0	2–1	1–0	3–2	—	0–0	0–0	0–0	1–0	1–1
Oviedo	1–1	3–1	3–2	1–0	0–0	1–0	3–0	2–0	1–2	0–1	0–1	2–1	2–2	1–1	4–1	1–0	0–5	—	3–0	1–0	2–4	1–0
Ponferradina	0–1	2–1	0–0	1–3	1–0	1–3	2–0	2–2	0–1	2–1	1–0	1–0	2–1	0–2	2–2	1–0	3–0	4–2	—	0–1	3–0	1–1
Tenerife	2–0	1–0	1–2	0–0	2–0	1–1	1–1	1–2	1–1	1–1	0–0	3–1	1–0	2–1	3–0	0–0	2–2	0–2	1–1	—	3–1	0–0
Valladolid	1–2	1–0	2–0	1–1	1–0	2–0	1–1	0–0	0–0	0–1	1–1	3–0	1–1	1–3	2–1	2–2	0–1	2–3	0–0	4–1	—	1–2
Zaragoza	1–0	1–0	3–1	3–2	2–0	0–1	2–0	0–1	0–3	3–3	1–0	1–0	3–1	2–1	1–2	2–2	0–1	1–0	2–0	2–0	0–2	—

Source: BDFutbol
Legend: Blue = home team win; Yellow = draw; Red = away team win.

== Promotion play-offs ==
Teams placed between 3rd and 6th position (excluding reserve teams) will take part in the promotion play-offs. The first leg of the semi-finals will be played on 8 June and the second leg on 12 June at home of the best positioned team. The final will also be two-legged, with the first leg on 15 June and the second leg on 19 June, with the best positioned team also playing the second leg at home.

Semifinals
5	Córdoba	2	1	3
4	Girona	1	3	4
6	Osasuna	3	3	6
3	Gimnàstic	1	2	3

Final
4	Girona	1	0	1
6	Osasuna	2	1	3

== Season statistics ==
=== Top goalscorers ===
Rank	Player	Club	Goals
1	(Spain) Sergio León	Elche	22
2	(Romania) Florin Andone	Córdoba	21
3	(Spain) David Rodríguez	Alcorcón	19
4	(Spain) Toché	Oviedo	17
5	(Spain) José Naranjo	Gimnàstic	15
5	(Spain) Quique	Almería	15
5	(Spain) Juan Villar	Valladolid	15
8	(Spain) Nano	Tenerife	14
9	(Spain) Álex Alegría	Numancia	12
9	(Argentina) Pablo Caballero	Lugo	12
9	(Argentina) Alexander Szymanowski	Leganés	12
9	(Spain) Roberto Torres	Osasuna	12

=== Zamora Trophy ===
The Zamora Trophy is awarded by newspaper Marca to the goalkeeper with least goals-to-games ratio. Keepers must play at least 28 games of 60 or more minutes to be eligible for the trophy.

As of 29 May 2016.

Rank	Name	Club	Goals Against	Matches	Average
1	(Spain) Isaac Becerra	Girona	29	41	0.71
2	(Spain) Jon Ander Serantes	Leganés	34	41	0.83
3	(Spain) Fernando Pacheco	Alavés	34	40	0.85
4	(Spain) Javi Jiménez	Elche	36	39	0.92
5	(Serbia) Marko Dmitrović	Alcorcón	34	36	0.94

== Attendances ==
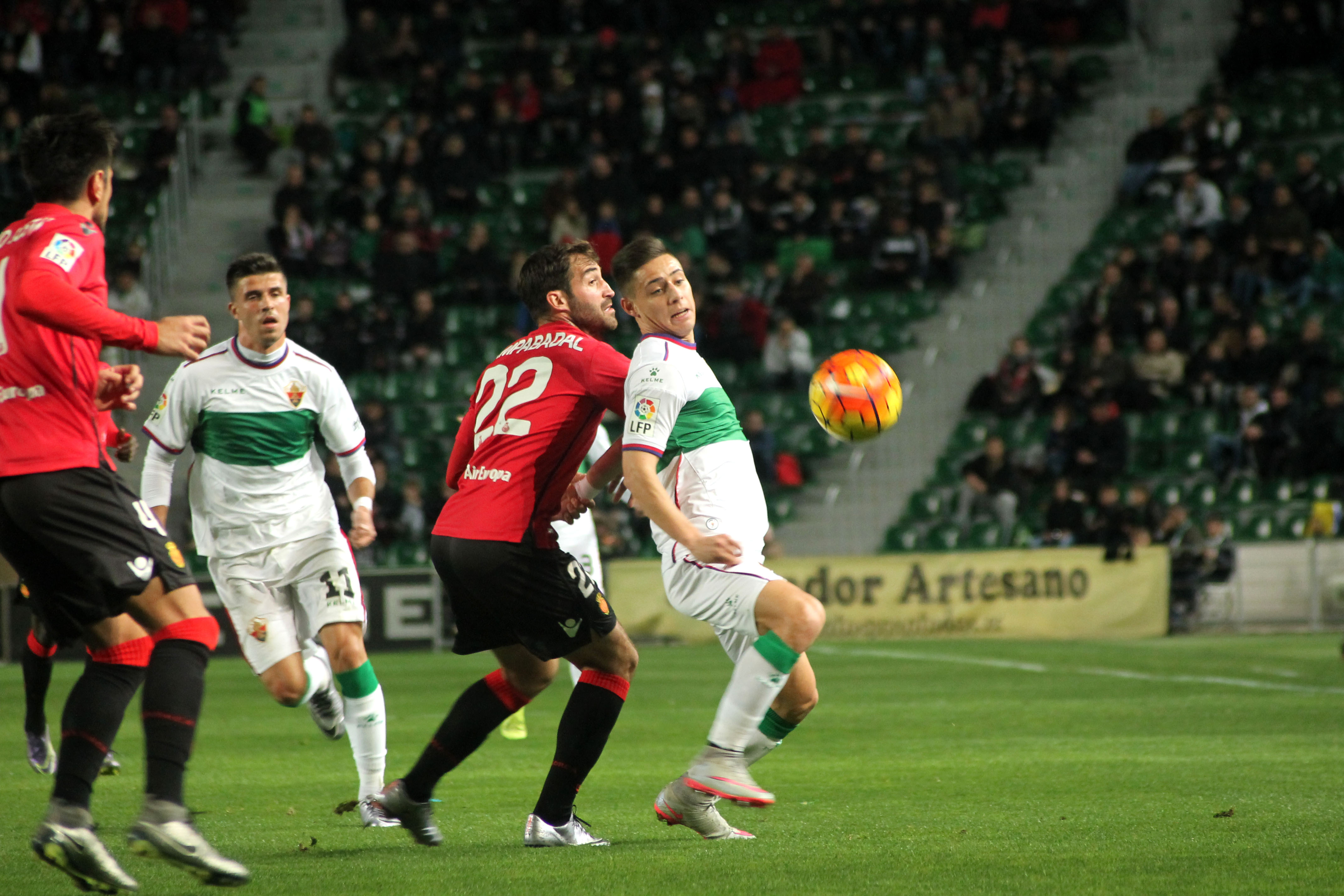
Elche–Mallorca at Martínez Valero

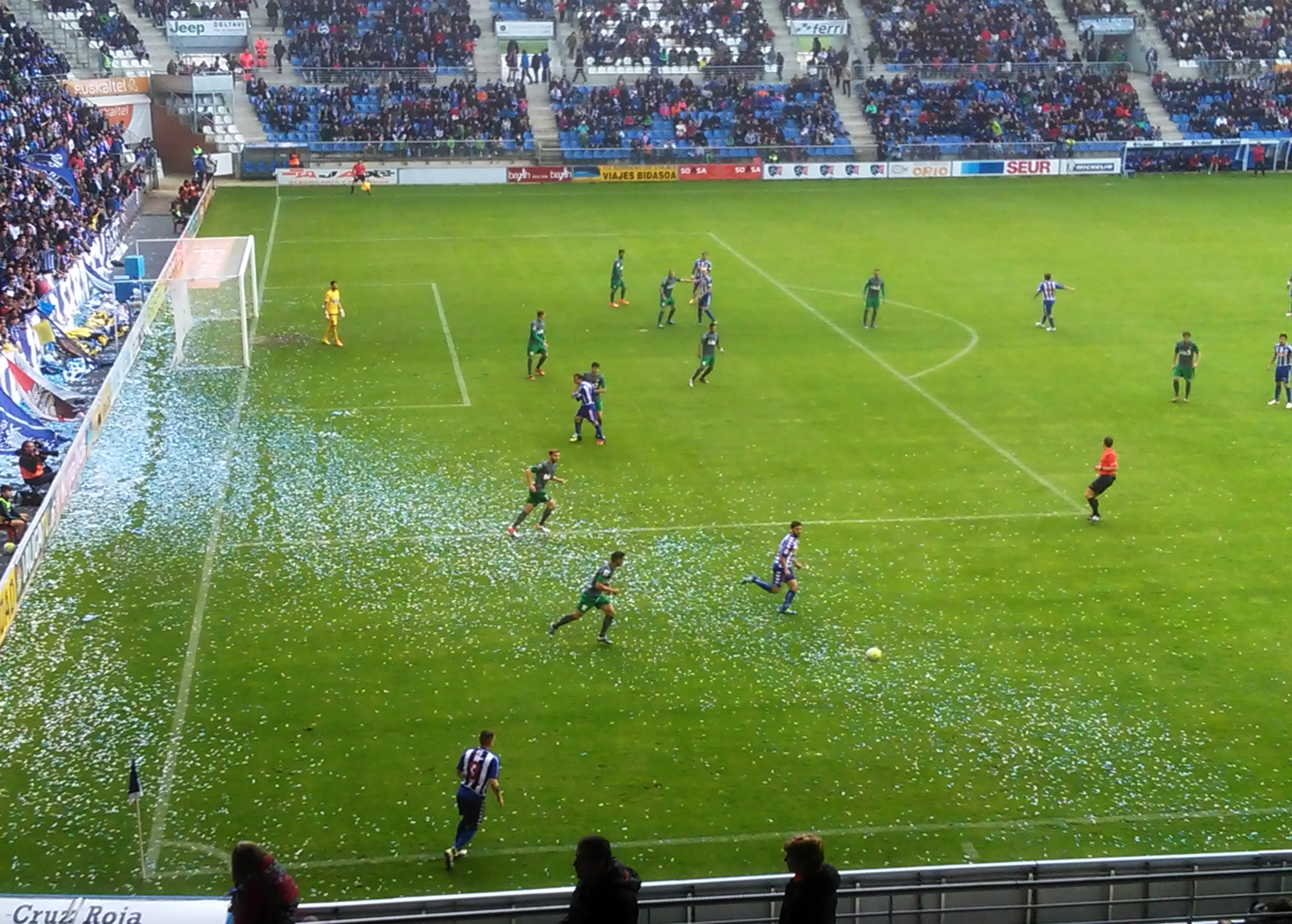
Alavés–Ponferradina at Mendizorrotza

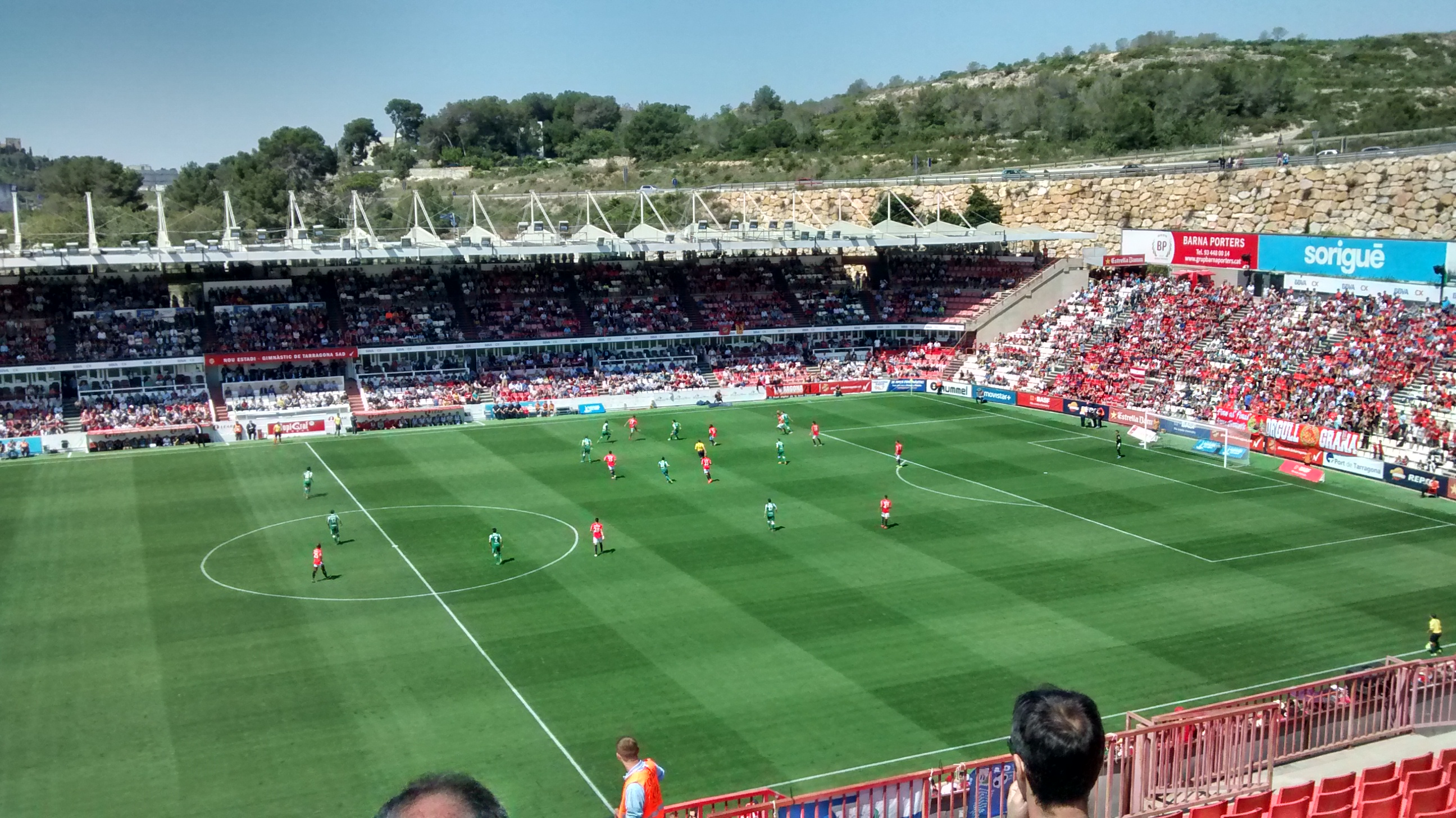
Gimnàstic–Leganés at Nou Estadi

Pos	Team	Total	High	Low	Average	Change
1	Zaragoza	350,943	23,765	13,996	16,712	+6.5%
2	Córdoba	312,852	18,567	9,221	14,221	−8.9%^{1}
3	Oviedo	291,670	22,634	8,137	13,889	+0.8%^{2}
4	Osasuna	317,947	17,830	11,121	13,824	+5.0%
5	Alavés	235,227	17,509	9,156	11,201	+19.2%
6	Elche	191,350	12,597	5,153	9,112	−57.9%^{1}
7	Tenerife	191,197	11,770	7,286	9,105	−2.8%
8	Mallorca	179,358	14,497	5,012	8,541	+39.6%
9	Valladolid	177,914	11,831	5,931	8,472	−15.5%
10	Almería	163,297	9,299	6,362	7,776	−25.5%^{1}
11	Bilbao Athletic	155,386	13,191	727	7,399	+489.1%^{2}
12	Albacete	139,124	10,092	2,221	6,625	−11.5%
13	Gimnàstic	142,194	13,251	3,602	6,463	+24.0%^{2}
14	Leganés	107,759	8,138	3,119	5,131	+8.3%
15	Ponferradina	105,589	7,192	3,762	5,028	+4.3%
16	Girona	104,459	8,733	2,654	4,542	−20.1%
17	Lugo	76,786	5,182	2,651	3,656	+11.6%
18	Mirandés	72,599	5,348	2,743	3,457	+2.2%
19	Numancia	61,750	7,606	2,146	2,940	+0.7%
20	Huesca	60,578	4,752	2,404	2,885	+20.2%^{2}
21	Alcorcón	53,138	4,391	1,479	2,530	−4.4%
22	Llagostera	32,108	2,713	705	1,529	−33.9%
	League total	3,523,215	23,765	705	7,528	−13.2%

Updated to games played on 18 June 2016
Source: Official club websites and LaLiga.es
Notes:
1: Team played last season in La Liga.
2: Team played last season in Segunda División B.

== Awards ==
Month	Manager of the Month		Player of the Month		Reference
Month	Manager	Club	Player	Club	Reference
September	(Spain) Enrique Martín	Osasuna	(Spain) Sergio León	Elche	
October	(Serbia) Ranko Popović	Zaragoza	(Romania) Florin Andone	Córdoba	
November	(Spain) Vicente Moreno	Gimnàstic	(Spain) Óscar Plano	Alcorcón	
December	(Argentina) Sergio Egea	Oviedo	(Spain) Juan Villar	Valladolid	
January	(Spain) Asier Garitano	Leganés	(Argentina) Alexander Szymanowski	Leganés	
February	(Spain) Lluís Carreras	Zaragoza	(Spain) José Naranjo	Gimnàstic	
March	(Spain) José Antonio Durán	Lugo	(Cameroon) Achille Emaná	Gimnàstic	
April	(Spain) Pablo Machín	Girona	(Spain) Isaac Becerra	Girona	
May	(Spain) José Bordalás	Alavés	(Spain) Manu García	Alavés	
June	(Spain) Enrique Martín	Osasuna	(Spain) Mikel Merino	Osasuna	
