= 2014–15 Segunda División =

84th season of the second-tier football league in Spain

Segunda División
- Season: 2014–15
- Champions: Betis
- Promoted: Betis; Sporting de Gijón; Las Palmas
- Relegated: Racing Santander; Recreativo; Sabadell; Barcelona B
- Matches: 446
- Goals: 1,091 (2.45 per match)
- Top goalscorer: Rubén Castro (32 goals)
- Best goalkeeper: Iván Cuéllar
- Biggest home win: Valladolid 7–0 Barcelona B (21 December 2014)
- Biggest away win: Mallorca 1–5 Valladolid (25 January 2015)
- Highest scoring: Numancia 6–6 Lugo (20 December 2014)
- Longest winning run: 5 games Betis; Mallorca
- Longest unbeaten run: 20 games Sporting de Gijón
- Longest winless run: 13 games Recreativo
- Longest losing run: 7 games Albacete
- Highest attendance: 48,462; Betis 3–0 Alcorcón (24 May 2015)
- Lowest attendance: 1,231; Llagostera 0–1 Mirandés (31 May 2015)
- Average attendance: 8,674
- All statistics correct as of 21 June 2015.

The 2014–15 Segunda División season (known as the Liga Adelante for sponsorship reasons) is the 84th since its establishment. The campaign began on 23 August 2014 and the league phase of 42 rounds ended on 7 June 2015. The entire season ended on 21 June 2015 with the promotion play-off finals.

== Teams ==
=== Promotion and relegation (pre-season) ===
A total of 22 teams will contest the league, including 15 sides from the 2013–14 season, four promoted from the 2013–14 Segunda División B and three relegated from the 2013–14 La Liga.

Teams relegated from the 2013–14 La Liga

- Osasuna (After 14 years)
- Real Valladolid (After 2 years)
- Real Betis (After 3 years)

Teams promoted from the 2013–14 Segunda División B

- Racing de Santander (Immediate return)
- Albacete (After 3 years)
- Llagostera (Debut season)
- Leganés (After 10 years)

=== Murcia and Racing case ===
Due to their financial problems, Murcia and Racing de Santander were threatened with being relegated to the Segunda División B. On 1 August 2014, LaLiga published an official statement announcing that Murcia was not able to be registered in the league, while Racing had five days to present the additional economic-financial information requested by the association.

On 7 August, LaLiga decided to relegate Murcia to the Segunda División B, whereby Mirandés remained in the Segunda despite being in a relegation position.

On 13 August, despite LaLiga being forced to re-admit Murcia and suspending its relegation to Segunda División B, the League announced in a new statement that it could not allow Murcia to play in the Segunda and, the next day, suspended the start of the championship.

A new judgement confirmed the relegation of Murcia and the Segunda started with Mirandés completing the 22 teams.

== Stadia and locations ==
Location of teams in 2014–15 Segunda División
Canary Islands

Team	Home city	Stadium	Capacity
Alavés	Vitoria	Mendizorroza	19,840
Albacete	Albacete	Carlos Belmonte	17,300
Alcorcón	Alcorcón	Santo Domingo	6,000
Barcelona B	Barcelona	Mini Estadi	15,276
Betis	Sevilla	Benito Villamarín	52,500
Girona	Girona	Montilivi	9,286
Las Palmas	Las Palmas de Gran Canaria	Estadio Gran Canaria	31,250
Leganés	Leganés	Butarque	8,138
Llagostera	Llagostera	Palamós Costa Brava^{1}	5,824
Lugo	Lugo	Anxo Carro	7,840
Mallorca	Palma	Iberostar Estadio	23,142
Mirandés	Miranda de Ebro	Anduva	6,000
Numancia	Soria	Los Pajaritos	9,025
Osasuna	Pamplona	El Sadar	19,800
Ponferradina	Ponferrada	El Toralín	8,800
Racing Santander	Santander	El Sardinero	22,222
Recreativo	Huelva	Nuevo Colombino	21,670
Sabadell	Sabadell	Nova Creu Alta	11,981
Sporting de Gijón	Gijón	El Molinón	29,029
Tenerife	Santa Cruz de Tenerife	Heliodoro Rodríguez López	24,000
Valladolid	Valladolid	José Zorrilla	26,512
Zaragoza	Zaragoza	La Romareda	34,596

Notes

- Note 1: Llagostera will play their home matches at Estadi Palamós Costa Brava, Palamós as their own Estadi Municipal did not meet LFP criteria. It was initially planned for the club to play at Estadi Montilivi, Girona, but Girona FC rejected to share its stadium.

=== Personnel and sponsorship ===
Team	Chairman	Head coach	Captain	Kit manufacturer	Main shirt sponsor
Alavés	(Spain) Alfonso Fernández de Trocóniz	(Spain) Alberto López	(Spain) Manu García	Hummel	Euskaltel
Albacete	(Spain) José Miguel Garrido	(Spain) Luis César Sampedro	(Spain) Francisco Noguerol	Hummel	Aurgi
Alcorcón	(Belgium) Roland Duchâtelet	(Spain) José Bordalás	(Spain) Rubén Sanz	Erreà	Novanca
Barcelona B	(Spain) Josep Maria Bartomeu	(Spain) Jordi Vinyals	(Spain) Sergio Juste	Nike	Qatar Airways
Betis	(Spain) Manuel Domínguez	(Spain) Pepe Mel	(Spain) Jorge Molina	Macron	
Girona	(Spain) Francesc Rebled	(Spain) Pablo Machín	(Spain) Jandro	Kappa	La Bruixa d'Or
Las Palmas	(Spain) Miguel Ángel Ramírez	(Spain) Paco Herrera	(Spain) David García	Acerbis	Gran Canaria
Leganés	(Spain) María Victoria Pavón	(Spain) Asier Garitano	(Spain) Sergio Postigo	Joma	
Llagostera	(Spain) Isabel Tarragó	(Spain) Lluís Carrillo	(Spain) Diego Rivas	Gedo	City Lift
Lugo	(Spain) José Bouso	(Spain) Quique Setién	(Spain) Manu	CDLU	Estrella Galicia
Mallorca	(Germany) Utz Claassen	(Spain) Miquel Soler	(Spain) José Luis Martí	Macron	Air Europa
Mirandés	(Spain) Ramiro Revuelta	(Spain) Carlos Terrazas	(Spain) César Caneda	Erreà	Miranda de Ebro
Numancia	(Spain) Francisco Rubio	(Spain) Juan Antonio Anquela	(Spain) Javier del Pino	Erreà	Solarig
Osasuna	(Spain) Miguel Archanco	(Spain) Enrique Martín	(Spain) Miguel Flaño	Adidas	Lacturale
Ponferradina	(Spain) José Fernández Nieto	(Spain) José Manuel Díaz	(Brazil) Yuri de Souza	Adidas	Bio3
Racing de Santander	(Spain) Juan Antonio Sañudo	(Spain) Javier Pinillos	(Spain) Mario Fernández	Kelme	
Recreativo	(Spain) Pablo Comas-Mata	(Portugal) José Dominguez	(Spain) David Córcoles	Adidas	
Sabadell	(Japan) Keisuke Sakamoto	(Spain) Juan Carlos Mandiá	(Spain) Antonio Hidalgo	Kelme	
Sporting de Gijón	(Spain) Antonio Veiga	(Spain) Abelardo Fernández	(Spain) Iván Hernández	Kappa	Gijón, Ternera Asturiana, Telecable, Air Europa, Nissan
Tenerife	(Spain) Miguel Concepción	(Spain) Raül Agné	(Spain) Suso	Hummel	Tenerife
Valladolid	(Spain) Carlos Suárez	(Spain) Rubi	(Spain) Óscar	Hummel	Cuatro Rayas
Zaragoza	(Spain) Christian Lapetra	(Serbia) Ranko Popović	(Spain) Javi Álamo	Mercury	Caravan Fragancias

1. Additionally, 18 teams showed the logo of Sockatyes in their socks since matchday 8 as a result of a sponsorship agreement with the LFP (all except FC Barcelona B, RCD Mallorca, Osasuna and Tenerife). In these agreement those teams showed the logo of La Quiniela.

=== Managerial changes ===
Team	Outgoing manager	Manner of departure	Date of vacancy	Position in table	Replaced by	Date of appointment
Betis	Gabriel Calderón	Mutual consent	19 May 2014	Pre-season	Julio Velázquez	16 June 2014
Osasuna	Javi Gracia	Resigned	21 May 2014	Pre-season	Jan Urban	3 July 2014
Valladolid	Juan Ignacio Martínez	Sacked	21 May 2014	Pre-season	Rubi	3 June 2014
Ponferradina	Claudio Barragán	Resigned	11 June 2014	Pre-season	José Manuel Díaz	3 July 2014
Recreativo	Sergi Barjuán	Resigned	10 June 2014	Pre-season	José Luis Oltra	27 June 2014
Llagostera	Oriol Alsina	Resigned	25 June 2014	Pre-season	Santi Castillejo	26 June 2014
Las Palmas	Josico	Mutual consent	25 June 2014	Pre-season	Paco Herrera	4 July 2014
Mallorca	Javier Olaizola	End of contract	30 June 2014	Pre-season	Miquel Soler	11 July 2014
Mallorca	Miquel Soler	Sacked	12 August 2014	Pre-season	Valeri Karpin	12 August 2014
Llagostera	Santi Castillejo	Sacked	21 October 2014	20th	Lluís Carrillo	22 October 2014
Sabadell	Miquel Olmo	Sacked	23 November 2014	20th	Àlex García	24 November 2014
Zaragoza	Víctor Muñoz	Sacked	24 November 2014	8th	Ranko Popović	24 November 2014
Betis	Julio Velázquez	Sacked	25 November 2014	6th	Juan Merino (caretaker)	25 November 2014
Betis	Juan Merino	End of tenure as caretaker	19 December 2014	4th	Pepe Mel	19 December 2014
Tenerife	Álvaro Cervera	Sacked	2 February 2015	19th	Raül Agné	3 February 2015
Sabadell	Àlex García	Resigned	5 February 2015	22nd	Txus Serrano	5 February 2015
Barcelona B	Eusebio Sacristán	Sacked	9 February 2015	17th	Jordi Vinyals	9 February 2015
Mallorca	Valeri Karpin	Sacked	9 February 2015	15th	Miquel Soler	9 February 2015
Sabadell	Txus Serrano	End of tenure as caretaker	10 February 2015	22nd	Juan Carlos Mandiá	10 February 2015
Recreativo	José Luis Oltra	Sacked	10 February 2015	21st	Juan Manuel Pavón	10 February 2015
Osasuna	Jan Urban	Sacked	28 February 2015	16th	José Manuel Mateo	28 February 2015
Racing Santander	Paco Fernández	Sacked	3 March 2015	21st	Javier Pinillos	4 March 2015
Recreativo	Juan Manuel Pavón	Sacked	24 March 2015	20th	José Dominguez	24 March 2015
Osasuna	José Manuel Mateo	Sacked	4 May 2015	19th	Enrique Martín	5 May 2015

== League table ==
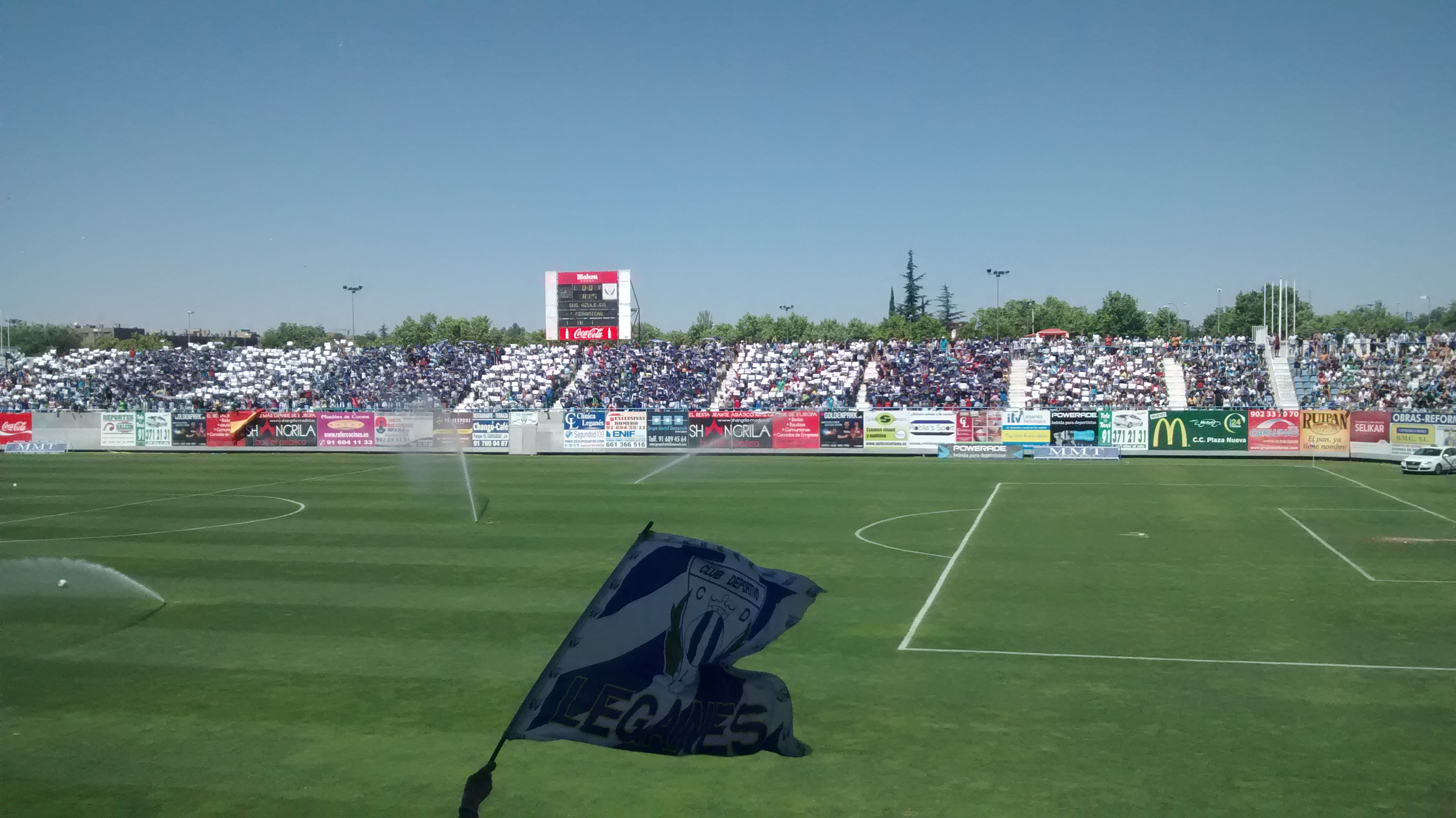
CD Leganés returned to Segunda División ten seasons later

Pos	Team	Pld	W	D	L	GF	GA	GD	Pts	Promotion, qualification or relegation
1	Real Betis (C, P)	42	25	9	8	73	40	+33	84	Promotion to La Liga
2	Sporting Gijón (P)	42	21	19	2	57	27	+30	82 (Note: Sporting Gijón finished ahead of Girona on goal difference; Sporting de Gijón +30, Girona +28)	Promotion to La Liga
3	Girona	42	24	10	8	63	35	+28	82	Qualification to promotion play-offs
4	Las Palmas (O, P)	42	22	12	8	73	47	+26	78	Qualification to promotion play-offs
5	Valladolid	42	21	9	12	65	40	+25	72	Qualification to promotion play-offs
6	Zaragoza	42	15	16	11	61	58	+3	61	Qualification to promotion play-offs
7	Ponferradina	42	16	12	14	55	51	+4	60	
8	Mirandés	42	16	11	15	42	44	−2	59	
9	Llagostera	42	15	12	15	41	41	0	57	
10	Leganés	42	15	11	16	48	42	+6	56	
11	Alcorcón	42	12	18	12	44	49	−5	54	
12	Numancia	42	12	17	13	54	55	−1	53 (Note: Numancia ahead on head-to-head record; Numancia-Alavés 1-0, Alavés-Numancia 0-3)	
13	Alavés	42	14	11	17	49	53	−4	53	
14	Albacete	42	14	9	19	55	65	−10	51	
15	Lugo	42	11	16	15	48	56	−8	49	
16	Mallorca	42	13	9	20	51	64	−13	48 (Note: Mallorca ahead on head-to-head record; Mallorca-Tenerife 2-1, Tenerife-Mallorca 0-0)	
17	Tenerife	42	11	15	16	41	48	−7	48	
18	Osasuna	42	11	12	19	41	60	−19	45	
19	Racing Santander (R)	42	12	8	22	42	53	−11	44	Relegation to Segunda División B
20	Recreativo (R)	42	10	11	21	37	59	−22	41	Relegation to Segunda División B
21	Sabadell (R)	42	8	14	20	41	66	−25	38	Relegation to Segunda División B
22	Barcelona B (R)	42	9	9	24	55	83	−28	36	Relegation to Segunda División B

Source: LFP - Liga Adelante
Rules for classification: 1) points; 2) head-to-head points; 3) head-to-head goal difference; 4) goal difference; 5) number of goals scored
(C) Champions; (O) Play-off winners; (P) Promoted; (R) Relegated

=== Positions by round ===
Team ╲ Round	1	2	3	4	5	6	7	8	9	10	11	12	13	14	15	16	17	18	19	20	21	22	23	24	25	26	27	28	29	30	31	32	33	34	35	36	37	38	39	40	41	42
Betis	4	1	8	9	8	5	5	7	9	7	7	5	6	6	5	5	4	3	5	4	2	2	4	5	5	3	5	2	1	1	1	1	1	1	1	1	1	1	1	1	1	1
Sporting Gijón	5	2	3	7	3	4	4	3	4	3	4	3	4	3	3	2	2	2	2	3	5	4	3	3	4	2	4	3	2	2	2	3	3	2	3	3	3	3	3	3	3	2
Girona	7	3	1	2	4	6	2	1	1	1	2	4	2	2	2	3	3	5	4	5	4	5	2	2	3	5	3	5	5	5	4	2	4	3	2	2	2	2	2	2	2	3
Las Palmas	2	5	2	1	1	1	1	4	2	4	3	1	1	1	1	1	1	1	1	1	1	1	1	1	1	1	1	1	4	4	3	4	2	4	4	4	5	4	4	4	4	4
Valladolid	6	10	6	5	2	2	3	2	3	2	1	2	3	4	4	4	5	4	3	2	3	3	5	4	2	4	2	4	3	3	5	5	5	5	5	5	4	5	5	5	5	5
Zaragoza	14	13	18	19	13	10	7	8	7	5	5	7	8	8	6	8	6	7	7	9	7	7	6	6	6	6	6	7	6	6	6	6	6	7	7	6	6	6	6	6	6	6
Ponferradina	8	11	5	3	5	3	6	5	5	6	6	6	5	5	7	6	8	6	6	6	6	6	7	7	7	7	7	6	7	7	7	7	7	6	6	7	7	9	8	7	7	7
Mirandés	12	6	13	15	18	20	19	19	16	18	20	20	20	18	14	11	9	9	8	7	8	8	8	8	10	10	11	14	11	13	14	14	14	14	14	13	13	13	13	9	8	8
Llagostera	22	12	16	16	10	16	15	17	19	20	21	21	21	21	22	22	20	19	19	21	19	17	20	16	14	12	14	12	13	11	8	8	8	8	8	8	8	7	7	8	10	9
Leganés	10	19	11	12	12	17	12	13	12	12	11	15	15	19	16	17	14	11	12	11	13	14	11	9	8	8	8	9	8	8	9	11	10	10	10	11	10	11	11	12	9	10
Alcorcón	3	8	7	8	15	11	13	10	13	13	17	11	11	9	8	7	7	8	9	8	9	9	10	11	11	13	10	13	14	12	12	13	13	13	13	12	12	10	10	11	12	11
Numancia	18	20	15	18	11	14	18	18	20	21	19	19	19	15	11	9	10	10	10	10	10	11	12	10	9	9	9	8	9	9	10	12	12	11	11	9	11	12	12	13	13	12
Alavés	9	14	9	10	16	12	11	14	11	11	10	13	13	10	12	14	11	12	14	14	14	12	13	13	13	11	15	15	15	14	11	9	9	9	9	10	9	8	9	10	11	13
Albacete	15	16	17	11	17	18	21	22	22	22	22	22	22	22	21	21	22	22	22	22	22	21	18	19	20	19	17	17	17	17	17	17	17	15	16	15	15	16	16	14	14	14
Lugo	11	7	14	14	14	9	9	9	10	10	13	10	10	12	9	10	12	13	15	15	16	15	17	14	16	15	13	11	10	10	13	10	11	12	12	14	14	14	15	16	15	15
Mallorca	17	17	19	20	22	22	22	21	18	14	12	8	9	11	13	15	15	16	13	13	11	13	14	15	15	14	12	10	12	15	15	16	16	17	15	16	16	15	14	15	16	16
Tenerife	20	18	20	17	19	15	20	20	21	17	16	16	17	17	20	16	18	15	16	16	15	16	19	20	19	17	18	16	16	16	16	15	15	16	17	17	17	17	17	17	17	17
Osasuna	1	4	12	13	9	13	14	16	14	15	14	14	14	16	18	19	17	14	11	12	12	10	9	12	12	16	16	18	18	18	18	19	18	20	19	19	18	18	18	19	18	18
Racing Santander	19	21	21	22	21	19	16	15	17	19	18	18	18	14	17	18	19	20	20	19	18	19	16	18	18	20	21	19	19	19	19	21	19	18	20	20	19	19	19	18	19	19
Recreativo	13	15	10	6	7	8	8	6	6	8	8	9	7	7	10	13	16	17	17	17	20	20	21	21	21	21	20	20	20	20	20	18	20	21	22	22	22	22	22	20	20	20
Sabadell	16	22	22	21	20	21	17	12	15	16	15	17	16	20	19	20	21	21	21	20	21	22	22	22	22	22	22	22	22	22	22	22	21	19	18	18	20	20	20	21	21	21
Barcelona B	21	9	4	4	6	7	10	11	8	9	9	12	12	13	15	12	13	18	18	18	17	18	15	17	17	18	19	21	21	21	21	20	22	22	21	21	21	21	21	22	22	22

Notes: The table lists the positions of teams after each week of matches. In order to preserve chronological evolvements, any postponed matches are not included to the round at which they were originally scheduled, but added to the full round they were played immediately afterwards. For example, if a match is scheduled for matchday 13, but then postponed and played between days 16 and 17, it will be added to the standings for day 17.

== Results ==
Home \ Away	ALV	ALB	ALC	BAR	BET	GIR	LPA	LEG	LAG	LUG	MLL	MIR	NUM	OSA	PNF	RAC	REC	SAB	RSG	TEN	VLD	ZAR
Alavés	—	2–1	1–1	2–3	1–2	0–3	1–1	2–0	0–0	1–0	2–0	1–3	0–2	3–0	2–1	2–1	0–0	3–1	0–0	1–0	0–2	4–0
Albacete	2–3	—	2–3	2–1	0–0	0–1	1–0	1–0	0–2	3–0	4–2	0–0	0–1	2–0	2–1	0–1	3–1	0–0	1–1	3–2	3–4	2–2
Alcorcón	0–1	2–3	—	3–1	0–0	1–2	0–0	1–0	2–0	1–0	0–0	2–2	1–1	2–0	1–1	2–0	1–1	3–2	0–0	0–0	0–1	1–3
Barcelona B	0–0	1–2	4–1	—	1–2	2–4	0–2	2–5	0–1	0–1	2–4	1–3	1–1	0–1	2–1	1–1	3–1	3–1	0–0	2–2	1–3	4–1
Betis	1–2	0–1	3–0	1–0	—	2–1	0–0	1–3	2–2	5–1	1–0	2–0	2–1	3–0	1–1	2–0	3–2	2–0	0–3	3–1	4–0	4–0
Girona	2–2	2–2	3–0	0–1	1–3	—	1–2	2–1	1–0	1–1	0–0	3–0	2–1	3–0	3–0	1–0	2–0	0–0	0–0	2–0	2–1	1–1
Las Palmas	3–2	2–1	4–1	4–3	0–3	2–0	—	1–0	2–0	3–0	2–1	0–0	2–0	1–2	4–2	1–0	3–0	2–0	1–1	1–1	1–1	5–3
Leganés	1–1	2–0	1–2	2–0	1–0	1–2	2–1	—	2–0	2–0	3–1	0–0	0–0	1–1	1–1	2–2	2–0	1–1	0–1	2–0	1–0	2–2
Llagostera	3–1	2–3	0–0	1–0	0–2	1–2	0–0	2–0	—	3–2	1–4	0–1	0–0	0–0	3–1	0–2	1–0	0–1	0–0	2–0	2–0	0–1
Lugo	3–2	1–1	0–0	3–2	0–1	1–2	2–1	0–0	1–1	—	4–0	1–1	1–1	4–3	0–0	0–0	2–1	2–1	1–2	1–0	1–0	3–3
Mallorca	2–0	2–0	1–1	3–3	1–2	0–1	1–1	0–2	0–1	2–1	—	2–0	1–1	3–0	1–0	2–3	1–2	1–0	0–1	2–1	1–5	3–2
Mirandés	3–0	3–2	1–2	2–3	0–0	0–1	2–1	1–0	1–0	0–0	2–0	—	2–0	1–0	2–1	0–2	2–1	0–0	0–2	1–1	0–0	1–1
Numancia	1–0	1–1	2–2	1–0	1–1	2–2	4–2	1–1	3–2	6–6	1–2	1–0	—	0–0	1–3	0–2	1–2	3–0	1–2	3–3	0–1	2–0
Osasuna	1–3	2–1	1–1	2–0	3–2	0–0	1–2	2–1	0–1	0–2	6–4	2–0	1–1	—	0–1	0–2	2–0	0–0	0–0	3–2	2–1	0–1
Ponferradina	2–1	1–0	1–1	4–4	4–1	3–0	2–2	1–1	0–1	1–0	3–1	1–0	1–2	1–0	—	1–1	3–3	3–0	0–2	1–0	2–0	1–1
Racing Santander	1–1	1–0	0–1	0–0	2–4	0–1	1–2	1–2	0–2	1–0	0–1	1–2	1–1	2–0	0–1	—	3–0	3–1	1–1	1–0	1–4	0–2
Recreativo	0–0	4–1	2–1	2–0	0–1	0–3	2–4	1–0	2–0	0–0	0–0	0–1	0–3	1–1	0–1	1–0	—	3–1	1–1	1–1	0–3	0–0
Sabadell	2–1	6–1	0–1	1–4	2–3	0–2	2–2	1–2	1–1	2–1	1–1	3–2	0–3	2–2	1–0	3–2	1–0	—	2–2	1–3	0–0	0–0
Sporting Gijón	1–0	2–1	2–1	0–0	1–2	1–1	1–1	2–1	0–0	2–1	1–0	4–1	3–0	2–0	2–1	3–1	1–1	2–0	—	2–0	1–1	3–1
Tenerife	1–1	1–1	1–1	2–0	2–0	0–1	2–1	1–0	0–0	1–1	0–0	1–0	0–0	2–1	0–1	1–0	0–2	1–0	1–1	—	2–0	1–1
Valladolid	2–0	0–1	1–0	7–0	0–0	1–0	1–2	2–0	2–4	0–0	2–1	2–1	4–0	1–1	0–0	3–1	1–0	0–0	3–0	2–1	—	1–3
Zaragoza	1–0	3–1	1–1	4–0	2–2	2–1	0–2	2–0	2–2	0–0	2–0	0–1	1–0	1–1	4–1	2–1	2–0	1–1	1–1	2–3	0–2	—

Source: BDFutbol
Legend: Blue = home team win; Yellow = draw; Red = away team win.

== Promotion play-offs ==
Teams in position 3-6 at the end of the regular season will compete in a play-off for one place in 2015–16 La Liga.

Semifinals
6	Zaragoza (a)	0	4	4
3	Girona	3	1	4
5	Valladolid	1	0	1
4	Las Palmas (a)	1	0	1

Final
6	Zaragoza	3	0	3
4	Las Palmas (a)	1	2	3

=== Semi-finals ===
==== First leg ====
11 June 2015	Zaragoza	0–3	Girona	Zaragoza
20:00 (CEST)		Summary	Mata 23', 59'; Lejeune 45'	Stadium: La Romareda; Attendance: 15,000; Referee: Valdés Aller

10 June 2015	Valladolid	1–1	Las Palmas	Valladolid
20:00 (CEST)	Hernán Pérez 23'	Summary	Araujo 9'	Stadium: José Zorilla; Attendance: 19,100; Referee: Arias López

==== Second leg ====
14 June 2015	Girona	1–4 (4–4a agg.)	Zaragoza	Girona
17:00 (CEST)	Aday 73'	Summary	Willian José 20' (pen.), 35'; Cabrera 44'; Fernández 67'	Stadium: Montilivi; Attendance: 8,348; Referee: Arcediano Monescillo

13 June 2015	Las Palmas	0–0 (1a–1 agg.)	Valladolid	Las Palmas
20:00 (CEST)		Summary		Stadium: Gran Canaria; Attendance: 17,312; Referee: Sagués Oscoz

=== Final ===
==== First leg ====
17 June 2015	Zaragoza	3–1	Las Palmas	Zaragoza
20:00 (CEST)	Diego Rico 39'; Pedro 48'; Willian José 75'	Report	Jonathan Viera 19'	Stadium: La Romareda; Attendance: 32,000; Referee: Piñeiro Crespo

==== Second leg ====
21 June 2015	Las Palmas	2–0 (3a–3 agg.)	Zaragoza	Las Palmas
18:00 (WEST)	Roque Mesa 33'; Araujo 85'	Report		Stadium: Gran Canaria; Attendance: 28,232; Referee: Ocón Arráiz

Promoted to La Liga
Las Palmas
(13 years later)

== Season statistics ==
=== Top goalscorers ===
Rank	Player	Club	Goals
1	(Spain) Rubén Castro	Betis	32
2	(Spain) Borja Bastón	Zaragoza	23
2	(Argentina) Sergio Araujo	Las Palmas	23
4	(Spain) David Rodríguez	Alcorcón	20
5	(Spain) Jorge Molina	Betis	19
6	(Spain) Urko Vera	Mirandés	17
6	(Brazil) Yuri de Souza	Ponferradina	17
8	(Spain) Francisco Sandaza	Girona	16
8	(Spain) Sergi Enrich	Numancia	16
8	(Spain) Óscar González	Valladolid	16

=== Zamora Trophy ===
The Zamora Trophy is awarded by newspaper Marca to the goalkeeper with least goals-to-games ratio. Keepers must play at least 28 games of 60 or more minutes to be eligible for the trophy.

In the table, only goalkeepers with at least the 75% of the games played are included.

Rank	Name	Club	GA	Pld	Avg
1	(Spain) Iván Cuéllar	Sporting	21	36	0.58
2	(Spain) Isaac Becerra	Girona	35	42	0.83
3	(Spain) Javi Varas	Valladolid	33	38	0.87
4	(Spain) Antonio Adán	Betis	35	40	0.88
5	(Spain) René Hinojo	Llagostera	30	33	0.91
6	(Spain) Mario Fernández	Racing	43	32	1.34
7	(Spain) Jesús Cabrero	Mallorca	49	36	1.36
8	(Spain) Nauzet Pérez	Sabadell	54	38	1.42

=== Hat-tricks ===
Player	For	Against	Result	Date
(Brazil) Yuri de Souza	Ponferradina	Betis	4–1	7 September 2014
(Spain) Borja Lázaro	Leganés	Mallorca	3–1	7 September 2014
(Spain) Jonathan Pereira	Valladolid	Mallorca	5–1	25 January 2015
(Spain) Rubén Castro	Betis	Valladolid	4–0	8 March 2015
(Spain) Javier Eraso	Leganés	Barcelona B	5–2	31 May 2015

== Attendances ==
Attendances include playoff games.

Pos	Team	Total	High	Low	Average	Change
1	Betis	643,431	48,462	25,007	30,640	+1.3%^{1}
2	Sporting Gijón	405,686	26,873	12,240	19,318	+12.6%
3	Las Palmas	368,431	28,232	8,430	16,019	+34.4%
4	Zaragoza	360,954	32,000	7,000	15,694	+59.2%
5	Osasuna	277,028	17,720	10,585	13,162	−11.4%^{1}
6	Valladolid	220,552	19,100	5,093	10,025	−35.2%^{1}
7	Alavés	197,382	12,171	7,621	9,399	−4.8%
8	Tenerife	196,772	19,193	5,874	9,370	−9.8%
9	Racing Santander	187,328	17,855	6,556	8,920	+18.9%^{2}
10	Albacete	157,112	10,671	4,752	7,482	+25.8%^{2}
11	Mallorca	128,460	8,190	4,444	6,117	−34.2%
12	Girona	125,088	9,282	3,080	5,686	+18.0%
13	Recreativo	115,955	14,682	2,736	5,522	−22.1%
14	Ponferradina	101,234	7,378	2,630	4,821	−4.7%
15	Leganés	99,466	8,138	2,143	4,736	+35.3%^{2}
16	Sabadell	82,724	8,074	1,986	3,939	−5.3%
17	Barcelona B	79,994	12,356	1,564	3,809	+2.8%
18	Mirandés	70,993	4,306	2,513	3,381	−16.1%
19	Lugo	68,794	6,600	1,985	3,276	−10.9%
20	Numancia	61,339	6,305	1,466	2,921	−5.8%
21	Alcorcón	55,588	4,500	1,311	2,647	−15.9%
22	Llagostera	46,245	3,576	1,231	2,312	+182.3%^{2,3}
	League total	4,050,556	48,462	1,231	8,674	+11.4%

Updated to games played on 21 June 2015
Source: Official club websites and LFP.es
Notes:
1: Team played last season in La Liga
2: Team played last season in Segunda División B
3: Llagostera played game 2, against Leganés, behind closed doors

== Awards ==
Month	Manager of the Month		Player of the Month		Reference
Month	Manager	Club	Player	Club	Reference
September	(Spain) Abelardo Fernández	Sporting Gijón	(Argentina) Sergio Araujo	Las Palmas	
October	(Spain) Pablo Machín	Girona	(Spain) Marco Asensio	Mallorca	
November	(Spain) Paco Herrera	Las Palmas	(Spain) Sergi Enrich	Numancia	
December	(Spain) Carlos Terrazas	Mirandés	(Spain) Óscar	Valladolid	
January	(Spain) Pablo Machín	Girona	(Spain) Roque Mesa	Las Palmas	
February	(Spain) Lluís Carrillo	Llagostera	(Spain) Chuli	Leganés	
March	(Spain) Lluís Carrillo	Llagostera	(Spain) Manu Barreiro	Alavés	
April	(Spain) Pepe Mel	Betis	(Spain) René Hinojo	Llagostera	
May	(Spain) Pablo Machín	Girona	(Spain) Jonathan Viera	Las Palmas	

== Number of teams by autonomous community ==
	Autonomous Community	Number of teams	Teams
1	Castile and León	4	Mirandés, Numancia, Ponferradina and Valladolid
1	Catalonia	4	Barcelona B, Girona, Llagostera and Sabadell
3	Andalusia	2	Betis and Recreativo de Huelva
3	Canary Islands	2	Las Palmas and Tenerife
3	Community of Madrid	2	Alcorcón and Leganés
6	Aragon	1	Zaragoza
6	Asturias	1	Sporting de Gijón
6	Balearic Islands	1	Mallorca
6	Basque Country	1	Alavés
6	Cantabria	1	Racing de Santander
6	Castile-La Mancha	1	Albacete
6	Galicia	1	Lugo
6	Navarre	1	Osasuna

== See also ==
- List of Spanish football transfers summer 2014
- 2014–15 La Liga
- 2014–15 Segunda División B
- 2014–15 Copa del Rey
