= Segunda División Manager of the Month =

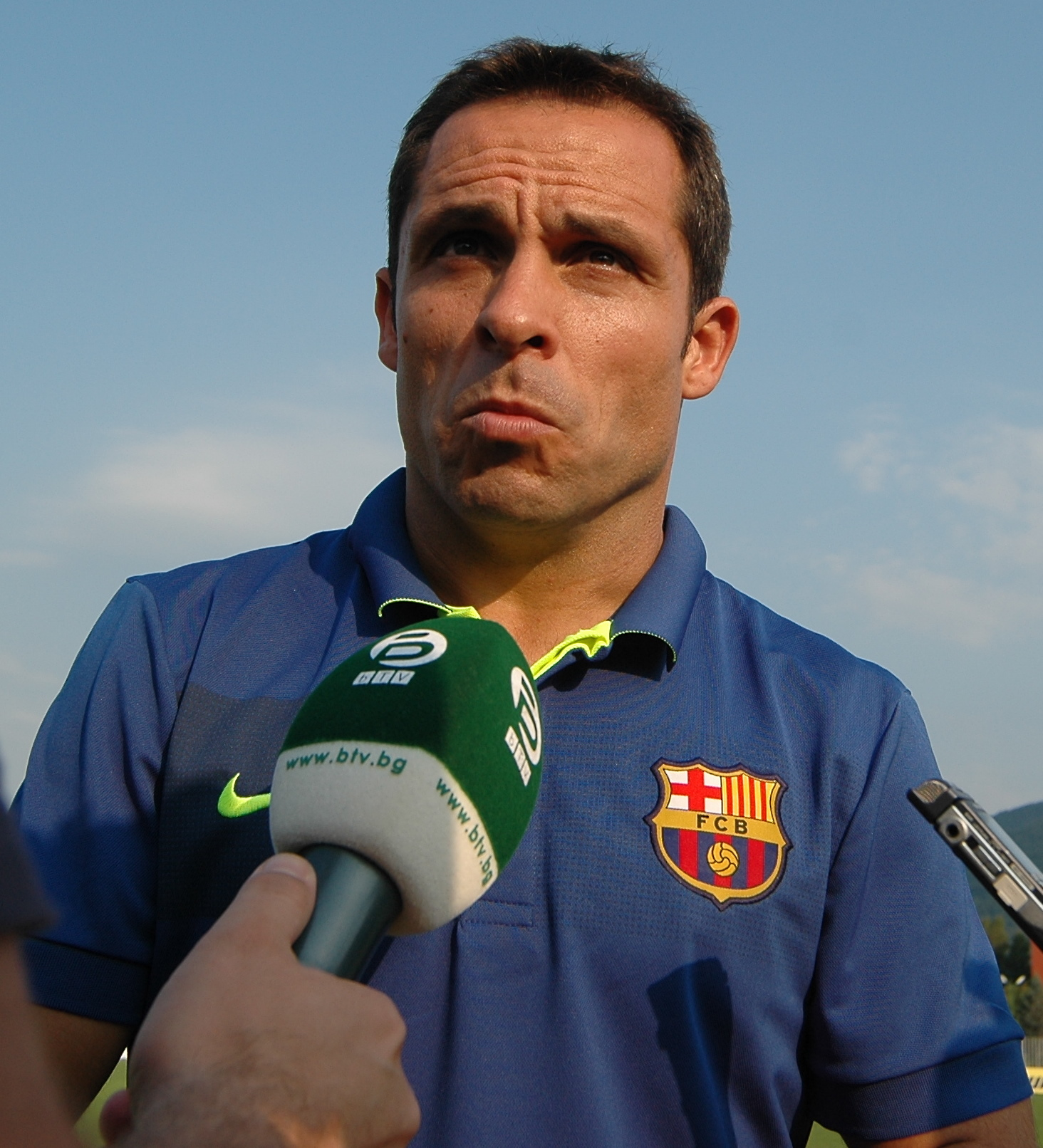
Sergi Barjuán won the first Manager of the Month award in September 2013.

The Segunda División Manager of the Month was an association football award that recognized the best Segunda División manager each month of the season. The award has been abandoned since the conclusion of the 2016–17 season.

== Winners ==
Month	Year (Note: Each year is linked to an article on the particular season associated with the month of that year.)	Manager	Nationality	Team	Ref
September	2013	Sergi Barjuán	Spain	Recreativo	
October	2013	Quique Setién	Spain	Lugo	
November	2013	Gaizka Garitano	Spain	Eibar	
December	2013	Gaizka Garitano	Spain	Eibar	
January	2014	Paco Herrera	Spain	Zaragoza	
February	2014	Gaizka Garitano	Spain	Eibar	
March	2014	Sergio Lobera	Spain	Las Palmas	
April	2014	Álvaro Cervera	Spain	Tenerife	
May	2014	José Bordalás	Spain	Alcorcón	
September	2014	Abelardo	Spain	Sporting Gijón	
October	2014	Pablo Machín	Spain	Girona	
November	2014	Paco Herrera	Spain	Las Palmas	
December	2014	Carlos Terrazas	Spain	Mirandés	
January	2015	Pablo Machín	Spain	Girona	
February	2015	Lluís Carrillo	Spain	Llagostera	
March	2015	Lluís Carrillo	Spain	Llagostera	
April	2015	Pepe Mel	Spain	Real Betis	
May	2015	Pablo Machín	Spain	Girona	
September	2015	Enrique Martín	Spain	Osasuna	
October	2015	Ranko Popović	Serbia	Zaragoza	
November	2015	Vicente Moreno	Spain	Gimnàstic	
December	2015	Sergio Egea	Argentina	Oviedo	
January	2016	Asier Garitano	Spain	Leganés	
February	2016	Lluís Carreras	Spain	Zaragoza	
March	2016	José Durán	Spain	Lugo	
April	2016	Pablo Machín	Spain	Girona	
May	2016	José Bordalás	Spain	Alavés	
June	2015	Enrique Martín	Spain	Osasuna	
August	2016	Juan Muñiz	Spain	Levante	
September	2016	Carlos Terrazas	Spain	Mirandés	
October	2016	Diego Martínez	Spain	Sevilla Atlético	
November	2016	Pablo Machín	Spain	Girona	
December	2016	Álvaro Cervera	Spain	Cádiz	
January	2017	Paco Herrera	Spain	Valladolid	
February	2017	José Luis Martí	Spain	Tenerife	
March	2017	Juan Antonio Anquela	Spain	Huesca	
April	2017	Míchel	Spain	Rayo Vallecano	
May	2017	Paco Herrera	Spain	Valladolid	

== Multiple winners ==
The following table lists the number of awards won by managers who have won at least two Manager of the Month awards.

Rank	Manager	Wins
1st	(Spain) Pablo Machín	5
2nd	(Spain) Paco Herrera	4
3rd	(Spain) Gaizka Garitano	3
4th	(Spain) José Bordalás	2
4th	(Spain) Lluís Carrillo	2
4th	(Spain) Enrique Martín	2
4th	(Spain) Carlos Terrazas	2

== Awards won by nationality ==
Nationality	Managers	Wins
Spain	22	36
Argentina	1	1
Serbia	1	1

== Awards won by club ==
Club	Managers	Wins
Girona	1	5
Zaragoza	3	3
Eibar	1	3
Las Palmas	2	2
Lugo	2	2
Tenerife	2	2
Llagostera	1	2
Mirandés	1	2
Osasuna	1	2
Valladolid	1	2
Alavés	1	1
Alcorcón	1	1
Cádiz	1	1
Gimnàstic	1	1
Huesca	1	1
Leganés	1	1
Levante	1	1
Oviedo	1	1
Rayo Vallecano	1	1
Real Betis	1	1
Recreativo	1	1
Sevilla Atlético	1	1
Sporting Gijón	1	1
