= Pepe Mel =

Spanish former footballer (born 1963)

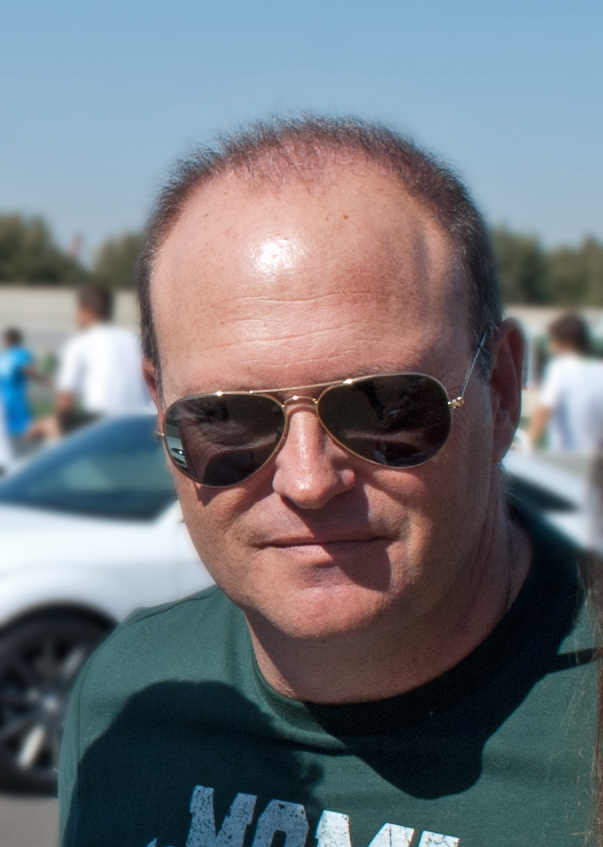
- Mel in 2011

Personal information
- Full name: José Mel Pérez
- Date of birth: 28 February 1963 (age 63)
- Place of birth: Madrid, Spain
- Height: 1.79 m (5 ft 10 in)
- Position: Striker

Youth career
- 1974–1982: Real Madrid

Senior career*
Years	Team	Apps	(Gls)
1982–1983	Real Madrid C		
1983–1987	Real Madrid B	72	(15)
1983–1984	→ Alcalá (loan)	52	(35)
1987	Osasuna	0	(0)
1987–1989	Castellón	62	(27)
1989–1993	Betis	112	(50)
1993–1995	Granada	63	(31)
1995–1996	Benidorm	31	(15)
1996–1997	Getafe	37	(17)
1997	Écija	10	(2)
1998	Angers	16	(3)
Total		455	(195)

Managerial career
- 1999–2000: Coslada
- 2000: Mérida
- 2000–2001: Murcia
- 2001–2002: Tenerife
- 2003: Getafe
- 2003–2004: Alavés
- 2004–2005: Poli Ejido
- 2006–2010: Rayo Vallecano
- 2010–2013: Betis
- 2014: West Bromwich Albion
- 2014–2016: Betis
- 2017: Deportivo La Coruña
- 2019–2022: Las Palmas
- 2022–2023: Málaga
- 2023–2024: OFI
- 2024: Almería
- 2024: Tenerife
- 2025–2026: IR Tangier
- * Club domestic league appearances and goals

José "Pepe" Mel Pérez (born 28 February 1963) is a Spanish former professional footballer who played as a striker, currently a manager.

He amassed Segunda División totals of 215 matches and 78 goals over eight seasons, for Real Madrid Castilla, Castellón and Betis. He also played in La Liga with the last of those clubs.

Mel took up coaching in 1999, going on to be in charge of several teams, mainly Rayo Vallecano and Betis, leading the latter to the second-tier championship in 2011 and 2015. He also worked in England with West Bromwich Albion and Greece with OFI, being dismissed five times throughout his career.

== Playing career ==
=== Castellón and Betis ===
Born in Madrid, Mel started his career with Real Madrid, joining the club's youth system in 1974 at the age of 11 and playing alongside the likes of Emilio Butragueño and Míchel, although he never represented the first team, only competing at senior level with the reserves. In late 1987, after a very brief spell with Osasuna, he moved to Segunda División with Castellón where he played two years, helping the Valencian Community side to return to La Liga in his second season after an absence of seven years.

Mel enjoyed his best years at Real Betis, signing with the Andalusia team in 1989 and helping them to achieve promotion in his debut campaign whilst winning the Pichichi Trophy with 22 goals, one better than in the previous season at Castellón. He scored 14 times the following year, but suffered immediate relegation; his debut in the competition was on 2 September 1990, and he found the net in a 2–2 home draw against Sporting de Gijón.

=== Later career ===
Mel played his remaining years in the Segunda División B and also in France, with Granada – two years – Benidorm and Getafe, splitting his final season between Écija and Angers. He retired at the age of 35, with a Spanish second division tally of 215 games and 78 goals.

== Coaching career ==
=== Early years and Rayo ===
Mel started coaching one year after retiring, his first club being amateurs Coslada in the Community of Madrid. In 2001, after one year at Real Murcia in division two, he replaced Valencia-bound Rafael Benítez at the helm of Tenerife, having his first spell in the top flight as a coach and suffering relegation.

In the following four seasons, Mel worked in the second level, being sacked early into 2005–06 by Polideportivo Ejido. Shortly after, he dropped down a tier and moved to Rayo Vallecano, helping the Madrid club to return to the second division in his second year and subsequently leading it to fifth place, with chances of promotion until the last month of competition.

=== Betis ===
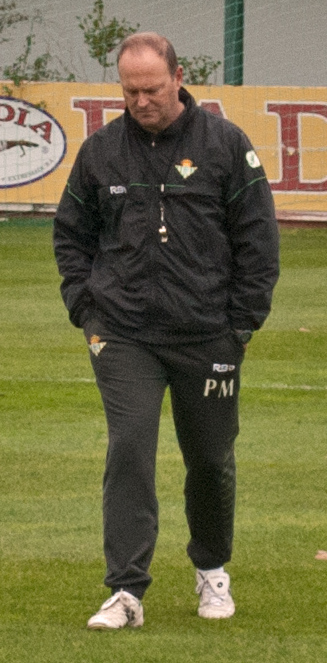
Mel training with Betis in December 2010

On 15 February 2010, after a string of poor results, Mel was dismissed by Rayo, being replaced by director of football Felipe Miñambres who helped the side to the 11th position. In the summer, he signed with former side Betis also in the second tier, leading the Verdiblancos back to the top flight in his first year.

Mel coached Betis to the seventh position in the 2012–13 campaign, with the subsequent qualification for the UEFA Europa League. He was relieved of his duties on 2 December 2013, however, after falling to a 4–0 derby loss at Sevilla and conceding a last-minute 2–2 home equaliser to Rayo Vallecano.

=== West Bromwich Albion ===
On 9 January 2014, Mel signed an 18-month contract with West Bromwich Albion of the Premier League. His first match in charge came 11 days later, a 1–1 home draw against Everton.

Mel obtained his first win in English football after seven games, with a 2–1 victory at Swansea City on 15 March 2014. On 12 May, one day after the end of the season where he led the Baggies to the 17th place, he left by mutual consent with a record of three wins from 17 games.

=== Return to Betis ===
Mel returned to former club Betis in December 2014, with a contract lasting until the end of the campaign. He was the April 2015 Segunda División Manager of the Month after his team won all their games, scoring 11 goals and conceding two. On 24 May, after only one loss in his tenure, the league was won as champions and promotion achieved with a 3–0 win over Alcorcón.

Mel was fired on 11 January 2016, with his team in 15th place following a poor run of form and also strained relationship.

=== Deportivo ===
On 27 February 2017, Mel was appointed at Deportivo de La Coruña until the end of the season, replacing the sacked Gaizka Garitano at a team two points above the relegation zone in the top division and winless in the new year. He was himself dismissed on 24 October, due to poor results.

=== Las Palmas ===
Mel was named manager of Las Palmas on 4 March 2019, replacing Paco Herrera who had been fired earlier the same day, and signed a contract until the end of the season. On 23 January 2022, he was relieved of his duties.

=== Málaga ===
On 21 September 2022, Mel joined Málaga also in the second division. He was sacked the following 25 January 2023, with the club still in the relegation places.

=== OFI ===
On 14 December 2023, Mel was appointed at OFI in the Super League Greece, signing a contract until the end of the campaign. In February 2024, however, following only one win in 12 matches and eight losses, the last being a 4–0 defeat to Olympiacos, he left by mutual agreement.

=== Almería ===
On 13 March 2024, Mel took over Almería back in his home country's top tier, becoming their third coach of the season after Vicente Moreno and Garitano. He achieved the only three wins in the league, not being able to move from the 20th and last position (shared with Granada); he left on 28 May after his link expired.

=== Tenerife return ===
On 16 September 2024, Mel returned to Tenerife on a one-year deal, replacing the dismissed Óscar Cano. He was himself fired on 23 December after just three victories in 16 matches, in spite of having renewed his link the month before.

== Outside football ==
Mel is also a novelist, having published three books, Liar, The Road to the Afterlife and The Test.

== Managerial statistics ==
As of match played 10 March 2026

Managerial record by team and tenure
Team	Nat	From	To	Record								Ref
Team	Nat	From	To	G	W	D	L	GF	GA	GD	Win %	Ref
Coslada	(Spain)	1 July 1999	30 June 2000	44	27	10	7	78	39	+39	61.36	
Mérida	(Spain)	30 June 2000	26 September 2000	4	3	1	0	10	4	+6	75.00	
Murcia	(Spain)	26 September 2000	27 June 2001	42	13	13	16	55	58	−3	30.95	
Tenerife	(Spain)	27 June 2001	18 February 2002	27	6	6	15	19	42	−23	22.22	
Getafe	(Spain)	21 January 2003	26 June 2003	23	8	8	7	26	28	−2	34.78	
Alavés	(Spain)	26 June 2003	30 June 2004	50	22	19	9	57	39	+18	44.00	
Poli Ejido	(Spain)	30 June 2004	14 November 2005	56	15	17	24	54	71	−17	26.79	
Rayo Vallecano	(Spain)	17 June 2006	15 February 2010	169	76	58	35	240	157	+83	44.97	
Betis	(Spain)	12 July 2010	2 December 2013	156	67	33	56	235	210	+25	42.95	
West Bromwich Albion	(England)	9 January 2014	12 May 2014	17	3	6	8	20	31	−11	17.65	
Betis	(Spain)	23 December 2014	11 January 2016	46	21	12	13	65	54	+11	45.65	
Deportivo La Coruña	(Spain)	27 February 2017	24 October 2017	24	6	7	11	27	40	−13	25.00	
Las Palmas	(Spain)	4 March 2019	23 January 2022	128	44	41	43	154	157	−3	34.38	
Málaga	(Spain)	21 September 2022	25 January 2023	20	3	10	7	16	20	−4	15.00	
OFI	(Greece)	14 December 2023	11 February 2024	12	1	3	8	7	24	−17	8.33	
Almería	(Spain)	13 March 2024	28 May 2024	10	3	2	5	16	16	+0	30.00	
Tenerife	(Spain)	16 September 2024	23 December 2024	16	3	5	8	13	22	−9	18.75	
IR Tangier	(Morocco)	2 December 2025	10 March 2026	7	1	2	4	4	8	−4	14.29	
Total				851	322	253	276	1,096	1,022	+74	37.84	—

== Honours ==
=== Player ===
Castellón

- Segunda División: 1988–89

=== Manager ===
Rayo Vallecano

- Segunda División B: 2007–08

Betis

- Segunda División: 2010–11, 2014–15

=== Individual ===
- Pichichi Trophy (Segunda División): 1989–90
- Segunda División Manager of the Month: April 2015
