= Oriol Alsina =

Spanish footballer and manager

Personal information
- Full name: Josep Oriol Alsina García
- Date of birth: 21 August 1967 (age 59)
- Place of birth: Arenys de Mar, Spain

Team information
- Current team: Terrassa FC (manager)

Senior career*
| Years | Team | Apps | (Gls) |
- Arenys Mar
- Rubí
- Vilassar Mar
- Balaguer
- Vidreres
- Sils
- Arbúcies
| –1996 | Llagostera | | |

Managerial career
- 1997–2000: Llagostera
- 2002–2004: Cassà B
- 2004–2013: Llagostera
- 2015–2017: Llagostera
- 2018–2023: Badalona Futur (Note: Llagostera changed name to Costa Brava in 2021, and then to Badalona Futur in 2022.)
- 2025–: Terrassa
- * Club domestic league appearances and goals

Josep Oriol Alsina García (born 21 August 1967) is a Spanish football manager and former player. He is the current manager of Terrassa.

== Playing career ==
Born in Arenys de Mar, Barcelona, Catalonia, Alsina only played regional football during his entire career, representing CF Arenys de Mar, UE Rubí, UE Vilassar de Mar, CF Vidreres, CF Sils, Arbúcies CF and UE Llagostera. He retired with the latter in 1996 at the age of 29, due to a knee injury.

== Managerial career ==
Alsina was appointed manager of his last club Llagostera in 1997, with the club in the ninth division. After two years at UD Cassà's reserves, he returned to the Blanquivermells in 2004.

Alsina was the manager during the club's impressive run, which consisted of six promotions in eight seasons. On 5 February 2013, he was replaced by Lluís Carrillo, after lacking the license to coach in Segunda División B, and was immediately named assistant and director of football.

On 6 June 2014, Alsina moved to neighbouring Girona FC along with Óscar Álvarez and Carrillo, after agreeing to a three-year deal. On 1 July, however, he left the club and subsequently returned to Llagostera.

On 21 October Carrillo and Alsina were named managers, after the dismissal of Santi Castillejo. After again not having the license, he was appointed assistant.

On 28 July 2015, Alsina was finally appointed at the helm of the main squad in Segunda División, after acquiring the license needed. His first professional match in charge occurred on 22 August, a 2–0 home loss against CA Osasuna, and he remained in charge for the remainder of the campaign, which ended in relegation.

On 10 May 2017, Alsina announced that he would be stepping down from his manager role. On 8 July of the following year, after the club suffered another drop, he was again appointed manager.

He remained in charge until 2023. The club had changed its name to UE Costa Brava in 2021 and to CF Badalona Futur in 2022.

He signed as the new manager of Terrassa FC on 29 October 2025.
