= Lluís Carrillo =

Spanish football manager (born 1971)

Personal information
- Full name: Lluís Carrillo Milán
- Date of birth: 22 February 1971 (age 55)
- Place of birth: Monistrol de Montserrat, Spain

Managerial career
- Years: Team
- 2008–2011: Llagostera (youth)
- 2011–2013: Llagostera (assistant)
- 2013–2014: Llagostera
- 2014–2015: Llagostera

Lluís Carrillo Milán (born 22 February 1971) is a Spanish football manager.

== Manager career ==
Born in Monistrol de Montserrat, Barcelona, Catalonia, Carrillo joined UE Llagostera in 2008, initially in charge of the youth setup. In the 2011 summer he was appointed assistant manager, behind Oriol Alsina.

Carillo became the club's manager in 2012, after profiting from Alsina's lack of managerial licensing. On 5 February 2013 he was appointed as full-time manager, and took the club to an impressive round of 32 defeat in the campaign's Copa del Rey.

Carrillo remained in charge for 2013–14, and led the club to a promotion to Segunda División for the first time ever. On 6 June 2014, however, he left along Alsina and Óscar Álvarez to Girona FC, being replaced by Santi Castillejo.

On 21 October Carrillo and Alsina returned to Llagostera, replacing fired Castillejo. He appeared in his first professional match five days later, a 1–1 away draw against CD Lugo.

On 5 March 2015, Carrillo received the Segunda División Manager of the Month award for February. In June, after taking the team to 9th in their debut professional season, his contract expired.

== Personal life ==
Carrillo's brother, Joan, is also a manager.
