= Jesús Serrano =

Jesús Serrano may refer to:

- Jesús Serrano (sport shooter) (born 1978), Spanish sport shooter
- Jesus Serrano (volleyball) (born 1994), Mexican volleyball player
- Jesús María Serrano (born 1973), Spanish football midfielder and coach
