= Quique Costas =

Spanish football player and manager (born 1947)

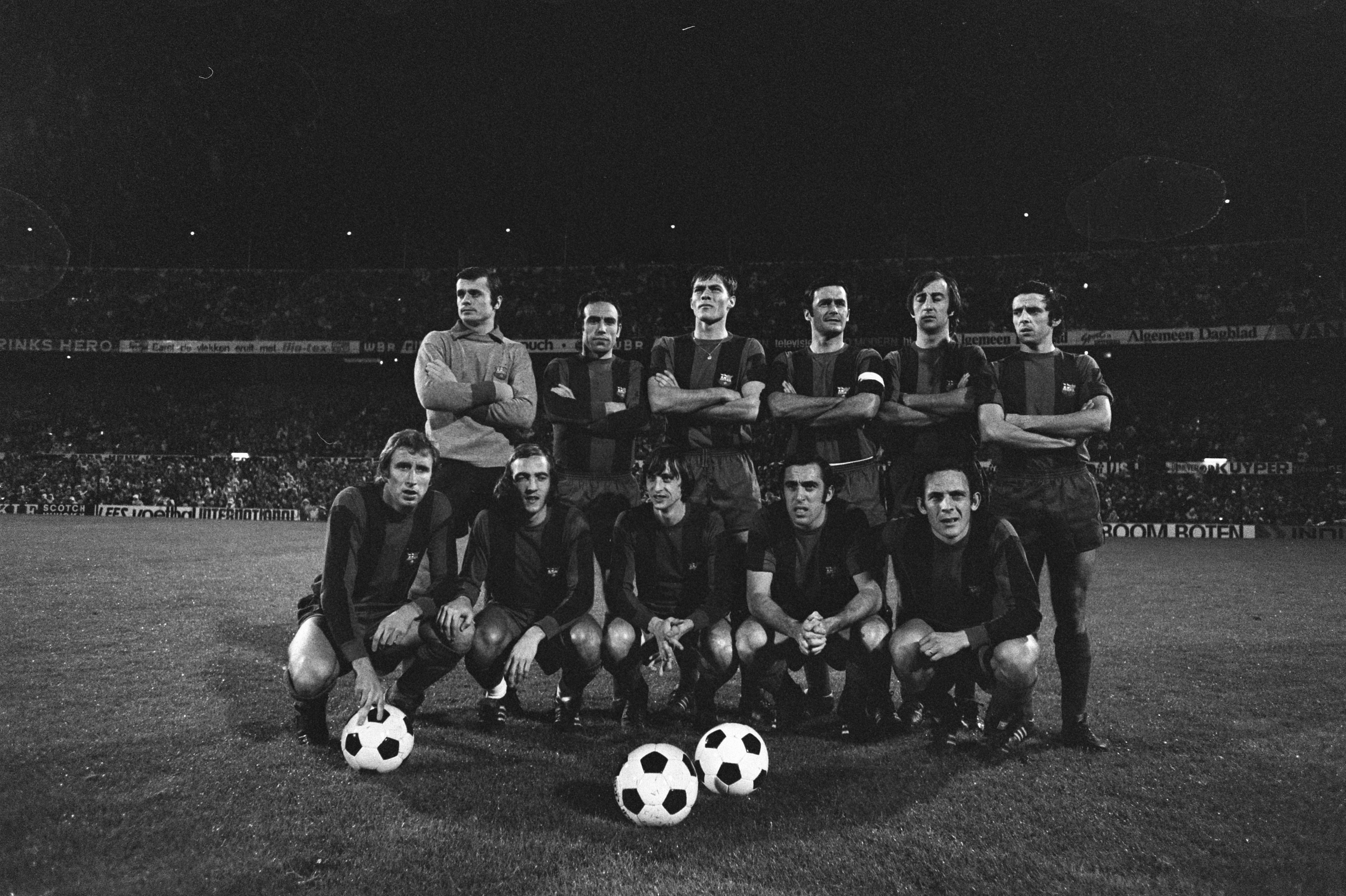
- Costas with Barcelona (back row, fifth from left) in 1974

Personal information
- Full name: Enrique Álvarez Costas
- Date of birth: 16 January 1947 (age 79)
- Place of birth: Vigo, Spain
- Height: 1.79 m (5 ft 10 in)
- Position: Defensive midfielder

Youth career
- Celta

Senior career*
| Years | Team | Apps | (Gls) |
| 1965–1971 | Celta | 169 | (11) |
| 1971–1980 | Barcelona | 170 | (3) |
| Total | | 339 | (14) |

International career
| 1965–1967 | Spain amateur | 5 | (1) |
| 1970–1975 | Spain | 13 | (0) |

Managerial career
- 1987–1989: Barcelona C
- 1989–1996: Barcelona B
- 2001–2003: Barcelona B
- 2005–2007: Barcelona B
- * Club domestic league appearances and goals

Enrique "Quique" Álvarez Costas (Spanish pronunciation: [ˈkike ˈkostas]; born 16 January 1947) is a Spanish former professional football defensive midfielder and manager.

He played 229 La Liga matches over the course of 11 seasons (nine goals), in representation of Celta and Barcelona.

Costas began a lengthy coaching career in the late 80s, mainly being in charge of Barcelona B.

== Club career ==
Born in Vigo, Galicia, Costas began his professional career with local club RC Celta de Vigo in 1965. He appeared in 26 Segunda División games in his first season, including both legs of the La Liga playoff promotion against CE Sabadell FC.

Costas was essential to the first team in the 1970–71 campaign, playing every minute as Celta finished sixth and qualified for the UEFA Cup for the first time in its history. In summer 1971, after 185 competitive appearances, he signed with fellow top-flight side FC Barcelona. Almost never an undisputed starter, he was still used regularly, and helped the Catalans to win the 1978–79 edition of the UEFA Cup Winners' Cup.

Costas took up coaching afterwards, eventually managing Barcelona's B side on three occasions. On one of them he coincided with his son Quique Álvarez, a La Masia youth product and also a defender, who went on to play with success for Villarreal CF; he had another son, Óscar, who occupied the same position and competed mainly in the second tier and the Segunda División B.

== International career ==
Costas earned 13 caps for Spain over a five-year period. His debut came on 11 February 1970, in a 2–0 friendly win over West Germany (90 minutes played).

Costas was not selected, however, for any major international tournament, as the country did not manage to reach any during that timeframe.

== Honours ==
Barcelona

- La Liga: 1973–74
- Copa del Rey: 1977–78
- UEFA Cup Winners' Cup: 1978–79
- Inter-Cities Fairs Cup: 1971
