= José Durán (Spanish footballer) =

Spanish footballer and manager

Personal information
- Full name: José Antonio Durán Rivas
- Date of birth: 27 June 1974 (age 52)
- Place of birth: Lugo, Spain

Senior career*
Years	Team	Apps	(Gls)
- Lugo

Managerial career
- Lugo (youth)
- 2004: Lugo
- 2006: Foz
- 2007–2008: Viveiro
- 2008–2010: Foz
- 2010–2016: Lugo (youth)
- 2016: Lugo
- 2016–2020: Polvorín
- 2021: Rupel Boom
- * Club domestic league appearances and goals

José Antonio Durán Rivas (born 27 June 1974) is a Spanish football manager and former player.

== Career ==
Born in Lugo, Galicia, Durán started his managerial career at the youth levels of hometown's CD Lugo, club he already represented as a player. In 2004, he was appointed manager of the first team in Tercera División, replacing fired Quique Prado, and managed to achieve 10 wins in 18 matches as his side missed out promotion by finishing sixth.

On 10 January 2006, Durán was appointed at the helm of CD Foz in the fifth level, and managed to finish 16th. On 26 June, however, he resigned after his side was relegated.

On 1 June 2007, Durán was named Viveiro CF manager. He was sacked on 4 June of the following year, and returned to his previous club Foz on 11 July.

On 21 June 2010, after narrowly missing out promotion to the fourth tier in his first campaign and finishing in a comfortable mid-table position in his second, Durán announced his resignment. He subsequently returned to Lugo and its youth setup, being a manager of the Juvenil squad.

On 25 February 2016, Durán was named manager of the Albivermellos, as a replacement to Luis Milla, until the end of the season. His first professional match in charge occurred three days later, a 3–1 Segunda División away loss against Real Zaragoza.

Despite losing his first match in charge, Durán achieved three wins and one draw during the month of March, which ensured him the Segunda División Manager of the Month award. He was relieved from his duties on 11 June 2016, after avoiding relegation, and was appointed in charge of the farm team SDC Polvorín shortly after.

On 31 July 2020, after taking the reserve side to the fourth division, Durán left Polvorín. On 17 October 2021, he moved abroad for the first time in his career to take over Belgian Third Division side K. Rupel Boom F.C., but was fired on 25 November.

== Managerial statistics ==
As of 8 March 2020

Managerial record by team and tenure
Team	From	To	Record					Ref.
Team	From	To	G	W	D	L	Win %	Ref.
Lugo	26 January 2004	30 June 2004	18	10	7	1	55.56	
Foz	10 January 2006	26 June 2006	20	3	4	13	15.00	
Viveiro	1 June 2007	4 June 2008	38	8	17	13	21.05	
Foz	11 July 2008	22 June 2010	76	29	22	25	38.16	
Lugo	25 February 2016	11 June 2016	16	5	3	8	31.25	
Polvorín	13 June 2016	31 July 2020	141	70	29	42	49.65	
Total			309	125	82	102	40.45	—
