= Quique Álvarez =

Spanish footballer (born 1975)

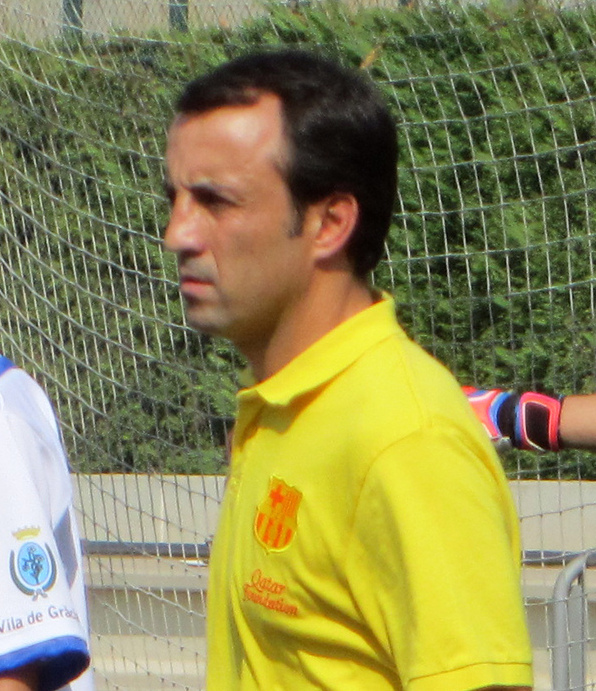
- Álvarez working with Barcelona in 2012

Personal information
- Full name: Enrique Álvarez Sanjuán
- Date of birth: 20 July 1975 (age 51)
- Place of birth: Vigo, Spain
- Height: 1.80 m (5 ft 11 in)
- Position: Centre-back

Team information
- Current team: Girona (manager)

Youth career
- 1992–1993: Barcelona

Senior career*
Years	Team	Apps	(Gls)
1993–1997	Barcelona B	78	(0)
1995–1998	Barcelona	1	(0)
1997–1998	→ Logroñés (loan)	16	(0)
1998–2000	Lleida	75	(3)
2000–2007	Villarreal	188	(5)
2007–2009	Recreativo	12	(0)
Total		370	(8)

International career
1995	Spain U21	1	(0)
1997	Spain U23	2	(0)

Managerial career
- 2009–2015: Barcelona U19 (assistant)
- 2015–2017: Barcelona U18
- 2017–2018: Villarreal (assistant)
- 2019–2020: Villarreal (assistant)
- 2021: Alavés (assistant)
- 2022–2024: Levante (assistant)
- 2024–2026: Girona B
- 2026–: Girona
- * Club domestic league appearances and goals

Enrique "Quique" Álvarez Sanjuán (Spanish pronunciation: [ˈkike ˈalβaɾeθ]; born 20 July 1975) is a Spanish former professional footballer who played as a central defender. He is the manager of Segunda División club Girona.

He appeared in 445 games in a 16-year senior career, 201 in La Liga. Having started out at Barcelona, where he had no impact for its first team – one match – he would be an important member of Villarreal's top-flight consolidation, representing the club for seven seasons.

== Playing career ==
Álvarez was born in Vigo, Galicia. Grown through the ranks of FC Barcelona, he played only one La Liga game for the Catalans in the 1995–96 season, then served a loan stint with CD Logroñés before being released, after which he joined Barça neighbours UE Lleida (both teams were in the Segunda División).

Álvarez made a name for himself during his spell at Villarreal CF, where he was team captain when a starter. Having made 250 competitive appearances – second-most for the club behind Argentine Rodolfo Arruabarrena– his role would diminish in the 2006–07 campaign however, as Villarreal finished fifth (only 15 matches).

In July 2007, Álvarez joined Recreativo de Huelva, where his season would be constantly bothered by injuries. In one of his few league appearances, on 1 March 2008, he was sent off for a dangerous challenge on Real Madrid's Arjen Robben after just six minutes on the pitch (the former was brought on in the 64'), during a 2–3 home loss. In 2008–09 he only took part in one league game for already doomed Recre, a 2–1 defeat at Sporting de Gijón in the last round, and was subsequently released.

== Coaching career ==
Retired at 34, Álvarez moved into coaching, starting with Barcelona's Juvenil A. He returned to Villarreal on 26 September 2017, as part of his former teammate Javier Calleja's staff; the pair were fired on 10 December 2018, being reinstated the following 29 January after the dismissal of Luis García.

Álvarez and Calleja later worked together at Deportivo Alavés and Levante UD. On 28 June 2024, he was named manager of Girona FC's reserves in the Tercera Federación, with his brother acting as his assistant.

On 22 June 2026, Álvarez was promoted to Girona's first team following the departure of Míchel.

== Personal life ==
Álvarez's father, Quique Costas, also a footballer, appeared professionally for RC Celta de Vigo and Barcelona. He later became a manager, coinciding with his son on one occasion.

Álvarez's younger brother, Óscar, who occupied the same position as his sibling, played mainly in the second tier and the Segunda División B.

== Managerial statistics ==
As of match played 22 November 2026

Managerial record by team and tenure
Team	Nat	From	To	Record								Ref
Team	Nat	From	To	G	W	D	L	GF	GA	GD	Win %	Ref
Girona B	(Spain)	28 June 2024	22 June 2026	75	32	24	19	114	84	+30	42.67	
Girona	(Spain)	22 June 2026	present	16	9	3	4	28	14	+14	56.25	
Total				91	41	27	23	142	98	+44	45.05	—

== Honours ==
Villarreal

- UEFA Intertoto Cup: 2003, 2004
