= Alexis Egea =

Spanish footballer

Alexis
Personal information
- Full name: Alexis Egea Acame
- Date of birth: 25 December 1987 (age 38)
- Place of birth: Alicante, Spain
- Height: 1.84 m (6 ft 0 in)
- Position: Centre back

Team information
- Current team: Víkingur Ólafsvík

Senior career*
Years	Team	Apps	(Gls)
2008–2011	Torrellano Illice		
2011–2012	Elche B		
2013	Altamira	7	(0)
2013–2015	Torrevieja	60	(0)
2015	Universidad	3	(0)
2016	Víkingur Ólafsvík	18	(2)
2016–2017	Almoradí	12	(0)
2017–	Víkingur Ólafsvík	17	(0)
- * Club domestic league appearances and goals as of 18 February 2018

Alexis Egea Acame (born 25 December 1987), simply known as Alexis, is a Spanish professional footballer who plays for CF Intercity as a central defender.

== Club career ==
Born in Alicante, Valencia, Egea made his senior debuts with Torrellano Illice CF in the 2008–09 campaign, in the regional leagues. In 2011, he appeared during the whole pre-season with Elche CF, being later assigned to the reserves.

Alexis left the Franjiverdes in the 2012 summer, and signed for Estudiantes de Altamira on 3 January of the following year. He made his professional debut on the 12th, starting in a 3–3 away draw against Club Necaxa.

On 10 August 2013, Alexis returned to Spain, signing a one-year deal with CD Torrevieja. On 13 May 2015 he moved to Guatemalan club Universidad SC, and subsequently represented Víkingur Ólafsvík (two stints) and CD Almoradí.

== Personal life ==
Alexis' father Sergio, was also a footballer and a defender. His brother, Lauren, is a forward.
