= Lauren Egea =

Spanish professional footballer

Personal information
- Full name: Lauren Egea Acame
- Date of birth: 8 January 1996 (age 30)
- Place of birth: Alicante, Spain
- Height: 1.84 m (6 ft 1/2 in)
- Position: Centre back

Team information
- Current team: Dos Hermanas

Youth career
- 2007–2014: Hércules
- 2014–2015: Espanyol
- 2016–2017: UNAM

Senior career*
Years	Team	Apps	(Gls)
2014	Hércules	2	(0)
2015–2016	Espanyol B	0	(0)
2015–2016	→ Cornellà (loan)	4	(0)
2016	Murcia B	14	(2)
2017–2018	UNAM	0	(0)
2017–2018	→ Zacatepec (loan)	0	(0)
2018–2019	Alicante	27	(1)
2019–2020	Praviano	8	(0)
2020	Murada	1	(0)
2020	Athletic Torrellano	0	(0)
2020–2021	Salamanca B	26	(1)
2021	Jove Español	11	(0)
2022	Callosa Deportiva	15	(2)
2022–2024	Soneja	55	(10)
2024–2025	Lebrijana	27	(10)
2025–	Dos Hermanas	9	(3)
- * Club domestic league appearances and goals as of 9 November 2025

Lauren Egea Acame (born 8 January 1996) is a Spanish professional footballer who plays for Tercera Federación club Dos Hermanas as a central defender.

== Personal life ==
Egea's father Sergio and his brother Alexis are also footballers and defenders. The former is retired, and is currently a coach.

== Professional career ==
Egea was born in Alicante, Valencia. He joined Hércules CF's youth setup in 2007, aged 11.

On 12 April 2014, while still a junior, Egea played his first match as a professional, replacing Aitor Fernández in the 79th minute of a 1–2 loss at UD Las Palmas in the Segunda División. He appeared in two matches during the campaign, which ended in relegation.

On 7 August 2014 Egea moved to RCD Espanyol, initially assigned to the Juvenil squad. On 15 August of the following year, he was loaned to Segunda División B side UE Cornellà for one year.

After being rarely used, Egea rescinded his contract and moved to Tercera División club Real Murcia Imperial. He moved to Mexico in January 2017, joining Club Universidad Nacional's reserve side as his father was in charge of the first team.

While in Mexico, Egea switched his position from a forward to a central defender, and spent the 2017–18 season on loan at Club Atlético Zacatepec, but failed to appear for the club. He returned to Spain in 2018, and subsequently resumed his career in the lower leagues, representing CFI Alicante, CD Praviano, CD Murada, Athletic Club Torrellano and Salamanca CF UDS B.
