= Sabeco =

Spanish supermarket chain

SABECO is a Spanish supermarket chain. It was formed in 1960 in Zaragoza. The first name of the company was Supermercados Aragoneses S.A. SABECO became the company's official name a few years later. SABECO was the first to establish self-service supermarkets in Spain.

== History ==
After the Zaragoza shop had become a success, the company began establishing supermarkets in the urban areas of Spain's largest cities. Later, SABECO was integrated in the French distribution group Docks de France, which was purchased by the Auchan Group in 1996.

As of 2006, SABECO operates 123 supermarkets and hypermarkets, 2 7 D shops, 11 petrol stations and 100 Aro Rojo associated establishments. SABECO employs approximately 6,000 people.

In 2016, Auchan Retail Spain was established to bring together all the centers (Alcampo hypermarkets and Simply supermarkets) of the group in Spain.

In 2020, Auchan Retail Spain was absorbed by its own subsidiary, Alcampo, becoming the group's parent company in Spain.

On April 1, 2021, Alcampo, S.A. absorbed Supermarkets Sabeco, S.A.U.
