= Joan Carrillo =

Spanish footballer and manager

Personal information
- Full name: Joan Antoni Carrillo Milán
- Date of birth: 8 September 1968 (age 58)
- Place of birth: Monistrol de Montserrat, Spain
- Height: 1.75 m (5 ft 9 in)
- Position: Midfielder

Senior career*
Years	Team	Apps	(Gls)
1988–1989	Lloret		
1989–1991	Girona	39	(2)
1991–1994	Andorra	88	(4)
1994–1996	Espanyol B	36	(0)
1996–1997	Poli Ejido	37	(2)
1997–1998	Palamós	32	(0)
1998–2001	Vilassar Mar		

Managerial career
- Espanyol (youth)
- 2006–2007: Girona
- 2008–2009: Espanyol B (assistant)
- 2009–2011: Espanyol (assistant)
- 2011–2014: Videoton (assistant)
- 2014–2015: Videoton
- 2015: Almería
- 2016–2017: Hajduk Split
- 2018: Wisła Kraków
- 2019–2020: Fehérvár
- 2020: AEK Larnaca
- 2021–2022: Debrecen
- 2023: Lugo
- * Club domestic league appearances and goals

Joan Antoni Carrillo Milán (born 8 September 1968) is a Spanish retired footballer who played as a midfielder, and later became a manager.

== Playing career ==
Born in Monistrol de Montserrat, Barcelona, Catalonia, Carrillo made his debuts as a senior with CF Lloret, and went on to appear for Girona FC, FC Andorra, RCD Espanyol B, Polideportivo Ejido, Palamós CF and UE Vilassar de Mar. With the latter he retired in 2001, after appearing regularly in both Segunda División B and Tercera División.

== Managerial career ==
Shortly after his retirement, Carrillo started working at RCD Espanyol for the club's youth setup, first team and sportive area. On 3 July 2006 he was appointed Girona FC manager, with the club in the fourth level.

On 5 February 2007 Carrillo was sacked, with the Albirrojos alleging poor performances. He subsequently returned to Espanyol, being assigned as the reserves' assistant.

Carrillo was appointed RCD Espanyol assistant manager in July 2009, behind Mauricio Pochettino. In June 2011 he joined the backroom staff of Paulo Sousa by becoming the assistant manager of Hungarian club Videoton FC.

On 6 June 2014 Carrilllo was appointed at the helm of the club, replacing fired José Gomes. Roughly a year later, despite being crowned champions, he was dismissed.

On 19 October 2015 Carrillo was named UD Almería manager, replacing fired Sergi Barjuán. He was relieved from his duties on 20 December, with the club being in a winless run of 15 matches.

Carrillo was appointed as the new HNK Hajduk Split manager in December 2016. After finishing third in his first season, he was sacked on 6 November 2017 after a 2–3 loss to bottom side NK Rudeš.

On 11 December 2017, Carrillo replaced fellow Spaniard Kiko Ramírez at the helm of Wisła Kraków. He left by mutual accord the following June after taking them to sixth in the Ekstraklasa.

On 25 November 2019 he was appointed as the manager of the Nemzeti Bajnokság I club Fehérvár FC after Marko Nikolić was dismissed by the club due to a 1–3 home defeat against Puskás Akadémia FC at MOL Aréna Sóstó. He left the club in July of the following year, subsequently taking over Cypriot side AEK Larnaca FC in September but being dismissed in November.

On 8 November 2021, he was appointed as the manager of Nemzeti Bajnokság I club, Debreceni VSC. On 1 February 2023, he returned to Spain and its second division after being appointed manager of CD Lugo, but was sacked on 6 March after five matches without a win.

== Personal life ==
Carrillo's brother, Lluís, is also a manager.

== Managerial statistics ==
As of match played 5 March 2023

Managerial record by team and tenure
Team	Nat	From	To	Record								Ref
Team	Nat	From	To	G	W	D	L	GF	GA	GD	Win %	Ref
Girona	(Spain)	3 July 2006	5 February 2007	26	13	6	7	40	34	+6	50.00	
Videoton	(Hungary)	6 June 2014	4 June 2015	49	36	6	7	118	34	+84	73.47	
Almería	(Spain)	19 October 2015	21 December 2015	11	0	6	5	7	13	−6	0.00	
Hajduk Split	(Croatia)	5 December 2016	6 November 2017	41	22	11	8	75	38	+37	53.66	
Wisła Kraków	(Poland)	1 January 2018	12 June 2018	16	6	6	4	21	16	+5	37.50	
Fehérvár	(Hungary)	25 November 2019	6 July 2020	27	13	10	4	40	20	+20	48.15	
AEK Larnaca	(Cyprus)	21 September 2020	24 November 2020	7	4	0	3	19	6	+13	57.14	
Debreceni	(Hungary)	12 November 2021	27 June 2022	21	7	5	9	20	29	−9	33.33	
Lugo	(Spain)	1 February 2023	6 March 2023	5	0	2	3	1	8	−7	0.00	
Total				203	101	52	50	341	198	+143	49.75	—

== Honours ==
=== Manager ===
Videoton

- Hungarian Premier League: 2014–15
