= Óscar Álvarez (footballer, born 1977) =

Spanish footballer

Personal information
- Full name: Óscar Álvarez Sanjuán
- Date of birth: 9 June 1977 (age 49)
- Place of birth: Barcelona, Spain
- Height: 1.82 m (5 ft 11 1/2 in)
- Position: Centre-back

Team information
- Current team: Girona (assistant)

Youth career
- Barcelona

Senior career*
Years	Team	Apps	(Gls)
1994–1997	Barcelona C	32	(2)
1995–1999	Barcelona B	74	(2)
1999–2002	Oviedo	35	(1)
2000–2001	→ Lleida (loan)	24	(2)
2002–2005	Tenerife	31	(1)
2005–2007	Gimnàstic	4	(0)
2007–2008	Orihuela	53	(1)
2008–2010	Girona	9	(1)
2010–2011	Hospitalet	8	(0)
2011–2014	Llagostera	75	(2)
Total		345	(12)

Managerial career
- 2015–2017: Llagostera (assistant)
- 2017–2018: Llagostera
- 2018–2019: Llagostera (assistant)
- 2019–2020: Valencia (assistant)
- 2020–2023: Badalona Futur (Note: Club was named UE Costa Brava during the 2021–22 season, and UE Llagostera in the 2020–21 season.) (assistant)
- 2024–2026: Girona B (assistant)
- 2026–: Girona (assistant)
- * Club domestic league appearances and goals

Óscar Álvarez Sanjuán (born 9 June 1977) is a Spanish former professional footballer who played as a central defender. He is the assistant manager of Segunda División club Girona.

== Playing career ==
Born in Barcelona, Catalonia, Álvarez finished his youth career with local FC Barcelona, going on to feature for its C and B teams until the age of 22. He later signed with Real Oviedo, making his La Liga debut on 16 October 1999 by coming in as a late substitute in a 2–2 away draw against Real Madrid.

After playing for UE Lleida and CD Tenerife in the Segunda División, Álvarez joined Gimnàstic de Tarragona of the same league in July 2005. In his only season, he contributed only 524 minutes in all competitions, but achieved promotion.

Deemed surplus to requirements by Nàstic in the summer of 2006, and subsequently being left out of the main squad, Álvarez signed with Orihuela CF of Segunda División B in mid-January 2007. He returned to the second division two years later with Girona FC but, after two seasons marked by injury, he moved back to the league below with CE L'Hospitalet.

Álvarez signed for UE Llagostera also in his native region midway through the 2010–11 season, winning promotion from Tercera División and going on to play several years with the club in the third tier.

== Coaching career ==
Álvarez began working as a manager with his last team, as assistant to Oriol Alsina. He was promoted to head coach for the 2017–18 campaign, which ended in relegation from division three.

In September 2019, Álvarez accepted an offer from former Barcelona teammate Albert Celades to be part of his staff. Eleven months later, he returned to Llagostera still under Alsina.

== Personal life ==
Álvarez's older brother, Quique, was also a footballer and a stopper, who represented mainly Villarreal CF. Their father Quique Costas was a midfielder, and played professionally for RC Celta de Vigo, Barcelona and the Spain national team.
