= Juan Manuel Pavón =

Spanish footballer and manager

Juanma Pavón
Personal information
- Full name: Juan Manuel Pavón Domínguez
- Date of birth: 15 February 1976 (age 50)
- Place of birth: Huelva, Spain
- Height: 1.81 m (5 ft 11 1/2 in)
- Position: Midfielder

Team information
- Current team: Lincoln Red Imps (manager)

Youth career
- Recreativo

Senior career*
Years	Team	Apps	(Gls)
1995–2002	Recreativo	70	(2)
1995–1996	→ Ayamonte (loan)		
1998–1999	→ Ceuta (loan)	7	(1)
2002–2003	Algeciras	54	(2)
2003–2004	Badajoz	21	(0)
2004–2005	Alcalá	32	(0)
2006–2007	Portuense	5	(0)
2007–2009	Ayamonte	30	(1)
Total		219	(6)

Managerial career
- 2009–2012: Recreativo B (assistant)
- 2012–2015: Recreativo (youth)
- 2015: Recreativo
- 2015: Recreativo (assistant)
- 2015–2016: Recreativo B
- 2016–2017: Recreativo
- 2017–2018: Pobla Mafumet
- 2018–2021: Cádiz B
- 2021–2022: Villanovense
- 2022–2024: San Roque Lepe
- 2024: Atlético Paso
- 2026–: Lincoln Red Imps
- * Club domestic league appearances and goals

Juan Manuel 'Juanma' Pavón Domínguez (born 15 February 1976) is a Spanish retired footballer who played as a midfielder, and is the current manager of Gibraltar Football League club Lincoln Red Imps.

== Club career ==
Born in Huelva, Andalusia, Pavón finished his formation at Recreativo de Huelva, and made his senior debuts while on loan at Ayamonte CF in 1995. He was promoted to the main squad in Segunda División B in the following year by manager Joaquín Caparrós, appearing regularly.

In the 1998 summer Pavón was loaned to AD Ceuta, also in the third level. He returned to Recre after the expiry of his loan, and despite appearing sparingly for the former, was included in the first team and made his debut as a professional on 7 November 1999, coming on as a late substitute in a 0–2 away loss against Levante UD in the Segunda División.

On 8 November 2001 Pavón scored the first ever goal of Estadio Nuevo Colombino, and also netted the second in a 3–0 win against Newcastle United. Two months later, however, he moved to third level's Algeciras CF, alleging lack of match experience.

Pavón subsequently resumed his career in the third division but also in Tercera División, representing CD Badajoz, CD Alcalá, Racing Club Portuense and Ayamonte. He retired with the latter in 2009, aged 33.

== Post-playing career ==
After his retirement Pavón became Carlos Ríos' assistant at Recreativo de Huelva B. In 2012, he was appointed manager of the club's Juvenil squad.

On 10 February 2015, Pavón was named manager of the main squad, replacing fired José Luis Oltra. On 24 March, despite only suffering one defeat in six games, he was replaced by José Dominguez but remained in the first team, being appointed assistant manager.

Subsequently, Pavón was in charge of the reserves until October 2016, as he was appointed manager of the first team.

On 25 October 2017, Pavón was named CF Pobla de Mafumet manager.

On 19 May 2026, Pavón was appointed head coach of Gibraltar Football League champions Lincoln Red Imps.

== Managerial statistics ==
As of 23 September 2024

Managerial record by team and tenure
Team	Nat.	From	To	Record								Ref
Team	Nat.	From	To	G	W	D	L	GF	GA	GD	Win %	Ref
Recreativo	(Spain)	10 February 2015	24 March 2015	6	1	4	1	5	5	+0	16.67	
Recreativo B	(Spain)	1 July 2015	25 October 2016	44	27	6	11	78	47	+31	61.36	
Recreativo	(Spain)	25 October 2016	12 July 2017	28	8	13	7	28	30	−2	28.57	
Pobla Mafumet	(Spain)	25 October 2017	16 June 2018	27	12	8	7	28	20	+8	44.44	
Cádiz B	(Spain)	10 July 2018	14 February 2021	88	39	26	23	87	60	+27	44.32	
Villanovense	(Spain)	15 June 2021	14 March 2022	26	11	5	10	30	21	+9	42.31	
San Roque Lepe	(Spain)	11 July 2022	12 June 2024	78	27	22	29	85	79	+6	34.62	
Atlético Paso	(Spain)	1 July 2024	23 September 2024	4	0	1	3	1	6	−5	0.00	
Total				301	125	85	91	342	268	+74	41.53	—
