= Sergio Egea =

Argentine footballer and manager

Personal information
- Full name: Sergio Horacio Egea Rueda
- Date of birth: 21 September 1957 (age 69)
- Place of birth: Necochea, Argentina
- Position: Centre back

Youth career
- Cruz Necochea
- Estudiantes

Senior career*
Years	Team	Apps	(Gls)
1977–1978	Lusitano		
1978–1979	Hércules B		
1979–1980	Deportivo La Coruña	0	(0)
1980–1981	Elche	18	(0)
1982–1983	Recreativo	0	(0)
1983–1984	Barbastro		
1984–1985	Orihuela	12	(0)
1985–1991	Novelda		

Managerial career
- 1989–1990: Sax
- 1990: Hércules (youth)
- 1990–1991: Villena
- 1991–1995: Pinoso
- 1995–1997: Real Madrid B
- 1997–1998: Toledo
- 1998: Hércules
- 1999–2000: Valladolid B
- 2001–2005: Pumas (assistant)
- 2006: Necaxa (assistant)
- 2006–2008: Mexico (assistant)
- 2009: Almería (assistant)
- 2012–2013: Altamira
- 2014: Eldense
- 2014–2016: Oviedo
- 2017: Pumas (interim)
- 2019: Oviedo
- 2019–2020: Xelajú
- 2020: Salamanca
- 2023–2024: La Nucía
- * Club domestic league appearances and goals

Sergio Horacio Egea Rueda (born 21 September 1957) is a retired Argentine footballer who played as a central defender, and is a current manager.

== Playing career ==
Born in Necochea, Egea graduated from Estudiantes de La Plata's youth setup, after a stint with Cruz de Necochea. He made his debuts as a senior with South Africa's Lusitano FC, before moving to Spain.

In Spain, Egea represented Hércules CF B, Elche CF, Recreativo de Huelva, UD Barbastro, Orihuela Deportiva CF and Novelda CF, retiring with the latter in 1989.

== Managerial career ==
Immediately after retiring Egea took up coaching, starting with UDF Sax. In 1995, he was appointed Real Madrid Castilla manager, leading the club to fourth position during his first season.

After another stint at CD Toledo, Hércules CF and Real Valladolid B, Egea started working with Hugo Sánchez, being his assistant at Pumas, Club Necaxa, the Mexico national football team and UD Almería, only leaving in 2009.

On 23 April 2012 Egea was named Estudiantes de Altamira manager. He was sacked on 4 March of the following year, after a 0–2 home defeat against Lobos de la BUAP.

On 13 February 2014 Egea returned to Spain, being appointed at the helm of CD Eldense. After winning promotion from Tercera División with the side, he was named Real Oviedo manager on 6 July.

On 13 June 2015, after being crowned champions of Segunda División B and taking the side back to Segunda División after a 12-year absence, Egea renewed his contract with the Asturians for a further year. On 14 March of the following year, despite his side being third-placed, he resigned alleging "personal reasons".

On 23 August 2017, Egea was named interim manager of Pumas, but stepped down in October. On 22 April 2019, he returned to Oviedo in the place of departed Juan Antonio Anquela, but was dismissed on 15 September after only one point in the five matches of the new season.

== Personal life ==
Egea's sons, Lauren and Alexis, are both also footballers. The former is a forward, while the latter is also a defender.

== Managerial statistics ==
As of match played 17 December 2023

Managerial record by team and tenure
Team	Nat	From	To	Record					Ref.
Team	Nat	From	To	G	W	D	L	Win %	Ref.
Sax	(Spain)	1 July 1989	30 June 1990	38	10	8	20	26.32	
Villena	(Spain)	2 September 1990	30 June 1991	34	24	8	2	70.59	
Pinoso	(Spain)	1 July 1991	30 June 1995	170	82	55	33	48.24	
Real Madrid Castilla	(Spain)	1 July 1995	10 February 1997	60	24	15	21	40.00	
Toledo	(Spain)	1 July 1997	23 June 1998	46	15	15	16	32.61	
Hércules	(Spain)	23 June 1998	19 October 1998	10	2	2	6	20.00	
Valladolid B	(Spain)	7 December 1999	30 June 2000	22	5	6	11	22.73	
Altamira	(Mexico)	23 April 2012	4 March 2013	34	8	9	17	23.53	
Eldense	(Spain)	13 February 2014	6 July 2014	20	9	4	7	45.00	
Oviedo	(Spain)	6 July 2014	14 March 2016	77	40	21	16	51.95	
Pumas (interim)	(Mexico)	23 August 2017	4 October 2017	7	1	1	5	14.29	
Oviedo	(Spain)	22 April 2019	15 September 2019	12	3	2	7	25.00	
Xelajú	(Guatemala)	18 November 2019	30 June 2020	18	4	8	6	22.22	
Salamanca	(Spain)	14 July 2020	23 November 2020	6	1	0	5	16.67	
La Nucía	(Spain)	13 December 2023	5 January 2024	1	0	0	1	0.00	
Career Total				555	228	154	173	41.08	—

== Honours ==
- Segunda División B: 2014–15
- Segunda División Manager of the Month: December 2015
