= Txus Serrano =

Spanish retired footballer (born 1973)

Personal information
- Full name: Jesús María Serrano Eugui
- Date of birth: 29 April 1973 (age 53)
- Place of birth: Pamplona, Spain
- Height: 1.79 m (5 ft 10 1/2 in)
- Position: Midfielder

Team information
- Current team: Sabadell (assistant)

Senior career*
Years	Team	Apps	(Gls)
1992–1995	Osasuna B	109	(12)
1995–1996	Numancia	32	(2)
1996–1998	San Pedro	69	(5)
1998–1999	Poli Almería	42	(6)
1999–2007	Gimnàstic	214	(15)
Total		466	(40)

Managerial career
- 2013–: Sabadell (assistant)
- 2015: Sabadell (interim)
- * Club domestic league appearances and goals

Jesús María "Txus" Serrano Eugui (born 29 April 1973) is a Spanish retired footballer who played as a midfielder, and the current assistant manager of CE Sabadell FC.

He represented mainly Gimnàstic during a 15-year senior career, representing for the club in all three major levels and appearing in 221 competitive games.

== Playing career ==
Born in Pamplona, Navarre, Serrano started his career with local CA Osasuna B, appearing in two third division seasons with the team. In the summer of 1995 he signed with another side in that level, CD Numancia, and remained there for the following campaigns, representing UD San Pedro and CP Almería.

In 1999–2000, Serrano joined another club in division three, Gimnàstic de Tarragona, achieving promotion to the second tier in his second year but being immediately relegated (14 league appearances from the player in the latter season). In 2005–06 he helped to another promotion, now to La Liga, but his input in the competition consisted of two matches – 29 minutes against Sevilla FC (1–2 away loss) and 90 against Recreativo de Huelva (1–1 at home)– as the Catalans went on to rank 20th and last; he subsequently retired from football, aged 34.

== Coaching career ==
Serrano stayed with Nàstic after his retirement, working as a scout for the club. In early November 2011, after the departure of Juan Carlos Oliva and his assistant Ismael Mariani, he joined new boss Jorge D'Alessandro's coaching staff.

On 10 July 2013, Serrano was named assistant at CE Sabadell FC. He renewed his contract on 9 June of the following year, and was appointed interim manager on 5 February 2015 as a replacement for Álex García who resigned; his tenure ended five days later, after the appointment of Juan Carlos Mandiá.
