= Pablo Machín =

Spanish footballer and manager

Personal information
- Full name: Pablo Machín Díez
- Date of birth: 7 April 1975 (age 51)
- Place of birth: Soria, Spain
- Height: 1.82 m (5 ft 11 1/2 in)
- Position: Right-back

Team information
- Current team: Cerezo Osaka (manager)

Youth career
- Numancia

Senior career*
Years	Team	Apps	(Gls)
1993–1998	Numancia B		
1993–1994	Numancia	5	(0)

Managerial career
- 2006–2007: Numancia B
- 2011–2013: Numancia
- 2014–2018: Girona
- 2018–2019: Sevilla
- 2019: Espanyol
- 2020: Qingdao Huanghai
- 2020–2021: Alavés
- 2021: Al-Ain
- 2021–2022: Al-Raed
- 2022–2023: Elche
- 2023–2024: Apollon Limassol
- 2024–2025: Umm Salal SC
- 2026–: Cerezo Osaka
- * Club domestic league appearances and goals

Pablo Machín Díez (Spanish pronunciation: [ˈpaβlo maˈtʃin ˈdi.eθ]; born 7 April 1975) is a Spanish football manager and former player who played as a right-back. He is the current manager of J1 League club Cerezo Osaka.

== Playing career ==
Born in Soria, Machín was a Numancia youth graduate. Despite making five first team appearances during the 1993–94 season in Segunda División B, his spell at the club was mainly associated with the reserves until 1998, when a severe knee injury forced his retirement at the age of just 23.

== Coaching career ==
In 2000, he returned to Numancia, being assigned to its youth setup, and was promoted to the B-side in Tercera División in 2006; after leading the club to the play-offs, he was appointed as the main squad's assistant in the summer of 2007.

On 30 May 2011, Machín was appointed as first-team coach in Segunda División, replacing the fired Juan Carlos Unzué. After keeping them in the league for the following two seasons, he left the Rojillos.

Machín replaced fired Javi López at the helm of Girona on 9 March 2014. After an impressive 2014–15 campaign, which his side finished third but failed to gain promotion, he signed a two-year contract extension until 2018.

On 17 August 2017, after achieving promotion to La Liga, Machín extended his contract until 2019. He led the club to an impressive tenth position, only seven points shy of a European competition spot; highlights included a 6–0 home routing of Las Palmas.

Machín was appointed as Sevilla coach on 28 May 2018, signing a two-year contract with the club. The following 15 March, he was sacked after being knocked out of the UEFA Europa League round of 16 by Slavia Prague the previous day.

On 7 October 2019, Machín was appointed as manager of Espanyol in the top tier for two years, replacing fired David Gallego. He himself was sacked on 22 December, with the team in last place.

On 22 July 2020, Machín was appointed as manager of Chinese Super League side Qingdao Huanghai, but left the club eight days after his appointment, for personal reasons. On 5 August, he replaced Juan Muñiz at the helm of Alavés in the top tier, but was himself dismissed on 12 January 2021.

On 31 January 2021, Machín was named new manager of Saudi club Al-Ain. He moved five months later to Al-Raed, in the same country. On 26 January 2022, Machín was sacked by Al-Raed. They sat in eighth place at the time of the sacking, eight points clear of the relegation zone.

On 17 November 2022, Machín replaced Jorge Almirón at the helm of Elche, becoming their third manager of the season. He was himself dismissed the following 20 March, with the club in the last position.

On 26 December 2023, Machín was appointed as head coach of Cypriot First Division club Apollon Limassol.

On 3 July 2026, Cerezo Osaka appointed Machín as the new manager.

== Managerial statistics ==
As of match played 24 January 2025

Managerial record by team and tenure
Team	Nat	From	To	Record								Ref
Team	Nat	From	To	G	W	D	L	GF	GA	GD	Win %	Ref
Numancia B	(Spain)	1 July 2006	30 June 2007	42	21	15	6	61	36	+25	50.00	
Numancia	(Spain)	30 June 2011	11 June 2013	87	28	29	30	109	112	−3	32.18	
Girona	(Spain)	9 March 2014	28 May 2018	189	83	50	56	255	197	+58	43.92	
Sevilla	(Spain)	28 May 2018	15 March 2019	50	26	9	15	97	59	+38	52.00	
Espanyol	(Spain)	7 October 2019	23 December 2019	15	4	3	8	19	23	−4	26.67	
Alavés	(Spain)	5 August 2020	12 January 2021	20	6	6	8	19	23	−4	30.00	
Al-Ain	(Saudi Arabia)	31 January 2021	25 May 2021	14	2	4	8	14	30	−16	14.29	
Al-Raed	(Saudi Arabia)	19 June 2021	26 January 2022	19	7	3	9	25	29	−4	36.84	
Elche	(Spain)	17 November 2022	20 March 2023	14	3	3	8	12	21	−9	21.43	
Apollon Limassol	(Cyprus)	26 December 2023	28 June 2024	28	13	9	6	46	26	+20	46.43	
Umm Salal SC	(Qatar)	25 November 2024	27 January 2025	4	1	0	3	6	12	−6	25.00	
Cerezo Osaka	(Japan)	3 July 2026	Present	0	0	0	0	0	0	+0	—	
Total				482	194	131	157	663	568	+95	40.25	—
