= Paco Herrera =

Spanish football player and manager

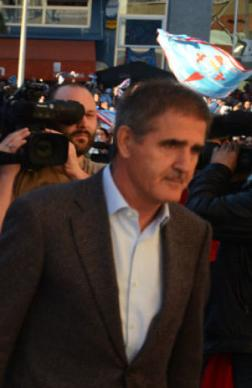
- Herrera as manager of Celta in 2013

Personal information
- Full name: Francisco Herrera Lorenzo
- Date of birth: 2 December 1953 (age 72)
- Place of birth: Barcelona, Spain
- Height: 1.78 m (5 ft 10 in)
- Position: Midfielder

Youth career
- 1965–1972: Damm

Senior career*
Years	Team	Apps	(Gls)
1972–1974	Sabadell	64	(5)
1974–1977	Sporting Gijón	44	(2)
1977–1979	Levante		
1979–1986	Badajoz		

Managerial career
- 1992–1993: Badajoz
- 1995: Badajoz
- 1998: Numancia
- 1998–1999: Mérida
- 2000: Numancia
- 2001–2002: Albacete
- 2002–2003: Poli Ejido
- 2003: Recreativo
- 2004–2006: Liverpool (assistant)
- 2009: Castellón
- 2010: Villarreal B
- 2010–2013: Celta
- 2013–2014: Zaragoza
- 2014–2015: Las Palmas
- 2016–2017: Valladolid
- 2017: Sporting Gijón
- 2018: Aris
- 2018–2019: Las Palmas
- 2019–2020: Birmingham City (assistant)
- * Club domestic league appearances and goals

Francisco "Paco" Herrera Lorenzo (born 2 December 1953) is a Spanish retired footballer who played as a midfielder, and is a manager.

His managerial career spanning over a quarter of a century, was mostly spent in Segunda División, where he managed 13 clubs and achieved promotion to La Liga with Celta and Las Palmas.

== Playing career ==
Born in Barcelona, Catalonia, Herrera began his professional career with Sabadell in his native region, appearing in two Segunda División seasons with the team. In 1974, the 20-year-old signed with Sporting Gijón in La Liga, suffering relegation in his second year.

In 1986, after a two-season spell with Levante, Herrera retired from football with Badajoz, at the age of 32, having played mainly for the Extremadurans in Segunda División B, the new third level created in 1977.

== Coaching career ==
Herrera was connected to his last club, Badajoz, for several years as a manager, first coaching its youth sides and later acting as assistant. He would manage the first team in 24 games in two separate second division campaigns (18 in 1992–93 and six in 1994–95).

During three seasons, Herrera then worked in the second level, with Numancia and Mérida, the only complete one being 1998–99. He was sacked by the latter in late November 1999, following a 1–3 loss at former club Levante; the team eventually ranked sixth, being however demoted due to financial irregularities.

After two seasons in division two, with Albacete and Poli Ejido (finishing in tenth and 13th position respectively), Herrera was appointed at Recreativo in the same tier, being fired on 9 November 2003 after a 0–2 home loss against Andalusia neighbours Córdoba – the team had collected seven draws in 11 matches (plus two wins and as many losses). In the summer of 2004, he joined countryman Rafael Benítez's coaching staff in Liverpool, working as both assistant manager and chief scout for two years.

Herrera left England in June 2006 and returned to his country, serving as director of football at Espanyol for three seasons. He left the club in February 2009 to manage Castellón, replacing Atlético Madrid-bound Abel Resino for the final 21 games of the campaign and leading the Valencians to the seventh place in the second division.

On 4 February 2010, Herrera replaced Juan Carlos Garrido at the helm of Villarreal's reserves, also in the second division, as Garrido had been promoted to the main squad following the sacking of Ernesto Valverde. In the 2010–11 season, he continued working in level two with Celta, leading them to the promotion play-offs where they lost in the semi-finals against Granada, on penalties.

Herrera was also in charge as the Galicians returned to the top flight at the end of the 2011–12 season, as runners-up. He was relieved of his duties on 18 February 2013 after a 1–3 away loss against Getafe, however, with the club ranking third from bottom but eventually saved.

Herrera was appointed at Las Palmas in the second division, on 3 July 2014. He achieved promotion in his first season, with the team returning to the top tier after 13 years.

On 19 October 2015, after a 0–4 defeat at Getafe that left the Canarians ranking second from the bottom, Herrera was sacked and replaced by Quique Setién. On 7 June of the following year, he was named Real Valladolid manager.

On 15 June 2017, Herrera was hired as Sporting Gijón coach after agreeing to a two-year contract. He was sacked on 12 December, after a streak of six matches without wins in the second level.

Herrera returned to active on 31 May 2018, being appointed at Aris in the Super League Greece. On 5 November, after four consecutive league defeats, his contract was terminated by mutual consent.

On 16 November 2018, Herrera returned to Las Palmas after three years, replacing sacked Manolo Jiménez. On 4 March 2019, he was himself dismissed after only winning three of 14 league games.

On 6 July 2019, Herrera joined the coaching staff at Birmingham City, becoming assistant head coach to Pep Clotet.

== Managerial statistics ==
As of match played 3 March 2019

Managerial record by team and tenure
Team	Nat	From	To	Record								Ref
Team	Nat	From	To	G	W	D	L	GF	GA	GD	Win %	Ref
Badajoz	(Spain)	27 January 1992	18 January 1993	44	23	9	12	64	36	+28	52.27	
Badajoz	(Spain)	7 May 1995	30 June 1995	6	2	2	2	6	5	+1	33.33	
Numancia	(Spain)	23 February 1998	30 June 1998	14	4	7	3	15	14	+1	28.57	
Mérida	(Spain)	30 June 1998	22 November 1999	60	20	20	20	66	60	+6	33.33	
Numancia	(Spain)	1 July 2000	27 November 2000	12	3	2	7	13	21	−8	25.00	
Albacete	(Spain)	20 June 2001	5 June 2002	44	16	11	17	45	45	+0	36.36	
Poli Ejido	(Spain)	5 June 2002	30 June 2003	43	12	16	15	36	46	−10	27.91	
Recreativo	(Spain)	30 June 2003	9 November 2003	12	2	8	2	9	10	−1	16.67	
Castellón	(Spain)	1 February 2009	30 June 2009	20	9	4	7	24	19	+5	45.00	
Villarreal B	(Spain)	4 February 2010	20 June 2010	19	6	7	6	27	27	+0	31.58	
Celta	(Spain)	20 June 2010	18 February 2013	119	53	29	37	183	127	+56	44.54	
Zaragoza	(Spain)	19 June 2013	17 March 2014	31	10	9	12	36	39	−3	32.26	
Las Palmas	(Spain)	4 July 2014	19 October 2015	58	27	16	15	90	68	+22	46.55	
Valladolid	(Spain)	7 June 2016	12 June 2017	46	20	10	16	59	53	+6	43.48	
Sporting Gijón	(Spain)	15 June 2017	12 December 2017	20	7	7	6	23	19	+4	35.00	
Aris	(Greece)	31 May 2018	5 November 2018	11	5	1	5	13	11	+2	45.45	
Las Palmas	(Spain)	16 November 2018	4 March 2019	14	3	7	4	13	18	−5	21.43	
Total				573	222	165	186	722	618	+104	38.74	—
