= Santi Castillejo =

Spanish football manager (born 1971)

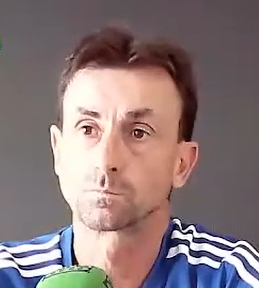
- Castillejo in 2022

Personal information
- Full name: Santiago Castillejo Castillejo
- Date of birth: 5 September 1971 (age 55)
- Place of birth: Valtierra, Spain
- Height: 1.80 m (5 ft 11 in)
- Position: Striker

Youth career
- Tudelano
- Osasuna

Senior career*
Years	Team	Apps	(Gls)
1990–1994	Osasuna B	83	(36)
1993–1996	Osasuna	33	(4)
1994–1995	→ Alavés (loan)	28	(21)
1996–1998	Numancia	58	(19)
1998–2000	Castellón	66	(26)
2000–2003	Gimnàstic	94	(30)
2003–2005	Conquense	75	(33)
2005–2006	Leganés	30	(9)
2006–2008	Reus		
Total		467+	(178+)

Managerial career
- 2008–2009: Reus (assistant)
- 2009–2013: Reus
- 2013: Gimnàstic
- 2014: Llagostera
- 2016: Olot
- 2016–2018: Ascó
- 2018–2026: Osasuna B
- * Club domestic league appearances and goals

Santiago 'Santi' Castillejo Castillejo (born 5 September 1971) is a Spanish former professional footballer who played as a striker, currently a manager.

He was the all-time scoring leader in the Segunda División B, with 184 goals in representation of seven clubs. His La Liga input consisted of 11 games with Osasuna.

After retiring in 2008, Castillejo worked as a manager.

== Playing career ==
Born in Valtierra, Castillejo started his football career with local CA Osasuna, being mainly associated with the reserves and scoring 20 Segunda División B goals with them in the 1992–93 season. He made his La Liga debut with the first team on 14 March 1993, appearing as a late substitute in a 1–0 home win against Real Zaragoza, and featured in just ten games in his only full campaign, which ended in relegation; he was also loaned to Deportivo Alavés during his spell, achieving promotion to Segunda División by netting 22 times (play-offs included).

Released by the Navarrese in summer 1996, Castillejo resumed his career in the second tier but also in the third, with CD Numancia, CD Castellón, Gimnàstic de Tarragona– he scored 21 goals as the club promoted to division two in 2001, best in Group III, second overall – UB Conquense, CD Leganés and CF Reus Deportiu, retiring in 2008 at the age of 37.

== Coaching career ==
Castillejo started working as a manager immediately after retiring, initially being an assistant with Reus in the Tercera División. He was appointed head coach for 2009–10, leading the team to promotion in his second season.

Castillejo agreed on a return to former club Gimnàstic in late May 2013, signing ahead of the 2013–14 campaign. On 4 November, he was relieved of his duties.

On 26 June 2014, Castillejo took the reins of UE Llagostera, recently promoted to the second division. He was dismissed on 21 October, after leaving them in the relegation zone.

On 22 February 2016, Castillejo was named at the helm of UE Olot in the third tier. On 7 June he was appointed at FC Ascó, and renewed his contract the following 13 May.

Castillejo returned to his first club Osasuna on 19 June 2018, as manager of the B team. He led them to promotion to the third division in his first season, and to Primera Federación in 2022.

On 28 May 2026, after suffering relegation, Castillejo left as his contract was due to expire.

== Managerial statistics ==
As of 25 April 2026

Managerial record by team and tenure
Team	Nat	From	To	Record								Ref
Team	Nat	From	To	G	W	D	L	GF	GA	GD	Win %	Ref
Reus	(Spain)	13 June 2009	31 May 2013	166	77	44	45	232	150	+82	46.39	
Gimnàstic	(Spain)	31 May 2013	4 November 2013	15	5	6	4	15	16	−1	33.33	
Llagostera	(Spain)	26 June 2014	21 October 2014	10	2	2	6	4	12	−8	20.00	
Olot	(Spain)	22 February 2016	6 June 2016	12	3	4	5	12	18	−6	25.00	
Ascó	(Spain)	7 June 2016	18 June 2018	76	30	27	19	91	78	+13	39.47	
Osasuna B	(Spain)	19 June 2018	Present	276	118	70	88	402	313	+89	42.75	
Career total				555	235	153	167	756	587	+169	42.34	—
