= History of CD Leganés =

History of Spanish association football club CD Leganés

Club Deportivo Leganés is a football club based in Leganés (Community of Madrid, Spain). This article covers the history from its foundation in 1928 to the present day.

== History ==
=== Foundation ===
The current Club Deportivo Leganés was founded on June 23, 1928 by Félix Pérez de la Serna, with Ramón del Yerro as its first president. The first pitch was a piece of land borrowed from the military rifle range, called "El Paseo de la Estación", inaugurated on July 1, 1928 against Latina F.C., while the first kit was a blue and scarlet shirt with white shorts, later changing to a tricolor kit with equal green, white and red stripes. For the 1928-29 season, the club registered with the Central Regional Federation (now the Royal Madrid Football Federation) and played in the Segunda Categoría Ordinaria, making its debut on its home turf on October 1, again against Latina F.C., in a match that ended 1-1. In the following season, 1929-30, playing in the second group, they qualified to play in the tournament for promotion to the Segunda Categoría Preferente, and managed to be promoted. That season would see the arrival of the first pepinero footballer to play in the First Division: Manuel Guijarro, Pirolo (1929-31). In 1931 he was signed by Atlético de Madrid (1931-34), then in the Second Division, and later played two seasons (1934-36) in the top division with Valencia CF.

On August 17, 1930, the first match was played against Real Madrid CF, a friendly that ended in a 4-4 draw.

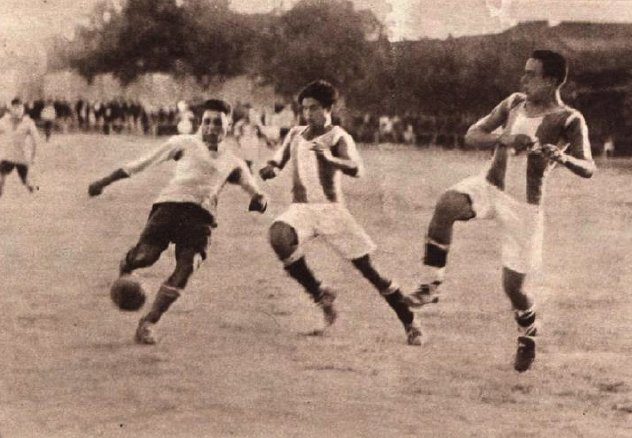
First friendly match against Real Madrid (4-4), August 17, 1930.

The club moved to its own stadium, the Paseo de la Estación ground, and won the Segunda Categoría Preferente on its debut in the 30-31 season. It would play in that division for the next few years, but the reorganization of the tournament in 1934 led to its withdrawal from the competition. Due to disagreements with the Castilian Football Federation, a parallel competition was created under the auspices of the Central Spanish Workers' Cultural and Sports Federation, in which Leganés played in the second division. Two years later, the competition was suspended due to the Spanish Civil War and would not resume for a decade.

=== Competition in semi-professional categories ===
The club was re-established on September 4, 1946, the date of its registration in the Segunda Categoría Ordinaria of the Castilian Federation, and adopted a green kit with white shorts, reinforcing the nickname "pepineros." On its return to competition, it won the championship in the 47-48 season and was promoted to the Segunda Categoría Preferente. In the 48-49 season, it played with a green and white striped shirt and finished second, tied on points with Getafe Deportivo, and was promoted to the Primera Categoría. In the second group of the 49-50 season, it finished third, played in the promotion phase and finished first. It was promoted to the Preferente in the 1950-51 season and to the Third Division at the end of the 1953-54 season, with Gumersindo Repullo Écija as president, after finishing first in the Primera Categoría. In the promotion phase, they lost the first match against Callosa Deportiva and won the second and final match against UD Poblense, coming back from 3-0 down in the first leg to win 6-0.

The debut in the new category coincided with a change of president, Manuel Gómez Casado (who was also the mayor of the city), and a change of kit, with the team adopting a blue and white shirt with vertical stripes, the colors of the city. The performances in the new category were not overly successful: after a fifth place in the debut, the objective was always to stay up, and at the end of the 1959-60 season the team was relegated, finishing sixteenth and bottom of the league. On the other hand, in 1959 the Agrupación Deportiva Legamar was founded, federated in the Tercera Categoría and future Blue and White affiliate.

During the 1960s, the team alternated between the Bronze Division (63-65 and 67-68 seasons) and the Regional Division, never remaining in the Third Division for more than two consecutive seasons. Leganés' demographic growth at the time led to the construction of new facilities, such as the Luis Rodríguez de Miguel Municipal Stadium, which opened in 1966 and hosted local matches for more than three decades. In the 1968-69 season, the club was coached by Uruguayan Wilder Barcos, the club's first foreign coach.

Relegated to the Regional First Division again in 1969-70, they finished seventh, tenth and ninth in the following three seasons before making the leap to the newly created Preferente in 1973-74, with Rafael Mirat Maroto as president. The move was short-lived, as they were relegated to the Primera Categoría after finishing eighth, but in the 1974-75 season they finished champions and returned to the Preferente. On their return to that category, they finished in sixth place, and in the 1976-77 season they finished first, achieving promotion to the Third Division thanks to the expansion of groups and teams in the category with the creation of the Second Division B.

=== Jesús Polo: the longest term ===
A return to the category would be difficult, but they managed to stay up, finishing sixteenth in the 1977-78 season. The following year they finished third, while in November 1978 Jesús Polo González, a La Mancha businessman who lived in the city and remained in office until 2005, took over as president, replacing Manuel Pimentel Gómez-Sánchez. The decade ended with an eleventh place finish in the 1979-80 season, with Joseíto on the bench.

By the eighties, Leganés was already a densely populated city with a considerable industrial base, which meant increased investment in football and the club's budget. In this decade, the goal was not only to stay in the league, but to fight for the top positions in the table, in order to try to make the leap to a higher division. The star player of those years and the club's first legend was Benjamín Moreno, recognizable by his characteristic moustache and dribbling technique, who spent five seasons at Leganés (1980-85), making 165 appearances and scoring 52 goals. The 1980-81 (with Antonio Briones as coach) and 81-82 seasons ended with a respectable sixth-place finish, while in 82-83 they narrowly avoided relegation by finishing sixteenth, with three coaches during the season: Segura, Paco de Gracia and József Tóth. In the Copa del Rey, in the 83-84 season, the tie against Real Madrid Castilla of La Quinta del Buitre was played in Leganés' first visit to the Santiago Bernabéu, with a 3-1 defeat (overall score 4-1), with a goal scored by Moreno. In the 83-84 season they regained their place among the top teams, finishing seventh, and in 84-85 they finished third, close to the promotion spots. In the 1985-86 season, they finally qualified for promotion to the new Second Division B for the first time; after finishing as champions of the Madrid Third Division group, they were eliminated by CD Lugo in the promotion playoffs after a 1-1 draw at Leganés and a 3-2 loss in Galicia. In the 1986-87 season, the Royal Spanish Football Federation decided to expand the Second Division B from one to four groups, with the Castilian federation being awarded seven places due to its footballing potential. That season, the pepinero team, coached by José Díaz Pablo, finished in third place, which earned them a promotion spot on merit.

Their debut in the Bronze Division, which continued with José Díaz Pablo as coach, ended with a surprising seventh place finish. The following season, they finished in eighth place. From the 1989-90 season, Luis Ángel Duque took over as coach, coming from the youth ranks, and they achieved third place. The following season they finished fifth, just two points away from promotion, and in the 1991-92 season they dropped to eighth. On June 4, 1991, the Agrupación Deportiva Legamar became the B team of Leganés under the name Club Deportivo Leganés "B".

Finally, in the 1992-93 season, Leganés pulled off an upset and were promoted to the Second Division for the first time in their history, with a style of play that emphasized physical preparation and tactical discipline. After finishing first in the regular season, they played in a group with Elche CF, Xerez CD and CF Palencia for promotion, and did not lose a single game. The match that sealed their promotion, against Elche, was played at the Luis Rodríguez de Miguel stadium on June 27, 1993, and ended with a 3-0 home win. The average age of the squad at the time was 22, and most of the players did not have professional contracts, so they combined sport with work or studies. The starting eleven consisted of Javier Aguilera in goal; Pizarro, Juanma, Mesas and Dorado in defense; David, May, Fernando and Chuso in midfield; and Peces and Antonio up front. There were also homegrown players such as goalkeeper Mario Soria and midfielder Ángel Manuel Vivar Dorado.

==== First season in the Second Division ====
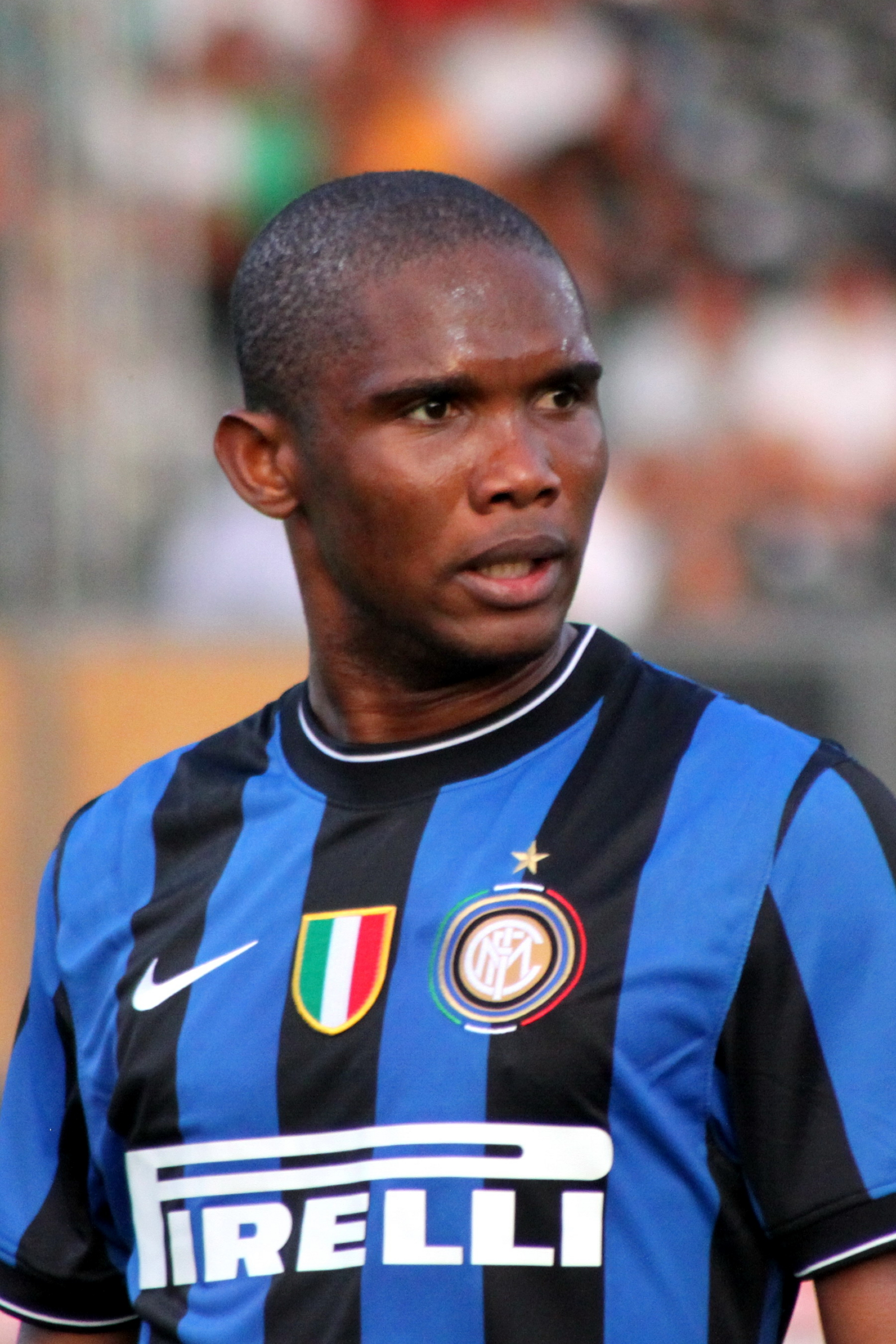
Samuel Eto'o made his professional debut for Leganés in the 1997-98 season. His teammate José Jesús Mesas became his agent.

For the 1993-94 season, both Luis Ángel Duque and the promotion squad were retained in order to ensure the club's permanence in the division. The team struggled, especially in the first half of the season, but eventually managed to consolidate their position and avoid relegation on the final day of the season. A year later, with the lowest budget in the division, they finished penultimate in the 1994-95 season and were destined to be relegated to Segunda B. This did not happen, however, thanks to two events: the restructuring of the top flight in the 22-team league (the pardons for Sevilla FC and Celta de Vigo, who had previously been administratively relegated for failing to provide the required guarantees), which reduced the number of relegations; and the economic problems of Palamós CF, which, after finishing seventeenth ahead of C.D. Leganés, would have enjoyed administrative permanence, but was finally administratively relegated to the Third Division.

On September 21, 1995, the club was transformed into a sports corporation and changed its name to Club Deportivo Leganés, Sociedad Anónima Deportiva. Jesús Polo remained president as he owned the majority of the shares.

The 1995-96 season brought changes. Young players such as defenders Mesas and Óscar Fernández, midfielder Alfredo and strikers Miguel Ángel and Rodri were joined by new signings David Belenguer, Javi López and Miguel Melgar. Under the guidance of Luis Sánchez Duque, who was signed from Getafe, they had a good season, with the blue-and-white club even challenging for promotion. However, a poor run in the final stages of the season saw them finish eighth, the best finish in the club's history. The 1996-97 season saw a repeat performance, with striker Moisés García leading the way with 13 goals in 16 games before being sold to Celta de Vigo in the winter transfer window.

Luis Sánchez Duque left Leganés in 1997-98 and was replaced by Pedro Braojos, who made changes to the squad. Although the homegrown players were kept, new players were brought in who would later make the step up to the first division: Catanha, Crescencio Cuéllar, Jesús Unanua, Llorens, Andrei Mokh and a young Samuel Eto'o on loan from Real Madrid. On the other hand, on February 14, 1998, the new municipal stadium of Butarque was inaugurated. With ups and downs, the club finished thirteenth. The following year, Braojos was replaced by Luis Sánchez Duque, but they finished in a worse position: seventeenth, saved on the last day of the season.

The arrival of Patxi Puñal, Sergio Pachón and Merino did little to change Leganés' downward spiral, and they began the 1999-2000 season in the relegation zone. In an attempt to turn things around, Enrique Martín was hired midway through the season to replace José Antonio Fernández following a 7-1 defeat at Las Palmas. It was not until the 12th matchday that they achieved their first victory, against CD Badajoz, with the home coach receiving a ten-match ban for a controversial challenge on a counterattack by the visitors. The victory boosted the morale of a team that finished thirteenth. Martín remained on the bench until the end of the 2000-01 season.

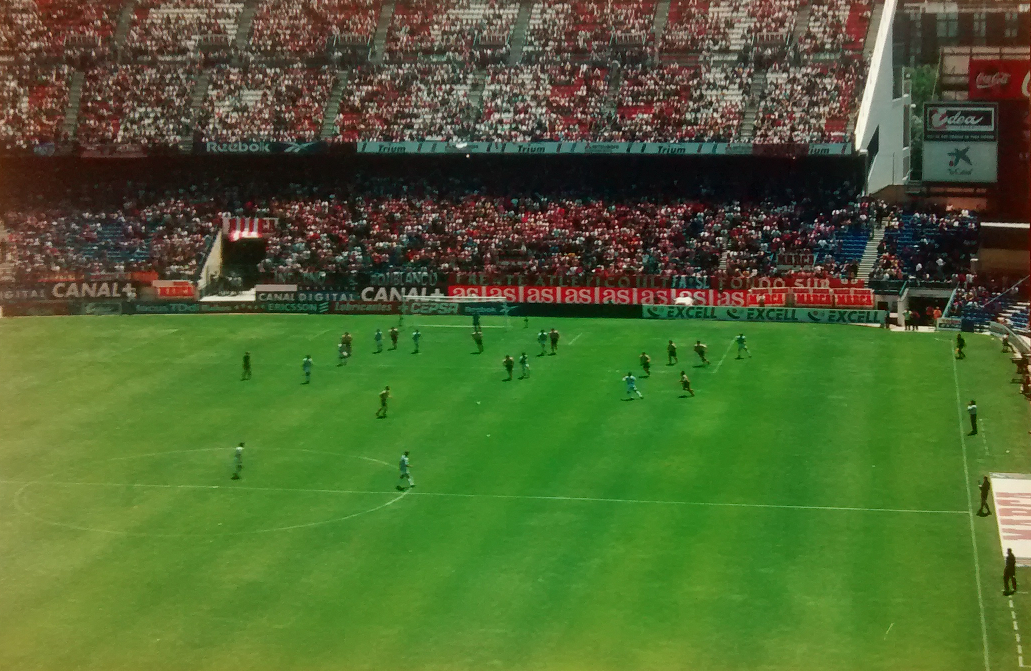
First official match played at the Vicente Calderón stadium on May 27, 2001, with a 1-0 defeat, coinciding with the debut of Fernando Torres.

For the 2001-02 season, Ciriaco Cano was hired as coach, but after a poor run of results, he was replaced by Carlos Sánchez Aguiar. The biggest success of that year was a 2-0 win over Atlético de Madrid at the Vicente Calderón stadium in Atlético's promotion year. Aguiar stayed on the following year, but poor results led to him being replaced by Enrique Martín. Leganés finished nineteenth, in the relegation zone, but were rescued again in the offices: SD Compostela went down for non-payment and the Madrid team took their place. Unai Emery, who would go on to excel as a coach, played in that squad.

==== Arrival and departure of Daniel Grinbank ====
In August 2003, it became official that an Argentine music promoter, Daniel Grinbank, had taken control of CD Leganés and was ready to develop a plan to promote the club to the first division. In practice, the sale of shares was never made official, so Jesús Polo remained president, but Grinbank would be in charge of setting the budget (6 million euros), facilitating the arrival of players, and creating a youth academy. José Pékerman was appointed sporting director, while Carlos Aimar became coach.

A total of fifteen Argentinean and one Chilean players arrived, of whom the best known in Spain were José Chamot, Claudio Enría, Federico Domínguez, Nicolás Medina, Lucas Alessandría and Pablo Calandria. Only eight national players remained, although Pékerman was impressed by the work of Carcedo, Txiki, Macanás and homegrown player Borja Pérez. The move raised expectations that were not met, as the team remained in mid-table. The highlight was the Copa del Rey tie against Real Madrid, in which the blue and white went into extra time only to lose 4-3.

Low attendance and poor returns led Daniel Grinbank to leave the club in January 2004, allowing all the players he signed to leave for free. José Pékerman wanted to stay and tried to manage the resulting team, but he could not do so because he did not have a coaching license in Spain. On the other hand, Carlos Aimar and the team complained that the Argentine businessman had let them down. In addition, it was discovered that the purchase had never been made official, either in the register or for LaLiga purposes. In an interview with the newspaper El País, Grinbank claimed to have lost 2.5 million euros and justified his decision:

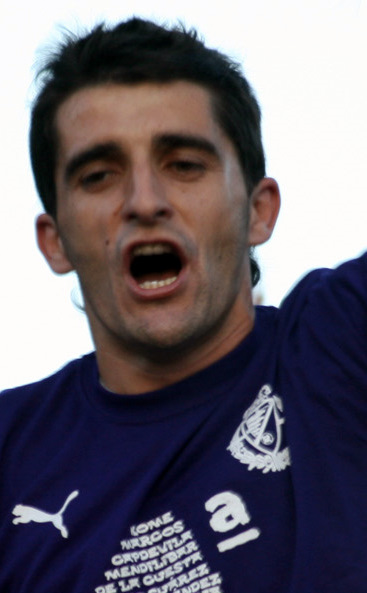
Víctor retired at the age of 37 from his hometown team Leganés in the 2011-12 season.

"The first and most fundamental reason is that we could not overcome the perception that my project discriminated against Spaniards. From the beginning, the press reported more on the immigration department than on the games. This, together with my mistake in thinking that the Argentine community would be involved in the project, meant that of the 1,500 season tickets sold last season, only 980 were renewed and the average attendance was 450 paying spectators, far below any expectations of income. (...) The cup match against Madrid brought me closer, like a time machine, to what was going to happen: we were never going to be profitable, not even in the first division."

Jesús Polo took over again and hired Juan José Martín Delgado as coach. The difficult situation affected the club, which suffered a series of poor results (only three wins in twenty games to be played) and was finally relegated to the Second Division B, in nineteenth place, after losing in Butarque to Córdoba, with a lone goal by Nico Olivera on the last day of the championship, which saved his team thanks to those three points.

==== Return to Second Division B ====
During their ten seasons in the third division, CD Leganés' goal was to return to the second division as soon as possible. For the 2004-05 season, Paco Gutiérrez, who had experience in the third division and had coached the pepineros' reserve team the previous season, was appointed sporting director. At the start of the season, CD Leganés were in contention for promotion with the signings of Jordi Lardín and Marcos Márquez, but a poor run of results led to the dismissal of the coach and the hiring of Quique Estebaranz. The team failed to finish in fourth place and ended up in fifth, out of the promotion playoffs, tied on points with RSD Alcalá, who were in the promotion playoffs. Midway through the season, Jesús Polo left the presidency and sold his shares to a consortium of local investors led by Rubén Fernández. The following season, the previous squad was dismantled and veteran players such as Santi Castillejo and Marcos Sequeiros were signed. After two defeats in the first two matches, which led to the dismissal of Estebaranz, Luis Ángel Duque returned to the bench. The results did not come and the club remained in the relegation zone on the 28th matchday, when Santiago Martín Prado took over the bench and saved the team, which finished in a disappointing thirteenth place, the worst position in the category. Duque remained on the coaching staff as sporting director.

For the 2006-07 season, the team signed striker Nacho Aznar, while Pradito remained on the bench. It was a season that saw the blue and white drift through the middle of nowhere, avoiding relegation but making symbolic moves towards the playoff places at the start of the championship. They finished eighth. In the 2007-08 season, David Gordo took over the bench and Berodia and Quini joined the team. Again, they were in the relegation zone for much of the first half of the season, until a run of positive results in the last few games allowed the team to finish in an unimpressive twelfth place without fear of relegation.

=== Economic crisis and purchase of the club by the Moreno Pavón family ===
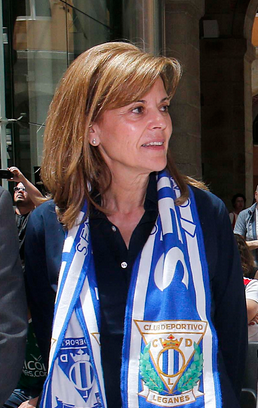
María Victoria Pavón, club president from 2008 to 2022 and wife of majority shareholder Felipe Moreno in 2016.

During this time, the club's economic situation deteriorated. In the 2008-09 season, the team managed to qualify for the promotion playoffs with goals from Javi Vicente, Nacho Aznar and Aníbal Zurdo, but the club's internal situation was complicated by a lack of sponsors and non-payments. Three years after his arrival, Rubén Fernández decided to sell the majority of his shares to Felipe Moreno Romero, a local businessman with investments in Spain and Brazil. His wife, María Victoria Pavón, took over as president. The new leaders paid off the debts, promoted a more austere management model, and promoted a new communication policy to recover the social mass in the city. In terms of sport, Leganés qualified for the promotion phase on the last matchday, with Gordo being sacked on the penultimate matchday and replaced by Agustín Vara. The promotion phase was a short one, with Leganés eliminated by Real Jaén after a 2-2 draw in the first leg at Butarque and a 5-0 thrashing at the Estadio de la Victoria.

The following year, Luis Ángel Duque returned to the bench and Quini scored twenty goals. With eight games remaining and seven points out of the promotion places, the board sacked the coach and brought back Agustín Vara, who almost pulled off the miracle. In the end, the pepineros finished in fifth place, just two points from the spots that would have qualified them for the promotion phase. Despite finishing fifth, the team suffered one of the most humiliating defeats in their history, losing 1-0 to the reserve team of their historic rivals Getafe in Butarque on matchday 24.

Duque stepped down as manager for the 2010-11 season and was replaced by Paco Belmonte from Ciudad de Murcia, and veteran goalscorer Mikel Arruabarrena was signed, who would surpass Quini's tally from the previous season with twenty-one goals. Despite finishing fourth that year, the club was plagued by instability on the bench. Miguel Rivera started as coach, but was inexplicably sacked on the twenty-first matchday when the team was in second place, four points off fifth place and nine points off the leaders. He was replaced by Rafa Muñoz, and the result was disastrous: five games, five defeats, and the team finished seventh, out of the playoff spots and four points adrift. Finally, youth coach José María "Chema" Rico took over for the last few games, and the team qualified for the playoffs in fourth place, but were eliminated again by CF Badalona: 2-1 win for the pepineros in the first leg and 1-0 defeat in Catalonia.

The 2011-12 season saw another change of coaches: four managers, but with worse results. Miguel Álvarez took over and the arrival of veteran strikers Víctor Fernández and Rubén Navarro gave the fans hope. The start, with modest results, led the team to relegation positions and once again a coach was sacked. He was replaced by Carlos Orúe, who managed to get the team out of the relegation zone, but not by much. On the twenty-fourth matchday he was sacked and Chema Rico returned to the bench. The team slipped to the bottom of the table for several games, and the coach was fired. With four games to go and one point from safety in third from last, Víctor took over as player-coach and avoided relegation with a 5-2 win over Atlético de Madrid B on the final matchday.

As a result of these events, the board of directors decided on the strengthening of the position of its future coaches. For the 2012-2013 season, Miguel Melgar was hired as sporting director and Pablo Alfaro as coach, with the goal of promotion. Dioni Villalba, another prolific goalscorer, joined Carlos Martínez, Carlos de la Vega and others at Butarque. Despite a poor start, Alfaro stayed on and the team went on a positive run, finishing second in the regular league, just three points behind the champions. They were knocked out of the promotion playoffs by Lleida Esportiu, losing 2-1 away and 1-1 at Butarque, with former captain Mario Fuentes scoring in stoppage time. Both Melgar and Alfaro left the club at the end of the season.

=== Asier Garitano's stint (return to the Second Division and promotion to the First Division) ===
For the 2013-14 season, the board hired Basque coach Asier Garitano, who came from Alcoyano and had extensive experience coaching clubs in the Valencian Community. Starting with a reduced squad of just five players upon his arrival, Garitano built a team that stood out for its defensive solidity throughout the season, conceding only 24 goals in the regular season. After a slow start, the team reached fourth place in the standings for the first time on matchday sixteen. Seven wins in eight matches saw them top the standings from matchday twenty-seven, but they would eventually lose the top spot to Sestao River. A loss to Real Madrid C (their second in a row) threatened their promotion push, and Asier Garitano made changes to the starting XI, including replacing first-choice goalkeeper Dani Barrio with winter market signing Queco Piña, who conceded only two goals by the end of the season. On the final day of the league season, they had not yet qualified for the promotion playoffs. A goal by Fernando Velasco against Athletic B secured second place and qualified them for the fourth promotion phase in five years, where they eliminated CD Guijuelo, Lleida Esportiu, and CE L'Hospitalet. In the final match, played at the Feixa Llarga on June 22, 2014, Asturian Carlos Álvarez scored a scissor-kick goal to send the Madrid team to the Second Division.

The starting XI for this match included Queco Piña in goal; Sergio Postigo, Mantovani, Santamaría and Luis Ruiz in defense; Alberto Martín, Eraso, Fer Ruiz, Álvaro García and Fran Moreno in midfield; and Carlos Álvarez up front. Also notable were goalkeeper Dani Barrio, captain Carlos de la Vega, defender Paco Candela and winger Carlos Martínez.

For their return to professional competition in 2014-15, Garitano stayed on as coach and retained much of the squad from the previous season, with new signings including striker Borja Lázaro and goalkeeper Jon Ander Serantes. The Blue and Whites played their best games at the Butarque Stadium, but poor away results prevented them from escaping the relegation zone. To avoid this, they strengthened their squad in the winter transfer window with the loan signings of Bryan Rabello, Chuli, Erik Morán and Marc Bertrán. Thanks to 11 goals from Chuli, the team's top scorer, and an improved away record, Leganés finished the season in tenth place.

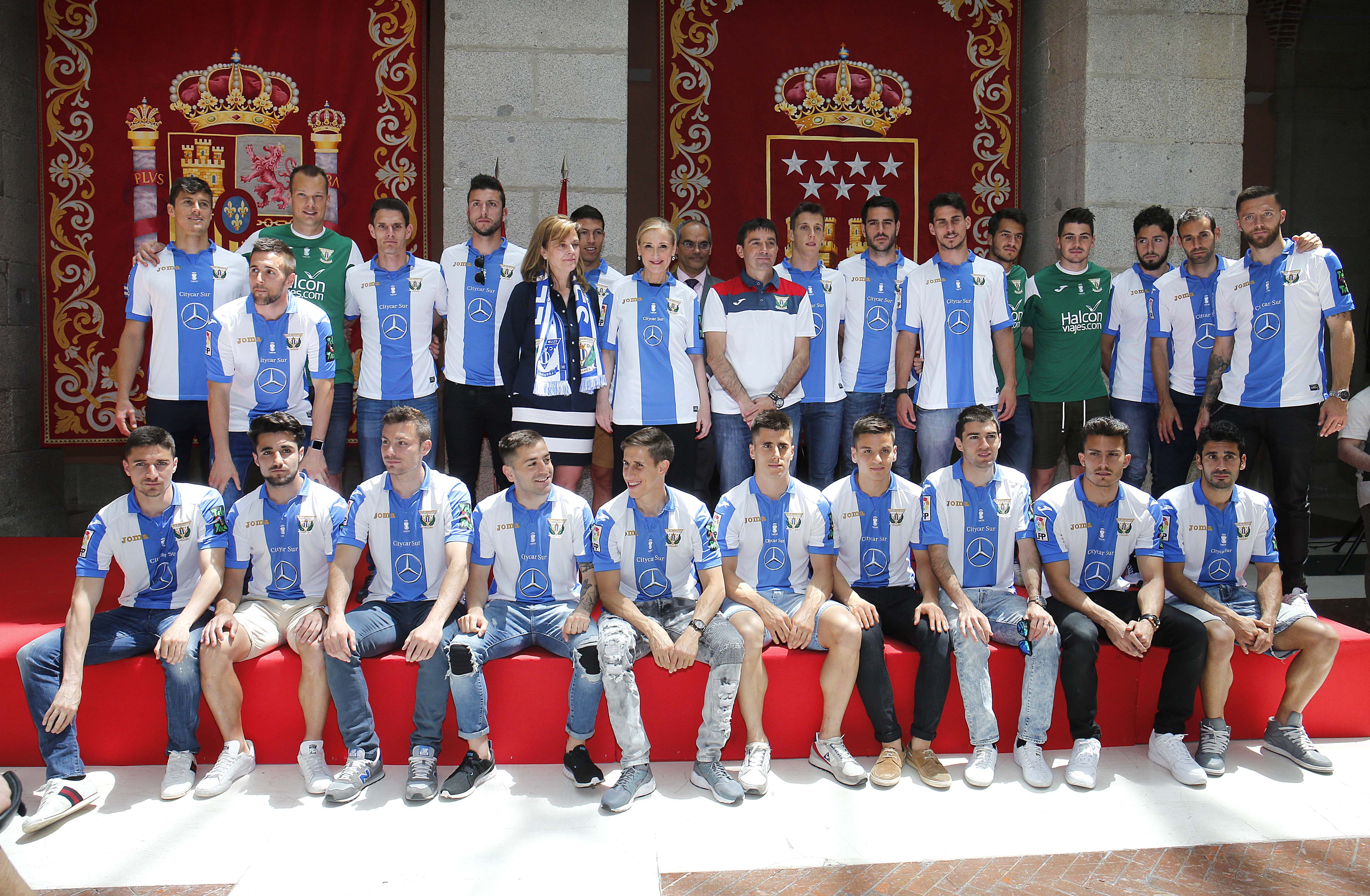
The team that won the historic promotion to the First Division in 2016.

In the 2015-16 season, Garitano had to deal with the departure of two of his stars, Javi Eraso and Chuli, as well as the sale of Sergio Postigo to Spezia Calcio. To solve these problems, he hired Txema Indias from CD Toledo as sporting director, and both put their faith in young players: Alexander Szymanowski, Rubén Peña and Jorge Miramón, as well as numerous loans from Athletic Club (Guillermo, Albizua, Bustinza, Ruiz de Galarreta), Deportivo (Pablo Insua) and even Juventus (Gabriel Pires). Of the twenty-three players on the team, only five remained from the squad that was promoted to the second division, including captain Martín Mantovani. Despite a series of disappointing draws in their opening matches, Leganés began to improve in December, going on a fourteen-match unbeaten streak, and a strong performance in Butarque put them in contention for promotion. For the first time in their history, they went into the final round as leaders after the first matchday, which they did by beating eventual champions Deportivo Alavés 2-0 in Butarque. After going into the final round in second place with a chance of winning the league, they secured direct promotion on June 4, 2016 by beating CD Mirandés 1-0 in Anduva, thanks to a header from Insua, in front of more than a thousand fans. CD Leganés were thus promoted to the First Division for the first time in their history, becoming the sixty-first team to play in the top flight.

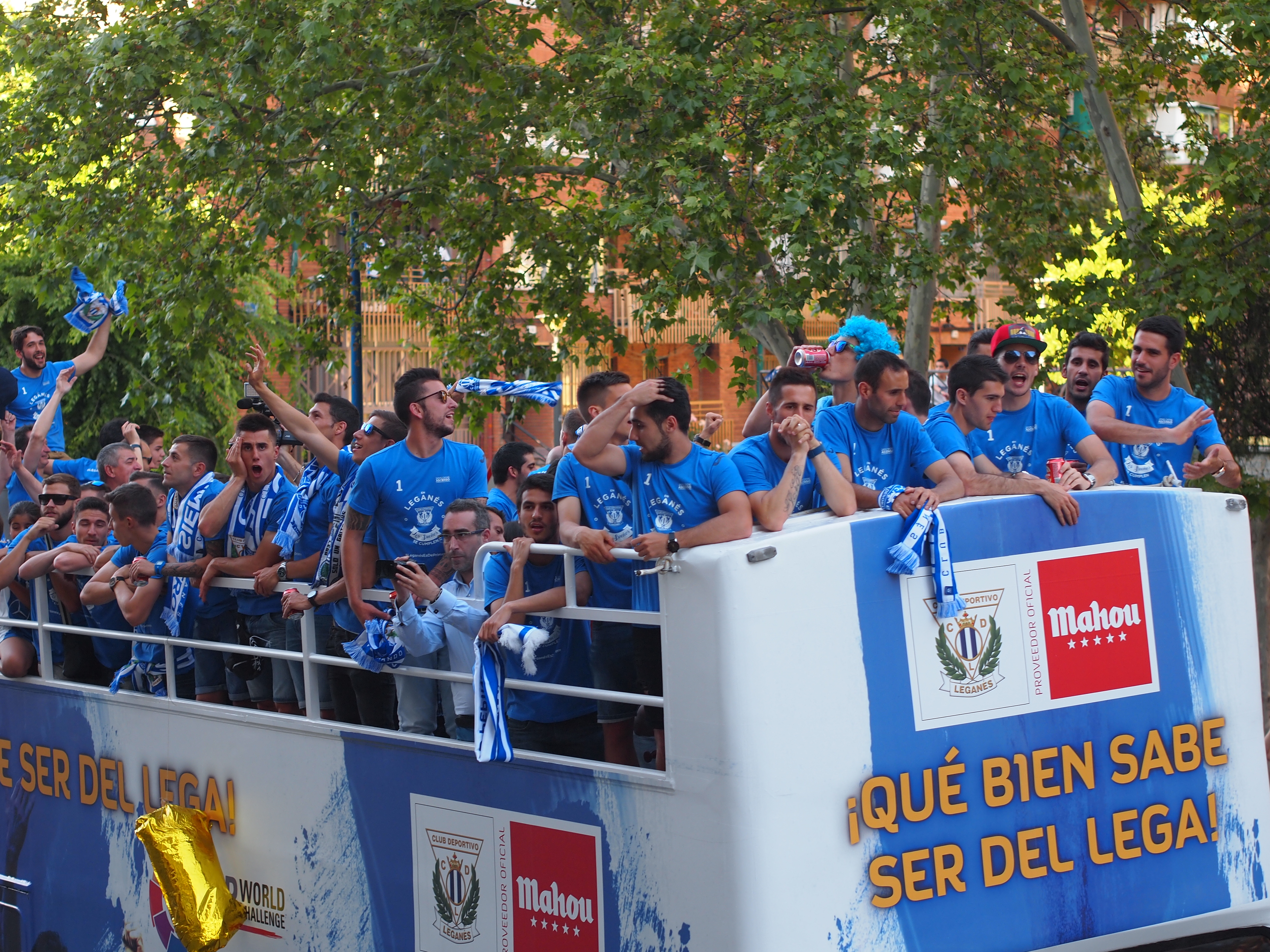
The blue and white players celebrate their promotion to the first division in the streets of Leganés.

==== First appearance in the first division ====
Asier Garitano strengthened his squad with the signings of Gabriel Appelt Pires, who had been on loan from Juventus, Diego Rico and Guerrero, as well as the loan signings of Rubén Pérez, Unai López and Robert Ibáñez. The 2016-17 league season started very well, with a 1-0 debut win over Real Club Celta de Vigo, with a goal from Víctor Díaz at the Balaídos stadium, and a goalless draw with Atlético de Madrid in the first game played at Butarque, with Jon Ander Serantes being named player of the month for not conceding a goal. The first defeat came in the following match against Sporting at El Molinón (2-1). A painful 5-1 defeat at the hands of FC Barcelona was followed by a 2-1 win at the Riazor. Another historic date was the first visit to the Bernabéu, which ended in a 3-0 defeat, and the first victory at the Butarque came on the 12th matchday, a 2-0 win over Osasuna, with the misfortune of Robert Ibáñez being injured and missing the rest of the season. A week later, Serantes also suffered a serious injury and was out for the rest of the season, forcing the club to look for a replacement: Iago Herrerín was borrowed from Athletic Club. In the winter market, Samu García, Tito, Siovas (a fundamental pillar in the middle of the defense), Alberto Bueno, El Zhar and Erik Morán, who returned a season and a half later, joined the pepineros. After ten matches without a win, including defeats at the Vicente Calderón (2-0), to Sporting (2-0) and a defeat at the Camp Nou (2-1), the blue-and-white team took a breather with back-to-back home victories over Deportivo (4-0) and Granada CF (1-0). The first match against Real Madrid ended in a 4-2 defeat. Just as Sporting were pushing hard to get out of the relegation zone, Leganés scored two more decisive victories at home: 3-0 against UD Las Palmas and 4-0 against Real Betis. On May 14, 2017, they secured their place in the top flight with one game to play, drawing 1-1 with Athletic Club at the San Mamés Stadium thanks to a goal from Alexander Szymanowski. They finished the season in a respectable seventeenth place, four points above the relegation zone, without having been in the relegation zone at any point during the entire competition. A draw at home to Deportivo Alavés ended the season and the careers of Alberto Martín and Víctor Díaz as pepineros.

Asier Garitano and Martín Mantovani's second season in the top flight, which would be their last, was marked by the arrival of Iván Cuéllar in goal, Joseba Zaldúa and Mauro dos Santos in defense, and Nordin Amrabat up front. It would be a relatively quiet season, keeping a distance in points from the relegation places, which once again the team did not occupy. The start of the season, with back-to-back 1-0 wins over Deportivo Alavés at home and Real Club Deportivo Espanyol away, promised a low-scoring season, but also a defense that would concede few goals as the pepineros climbed to third in the table. A 2-1 defeat in the South Madrid derby was followed by back-to-back 2-0 victories away at Las Palmas and Málaga (with a goalless draw at home against Atlético de Madrid in between), and another 1-0 home win, the first against a historic team, Athletic Club, would see the team break into the top five for the last time. The following four matchdays would be marked by defeats against big teams: Sevilla FC (2-1), Valencia CF (3-0), FC Barcelona (0-3) and Celta de Vigo (1-0). The defeat to Real Betis, which came from behind in the final moments, left Leganés in thirteenth place at the halfway point of the season, eight points adrift of relegation but with a game in hand following the postponement of their clash with Real Madrid due to the latter's participation in the Club World Cup.

The second half of the season began with a comeback in Vitoria, where they equalized Deportivo Alavés' early 2-0 lead with goals from Gabriel Pires from the penalty spot and Joseba Zaldúa in the final minute. With their sights set on the Copa del Rey, the blue and white then went on a six-game winless streak after the Espanyol win, losing to Girona (3-0), Real Madrid in a postponed match (3-1) and Atlético de Madrid on their first visit to the Metropolitano Stadium (4-0) before a 2-0 win over Málaga CF ended the latter's chances of avoiding relegation. Victories over Sevilla (2-1) and Celta (1-0) made up for losses to Athletic (2-0), Valencia (0-1), Barcelona (3-1) and Villarreal (2-1). A win against Deportivo de La Coruña would have been enough to avoid relegation, but a 1-1 draw meant that the team had to wait until the next matchday. A 2-1 defeat at the Santiago Bernabéu Stadium meant that they secured their place in the league the following day, when Deportivo were beaten by Barcelona at the Riazor. The remaining three matchdays ended with two defeats (Levante UD 0-3 and Real Sociedad 2-3) and an entertaining three-goal win over Betis to bid farewell to the architects of the pepinero miracle, Asier Garitano and Martín Mantovani. They repeated the previous season's seventeenth-place finish.

Meanwhile, in the Copa del Rey, they pulled off the miracle of reaching the semifinals. In the first round, they eliminated Real Valladolid with 2-1 and 1-0 wins, and in the round of sixteen they eliminated Villarreal with a last-minute double, adding a 1-0 win at Butarque to a 2-1 away win at Villarreal. In the quarterfinals, Leganés faced the might of Real Madrid. The first leg in Butarque was a tight affair, with a last-gasp goal from Marco Asensio sending the tie to the Santiago Bernabéu. In the return leg at the Santiago Bernabéu, a stunning goal from Eraso equalized the score. After Karim Benzema equalized after the break, a goal from Gabriel Pires gave the blue and white the decisive advantage in what would be their first victory on Real Madrid turf and against the white team (it would also be the first time Real Madrid would be eliminated playing the second leg at home after winning the first). The next match was against Sevilla FC. The draw in Butarque gave them hope, but in Nervión they could not win and Leganés were eliminated in their best Copa del Rey ever, losing 2-0.

==== Pellegrino: success and failure ====
For the 18-19 season, Argentine coach Mauricio Pellegrino was chosen to take over the team. Leganés, reinforced by two Argentine players (Jonathan Silva and Guido Carrillo) whom Pellegrino knew from his time at Estudiantes de La Plata, started the league with an acceptable performance, which allowed them to be a few points above the relegation zone at the end of the first third of the competition. A poor run of results at the start of the season left them in the relegation zone for ten matches (including two rounds at the bottom). A 2-1 comeback against FC Barcelona broke the losing streak with their first win of the season. A tactical switch to 5-3-2 against Levante UD resulted in a run of seven league games (plus two in the cup) without defeat, Leganés' best run in La Liga, and a win over Deportivo Alavés moved them out of the relegation zone. In terms of records, the biggest away win was 4-2 against Real Valladolid. The first half of the season ended with a 1-0 win over bottom side SD Huesca, with 22 points, three above the relegation zone, and only one defeat at Butarque (1-0 against Villarreal CF). The second half of the season began with a 3-1 defeat at the Camp Nou, but a last-gasp 2-1 win at the Vallecas Stadium revived the relegation battle, with Rayo and Leganés level on points and just two points above the drop zone. After a convincing 3-0 win over Real Betis, they lost at Anoeta by the same score, and in the double-header against the Valencian teams, they scored: 1-0 against Levante UD and 1-1 against Valencia CF. After two consecutive defeats against Atlético at the Metropolitano stadium (1-0) and against their nemesis Girona (2-0), a very important victory was achieved in the fight for survival in the South Madrid derby against a Getafe team fighting for a place in the Champions League (2-0). They went on a four-match unbeaten streak, with an injury-time win over Real Valladolid thanks to a goal from Guido Carrillo, an injury-time draw at Mendizorroza thanks to a great goal from Jonathan Silva, and a draw against Real Madrid (their first points against the whites in the league). After four games without a win (defeats against Villarreal and Athletic Club, a draw against Celta), their salvation came in the form of a 3-0 victory over Sevilla at the Ramón Sánchez Pizjuán, the first ever victory in that stadium. A few days later, the pepineros and the Argentine coach agreed to extend his contract for two more seasons, until 2021. In the Copa del Rey, after eliminating Rayo Vallecano (3-2), Leganés was knocked out of the competition by Real Madrid (3-1).

However, the 2019-20 season got off to a very bad start for Leganés, who failed to win any of their first nine league games. By retaining the core of the previous season's squad, signing key players who had been on loan the previous year (Jonathan Silva, Martin Braithwaite, Kenneth Omeruo) and extending the loans of Óscar Rodríguez and Guido Carrillo, the foundations of the new squad began to be laid, completed by some signings such as Roberto Rosales and the loans of Roque Mesa, Christian Rivera, Marc Navarro, Kévin Rodrigues, Chidozie Awaziem and Aitor Ruibal. The first matchday, the team's debut in Butarque, would be a prelude to what would happen that season. It was a defeat at the hands of CA Osasuna, thanks to a lone goal from Chimy Ávila, after the VAR had disallowed three controversial goals scored by the home side. This defeat was followed by three others (Atlético de Madrid at home, 1-0; Betis' comeback at Sevilla, 2-1; and Villarreal CF, again at home, 3-0), leaving the pepineros at the bottom of the table. The situation was stabilized at the Mestalla with a 1-1 draw against Valencia CF, both goals coming from penalties, which led to further complaints from the blue-and-whites when the VAR awarded the penalty to Valencia despite the fact that it was a foul outside the box. The 1-1 draw against Athletic Club was followed by three defeats in a row: against Granada CF, 1-0; against Levante UD, 2-1, with a new scandal because the VAR confirmed for the second time a penalty for a foul outside the area, with the pepinero team requesting to replay the game, a request rejected by the RFEF in February, and Getafe, 2-0 in the South Madrid derby. With this defeat, Mauricio Pellegrino voluntarily left the bench, and reserve team coach Luis Cembranos took over. He made his debut with the first win of the season, 1-0 against RCD Mallorca, but defeats to Real Madrid CF (5-0) and SD Eibar (1-2) ended his adventure in the first team and he returned to the reserve team. The replacement would be Javier Aguirre. He began with a draw at Anoeta against Real Sociedad (1-1), and after two defeats against FC Barcelona (1-2) and Sevilla (1-0) came another victory against a direct rival, Celta de Vigo, 3-2. After a draw against Deportivo Alavés in Vitoria, which was marred by another incorrect VAR decision for a handball by Joselu in the Vitorian equalizer, Leganés defeated Espanyol 2-0 in their fight for survival. After a 2-2 draw at the Zorrilla against Real Valladolid, which wasted a chance to escape the relegation zone, Sevilla FC signed Youssef En-Nesyri for 20 million euros in the winter transfer window. Miguel Ángel Guerrero, Bryan Gil, Ibrahim Amadou and Roger Assalé completed the squad. A draw (0-0) with Atlético de Madrid and an injury-time win with a direct free kick from Óscar brought the miracle closer, but after a draw with Betis and a 2-0 defeat at the hands of Levante, FC Barcelona dealt the team a fatal blow, signing Martin Braithwaite outside the winter market due to a long-term injury to one of their players. Within a month, Leganés was without its two star strikers, who, along with Óscar, accounted for almost all of the team's goals. A crucial 1-0 defeat at Vigo with ten men was followed by a 1-1 draw against Alavés and an important comeback at Villarreal (2-1, first away win of the season), which saw Leganés finish 17th in La Liga. After that match, the 2020 coronavirus pandemic in Spain suspended the competition until June. The return to competition ended the previous run with a loss to Real Valladolid (2-1) and another missed opportunity to climb out of the relegation zone, as well as a 2-0 defeat to Barcelona. The visit to Mallorca ended in a 1-1 draw, although a win would have lifted the pepineros out of the drop zone. A draw against Granada CF, in which Miguel Ángel Guerrero missed a penalty, a 2-1 stoppage-time loss to Osasuna in Pamplona and a 3-0 thrashing at the hands of Sevilla all but ended their hopes of avoiding relegation. However, their first win after returning to competition came against Espanyol (0-1), and with a draw against Eibar at Ipurúa and wins over Valencia (1-0, their first win over Valencia) and Athletic Club (2-0, their first win at San Mamés), Leganés were hoping for a miracle, going into the last matchday one point behind Celta de Vigo, which would have meant salvation. On Matchday 38, against the champions, Real Madrid, who had nothing to play for, all they could do was win and hope that Celta de Vigo did not win. Celta drew 0-0 against Espanyol, but Leganés could only manage a 2-2 draw, again with a clear VAR error, as it did not inform the referee of a handball by Jović. The error condemned Leganés to relegation to the Second Division, ending a four-year dream in the First Division, ending the season as it began, with VAR errors, and making Leganés the team most affected by VAR in the 2019-20 season. In the Copa del Rey, the adventure was short, advancing to the next round on penalties against Andorra CF, beating CD Ebro by a single goal, and losing 5-0 to FC Barcelona in the round of 16.

=== Return to the second division ===
The coach chosen for the Second Division project was José Luis Martí. Retaining Pichu Cuéllar, Rubén Pérez, Omeruo, Eraso, Bustinza and Rosales from the previous First Division season, the squad was renewed with the signing of Javi Hernández, Gaku Shibasaki, Borja Bastón, with extensive experience in the Second Division, and Asier Riesgo and Rubén Pardo, with experience in the First Division. Young players with potential were signed, such as Miguel de la Fuente and Diego Conde. Due to the Covid-19 pandemic, matches in the 2020-21 season continued to be played without spectators. After a hesitant start, with home wins and away defeats to newly promoted teams (CD Castellón, UE Sabadell), it was a 2-0 win over leaders RCD Espanyol on matchday 14 that put them in third place. With five games without defeat and seven wins in their last nine, the team seemed to be firing on all cylinders. A week later, however, they suffered another away defeat, 3-2 to SD Ponferradina. The following week, a 1-0 win over another promotion contender, Rayo Vallecano, seemed to put the team back on track. However, a run of five games without a win (two wins and three draws) followed, which was only alleviated in the Copa del Rey by wins over Ourense CF and UD Socuéllamos in the first round, only to be followed by a 1-0 extra-time defeat to Sevilla CF in the round of 32. A league defeat away to UD Las Palmas on the 23rd matchday meant the end of Martí's tenure, with Leganés in fifth place. His replacement would be the hero of the promotions to the Second and First Divisions, Asier Garitano. The change was effective, with five consecutive wins to regain third place, just three points off direct promotion. The streak was broken the following matchday with a 1-0 defeat at the Cartagonova stadium, with only two wins in nine games (1-3 at Oviedo and 2-1 against CE Sabadell). Away defeats to the two teams above them, RCD Mallorca (1-0) and RCD Espanyol (2-1), made direct promotion almost impossible, with only eight games remaining and eleven points separating them from the top spot. They did not lose a single game until the end of the season, recording four wins and four draws and closing the regular season with a historic 5-0 victory over Real Zaragoza at La Romareda, their biggest ever away win. Third place (nine points behind the top two) would give them the right to compete for promotion to the First Division for the first time against sixth-placed Rayo Vallecano. The disaster of the first leg (3-0) in Vallecas, with two goals in three minutes and the final blow in injury time, made a comeback in Butarque (2-1) impossible, with the Vallecas team becoming the third team to be promoted that season. The second leg would be the first to be played in front of a crowd (reduced capacity) after the COVID-19 pandemic. This resounding defeat was the end of the team's first attempt at a return to the division from which they had been relegated the year before.

The new project for the 2021-22 season would keep Garitano on the bench, but the squad would be strengthened by the return of Recio and the signings of Borja Garcés, Édgar Bárcenas, Xavi Quintillà, Fede Vico and Iván Villar, as well as the inclusion of Naim García and Seydouba Cissé from the reserve team. The debut against Xabi Alonso and Jon Karrikaburu's Real Sociedad B at Anoeta ended in defeat, and the first win did not come until the sixth matchday against SD Amorebieta, when two consecutive victories were followed by an away win against CD Mirandés. However, six games without a win, with four defeats and two draws, left Leganés in twentieth place in the relegation zone, and the conflict between the coach and Borja Garcés, who left the club without permission to attend his brother's wedding, was enough to get rid of Asier Garitano. He was replaced by Mehdi Nafti, who took the team out of the relegation zone in four matches. In the Copa del Rey, they advanced through the first rounds against Xerez CD and Cultural Leonesa, before losing 3-2 to Real Sociedad in Butarque in the round of 32. In the winter market, they signed goalkeeper Dani Jiménez and brought in Yacine Qasmi, Robert Ibáñez, Lazar Ranđelović and the return of Allan Romeo Nyom. In the league, the team went on an eight-match unbeaten run. Now in no-man's land in the final stretch of the season, with their eyes on the drop, Leganés secured their place in the division with 2-0 wins over CF Fuenlabrada (3-2) and SD Huesca (2-1) and an away win at El Toralín (3-0) to end another disappointing season in twelfth place at home to UD Almería, who secured promotion with a 2-2 draw on the final day. The Franco-Tunisian coach would leave the club at the end of the season after achieving the goal of staying up.

=== Jeff Luhnow era ===
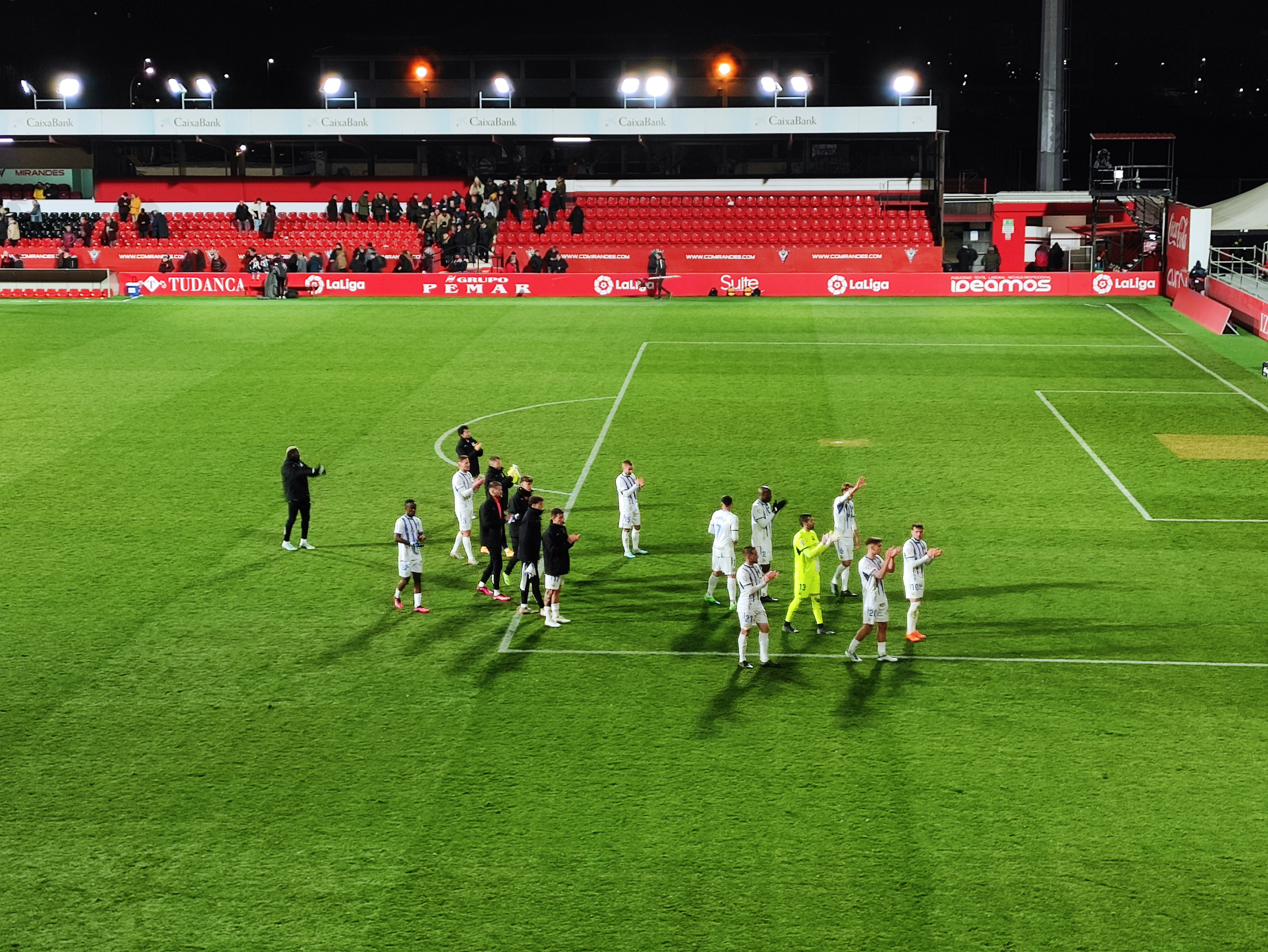
The players of the 2022-23 season during a visit to Miranda de Ebro in February 2023.

The summer of 2022 was unusual in terms of change of ownership. After almost sixteen years, Felipe Moreno decided to sell the club to the Blue Crow Group, with the American Jeff Luhnow taking over as president of the club, for an estimated price of 70-80 million euros, about 39 as the sale price and another 44.25 as a dividend distribution, which would correspond to the money received from the sales of Youssef En-Nesyri and Martin Braithwaite in 2020, which had remained in the club's coffers and had never been reinvested in signings. Despite feeling "tired" after fourteen seasons of managing Leganés, Felipe invested the profits from the sale in the purchase of Real Murcia for 10 million euros and in paying off the debts that the Murcia club had. The coach chosen by Jeff Luhnow, who confirmed Txema Indias as sporting director, to try to return to the first division for the third time, would be Imanol Idiakez. For the 2022-23 season, the third attempt to return to the first division, players of the stature of Dani Raba, Jorge Miramón, Yvan Neyou, Riza Durmisi and Piotr Parzyszek, with experience in the first division, were signed. However, the season began with three consecutive defeats for Leganés and by the eighth matchday the team was bottom of the table with a record of one win, one draw and six defeats. With the coach under scrutiny, a victory in Cartagena was achieved, with a VAR controversy over an offside in stoppage time that could have resulted in a draw. After overcoming the stumble in Ciutat de València, they went on a record eleven games without defeat (six wins and five draws), moving within two points of the playoff spots. In the middle of this streak, Leganés fell in the Copa del Rey, being eliminated at the first hurdle on penalties at Gernika's home ground. The winter transfer window saw the arrival of Enric Franquesa, Iker Undabarrena and Jon Karrikaburu. However, a poor run of results followed, with just one win in twelve matches. Five defeats in a row led to the dismissal of the coach, and the pepinero bench was handed over to then Leganés B coach Carlos Martínez. He made his debut away to SD Ponferradina, a team that was five points below the relegation zone. A lone goal by Sergio González from a corner in the 92nd minute gave the pepinero club half a reprieve. From then on, with the club no longer in danger of dropping out of the division, they scored comeback victories over SD Huesca and defeated Burgos CF (3-0), to end another disappointing season in fourteenth place, ending the season at the home of Granada CF and once again seeing their rivals promoted to the first division. Despite achieving the goal, Carlos Martínez would not continue as coach.

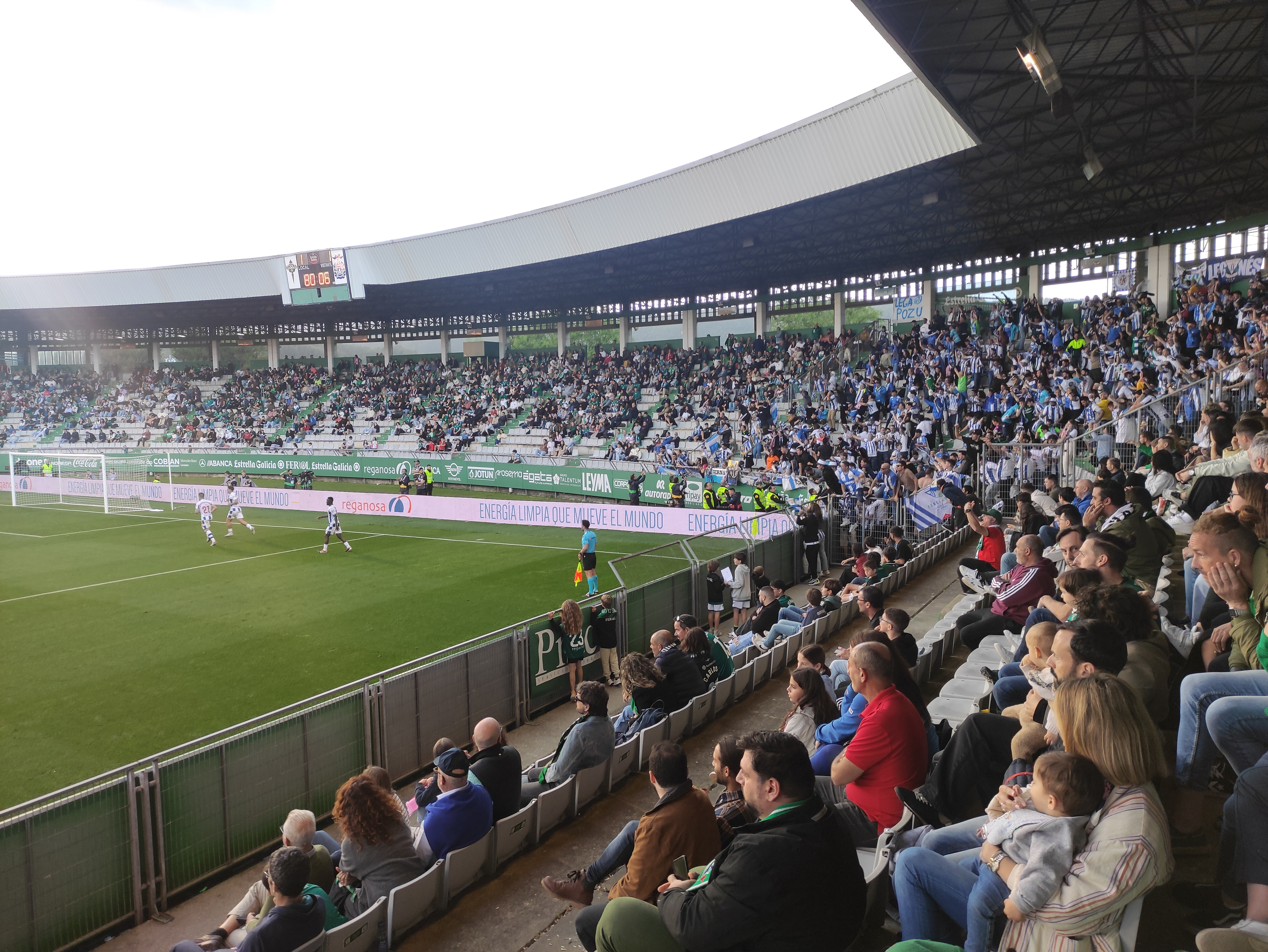
Pepineros fans at the La Malata stadium in May 2024.

The fourth attempt at promotion would be led from the bench by Borja Jiménez, a young coach with only eighteen games of experience in the Second Division with FC Cartagena and barely one season in the First Division RFEF as coach of Deportivo de La Coruña, but with two promotions to the Second Division: with the Murcia team and with CD Mirandés. This season saw up to ten signings in the summer market, with the return of Diego Conde and Miguel de la Fuente, the promotion of Diego García from the reserve team and the free signings of Francisco Portillo, Julián Chicco, Óscar Ureña and Aritz Arambarri. The debut in Butarque ended with a 1-0 defeat to FC Andorra, but this was followed by four successive clean sheets to record the best start in the history of the Second Division (nine points out of a possible twelve), with Diego Conde starting in goal from the third matchday due to the injury of Dani Jiménez. Occupying the promotion places to the First Division, the team briefly reached the top of the table with a victory against Racing de Santander, 2695 days after occupying that position in 2016, and after the biggest win in the Second Division in its history, 6-0 against SD Amorebieta and a show of force at the home of the leaders, RCD Espanyol (0-1), the team would remain at the top for twenty-six consecutive matchdays. Their defensive solidity and goal-scoring efficiency allowed them to maintain a six- to seven-point lead over the team in third place. A run of five straight victories until the 2-1 win over Levante UD gave way to a six-game winless streak that was broken by a dramatic 95th-minute penalty kick win over FC Andorra (2-3), scored by Diego García, after twice trailing by two goals. Meanwhile, in the Copa del Rey, the blue and white were eliminated in the second round by Racing de Ferrol (1-0).

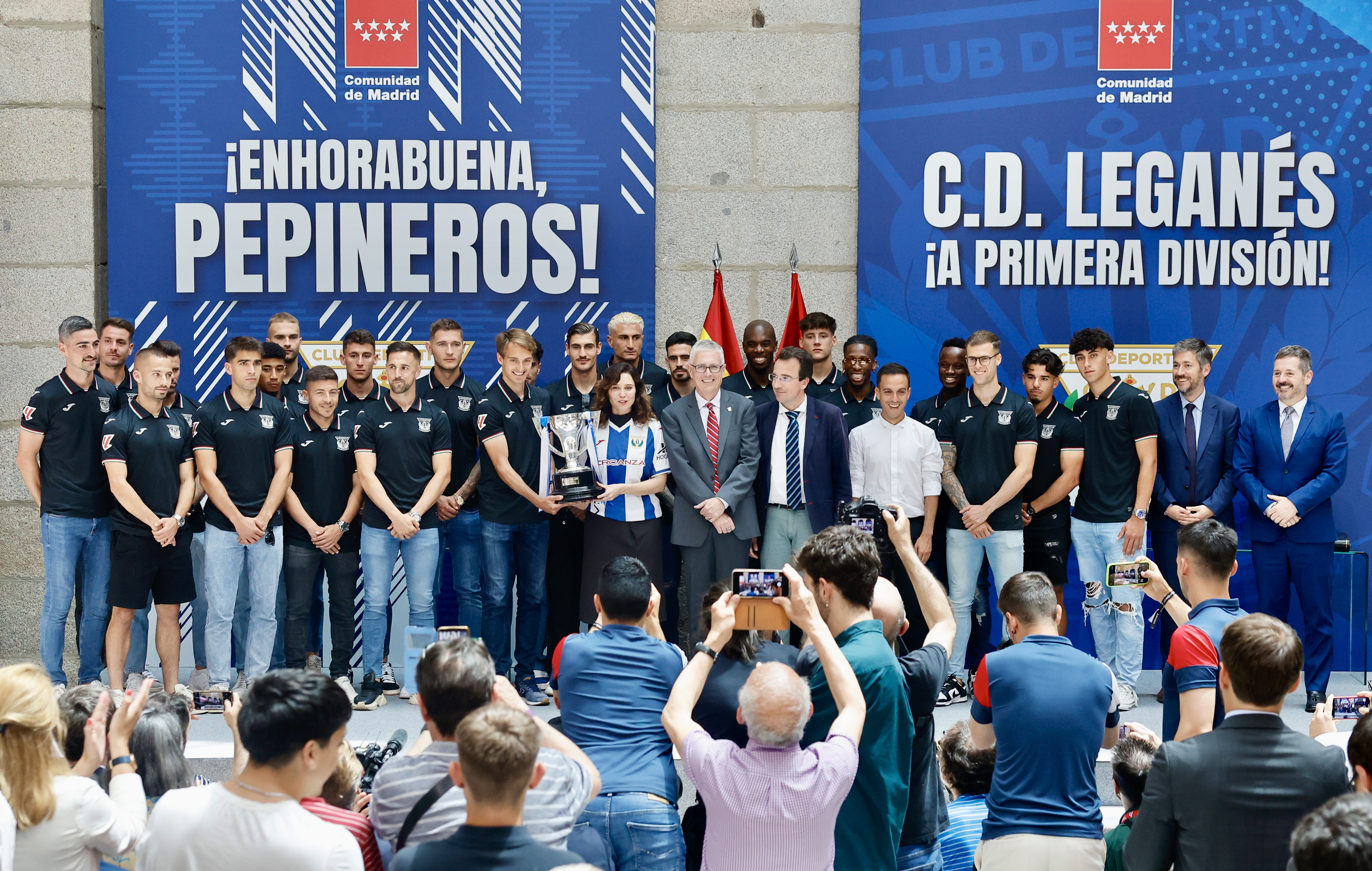
The team that won the 2024 Second Division Championship.

In the winter transfer window, the new signings were Juan Cruz and Darko Brašanac. A new comeback by the leaders, with two goals in two minutes from the two central defenders, Sergio and Jorge, in the dying minutes of the game against Villarreal B, four 0-0 draws in a row and a 1-1 draw, meant that on matchday 37 they shared the lead with Real Valladolid and were only three points ahead of third place SD Eibar. The match against CD Eldense was crucial, as the two teams behind them had both won their matches. Another agonizing 2-1 comeback, with Enric Franquesa scoring in the 93rd minute, kept the pepineros at the top for another matchday. With four games left in the season, a 1-0 defeat at the hands of relegation-threatened Albacete knocked the blue and white out of first place for the first time since matchday 12. A 2-1 win over Sporting put the Madrid team back in first place, with a chance of promotion in the penultimate round match against Racing de Ferrol. For that to happen, Leganés had to win and Eibar had to lose their game. The pepineros twice went ahead on the scoreboard and twice, both times from the penalty spot and in extra time, the Ferrol team managed to equalize, the last penalty coming from a foul by Nyom while protecting a ball that had gone out of bounds. In a matter of minutes, Leganés went from being mathematical champions to playing for promotion on the final day in Butarque (Valladolid won their game in extra time and Eibar lost theirs). On the final day of the season, Leganés faced the team they had defeated to win promotion to the second division in 1993, Elche CF. The Elche team, with many players out and nothing to play for, offered no resistance to a Leganés team that gave everything and scored two goals in the first half (Miguel de la Fuente and Juan Cruz), meaning that the pepineros returned to the elite on June 2, 2024, four seasons after their relegation. In addition, Leganés were crowned Second Division champions for the first time, taking advantage of Valladolid's failure to win, and Diego Conde won the Zamora Trophy. Borja Jiménez was awarded the Miguel Muñoz Trophy. Leganés finished the season with the fewest goals conceded and the highest goal difference (+29).

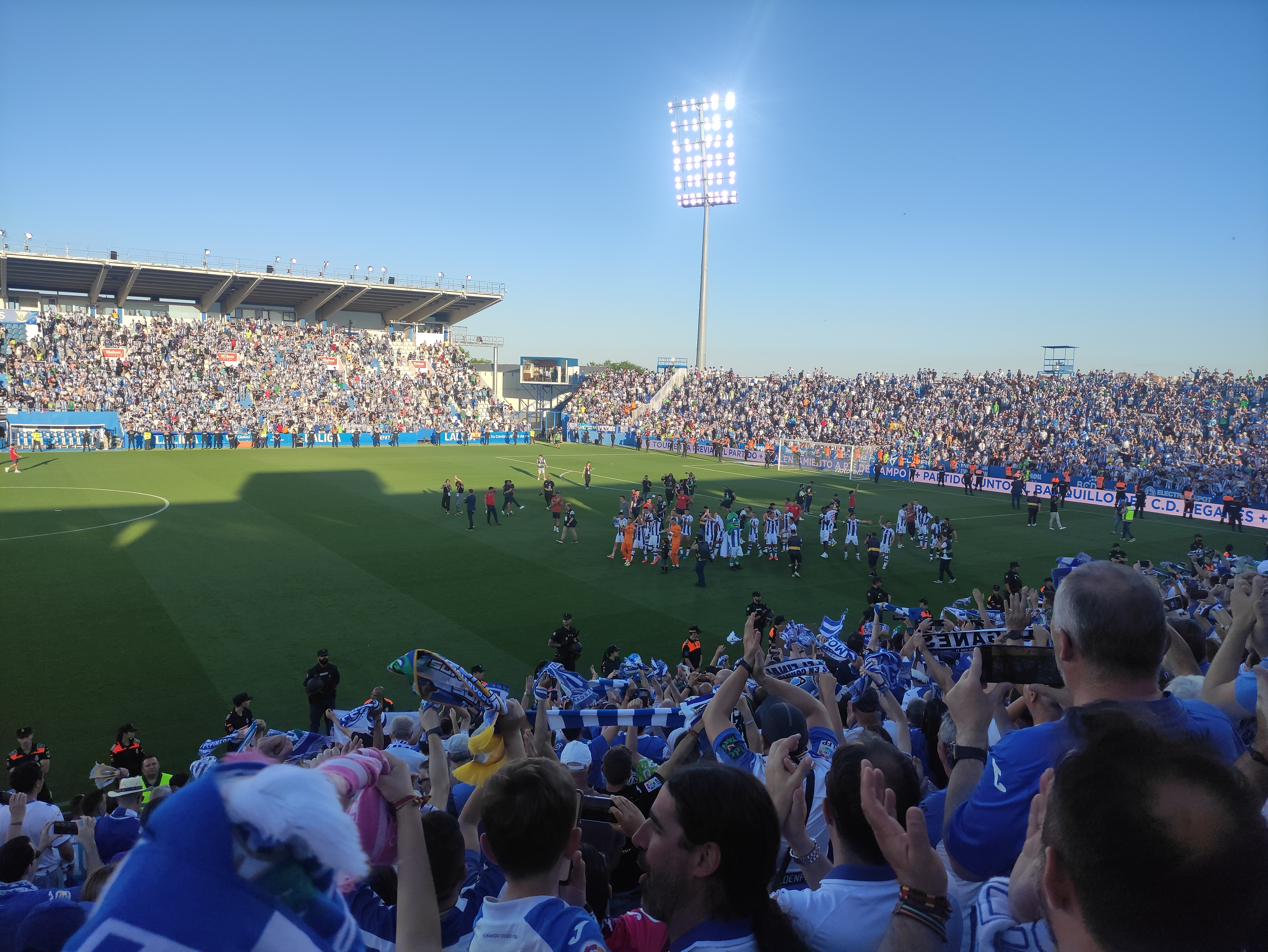
Celebration of the promotion to the First Division achieved against Elche CF in June 2024.

==== Return to the top flight ====
Starting with Borja on the bench and exercising the purchase options for Miguel, Franquesa and Juan Cruz, the squad was strengthened by the return of Javi Hernández, Óscar Rodríguez and Juan Soriano, and the signings of Renato Tapia, Jackson Porozo, Valentin Rosier, Munir El Haddadi and the last-minute acquisition of Sébastien Haller.

== See also ==
- 2024–25 CD Leganés season

== Bibliography ==
- Abanda, Daniel; Aguilera, David (2015). Memorias del Lega [Memoirs of Lega] (in Spanish). Leganés: Vicma Ediciones. p. 270. ISBN 9788460659242.
- Abanda, Daniel; Aguilera, David (2016). Leganés es de Primera [Leganés is in the First Division] (in Spanish). Madrid: Al Poste Ediciones. p. 240. ISBN 9788415726708.
