= Saïd Imigene =

Mauritanian footballer (born 2005)

Personal information
- Date of birth: 16 January 2005 (age 21)
- Place of birth: Riyad, Mauritania
- Height: 1.82 m (6 ft 0 in)
- Position: Centre-back

Team information
- Current team: Leganés B
- Number: 15

Youth career
- Académie FFRIM

Senior career*
Years	Team	Apps	(Gls)
2021–2022	Douanes		
2022–2025	Elite Falcons		
2025–	Leganés B	31	(1)
2025–	Leganés	3	(0)

International career
2021–2024	Mauritania U20		
- * Club domestic league appearances and goals as of 9 June 2026

Saïd Imigene (born 16 January 2005), sometimes known as Said Sy, is a Mauritanian footballer who plays as a centre-back for Spanish club CD Leganés B and the Mauritania national team.

== Club career ==
Born in Riyad, Nouakchott, Imigene played for the youth academy of the Football Federation of the Islamic Republic of Mauritania before joining Douanes in 2021. In the following year, he moved abroad and signed for Elite Falcons in the United Arab Emirates.

On 24 January 2025, Imigene moved to Spain and joined CD Leganés, being initially assigned to the reserves in Tercera Federación. After being a part of the first team squad in the 2025 pre-season, he made his professional debut on 14 September of that year, coming on as a late substitute for Naim García in a 2–0 Segunda División away win over Granada CF.

== International career ==
In November 2021, Imigene was included in Mauritania national under-20 team's 32-man squad for the 2021 UNAF U-20 Tournament. After captaining the side in the following years, he received his first call-up to the full side on 29 August 2024, for two 2025 Africa Cup of Nations qualifiers against Botswana and Cape Verde.
