= Jesús Hernández (footballer, born 2003) =

Spanish footballer

Personal information
- Full name: Jesús Hernández Mesas
- Date of birth: 29 December 2003 (age 22)
- Place of birth: Madrid, Spain
- Height: 1.85 m (6 ft 1 in)
- Positions: Centre-back; midfielder

Team information
- Current team: Degerfors
- Number: 28

Youth career
- 2018–2021: Colmenar Oreja
- 2021–2022: Sitio de Aranjuez

Senior career*
| Years | Team | Apps | (Gls) |
| 2020–2021 | Colmenar Oreja B | | |
| 2020–2021 | Colmenar Oreja | | |
| 2022–2024 | Sitio de Aranjuez | 48 | (6) |
| 2024 | Murcia B | 15 | (3) |
| 2024–2025 | Cartagena B | 13 | (1) |
| 2024–2025 | Cartagena | 5 | (0) |
| 2025–2026 | Juventud Torremolinos | 2 | (0) |
| 2026– | Degerfors | 2 | (0) |
- * Club domestic league appearances and goals as of 8 July 2026

Jesús Hernández Mesas (born 29 December 2003) is a Spanish professional footballer who plays as either a centre-back or a midfielder for Allsvenskan club Degerfors.

== Career ==
Born in Madrid, Hernández played for local sides CD Colmenar de Oreja and CD Sitio de Aranjuez, the latter in Preferente de Madrid. On 10 January 2024, he signed for Real Murcia CF, being assigned to the reserves in Tercera Federación.

On 10 July 2024, Hernández agreed to a contract with another reserve team, FC Cartagena B also in the fifth division. He made his first team – and professional – debut on 14 December, coming on as a second-half substitute for Nikola Šipčić in a 4–1 Segunda División away loss to CD Castellón.
