= Gift Siame =

Zambian footballer

Personal information
- Date of birth: 27 April 2006 (age 20)
- Place of birth: Lusaka, Zambia
- Height: 1.79 m (5 ft 10 in)
- Position: Midfielder

Team information
- Current team: Leganés B
- Number: 22

Youth career
- Sports in Action
- 2021–2024: Atletico Lusaka
- 2024–2025: Leganés

Senior career*
Years	Team	Apps	(Gls)
2025–	Leganés B	10	(3)
2025–	Leganés	0	(0)

International career^{‡}
2025–	Zambia	1	(0)
- * Club domestic league appearances and goals as of 9 June 2026 ‡ National team caps and goals as of 22:41, 14 October 2025 (UTC)

Gift Siame (born 27 April 2006) is a Zambian professional footballer who plays as a midfielder for the Leganés B and the Zambia national team.

== Club career ==
On 12 October 2021, Siame joined the Zambian club Atletico Lusaka. He signed a professional 4-year contract with the Spanish club Leganés on 13 August 2024. He debuted with Leganés in a 4–1 Copa del Rey win over CD Azuaga on 29 October 2025.

== International career ==
Siame was called up to the senior Zambia national team for a set of 2026 FIFA World Cup qualification matches in September 2025.
