= Andrés Campos =

Andrés Campos may refer to:

- Andrés Campos (boxer), full name Andrés Ignacio Campos González, (born 1996), Chilean boxer
- Andrés Campos (fencer), full name Andrés Felipe Campos Zárate (born 1983), Colombian fencer
- Andrés Campos (footballer), full name Andrés Campos Bautista (born 2002), Spanish footballer
