= Suleiman El Haddadi =

Moroccan footballer (born 2006)

Personal information
- Full name: Suleiman El Haddadi Mohamed
- Date of birth: 13 February 2006 (age 20)
- Place of birth: El Escorial, Spain
- Height: 1.85 m (6 ft 1 in)
- Position: Forward

Team information
- Current team: Leganés B
- Number: 9

Youth career
- 2018–2021: Alcorcón
- 2021–2022: Getafe
- 2022–2024: Las Rozas
- 2024–2025: Leganés

Senior career*
Years	Team	Apps	(Gls)
2024–	Leganés B	31	(11)
2025–	Leganés	1	(0)
- * Club domestic league appearances and goals as of 29 August 2026

Suleiman El Haddadi Mohamed (born 13 February 2006), sometimes known as Sule, is a footballer who plays as a forward for Spanish club CD Leganés B. Born in Spain, he is eligible to play for the country or Morocco at international level.

== Career ==
Born in El Escorial, Community of Madrid, El Haddadi joined CD Leganés' youth sides in July 2024, from Las Rozas CF. He made his senior debut with the reserves on 19 October 2024, playing the last 27 minutes of a 0–0 Tercera Federación home draw against RCD Carabanchel.

El Haddadi scored his first senior goal on 27 October 2024, netting the B's first in a 2–2 away draw against CDF Tres Cantos. Definitely promoted to the B-side ahead of the 2025–26 season, he scored braces in a 2–0 win over CF Trival Valderas and in a 7–0 routing of Siello FC; in the latter match, he also provided two assists.

El Haddadi made his first team debut with Lega on 29 October 2025, coming on as a second-half substitute for Álex Millán in a 4–1 away routing of CD Azuaga, for the campaign's Copa del Rey. He made his professional debut on 4 December, starting in a 2–1 home loss to Albacete Balompié, also for the national cup.

== Personal life ==
El Haddadi's older brother Munir is also a footballer and a forward. A FC Barcelona youth graduate, he represented both Spain and Morocco at international level.
