= Queco Piña =

Spanish footballer (born 1980)

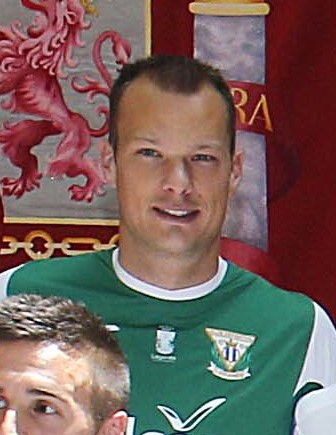
- Piña with Leganés in 2016

Personal information
- Full name: Sergio Piña Cousillas
- Date of birth: 19 July 1980 (age 46)
- Place of birth: A Coruña, Spain
- Height: 1.93 m (6 ft 4 in)
- Position: Goalkeeper

Youth career
- Orillamar
- 1997–1998: Deportivo La Coruña

Senior career*
Years	Team	Apps	(Gls)
1998–2000	Deportivo B	4	(0)
1998–1999	→ Meicende (loan)		
2000–2002	Celta B	6	(0)
2002–2003	Ourense	4	(0)
2003–2004	Lalín	38	(0)
2004–2008	Racing Ferrol	84	(0)
2008–2009	Alicante	17	(0)
2010–2011	Ponferradina	5	(0)
2012	Celta B	14	(1)
2012–2014	Orihuela	28	(0)
2014–2016	Leganés	21	(0)
2016–2017	Huesca	1	(0)
Total		222	(1)
- * Club domestic league appearances and goals

Sergio "Queco" Piña Cousillas (born 17 July 1980) is a Spanish former professional footballer who played as a goalkeeper.

In a 19-year senior career, he appeared in 84 Segunda División matches over seven seasons, representing Racing de Ferrol, Alicante, Ponferradina, Leganés and Huesca.

== Playing career ==
Born in A Coruña, Galicia, Piña finished his youth career with Deportivo de La Coruña, and made his senior debut while on loan to amateurs Sporting Meicende. He returned to the former in summer 1999, and was immediately assigned to the reserves.

Piña signed with another reserve team in 2000, Celta de Vigo B of Segunda División B. Two years later, he moved to CD Ourense also in the third division, being sparingly used in his only season. He then joined Tercera División side CD Lalín in June 2003, where he won the Ricardo Zamora Trophy.

In July 2004, Piña signed for Racing de Ferrol. He played his first game as a professional on 12 March 2005, replacing the injured Miguel Escalona in a 1–2 Segunda División home loss against RC Celta de Vigo. He was handed his first start on 12 June, in a home defeat to Xerez CD (same score).

Piña featured rarely for Racing in his first two seasons, suffering second-tier relegation in the second, but started in the 2006–07 and 2007–08 campaigns, the latter again spent in the division. On 1 September 2008, he joined Alicante CF of the same league, being relegated in his only season.

On 23 June 2010, after more than a year without a club, Piña signed a one-year deal with SD Ponferradina. He returned to Celta in February of the following year, again competing solely with the B side. On 15 April 2012, whilst at the service of the latter, he scored through a goal kick in a 2–2 home draw against Rayo Vallecano B.

On 29 December 2012, Piña moved to Orihuela CF. In January 2014, he joined fellow third-division CD Leganés.

Piña achieved two promotions with the Madrilenians; in the last season, however, he failed to appear in a single match, playing second-fiddle to Jon Ander Serantes. He was released in July 2016 at the end of his contract, and signed with SD Huesca on 5 August.

== Post-retirement ==
On 20 October 2017, Piña returned to Leganés as a goalkeeper coach. He continued to work in that capacity at CD Tenerife, and later as an analyst at Sporting de Gijón.

== Personal life ==
Piña's father, Ramón, was also a footballer. A defender, he played with Deportivo in the 70s/80s.
