= Rafa Muñoz =

Spanish footballer and manager

Personal information
- Full name: Rafael Francisco Muñoz González
- Date of birth: 21 March 1966 (age 60)
- Place of birth: Málaga, Spain
- Position: Midfielder

Youth career
- Málaga

Senior career*
| Years | Team | Apps | (Gls) |
| 1984–1989 | Málaga B | | |
| 1986–1987 | Málaga | 3 | (0) |
| 1989–1993 | Hércules | 117 | (10) |
| 1993–1994 | Málaga | 28 | (1) |
| 1994–1995 | Cartagena | 25 | (3) |
| 1995–1996 | Benidorm | 26 | (0) |
| 1998–1999 | Lorca | | |
| 2001–2002 | Ciudad Murcia | 7 | (0) |
| Total | | 206 | (16) |

Managerial career
- 2002–2004: Ciudad Murcia B
- 2004–2006: Muleño
- 2004–2006: Mazarrón
- 2006–2007: Hércules (youth)
- 2007–2008: Calasparra
- 2008–2009: Baza
- 2009–2010: Sangonera
- 2010–2011: Baza
- 2011: Leganés
- 2011–2012: Totana
- 2013–2015: El Palo
- * Club domestic league appearances and goals

Rafael "Rafa" Francisco Muñoz González (born 21 March 1966) is a Spanish retired footballer who played as a midfielder, and a manager.

== Club career ==
Born in Málaga, Andalusia, Muñoz graduated from CD Málaga's youth setup. He made his senior debuts with the reserves, spending several seasons in the Tercera División.

On 9 November 1986, Muñoz played his first match as a professional, coming on as a second-half substitute in a 1–1 away draw against Hércules CF in the Segunda División. His spell was mainly registered with the B-side, however.

In the 1989 summer, Muñoz moved to Hércules CF, being an ever-present figure during his spell at the club. He subsequently returned to Málaga in 199, and resumed his career in the Segunda División B, but also in the fourth level, representing Cartagena FC, Benidorm CF, Lorca Deportiva CF and Ciudad de Murcia; he retired with the latter in 2002, aged 35.

== Manager career ==
Shortly after retiring, Muñoz started his managerial career at Ciudad de Murcia's reserve team. After spells in Muleño CF and Mazarrón CF, he joined Hércules CF in 2006, taking care of the club's youth setup.

Muñoz returned to the fourth level in February 2007, being appointed Calasparra CF manager. He subsequently coached fellow league team CD Baza before being appointed at Sangonera Atlético CF in the third division.

In 2010, Muñoz returned to Baza, but left in the following transfer window, joining CD Leganés; after only six months, he moved to Club Olímpico de Totana.

On 9 July 2013, Muñoz was appointed at the helm of CD El Palo, helping the club to stay afloat the relegation places during the whole campaign.
