= Jorge Martínez (footballer, born 2007) =

Spanish footballer

Personal information
- Full name: Jorge Martínez Jiménez
- Date of birth: 6 July 2007 (age 19)
- Place of birth: Madrid, Spain
- Positions: Right-back; winger

Team information
- Current team: Leganés B
- Number: 20

Youth career
- 2013–2019: Torrelodones
- 2019–2020: Aravaca
- 2020–2021: Las Rozas
- 2021–2025: Real Madrid
- 2025–2026: Las Rozas

Senior career*
Years	Team	Apps	(Gls)
2025–2026	Las Rozas	13	(2)
2026–	Leganés B	3	(0)
2026–	Leganés	1	(0)
- * Club domestic league appearances and goals as of 13 November 2026

Jorge Martínez Jiménez (born 6 July 2007) is a Spanish footballer who plays as either a right-back or a right winger for CD Leganés B.

== Career ==
Born in Madrid, Martínez joined Real Madrid's La Fábrica in 2021, after representing Las Rozas CF, Aravaca CF and Torrelodones CF. In 2025, he returned to his previous club Las Rozas, and started to feature with the first team in Tercera Federación in December of that year.

On 2 July 2026, Martínez signed a two-year contract with CD Leganés, being initially assigned to the reserves also in the fifth division. He made his first team debut on 10 November, starting in a 1–0 away win over CF Trival Valderas, for the season's Copa del Rey.

Martínez made his professional debut with Lega on 13 November 2026, coming on as a late substitute for Álvaro Tejero in a 3–1 Segunda División home win over Burgos CF.
