= Alfafar =

- Municipality
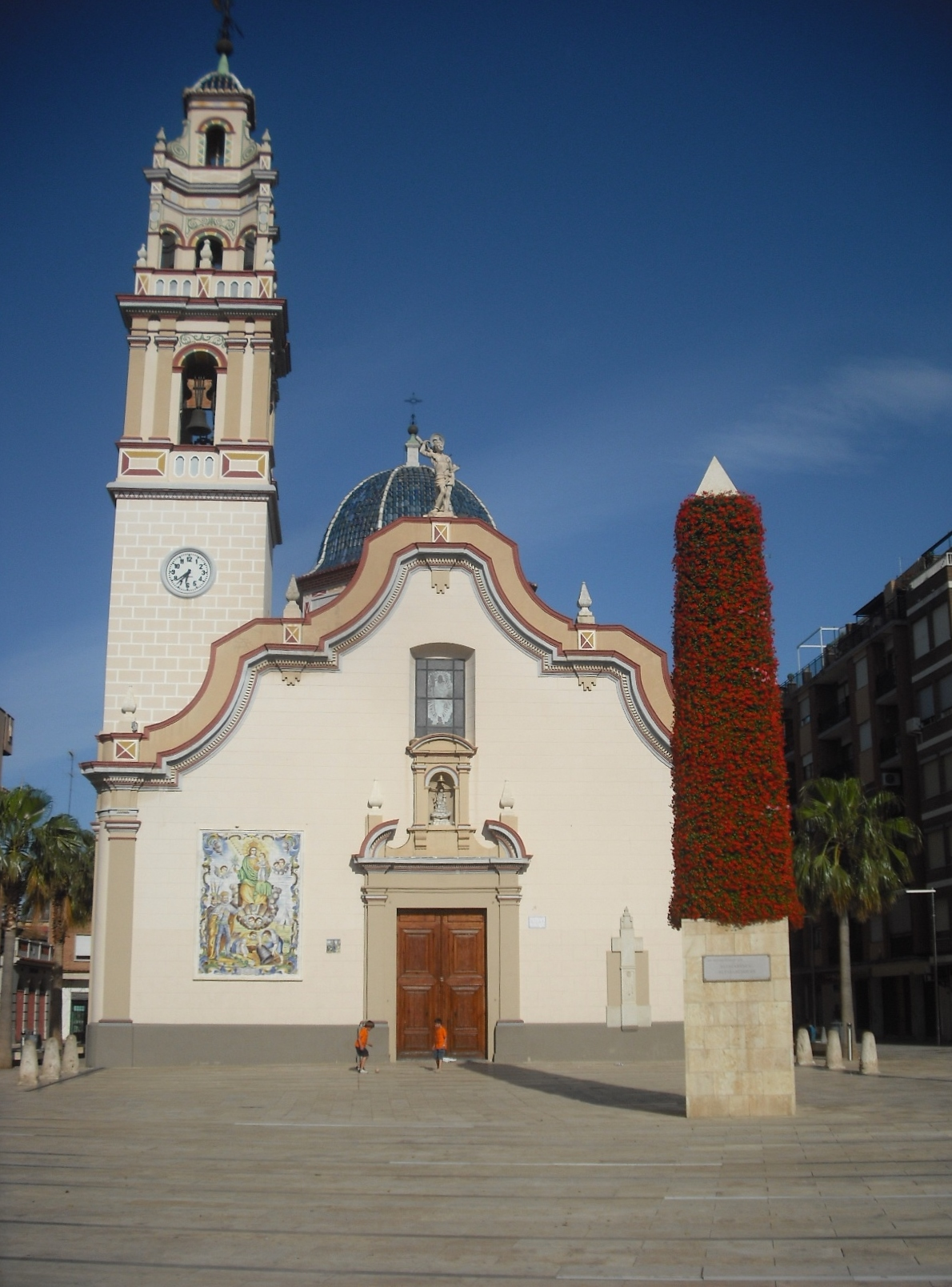

- Coat of arms

- Location in Spain
- Coordinates: 39°25′20″N 0°23′26″W
- Country: Spain
- Autonomous community: Valencian Community
- Province: Valencia
- Comarca: Horta Sud
- Judicial district: Catarroja

Government
  - Alcalde: Juan Ramón Adsuara Monlleó (PP)

Area
  - Total: 10.1 km^{2} (3.9 sq mi)
- Elevation: 6 m (20 ft)

Population (2025-01-01)
  - Total: 22,270
  - Density: 2,200/km^{2} (5,710/sq mi)
- Demonyms: Alfafarenc, alfafarenca
- Time zone: UTC+1 (CET)
  - Summer (DST): UTC+2 (CEST)
- Postal code: 46910
- Official language(s): Valencian
- Website: Official website

Alfafar (Valencian: [alfaˈfaɾ]; Spanish: [alfaˈfaɾ]) is a municipality in the comarca of Horta Sud in the Valencian Community, Spain.

== Notable people ==
- Toni Madrigal (born 1976), footballer raised in Alfafar.

== See also ==
- List of municipalities in Valencia
