= Toni Madrigal =

Spanish footballer (born 1976)

Personal information
- Full name: Antonio Jesús Madrigal Vílchez
- Date of birth: 19 December 1976 (age 49)
- Place of birth: Alicante, Spain
- Height: 1.77 m (5 ft 10 in)
- Position: Forward

Team information
- Current team: Leganés (assistant)

Youth career
- Valencia

Senior career*
Years	Team	Apps	(Gls)
1994–1998	Gimnástico		
1998–2000	Alzira	55	(15)
2000–2001	Terrassa	18	(5)
2001–2004	Novelda	93	(31)
2004	Benidorm	0	(0)
2004–2005	Levante B	36	(9)
2005	Sabadell	12	(0)
2006	Baza	18	(3)
2006–2008	Villajoyosa	54	(11)
2008–2009	Alzira	16	(1)
2009–2011	Novelda		
2011–2012	Catarroja		
Total		302+	(76+)

Managerial career
- 2015: Valladolid B (assistant)
- 2016–2017: Valladolid B (assistant)
- 2017–2019: Celta B (assistant)
- 2019: UCAM Murcia (assistant)
- 2020–2021: Hermannstadt (assistant)
- 2021–2022: Lugo (assistant)
- 2022–2024: Albacete (assistant)
- 2024–2025: Sporting Gijón (assistant)
- 2026: Umm Salal (assistant)
- 2026–: Leganés (assistant)
- * Club domestic league appearances and goals

Antonio Jesús Madrigal Vílchez (born 19 December 1976) is a Spanish former footballer who played as a forward, and the current assistant manager of Leganés.

He played no higher than the Segunda División B, where he totalled 277 games and 68 goals for seven clubs. In the 2002–03 season, he scored a hat-trick in a 3–2 Copa del Rey win for Novelda over Barcelona.

From 2015, Madrigal worked as an assistant manager to Rubén Albés.

== Playing career ==
Madrigal was born in Alicante, and raised in Alfafar near Valencia while his father worked at Ford Valencia Body and Assembly in Almussafes. His father put him on the factory's football team, and the boy signed for Valencia CF's academy when he was 11.

Aged 16 and seeing no progress at Valencia, Madrigal left for Gimnástico before beginning his senior career with Alzira in the Segunda División B in 1999–2000. The following year, he played for Terrassa, before managing to release himself of his contract and move to Novelda in 2001. His performances in his first season at the club earned him a two-year contract extension, albeit with no bonuses for goals.

On 11 September 2002, Barcelona travelled to Novelda in the last 64 of the Copa del Rey; manager Louis van Gaal's side included the likes of Xavi, Juan Román Riquelme and Frank de Boer, with Javier Saviola and Gaizka Mendieta coming on as substitutes. Madrigal scored a hat-trick in a 3–2 win, becoming the first person to net three times against Barcelona in any competition in the 21st century. The players had made deals at half time to swap shirts with their opponents, with Madrigal having Riquelme's, but Barcelona refused to do so at the end of the game and Madrigal went into their changing room to request a shirt, having Mendieta's randomly thrown at him by Gerard López. Madrigal said that he received media attention from as far as Argentina for his feat, but the limited reach of the internet and his lack of an agent meant that he was not transferred to a bigger team; the official physical photographs of the game were obtained by fans before they could be given to the players.

Madrigal went on to play for Levante B, Sabadell, Baza, Villajoyosa, and second spells at Novelda and Alzira. His best season was for Novelda in 2002–03, with 12 goals in the league and 5 in the cup. In 2011, while playing for Catarroja in the Tercera División, he was chosen for the Valencian Community side in the UEFA Regions' Cup.

== Coaching career ==
After retiring in 2012, Madrigal became a fitness coach and assistant manager under former Catarroja manager Rubén Albés. Their clubs included Real Valladolid B, Celta Vigo B, UCAM Murcia, Hermannstadt in Romania, Lugo, Albacete, Sporting Gijón, Umm Salal in Qatar, and Leganés.
