= Naim García =

Spanish association football player

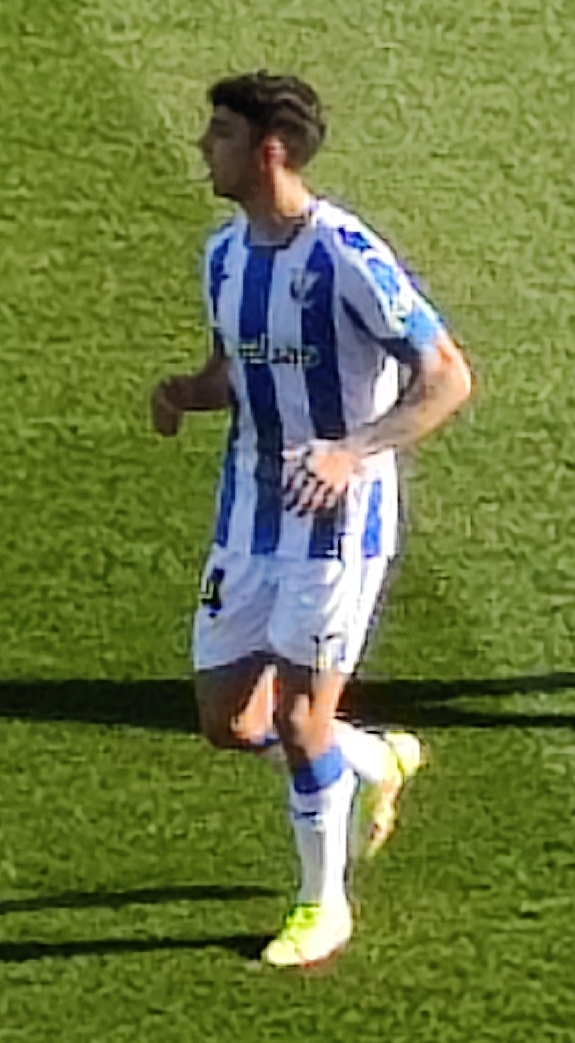
- García with Leganés in 2021

Personal information
- Full name: Naim García García
- Date of birth: 11 June 2002 (age 24)
- Place of birth: Madrid, Spain
- Height: 1.80 m (5 ft 11 in)
- Position: Winger

Team information
- Current team: Leganés
- Number: 17

Youth career
- 2008–2012: Colmenar Oreja
- 2012–2016: Real Madrid
- 2016–2021: Leganés

Senior career*
Years	Team	Apps	(Gls)
2021–	Leganés	84	(5)
2023	→ Ponferradina (loan)	16	(1)
2024	→ Barcelona B (loan)	16	(4)
2025	→ Racing Ferrol (loan)	18	(0)
- * Club domestic league appearances and goals as of 9 June 2026

Naim García García (born 11 June 2002) is a Spanish footballer who plays as a left winger for CD Leganés.

== Career ==
García joined Real Madrid's La Fábrica in 2012, from CD Colmenar de Oreja. In 2016, he left the club and signed for neighbouring CD Leganés.

On 7 March 2019, García signed his first professional contract with the Pepineros. On 14 August 2021, before even having appeared for the reserves, he made his professional debut by starting in a 0–1 Segunda División away loss against Real Sociedad B.

On 7 December 2021, after already being established in the first team squad, García renewed his contract with Leganés until 2027. He scored his first professional goal the following 21 May, netting his team's third in a 3–0 away win over SD Ponferradina.

On 31 January 2023, García was loaned to Ponfe for the remainder of the season. He returned in July, but featured rarely before moving to FC Barcelona Atlètic in Primera Federación on loan on 26 January 2024.

Back to Lega in July 2024, García failed to feature in a single match before moving on loan to Racing de Ferrol in the second division on 21 January 2025.

== Early life ==
Born in Fuencarral-El Pardo, Madrid, García is of Moroccan descent through his father, Yacine Qasmi, and also has Spanish descent through his mother, Soledad García.

== Career statistics ==
=== Club ===
As of match played 12 May 2024

Appearances and goals by club, season and competition
Club	Season	League			Copa del Rey		Other		Total	
Club	Season	Division	Apps	Goals	Apps	Goals	Apps	Goals	Apps	Goals
Leganés	2021–22	Segunda División	24	1	2	1	—		26	2
Leganés	2022–23	Segunda División	15	2	1	0	—		16	2
Leganés	2023–24	Segunda División	10	0	2	0	—		12	0
Leganés	Total		49	3	5	1	0	0	54	4
Ponferradina (loan)	2022–23	Segunda División	16	1	0	0	—		16	1
Barcelona B (loan)	2023–24	Primera Federación	16	4	—		0	0	16	4
Career total			81	8	5	1	0	0	86	9
