= Luis Ángel Duque =

Spanish footballer and manager

Personal information
- Full name: Luis Ángel Duque Mata
- Date of birth: 31 October 1953 (age 72)
- Place of birth: Madrid, Spain

Youth career
- EMT Madrid
- Rayo Vallecano

Senior career*
Years	Team	Apps	(Gls)
- Cartagena
- San Fernando

Managerial career
- Leganés (youth)
- 1989–1995: Leganés
- 1995–1997: Getafe
- 1999–2001: Ávila
- 2001–2003: Compostela
- 2003–2004: Cultural Leonesa
- 2004: Almería
- 2005–2006: Leganés
- 2009–2010: Leganés
- * Club domestic league appearances and goals

Luis Ángel Duque Mata (born 31 October 1953) is a Spanish football manager.

== Managerial career ==
Born in Madrid, Duque began his managerial career with CD Leganés' youth setup, being promoted to the main squad in 1989. After taking the club to Segunda División and narrowly avoiding relegation in the 1994–95 campaign, he was appointed Getafe CF manager in December 1995.

Duque subsequently suffered relegation with Geta in June of the following year, and was relieved from his in May 1997, with the side already out of the promotion zones. In 1999, he was appointed at the helm of Real Ávila CF, and subsequently managed SD Compostela and Cultural y Deportiva Leonesa, all in Segunda División B.

On 2 February 2004, Duque was named UD Almería manager. He was sacked on 5 April, with the club nearing the relegation zones.

In the 2005 summer Duque returned to his first club Leganés, managing the side during most of the 2005–06 campaign. He was later the club's sports director, eventually returning as manager in July 2009.

On 22 March 2010, Duque stepped down as manager, returning to his previous position. He left Lega in the end of the season.
