= Luis Sánchez Duque =

Spanish footballer and manager

Personal information
- Full name: Luis Sánchez Duque
- Date of birth: 13 November 1956 (age 69)
- Place of birth: Getafe, Spain
- Height: 1.75 m (5 ft 9 in)

Senior career*
Years	Team	Apps	(Gls)
- Tarancón
1984–1988	Getafe Deportivo		

Managerial career
- 1993–1995: Getafe
- 1995–1997: Leganés
- 1997: Albacete
- 1998–1999: Leganés
- 1999–2000: Toledo
- 2001: Córdoba
- 2001–2002: Numancia
- 2004–2005: Tomelloso
- 2005–2007: Valencia B
- 2007: Valencia (assistant)
- * Club domestic league appearances and goals

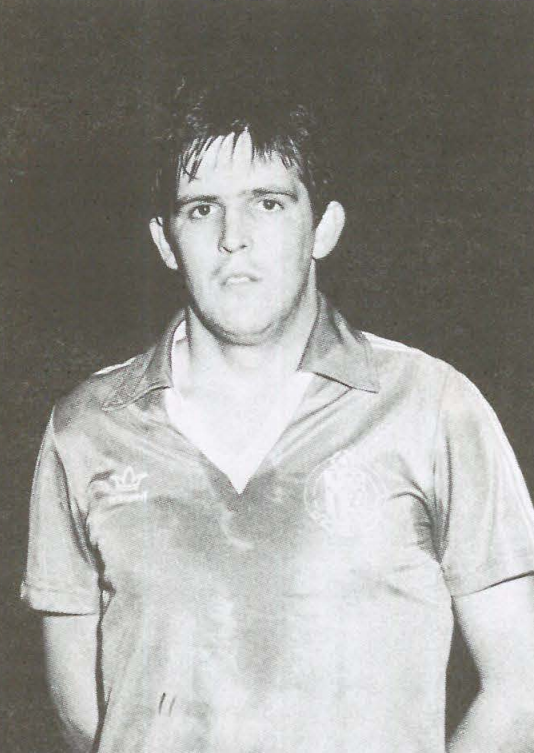
Luis Sanchez Duque in 1985

Luis Sánchez Duque (born 13 November 1956) is a Spanish football manager.

== Manager career ==
Born in Getafe, Madrid, Sánchez Duque began his managerial career with Getafe CF in 1993, after already representing the club's predecessor as a player in the 80's. He achieved a promotion to Segunda División in his first season in charge, but was sacked in May 1995.

Sánchez Duque was subsequently appointed CD Leganés manager, managing to stay two seasons in the second level. In the 1997 summer he was named Albacete Balompié manager, but was relieved from his duties in October.

In December 1999, after one season back at Leganés, Sánchez Duque was appointed at the helm of CD Toledo. He eventually left the club in the following year, after suffering team relegation.

On 23 December 2000, Sánchez Duque was appointed Córdoba CF manager. On 1 March of the following year, after only eight matches, he was sacked.

On 27 November 2001, Sánchez Duque joined CD Numancia. On 17 February 2002, he was sacked, shortly after confirming his continuity in a press conference.

Sánchez Duque subsequently managed Tomelloso CF and Valencia CF Mestalla, being later assistant of the latter's main squad. He stepped down from his job in April 2007, after suffering a cardiac arrhythmia.
