= CD Leganés B =

Association football club in Leganés, Spain

Leganés B
- Full name: Club Deportivo Leganés "B"
- Nicknames: Pepineros, Legamar
- Founded: 1959; 67 years ago
- Ground: Instalación Deportiva Butarque, Leganés, Madrid, Spain
- Capacity: 1,750
- President: Jeff Luhnow
- Head coach: Abraham García
- League: Tercera Federación – Group 7
- 2025–26: Tercera Federación – Group 5, 5th of 18
Home colours	Away colours	Third colours

Club Deportivo Leganés B is a Spanish football team from Leganés, in the Madrid outskirts. They are the reserve team of CD Leganés. They play in white shirts with blue stripes, and white shorts. Their home stadium is the Instalación Deportiva Butarque.

== Season to season ==
- As AD Legamar

Season	Tier	Division	Place	Copa del Rey
1966–67	6	3ª Reg.	1st	
1967–68	5	2ª Reg.	6th	
1968–69	5	2ª Reg.	10th	
1969–70	5	2ª Reg.	9th	
1970–71	5	2ª Reg.	18th	
1971–72	7	3ª Reg.	6th	
1972–73	7	3ª Reg.	5th	
1973–74	7	3ª Reg. P.	5th	
1974–75	7	3ª Reg. P.	6th	
1975–76	6	2ª Reg.	5th	
1976–77	6	2ª Reg.	3rd	
1977–78	6	1ª Reg.	6th	
1978–79	6	1ª Reg.	6th	

Season	Tier	Division	Place	Copa del Rey
1979–80	6	1ª Reg.	14th	
1980–81	6	1ª Reg.	8th	
1981–82	6	1ª Reg.	12th	
1982–83	6	1ª Reg.	2nd	
1983–84	5	Reg. Pref.	7th	
1984–85	5	Reg. Pref.	15th	
1985–86	6	1ª Reg.	2nd	
1986–87	5	Reg. Pref.	10th	
1987–88	5	Reg. Pref.	9th	
1988–89	5	Reg. Pref.	4th	
1989–90	5	Reg. Pref.	10th	
1990–91	5	Reg. Pref.	3rd	

- As CD Leganés' reserve team

Season	Tier	Division	Place
1991–92	5	Reg. Pref.	6th
1992–93	5	Reg. Pref.	2nd
1993–94	4	3ª	8th
1994–95	4	3ª	4th
1995–96	3	2ª B	16th
1996–97	4	3ª	4th
1997–98	3	2ª B	20th
1998–99	4	3ª	2nd
1999–2000	4	3ª	10th
2000–01	4	3ª	13th
2001–02	4	3ª	8th
2002–03	4	3ª	9th
2003–04	4	3ª	12th
2004–05	4	3ª	14th
2005–06	4	3ª	19th
2006–07	5	Reg. Pref.	14th
2007–08	5	Reg. Pref.	17th
2008–09	6	1ª Reg.	2nd
2009–10	5	Pref.	10th
2010–11	5	Pref.	7th

Season	Tier	Division	Place
2011–12	5	Pref.	4th
2012–13	5	Pref.	8th
2013–14	5	Pref.	10th
2014–15	5	Pref.	8th
2015–16	5	Pref.	2nd
2016–17	4	3ª	5th
2017–18	4	3ª	12th
2018–19	4	3ª	9th
2019–20	4	3ª	6th
2020–21	4	3ª	1st / 1st
2021–22	4	2ª RFEF	7th
2022–23	4	2ª Fed.	14th
2023–24	5	3ª Fed.	3rd
2024–25	5	3ª Fed.	8th
2025–26	5	3ª Fed.	5th
2026–27	5	3ª Fed.	

- 2 seasons in Segunda División B
- 2 seasons in Segunda Federación/Segunda División RFEF
- 16 seasons in Tercera División
- 4 seasons in Tercera Federación

== Current squad ==
As of 19 September 2026.

Note: Flags indicate national team as defined under FIFA eligibility rules; some limited exceptions apply. Players may hold more than one non-FIFA nationality.

No.	Pos.	Nation	Player
1	GK	ESP	Ale Gorrín
2	DF	ESP	Carlos de Miguel
3	DF	ESP	Diego Pérez
4	DF	ESP	Teo Bou
5	DF	ESP	Guille Burcio
6	MF	ESP	Jorge Herrero
7	MF	UGA	Sulaiman Mulumba
8	MF	ESP	Álvaro González
9	FW	MAR	Suleiman El Haddadi
10	MF	ESP	Yuri Menac
11	MF	ESP	Jairo Fernández
12	DF	ESP	Hugo García
14	MF	SEN	Rassoul Camara
15	DF	MTN	Saïd Imigene
16	FW	ESP	Mariano Villafáfila

No.	Pos.	Nation	Player
17	MF	SEN	Modou Alpha Ndiaye
18	MF	ESP	Álvaro Moreno
19	FW	ESP	Carlos Muñoz
20	DF	ESP	Jorge Martínez
21	MF	ESP	Noé Pérez
22	MF	ZAM	Gift Siame
23	MF	ESP	Iker Bachiller
24	DF	ESP	Álex Fita
26	MF	ESP	Carlos Belda
27	FW	ESP	Iker Chaparro
29	DF	ESP	Samuel Almarza
31	GK	ESP	Nico Lozano
32	FW	SEN	Mamadou Sawané
41	GK	ESP	Javier Garrote
—	DF	ESP	Marcos Leiva

=== Reserve team ===
Note: Flags indicate national team as defined under FIFA eligibility rules; some limited exceptions apply. Players may hold more than one non-FIFA nationality.

No.	Pos.	Nation	Player

== Club officials ==
=== Current technical staff ===
Position	Staff
Head coach	(Spain) José Luis Capdevila
Assistant manager	(Spain) Carlos Díaz Mindán
Technical assistant	(Spain) Samuel Pérez
Fitness coach	(Spain) Daniel Sanz (Spain) Alejandro Díaz
Goalkeeping coach	(Spain) Alberto González
Delegate	(Spain) Héctor Fajardo
Equipment manager	(Spain) Sergio Rodríguez
Physiotherapist	(Spain) David Briones
Rehab fitness coach	(Spain) Miguel Marín
Nutritionist	(South Korea) Jeongchan Lee

Last updated: 21 September 2022
Source: CD Leganés (in Spanish)
