= Andrés Campos (footballer) =

Spanish footballer

Personal information
- Full name: Andrés Campos Bautista
- Date of birth: 14 May 2002 (age 24)
- Place of birth: Las Palmas, Spain
- Height: 1.78 m (5 ft 10 in)
- Position: Winger

Team information
- Current team: Leganés
- Number: 21

Youth career
- 2007–2012: Unión Viera
- 2012–2016: Las Palmas
- 2016–2018: Villarreal
- 2018–2019: Roda
- 2019–2021: Villarreal

Senior career*
Years	Team	Apps	(Gls)
2020–2022	Villarreal C	40	(1)
2022–2023	RSC Internacional	29	(7)
2023–2024	Real Madrid C	28	(7)
2024–2025	Real Madrid B	17	(0)
2025–	Leganés	4	(0)
- * Club domestic league appearances and goals as of 9 June 2026

Andrés Campos Bautista (born 14 May 2002) is a Spanish professional footballer who plays mainly as a left winger for CD Leganés.

== Club career ==
Born in Las Palmas, Canary Islands, Campos played for CF Unión Viera and UD Las Palmas before joining the youth sides of Villarreal CF in June 2016. He made his senior debut with the C-team on 31 October 2020, coming on as a second-half substitute in a 3–3 Tercera División away draw against Atlético Saguntino.

Campos subsequently failed to establish himself as a regular starter for the C's, and left the club to join the structure of Real Madrid in August 2022; he was initially assigned to farm team RSC Internacional FC in Tercera Federación.

Ahead of the 2023–24 season, Campos became a full member of the Real Madrid C squad. After appearing with the reserves in the 2024 pre-season, he first appeared with the side on 24 August of that year, starting in a 1–0 Primera Federación away loss to Marbella FC.

On 26 June 2025, Campos signed a two-year deal with Segunda División side CD Leganés.

== International career ==
On 17 November 2017, Campos was called up to the Spain national under-16 team for a period of trainings.
