= CD Colmenar de Oreja =

Spanish football club

Colmenar de Oreja
- Full name: Club Deportivo Colmenar de Oreja
- Founded: 1976
- Ground: Estadio Municipal, Colmenar de Oreja; Community of Madrid, Spain
- Capacity: 2,000
- Chairman: (Spain) Rubén Reyeros
- Manager: (Spain) Rafa
- League: Segunda de Aficionados – Group 6
- 2024–25: Segunda de Aficionados – Group 8, 3rd of 15
Home colours	Away colours

Club Deportivo Colmenar de Oreja is a Spanish football team from Colmenar de Oreja, in the Community of Madrid. Founded on 1976, they currently play in Segunda de Aficionados – Group 6.

== Season to season ==
Season	Tier	Division	Place	Copa del Rey
1977–78	9	3ª Reg.	5th	
1978–79	9	3ª Reg.	1st	
1979–80	8	3ª Reg. P.	1st	
1980–81	7	2ª Reg.	1st	
1981–82	6	1ª Reg.	5th	
1982–83	6	1ª Reg.	7th	
1983–84	6	1ª Reg.	3rd	
1984–85	6	1ª Reg.	15th	
1985–86	7	2ª Reg.	10th	
1986–87	7	2ª Reg.	3rd	
1987–88	6	1ª Reg.	6th	
1988–89	6	1ª Reg.	3rd	
1989–90	6	1ª Reg.	3rd	
1990–91	6	1ª Reg.	7th	
1991–92	6	1ª Reg.	9th	
1992–93	6	1ª Reg.	14th	
1993–94	6	1ª Reg.	4th	
1994–95	6	1ª Reg.	14th	
1995–96	6	1ª Reg.	1st	
1996–97	5	Reg. Pref.	16th	

Season	Tier	Division	Place	Copa del Rey
1997–98	6	1ª Reg.	10th	
1998–99	6	1ª Reg.	13th	
1999–2000	6	1ª Reg.	8th	
2000–01	6	1ª Reg.	17th	
2001–02	7	2ª Reg.	4th	
2002–03	7	2ª Reg.	1st	
2003–04	6	1ª Reg.	4th	
2004–05	6	1ª Reg.	10th	
2005–06	6	1ª Reg.	4th	
2006–07	6	1ª Reg.	3rd	
2007–08	5	Reg. Pref.	6th	
2008–09	5	Reg. Pref.	11th	
2009–10	5	Pref.	8th	
2010–11	5	Pref.	11th	
2011–12	5	Pref.	10th	
2012–13	5	Pref.	7th	
2013–14	5	Pref.	15th	
2014–15	6	1ª Afic.	3rd	
2015–16	6	1ª Afic.	3rd	
2016–17	6	1ª Afic.	2nd	

Season	Tier	Division	Place	Copa del Rey
2017–18	5	Pref.	15th	
2018–19	6	1ª Afic.	9th	
2019–20	6	1ª Afic.	3rd	
2020–21	6	1ª Afic.	14th	
2021–22	8	2ª Afic.	14th	
2022–23	8	2ª Afic.	13th	
2023–24	8	2ª Afic.	16th	
2024–25	9	2ª Afic.	3rd	
2025–26	9	2ª Afic.		

- 16 seasons in Tercera División

== Stadium ==
Their home stadium is the Estadio Municipal San Juan, which seats 2,000 spectators.
