= CD Leganés =

Association football club in Spain

Leganés
- Full name: Club Deportivo Leganés, S.A.D.
- Nicknames: Los Pepineros (The Cucumber Growers); El Lega
- Founded: 23 June 1928; 98 years ago
- Stadium: Estadio Ontime Butarque
- Capacity: 14,500
- Owner: 885 Capital
- President: Eduardo Cosín
- Head coach: Luis Carrión
- League: Segunda División
- 2025–26: Segunda División, 16th of 22
- Website: cdleganes.com
Home colours	Away colours

Club Deportivo Leganés, S.A.D. is a professional football club based in Leganés, Community of Madrid. They currently compete in Segunda División. Leganés was officially founded 23 June 1928 and played their first season in the 6th division of Spanish football. The club's stadium, the Estadio Municipal Butarque, was built in 1998, after moving from the Luis Rodríguez de Miguel, a stadium they had played in since 1966.

Leganés holds home games at the Estadio Municipal de Butarque, which seats 14,500 spectators.

== History ==
=== Lower leagues (1928–1992) ===
The club was officially founded on 23 June 1928, when a meeting happened in Madrid. Its first president was Ramón del Hierro. However the club had to suspend operations in 1936 due to the Spanish civil war, where they remained inactive until they reformed on 4 September 1946.

Leganés played the vast majority of its existence in the lower leagues. In 1977 the club regained promotion to the fourth division, where it had played before for seven years when the category was still the third level.

=== Third and second divisions (1992–2016) ===
After a steady progression, Leganés reached the new division three in 1987, being promoted to the second division six years later and maintaining its league status for 11 seasons; during this timeframe, it collected two consecutive eighth places (best) from 1995 to 1997.

On 24 December 2008, Victoria Pavón and Felipe Moreno acquired a majority stake of the club. Since July 2009, Victoria Pavón has been the president of the club.

In the 2013–14 season, Leganés was promoted to Segunda División after 10 seasons in Segunda B.

=== La Liga promotions (2016–present) ===
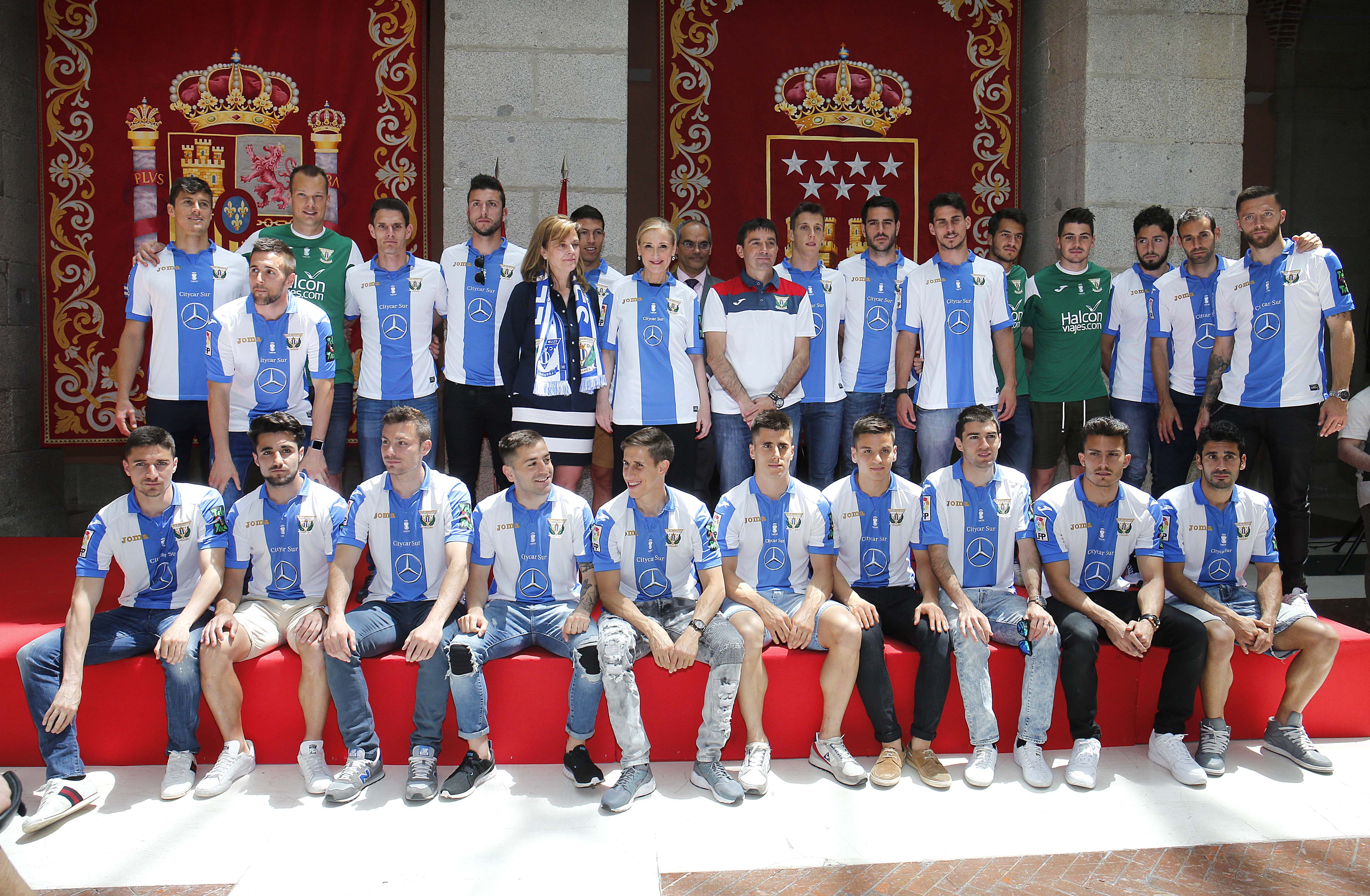
The squad that earned promotion to La Liga in 2016 paying a visit to the regional government

Chart of CD Leganés league performance 1929-present

In the 2015–16 season, for the first time in their history, Leganés earned promotion to La Liga, which was sealed on 4 June 2016 with a 1–0 away win against CD Mirandés, thus becoming the fifth team from Community of Madrid ever to play in La Liga, after Real Madrid, Atlético Madrid, Rayo Vallecano and Getafe. They remained in the top flight for four seasons, reaching a peak of 13th in 2018–19, before relegation in the last game of the following season, a 2–2 home draw with Real Madrid. During this spell, the team qualified for the first time to the semifinals of the Copa del Rey, by eliminating Real Madrid in the quarterfinals thanks to a 2–1 win at Santiago Bernabéu Stadium. In 2017, Leganés planned to change their name to "Leganés Madrid" to aid putting them "on the map".

In the 2023–24 season, Leganes won Segunda Division and were promoted to La Liga, thus returning after a four-season absence. They were immediately relegated back to Segunda in the 2024-25 season.

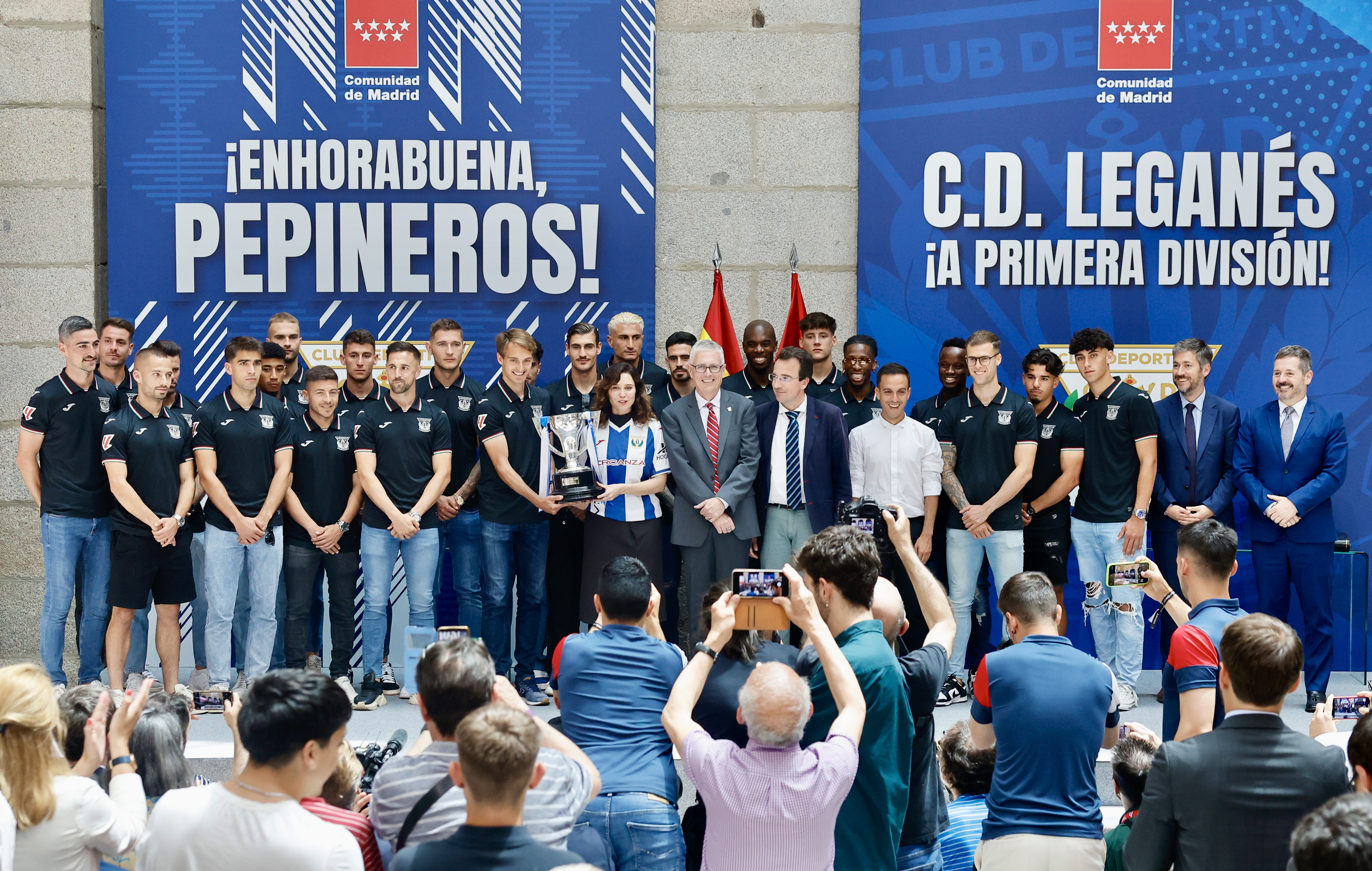
The squad that won La Liga in 2024 paying a visit to the regional government.

== Fans ==
The fans have friendly relation with ultras group Gate 12 of Egaleo FC, the towns of Egaleo and Leganés happen to be twinned too. They also have friendly ties with Reading F.C. of England, partially due to sharing their blue and white colours. Their biggest rival is Getafe with whom they contest the South Madrid derby.

== Season to season ==
Season	Tier	Division	Place	Copa del Rey
1929–30	6	2ª Reg.	1st / 1st	
1930–31	5	2ª Reg. P.	1st	
1931–32	5	2ª Reg. P.		
1932–33	5	2ª Reg. P.		
1933–34	5	2ª Reg. P.		
1934–1946	DNP			
1946–47	6	2ª Reg.	5th	
1947–48	6	2ª Reg.	1st	
1948–49	5	2ª Reg. P.	2nd	
1949–50	4	1ª Reg.	4th	
1950–51	4	1ª Reg.	13th	
1951–52	4	1ª Reg.	7th	
1952–53	4	1ª Reg.	3rd	
1953–54	4	1ª Reg.	1st	
1954–55	3	3ª	5th	
1955–56	3	3ª	4th	
1956–57	3	3ª	13th	
1957–58	3	3ª	12th	
1958–59	3	3ª	13th	
1959–60	3	3ª	16th	

Season	Tier	Division	Place	Copa del Rey
1960–61	4	1ª Reg.	12th	
1961–62	5	2ª Reg.	2nd	
1962–63	4	1ª Reg.	4th	
1963–64	3	3ª	13th	
1964–65	3	3ª	16th	
1965–66	4	1ª Reg.	5th	
1966–67	4	1ª Reg.	3rd	
1967–68	3	3ª	17th	
1968–69	4	1ª Reg.	8th	
1969–70	4	1ª Reg.	4th	
1970–71	4	1ª Reg.	7th	
1971–72	4	1ª Reg.	10th	
1972–73	4	1ª Reg.	9th	
1973–74	4	Reg. Pref.	10th	
1974–75	5	1ª Reg.	1st	
1975–76	4	Reg. Pref.	6th	
1976–77	4	Reg. Pref.	1st	
1977–78	4	3ª	16th	Second round
1978–79	4	3ª	3rd	First round
1979–80	4	3ª	11th	First round

Season	Tier	Division	Place	Copa del Rey
1980–81	4	3ª	6th	
1981–82	4	3ª	6th	First round
1982–83	4	3ª	16th	First round
1983–84	4	3ª	7th	
1984–85	4	3ª	3rd	
1985–86	4	3ª	1st	Second round
1986–87	4	3ª	3rd	First round
1987–88	3	2ª B	7th	Second round
1988–89	3	2ª B	8th	Third round
1989–90	3	2ª B	3rd	
1990–91	3	2ª B	5th	Second round
1991–92	3	2ª B	8th	Third round
1992–93	3	2ª B	1st	Second round
1993–94	2	2ª	15th	Fourth round
1994–95	2	2ª	19th	Fourth round
1995–96	2	2ª	8th	Third round
1996–97	2	2ª	8th	Second round
1997–98	2	2ª	13th	First round
1998–99	2	2ª	17th	Second round
1999–2000	2	2ª	13th	First round

Season	Tier	Division	Place	Copa del Rey
2000–01	2	2ª	17th	Round of 16
2001–02	2	2ª	14th	Round of 64
2002–03	2	2ª	19th	Round of 64
2003–04	2	2ª	19th	Round of 32
2004–05	3	2ª B	5th	Round of 64
2005–06	3	2ª B	13th	Preliminary round
2006–07	3	2ª B	8th	
2007–08	3	2ª B	12th	
2008–09	3	2ª B	4th	
2009–10	3	2ª B	5th	First round
2010–11	3	2ª B	4th	First round
2011–12	3	2ª B	12th	Second round
2012–13	3	2ª B	2nd	
2013–14	3	2ª B	2nd	Third round
2014–15	2	2ª	10th	Second round
2015–16	2	2ª	2nd	Round of 32
2016–17	1	1ª	17th	Round of 32
2017–18	1	1ª	17th	Semi-finals
2018–19	1	1ª	13th	Round of 16
2019–20	1	1ª	18th	Round of 16

Season	Tier	Division	Place	Copa del Rey
2020–21	2	2ª	3rd	Round of 32
2021–22	2	2ª	12th	Round of 32
2022–23	2	2ª	14th	First round
2023–24	2	2ª	1st	Second round
2024–25	1	1ª	18th	Quarter-finals
2025–26	2	2ª	16th	Second round
2026–27	2	2ª		TBD

- 5 seasons in La Liga
- 19 seasons in Segunda División
- 16 seasons in Segunda División B
- 19 seasons in Tercera División

== Current squad ==
As of 1 September 2026

Note: Flags indicate national team as defined under FIFA eligibility rules; some limited exceptions apply. Players may hold more than one non-FIFA nationality.

No.	Pos.	Nation	Player
1	GK	ESP	Raúl Fernández
2	DF	ESP	Marvel
3	DF	ESP	Javi Montero
4	DF	ESP	Rubén Pulido
5	DF	ESP	Ignasi Miquel (3rd captain)
6	DF	ESP	Lalo Aguilar
7	DF	ESP	Rubén Peña (captain)
8	MF	MAR	Yassine Kechta
9	FW	ESP	Álex Millán
10	MF	NED	Zico Buurmeester
11	DF	ESP	Naim García
13	GK	ALG	Luca Zidane

No.	Pos.	Nation	Player
14	MF	ESP	Dani Rodríguez
15	DF	ESP	Enric Franquesa (vice-captain)
16	FW	ESP	Unax del Cura
17	MF	TUN	Ismaël Gharbi (on loan from Braga)
18	MF	ESP	Andrés Campos
19	FW	CMR	Patrick Soko (on loan from Almería)
20	MF	ESP	Miguel Atienza
21	FW	ESP	Álvaro Morata (on loan from Como)
22	MF	ESP	Álex Sancris (on loan from Getafe)
23	DF	ESP	Álvaro Tejero
24	MF	GUI	Amadou Diawara

=== Reserve team ===
Note: Flags indicate national team as defined under FIFA eligibility rules; some limited exceptions apply. Players may hold more than one non-FIFA nationality.

No.	Pos.	Nation	Player
28	DF	ESP	Álex Fita
31	GK	ESP	Nico Lozano
32	FW	MAR	Suleiman El Haddadi
33	MF	ESP	Jorge Herrero

No.	Pos.	Nation	Player
36	MF	UGA	Sulaiman Mulumba
38	GK	ESP	Ale Gorrín
39	DF	ESP	Jorge Martínez
40	DF	ESP	Diego Pérez

=== Out on loan ===
Note: Flags indicate national team as defined under FIFA eligibility rules; some limited exceptions apply. Players may hold more than one non-FIFA nationality.

No.	Pos.	Nation	Player
—	GK	ESP	Javi Garrido (at Coria until 30 June 2027)
—	DF	SEN	Djibril Gueye (at Sporting CP B until 30 June 2027)
—	DF	ESP	Javi Hernández (at Cerezo Osaka until 30 June 2027)
—	DF	BOL	Lucas Macazaga (at Ponferradina until 30 June 2027)
—	DF	ESP	Marco Leiton (at Coria until 30 June 2027)
—	DF	URU	Sebastián Figueredo (at Iberia 1999 until 30 June 2027)

No.	Pos.	Nation	Player
—	DF	ESP	Víctor Rodríguez (at Cacereño until 30 June 2027)
—	MF	ESP	Carlos Guirao (at Eldense until 30 June 2027)
—	MF	ESP	Juan Cruz (at Málaga until 30 June 2027)
—	MF	BEL	Benjamin Pauwels (at Casa Pia until 30 June 2027)
—	FW	DEN	Alfred Gøthler (at Extremadura until 30 June 2027)
—	DF	ZAM	David Hamansenya (at Slovan Liberec until 30 June 2027)

== Club officials ==
=== Current technical staff ===
Position	Staff
Head coach	(Spain) Luis Carrión
Assistant coach	(Spain) Toni Madrigal
Analyst	(Spain) Iván Cabezudo
Fitness coach	(Spain) Aníbal González
Goalkeeping coach	(Spain) Juanjo Valencia
Materials manager	(Spain) Sergio Rodríguez (Spain) Rubén Escaso (Spain) Daniel Pozuelo
Doctor	(Spain) Alberto Lam
Physiotherapist	(Spain) Sergio Hontoria (Spain) Carlos Carballo (Spain) Diego Manzano (Spain) Carlos Elvira
Rehab fitness coach	(Spain) Alberto Galisteo (Spain) Gonzalo Fernández
Nutritionist	(Guatemala) Kevin Ardón

Last updated: 11 August 2026
Source: CD Leganés (in Spanish)

=== Board of directors ===
Office	Name
President	Eduardo Cosín
Sporting director	Andrés Pardo
Secretary	Scott Graeme
Delegation	David Monjo
General director	Martín Ortega
Financial director	Andrew Hutchinson
Security director	Stuart McLean
Communication, marketing and social director	Victor Marín
Medical director	Edward Stevens
Academy director	Gary Barnett

Last updated: 9 April 2019
Source: CD Leganés

== Honours ==
- Segunda División: 2023–24
- Segunda División B: 1992–93
- Tercera División: 1985–86

== Famous players ==
Note: this list includes players that have played at least 100 league games and have reached international status.

- (Algeria) Luca Zidane
- (Argentina) José Chamot
- (Argentina) Federico Domínguez
- (Argentina) Martín Mantovani
- (Argentina) Jonathan Silva
- (Cameroon) Samuel Eto'o
- (Cameroon) Allan Nyom
- (Cameroon) Pierre Webó
- (Chile) Bryan Rabello
- (Denmark) Martin Braithwaite
- (Equatorial Guinea) Chupe
- (Equatorial Guinea) Iván Zarandona
- (France) Julián Ronda
- (Greece) Dimitris Siovas
- (Ivory Coast) Yan Diomande
- (Morocco) Nabil El Zhar
- (Morocco) Youssef En-Nesyri
- (Morocco) Nordin Amrabat
- (Mexico) Diego Reyes
- (Nigeria) Christopher Ohen
- (Nigeria) Kenneth Omeruo
- (Portugal) Ariza Makukula
- (Portugal) Paulo Torres
- (Russia) Andrei Mokh
- (Saudi Arabia) Yahya Al-Shehri
- (Spain) Alberto
- (Spain) Alfredo
- (Spain) Raúl Arribas
- (Spain) Unai Bustinza
- (Spain) Catanha
- (Spain) Iván Cuéllar
- (Spain) Javier Eraso
- (Spain) Óscar Fernández
- (Spain) Rubén Falcón
- (Spain) Jordi Lardín
- (Spain) Pedro Largo
- (Spain) Carlos Martínez
- (Spain) Miguel Melgar
- (Spain) Álvaro Morata
- (Spain) Miguel Muñoz
- (Spain) Raúl Moreno
- (Spain) Rubén Pérez
- (Spain) Jaime Ramos
- (Spain) Óscar Rodríguez
- (Spain) Quini
- (Uruguay) Diego Rolán
- (Uruguay) Michael Santos
- (Venezuela) Darwin Machís

== List of coaches ==
- (Spain) Joseíto (1979–80)
- (Spain) Luis Ángel Duque (1989–95)
- (Spain) Luis Sánchez Duque (1995–97)
- (Spain) Pedro Braojos (1997–98)
- (Spain) Luis Sánchez Duque (1998–99)
- (Spain) Enrique Martín (1999–01)
- (Spain) Ciriaco Cano (2001)
- (Spain) Carlos Sánchez Aguiar (2001–02)
- (Spain) Enrique Martín (2002–03)
- (Argentina) Carlos Aimar (2003–04)
- (Argentina) Víctor Hugo Marchesini (2004)
- (Spain) Martín Delgado (2004)
- (Spain) Quique Estebaranz (2005)
- (Spain) Luis Ángel Duque (2005–06, 2009–10)
- (Spain) Santiago Martín Prado(2006–2007)
- (Spain) Miguel Rivera (2010–11)
- (Spain) Rafa Muñoz (2011)
- (Spain) Miguel Álvarez (2011)
- (Spain) Carlos Orúe (2011–12)
- (Spain) Víctor (2012)
- (Spain) Pablo Alfaro (2012–13)
- (Spain) Asier Garitano (2013–2018)
- (Argentina) Mauricio Pellegrino (2018–2019)
- (Mexico) Javier Aguirre (2019–2020)
- (Spain) José Luis Martí (2020–2021)
- (Spain) Asier Garitano (2021)
- (Tunisia) Mehdi Nafti (2021–2022)
- (Spain) Imanol Idiakez (2022-2023)
- (Spain) Borja Jiménez (2023-2025)
- (Spain) Paco López (2025)
- (Spain) Igor Oca (2025-2026)
- (Spain) Rubén Albés (2026-)
