= 2012–13 Segunda División =

82nd season of the second-tier football league in Spain

Segunda División
- Season: 2012–13
- Champions: Elche
- Promoted: Elche; Villarreal; Almeria
- Relegated: Guadalajara; Racing Santander; Huesca; Xerez
- Matches: 462
- Goals: 1,203 (2.6 per match)
- Top goalscorer: (Brazil) Charles
- Biggest home win: Girona 5–0 Las Palmas (16 September 2012); Real Madrid Castilla 5–0 Villarreal (19 January 2013); Córdoba 5–0 Murcia (20 January 2013); Villarreal 6–1 Numancia (7 April 2013); Real Madrid Castilla 6–1 Mirandés (21 April 2013)
- Biggest away win: Guadalajara 1–5 Girona (25 August 2012); Xerez 0–4 Mirandés (1 September 2012); Hércules 1–5 Xerez (4 November 2012); Mirandés 1–5 Villarreal (31 March 2013)
- Highest scoring: Barcelona B 4–5 Almería (17 August 2012)
- Highest attendance: 33,318; Elche 1–1 Barcelona B
- Lowest attendance: 977; Barcelona B 1–1 Las Palmas
- Average attendance: 6,774

The 2012–13 Segunda División season (known as the Liga Adelante for sponsorship reasons) was the 82nd since its establishment. The season started on 17 August 2012 and the league phase of 42 rounds ended on 9 June 2013. The entire season ended on 22 June 2013 with the promotion play-off finals.

== Teams ==
A total of 22 teams contested the league, including 15 sides from the 2011–12 season, four promoted from the 2011–12 Segunda División B and three relegated from 2011–12 La Liga.

Villarreal CF, Sporting de Gijón and Racing de Santander were the teams which were relegated from La Liga the previous season. Villarreal was relegated after 12 years in La Liga, Sporting de Gijón returned to the Segunda División after a four-year tenure in La Liga, while Racing de Santander ended ten consecutive seasons in La Liga, the longest period in its history. Deportivo de La Coruña was promoted the previous season and made their immediate return to the top level, Celta de Vigo after five years in the Segunda División, and the other team promoted to La Liga as play-off winner was Valladolid after two years of absence.

The teams relegated the previous season were Villarreal B, Gimnàstic de Tarragona, Alcoyano and Cartagena. These four were replaced by four Segunda División B teams: Real Madrid Castilla (group 1 champions and 2ªB champions), Mirandés (group 2 champions and 2ªB runners-up) and the winners of third round play-offs Ponferradina and Lugo. Ponferradina made an immediate return to the second level, while Real Madrid Castilla and Lugo returned to it respectively after 5 and 19 years. Finally, Mirandés made their debut in the second level.

Villarreal B did not finish in the relegation places, but Villarreal were relegated from Liga BBVA, and the rule of Spain is that two teams of the same owner cannot play in the same league, forcing Villarreal B's relegation.

=== Stadia and locations ===
Location of teams in Segunda División 2012–13
Canary Islands

Team	Home city	Stadium	Stadium capacity
Alcorcón	Alcorcón	Santo Domingo	5,400
Almería	Almería	Juegos Mediterráneos	22,000
Barcelona B	Barcelona	Mini Estadi	15,276
Córdoba	Córdoba	El Arcángel	18,280
Elche	Elche	Martínez Valero	36,017
Girona	Girona	Estadi Municipal Montilivi	9,282
Guadalajara	Guadalajara	Pedro Escartín	8,000
Hércules	Alicante	José Rico Pérez	30,000
Huesca	Huesca	El Alcoraz	5,300
Las Palmas	Las Palmas de Gran Canaria	Estadio Gran Canaria	31,250
Lugo	Lugo	Anxo Carro	4,800
Mirandés	Miranda de Ebro	Municipal de Anduva	6,000
Murcia	Murcia	Nueva Condomina	31,179
Numancia	Soria	Nuevo Los Pajaritos	9,025
Ponferradina	Ponferrada	El Toralín	8,800
Racing Santander	Santander	El Sardinero	22,222
Real Madrid Castilla	Madrid	Alfredo di Stéfano	12,000
Recreativo	Huelva	Nuevo Colombino	21,670
Sabadell	Sabadell	Nova Creu Alta	20,000
Sporting de Gijón	Gijón	El Molinón	30,000
Villarreal	Villarreal	El Madrigal	25,000
Xerez	Jerez de la Frontera	Municipal de Chapín	20,523

=== Personnel and sponsorship ===
Team	Chairman	Head coach	Captain	Kit manufacturer	Shirt sponsor
Alcorcón	(Spain) Julián Villena	(Spain) José Bordalás	(Spain) Rubén Sanz	Erreà	
Almería	(Spain) Alfonso García	(Spain) Xavi Gracia	(Spain) Corona	Nike	Urcisol.com
Barcelona B	(Spain) Sandro Rosell	(Spain) Eusebio Sacristán	(Spain) Ilie Sánchez	Nike	Qatar Foundation, Unicef
Córdoba	(Spain) Carlos González	(Argentina) Juan Eduardo Esnáider	(Spain) Gaspar Gálvez	Nike	
Elche	(Spain) José Sepulcre	(Spain) Fran Escribá	(Spain) Sergio Mantecón	Acerbis	Gioseppo
Girona	(Spain) Joaquim Boadas	(Spain) Rubi	(Spain) Dani Mallo	Luanvi	RDI
Guadalajara	(Spain) Germán Retuerta	(Spain) Carlos Terrazas	(Spain) Jorge Martín	Joma	Caja de Guadalajara
Hércules	(Spain) Jesús García Pitarch	(Spain) Quique Hernández	(Spain) Paco Peña	Nike	Comunitat Valenciana
Huesca	(Spain) Fernando Losfablos	(Argentina) Jorge D'Alessandro	(Spain) Joaquín Sorribas	Bemiser	Caja Inmaculada
Las Palmas	(Spain) Miguel Ángel Ramírez	(Spain) Sergio Lobera	(Spain) David García	Hummel	Gran Canaria
Lugo	(Spain) José Bouso	(Spain) Quique Setién	(Spain) Manu Rodríguez	Umbro	Estrella Galicia
Mirandés	(Spain) Ramiro Revuelta	(Spain) Carlos Pouso	(Spain) Iván Agustín	Bemiser	Province of Burgos
Murcia	(Spain) Jesús Samper	(Spain) Onésimo Sánchez	(Spain) Richi	Joma	
Numancia	(Spain) Francisco Rubio	(Spain) Pablo Machín	(Spain) Txomin Nagore	Erreà	Solarig
Ponferradina	(Spain) José Fernández Nieto	(Spain) Claudio Barragán	(Spain) Máyor	adidas	Bio3
Racing Santander	(Spain) Ángel Lavín	(Spain) Alejandro Menéndez	(Spain) Mario Fernández	Kelme	
Real Madrid Castilla	(Spain) Nicolás Martín-Sanz	(Spain) Alberto Toril	(Spain) Nacho	adidas	Bwin
Recreativo	(Spain) Pablo Comas-Mata	(Spain) Sergi Barjuán	(Spain) David Córcoles	Hummel	Cajasol
Sabadell	(Spain) Joan Soteras	(Spain) Lluís Carreras	(Spain) Agustín Fernández	Kelme	
Sporting de Gijón	(Spain) Manuel Vega-Arango	(Spain) José Ramón Sandoval	(Spain) Roberto Canella	Kappa	Gijón / Asturias, Ternera Asturiana
Villarreal	(Spain) Fernando Roig	(Spain) Marcelino García Toral	(Spain) Marcos Senna/Bruno Soriano	Xtep	
Xerez	(Spain) Rafael Mateos	(Spain) Carlos Ríos	(Spain) Jesús Mendoza	Cejudo	Cajasol

=== Managerial changes ===
Team	Outgoing manager	Manner of departure	Date of vacancy	Replaced by	Date of appointment	Position in table
Racing de Santander	(Spain) Álvaro Cervera	End of contract	12 May 2012	(Spain) Juan Carlos Unzué	19 June 2012	20th (in La Liga)
Villarreal	(Spain) Miguel Ángel Lotina	End of contract	16 May 2012	(Spain) Manuel Preciado	6 June 2012	
Sporting de Gijón	(Spain) Javier Clemente	End of contract	17 May 2012	(Spain) Manolo Sánchez	17 May 2012	19th (in La Liga)
Recreativo	(Spain) Juan Manuel Rodríguez	End of contract	30 June 2012	(Spain) Sergi Barjuán	29 May 2012	17th (2011–12)
Villarreal	(Spain) Manuel Preciado	Deceased	7 June 2012	(Spain) Julio Velázquez	14 June 2012	
Las Palmas	(Spain) Juan Manuel Rodríguez	End of contract	30 June 2012	(Spain) Sergio Lobera	17 June 2012	9th (2011–12)
Girona	(Spain) Javi Salamero	End of contract	30 June 2012	(Spain) Rubi	8 June 2012	15th (2011–12)
Almería	(Spain) Esteban Vigo	End of contract	30 June 2012	(Spain) Xavi Gracia	12 June 2012	7th (2011–12)
Elche	(Spain) César Ferrando	End of contract	30 June 2012	(Spain) Fran Escribá	12 June 2012	10th (2011–12)
Córdoba	(Spain) Paco Jémez	End of contract	30 June 2012	(Spain) Rafael Berges	13 June 2012	5th (2011–12)
Huesca	(Spain) Quique Hernández	End of contract	30 June 2012	(Spain) Fabri González	16 June 2012	13th (2011–12)
Murcia	(Spain) Iñaki Alonso	Mutual consent	30 June 2012	(Argentina) Gustavo Siviero	4 July 2012	18th (2011–12)
Alcorcón	(Spain) Juan Antonio Anquela	End of contract	30 June 2012	(Spain) José Bordalás	26 June 2012	4th (2011–12)
Xerez	(Spain) Vicente Moreno	End of contract	30 June 2012	(Spain) Esteban Vigo	4 July 2012	14th (2011–12)
Huesca	(Spain) Fabri González	Mutual consent	7 August 2012	(Spain) Antonio Calderón	8 August 2012	13th (2011–12)
Racing de Santander	(Spain) Juan Carlos Unzué	Sacked	13 August 2012	(Spain) Fabri González	14 August 2012	20th (in La Liga)
Sporting de Gijón	(Spain) Manolo Sánchez	Sacked	18 October 2012	(Spain) José Ramón Sandoval	18 October 2012	17th
Hércules	(Spain) Juan Carlos Mandiá	Sacked	22 October 2012	(Spain) Quique Hernández	22 October 2012	20th
Huesca	(Spain) Antonio Calderón	Sacked	10 December 2012	(Spain) Ángel Royo (as caretaker)	11 December 2012	19th
Racing de Santander	(Spain) Fabri González	Sacked	11 December 2012	(Spain) José Aurelio Gay	12 December 2012	20th
Huesca	(Spain) Ángel Royo	End of tenure as caretaker	25 December 2012	(Argentina) Jorge D'Alessandro	25 December 2012	20th
Villarreal	(Spain) Julio Velázquez	Sacked	13 January 2013	(Spain) Marcelino García Toral	14 January 2013	7th
Murcia	(Argentina) Gustavo Siviero	Sacked	4 February 2013	(Spain) Onésimo Sánchez	4 February 2013	17th
Xerez	(Spain) Esteban Vigo	Sacked	18 February 2013	(Spain) Carlos Ríos	20 February 2013	22nd
Racing de Santander	(Spain) José Aurelio Gay	Sacked	5 March 2013	(Spain) Alejandro Menéndez	5 March 2013	20th
Córdoba	(Spain) Rafael Berges	Sacked	8 April 2013	(Argentina) Juan Eduardo Esnáider	8 April 2013	9th

== League table ==
Pos	Team	Pld	W	D	L	GF	GA	GD	Pts	Promotion, qualification or relegation
1	Elche (C, P)	42	23	13	6	54	27	+27	82	Promotion to La Liga
2	Villarreal (P)	42	21	14	7	68	38	+30	77	Promotion to La Liga
3	Almería (P)	42	22	8	12	72	50	+22	74	Qualification to promotion play-offs
4	Girona	42	21	8	13	74	56	+18	71	Qualification to promotion play-offs
5	Alcorcón	42	21	6	15	57	55	+2	69	Qualification to promotion play-offs
6	Las Palmas	42	18	12	12	62	55	+7	66 (Note: LPA 1–0 PON; PON 0–1 LPA)	Qualification to promotion play-offs
7	Ponferradina	42	19	9	14	57	50	+7	66	
8	Real Madrid Castilla	42	17	8	17	80	62	+18	59	
9	Barcelona B	42	15	12	15	76	71	+5	57	
10	Sporting Gijón	42	15	11	16	60	53	+7	56 (Note: SPG 1–1 LUG; LUG 1–2 SPG)	
11	Lugo	42	15	11	16	46	54	−8	56	
12	Numancia	42	13	16	13	53	55	−2	55	
13	Recreativo	42	15	9	18	46	57	−11	54 (Note: CÓR 0–2 REC; REC 2–1 CÓR)	
14	Córdoba	42	15	9	18	55	55	0	54	
15	Mirandés	42	13	13	16	35	51	−16	52 (Note: SAB 1–1 MIR; MIR 2–0 SAB)	
16	Sabadell	42	14	10	18	54	69	−15	52	
17	Hércules	42	13	11	18	43	53	−10	50 (Note: HÉR 0–0 GUA; GUA 0–2 HÉR)	
18	Guadalajara (R)	42	12	14	16	46	53	−7	50	Relegation to Segunda División B (Note: Guadalajara were relegated to the Segunda División B by the LFP. Guadalajara had appealed the decision, but LFP confirmed the sanction. CEDD also confirmed the relegation.)
19	Murcia	42	12	11	19	43	56	−13	47	
20	Racing Santander (R)	42	12	10	20	38	51	−13	46	Relegation to Segunda División B
21	Huesca (R)	42	11	12	19	46	58	−12	45	Relegation to Segunda División B
22	Xerez (R)	42	7	9	26	38	74	−36	30	Relegation to Tercera División (Note: Xerez were relegated to the Tercera División on 1 August after enduring serious financial difficulties for several years.)

Source: LFP - Liga Adelante
Rules for classification: 1st points; 2nd head-to-head points; 3rd head-to-head goal difference; 4th head-to-head goals scored; 5th goal difference; 6th number of goals scored; 7th Fair-play points
(C) Champions; (P) Promoted; (R) Relegated

=== Positions by round ===
Team ╲ Round	1	2	3	4	5	6	7	8	9	10	11	12	13	14	15	16	17	18	19	20	21	22	23	24	25	26	27	28	29	30	31	32	33	34	35	36	37	38	39	40	41	42
Elche	1	1	1	1	1	1	1	1	1	1	1	1	1	1	1	1	1	1	1	1	1	1	1	1	1	1	1	1	1	1	1	1	1	1	1	1	1	1	1	1	1	1
Villarreal	5	10	5	2	2	2	2	3	3	6	5	5	5	4	5	5	5	5	5	6	7	10	8	8	7	6	7	5	5	5	5	4	3	4	4	4	4	3	2	2	2	2
Almería	4	2	2	3	3	3	4	2	2	2	2	2	3	3	2	2	2	3	4	4	3	2	2	2	2	2	2	2	2	3	4	3	2	5	5	5	5	4	3	3	3	3
Girona	11	3	3	4	4	6	5	4	4	5	4	3	2	2	3	4	3	2	2	3	2	3	3	3	4	4	3	4	4	4	3	5	4	2	2	3	2	2	4	4	4	4
Alcorcón	9	16	11	6	5	7	7	9	6	4	3	4	4	5	4	3	4	4	3	2	4	4	4	4	3	3	4	3	3	2	2	2	5	3	3	2	3	5	5	5	5	5
Las Palmas	6	8	10	16	18	19	18	19	20	19	17	15	12	12	8	8	7	9	7	8	6	6	7	7	8	7	9	8	7	6	6	6	6	6	6	6	6	6	6	7	6	6
Ponferradina	20	12	16	17	19	20	16	14	16	18	14	18	18	15	13	11	8	7	6	7	8	9	11	10	11	11	11	10	8	8	7	7	7	7	7	7	7	7	7	6	7	7
R.M.Castilla	16	12	15	11	12	11	13	11	7	9	10	12	13	13	15	15	14	15	16	17	16	16	16	14	13	14	13	15	15	15	15	15	15	14	10	11	10	12	10	10	8	8
Barcelona B	15	18	14	9	6	4	6	7	5	3	6	6	8	10	6	6	6	6	8	5	5	5	5	5	6	9	5	6	6	7	8	9	8	8	8	8	8	8	8	8	9	9
Sporting	21	21	19	20	21	18	20	17	17	16	12	14	16	18	17	16	17	16	14	15	15	14	14	15	14	15	15	13	13	12	10	10	12	9	9	10	12	10	9	9	10	10
Lugo	6	7	8	10	13	15	14	16	12	13	16	13	14	16	16	17	16	13	12	13	11	12	10	12	12	13	12	14	14	13	12	11	10	11	13	12	13	13	16	14	11	11
Numancia	3	4	6	8	11	10	9	8	10	12	15	17	15	14	12	10	13	14	13	9	12	13	13	13	15	12	14	12	12	11	13	12	13	13	14	14	15	15	14	13	14	12
Recreativo	22	14	12	7	10	8	10	10	11	8	7	7	6	7	9	13	12	11	10	10	13	11	12	11	9	8	10	11	11	14	14	13	14	15	15	13	14	14	17	12	13	13
Córdoba	14	5	7	13	17	12	15	12	14	11	11	7	7	9	11	12	11	10	11	12	10	8	6	6	5	5	8	9	10	9	9	8	9	10	11	9	9	9	11	11	12	14
Mirandés	18	20	13	15	15	17	19	20	21	21	21	20	20	20	20	20	22	19	19	20	20	19	18	16	17	19	19	18	18	18	18	18	19	17	18	18	18	18	18	18	18	15
Sabadell	12	15	18	12	8	5	3	6	9	10	9	11	9	6	7	7	9	8	9	11	9	7	9	9	10	10	6	7	9	10	11	14	11	12	12	15	11	11	12	15	15	16
Hércules	19	19	22	18	20	21	21	21	19	20	20	21	22	21	22	22	21	22	22	22	22	21	21	20	20	20	21	21	21	21	20	19	20	19	17	17	17	16	13	16	16	17
Guadalajara	10	17	21	22	22	22	22	22	22	22	22	22	21	22	21	21	18	18	18	18	17	17	17	18	16	16	17	17	16	16	16	16	16	16	16	16	16	17	15	17	17	18
Murcia	12	6	4	5	9	14	8	5	8	7	8	9	10	8	10	9	10	12	15	14	14	15	15	17	18	17	16	16	17	17	17	17	18	18	19	19	19	19	19	20	20	19
Racing	17	22	20	21	16	13	12	15	15	14	18	16	17	19	19	19	20	21	21	19	21	22	22	22	21	21	20	20	19	19	21	20	17	21	20	21	21	20	20	19	21	20
Huesca	8	9	9	14	7	9	11	13	13	15	19	19	19	17	18	18	19	20	20	21	19	20	19	19	19	18	18	19	20	20	19	21	21	20	21	20	20	21	21	21	19	21
Xerez	2	11	17	19	14	16	17	18	18	17	13	10	11	11	14	14	15	17	17	16	18	18	20	21	22	22	22	22	22	22	22	22	22	22	22	22	22	22	22	22	22	22

Leader
2013–14 La Liga
2013 Promotion Play-off
Relegation to 2013–14 Segunda División B

Source: LFP Liga Adelante

== Results ==
Home \ Away	ADA	ALM	BAR	CÓR	ELC	GIR	GUA	HÉR	HUE	LPA	LUG	MIR	MUR	NUM	PNF	RAC	RMC	REC	SAB	RSG	VIL	XER
Alcorcón	—	0–3	1–1	2–1	1–0	4–1	1–1	1–0	1–0	3–1	2–1	4–0	1–0	1–1	1–0	0–1	3–2	2–1	4–0	0–1	1–3	2–1
Almería	0–1	—	2–2	3–0	2–1	2–1	4–0	0–0	1–0	2–3	0–1	0–0	3–2	1–1	4–1	2–1	1–0	2–1	5–1	0–1	1–1	2–1
Barcelona B	1–1	4–5	—	4–3	1–1	4–4	0–1	1–0	0–1	1–1	2–2	1–1	1–1	3–3	2–1	4–1	3–1	2–3	2–0	3–0	0–3	4–2
Córdoba	1–1	4–1	2–1	—	0–1	2–0	1–0	1–2	2–2	5–1	1–0	1–2	5–0	1–0	0–1	2–0	1–0	0–2	3–0	1–1	0–2	0–0
Elche	1–0	1–0	1–1	0–0	—	0–0	3–1	2–0	3–1	3–1	0–0	0–1	1–0	4–0	4–2	1–0	1–1	3–0	3–2	2–1	1–0	2–1
Girona	3–2	0–1	1–0	2–0	0–1	—	2–0	1–1	2–1	5–0	4–0	4–0	5–2	3–1	1–0	1–0	1–1	5–2	0–0	3–1	2–0	2–4
Guadalajara	3–0	2–2	0–1	3–1	0–0	1–5	—	0–2	1–0	2–3	0–1	1–1	3–1	5–1	2–0	1–1	3–4	1–0	1–1	2–1	0–0	1–1
Hércules	3–0	0–2	0–3	1–0	1–2	2–1	0–0	—	2–1	0–2	3–0	1–0	0–2	1–3	1–1	2–0	2–4	1–1	3–1	1–1	1–1	1–5
Huesca	0–1	1–2	1–4	1–3	0–0	0–0	2–1	1–1	—	0–0	3–0	0–1	2–0	1–1	1–1	1–1	2–2	3–1	4–3	2–1	0–1	3–1
Las Palmas	1–3	1–2	3–3	3–0	0–0	5–2	0–1	0–0	4–0	—	1–1	2–0	3–2	2–1	1–0	1–0	2–0	0–0	1–0	4–2	2–2	1–1
Lugo	0–1	3–5	1–2	1–1	1–0	1–2	0–0	1–0	2–4	3–1	—	2–0	2–1	0–0	2–2	3–2	3–2	2–0	2–0	1–2	0–0	4–0
Mirandés	0–2	1–0	3–0	0–0	1–2	1–1	0–0	3–2	0–1	1–0	1–0	—	0–1	0–0	0–0	0–1	0–0	2–1	2–0	2–1	1–5	1–0
Murcia	1–1	1–0	1–0	0–0	1–0	0–1	0–1	2–1	2–1	1–0	0–1	2–2	—	0–0	0–2	1–0	0–0	1–2	1–1	1–1	1–1	3–1
Numancia	0–1	0–0	0–1	1–0	3–1	2–1	2–2	3–2	1–2	3–0	3–0	0–0	1–0	—	0–1	2–0	3–3	0–0	2–1	2–0	1–1	3–0
Ponferradina	2–0	2–2	3–2	3–5	1–1	2–0	2–2	1–0	2–1	0–1	0–1	3–1	1–0	1–1	—	2–2	2–0	1–0	3–1	1–0	0–1	0–1
Racing Santander	2–1	3–4	1–2	1–3	0–0	0–1	0–0	3–0	1–0	0–1	0–0	2–0	2–1	1–1	2–1	—	1–0	3–0	0–1	0–0	0–3	1–1
Real Madrid Castilla	4–0	2–1	3–2	4–0	0–1	0–0	2–1	1–1	5–1	3–2	3–1	6–1	2–0	2–4	1–2	4–0	—	0–1	2–3	2–4	5–0	3–2
Recreativo	4–2	0–2	2–0	2–1	1–2	1–3	1–0	0–2	0–0	0–0	3–0	1–0	3–2	2–0	0–2	1–0	1–3	—	2–5	1–1	2–0	2–0
Sabadell	2–0	3–0	3–2	1–1	0–0	4–1	2–1	1–2	1–0	0–4	0–1	1–1	2–2	2–1	0–3	0–2	3–1	1–1	—	4–3	0–0	3–0
Sporting Gijón	2–1	2–1	5–2	3–0	0–2	4–0	3–0	0–1	1–0	1–1	1–1	1–1	2–3	1–1	2–3	1–2	1–0	0–0	0–0	—	2–0	3–0
Villarreal	4–0	1–0	1–3	2–0	2–3	4–1	2–1	1–0	1–1	1–1	1–1	2–0	1–1	6–1	3–0	1–0	2–1	1–1	3–0	2–1	—	3–2
Xerez	2–4	0–2	2–1	1–3	0–0	0–2	0–1	0–0	1–1	1–2	1–0	0–4	0–3	2–0	1–2	1–1	0–1	2–0	0–1	0–2	0–0	—

Source: BDFutbol
Legend: Blue = home team win; Yellow = draw; Red = away team win.

== Promotion play-offs ==
This promotion phase (known as Promoción de ascenso) was to determine the third team which was promoted to 2013–14 La Liga. Teams placed between 3rd and 6th position (excluding reserve teams) took part in the promotion play-offs. Fifth placed faced against the fourth, while the sixth positioned team faced against the third. The first leg of the semi-finals was played on 12 June, the best positioned team was played at home the second leg on 16 June. The final was also two-legged, with the first leg on 19 June and the second leg on 23 June, with the best positioned team also playing at home the second leg. Girona and Almería played the final phase, where Almería was winner and promoted to La Liga after a two-year absence. Alcorcón and Las Palmas were eliminated in semi-finals.

=== Play-Offs ===
Semi-finals
5	Alcorcón	1	1	2
4	Girona	1	3	4
6	Las Palmas	1	1	2
3	Almería (aet)	1	2	3

Final
4	Girona	0	0	0
3	Almería	1	3	4

==== Semifinals ====
===== First leg =====
12 June 2013	Alcorcón	1 – 1	Girona	Alcorcón
20:00 CEST	Miguélez 63'	Report	Hurtado 10'	Stadium: Santo Domingo; Attendance: 5,000; Referee: José María Sánchez Martínez

12 June 2013	Las Palmas	1 – 1	Almería	Las Palmas de Gran Canaria
21:00 WEST	Bifouma 85'	Report	Vidal 6'	Stadium: Gran Canaria; Attendance: 16,564; Referee: Eduardo Prieto Iglesias

===== Second leg =====
16 June 2013	Almería	2 – 1 (a.e.t.) (3 – 2 agg.)	Las Palmas	Almería
19:00 CEST	Soriano 60'; Charles 120+1'	Report	Chrisantus 86'	Stadium: Juegos Mediterráneos; Attendance: 11,065; Referee: Fernando López Acera

16 June 2013	Girona	3 – 1 (4 – 2 agg.)	Alcorcón	Girona
21:00 CEST	Acuña 15'; Juanlu 37', 80'	Report	Mora 86'	Stadium: Montilivi; Attendance: 9,286; Referee: Juan Martínez Munuera

==== Final ====
19 June 2013 First leg	Girona	0 – 1	Almería	Girona
20:00 CEST		Report	Charles 51'	Stadium: Montilivi; Attendance: 9,286; Referee: Francisco Manuel Arias López

22 June 2013 Second leg	Almería	3 – 0 (4 – 0 agg.)	Girona	Almería
20:00 CEST	Vidal 18'; Charles 53', 71'	Report		Stadium: Juegos Mediterráneos; Attendance: 15,123; Referee: Santiago Jaime Latre

== Awards and season statistics ==
=== Top scorers ===
Rank	Player	Club	Goals
1	(Brazil) Charles	Almería	27
2	(Spain) Jesé	Real Madrid Castilla	22
3	(Brazil) Yuri	Ponferradina	21
4	(Spain) Gerard Deulofeu	Barcelona B	18
4	(Spain) Oriol Riera	Alcorcón	18
6	(Spain) Javier Portillo	Hércules	17
7	(Paraguay) Javier Acuña	Girona	16
8	(Spain) Chuli	Recreativo	15
8	(Spain) Óscar Díaz	Lugo	15
8	(Spain) Vitolo	Las Palmas	15

=== Zamora Trophy ===
The Zamora Trophy is awarded by newspaper Marca
to the goalkeeper with least goals-to-games ratio.

Rank	Name	Club	Goals	Matches	Average
1	(Spain) Manu	Elche	25	39	0.64
2	(Spain) Juan Carlos	Villarreal	30	32	0.94
3	(Spain) Roberto Santamaría	Ponferradina	33	31	1.06
4	(Spain) Yoel	Lugo	36	33	1.09
5	(Spain) Ismael Falcón	Hércules	43	37	1.16
6	(Spain) Esteban	Almería	50	42	1.19
7	(Spain) Iago Herrerín	Numancia	41	34	1.21
8	(Spain) Iñaki Goitia	Mirandés	50	41	1.22
9	(Spain) Dani Mallo	Girona	49	39	1.26
10	(Spain) Alberto	Córdoba	52	40	1.3

=== Fair Play award ===
This award is given annually since 1999 to the team with the best fair play during the season. This ranking takes into account aspects such as cards, suspension of matches, audience behaviour and other penalties. This section not only aims to know this aspect, but also serves to break the tie in teams that are tied in all the other rules: points, head-to-head, goal difference and goals scored.

Rank	Team	Games	Points
1	Barcelona B	42	99
2	Girona	42	113
3	Guadalajara	42	119
4	Lugo	42	121
5	Mirandés	42	124
6	Real Madrid Castilla	42	127
7	Racing Santander	42	130
8	Elche	42	131
9	Córdoba	42	135
9	Ponferradina	42	135
11	Almería	42	140
12	Numancia	42	147
13	Hércules	42	156
14	Villarreal	42	159
15	Sabadell	42	160
16	Huesca	42	163
17	Las Palmas	42	166
18	Recreativo	42	171
19	Sporting Gijón	42	185
20	Alcorcón	42	189
21	Murcia	42	194
22	Xerez	42	196

Source: 2012–13 Fair Play Rankings Season

=== Scoring ===
- First goal of the season: Jean Marie Dongou for Barcelona B against Almería (17 August 2012)
- Fastest goal in a match: 17 seconds – Máyor for SD Ponferradina against Sabadell (17 March 2013)
- Goal scored at the latest point in a match: 90+5 minutes
  - Ernesto Galán (own goal) for Sabadell against Xerez (24 February 2013)
  - Manu Trigueros for Villarreal against Real Murcia (14 April 2013)
- Widest winning margin: 5
  - Girona 5–0 Las Palmas (16 September 2012)
  - Real Madrid Castilla 5–0 Villarreal (19 January 2013)
  - Córdoba 5–0 Real Murcia (20 January 2013)
  - Villarreal 6–1 Numancia (7 April 2013)
  - Real Madrid Castilla 6–1 Mirandés (21 April 2013)
- Most goals in a match: 9 – Barcelona 4–5 Almería (17 August 2012)
- First hat-trick of the season: Gerard Deulofeu for Barcelona against Almería (17 August 2012)
- Most goals by one player in a single match: 3
  - Gerard Deulofeu for Barcelona against Almería (17 August 2012)
  - Aníbal Zurdo for Sabadell against Almería (8 September 2012)
  - Oriol Riera for Alcorcón against Las Palmas (8 September 2012)
  - Chuli for Recreativo against Alcorcón (6 October 2012)
  - Vitolo for Las Palmas against Córdoba (24 November 2012)
  - Charles for Almería against Racing Santander (2 December 2012)
  - Airam for Lugo against Xerez (30 March 2013)
- Most goals by one team in a match: 6
  - Villarreal 6–1 Numancia (7 April 2013)
  - Real Madrid Castilla 6–1 Mirandés (21 April 2013)
- First own goal of the season: Tomás Mejías for Barcelona B against Real Madrid Castilla (25 August 2012)
- Most goals in one half by one team: 5 – Real Madrid Castilla 6–1 Mirandés (21 April 2013)
- Most goals scored by losing team: 4 – Barcelona B 4–5 Almería (17 August 2012)

=== Discipline ===
- First yellow card: Charles for Almería against Barcelona B (17 August 2012)
- First red card: Carles Planas for Barcelona B against Almería (17 August 2012)

== Attendances ==
Pos	Team	Total	High	Low	Average	Change
1	Sporting Gijón	333,483	19,951	8,187	15,880	n/a
2	Elche	297,125	33,318	6,793	14,856	n/a
3	Las Palmas	253,356	23,985	8,102	12,065	n/a
4	Villarreal	225,000	25,000	5,000	10,714	n/a
5	Córdoba	200,790	18,375	5,314	9,561	n/a
6	Racing Santander	189,607	14,995	5,671	9,029	n/a
7	Almería	162,016	12,927	4,034	7,715	n/a
8	Hércules	151,905	11,000	5,000	7,234	n/a
9	Murcia	144,519	13,882	5,000	7,226	n/a
10	Ponferradina	132,000	8,500	5,000	6,286	n/a
11	Girona	124,013	9,286	1,487	5,905	n/a
12	Barcelona B	107,456	13,826	977	5,117	n/a
13	Recreativo	103,456	6,407	3,813	4,931	n/a
15	Mirandés	98,353	5,500	2,721	4,683	n/a
14	Xerez	96,001	6,474	2,077	4,571	n/a
16	Lugo	79,100	6,000	2,500	3,955	n/a
17	Huesca	74,313	5,734	2,589	3,539	n/a
18	Sabadell	73,410	6,420	1,630	3,496	n/a
19	Alcorcón	70,742	4,800	2,000	3,369	n/a
20	Guadalajara	67,100	5,000	2,000	3,195	n/a
21	Numancia	62,673	3,853	2,033	2,984	n/a
22	Real Madrid Castilla	60,116	6,000	1,634	2,863	n/a
	League total	3,116,103	33,318	977	6,774	n/a

Updated to games played on 9 June 2013
Source: Official websites and other Spanish media

== Teams by autonomous community ==
	Autonomous community	Number of teams	Teams
1	Andalusia	4	Almería, Córdoba, Recreativo and Xerez
2	Castile and León	3	Mirandés, Numancia and Ponferradina
2	Catalonia	3	Barcelona B, Girona and Sabadell
2	Valencian Community	3	Elche, Hércules and Villarreal
5	Community of Madrid	2	Alcorcón and Real Madrid Castilla
6	(Aragon) Aragón	1	Huesca
6	Asturias	1	Sporting Gijón
6	Canary Islands	1	Las Palmas
6	Cantabria	1	Racing Santander
6	(Castilla–La Mancha) Castile-La Mancha	1	Guadalajara
6	(Galicia (Spain)) Galicia	1	Lugo
6	Region of Murcia	1	Murcia

== See also ==
- List of Spanish football transfers summer 2012
- List of Spanish football transfers winter 2012–13
- 2012–13 La Liga
- 2013 Segunda División play-offs
- 2012–13 Segunda División B
- 2012–13 Copa del Rey
