= 2011–12 Segunda División =

81st season of the second-tier football league in Spain

Segunda División
- Season: 2011–12
- Champions: Deportivo La Coruña
- Promoted: Deportivo La Coruña; Celta; Valladolid
- Relegated: Villarreal B Alcoyano; Cartagena; Gimnàstic de Tarragona
- Matches: 462
- Goals: 1,218 (2.64 per match)
- Top goalscorer: (Argentina) Leonardo Ulloa
- Biggest home win: Elche 6–0 Alcorcón (16 December 2011)
- Biggest away win: Xerez 0–6 Barcelona B (3 June 2012)
- Highest scoring: Girona 5–3 Xerez (10 March 2012); Murcia 2–6 Hércules (14 April 2012); Cartagena 6–2 Villarreal B (27 May 2012)

The 2011–12 Segunda División season (known as the Liga Adelante for sponsorship reasons) was the 81st since its establishment. The first matches of the season were played on 26 August 2011 after the Association of Spanish Footballers (AFE) called a strike, the regular league ended on 3 June 2012, while the entire season ended on 16 June 2012 with the promotion play-off finals.

The first goal of the season was scored by Xabier Etxeita, who scored a ninth-minute goal for Elche against Girona in the early kick-off. The first red card of the season was given to Richy from Girona in their opening game against Elche. The first hat-trick was scored by Joselu in the match between Villarreal B and Gimnàstic de Tarragona.

== Teams ==
Deportivo La Coruña, Hércules and Almería are the teams which were relegated from La Liga the previous season. Deportivo were relegated after 20 years in La Liga, Hércules made their immediate return to the second level after just one season in the top division, while Almería ended a four-year tenure in La Liga. Betis were promoted after two consecutive seasons in the second level, Rayo Vallecano after eight years in lower divisions and Granada after playing in lower divisions for 35 years.

The teams which were relegated the previous season were Salamanca, Tenerife, Ponferradina and Albacete. These four were replaced by Real Murcia (group 4 champions and 2ªB champions), Sabadell (group 3 champions and 2ªB runners-up), Alcoyano and Guadalajara.

=== Stadia and locations ===
Location of teams in Segunda División 2011–12
Canary Islands

Team	Home city	Stadium	Stadium capacity
Alcorcón	Alcorcón	Santo Domingo	5,400
Alcoyano	Alcoy	El Collao	4,500
Almería	Almería	Estadio del Mediterráneo	22,000
Barcelona B	Barcelona	Mini Estadi	15,276
Cartagena	Cartagena	Cartagonova	14,500
Celta de Vigo	Vigo	Balaídos	31,800
Córdoba	Córdoba	Nuevo Arcángel	18,280
Deportivo La Coruña	A Coruña	Riazor	34,600
Elche	Elche	Martínez Valero	36,017
Gimnàstic	Tarragona	Nou Estadi	14,500
Girona	Girona	Montilivi	9,500
Guadalajara	Guadalajara	Pedro Escartín	8,000
Hércules	Alicante	Estadio José Rico Pérez	30,000
Huesca	Huesca	El Alcoraz	5,300
Las Palmas	Las Palmas de Gran Canaria	Gran Canaria	31,250
Murcia	Murcia	Nueva Condomina	31,179
Numancia	Soria	Los Pajaritos	9,025
Recreativo	Huelva	Nuevo Colombino	21,670
Sabadell	Sabadell	Nova Creu Alta	20,000
Valladolid	Valladolid	José Zorrilla	26,512
Villarreal B	Vila-real	Ciudad Deportiva	5,000
Xerez	Jerez de la Frontera	Chapín	20,523

=== Personnel and sponsorship ===
Team	Chairman	Head coach	Kit manufacturer	Shirt sponsor
Alcorcón	(Spain) Julián Villena	(Spain) Juan Antonio Anquela	Erreà	
Alcoyano	(Spain) Juan Serrano Morillas	(Spain) Luis César Sampedro	Rasán	Unión Alcoyana Seguros, Grupo Realsa
Almería	(Spain) Alfonso García Gabarrón	(Spain) Esteban Vigo	Rasán	Urcisol.com
Barcelona B	(Spain) Sandro Rosell	(Spain) Eusebio Sacristán	Nike	Qatar Foundation and UNICEF^{1}
Cartagena	(Spain) Francisco Gómez	(Spain) Carlos Ríos	Kelme	Bodegas Francisco Gómez
Celta de Vigo	(Spain) Carlos Mouriño	(Spain) Paco Herrera	Li-Ning	Citroën, Estrella Galicia, Monbus
Córdoba	(Spain) Carlos González	(Spain) Paco Jémez	Printing Dimension	CCF^{2}
Deportivo La Coruña	(Spain) Augusto Lendoiro	(Spain) José Luis Oltra	Lotto	Estrella Galicia, Leyma Natura
Elche	(Spain) José Sepulcre	(Spain) César Ferrando	Acerbis	Comunitat Valenciana
Gimnàstic	(Spain) Antonio Vallverdú	(Argentina) Jorge D'Alessandro	N^{2}	Tarragona 2017
Girona	(Spain) Joaquim Boadas	(Spain) Javi Salamero	Nike	Grup Disbesa Darnés
Guadalajara	(Spain) Germán Retuerta Sánchez	(Spain) Carlos Terrazas	Joma	Caja Guadalajara, Piscinas Polifibra
Hércules	(Spain) Valentín Botella Ros	(Spain) Juan Carlos Mandiá	Nike	Comunitat Valenciana
Huesca	(Spain) Fernando Losfablos	(Spain) Quique Hernández	Bemiser	CAI
Las Palmas	(Spain) Miguel Ángel Ramírez	(Spain) Juan Manuel Rodríguez	KS	La Caja de Canarias
Murcia	(Spain) Miguel Álvarez Benítez	(Spain) Iñaki Alonso	Joma	No-typical
Numancia	(Spain) Francisco Rubio	(Spain) Pablo Machín	Erreà	Caja Rural
Recreativo	(Spain) Susana Duque	(Spain) Juan Manuel Rodríguez	Cejudo	Cajasol
Sabadell	(Spain) Joan Soteras	(Spain) Lluís Carreras	Kelme	Maderas Rojas, Estrella Damm
Valladolid	(Spain) Carlos Suárez	(Serbia) Miroslav Đukić	Kappa	
Villarreal B	(Spain) Fernando Roig	(Spain) Julio Velázquez	Xtep	
Xerez	(Spain) Jesús Gómez	(Spain) Vicente Moreno	Cejudo	Cajasol

1. Barcelona B makes a donation to UNICEF in order to display the charity's logo on the club's kit.
2. Club's own brand.

=== Managerial changes ===
Team	Outgoing manager	Manner of departure	Date of vacancy	Replaced by	Date of appointment	Position in table
Deportivo La Coruña	(Spain) Miguel Ángel Lotina	End of contract	23 May 2011	(Spain) José Luis Oltra	27 May 2011	18th (in La Liga)
Almería	(Spain) Roberto Olabe	Sacked	24 May 2011	(Spain) Lucas Alcaraz	25 June 2011	20th (in La Liga)
Hércules	(Serbia) Miroslav Đukić	End of contract	26 May 2011	(Spain) Juan Carlos Mandiá	22 June 2011	19th (in La Liga)
Cartagena	(Spain) Juan Ignacio Martínez	End of contract	28 May 2011	(Spain) Paco López	28 May 2011	13th (2010–11)
Numancia	(Spain) Juan Carlos Unzué	End of contract	31 May 2011	(Spain) Pablo Machín	31 May 2011	10th (2010–11)
Córdoba	(Spain) Lucas Alcaraz	End of contract	2 June 2011	(Spain) Paco Jémez	8 June 2011	16th (2010–11)
Huesca	(Spain) Onésimo Sánchez	End of contract	2 June 2011	(Spain) Ángel Royo	8 June 2011	14th (2010–11)
Barcelona B	(Spain) Luis Enrique	Resigned	3 June 2011	(Spain) Eusebio Sacristán	28 June 2011	3rd (2010–11)
Xerez	(Spain) Javi López	End of contract	4 June 2011	(Spain) Juan Merino	14 June 2011	8th (2010–11)
Valladolid	(Spain) Abel Resino	End of contract	17 June 2011	(Serbia) Miroslav Đukić	6 July 2011	7th (2010–11)
Recreativo	(Spain) Carlos Ríos	Mutual consent	22 June 2011	(Spain) Álvaro Cervera	24 June 2011	12th (2010–11)
Cartagena	(Spain) Paco López	Sacked	19 September 2011	(Spain) Javi López	20 September 2011	22nd
Huesca	(Spain) Ángel Royo	Sacked	3 October 2011	(Spain) Quique Hernández	3 October 2011	20th
Gimnàstic	(Spain) Juan Carlos Oliva	Sacked	30 October 2011	(Argentina) Jorge D'Alessandro	31 October 2011	22nd
Xerez	(Spain) Juan Merino	Sacked	4 December 2011	(Spain) Vicente Moreno	4 December 2011	16th
Villarreal B	(Spain) José Francisco Molina	Mutual consent	22 December 2011	(Spain) Julio Velázquez	22 December 2011	18th
Cartagena	(Spain) Javi López	Sacked	23 December 2011	(Spain) Carlos Ríos	23 December 2011	22nd
Girona	(Spain) Raül Agné	Sacked	15 January 2012	(Spain) Josu Uribe	15 January 2012	21st
Recreativo	(Spain) Álvaro Cervera	Mutual consent	9 March 2012	(Spain) Juan Manuel Rodríguez	9 March 2012	11th
Alcoyano	(Spain) David Porras	Sacked	18 March 2012	(Spain) Luis César Sampedro	21 March 2012	19th
Girona	(Spain) Josu Uribe	Sacked	25 March 2012	(Spain) Javi Salamero	25 March 2012	21st
Almería	(Spain) Lucas Alcaraz	Sacked	4 April 2012	(Spain) Esteban Vigo	4 April 2012	5th
Elche	(Spain) José Bordalás	Sacked	8 April 2012	(Spain) César Ferrando	11 April 2012	8th

== League table ==
Pos	Team	Pld	W	D	L	GF	GA	GD	Pts	Promotion, qualification or relegation
1	Deportivo La Coruña (C, P)	42	29	4	9	76	45	+31	91	Promotion to La Liga
2	Celta de Vigo (P)	42	26	7	9	83	37	+46	85	Promotion to La Liga
3	Valladolid (P)	42	23	13	6	69	37	+32	82	Qualification to promotion play-offs
4	Alcorcón	42	21	10	11	58	42	+16	73	Qualification to promotion play-offs
5	Hércules	42	22	6	14	62	43	+19	72	Qualification to promotion play-offs
6	Córdoba	42	20	11	11	52	43	+9	71	Qualification to promotion play-offs
7	Almería	42	18	16	8	63	43	+20	70	
8	Barcelona B	42	16	11	15	63	53	+10	59	
9	Las Palmas	42	16	10	16	58	59	−1	58	
10	Numancia	42	15	12	15	54	52	+2	57 (Note: ELC 2–2 NUM; NUM 3–0 ELC)	
11	Elche	42	17	6	19	56	58	−2	57	
12	Villarreal B (R)	42	14	10	18	54	64	−10	52	Relegation to Segunda División B (Note: Since first team Villarreal was relegated to the Segunda División, reserve team Villarreal B was automatically relegated to Segunda División B, whilst Sabadell was re-instated.)
13	Huesca	42	14	9	19	49	63	−14	51	
14	Xerez	42	13	11	18	50	66	−16	50	
15	Girona	42	12	13	17	58	61	−3	49 (Note: GIR 0–0 GUA; GUA 1–4 GIR)	
16	Guadalajara	42	14	7	21	50	75	−25	49	
17	Recreativo	42	12	11	19	49	52	−3	47 (Note: REC 0–2 MUR; MUR 0–3 REC)	
18	Murcia	42	13	8	21	49	67	−18	47	
19	Sabadell	42	11	13	18	45	64	−19	46	
20	Cartagena (R)	42	9	13	20	37	58	−21	40	Relegation to Segunda División B
21	Alcoyano (R)	42	9	10	23	46	78	−32	37	Relegation to Segunda División B
22	Gimnàstic (R)	42	6	13	23	37	58	−21	31	Relegation to Segunda División B

Source: LFP - Liga Adelante
Rules for classification: 1st points; 2nd head-to-head points; 3rd head-to-head goal difference; 4th head-to-head goals scored; 5th goal difference; 6th number of goals scored; 7th Fair-play points
(C) Champions; (P) Promoted; (R) Relegated

=== Positions by round ===
Team ╲ Round	1	2	3	4	5	6	7	8	9	10	11	12	13	14	15	16	17	18	19	20	21	22	23	24	25	26	27	28	29	30	31	32	33	34	35	36	37	38	39	40	41	42
Deportivo	7	11	8	4	8	5	6	7	6	9	7	7	5	7	5	6	3	2	2	1	1	1	1	1	1	1	1	1	1	1	1	1	1	1	1	1	1	1	1	1	1	1
Celta Vigo	3	3	6	12	10	9	12	12	9	6	4	3	3	6	7	7	7	6	5	3	5	3	3	2	2	2	2	2	2	2	2	2	3	3	3	3	2	2	2	2	2	2
Valladolid	2	1	3	8	9	6	5	6	4	3	5	4	4	2	2	3	4	4	4	4	2	2	2	3	3	4	3	3	3	3	3	3	2	2	2	2	3	3	3	3	3	3
Alcorcón	16	9	11	7	3	8	7	10	8	11	10	11	12	14	12	8	9	11	10	11	11	9	10	8	8	8	8	8	8	8	7	5	5	5	5	5	5	4	4	4	4	4
Hércules	4	4	7	2	4	2	1	1	1	1	1	1	1	1	1	1	1	3	3	5	3	5	5	6	6	5	5	6	4	5	6	4	4	4	4	4	4	5	5	5	6	5
Córdoba	10	16	13	10	6	4	4	4	7	5	9	10	7	4	6	4	5	7	6	7	7	6	7	7	7	6	6	5	6	6	4	6	6	7	7	7	6	6	6	6	5	6
Almería	12	13	10	6	2	1	3	3	5	4	2	2	2	3	4	5	6	5	7	6	6	4	4	4	4	3	4	4	5	4	5	7	7	6	6	6	7	7	7	7	7	7
Barcelona B	19	8	14	16	18	19	19	20	17	15	13	14	14	12	10	13	12	14	12	14	12	10	11	9	10	13	13	12	11	11	11	10	10	8	8	9	9	9	10	11	9	8
Las Palmas	11	7	4	9	11	13	8	8	11	8	6	8	11	11	14	9	10	12	13	10	10	14	12	13	11	14	10	10	10	9	10	11	11	11	11	10	10	11	11	8	10	9
Numancia	12	14	16	15	16	18	18	16	16	14	14	13	10	10	13	14	14	10	9	9	9	11	8	10	9	9	9	9	9	10	9	8	9	10	10	11	11	10	8	9	8	10
Elche	1	2	1	1	7	12	13	13	10	12	11	6	8	5	3	2	2	1	1	2	4	7	6	5	5	7	7	7	7	7	8	9	8	9	9	8	8	8	9	10	11	11
Villarreal B	5	10	12	14	14	11	11	11	14	16	16	17	16	18	18	18	17	18	18	18	19	18	17	18	18	17	17	16	16	15	16	14	14	15	13	15	13	12	12	12	12	12
Huesca	15	21	20	21	19	20	20	19	20	21	21	22	22	22	21	19	19	19	19	19	20	20	20	20	20	19	18	19	18	18	17	17	17	16	15	12	14	17	14	13	13	13
Xerez	8	12	9	11	13	10	10	9	13	13	15	15	17	17	15	16	18	16	16	16	16	16	16	16	15	15	15	15	14	14	14	16	15	13	12	13	15	13	13	14	14	14
Girona	21	17	17	19	17	17	17	18	19	20	20	19	19	19	20	20	21	20	20	21	21	21	21	21	21	21	21	21	21	21	20	20	20	20	20	19	19	19	19	19	17	15
Guadalajara	14	6	5	5	1	7	9	5	3	7	13	12	13	13	11	11	8	9	11	13	14	13	15	15	16	16	16	17	17	17	18	18	18	18	18	18	18	18	18	18	18	16
Recreativo	16	19	15	13	12	14	16	17	18	18	18	16	15	15	17	15	15	15	15	12	13	12	13	14	13	11	11	11	12	13	13	13	13	12	14	14	12	16	17	16	15	17
Murcia	18	20	21	17	15	15	15	15	12	10	8	9	6	8	8	10	13	8	8	8	8	8	9	11	12	10	12	13	15	16	12	15	16	17	17	16	16	15	15	15	16	18
Sabadell	6	5	2	3	5	3	2	2	2	2	3	5	9	9	9	12	11	13	14	15	15	15	14	12	14	12	14	14	13	12	15	12	12	14	16	17	17	14	16	17	19	19
Cartagena	19	22	22	22	22	22	22	22	21	19	19	20	21	21	22	22	22	22	21	20	18	19	19	19	19	20	20	20	20	20	22	21	21	21	22	21	21	21	21	21	21	20
Alcoyano	9	15	18	18	20	16	14	14	15	17	17	18	18	16	16	17	16	17	17	17	17	17	18	17	17	18	19	18	19	19	19	19	19	19	19	20	20	20	20	20	20	21
Gimnàstic	22	18	19	20	21	21	21	21	22	22	22	21	20	20	19	21	20	21	22	22	22	22	22	22	22	22	22	22	22	22	21	22	22	22	21	22	22	22	22	22	22	22

Leader
2012–13 La Liga
2012 Promotion Play-off
Relegation to 2012–13 Segunda División B

Source: LFP Liga Adelante
Note: Due to a strike at the beginning of the season, Round 1 was played on 25–27 October. Round 30 was rescheduled between rounds 40 and 41.

== Results ==
Home \ Away	ADA	ALY	ALM	BAR	CAR	CEL	CÓR	RCD	ELC	GIM	GIR	GUA	HÉR	HUE	LPA	MUR	NUM	REC	SAB	VLD	VIL	XER
Alcorcón	—	2–1	1–1	2–2	1–0	0–0	2–0	4–0	3–1	0–1	1–0	1–0	1–0	2–0	3–1	3–0	2–2	2–1	1–0	2–2	1–1	0–1
Alcoyano	0–0	—	2–2	1–4	2–2	0–3	3–3	2–0	4–0	0–0	2–1	0–1	0–5	0–3	2–0	1–3	1–1	2–1	2–1	0–1	1–1	0–1
Almería	2–0	1–0	—	1–2	0–0	1–0	2–1	2–0	0–2	3–1	2–2	4–0	1–1	2–1	1–1	4–2	2–0	2–2	3–0	1–1	0–0	1–1
Barcelona B	3–2	2–1	3–3	—	4–0	2–1	2–0	2–3	0–1	1–0	2–2	1–2	0–1	4–2	2–0	1–0	1–1	2–2	0–1	1–2	0–2	2–0
Cartagena	0–2	1–2	1–1	0–4	—	1–1	0–0	2–1	1–1	1–3	1–1	0–2	0–3	2–0	0–0	1–2	2–1	3–1	1–0	0–0	6–2	0–0
Celta de Vigo	3–0	4–0	4–3	4–1	1–0	—	0–0	2–3	1–2	1–0	2–0	2–0	0–1	4–0	1–2	1–0	5–0	4–1	4–1	1–1	2–0	4–1
Córdoba	3–1	3–0	1–1	1–1	2–0	0–0	—	0–2	2–0	4–2	1–0	3–2	3–1	3–1	1–0	2–1	1–0	0–0	0–0	2–0	1–1	2–1
Deportivo La Coruña	2–1	3–0	3–1	2–1	2–1	2–1	2–0	—	4–3	2–2	3–2	4–0	0–1	2–1	3–1	3–1	3–1	1–0	2–1	1–1	1–0	2–1
Elche	6–0	1–2	1–3	3–0	2–1	0–2	0–1	3–2	—	1–0	1–0	2–3	0–3	1–2	1–2	1–0	2–2	0–3	1–1	1–2	3–0	1–0
Gimnàstic	0–2	2–0	1–2	1–1	0–0	1–2	0–0	1–2	1–0	—	1–1	0–0	0–1	1–3	1–3	0–2	1–1	1–2	5–0	0–3	0–1	0–1
Girona	0–0	5–1	0–1	1–1	0–2	0–1	3–1	1–0	1–4	3–2	—	0–0	1–0	1–1	4–2	1–1	2–0	0–0	1–1	1–1	2–1	5–3
Guadalajara	1–2	1–1	0–1	2–0	2–0	0–3	3–1	1–2	2–4	1–0	1–4	—	1–2	2–1	1–1	2–1	1–0	0–2	1–0	0–3	0–2	1–2
Hércules	1–0	1–0	0–0	2–1	2–0	1–0	1–0	1–4	1–2	1–3	4–2	5–0	—	2–0	2–1	0–1	1–3	0–1	1–0	2–2	0–2	2–2
Huesca	0–3	3–3	1–0	0–1	1–0	1–1	0–1	0–2	0–1	0–0	2–1	2–1	1–2	—	2–0	2–2	2–1	0–2	0–0	2–2	1–0	2–1
Las Palmas	2–0	1–0	2–2	3–1	1–2	3–1	0–1	0–1	1–1	1–0	3–2	3–2	2–0	1–3	—	1–1	1–1	0–0	3–2	1–0	3–1	0–0
Murcia	0–2	3–2	0–2	0–2	2–1	1–3	2–1	0–0	0–2	2–2	1–2	2–2	2–6	0–1	1–2	—	2–1	0–3	1–0	2–0	3–1	0–0
Numancia	0–1	2–0	1–0	3–0	0–0	0–2	5–0	0–3	3–0	0–0	1–0	4–0	2–1	1–1	3–2	1–0	—	1–0	2–1	1–4	0–1	2–2
Recreativo	1–2	1–3	0–1	0–0	1–2	1–2	0–1	0–1	1–0	2–2	3–0	4–2	1–0	1–1	4–2	0–2	1–1	—	1–1	1–1	3–1	1–2
Sabadell	1–0	2–2	2–1	0–0	3–2	1–2	0–3	1–0	0–0	1–0	2–3	2–2	1–1	2–1	1–1	2–2	1–3	1–0	—	1–4	3–1	2–0
Valladolid	1–1	2–0	1–1	1–0	2–1	1–2	2–0	0–0	2–1	4–0	1–0	1–3	1–1	3–0	2–1	1–3	2–1	1–0	2–0	—	2–1	2–1
Villarreal B	0–3	4–3	2–1	0–0	0–0	2–3	1–1	0–1	2–0	3–2	2–2	3–3	0–1	4–2	1–4	2–0	0–0	2–0	3–4	0–1	—	3–1
Xerez	2–2	1–0	0–1	0–6	3–0	3–3	1–2	3–2	0–0	0–0	2–1	0–2	2–1	1–3	2–0	3–1	1–2	3–1	2–2	0–4	0–1	—

Source: BDFutbol
Legend: Blue = home team win; Yellow = draw; Red = away team win.

== Promotion play-offs ==
This promotion phase (known as Promoción de ascenso) was to determine the third team which was promoted to 2012–13 La Liga. Teams placed between third and sixth position (excluding reserve teams) took part in the promotion play-offs. Fifth placed faced against the fourth, while the sixth positioned team faced against the third. The first leg of the semi-finals was played on 6 June with the best positioned team playing at home the second leg was played on 10 June. The final was also two-legged, with the first leg on 13 June and the second leg on 16 June, with the best positioned team also playing at home the second leg. This season was introduced the rule in which if a tie was drawn on aggregate and was still drawn after extra time, round of penalties was not used, instead the best positioned team advanced to next round. Valladolid and Alcorcón played the final phase, where Valladolid was winner and promoted to La Liga after a two-year absence. Córdoba and Hércules were eliminated in semi-finals.

=== Play-Offs ===
Semi-finals
5	Hércules	1	0	1
4	Alcorcón (a)	1	0	1
6	Córdoba	0	0	0
3	Valladolid	0	3	3

Final
4	Alcorcón	0	1	1
3	Valladolid	1	1	2

==== Semifinals ====
===== First leg =====
6 June 2012	Hércules	1 – 1	Alcorcón	Alicante
20:00 CEST	Escassi (yellow card) 44'; A. Sardinero 57'; Aganzo (yellow card) 65'; Samuel (yellow card) 73'	Report	Ángel 1'; Manu (yellow card) 55'; O. Riera (yellow card) 89'	Stadium: Rico Pérez; Attendance: 12,000; Referee: Daniel Ocón Arráiz

6 June 2012	Córdoba	0 – 0	Valladolid	Córdoba
22:00 CEST	Caballero (yellow card) 10'; Gaspar (yellow card) 70'; Navarro (yellow card) 70'	Report	Óscar (yellow card) 23'; Pérez (yellow card) 37'; Nafti (yellow card) 73'; Guerra (yellow card) 87'	Stadium: Nuevo Arcángel; Attendance: 11,773; Referee: Eduardo Prieto Iglesias

===== Second leg =====
10 June 2012	Valladolid	3 – 0 (3 – 0 agg.)	Córdoba	Valladolid
20:00 CEST	Rueda (yellow card) 25'; Óscar 50'; Guerra 64'; Sisi (yellow card) 65'; Baraja (yellow card) 84'; Jofre 86', (yellow card) 88'	Report	Gaspar (yellow card) 4'; López Garai (yellow card) 88'; A. García (yellow card) 88'; Dubarbier (yellow card) 89'	Stadium: Nuevo José Zorrilla; Attendance: 18,064; Referee: Santiago Jaime Latre (Aragon)

10 June 2012	Alcorcón	0 – 0 (1a – 1 agg.)	Hércules	Alcorcón
22:00 CEST	Manu (yellow card) 56'; Ángel (yellow card) 84'; Saúl (yellow card) 83'; Mora (yellow card) 89'	Report	Peña (yellow card) 34'; Gilvan (yellow card) 44'; Aganzo (yellow card) 67' (yellow-red card) 89'; Arbilla (yellow card) 89'; Aguilar (yellow card) 89'	Stadium: Santo Domingo; Referee: Jesús Gil Manzano (Extremadura)

==== Final ====
13 June 2012 First Leg	Alcorcón	0 – 1	Valladolid	Alcorcón
21:00 CEST	Nagore (yellow card) 2'; Bermúdez (yellow card) 62'; Rueda (yellow card) 66'	Report	Guerra 29'; Peña (yellow card) 52'; Balenziaga (yellow card) 85'; Baraja (yellow card) 89'	Stadium: Santo Domingo; Attendance: 4,700; Referee: Juan Martínez Munuera (Valencian Community)

16 June 2012 Second Leg	Valladolid	1 – 1 (2 – 1 agg.)	Alcorcón	Valladolid
21:00 CEST	Guerra 52', (yellow card) 64'; Baraja (yellow card) 89'	Report	Rueda (yellow card) 16'; Agus (yellow card) 34'; O. Riera (yellow card) 34'; Sales 44'	Stadium: Nuevo José Zorrilla; Attendance: 26,500; Referee: José Alejandro Hernández Hernández (Las Palmas)

== Awards and season statistics ==
=== Top goalscorers ===
This is the list of goalscorers in accordance with LFP as organising body.

Rank	Player	Club	Goals
1	(Argentina) Leonardo Ulloa	Almería	28
2	(Spain) Iago Aspas	Celta de Vigo	23
3	(Spain) Coro	Girona	18
4	(Spain) Borja García	Córdoba	17
4	(Spain) Javi Guerra	Valladolid	17
6	(Spain) Manuel Gato	Alcoyano	14
6	(Tunisia) Lassad Nouioui	Deportivo	14
8	(Spain) Ángel	Elche	13
8	(Spain) Míchel	Hércules	13
8	(Chile) Fabián Orellana	Celta de Vigo	13
8	(Spain) Óscar	Valladolid	13
8	(Spain) Quini	Alcorcón	13
8	(Spain) Riki	Deportivo	13

- Source: Marca

=== Zamora Trophy ===
The Zamora Trophy is awarded to the goalkeeper with least goals to games ratio.

Goalkeeper	Goals	Matches	Average	Team
(Spain) Jaime	36	40	0.9	Valladolid
(Spain) Manu	42	42	1	Alcorcón
(Spain) Esteban	43	42	1.02	Almería
(Spain) Ismael Falcón	39	38	1.03	Hércules
(Spain) Alberto García	37	36	1.03	Córdoba
(Spain) Daniel Aranzubia	43	38	1.13	Deportivo
(Spain) Manu	44	35	1.26	Recreativo
(Spain) Juan Carlos	49	38	1.29	Elche
(Spain) Rubén Pérez	58	42	1.38	Gimnàstic
(Spain) Diego Mariño	47	34	1.38	Villarreal B

- Source: Marca

=== Fair Play award ===
This award is given annually since 1999 to the team with the best fair play during the season. This ranking takes into account aspects such as cards, suspension of matches, audience behaviour and other penalties. This section not only aims to know this aspect, but also serves to break the tie in teams that are tied in all the other rules: points, head-to-head, goal difference and goals scored.

Rank	Team	Games	Points
1	Barcelona B	42	91
2	Valladolid	42	113
3	Alcorcón	42	117
4	Deportivo La Coruña	42	123
5	Gimnàstic	42	128
6	Celta de Vigo	42	130
7	Recreativo	42	131
8	Córdoba	42	133
9	Sabadell	42	137
10	Girona	42	143
10	Almería	42	144
12	Numancia	42	148
13	Villarreal B	42	156
14	Huesca	42	158
15	Guadalajara	42	164
16	Las Palmas	42	179
16	Xerez	42	179
18	Alcoyano	42	180
19	Hércules	42	185
19	Murcia	42	185
21	Cartagena	42	198
22	Elche	42	211

Source: 2011–12 Fair Play Rankings Season

=== Scoring ===
- First goal of the season: Xabier Etxeita for Elche CF against Girona FC (26 August 2011)
- Fastest goal in a match: 50 seconds – Leonardo Ulloa for UD Almería against Elche CF (23 September 2011)
- Goal scored at the latest point in a match: 90+5 minutes
  - Grégory Béranger for Elche CF against Girona FC (26 August 2011)
  - Gerard for Villarreal CF B against Xerez CD (10 December 2011)
- Widest winning margin: 6
  - Elche CF 6–0 AD Alcorcón (16 December 2011)
  - Xerez CD 0–6 FC Barcelona B (3 June 2012)
- Most goals in a match: 8
  - Girona FC 5–3 Xerez CD (10 March 2012)
  - Real Murcia 2–6 Hércules CF (14 April 2012)
  - FC Cartagena 6–2 Villarreal CF B (27 May 2012)
- First hat-trick of the season: Joselu for Villarreal CF B against Gimnàstic de Tarragona (30 September 2011)
- Most goals by one player in a single match: 3
  - Joselu for Villarreal CF B against Gimnàstic de Tarragona (30 September 2011)
  - Ángel for Elche CF against AD Alcorcón (16 December 2011)
  - Javi Guerra for Real Valladolid against CE Sabadell FC (7 January 2012)
  - Leonardo Ulloa for UD Almería against Guadalajara (14 January 2012)
  - Óscar for Real Valladolid against Gimnàstic de Tarragona (5 February 2012)
  - Julio Álvarez for CD Numancia against Elche CF (17 March 2012)
  - Jesús Berrocal for Recreativo de Huelva against CD Guadalajara (7 April 2012)
  - Coro for Girona FC against CD Guadalajara (5 May 2012)
  - Dani Nieto for Girona FC against CD Alcoyano (12 May 2012)
  - Quini for AD Alcorcón against Elche CF (16 May 2012)
- Most goals by one team in a match: 6
  - Elche CF 6–0 AD Alcorcón (16 December 2011)
  - Real Murcia 2–6 Hércules CF (14 April 2012)
  - FC Cartagena 6–2 Villarreal CF B (27 May 2012)
  - Xerez CD 0–6 FC Barcelona B (3 June 2012)
- First own goal of the season: Ruymán Hernández for CD Guadalajara against UD Las Palmas (27 August 2011)
- Most goals in one half by one team: 4
  - Elche CF 6–0 AD Alcorcón (16 December 2011)
  - CD Numancia 5–0 Córdoba CF (18 February 2012)
  - Hércules CF 4–2 Girona FC (6 April 2012)
  - Real Murcia 2–6 Hércules CF (14 April 2012)
  - Celta de Vigo 4–1 FC Barcelona B (28 April 2012)
  - Villarreal CF B 1–4 UD Las Palmas (5 May 2012)
  - CD Alcoyano 0–5 Hércules CF (23 May 2012)
  - Xerez CD 0–6 FC Barcelona B (3 June 2012)
- Most goals scored by losing team: 3
  - Villarreal CF B 3–4 CE Sabadell FC (3 September 2011)
  - Girona FC 5–3 Xerez CD (10 March 2012)
  - Deportivo de La Coruña 4–3 Elche CF (22 April 2012)

=== Discipline ===
- First yellow card: Sergio Mantecón for Elche CF against Girona FC (26 August 2011)
- First red card: Richy for Girona FC against Elche CF (26 August 2011)

== Teams by autonomous community ==
	Autonomous community	Number of teams	Teams
1	Andalusia	4	Almería, Córdoba, Recreativo and Xerez
1	Catalonia	4	Barcelona B, Gimnàstic, Girona and Sabadell
1	Valencian Community	4	Alcoyano, Elche, Hércules and Villarreal B
4	Castile and León	2	Numancia and Valladolid
4	Galicia	2	Celta de Vigo and Deportivo La Coruña
4	Region of Murcia	2	Cartagena and Murcia
7	Aragon	1	Huesca
7	Canary Islands	1	Las Palmas
7	Castile-La Mancha	1	Guadalajara
7	Community of Madrid	1	Alcorcón

== See also ==
- List of Spanish football transfers summer 2011
- List of Spanish football transfers winter 2011–12
- 2011–12 La Liga
- 2012 Segunda División play-offs
- 2011–12 Segunda División B
- 2011–12 Copa del Rey
