= Luis César Sampedro =

Spanish footballer and manager (born 1966)

Luis César
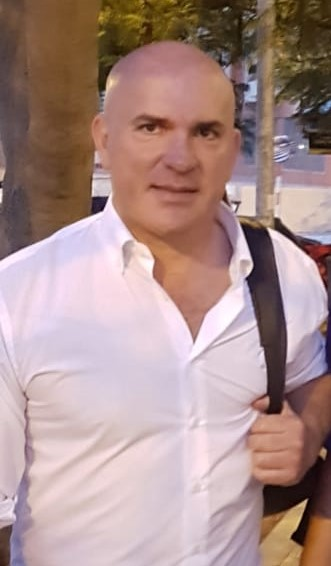
- Luis César in 2019

Personal information
- Full name: Luis Ángel César Sampedro
- Date of birth: 3 May 1966 (age 60)
- Place of birth: Vilagarcía de Arousa, Spain
- Height: 1.79 m (5 ft 10 1/2 in)
- Position: Goalkeeper

Youth career
- Tótem
- Faxilde

Senior career*
Years	Team	Apps	(Gls)
1984–1987	Arosa		
1987–1992	Lalín	110	(1)
1992–2000	Racing Ferrol	161	(0)
Total		271	(1)

Managerial career
- 2000–2004: Racing Ferrol
- 2004–2007: Gimnàstic
- 2007–2008: Poli Ejido
- 2010: Gimnàstic
- 2012: Alcoyano
- 2013–2016: Albacete
- 2016–2017: Lugo
- 2017–2018: Valladolid
- 2019: Tenerife
- 2019: Deportivo La Coruña
- 2021: Lugo
- 2025: Gimnàstic
- * Club domestic league appearances and goals

Luis Ángel César Sampedro (born 3 May 1966), known as Luis César, is a Spanish former footballer who played as a goalkeeper, currently a manager.

== Playing career ==
Born in Vilagarcía de Arousa, Province of Pontevedra, Luis César played for Racing de Ferrol for nearly a decade, never appearing in higher than Segunda División B.

In 2000, precisely after the Galician club returned to the Segunda División after a 21-year absence, he retired from the game at the age of 34.

== Coaching career ==
Immediately after retiring, César began coaching his only club, being relegated from division two in his third season and promoting immediately. In 2004, he signed with another team in the second tier, Gimnàstic de Tarragona.

Luis César led Nàstic to La Liga in the 2005–06 campaign, with the Catalans returning to the tournament after 56 years. On 26 November 2006, however, after a 2–3 home loss against Mallorca, with the side having only totalled five points in 12 rounds, he was fired.

For 2007–08, César signed for Polideportivo Ejido in the second division, but did not finish the season once more, being sacked after the 21st matchday (out of 42), with Fernando Castro Santos taking his place as the Andalusians were relegated after a seven-year stay in the competition. On 6 March 2010, months after a move to Las Palmas was eventually aborted, he returned to Gimnàstic after the dismissal of César Ferrando, with the team eventually finishing in 18th position – the first place above the relegation zone – just one point ahead of Cádiz.

On 6 December 2010, following a 1–2 home defeat to Villarreal B, Luis César was relieved of his duties at Gimnàstic, as the team ranked 22nd and last with just two wins in 15 games. In the 2011–12 campaign, he was one of two managers in charge of Alcoyano, who were finally relegated from the second tier.

Luis César was appointed at Albacete on 20 March 2013, leading it to promotion at the end of his first full season. He was fired on 12 March 2016, and continued to work in division two with Lugo (two spells), Real Valladolid, Tenerife and Deportivo de La Coruña.

On 11 May 2025, after more than four years without a club, Luis César returned to Gimnàstic for a third spell on a contract until June 2026. On 3 November, however, he was sacked.

== Managerial statistics ==
As of match played 17 April 2021

Managerial record by team and tenure
Team	Nat	From	To	Record								Ref
Team	Nat	From	To	G	W	D	L	GF	GA	GD	Win %	Ref
Racing Ferrol	(Spain)	30 June 2000	1 July 2004	176	63	48	65	212	213	−1	35.80	
Gimnàstic	(Spain)	1 July 2004	26 November 2006	103	43	21	39	118	119	−1	41.75	
Poli Ejido	(Spain)	28 June 2007	21 January 2008	22	5	5	12	18	33	−15	22.73	
Gimnàstic	(Spain)	6 March 2010	6 December 2010	31	6	9	16	28	43	−15	19.35	
Alcoyano	(Spain)	21 March 2012	4 June 2012	13	3	1	9	16	30	−14	23.08	
Albacete	(Spain)	19 March 2013	12 March 2016	131	55	33	43	172	156	+16	41.98	
Lugo	(Spain)	15 June 2016	15 June 2017	43	14	13	16	50	54	−4	32.56	
Valladolid	(Spain)	23 June 2017	10 April 2018	38	16	9	13	60	49	+11	42.11	
Tenerife	(Spain)	13 May 2019	11 June 2019	4	2	1	1	3	4	−1	50.00	
Deportivo La Coruña	(Spain)	7 October 2019	27 December 2019	12	2	4	6	8	18	−10	16.67	
Lugo	(Spain)	2 March 2021	19 April 2021	8	0	3	5	3	14	−11	0.00	
Gimnàstic	(Spain)	11 May 2025	3 November 2025	17	7	4	6	22	23	−1	41.18	
Total				598	216	151	231	710	756	−46	36.12	—
