= Juan Merino =

Spanish retired footballer (born 1970)

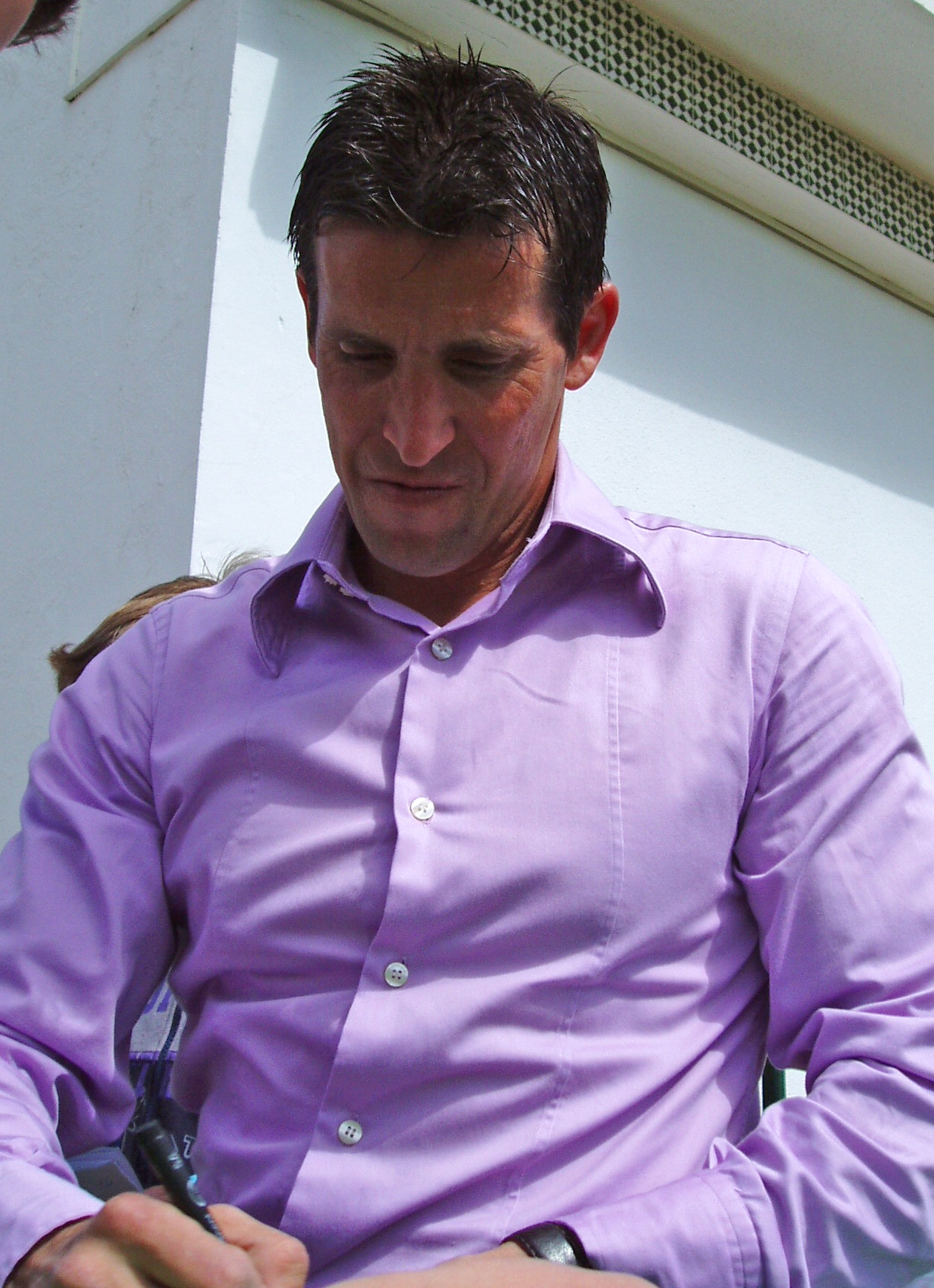
- Merino in 2008

Personal information
- Full name: Juan Merino Ruiz
- Date of birth: 24 August 1970 (age 56)
- Place of birth: La Línea, Spain
- Height: 1.76 m (5 ft 9 1/2 in)
- Position: Centre-back

Youth career
- Betis

Senior career*
Years	Team	Apps	(Gls)
1989–1990	Betis B	11	(0)
1990–2002	Betis	315	(3)
2002–2007	Recreativo	137	(1)
Total		463	(4)

International career
1991	Spain U21	1	(0)
1991–1992	Spain U23	6	(1)

Managerial career
- 2010–2011: Recreativo (assistant)
- 2011: Xerez
- 2014–2016: Betis B
- 2014: Betis (caretaker)
- 2016: Betis
- 2016–2017: Gimnàstic
- 2017: Córdoba
- 2019: UCAM Murcia
- * Club domestic league appearances and goals

Juan Merino Ruiz (born 24 August 1970) is a Spanish former professional footballer who played mainly as a central defender, currently a manager.

He played solely in Andalusia in an 18-year career, with Betis and Recreativo. He appeared in more than 200 matches in both La Liga and the Segunda División.

Subsequently, Merino worked as a manager, including jobs at his former clubs.

== Playing career ==
Born in La Línea de la Concepción, Province of Cádiz, Merino joined Real Betis's first team in 1990, becoming their captain in later years. Out of his 12 years at the club eight were in La Liga, and he appeared in 203 games in that division, scoring two goals; in the 1996–97 season, he contributed 36 matches to help to a fourth-place finish.

In 2002–03, staying in Andalusia, Merino signed a two-year contract with Recreativo de Huelva. In his first season the side was relegated, regaining top-flight status in 2006 as champions. After featuring in 23 games in the 2006–07 campaign he retired from football, with 522 professional appearances to his credit.

== Coaching career ==
Immediately after retiring, Merino rejoined Betis as director of football. He was named assistant coach in 2009, going on to work with two different managers.

In the 2010–11 season, Merino cut ties with Betis and returned to Recre as assistant to Pablo Alfaro – a former Sevilla FC defender – with the club in the Segunda División. The latter was fired in mid-October after only eight games (four draws and four losses), and the former stayed on as second in command to Carlos Ríos.

Merino was named manager of Xerez CD on 14 June 2011. He was sacked on 4 December, due to poor results.

On 25 June 2014, after nearly three years without a club, Merino was appointed at the helm of Betis B. On 25 November, after Julio Velázquez's dismissal from the first team, he was named interim manager; he remained in charge for four league matches, achieving as many wins before being replaced by Pepe Mel and returning to his previous duties.

On 11 January 2016, Merino was again appointed caretaker manager at Betis, following Mel's sacking. On 3 February, he was chosen to remain in the position until the end of the season.

On 25 May 2016, after the arrival of new boss Gus Poyet, Merino left Betis. On 28 December, he took over at second-tier club Gimnàstic de Tarragona in the place of Vicente Moreno, but was himself relieved of his duties the following 20 May as the team was still in the relegation zone.

On 18 October 2017, Merino replaced the dismissed Luis Carrión at the helm of Córdoba CF, still in the second division. He was fired on 7 December after winning none and drawing three of his seven fixtures.

Merino returned to management on 29 April 2019, taking over from Pedro Munitis at UCAM Murcia CF and tasked with taking the team to play-offs of Segunda División B in their final three games.

== Managerial statistics ==
As of 19 May 2019

Managerial record by team and tenure
Team	Nat	From	To	Record								Ref
Team	Nat	From	To	G	W	D	L	GF	GA	GD	Win %	Ref
Xerez	(Spain)	14 June 2011	5 December 2011	17	4	5	8	15	21	−6	23.53	
Betis B	(Spain)	25 June 2014	11 January 2016	54	18	10	26	57	68	−11	33.33	
Betis (caretaker)	(Spain)	25 November 2014	23 December 2014	6	4	0	2	10	6	+4	66.67	
Betis	(Spain)	11 January 2016	25 May 2016	20	6	7	7	21	28	−7	30.00	
Gimnàstic	(Spain)	28 December 2016	20 May 2017	20	6	9	5	25	23	+2	30.00	
Córdoba	(Spain)	18 October 2017	4 December 2017	7	0	3	4	5	11	−6	0.00	
UCAM Murcia	(Spain)	29 April 2019	11 June 2019	3	2	0	1	4	4	+0	66.67	
Career total				127	40	34	53	137	161	−24	31.50	—

== Honours ==
Recreativo

- Segunda División: 2005–06
