= UD San Lorenzo de Flumen =

San Lorenzo de Flumen
- Full name: Unión Deportiva San Lorenzo
- Founded: 1968
- Ground: José Trallero, San Lorenzo del Flumen, Lalueza, Aragón, Spain
- Capacity: 1,000
- Chairman: (Spain) Jose Manuel Abadias
- Manager: (Spain) Rafael Giménez
- League: Regional Preferente – Group 1
- 2024–25: Primera Regional – Group 2, 2nd of 18 (promoted)
Home colours	Away colours

Unión Deportiva San Lorenzo is a Spanish football team based in San Lorenzo del Flumen, Lalueza, in the community of Aragón. Founded in 1968, it plays in Regional Preferente – Group 1.

== Season to season ==
Season	Tier	Division	Place	Copa del Rey
1973–74	7	2ª Reg.	6th	
1974–75	7	2ª Reg.	7th	
1975–76	7	2ª Reg.	10th	
1976–77	DNP			
1977–78	7	2ª Reg.	10th	
1978–1990	DNP			
1990–91	7	2ª Reg.	14th	
1991–92	7	2ª Reg.	2nd	
1992–93	7	2ª Reg.	5th	
1993–94	7	2ª Reg.	1st	
1994–95	7	2ª Reg.	6th	
1995–96	7	2ª Reg.	1st	
1996–97	6	1ª Reg.	8th	
1997–98	6	1ª Reg.	2nd	
1998–99	5	Reg. Pref.	17th	
1999–2000	6	1ª Reg.	1st	
2000–01	5	Reg. Pref.	13th	
2001–02	5	Reg. Pref.	15th	
2002–03	6	1ª Reg.	2nd	
2003–04	5	Reg. Pref.	3rd	

Season	Tier	Division	Place	Copa del Rey
2004–05	5	Reg. Pref.	5th	
2005–06	5	Reg. Pref.	5th	
2006–07	5	Reg. Pref.	2nd	
2007–08	4	3ª	12th	
2008–09	4	3ª	17th	
2009–10	5	Reg. Pref.	5th	
2010–11	5	Reg. Pref.	10th	
2011–12	5	Reg. Pref.	14th	
2012–13	5	Reg. Pref.	7th	
2013–14	5	Reg. Pref.	7th	
2014–15	5	Reg. Pref.	16th	
2015–16	6	1ª Reg.	1st	
2016–17	5	Reg. Pref.	9th	
2017–18	5	Reg. Pref.	3rd	
2018–19	4	3ª	17th	
2019–20	5	Reg. Pref.	17th	
2020–21	5	Reg. Pref.	2nd	
2021–22	6	Reg. Pref.	14th	
2022–23	7	1ª Reg.	8th	
2023–24	7	1ª Reg.	6th	

Season	Tier	Division	Place	Copa del Rey
2024–25	7	1ª Reg.	2nd	
2025–26	6	Reg. Pref.		

- 3 seasons in Tercera División

== Honours ==
- Copa Federación Centro
  - Winners (1): 1952–53
