= Marcén =

- Locality
- Location within Aragon Location within Spain
- Coordinates: 41°55′57″N 0°16′54″W
- Country: Spain
- Autonomous community: Aragon
- Province: Province of Huesca
- Municipality: Lalueza
- Elevation: 381 m (1,250 ft)

Population
  - Total: 58

Marcén is a locality located in the municipality of Lalueza, in Huesca province, Aragon, Spain. As of 2020, it has a population of 58.

== Geography ==
Marcén is located 44km south-southeast of Huesca.
