= Juanma (footballer, born 1972) =

Spanish footballer and manager

Personal information
- Full name: Juan Manuel Rodríguez Domínguez
- Date of birth: 28 February 1972 (age 54)
- Place of birth: Huelva, Spain
- Height: 1.88 m (6 ft 2 in)
- Position: Centre back

Team information
- Current team: Recreativo B (coach)

Youth career
- Recreativo

Senior career*
Years	Team	Apps	(Gls)
1992–1998	Recreativo	127	(0)
1992–1993	→ Cortegana (loan)		
1998–2000	Ceuta	46	(0)
2000–2001	Algeciras	20	(0)
2001–2002	Estoril	1	(0)
2002–2003	Linense		
2003–2006	Bollullos		
2006–2007	Punta Umbría		

Managerial career
- 2007–2009: Recreativo (assistant)
- 2011–2012: Recreativo (assistant)
- 2012: Recreativo
- 2012–2013: Recreativo (assistant)
- 2016–: Recreativo B
- * Club domestic league appearances and goals

Juan Manuel Rodríguez Domínguez (born 28 February 1972), commonly known as Juanma, is a Spanish retired footballer who played as a central defender, and the current manager of Recreativo de Huelva B.

== Playing career ==
Born in Huelva, Andalusia, Juanma finished his formation with Recreativo de Huelva, and made his senior debuts while on loan at Club Atlético Cortegana. He returned from loan in the 1993 summer, being immediately assigned to the main squad in Segunda División B.

Juanma appeared regularly in the following campaigns, but eventually lost his starting spot in 1997–98 as his side was promoted to Segunda División. In the 1998 summer he left Recre and moved to AD Ceuta also in the third level.

In 2001 Juanma moved abroad for the first time in his career, joining G.D. Estoril Praia after a spell at Algeciras CF. After appearing in only one match he returned to his native country, signing for Bollullos CF.

Juanma eventually played in the lower leagues for the remainder of his career, and retired with CD Punta Umbría.

== Post-playing career ==
After his retirement Juanma became Manolo Zambrano's assistant at his first club Recreativo, and maintained his role under Lucas Alcaraz. He left the club in 2009, but returned on 14 June 2011, as Juan Carlos Ríos' second.

On 10 March 2012 Juanma was appointed manager of the main squad, after Álvaro Cervera's resignation. He only achieved two wins in 15 games, as his side narrowly avoided relegation; he returned to his previous role after the end of the season, and left Recre in the 2013 summer.
