= Ángel Royo =

Spanish football manager (born 1966)

Personal information
- Full name: Ángel Royo Areste
- Date of birth: 12 August 1966 (age 60)
- Place of birth: Sariñena, Spain

Team information
- Current team: Almudévar (coach)

Youth career
- Years: Team
- Sariñena

Managerial career
- 1992–1996: Sariñena (youth)
- 1997–1999: Lalueza
- 1999: Peralta
- 2000–2002: Lanaja
- 2002–2004: Almudévar
- 2004–2009: San Lorenzo
- 2009–2010: Barbastro
- 2010: Atlético Monzón
- 2010–2011: Huesca (assistant)
- 2011: Huesca
- 2012: Huesca (interim)
- 2016–: Almudévar

Ángel Royo Areste (born 12 August 1966) is a Spanish football manager, currently in charge of AD Almudévar.

== Managerial career ==
Born in Sariñena, Huesca, Aragon, Royo suffered a serious injury while playing for CD Sariñena's youth setup, which subsequently ended his career as a footballer. He started working as a manager with the club's youth setup, and subsequently coached teams in his native region, his longest spell being with UD San Lorenzo.

In May 2010 Royo was appointed Atlético Monzón manager, but left the club two months later, being named assistant at SD Huesca.

On 8 June 2011 Royo was appointed manager of Huesca, replacing Onésimo Sánchez. On 3 October, after winning two of six matches, he was relieved from his duties and joined the club's board.

On 10 December 2012 Royo was named interim manager of the azulgranas, in the place of fired Antonio Calderón. On the 26th, after two losses, he returned to his previous role, being replaced by Jorge D'Alessandro.
