= Vicente Moreno =

Spanish football player/manager (born 1974)

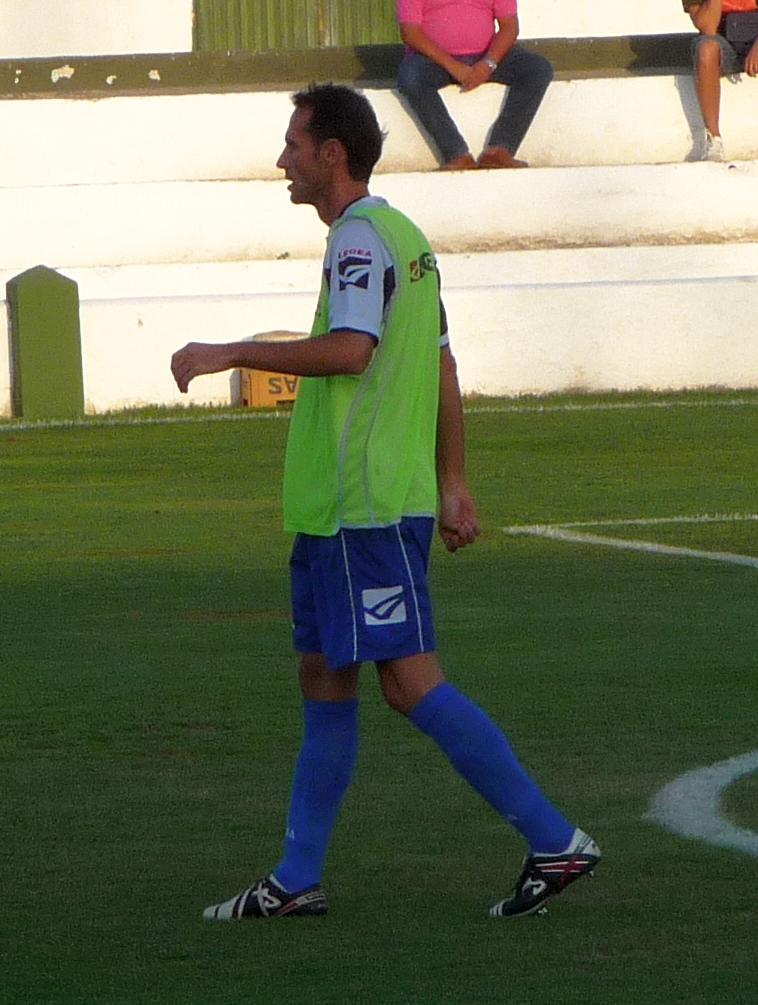
- Moreno with Xerez in 2009

Personal information
- Full name: Vicente Moreno Peris
- Date of birth: 26 October 1974 (age 52)
- Place of birth: Massanassa, Spain
- Height: 1.88 m (6 ft 2 in)
- Position: Defensive midfielder

Team information
- Current team: Al-Rayyan (manager)

Youth career
- Catarroja
- Levante
- 1992–1994: Valencia

Senior career*
Years	Team	Apps	(Gls)
1994–1998	Valencia B	90	(9)
1998–1999	Ontinyent	36	(4)
1999–2000	Guadix	34	(11)
2000–2011	Xerez	392	(20)
Total		552	(44)

Managerial career
- 2011: Xerez (assistant)
- 2011–2012: Xerez
- 2013–2016: Gimnàstic
- 2017–2020: Mallorca
- 2020–2022: Espanyol
- 2022–2023: Al Shabab
- 2023: Almería
- 2024–2025: Osasuna
- 2025–2026: Al-Wakrah
- 2026–: Al-Rayyan
- * Club domestic league appearances and goals

Vicente Moreno Peris (born 26 October 1974) is a Spanish former professional footballer who played as a defensive midfielder. He is the manager of Qatar Stars League club Al-Rayyan.

He spent most of his career with Xerez, appearing in 412 official matches and remaining with the club for 11 years. He also coached them for seven months, and subsequently led Mallorca and Espanyol to La Liga promotions.

== Playing career ==
An unsuccessful Valencia youth graduate, Moreno was born in Massanassa, Valencian Community, and he arrived to Xerez in 2000–01 after spending one season each with lowly clubs, also in the Segunda División B. Helping the Andalusians promote to Segunda División in his first year, he never played less than 34 matches until 2009.

In the 2008–09 campaign, Moreno was ever-present for Xerez as they achieved a first-ever La Liga promotion. On 13 June 2009, he scored one goal in a 2–1 home win over Huesca which certified his team's promotion.

Moreno made his top-tier debut on 30 August 2009 – two months shy of his 35th birthday – playing the full 90 minutes of the 2–0 away loss against Mallorca. He also started in the third match, a 5–0 defeat to Real Madrid at the Santiago Bernabéu Stadium, but eventually lost his importance, with Malian Sidi Keita being preferred; at the end of the season, albeit only in the last round, the side were immediately relegated.

In June 2011, aged 36, Moreno retired from football after one more season with Xerez (28 appearances, three goals). At the time of his retirement he was the player with the most appearances for the club, also having been the only one to have scored for the organisation in all three major levels of Spanish football. He immediately joined their coaching staff.

== Coaching career ==
On 5 December 2011, Moreno replaced Juan Merino at the helm of Xerez. He managed to lead the team to the 14th position, ten points above the relegation zone in the second tier.

Moreno was appointed as Gimnàstic de Tarragona manager on 4 November 2013, taking over from the fired Santi Castillejo at the third-division side. On 22 June 2015, after winning promotion, he renewed his contract for a further year.

On 13 June 2016, having finished third in the regular season and only missing out on another promotion in the play-offs, Moreno extended his link until 2018. He announced he was stepping down on 24 December, however, and the club accepted it three days later.

Moreno was presented as manager of Mallorca in the third division on 20 June 2017. He achieved two consecutive promotions in his first two years, both in the play-offs, followed by an instant relegation in the 2019–20 campaign.

Moreno subsequently left the Visit Mallorca Stadium, and joined fellow relegated side Espanyol on a three-year contract in August 2020. They achieved promotion at the first attempt, as champions.

On 28 July 2022, Moreno was appointed at Saudi Pro League club Al Shabab on a one-year deal. He returned to Spain in June 2023, signing with top-flight Almería but being dismissed on 29 September after no wins in seven matches.

On 27 May 2024, Moreno joined Osasuna of the main division, with the one-year contract being effective as of 1 July. On 14 May 2025, with the team in a comfortable mid-table position, he announced he would leave at the end of the season.

Moreno became head coach of Qatar Stars League's Al-Wakrah on 29 June 2025, signing a two-year deal.

== Managerial statistics ==
As of 23 October 2026

Managerial record by team and tenure
Team	Nat	From	To	Record								Ref
Team	Nat	From	To	G	W	D	L	GF	GA	GD	Win %	Ref
Xerez	(Spain)	5 December 2011	12 July 2012	26	9	6	11	35	46	−11	34.62	
Gimnàstic	(Spain)	4 November 2013	27 December 2016	147	62	50	35	186	151	+35	42.18	
Mallorca	(Spain)	19 June 2017	4 August 2020	133	56	33	44	162	141	+21	42.11	
Espanyol	(Spain)	4 August 2020	13 May 2022	85	38	21	26	120	88	+32	44.71	
Al Shabab	(Saudi Arabia)	28 July 2022	17 June 2023	37	20	8	9	70	39	+31	54.05	
Almería	(Spain)	17 June 2023	29 September 2023	7	0	2	5	8	18	−10	0.00	
Osasuna	(Spain)	27 May 2024	24 May 2025	43	16	16	11	63	59	+4	37.21	
Al-Wakrah	(Qatar)	29 June 2025	23 March 2026	30	8	8	14	46	52	−6	26.67	
Al-Rayyan	(Qatar)	23 March 2026	present	20	11	7	2	45	21	+24	55.00	
Total				528	220	151	157	733	615	+118	41.67	—

== Honours ==
=== Player ===
Xerez

- Segunda División: 2008–09

=== Manager ===
Gimnàstic

- Segunda División B: 2014–15

Mallorca

- Segunda División B: 2017–18

Espanyol

- Segunda División: 2020–21

Al-Rayyan

- QSL Cup: 2025–26
- AGCFF Gulf Club Champions League: 2025–26

Individual

- Saudi Pro League Manager of the Month: August & September 2022, October 2022, February 2023
