= Lalueza =

Coordinates: 41°50′N 0°15′W

Lalueza A Lueza
- municipality
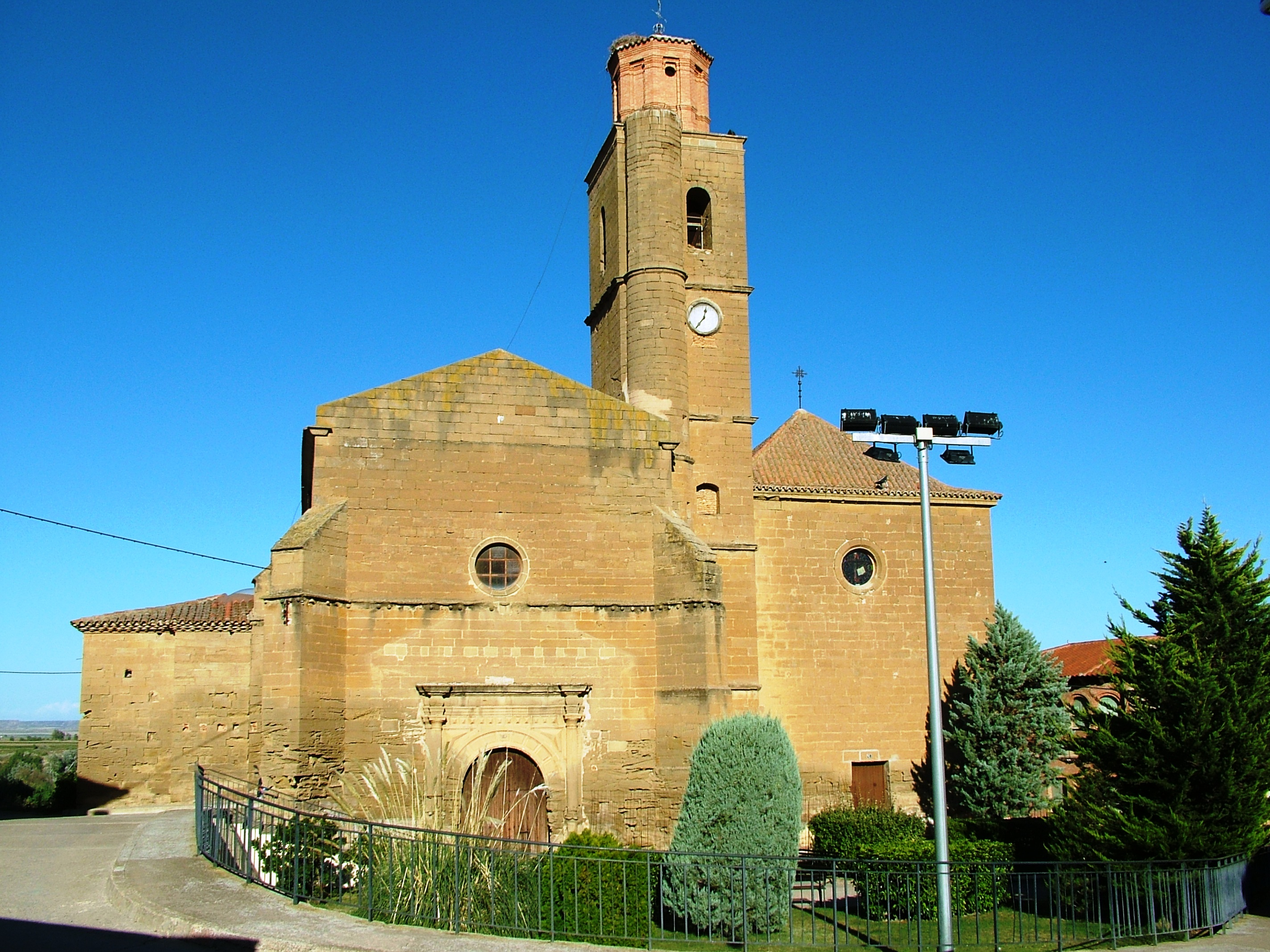

- Flag Coat of arms
- Interactive map of Lalueza
- Country: Spain
- Autonomous community: Aragon
- Province: Huesca

Area
  - Total: 88 km^{2} (34 sq mi)

Population (2025-01-01)
  - Total: 849
  - Density: 9.6/km^{2} (25/sq mi)
- Time zone: UTC+1 (CET)
  - Summer (DST): UTC+2 (CEST)

Lalueza (Aragonese A Lueza) is a municipality in the province of Huesca, Aragon, Spain. According to the 2004 census (INE), the municipality has a population of 1,140 inhabitants.

== Geography ==
The nearest towns are Orillena, Sodeto, Marcén, and San Lorenzo del Flumen last one is also, with Marcén, a neighborhood part of Lalueza City.

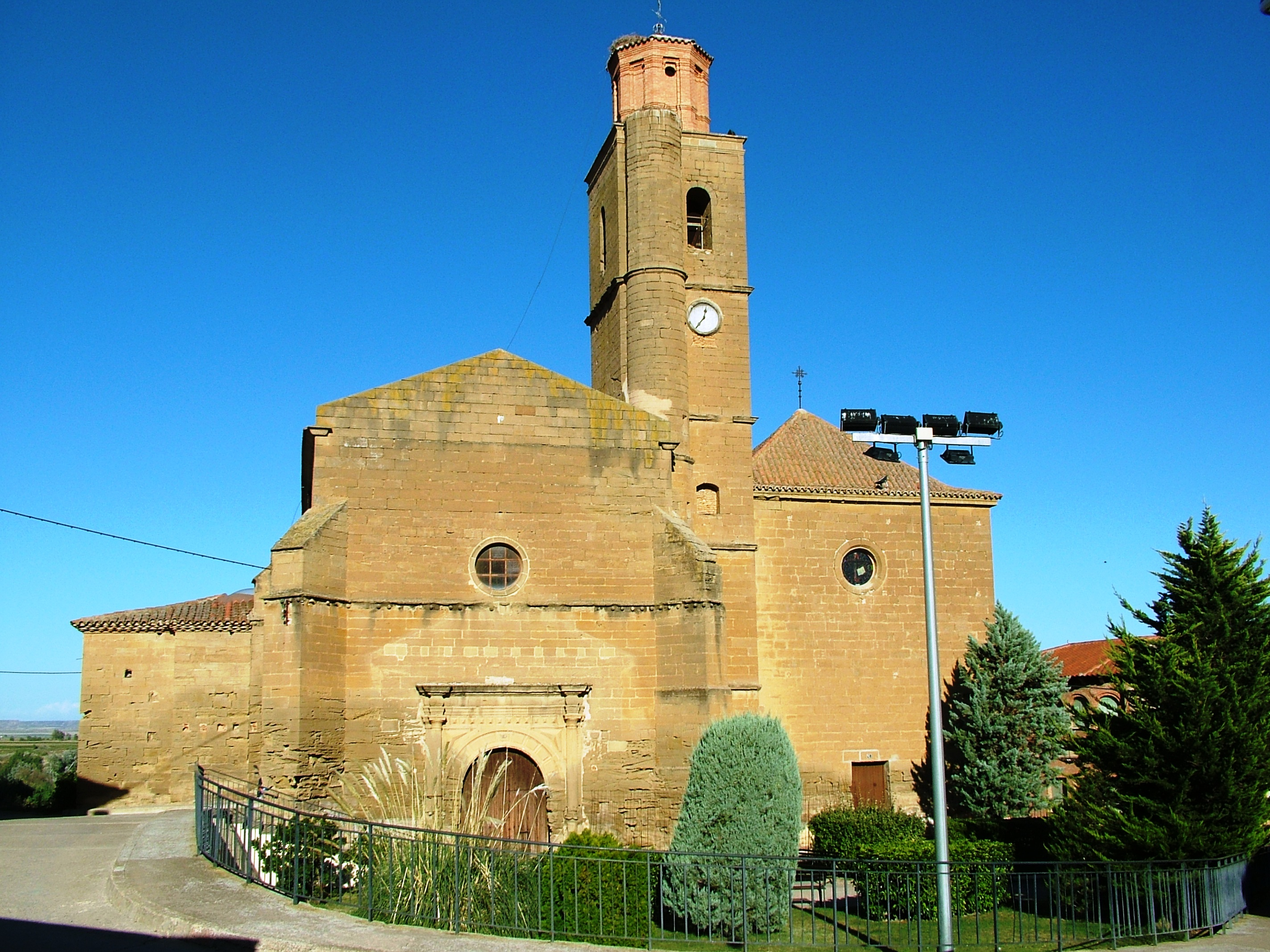
San Juan church in Lalueza

== See also ==
- List of municipalities in Huesca
