= Sergio Mantecón =

Spanish footballer (born 1980)

Personal information
- Full name: Sergio Martínez Mantecón
- Date of birth: 8 June 1980 (age 46)
- Place of birth: Madrid, Spain
- Height: 1.74 m (5 ft 9 in)
- Position: Defensive midfielder

Team information
- Current team: Elche (technical secretary)

Youth career
- Real Madrid

Senior career*
Years	Team	Apps	(Gls)
1999–2001	Badajoz B		
2001–2003	Badajoz	74	(1)
2003–2006	Alicante	106	(5)
2006–2008	Hércules	21	(0)
2008	Ponferradina	16	(4)
2008–2010	Castellón	68	(5)
2010–2014	Elche	115	(3)
2014–2017	Cádiz	55	(1)
2017	Lorca Deportiva	12	(0)
Total		467+	(19+)

Managerial career
- 2021: Elche (interim)
- 2022: Elche (interim)
- * Club domestic league appearances and goals

Sergio Martínez Mantecón (born 8 June 1980) is a Spanish former professional footballer who played as a defensive midfielder. He is currently technical secretary of La Liga club Elche.

He appeared in 270 Segunda División games over ten seasons, totalling nine goals for Badajoz, Hércules, Castellón, Elche and Cádiz. He played 12 games in La Liga with Elche.

== Playing career ==
Born in Madrid, Mantecón finished his youth career with local giants Real Madrid, but made his senior debut with CD Badajoz's reserves. He played his first professional game with the latter's first team on 3 January 2001, coming on as a second-half substitute in a 0–4 home loss against Racing de Santander in the round of 32 of the Copa del Rey. He finished the league season with eight Segunda División appearances.

Mantecón was a regular starter for the Extremaduran side in the following two years, being relegated in 2003. In August, he signed with Alicante CF of Segunda División B, going on to take part in the promotion playoffs twice but falling consecutively short.

On 29 June 2006, Mantecón joined Hércules CF in the second division. He was regularly utilised in first season but left out of the squad in his second, and moved to third-tier SD Ponferradina in January 2008.

Mantecón agreed to a two-year contract with CD Castellón on 24 June 2008. Having experienced another relegation in 2010, he joined fellow second-division Elche CF in the off-season. He started in 25 of his 39 matches in 2012–13 as they returned to La Liga after more than two decades, then signed a new one-year deal.

On 19 August 2013, the 33-year-old Mantecón made his debut in the Spanish top flight, replacing David Generelo midway through the second half of a 3–0 away defeat to Rayo Vallecano. After only 12 appearances and two starts during the campaign, he was released in June 2014 and moved to Cádiz CF of the third level.

In February 2017, Mantecón signed with Tercera División club CF Lorca Deportiva, and retired four months later. In July, he returned to Elche as part of the technical staff.

== Coaching career ==
Mantecón served as interim manager to Elche's main squad on 29 November 2021 for a top-flight match against CA Osasuna, following Fran Escribá's dismissal. He oversaw a 1–1 draw at the El Sadar Stadium.

== Honours ==
Elche

- Segunda División: 2012–13
