= San Lorenzo del Flumen =

- Locality
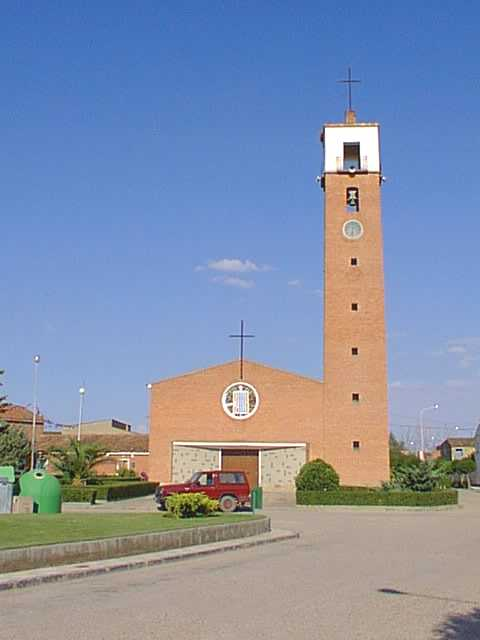

- Location within Aragon Location within Spain
- Coordinates: 41°52′19″N 0°11′59″W
- Country: Spain
- Autonomous community: Aragon
- Province: Province of Huesca
- Municipality: Lalueza
- Elevation: 303 m (994 ft)

Population
  - Total: 313

San Lorenzo del Flumen is a locality located in the municipality of Lalueza, in Huesca province, Aragon, Spain. As of 2020, it has a population of 313.

== Geography ==
San Lorenzo del Flumen is located 53km southeast of Huesca.
