= Gaspar Gálvez =

Spanish footballer (born 1979)

Personal information
- Full name: Gaspar Gálvez Burgos
- Date of birth: 7 July 1979 (age 47)
- Place of birth: Córdoba, Spain
- Height: 1.83 m (6 ft 0 in)
- Position: Defender

Youth career
- Séneca
- Atlético Madrid

Senior career*
Years	Team	Apps	(Gls)
1997–2000	Atlético Madrid B	31	(0)
1998–2000	Atlético Madrid	36	(0)
2001	Oviedo	18	(0)
2001–2003	Valladolid	36	(0)
2003–2004	Atlético Madrid	27	(0)
2004–2005	Albacete	25	(1)
2005–2008	Alavés	80	(1)
2008–2013	Córdoba	103	(2)
2013–2014	Mirandés	8	(0)
2014–2015	Huesca	17	(1)
Total		381	(5)

International career
1998	Spain U18	1	(0)
1998–2000	Spain U21	4	(0)

Managerial career
- 2018–2021: Córdoba (youth)
- 2021–2024: Córdoba B (assistant)
- 2024–2026: Córdoba B
- * Club domestic league appearances and goals

Gaspar Gálvez Burgos (born 7 July 1979) is a Spanish former professional footballer who played as a defender, and a current manager.

He started his career with Atlético Madrid, and went on amass La Liga totals of 156 games and one goal over eight seasons, also representing in the competition Oviedo, Valladolid, Albacete and Alavés. He added 208 matches and three goals in the Segunda División, mainly at the service of Córdoba.

== Club career ==
Gálvez was born in Córdoba, Andalusia. A product of Atlético Madrid's youth system, he made his first-team – and La Liga – debut on 3 January 1999 in a 3–2 away win against Racing de Santander where he came on as a late substitute, and alternated between the A and B sides for several years; at the end of his second professional season, the former were relegated to Segunda División for the only time in their history.

Following a six-month spell at Real Oviedo, with another top-flight relegation, Gálvez signed with Real Valladolid for two seasons, being re-bought by Atlético afterwards. He was released at the end of a sole campaign, and was subsequently successively relegated from the main division with Albacete Balompié (where he scored his first goal as a professional, in a 1–1 draw at Levante UD on 18 December 2004) and Deportivo Alavés.

Gálvez then played two more years in the second tier with the Basques, returning to hometown's Córdoba CF in summer 2008 also in that league. He alternated between the starting XI and the bench until his departure in June 2013.

Gálvez retired in January 2015 aged 35, after spells at CD Mirandés (second division) and SD Huesca (Segunda División B).

== International career ==
Gálvez was pre-selected by Spain for the 1999 FIFA World Youth Championship, but eventually did not make the final cut as the national side went on to win the title in Nigeria. Before and after that, he won caps at under-21 level.
