= Quique Hernández =

Spanish football manager (born 1958)

Personal information
- Full name: Enrique Hernández Martí
- Date of birth: 30 October 1958 (age 67)
- Place of birth: Anna, Spain

Managerial career
- Years: Team
- 1981–1982: Quart de Poblet
- 1982–1984: Alzira
- 1984–1985: Alcoyano
- 1985–1986: Gandía
- 1986–1987: Olímpic Xàtiva
- 1987: Levante
- 1988–1991: Benidorm
- 1991–1992: Castellón
- 1992–1994: Hércules
- 1994–1995: Elche
- 1995–1996: Almería
- 1996–1997: Hércules
- 1999–2000: Castellón
- 2001: Lleida
- 2002–2003: Valencian Community
- 2003–2004: Numancia
- 2004–2005: Recreativo Huelva
- 2005: Córdoba
- 2006: Valencian Community
- 2007: Aris
- 2007–2008: Albacete
- 2008–2009: Aris
- 2009–2010: Levadiakos
- 2011–2012: Huesca
- 2012–2014: Hércules

Enrique "Quique" Hernández Martí (born 30 October 1958) is a Spanish football manager.

== Football career ==
Born in Anna, Valencia, Hernández started managing in his early 20s. For the following twenty years, with the exception of the 1995–96 season with UD Almería in Segunda División, he coached exclusively in his native Valencian Community, the vast majority of the clubs being from the lower leagues.

In the 1996–97 campaign, Hernández was one of three managers for Hércules CF as they eventually suffered La Liga relegation. He also worked with four teams in the second division in the 2000s, UE Lleida, CD Numancia, Recreativo de Huelva and Albacete Balompié, being relegated with the first and promoting with the third.

From 2008 to 2010 Hernández coached in Greece, helping Aris Thessaloniki F.C. to the sixth position in the Super League Greece and suffering relegation with Levadiakos FC – he had already been briefly in charge of the former in 2006–07. In the 2011 summer, he returned to his country and signed for SD Huesca in the second level.

On 28 May 2014, after a further two seasons in the second tier with former side Hércules, where he reached the milestone of managing the club for more than 200 official matches, Hernández returned to Greece upon being appointed director of football at Veria FC.

Quique was appointed president of Hércules CF in January 2018. He led the club until the summer of 2020, when he became sporting director of CF Intercity. He led Intercity to two promotions in two seasons, reaching the Primera Federación, before resigning in June 2022.
