= Carlos Ríos =

Spanish footballer and manager

Personal information
- Full name: Juan Carlos Ríos Vidal
- Date of birth: 17 November 1964 (age 61)
- Place of birth: Sanlúcar de Barrameda, Spain
- Position: Midfielder

Senior career*
Years	Team	Apps	(Gls)
- Atlético Sanluqueño
1991–1992	Portuense	14	(0)

Managerial career
- Atlético Sanluqueño (youth)
- 2001–2002: Atlético Sanluqueño
- 2002–2003: Linense
- 2003–2005: Alcalá
- 2007–2008: Linense
- 2008: Alcalá
- 2008–2009: Almería B
- 2009–2010: Recreativo B
- 2010–2011: Recreativo
- 2011–2012: Cartagena
- 2013: Xerez
- 2013–2014: Atlético Sanluqueño
- * Club domestic league appearances and goals

Juan Carlos Ríos Vidal (born 17 November 1964) is a Spanish football manager and former player.

== Manager career ==
Born in Sanlúcar de Barrameda, Cádiz, Andalusia, Ríos began his managerial career at Atlético Sanluqueño CF's youth setup, club which he represented as a player. In the 2003 summer, after managing Sanluqueño's main squad and Real Balompédica Linense, he was appointed CD Alcalá manager, winning promotion to Segunda División B in his first campaign.

In April 2008 Ríos returned to Alcalá, after a stint at Linense. On 6 June 2008, he was appointed at the helm of Tercera División's UD Almería B, taking the club to the third level for the first time ever.

On 23 June 2009, Ríos was named manager of another reserve team, Recreativo de Huelva B also in the fourth division. In October 2010 he was appointed at the helm of the main squad in Segunda División, replacing fired Pablo Alfaro.

On 19 May 2011, Ríos signed a new deal with Recre, after avoiding relegation during the campaign. On 22 June, however, he resigned, and joined fellow league team FC Cartagena in December; he left the latter in July 2012, after suffering relegation.

On 20 February 2013, Ríos was appointed Xerez CD manager. He was relieved from his duties in June, with the club being relegated as dead last, and moved to Atlético Sanluqueño; he was sacked by the latter in January 2014.
