= Jorge D'Alessandro =

Argentine footballer and manager

Personal information
- Full name: Roberto Jorge D'Alessandro di Ninno
- Date of birth: 28 July 1949 (age 77)
- Place of birth: Buenos Aires, Argentina
- Height: 1.91 m (6 ft 3 in)
- Position: Goalkeeper

Senior career*
Years	Team	Apps	(Gls)
1968–1974	San Lorenzo	56	(0)
1974–1984	Salamanca	280	(0)
Total		336	(0)

Managerial career
- ?–1989: Salamanca (youth)
- 1989–1990: Salamanca B
- 1990–1992: Figueres
- 1992–1993: Betis
- 1994: Atlético Madrid
- 1994–1995: Atlético Madrid
- 1996: Salamanca
- 1997–1998: Mérida
- 2000: Elche
- 2000–2001: Elche
- 2002–2003: Salamanca
- 2003–2004: Rayo Vallecano
- 2010: Salamanca
- 2011–2012: Gimnàstic
- 2013: Huesca
- * Club domestic league appearances and goals

Roberto Jorge D'Alessandro di Ninno (born 28 July 1949) is an Argentine former professional football goalkeeper and manager.

He spent most of his career with Salamanca in Spain, appearing in nine La Liga seasons and more than 300 official games with the club. He subsequently embarked in a managerial career in the same country, coaching several teams.

== Playing career ==
Born in Buenos Aires, D'Alessandro spent six years in his country with San Lorenzo, being part of the squads that won four Argentine Primera División championships. In June 1974, the team played Salamanca in a friendly, and the Spaniards were so impressed they decided to purchase him, having to (successfully) deal with the Argentine Football Association first; players under 26 were prohibited from moving abroad, and he was 25.

D'Alessandro stayed in goal for the Castile and León side over ten seasons, nine of those in La Liga. In a match against Athletic Bilbao during the 1976–77 season, his collision with Dani resulted in a tear in his kidney, even though he finished the game. After having the organ removed, he resumed his football activity against all medical advice, still putting on several solid campaigns.

D'Alessandro retired in June 1984 at the age of 35 following Salamanca's relegation, having made 242 appearances in the Spanish top flight (307 in all competitions), a club record.

== Coaching career ==
D'Alessandro started coaching at his last club, being in charge of both the youth and reserve teams. His first three professional seasons were spent in the Segunda División, with Figueres (two years) and Real Betis.

In late March 1994, D'Alessandro became Atlético Madrid's sixth manager of the season, being appointed as the side, led by elusive chairman Jesús Gil, was placed in the relegation zone; the Colchoneros eventually finished in 12th position, and his contract was not renewed. He returned to Madrid for a second spell in November, taking the place of Francisco Maturana and being himself dismissed after 13 games.

D'Alessandro briefly worked with Salamanca in 1995–96, suffering top-division relegation. He then signed for Mérida of the second tier, being promoted in his first year and relegated in his second. He continued his career at that level, with three teams including another spell with his main one.

In April 2010, after several years working as a sports commentator in both radio and television, D'Alessandro returned to Salamanca for his third stint as a manager, eventually avoiding relegation from the second division. On 31 October 2011, he joined another club in the same league, Gimnàstic de Tarragona, replacing the fired Juan Carlos Oliva as they ranked last. His first match was a 5–0 home win over Catalonia neighbours Sabadell; however, after not being able to prevent the final drop even though the results improved overall, he resigned.

== Honours ==
=== Individual ===
- Ricardo Zamora Trophy: 1974–75, 1976–77

=== Manager ===
Mérida

- Segunda División: 1996–97
