= Julio Velázquez =

Spanish football manager

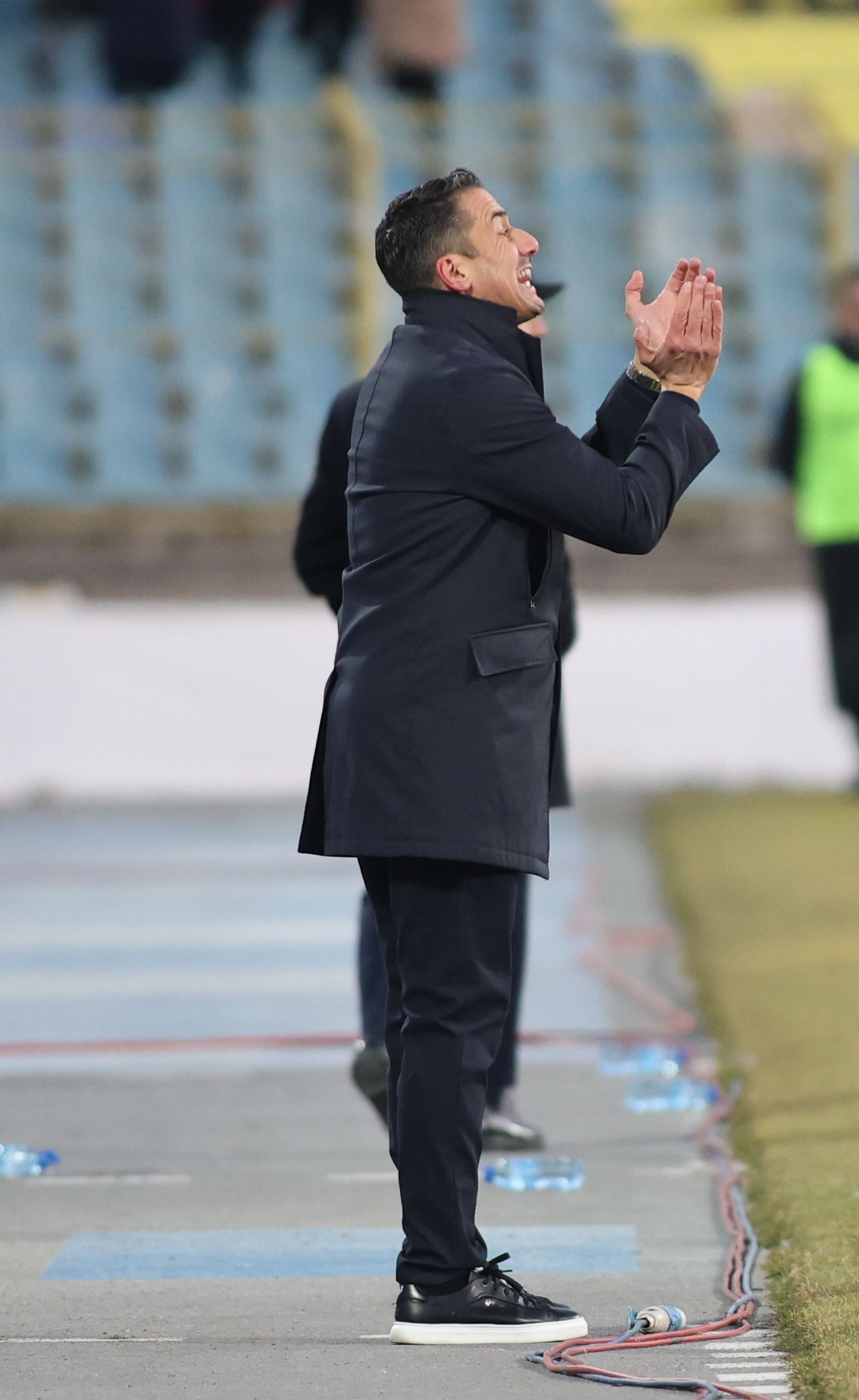
- Velázquez in 2025

Personal information
- Full name: Julio Velázquez Santiago
- Date of birth: 5 October 1981 (age 45)
- Place of birth: Salamanca, Spain
- Height: 1.87 m (6 ft 2 in)

Team information
- Current team: Levski Sofia (manager)

Managerial career
- Years: Team
- 1997–2000: San Nicolás (youth)
- 2000–2002: Sur (youth)
- 2002–2003: Betis Valladolid (youth)
- 2003–2004: Laguna (youth)
- 2004–2005: Peña Respuela
- 2006–2007: Arandina
- 2007–2008: Atlético Villacarlos
- 2008–2009: Poli Ejido (youth)
- 2009–2010: Valladolid (youth)
- 2010: Valladolid B
- 2010–2011: Poli Ejido
- 2011: Villarreal C
- 2011–2012: Villarreal B
- 2012–2013: Villarreal
- 2013–2014: Murcia
- 2014: Betis
- 2015–2016: Belenenses
- 2016–2018: Alcorcón
- 2018: Udinese
- 2019–2020: Vitória Setúbal
- 2021: Marítimo
- 2022: Alavés
- 2022–2023: Fortuna Sittard
- 2023–2024: Zaragoza
- 2025–: Levski Sofia

Julio Velázquez Santiago (born 5 October 1981) is a Spanish football manager, currently in charge of Bulgarian First League club Levski Sofia.

He began coaching at 15, and was the youngest ever Segunda División manager with Villarreal B at 30. He managed four other teams in that league, and Alavés in La Liga.

Abroad, Velázquez spent several years in Portugal's Primeira Liga with Belenenses, Vitória de Setúbal and Marítimo. He also had a brief spell in the Italian Serie A at Udinese, and the Dutch Eredivisie with Fortuna Sittard.

== Football career ==
=== Early years ===
Velázquez started training at the age of only 15, being in charge of youth teams in his hometown of Salamanca. His first job as a senior came in 2004, with AD Peña Respuela in the regional leagues.

Velázquez made his debut in the national leagues in 2010–11, being appointed at Polideportivo Ejido in the Segunda División B. He resigned in March, days after sporting director Enrique Burgos, and the Andalusians eventually finished 14th.

=== Villarreal ===
Velázquez then joined Villarreal CF's setup, first being in charge of the C side. On 24 December 2011, as José Francisco Molina left the reserves for the main squad, he was appointed his successor, thus becoming the youngest person ever to coach a club in the Segunda División, aged 30 years and two months.

On 13 June 2012, following the Yellow Submarine's top-flight relegation – which meant the B's also had to drop down a tier even though they finished in 12th position in division two – Velázquez was named first-team manager. On 13 January of the following year, following a 1–1 away draw against UD Almería, he was relieved of his duties.

=== Segunda División ===
In the following years, Velázquez continued to work in the second division, being relegated with Real Murcia CF even though the side finished in fourth position and qualified for the play-offs, and being sacked by Real Betis after only five months in charge. During roughly ten months and starting in December 2015, he was in charge of C.F. Os Belenenses in the Portuguese Primeira Liga.

Velázquez returned to his country and its second tier on 13 October 2016, signing with AD Alcorcón. He eventually managed to steer them out of the relegation zone and also ousted RCD Espanyol in the fourth round of the Copa del Rey, renewing his contract a two further years after the latter achievement.

=== Italy and Portugal ===
On 4 June 2018, after narrowly avoiding relegation, Velázquez left Alcorcón. From June–November of the same year he was in charge of Udinese Calcio of the Italian Serie A, being dismissed after only two league wins.

Velázquez returned to the Portuguese top flight in November 2019, being appointed at Vitória F.C. until the end of the season. He left by mutual consent the following 2 July, with the team three points above the relegation zone having not won any of the five games since the resumption of play following the COVID-19 break.

On 11 March 2021, Velázquez became C.S. Marítimo's third manager of the campaign at the last-placed side. His first match in charge was the following day, a 2–1 away win over C.D. Nacional in the Madeira derby.

Velázquez was relieved of his duties on 11 November 2021, with his team second-bottom after 11 rounds.

=== Alavés ===
Velázquez first reached his country's La Liga in April 2022, when he became Deportivo Alavés' third coach of the season after Javier Calleja and José Luis Mendilibar. One month later, after relegation as last, he left.

=== Fortuna Sittard ===
On 9 September 2022, Velázquez signed a one-year deal with Fortuna Sittard, bottom in the Dutch Eredivisie. He led them to their first victory of the campaign eight days later, 1–0 against Excelsior Rotterdam in spite of playing 15 minutes with one player less. He was released at the end of his contract, having finished 13th.

=== Zaragoza ===
On 20 November 2023, Velázquez replaced sacked Fran Escribá at the helm of Real Zaragoza, back in his country's second division. He was dismissed the following 11 March.

=== Levski Sofia ===
On 5 January 2025, Velázquez became head coach of PFC Levski Sofia in the Bulgarian First League on a contract until June 2026. He guided the club to win the 2025–26 national championship, bringing an end to PFC Ludogorets Razgrad's 14-year dominance.

== Managerial statistics ==
As of 22 November 2026

Managerial record by team and tenure
Team	Nat	From	To	Record							
Team	Nat	From	To	G	W	D	L	GF	GA	GD	Win %
Valladolid B	(Spain)	1 February 2010	25 May 2010	18	11	2	5	42	22	+20	61.11
Poli Ejido	(Spain)	25 May 2010	15 March 2011	33	11	9	13	36	44	−8	33.33
Villarreal C	(Spain)	1 July 2011	22 December 2011	21	9	5	7	36	31	+5	42.86
Villarreal B	(Spain)	22 December 2011	13 June 2012	24	10	4	10	28	32	−4	41.67
Villarreal	(Spain)	13 June 2012	13 January 2013	22	8	8	6	25	21	+4	36.36
Murcia	(Spain)	10 July 2013	16 June 2014	45	16	18	11	56	48	+8	35.56
Betis	(Spain)	16 June 2014	24 November 2014	16	7	4	5	22	19	+3	43.75
Belenenses	(Portugal)	17 December 2015	6 October 2016	31	10	11	10	41	47	−6	32.26
Alcorcón	(Spain)	13 October 2016	4 June 2018	82	24	28	30	71	85	−14	29.27
Udinese	(Italy)	7 June 2018	13 November 2018	13	2	3	8	12	20	−8	15.38
Vitória Setúbal	(Portugal)	11 November 2019	2 July 2020	21	4	7	10	21	38	−17	19.05
Marítimo	(Portugal)	11 March 2021	11 November 2021	25	6	7	12	20	35	−15	24.00
Alavés	(Spain)	5 April 2022	23 May 2022	8	3	0	5	7	13	−6	37.50
Fortuna Sittard	(Netherlands)	12 September 2022	28 May 2023	28	10	5	13	31	44	−13	35.71
Zaragoza	(Spain)	20 November 2023	11 March 2024	14	3	6	5	14	12	+2	21.43
Levski Sofia	(Bulgaria)	5 January 2025	Present	94	55	23	16	158	74	+84	58.51
Total				494	188	140	166	615	585	+30	38.06

== Honours ==
Levski Sofia

- Bulgarian First League: 2025–26

Individual

- Bulgarian First League Manager of the Year: 2025–26
