= César Ferrando =

Spanish footballer and manager

Personal information
- Full name: César Ferrando Jiménez
- Date of birth: 25 July 1959 (age 67)
- Place of birth: Tavernes de la Valldigna, Spain
- Height: 1.80 m (5 ft 11 in)
- Position: Midfielder

Youth career
- Tavernes

Senior career*
Years	Team	Apps	(Gls)
1977–1981	Valencia B		
1981–1984	Valencia	50	(2)
1984–1985	Salamanca	35	(4)
1985–1987	Sabadell	26	(2)
1987–1988	Olímpic Xàtiva	37	(9)
1988–1989	Alzira	33	(3)
1989–1990	Olímpic Xàtiva	35	(14)
1990–1991	Ontinyent		
Total		216	(34)

Managerial career
- ?–?: Tavernes
- 1997–2000: Gandía
- 2000–2002: Valencia B
- 2002–2004: Albacete
- 2004–2005: Atlético Madrid
- 2005–2007: Albacete
- 2008–2010: Gimnàstic
- 2012: Elche
- 2013–2014: Johor Darul Ta'zim
- 2016: Albacete
- 2018: La Nucía
- 2018–2019: Jamshedpur
- 2019–2023: La Nucía
- * Club domestic league appearances and goals

César Ferrando Jiménez (born 25 July 1959) is a Spanish former footballer who played as a midfielder, currently a manager.

== Playing career ==
Born in Tavernes de la Valldigna, Valencian Community, Ferrando started his professional career with local giants Valencia, first spending nearly four years with the reserves. He made his first-team – and La Liga – debut on 26 April 1981, playing the last minutes of the 3–1 home win against Las Palmas.

After a further three full seasons with the Che, Ferrando left in 1984 and went on to play professionally with Salamanca, Sabadell and Alzira, competing almost exclusively in the Segunda División but appearing in seven top-division games with the second club in the 1986–87 campaign. He closed out his career in 1991 at the age of 32, retiring at lowly Ontinyent in his native region.

== Managerial career ==
Ferrando started coaching at amateur level, with his local club, Tavernes. In 1997, he moved to Segunda División B, where he spent three years in charge of Gandía. In 2001, he led Valencia B to a return to the latter competition.

Ferrando was appointed at second-tier Albacete in summer 2002, achieving promotion to the top flight in his first year and leading the team to safety the following season, which prompted his signing for Atlético Madrid.

After the Colchoneros could only rank in 11th place, Ferrando was relieved of his duties in late May 2005. He subsequently returned to his previous club, for a further two second division campaigns.

For the better part of the next years, Ferrando continued to work in the second tier of Spanish football, with Gimnàstic and Elche. He moved abroad for the first time in 2013, being appointed as head coach of Malaysian club Johor Darul Ta'zim and switching to director of football afterwards.

Ferrando returned to Albacete on 13 March 2016, with the team seriously threatened with relegation from division two. On 21 July 2018, he was appointed head coach of Indian Super League franchise Jamshedpur.

== Personal life ==
Ferrando's younger brothers, Francisco (1962) and Juan Carlos (1965), were also footballers and midfielders. The former also played for Valencia.

== Managerial statistics ==
As of 25 January 2023

Managerial record by team and tenure
Team	Nat.	From	To	Record								Ref.
Team	Nat.	From	To	G	W	D	L	GF	GA	GD	Win %	Ref.
Gandía	(Spain)	1 July 1997	30 June 2000	120	48	34	38	135	113	+22	40.00	
Valencia B	(Spain)	30 June 2000	1 July 2002	88	51	20	17	171	65	+106	57.95	
Albacete	(Spain)	1 July 2002	30 June 2004	82	30	28	24	92	81	+11	36.59	
Atlético Madrid	(Spain)	30 June 2004	31 May 2005	52	22	13	17	61	43	+18	42.31	
Albacete	(Spain)	15 June 2005	30 June 2007	88	32	24	32	99	114	−15	36.36	
Gimnàstic	(Spain)	9 January 2008	6 March 2010	94	31	32	31	117	111	+6	32.98	
Elche	(Spain)	10 April 2012	12 June 2012	10	3	1	6	12	21	−9	30.00	
Johor Darul Ta'zim	(Malaysia)	21 August 2013	24 February 2014	14	7	4	3	25	13	+12	50.00	
Albacete	(Spain)	13 March 2016	6 June 2016	13	4	1	8	12	19	−7	30.77	
La Nucía	(Spain)	7 March 2018	28 May 2018	13	8	1	4	27	13	+14	61.54	
Jamshedpur	(India)	21 July 2018	7 April 2019	19	6	9	4	32	25	+7	31.58	
La Nucía	(Spain)	18 July 2019	25 January 2023	116	45	38	33	122	107	+15	38.79	
Career Total				709	287	205	217	905	725	+180	40.48	
