= 2013–14 Getafe CF season =

Getafe CF
2013–14 season
- President: Ángel Torres
- Head coach: Luis García Plaza; Cosmin Contra
- Stadium: Coliseum Alfonso Pérez
- La Liga: 13th
- Copa del Rey: Round of 16
- Top goalscorer: League: Ángel Lafita; Pedro León (7 each); All: Ángel Lafita (8 goals)
Home colours	Away colours	Third colours

The 2013–14 season was the 31st season in Getafe's history and the 10th in the top-tier.

== Squad ==
As June, 2014..

=== Squad and statistics ===
No.	Pos	Nat	Player	Total		Liga		Copa	
No.	Pos	Nat	Player	Apps	Goals	Apps	Goals	Apps	Goals
1	GK	(Spain) ESP	Miguel Ángel Moyà	26	0	26	0	0	0
2	DF	(Spain) ESP	Alexis	32	0	29	0	3	0
3	DF	(Spain) ESP	Roberto Lago	22	0	19	0	3	0
4	DF	(Argentina) ARG	Lisandro López (on loan from Benfica)	28	4	26	3	2	1
5	MF	(Algeria) ALG	Mehdi Lacen	24	0	21	0	3	0
6	FW	(Spain) ESP	Alberto Lopo (mid-season to Deportivo La Coruña)	4	0	3	0	1	0
7	MF	(Spain) ESP	Ángel Lafita	33	8	29	7	4	1
8	MF	(Spain) ESP	Pablo Sarabia	37	2	33	1	4	1
9	FW	(Romania) ROU	Ciprian Marica	29	7	27	6	2	1
9	FW	(Spain) ESP	Álvaro Vázquez (on loan at Swansea City)	1	0	1	0	0	0
10	MF	(Spain) ESP	Jaime Gavilán (captain)	23	0	20	0	3	0
11	FW	(Spain) ESP	Adrián Colunga	31	5	27	4	4	1
12	DF	(Spain) ESP	Álvaro Arroyo	17	1	17	1	0	0
13	GK	(Spain) ESP	Jordi Codina	13	0	9	0	4	0
14	MF	(Spain) ESP	Pedro León	41	7	37	7	4	0
15	DF	(Spain) ESP	Rafa	32	0	29	0	3	0
16	FW	(France) FRA	Bertrand Fontaine	42	1	38	1	4	0
17	MF	(Spain) ESP	Diego Castro	35	1	32	1	3	0
18	DF	(Spain) ESP	Sergio Escudero	20	2	19	2	1	0
19	FW	(Venezuela) VEN	Miku (mid-season to Al-Gharafa)	5	2	5	2	0	0
19	MF	(Croatia) CRO	Sammir (mid-season from Dinamo Zagreb)	8	0	8	0	0	0
20	DF	(Spain) ESP	Juan Valera	25	0	22	0	3	0
21	MF	(Spain) ESP	Míchel	17	0	15	0	2	0
22	MF	(Spain) ESP	Juan Rodríguez	18	0	15	0	3	0
23	MF	(Spain) ESP	Borja Fernández	29	0	28	0	1	0
24	MF	(Spain) ESP	Pedro Mosquera	26	0	25	0	1	0
25	GK	(Brazil) BRA	Júlio César (mid-season from Benfica)	5	0	5	0	0	0
28	DF	(Spain) ESP	Carlos Vigaray (reserve team)	2	0	1	0	1	0
30	FW	(Spain) ESP	Ivi (reserve team)	1	0	1	0	0	0

== Competitions ==
=== Overall ===
Competition	Started round	Current position / round	Final position / round	First match	Last match
La Liga	—	—			
Copa del Rey	Round of 32	—			

Source: Competitions
