= 2011–12 Getafe CF season =

Getafe CF
2011–12 season
- President: Ángel Torres Sánchez
- Head coach: Luis García
- Stadium: Coliseum Alfonso Pérez
- La Liga: 11th
- Copa del Rey: Round of 32
- Top goalscorer: League: Miku (12 goals); All: Miku (12 goals)

The 2011–12 season will be the 29th season in Getafe CF's history and their eighth consecutive season in La Liga, the top division of Spanish football. It covers a period from 1 July 2011 to 30 June 2012.

Getafe will compete for their first La Liga title after a 16th-place finish in the 2010–11 La Liga. They will also enter the Copa del Rey in the Round of 32.

== Players ==
=== Squad information ===
As of 24 June 2011

Note: Flags indicate national team as defined under FIFA eligibility rules; some limited exceptions apply. Players may hold more than one non-FIFA nationality.

No.	Pos.	Nation	Player
1	GK	ARG	Oscar Ustari
2	DF	ARG	Cata Díaz
3	DF	ESP	Mané
4	DF	TUR	İbrahim Kaş
5	DF	ITA	Michelangelo Albertazzi (on loan from Milan)
6	MF	ESP	Borja
7	FW	VEN	Miku
8	MF	ESP	Jaime Gavilán
9	FW	ESP	Adrián Colunga
13	GK	ESP	Jordi Codina
14	FW	FRA	Bertrand Fontaine
15	DF	ESP	Rafa

No.	Pos.	Nation	Player
16	MF	ESP	Pedro Ríos
17	MF	ESP	Diego Castro
18	MF	ALG	Mehdi Lacen
19	FW	ESP	Javier Arizmendi
20	DF	ESP	Alberto Lopo
21	MF	ESP	Pedro Mosquera
22	MF	ESP	Javier Casquero (captain)
23	GK	ESP	Miguel Ángel Moyà (on loan from Valencia)
24	DF	ESP	Miguel Torres
25	MF	ESP	Juan Rodríguez
26	MF	ESP	Pablo Sarabia

=== Transfers ===
==== In ====
No.	Pos.	Nat.	Name	Age	EU	Moving from	Type	Transfer window	Ends	Transfer fee	Source
	LW	(Spain)	Castro	28	EU	Sporting Gijón	Transfer	Summer	2015	Free	Marca.com
	DM	(Algeria)	Lacen	27	EU	Racing Santander	Transfer	Summer	2015	Free	Mercafutbol.com
	DM	(Spain)	Rodríguez	29	EU	Deportivo La Coruña	Transfer	Summer	2015	Free	Marca.com
25	GK	(Spain)	Moyà	27	EU	Valencia	Loan	Summer	2012	N/A	Nostresport.com
	CB	(Spain)	Lopo	31	EU	Deportivo La Coruña	Transfer	Summer	2014	Free	AS.com
	CB	(Italy)	Albertazzi	19	EU	Milan (Italy)	Loan	Summer	2012	N/A	AS.com
8	AM	(Spain)	Sarabia	19	EU	Real Madrid Castilla	Transfer	Summer	2016	€3M	AS.com
19	ST	(Spain)	Güiza	19	EU	Fenerbahçe (Turkey)	Transfer	Summer	2016	€3M	AS.com

Total expenditure: ▼€3 million

==== Out ====
No.	Pos.	Nat.	Name	Age	EU	Moving to	Type	Transfer window	Transfer fee	Source
18	CM	(Ghana)	Boateng	28	Non-EU	Dnipro (Ukraine)	Transfer	Summer	€6M	AS.com
	MF	(Spain)	Pallardó	24	EU	Levante	Transfer	Summer	€0.2M	AS.com
10	SS	(Uruguay)	Albín	24	Non-EU	Espanyol	Transfer	Summer	€3M	Esfutbol.net
5	CB	(Spain)	Mario	29	EU	Betis	Transfer	Summer	Free	Marca.com
14	FW	(Spain)	Manu	27	EU	Sevilla	Transfer	Summer	€4.5M	Esfutbol.net
11	CM	(Spain)	Parejo	22	EU	Valencia	Transfer	Summer	€5M	AS.com
23	CB	(Spain)	Marcano	23	EU	Villarreal	Loan return	Summer	N/A	AS.com

Total income: ▲€18.7 million

== Club ==
=== Coaching staff ===
Position	Staff
Head coach	Luis García
2nd coach	Pedro Rostoll
Physical trainer	José Romero
Physiotherapists	Álvaro García, Carlos Enrique López, Pedro Rodríguez
Team delegate	Enrique Basauri
Doctors	Ana de la Torre, Alberto Cerqueira, Christopher Oyola
Goalkeepers coach	Juan Miguel Sanromán
Kit managers	Javier Cabeza, Francisco Gutiérrez Pinilla, Iván García
Delegate	Jesús Mantilla
Recuperator	Sergio Jiménez

Source: Getafecf.com

=== Pre-season ===
==== Friendly matches ====
14 July 2011	Toledo (Spain)	1 – 2	Getafe	Toledo
21:00 CEST	68' Martín		22' Mané; 29' Ríos	Stadium: Salto del Caballo del Toledo

23 July 2011	Oud-Heverlee Leuven (Belgium)	0 – 4	Getafe	Den Dreef, Heverlee
18:00 CEST		(Report)	Castro 9'; Pérez 22'; Mosquera 82'; Sánchez 84'

24 July 2011	Gent (Belgium)	1 – 1	Getafe	Jules Ottenstadion, Ghent
15:00 CEST	Smolders 49'	(Report)	Lopo 30'

27 July 2011	Kayserispor (Turkey)	3 – 0	Getafe

29 July 2011	Antwerp (Belgium)	3 – 1	Getafe

30 July 2011	VVV (Netherlands)	2 – 0	Getafe

=== La Liga ===
==== League table ====
Pos	Team	Pld	W	D	L	GF	GA	GD	Pts	Qualification or relegation
9	Sevilla	38	13	11	14	48	47	+1	50	
10	Athletic Bilbao	38	12	13	13	49	52	−3	49	Qualification for the Europa League third qualifying round (Note: Athletic Bilbao qualified for the third qualifying round of the 2012–13 UEFA Europa League as runners-up of the 2011–12 Copa del Rey to Barcelona, who have qualified for the 2012–13 UEFA Champions League. Consequently, Levante entered the play-off round.)
11	Getafe	38	12	11	15	40	51	−11	47 (Note: GET: 8 pts; RSO: 5 pts; BET: 2 pts)	
12	Real Sociedad	38	12	11	15	46	52	−6	47	
13	Real Betis	38	13	8	17	47	56	−9	47	

Source: ESPN
Rules for classification: 1st points; 2nd head-to-head points; 3rd head-to-head goal difference; 4th head-to-head goals scored; 5th goal difference; 6th number of goals scored; 7th Fair-play points

==== Results summary ====
Overall								Home						Away					
Pld	W	D	L	GF	GA	GD	Pts	W	D	L	GF	GA	GD	W	D	L	GF	GA	GD
38	12	10	16	39	51	−12	46	8	5	5	23	18	+5	4	5	11	16	33	−17

Last updated: 13 May 2012.
Source: Competitive matches

==== Results by round ====
Round	1	2	3	4	5	6	7	8	9	10	11	12	13	14	15	16	17	18	19	20	21	22	23	24	25	26	27	28	29	30	31	32	33	34	35	36	37	38
Ground	H	A	H	A	H	A	H	A	H	A	H	A	H	A	H	A	H	A	A	A	H	A	H	A	H	A	H	A	H	A	H	A	H	A	H	H	A	H
Result	D	L	L	L	W	L	D	D	D	L	W	L	W	L	W	W	D	D	W	W	L	L	D	D	L	W	W	D	W	L	W	L	W	L	L	D	D	L
Position	9	16	17	19	16	17	17	17	16	20	14	15	13	16	13	12	11	11	11	11	11	11	11	11	11	11	11	11	11	11	11	11	11	11	11	11	11	13

Updated to match(es) played on 13 May 2012. Source: La Liga
A = Away; H = Home; W = Win; D = Draw; L = Loss

==== Matches ====
28 August 2011 1	Getafe	1–1	Levante	Getafe
18:00 CET	Rodríguez (yellow card) 39'; Lopo (yellow card) 45'; Miku 62'; Torres (yellow card) 68'; Lacen (yellow card) 86'; Sarabia (yellow card) 90'	Summary	Suárez (yellow card) 44'; Juanfran (yellow card) 45'; Juanlu 77'; Barkero (yellow card) 90+2'	Stadium: Coliseum Alfonso Pérez; Attendance: 9,000; Referee: Ignacio Iglesias

10 September 2011 2	Real Madrid	4–2	Getafe	Madrid
20:00 CET	Benzema 14', 69'; Ronaldo (yellow card) 21', (goal) 60' (pen.); Carvalho (yellow card) 69'; Alonso (yellow card) 83'; Higuaín 88'	Summary	Valera (yellow card) 22'; Miku 39', 74'; Casquero (yellow card) 45'; Torres (yellow card) 84'	Stadium: Santiago Bernabéu; Attendance: 75,000; Referee: Carlos Clos Gómez

18 September 2011 3	Getafe	0–1	Rayo Vallecano	Getafe
12:00 CET	Masilela (yellow card) 13'; Pérez (yellow card) 54'; Ríos (yellow card) 90'	Summary	Michu 4', (yellow card) 81'; Arribas (yellow card) 46'; Casado (yellow card) 65'; Tito (yellow card) 78'	Stadium: Coliseum Alfonso Pérez; Attendance: 10,000; Referee: Pedro Jesús Pérez Montero

22 September 2011 4	Espanyol	1–0	Getafe	Barcelona
20:00 CET	Moreno (yellow card) 18'; Bifouma (yellow card) 36'; Weiss (yellow card) 76'; Pandiani 90+2', (yellow card) 90+2'; García (yellow card) 90+3'	Summary	Pérez (yellow card) 40'	Stadium: Cornellà-El Prat; Attendance: 16,000; Referee: Alberto Undiano Mallenco

26 September 2011 5	Getafe	1–0	Real Betis	Getafe
21:00 CET	Lopo (yellow card) 30'; Castro 31', (yellow card) 83'; Pedro León (yellow card) 41'; Mané (yellow card) 58'; Valera (yellow card) 88'	Summary	Mario (yellow card) 9'; Iriney (yellow card) 45'; Molina (yellow card)	Stadium: Coliseum Alfonso Pérez; Attendance: 12,000; Referee: Javier Turienzo Álvarez

1 October 2011 6	Málaga	3–2	Getafe	Málaga
22:00 CET	Baptista (yellow card) 18', (goal) 90+2'; Van Nistelrooy 64'; Eliseu (yellow card) 77'; Maresca 88'	Summary	Pedro León (yellow card) 28', (goal) 55'; Lopo (yellow card) 40'; Güiza (yellow card) 40'; Lacen (yellow card) 41' (yellow-red card) 76'; Barrada (yellow card) 67'; Miku 75'; Rodríguez (yellow card) 89'; Ríos (yellow card) 90+4'	Stadium: La Rosaleda; Attendance: 25,000; Referee: Alfonso Alvarez Izquierdo

15 October 2011 7	Getafe	0–0	Villarreal	Getafe
18:00 CET	Sarabia (yellow card) 35'; Valera (yellow card) 48'; Pérez (yellow card) 62'; Míchel (yellow card) 78'	Summary	Rodríguez (yellow card) 15'; Valero (yellow card) 57'; Catalá (yellow card) 59'; Rossi (yellow card) 71'; Marchena (yellow card) 76'	Stadium: Coliseum Alfonso Pérez; Attendance: 13,000; Referee: José Antonio Teixeira Vitienes

23 October 2011 8	Real Sociedad	0–0	Getafe	San Sebastián
16:00 CET	Ifrán (yellow card) 17'; Zurutuza (yellow card) 84'	Summary	Torres (yellow card) 60'	Stadium: Anoeta; Attendance: 25,000; Referee: Xavier Estrada Fernández

26 October 2011 9	Getafe	2–2	Osasuna	Getafe
20:00 CET	Pérez (yellow card) 60'; Güiza 62', 77'; Torres (yellow card) 88'	Summary	Baldé 7', 66'; Damià (yellow card) 54'; Nekounam (yellow card) 59'; Fernández (yellow card) 90+2'	Stadium: Coliseum Alfonso Pérez; Attendance: 7,000; Referee: José Luis Paradas Romero

29 October 2011 10	Valencia	3–1	Getafe	Valencia
18:00 CET	Feghouli 12', 25', (yellow card) 47'; Albelda (yellow card) 50'; Aduriz 76'	Summary	Castro 23', (yellow card) 65'; Pérez (yellow card) 45+1'	Stadium: Mestalla; Attendance: 28,000; Referee: David Fernández Borbalán

6 November 2011 11	Getafe	3–2	Atlético Madrid	Getafe
22:00 CET	Lacen (yellow card) 11'; Míchel (yellow card) 13', (goal) 49'; Lopo (red card) 29'; Ríos (yellow card) 31'; Güiza (yellow card) 32'; Barrada 40'; Castro (yellow card) 65', (goal) 83' (pen.)	Summary	Filipe Luís (yellow card) 8'; López (yellow card) 18'; Falcao 30' (pen.); Tiago (yellow card) 39'; Salvio (yellow card) 71'; Domínguez 80', (yellow card) 90+4'; Turan (yellow card) 82'	Stadium: Coliseum Alfonso Pérez; Attendance: 8,000; Referee: Miguel Pérez Lasa

20 November 2011 12	Sporting de Gijón	2–1	Getafe	Gijón
16:00 CET	Barral (yellow card) 41'; Cases (yellow card) 42'; Trejo 45+5'; Novo 89', (yellow card) 90'	Summary	Valera (yellow card) 26'; Mané (yellow card) 33'; Miku 35'; Torres (yellow card) 40'; Barrada (yellow card) 59' (yellow-red card) 61'; Sarabia (yellow card) 66'; Díaz (yellow card) 90'; Rodríguez (yellow card) 90+1'; Güiza (yellow card) 90+2'; Rafa (yellow card) 90+2'; Míchel (yellow card) 90+4'	Stadium: El Molinón; Attendance: 20,000; Referee: Javier Turienzo Álvarez

26 November 2011 13	Getafe	1–0	Barcelona	Getafe
22:00 CET	Lacen (yellow card) 24'; Casquero (yellow card) 47'; Valera 67'; Castro (yellow card) 71'; Lopo (yellow card) 78'	Summary	Piqué (yellow card) 44'; Busquets (yellow card) 89'	Stadium: Coliseum Alfonso Pérez; Attendance: 10,000; Referee: Fernando Teixeira Vitienes

5 December 2011 14	Sevilla	3–0	Getafe	Seville
21:00 CET	Fazio 33'; Manu 50'; Navarro (yellow card) 69'; Medel (yellow card) 74'; Kanouté 90+2'	Summary	Rafa (yellow card) 24'; Míchel (yellow card) 64'; Ríos (yellow card) 79'; Torres (yellow card) 88'	Stadium: Ramón Sánchez Pizjuán; Attendance: 38,000; Referee: Ignacio Iglesias

11 December 2011 15	Getafe	1–0	Granada	Getafe
16:00 CET	Castro (yellow card) 34'; Míchel (yellow card) 58'; Valera (yellow card) 75'; Casquero 78', (yellow card) 80'	Summary	Siqueira (yellow card) 67'; Ighalo (yellow card) 75'	Stadium: Coliseum Alfonso Pérez; Attendance: 10,000; Referee: José Luis González González

17 December 2011 16	Mallorca	1–2	Getafe	Palma
18:00 CET	Ramis 10'; Pina (yellow card) 19'; Cáceres (yellow card) 21'; Flores (yellow card) 55'; Pereira (yellow card) 58'; Cendrós (yellow card) 79'	Summary	Barrada 28', 44'; Lopo (yellow card) 31'; Masilela (yellow card) 81'; Moyà (yellow card) 83'; Torres (yellow card) 87'	Stadium: Iberostar; Attendance: 11,000; Referee: Eduardo Iturralde González

8 January 2012 17	Getafe	0–0	Athletic Bilbao	Getafe
16:00 CET	Güiza (yellow card) 28'; Rafa (yellow card) 55'; Míchel (yellow card) 58'	Summary	Aurtenetxe (yellow card) 69'	Stadium: Coliseum Alfonso Pérez; Attendance: 10,000; Referee: Alfonso Alvarez Izquierdo

14 January 2012 18	Real Zaragoza	1–1	Getafe	Zaragoza
18:00 CET	Paredes (yellow card) 34'; Lanzaro 39'; García (yellow card) 58'; Rúben Micael (yellow card) 76'	Summary	Masilela (yellow card) 25'; Paredes 79' (o.g.); Pedro León (yellow card) 80'	Stadium: La Romareda; Attendance: 28,000; Referee: Antonio Mateu Lahoz

21 January 2012 19	Racing Santander	1–2	Getafe	Santander
18:00 CET	Stuani 13'; Torrejón (yellow card) 61'	Summary	Gavilán 26'; Miku 83'; Míchel (yellow card) 88'; Pedro León (yellow card) 90+2'	Stadium: El Sardinero; Attendance: 14,000; Referee: José Luis González González

29 January 2012 20	Levante	1–2	Getafe	Valencia
16:00 CET	Del Horno (yellow card) 86'; Suárez 90+1' (pen.)	Summary	Barrada (yellow card) 31'; Güiza 32', (yellow card) 52'; Mesilela (yellow card) 61'; Castro 82'; Lopo (red card) 90'	Stadium: Ciutat de València; Attendance: 9,757; Referee: Fernando Teixeira Vitienes

4 February 2012 21	Getafe	0–1	Real Madrid	Getafe
20:00 CET	Rodríguez (yellow card) 28'; Díaz (yellow card) 33'; Casquero (yellow card) 35'; Miku (yellow card) 36'; Arizmendi (yellow card) 82'; Masilela (yellow card) 87'	Summary	Ramos 18'	Stadium: Coliseum Alfonso Pérez; Attendance: 14,000; Referee: Miguel Ángel Ayza Gámez

12 February 2012 22	Rayo Vallecano	2–0	Getafe	Madrid
16:00 CET	Michu (yellow card) 7', (goal) 34'; Pulido (yellow card) 21'; Costa (yellow card) 27', (goal) 64'; Arribas (yellow card) 86'; Casado (yellow card) 87'	Summary	Lopo (yellow card) 28'; Mané (yellow card) 36'; Güiza (yellow card) 49'; Míchel (red card) 61'	Stadium: Vallecas; Attendance: 10,000; Referee: Alfonso Alvarez Izquierdo

18 February 2012 23	Getafe	1–1	Espanyol	Getafe
18:00 CET	Barrada (yellow card) 3'; Díaz (yellow card) 34'; Miku 70' (pen.)	Summary	Weiss (yellow card) 55'; Vázquez 66'; Bifouma (yellow card) 70'; Galán (yellow card) 71' (yellow-red card) 81'; Romaric (yellow card) 73'	Stadium: Coliseum Alfonso Pérez; Attendance: 9,000; Referee: Antonio Mateu Lahoz

25 February 2012 24	Real Betis	1–1	Getafe	Seville
18:00 CET	Juanma (yellow card) 37'; Molina 51'; Santa Cruz (yellow card) 67'	Summary	Casquero (yellow card) 14'; Barrada (yellow card) 21'; Dorado 55' (o.g.); Valera (yellow card) 58'; Güiza (yellow card) 74'; Miku (yellow card) 76'; Díaz (yellow card) 86'	Stadium: Benito Villamarín; Attendance: 42,160; Referee: César Muñiz Fernández

3 March 2012 25	Getafe	1–3	Málaga	Getafe
18:00 CET	Valera (yellow card) 32'; Castro 42'; Lacen (yellow card) 53'; Mané (yellow card) 77'	Summary	Isco (yellow card) 13'; Recio (yellow card) 44'; Eliseu 57'; Toulalan 82'; Rondón (yellow card) 85'; Mathijsen (yellow card) 89'; Cazorla 90+2'	Stadium: Coliseum Alfonso Pérez; Attendance: 8,000; Referee: Alberto Undiano Mallenco

12 March 2012 26	Villarreal	1–2	Getafe	Villarreal
21:00 CET	Rodríguez (yellow card) 26'; Nilmar 45' (pen.); Bruno (yellow card) 54'	Summary	Castro 6'; Míchel (yellow card) 17'; Alexis (yellow card) 28'; Díaz (yellow card) 45'; Barrada 72'	Stadium: El Madrigal; Attendance: 18,000; Referee: Pedro Jesús Pérez Montero

17 March 2012 27	Getafe	1–0	Real Sociedad	Getafe
18:00 CET	Rafa (yellow card) 34'; Míchel (yellow card) 45'; Valera (yellow card) 80'; I. Martínez 81' (o.g.); Castro (yellow card) 90'	Summary	Bergara (yellow card) 11'; Griezmann (yellow card) 54'; Demidov (yellow card) 90'; Cadamuro-Bentaïba (yellow card) 90+2'	Stadium: Coliseum Alfonso Pérez; Attendance: 11,000; Referee: David Fernández Borbalán

20 March 2012 28	Osasuna	0–0	Getafe	Pamplona
20:00 CET	Nekounam (yellow card) 63'; Cejudo (yellow card) 90'	Summary		Stadium: El Sadar; Attendance: 14,084; Referee: Miguel Pérez Lasa

24 March 2012 29	Getafe	3–1	Valencia	Getafe
22:00 CET	Ríos 12', (yellow card) 83'; Miku 24', (yellow card) 72'; Bruno 30' (o.g.); Míchel (yellow card) 81'	Summary	Soldado 5', (yellow card) 45'; Bruno (yellow card) 27'; Alba (yellow card) 46'; Piatti (yellow card) 51'; Parejo (yellow card) 88'; Ruiz (yellow card) 90+2'	Stadium: Coliseum Alfonso Pérez; Attendance: 9,000; Referee: Xavier Estrada Fernández

1 April 2012 30	Atlético Madrid	3–0	Getafe	Madrid
12:00 CET	Salvio 24'; Diego 62'; Falcao 77'; Koke (yellow card) 89'	Summary	Alexis (yellow card) 53'; Díaz (yellow card) 70'	Stadium: Vicente Calderón; Attendance: 49,000; Referee: José Luis Paradas Romero

7 April 2012 31	Getafe	2–0	Sporting de Gijón	Getafe
18:00 CET	Miku 22'; Valera (yellow card) 31'; Díaz (yellow card) 38'; Castro 47'; Míchel (yellow card) 65'; Mané (yellow card) 89'	Summary	Botía (yellow card) 21'; Ayoze (yellow card) 54'; Hernández (yellow card) 60'; Carmelo (yellow card) 84'	Stadium: Coliseum Alfonso Pérez; Attendance: 8,000; Referee: Fernando Teixeira Vitienes

10 April 2012 32	Barcelona	4–0	Getafe	Barcelona
21:00 CET	Sánchez 13', 73'; Messi 44', (yellow card) 50'; Pedro 74'	Summary	Gavilán (yellow card) 74'	Stadium: Camp Nou; Attendance: 76,041; Referee: José Luis González González

16 April 2012 33	Getafe	5–1	Sevilla	Getafe
21:00 CET	Torres 35', (yellow card) 37'; Lacen 49'; Miku 63', 71'; Ríos 68'; Casquero (yellow card) 86'	Summary	Negredo 19'; Trochowski (yellow card) 43'; Navarro (yellow card) 50'	Stadium: Coliseum Alfonso Pérez; Attendance: 7,000; Referee: Javier Turienzo Álvarez

22 April 2012 34	Granada	1–0	Getafe	Granada
12:00 CET	Gómez (yellow card) 6'; Jara 18'; Benítez (yellow card) 31'	Summary	Ríos (yellow card) 36'; Güiza (yellow card) 90+2'	Stadium: Los Cármenes; Attendance: 21,000; Referee: Miguel Ángel Ayza Gámez

28 April 2012 35	Getafe	1–3	Mallorca	Getafe
18:00 CET	Miku (yellow card) 61'; Díaz (yellow card) 75'; Moyà (yellow card) 79'; Casquero (yellow card) 80'; Alexis 90+2'	Summary	Víctor 30', (yellow card) 61'; Alfaro (yellow card) 44', (goal) 68'; Ramis (yellow card) 56'; Hemed 78'	Stadium: Coliseum Alfonso Pérez; Attendance: 5,000; Referee: José Luis Paradas Romero

1 May 2012 36	Getafe	1–1	Racing de Santander	Getafe
12:00 CET	Díaz (yellow card) 13'; Miku 59' (pen.); Rafa (yellow card) 86'; Valera (yellow card) 89'; Alexis (yellow card) 90+1'	Summary	Christian (yellow card) 43'; Samperio (yellow card) 50'; Diop 64'; Álvaro (yellow card) 82'	Stadium: Coliseum Alfonso Pérez; Attendance: 6,000; Referee: Alberto Undiano Mallenco

5 May 2012 37	Athletic Bilbao	0–0	Getafe	Bilbao
21:00 CET	Ekiza (yellow card) 21'	Summary	Casquero (yellow card) 17'; Rodríguez (yellow card) 40'; Díaz (yellow card) 62'	Stadium: San Mamés; Attendance: 32,000; Referee: José Luis González González

13 May 2012 38	Getafe	0–2	Real Zaragoza	Getafe
20:00 CET	Torres (yellow card) 14' (yellow-red card) 57'; Sarabia (yellow card) 25' (yellow-red card) 25'; Valera (yellow card) 36'; Lacen (yellow card) 76'; Miku (red card) 87'	Summary	Paredes (yellow card) 6'; Apoño 58' (pen.); Rúben Micael (yellow card) 81'; Dujmović (red card) 83'; Postiga 90+1', (yellow card) 90+2'	Stadium: Coliseum Alfonso Pérez; Referee: José Antonio Teixeira Vitienes

=== Last 32 ===
13 December 2011 First Leg	Getafe	0–1	Málaga	Getafe
21:00 CET (UTC+01)	Ríos (yellow card) 60'; Güiza (yellow card) 90'	Summary	Apoño (yellow card) 14'; Gámez (yellow card) 73'; Toulalan (yellow card) 73'; Juanmi 84'	Stadium: Coliseum Alfonso Pérez; Attendance: 5,000; Referee: Alberto Undiano Mallenco

21 December 2011 Second Leg	Málaga	2–2 (3–2 agg.)	Getafe	Málaga
21:00 CET (UTC+01)	Van Nistelrooy 45'; Weligton (red card) 77'; Buonanotte 86', (yellow card) 90'	Summary	Mané (yellow card) 11', (goal) 79'; Lacen (yellow card) 22'; Caballero 51' (o.g.); Lopo (yellow card) 60'; Casquero (red card) 81'; Pérez (yellow card) 85'; Güiza (yellow card) 87'; Míchel (yellow card) 87'; Díaz (yellow card) 90'	Stadium: La Rosaleda; Attendance: 6,000; Referee: Carlos Clos Gómez

== See also ==
- 2011–12 Copa del Rey
- 2011–12 La Liga
