= 2012–13 Getafe CF season =

Getafe CF
2012–13 season
- La Liga: 10th
- Copa del Rey: Round of 16
- Top goalscorer: League: Diego Castro (7 goals); All: Diego Castro (7 goals)

The 2012–13 Getafe CF season was the club's 30th season in its history and its ninth in La Liga.

== Competitions ==
=== Overview ===
| Competition | Started round | Final position / round | First match | Last match |
|---|---|---|---|---|
| La Liga | — | 10th | 18 August 2012 | 1 June 2013 |
| Copa del Rey | Round of 32 | Round of 16 | 1 November 2012 | 10 January 2013 |

Updated to match played 1 June 2013
Source: Competitions

=== La Liga ===
Win Draw Loss Postponed

| 18 August 2012 1 | Sevilla | 2–1 | Getafe | Seville |
| 21:00 CEST | Fazio 34'; Negredo 38' (pen.); Rakitić (yellow card) 45+2'; Spahić (yellow card) 54'; Medel (yellow card) 54'; Manu (yellow card) 78' | Summary | Valera (yellow card) 36'; Alexis (yellow card) 42', (goal) 50'; Pedro León (yellow card) 49'; M. Torres (yellow card) 57' | Stadium: Ramón Sánchez Pizjuán Stadium; Attendance: 36,000; Referee: Alfonso Álvarez Izquierdo |

| 26 August 2012 2 | Getafe | 2–1 | Real Madrid | Getafe, Madrid |
| 21:00 CEST | Valera (yellow card) 44', (goal) 53'; Míchel (yellow card) 54'; Barrada 75'; X. Torres (yellow card) 89' | Summary | Higuaín 27'; Albiol (yellow card) 76'; Coentrão (red card) 90+3' | Stadium: Coliseum Alfonso Pérez; Attendance: 13,000; Referee: Miguel Pérez Lasa |

| 1 September 2012 3 | Deportivo La Coruña | 1–1 | Getafe | A Coruña |
| 20:00 CEST | Riki 6'; Aythami (yellow card) 47'; Aguilar (yellow card) 53' | Summary | Barrada 26'; Míchel (yellow card) 42'; Alexis (yellow card) 55' | Stadium: Riazor; Attendance: 30,000; Referee: Antonio Mateu Lahoz |

| 15 September 2012 4 | Getafe | 1–4 | Barcelona | Getafe |
| 20:00 CEST | Míchel (yellow card) 61'; Valera (yellow card) 62'; Sarabia 80' | Summary | Busquets (yellow card) 23'; Adriano 32'; Piqué (yellow card) 38'; Messi 74' (pen.), 78'; Villa 90+1' | Stadium: Coliseum Alfonso Pérez; Attendance: 13,000; Referee: Fernando Teixeira Vitienes |

| 22 September 2012 5 | Celta Vigo | 2–1 | Getafe | Vigo |
| 18:00 CEST | Lago (yellow card) 13'; Fernández 57'; Park 69', (yellow card) 89'; Krohn-Dehli (yellow card) 90'; Cabral (yellow card) 90+5' | Summary | Lopo (yellow card) 33'; Míchel (yellow card) 40'; Alexis (yellow card) 42' (red card) 90+4'; Barrada 59' | Stadium: Balaídos; Attendance: 17,315; Referee: José Antonio Teixeira Vitienes |

| 1 October 2012 6 | Getafe | 1–0 | Mallorca | Getafe |
| 21:30 CEST | Castro 49', (yellow card) 50'; Pedro León (yellow card) 79' | Summary | João Victor (yellow card) 7'; Navarro (red card) 11'; Víctor (yellow card) 11'; Geromel (yellow card) 73' | Stadium: Coliseum Alfonso Pérez; Attendance: 10,000; Referee: José Paradas Romero |

| 6 October 2012 7 | Real Zaragoza | 0–1 | Getafe | Zaragoza |
| 18:00 CEST | Romaric (red card) 9'; Săpunaru (yellow card) 21'; José Mari (yellow card) 48'; Postiga (yellow card) 50'; Roberto (yellow card) 63'; Álvaro (red card) 63'; Abraham (yellow card) 90' | Summary | Abraham (yellow card) 22'; X. Torres (yellow card) 32'; Castro 64' (pen.); Barrada (red card) 84' | Stadium: La Romareda; Attendance: 18,000; Referee: César Muñiz Fernández |

| 21 October 2012 8 | Getafe | 0–1 | Levante | Getafe |
| 12:00 CEST | Rafa (yellow card) 22'; Lafita (yellow card) 45' | Summary | Juanlu (yellow card) 39'; Juanfran (yellow card) 66'; Ballesteros (yellow card) 83'; Míchel 87' | Stadium: Coliseum Alfonso Pérez; Attendance: 9,500; Referee: Pedro Pérez Montero |

| 28 October 2012 9 | Athletic Bilbao | 1–2 | Getafe | Bilbao |
| 17:50 | Muniain (yellow card) 22'; De Marcos (yellow card) 36'; Aurtenetxe (yellow card) 50'; Aduriz (yellow card) 71'; Susaeta (yellow card) 86'; San José 90' | Summary | Rodríguez 12'; Valera (yellow card) 53'; Vázquez 58'; Colunga (yellow card) 83' | Stadium: San Mamés; Attendance: 33,000; Referee: Jesús Gil Manzano |

| 5 November 2012 10 | Getafe | 2–4 | Real Betis | Getafe |
| 21:30 | Rafa (yellow card) 20'; Pedro León 38'; D. Castro 20'; Barrada (yellow card) 73' | | Beñat (yellow card) 38', (goal) 74'; Molina 59'; R. Castro 76', (yellow card) 90'; Cañas (yellow card) 81'; Sevilla 90'; Adrián (yellow card) 90' | Stadium: Coliseum Alfonso Pérez; Referee: Miguel Ayza Gámez |

| 11 November 2012 11 | Atlético Madrid | 2–0 | Getafe | Madrid |
| | Adrián 24'; Turan 43'; Gabi (yellow card) 60'; Suárez (yellow card) 89' | | Rodríguez (yellow card) 19'; Alexis (yellow card) 28'; Castro (yellow card) 39'; X. Torres (yellow card) 43'; Vázquez (yellow card) 43' | Stadium: Vicente Calderón; Attendance: 45,000; Referee: José Paradas Romero |

| 18 November 2012 12 | Getafe | 2–0 | Real Valladolid | Getafe |
| | Gavilán (yellow card) 12'; Lopo (yellow card) 36'; Alexis 74'; Lafita 78' | | Óscar 45' | Stadium: Coliseum Alfonso Pérez; Attendance: 7,000; Referee: Carlos Clos Gómez |

| 25 November 2012 13 | Espanyol | 0–2 | Getafe | Cornellà de Llobregat |
| | Forlín (yellow card) 50'; López (yellow card) 72' | | Pedro León 17', (yellow card) 64'; Míchel (yellow card) 64'; Mané 90+1' | Stadium: Cornellà-El Prat; Attendance: 19,053; Referee: Alejandro Hernández Hernández |

| 1 December 2012 14 | Getafe | 1–0 | Málaga | Getafe |
| | Lopo 57'; Castro (yellow card) 80' (yellow-red card) 90+3'; Lafita (yellow card) 85' | | Camacho (yellow card) 32'; Eliseu (yellow card) 54'; Toulalan (yellow card) 76' | Stadium: Coliseum Alfonso Pérez; Attendance: 12,000; Referee: José González González |

| 8 December 2012 15 | Real Sociedad | 1–1 | Getafe | San Sebastián |
| | Pardo (yellow card) 61'; González (yellow card) 63'; C. Martínez 90+1' | | Lopo (yellow card) 29'; Barrada (yellow card) 45+1'; Mané (yellow card) 60'; Alexis (yellow card) 65'; Míchel (yellow card) 78'; Lafita 86'; Gavilán (yellow card) 90+3' | Stadium: Anoeta; Attendance: 22,763; Referee: Xavier Estrada Fernández |

| 15 December 2012 16 | Getafe | 1–1 | Osasuna | Getafe |
| | Lopo (yellow card) 65'; Lafita (yellow card) 74'; Míchel (yellow card) 75'; Valera (yellow card) 83'; Castro 90+2' | | Nano (yellow card) 48'; Armenteros (red card) 78'; Sola 85', (yellow card) 86'; Oier (yellow card) 88'; Puñal (yellow card) 90+1' | Stadium: Coliseum Alfonso Pérez; Attendance: 8,000; Referee: José Antonio Teixeira Vitienes |

| 21 December 2012 17 | Valencia | v | Getafe | Valencia |
| | Soldado 1', (yellow card) 88'; Jonas 7'; R. Costa 30'; Rami (yellow card) 40'; Albelda (yellow card) 88'; Valdez 90+4' | | Vázquez 13', (yellow card) 87'; Rafa (yellow card) 43'; Alexis 60'; X. Torres (yellow card) 81'; M. Torres (yellow card) 85' | Stadium: Mestalla; Attendance: 25,000; Referee: Carlos Delgado Ferreiro |

| 7 January 2013 18 | Rayo Vallecano | 3–1 | Getafe | Madrid |
| | Bangoura 14'; Piti 28', 52', (yellow card) 48' | | Castro (yellow card) 39'; Alcácer 65'; Míchel (red card) 72'; M. Torres (yellow card) 80' | Stadium: Campo de Vallecas; Attendance: 11,000; Referee: Miguel Ayza Gámez |

| 14 January 2013 19 | Getafe | 2–2 | Granada | Getafe |
| | Colunga (yellow card) 13'; Rodríguez 19'; Castro (yellow card) 39'; Alcácer 42'; Gavilán (yellow card) 45'; Rafa (yellow card) 90+2' | | Iriney (yellow card) 11'; Mainz (yellow card) 17'; Siqueira 28' (pen.), 90+3' (pen.) | Stadium: Coliseum Alfonso Pérez; Attendance: 5,000; Referee: Alfonso Álvarez Izquierdo |

| 19 January 2013 20 | Getafe | 1–1 | Sevilla | Getafe |
| | Colunga 44', (yellow card) 77'; Alexis (yellow card) 52'; Borja (yellow card) 63'; X. Torres (yellow card) 83' | | Reyes 40'; Coke (yellow card) 71'; Kondogbia (yellow card) 83' | Stadium: Coliseum Alfonso Pérez; Attendance: 7,000; Referee: Antonio Mateu Lahoz |

| 27 January 2013 21 | Real Madrid | 4–0 | Getafe | Madrid |
| | Albiol (yellow card) 11'; Özil (yellow card) 27'; Ramos 53'; Ronaldo 62', 65', 72' (pen.) | | Sarabia (yellow card) 14'; M. Torres (yellow card) 19'; Gavilán (yellow card) 31'; Moyà (yellow card) 54'; Lopo (yellow card) 56'; Alexis (yellow card) 88' | Stadium: Santiago Bernabéu; Attendance: 71,108; Referee: José González González |

| 2 February 2013 22 | Getafe | 3–1 | Deportivo La Coruña | Getafe |
| | Moyà (red card) 10'; Castro 25' (pen.), (yellow card) 52'; Barrada (yellow card) 27'; Borja (yellow card) 31'; Rafa (yellow card) 66'; Á. Vázquez 81'; Colunga 84' | | Pizzi 12' (pen.); Aguilar (yellow card) 21' (yellow-red card) 70'; Evaldo (yellow card) 24'; J. Vázquez (yellow card) 33'; Bergantiños (yellow card) 53'; Camuñas (yellow card) 56'; Santos (yellow card) 80' | Stadium: Coliseum Alfonso Pérez; Attendance: 9,000; Referee: José Paradas Romero |

| 10 February 2013 23 | Barcelona | 6–1 | Getafe | Barcelona |
| | Sánchez 6'; Messi 13'; Villa 58'; Song (yellow card) 58'; Tello 79'; Iniesta 90'; Piqué 90+2' | | Lopo (yellow card) 39'; Castro (yellow card) 42'; Vázquez 83' | Stadium: Camp Nou; Attendance: 85,610; Referee: Ignacio Iglesias Villanueva |

| 16 February 2013 24 | Getafe | 3–1 | Celta Vigo | Getafe |
| | Colunga 10'; Borja (yellow card) 14'; Castro 34'; F. Fernández 42' | | Cabral (yellow card) 10'; A. Fernández 20' | Stadium: Coliseum Alfonso Pérez; Attendance: 9,000; Referee: Miguel Ayza Gámez |

| 23 February 2013 25 | Mallorca | 1–3 | Getafe | Palma |
| | Geromel (yellow card) 6'; Dos Santos 24'; Martí (yellow card) 62'; Nunes (yellow card) 70' | | Fernández (yellow card) 33'; X. Torres (yellow card) 44'; Borja (yellow card) 49'; Castro 71' (pen.); Alexis (yellow card) 73'; Colunga 82', 86' | Stadium: Iberostar; Attendance: 13,250; Referee: Fernando Teixeira Vitienes |

| 1 March 2013 26 | Getafe | 2–0 | Real Zaragoza | Getafe |
| | Colunga 21'; Alexis (yellow card) 33'; Borja (yellow card) 51'; Lacen (yellow card) 53'; Escudero 61'; Pedro León (yellow card) 62' (yellow-red card) 63' | | Loovens (yellow card) 50' (yellow-red card) 59'; Álvaro (yellow card) 74'; José Mari (yellow card) 90+2' | Stadium: Coliseum Alfonso Pérez; Attendance: 8,000; Referee: César Muñiz Fernández |

| 10 March 2013 27 | Levante | 0–0 | Getafe | Valencia |
| | López (yellow card) 55'; García (yellow card) 67' | | M. Torres (yellow card) 41'; Colunga (yellow card) 67'; Alexis (yellow card) 87' | Stadium: Ciutat de València; Attendance: 16,162; Referee: Alberto Undiano Mallenco |

| 16 March 2013 28 | Getafe | 1–0 | Athletic Bilbao | Getafe |
| | Borja 6', (yellow card) 90+1'; Fernández (yellow card) 39' | | Aduriz (yellow card) 20'; Iturraspe (yellow card) 36'; Herrera (yellow card) 49'; Laporte (yellow card) 84' | Stadium: Coliseum Alfonso Pérez; Attendance: 9,000; Referee: Ignacio Iglesias Villanueva |

| 1 April 2013 29 | Real Betis | 0–0 | Getafe | Seville |
| | Beñat (yellow card) 53'; Amaya (yellow card) 76'; Cañas (yellow card) 88'; Campbell (yellow card) 90+1' | | Borja (yellow card) 18'; X. Torres (yellow card) 75' | Stadium: Benito Villamarín; Attendance: 25,081; Referee: Fernando Teixeira Vitienes |

| 7 April 2013 30 | Getafe | 0–0 | Atlético Madrid | Getafe |
| | Alexis (yellow card) 9'; Valera (yellow card) 88' | | Suárez (yellow card) 53' (yellow-red card) 72'; Gabi (yellow card) 68'; Godín (yellow card) 69' (yellow-red card) 90+2' | Stadium: Coliseum Alfonso Pérez; Attendance: 10,000; Referee: Carlos Delgado Ferreiro |

| 13 April 2013 31 | Real Valladolid | 2–1 | Getafe | Valladolid |
| | Rubio (yellow card) 6'; Óscar 68'; Guerra 73'; Sastre (yellow card) 87' | | Alcácer 45'; Codina (yellow card) 55'; Lopo (yellow card) 63'; Alexis (red card) 76' | Stadium: José Zorrilla; Attendance: 17,394; Referee: Miguel Ayza Gámez |

| 21 April 2013 32 | Getafe | 0–2 | Espanyol | Getafe |
| | Borja (yellow card) 19' (yellow-red card) 52'; Fernández (yellow card) 26' (yellow-red card) 73'; Castro (yellow card) 45'; X. Torres (yellow card) 68' | | Sánchez (yellow card) 3'; Colotto (yellow card) 6'; Verdú 37'; Stuani (yellow card) 39', (goal) 72'; García (yellow card) 53'; Forlín (yellow card) 63'; C. Álvarez (yellow card) 73'; Wakaso (yellow card) 75' | Stadium: Coliseum Alfonso Pérez; Attendance: 8,000; Referee: Fernando Teixeira Vitienes |

| 28 April 2013 33 | Málaga | 2–1 | Getafe | Málaga |
| | Iturra (yellow card) 11'; Santa Cruz 40', (yellow card) 70'; Weligton 47'; Camacho (yellow card) 88' | | Castro (yellow card) 31'; Valera 70'; Lopo (yellow card) 74'; Sarabia (yellow card) 90+4' | Stadium: La Rosaleda; Attendance: 27,000; Referee: Carlos Clos Gómez |

| 6 May 2013 34 | Getafe | 2–1 | Real Sociedad | Getafe |
| | Pedro León 18'; Castro (yellow card) 37'; Barrada 39', (yellow card) 51'; Fernández (yellow card) 60' | | Vela 5'; Griezmann (yellow card) 56'; González (yellow card) 64'; I. Martínez (yellow card) 90' | Stadium: Coliseum Alfonso Pérez; Attendance: 9,000; Referee: Alberto Undiano Mallenco |

| 11 May 2013 35 | Osasuna | 1–0 | Getafe | Pamplona |
| | Armenteros (yellow card) 28'; Puñal (yellow card) 67'; Arribas 75'; Llorente (yellow card) 90+1' | | Rafa (yellow card) 19'; Borja (yellow card) 44'; Lacen (yellow card) 60'; Míchel (yellow card) 71'; Pedro León (yellow card) 90' | Stadium: El Sadar; Attendance: 18,012; Referee: Alfonso Álvarez Izquierdo |

| 18 May 2013 36 | Getafe | 0–1 | Valencia | Getafe |
| | Valera (yellow card) 15'; Lafita (yellow card) 20' | | R. Costa (yellow card) 30'; Mathieu 44' | Stadium: Coliseum Alfonso Pérez; Attendance: 7,000; Referee: Fernando Teixeira Vitienes |

| 26 May 2013 37 | Getafe | 1–2 | Rayo Vallecano | Getafe |
| | Míchel (yellow card) 12'; Valera (yellow card) 19'; Fernández (yellow card) 22'; Rafa 48'; Lafita (yellow card) 66'; Castro (yellow card) 82' | | Arbilla (yellow card) 30'; José Carlos (yellow card) 36'; Figueras (yellow card) 40'; Vázquez (yellow card) 45'; Domínguez 53'; Nacho (yellow card) 67'; Castro 90' (o.g.) | Stadium: Coliseum Alfonso Pérez; Attendance: 8,000; Referee: Carlos Clos Gómez |

| 1 June 2013 38 | Granada | 2–0 | Getafe | Granada |
| | Nolito 29'; El-Arabi 63', (yellow card) 78' | | Lopo (yellow card) 8' | Stadium: Los Cármenes; Attendance: 19,000; Referee: Alejandro Hernández Hernández |

=== Copa del Rey ===
==== Round of 32 ====
| 1 November 2012 First leg | Ponferradina | 0–4 | Getafe | Ponferrada |
| 19:00 | | | Gavilán 13', 65'; Sarabia 45'; Alcácer 68'; Lacen (yellow card) 71' | Stadium: El Toralín; Attendance: 5,500; Referee: César Muñiz Fernández |

| 27 November 2012 Second leg | Getafe | 0–0 (4–0 agg.) | Ponferradina | Getafe |
| | Fraile (yellow card) 57' | | Moreno (yellow card) 46'; Isaías (yellow card) 84' | Stadium: Coliseum Alfonso Pérez; Attendance: 2,000; Referee: Pedro Pérez Montero |

==== Round of 16 ====
| 12 December 2012 First leg | Atlético Madrid | 3–0 | Getafe | Madrid |
| | Costa 19' (pen.), 87'; Juanfran (yellow card) 28'; García (yellow card) 29'; Filipe Luís 80' | | Castro (yellow card) 15'; Alexis (yellow card) 18'; Valera (yellow card) 64'; Vázquez (yellow card) 72'; M. Torres (yellow card) 87'; Lafita (yellow card) 90+2' | Stadium: Vicente Calderón; Attendance: 7,000; Referee: Antonio Mateu Lahoz |

| 10 January 2013 Second leg | Getafe | 0–0 (0–3 agg.) | Atlético Madrid | Getafe |
| | Rafa (red card) 33'; Rodríguez (yellow card) 36' | | Belözoğlu (yellow card) 60'; Cisma (yellow card) 71' | Stadium: Coliseum Alfonso Pérez; Attendance: 5,000; Referee: Ignacio Iglesias Villanueva |
