= Juan Valera =

Juan Valera may refer to:

- Juan Valera y Alcalá-Galiano (1824–1905), Spanish author, diplomat and politician
- Juan Valera (footballer) (born 1984), Spanish footballer
