= 2017–18 Atlético Madrid season =

87th season in existence of Atlético Madrid

Atlético Madrid
2017–18 season
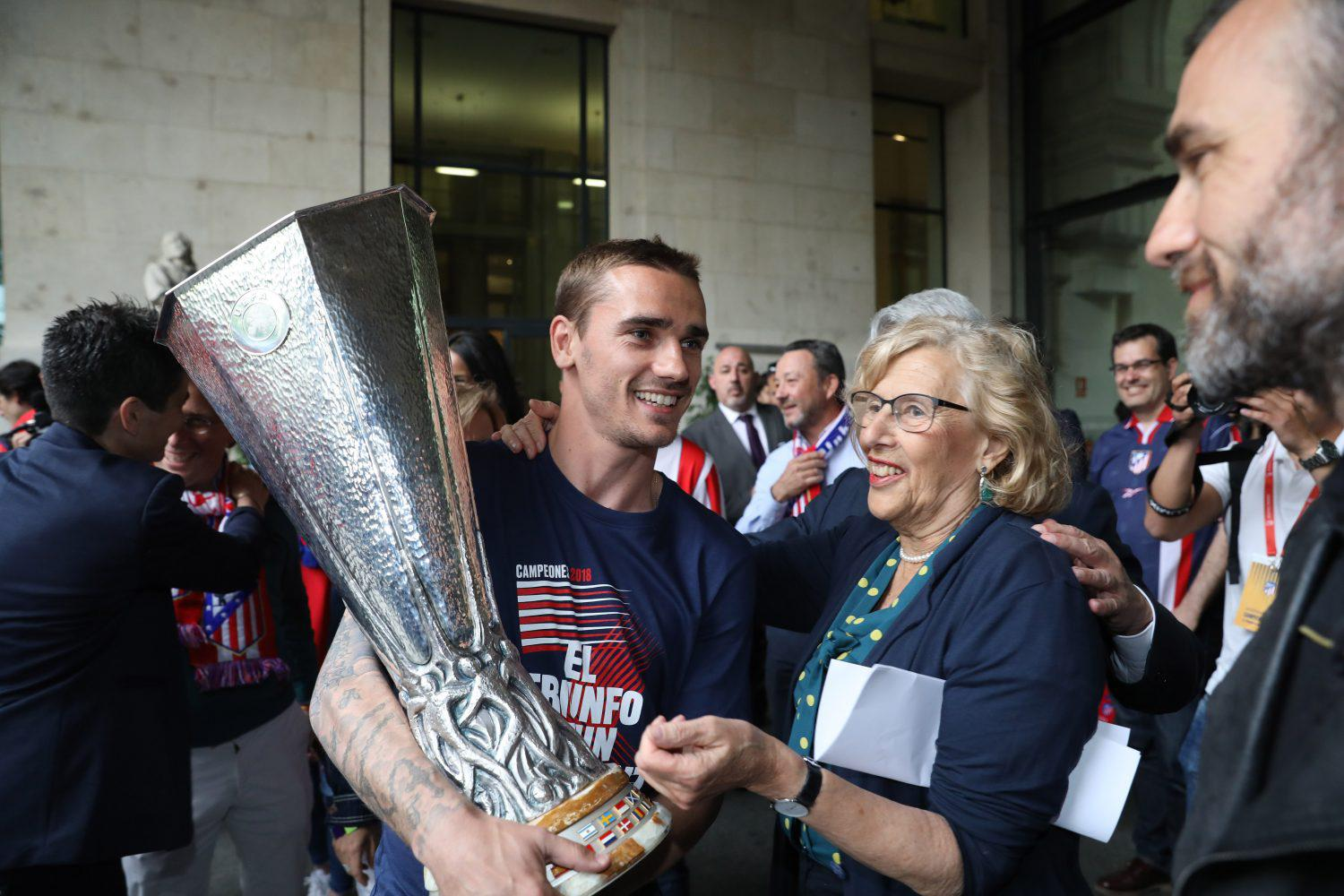
- Antoine Griezmann with the UEFA Europa League trophy.
- President: Enrique Cerezo
- Head coach: Diego Simeone
- Stadium: Wanda Metropolitano
- La Liga: 2nd
- Copa del Rey: Quarter-finals
- UEFA Champions League: Group stage
- UEFA Europa League: Winners
- Top goalscorer: League: Antoine Griezmann (19); All: Antoine Griezmann (29)
- Highest home attendance: 66,496 (vs Real Madrid)
- Lowest home attendance: 28,033 (vs Lleida Esportiu)
- Average home league attendance: 53,101
Home colours	Away colours	Third colours

The 2017–18 season was Atlético Madrid's 87th season since foundation in 1903 and the club's 81st season in La Liga, the top league of Spanish football. Atlético competed in La Liga, Copa del Rey, UEFA Champions League and UEFA Europa League. It was also the first season that Atlético played at the Wanda Metropolitano.

This campaign was the very first since the 2009–10 without Tiago who retired after last season's conclusion.

== Kits ==
Supplier: Nike / First Sponsor: Plus500

Home	Home alt.	Away	Away alt.	Third

Goalkeeper 1	Goalkeeper 2	Goalkeeper 3

== Players ==
N	Pos.	Nat.	Name	Age	EU	Since	App	Goals	Ends	Transfer fee	Notes
2	DF	(Uruguay)	Diego Godín	32	EU	2010	305	22	2019	€8M	Second nationality: (Spain)
3	DF	(Brazil)	Filipe Luís	32	EU	2010–2014; 2015	273	9	2019	€16M	Second nationality: (Italy)
5	MF	(Ghana)	Thomas Partey	25	Non-EU	2013	47	4	2023	Academy	
6	MF	(Spain)	Koke	26	EU	2009	323	28	2024	Academy	
7	FW	(France)	Antoine Griezmann	27	EU	2014	160	83	2022	€30M	
8	MF	(Spain)	Saúl	23	EU	2012	148	22	2026	Academy	
9	FW	(Spain)	Fernando Torres	34	EU	2001–2007; 2015	359	119	2018	Free	Originally from Academy
11	FW	(Argentina)	Ángel Correa	23	Non-EU	2014	83	16	2019	€7.5M	
13	GK	(Slovenia)	Jan Oblak	25	EU	2014	113	0	2021	€16M	
14	MF	(Spain)	Gabi (captain)	34	EU	2004–2007; 2011	367	9	2018	€3M	Originally from Academy
15	DF	(Montenegro)	Stefan Savić	27	Non-EU	2015	73	1	2020	€25M	
16	DF	(Croatia)	Šime Vrsaljko	26	EU	2016	25	1	2021	€16M	
18	FW	(Spain)	Diego Costa	29	EU	2007–2009; 2010–2014; 2018	135	64	2022	€65M	Second nationality: (Brazil)
19	DF	(France)	Lucas Hernandez	22	EU	2014	44	0	2022	Academy	Second nationality: (Spain)
20	DF	(Spain)	Juanfran	33	EU	2011	295	6	2018	€4.25M	
21	FW	(France)	Kevin Gameiro	31	EU	2016	46	16	2020	€32M	
23	MF	(Spain)	Vitolo	28	EU	2017	0	0	2022	€35.7M	
24	DF	(Uruguay)	José Giménez	23	EU	2013	96	4	2018	€0.9M	Second nationality: (Spain)
25	GK	(Argentina)	Axel Werner	22	Non-EU	2016	0	0	2021	€0.8M	

- Ordered by squad number.

== Transfers ==
=== In ===
No.	Pos.	Nat.	Name	Age	EU	Moving from	Type	Transfer window	Ends	Transfer fee	Source
–	DF	(Brazil)	Guilherme Siqueira	31	EU	Valencia	Loan return	Summer		Free	
–	MF	(Argentina)	Matías Kranevitter	23	EU	Sevilla	Loan return	Summer		Free	
–	DF	(France)	Théo Hernandez	19	EU	Alavés	Loan return	Summer		Free	
–	DF	(Spain)	Javier Manquillo	23	EU	(England) Sunderland	Loan return	Summer		Free	
25	GK	(Argentina)	Axel Werner	21	Non-EU	(Argentina) Boca Juniors	Loan return	Summer		Free	
18	FW	(Colombia)	Rafael Santos Borré	21	Non-EU	Villarreal	Loan return	Summer		Free	
–	CM	(Ghana)	Bernard Mensah	22	Non-EU	(Portugal) Vitória de Guimarães	Loan return	Summer		Free	
–	DF	(Uruguay)	Emiliano Velázquez	23	Non-EU	(Portugal) Braga	Loan return	Summer		Free	
17	FW	(Argentina)	Luciano Vietto	23	Non-EU	Sevilla	Loan return	Summer		Free	
–	MF	(Portugal)	Diogo Jota	20	EU	(Portugal) Porto	Loan return	Summer		Free	
33	FW	(Ghana)	Amath Ndiaye	20	Non-EU	Tenerife	Loan return	Summer		Free	
–	MF	(Spain)	Vitolo	27	EU	Sevilla	Transfer	Summer		€36M	
18	FW	(Spain)	Diego Costa	29	EU	(England) Chelsea	Transfer^{1}	Winter		€65M	Atletico.com
23	MF	(Spain)	Vitolo	28	EU	Las Palmas	Loan return	Winter		Free	
–	GK	(Portugal)	André Moreira	22	EU	(Portugal) Braga	Loan return	Winter		Free	

^{1}would be registered and able to play after January 1, 2018.

=== Out ===
No.	Pos.	Nat.	Name	Age	EU	Moving to	Type	Transfer window	Transfer fee	Source
5	MF	(Portugal)	Tiago Mendes	36	EU	Unattached	Retired	Summer	Free	
17	MF	(Italy)	Alessio Cerci	29	EU	(Italy) Hellas Verona	End of contract	Summer	Free	Atlético.com
–	DF	(France)	Théo Hernandez	19	EU	Real Madrid	Transfer	Summer	€30M	Atlético.com
–	DF	(Spain)	Javier Manquillo	23	EU	(England) Newcastle United	Transfer	Summer	€5M	Atlético.com
–	MF	(Spain)	Vitolo	27	EU	Las Palmas	Loan	Summer	Free	Atlético.com
–	GK	(Portugal)	André Moreira	21	EU	(Portugal) Braga	Loan	Summer	Free	Atlético.com
–	MF	(Portugal)	Diogo Jota	20	EU	(England) Wolverhampton Wanderers	Loan	Summer	Free	Atlético.com
–	MF	(Ghana)	Bernard Mensah	22	Non-EU	(Turkey) Kasımpaşa	Loan	Summer	Free	kasimpasa.com.tr
–	MF	(Uruguay)	Emiliano Velázquez	23	Non-EU	Rayo Vallecano	Loan	Summer	Free	rayovallecano.es
18	FW	(Colombia)	Rafael Santos Borré	21	Non-EU	(Argentina) River Plate	Transfer	Summer	Undisclosed	Atlético.com
23	MF	(Argentina)	Matías Kranevitter	23	EU	(Russia) Zenit Saint Petersburg	Transfer	Summer	Undisclosed	Atlético.com
33	FW	(Ghana)	Amath Ndiaye	20	Non-EU	Getafe	Transfer^{1}	Summer	Undisclosed	getafecf.com
–	DF	(Brazil)	Guilherme Siqueira	31	EU	Unattached	Retired	Summer	Free	
–	GK	(Portugal)	André Moreira	22	EU	(Portugal) Belenenses	Loan	Winter	Free	
17	FW	(Argentina)	Luciano Vietto	24	EU	Valencia	Loan	Winter	Free	valenciacf.com
12	MF	(Argentina)	Augusto Fernández	31	EU	(China) Beijing Renhe	Transfer	Winter	Undisclosed	Atlético.com
10	MF	(Belgium)	Yannick Carrasco	24	EU	(China) Dalian Yifang	Transfer	Winter	Undisclosed	Atlético.com
22	MF	(Argentina)	Nicolás Gaitán	29	EU	(China) Dalian Yifang	Transfer	Winter	Undisclosed	Atlético.com
1	GK	(Spain)	Miguel Ángel Moyà	33	EU	Real Sociedad	Transfer	Winter	Free	Atlético.com
27	MF	(Brazil)	Caio Henrique	20	Non-EU	(Brazil) Paraná	Loan	Winter	Free	paranaclube.com.br

^{1}50% of rights sold, player signed contract for 5 years.

== Pre-season and friendlies ==
=== Summer ===
Win Draw Loss Cancelled

26 July 2017 1	Toluca	0–0	Atlético Madrid	Toluca, Mexico
3:00 CEST (UTC+02:00)		Report		Stadium: Estadio Nemesio Díez; Referee: Fernando Guerrero

1 August 2017 2	Atlético Madrid	2–1	Napoli	Munich, Germany
17:45 CEST (UTC+02:00)	Savić (yellow card) 37'; Torres 72'; Vietto 81'; Godín (yellow card) 83' (yellow-red card) 89'	Report	Callejón 56'; Jorginho (yellow card) 59'; Rog (yellow card) 64'; Koulibaly (yellow card) 86'	Stadium: Allianz Arena; Referee: Benjamin Brand (Germany)

2 August 2017 3	Liverpool	1–1 (4–5 p)	Atlético Madrid	Munich, Germany
20:45 CEST (UTC+02:00)	Firmino 83' (pen.)	Report	Bare 33'	Stadium: Allianz Arena; Referee: Felix Brych (Germany)
	Penalties
	Firmino (penalty scored); Henderson (penalty missed); Origi (penalty scored); Kent (penalty scored); Grujić (penalty scored)		(penalty scored) Griezmann; (penalty scored) Torres; (penalty scored) Gabi; (penalty scored) Gaitán; (penalty scored) Filipe Luís

6 August 2017 4	Brighton & Hove Albion	2–3	Atlético Madrid	Falmer, England
16:00 BST	Groß 61'; Sidwell 77'	Report	Gaitán 42'; Torres 67'; Partey (yellow card) 86'; Hernandez 88'	Stadium: Falmer Stadium; Attendance: 27,343; Referee: Kevin Friend (England)

11 August 2017 5	Getafe	0–0	Atlético Madrid	Getafe
20:30 CEST (UTC+02:00)		Report		Stadium: Coliseum Alfonso Pérez

12 August 2017 6	Leganés	0–1	Atlético Madrid	Leganés
10:30 CEST (UTC+02:00)	Pérez (yellow card) 85'	Report	Moreno 66'	Stadium: Butarque

=== Winter ===
30 December 2017 7	Al Ahly	2–3	Atlético Madrid	Alexandria, Egypt
19:00 CET (UTC+01:00)	Zakaria 40'; El Sheikh 52'	Report	Gameiro 64', 73', 81'	Stadium: Borg El Arab Stadium; Attendance: 50,000

=== GOtv Max Cup ===
22 May 2018 8	Nigeria	2–3	Atlético Madrid	Uyo, Nigeria
19:00 CEST (UTC+02:00)	Nwakali 31'; Usman 80'	Report	Correa 33'; Torres 64'; Borja 85'	Stadium: Godswill Akpabio International Stadium; Referee: Bashir Salisu

== Competitions ==
Win Draw Loss

=== Overview ===
Competition	First match	Last match	Starting round	Final position	Record							
Competition	First match	Last match	Starting round	Final position	Pld	W	D	L	GF	GA	GD	Win %
La Liga	19 August 2017	20 May 2018	Matchday 1	2nd	38	23	10	5	58	22	+36	60.53
Copa del Rey	25 October 2017	23 January 2018	Round of 32	Quarter-finals	6	3	1	2	13	6	+7	50.00
Champions League	12 September 2017	5 December 2017	Group stage	Group stage	6	1	4	1	5	4	+1	16.67
Europa League	15 February 2018	16 May 2018	Round of 32	Winners	9	7	1	1	20	3	+17	77.78
Total					59	34	16	9	96	35	+61	57.63

Last updated: 20 May 2018
Source: Competitions

=== La Liga ===
==== League table ====
Pos	Team	Pld	W	D	L	GF	GA	GD	Pts	Qualification or relegation
1	Barcelona (C)	38	28	9	1	99	29	+70	93	Qualification for the Champions League group stage
2	Atlético Madrid	38	23	10	5	58	22	+36	79	Qualification for the Champions League group stage
3	Real Madrid	38	22	10	6	94	44	+50	76	Qualification for the Champions League group stage
4	Valencia	38	22	7	9	65	38	+27	73	Qualification for the Champions League group stage
5	Villarreal	38	18	7	13	57	50	+7	61	Qualification for the Europa League group stage (Note: Since the winners of the 2017–18 Copa del Rey, Barcelona, qualified for European competition based on league position, the spot awarded to the cup winners (Europa League group stage) was passed to the sixth-placed team and the spot awarded to the sixth-placed team (Europa League second qualifying round) was passed to the seventh-placed team.)

Source: La Liga, Soccerway
Rules for classification: 1) Points; 2) Head-to-head points; 3) Head-to-head goal difference; 4) Goal difference; 5) Goals scored; 6) Fair-play points (Note: Head-to-head record is used only after all the matches between the teams in question have been played)
(C) Champions

==== Results summary ====
Overall								Home						Away					
Pld	W	D	L	GF	GA	GD	Pts	W	D	L	GF	GA	GD	W	D	L	GF	GA	GD
38	23	10	5	58	22	+36	79	12	6	1	30	8	+22	11	4	4	28	14	+14

Last updated: 20 May 2018.
Source: Competitive matches

==== Results by round ====
Round	1	2	3	4	5	6	7	8	9	10	11	12	13	14	15	16	17	18	19	20	21	22	23	24	25	26	27	28	29	30	31	32	33	34	35	36	37	38
Ground	A	A	A	H	A	H	A	H	A	H	A	H	A	H	A	H	A	H	A	H	H	H	A	H	A	H	A	H	A	H	A	H	A	H	A	H	A	H
Result	D	W	D	W	W	W	D	D	W	D	W	D	W	W	W	W	L	W	W	D	W	W	W	W	W	W	L	W	L	W	D	W	L	D	W	L	W	D
Position	8	4	6	5	3	2	4	4	4	4	4	4	3	3	3	2	2	2	2	2	2	2	2	2	2	2	2	2	2	2	2	2	2	2	2	2	2	2

Updated to match(es) played on 20 May 2018. Source: Competitive matches
A = Away; H = Home; W = Win; D = Draw; L = Loss

==== Matches ====
19 August 2017 1	Girona	2–2	Atlético Madrid	Girona
20:15 CEST (UTC+02:00)	Stuani 22', 25', (yellow card) 45'; Pons (yellow card) 90+4'	Report	Carrasco (yellow card) 28'; Saúl (yellow card) 50'; Hernandez (yellow card) 61'; Griezmann (yellow card) 67' (red card) 67'; Correa 78'; Giménez 85'	Stadium: Montilivi; Attendance: 11,511; Referee: Juan Martínez Munuera

26 August 2017 2	Las Palmas	1–5	Atlético Madrid	Las Palmas
22:15 CEST (UTC+02:00)	Hernán (yellow card) 14'; Bigas (yellow card) 24'; González (yellow card) 39'; Calleri 58'; Viera (yellow card) 62'	Report	Correa 3'; Carrasco 5'; Vietto (yellow card) 39'; Koke 62', 75'; Partey 88'	Stadium: Gran Canaria; Attendance: 20,310; Referee: Ignacio Iglesias Villanueva

9 September 2017 3	Valencia	0–0	Atlético Madrid	Valencia
16:15 CEST (UTC+02:00)	Montoya (yellow card) 35'	Report		Stadium: Mestalla; Attendance: 43,859; Referee: José González González

16 September 2017 4	Atlético Madrid	1–0	Málaga	Madrid
20:45 CEST (UTC+02:00)	Griezmann 61'; Carrasco (yellow card) 64'; Juanfran (yellow card) 76'	Report	Keko (yellow card) 88'; Recio (yellow card) 90+3'	Stadium: Wanda Metropolitano; Attendance: 63,114; Referee: José María Sánchez Martínez

20 September 2017 5	Athletic Bilbao	1–2	Atlético Madrid	Bilbao
19:00 CEST (UTC+02:00)	García 90+2'	Report	Partey (yellow card) 25'; Filipe Luís (yellow card) 39'; Correa 55'; Carrasco 73'	Stadium: San Mamés; Attendance: 43,381; Referee: Xavier Estrada Fernández

23 September 2017 6	Atlético Madrid	2–0	Sevilla	Madrid
13:00 CEST (UTC+02:00)	Gabi (yellow card) 28'; Carrasco 46', (yellow card) 47'; Vrsaljko (yellow card) 67'; Griezmann 69'; Correa (yellow card) 76'	Report	Muriel (yellow card) 49'; Mercado (yellow card) 53'; Lenglet (yellow card) 84'	Stadium: Wanda Metropolitano; Attendance: 60,823; Referee: Juan Martínez Munuera

30 September 2017 7	Leganés	0–0	Atlético Madrid	Leganés
20:45 CEST (UTC+02:00)	Pérez (yellow card) 48'; Szymanowski (yellow card) 77'	Report	Vrsaljko (yellow card) 89'	Stadium: Butarque; Attendance: 11,454; Referee: Jesús Gil Manzano

15 October 2017 8	Atlético Madrid	1–1	Barcelona	Madrid
20:45 CEST (UTC+02:00)	Gabi (yellow card) 14'; Saúl 21', (yellow card) 90+2'; Griezmann (yellow card) 90+3'	Report	Umtiti (yellow card) 33'; Rakitić (yellow card) 45'; L. Suárez 82'	Stadium: Wanda Metropolitano; Attendance: 64,393; Referee: Antonio Mateu Lahoz

22 October 2017 9	Celta Vigo	0–1	Atlético Madrid	Vigo
16:15 CEST (UTC+02:00)	Jonny (yellow card) 49'; Cabral (yellow card) 71'; Hernández (yellow card) 82'	Report	Savić (yellow card) 16'; Gameiro 28'; Saúl (yellow card) 41'; Gabi (yellow card) 57'; Juanfran (yellow card) 89'; Partey (yellow card) 90+3'	Stadium: Balaídos; Attendance: 12,978; Referee: José Luis Munuera Montero

28 October 2017 10	Atlético Madrid	1–1	Villarreal	Madrid
18:30 CEST (UTC+02:00)	Correa 61'	Report	Trigueros (yellow card) 25'; Bakambu (yellow card) 55'; Bacca (yellow card) 79', (goal) 81'; Álvaro (yellow card) 85'	Stadium: Wanda Metropolitano; Attendance: 61,421; Referee: Alberto Undiano Mallenco

4 November 2017 11	Deportivo La Coruña	0–1	Atlético Madrid	A Coruña
16:15 CET (UTC+01:00)	Juanfran (yellow card) 77'; Luisinho (yellow card) 78'; Andone (yellow card) 84'; Sidnei (yellow card) 90'	Report	Griezmann (yellow card) 9'; Savić (yellow card) 21'; Partey 90+1'	Stadium: Abanca Riazor; Attendance: 22,733; Referee: Alfonso Álvarez Izquierdo

18 November 2017 12	Atlético Madrid	0–0	Real Madrid	Madrid
20:45 CET (UTC+01:00)	Savić (yellow card) 34'; Saúl (yellow card) 63'; Koke (yellow card) 70'; Juanfran (yellow card) 77'; Hernandez (yellow card) 82'; Godín (yellow card) 89'	Report	Carvajal (yellow card) 20'; Nacho (yellow card) 82'	Stadium: Wanda Metropolitano; Attendance: 66,496; Referee: David Fernández Borbalán

25 November 2017 13	Levante	0–5	Atlético Madrid	Valencia
20:45 CET (UTC+01:00)	Chema (yellow card) 52'; Morales (yellow card) 54'	Report	Róber 5' (o.g.); Gameiro 29', 59'; Griezmann 65', 68'; Koke (yellow card) 90+2'	Stadium: Ciutat de València; Attendance: 21,549; Referee: Daniel Trujillo Suárez

2 December 2017 14	Atlético Madrid	2–1	Real Sociedad	Madrid
16:15 CET (UTC+01:00)	Godín (yellow card) 40'; Filipe Luís 63'; Griezmann 88'	Report	Willian José 29' (pen.); Prieto (yellow card) 50'; Rulli (yellow card) 73'	Stadium: Wanda Metropolitano; Attendance: 57,394; Referee: Santiago Jaime Latre

10 December 2017 15	Real Betis	0–1	Atlético Madrid	Seville
16:15 CET (UTC+01:00)	Boudebouz (yellow card) 1'; Guardado (yellow card) 43'; Mandi (yellow card) 79'; León (yellow card) 90+6'	Report	Correa (yellow card) 14'; Saúl 29'; Godín (yellow card) 51'; Filipe Luís (yellow card) 59'	Stadium: Benito Villamarín; Attendance: 45,517; Referee: Alejandro Hernández Hernández

17 December 2017 16	Atlético Madrid	1–0	Alavés	Madrid
20:45 CET (UTC+01:00)	Partey (yellow card) 18'; Savić (yellow card) 34'; Godín (yellow card) 67'; Torres 74'	Report	Maripán (yellow card) 35'; Pina (yellow card) 55'; Duarte (yellow card) 61'; Alexis (yellow card) 86'	Stadium: Wanda Metropolitano; Attendance: 49,937; Referee: Jesús Gil Manzano

22 December 2017 17	Espanyol	1–0	Atlético Madrid	Barcelona
21:30 CET (UTC+01:00)	Javi López (yellow card) 82'; Sergio García 88'; Pau López (yellow card) 90+3'	Report	Saúl (yellow card) 51'; Koke (yellow card) 73'; Gabi (yellow card) 83'; Vrsaljko (yellow card) 89'; Fernández (yellow card) 90+4'	Stadium: RCDE Stadium; Attendance: 19,327; Referee: Melero López

6 January 2018 18	Atlético Madrid	2–0	Getafe	Madrid
13:00 CET (UTC+01:00)	Vrsaljko (yellow card) 14'; Correa 18'; Hernandez (yellow card) 24'; Gabi (yellow card) 30'; Griezmann (yellow card) 44'; Savić (yellow card) 45'; Costa (yellow card) 62' (yellow-red card) 68', (goal) 68'	Report	Portillo (yellow card) 29'; Cala (yellow card) 45'; Djené (yellow card) 74'	Stadium: Wanda Metropolitano; Attendance: 47,023; Referee: José Luis Munuera Montero

13 January 2018 19	Eibar	0–1	Atlético Madrid	Eibar
18:30 CET (UTC+01:00)	Alejo (yellow card) 10'; Ramis (yellow card) 33'	Report	Gameiro 27'; Godín (yellow card) 73'	Stadium: Ipurua; Attendance: 6,186; Referee: Antonio Mateu Lahoz

21 January 2018 20	Atlético Madrid	1–1	Girona	Madrid
16:15 CET (UTC+01:00)	Griezmann 34'; Partey (yellow card) 45'; Vrsaljko (yellow card) 66'; Giménez (yellow card) 82'; Oblak (yellow card) 90'	Report	Juanpe (yellow card) 31'; Aday (yellow card) 37'; Portu 73'; Bernardo (yellow card) 82'	Stadium: Wanda Metropolitano; Attendance: 55,076; Referee: Ricardo de Burgos Bengoetxea

28 January 2018 21	Atlético Madrid	3–0	Las Palmas	Madrid
16:15 CET (UTC+01:00)	Griezmann 61'; Torres 73'; Saúl (yellow card) 82'; Partey 88'	Report	Ximo Navarro (yellow card) 67'; Gálvez (yellow card) 85'	Stadium: Wanda Metropolitano; Attendance: 55,363; Referee: Álvarez Izquierdo

4 February 2018 22	Atlético Madrid	1–0	Valencia	Madrid
20:45 CET (UTC+01:00)	Correa 59'; Gabi (yellow card) 74'	Report	Gayà (yellow card) 90+3'	Stadium: Wanda Metropolitano; Attendance: 49,596; Referee: Iglesias Villanueva

10 February 2018 23	Málaga	0–1	Atlético Madrid	Málaga
16:15 CET (UTC+01:00)	Iturra (yellow card) 20'; Lacen (yellow card) 60'; En-Nesyri (yellow card) 78'	Report	Griezmann 1'; Saúl (yellow card) 41'; Vrsaljko (yellow card) 67'	Stadium: La Rosaleda; Attendance: 25,482; Referee: José María Sánchez Martínez

18 February 2018 24	Atlético Madrid	2–0	Athletic Bilbao	Madrid
16:15 CET (UTC+01:00)	Correa (yellow card) 17'; Costa (yellow card) 36', (goal) 80'; Filipe Luís (yellow card) 62'; Gameiro 67'	Report	Beñat (yellow card) 40'; Unai Núñez (yellow card) 71'	Stadium: Wanda Metropolitano; Attendance: 60,022; Referee: González González

25 February 2018 25	Sevilla	2–5	Atlético Madrid	Seville
20:45 CET (UTC+01:00)	J. Correa (yellow card) 32'; Escudero (yellow card) 68'; Vázquez (yellow card) 70'; Sarabia 85'; Nolito 89'	Report	Costa (yellow card) 28', (goal) 29'; Griezmann 42', 51' (pen.), 81'; Giménez (yellow card) 47'; Koke 65'; Saúl (yellow card) 90+1'	Stadium: Ramón Sánchez Pizjuán; Attendance: 37,884; Referee: Juan Martínez Munuera

28 February 2018 26	Atlético Madrid	4–0	Leganés	Madrid
21:30 CET (UTC+01:00)	Griezmann 26', 35', 56', 67', (yellow card) 69'	Report	Gumbau (yellow card) 53'; Omar (yellow card) 82'; Bustinza (yellow card) 86'	Stadium: Wanda Metropolitano; Attendance: 35,033; Referee: Xavier Estrada Fernández

4 March 2018 27	Barcelona	1–0	Atlético Madrid	Barcelona
16:15 CET (UTC+01:00)	Messi 26', (yellow card) 30'; Rakitić (yellow card) 69'	Report	Vrsaljko (yellow card) 31'; Giménez (yellow card) 57'	Stadium: Camp Nou; Attendance: 90,356; Referee: Jesús Gil Manzano

11 March 2018 28	Atlético Madrid	3–0	Celta Vigo	Madrid
16:15 CET (UTC+01:00)	Griezmann 44'; Saúl (yellow card) 48'; Vitolo 56'; Correa 63'	Report	Aspas (yellow card) 49'; S. Gómez (yellow card) 51'	Stadium: Wanda Metropolitano; Attendance: 55,076; Referee: Javier Alberola Rojas

18 March 2018 29	Villarreal	2–1	Atlético Madrid	Villarreal
18:30 CET (UTC+01:00)	Fornals (yellow card) 12'; Álvaro (yellow card) 45'; Rodri (yellow card) 66'; Bacca (yellow card) 67'; Ünal 82', 90+1'; Sansone (yellow card) 90+4'	Report	Griezmann (yellow card) 15', (goal) 20' (pen.); Giménez (yellow card) 61'; D. Costa (yellow card) 90+3'; Vitolo (red card) 90+3'	Stadium: Estadio de la Cerámica; Attendance: 19,385; Referee: David Fernández Borbalán

1 April 2018 30	Atlético Madrid	1–0	Deportivo La Coruña	Madrid
20:45 CEST (UTC+02:00)	Carlos Isaac (yellow card) 28'; Gameiro 34' (pen.); Costa (yellow card) 69'	Report	Luisinho (yellow card) 13'; Pérez (yellow card) 33'; Mosquera (yellow card) 90+2'	Stadium: Wanda Metropolitano; Referee: Daniel Trujillo Suárez

8 April 2018 31	Real Madrid	1–1	Atlético Madrid	Madrid
16:15 CEST (UTC+02:00)	Kroos (yellow card) 14'; Ronaldo 53'; Vázquez (yellow card) 88'	Report	Vitolo (yellow card) 17'; Partey (yellow card) 34'; Griezmann 57'; Hernandez (yellow card) 89'	Stadium: Santiago Bernabéu; Attendance: 78,769; Referee: Xavier Estrada Fernández

15 April 2018 32	Atlético Madrid	3–0	Levante	Madrid
16:15 CEST (UTC+02:00)	Hernandez (yellow card) 29'; Correa 33'; Griezmann (yellow card) 41', (goal) 48'; Torres 77'	Report	Pedro López (yellow card) 34'	Stadium: Wanda Metropolitano; Attendance: 58,043; Referee: Jesús Gil Manzano

18 April 2018 33	Real Sociedad	3–0	Atlético Madrid	San Sebastián
19:30 CEST (UTC+02:00)	Willian José 27'; Juanmi 80', 90+2', (yellow card) 90+3'	Report		Stadium: Anoeta; Attendance: 21,404; Referee: Javier Alberola Rojas

22 April 2018 34	Atlético Madrid	0–0	Real Betis	Madrid
20:45 CEST (UTC+02:00)	Gabi (yellow card) 90+2'; Giménez (yellow card) 90+2'	Report	Fabián (yellow card) 27'; Firpo (yellow card) 62'; Bartra (yellow card) 88'; Amat (yellow card) 90+2'; Campbell (yellow card) 90+2'	Stadium: Wanda Metropolitano; Attendance: 54,594; Referee: Juan Martínez Munuera

29 April 2018 35	Alavés	0–1	Atlético Madrid	Vitoria-Gasteiz
16:15 CEST (UTC+02:00)	Laguardia (yellow card) 17'; Pedraza (yellow card) 20'; Sobrino (yellow card) 45'; Wakaso (yellow card) 78'	Report	Hernandez (yellow card) 34'; Costa (yellow card) 45'; Gabi (yellow card) 68'; Gameiro 78' (pen.); Torres (yellow card) 90+1'; Correa (yellow card) 90+5' (red card) 90+5'	Stadium: Mendizorrotza; Attendance: 19,944; Referee: David Fernández Borbalán

6 May 2018 36	Atlético Madrid	0–2	Espanyol	Madrid
16:15 CEST (UTC+02:00)	Giménez (yellow card) 90+1'	Report	Melendo 53', (yellow card) 74'; Pau López (yellow card) 61'; Dídac (yellow card) 61'; Baptistão 77'	Stadium: Wanda Metropolitano; Attendance: 49,834; Referee: José Luis Munuera Montero

12 May 2018 37	Getafe	0–1	Atlético Madrid	Getafe
18:30 CEST (UTC+02:00)	Fajr (yellow card) 32'; Flamini (yellow card) 55'; Portillo (yellow card) 90+1'	Report	Koke 8'; Godín (yellow card) 36'; Partey (yellow card) 49'	Stadium: Coliseum Alfonso Pérez; Attendance: 12,187; Referee: Javier Alberola Rojas

20 May 2018 38	Atlético Madrid	2–2	Eibar	Madrid
18:30 CEST (UTC+02:00)	Hernandez (yellow card) 6' (yellow-red card) 63'; Filipe Luís (yellow card) 22'; Torres 42', 60', (yellow card) 61'; Costa (yellow card) 71'; Savić (yellow card) 83'	Report	Kike 35'; Dani García (yellow card) 56'; Lombán (yellow card) 65'; Rubén Peña 70'	Stadium: Wanda Metropolitano; Attendance: 63,229; Referee: Alfonso Javier Álvarez Izquierdo

=== Copa del Rey ===
==== Round of 32 ====
25 October 2017 First leg	Elche	1–1	Atlético Madrid	Elche
21:30 CET (UTC+01:00)	Lolo 52' (pen.); Verdú (yellow card) 54'; Benito (yellow card) 56'; Golobart (yellow card) 67'	Report	Partey 17'; Saúl (yellow card) 75'	Stadium: Martínez Valero; Attendance: 15,080; Referee: Xavier Estrada Fernández

29 November 2017 Second leg	Atlético Madrid	3–0 (4–1 agg.)	Elche	Madrid
21:30 CET (UTC+01:00)	Giménez 31'; Torres 33', 68'; Carrasco (yellow card) 87'	Report	Verdú (yellow card) 21'; Albácar (yellow card) 53'; Lolo (yellow card) 87'	Stadium: Wanda Metropolitano; Attendance: 46,723; Referee: David Medié Jiménez

==== Round of 16 ====
3 January 2018 First leg	Lleida Esportiu	0–4	Atlético Madrid	Lleida
19:00 CET (UTC+01:00)	Trilles (yellow card) 68' (yellow-red card) 90+1'; Rivas (yellow card) 80'	Report	Godín 33'; Torres 37'; Costa 69'; Griezmann 90+2'	Stadium: Camp d'Esports; Attendance: 12,532; Referee: Ricardo de Burgos Bengoetxea

9 January 2018 Second leg	Atlético Madrid	3–0 (7–0 agg.)	Lleida Esportiu	Madrid
19:30 CET (UTC+01:00)	Carrasco 57'; Gameiro 74'; Vitolo 81'	Report	Gning (yellow card) 59'; Cheng Hui (yellow card) 89'	Stadium: Wanda Metropolitano; Attendance: 28,033; Referee: Javier Alberola Rojas

==== Quarter-finals ====
17 January 2018 First leg	Atlético Madrid	1–2	Sevilla	Madrid
19:00 CET (UTC+01:00)	Saúl (yellow card) 69'; Costa 73'	Report	Mercado (yellow card) 58'; Navas 80'; J. Correa 88'	Stadium: Wanda Metropolitano; Attendance: 51,643; Referee: Santiago Jaime Latre

23 January 2018 Second leg	Sevilla	3–1 (5–2 agg.)	Atlético Madrid	Seville
21:30 CET (UTC+01:00)	Escudero 1'; Banega (yellow card) 27', (goal) 48' (pen.); Vázquez (yellow card) 54'; Navas (yellow card) 63'; Sarabia 79'; Mercado (yellow card) 90'	Report	Griezmann 13'; Giménez (yellow card) 18'; Gabi (yellow card) 54'; Á. Correa (yellow card) 57'; Torres (yellow card) 84'	Stadium: Ramón Sánchez Pizjuán; Attendance: 39,918; Referee: Juan Martínez Munuera

=== UEFA Champions League ===
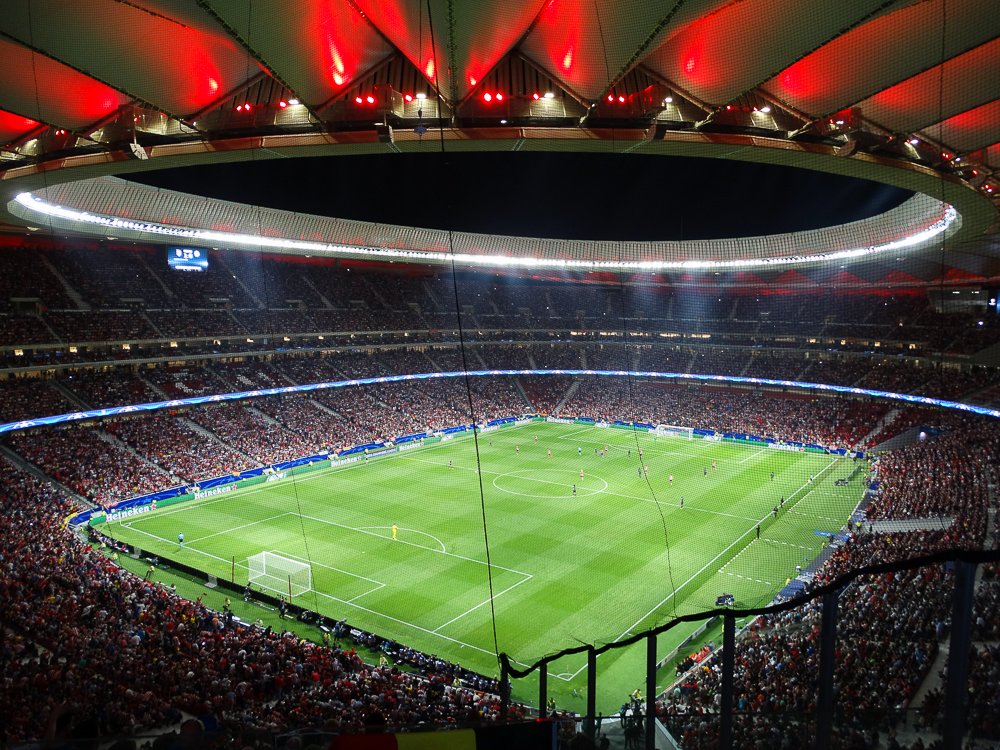
Atlético's first European match at the Metropolitano, 27 September 2017

==== Group stage ====
Pos	Team	Pld	W	D	L	GF	GA	GD	Pts	Qualification	ROM	CHE	ATM	QRB
1	(Italy) Roma	6	3	2	1	9	6	+3	11 (Note: Head-to-head results: Chelsea 3–3 Roma, Roma 3–0 Chelsea.)	Advance to knockout phase	—	3–0	0–0	1–0
2	(England) Chelsea	6	3	2	1	16	8	+8	11	Advance to knockout phase	3–3	—	1–1	6–0
3	(Spain) Atlético Madrid	6	1	4	1	5	4	+1	7	Transfer to Europa League	2–0	1–2	—	1–1
4	(Azerbaijan) Qarabağ	6	0	2	4	2	14	−12	2		1–2	0–4	0–0	—

Source: UEFA
Rules for classification: Group stage tiebreakers
Notes:

12 September 2017 1	Roma (Italy)	0–0	(Spain) Atlético Madrid	Rome, Italy
20:45 CEST (UTC+02:00)	Perotti (yellow card) 71'	Report		Stadium: Stadio Olimpico; Attendance: 36,064; Referee: Milorad Mažić (Serbia)

27 September 2017 2	Atlético Madrid (Spain)	1–2	(England) Chelsea	Madrid
20:45 CEST (UTC+02:00)	Griezmann 40' (pen.), (yellow card) 54'; Partey (yellow card) 47'	Report	David Luiz (yellow card) 39'; Morata 60'; Batshuayi 90+4'	Stadium: Wanda Metropolitano; Attendance: 60,643; Referee: Cüneyt Çakır (Turkey)

18 October 2017 3	Qarabağ (Azerbaijan)	0–0	(Spain) Atlético Madrid	Baku, Azerbaijan
18:00 CEST (UTC+02:00)	Míchel (yellow card) 53'; Ndlovu (yellow card) 59' (yellow-red card) 75'; Guseynov (yellow card) 90+4'	Report		Stadium: Tofiq Bahramov Stadium; Attendance: 47,923; Referee: Ruddy Buquet (France)

31 October 2017 4	Atlético Madrid (Spain)	1–1	(Azerbaijan) Qarabağ	Madrid
20:45 CET (UTC+01:00)	Savić (yellow card) 32' (yellow-red card) 88'; Partey 56'; Torres (yellow card) 76'	Report	Sadygov (yellow card) 9'; Rzeźniczak (yellow card) 34'; Míchel 40'; Pedro Henrique (red card) 59'	Stadium: Wanda Metropolitano; Attendance: 55,893; Referee: Deniz Aytekin (Germany)

22 November 2017 5	Atlético Madrid (Spain)	2–0	(Italy) Roma	Madrid
20:45 CET (UTC+01:00)	Filipe Luís (yellow card) 61'; Griezmann 69'; Gameiro 85'	Report	Manolas (yellow card) 7'; Peres (yellow card) 63' (yellow-red card) 83'	Stadium: Wanda Metropolitano; Attendance: 56,253; Referee: Björn Kuipers (Netherlands)

5 December 2017 6	Chelsea (England)	1–1	(Spain) Atlético Madrid	London, England
20:45 CET (UTC+01:00)	Zappacosta (yellow card) 52'; Savić 75' (o.g.)	Report	Hernandez (yellow card) 16'; Saúl 56'	Stadium: Stamford Bridge; Attendance: 40,875; Referee: Danny Makkelie (Netherlands)

=== UEFA Europa League ===
==== Knockout phase ====
===== Round of 32 =====
15 February 2018 First leg	Copenhagen (Denmark)	1–4	(Spain) Atlético Madrid	Copenhagen, Denmark
21:05 CET (UTC+01:00)	Fischer 15'; Skov (yellow card) 24'	Report	Saúl 21'; Gameiro 37'; Correa (yellow card) 44'; Griezmann 71'; Vitolo 77'	Stadium: Parken Stadium; Attendance: 34,912; Referee: Aleksei Kulbakov (Belarus)

22 February 2018 Second leg	Atlético Madrid (Spain)	1–0 (5–1 agg.)	(Denmark) Copenhagen	Madrid, Spain
19:00 CET (UTC+01:00)	Gameiro 7'	Report		Stadium: Wanda Metropolitano; Attendance: 44,035; Referee: Gediminas Mažeika (Lithuania)

===== Round of 16 =====
8 March 2018 First leg	Atlético Madrid (Spain)	3–0	(Russia) Lokomotiv Moscow	Madrid, Spain
19:00 CET (UTC+01:00)	Saúl 22', (yellow card) 84'; Costa 47'; Correa (yellow card) 66'; Koke 90'	Report	Miranchuk (yellow card) 34'	Stadium: Wanda Metropolitano; Attendance: 40,767; Referee: Jakob Kehlet (Denmark)

15 March 2018 Second leg	Lokomotiv Moscow (Russia)	1–5 (1–8 agg.)	(Spain) Atlético Madrid	Moscow, Russia
17:00 CET (UTC+01:00)	Rybus 20'	Report	Correa 16'; Saúl 47'; Torres 65' (pen.), 70'; Griezmann 85'	Stadium: RZD Arena; Attendance: 22,041; Referee: Artur Soares Dias (Portugal)

===== Quarter-finals =====
5 April 2018 First leg	Atlético Madrid (Spain)	2–0	(Portugal) Sporting CP	Madrid, Spain
21:05 CEST (UTC+02:00)	Koke 1', (yellow card) 81'; Saúl (yellow card) 25'; Griezmann 40'; Savić (yellow card) 63'	Report	Coentrão (yellow card) 56'; Piccini (yellow card) 57'; Dost (yellow card) 72'	Stadium: Wanda Metropolitano; Attendance: 53,301; Referee: Sergei Karasev (Russia)

12 April 2018 Second leg	Sporting CP (Portugal)	1–0 (1–2 agg.)	(Spain) Atlético Madrid	Lisbon, Portugal
21:05 CEST (UTC+02:00)	Montero 28', (yellow card) 66'; Ristovski (yellow card) 29'; Fernandes (yellow card) 76'; Battaglia (yellow card) 90+1'	Report	Torres (yellow card) 70'; Oblak (yellow card) 90+3'	Stadium: Estádio José Alvalade; Attendance: 28,437; Referee: Milorad Mažić (Serbia)

===== Semi-finals =====
26 April 2018 First leg	Arsenal (England)	1–1	(Spain) Atlético Madrid	London, England
21:05 CEST (UTC+02:00)	Lacazette 61'	Report	Vrsaljko (yellow card) 2' (yellow-red card) 10'; Griezmann 82'	Stadium: Emirates Stadium; Attendance: 59,066; Referee: Clément Turpin (France)

3 May 2018 Second leg	Atlético Madrid (Spain)	1–0 (2–1 agg.)	(England) Arsenal	Madrid, Spain
21:05 CEST (UTC+02:00)	Costa 45+2', (yellow card) 78'; Gabi (yellow card) 52'; Saúl (yellow card) 71'	Report	Wilshere (yellow card) 42'; Monreal (yellow card) 59'; Mustafi (yellow card) 78'	Stadium: Wanda Metropolitano; Attendance: 64,196; Referee: Gianluca Rocchi (Italy)

===== Final =====
16 May 2018 Final	Marseille (France)	0–3	(Spain) Atlético Madrid	Décines-Charpieu, France
20:45 CEST (UTC+02:00)	Amavi (yellow card) 38'; Luiz Gustavo (yellow card) 75'; N'Jie (yellow card) 78'	Report	Griezmann 21', 49'; Vrsaljko (yellow card) 23'; Hernandez (yellow card) 78'; Gabi 89'	Stadium: Parc Olympique Lyonnais; Attendance: 55,768; Referee: Björn Kuipers (Netherlands)

== Statistics ==
=== Squad statistics ===
As of match played 20 May 2018

No.	Pos.	Player	Total					La Liga					Copa del Rey					Champions League					Europa League				
No.	Pos.	Player				Yellow card	Red card				Yellow card	Red card				Yellow card	Red card				Yellow card	Red card				Yellow card	Red card
1	GK	M. Moyà	7	0	0	0	0	0	0	0	0	0	6	0	0	0	0	0	0	0	0	0	1	0	0	0	0
2	DF	Godín	43	2	1	6	0	28	2	0	6	0	3	0	1	0	0	4	0	0	0	0	8	0	0	0	0
3	DF	Filipe Luís	27	1	1	5	0	19	1	1	4	0	0	0	0	0	0	6	0	0	1	0	2	0	0	0	0
5	MF	Partey	40	10	5	7	0	28	5	3	6	0	2	1	1	0	0	5	1	1	1	0	5	3	0	0	0
6	MF	Koke	49	2	6	4	0	33	2	4	3	0	3	0	0	0	0	4	0	0	0	0	9	0	2	1	0
7	FW	Griezmann	45	4	29	8	1	30	2	19	7	1	2	1	2	0	0	6	0	2	1	0	7	1	6	0	0
8	MF	Saúl	52	4	6	14	0	35	1	2	9	0	3	2	0	2	0	6	0	1	0	0	8	1	3	3	0
9	FW	Torres	15	30	10	5	0	7	20	5	2	0	4	2	3	1	0	2	3	0	1	0	2	5	2	1	0
10	MF	Carrasco	14	14	4	4	0	8	9	3	3	0	3	2	1	1	0	3	2	0	0	0	0	1	0	0	0
11	FW	Correa	38	18	9	7	1	27	10	8	4	1	2	2	0	1	0	2	4	0	0	0	7	2	1	2	0
12	MF	Fernández	6	4	0	1	0	1	4	0	1	0	4	0	0	0	0	1	0	0	0	0	0	0	0	0	0
13	GK	Oblak	49	0	0	2	0	37	0	0	1	0	0	0	0	0	0	6	0	0	0	0	6	0	0	1	0
14	MF	Gabi	38	12	1	10	0	25	9	0	8	0	3	0	0	1	0	4	1	0	0	0	6	2	1	1	0
15	DF	Savić	34	3	0	9	1	26	1	0	6	0	3	0	0	0	0	3	0	0	2	1	2	2	0	1	0
16	DF	Vrsaljko	24	5	0	11	1	19	2	0	8	0	2	1	0	0	0	1	0	0	0	0	2	2	0	3	1
17	FW	Vietto	7	3	0	1	0	4	2	0	1	0	2	0	0	0	0	1	1	0	0	0	0	0	0	0	0
18	FW	Costa	20	3	7	7	1	13	2	3	6	1	2	1	2	0	0	-	-	-	-	-	5	0	2	1	0
19	DF	Hernandez	40	4	0	10	1	24	3	0	8	1	6	0	0	0	0	3	0	0	1	0	7	1	0	1	0
20	DF	Juanfran	27	3	0	3	0	15	2	0	3	0	3	0	0	0	0	3	0	0	0	0	6	1	0	0	0
21	FW	Gameiro	18	18	11	0	0	11	14	7	0	0	2	1	1	0	0	2	1	1	0	0	3	2	2	0	0
22	MF	Gaitán	4	9	0	0	0	1	5	0	0	0	2	0	0	0	0	1	3	0	0	0	0	1	0	0	0
23	MF	Vitolo	13	10	3	1	1	8	6	1	1	1	2	1	1	0	0	0	0	0	0	0	3	3	1	0	0
24	DF	Giménez	31	7	2	7	0	17	6	1	6	0	4	0	1	1	0	3	1	0	0	0	7	0	0	0	0
25	GK	Werner	3	0	0	0	0	1	0	0	0	0	0	0	0	0	0	0	0	0	0	0	2	0	0	0	0
27	MF	Bare^{1}	1	0	0	0	0	0	0	0	0	0	1	0	0	0	0	0	0	0	0	0	0	0	0	0	0
29	DF	Sergi^{1}	3	0	0	0	0	0	0	0	0	0	2	0	0	0	0	0	0	0	0	0	1	0	0	0	0
33	MF	A. Moya^{1}	0	2	0	0	0	0	1	0	0	0	0	1	0	0	0	0	0	0	0	0	0	0	0	0	0
37	FW	Sané^{1}	0	1	0	0	0	0	1	0	0	0	0	0	0	0	0	0	0	0	0	0	0	0	0	0	0
45	DF	Carlos Isaac^{1}	1	0	0	1	0	1	0	0	1	0	0	0	0	0	0	0	0	0	0	0	0	0	0	0	0
46	DF	Montoro^{1}	0	1	0	0	0	0	0	0	0	0	0	1	0	0	0	0	0	0	0	0	0	0	0	0	0
Own goals			–	–	1	–	–	–	–	1	–	–	–	–	0	–	–	–	–	0	–	–	–	–	0	–	–
TOTALS			–	–	96	124	7	–	–	58	95	5	–	–	13	7	0	–	–	5	7	1	–	–	20	15	1

^{1}Players from reserve team - Atlético Madrid B.

=== Goalscorers ===
As of match played 20 May 2018

Rank	No.	Pos.	Player	La Liga	Copa del Rey	Champions League	Europa League	Total
1	7	FW	(France) Antoine Griezmann	19	2	2	6	29
2	21	FW	(France) Kevin Gameiro	7	1	1	2	11
3	9	FW	(Spain) Fernando Torres	5	3	0	2	10
4	11	FW	(Argentina) Ángel Correa	8	0	0	1	9
5	18	FW	(Spain) Diego Costa	3	2	0	2	7
6	6	MF	(Spain) Koke	4	0	0	2	6
6	8	MF	(Spain) Saúl	2	0	1	3	6
8	5	MF	(Ghana) Thomas Partey	3	1	1	0	5
9	10	MF	(Belgium) Yannick Carrasco	3	1	0	0	4
10	23	FW	(Spain) Vitolo	1	1	0	1	3
11	24	DF	(Uruguay) José Giménez	1	1	0	0	2
12	2	DF	(Uruguay) Diego Godín	0	1	0	0	1
12	3	DF	(Brazil) Filipe Luís	1	0	0	0	1
12	14	MF	(Spain) Gabi	0	0	0	1	1
Own goals				1	0	0	0	1
TOTALS				58	13	5	20	96

=== Clean sheets ===
As of match played 20 May 2018

Rank	No.	Pos.	Player	Matches played	Clean sheet %	La Liga (%)	Cup (%)	Champions League (%)	Europa League (%)	Total
1	13	GK	(Slovenia) Jan Oblak	49	57%	22 (60%)	0 (0%)	2 (40%)	4 (66%)	28
2	1	GK	(Spain) Miguel Ángel Moyà	7	43%	0 (0%)	3 (50%)	0 (0%)	0 (0%)	3
3	25	GK	(Argentina) Axel Werner	3	66%	1 (100%)	0 (0%)	0 (0%)	1 (50%)	2
TOTALS				59	56%	23 (61%)	3 (50%)	2 (40%)	5 (55%)	33

=== Attendances ===
As of match played 20 May 2018

	Matches	Attendances	Average	High	Low
La Liga	17	1,055,773	62,104	66,496	35,033
Copa del Rey	3	126,399	42,133	51,643	28,033
Champions League	3	172,789	57,596	60,643	55,893
Europa League	4	202,229	50,574	64,196	40,767
Total	28	1,557,190	53,101	66,496	28,033

=== Awards ===
==== La Liga Player of the Month ====
- Antoine Griezmann named Liga Santander Player of the Month for February.
