= Miku (footballer) =

Venezuelan footballer (born 1985)

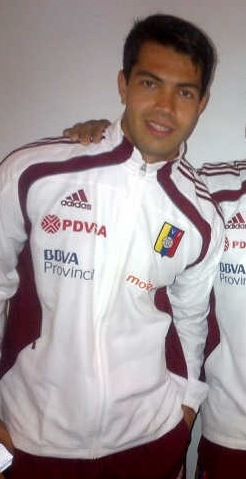
- Miku in 2013

Personal information
- Full name: Nicolás Ladislao Fedor Flores
- Date of birth: 19 August 1985 (age 41)
- Place of birth: Caracas, Venezuela
- Height: 1.85 m (6 ft 1 in)
- Position: Striker

Team information
- Current team: Metropolitanos
- Number: 7

Youth career
- 1989–2001: Santo Tomás de Villanueva
- 2001–2002: Sueca
- 2002: Valencia
- 2002–2004: Cracks

Senior career*
Years	Team	Apps	(Gls)
2004–2010	Valencia	2	(0)
2004–2005	→ Alcoyano (loan)	21	(5)
2005–2006	→ Salamanca (loan)	36	(18)
2006	→ Ciudad Murcia (loan)	8	(0)
2007	Valencia B	15	(1)
2007–2008	→ Gimnàstic (loan)	29	(2)
2008–2009	→ Salamanca (loan)	37	(15)
2010–2013	Getafe	92	(26)
2012–2013	→ Celtic (loan)	11	(2)
2013–2014	Al-Gharafa	25	(6)
2015–2017	Rayo Vallecano	43	(13)
2017–2019	Bengaluru	32	(20)
2019–2020	Omonia	9	(0)
2020–2022	Deportivo La Coruña	48	(19)
2022–2023	Murcia	15	(1)
2023	Intercity	8	(1)
2023–2024	Arenteiro	17	(5)
2024	Academia Puerto Cabello	16	(4)
2024–	Metropolitanos	72	(26)

International career
2006–2015	Venezuela	51	(11)
Medal record
Men's football
Representing Venezuela
Central American and Caribbean Games
Silver medal – second place	2006 Cartagena	Team
- * Club domestic league appearances and goals as of 13:32, 16 November 2026 (UTC)

Nicolás Ladislao Fedor Flores (born 19 August 1985), commonly known as Miku, is a Venezuelan professional footballer who plays as a striker for Metropolitanos.

He spent most of his career in Spain, having played for a host of clubs and starting with Valencia. In La Liga, he also represented Getafe and Rayo Vallecano, and won a Scottish double while on loan at Celtic in 2013.

Miku represented Venezuela in two Copa América tournaments.

== Early years ==
The son of a Hungarian father and a Venezuelan mother, Miku was born in Caracas and received his nickname after Miklós, the equivalent of his first name in the Hungarian language.

== Club career ==
=== Valencia ===
Having arrived in Valencia CF's youth system in 2002, Miku turned professional two years later, going on to serve five consecutive loans afterwards in both the second and third divisions.

On 27 August 2009, having returned to the Che after a strong season with UD Salamanca (finishing as joint-fifth in the goal charts), he scored a hat-trick in a 4–1 home win against Stabæk Fotball in the play-off round of the UEFA Europa League.

=== Getafe ===
However, clearly deemed surplus to requirements at Valencia – only third or fourth-choice striker – Miku was sold in January 2010 to Getafe CF, signing a 4 1/2-year deal. He scored on his debut, a 2–1 away victory over RCD Mallorca in the quarter-finals of the Copa del Rey, as a second-half substitute.

Benefitting from the absence of first-choice Roberto Soldado due to injury, Miku began appearing regularly as a starter. On 28 March 2010 he netted twice in a 3–1 win at Deportivo de La Coruña, adding another brace three rounds later, in a 3–0 home defeat of Villarreal CF also in La Liga.

Miku started the 2011–12 season as first choice, over veteran Dani Güiza and Adrián Colunga. He scored three goals in his first two league games, against Levante UD (1–1 home draw) and Real Madrid (4–2 away loss), and ended the campaign with 12 goals, best in the squad.

On 31 August 2012, the last day of the summer transfer window, Miku moved on loan to Celtic. He appeared in only 14 competitive matches during the season, and told Venezuelan media that he regretted his decision to join the Hoops; one highlight of his time at Celtic Park was playing the full 90 minutes as they defeated FC Barcelona 2–1 in the group stage of the UEFA Champions League.

=== Al-Gharafa ===
On 30 September 2013, Miku joined Qatar Stars League side Al-Gharafa SC for an undisclosed fee. He scored five goals in 15 games in his debut campaign, in an eventual ninth-place finish out of 14 teams.

=== Rayo ===
Miku returned to Spain on 2 February 2015, signing a two-and-a-half-year deal with Rayo Vallecano. On 12 February 2016, after contributing to a 2–2 away draw against Sporting de Gijón, he became the first Venezuelan to score in four consecutive Spanish top flight matchdays; he was named February's La Liga Player of the Month for this feat.

=== Bengaluru ===
In August 2017, 32-year-old Miku joined Indian Super League franchise Bengaluru FC on a two-year contract. He scored his first goal for them on 26 November in a 4–1 rout of Delhi Dynamos FC, adding three braces in his first season, against FC Goa in a 4–3 away defeat, FC Pune City (3–1, away) and Kerala Blasters FC (3–1, also away).

In the 2018–19 campaign, Miku and his team won the competition after a 1–0 extra time defeat of Goa in the final.

=== Later career ===
On 20 August 2019, Cypriot First Division club AC Omonia announced the signing of Miku for one year. He returned to Spain on 25 September 2020, after agreeing to a contract with Deportivo La Coruña, recently relegated to the third tier.

In 2021–22, Miku scored 12 goals for Dépor in the new Primera Federación, while they missed out on promotion after a 2–1 home loss to Albacete Balompié in the playoff final. Having not been offered a new contract, he subsequently joined Real Murcia CF in the same league. On 3 February 2023, he switched again to CF Intercity, where within two minutes of his debut against Real Unión he was taken off with facial injuries.

Miku remained in the Spanish third division in the 2023–24 season, on a deal at CD Arenteiro. The 38-year-old returned to Venezuela in January 2024 after two decades away, joining Primera División side Academia Puerto Cabello.

== International career ==
Miku made his debut with Venezuela on 16 August 2006, in a 0–0 friendly with Honduras. Later, he was an important member of the squads that competed in the 2010 FIFA World Cup qualifiers, scoring in a 2–0 home victory against Colombia on 31 March 2009.

On 9 September 2009, Miku netted twice in a 3–1 home win over Peru; this brought Venezuela closer to its first-ever FIFA World Cup qualification, which eventually did not happen. He represented the nation at the 2011 Copa América, scoring in a 3–3 draw against Paraguay, helping his team to second place in the group stage and an eventual fourth-place finish.

Four years later, in the next edition of the competition in Chile, Miku scored an 84th-minute goal in a 2–1 defeat to Brazil; a win would have sent his country through, but instead they were eliminated in last place in their group. Later that year, he was among 15 national players who threatened to quit the team after the president of the Venezuelan Football Federation accused them of conspiring to get the manager sacked.

== Career statistics ==
=== Club ===
As of match played on 21 September 2026

Appearances and goals by club, season and competition
Club	Season	League			Cup (Note: Includes Copa del Rey, AIFF Super Cup, Cypriot Cup and Copa Venezuela)		Continental		Other		Total	
Club	Season	Division	Apps	Goals	Apps	Goals	Apps	Goals	Apps	Goals	Apps	Goals
Alcoyano (loan)	2004–05	Segunda División B	21	5	0	0	—		—		21	5
Salamanca (loan)	2005–06	Segunda División B	36	18	1	0	—		4 (Note: Appearances in Segunda División B play-offs)	2	41	20
Ciudad Murcia (loan)	2006–07	Segunda División	8	0	1	0	—		—		9	0
Valencia B	2006–07	Segunda División B	15	1	0	0	—		—		15	1
Gimnàstic (loan)	2007–08	Segunda División	29	2	1	0	—		—		30	2
Salamanca (loan)	2008–09	Segunda División	37	15	2	1	—		—		39	16
Valencia	2009–10	La Liga	2	0	2	0	3 (Note: Appearances in UEFA Europa League)	3	—		7	3
Getafe	2009–10	La Liga	16	5	4	1	—		—		20	6
Getafe	2010–11	La Liga	31	7	3	1	7	0	—		41	8
Getafe	2011–12	La Liga	38	12	2	0	—		—		40	12
Getafe	2012–13	La Liga	2	0	0	0	—		—		2	0
Getafe	2013–14	La Liga	5	2	0	0	—		—		5	2
Getafe	Total		92	26	9	2	7	0	—		108	28
Celtic (loan)	2012–13	Scottish Premier League	11	2	1	0	2 (Note: Appearances in UEFA Champions League)	0	—		14	2
Al-Gharafa	2013–14	Qatar Stars League	15	5	0	0	—		—		15	5
Al-Gharafa	2014–15	Qatar Stars League	10	1	0	0	—		—		10	1
Al-Gharafa	Total		25	6	0	0	—		—		25	6
Rayo Vallecano	2014–15	La Liga	7	2	0	0	—		—		7	2
Rayo Vallecano	2015–16	La Liga	22	9	2	0	—		—		24	9
Rayo Vallecano	2016–17	Segunda División	14	2	1	0	—		—		15	2
Rayo Vallecano	Total		43	13	3	0	—		—		46	13
Bengaluru	2017–18	Indian Super League	20	15	4	5	2 (Note: Appearances in AFC Champions League)	0	—		26	20
Bengaluru	2018–19	Indian Super League	12	5	1	0	—		—		13	5
Bengaluru	Total		32	20	5	5	2	0	—		39	25
Omonia	2019–20	Cypriot First Division	9	0	4	3	—		—		13	3
Deportivo La Coruña	2020–21	Segunda División B	16	7	1	0	—		—		17	7
Deportivo La Coruña	2021–22	Primera Federación	32	12	1	0	—		2 (Note: Appearances in Primera Federación play-offs)	0	35	12
Deportivo La Coruña	Total		48	19	2	0	—		2	0	52	15
Murcia	2022–23	Primera Federación	15	1	1	0	—		—		16	1
Intercity	2022–23	Primera Federación	8	1	0	0	—		—		8	1
Arenteiro	2023–24	Primera Federación	17	5	1	0	—		—		18	5
Academia Puerto Cabello	2024	Liga FUTVE	16	4	0	0	4 (Note: Appearances in Copa Libertadores)	1	—		20	5
Metropolitanos	2024	Liga FUTVE	13	3	2	1	—		—		15	4
Metropolitanos	2025	Liga FUTVE	25	8	1	0	1 (Note: Appearance in Copa Sudamericana)	0	—		27	8
Metropolitanos	2026	Liga FUTVE	28	14	0	0	1	0	—		29	14
Metropolitanos	Total		66	25	3	1	2	0	—		71	26
Career total			530	163	36	12	20	3	6	2	592	180

=== International ===
Appearances and goals by national team and year
National team	Year	Apps	Goals
Venezuela	2006	3	0
Venezuela	2007	7 (Note: Includes one non-FIFA match)	2
Venezuela	2009	6	3
Venezuela	2010	4	1
Venezuela	2011	14	3
Venezuela	2012	7	1
Venezuela	2013	3	0
Venezuela	2014	4	0
Venezuela	2015	3	1
Total		51	11

Scores and results list Venezuela's goal tally first, score column indicates score after each Miku goal.

List of international goals scored by Miku
No.	Date	Venue	Opponent	Score	Result	Competition
1	24 March 2007	José Pachencho Romero, Maracaibo, Venezuela	New Zealand	4–0	5–0	Friendly
2	27 August 2007	Antonio Oddone Sarubbi, Ciudad del Este, Paraguay	Paraguay	1–1	1–1	Friendly
3	3 March 2009	Polideportivo Cachamay, Puerto Ordaz, Venezuela	Colombia	1–0	2–0	2010 World Cup qualification
4	9 September 2009	José Antonio Anzoátegui, Puerto La Cruz, Venezuela	Peru	1–0	3–1	2010 World Cup qualification
5	9 September 2009	José Antonio Anzoátegui, Puerto La Cruz, Venezuela	Peru	2–1	3–1	2010 World Cup qualification
6	8 September 2010	Metropolitano de Lara, Barquisimeto, Venezuela	Ecuador	1–0	1–0	Friendly
7	25 March 2011	Sports Complex, Montego Bay, Jamaica	Jamaica	1–0	2–0	Friendly
8	1 June 2011	Mateo Flores, Guatemala City, Guatemala	Guatemala	1–0	2–0	Friendly
9	13 July 2011	Padre Ernesto Martearena, Salta, Argentina	Paraguay	2–3	3–3	2011 Copa América
10	15 August 2012	Sapporo Dome, Sapporo, Japan	Japan	1–1	1–1	Friendly
11	22 June 2015	Monumental David Arellano, Santiago, Chile	Brazil	1–2	1–2	2015 Copa América

== Honours ==
Celtic

- Scottish Premier League: 2012–13
- Scottish Cup: 2012–13

Bengaluru

- Indian Super League: 2018–19
- AIFF Super Cup: 2018

Individual

- La Liga Player of the Month: February 2016
