= Miguel Ángel Moyá =

Spanish footballer

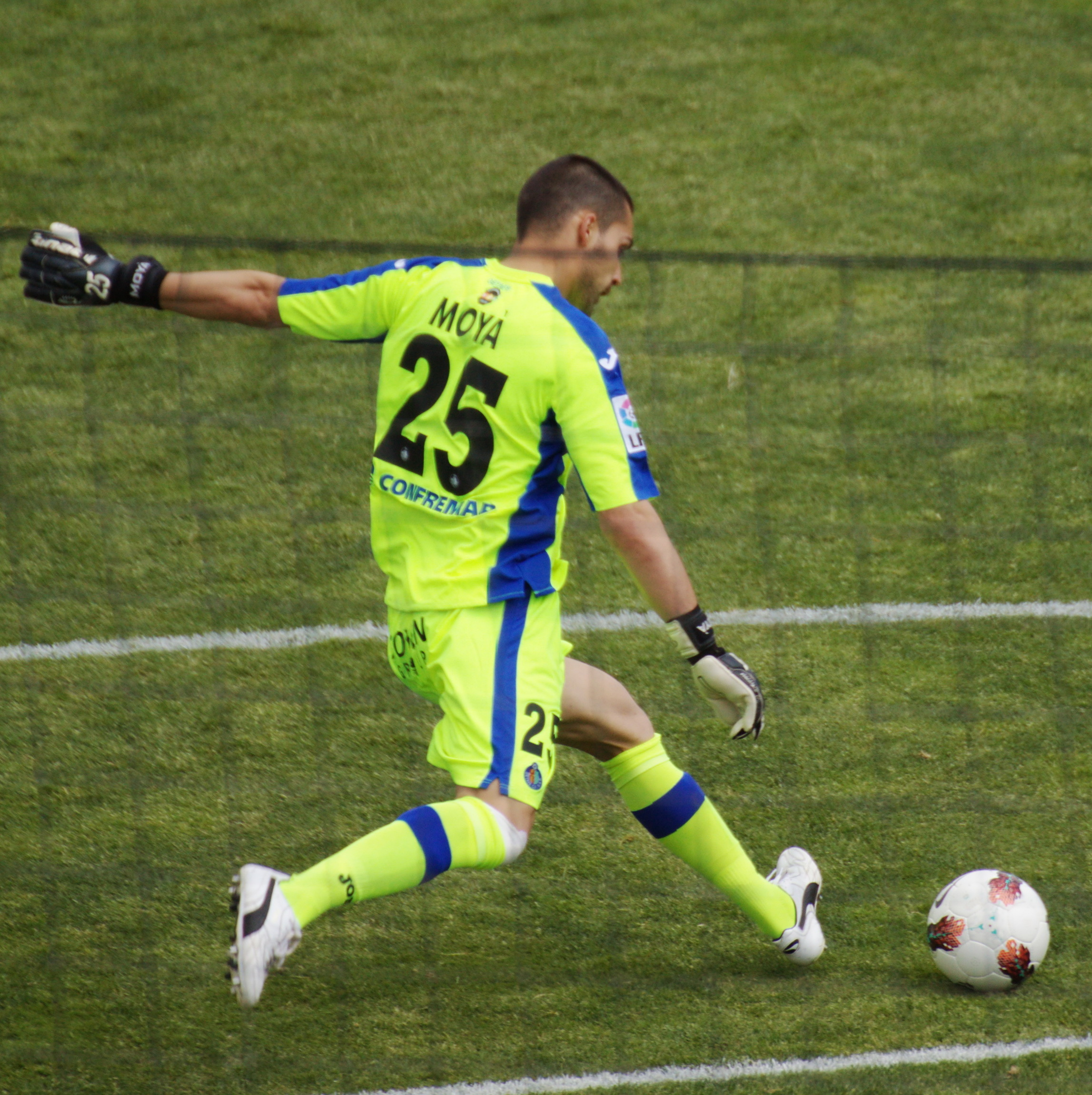
- Moyá taking a free kick for Getafe in 2012

Personal information
- Full name: Miguel Ángel Moyá Rumbo
- Date of birth: 2 April 1984 (age 42)
- Place of birth: Binissalem, Spain
- Height: 1.88 m (6 ft 2 in)
- Position: Goalkeeper

Youth career
- Mallorca

Senior career*
Years	Team	Apps	(Gls)
2002–2004	Mallorca B	58	(0)
2004–2009	Mallorca	99	(0)
2009–2012	Valencia	12	(0)
2011–2012	→ Getafe (loan)	36	(0)
2012–2014	Getafe	58	(0)
2014–2018	Atlético Madrid	36	(0)
2018–2021	Real Sociedad	33	(0)
Total		332	(0)

International career
2000–2001	Spain U16	7	(0)
2001	Spain U17	4	(0)
2001–2003	Spain U19	11	(0)
2003	Spain U20	4	(0)
2004–2006	Spain U21	12	(0)
Medal record
Men's Football
Representing Spain
UEFA European Under-16 Championship
Winner	2001 England
- * Club domestic league appearances and goals

Miguel Ángel Moyá Rumbo (Spanish pronunciation: [miˈɣel ˈaŋxel moˈʝa ˈrumbo]; born 2 April 1984) is a Spanish former professional footballer who played as a goalkeeper.

He played 274 La Liga games over 15 seasons, representing in the competition Mallorca, Valencia, Getafe, Atlético Madrid and Real Sociedad.

At youth level, Moyá earned 38 caps for Spain.

== Club career ==
=== Mallorca ===
Born in Binissalem, Mallorca, Moyá made his professional debut with hometown RCD Mallorca on 29 August 2004 in a 1–0 home loss against Real Madrid, appearing in 32 La Liga games for a team that barely avoided relegation (17th). After backing up another youth system product, veteran Toni Prats, for two years, he became the undisputed starter.

From 2007 to 2009, however, Moyá struggled mightily with injuries, only appearing in 13 matches for the Balearic Islands side in the latter season.

=== Valencia ===
In late June 2009, Moyá agreed on a move to fellow top-division club Valencia CF for about €5 million. On 5 August, in a 2–0 preseason defeat at Manchester United, he featured more than 30 minutes as central midfielder after all the replacements had been made by Unai Emery and an injury occurred; the score was then at 1–0.

Moyá made his official debut against Sevilla FC in the league's opener, a 2–0 home win, but quickly lost his job to veteran César Sánchez after some costly mistakes.

=== Getafe ===
On 15 June 2011, Moyá joined Getafe CF on loan as part of the deal involving Dani Parejo. At the end of the campaign, in which he only missed two league games as the Madrid outskirts team again retained their status, he signed a permanent four-year contract.

Moyá suffered a knee injury in March 2014 during a game against RCD Espanyol, being ruled out for the remainder of the season.

=== Atlético Madrid ===
On 4 June 2014, Moyá signed a three-year contract with league champions Atlético Madrid, for a reported fee of €3 million. During his presentation on the following day, he said: "What better moment than this one to arrive, the demands will be strong but when a football player is born, he wishes to be in a club such as this one. Atlético de Madrid is one of Europe's greatest teams and has clearly demonstrated it".

Moyá made his competitive debut in the first leg of the 2014 Supercopa de España on 19 August, a 1–1 draw at Real Madrid. He remained a starter until the final stretch of the season but, after suffering an injury to his left thigh in a UEFA Champions League game against Bayer 04 Leverkusen, he lost his position to Jan Oblak, going on to be restricted to Copa del Rey matches throughout the next three seasons.

=== Real Sociedad ===
On 27 February 2018, Moyá was released from his contract with Atlético and joined Real Sociedad on a two-year deal as an emergency signing following the injury of Gerónimo Rulli. Though mainly a backup for Álex Remiro in 2019–20, he played the last few games as the team from San Sebastián qualified for the UEFA Europa League, and was rewarded with a new one-year deal in August.

After retiring, Moyá worked as a football commentator and analyst for Movistar+, contributing to their coverage of La Liga and other competitions.

== International career ==
A Spain under-21 international, Moyá participated in the qualification stage for the 2007 UEFA European Championship, lost on aggregate to Italy in the play-off round.

== Personal life ==
In February 2026, Moyá confirmed his relationship with athlete Fátima Diame, sharing several photos on social media.

== Career statistics ==
Appearances and goals by club, season and competition
Club	Season	League			Cup		Europe		Other		Total	
Club	Season	Division	Apps	Goals	Apps	Goals	Apps	Goals	Apps	Goals	Apps	Goals
Mallorca B	2001–02	Segunda División B	4	0	—		—		—		4	0
Mallorca B	2002–03	Segunda División B	25	0	—		—		—		25	0
Mallorca B	2003–04	Segunda División B	29	0	—		—		—		29	0
Mallorca B	Total		58	0	—		—		—		58	0
Mallorca	2002–03	La Liga	0	0	0	0	—		—		0	0
Mallorca	2003–04	La Liga	0	0	0	0	0	0	—		0	0
Mallorca	2004–05	La Liga	32	0	0	0	—		—		32	0
Mallorca	2005–06	La Liga	9	0	1	0	—		—		10	0
Mallorca	2006–07	La Liga	16	0	4	0	—		—		20	0
Mallorca	2007–08	La Liga	29	0	2	0	—		—		31	0
Mallorca	2008–09	La Liga	13	0	1	0	—		—		14	0
Mallorca	Total		99	0	8	0	—		—		107	0
Valencia	2009–10	La Liga	8	0	4	0	6 (Note: Appearances in UEFA Europa League)	0	—		18	0
Valencia	2010–11	La Liga	4	0	1	0	1 (Note: Appearances in UEFA Champions League)	0	—		6	0
Valencia	Total		12	0	5	0	7	0	—		24	0
Getafe (loan)	2011–12	La Liga	36	0	0	0	—		—		36	0
Getafe	2012–13	La Liga	32	0	2	0	—		—		34	0
Getafe	2013–14	La Liga	26	0	0	0	—		—		26	0
Getafe	Getafe total		94	0	2	0	—		—		96	0
Atlético Madrid	2014–15	La Liga	27	0	0	0	7	0	2 (Note: Appearances in Supercopa de España)	0	36	0
Atlético Madrid	2015–16	La Liga	0	0	6	0	0	0	—		6	0
Atlético Madrid	2016–17	La Liga	9	0	8	0	1	0	—		18	0
Atlético Madrid	2017–18	La Liga	0	0	6	0	1	0	—		7	0
Atlético Madrid	Total		36	0	20	0	9	0	2	0	67	0
Real Sociedad	2017–18	La Liga	9	0	—		—		—		9	0
Real Sociedad	2018–19	La Liga	11	0	2	0	—		—		13	0
Real Sociedad	2019–20	La Liga	13	0	1	0	—		—		14	0
Real Sociedad	2020–21	La Liga	0	0	0	0	1	0	0	0	1	0
Real Sociedad	Total		33	0	3	0	1	0	0	0	37	0
Career total			332	0	38	0	17	0	2	0	389	0

== Honours ==
Atlético Madrid

- Supercopa de España: 2014
- UEFA Europa League: 2017–18
- UEFA Champions League runner-up: 2015–16

Real Sociedad

- Copa del Rey: 2019–20

Spain U16

- UEFA European Under-16 Championship: 2001

Spain U19

- UEFA European Under-19 Championship: 2002

Spain U20

- FIFA U-20 World Cup runner-up: 2003
