= Rafa (footballer, born 1985) =

Spanish footballer

Personal information
- Full name: Rafael López Gómez
- Date of birth: 9 April 1985 (age 41)
- Place of birth: Peñafiel, Spain
- Height: 1.79 m (5 ft 10 in)
- Position: Defender

Youth career
- Valladolid

Senior career*
Years	Team	Apps	(Gls)
2003–2006	Valladolid B		
2004–2008	Valladolid	40	(0)
2006	→ Eibar (loan)	19	(0)
2008–2014	Getafe	122	(3)
2014–2016	Paderborn	17	(0)
2016–2017	Valladolid	19	(0)
2017–2018	Pune City	20	(0)
2018–2019	Rayo Majadahonda	20	(0)
2019–2020	Hyderabad	6	(0)
Total		263	(3)
- * Club domestic league appearances and goals

Rafael López Gómez (Spanish pronunciation: [rafaˈel ˈlopeθ ˈɣomeθ]; born 9 April 1985), known as Rafa, is a Spanish former professional footballer who played mainly as a central defender.

== Club career ==
Rafa was born in Peñafiel, Province of Valladolid, Castile and León. A product of Real Valladolid's youth system, he made his debut with the first team on 8 February 2004 in a 2–0 away defeat against RCD Espanyol, but only managed six appearances with the main squad over his first two professional seasons.

After a five-month loan at SD Eibar in the Segunda División, Rafa returned to help Valladolid to regain their La Liga status in 2007. He played 21 league matches the following campaign.

Rafa agreed to join Getafe CF on a Bosman transfer in early July 2008. He would spend most of his first year as left-back, replacing out-of-form Lucas Licht who was sold shortly after.

In 2009–10, benefitting from consecutive injuries to Mario, Rafa was mostly first-choice. With 27 games and two goals from the player, the Madrid team finished sixth and qualified for the UEFA Europa League for the second time in their history.

On 1 September 2014, the last open day of the transfer window, Rafa transferred to newly-promoted SC Paderborn 07, signing a two-year contract. He made his Bundesliga debut on 22 November, playing the full 90 minutes in a 2–2 home draw against Borussia Dortmund.

Rafa returned to his first club Valladolid on 13 July 2016, after agreeing to a three-year deal. In June 2017, however, he left.

On 23 August 2017, the 32-year-old Rafa signed for Indian Super League franchise FC Pune City. He returned to Spain and its second division the following 7 July, joining CF Rayo Majadahonda on a one-year contract.

== Career statistics ==
As of match played on 11 March 2018

Club	Season	League			Cup		Other		Total	
Club	Season	Division	Apps	Goals	Apps	Goals	Apps	Goals	Apps	Goals
Valladolid	2003–04	La Liga	3	0	0	0	—		3	0
Valladolid	2004–05	Segunda División	3	0	3	0	—		6	0
Valladolid	2005–06	Segunda División	0	0	1	0	—		1	0
Valladolid	2006–07	Segunda División	13	0	6	0	—		19	0
Valladolid	2007–08	La Liga	21	0	1	0	—		22	0
Valladolid	Total		40	0	11	0	—		51	0
Eibar (loan)	2005–06	Segunda División	19	0	0	0	—		19	0
Getafe	2008–09	La Liga	14	0	2	0	—		16	0
Getafe	2009–10	La Liga	27	2	7	1	—		34	3
Getafe	2010–11	La Liga	19	0	2	0	3 (Note: Appearances in UEFA Europa League)	0	24	0
Getafe	2011–12	La Liga	13	0	1	0	—		14	0
Getafe	2012–13	La Liga	19	1	2	0	—		21	1
Getafe	2013–14	La Liga	29	0	3	0	—		32	0
Getafe	2014–15	La Liga	1	0	0	0	—		1	0
Getafe	Total		122	3	17	1	3	0	142	4
Paderborn	2014–15	Bundesliga	16	0	0	0	—		16	0
Paderborn	2015–16	2. Bundesliga	1	0	0	0	—		1	0
Paderborn	Total		17	0	0	0	—		17	0
Valladolid	2016–17	Segunda División	19	0	1	0	—		20	0
Pune City	2017–18	Indian Super League	20	0	0	0	—		20	0
Career total			237	3	29	1	3	0	269	4

== Honours ==
Valladolid

- Segunda División: 2006–07
