= Alberto Lopo =

Spanish former professional footballer (born 1980)

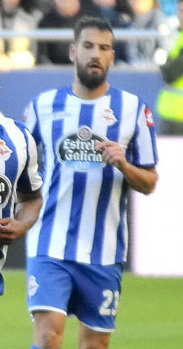
- Lopo with Deportivo in 2015

Personal information
- Full name: Alberto Lopo García
- Date of birth: 5 May 1980 (age 46)
- Place of birth: Barcelona, Spain
- Height: 1.86 m (6 ft 1 in)
- Position: Centre-back

Youth career
- 1990–1998: Espanyol

Senior career*
| Years | Team | Apps | (Gls) |
| 1998–2001 | Espanyol B | 44 | (1) |
| 1999–2006 | Espanyol | 178 | (9) |
| 2006–2011 | Deportivo La Coruña | 151 | (7) |
| 2011–2014 | Getafe | 40 | (1) |
| 2014–2016 | Deportivo La Coruña | 56 | (4) |
| 2016 | Gimnàstic | 5 | (0) |
| 2018 | Inter d'Escaldes | 4 | (0) |
| Total | | 478 | (22) |

International career
| 1998 | Spain U17 | 4 | (0) |
| 1998–1999 | Spain U18 | 7 | (0) |
| 2001 | Spain U21 | 4 | (0) |
- * Club domestic league appearances and goals

Alberto Lopo García (born 5 May 1980) is a Spanish former professional footballer who played as a central defender.

His physical style of play resulted in him being one of the most booked players every season in Spanish football. He spent 16 years of his career – youth years accounted for – at Espanyol, winning the Copa del Rey twice.

Over 18 seasons, Lopo amassed La Liga totals of 409 matches and 19 goals, also representing in the competition Deportivo and Getafe.

== Club career ==
=== Espanyol ===
Born in Barcelona, Catalonia, Lopo spent the bulk of his professional career at local RCD Espanyol, whose youth system he joined when he was 10. He made his La Liga debut on 11 April 1999 when he played injury time against Real Zaragoza at the age of 18, thus becoming the first player to have represented the club in all categories. His breakthrough came in the 2001–02 season when he only missed five league matches and scored his first goal, in the first league round and against Zaragoza, but also received his first red card during a 2–0 away loss to city rivals FC Barcelona.

Lopo would remain a starter under several managers – Juande Ramos, Javier Clemente, Luis Fernández and Miguel Ángel Lotina – until his departure, earning in the process a reputation as a superb but excessively rough defender. In 2002–03 he was booked 13 times in 23 games, including two in a 5–2 defeat at Racing de Santander. The following campaign, after agreeing to a three-year extension, he was presented with 14 yellow cards and four red. Between 2004 and 2006 he received another 21 yellow cards and two red, although the numbers somewhat decreased in the subsequent years.

With two Copa del Rey trophies conquered, in 2000 and 2006, Lopo rejected an offer for a new deal and signed for Deportivo de La Coruña. But although he was out of contract, Espanyol eventually started a court case to get financial compensation (an amount of €5.6 million was mentioned) for having educated the player in its youth system.

=== Deportivo ===
In his first season, Lopo continued as always, playing 31 times and receiving a total of 11 yellow cards (this included a double one at home against RC Celta de Vigo; he was also sent off in the cup with Real Valladolid). He initially formed a stopper partnership with Álvaro Arbeloa but, after the latter was sold to Liverpool, it was Jorge Andrade who accompanied him at the back: that defence, with Capdevila and Fabrizio Coloccini at the sides and Dudu Aouate as goalkeeper, kept 16 clean sheets in 38 matches, and many of the points won were based on the defensive performance of a team not capable of scoring sufficient goals. In late April 2007, his injury-time header provided a much needed 1–0 home win over CA Osasuna.

Lopo's status at the club increased significantly in the summer of 2007, as Juanma and Andrade both left the Estadio Riazor, the former on a free transfer to CD Tenerife whereas the latter was sold to Juventus FC – he himself confirmed that Deportivo rejected a €5 million offer from Real Zaragoza for him. However, he would spend the first five months out of action, due to a recurrent leg injury.

Ever-present throughout 2008–09, Lopo headed in the 2–1 home winner in the league opener against Real Madrid. During the campaign, as his side finished seventh, he collected 13 yellow cards.

=== Later career ===
Lopo continued to be an undisputed starter for Depor in the following two seasons, with relegation befalling in 2010–11. In late June, the 31-year-old free agent signed a three-year contract with Getafe CF.

Lopo was played regularly in the first part of the 2011–12 campaign. He missed several months, however, after fracturing his humerus during a game against his former club Espanyol.

On 29 January 2014, Lopo returned to Deportivo after cutting ties with the Madrid outskirts team. He achieved top-flight promotion in June, contributing two goals from 16 appearances.

On 15 August 2016, aged 36, Lopo agreed to a one-year deal with second-tier Gimnàstic de Tarragona. On 19 January 2018, after more than one year of inactivity, he joined Inter Club d'Escaldes of Andorra's Primera Divisió.

== International career ==
In early November 2006, Lopo was picked by Spain coach Luis Aragonés for a friendly with Romania, and said about it: "Every player has to fight hard for his pick and to be part of the national team is a reward. This is probably the most important day in my career, it's a dream coming true". In the end, he did not play during the 1–0 loss nor was he picked again for the national side.

Lopo made his debut for the regional team of Catalonia on 28 December 2001, against Chile.

== Honours ==
Espanyol

- Copa del Rey: 1999–2000, 2005–06

== See also ==
- List of La Liga players (400+ appearances)
