= Medhi Lacen =

Algerian footballer (born 1984)

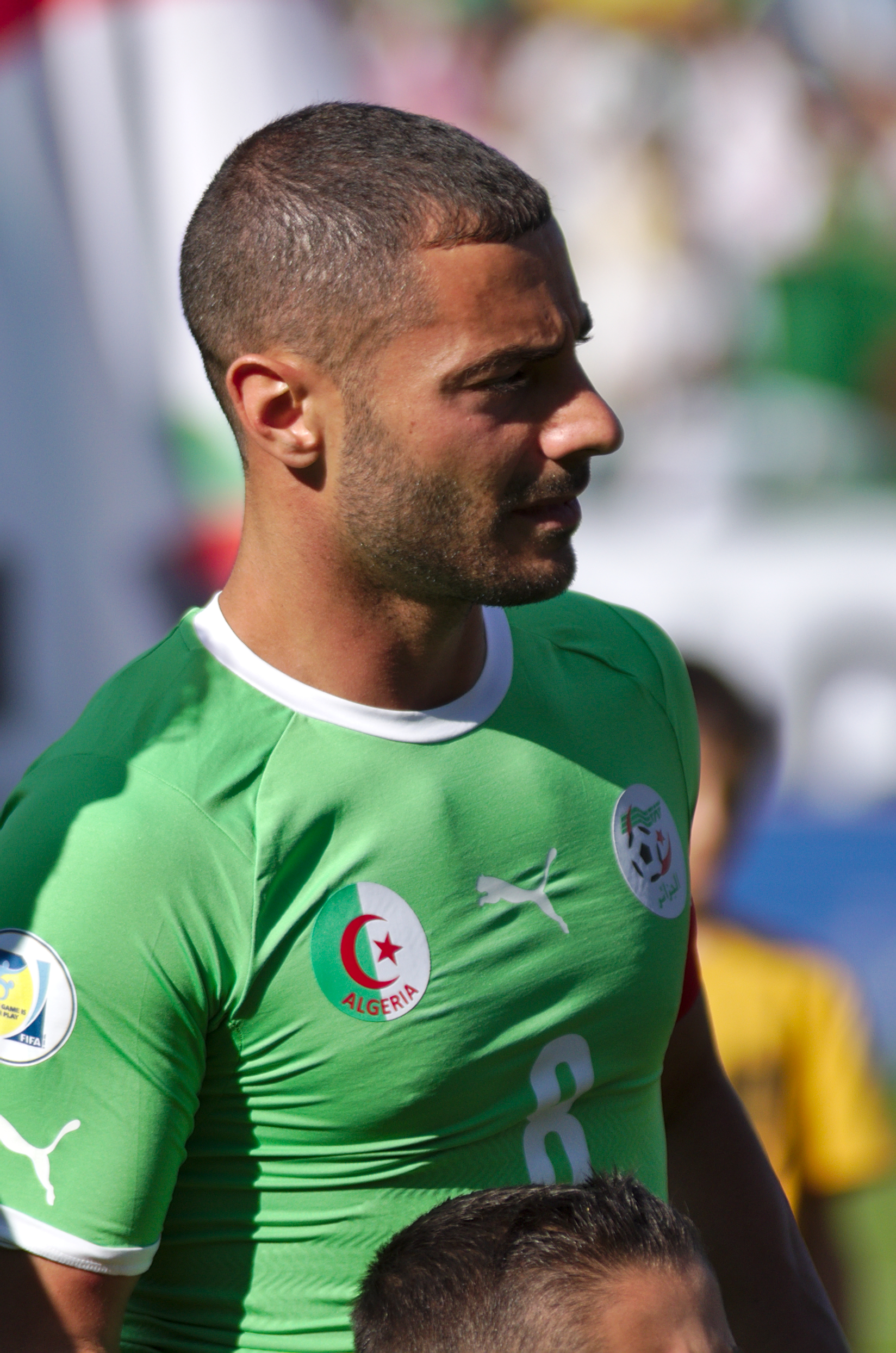
- Lacen with Algeria in 2014

Personal information
- Full name: Medhi Gregory Giuseppe Lacen
- Date of birth: 15 March 1984 (age 42)
- Place of birth: Versailles, France
- Height: 1.75 m (5 ft 9 in)
- Position: Defensive midfielder

Youth career
- -2000: Versailles
- 2000-2002: Laval

Senior career*
Years	Team	Apps	(Gls)
2002–2004	Laval B	62	(1)
2003–2004	Laval	4	(0)
2004–2005	Valence	35	(0)
2005–2008	Alavés	86	(0)
2006	Alavés B	2	(0)
2008–2011	Racing Santander	100	(4)
2011–2018	Getafe	178	(4)
2018–2019	Málaga	29	(0)
Total		434	(8)

International career
2010–2015	Algeria	43	(0)
- * Club domestic league appearances and goals

Medhi Gregory Giuseppe Lacen (Arabic: مهدي لحسن; born 15 March 1984) is a retired professional footballer who played as a defensive midfielder.

After starting out at Laval, he spent most of his professional career in Spain, representing Alavés, Racing de Santander, Getafe and Málaga and amassing La Liga totals of 273 matches and seven goals over ten seasons.

Born in France, Lacen appeared for Algeria in two World Cups.

== Club career ==
Born in Versailles, France, to an Algerian father and an Italian mother, Lacen started his professional career with modest Stade Lavallois and ASOA Valence. For the 2005–06 season he moved to Spain, joining Deportivo Alavés which would eventually be relegated; he made his La Liga debut on 15 October 2005, in a 1–1 home draw against Villarreal CF.

After two second division campaigns as an undisputed starter for the Basques, Lacen moved to Racing de Santander on 15 August 2008, on a three-year contract. He competed throughout the campaign for first-choice status with Peter Luccin, also newly signed.

In 2009–10, as Racing finished in 16th position, Lacen became an automatic first-choice (Luccin returned to Real Zaragoza from his loan). He scored three goals, including in a 3–2 home win over Xerez CD on 13 December 2009.

In late February 2011, with his link to the Cantabrians expiring in June, Lacen signed a pre-contract with fellow top-level side Getafe CF. The move was made official on 25 May, with the player agreeing to a four-year deal with the Madrid outskirts club.

Lacen scored his first goal with Getafe on 16 April 2012, netting the second in a 5–1 home defeat of Sevilla FC. He was released from his contract on 31 January 2018 after appearing in 187 competitive matches and, three days later, joined Málaga CF until 30 June.

== International career ==
Although French-born, Lacen had the possibility of representing Algeria through his fathers' origins. In 2006, he was called up by Jean-Michel Cavalli to the national side for a friendly against Gabon, but did not play because of an administrative problem.

On 12 December 2009, the president of the Algerian FA, Mohamed Raouraoua, announced that Lacen would be called up to the Algerian squad for the 2010 Africa Cup of Nations in Angola. However, five days later, head coach Rabah Saâdane announced that the player would not participate in the continental competition because of his wife's pregnancy.

On 12 February 2010, Racing Santander's website announced that Lacen was chosen for Algeria's upcoming friendly against Serbia. On 3 March he finally made his debut, in a 0–3 loss.

In June 2010, Lacen was selected to the FIFA World Cup in South Africa, playing all the games. During the tournament, he partnered Hassan Yebda (another defensive midfielder) as the national team failed to score a goal, earning one point.

== Personal life ==
Lacen's younger brother, Michael, was also a footballer. He represented, amongst other clubs, FC Versailles 78.
