= Juan Valera (footballer) =

Spanish footballer (born 1984)

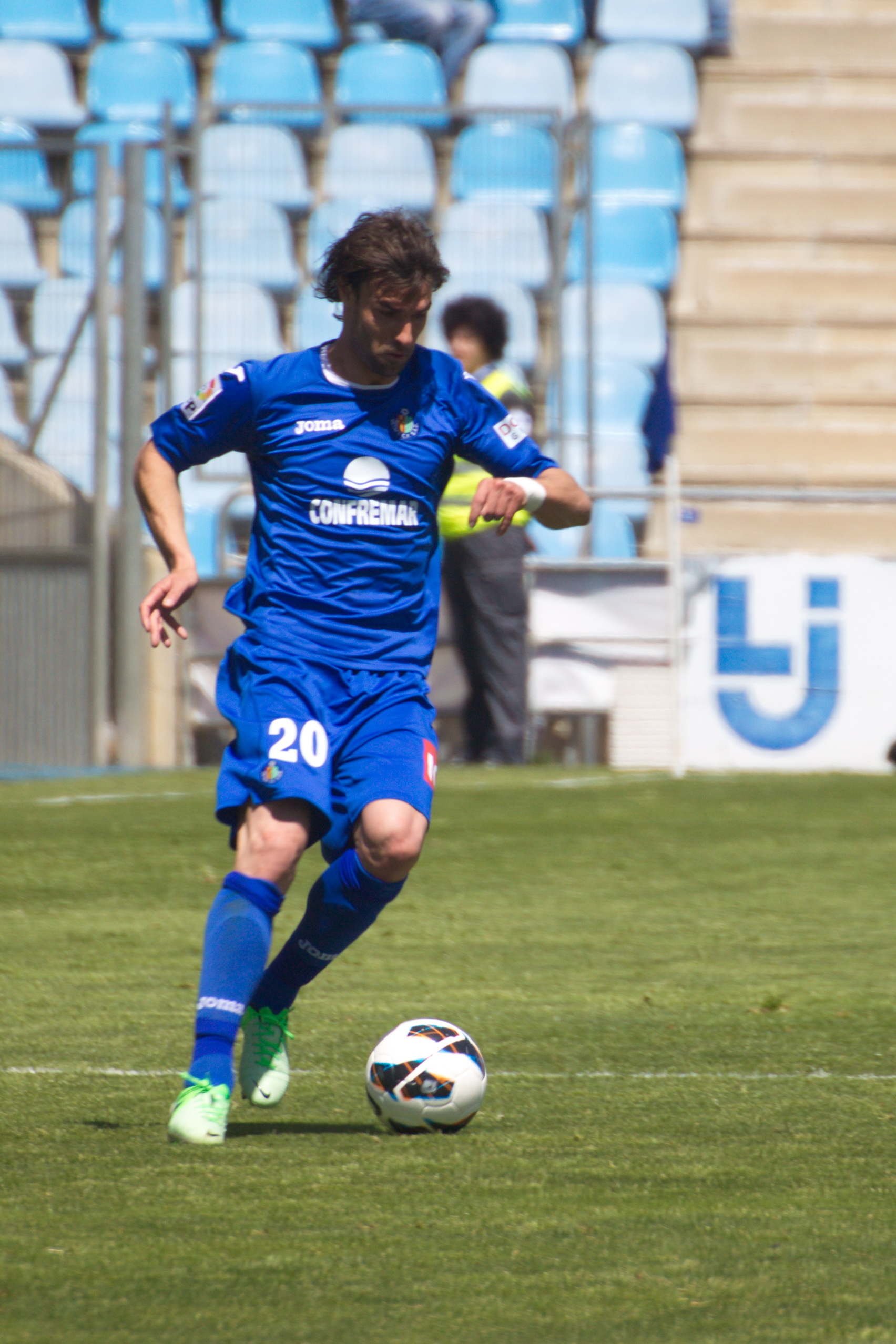
- Valera playing with Getafe in 2013

Personal information
- Full name: Juan Valera Espín
- Date of birth: 21 December 1984 (age 41)
- Place of birth: Murcia, Spain
- Height: 1.84 m (6 ft 0 in)
- Positions: Right-back; midfielder

Youth career
- 2000–2002: Bullense

Senior career*
Years	Team	Apps	(Gls)
2002–2004	Murcia B	36	(9)
2003–2005	Murcia	48	(3)
2005–2011	Atlético Madrid	71	(3)
2008–2009	→ Racing Santander (loan)	25	(2)
2011–2015	Getafe	94	(3)
Total		274	(20)

International career
2006	Spain U21	1	(1)
2005	Spain U23	5	(1)
- * Club domestic league appearances and goals

Juan Valera Espín (born 21 December 1984) is a Spanish former professional footballer. He operated as a right-back or right midfielder.

He amassed La Liga totals of 200 matches and eight goals over 11 seasons, representing in the competition Murcia, Atlético Madrid, Racing de Santander and Getafe.

== Club career ==
Born in Murcia, Valera made his professional debut at hometown's Real Murcia, and first played in La Liga in 2003–04, appearing in ten games during the season. For 2005–06, he moved to Atlético Madrid on a three-year deal, where his progression was marred by injuries. On 25 February 2006, he scored twice as a substitute in a 5–0 home win against Málaga.

Valera agreed to a one-year loan at Racing de Santander on 1 September 2008. He scored his first goal for the Cantabrians on 5 October, in a 1–0 last-minute away victory over Osasuna. He also found the net in December, but in an insufficient 3–1 UEFA Cup group-stage defeat of Manchester City.

Recalled for 2009–10, Valera also suffered initially with physical problems. However, he would manage to feature regularly over the course of the campaign – 36 competitive appearances – mainly as a right-back, competing with internationals Luis Perea and Tomáš Ujfaluši for the position. He contributed seven matches in the Colchoneros' Europa League victorious run, although only three complete, including the 2–1 away defeat against Liverpool in the semi-finals (2–2 aggregate win); he also featured one minute in the final.

In mid-August 2011, after Valera and Atlético amicably terminated the player's contract, which expired in June of the following year, he signed with fellow top-division side Getafe. He started at right-back during his first season, replacing longtime incumbent Miguel Torres, and scored his first goal on 26 November 2011 whilst handing Barcelona their first loss of the campaign through a 67th-minute header, for the game's only goal at the Coliseum Alfonso Pérez.

Again through a set piece and with his head, in the second fixture of 2012–13, Valera scored the equaliser to help Getafe to an eventual 2–1 home win over Real Madrid. On 3 June 2015, he left the club after his contract expired.

Valera was forced to retire aged 31 due to a hip injury.

== Honours ==
Atlético Madrid

- UEFA Europa League: 2009–10
- Copa del Rey runner-up: 2009–10

Spain U23

- Mediterranean Games: 2005
