= 2011–12 Real Zaragoza season =

Real Zaragoza
2011–12 season
- Manager: Javier Aguirre (until 30 December 2011); Manolo Jiménez (from 31 December 2011)
- Stadium: La Romareda
- La Liga: 16th
- Copa del Rey: Round of 32
- Top goalscorer: League: Hélder Postiga (9); All: Hélder Postiga (9)
- Biggest win: 2–0 v Real Sociedad (Home, 16 October 2011, La Liga); 2–0 v Espanyol (Away, 12 February 2012, La Liga); 2–0 v Athletic Bilbao (Home, 29 April 2012, La Liga); 2–0 v Getafe (Away, 13 May 2012, La Liga)
- Biggest defeat: 0–6 v Real Madrid (Home, 28 August 2011, La Liga)
Home colours	Away colours	Third colours

The 2011–12 season was Real Zaragoza's 77th season in history and the club's 3rd consecutive season in the La Liga, making it their 57th season in the top flight overall. In addition to the domestic league, Zaragoza participated in the Copa del Rey.

On 30 December 2011, the club dismissed manager Javier Aguirre after the club won only two of its opening 16 league matches and fell to the bottom of La Liga. The following day, Zaragoza appointed Manolo Jiménez as manager until the end of the season, replacing Aguirre after his dismissal.

== Squad ==
Squad at end of season

Note: Flags indicate national team as defined under FIFA eligibility rules; some limited exceptions apply. Players may hold more than one non-FIFA nationality.

No.	Pos.	Nation	Player
1	GK	ESP	Roberto
2	DF	ARG	Pablo Álvarez
3	DF	ESP	Javier Paredes
4	DF	ESP	David Mateos (on loan from Real Madrid)
5	DF	ITA	Maurizio Lanzaro
7	FW	ESP	Carlos Aranda
8	MF	ESP	Edu Oriol
9	FW	POR	Hélder Postiga
10	FW	ESP	Luis García
11	MF	ESP	Juan Carlos
14	DF	PAR	Paulo da Silva

No.	Pos.	Nation	Player
15	MF	CRO	Tomislav Dujmović (on loan from Dynamo Moscow)
16	MF	MEX	Pablo Barrera (on loan from West Ham United)
17	MF	ESP	Ángel Lafita
18	MF	POR	Rúben Micael (on loan from Atlético Madrid)
20	MF	ARG	Franco Zuculini (on loan from 1899 Hoffenheim)
21	DF	ESP	Abraham Minero
22	MF	HUN	Ádám Pintér
23	MF	ESP	Apoño
24	DF	SRB	Ivan Obradović
25	GK	ARG	Leo Franco
29	MF	ESP	Kevin Lacruz

== Transfers ==
Date	Name	Moving from	Moving to	Fee
27 May 2011	(Spain) Gabi	(Spain) Real Zaragoza	(Spain) Atlético Madrid	€3m
13 June 2011	(Spain) Edu Oriol	(Spain) FC Barcelona B	(Spain) Real Zaragoza	Free
13 June 2011	(Spain) Abraham Minero	(Spain) FC Barcelona B	(Spain) Real Zaragoza	Free
25 June 2011	(France) Florent Sinama Pongolle	(Spain) Real Zaragoza	(Portugal) Sporting CP	Loan return
1 July 2011	(Colombia) Marco Pérez	(Spain) Real Zaragoza	(Colombia) Boyacá Chicó	Loan return
1 July 2011	(Argentina) Nicolás Bertolo	(Spain) Real Zaragoza	(Italy) U.S. Palermo	Loan return
1 July 2011	(Brazil) Pablo Barros	(Brazil) Cruzeiro	(Spain) Real Zaragoza	Loan return
1 July 2011	(Spain) Raúl Goni	(Spain) Real Madrid Castilla	(Spain) Real Zaragoza	Loan return
1 July 2011	(Senegal) Guirane N'Daw	(Spain) Real Zaragoza	(France) AS Saint-Étienne	Loan return
1 July 2011	(Spain) Ander Herrera	(Spain) Real Zaragoza	(Spain) Athletic Bilbao	Loan return
1 July 2011	(Spain) David Mateos	(Spain) Real Madrid	(Spain) Real Zaragoza	Loan
7 July 2011	(Spain) Juan Carlos Pérez	(Portugal) S.C. Braga	(Spain) Real Zaragoza	Loan
26 July 2011	(Mexico) Efraín Juárez	(Scotland) Celtic F.C.	(Spain) Real Zaragoza	Loan
1 August 2011	(Spain) Roberto Jiménez	(Portugal) S.L. Benfica	(Spain) Real Zaragoza	€8.6m
9 August 2011	(Italy) Matteo Contini	(Spain) Real Zaragoza	(Italy) A.C. Siena	Loan
9 August 2011	(Spain) Raúl Goni	(Spain) Real Zaragoza	(Spain) FC Cartagena	Loan
12 August 2011	(Argentina) Franco Zuculini	(Germany) TSG 1899 Hoffenheim	(Spain) Real Zaragoza	Loan
15 August 2011	(Portugal) Fernando Meira	(Russia) FC Zenit Saint Petersburg	(Spain) Real Zaragoza	Free
19 August 2011	(Portugal) Rúben Micael	(Spain) Atlético Madrid	(Spain) Real Zaragoza	Loan
25 August 2011	(Mexico) Pablo Barrera	(England) West Ham United	(Spain) Real Zaragoza	Loan
31 August 2011	(Nigeria) Ikechukwu Uche	(Spain) Real Zaragoza	(Spain) Villarreal CF	€4m
31 August 2011	(Spain) Toni Doblas	(Spain) Real Zaragoza	(Spain) Xerez CD	Loan
31 August 2011	(Spain) Víctor Laguardia	(Spain) Real Zaragoza	(Spain) UD Las Palmas	Loan
31 August 2011	(Spain) Luis García	(Spain) RCD Espanyol	(Spain) Real Zaragoza	€1m
31 August 2011	(Portugal) Hélder Postiga	(Portugal) Sporting CP	(Spain) Real Zaragoza	€1m
27 September 2011	(Spain) Antonio Tomás	Free agent	(Spain) Real Zaragoza	Free
4 January 2012	(Argentina) Leonardo Ponzio	(Spain) Real Zaragoza	(Argentina) CA River Plate	Free
12 January 2012	(Croatia) Tomislav Dujmović	(Russia) FC Dynamo Moscow	(Spain) Real Zaragoza	Loan
12 January 2012	(Spain) Carlos Aranda	(Spain) Levante UD	(Spain) Real Zaragoza	Free
19 January 2012	(Spain) Apoño	(Spain) Málaga CF	(Spain) Real Zaragoza	Loan
31 January 2012	(Uruguay) Pablo Álvarez	(Italy) Calcio Catania	(Spain) Real Zaragoza	Loan

== Competitions ==
=== Overview ===
Competition	First match	Last match	Starting round	Final position	Record							
Competition	First match	Last match	Starting round	Final position	Pld	W	D	L	GF	GA	GD	Win %
La Liga	28 August 2011	13 May 2012	Matchday 1	16th	38	12	7	19	36	61	−25	31.58
Copa del Rey	13 December 2011	21 December 2011	Round of 32	Round of 32	2	0	1	1	1	3	−2	0.00
Total					40	12	8	20	37	64	−27	30.00

Source: Competitions

=== La Liga ===
==== League table ====
Pos	Team	Pld	W	D	L	GF	GA	GD	Pts	Qualification or relegation
14	Espanyol	38	12	10	16	46	56	−10	46	
15	Rayo Vallecano	38	13	4	21	53	73	−20	43 (Note: RVA 0–0 ZAR; ZAR 1–2 RVA)	
16	Zaragoza	38	12	7	19	36	61	−25	43	
17	Granada	38	12	6	20	35	56	−21	42	
18	Villarreal (R)	38	9	14	15	39	53	−14	41	Relegation to the Segunda División

Source: ESPN
Rules for classification: 1st points; 2nd head-to-head points; 3rd head-to-head goal difference; 4th head-to-head goals scored; 5th goal difference; 6th number of goals scored; 7th Fair-play points
(R) Relegated

==== Results summary ====
Overall								Home						Away					
Pld	W	D	L	GF	GA	GD	Pts	W	D	L	GF	GA	GD	W	D	L	GF	GA	GD
38	12	7	19	36	61	−25	43	8	4	7	19	24	−5	4	3	12	17	37	−20

Source: Soccerway

==== Results by round ====
Round	1	2	3	4	5	6	7	8	9	10	11	12	13	14	15	16	17	18	19	20	21	22	23	24	25	26	27	28	29	30	31	32	33	34	35	36	37	38
Ground	A	H	A	H	A	H	A	H	A	H	A	H	A	H	A	H	A	A	H	H	A	H	A	H	A	H	A	H	A	H	A	H	A	H	A	H	H	A
Result	D	L	D	W	L	D	D	W	L	L	L	D	L	L	L	L	L	L	D	W	L	L	W	L	L	W	L	D	W	W	W	L	L	W	L	W	W	W
Position	12	16	16	12	15	15	13	12	13	15	15	16	17	19	20	20	20	20	20	20	20	20	20	20	20	19	20	20	19	18	18	18	18	18	18	18	18	16
Points	1	1	2	5	5	6	7	10	10	10	10	11	11	11	11	11	11	11	12	15	15	15	18	18	18	21	21	22	25	28	31	31	31	34	34	37	40	43

Source: Worldfootball
A = Away; H = Home; W = Win; D = Draw; L = Loss

==== Matches ====
28 August 2011 2	Zaragoza	0–6	Real Madrid	Zaragoza
20:00 CEST (UTC+2)	Meira (yellow card) 20'; Minero (yellow card) 25'	Report	Ronaldo 23', 70', 86'; Marcelo 27'; Alonso 63'; Carvalho (yellow card) 68'; Kaká 81'	Stadium: La Romareda; Referee: C. Muniz

11 September 2011 3	Rayo Vallecano	0–0	Zaragoza	Madrid
18:00 CEST (UTC+2)	Botelho (yellow card) 34'; Casado (yellow card) 44'; Michu (yellow card) 65'; Delibašić (yellow card) 85'	Report	Juárez (yellow card) 18'; Mateos (yellow card) 54'; Postiga (yellow card) 58'; Da Silva (yellow card) 68'	Stadium: Campo de Vallecas; Referee: A. Alvarez

18 September 2011 4	Zaragoza	2–1	Espanyol	Zaragoza
16:00 CEST (UTC+2)	L. García 29', 89'; Postiga (yellow card) 41'; Mateos (yellow card) 83'	Report	Romaric (yellow card) 33'; Márquez (yellow card) 34'; Weiss (yellow card) 67'; López 71', (yellow card) 75' (yellow-red card) 86'; Moreno (yellow card) 84'	Stadium: La Romareda; Referee: J. L. Paradas Romero

22 September 2011 5	Real Betis	4–3	Zaragoza	Seville
22:00 CEST (UTC+2)	Santa Cruz 6', 49'; Sevilla 11' (pen.); Beñat 48' (pen.); Casto (red card) 70'	Report	Juárez 35'; Da Silva (yellow card) 47'; Juan Carlos 76', 78'; Zuculini (yellow card) 81'	Stadium: Benito Villamarín; Referee: A. Lahoz

25 September 2011 6	Zaragoza	0–0	Málaga	Zaragoza
22:00 CEST (UTC+2)	Meira (yellow card) 65'	Report	Sánchez (yellow card) 48'	Stadium: La Romareda; Referee: J. Estrada

1 October 2011 7	Villarreal	2–2	Zaragoza	Vila-real
18:00 CEST (UTC+2)	Rossi 41' (pen.); Pérez 84'	Report	Juárez (yellow card) 23'; Lanzaro (yellow card) 26' (yellow-red card) 80'; L. García 34'; Barrera 43'; Paredes (yellow card) 65'; Roberto (yellow card) 86'	Stadium: El Madrigal; Referee: C. Del Cerro

16 October 2011 8	Zaragoza	2–0	Real Sociedad	Zaragoza
16:00 CEST (UTC+2)	Postiga 11', 49'; L. García (yellow card) 16'; Ponzio (yellow card) 26'; Lafita (yellow card) 65'	Report	I. Martínez (yellow card) 23'; C. Martínez (yellow card) 57'; Aranburu (yellow card) 58'	Stadium: La Romareda; Referee: P. Perez

23 October 2011 9	Osasuna	3–0	Zaragoza	Pamplona
18:00 CEST (UTC+2)	R. García 18'; Nino 27'; Nekounam 30', (yellow card) 50'; Puñal (yellow card) 80'	Report	Meira (yellow card) 30'; Paredes (yellow card) 33'; Juárez (yellow card) 51'; Lafita (yellow card) 61'; Ponzio (yellow card) 63'; Lanzaro (yellow card) 84'	Stadium: El Sadar; Referee: J. Gonzalez

26 October 2011 10	Zaragoza	0–1	Valencia	Zaragoza
20:00 CEST (UTC+2)	Meira (yellow card) 20'; Mateos (yellow card) 48'; Paredes (yellow card) 61'	Report	Ruiz (yellow card) 31'; Feghouli (yellow card) 40'; Guaita (yellow card) 59'; Mathieu (yellow card) 79'; Alba 82'	Stadium: La Romareda; Referee: C. Velasco

30 October 2011 11	Atlético Madrid	3–1	Zaragoza	Madrid
20:00 CET (UTC+1)	Adrián 19', 75'; M. Suárez (yellow card) 23'; Domínguez 31'; Gabi (yellow card) 33'; Filipe Luís (yellow card) 89'	Report	Meira (yellow card) 44'; Ponzio (yellow card) 55'; Micael (yellow card) 58'; Postiga 79'	Stadium: Vicente Calderón; Referee: J. Estrada

6 November 2011 12	Zaragoza	2–2	Sporting Gijón	Zaragoza
16:00 CET (UTC+1)	Micael (yellow card) 27'; Botía 28' (o.g.); Juan Carlos (yellow card) 50'; Ponzio (yellow card) 69'; Paredes (yellow card) 75'; Postiga 90+2'	Report	Barral 31', 44'; D. Suárez (yellow card) 38'; Botía (yellow card) 85'	Stadium: La Romareda; Referee: M. Ayza

19 November 2011 13	Barcelona	4–0	Zaragoza	Barcelona
20:00 CET (UTC+1)	Piqué 18', (yellow card) 62'; Messi 43'; Puyol 54'; Villa 75'; Alves (yellow card) 88'	Report	Lanzaro (yellow card) 26'; Juárez (yellow card) 28'; Micael (yellow card) 63'	Stadium: Camp Nou; Referee: A. Undiano

27 November 2011 14	Zaragoza	0–1	Sevilla	Zaragoza
21:30 CET (UTC+1)	Mateos (yellow card) 22'; Paredes (yellow card) 28'; L. García (yellow card) 31'; Lanzaro (yellow card) 36'; Juárez (yellow card) 64'; Juan Carlos (red card) 90'	Report	Negredo 23' (pen.); Trochowski (yellow card) 63'; Armenteros (yellow card) 87'	Stadium: La Romareda; Referee: M. Perez

4 December 2011 15	Granada	1–0	Zaragoza	Granada
21:30 CET (UTC+1)	Jara (yellow card) 18'; Cortés (yellow card) 23'; Ighalo 45'	Report	Zuculini (yellow card) 7'; Minero (yellow card) 27'	Stadium: Nuevo Los Cármenes; Referee: C. Delgado

11 December 2011 16	Zaragoza	0–1	Mallorca	Zaragoza
18:00 CET (UTC+1)	Postiga (yellow card) 5'; Pintér (yellow card) 85'	Report	Cendrós (yellow card) 18'; Casadesús 39'	Stadium: La Romareda; Referee: F. Teixeira

17 December 2011 17	Athletic Bilbao	2–1	Zaragoza	Bilbao
20:00 CET (UTC+1)	Susaeta 7'; J. Martínez (red card) 21'; Herrera (yellow card) 78'; Toquero 86'	Report	Ponzio 22' (pen.), (yellow card) 30'; Lanzaro (yellow card) 23' (yellow-red card) 69'; Tomás (yellow card) 36'; Postiga (yellow card) 59'; Juárez (yellow card) 88'	Stadium: San Mamés; Referee: P. Perez

7 January 2012 18	Racing Santander	1–0	Zaragoza	Santander
18:00 CET (UTC+1)	Diop (yellow card) 25'; Arana (yellow card) 31'; Espinosa 44'	Report	Paredes (yellow card) 6'; Tomás (yellow card) 32'; Meira (yellow card) 83'	Stadium: El Sardinero; Referee: J. L. Paradas Romero

14 January 2012 19	Zaragoza	1–1	Getafe	Zaragoza
18:00 CET (UTC+1)	Paredes (yellow card) 34'; Lanzaro 39'; L. García (yellow card) 58'; Micael (yellow card) 76'	Report	Masilela (yellow card) 25'; Paredes 79' (o.g.); León (yellow card) 80'	Stadium: La Romareda; Referee: A. Lahoz

22 January 2012 1	Levante	0–0	Zaragoza	Valencia
19:45 CET (UTC+1)		Report		Stadium: Ciutat de València; Referee: D. Fernandez

28 January 2012 21	Real Madrid	3–1	Zaragoza	Madrid
20:00 CET (UTC+1)	Kaká 31'; Ronaldo 49', (yellow card) 63'; Özil 55'	Report	Aranda 10'; Paredes (yellow card) 25'; Apoño (yellow card) 44'	Stadium: Santiago Bernabéu; Referee: E. Iturralde

5 February 2012 22	Zaragoza	1–2	Rayo Vallecano	Zaragoza
19:45 CET (UTC+1)	Aranda (yellow card) 15'; Postiga 32'; L. García (yellow card) 35'; Lanzaro (yellow card) 55'; Paredes (yellow card) 56'	Report	Pulido (yellow card) 35'; Michu (yellow card) 40', (goal) 81'; Costa (yellow card) 56', (goal) 75'	Stadium: La Romareda; Referee: J. Fernandez

12 February 2012 23	Espanyol	0–2	Zaragoza	Barcelona
12:00 CET (UTC+1)	Vilà (yellow card) 42'; Coutinho (yellow card) 88'	Report	Lafita (yellow card) 43'; Da Silva 54'; Lanzaro (yellow card) 62'; Álvarez (yellow card) 68'; Zuculini (yellow card) 90+1'; Juan Carlos 90+1'; Roberto (yellow card) 90+2'	Stadium: Cornellà-El Prat; Referee: C. Muniz

20 February 2012 24	Zaragoza	0–2	Real Betis	Zaragoza
21:00 CET (UTC+1)	Oriol (yellow card) 36'; Apoño (yellow card) 45+2'; Da Silva (yellow card) 90+2'	Report	Castro 41', 68', (yellow card) 65'; Sevilla (yellow card) 45'; Cañas (yellow card) 66'; Beñat (yellow card) 85'	Stadium: La Romareda; Referee: C. Del Cerro

25 February 2012 25	Málaga	5–1	Zaragoza	Málaga
20:00 CET (UTC+1)	S. Fernández 45+1'; Toulalan (yellow card) 63'; Da Silva 67' (o.g.); Demichelis 77'; Isco 79'; Rondón 88'	Report	Lanzaro (yellow card) 7'; Pintér (yellow card) 15'; Aranda (yellow card) 23'; Álvarez (yellow card) 74'	Stadium: La Rosaleda; Referee: J. Alvarez

4 March 2012 26	Zaragoza	2–1	Villarreal	Zaragoza
12:00 CET (UTC+1)	L. García 85'; Paredes (yellow card) 89'; Apoño (yellow card) 90+3'; Minero 90+3'	Report	Martinuccio 16', (yellow card) 42'; Nilmar (yellow card) 29'; Marchena (yellow card) 90+2'	Stadium: La Romareda; Referee: J. Gonzalez

10 March 2012 27	Real Sociedad	3–0	Zaragoza	San Sebastián
18:00 CET (UTC+1)	Agirretxe 19', 40'; Vela 22'; M. González (yellow card) 24'; Estrada (yellow card) 62'	Report	Lanzaro (yellow card) 6' (yellow-red card) 84'; Álvarez (yellow card) 64'	Stadium: Anoeta; Referee: C. Velasco

17 March 2012 28	Zaragoza	1–1	Osasuna	Zaragoza
18:00 CET (UTC+1)	Pintér (yellow card) 33'; Paredes (yellow card) 38'; Lafita (yellow card) 61'; Micael (yellow card) 62'; Postiga 86', (yellow card) 86'	Report	R. García (yellow card) 36'; Nekounam (yellow card) 76'; Rovérsio 88'	Stadium: La Romareda; Referee: J. L. Paradas Romero

21 March 2012 29	Valencia	1–2	Zaragoza	Valencia
20:00 CET (UTC+1)	P. Hernández 5'; Dealbert (yellow card) 29'; Soldado (yellow card) 36'; Barragán (yellow card) 90+3'	Report	Álvarez (red card) 21'; Apoño 30' (pen.), 78'; Lanzaro (yellow card) 32'; Dujmović (yellow card) 43'; Roberto (yellow card) 58'; Zuculini (yellow card) 67' (yellow-red card) 89'	Stadium: Mestalla; Referee: C. Del Cerro

25 March 2012 30	Zaragoza	1–0	Atlético Madrid	Zaragoza
12:00 CEST (UTC+2)	Apoño 90+5' (pen.)	Report	Salvio (yellow card) 20'; Koke (yellow card) 61'; Diego (yellow card) 82'; M. Suárez (yellow card) 90'; Godín (yellow card) 90+4'	Stadium: La Romareda; Referee: A. Undiano

31 March 2012 31	Sporting Gijón	1–2	Zaragoza	Gijón
18:00 CEST (UTC+2)	Lora (yellow card) 33'; I. Hernández (yellow card) 41'; Eguren (yellow card) 49'; Rivera (yellow card) 89'	Report	Paredes (yellow card) 26'; Álvarez (yellow card) 34'; Postiga 37'; Pintér (yellow card) 54'; Apoño (yellow card) 62'; Lafita (yellow card) 63', (goal) 90+1'; Mateos (yellow card) 83'; L. García (yellow card) 89' (not on Pitch)	Stadium: El Molinón; Referee: J. Teixeira

7 April 2012 32	Zaragoza	1–4	Barcelona	Zaragoza
20:00 CEST (UTC+2)	Aranda (penalty missed) 24', 30'; Zuculini (yellow card) 28'; Minero (yellow card) 35' (yellow-red card) 45'; Micael (yellow card) 58'; Lanzaro (yellow card) 82'; Paredes (yellow card) 85'	Report	Valdés (yellow card) 23'; Puyol 36'; Messi 39', 86' (pen.); Keita (yellow card) 43'; Adriano (yellow card) 58'; Fàbregas (yellow card) 89'; Pedro 90+2'; Thiag (yellow card) 90+4'	Stadium: La Romareda; Referee: J. Alvare

12 April 2012 33	Sevilla	3–0	Zaragoza	Seville
22:00 CEST (UTC+2)	Fazio 11'; Navas (yellow card) 27'; Negredo 29', 43'; Luna (yellow card) 73'	Report	Pintér (yellow card) 21'; Paredes (yellow card) 45+3'; Mateos (yellow card) 74'	Stadium: Ramón Sánchez Pizjuán; Referee: F. Teixeira

15 April 2012 34	Zaragoza	1–0	Granada	Zaragoza
16:00 CEST (UTC+2)	Dujmović 6'; Álvarez (yellow card) 59'; Da Silva (yellow card) 80'; Paredes (yellow card) 82'; Micael (red card) 90+3'	Report	Geijo (yellow card) 30'; Nyom (yellow card) 63'; Jara (yellow card) 87'	Stadium: La Romareda; Referee: C. Del Cerro

21 April 2012 35	Mallorca	1–0	Zaragoza	Palma
18:00 CEST (UTC+2)	Casadesús 33'; Pina (yellow card) 48'; Cáceres (yellow card) 58'; Flores (yellow card) 85'	Report	Minero (yellow card) 14'; L. García (yellow card) 65'; Lanzaro (yellow card) 89'	Stadium: Iberostar Stadium; Referee: A. Alvarez

29 April 2012 36	Zaragoza	2–0	Athletic Bilbao	Zaragoza
16:00 CEST (UTC+2)	Oriol 28'; Apoño 51'; Micael (yellow card) 65'	Report	Herrera (yellow card) 64'; Iturraspe (yellow card) 84'	Stadium: La Romareda; Referee: I. Iglesias

2 May 2012 20	Zaragoza	1–0	Levante	Zaragoza
20:00 CEST (UTC+2)	Oriol 11'; Álvarez (yellow card) 27'; Lafita (yellow card) 61'; Postiga (yellow card) 78'; Roberto (yellow card) 86'; L. García (yellow card) 86'	Report	Iborra (yellow card) 55'; Cabral (yellow card) 73'; Botelho (yellow card) 78'; Valdo (yellow card) 88'; X. Torres (yellow card) 90+3'	Stadium: La Romareda; Referee: J. Estrada

5 May 2012 37	Zaragoza	2–1	Racing Santander	Zaragoza
21:00 CEST (UTC+2)	Lanzaro (yellow card) 13' (not on Pitch); Postiga 13'; Pintér (yellow card) 45'; Lafita 78', (yellow card) 79'	Report	C. Fernández 11', (yellow card) 54'; M. Fernández (yellow card) 44'; Á. González (yellow card) 45'; Rivero (yellow card) 45+1'; Gullón (yellow card) 56'; Luque (yellow card) 85'; Diop (yellow card) 90'	Stadium: La Romareda; Referee: J. L. Paradas Romero

13 May 2012 38	Getafe	0–2	Zaragoza	Getafe
20:00 CEST (UTC+2)	M. Torres (yellow card) 14' (yellow-red card) 57'; Sarabia (yellow card) 25' (yellow-red card) 25'; Valera (yellow card) 36'; Lacen (yellow card) 79'; Miku (red card) 87'	Report	Paredes (yellow card) 6'; Apoño 58' (pen.); Micael (yellow card) 81'; Dujmović (red card) 83'; L. García (yellow card) 87'; Postiga 90+1', (yellow card) 90+2'	Stadium: Coliseum Alfonso Pérez; Referee: J. Teixeira

=== Copa del Rey ===
13 December 2011 Round of 32 First leg	Alcorcón	1–1	Zaragoza	Alcorcón
21:00 CET (UTC+1)	Riera 21', (yellow card) 66'; García (yellow card) 45'	Report	Ortí 6'; Minero (yellow card) 45'; Juárez (yellow card) 62'; Oriol (yellow card) 86'	Stadium: Estadio Municipal de Santo Domingo

21 December 2011 Round of 32 Second leg	Zaragoza	0–2 (1–3 agg.)	Alcorcón	Zaragoza
21:00 CET (UTC+1)	Ponzio (yellow card) 53'; Paredes (yellow card) 72'; Lacruz (yellow card) 82'; Minero (yellow card) 83'	Report	Sanz (yellow card) 37'; Agus (yellow card) 75'; Miguélez (yellow card) 78'; Riera 86'; Quini 89'	Stadium: La Romareda
Note: Alcorcón won 3–1 on aggregate.
