= 2014–15 SD Eibar season =

SD Eibar
2014–15 season
- President: Alex Aranzábal
- Head coach: Gaizka Garitano
- Stadium: Ipurua
- La Liga: 18th
- Copa del Rey: Round of 32
- Top goalscorer: League: Mikel Arruabarrena (9); All: Mikel Arruabarrena (9)
Home colours	Away colours

The 2014–15 SD Eibar season is the club's 74th overall season and its first in La Liga, the top division of the Spanish football league system.

== Squad ==
=== First Team Squad ===
Updated on 25 January 2015.

Squad No.	Name	Nationality	Position(s)	Date of Birth (Age)	Signed from	contract to
Goalkeepers
1	Xabi Irureta	(Spain)	GK	21 March 1986 (age 40)	Eibar Academy	2015
13	Txusta	(Spain)	GK	30 April 1986 (age 40)	(Spain) Beasain	2015
25	Jaime	(Spain)	GK	10 December 1980 (age 45)	(Spain) Valladolid	2015
Defenders
2	Eneko Bóveda	(Spain)	RB	14 December 1988 (age 37)	(Spain) Athletic Bilbao B	2015
4	Txema Añibarro (C)	(Spain)	CB / CM	26 July 1979 (age 47)	(Spain) Sestao	2015
5	Borja Ekiza	(Spain)	CB / CM	6 April 1988 (age 38)	(Spain) Athletic Bilbao	2016
16	Lillo	(Spain)	RB	27 March 1989 (age 37)	(Spain) Alcoyano	2015
17	Dídac Vilà	(Spain)	CB	9 June 1989 (age 37)	(Italy) Milan	2015
22	Raúl Navas	(Spain)	CB	11 May 1988 (age 38)	(Spain) Real Sociedad (loan)	2015
24	Abraham	(Spain)	LB	22 February 1986 (age 40)	(Spain) Zaragoza (loan)	2015
Midfielders
7	Ander Capa	(Spain)	RW / LW	8 February 1992 (age 34)	Eibar Academy	2015
8	Jon Errasti	(Spain)	CM	6 June 1988 (age 38)	(Spain) Real Sociedad B	2015
12	Borja	(Spain)	DM	14 January 1981 (age 45)	(India) Atlético de Kolkata	2015
14	Dani García	(Spain)	CM	24 May 1990 (age 36)	(Spain) Real Sociedad	2016
18	Derek Boateng	(Ghana)	DM	1 May 1983 (age 43)	(Spain) Rayo Vallecano	2015
23	Javi Lara	(Spain)	CM	27 April 1980 (age 46)	(Spain) Ponferradina	2015
Strikers
9	Ángel	(Spain)	ST	26 April 1987 (age 39)	(Spain) Levante	2015
10	Mikel Arruabarrena	(Spain)	ST / CF	9 February 1983 (age 43)	(Poland) Legia Warsaw	2016
11	Dani Nieto	(Spain)	RW / LW	4 May 1991 (age 35)	(Spain) Barcelona B	2016
15	Dejan Lekić	(Serbia)	ST / CF	7 July 1985 (age 41)	(Spain) Sporting de Gijón	2015
19	Federico Piovaccari	(Italy)	ST / CF	1 September 1984 (age 42)	(Italy) Sampdoria (loan)	2015
20	Manu	(Spain)	ST / CF	25 February 1984 (age 42)	(Spain) Sevilla (loan)	2015
21	Saúl	(Spain)	ST / CF	24 May 1986 (age 40)	(Spain) Murcia	2016

== Transfers ==
=== In ===
Date	Pos.	Name	From	Fee
9 July 2014.	FW	(Spain) Ángel	(Spain) Levante	Free
9 July 2014	GK	(Spain) Jaime	(Spain) Valladolid	Free
24 July 2014	MF	(Spain) Javi Lara	(Spain) Ponferradina	€12,000
31 July 2014	FW	(Spain) Dani Nieto	(Spain) Barcelona B	€75,000
31 July 2014	DF	(Spain) Borja Ekiza	(Spain) Athletic Bilbao	Free
5 August 2014	DF	(Spain) Abraham	(Spain) Zaragoza	Loan
8 August 2014	FW	(Spain) Manu	(Spain) Sevilla	Loan
18 August 2014	MF	(Ghana) Derek Boateng	(Spain) Rayo Vallecano	Free
19 August 2014	FW	(Italy) Federico Piovaccari	(Italy) Sampdoria	Loan
26 August 2014	FW	(Spain) Saúl	(Spain) Murcia	Free
31 August 2014	FW	(Serbia) Dejan Lekić	(Spain) Sporting de Gijón	Free
31 December 2014	MF	(Spain) Borja	(India) Atlético de Kolkata	Free

=== Out ===
Date	Pos.	Name	From	Transfer Type	Fee
9 July 2014	DF	(Spain) Yuri Berchiche	(Spain) Real Sociedad	Loan return	None
9 July 2014	MF	(Spain) Jota	(Spain) Celta de Vigo	Loan Return	None
9 July 2014	MF	(Brazil) Gilvan	(Spain) Hércules	Loan return	None
9 July 2014	GK	(Argentina) Matías Ibáñez	(Argentina) Lanús	Transfer	Free
9 July 2014	FW	(Spain) José Luis Morales	(Spain) Levante	Loan return	None
9 July 2014	MF	(Spain) Alain Eizmendi	(Spain) Real Sociedad	Loan return	None
9 July 2014	MF	(Spain) Diego Jiménez	(Spain) Olímpic de Xàtiva	Transfer	Free
9 July 2014	FW	(Spain) Urko Vera	(Spain) Mirandés	Transfer	Free
2 August 2014	DF	(Spain) Aitor Arregi	(Spain) Cádiz	Loan	None
25 August 2014	MF	(Spain) Diego Rivas	(Spain) Llagostera	Transfer	Free
28 August 2014	DF	(Spain) Gorka Kijera	(Spain) Mirandés	Transfer	Free
16 January 2015	DF	(Spain) Raúl Albentosa	(England) Derby County	Transfer	€600,000

== Competitions ==
=== Overall ===
Competition	Started round	Final position / round	First match	Last match
La Liga	—		August 2014	May 2015
Copa del Rey	Round of 32		December 2014	

Updated to match played June 2014
Source: Competitions

=== La Liga ===
==== League table ====
Pos	Team	Pld	W	D	L	GF	GA	GD	Pts	Qualification or relegation
16	Deportivo La Coruña	38	7	14	17	35	60	−25	35 (Note: Head-to-head record: Deportivo 7 pts, Granada 6 pts, Eibar 2 pts)	
17	Granada	38	7	14	17	29	64	−35	35	
18	Eibar	38	9	8	21	34	55	−21	35	
19	Almería (Note: Almería was docked 3 points due to an unpayment of a transfer.) (R)	38	8	8	22	35	64	−29	29	Relegation to Segunda División
20	Córdoba (R)	38	3	11	24	22	68	−46	20	Relegation to Segunda División

Source: La Liga
Rules for classification: 1) points; 2) head-to-head points; 3) head-to-head goal difference; 4) goal difference; 5) number of goals scored; 6) fair-play points; 7) playoff match
(R) Relegated

==== Results by round ====
Round	1	2	3	4	5	6	7	8	9	10	11	12	13	14	15	16	17	18	19	20	21	22	23	24	25	26	27	28	29	30	31	32	33	34	35	36	37	38
Ground	H	A	H	A	H	A	H	A	H	A	A	H	A	H	A	H	A	H	A	A	H	A	H	A	H	A	H	A	H	H	A	H	A	H	A	H	A	H
Result	W	L	L	W	D	D	D	L	D	W	L	L	W	W	D	L	W	W	D	L	L	L	L	L	L	L	L	D	L	W	L	L	L	L	L	L	D	W
Position	7	11	14	9	9	8	9	12	11	9	10	12	11	9	9	9	8	8	8	8	8	8	10	11	13	14	14	14	14	14	14	15	16	16	17	19	19	18

Updated to match(es) played on 1 March 2015. Source: Competitive matches
A = Away; H = Home; W = Win; D = Draw; L = Loss

==== Matches ====
Kickoff times are in CET. Win Draw Loss

24 August 2014 1	Eibar	1–0	Real Sociedad	Eibar
19:00 CEST	Lara 45'; Arruabarrena (yellow card) 52'; Errasti (yellow card) 60'; Navas (yellow card) 89'; García (yellow card) 90+1'	Report	Berchiche (yellow card) 68'	Stadium: Ipurua; Attendance: 5,173

31 August 2014 2	Atlético Madrid	2–1	Eibar	Madrid
21:00 CEST	Miranda 11'; Mandžukić 25'; Suárez (yellow card) 54'; Koke (yellow card) 64'; Gabi (yellow card) 74'	Report	Abraham 33'	Stadium: Vicente Calderón; Attendance: 48,000

15 September 2014 3	Eibar	0–1	Deportivo	Eibar
20:45		Report	J. Domínguez 12'; Cavaleiro (yellow card) 15'; Medunjanin (yellow card) 31'; Postiga (yellow card) 53'; Lopo (yellow card) 78'; Fabricio (yellow card) 83'; Sidnei (yellow card) 87'	Stadium: Ipurua; Referee: Mario Melero López

19 September 2014 4	Elche	0–2	Eibar	Elche
21:00 CEST	Lombán (yellow card) 71'		García 3'; Irureta (yellow card) 31'; Albentosa 42'	Stadium: Martínez Valero; Attendance: 22,474

24 September 2014 5	Eibar	1–1	Villarreal	Eibar
20:00	Arruabarrena 8'; Nieto (yellow card) 28'; Abraham (yellow card) 34'; Lillo (yellow card) 70'; Albentosa (yellow card) 90+1'	Summary	Pina (yellow card) 8'; Gabriel (yellow card) 28'; Cheryshev (yellow card) 50'; Gerard 71'; Moi (yellow card) 83'	Stadium: Ipurua Municipal Stadium; Attendance: 4,231; Referee: Fernando Teixeira Vitienes

27 September 2014 6	Athletic Bilbao	0–0	Eibar	Bilbao
21:00 CEST (UTC+02:00)	Aduriz (yellow card) 4'; Iraola (yellow card) 41'; Balenziaga (yellow card) 56'; Rico (yellow card) 79'; Muniain (yellow card) 90+2'	Report	Bóveda (yellow card) 21'; Errasti (yellow card) 25'; Arruabarrena (yellow card) 38'; Capa (yellow card) 53'; Navas (yellow card) 53'; Ángel (yellow card) 90+2'	Stadium: San Mamés; Attendance: 45,000; Referee: Carlos Velasco Carballo (Madrid)

4 October 2014 7	Eibar	3–3	Levante	Eibar
20:00	López 46' (o.g.); Bóveda (yellow card) 52'; Castellano (yellow card) 63'; Saúl 70'; Arruabarrena (yellow card) 79'; Piovaccari 90'		Morales 2'; Camarasa 43'; Víctor (yellow card) 47', (goal) 79'	Stadium: Ipurua; Attendance: 4,265

18 October 2014 8	Barcelona	3–0	Eibar	Barcelona
20:00 CEST (UTC+02:00)	Xavi 60'; Neymar (yellow card) 40', (goal) 72'; Messi 74'; Iniesta (yellow card) 82'	Report	Lillo (yellow card) 45'; Lara (yellow card) 53'	Stadium: Camp Nou; Attendance: 75,546; Referee: Teixeira Vitienes

25 October 2014 9	Eibar	1–1	Granada	Eibar
22:00	Navas (yellow card) 14'; Bóveda (yellow card) 19', (goal) 37'; Abraham (yellow card) 57'	Report	8' Nyom; (yellow card) 23' Foulquier; (yellow card) 25' Córdoba; (yellow card) 49' Murillo; (yellow card) 79' Rico	Stadium: Ipurua; Attendance: 4,838; Referee: Antonio Mateu Lahoz

3 November 2014 10	Rayo Vallecano	2–3	Eibar	Madrid
20:45	Martínez (yellow card) 36'; Baptistão 67', 68'		Arruabarrena 37' (pen.), 86'; Piovaccari 49'; Castellano (yellow card) 54'; García (yellow card) 61'	Stadium: Vallecas; Attendance: 10,625

8 November 2014 11	Málaga	2–1	Eibar	Málaga
22:00	Boka (yellow card) 37'; Juanmi 53'; Horta (yellow card) 72'; Camacho (yellow card) 89'; Amrabat 89' (pen.)		Castellano (yellow card) 26'; Arruabarrena 42'; Navas (yellow card) 67' (yellow-red card) 88'; Albentosa (yellow card) 89'	Stadium: La Rosaleda; Attendance: 22,600

22 November 2014 12	Eibar	0–4	Real Madrid	Eibar
18:00	Irureta (yellow card) 32'; Arruabarrena (yellow card) 72'; Errasti (yellow card) 82'; Albentosa (yellow card) 83'	Report	Ramos (yellow card) 21'; Rodríguez 23', (yellow card) 42'; Ronaldo 43', 83'; Benzema 70'	Stadium: Ipurua; Attendance: 5,859; Referee: David Fernández Borbalán

29 November 2014 13	Celta de Vigo	0–1	Eibar	Vigo
22:00	Larrivey (yellow card) 32'; López (yellow card) 60'; Fontàs (yellow card) 80'; Fernández (yellow card) 82'	Report	Saúl (yellow card) 10'; Manu 31', (yellow card) 80'; Capa (yellow card) 59'; Lillo (yellow card) 70'; Abraham (yellow card) 71'	Stadium: Balaídos; Attendance: 16,843; Referee: Pedro Pérez Montero

8 December 2014 14	Eibar	5–2	Almería	Eibar
17:00	Piovaccari 3', (yellow card) 28'; Saúl 21'; Albentosa 31'; García (yellow card) 35'; Navas 57'; Boateng (yellow card) 70'; Capa 74', (yellow card) 85'	Summary	Soriano 43'; Corona (yellow card) 47'; Thomas (yellow card) 53'; Édgar 77'; Silva (yellow card) 86'	Stadium: Ipurua; Attendance: 4,200; Referee: (Spain) José González González

14 December 2014 15	Sevilla	0–0	Eibar	Seville
17:00	Arribas (yellow card) 52'; Krychowiak (yellow card) 85'; Suárez (yellow card) 88'	Report	Lillo (yellow card) 17'; Abraham (yellow card) 22'; Albentosa (yellow card) 52'; García (yellow card) 80'; Lara (yellow card) 88'; Piovaccari (yellow card) 90+3'	Stadium: Ramón Sánchez Pizjuán; Attendance: 20,000; Referee: Xavier Estrada Fernández

20 December 2014 16	Eibar	0–1	Valencia	Eibar
20:00	Saúl (yellow card) 32'; Arruabarrena (yellow card) 36'; Capa (yellow card) 44'; Navas (yellow card) 60'; Albentosa (yellow card) 62'; Lillo (yellow card) 84'; Piovaccari (yellow card) 90'	Report	Fuego (yellow card) 30'; Alcácer 31'; Barragán (yellow card) 86'; Alves (yellow card) 90'	Stadium: Ipurua; Attendance: 4,700; Referee: (Spain) Carlos Velasco Carballo

4 January 2015 17	Espanyol	1–2	Eibar	Cornellà de Llobregat
19:00	Caicedo 80'; Arbilla (yellow card) 83'	Report	Manu 34'; Piovaccari 38'; Ekiza (yellow card) 50'	Stadium: Cornellà-El Prat; Attendance: 19,136; Referee: Antonio Mateu Lahoz

== Squad statistics ==
=== Appearances and goals ===
Updated as of 30 May 2015.

No.	Pos	Nat	Player	Total		La Liga		Copa del Rey	
No.	Pos	Nat	Player	Apps	Goals	Apps	Goals	Apps	Goals
1	GK	(Spain) ESP	Xabi Irureta	33	0	33	0	0	0
2	DF	(Spain) ESP	Eneko Bóveda	37	2	35	2	1+1	0
4	MF	(Spain) ESP	Txema Añibarro	16	0	12+3	0	1	0
5	DF	(Spain) ESP	Borja Ekiza	13	0	11	0	2	0
7	MF	(Spain) ESP	Ander Capa	36	3	27+7	3	1+1	0
8	MF	(Spain) ESP	Jon Errasti	27	0	19+6	0	2	0
9	FW	(Spain) ESP	Ángel	17	0	6+9	0	1+1	0
10	FW	(Spain) ESP	Mikel Arruabarrena	34	9	29+5	9	0	0
11	FW	(Spain) ESP	Dani Nieto	11	0	1+8	0	2	0
12	MF	(Spain) ESP	Borja Fernández	16	1	14+2	1	0	0
13	GK	(Spain) ESP	Txusta	2	0	0	0	2	0
14	MF	(Spain) ESP	Dani García	36	1	34	1	1+1	0
15	FW	(Serbia) SRB	Dejan Lekić	20	0	1+17	0	2	0
16	DF	(Spain) ESP	Lillo	33	0	28+3	0	1+1	0
17	DF	(Spain) ESP	Dídac Vilà	16	0	12+3	0	1	0
18	MF	(Ghana) GHA	Derek Boateng	14	0	8+5	0	1	0
19	FW	(Italy) ITA	Federico Piovaccari	30	7	17+11	6	1+1	1
20	FW	(Spain) ESP	Manu del Moral	28	3	21+7	3	0	0
21	FW	(Spain) ESP	Saúl Berjón	34	3	30+4	3	0	0
22	DF	(Spain) ESP	Raúl Navas	29	2	28+1	2	0	0
23	MF	(Spain) ESP	Javi Lara	33	1	16+15	1	2	0
24	DF	(Spain) ESP	Abraham Minero	23	1	14+8	1	1	0
25	GK	(Spain) ESP	Jaime Jiménez	5	0	5	0	0	0
Players who have made an appearance or had a squad number this season but have been loaned out or transferred
6	DF	(Spain) ESP	Raúl Albentosa	17	2	17	2	0	0
