= 2012–13 Real Zaragoza season =

Real Zaragoza
2012–13 season
- La Liga: 20th (relegated)
- Copa del Rey: Quarter-finals
| Home colours | Away colours | Third colours |

The 2012–13 Real Zaragoza season was the 78th season in club history.

== Competitions ==
=== La Liga ===
==== League table ====
| Pos | Team | Pld | W | D | L | GF | GA | GD | Pts | Qualification or relegation |
|---|---|---|---|---|---|---|---|---|---|---|
| 16 | Osasuna | 38 | 10 | 9 | 19 | 33 | 50 | −17 | 39 | |
| 17 | Celta Vigo | 38 | 10 | 7 | 21 | 37 | 52 | −15 | 37 | |
| 18 | Mallorca (R) | 38 | 9 | 9 | 20 | 43 | 72 | −29 | 36 | Relegation to Segunda División |
| 19 | Deportivo La Coruña (R) | 38 | 8 | 11 | 19 | 47 | 70 | −23 | 35 | Relegation to Segunda División |
| 20 | Zaragoza (R) | 38 | 9 | 7 | 22 | 37 | 62 | −25 | 34 | Relegation to Segunda División |

Source: La Liga
Rules for classification: 1st points; 2nd head-to-head points; 3rd head-to-head goal difference; 4th goal difference; 5th number of goals scored; 7th Fair-play points
(R) Relegated

=== Legend ===
Win Draw Loss Postponed

==== Matches ====
| 20 August 2012 1 | Real Zaragoza | 0 – 1 | Real Valladolid | Zaragoza |
| 23:00 | Apoño (yellow card) 68'; José Mari (yellow card) 82' | Report | Jaime (yellow card) 11'; González 45', (yellow card) 74'; Rubio (yellow card) 63'; Sastre (yellow card) 85' | Stadium: La Romareda; Attendance: 24,000; Referee: Alejandro José Hernández Hernández; Assistant referees: Manuel Aboy Rivas; Miguel Martínez Munuera; Fourth official: Alexandre Alemán |

| 25 August 2012 2 | Espanyol | 1 – 2 | Real Zaragoza | Barcelona |
| 21:00 | Albín (yellow card) 24' (yellow-red card) 50'; Mubarak (yellow card) 39'; Álvaro 43'; Sánchez (yellow card) 79'; Rodríguez (yellow card) 85'; Gómez (yellow card) 90+3' | Report | Apoño 51' (pen.); Goni (yellow card) 59'; Pintér (yellow card) 66'; Rodríguez (yellow card) 82'; Montañés (yellow card) 85'; Postiga 89' | Stadium: Cornellà-El Prat; Attendance: 16,923; Referee: José Luis Paradas Romero; Assistant referees: Jesús Zancada Lobato; Jorge Canelo Prieto; Fourth official: Abraham Domínguez |

| 1 September 2012 3 | Real Zaragoza | 0 – 1 | Málaga | Zaragoza |
| 18:00 | José Mari (yellow card) 58' | Summary | Weligton (yellow card) 30'; Camacho 56', (yellow card) 74'; Duda (yellow card) 84'; Saviola (yellow card) 90' | Stadium: La Romareda; Attendance: 20,000; Referee: Alberto Undiano; Assistant referees: Roberto Díaz; Juan Yuste; Fourth official: Iosu Galech |

| 16 September 2012 4 | Real Sociedad | 2 – 0 | Real Zaragoza | San Sebastián |
| 19:50 | De la Bella (yellow card) 38'; I. Martínez 55'; Bergara (yellow card) 57'; Vela 61' (pen.), (yellow card) 68'; Griezmann (yellow card) 90+3' | Summary | Paredes (yellow card) 37'; Abraham (yellow card) 90+1' | Stadium: Anoeta; Attendance: 20,000; Referee: Ignacio Iglesias; Assistant referees: Alfonso Costoya; Víctor Fernández; Fourth official: José Corral |

| 22 September 2012 5 | Real Zaragoza | 3 – 1 | Osasuna | Zaragoza |
| 16:00 | Postiga 4'; Timor 45' (o.g.); Abraham (yellow card) 67'; Apoño 71' (pen.); Paredes (yellow card) 84' | Summary | Armenteros 29', (yellow card) 77'; Loé (yellow card) 70' | Stadium: La Romareda; Attendance: 22,000; Referee: Miguel Pérez Lasa; Assistant referees: Teodoro Sobrino Magán; Jacobo Martínez Segovia; Fourth official: Carlos Moreno |

| 29 September 2012 6 | Valencia | 2 – 0 | Real Zaragoza | Valencia |
| 16:00 | Feghouli 12', (yellow card) 45+1' (yellow-red card) 62'; T. Costa (yellow card) 48'; Viera 59'; Soldado (yellow card) 82' | Summary | José Mari (yellow card) 24'; Săpunaru (yellow card) 74' | Stadium: Mestalla; Attendance: 27,000; Referee: Pedro Pérez; Assistant referees: José Matías; Alfonso Hernández; Fourth official: Juan Vico |

| 6 October 2012 7 | Real Zaragoza | 0 – 1 | Getafe | Zaragoza |
| 18:00 | Romaric (red card) 9'; Săpunaru (yellow card) 21'; José Mari (yellow card) 48'; Postiga (yellow card) 50'; Roberto (yellow card) 63'; Álvaro (red card) 63' | Summary | Abraham (yellow card) 22'; Torres (yellow card) 32'; Castro 64' (pen.); Barrada (red card) 84' | Stadium: La Romareda; Attendance: 18,000; Referee: César Muñiz; Assistant referees: José Fernández; Francisco Martín; Fourth official: Óscar Marín |

| 21 October 2012 8 | Granada | 1 – 2 | Real Zaragoza | Granada |
| 17:00 | Iriney (yellow card) 31', (red card) 72'; Nyom (yellow card) 40'; López (yellow card) 63'; El-Arabi 77'; Ortiz (yellow card) 83'; Orellana (yellow card) 86' | Summary | Movilla (yellow card) 1'; Postiga 3', (yellow card) 21'; Rodríguez 27'; Paredes (yellow card) 59'; Apoño (yellow card) 73' | Stadium: Los Cármenes; Attendance: 21,000; Referee: José Teixeira; Assistant referees: Francisco Lamsfús; César García; Fourth official: Raúl Nicolás |

| 28 October 2012 9 | Real Zaragoza | 2 – 1 | Sevilla | Zaragoza |
| 12:00 | Postiga 36'; Săpunaru 45', (yellow card) 61'; Rodríguez (yellow card) 79'; Movilla (yellow card) 82' | Summary | Botía (yellow card) 12'; Spahić (yellow card) 63'; Medel 70', (yellow card) 90+5'; Fazio (yellow card) 90'; Navas (yellow card) 90+4' | Stadium: La Romareda; Attendance: 23,000; Referee: Carlos Del Cerro; Assistant referees: Marcos Álvarez; Abraham Álvarez; Fourth official: Valentín Pizarro |

| 3 November 2012 10 | Real Madrid | 4 – 0 | Real Zaragoza | Madrid |
| 20:00 | Higuaín 23'; Di María 25'; Modrić (yellow card) 37', (goal) 90+2'; Ramos (yellow card) 65'; Essien 89' | Summary | Abraham (yellow card) 70'; Săpunaru (yellow card) 75' | Stadium: Santiago Bernabéu; Attendance: 67,227; Referee: Javier Estrada; Assistant referees: Jordi Esquerdo; Francisco Martín; Fourth official: Juan Perdigones |

| 10 November 2012 11 | Real Zaragoza | 5 – 3 | Deportivo La Coruña | Zaragoza |
| 20:00 | Loovens (yellow card) 17'; Apoño 28' (pen.); Abraham (yellow card) 50'; Álvaro (yellow card) 59', (goal) 66'; Montañés 61'; Postiga 77', 82'; Săpunaru (yellow card) 90' | Summary | Gama 13'; Riki 21'; Pinto (yellow card) 26'; Pizzi (yellow card) 27' (yellow-red card) 49'; Camuñas (yellow card) 65'; Laure (yellow card) 85'; Bodipo 90+2' | Stadium: La Romareda; Attendance: 16,000; Referee: Fernando Teixeira; Assistant referees: Raúl Cabañero; Marcos Álvarez; Fourth official: Ángel Hernández |

| 17 November 2012 12 | Barcelona | 3 – 1 | Real Zaragoza | Barcelona |
| 20:00 | Messi 16', 60'; Song 28' | Summary | Montañés 24'; Zuculini (yellow card) 48' | Stadium: Camp Nou; Attendance: 73,428; Referee: Miguel Ayza; Assistant referees: Miguel Martínez; Jorge Paredes; Fourth official: Alonso Vizuete |

| 26 November 2012 13 | Real Zaragoza | 0 – 1 | Celta Vigo | Zaragoza |
| 21:00 | Săpunaru (yellow card) 32'; Álvaro (yellow card) 87'; Apoño (yellow card) 88' | Summary | Cabral (yellow card) 35'; Aspas 83' | Stadium: La Romareda; Attendance: 31,000; Referee: Carlos Delgado; Assistant referees: Aitor Ríos; Andoni Huerga; Fourth official: Juan López |

| 2 December 2012 14 | Mallorca | 1 – 1 | Real Zaragoza | Palma |
| 21:00 | Pereira (yellow card) 42'; Bigas (yellow card) 45+3'; Víctor (yellow card) 47', (goal) 85' | Summary | Loovens (yellow card) 2' (yellow-red card) 13'; Postiga 16'; Săpunaru (yellow card) 28'; Movilla (yellow card) 89'; Roberto (yellow card) 90+4' | Stadium: Iberostar; Attendance: 7,735; Referee: Miguel Pérez; Assistant referees: Teodoro Sobrino; Jacobo Martínez; Fourth official: Ander Zarrabeitia |

| 8 December 2012 15 | Rayo Vallecano | 0 – 2 | Real Zaragoza | Madrid |
| 21:00 | Bangoura (yellow card) 63'; Fuego (yellow card) 80' | Summary | Zuculini 21', (yellow card) 59'; Abraham (yellow card) 27'; Álvaro (yellow card) 53'; Apoño 60' | Stadium: Vallecas; Attendance: 7,834; Referee: Alberto Undiano; Assistant referees: Roberto Díaz; Jesús Calvo; Fourth official: Pablo Fernández |

| 16 December 2012 16 | Real Zaragoza | 0 – 1 | Levante | Zaragoza |
| 12:00 | Săpunaru (yellow card) 26'; Postiga (yellow card) 53'; Movilla (yellow card) 63'; Apoño (yellow card) 70' | Summary | García 19'; Iborra (yellow card) 44'; Martins (yellow card) 50'; Lell (yellow card) 68' (yellow-red card) 90+3'; Diop (yellow card) 72'; Juanlu (yellow card) 89' | Stadium: La Romareda; Attendance: 17,000; Referee: Ignacio Iglesias; Assistant referees: Alfonso Costoya; Víctor Fernández; Fourth official: Jon González |

| 22 December 2012 17 | Athletic Bilbao | 0 – 2 | Real Zaragoza | Bilbao |
| 22:00 | Herrera (yellow card) 52' | Summary | Apoño 31' (pen.); Săpunaru (yellow card) 34'; Postiga 42'; Montañés (yellow card) 60'; Babović (yellow card) 77' | Stadium: San Mamés; Attendance: 15,651; Referee: Antonio Mateu; Assistant referees: Pau Cebrián; Jorge Canelo; Fourth official: César Soto |

| 4 January 2013 18 | Real Zaragoza | 1 – 2 | Real Betis | Zaragoza |
| 21:30 | Movilla (yellow card) 26'; Paredes (yellow card) 45'; Postiga (yellow card) 52'; Montañés 77'; Álvaro (yellow card) 81', (red card) 90+4'; Abraham (yellow card) 90+1' | Summary | Cañas (yellow card) 19'; Amaya (yellow card) 41'; Castro 44'; Nosa (yellow card) 50'; Molina 58'; Beñat (yellow card) 71'; Nacho (yellow card) 89' | Stadium: La Romareda; Attendance: 17,000; Referee: José Teixeira |

| 13 January 2013 19 | Atlético Madrid | 2 – 0 | Real Zaragoza | Madrid |
| 19:00 | Tiago 31'; Falcao 38' (pen.); Miranda (yellow card) 90+3' | Summary | Paredes (yellow card) 26'; Săpunaru (yellow card) 37'; José Mari (yellow card) 75' | Stadium: Vicente Calderón; Attendance: 45,000; Referee: José González |

| 20 January 2013 20 | Real Valladolid | 2 – 0 | Real Zaragoza | Valladolid |
| 17:00 | Guerra 12'; Ramos (yellow card) 63'; Óscar 74' | Summary | Apoño (yellow card) 45'; Lanzaro (yellow card) 45+1'; Abraham (yellow card) 60' | Stadium: Nuevo José Zorrilla; Attendance: 13,058; Referee: Carlos Del Cerro |

| 26 January 2013 21 | Real Zaragoza | 0 – 0 | Espanyol | Zaragoza |
| 20:00 | Abraham (yellow card) 20'; Săpunaru (yellow card) 51' (yellow-red card) 82' | Summary | López (yellow card) 23' (yellow-red card) 79'; Sánchez (yellow card) 33'; Stuani (yellow card) 59'; Gómez (yellow card) 74' | Stadium: La Romareda; Attendance: 18,000; Referee: (Spain) Pedro Pérez |

| 3 February 2013 22 | Málaga | 1 – 1 | Real Zaragoza | Málaga |
| 12:00 | Isco 23' (pen.); Portillo (yellow card) 55'; Weligton (yellow card) 68'; Toulalan (yellow card) 80'; Baptista (yellow card) 82' | Summary | Postiga 13'; Paredes (yellow card) 21'; Abraham (yellow card) 40'; José Mari (yellow card) 64' (yellow-red card) 90+2'; Rodri (yellow card) 81' | Stadium: La Rosaleda; Attendance: 28,000; Referee: (Spain) Alfonso Álvarez |

== Round of 32 ==
| 31 October 2012 First Leg | Real Zaragoza | 1 – 0 | Granada | Zaragoza |
| 20:00 | Săpunaru (yellow card) 33'; Álvaro (yellow card) 58'; Aranda 79' | Summary | Ortiz (yellow card) 39'; Nyom (yellow card) 69'; Mainz (yellow card) 86' | Stadium: La Romareda; Attendance: 11,000; Referee: Alfonso Álvarez |

| 29 November 2012 Second Leg | Granada | 2 – 1 (2 – 2 agg.) | Real Zaragoza | Granada |
| 19:30 | Ighalo 27'; Torje (yellow card) 48'; Mainz 66'; Iriney (yellow card) 79'; Benítez (yellow card) 88' | Summary | Romaric (yellow card) 31'; Postiga (yellow card) 42' (yellow-red card) 59'; José Mari 56'; Álvaro (yellow card) 77'; Săpunaru (yellow card) 81'; Franco (yellow card) 90' | Stadium: Estadio Nuevo Los Cármenes; Attendance: 21,000; Referee: (Spain) Jesús Gil |

== Round of 16 ==
| 13 December 2012 First Leg | Levante | 0 – 1 | Real Zaragoza | Valencia |
| 20:00 | El Zhar (yellow card) 57' | Summary | José Mari (yellow card) 28'; Movilla (yellow card) 64'; Aranda 90+2' | Stadium: Ciutat de València; Attendance: 10,862; Referee: (Spain) Pedro Pérez |

| 9 January 2013 Second Leg | Real Zaragoza | 2 – 0 (3 – 0 agg.) | Levante | Zaragoza |
| 21:30 | Zuculini 23', (yellow card) 24'; Aranda (yellow card) 42'; Montañés 60' | Summary | Ríos (yellow card) 24'; Pallardó (yellow card) 34'; Volta (yellow card) 50'; Rodas (red card) 59' | Stadium: La Romareda; Attendance: 12,000; Referee: (Spain) Javier Estrada |

== Quarter-finals ==
| 16 January 2013 First Leg | Real Zaragoza | 0 – 0 | Sevilla | Zaragoza |
| 19:30 | Álvaro (yellow card) 26'; Paredes (yellow card) 84' | Summary | Navas (yellow card) 40'; Maduro (yellow card) 73' | Stadium: La Romareda; Attendance: 5,000; Referee: (Spain) Fernando Teixeira |

| 23 January 2013 Second Leg | Sevilla | 4 – 0 (4 – 0 agg.) | Real Zaragoza | Seville |
| 19:30 | Spahić (yellow card) 17'; Negredo 36', 67' (pen.); Rakitić 45+3'; Manu 90+2' | Summary | Wilchez (yellow card) 11'; Fernández (red card) 26'; González (yellow card) 49' (yellow-red card) 65'; Săpunaru (yellow card) 69' | Stadium: Ramón Sánchez Pizjuán; Attendance: 20,000; Referee: (Spain) Carlos Velasco |

== Squad ==
Note: Flags indicate national team as defined under FIFA eligibility rules; some limited exceptions apply. Players may hold more than one non-FIFA nationality.

| No. | Pos. | Nation | Player |
|---|---|---|---|
| 1 | GK | ESP | Roberto |
| 2 | MF | ESP | José Movilla |
| 3 | DF | ESP | Javier Paredes |
| 4 | DF | ESP | Álvaro González |
| 5 | DF | ITA | Maurizio Lanzaro |
| 6 | FW | ESP | Rodri |
| 7 | FW | CMR | Henri Bienvenu |
| 8 | FW | ESP | Edu Oriol |
| 9 | FW | POR | Hélder Postiga |
| 10 | MF | ESP | Apono |
| 11 | FW | ESP | Paco Montanes |
| 12 | MF | CIV | Romaric |
| 13 | GK | ARG | Leo Franco |
| 14 | DF | ESP | Jose Manuel Fernandez |
| 15 | MF | ESP | José Mari |

| No. | Pos. | Nation | Player |
|---|---|---|---|
| 16 | DF | NED | Glenn Loovens |
| 17 | MF | SRB | Stefan Babovic |
| 18 | MF | ARG | Lucas Wílchez |
| 19 | DF | ROU | Cristian Sapunaru |
| 20 | MF | ARG | Franco Zuculini |
| 21 | DF | ESP | Abraham Minero |
| 22 | MF | HUN | Ádám Pintér |
| 23 | FW | ESP | Javi Álamo |
| 24 | MF | ESP | Rubén Rochina |
| 25 | FW | ESP | Adria Carmona |
| 26 | FW | ESP | Jorge Ortí |
| 32 | FW | ESP | Víctor Rodríguez |
| 33 | DF | ESP | Carlos Hernández |
| 35 | DF | SRB | Ivan Obradovic |
| 40 | GK | ESP | Kilian Falcón |
