= Hugo Galdeano =

Spanish footballer (born 2014)

Personal information
- Full name: Hugo Galdeano Castillo
- Date of birth: 2014 (age 11–12)
- Position: Midfielder

Team information
- Current team: Barcelona

Youth career
- Years: Team
- Puerto Malagueño
- Barcelona

Hugo Galdeano Castillo (born 2014) is a Spanish footballer who plays as a midfielder for Barcelona.

== Early life ==
Galdeano was born in 2014. Born in Spain, he is a native of Málaga, Spain.

The son of Spanish footballer Apoño, he has been nicknamed "Pulguita" by his father. Growing up, he regarded Spain international Pedri as his football idol.

== Career ==
As a youth player, Galdeano joined the youth academy of Puerto Malagueño. Following his stint there, he joined the youth academy of La Liga side Barcelona, where he played for the club's under-12 team at the Torneo Internacional LALIGA FC FUTURES. Initially, he played for the Blaugrana's seven-a-side football teams before being promoted to their eleven-a-side football teams.

== Style of play ==
Galdeano plays as a midfielder and is left-footed. Spanish newspaper Diario Sur wrote in 2025 that "he possesses brilliant ball-carrying ability with his left foot and great dribbling skills, beating opponents with ease despite his size thanks to his confidence and flair... [the] 'number 8' is also capable of playing as an attacking midfielder or even a 'false nine".
