= Txema Añibarro =

Spanish footballer (born 1979)

Personal information
- Full name: José María Añibarro Astondoa
- Date of birth: 26 July 1979 (age 47)
- Place of birth: Zeberio, Spain
- Height: 1.88 m (6 ft 2 in)
- Position: Defensive midfielder

Youth career
- 1997–1998: Padura
- 1998–1999: Indartsu

Senior career*
Years	Team	Apps	(Gls)
1999–2000	Galdakano		
2000–2002	Arratia		
2002–2003	Lemona		
2003–2004	Aurrerá		
2004–2005	Gernika		
2005–2008	Sestao	93	(4)
2008–2015	Eibar	169	(2)

Managerial career
- 2015–2022: Athletic Bilbao (youth)
- * Club domestic league appearances and goals

José María 'Txema' Añibarro Astondoa (born 26 July 1979) is a Spanish former footballer who played as a defensive midfielder.

He spent his entire professional career – one that consisted of three seasons – with Eibar, having signed at the age of 29.

== Playing career ==
Born in Zeberio, Biscay, Añibarro played amateur football well into his 20s. In the summer of 2005, he joined Sestao River Club of Tercera División, and appeared in 32 matches in his debut season, which ended in promotion.

On 5 June 2008, Añibarro signed with Basque neighbours SD Eibar. He played his first match as a professional on 3 September, starting and being sent off in a 1–0 loss at CD Castellón in the second round of the Copa del Rey. He made his Segunda División debut on the 20th in the 0–0 home draw against RC Celta de Vigo, and scored his first league goal on 25 April 2009, but in a 2–3 home defeat to Real Zaragoza.

Añibarro took part in 25 games in his first season, as the Armeros were relegated to the third tier. He remained a starter in the following years, contributing 27 appearances in the promotion campaign of 2012–13.

On 25 June 2014, after Eibar's promotion to La Liga, The 34-year-old Añibarro renewed his contract for a further year. He only made his debut in the competition on 16 January 2015, coming on as a second half substitute for Borja Ekiza in a 1–1 away draw against Córdoba CF.

== Coaching career ==
Añibarro announced his retirement on 17 June 2015, being immediately appointed coach at Athletic Bilbao's Cadete C team. Seven years later, following Jon Uriarte's election as president, he left the club.

== Career statistics ==
Club	Season	League			Cup		Other		Total	
Club	Season	Division	Apps	Goals	Apps	Goals	Apps	Goals	Apps	Goals
Sestao	2005–06	Tercera División	32	3	—		—		32	3
Sestao	2006–07	Segunda División B	31	1	1	0	—		32	1
Sestao	2007–08	Segunda División B	30	0	1	0	—		31	0
Sestao	Total		93	4	2	0	—		95	4
Eibar	2008–09	Segunda División	25	1	1	0	—		26	1
Eibar	2009–10	Segunda División B	30	0	1	0	4 (Note: Appearances in Segunda División B play-offs)	0	35	0
Eibar	2010–11	Segunda División B	33	1	1	0	4	0	38	1
Eibar	2011–12	Segunda División B	30	0	2	0	2	0	34	0
Eibar	2012–13	Segunda División B	21	0	6	0	6	0	33	0
Eibar	2013–14	Segunda División	15	0	2	0	—		17	0
Eibar	2014–15	La Liga	15	0	1	0	—		16	0
Eibar	Total		169	2	14	0	16	0	199	2
Career total			262	6	16	0	16	0	294	6

== Honours ==
Eibar

- Segunda División: 2013–14
