= Dani Nieto =

Spanish footballer (born 1991)

Personal information
- Full name: Daniel Nieto Vela
- Date of birth: 4 May 1991 (age 35)
- Place of birth: Calvià, Spain
- Height: 1.73 m (5 ft 8 in)
- Position: Winger

Team information
- Current team: Poblense
- Number: 21

Youth career
- 1998–2005: Platges de Calvià
- 2005–2007: Mallorca
- 2007–2010: Espanyol
- 2008–2009: → San Francisco (loan)

Senior career*
Years	Team	Apps	(Gls)
2010–2012	Espanyol B	33	(15)
2011–2012	→ Girona (loan)	34	(6)
2012–2013	Alcorcón	21	(5)
2013–2014	Barcelona B	34	(6)
2014–2015	Eibar	9	(0)
2015–2017	Xanthi	37	(6)
2017–2019	Numancia	42	(2)
2019–2020	Independiente del Valle	16	(1)
2020–2023	Racing de Ferrol	61	(7)
2023	Atlético Baleares	14	(5)
2023	Fuenlabrada	8	(1)
2024	Unionistas	3	(0)
2024–2025	Academia Anzoátegui	2	(0)
2025–	Poblense	31	(6)

International career
2007	Spain U16	1	(0)
- * Club domestic league appearances and goals as of 7 May 2026

Daniel 'Dani' Nieto Vela (born 4 May 1991) is a Spanish footballer who plays for Segunda Federación club Poblense as a winger.

== Club career ==
=== Espanyol ===
Nieto was born in Calvià, Mallorca, Balearic Islands. He graduated from Espanyol's youth setup after playing with local club Mallorca from ages 14–16, and made his senior debut with the reserves of the former in the 2010–11 season, scoring 15 goals in Tercera División.

On 30 June 2011, Nieto moved straight to Segunda División after signing a one-year loan deal with Girona. He played his first match as a professional on 26 August, coming on as a late substitute in a 1–4 home loss against Elche.

Nieto scored his first professional goal on 24 September, netting the last in a 4–2 home win over Las Palmas. He finished the campaign with eight starts and 1,088 minutes of action, as the Catalans narrowly avoided relegation.

=== Alcorcón / Eibar ===
On 4 August 2012, Nieto cut ties with Espanyol and subsequently joined Alcorcón also of the second tier. However, after starting only once with the Madrid side, he moved to Barcelona B on 12 July of the following year.

On 31 July 2014, Nieto signed for Eibar, recently promoted to La Liga– his €75,000 transfer fee was the club's record signing. He made his debut in the competition on 30 August, replacing Ander Capa in the 62nd minute of a 1–2 defeat at Atlético Madrid.

=== Later career ===
On 24 August 2015, Nieto terminated his contract at the Ipurua Municipal Stadium. Two days later, he joined Super League Greece side Xanthi for an undisclosed fee.

On 24 January 2017, free agent Nieto signed a two-and-a-half-year contract with Numancia.

In January 2023, Nieto joined Atlético Baleares until the end of the season after terminating his contract at Racing de Ferrol.

In September 2024, Nieto joined Venezuelan Segunda División club Academia Anzoátegui.

== Career statistics ==
=== Club ===
As of match played 21 March 2021

Appearances and goals by club, season and competition
Club	Season	League			National Cup		Continental		Other		Total	
Club	Season	Division	Apps	Goals	Apps	Goals	Apps	Goals	Apps	Goals	Apps	Goals
Girona (loan)	2011–12	Segunda División	34	6	1	1	—		—		35	7
Alcorcón	2012–13	Segunda División	21	5	2	0	—		2 (Note: Appearance(s) in Promotion Playoffs)	0	25	5
Barcelona B	2013–14	Segunda División	34	6	—		—		—		34	6
Eibar	2014–15	La Liga	9	0	2	0	—		—		11	0
Eibar	2015–16	La Liga	0	0	0	0	—		—		0	0
Eibar	Total		9	0	2	0	0	0	0	0	11	0
Xanthi	2015–16	Super League Greece	25	6	0	0	—		—		25	6
Xanthi	2016–17	Super League Greece	12	0	3	2	—		—		15	2
Xanthi	Total		37	6	3	2	0	0	0	0	40	8
Numancia	2016–17	Segunda División	15	0	0	0	—		—		15	0
Numancia	2017–18	Segunda División	24	2	6	0	—		1	0	31	2
Numancia	2018–19	Segunda División	3	0	0	0	—		—		3	0
Numancia	Total		42	2	6	0	0	0	1	0	49	2
Independiente del Valle	2019	Ecuadorian Serie A	12	1	0	0	2 (Note: Appearance(s) in Copa Sudamericana)	1	—		14	2
Independiente del Valle	2020	Ecuadorian Serie A	4	0	0	0	1 (Note: Appearance(s) in Recopa Sudamericana)	0	—		5	0
Independiente del Valle	Total		16	1	0	0	3	1	0	0	19	2
Racing de Ferrol	2020–21	Segunda División B	14	0	0	0	—		—		14	0
Career total			207	26	14	3	3	1	3	0	227	30

== Honours ==
=== Club ===
Independiente Valle

- Copa Sudamericana: 2019
