= Roberto Jiménez (footballer, born 1986) =

Spanish footballer

Roberto
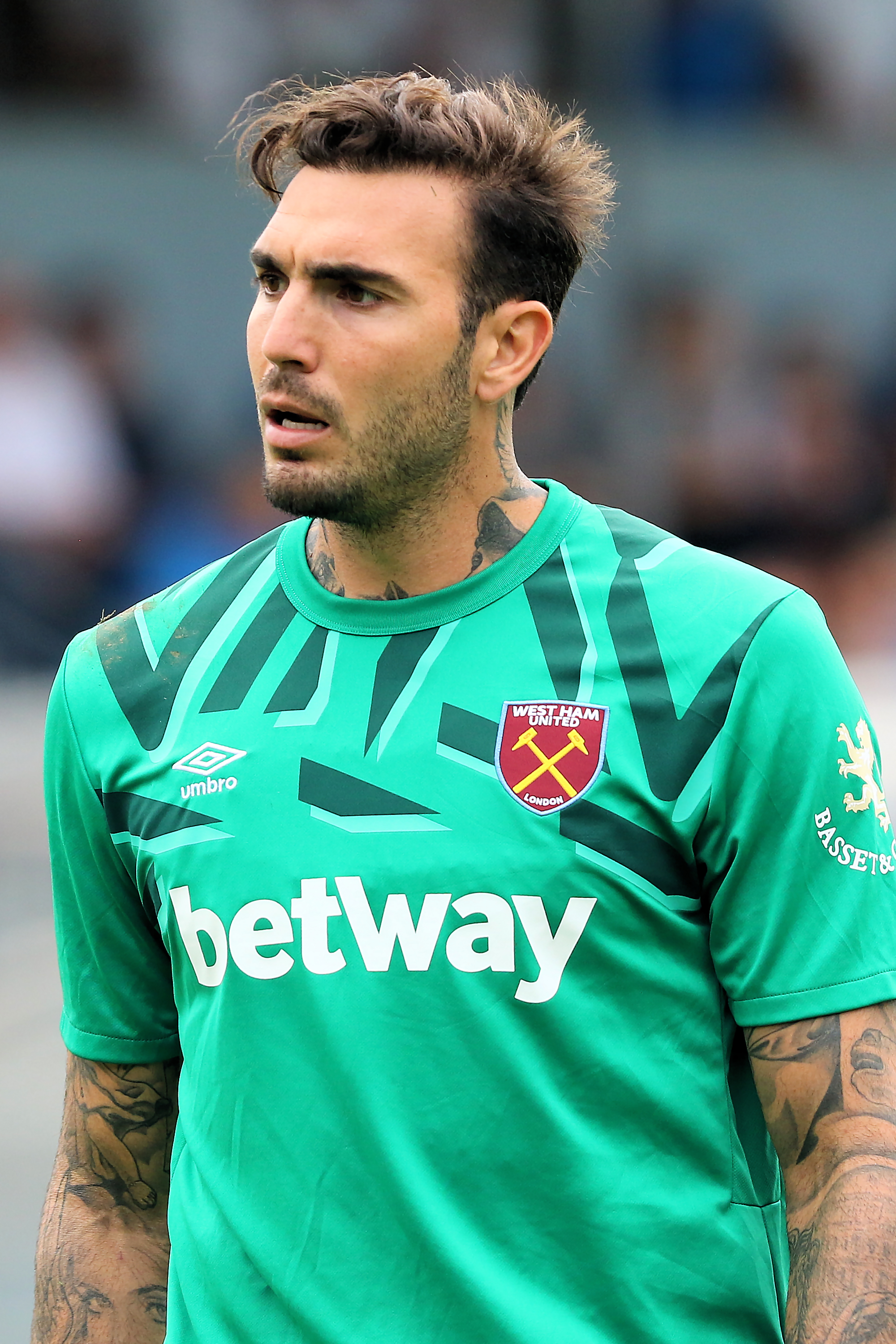
- Roberto with West Ham United in 2019

Personal information
- Full name: Roberto Jiménez Gago
- Date of birth: 10 February 1986 (age 40)
- Place of birth: Madrid, Spain
- Height: 1.92 m (6 ft 4 in)
- Position: Goalkeeper

Youth career
- 1996–2005: Atlético Madrid

Senior career*
Years	Team	Apps	(Gls)
2005–2008	Atlético Madrid B	40	(0)
2005–2008	Atlético Madrid	1	(0)
2007–2008	→ Gimnàstic (loan)	28	(0)
2008–2009	Recreativo	0	(0)
2009–2010	Atlético Madrid	3	(0)
2010	→ Zaragoza (loan)	15	(0)
2010–2011	Benfica	25	(0)
2011–2013	Zaragoza	71	(0)
2013–2014	Atlético Madrid	0	(0)
2013–2014	→ Olympiacos (loan)	32	(0)
2014–2016	Olympiacos	57	(0)
2016–2019	Espanyol	4	(0)
2017–2018	→ Málaga (loan)	34	(0)
2019–2020	West Ham United	8	(0)
2020	→ Alavés (loan)	9	(0)
2020–2022	Valladolid	32	(0)
Total		359	(0)

International career
2003	Spain U17	7	(0)
2004–2005	Spain U18	3	(0)
2006	Spain U19	2	(0)
2007	Spain U20	1	(0)
2007–2008	Spain U21	6	(0)
Medal record
Representing Spain
Men's football
UEFA European Under-17 Championship
Runner-up	2003 Portugal
- * Club domestic league appearances and goals

Roberto Jiménez Gago (Spanish pronunciation: [roˈβeɾto xiˈmeneθ ˈɣaɣo]; born 10 February 1986), known simply as Roberto, is a Spanish former professional footballer who played as a goalkeeper.

He appeared in 150 La Liga matches over eight seasons, for Atlético Madrid (two spells), Zaragoza (twice), Espanyol, Málaga, Alavés and Valladolid. Abroad, he spent three years with Olympiacos where he won the Super League Greece in three consecutive seasons, and also played in Portugal with Benfica and England with West Ham United.

Roberto represented Spain at youth level.

== Club career ==
=== Atlético Madrid ===
An Atlético Madrid youth graduate, Madrid-born Roberto played mainly for the reserves, only receiving the occasional call-up due to suspensions or injuries. After a plague of the latter he made his first-team debut on 22 December 2005, in a 2–1 away loss against CA Osasuna.

In early July 2008, following a Segunda División loan at Gimnàstic de Tarragona, Roberto was deemed surplus to requirements and sold to fellow La Liga club Recreativo de Huelva as part of the deal that sent Florent Sinama Pongolle in the opposite direction – Atlético, however, had an option to rebuy. During his only season, which ended in relegation, he was restricted solely to appearances in the Copa del Rey.

Roberto returned to Atlético on 13 July 2009 after a payment of €1,250,000 to the Andalusians, penning a three-year contract. This happened after the simultaneous departures of Grégory Coupet and Leo Franco.

As first-choice Sergio Asenjo was summoned for the 2009 FIFA U-20 World Cup, Roberto was promoted to the starting XI, his first game being a 5–2 loss at FC Barcelona on 19 September. He got injured shortly after, and when he returned found himself third-choice behind Asenjo and youngster David de Gea; thus, in late January 2010, a loan to struggling Real Zaragoza was arranged until the end of the campaign– he relegated Juan Pablo Carrizo to the bench, helping the Aragonese finally escape relegation.

=== Benfica ===
On 25 June 2010, it was confirmed that S.L. Benfica signed Roberto for a fee of €8.5 million. In his first three official matches – the first against FC Porto in the season's Supertaça Cândido de Oliveira – his performances were poor overall, as the Lisbon club suffered three defeats and he conceded six goals; he was benched for the third Primeira Liga game of the season, at home against Vitória de Setúbal, but had to be brought in after Júlio César was sent off for a foul in the box at the 20-minute mark, and saved the ensuing penalty from Hugo Leal in a 3–0 win.

Subsequently, Roberto fell out of favour at Benfica after the off-season signings of Artur and Eduardo.

=== Zaragoza return ===
On 1 August 2011, Roberto returned to Zaragoza, being transferred for a fee of €8.6 million in a purchase which was almost totally funded by a parent company of Zaragoza, who retained 99% of the player's economic rights. However, it was later reported that a football investment fund was involved in that deal.

In his first season in his second spell, he played all 38 league games as the team again avoided top-flight relegation in the last round. He again started in the 2012–13 campaign, but they returned to the second tier after a four-year stay.

=== Olympiacos ===
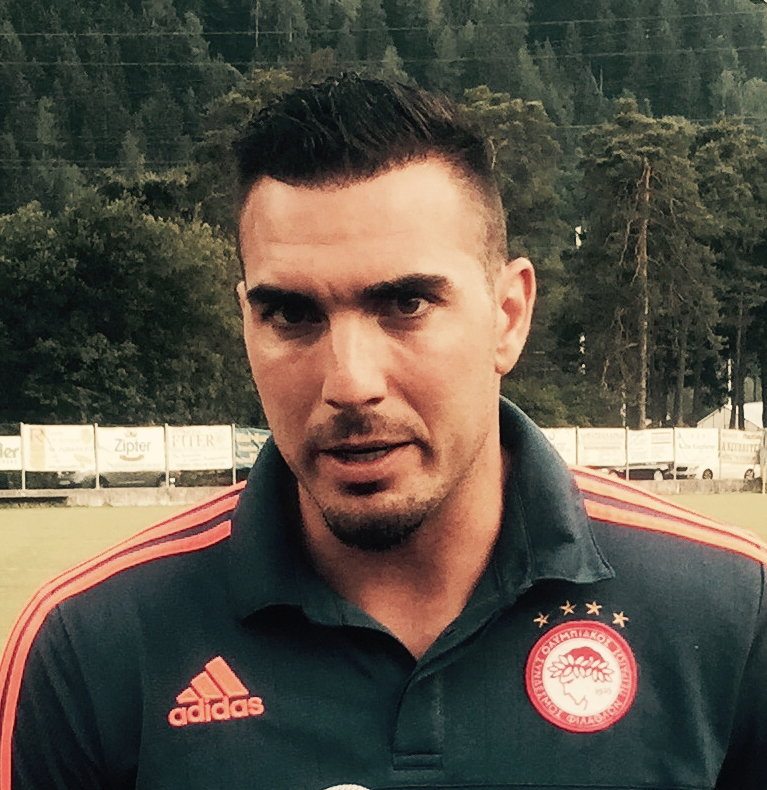
Roberto with Olympiacos in 2015

Roberto returned to Atlético Madrid on 26 July 2013, signing a four-year contract after an arrangement with Benfica and being immediately loaned to Greek side Olympiacos FC. The transfer was questioned by the Portuguese Securities Market Commission, with Benfica explaining that BE Plan, the parent company who originally funded his transfer, defaulted on its obligations, so Zaragoza and Benfica agreed to revert the player's sporting and economic rights, with the latter immediately selling him to Atlético Madrid for €6 million.

On 5 November 2013, Roberto put on a player of the match performance against his former club Benfica, in a 1–0 win in Piraeus in the season's UEFA Champions League. In February of the following year, Olympiacos and Atlético reached an agreement for a permanent €2.5 million transfer, and he signed a four-year contract with the former; prior the official announcement, news regarding the move were announced through the Karaiskakis Stadium loudspeakers during a match against Panionios FC.

Roberto saved several shots in a 1–0 home win over Juventus FC in the Champions League on 22 October 2014, but his team eventually did not progress from the group stage.

=== Espanyol ===
On 22 June 2016, Roberto became new manager Quique Sánchez Flores' first signing at RCD Espanyol, penning a three-year contract for €3 million. On 5 July of the following year, after playing second-fiddle to Diego López, he moved to fellow top-tier club Málaga CF on loan.

Upon his return to the RCDE Stadium, Roberto did not take part in any more league games as López was present in all 38 fixtures.

=== West Ham United ===
On 31 May 2019, Roberto signed for West Ham United on a two-year deal for a free transfer commencing on 1 July. He made his full debut on 27 August, in a 2–0 win against Newport County in the second round of the EFL Cup. His maiden Premier League appearance took place on 28 September, when he replaced the injured Łukasz Fabiański 34 minutes into an eventual 2–2 away draw to AFC Bournemouth. He retained his place in goal with Fabianski's injury predicted to keep him out for up to two months, and several of his performances attracted criticism after he was deemed to be at fault for goals by Everton, Sheffield United, Newcastle United and Burnley, the latter where he pushed the ball into his own net for the opposition's third goal in a 3–0 victory. Following yet more poor form he was dropped to the bench, with third-choice David Martin playing the fixture against Chelsea on 30 November. In February 2020, former team manager Manuel Pellegrini blamed the player's form as part of the reason for his sacking the previous December.

After only ten competitive games for West Ham, on 20 January 2020 Roberto joined Deportivo Alavés on loan until the end of the season. During his brief tenure, in which he was praised for his professional approach even though he played second-fiddle to Fernando Pacheco, he conceded 19 goals.

=== Valladolid ===
In late August 2020, Roberto joined Real Valladolid on a free transfer and a three-year contract. He made his debut on 20 September in a 2–0 loss at Real Betis after Jordi Masip tested positive for COVID-19, and played roughly a third of the season's fixtures despite contracting the same virus in March. In 2021–22, with Pucela in the second division, new manager Pacheta played him for the first 19 games before switching to Masip.

Roberto announced his retirement on 5 September 2022 at the age of 36, through his social media.

== International career ==
Roberto won the first of his six caps for Spain at under-21 level on 5 June 2007, in a 1–0 away victory over Georgia for the 2009 UEFA European Championship qualifiers.

== Career statistics ==
Appearances and goals by club, season and competition
Club	Season	League			National cup		League cup		Europe		Total	
Club	Season	Division	Apps	Goals	Apps	Goals	Apps	Goals	Apps	Goals	Apps	Goals
Atlético Madrid B	2005–06	Segunda División B	5	0	—		—		—		5	0
Atlético Madrid B	2006–07	Segunda División B	35	0	—		—		—		35	0
Atlético Madrid B	Total		40	0	—		—		—		40	0
Atlético Madrid	2004–05	La Liga	0	0	0	0	—		0	0	0	0
Atlético Madrid	2005–06	La Liga	1	0	0	0	—		—		1	0
Atlético Madrid	2006–07	La Liga	0	0	0	0	—		—		0	0
Atlético Madrid	Total		1	0	0	0	—		0	0	1	0
Gimnàstic (loan)	2007–08	Segunda División	28	0	0	0	—		—		28	0
Recreativo	2008–09	La Liga	0	0	2	0	—		—		2	0
Atlético Madrid	2009–10	La Liga	3	0	0	0	—		1	0	4	0
Zaragoza (loan)	2009–10	La Liga	15	0	0	0	—		—		15	0
Benfica	2010–11	Primeira Liga	25	0	0	0	1	0	14	0	40	0
Zaragoza	2011–12	La Liga	38	0	2	0	—		—		40	0
Zaragoza	2012–13	La Liga	33	0	0	0	—		—		33	0
Zaragoza	Total		71	0	2	0	—		—		73	0
Olympiacos (loan)	2013–14	Super League Greece	32	0	0	0	—		8	0	40	0
Olympiacos	2014–15	Super League Greece	29	0	3	0	—		8	0	40	0
Olympiacos	2015–16	Super League Greece	28	0	0	0	—		8	0	36	0
Olympiacos	Total		89	0	3	0	—		24	0	116	0
Espanyol	2016–17	La Liga	4	0	2	0	—		—		6	0
Espanyol	2018–19	La Liga	0	0	6	0	—		—		6	0
Espanyol	Total		4	0	8	0	—		—		12	0
Málaga (loan)	2017–18	La Liga	34	0	0	0	—		—		34	0
West Ham United	2019–20	Premier League	8	0	0	0	2	0	—		10	0
Alavés (loan)	2019–20	La Liga	9	0	0	0	—		—		9	0
Valladolid	2020–21	La Liga	13	0	4	0	—		—		17	0
Valladolid	2021–22	Segunda División	19	0	2	0	—		—		21	0
Valladolid	Total		32	0	6	0	—		—		38	0
Career total			359	0	21	0	3	0	39	0	422	0

== Honours ==
Benfica

- Taça da Liga: 2010–11
- Supertaça Cândido de Oliveira runner-up: 2010

Olympiacos

- Super League Greece: 2013–14, 2014–15, 2015–16
- Greek Football Cup: 2014–15; runner-up 2015–16

Spain U17

- UEFA European Under-17 Championship runner-up: 2003

Individual

- Super League Greece Goalkeeper of the Season 2013–14, 2015–16
- Super League Greece Team of the Season: 2013–14, 2015–16
