= Ángel Lafita =

Spanish footballer (born 1984)

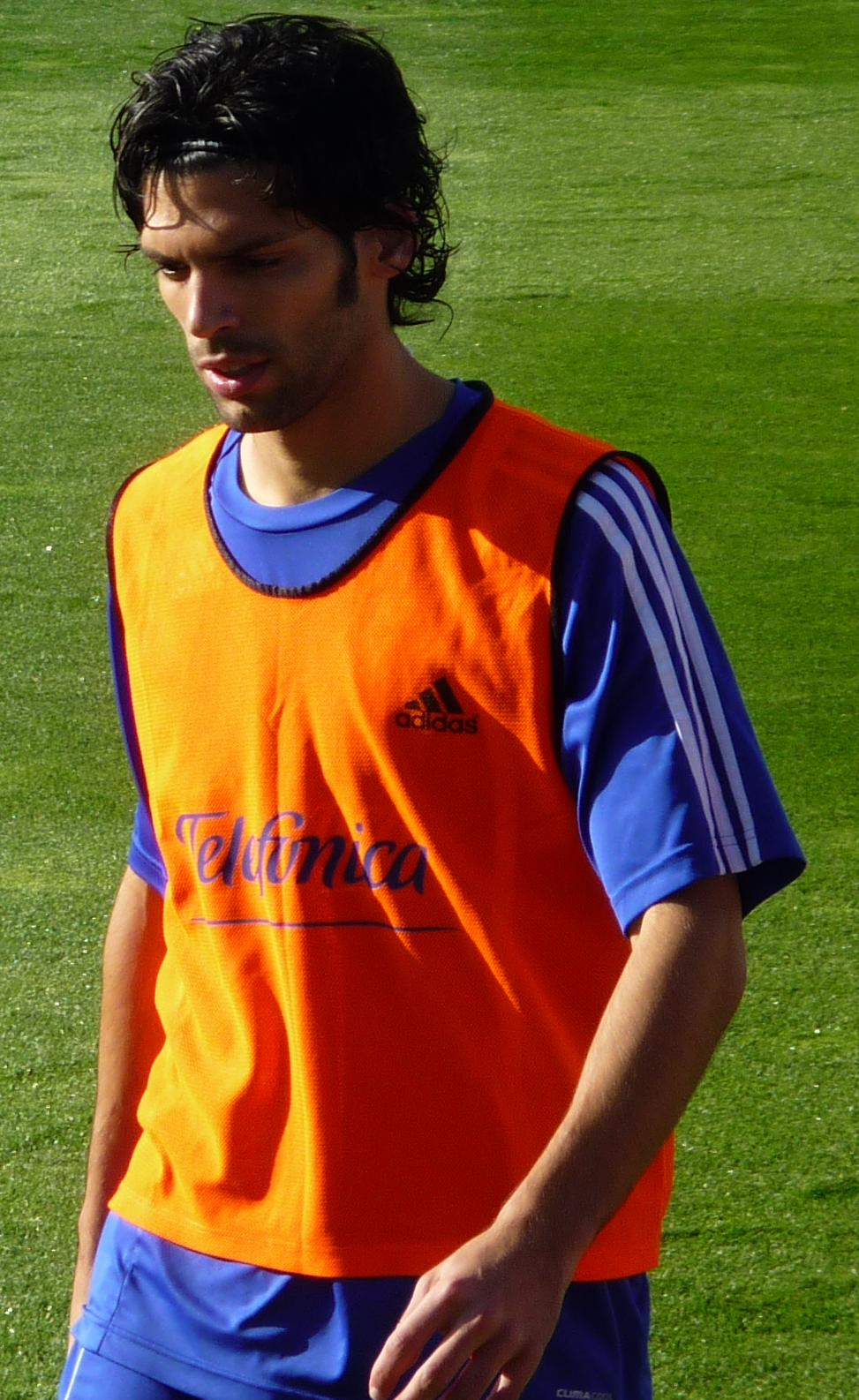
- Lafita training with Zaragoza in 2009

Personal information
- Full name: Ángel Imanol Lafita Castillo
- Date of birth: 7 August 1984 (age 42)
- Place of birth: Zaragoza, Spain
- Height: 1.88 m (6 ft 2 in)
- Position: Winger

Youth career
- Zaragoza

Senior career*
Years	Team	Apps	(Gls)
2003–2005	Zaragoza B	63	(6)
2005–2008	Zaragoza	41	(1)
2007–2008	→ Deportivo La Coruña (loan)	24	(3)
2008–2009	Deportivo La Coruña	33	(8)
2009–2012	Zaragoza	91	(10)
2012–2016	Getafe	84	(14)
2016–2017	Al Jazira	7	(0)
Total		343	(42)
- * Club domestic league appearances and goals

Ángel Imanol Lafita Castillo (born 7 August 1984) is a Spanish former professional footballer. Usually a winger, being comfortable on both sides of the pitch, he could also play as an attacking midfielder.

He amassed La Liga totals of 273 matches and 36 goals over 11 seasons, representing in the competition Zaragoza (two spells), Deportivo and Getafe.

== Club career ==
=== Zaragoza and Deportivo ===
A product of hometown Real Zaragoza's youth system, Lafita was born in Zaragoza, being promoted from their reserves after stellar performances during the 2004–05 season and making his first-team – and La Liga – debut on 28 August 2005 in a 0–0 draw at Atlético Madrid. He went on to become an important element in 2006–07, helping the Aragonese to a berth in the UEFA Cup after contributing 28 games and one goal, in a 2–0 away win against Racing de Santander on 10 December 2006.

Lafita was loaned to Deportivo de La Coruña in August 2007, with an option to buy at the end of the campaign. After helping the Galician side to reach the UEFA Intertoto Cup (with the subsequent UEFA Cup qualification), scoring three consecutive goals in February–March 2008, the clause was activated in July for €2 million.

After being troubled with physical problems at the start of 2008–09, Lafita returned to Depor in late October 2008. He netted four times in his first seven games, including a brace against Real Betis in a 3–0 away victory on 2 November.

In July 2009, Zaragoza paid the sum requested to rebuy the player but Deportivo did not compel, claiming both clubs had agreed on a higher fee (€3.5 million). Lafita still played the first match of the new season, a 3–2 loss at Real Madrid but, in September, the Liga Nacional de Fútbol Profesional deemed him a Zaragoza player.

Lafita started throughout most of the 2010–11 campaign, but also spent one month on the sidelines with a knee injury. On 30 April 2011, he scored twice in a 3–2 away win over Real Madrid, being also involved in the other goal as he was brought down in the box by Ricardo Carvalho, which resulted in a converted penalty, as Zaragoza finally escaped relegation.

=== Getafe ===
On 29 May 2012, after failing to negotiate a new contract, Lafita agreed to join Getafe CF on a four-year deal. His first goal for his new team arrived on 18 November, in a 2–1 home defeat of Real Valladolid.

Lafita scored his sixth and seventh goals of 2013–14 on 3 May 2014, helping the Madrid outskirts side to a 2–2 away draw against FC Barcelona; his second in that game came in the 92nd minute. On 21 December, early into the second half of an eventual 1–1 draw at Granada CF, he suffered cruciate ligament damage to his right knee, being sidelined for the rest of the season.

=== Al Jazira ===
In January 2016, aged 31, Lafita moved abroad for the first time, signing a two-and-a-half-year deal at Al Jazira Club in the United Arab Emirates. He made his competitive debut on the 8th, in a 2–2 draw at Al Wasl FC.

Lafita announced his retirement in April 2018.

== Personal life ==
Football ran in Lafita's family: his uncle, Francisco Villarroya, played professionally for Real Madrid, Deportivo and Zaragoza, also being a Spanish international. His father Juan appeared with Zaragoza's first team in the late 70s/early 80s, also representing CD Castellón, and younger brother Ignacio played with Zaragoza B as well as neighbours SD Huesca.
