= Xabi Irureta =

Spanish footballer

Personal information
- Full name: Xabier Iruretagoiena Arantzamendi
- Date of birth: 21 March 1986 (age 40)
- Place of birth: Ondarroa, Spain
- Height: 1.80 m (5 ft 11 in)
- Position: Goalkeeper

Youth career
- Real Unión

Senior career*
Years	Team	Apps	(Gls)
2005–2006	Real Unión	2	(0)
2006–2007	Aurrerá		
2007–2009	Eibar B	48	(0)
2009–2016	Eibar	205	(0)
2016–2017	Zaragoza	17	(0)
2018	Delhi Dynamos	7	(0)
2018–2020	S.S. Reyes	48	(0)
2020–2021	Villarrubia	12	(0)
2021–2022	Racing Murcia	32	(0)
2022–2023	La Unión Atlético	25	(0)
Total		396	(0)

International career
2014	Basque Country	1	(0)
- * Club domestic league appearances and goals

Xabier 'Xabi' Iruretagoiena Arantzamendi (born 21 March 1986), commonly known as Irureta, is a Spanish former professional footballer who played as a goalkeeper.

He spent most of his 18-year career with Eibar, representing the club in all three major levels of Spanish football while appearing in 229 matches in all competitions.

== Club career ==
=== Eibar ===
Born in Ondarroa, Biscay, Irureta made his senior debut with local Real Unión in the 2005–06 season, in the Segunda División B. In summer 2006, he moved to amateurs CD Aurrerá Ondarroa also in his native Basque Country.

In July 2007, Irureta joined SD Eibar, being initially assigned to the reserves in the Tercera División. He played his first game as a professional on 30 May 2009, starting in a 3–0 Segunda División away loss against Xerez CD, and made a further three appearances during the campaign as the side suffered relegation after finishing in 21st position.

Irureta was definitely promoted to the main squad in July 2009, being named first choice ahead of Zigor Goikuria. In 2012–13, he appeared in 46 matches (34 in the league, 4,126 minutes of action) to help Eibar return to the second division after a four-year absence.

On 20 February 2014, Irureta signed a new two-year deal with the club, which was promoted to La Liga for the first time ever. He made his debut in the competition on 24 August aged 28, in a 1–0 home victory over Real Sociedad.

=== Zaragoza ===
On 20 July 2016, the free agent Irureta agreed to a two-year contract at Real Zaragoza of the second tier. On 1 September of the following year, after losing his starting position to youth graduate Álvaro Ratón, he left.

=== Delhi Dynamos ===
Irureta moved abroad on 4 January 2018, joining Indian Super League franchise Delhi Dynamos FC. He made his debut in the competition three days later, in a 2–2 away draw against Chennaiyin FC.

=== Later career ===
Subsequently, Irureta competed in the Spanish lower leagues and amateur divisions, representing UD San Sebastián de los Reyes, Villarrubia CF, Racing Murcia FC and FC La Unión Atlético.

== Career statistics ==
Appearances and goals by club, season and competition
Club	Season	League			Cup		Other		Total	
Club	Season	Division	Apps	Goals	Apps	Goals	Apps	Goals	Apps	Goals
Real Unión	2004–05	Segunda División B	2	0	0	0	—		2	0
Eibar	2007–08	Segunda División	0	0	0	0	—		0	0
Eibar	2008–09	Segunda División	4	0	0	0	—		4	0
Eibar	2009–10	Segunda División B	26	0	1	0	0	0	27	0
Eibar	2010–11	Segunda División B	32	0	1	0	4 (Note: Appearances in Segunda División B play-offs)	0	37	0
Eibar	2011–12	Segunda División B	33	0	0	0	2	0	35	0
Eibar	2012–13	Segunda División B	34	0	6	0	6	0	46	0
Eibar	2013–14	Segunda División	39	0	0	0	—		39	0
Eibar	2014–15	La Liga	33	0	0	0	—		33	0
Eibar	2015–16	La Liga	4	0	4	0	—		8	0
Eibar	Total		205	0	12	0	12	0	229	0
Zaragoza	2016–17	Segunda División	17	0	0	0	—		17	0
Delhi Dynamos	2017–18	Indian Super League	7	0	1	0	—		8	0
S.S. Reyes	2018–19	Segunda División B	25	0	—		—		25	0
S.S. Reyes	2019–20	Segunda División B	23	0	2	0	—		25	0
S.S. Reyes	Total		48	0	2	0	—		50	0
Villarrubia	2020–21	Segunda División B	12	0	—		—		12	0
Racing Murcia	2021–22	Tercera División RFEF	32	0	—		2 (Note: Appearances in Tercera Federación play-offs)	0	34	0
La Unión Atlético	2022–23	Tercera Federación	25	0	—		6	0	31	0
Career total			348	0	15	0	20	0	383	0

== Honours ==
Eibar

- Segunda División: 2013–14

Individual

- Ricardo Zamora Trophy (Segunda División): 2013–14
