= Txusta =

Spanish footballer (born 1986)

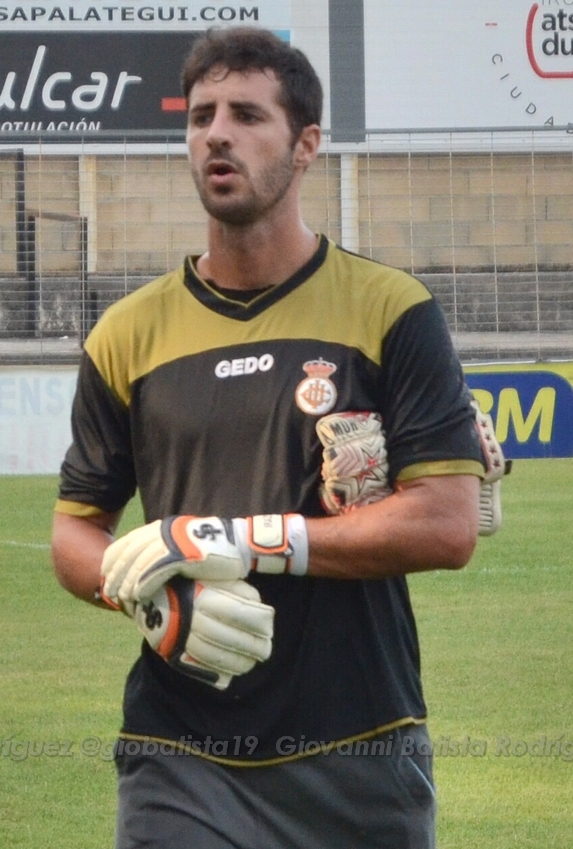
- Txusta with Real Unión in 2018

Personal information
- Full name: Jon Irazustabarrena Lizarralde
- Date of birth: 30 April 1986 (age 40)
- Place of birth: Usurbil, Spain
- Height: 1.83 m (6 ft 0 in)
- Position: Goalkeeper

Youth career
- Real Sociedad

Senior career*
Years	Team	Apps	(Gls)
2003–2004	Real Sociedad B	3	(0)
2005–2007	Beasain		
2007–2008	Real Sociedad B	1	(0)
2008–2009	Beasain	26	(0)
2009–2010	Eibar B	11	(0)
2010–2011	Lagun Onak	31	(0)
2011–2013	Beasain	59	(0)
2013–2015	Eibar	6	(0)
2015–2016	Real Unión	36	(0)
2016–2018	Barakaldo	61	(0)
2018–2025	Real Unión	173	(0)
- * Club domestic league appearances and goals as of 24 May 2025

Jon Irazustabarrena Lizarralde (born 30 April 1986), known as Txusta, is a Spanish footballer who plays as a goalkeeper.

== Club career ==
Born in Usurbil, Gipuzkoa, Txusta graduated from Real Sociedad's youth system, and made his debut with the reserves in the 2003–04 season, in the Segunda División B. In 2005, he signed for neighbouring SD Beasain from Tercera División.

Txusta was recalled by Sanse in summer 2007, but after being sparingly used he returned to Beasain in July 2008. In August 2009 he joined another reserve team, SD Eibar B also in the fourth division; he remained in that tier the following three years, representing CD Lagun Onak and Beasain.

On 29 January 2013, Txusta signed with division three club SD Eibar. He made four appearances during the campaign, as they returned to Segunda División after a four-year absence.

On 31 May 2014, as the Basque side were already promoted to La Liga, the 28-year-old Txusta played his first match as a professional, starting in a 1–0 home win against CD Lugo. Roughly a month later, he renewed his contract for a further year.

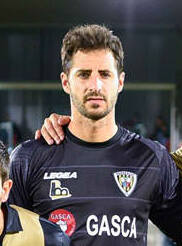
Txusta with Barakaldo, 2017

Txusta signed for third-tier Real Unión in July 2015, after being released by Eibar. On 6 July 2016, he joined Barakaldo CF in the same league.

On 29 May 2018, Txusta returned to Unión, agreeing to a two-year deal.

== Career statistics ==
As of match played 24 May 2025

Appearances and goals by club, season and competition
Club	Season	League			Cup		Other		Total	
Club	Season	Division	Apps	Goals	Apps	Goals	Apps	Goals	Apps	Goals
Eibar	2012–13	Segunda División B	4	0	0	0	0	0	4	0
Eibar	2013–14	Segunda División	2	0	0	0	—		2	0
Eibar	2014–15	La Liga	0	0	2	0	—		2	0
Eibar	Total		6	0	2	0	0	0	8	0
Real Unión	2015–16	Segunda División B	36	0	1	0	—		37	0
Barakaldo	2016–17	Segunda División B	27	0	2	0	—		29	0
Barakaldo	2017–18	Segunda División B	34	0	—		—		8	0
Barakaldo	Total		61	0	2	0	—		63	0
Real Unión	2018–19	Segunda División B	34	0	—		2	0	36	0
Real Unión	2019–20	Segunda División B	15	0	—		—		15	0
Real Unión	2020–21	Segunda División B	19	0	—		6	0	25	0
Real Unión	2021–22	Primera División RFEF	34	0	0	0	—		34	0
Real Unión	2022–23	Primera Federación	36	0	1	0	0	0	31	0
Real Unión	2023–24	Primeira Federación	27	0	—		0	0	27	0
Real Unión	2024–25	Primeira Federación	2	0	—		—		2	0
Real Unión	Total		167	0	1	0	8	0	176	0
Career total			270	0	6	0	8	0	284	0
