= Abraham Minero =

Spanish footballer (born 1986)

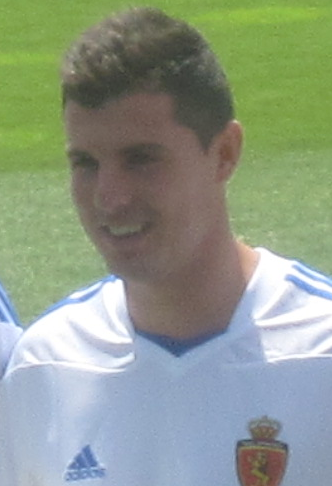
- Minero being presented at Zaragoza

Personal information
- Full name: Abraham Minero Fernández
- Date of birth: 22 February 1986 (age 40)
- Place of birth: Granollers, Spain
- Height: 1.74 m (5 ft 9 in)
- Position: Left-back

Youth career
- 2003–2005: Granollers

Senior career*
| Years | Team | Apps | (Gls) |
| 2004–2006 | Granollers | 28 | (1) |
| 2006–2007 | Figueres | 0 | (0) |
| 2006–2007 | → Peralada (loan) | 13 | (1) |
| 2007–2008 | Blanes | | |
| 2008–2010 | Sant Andreu | 68 | (2) |
| 2010–2011 | Barcelona B | 24 | (0) |
| 2011–2017 | Zaragoza | 102 | (2) |
| 2014–2015 | → Eibar (loan) | 22 | (1) |
| 2016–2017 | → Levante (loan) | 20 | (0) |
| 2017–2019 | Gimnàstic | 84 | (0) |
| 2019–2020 | Racing Santander | 16 | (0) |
| 2020–2021 | Lleida Esportiu | 19 | (0) |
| 2021–2022 | Ebro | 22 | (0) |
| Total | | 418 | (7) |
- * Club domestic league appearances and goals

Abraham Minero Fernández (born 22 February 1986) is a Spanish former professional footballer who played as a left-back.

== Club career ==
Born in Granollers, Barcelona, Catalonia, Minero played amateur football until the age of 22. He first arrived in the Segunda División B in 2008, joining UE Sant Andreu.

On 6 August 2010, Minero signed a one-year deal with FC Barcelona B of Segunda División. He appeared in his first match as a professional later that month, coming on as a second-half substitute in a 2–1 away win against RC Celta de Vigo.

On 6 June 2011, Minero was released by the Catalans and joined La Liga side Real Zaragoza on 2 July, for three years. He made his debut in the competition on 28 August, starting in the 0–6 home loss to Real Madrid.

On 4 March 2012, Minero scored his first professional goal, in the 93rd minute for a 2–1 home victory over Villarreal CF. On 27 February of the following year he renewed his contract with the Aragonese club, running until 2017.

Minero made 35 appearances in his second season, which ended in relegation. On 2 August 2014 he moved to SD Eibar, recently promoted to the top flight, in a season-long loan.

After returning to Zaragoza, Minero moved to Levante UD on 7 July 2016 in a one-year loan deal. On 6 July of the following year, he signed a permanent two-year contract with Gimnàstic de Tarragona also of the second tier.

On 27 June 2019, having suffered relegation, Minero agreed to a two-year deal at Racing de Santander who had just returned to the second division.

== Career statistics ==
Appearances and goals by club, season and competition
| Club | Season | League | | | National Cup | | Other | | Total | |
| Club | Season | Division | Apps | Goals | Apps | Goals | Apps | Goals | Apps | Goals |
|---|---|---|---|---|---|---|---|---|---|---|
| Sant Andreu | 2008–09 | Segunda División B | 26 | 0 | 1 | 0 | 2 (Note: Appearances in Segunda División B play-offs) | 0 | 29 | 0 |
| Sant Andreu | 2009–10 | Segunda División B | 34 | 2 | 2 | 0 | 6 | 0 | 42 | 2 |
| Sant Andreu | Total | | 60 | 2 | 3 | 0 | 8 | 0 | 71 | 2 |
| Barcelona B | 2010–11 | Segunda División | 24 | 0 | — | | — | | 24 | 0 |
| Zaragoza | 2011–12 | La Liga | 22 | 1 | 2 | 0 | — | | 24 | 1 |
| Zaragoza | 2012–13 | La Liga | 35 | 0 | 4 | 0 | — | | 39 | 0 |
| Zaragoza | 2013–14 | Segunda División | 24 | 0 | 1 | 0 | — | | 25 | 0 |
| Zaragoza | 2015–16 | Segunda División | 21 | 1 | 1 | 0 | — | | 22 | 1 |
| Zaragoza | Total | | 102 | 2 | 8 | 0 | 0 | 0 | 110 | 2 |
| Eibar (loan) | 2014–15 | La Liga | 22 | 1 | 1 | 0 | — | | 23 | 1 |
| Levante (loan) | 2016–17 | Segunda División | 20 | 0 | 0 | 0 | — | | 20 | 0 |
| Gimnàstic | 2017–18 | Segunda División | 30 | 0 | 0 | 0 | — | | 30 | 0 |
| Gimnàstic | 2018–19 | Segunda División | 34 | 0 | 0 | 0 | — | | 34 | 0 |
| Gimnàstic | Total | | 64 | 0 | 0 | 0 | 0 | 0 | 64 | 0 |
| Racing Santander | 2019–20 | Segunda División | 16 | 0 | 1 | 0 | — | | 17 | 0 |
| Lleida Esportiu | 2020–21 | Segunda División B | 19 | 0 | 0 | 0 | — | | 19 | 0 |
| Ebro | 2021–22 | Segunda División RFEF | 22 | 0 | 0 | 0 | 3 (Note: Appearances in Copa Federación de España) | 0 | 25 | 0 |
| Career total | | | 349 | 5 | 13 | 0 | 11 | 0 | 373 | 5 |

== Honours ==
Levante

- Segunda División: 2016–17
