= Kevin Lacruz =

Spanish footballer

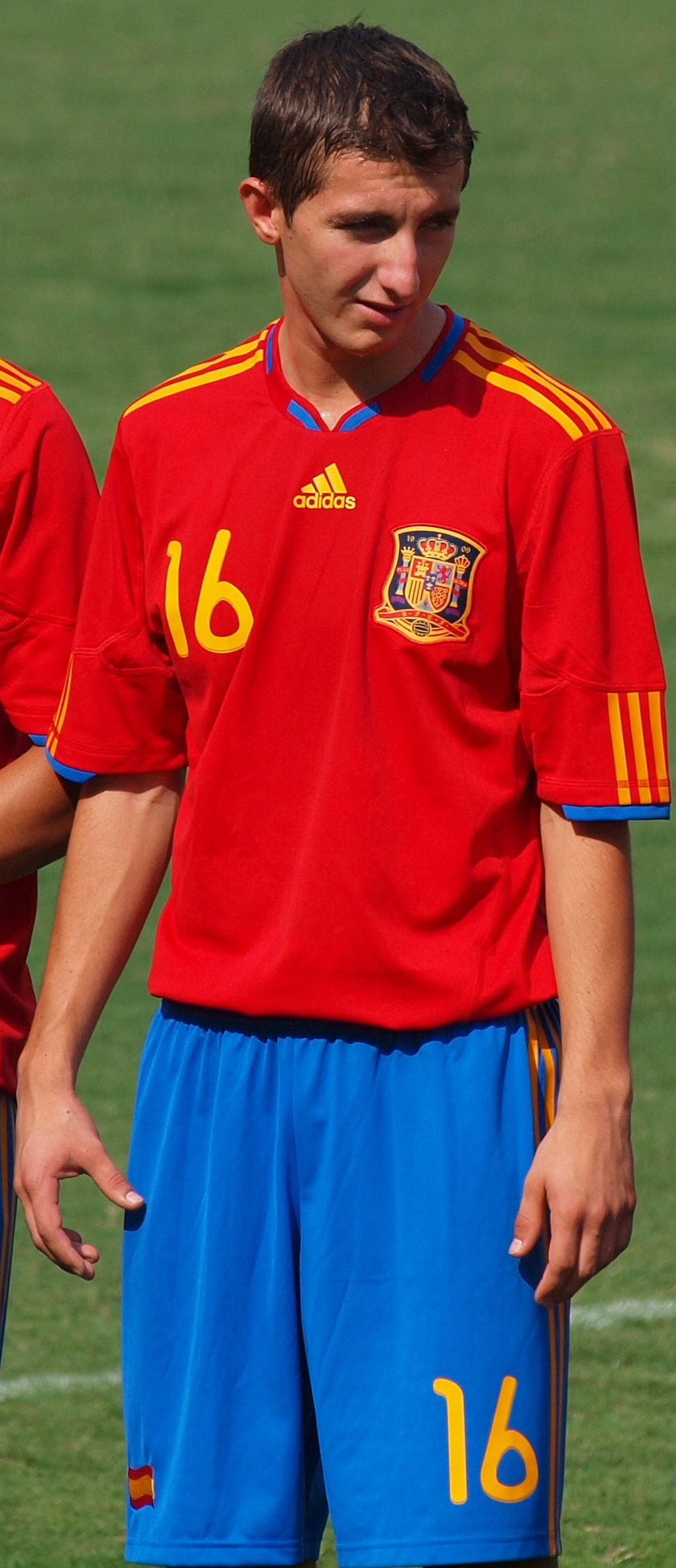

Personal information
- Full name: Kevin Lacruz Coscolín
- Date of birth: 13 February 1992 (age 34)
- Place of birth: Zaragoza, Spain
- Height: 1.78 m (5 ft 10 in)
- Positions: Right-back; midfielder

Youth career
- 2001–2005: Ebro
- 2005–2009: Zaragoza

Senior career*
| Years | Team | Apps | (Gls) |
| 2009–2013 | Zaragoza B | 105 | (13) |
| 2010–2013 | Zaragoza | 6 | (0) |
| 2013–2014 | Betis B | 34 | (2) |
| 2014–2015 | Guadalajara | 26 | (0) |
| 2015–2017 | Ebro | 71 | (12) |
| 2017–2018 | Badalona | 23 | (2) |
| 2018–2019 | Ejea | 27 | (1) |
| 2019–2020 | Barakaldo | 9 | (0) |
| 2020 | Langreo | 4 | (0) |
| 2020–2023 | Teruel | 83 | (2) |
| 2023–2024 | Ejea | 25 | (0) |
| Total | | 413 | (32) |

International career
| 2008–2009 | Spain U17 | 14 | (0) |
| 2010 | Spain U18 | 2 | (0) |
| 2010 | Spain U19 | 4 | (1) |
- * Club domestic league appearances and goals

Kevin Lacruz Coscolín (born 13 February 1992) is a Spanish former professional footballer who played as a right-back or a midfielder.

== Club career ==
Born in Zaragoza, Aragon, Lacruz joined hometown club Real Zaragoza's academy in 2005, aged 13. At only 17 years and 157 days, he made his professional debut, coming on as a substitute for Jermaine Pennant at the hour mark of a 4–1 La Liga away loss against Sevilla FC on 12 September 2009 and being the second youngest player ever to appear in the league for the team, after Moisés. He would spend several seasons mainly registered with the reserve side, however.

On 15 July 2013, Lacruz joined Real Betis, being assigned to their reserves in the Tercera División. He terminated his contract on 19 August of the following day, and signed with CD Guadalajara later that day.

Lacruz remained in the lower and amateur leagues until his retirement in 2024.

== Honours ==
Spain U17

- FIFA U-17 World Cup third place: 2009
