= Franco Zuculini =

Argentine footballer (born 1990)

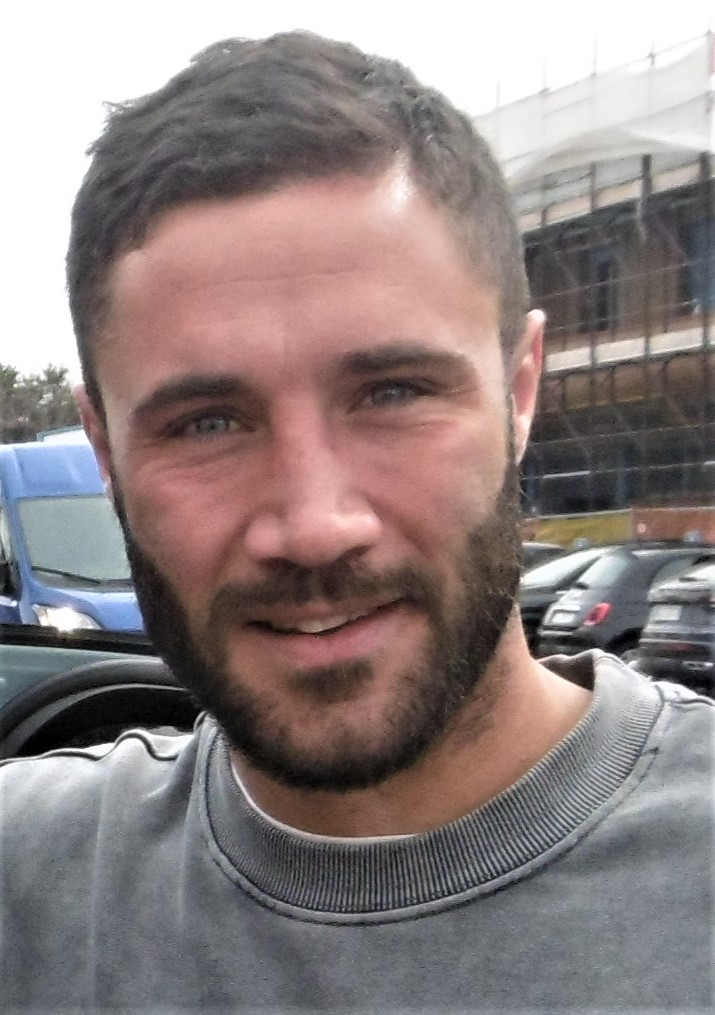
- Zuculini in 2023

Personal information
- Date of birth: 5 September 1990 (age 36)
- Place of birth: La Rioja, Argentina
- Height: 1.75 m (5 ft 9 in)
- Position: Defensive midfielder

Youth career
- Racing Club

Senior career*
| Years | Team | Apps | (Gls) |
| 2008–2009 | Racing Club | 38 | (2) |
| 2009–2012 | 1899 Hoffenheim | 7 | (1) |
| 2010–2011 | → Genoa (loan) | 4 | (0) |
| 2011 | → Racing Club (loan) | 15 | (0) |
| 2011–2012 | → Zaragoza (loan) | 21 | (0) |
| 2012–2013 | Zaragoza | 16 | (1) |
| 2014 | Arsenal Sarandí | 12 | (0) |
| 2014–2016 | Bologna | 29 | (3) |
| 2016–2018 | Hellas Verona | 25 | (0) |
| 2018–2019 | Colón | 15 | (0) |
| 2019–2020 | Venezia | 18 | (0) |
| 2020–2021 | Defensor Sporting | 13 | (1) |
| 2021–2023 | SPAL | 9 | (0) |

International career
| 2007 | Argentina U17 | 4 | (0) |
| 2009 | Argentina U20 | 6 | (0) |
| 2009 | Argentina | 1 | (0) |
- * Club domestic league appearances and goals as of 19 May 2023

Franco Zuculini (born 5 September 1990) is an Argentine footballer who plays as a defensive midfielder.

== Club career ==
=== Racing Club ===
Born in La Rioja, Zuculini made his professional debut with Racing Club de Avellaneda on 13 April 2008 at not yet 18, starting in a 1–0 home win against Arsenal de Sarandí for the Primera División championship.

He appeared in 29 league matches and scored two goals in his first full season, helping his team narrowly avoid relegation.

=== Hoffenheim ===
On 26 June 2009, Zuculini signed with TSG 1899 Hoffenheim in Germany. He appeared in only seven Bundesliga games during his short spell, scoring on 24 October in a 3–0 home victory over 1. FC Nürnberg after coming on as a second half substitute.

Subsequently, Zuculini began a series of loans which saw him appear for Genoa C.F.C. in Italy, former club Racing and Spain's Real Zaragoza.

=== Real Zaragoza ===
On 12 August 2011, Zaragoza announced the signing of Zuculini on a season-long loan, with a view to a permanent transfer later in the year. He made his La Liga debut 16 days later, starting and featuring 52 minutes in a 0–6 home loss to Real Madrid.

Zuculini agreed to a three-year deal with the Aragonese in the subsequent off-season, He opened his scoring account (two in all competitions) for the side on 10 December 2012 in a 2–0 away defeat of Rayo Vallecano which was also the 5,000 goal in their history, being released at the end of the campaign after it ended in relegation.

=== Arsenal de Sarandí ===
In February 2013, Zuculini suffered a knee ligament injury that ended his season. While recovering from the operation, Arsenal de Sarandí allowed him to get into exercise programs and train along with the team players; in January 2014, after a nearly one-year period of inactivity, he signed for six months with the club.

=== Return to Italy ===
On 8 July 2014, Zuculini joined Italian side Bologna F.C. 1909 on a two-year contract. He scored three times from 28 appearances in his first season, helping to promotion to Serie A.

Exactly two years after arriving at the Stadio Renato Dall'Ara, Zuculini returned to the Serie B when he signed for Hellas Verona F.C. as a free agent on a reported one-year contract, with an option for another year. On 12 July 2017, he agreed to a new two-year deal.

=== Later years ===
Zuculini returned to his homeland after four years on 27 July 2018, joining Club Atlético Colón for free. He went back to the Italian second division one year later, agreeing to a one-year deal at Venezia F.C. with an option for a second one.

On 26 August 2021, he returned to Italy once again and signed a two-year contract with SPAL.

== International career ==
In January 2009, Zuculini was selected for the Argentina under-20 team for the 2009 South American Youth Championship in Venezuela. He was named by full side manager Diego Maradona in a squad of 14 local players in late May of that year, and made his debut on the 20th – aged just 18 – in a friendly with Panama (3–1 win in Santa Fe).

== Personal life ==
Zuculini's younger brother, Bruno, is also a footballer and a midfielder. He too represented Racing de Avellaneda.
