= Javier Paredes =

Spanish former footballer (born 1982)

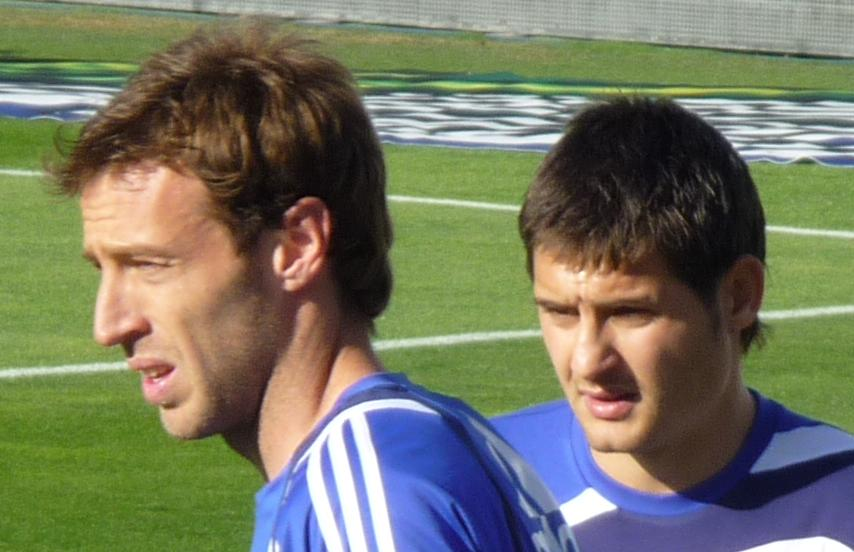
- Paredes (right) in 2009

Personal information
- Full name: Javier Paredes Arango
- Date of birth: 5 July 1982 (age 44)
- Place of birth: Oviedo, Spain
- Height: 1.75 m (5 ft 9 in)
- Position: Left-back

Youth career
- Oviedo

Senior career*
Years	Team	Apps	(Gls)
2000–2002	Oviedo B	26	(0)
2001–2003	Oviedo	40	(1)
2003–2005	Real Madrid B	67	(1)
2004	Real Madrid	0	(0)
2005–2007	Getafe	40	(0)
2007–2014	Zaragoza	157	(0)
2015–2016	Albacete	58	(3)
2017–2018	Ebro	16	(1)
Total		404	(6)

International career
2000–2001	Spain U18	11	(0)
- * Club domestic league appearances and goals

Javier Paredes Arango (born 5 July 1982) is a Spanish former professional footballer who played mainly as a left-back.

He started at Real Oviedo, and made his La Liga debut with Getafe in 2005. He represented mainly Zaragoza in an 18-year senior career, signing in 2007 and appearing in 172 competitive games.

== Club career ==
=== Early career and Getafe ===
Paredes was born in Oviedo, Asturias. After starting out at his hometown club Real Oviedo and being relegated from Segunda División in the 2002–03 season, he left for two additional campaigns with Real Madrid's reserves, who competed in the Segunda División B; he made two appearances in the Copa del Rey with the latter's first team.

In 2005–06, Paredes joined Getafe CF also in the Madrid area, and made his official – and La Liga – debut on 28 August 2005, in a 2–0 away win against Real Sociedad. He appeared in only seven games that season, barred by Mariano Pernía, but would be the undisputed starter in the following after the Argentine left for Atlético Madrid.

=== Zaragoza ===
Paredes signed with Aragon's Real Zaragoza for 2007–08, agreeing to a five-year contract. Initially backing up Juanfran, he finished as first-choice as the team eventually got relegated; he started again the following campaign, helping to an immediate promotion.

Pushed by newly arrived Ivan Obradović, Paredes played just 20 league matches in 2009–10, but was still the most utilised left-back to help his side to retain their top-division status. In the summer, he was deemed surplus to requirements by manager José Aurelio Gay, being limited to training. In early September 2010, both got involved in a serious argument in training that nearly evolved to a physical confrontation; subsequently, the player was suspended, being reinstated – and inserted in the starting XI – in November, as Gay was dismissed and replaced by Javier Aguirre.

In the following years, Paredes featured more often than not as a central defender. Zaragoza returned to the second tier at the end of the 2012–13 season, and he was released on 25 February 2014 alongside José María Movilla, finding about the news through the club's website.

=== Albacete ===
In January 2015, Paredes moved to second-division Albacete Balompié following a successful trial. He scored his first goal on 1 November, closing the 1–1 draw away to Deportivo Alavés.

Paredes worked as a lawyer after retiring.
