= Maurizio Lanzaro =

Italian footballer

Personal information
- Date of birth: 14 March 1982 (age 44)
- Place of birth: Avellino, Italy
- Height: 1.83 m (6 ft 0 in)
- Position: Centre back

Youth career
- Avellino
- Roma

Senior career*
Years	Team	Apps	(Gls)
1998–2005	Roma	1	(0)
2001	→ Verona (loan)	3	(0)
2001–2002	→ Palermo (loan)	14	(0)
2002–2003	→ Cosenza (loan)	27	(0)
2003–2004	→ Empoli (loan)	8	(0)
2004–2005	→ Salernitana (loan)	34	(1)
2005–2010	Reggina	146	(2)
2010–2013	Zaragoza	43	(2)
2013–2014	Juve Stabia	23	(3)
2014–2016	Salernitana	51	(1)
2016	Foggia	5	(0)
2016–2017	Melfi	1	(0)
2017–2018	Ejea		

International career
1998–1999	Italy U16	16	(1)
1999–2001	Italy U18	13	(0)
2000	Italy U20	4	(0)
2002–2003	Italy U21	4	(0)

Managerial career
- 2022: Seregno (caretaker)
- * Club domestic league appearances and goals

Maurizio Lanzaro (born 14 March 1982) is an Italian football coach and former player.

== Playing career ==
A central defender, he made his professional debut with AS Roma on a Serie A league game against Piacenza on 9 May 1999. He successively moved to Verona in the Italian top flight, and then went on to Serie B teams Palermo and Cosenza.

He returned in the Italian top flight with Empoli in 2003, and successively with Reggina. In 2010 he then moved to Spain to join then-La Liga club Real Zaragoza. He retired in 2018.

== Coaching career ==
On 28 March 2022, he was named new caretaker of Serie C club Seregno, a club he had joined as a coaching staff member earlier in the summer of 2021, after head coach Alberto Mariani was forced to temporarily relinquish his position for personal reasons.
