= Borja Ekiza =

Spanish footballer (born 1988)

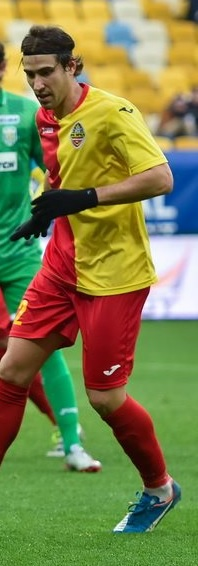
- Ekiza in 2016

Personal information
- Full name: Borja Ekiza Imaz
- Date of birth: 6 March 1988 (age 38)
- Place of birth: Pamplona, Spain
- Height: 1.80 m (5 ft 11 in)
- Position: Centre-back

Youth career
- 2001–2002: Txantrea
- 2002–2006: Athletic Bilbao

Senior career*
Years	Team	Apps	(Gls)
2006–2008	Basconia	41	(0)
2008–2011	Bilbao Athletic	36	(1)
2011–2014	Athletic Bilbao	67	(0)
2014–2016	Eibar	15	(0)
2016–2017	Zirka Kropyvnytskyi	10	(1)
2017–2018	Omonia	6	(1)
2018–2019	Enosis Neon Paralimni	1	(0)
2021–2022	Txantrea	14	(0)
Total		190	(3)

International career
2011–2013	Basque Country	2	(0)
- * Club domestic league appearances and goals

Borja Ekiza Imaz (born 6 March 1988) is a Spanish former professional footballer who played as a centre-back.

== Club career ==
=== Athletic Bilbao ===
Born in Pamplona, Ekiza arrived at Athletic Bilbao's youth system at the age of 14, being eligible to represent the Basque through his Navarrese roots. He spent his first two senior seasons with Basconia, the club's third team.

Subsequently, Ekiza played with the reserves in the Segunda División B, being sparingly used over two years. On 8 January 2011, after a string of injuries to the defensive sector in the first team awarded him with promotion to the main squad, he made his La Liga debut in a 1–1 away draw against Málaga, playing the full 90 minutes; he finished his first top-flight campaign established in the starting XI, beating competition from seasoned veterans Fernando Amorebieta, Aitor Ocio and Ustaritz and being booked only once.

Ekiza lost his starting spot to Aymeric Laporte and Carlos Gurpegui in 2013–14 due to repeated injuries, and only appeared once in the league during the season, 37 minutes in a 2–1 win at Real Valladolid. On 31 July 2014, he terminated his contract with the Lions and signed a two-year deal with fellow top-tier side Eibar hours later.

=== Later years ===
On 21 July 2017, Cypriot First Division club Omonia announced the signing of Ekiza from Ukraine's Zirka Kropyvnytskyi. Two years later, following a spell in the same country and league with Enosis Neon Paralimni, the 31-year-old announced his retirement from football.

In the summer of 2021, after two years of inactivity, Ekiza joined local amateurs UDC Txantrea alongside his former Athletic teammate (youth and senior) Adrien Goñi.

== Career statistics ==
Appearances and goals by club, season and competition
Club	Season	League		Cup		Europe		Total	
Club	Season	Apps	Goals	Apps	Goals	Apps	Goals	Apps	Goals
Basconia	2006–07	18	0	–		–		18	0
Basconia	2007–08	23	0	–		–		23	0
Basconia	Total	41	0	–		–		41	0
Bilbao Athletic	2008–09	14	1	–		–		14	1
Bilbao Athletic	2009–10	8	0	–		–		8	0
Bilbao Athletic	2010–11	14	0	–		–		14	0
Bilbao Athletic	Total	36	1	–		–		36	1
Athletic Bilbao	2010–11	21	0	0	0	–		21	0
Athletic Bilbao	2011–12	21	0	2	0	8	0	31	0
Athletic Bilbao	2012–13	24	0	1	0	3	0	28	0
Athletic Bilbao	2013–14	1	0	1	0	–		2	0
Athletic Bilbao	Total	67	0	4	0	11	0	82	0
Eibar	2014–15	11	0	2	0	–		13	0
Eibar	2015–16	4	0	3	1	–		7	1
Eibar	Total	15	0	5	1	–		20	1
Zirka Kropyvnytskyi	2016–17	10	1	1	0	–		11	1
Omonia	2017–18	6	1	0	0	–		6	1
Enosis Neon Paralimni	2018–19	1	0	0	0	–		1	0
Career total		176	3	10	1	11	0	197	4

== Honours ==
Athletic Bilbao

- Copa del Rey runner-up: 2011–12
- UEFA Europa League runner-up: 2011–12
