= Apoño =

Spanish footballer (born 1984)

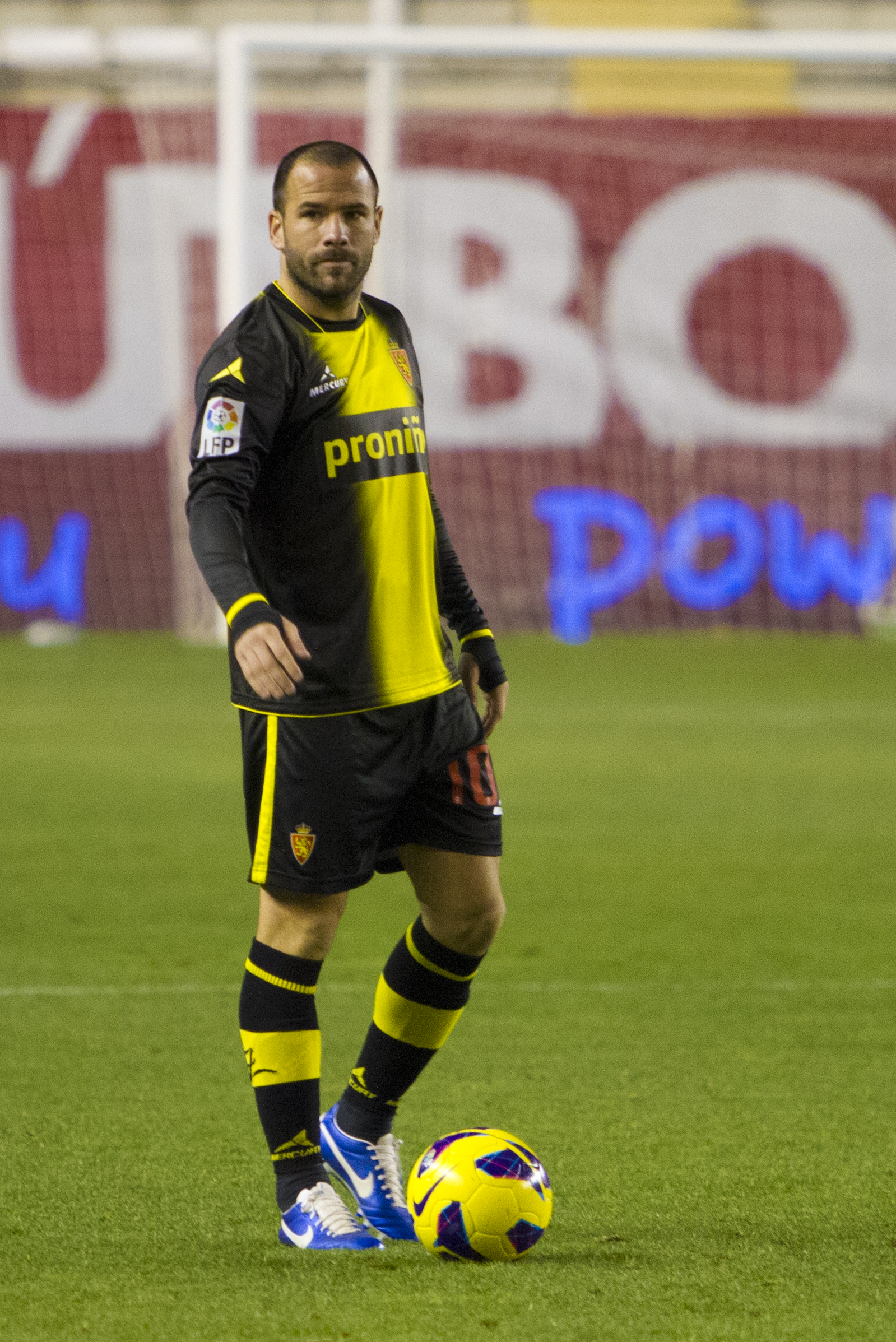
- Apoño with Zaragoza in 2012

Personal information
- Full name: Antonio Galdeano Benítez
- Date of birth: 13 February 1984 (age 42)
- Place of birth: Málaga, Spain
- Height: 1.73 m (5 ft 8 in)
- Position: Midfielder

Youth career
- 26 de Febrero
- 2000–2003: Málaga

Senior career*
Years	Team	Apps	(Gls)
2003–2004	San Pedro		
2004–2007	Marbella	84	(13)
2007–2012	Málaga	120	(15)
2012	→ Zaragoza (loan)	17	(5)
2012–2013	Zaragoza	32	(9)
2013–2014	Las Palmas	29	(1)
2014–2015	OFI	3	(0)
2015	El Palo	9	(0)
2016	Marbella	7	(0)
2017–2018	El Palo	24	(8)
Total		325	(51)
- * Club domestic league appearances and goals

Antonio Galdeano Benítez (born 13 February 1984), known as Apoño, is a Spanish retired footballer who played as a central midfielder. A player with both hard-working and playmaking skills, he was also a penalty kick specialist.

He amassed La Liga totals of 138 matches and 28 goals over five seasons, representing in the competition Málaga and Zaragoza. He also competed professionally in Greece.

== Club career ==
=== Early career ===
Born in Málaga, Apoño began his career with local UD San Pedro and, for the 2004–05 season, moved to Andalusia neighbours UD Marbella in Segunda División B, where he would remain three years.

=== Málaga ===
In July 2007, Apoño joined Segunda División side Málaga CF – after having emerged through their youth system– also in his native region, being an instrumental figure in their return to La Liga after a two-year absence. He was brought in as the club was coached by Juan Ramón López Muñiz, who had briefly managed the player at Marbella.

In the following campaign, Apoño remained a starter: he made his top division debut on 31 August 2008, in a 0–4 away loss against Atlético Madrid, and finished the campaign with nine league goals – best in the squad with striker Nabil Baha – seven from penalty kicks, notably in a 3–4 loss at the Santiago Bernabéu Stadium against Real Madrid.

On 30 July 2010, after a season with many injury problems, with Málaga only ranking in 17th position, Apoño signed a contract extension running until June 2014. He made his 100th official appearance for the club alongside teammate Weligton, in a 1–4 home defeat against Real Madrid on 16 October 2010, and finished 2010–11 with 27 league appearances (26 starts) and one goal.

After the first match in the following campaign, a 1–2 away loss to Sevilla FC in which he was replaced at half-time – with the score at 2–0 for the hosts – reacting angrily, Apoño was suspended by coach Manuel Pellegrini. He returned to action nearly two months after, playing the full 90 minutes in a 0–4 home defeat against Real Madrid; on 9 January 2012 the Chilean told the player to start looking for a new club, as their altercation had continued for too long.

=== Zaragoza ===
On 19 January 2012, Apoño was loaned out to fellow league side Real Zaragoza for the rest of the season. He made his debut for his new team three days later, starting in a 0–0 draw at Levante UD.

Apoño scored his first goal(s) for the Aragonese on 21 March, netting a brace (one penalty) for bottom-placed Zaragoza in a 2–1 away win against Valencia CF. The following round, again from the 11-meter spot, he scored in the 95th minute for the game's only goal in a home success over Atlético Madrid, and featured heavily as the club again retained its division status in the last round.

=== Later years ===
On 5 September 2013, free agent Apoño joined second level's UD Las Palmas on a one-year deal. He netted twice during his spell in the Canary Islands, including once in the promotion play-offs at home to Córdoba CF (1–1 home draw, away goals rule elimination).

Subsequently, after an unassuming spell in the Super League Greece with OFI, 31-year-old Apoño returned to Spain and went on to represent CD El Palo and Marbella again. On 6 May 2015, representing the former against the latter, he was handed a 12-match ban after being sent off during a third tier match held five days earlier, having allegedly insulted the refereeing team as well as making death threats.

== Personal life ==
Apoño's younger brother, Juan, was also a footballer and a midfielder. He also appeared for Málaga, but only for the B-team. The siblings shared teams at El Palo. He now has a son by the name of Hugo Galdeano who plays for FC Barcelona's U-12 Academy Team.
