= List of Burgos CF managers =

The following is a list of Burgos CF managers from the beginning of the club's official managerial records in 1994 to the present day.

Since 1994, Burgos had, with the current one, 18 managers in all its history. The first coach was Félix Arnaiz.

Arnaiz is also the club's longest-serving manager having four spells managing the club from 1994 to 2008, totalling 160 league matches, followed by Carlos Terrazas with 109 and Javier Álvarez de los Mozos with 81. De los Mozos is also the manager who coached more games consecutively.

== List of managers ==
Only league games are counted, not including playoffs.

Name	From	To	Pld	W	D	L	GF	GA	PCT
Félix Arnaiz	1994	1996	68	58	5	5	238	36	.853
José Luis Martínez Lobato	1996	1997	36	28	4	4	81	23	.778
Blas Ziarreta	1997	1998	33	9	11	13	21	29	.273
Félix Arnaiz (2)	1998	1998	5	2	1	2	10	8	.400
Vicente González-Villamil	1998	1998	9	1	5	3	5	7	.111
Félix Arnaiz (3)	1998	2000	67	36	20	11	97	43	.537
Carlos Terrazas	2000	2001	38	20	12	6	53	20	.526
Enrique Martín	2001	2002	42	12	16	14	31	37	.286
Carlos Terrazas (2)	2002	2004	71	30	27	14	83	57	.423
Javier Álvarez de los Mozos	2004	2004	5	2	1	2	5	4	.400
Fede Castaños	2004	2005	38	17	12	9	44	24	.447
Fabri González	2005	2006	38	17	13	8	48	38	.447
Gonzalo Arconada	2006	2007	38	20	9	9	51	24	.526
Félix Arnaiz (4)	2007	2008	20	6	6	8	18	21	.300
Alberto González	2008	2008	10	2	3	5	5	9	.200
Raúl González	2008	2008	8	1	4	3	7	9	.125
Javier Álvarez de los Mozos (2)	2008	2010	76	52	18	6	137	41	.684
Carlos Tornadijo	2010	2011	38	25	9	4	75	23	.951
Julio Bañuelos	2011	2011	7	1	0	6	5	12	.143
Miguel Ángel Álvarez Tomé	2011	2011	31	6	7	18	24	51	.194
Ramón Calderé	2012	2014	74	41	13	20	118	63	.554
Fede Castaños (2)	2014	2015	38	13	10	15	37	40	.342
Ángel Viadero	2015	2016	38	15	13	10	47	39	.395
Paco Fernández	2016	2016	6	0	1	5	5	11	.000
Manix Mandiola	2016	2017	29	10	8	11	32	36	.345
Nacho Fernández	2017	2017	3	2	0	1	6	7	.667
Patxi Salinas	2017	2018	24	9	10	5	18	13	.375
Nacho Fernández (2)	2018	2018	2	0	1	1	0	1	.000
Alejandro Menéndez	2018	2018	12	3	4	5	10	14	.250
Alejandro Menéndez	2018	2018	12	3	4	5	10	14	.250
José Manuel Mateo	2018	2018	9	2	2	5	4	9	.222
Fernando Estévez	2018	2019	29	10	10	9	24	23	.345
