= 2016–17 Segunda División =

86th season of the second-tier football league in Spain

Segunda División
- Season: 2016–17
- Champions: Levante
- Promoted: Levante; Girona; Getafe
- Relegated: UCAM Murcia; Mallorca; Elche; Mirandés
- Matches: 462
- Goals: 1,041 (2.25 per match)
- Top goalscorer: Joselu (23 goals)
- Biggest home win: Valladolid 5–0 Mirandés (11 December 2016)
- Biggest away win: Valladolid 0–4 Levante (11 March 2017)
- Highest scoring: Elche 4–4 Gimnàstic (8 October 2016); Sevilla Atlético 5–3 Oviedo (8 January 2017); Sevilla Atlético 6–2 Valladolid (16 April 2017)
- Longest winning run: Levante (16, 18–22) (6 matches)
- Longest unbeaten run: Tenerife (19–29) (11 matches)
- Longest winless run: Gimnàstic (1–12) (12 matches)
- Longest losing run: Valladolid (4–8); Mirandés (10–14) (5 matches)
- Highest attendance: 22,034; Cádiz 2–1 Mirandés (4 February 2017)
- Lowest attendance: 1,532; Alcorcón 0–0 Huesca (21 August 2016)
- Average attendance: 7,607

The 2016–17 Segunda División season, also known as LaLiga 1|2|3 for sponsorship reasons, was the 86th since its establishment. The fixtures were announced on 15 July 2016.

== Name ==
Previously named Liga Adelante, the competition was renamed LaLiga 1|2|3 (LaLiga Uno Dos Tres) ahead of the 2016–17 season, as a result of a three-year sponsorship agreement between the Liga de Fútbol Profesional and the banking group Banco Santander.

== Team changes ==
=== To Segunda División ===
Promoted from Segunda División B

- Cádiz
- Reus
- UCAM Murcia
- Sevilla Atlético

Relegated from LaLiga

- Rayo Vallecano
- Getafe
- Levante

=== From Segunda División ===
Relegated to 2016–17 Segunda División B

- Ponferradina
- Llagostera
- Albacete
- Bilbao Athletic

Promoted to 2016–17 La Liga

- Alavés
- Leganés
- Osasuna

== Stadia and locations ==
Location of teams in 2016–17 Segunda División
Location of teams in 2016–17 Segunda División (Canary Islands)

| Team | Location | Stadium | Capacity |
|---|---|---|---|
| Alcorcón | Alcorcón | Santo Domingo | 5,100 |
| Almería | Almería | Juegos Mediterráneos | 15,000 |
| Cádiz | Cádiz | Ramón de Carranza | 25,033 |
| Córdoba | Córdoba | El Arcángel | 20,989 |
| Elche | Elche | Martínez Valero | 33,732 |
| Getafe | Getafe | Coliseum Alfonso Pérez | 17,000 |
| Gimnàstic | Tarragona | Nou Estadi | 14,591 |
| Girona | Girona | Montilivi | 9,200 |
| Huesca | Huesca | El Alcoraz | 5,500 |
| Levante | Valencia | Ciutat de València | 25,354 |
| Lugo | Lugo | Anxo Carro | 7,840 |
| Mallorca | Palma | Iberostar | 23,142 |
| Mirandés | Miranda de Ebro | Anduva | 6,900 |
| Numancia | Soria | Los Pajaritos | 9,039 |
| Oviedo | Oviedo | Carlos Tartiere | 30,500 |
| Rayo Vallecano | Madrid | Vallecas | 14,708 |
| Reus | Reus | Municipal | 4,700 |
| Sevilla Atlético | Seville | Ramón Sánchez Pizjuán | 42,714 |
| Tenerife | Santa Cruz de Tenerife | Heliodoro Rodríguez López | 22,824 |
| UCAM Murcia | Murcia | La Condomina | 6,500 |
| Valladolid | Valladolid | José Zorrilla | 26,512 |
| Zaragoza | Zaragoza | La Romareda | 34,596 |

=== Personnel and sponsorship ===
| Team | Chairman | Head coach | Captain | Kit manufacturer | Main shirt sponsor |
|---|---|---|---|---|---|
| Alcorcón | Ignacio Legido | (Spain) Julio Velázquez | (Spain) Óscar Plano | Erreà | ARC |
| Almería | Alfonso García Gabarrón | (Spain) Luis Miguel Ramis | (Spain) Corona | Nike | Urcisol |
| Cádiz | Manuel Vizcaíno | (Spain) Álvaro Cervera | (Spain) Sergio Mantecón | Adidas | Socibus |
| Córdoba | Carlos González | (Spain) Luis Carrión | (Spain) Luso | Kappa | Tango Fruit |
| Elche | Junta Gestora | (Spain) Vicente Parras | (Spain) Lolo | Kelme | TM Grupo Inmobiliario |
| Getafe | Ángel Torres | (Spain) José Bordalás | (Algeria) Mehdi Lacen | Joma | Tecnocasa Group |
| Gimnàstic | Josep María Andreu | (Spain) Nano Rivas | (Spain) Manolo Reina | Hummel | Sorigué |
| Girona | Delfí Geli | (Spain) Pablo Machín | (Spain) Richy | Kappa | City Lift |
| Huesca | Fernando Losfablos | (Spain) Juan Antonio Anquela | (Spain) Juanjo Camacho | Bemiser | Simply Supermercados |
| Levante | Quico Catalán | (Spain) Juan Ramón López Muñiz | (Spain) Pedro López | Macron | East United |
| Lugo | Tino Saqués | (Spain) Luis César Sampedro | (Spain) Manu | Hummel | Estrella Galicia |
| Mallorca | Robert Sarver | (Spain) Sergi Barjuán | (Spain) Héctor Yuste | Umbro | Air Europa |
| Mirandés | Alfredo de Miguel | (Spain) Pablo Alfaro | (Spain) Rúper | Adidas | Miranda Empresas |
| Numancia | Francisco Rubio | (Spain) Jagoba Arrasate | (Venezuela) Julio Álvarez | Erreà | Soria Natural |
| Oviedo | Jorge Menéndez | (Spain) Fernando Hierro | (Spain) Jon Erice | Adidas | Procoin |
| Rayo Vallecano | Martín Presa | (Spain) Míchel | (Spain) Roberto Trashorras | Kelme | |
| Reus | Xavier Llastarri | (Spain) Natxo González | (Spain) Ramón Folch | Kappa | Borges |
| Sevilla Atlético | José Castro | (Spain) Diego Martínez | (Spain) Antonio Cotán | New Balance | |
| Tenerife | Miguel Concepción | (Spain) José Luis Martí | (Spain) Suso Santana | Hummel | Santa Cruz |
| UCAM Murcia | José Luis Mendoza | (Spain) Francisco Rodríguez | (Spain) Juan Góngora | Nike | UCAM |
| Valladolid | Carlos Suárez | (Spain) Paco Herrera | (Spain) Javi Moyano | Hummel | Cuatro Rayas |
| Zaragoza | Christian Lapetra | (Spain) César Láinez | (Spain) Alberto Zapater | Adidas | Caravan Fragancias |

=== Managerial changes ===
| Team | Outgoing manager | Manner of departure | Date of vacancy | Position in table | Replaced by | Date of appointment |
|---|---|---|---|---|---|---|
| Levante | (Spain) Rubi | Sacked | 26 May 2016 | Pre-season | (Spain) Juan Ramón Muñiz | 14 June 2016 |
| Valladolid | (Spain) Alberto López | Mutual consent | 4 June 2016 | Pre-season | (Spain) Paco Herrera | 7 June 2016 |
| Zaragoza | (Spain) Lluís Carreras | Sacked | 6 June 2016 | Pre-season | (Spain) Luis Milla | 15 June 2016 |
| Elche | (Spain) Rubén Baraja | Resigned | 6 June 2016 | Pre-season | (Spain) Lucas Alcaraz | 11 June 2016 |
| Oviedo | (Spain) David Generelo | Sacked | 4 June 2016 | Pre-season | (Spain) Fernando Hierro | 8 June 2016 |
| Alcorcón | (Spain) Juan Ramón Muñiz | Signed for Levante | 14 June 2016 | Pre-season | (Romania) Cosmin Contra | 15 June 2016 |
| Lugo | (Spain) José Antonio Durán | End of tenure as caretaker | 10 June 2016 | Pre-season | (Spain) Luis César Sampedro | 15 June 2016 |
| Elche | (Spain) Lucas Alcaraz | Resigned | 17 June 2016 | Pre-season | (Spain) Alberto Toril | 28 June 2016 |
| Rayo Vallecano | (Spain) Paco Jémez | Signed for Granada | 20 June 2016 | Pre-season | (Spain) José Ramón Sandoval | 27 June 2016 |
| Getafe | (Argentina) Juan Esnáider | Sacked | 26 September 2016 | 21st | (Spain) José Bordalás | 27 September 2016 |
| Alcorcón | (Romania) Cosmin Contra | Sacked | 12 October 2016 | 20th | (Spain) Julio Velázquez | 13 October 2016 |
| Zaragoza | (Spain) Luis Milla | Sacked | 23 October 2016 | 15th | (Spain) Raül Agné | 25 October 2016 |
| Rayo Vallecano | (Spain) José Ramón Sandoval | Sacked | 6 November 2016 | 16th | (Spain) Rubén Baraja | 8 November 2016 |
| Córdoba | (Spain) José Luis Oltra | Sacked | 27 November 2016 | 16th | (Spain) Luis Carrión | 30 November 2016 |
| Mirandés | (Spain) Carlos Terrazas | Sacked | 1 December 2016 | 21st | (Spain) Javier de los Mozos (caretaker) | 2 December 2016 |
| Mallorca | (Spain) Fernando Vázquez | Sacked | 6 December 2016 | 17th | (Spain) Javier Olaizola | 6 December 2016 |
| Mirandés | (Spain) Javier de los Mozos | End of tenure as caretaker | 7 December 2016 | 18th | (Spain) Claudio Barragán | 7 December 2016 |
| UCAM Murcia | (Spain) José María Salmerón | Sacked | 11 December 2016 | 21st | (Spain) Francisco Rodríguez | 13 December 2016 |
| Gimnàstic | (Spain) Vicente Moreno | Resigned | 27 December 2016 | 22nd | (Spain) Juan Merino | 28 December 2016 |
| Mirandés | (Spain) Claudio Barragán | Sacked | 17 January 2017 | 19th | (Spain) Javier de los Mozos | 18 January 2017 |
| Rayo Vallecano | (Spain) Rubén Baraja | Sacked | 20 February 2017 | 16th | (Spain) Míchel | 21 February 2017 |
| Almería | (Spain) Fernando Soriano | Sacked | 26 February 2017 | 22nd | (Spain) Fran Fernández (caretaker) | 1 March 2017 |
| Almería | (Spain) Fran Fernández | End of tenure as caretaker | 14 March 2017 | 20th | (Spain) Luis Miguel Ramis | 14 March 2017 |
| Zaragoza | (Spain) Raül Agné | Sacked | 19 March 2017 | 15th | (Spain) César Láinez | 19 March 2017 |
| Mirandés | (Spain) Javier de los Mozos | Sacked | 28 March 2017 | 22nd | (Spain) Pablo Alfaro | 28 March 2017 |
| Mallorca | (Spain) Javier Olaizola | Mutual consent | 4 April 2017 | 21st | (Spain) Sergi Barjuán | 4 April 2017 |
| Elche | (Spain) Alberto Toril | Sacked | 29 April 2017 | 16th | (Spain) Vicente Parras | 29 April 2017 |
| Gimnàstic | (Spain) Juan Merino | Sacked | 20 May 2017 | 19th | (Spain) Nano Rivas | 20 May 2017 |

== League table ==
=== Standings ===
| Pos | Team | Pld | W | D | L | GF | GA | GD | Pts | Promotion, qualification or relegation |
|---|---|---|---|---|---|---|---|---|---|---|
| 1 | Levante (C, P) | 42 | 25 | 9 | 8 | 57 | 32 | +25 | 84 | Promotion to La Liga |
| 2 | Girona (P) | 42 | 20 | 10 | 12 | 65 | 45 | +20 | 70 | Promotion to La Liga |
| 3 | Getafe (O, P) | 42 | 18 | 14 | 10 | 55 | 43 | +12 | 68 | Qualification to promotion play-offs |
| 4 | Tenerife | 42 | 16 | 18 | 8 | 50 | 37 | +13 | 66 | Qualification to promotion play-offs |
| 5 | Cádiz | 42 | 16 | 16 | 10 | 55 | 40 | +15 | 64 | Qualification to promotion play-offs |
| 6 | Huesca | 42 | 16 | 15 | 11 | 53 | 43 | +10 | 63 (Note: Huesca finished ahead of Valladolid on head-to-head points: Valladolid 1–2 Huesca, Huesca 1–0 Valladolid) | Qualification to promotion play-offs |
| 7 | Valladolid | 42 | 18 | 9 | 15 | 52 | 47 | +5 | 63 | |
| 8 | Oviedo | 42 | 17 | 10 | 15 | 47 | 47 | 0 | 61 | |
| 9 | Lugo | 42 | 14 | 13 | 15 | 49 | 52 | −3 | 55 (Note: Lugo and Córdoba finished ahead of Reus on head-to-head points: Lugo 7 pts, Córdoba 7 pts, Reus 3 pts. Lugo finished ahead of Córdoba on head-to-head points: Córdoba 3–3 Lugo, Lugo 1–0 Córdoba) | |
| 10 | Córdoba | 42 | 14 | 13 | 15 | 42 | 52 | −10 | 55 | |
| 11 | Reus | 42 | 13 | 16 | 13 | 31 | 29 | +2 | 55 | |
| 12 | Rayo Vallecano | 42 | 14 | 11 | 17 | 44 | 44 | 0 | 53 (Note: Rayo Vallecano finished ahead of Sevilla Atlético on head-to-head points: Rayo Vallecano 1–1 Sevilla Atlético, Sevilla Atlético 1–2 Rayo Vallecano) | |
| 13 | Sevilla Atlético | 42 | 13 | 14 | 15 | 55 | 56 | −1 | 53 | Ineligible for promotion and the Copa del Rey |
| 14 | Gimnàstic | 42 | 12 | 16 | 14 | 47 | 51 | −4 | 52 | |
| 15 | Almería | 42 | 14 | 9 | 19 | 44 | 49 | −5 | 51 | |
| 16 | Zaragoza | 42 | 12 | 14 | 16 | 50 | 52 | −2 | 50 (Note: Zaragoza and Numancia finished ahead of Alcorcón on head-to-head points: Zaragoza 7 pts, Numancia 7 pts, Alcorcón 2 pts. Zaragoza finished ahead of Numancia on head-to-head goal difference: Numancia 2–1 Zaragoza, Zaragoza 3–0 Numancia) | |
| 17 | Numancia | 42 | 11 | 17 | 14 | 40 | 49 | −9 | 50 | |
| 18 | Alcorcón | 42 | 13 | 11 | 18 | 32 | 43 | −11 | 50 | |
| 19 | UCAM Murcia (R) | 42 | 11 | 15 | 16 | 42 | 51 | −9 | 48 | Relegation to Segunda División B |
| 20 | Mallorca (R) | 42 | 9 | 18 | 15 | 42 | 50 | −8 | 45 | Relegation to Segunda División B |
| 21 | Elche (R) | 42 | 11 | 10 | 21 | 49 | 63 | −14 | 43 | Relegation to Segunda División B |
| 22 | Mirandés (R) | 42 | 9 | 14 | 19 | 40 | 66 | −26 | 41 | Relegation to Segunda División B |

Source: La Liga
Rules for classification: 1) points; 2) head-to-head points; 3) head-to-head goal difference; 4) goal difference; 5) number of goals scored
(C) Champions; (O) Play-off winners; (P) Promoted; (R) Relegated

=== Positions by round ===
| Team ╲ Round | 1 | 2 | 3 | 4 | 5 | 6 | 7 | 8 | 9 | 10 | 11 | 12 | 13 | 14 | 15 | 16 | 17 | 18 | 19 | 20 | 21 | 22 | 23 | 24 | 25 | 26 | 27 | 28 | 29 | 30 | 31 | 32 | 33 | 34 | 35 | 36 | 37 | 38 | 39 | 40 | 41 | 42 |
|---|---|---|---|---|---|---|---|---|---|---|---|---|---|---|---|---|---|---|---|---|---|---|---|---|---|---|---|---|---|---|---|---|---|---|---|---|---|---|---|---|---|---|
| Levante | 4 | 1 | 2 | 1 | 1 | 1 | 1 | 1 | 1 | 1 | 1 | 1 | 1 | 1 | 1 | 1 | 1 | 1 | 1 | 1 | 1 | 1 | 1 | 1 | 1 | 1 | 1 | 1 | 1 | 1 | 1 | 1 | 1 | 1 | 1 | 1 | 1 | 1 | 1 | 1 | 1 | 1 |
| Girona | 7 | 2 | 8 | 10 | 15 | 13 | 9 | 6 | 6 | 6 | 11 | 7 | 5 | 3 | 2 | 2 | 2 | 2 | 2 | 2 | 2 | 2 | 2 | 2 | 2 | 2 | 2 | 2 | 2 | 2 | 2 | 2 | 2 | 2 | 2 | 2 | 2 | 2 | 2 | 2 | 2 | 2 |
| Getafe | 13 | 14 | 14 | 21 | 13 | 17 | 21 | 20 | 18 | 12 | 13 | 13 | 10 | 14 | 9 | 5 | 4 | 3 | 3 | 3 | 3 | 4 | 4 | 5 | 4 | 6 | 5 | 6 | 6 | 6 | 6 | 6 | 6 | 4 | 4 | 3 | 3 | 3 | 3 | 3 | 3 | 3 |
| Tenerife | 21 | 18 | 21 | 15 | 8 | 10 | 15 | 14 | 17 | 17 | 20 | 17 | 17 | 15 | 13 | 9 | 10 | 13 | 11 | 9 | 8 | 5 | 6 | 4 | 5 | 4 | 4 | 3 | 4 | 4 | 4 | 3 | 3 | 3 | 3 | 6 | 4 | 4 | 4 | 4 | 5 | 4 |
| Cádiz | 12 | 12 | 15 | 8 | 14 | 9 | 12 | 17 | 19 | 19 | 19 | 16 | 12 | 12 | 8 | 12 | 6 | 4 | 4 | 4 | 4 | 3 | 3 | 3 | 3 | 3 | 3 | 5 | 3 | 3 | 3 | 4 | 5 | 5 | 5 | 4 | 5 | 5 | 5 | 5 | 4 | 5 |
| Huesca | 16 | 15 | 16 | 9 | 17 | 19 | 13 | 10 | 14 | 9 | 9 | 5 | 8 | 5 | 6 | 7 | 9 | 8 | 6 | 6 | 11 | 11 | 14 | 15 | 12 | 10 | 9 | 7 | 7 | 7 | 7 | 7 | 7 | 7 | 7 | 5 | 6 | 6 | 7 | 7 | 6 | 6 |
| Valladolid | 6 | 6 | 3 | 4 | 7 | 11 | 18 | 18 | 16 | 11 | 12 | 10 | 7 | 11 | 15 | 14 | 11 | 10 | 13 | 7 | 5 | 7 | 5 | 8 | 9 | 7 | 7 | 8 | 8 | 8 | 8 | 9 | 8 | 10 | 8 | 8 | 7 | 7 | 6 | 6 | 7 | 7 |
| Oviedo | 20 | 7 | 10 | 12 | 18 | 18 | 11 | 13 | 7 | 10 | 6 | 4 | 2 | 7 | 4 | 6 | 5 | 9 | 12 | 13 | 10 | 6 | 10 | 7 | 6 | 5 | 6 | 4 | 5 | 5 | 5 | 5 | 4 | 6 | 6 | 7 | 8 | 8 | 8 | 8 | 8 | 8 |
| Lugo | 10 | 9 | 11 | 5 | 3 | 2 | 3 | 2 | 2 | 2 | 3 | 8 | 6 | 4 | 7 | 10 | 7 | 5 | 5 | 8 | 6 | 8 | 7 | 6 | 7 | 8 | 8 | 9 | 9 | 9 | 10 | 8 | 9 | 8 | 9 | 9 | 11 | 10 | 9 | 11 | 10 | 9 |
| Córdoba | 3 | 4 | 5 | 14 | 6 | 5 | 2 | 3 | 3 | 4 | 5 | 6 | 9 | 13 | 14 | 16 | 13 | 16 | 14 | 14 | 15 | 16 | 16 | 18 | 19 | 19 | 17 | 18 | 18 | 16 | 17 | 16 | 18 | 17 | 18 | 17 | 17 | 16 | 16 | 13 | 12 | 10 |
| Reus | 5 | 5 | 7 | 7 | 5 | 3 | 5 | 5 | 5 | 3 | 2 | 3 | 4 | 8 | 5 | 4 | 8 | 6 | 7 | 10 | 9 | 9 | 8 | 10 | 10 | 12 | 12 | 11 | 11 | 10 | 11 | 12 | 13 | 14 | 14 | 13 | 10 | 12 | 11 | 10 | 9 | 11 |
| Rayo | 17 | 17 | 22 | 16 | 21 | 12 | 14 | 9 | 13 | 15 | 8 | 12 | 16 | 18 | 18 | 20 | 16 | 14 | 16 | 16 | 16 | 17 | 17 | 16 | 16 | 16 | 19 | 19 | 21 | 19 | 18 | 17 | 16 | 15 | 13 | 15 | 13 | 14 | 12 | 12 | 15 | 12 |
| Sevilla At. | 8 | 10 | 12 | 17 | 10 | 14 | 16 | 16 | 9 | 7 | 4 | 2 | 3 | 2 | 3 | 3 | 3 | 7 | 9 | 5 | 7 | 10 | 9 | 11 | 11 | 13 | 13 | 14 | 13 | 12 | 9 | 10 | 10 | 9 | 10 | 10 | 9 | 9 | 10 | 9 | 11 | 13 |
| Gimnàstic | 9 | 11 | 13 | 18 | 22 | 22 | 22 | 22 | 22 | 22 | 22 | 22 | 22 | 22 | 22 | 22 | 22 | 22 | 22 | 22 | 22 | 22 | 22 | 22 | 22 | 21 | 18 | 15 | 15 | 18 | 16 | 18 | 17 | 16 | 16 | 19 | 19 | 19 | 19 | 18 | 16 | 14 |
| Almería | 11 | 21 | 9 | 11 | 16 | 20 | 19 | 21 | 21 | 21 | 18 | 21 | 19 | 20 | 16 | 17 | 20 | 17 | 19 | 20 | 20 | 21 | 19 | 20 | 20 | 22 | 22 | 21 | 20 | 21 | 20 | 20 | 19 | 19 | 19 | 16 | 16 | 17 | 17 | 17 | 18 | 15 |
| Zaragoza | 1 | 3 | 1 | 2 | 2 | 4 | 6 | 7 | 8 | 14 | 15 | 9 | 11 | 6 | 10 | 11 | 14 | 11 | 8 | 11 | 13 | 14 | 15 | 12 | 14 | 14 | 14 | 13 | 14 | 15 | 14 | 13 | 12 | 11 | 11 | 11 | 14 | 13 | 13 | 15 | 13 | 16 |
| Numancia | 19 | 19 | 18 | 19 | 11 | 15 | 10 | 11 | 11 | 13 | 16 | 20 | 20 | 21 | 17 | 19 | 15 | 18 | 15 | 15 | 12 | 13 | 11 | 9 | 8 | 9 | 10 | 10 | 10 | 13 | 13 | 11 | 14 | 12 | 12 | 12 | 12 | 11 | 15 | 14 | 15 | 17 |
| Alcorcón | 15 | 22 | 20 | 13 | 20 | 21 | 20 | 15 | 20 | 20 | 21 | 18 | 21 | 16 | 20 | 15 | 19 | 15 | 17 | 17 | 18 | 15 | 13 | 14 | 15 | 15 | 16 | 17 | 17 | 17 | 19 | 19 | 20 | 20 | 20 | 20 | 20 | 18 | 18 | 19 | 19 | 18 |
| UCAM | 22 | 20 | 19 | 20 | 12 | 8 | 7 | 8 | 10 | 16 | 17 | 19 | 15 | 17 | 21 | 18 | 21 | 21 | 21 | 21 | 21 | 19 | 20 | 17 | 18 | 18 | 15 | 16 | 16 | 14 | 15 | 15 | 15 | 18 | 17 | 14 | 15 | 15 | 14 | 16 | 17 | 19 |
| Mallorca | 18 | 16 | 17 | 22 | 19 | 16 | 17 | 19 | 15 | 18 | 14 | 15 | 14 | 10 | 11 | 13 | 17 | 19 | 20 | 18 | 17 | 18 | 18 | 19 | 17 | 17 | 20 | 20 | 19 | 20 | 21 | 21 | 21 | 21 | 21 | 21 | 21 | 21 | 20 | 20 | 20 | 20 |
| Elche | 2 | 8 | 4 | 3 | 9 | 7 | 8 | 12 | 12 | 8 | 7 | 11 | 13 | 9 | 12 | 8 | 12 | 12 | 10 | 12 | 14 | 12 | 12 | 13 | 13 | 11 | 11 | 12 | 12 | 11 | 12 | 14 | 11 | 13 | 15 | 18 | 18 | 20 | 21 | 21 | 21 | 21 |
| Mirandés | 14 | 13 | 6 | 6 | 4 | 6 | 4 | 4 | 4 | 5 | 10 | 14 | 18 | 19 | 19 | 21 | 18 | 20 | 18 | 19 | 19 | 20 | 21 | 21 | 21 | 20 | 21 | 22 | 22 | 22 | 22 | 22 | 22 | 22 | 22 | 22 | 22 | 22 | 22 | 22 | 22 | 22 |

Notes: The table lists the positions of teams after each week of matches. In order to preserve chronological evolvements, any postponed matches are not included to the round at which they were originally scheduled, but added to the full round they were played immediately afterwards. For example, if a match is scheduled for matchday 13, but then postponed and played between days 16 and 17, it will be added to the standings for day 17.

== Results ==
| Home \ Away | ALC | ALM | CAD | COR | ELC | GET | GIM | GIR | HUE | LEV | LUG | MLL | MIR | NUM | OVI | RAY | REU | SAT | TFE | UCM | VAD | ZAR |
|---|---|---|---|---|---|---|---|---|---|---|---|---|---|---|---|---|---|---|---|---|---|---|
| Alcorcón | — | 0–0 | 0–2 | 0–1 | 1–0 | 0–3 | 1–0 | 2–1 | 0–0 | 2–0 | 3–0 | 1–0 | 1–0 | 2–3 | 5–1 | 2–0 | 1–0 | 0–0 | 1–3 | 0–0 | 1–2 | 1–1 |
| Almería | 3–1 | — | 1–1 | 3–1 | 2–1 | 0–1 | 3–0 | 0–0 | 0–0 | 2–2 | 0–0 | 2–1 | 2–0 | 2–0 | 3–0 | 3–0 | 1–0 | 2–1 | 0–1 | 2–3 | 0–3 | 2–2 |
| Cádiz | 4–1 | 1–0 | — | 1–1 | 2–1 | 3–0 | 0–0 | 0–0 | 1–0 | 1–1 | 1–1 | 1–1 | 2–1 | 1–0 | 0–2 | 1–0 | 0–0 | 4–1 | 0–1 | 2–2 | 0–1 | 3–0 |
| Córdoba | 1–0 | 1–0 | 1–3 | — | 1–0 | 1–3 | 2–0 | 2–1 | 0–2 | 1–0 | 3–3 | 0–2 | 1–1 | 0–0 | 4–2 | 0–0 | 1–0 | 0–1 | 1–0 | 1–1 | 1–1 | 2–1 |
| Elche | 0–0 | 2–3 | 2–3 | 1–1 | — | 2–2 | 4–4 | 1–0 | 1–1 | 0–1 | 0–3 | 1–0 | 0–1 | 1–3 | 0–2 | 2–1 | 1–1 | 3–2 | 3–1 | 1–1 | 2–0 | 0–3 |
| Getafe | 1–0 | 4–0 | 3–2 | 2–0 | 2–0 | — | 1–1 | 0–2 | 1–1 | 2–0 | 2–0 | 1–1 | 1–1 | 0–0 | 2–1 | 1–0 | 1–1 | 2–0 | 2–2 | 2–0 | 3–1 | 1–0 |
| Gimnàstic | 1–1 | 0–1 | 1–0 | 2–1 | 1–3 | 1–0 | — | 3–1 | 0–0 | 1–1 | 2–2 | 2–2 | 4–1 | 2–0 | 2–2 | 0–1 | 0–1 | 1–1 | 1–1 | 1–0 | 1–2 | 0–0 |
| Girona | 0–0 | 3–3 | 1–2 | 2–0 | 3–1 | 5–1 | 4–2 | — | 3–1 | 2–1 | 3–1 | 1–0 | 1–1 | 3–0 | 0–0 | 1–3 | 1–0 | 2–0 | 1–1 | 1–2 | 2–1 | 0–0 |
| Huesca | 0–1 | 2–0 | 1–1 | 3–0 | 0–3 | 0–0 | 1–1 | 1–2 | — | 0–2 | 1–0 | 2–1 | 3–0 | 0–0 | 4–0 | 2–0 | 2–1 | 2–1 | 2–2 | 5–2 | 1–0 | 2–3 |
| Levante | 2–0 | 1–0 | 0–0 | 3–1 | 2–1 | 1–1 | 2–1 | 2–1 | 1–2 | — | 1–0 | 2–1 | 2–1 | 1–0 | 1–0 | 1–0 | 0–0 | 1–0 | 1–0 | 3–1 | 3–2 | 4–2 |
| Lugo | 1–0 | 1–2 | 0–1 | 1–0 | 1–2 | 0–1 | 2–3 | 1–2 | 1–1 | 1–0 | — | 3–1 | 2–1 | 3–1 | 2–1 | 1–0 | 1–0 | 1–0 | 1–3 | 0–0 | 1–0 | 3–3 |
| Mallorca | 1–0 | 1–0 | 0–0 | 1–1 | 1–0 | 3–3 | 0–0 | 1–0 | 3–0 | 1–1 | 1–1 | — | 2–0 | 0–0 | 0–0 | 2–1 | 0–1 | 2–2 | 1–4 | 0–0 | 0–3 | 2–2 |
| Mirandés | 2–0 | 2–1 | 3–2 | 1–1 | 1–0 | 1–1 | 0–1 | 0–2 | 1–3 | 0–3 | 2–2 | 2–2 | — | 0–3 | 0–2 | 2–1 | 1–1 | 0–1 | 3–2 | 1–1 | 2–2 | 0–1 |
| Numancia | 1–1 | 1–0 | 0–3 | 1–1 | 2–2 | 2–0 | 1–0 | 0–2 | 0–0 | 0–1 | 0–1 | 3–1 | 0–2 | — | 0–0 | 0–0 | 1–0 | 1–2 | 1–1 | 1–0 | 2–1 | 2–1 |
| Oviedo | 0–1 | 2–0 | 2–1 | 1–2 | 2–1 | 2–1 | 1–0 | 2–0 | 1–1 | 2–0 | 1–1 | 2–1 | 0–0 | 2–2 | — | 2–0 | 0–1 | 1–0 | 2–0 | 2–0 | 1–0 | 0–0 |
| Rayo Vallecano | 2–0 | 1–0 | 3–0 | 1–2 | 1–1 | 2–0 | 2–0 | 1–0 | 2–2 | 2–1 | 2–0 | 1–0 | 1–2 | 3–3 | 2–0 | — | 0–0 | 1–1 | 1–1 | 0–1 | 0–0 | 1–2 |
| Reus | 0–0 | 1–0 | 1–0 | 1–2 | 0–1 | 1–1 | 1–0 | 1–2 | 0–1 | 0–1 | 2–1 | 1–1 | 1–1 | 1–1 | 1–1 | 1–1 | — | 2–1 | 0–0 | 0–0 | 2–0 | 1–0 |
| Sevilla Atlético | 1–1 | 1–0 | 3–3 | 1–0 | 2–0 | 2–1 | 2–2 | 3–3 | 2–0 | 1–1 | 1–1 | 2–3 | 1–0 | 1–1 | 5–3 | 1–2 | 0–1 | — | 0–0 | 1–1 | 6–2 | 2–1 |
| Tenerife | 2–0 | 1–0 | 1–1 | 2–0 | 2–0 | 0–0 | 0–1 | 3–3 | 1–1 | 0–0 | 2–1 | 0–0 | 1–1 | 1–1 | 1–0 | 3–2 | 0–1 | 1–1 | — | 2–1 | 1–0 | 1–0 |
| UCAM Murcia | 0–1 | 4–0 | 1–1 | 1–1 | 1–1 | 2–0 | 1–1 | 0–1 | 3–1 | 0–2 | 1–2 | 1–1 | 2–2 | 3–2 | 0–1 | 0–1 | 0–2 | 1–0 | 1–0 | — | 1–3 | 1–0 |
| Valladolid | 2–0 | 0–0 | 1–0 | 2–1 | 2–1 | 1–0 | 1–2 | 2–1 | 1–2 | 0–4 | 1–1 | 2–1 | 5–0 | 1–1 | 1–0 | 2–1 | 1–0 | 2–0 | 0–0 | 0–1 | — | 0–0 |
| Zaragoza | 2–0 | 2–1 | 1–1 | 1–1 | 1–3 | 1–2 | 1–2 | 0–2 | 1–0 | 0–1 | 1–1 | 1–0 | 2–0 | 3–0 | 2–1 | 1–1 | 2–2 | 1–2 | 1–2 | 3–1 | 1–1 | — |

Source: La Liga
Legend: Blue = home team win; Yellow = draw; Red = away team win.

== Promotion play-offs ==
Teams placed between 3rd and 6th position (excluding reserve teams) took part in the promotion play-offs. The first leg of the semi-finals was played on 14 and 15 June and the second leg on 17 and 18 June at home of the best positioned team. The final was also two-legged, with the first leg on 21 June and the second leg on 24 June, with the best positioned team also playing the second leg at home.

Semi-finals
Cádiz | 1 | 0 | 1
Tenerife (b.p.) | 0 | 1 | 1
Huesca | 2 | 0 | 2
Getafe | 2 | 3 | 5

Final
Tenerife | 1 | 1 | 2
Getafe | 0 | 3 | 3

== Season statistics ==
=== Top goalscorers ===
| Rank | Player | Club | Goals |
|---|---|---|---|
| 1 | (Spain) Joselu | Lugo | 23 |
| 2 | (Spain) Roger | Levante | 22 |
| 3 | (Spain) Ángel | Zaragoza | 21 |
| 4 | (Spain) Jorge Molina | Getafe | 20 |
| 5 | (Spain) Alfredo Ortuño | Cádiz | 17 |
| 6 | (Spain) Toché | Oviedo | 16 |
| 7 | (Spain) Quique | Almería | 15 |
| 7 | (Honduras) Jona | UCAM Murcia | 15 |
| 9 | (Spain) Raúl de Tomás | Valladolid | 14 |
| 9 | (Spain) Ivi | Sevilla Atlético | 14 |
| 9 | (Italy) Samuele Longo | Girona | 14 |

=== Zamora Trophy ===
The Zamora Trophy is awarded by newspaper Marca to the goalkeeper with least goals-to-games ratio. Keepers must play at least 28 games of 60 or more minutes to be eligible for the trophy.

| Rank | Player | Club | GA | GP | Avg |
|---|---|---|---|---|---|
| 1 | (Spain) Raúl Fernández | Levante | 22 | 33 | 0.67 |
| 2 | (Spain) Édgar | Reus | 29 | 42 | 0.69 |
| 3 | (Venezuela) Dani Hernández | Tenerife | 32 | 37 | 0.86 |
| 4 | (Spain) Alberto Cifuentes | Cádiz | 39 | 41 | 0.95 |
| 5 | (Spain) Sergio Herrera | Huesca | 41 | 41 | 1.00 |

=== Hat-tricks ===
| Player | For | Against | Result | Date | Round | Reference |
|---|---|---|---|---|---|---|
| (Spain) Brandon | Mallorca | Huesca | 3–0 (H) | 9 October 2016 | 9 | |
| (Spain) Marc Gual | Sevilla Atlético | Valladolid | 6–2 (H) | 16 April 2017 | 34 | |

(H) – Home; (A) – Away

== Attendances ==
| Pos | Team | Total | High | Low | Average | Change |
|---|---|---|---|---|---|---|
| 1 | Zaragoza | 331,003 | 21,343 | 11,847 | 15,762 | −5.7% |
| 3 | Cádiz | 303,794 | 22,034 | 8,987 | 13,809 | +48.1%^{2} |
| 2 | Oviedo | 284,508 | 18,281 | 8,098 | 13,548 | −2.5% |
| 4 | Tenerife | 284,899 | 21,450 | 6,652 | 12,387 | +36.0% |
| 5 | Córdoba | 257,943 | 15,849 | 8,552 | 12,283 | −13.6% |
| 6 | Levante | 254,417 | 18,381 | 10,133 | 12,115 | −11.2%^{1} |
| 7 | Mallorca | 192,118 | 14,016 | 3,618 | 9,148 | +7.1% |
| 8 | Rayo Vallecano | 174,312 | 11,789 | 6,772 | 8,301 | −27.8%^{1} |
| 9 | Valladolid | 172,211 | 12,812 | 4,881 | 8,201 | −3.2% |
| 10 | Almería | 158,129 | 11,121 | 5,949 | 7,530 | −3.2% |
| 11 | Elche | 157,245 | 14,482 | 2,560 | 7,488 | −17.8% |
| 12 | Getafe | 164,396 | 15,380 | 3,850 | 7,148 | −2.2%^{1} |
| 14 | Girona | 115,110 | 8,824 | 2,358 | 5,481 | +20.7% |
| 13 | Gimnàstic | 112,708 | 9,409 | 3,512 | 5,367 | −18.1% |
| 15 | Sevilla Atlético | 98,892 | 18,170 | 1,646 | 4,709 | n/a^{2} |
| 16 | UCAM Murcia | 82,097 | 5,877 | 2,040 | 3,909 | +87.5%^{2} |
| 17 | Reus | 80,537 | 4,192 | 3,078 | 3,835 | n/a^{2} |
| 18 | Lugo | 76,218 | 5,987 | 2,466 | 3,629 | −0.7% |
| 19 | Huesca | 75,942 | 4,867 | 2,447 | 3,452 | +19.7% |
| 20 | Mirandés | 65,695 | 4,129 | 1,534 | 3,128 | −9.5% |
| 21 | Numancia | 61,145 | 4,571 | 2,104 | 2,912 | −1.0% |
| 22 | Alcorcón | 56,563 | 4,077 | 1,532 | 2,693 | +6.4% |
| | League total | 3,559,882 | 22,034 | 1,532 | 7,607 | +1.0% |

Source: LaLiga.es boxscores
Notes:
1: Team played last season in La Liga.
2: Team played last season in Segunda División B.

== Awards ==
| Month | Manager of the Month | | Player of the Month | | Reference |
| Month | Manager | Club | Player | Club | Reference |
|---|---|---|---|---|---|
| August | (Spain) Juan Ramón López Muñiz | Levante | (Spain) Ángel | Zaragoza | |
| September | (Spain) Carlos Terrazas | Mirandés | (Spain) Joselu | Lugo | |
| October | (Spain) Diego Martínez | Sevilla Atlético | (Spain) Brandon | Mallorca | |
| November | (Spain) Pablo Machín | Girona | (Spain) Pablo Valcarce | Numancia | |
| December | (Spain) Álvaro Cervera | Cádiz | (Spain) Alfredo Ortuño | Cádiz | |
| January | (Spain) Paco Herrera | Valladolid | (Spain) Toché | Oviedo | |
| February | (Spain) José Luis Martí | Tenerife | (Spain) Roger | Levante | |
| March | (Spain) Juan Antonio Anquela | Huesca | (Spain) Quique | Almería | |
| April | (Spain) Míchel | Rayo Vallecano | (Spain) Jorge Molina | Getafe | |
| May | (Spain) Paco Herrera | Valladolid | (Honduras) Anthony Lozano | Tenerife | |
