= 1998–99 SD Eibar season =

SD Eibar
1998–99 season
- Head coach: Alfonso Barasoain
- Stadium: Ipurua Municipal Stadium
- Segunda División: 19th
- Copa del Rey: First round
- Top goalscorer: League: Igor Arenaza (7); All: Igor Arenaza (7)

The 1998–99 season was the 47th season in the history of SD Eibar and their third consecutive season in the second division. The club participated in the Segunda División and the Copa del Rey. The season covered the period from 1 July 1998 to 30 June 1999.

== Competitions ==
=== Overall record ===
Competition	First match	Last match	Starting round	Final position	Record							
Competition	First match	Last match	Starting round	Final position	Pld	W	D	L	GF	GA	GD	Win %
Segunda División	30 August 1998	19 June 1999	Matchday 1	19th	42	13	8	21	42	56	−14	30.95
Copa del Rey	2 September 1998	9 September 1998	First round	First round	2	0	2	0	1	1	+0	0.00
Total					44	13	10	21	43	57	−14	29.55

Source: Competitions

==== League table ====
Pos	Team	Pld	W	D	L	GF	GA	GD	Pts	Promotion, qualification or relegation
16	Logroñés	42	12	12	18	48	57	−9	48	
17	Leganés	42	10	17	15	36	44	−8	47	
18	Eibar	42	13	8	21	42	56	−14	47	
19	Mallorca B (R)	42	12	10	20	52	64	−12	46	Relegation to Segunda División B
20	Barcelona B (R)	42	13	5	24	51	68	−17	44	Relegation to Segunda División B

Rules for classification: 1st points; 2nd head-to-head points; 3rd head-to-head goal difference; 4th head-to-head goals scored; 5th goal difference; 6th number of goals scored; 7th Fair-play points
(R) Relegated

==== Results summary ====
Overall								Home						Away					
Pld	W	D	L	GF	GA	GD	Pts	W	D	L	GF	GA	GD	W	D	L	GF	GA	GD
42	13	8	21	42	56	−14	47	8	5	8	23	20	+3	5	3	13	19	36	−17

Source: Segunda División

==== Results by round ====
Round	1	2	3	4	5	6	7	8	9	10	11	12	13	14	15	16	17	18	19	20	21	22	23	24	25	26	27	28	29	30	31	32	33	34	35	36	37	38	39	40	41	42
Ground	A	H	A	H	A	H	A	H	A	H	A	H	A	H	A	H	A	H	A	H	A	H	A	H	A	H	A	H	A	H	A	H	A	H	A	H	A	H	A	H	A	H
Result	L	W	L	L	L	L	D	D	L	L	L	W	L	W	L	L	L	W	D	L	W	D	L	L	W	W	L	D	L	L	L	L	L	D	W	D	D	W	W	W	W	W
Position																																										

Source: Segunda División
A = Away; H = Home; W = Win; D = Draw; L = Loss

==== Matches ====
30 August 1998 1	Málaga	2–1	Eibar	Málaga
--:-- CET (UTC+1)				Stadium: La Rosaleda

6 September 1998 2	Eibar	2–1	Sporting Gijón	Eibar
--:-- CEST (UTC+2)				Stadium: Ipurua Municipal Stadium

12 September 1998 3	Las Palmas	3–0	Eibar	Las Palmas
--:-- CET (UTC+1)				Stadium: Insular

19 September 1998 4	Eibar	0–1	Mallorca B	Eibar
--:-- CET (UTC+1)				Stadium: Ipurua

=== Copa del Rey ===
==== First round ====
2 September 1998 First leg	Beasain	0–0	Eibar	Beasain
--:-- CEST (UTC+2)

9 September 1998 Second leg	Eibar	1–1 (1 (a)–1 agg.)	Beasain	Eibar
--:-- CEST (UTC+2)				Stadium: Ipurua Municipal Stadium
