= Carlos Pouso =

Spanish footballer and manager

Personal information
- Full name: Juan Carlos Pouso Lejonagoitia
- Date of birth: 30 July 1960 (age 66)
- Place of birth: Leioa, Spain
- Position: Forward

Senior career*
| Years | Team | Apps | (Gls) |
| 1977–1980 | Arenas Getxo | 71 | (7) |
| 1980–1981 | Sestao | 9 | (0) |
| 1981–1982 | Erandio | 14 | (0) |
| Total | | 94 | (7) |

Managerial career
- Ugeraga (youth)
- Mungia (youth)
- –1996: Sodupe
- 1996–2000: Moraza
- 2000–2002: Arenas Getxo
- 2003–2008: Sestao
- 2008–2009: Eibar
- 2010: Guijuelo
- 2010–2013: Mirandés
- 2014–2016: UD Logroñés
- 2018: Racing Santander
- 2019–2020: Pontevedra
- 2021: Recreativo
- 2022–2024: Calahorra
- 2024–2025: SD Logroñés
- * Club domestic league appearances and goals

Juan Carlos Pouso Lejonagoitia (born 30 July 1960) is a Spanish former footballer who played as a forward, currently a manager.

He played no higher than Segunda División B, and spent most of his managerial career of over two decades at that same level. He led Eibar and Mirandés for one season each in the Segunda División.

== Career ==
Born in Leioa, Basque Country, Pouso began working as a professional manager in 2000 with Arenas de Getxo. He was appointed at neighbouring Sestao River Club three years later, achieving two promotions to Segunda División B with the latter team.

On 17 June 2008, Pouso became coach of Segunda División club SD Eibar, being granted a one-year leave from his job in the shipbuilding industry in order to fully dedicate himself to his new line of work. He was sacked in March 2009 after a poor run of results, being replaced by Josu Uribe as the season ended in relegation.

Pouso returned to the third tier in late January 2010 when he was named manager of CD Guijuelo with the aim of avoiding relegation, which was eventually met. He signed with CD Mirandés in the same league on 1 June, leading them to division two for the first time in their history in his second year and reaching the semi-finals of the Copa del Rey in the process.

On 30 June 2013, Mirandés decided not to renew Pouso's contract even though he managed to finish above the relegation zone. In May 2014, he was appointed at UD Logroñés in the third division, leading his team to consecutive presences in the promotion play-offs albeit without success; having resigned from his post in November 2016, he became their director of football.

On 6 February 2018, Pouso joined Racing de Santander on a deal until the end of the campaign, replacing the fired Ángel Viadero. He returned to work in November the following year, at Pontevedra CF.

Pouso was removed from his post at the Galician club in February 2020 after a run of eight games without a win, though he stayed in other functions until the end of the season. Thirteen months later, he was back at work at a Recreativo de Huelva side facing relegation from the third tier. He was unable to prevent El Decano from suffering an unprecedented double descent to the fifth division following a restructuring of the Spanish football league system.

On 26 December 2022, after more than a year without a club, Pouso was appointed at CD Calahorra in the Primera Federación, replacing the dismissed Juan García. He left at the end of the 2023–24 campaign, ended in relegation to Segunda Federación.

On 2 June 2024, Pouso took over at SD Logroñés also in the fourth tier. One year later, he returned to Sestao as sporting director.

== Managerial statistics ==
As of match played 18 May 2025

Managerial record by team and tenure
| Team | From | To | Record | | | | | | | | Ref |
| Team | From | To | G | W | D | L | GF | GA | GD | Win % | Ref |
|---|---|---|---|---|---|---|---|---|---|---|---|
| Moraza | 1 July 1996 | 30 June 2000 | 140 | 66 | 36 | 38 | 236 | 155 | +81 | 47.14 | |
| Arenas Getxo | 1 July 2000 | 30 June 2002 | 76 | 28 | 22 | 26 | 101 | 75 | +26 | 36.84 | |
| Sestao | 1 July 2003 | 18 June 2008 | 204 | 93 | 58 | 53 | 255 | 163 | +92 | 45.59 | |
| Eibar | 18 June 2008 | 9 March 2009 | 28 | 7 | 6 | 15 | 20 | 38 | −18 | 25.00 | |
| Guijuelo | 26 January 2010 | 1 June 2010 | 18 | 6 | 10 | 2 | 24 | 14 | +10 | 33.33 | |
| Mirandés | 1 June 2010 | 30 June 2013 | 141 | 68 | 41 | 32 | 175 | 127 | +48 | 48.23 | |
| UD Logroñés | 29 May 2014 | 14 November 2016 | 101 | 42 | 31 | 28 | 121 | 94 | +27 | 41.58 | |
| Racing Santander | 6 February 2018 | 14 May 2018 | 14 | 7 | 3 | 4 | 17 | 15 | +2 | 50.00 | |
| Pontevedra | 4 November 2019 | 18 February 2020 | 15 | 4 | 4 | 7 | 14 | 19 | −5 | 26.67 | |
| Recreativo | 23 March 2021 | 24 May 2021 | 8 | 1 | 0 | 7 | 7 | 11 | −4 | 12.50 | |
| Calahorra | 26 December 2022 | 6 May 2024 | 55 | 18 | 12 | 25 | 56 | 68 | −12 | 32.73 | |
| SD Logroñés | 2 June 2024 | 19 May 2025 | 36 | 19 | 10 | 7 | 56 | 32 | +24 | 52.78 | |
| Total | | | 836 | 359 | 233 | 244 | 1,082 | 811 | +271 | 42.94 | — |

== Honours ==
=== Manager ===
Sestao River

- Tercera División: 2003–04, 2005–06

Mirandés

- Segunda División B: 2011–12
