= Pablo Alfaro =

Spanish football player and manager

Personal information
- Full name: Pablo Alfaro Armengot
- Date of birth: 26 April 1969 (age 57)
- Place of birth: Zaragoza, Spain
- Height: 1.85 m (6 ft 1 in)
- Position: Centre-back

Youth career
- Zaragoza

Senior career*
Years	Team	Apps	(Gls)
1986–1989	Zaragoza B	77	(4)
1989–1992	Zaragoza	107	(2)
1992–1993	Barcelona	7	(1)
1993–1996	Racing Santander	108	(1)
1996–1997	Atlético Madrid	11	(0)
1997–2000	Mérida	97	(0)
2000–2005	Sevilla	164	(3)
2006–2007	Racing Santander	22	(1)
Total		593	(12)

International career
1998–2006	Aragon	3	(0)

Managerial career
- 2009–2010: Pontevedra
- 2010: Recreativo
- 2012–2013: Leganés
- 2013: Huesca
- 2014–2015: Marbella
- 2017–2018: Mirandés
- 2019–2020: Ibiza
- 2020–2021: Córdoba
- 2022–2023: San Fernando
- 2023–2024: Murcia
- 2026: Gimnàstic
- * Club domestic league appearances and goals

Pablo Alfaro Armengot (born 26 April 1969) is a Spanish former professional footballer who played as a central defender. He is currently a manager.

In his career, in which he represented six teams – most notably Sevilla – he amassed La Liga totals of 418 matches and seven goals over 15 seasons, receiving a total of 18 red cards and being sent off nearly 30 times.

Alfaro embarked on a managerial career in the late 2000s.

== Playing career ==
Born in Zaragoza, Alfaro started his career with his hometown club Real Zaragoza. He made his La Liga debut on 3 September 1989 in a 3–0 home win against Rayo Vallecano, and he only missed one league game in his debut season as they finished in ninth position.

In the summer of 1992, Alfaro signed with FC Barcelona, being rarely used in his only season in Catalonia. He went on to represent Racing de Santander and Atlético Madrid, being an undisputed starter with the former but only second or third choice with the latter.

Alfaro joined CP Mérida for the 1997–98 campaign, playing all but four matches as the Extremadurans were relegated from the top flight and collecting 12 yellow cards and two red in the process. In 1999–2000, the side finished sixth in the Segunda División but was relegated again, due to financial irregularities.

In the 2000 off-season, the veteran moved to Sevilla FC also in division two, helping the Andalusia team to return to the top division in his first season. During his spell, Alfaro formed a fearsome partnership with Javi Navarro, but following the emergence of youth graduate Sergio Ramos and the January 2006 arrival of Julien Escudé, he became a secondary defensive unit, leaving in that transfer window to former side Racing and scoring a rare but crucial goal on 7 May in a 2–1 home win against CA Osasuna to help them to barely avoid top-tier relegation.

== Coaching career ==
Alfaro retired from football at the end of the 2006–07 season aged nearly 38, having appeared in exactly 600 official games as a professional. Two years later he started his coaching career, with Segunda División B team Pontevedra CF, leading the Galicians to the fourth position in the regular season, albeit with no subsequent play-off promotion.

Alfaro upgraded a division on 17 June 2010, signing with Recreativo de Huelva. Exactly four months later, after only four draws in eight matches, he was fired by the oldest club in Spain.

In June 2012, Alfaro joined third-tier CD Leganés for the upcoming campaign. He took the Community of Madrid team to the play-offs, where they lost 3–2 on aggregate to Lleida Esportiu in the quarter-finals.

Alfaro returned to his native Aragon in June 2013, taking over an SD Huesca side that had just descended from the second division. Having won and drawn one each of his first five matches, he was sacked on 25 September.

On 2 December 2014, Alfaro replaced Jaime Molina as manager of Marbella FC on a deal for the end of the season. The following 23 March, as they fell into the relegation places with a fourth consecutive defeat, he was shown the door.

Alfaro returned to the second level on 28 March 2017, being appointed at last-placed CD Mirandés until June following the dismissal of Javier Álvarez de los Mozos. He remained in Miranda de Ebro after their relegation, and won their group the following season. After being eliminated 2–1 on aggregate from the play-off semi-finals by Extremadura UD, he was not offered a new deal in June 2018.

On 28 February 2019, UD Ibiza chose Alfaro as their replacement for Andrés Palop until the end of 2019–20. On 2 December of the following year, he took over fellow third-division side Córdoba CF.

On 23 December 2022, Alfaro replaced Salva Ballesta at San Fernando CD, becoming their third manager of the season. In November 2023, he was appointed at Real Murcia CF in place of the sacked Gustavo Munúa on a contract for the remainder of the campaign, leaving at its closure.

On 9 March 2026, Alfaro signed with Gimnàstic de Tarragona as their third head coach of the third-tier season. He managed to avoid relegation in the last round, leaving in June.

== Personal life ==
Alfaro majored in medicine, which he pursued while simultaneously playing football, attending different universities as he changed teams. He began at the University of Zaragoza, continued at the University of Barcelona and the University of Cantabria and finally graduated from the Complutense University of Madrid.

== Managerial statistics ==
As of match played 23 May 2026

Managerial record by team and tenure
Team	From	To	Record								Ref
Team	From	To	G	W	D	L	GF	GA	GD	Win %	Ref
Pontevedra	26 November 2009	17 June 2010	28	15	6	7	35	23	+12	53.57	
Recreativo	17 June 2010	17 October 2010	9	0	4	5	3	13	−10	0.00	
Leganés	28 June 2012	28 June 2013	40	20	11	9	59	38	+21	50.00	
Huesca	28 June 2013	25 September 2013	7	2	1	4	4	10	−6	28.57	
Marbella	2 December 2014	23 March 2015	19	6	4	9	16	24	−8	31.58	
Mirandés	28 March 2017	28 June 2018	55	28	11	16	70	56	+14	50.91	
Ibiza	28 February 2019	31 July 2020	44	24	11	9	62	33	+29	54.55	
Córdoba	2 December 2020	19 April 2021	18	8	4	6	19	16	+3	44.44	
San Fernando	23 December 2022	5 June 2023	21	7	7	7	32	31	+1	33.33	
Murcia	9 November 2023	24 June 2024	27	11	8	8	27	26	+1	40.74	
Gimnàstic	9 March 2026	5 June 2026	11	4	2	5	9	11	−2	36.36	
Total			279	125	69	85	336	281	+55	44.80	—

== Honours ==
Barcelona

- La Liga: 1992–93
- UEFA Super Cup: 1992

Sevilla

- UEFA Cup: 2005–06
- Segunda División: 2000–01

== See also ==
- List of La Liga players (400+ appearances)
