= Roberto Lombraña =

Spanish footballer

Personal information
- Full name: Roberto Lombraña Hompanera
- Date of birth: 13 November 1975 (age 50)
- Place of birth: Durango, Spain
- Height: 1.72 m (5 ft 7 1/2 in)
- Position: Midfielder

Youth career
- Durango

Senior career*
Years	Team	Apps	(Gls)
1995–1998	Durango		
1998–2001	Lemona		
2001–2003	Barakaldo	62	(2)
2003–2004	Recreación	36	(2)
2004–2006	Real Unión	54	(0)
2006–2012	Eibar	192	(2)
- * Club domestic league appearances and goals

Roberto Lombraña Hompanera (born 13 November 1975) is a Spanish retired footballer who played as a midfielder.

== Football career ==
Born in Durango, Biscay, Lombraña spent the vast majority of his 17-year senior career in Segunda División B. His professional input consisted of 66 games and one goal in Segunda División at the service of SD Eibar, being relegated at the end of the 2008–09 season.

Lombraña's younger brother, Javier (born 1977), was also a footballer. A left back, he only competed in the third level or lower.
