= AD Hogar Alcarreño =

Spanish football club

Hogar Alcarreño
- Full name: Agrupación Deportiva Hogar Alcarreño
- Founded: 1957
- Ground: Fuente de la Niña, Guadalajara, Castilla–La Mancha, Spain
- Capacity: 2,000
- President: María José Feijoo González
- Manager: Carlos Terrazas
- League: Primera Autonómica – Group 4
- 2024–25: Primera Autonómica – Group 4, 10th of 16
- Website: www.hogaralcarrenosad.es
Home colours	Away colours

Agrupación Deportiva Hogar Alcarreño is a Spanish football team located in Guadalajara, in the autonomous community of Castilla–La Mancha. Founded in 1957, they play in Primera Autonómica – Group 4, holding home matches at Estadio Municipal Fuente de la Niña, with a capacity of 2,000 spectators.

== History ==
Founded in 1957 under the name of Agrupación Deportiva Hogar del Productor Educación y Descanso, the club initially replaced dissolved CD Alcarreño in the city. In 1965, they changed name to Agrupación Deportiva Hogar Alcarreño, and played in the Madrid Football Federation until ceasing activities in 1988.

Hogar Alcarreño returned to an active status in 2012, and appointed Carlos Terrazas as their general manager on a six-year deal in May 2019. In June 2021, the club achieved a first-ever promotion to Tercera División RFEF.

== Season to season ==
Season	Tier	Division	Place	Copa del Rey
1962–63	6	3ª Reg.	3rd	
1963–64	5	2ª Reg.	1st	
1964–65	4	1ª Reg.	15th	
1965–66	4	1ª Reg.	14th	
1966–67	4	1ª Reg.	18th	
1967–68	5	2ª Reg.	14th	
1968–69	5	2ª Reg.	15th	
1969–70	5	2ª Reg.	17th	
1970–71	5	2ª Reg.	16th	
1971–72	5	2ª Reg.	12th	
1972–73	5	2ª Reg.	18th	
1973–74	5	2ª Reg.	19th	
1974–75	6	3ª Reg. P.	19th	
1975–76	7	3ª Reg.	2nd	
1976–77	6	3ª Reg. P.	14th	
1977–78	8	3ª Reg. P.		
1978–79	8	3ª Reg. P.		
1979–80	7	2ª Reg.	13th	
1980–81	7	2ª Reg.	6th	
1981–82	7	2ª Reg.	12th	

Season	Tier	Division	Place	Copa del Rey
1982–83	7	2ª Reg. P.	4th	
1983–84	6	1ª Reg.	9th	
1984–85	6	1ª Reg.	12th	
1985–86	6	1ª Reg.	17th	
1986–87	6	1ª Reg.	14th	
1987–88	6	1ª Reg.	(R)	
1988–2012	DNP			
2012–13	7	2ª Aut.	7th	
2013–14	7	2ª Aut.	5th	
2014–15	7	2ª Aut.	1st	
2015–16	6	1ª Aut.	5th	
2016–17	6	1ª Aut.	2nd	
2017–18	5	Aut. Pref.	4th	
2018–19	5	Aut. Pref.	3rd	
2019–20	5	Aut. Pref.	3rd	
2020–21	5	Aut. Pref.	1st	
2021–22	5	3ª RFEF	17th	
2022–23	6	Aut. Pref.	14th	
2023–24	6	Aut. Pref.	17th	
2024–25	7	1ª Aut.	10th	

Season	Tier	Division	Place	Copa del Rey
2025–26	7	1ª Aut.		

- 1 season in Tercera División
- 4 seasons in Tercera Federación/Tercera División RFEF
