= Eric Pérez (footballer) =

Spanish footballer

Personal information
- Full name: Eric Pérez Albarrán
- Date of birth: 18 May 2001 (age 25)
- Place of birth: Ermua, Spain
- Height: 1.81 m (5 ft 11 in)
- Position: Winger

Team information
- Current team: Eibar
- Number: 19

Youth career
- Ermua
- 2016–2020: Eibar

Senior career*
Years	Team	Apps	(Gls)
2020–2022	Eibar Urko	33	(7)
2022–2024	Vitoria	46	(6)
2024–	Eibar	1	(0)
2024–2025	→ Alcorcón (loan)	8	(0)
2025	→ Amorebieta (loan)	15	(0)
2025–2026	→ Barakaldo (loan)	26	(4)
- * Club domestic league appearances and goals as of 16 August 2026

Eric Pérez Albarrán (born 18 May 2001) is a Spanish professional footballer who plays as a left winger for SD Eibar.

== Club career ==
Born in Ermua, Biscay, Basque Country, Pérez joined SD Eibar's youth sides in 2016, from hometown side CD Ermua. After making his senior debut with second reserve team SD Eibar Urko, he renewed his contract until 2025 on 15 March 2022, being subsequently promoted to farm team CD Vitoria.

Pérez impressed with the first team during the 2024 pre-season, and renewed his link until 2027 on 6 August of that year. Late in that month, however, he was loaned to Primera Federación side AD Alcorcón, for one year.

On 4 January 2025, after being rarely used, Pérez moved to fellow third division side SD Amorebieta also in a temporary deal. On 4 July, he agreed to a one-year loan deal with Barakaldo CF of the same category.

On 13 August 2026, Pérez was definitely promoted to the first team of the Armeros, being assigned the number 19 jersey. He made his professional debut three days later, coming on as a second-half substitute for Pejiño in a 3–1 Segunda División home loss to CD Tenerife.
