= Fede Castaños =

Spanish footballer and manager

Personal information
- Full name: Federico Castaños Martínez
- Date of birth: 12 January 1959 (age 67)
- Place of birth: Bilbao, Spain
- Height: 1.74 m (5 ft 8 1/2 in)
- Position: Defender

Youth career
- Burgos

Senior career*
| Years | Team | Apps | (Gls) |
| 1977–1979 | Real Burgos | | |
| 1979–1981 | Burgos | 28 | (0) |
| 1981–1984 | Racing Santander | 80 | (2) |
| 1984–1985 | Lorca | 19 | (0) |
| 1985–1989 | Real Burgos | | |
| 1989–1990 | Numancia | | |

Managerial career
- 1999–2001: Burgos (assistant)
- 2001–2003: Burgos (youth)
- 2003–2004: Mirandés (assistant)
- 2004–2005: Burgos
- 2006–2011: Racing Santander (assistant)
- 2012: Racing Santander (caretaker)
- 2013–2014: Racing Santander (assistant)
- 2014: Arandina
- 2014–2015: Burgos
- * Club domestic league appearances and goals

Federico 'Fede' Castaños Martínez (born 12 January 1959) is a Spanish retired footballer who played as a defender, and a current manager.

== Club career ==
Born in Bilbao, Biscay, Basque Country, Castaños graduated from Burgos CF's youth setup, and made his senior debuts with the reserves, playing several seasons in Tercera División. On 18 May 1980 he made his first-team – and La Liga – debut, starting in a 0–1 loss at RCD Espanyol.

In 1981 Castaños moved to Racing de Santander also in the top division, and appeared in Segunda División in the following campaigns, representing Lorca Deportiva CF and Real Burgos (the latter also being in Segunda División B). He eventually retired with CD Numancia in the 1989–90 campaign, in the third level.

== Manager career ==
Castaños began his managerial career at newly formed Burgos CF, as an assistant manager. He was later assigned to the youth setup before being appointed assistant at CD Mirandés.

In the 2004 summer Castaños returned to Burgos, being appointed first-team manager. He finished third during the season, but failed to promote in the play-offs.

In 2006 Castaños was appointed Miguel Ángel Portugal's assistant at Racing de Santander. On 29 November 2011 he was appointed caretaker, along with Juanjo González and Pablo Pinillos. On 7 March of the following year, after González's sacking, he was appointed manager along Pinillos, but his reign only lasted two days, being replaced by Álvaro Cervera.

On 1 April 2014 Castaños was appointed at the helm of Arandina CF, missing out promotion in the play-offs and resigning on 10 June. Three days later he was appointed Burgos manager.
