= Alfonso Barasoain =

Spanish footballer and manager (1958–2021)

Personal information
- Full name: Alfonso Barasoain Carrillero
- Date of birth: 28 January 1958
- Place of birth: Mungia, Spain
- Date of death: 25 May 2021 (aged 63)
- Position: Midfielder

Senior career*
Years	Team	Apps	(Gls)
1974–1980	Guernica	91	(11)

Managerial career
- 1983–1984: Amorebieta
- 1985–1986: Barakaldo
- 1986–1990: Eibar
- 1991: Palamós
- 1991–1993: Barakaldo
- 1994–1995: Amurrio
- 1998–1999: Eibar
- 2001–2002: Gernika
- 2006–2007: Gimnástica Segoviana
- 2007–2008: Eldense (assistant)
- 2009–2011: Amorebieta
- 2011: Sestao
- 2011–2012: Lemona
- * Club domestic league appearances and goals

Alfonso Barasoain Carrillero (28 January 1958 – 25 May 2021) was a Spanish football manager and former player who played as a midfielder.
