= SD Eibar =

Spanish Association Football Club

Eibar
- Full name: Sociedad Deportiva Eibar, S.A.D.
- Nicknames: Armagiñak / Los Armeros (The Gunsmiths); Azulgranas (Blue-and-Carmines)
- Short name: EIB
- Founded: 30 November 1940; 85 years ago as Eibar Football Club
- Stadium: Estadio Municipal de Ipurúa
- Capacity: 8,164
- President: Amaia Gorostiza
- Head coach: Jokin Aranbarri
- League: Segunda División
- 2025–26: Segunda División, 8th of 22
- Website: sdeibar.com
Home colours	Away colours

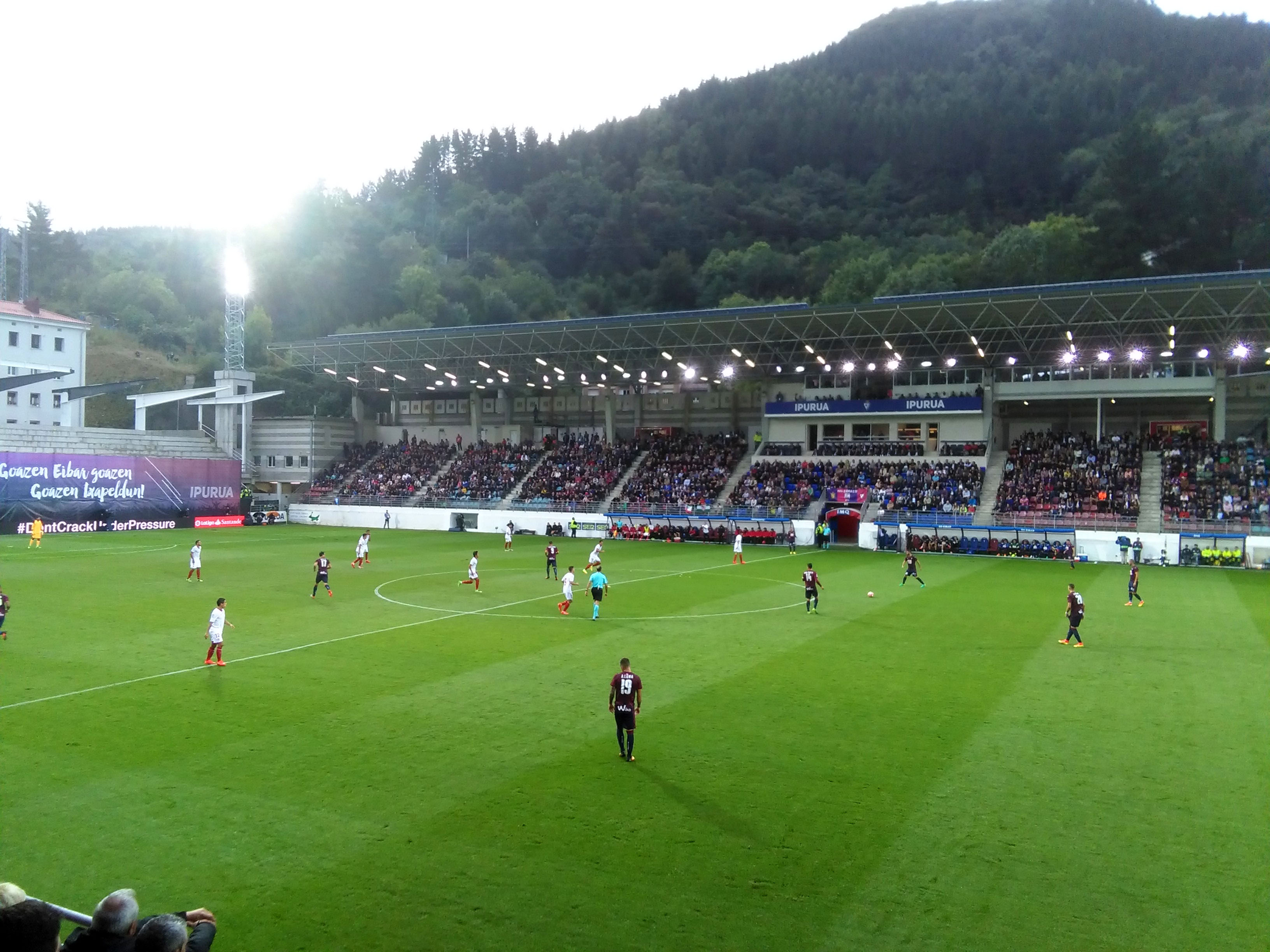
Ipurúa stadium

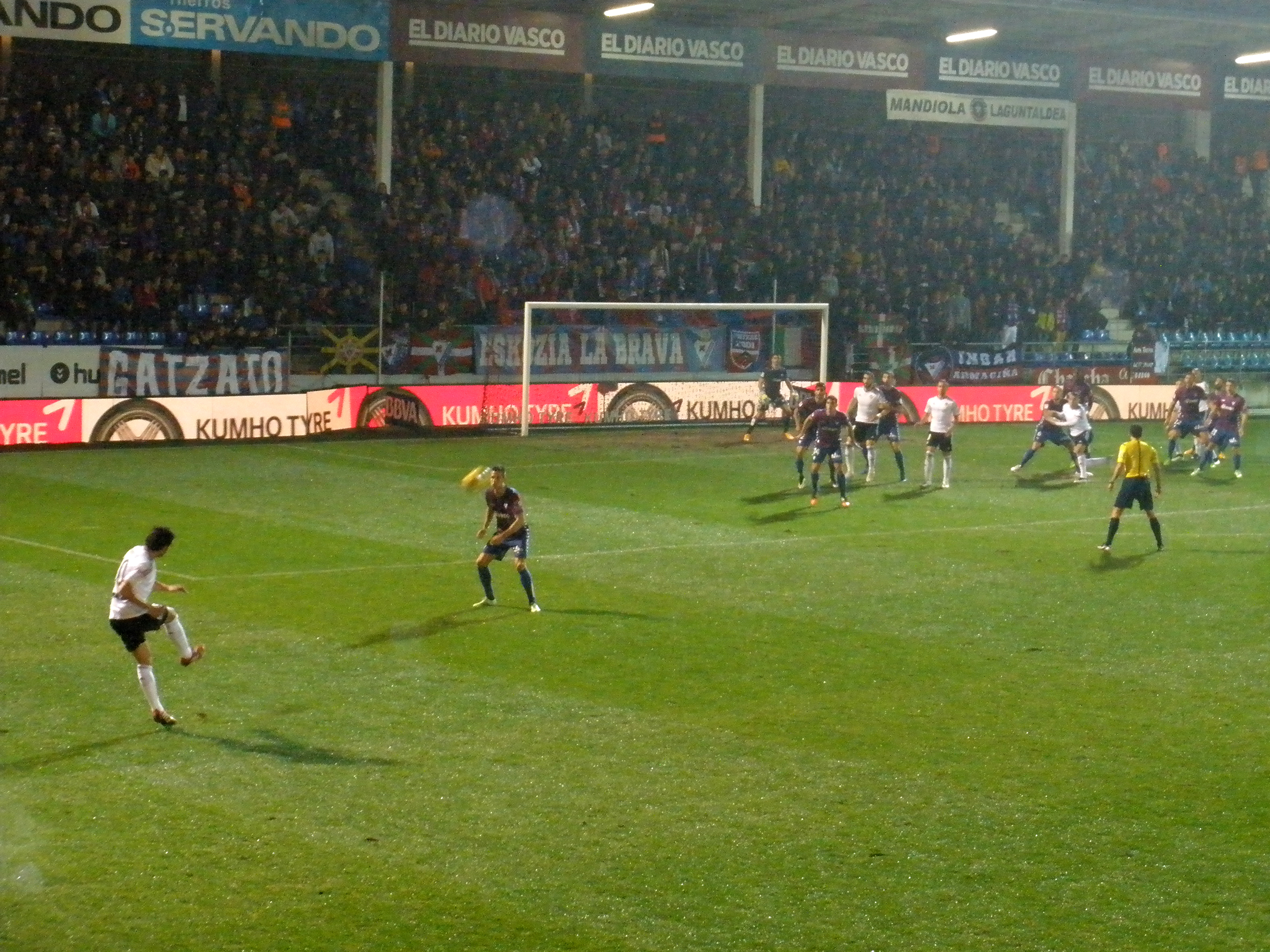
SD Eibar vs Valencia CF

Sociedad Deportiva Eibar, S.A.D. (in Basque: Eibar Kirol Elkartea) is a Spanish professional football club based in Eibar, Gipuzkoa, in the autonomous Basque Country.

Founded on 30 November 1940, the men’s team currently plays in the Segunda División, the second tier of Spanish football, having been relegated from La Liga at the end of the 2020–21 season. The club played in the top tier of Spanish football for seven consecutive seasons from 2014 to 2021, and participated in 26 Segunda División seasons (a spell in the 1950s, and most of the 1990s and 2000s), spending the rest of their history competing at lower levels.

The team plays in claret and blue shirts with blue shorts (originating from the kit of FC Barcelona) and holds home games at the Ipurua Municipal Stadium. SD Eibar is a fan-owned club, with about 8,000 shareholders from 48 countries. Until SD Huesca qualified for the top flight in 2018, the club was considered the smallest to have played in Spain's top division, and its stadium had the lowest capacity of any La Liga teams. Although Eibar is the sole professional club of its town, it contests several Basque derbies with other clubs from the region.

Eibar is the only football club which has the quality certificate UNE-EN-ISO 9001.

== History ==
=== Establishment ===
Formed by the merger of Deportivo Gallo and Unión Deportiva Eibarresa, the club was originally known as Eibar Fútbol Club, before changing to Sociedad Deportiva Eibar. During the difficult postwar years, the team played sporadically, which caused Eibar to disappear from official competitions during the 1942–43 season. Originally an irregular team, it was not until the 1943–44 season that it was reorganised into more of a full-time unit.

=== Tercera División ===
Promoted to Tercera División in 1950, Eibar achieved promotion to Segunda División three seasons later, being relegated again after a five-year stint and competing in division three for 25 of the following 28 years (in 1977 Tercera became the fourth level, after the creation of Segunda División B). In 1988, the side returned to the "silver category". That season also included a historic moment when goalkeeper José Ignacio Garmendia scored a goal in a game against Pontevedra via a kickout from his own area.

=== Promotion to Segunda División ===
After spending 18 years in a row in Segunda División, Eibar was relegated to the third division at the end of the 2005–06 campaign. However, it won its group the next season, thereby qualifying for the promotion play-offs where it won its semi-final tie against Hospitalet 2–0 and defeated Rayo Vallecano 2–1 on aggregate in the decisive round, sealing its return after just one year. Eibar finished 21st in the 2008–09 season meaning they were relegated to the Segunda Division B.

=== Relegation to Segunda B (2009–13) ===
Eibar qualified for three straight promotion play-offs but could not get promoted to the Segunda División.

In the 2012–13 edition of the Copa del Rey, Eibar ousted Basque neighbours Athletic Bilbao – who had appeared in two of the last four finals in the tournament – on the away goals rule to reach the round-of-16 following a 1–1 draw at the San Mamés Stadium. The decisive goal was scored by Mikel Arruabarrena who played youth football with the opposition, as did manager Gaizka Garitano; the same season the team managed to return to the "silver category", following a four-year absence.

=== Segunda División and promotion to La Liga ===
In 2013–14 Eibar earned, for the first time in its history, one of two direct promotion berths to La Liga, which was certified on 25 May 2014 with a 1–0 home win against Deportivo Alavés. (they celebrated their feat with confetti originally produced by Barcelona, who wear the same colours and had anticipated winning the Spanish league title a week earlier, but that did not come to pass). Simultaneously, however, the club was threatened with relegation back to division three due to the financial inability of the S.A.D. to have a share capital of at least €2,146,525.95 before 6 August 2014. The club launched a campaign named Defiende al Eibar (Defend Eibar) with the aim of reaching the required share capital through a seasoned equity offering. On 15 July 2014 the club announced it had reached the established goal.

Eibar finished its first top-flight season in 18th, ending in relegation. However, after the season ended, 13th-placed Elche were sent to the second tier as punishment for financial mismanagement, and Eibar were reinstated.

Chart of SD Eibar league performance 1929-present

On 18 July 2015, Eibar played its 75th-anniversary game against Celtic in Ipurua (1–4). This included an inaugural ceremony on the pitch with a parade of 19th-century-clothed Basque soldiers with a Saltire and bagpipes playing "Scotland the Brave", with officials from both clubs shooting a 350 kg 19th-century cannon. Eibar stated that they invited Celtic as their opponent for the game due to the strong connection between the Basque Country and Scotland, and also due to the Scottish presence in Eibar through the years (the main supporter group is named "Eskozia la Brava", meaning "Scotland the Brave").

Under its new coach José Luis Mendilibar, Eibar finished its second top-flight season in 14th. Borja Bastón finished top ten in scoring and was named La Liga Player of the Month of October 2015, making him the first Armero to receive the award. In April 2017, Dani García became the first player to reach the milestone of 100 top division appearances for the club.

The club's 10th place in 2016–17 was improved to 9th the following season, with the latter campaign marking the first time ever that Eibar had finished as the highest-ranking of the Basque teams.

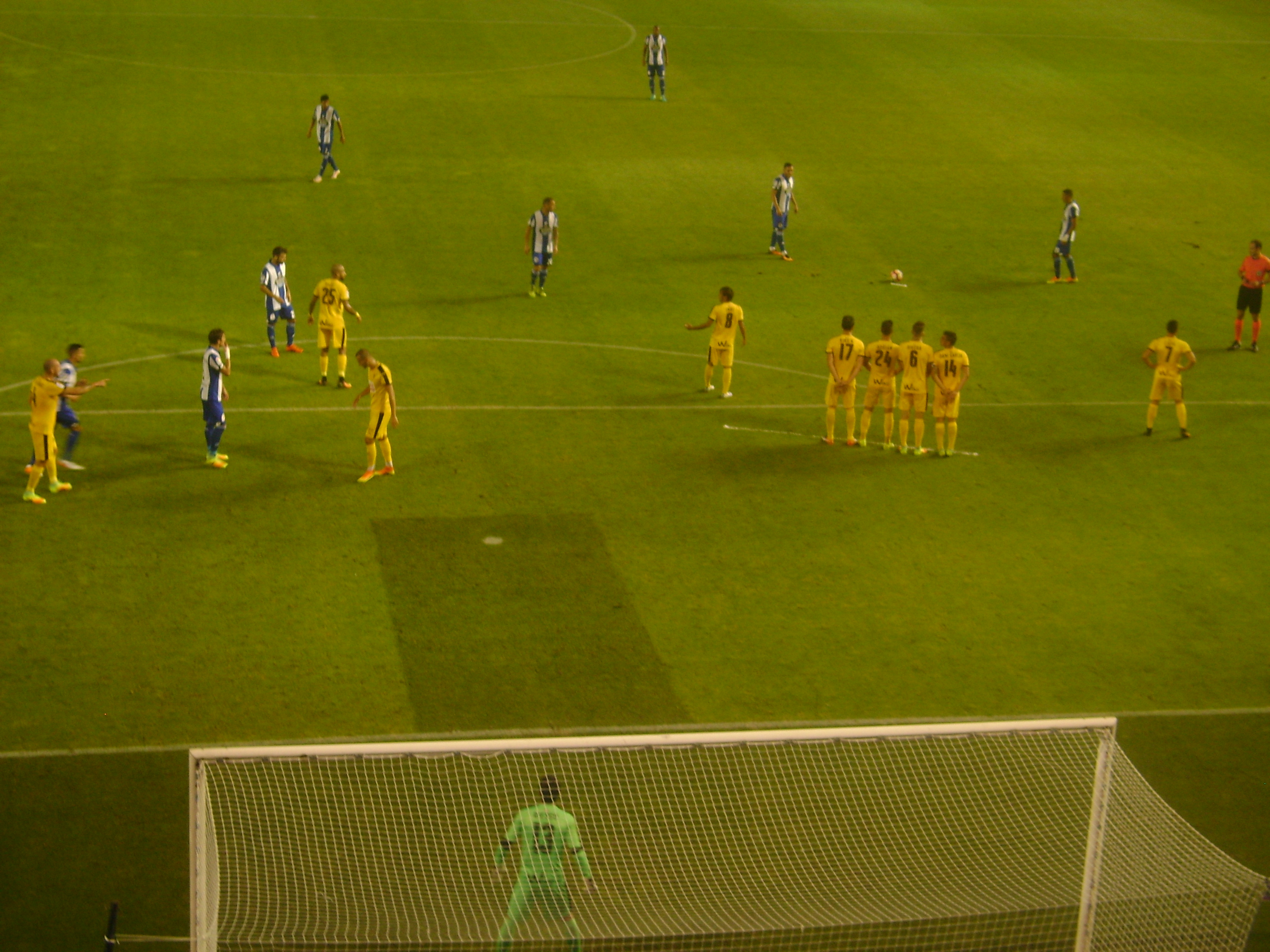
Deportivo de La Coruña vs. Eibar

On 16 May 2021, Eibar was relegated after a defeat to Valencia. This ended their seven-year stay in the top tier. The following season in Segunda, Eibar was in the top two of the league for the majority of the season, however, the team had to eventually settle for third place. In the playoffs, Eibar lost to Girona, and failed to make an immediate return to La Liga.

== Affiliated clubs ==
=== Vitoria ===
In 2015, the club signed a collaboration agreement with CD Vitoria (Tercera División) to act as an Eibar feeder team for emerging players. Eibar had previously disbanded their own B team in 2012 to cut costs while the senior side languished in Segunda División B but decided to seek a new formal arrangement for a subsidiary club after retaining their place in La Liga. Within two years of the partnership, Vitoria gained promotion to the third tier for the first time in their history; they were relegated in 2018–19 and their home matches back in the Tercera División were then moved to Eibar.

On 26 July 2024, Eibar announced that the affiliation agreement between the club and Vitoria had ended, with the team which achieved promotion to Segunda Federación being fully integrated into Eibar's structure (under Eibar B) and with Vitoria starting a new project under their new board.

=== Eibar Urko ===
In summer 2016, the club expanded its club structure further by integrating local team Urkomendi (of the 6th level Preferente de Guipúzcoa) into the organisation as a reserve team to act as a link between the youth level and Vitoria, to be known as Eibar Urko.

Playing in the town's Unbe Sports Complex, Eibar Urko gained promotion to the provincial fifth level in 2018, but were blocked from a further promotion after Vitoria were relegated to the same due to rules preventing teams owned by the same club competing in the same division. This also meant Urko could not be promoted in the 2019–20, 2020–21 or 2022–23 seasons either, as Vitoria failed to achieve the same goal. Both teams were promoted directly as group winners in their respective divisions in 2023–24.

=== Logroñés ===
Also in 2016, Eibar made a 3-year collaboration agreement with UD Logroñés, with Eibar players going on loan to the Segunda B club for experience with the aim of achieving promotion due to the additional talent in the squad. Four players made the move that summer: goalkeeper Jon Ander, defender Amelibia, midfielder Sergio García and winger Thaylor.

== Season to season ==
Season	Tier	Division	Place	Copa del Rey
1940–41	4	1ª Reg.	5th	
1941–42	4	1ª Reg.	7th	
1942–43	DNP			
1943–44	DNP			
1944–45	5	2ª Reg.	5th	
1945–46	4	1ª Reg.	9th	
1946–47	5	2ª Reg.	1st	
1947–48	4	1ª Reg.	5th	
1948–49	4	1ª Reg.	2nd	
1949–50	4	1ª Reg.	1st	
1950–51	3	3ª	1st	
1951–52	3	3ª	2nd	
1952–53	3	3ª	1st	
1953–54	2	2ª	7th	
1954–55	2	2ª	8th	
1955–56	2	2ª	14th	
1956–57	2	2ª	10th	
1957–58	2	2ª	17th	
1958–59	3	3ª	2nd	
1959–60	3	3ª	7th	

Season	Tier	Division	Place	Copa del Rey
1960–61	3	3ª	3rd	
1961–62	3	3ª	1st	
1962–63	3	3ª	1st	
1963–64	3	3ª	2nd	
1964–65	3	3ª	2nd	
1965–66	3	3ª	2nd	
1966–67	3	3ª	1st	
1967–68	3	3ª	2nd	
1968–69	3	3ª	6th	
1969–70	3	3ª	2nd	
1970–71	3	3ª	7th	First round
1971–72	3	3ª	4th	Third round
1972–73	3	3ª	12th	Second round
1973–74	3	3ª	2nd	First round
1974–75	3	3ª	16th	Third round
1975–76	3	3ª	19th	First round
1976–77	4	Reg. Pref.	5th	
1977–78	5	Reg. Pref.	3rd	
1978–79	5	Reg. Pref.	1st	
1979–80	4	3ª	4th	First round

Season	Tier	Division	Place	Copa del Rey
1980–81	4	3ª	3rd	Second round
1981–82	4	3ª	1st	Second round
1982–83	4	3ª	2nd	Third round
1983–84	4	3ª	2nd	Third round
1984–85	4	3ª	2nd	Second round
1985–86	4	3ª	1st	Third round
1986–87	3	2ª B	7th	Round of 16
1987–88	3	2ª B	1st	Third round
1988–89	2	2ª	16th	Second round
1989–90	2	2ª	16th	First round
1990–91	2	2ª	10th	Third round
1991–92	2	2ª	12th	Fourth round
1992–93	2	2ª	16th	Third round
1993–94	2	2ª	10th	Fifth round
1994–95	2	2ª	5th	Third round
1995–96	2	2ª	12th	Second round
1996–97	2	2ª	5th	Second round
1997–98	2	2ª	10th	Second round
1998–99	2	2ª	18th	First round
1999–2000	2	2ª	11th	Second round

Season	Tier	Division	Place	Copa del Rey
2000–01	2	2ª	15th	Round of 64
2001–02	2	2ª	8th	Round of 64
2002–03	2	2ª	17th	Round of 32
2003–04	2	2ª	10th	Round of 16
2004–05	2	2ª	4th	Round of 64
2005–06	2	2ª	22nd	Fourth round
2006–07	3	2ª B	1st	Third round
2007–08	2	2ª	13th	Third round
2008–09	2	2ª	21st	Second round
2009–10	3	2ª B	2nd	First round
2010–11	3	2ª B	1st	First round
2011–12	3	2ª B	3rd	Third round
2012–13	3	2ª B	2nd	Round of 16
2013–14	2	2ª	1st	Third round
2014–15	1	1ª	18th*	Round of 32
2015–16	1	1ª	14th	Round of 16
2016–17	1	1ª	10th	Quarterfinals
2017–18	1	1ª	9th	Round of 32
2018–19	1	1ª	12th	Round of 32
2019–20	1	1ª	14th	Round of 32

Season	Tier	Division	Place	Copa del Rey
2020–21	1	1ª	20th	Round of 32
2021–22	2	2ª	3rd	Round of 32
2022–23	2	2ª	5th	Second round
2023–24	2	2ª	3rd	Round of 32
2024–25	2	2ª	9th	First round
2025–26	2	2ª	8th	Round of 32
2026–27	2	2ª		TBD

*Avoided relegation to the second tier after the 2014–15 season due to Elche's administrative relegation because of tax problems.

- 7 seasons in La Liga
- 32 seasons in Segunda División
- 7 seasons in Segunda División B
- 28 seasons in Tercera División
- 13 seasons in Categorías Regionales

== Honours ==
- Segunda División

2013–14 (Note: Promoted directly)

- Segunda División B (Note: Third tier)

1987–88, 2006–07, (Note: Promoted in play-offs) 2010–11 (Note: Not promoted in play-offs)

- Tercera División

1950–51, (Note: Not promoted in play-offs) 1952–53, 1961–62, (Note: Not promoted in play-offs) 1962–63, (Note: Not promoted in play-offs) 1966–67 (Note: Not promoted in play-offs)

- Tercera División (Note: Fourth tier)

1981–82, (Note: Not promoted in play-offs) 1985–86 (Note: Promoted in play-offs)

== Current squad ==
As of 3 September 2026

Note: Flags indicate national team as defined under FIFA eligibility rules; some limited exceptions apply. Players may hold more than one non-FIFA nationality.

No.	Pos.	Nation	Player
1	GK	ESP	Luis López
2	DF	ESP	Sergio Cubero
3	DF	ESP	Imanol García de Albéniz
4	DF	ESP	Unai Elgezabal
5	DF	ESP	Peru Nolaskoain
6	MF	ESP	Sergio Álvarez
7	FW	ESP	Adu Ares
8	MF	ESP	Ander Madariaga
9	FW	ESP	Jon Bautista
10	FW	ESP	Jon Guruzeta
11	FW	ESP	Jon Magunazelaia
13	GK	ESP	Jonmi Magunagoitia
14	MF	ESP	Lander Olaetxea

No.	Pos.	Nation	Player
15	DF	POR	Jair Amador
17	FW	ESP	Pejiño
18	DF	ESP	Markel Arana
19	FW	ESP	Eric Pérez
20	FW	ESP	Javi Martón
21	MF	ESP	Iván Gil
22	DF	ESP	Álvaro Rodríguez
23	DF	ESP	Anaitz Arbilla (captain)
24	DF	ESP	Juan Bernat
27	FW	ESP	Elijah Gift (on loan from Athletic Bilbao)
28	MF	ESP	Lucas Núñez (on loan from Valencia)
30	MF	ESP	Aleix Garrido

=== Reserve team ===
Note: Flags indicate national team as defined under FIFA eligibility rules; some limited exceptions apply. Players may hold more than one non-FIFA nationality.

No.	Pos.	Nation	Player
29	FW	ESP	Iker Zubiría
32	FW	ESP	Carlos Lumbreras

No.	Pos.	Nation	Player
34	DF	ESP	Oier Llorente
36	DF	ESP	Haritz Ortuzar

=== Out on loan ===
Note: Flags indicate national team as defined under FIFA eligibility rules; some limited exceptions apply. Players may hold more than one non-FIFA nationality.

No.	Pos.	Nation	Player
—	DF	ESP	Hodei Arrillaga (at Mirandés until 30 June 2027)
—	FW	ESP	Endika Mateos (at Barakaldo until 30 June 2027)

No.	Pos.	Nation	Player
—	FW	ESP	Hugo García (at Cultural Leonesa until 30 June 2027)

== Stadium ==
Eibar's home stadium is Estadio Municipal de Ipurua, which seats 8,164 spectators.

== Famous players ==
Note: this list includes players that have appeared in at least 100 league games, have reached international status, or both.

- (Argentina) Gonzalo Escalante
- (Belgium) Frederic Peiremans
- (Chile) Fabián Orellana
- (Colombia) Avimiled Rivas
- (Ghana) Derek Boateng
- (Italy) Simone Verdi
- (Japan) Takashi Inui
- (Malaysia) Natxo Insa
- (Peru) Damián Ísmodes
- (Portugal) Paulo Oliveira
- (Russia) Igor Lediakhov
- (Senegal) Pape Diop
- (Serbia) Marko Dmitrović
- (Serbia) Dejan Lekić
- (Spain) Ander Alaña
- (Spain) Xabi Alonso
- (Spain) Sergio Álvarez
- (Spain) Jon Altuna
- (Spain) Txema Añibarro
- (Spain) Mikel Arruabarrena
- (Spain) Eneko Bóveda
- (Spain) Ander Capa
- (Spain) Lluis Codina
- (Spain) Roberto Echevarria
- (Spain) Sergi Enrich
- (Spain) Ciriaco Errasti
- (Spain) Ramón Gabilondo
- (Spain) José Eulogio Gárate
- (Spain) Dani García
- (Spain) Gaizka Garitano
- (Spain) José Garmendia
- (Spain) Agustín Guisasola
- (Spain) Xabi Irureta
- (Spain) Javi Lara
- (Spain) Roberto Lombraña
- (Spain) David Silva
- (Spain) Mikel Oyarzabal
- (Spain) Aitor López Rekarte
- (Spain) Jon Urzelai
- (Spain) Kike Mateo
- (Uruguay) Federico Magallanes
- (Spain) Ivan Ramis

== Club officials ==
=== Current technical staff ===
Position	Staff
Head coach	(Spain) Jokin Aranbarri
Assistant head coach	(Spain) Mikel Balenziaga
Goalkeeping coach	(Spain) Jon Zabala
Fitness coach	(Spain) Carlos de Blasis
Analyst	(Spain) Andoni Azkargorta
Physiotherapist	(Spain) Manu Sánchez (Spain) Ander Raso (Spain) Joseba Perosanz
Nutritionist	(Spain) Amaia Fernández
Rehab fitness coach	(Spain) Mikel Calvo
Chief of medical services	(Spain) Honorio Martínez
Equipment manager	(Spain) Ibai Díez (Spain) Julen Bermejo
Field delegate	(Spain) Germán Andueza
Team delegate	(Ecuador) Iosu Echevarria

Last updated: 11 August 2026
Source: SD Eibar (in Spanish)

=== Board of directors ===
Office	Name
President	Amaia Gorostiza
Vice president	Joseba Unamuno
Secretary	Jon Ander Ulazia
Directors	Virginia Arakistain
Directors	Leire Barriuso
Directors	J. A. Fernández
Directors	Javier Gurrutxaga
Directors	Agustín Lahidalga
Directors	Antón Martinena
Directors	Alex Martínez
Directors	Javier Sarrionandia

Last updated: 9 April 2019
Source: SD Eibar

== Coaches ==
- (Spain) Antonio Corral Artayer (1953–58)
- (Spain) Luis Ciaurriz Ustarroz (1971–73)
- (Spain) Juan Arriarán Aramburu (1974–75)
- (Spain) Jesús María Sagasti Zorroza (1982–83)
- (Spain) Alfonso Barasoain (1988–90)
- (Spain) Mikel Etxarri Sasiain (1990–92)
- (Spain) José Mendiluce Loyola (1992)
- (Spain) José Gallastegui Otaduy (1992–93)
- (Spain) José María Araquistain (1993–95)
- (Spain) Miguel Ángel Alonso (1995–98)
- (Spain) Enrique Ormaetxea Axpe (1998)
- (Spain) José Gallastegui Otaduy (1998)
- (Spain) Alfonso Barasoain (1998–99)
- (Spain) Blas Ziarreta (1999–03)
- (Spain) José María Amorrortu (2003–04)
- (Spain) José Luis Ribera (2004)
- (Spain) José Luis Mendilibar (2004–05)
- (Spain) Carlos Terrazas (2005)
- (Spain) Roberto Olabe (2006)
- (Spain) Manix Mandiola (2006–08)
- (Spain) Carlos Pouso (2008–09)
- (Spain) Josu Uribe (2009)
- (Spain) Ángel Viadero (2009–10)
- (Spain) Manix Mandiola (2010–12)
- (Spain) Gaizka Garitano (2012–15)
- (Spain) José Luis Mendilibar (2015–21)
- (Spain) Gaizka Garitano (2021–23)
- (Spain) Joseba Etxeberria (2023–25)
- (Spain) Beñat San José (2025–)

== Presidents ==
1940–46	Juan Artamendi
1946–48	Bernardino Odriozola
1948–49	Crispin Garate
1949–57	Manolo Escodin
1957–58	Boni Guisasola
1958–59	Tomas Echaluce
1959–61	Manolo Zubia
1961–62	Pedro Irusta
1962–65	Luis María Fernández de Betoño
1965–67	Luis María Aranegui
1967–68	Roberto Cadenas
1968–74	José González Ortiz de Zárate
1974–77	Eusebio Oyarzun
1977–84	Paco Marquiegui
1984–88	Javier Arrieta
1988–2002	Juan Luis Mardaras
2002–09	Jaime Barriuso
2009–16	Alex Aranzábal
2016–	Amaia Gorostiza

== See also ==
- CD Vitoria, Eibar's reserve team.
- SD Eibar (women), Eibar's women's team
