= Ángel Viadero =

Spanish football coach (born 1969)

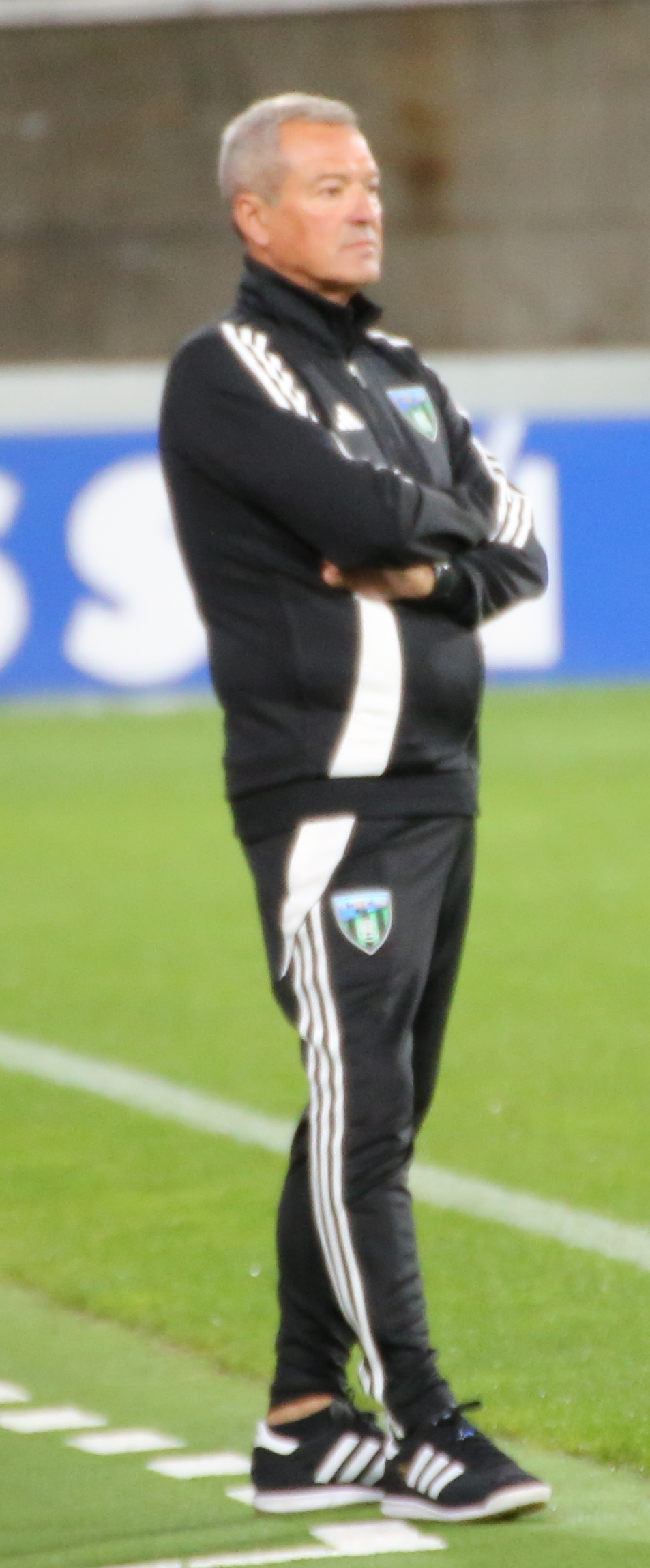
- Viadero in 2024

Personal information
- Full name: Ángel Eduardo Viadero Odriozola
- Date of birth: 3 January 1969 (age 57)
- Place of birth: Santander, Spain

Team information
- Current team: Goa (head coach)

Managerial career
- Years: Team
- 2002–2008: Racing B
- 2008–2009: Ponferradina
- 2009–2010: Eibar
- 2010: Pontevedra
- 2011–2013: Noja
- 2013–2015: Sestao
- 2015–2016: Burgos
- 2016–2018: Racing Santander
- 2019–2020: Moghreb Tétouan
- 2021: Melilla
- 2023–2024: Lleida Esportiu
- 2024–2025: Sestao
- 2026–: Goa

Ángel Eduardo Viadero Odriozola (born 3 January 1969) is a Spanish football coach, who is currently the head coach of Indian Super League club Goa.

He spent the great majority of his career managing in Segunda División B, leading both Racing Santander and their reserves in the league.

== Career ==
Viadero was born in Santander, Cantabria. He began his managerial career in the reserve team of hometown club Racing de Santander, twice being relegated from Segunda División B but both times winning promotion instantly back from Tercera División. In June 2008, he switched to SD Ponferradina on a one-year contract, also in the third division.

In February 2009, Viadero was dismissed from Ponfe, despite the side sitting in third and therefore in the promotion play-off places. He returned to work in July at SD Eibar, but was replaced by the returning Manix Mandiola in late April 2010. Weeks later he was confirmed at Pontevedra CF for the new season, losing seven of his first ten matches and his job in October.

After taking SD Noja to promotion and then consolidation in the third tier, Viadero joined Sestao River Club in June 2013. In his first season in the Basque Country, the side won their group but were eliminated 3–2 on aggregate by Gimnàstic de Tarragona in the play-off semi-finals. Following two full campaigns at the club and Burgos CF, he withdrew from his two contracted years at the latter and returned to Racing, being named manager of their first team, now in division three.

Days after being denied a first career promotion to Segunda División via a 4–1 play-off final loss to FC Barcelona B, Viadero was given a second year in the hotseat at the Estadio El Sardinero on 30 June 2017. The following 4 February he was sacked, with fans turning against him as they trailed leaders Sporting de Gijón B by eight points.

On 12 August 2019, Viadero accepted his first foreign job, taking the reins at Moroccan Botola club Moghreb Tétouan for the upcoming season. He lost his job the following 28 February after a seven-game winless run for the 8th-placed club.

Remaining in North Africa, Viadero was hired at third-tier Spanish club UD Melilla on 13 January 2021. He signed to the end of the season.

On 3 February 2023, after more than a year without a club, Viadero was named manager at Lleida Esportiu until the end of the season. He succeeded Toni Seligrat, who departed to become assistant coach at La Liga side Valencia CF.

== Managerial statistics ==
As of 21 November 2026

Managerial record by team and tenure
Team	Nat	From	To	Record								Ref
Team	Nat	From	To	G	W	D	L	GF	GA	GD	Win %	Ref
Racing B	(Spain)	30 June 2002	2 July 2008	254	114	64	76	406	285	+121	44.88	
Ponferradina	(Spain)	2 July 2008	23 February 2009	31	16	6	9	44	36	+8	51.61	
Eibar	(Spain)	1 July 2009	27 April 2010	37	17	10	10	42	35	+7	45.95	
Pontevedra	(Spain)	23 June 2010	19 October 2010	10	2	1	7	9	15	−6	20.00	
Noja	(Spain)	22 June 2011	4 June 2013	83	44	15	24	155	85	+70	53.01	
Sestao	(Spain)	4 June 2013	9 June 2015	81	34	22	25	114	101	+13	41.98	
Burgos	(Spain)	9 June 2015	24 June 2016	38	15	13	10	47	39	+8	39.47	
Racing Santander	(Spain)	24 June 2016	4 February 2018	73	44	14	15	108	53	+55	60.27	
Moghreb Tétouan	(Morocco)	1 August 2019	27 February 2020	21	7	8	6	21	18	+3	33.33	
Melilla	(Spain)	13 January 2021	15 June 2021	17	6	8	3	20	17	+3	35.29	
Lleida Esportiu	(Spain)	3 February 2023	6 June 2024	54	27	9	18	63	45	+18	50.00	
Sestao	(Spain)	21 June 2024	4 March 2025	31	10	9	12	26	29	−3	32.26	
Goa	(India)	16 November 2026	Present	1	1	0	0	1	0	+1	100.00	
Career total				731	337	179	215	1,056	758	+298	46.10	—

== Honours ==
=== Manager ===
Racing B

- Tercera División: 2004–05
- Tercera División play-off winner: 2007–08

Noja

- Tercera División: 2011–12
