= Manix Mandiola =

Spanish footballer & coach (born 1958)

Personal information
- Full name: Javier Mandiola Alberdi
- Date of birth: 9 April 1958 (age 68)
- Place of birth: Eibar, Spain
- Position: Forward

Youth career
- Eibar

Senior career*
Years	Team	Apps	(Gls)
- Eibar
1980–1982	San Sebastián	62	(5)
1982–1983	Burgos	31	(2)
1983–1985	Real Unión		
1985–1986	Sestao	48	(15)

Managerial career
- 2000–2003: Eibar B
- 2003–2004: Beasain
- 2004–2005: Real Unión
- 2006–2008: Eibar
- 2008–2009: Alavés
- 2010–2012: Eibar
- 2013–2016: Tudelano
- 2016–2017: Burgos
- 2018–2020: Atlético Baleares
- 2020–2021: Numancia
- 2022: Olot
- * Club domestic league appearances and goals

Javier 'Manix' Mandiola Alberdi (born 9 April 1958) is a Spanish retired professional footballer who played as a forward, and is a current coach.

His managerial career of over two decades was spent almost entirely in Segunda División B, though he also managed in Segunda División with Eibar and Alavés.

== Playing career ==
Born in Eibar, Gipuzkoa, Mandiola finished his graduation with SD Eibar, but only appeared notably with Sestao River Club in the 1985–86 season, playing for the Basque side in Segunda División.

== Manager career ==
After hanging up his boots Mandiola was a manager of SD Eibar B. In 2003, he joined SD Beasain in Tercera División. After a season, Mandiola was appointed Real Unión manager, and despite finishing second in his first season, he was dismissed in his second due to poor results.

In 2006, Mandiola was appointed Eibar manager, and achieved promotion from the third level at first attempt. He managed to lead the club to a mid-table finish in their return to the second division, but was relieved to his duties nonetheless.

On 23 December 2008 Mandiola was appointed Deportivo Alavés manager. He was sacked only less than two months later.

On 27 April 2010 Mandiola returned to Eibar, with the club back to the third division; he was relieved from his duties in the end of the 2011–12 season, after missing the promotion in both play-offs.

On 28 December 2013 Mandiola was appointed CD Tudelano manager. He announced his departure from the club on 6 May 2016, and was appointed at the helm of Burgos CF on 27 September. He was sacked on 25 April 2017.

Mandiola was appointed by CD Atlético Baleares in February 2018, on a deal until the end of the season. In his first full season in Palma de Mallorca, the team won their Segunda B group and lost the play-off final to CD Mirandés on the away goals rule after a 3–3 aggregate draw.

On 28 August 2020, Mandiola replaced Luis Carrión at the helm of CD Numancia, recently relegated to division three. He was himself dismissed the following 17 January, after four wins in 11 matches overall.

== Managerial statistics ==
As of 6 November 2022

Managerial record by team and tenure
Team	Nat	From	To	Record								Ref
Team	Nat	From	To	G	W	D	L	GF	GA	GD	Win %	Ref
Eibar B	(Spain)	30 June 2000	1 July 2003	114	32	33	49	102	128	−26	28.07	
Beasain	(Spain)	1 July 2003	30 June 2004	38	18	11	9	42	35	+7	47.37	
Real Unión	(Spain)	30 June 2004	11 December 2005	60	28	19	13	73	46	+27	46.67	
Eibar	(Spain)	1 July 2006	17 June 2008	88	39	20	29	101	81	+20	44.32	
Alavés	(Spain)	23 December 2008	8 February 2009	6	1	1	4	4	10	−6	16.67	
Eibar	(Spain)	27 April 2010	31 May 2012	92	43	31	18	118	75	+43	46.74	
Tudelano	(Spain)	28 December 2013	30 June 2016	99	45	28	26	120	78	+42	45.45	
Burgos	(Spain)	27 September 2016	25 April 2017	33	11	10	12	36	40	−4	33.33	
Atlético Baleares	(Spain)	5 February 2018	24 July 2020	89	47	24	18	114	68	+46	52.81	
Numancia	(Spain)	28 August 2020	17 January 2021	11	4	3	4	12	9	+3	36.36	
Olot	(Spain)	30 March 2022	9 November 2022	17	7	4	6	14	15	−1	41.18	
Total				647	275	184	188	736	585	+151	42.50	—
