= Javier Álvarez de los Mozos =

Spanish football manager (born 1976)

Personal information
- Full name: Javier Álvarez de los Mozos
- Date of birth: 9 February 1976 (age 50)
- Place of birth: Burgos, Spain

Managerial career
- Years: Team
- Vadillos (youth)
- 1998–2000: Racing Lermeño
- 2000–2004: Burgos (assistant)
- 2004: Burgos (interim)
- 2005–2006: Móstoles
- 2006–2007: Norma San Leonardo
- 2007–2008: Mérida (assistant)
- 2008–2010: Burgos
- 2012: Bupolsa
- 2013: Villaralbo
- 2014: Cristo Atlético
- 2014–2017: Mirandés (assistant)
- 2016: Mirandés (interim)
- 2017: Mirandés
- 2017–2019: Arandina
- 2020–2021: Villanovense
- 2021–2022: Mérida

Javier Álvarez de los Mozos (born 9 February 1976) is a Spanish football manager.

His career was spent almost completely in the lower leagues, with 11 games in Segunda División at Mirandés in early 2017.

== Career ==
Born in Burgos, Castile and León, de los Mozos started his managerial career at Vadillos CF's youth setup. In 1998, aged only 22, he was appointed manager of Tercera División side Racing Lermeño.

In 2000, de los Mozos moved to hometown club Burgos CF, as Carlos Terrazas' assistant. He remained in the role in the following years, working with Enrique Martín and again with Terrazas before leaving in 2004.

In December 2005, de los Mozos was named CD Móstoles manager, but was sacked the following 27 April. He subsequently had spells at CF Norma San Leonardo and Mérida UD, the latter as Fabri's assistant, before returning to Burgos in July 2008 now as a head coach.

In 2010 de los Mozos resigned, and later rejected offers from CD Aguilar and CD Guijuelo. On 9 February 2012 he returned to coaching with CD Bupolsa, Burgos' reserve team, but stepped down in August.

On 7 March 2013 de los Mozos was appointed at GCE Villaralbo, remaining in charge until the end of the campaign, which ended in relegation. He only returned to action the following 23 January with CD Cristo Atlético, but resigned due to "personal reasons" on 30 March.

On 19 June 2014 de los Mozos was named CD Mirandés assistant manager, joining Terrazas for a third time. On 1 December 2016, after the latter's dismissal, he was named interim manager in Segunda División. Two days later he appeared in his first professional match, a 1–0 home win against Elche CF.

After the appointment of Claudio Barragán de los Mozos returned to his previous duties, but after the latter's dismissal on 18 January 2017, he was again named manager. On 28 March, after only one win in ten matches, he was relieved from his duties. In December, he was appointed manager of Arandina CF in the fourth division, leaving by mutual agreement in July 2019.

On 13 January 2020, de los Mozos was appointed at the helm of CF Villanovense, still in the fourth tier. The team were first-placed in their group when the season was ended by the COVID-19 pandemic, and then were promoted via the playoffs at the expense of CP Cacereño. He left in May 2021, with the team demoted to the new fourth-tier Segunda Federación after a league restructuring.

Remaining in the Province of Badajoz, de los Mozos was hired on 28 November 2021 at Mérida AD, who had started their season in the same division with poor home form. He left for personal reasons after four games, despite his last fixture yielding his only points, a 2–0 home win over UD Las Palmas Atlético on 9 January.

== Managerial statistics ==
As of 9 January 2021

Managerial record by team and tenure
Team	Nat	From	To	Record					Ref
Team	Nat	From	To	G	W	D	L	Win %	Ref
Racing Lermeño	(Spain)	1 July 1998	30 June 2000	76	34	19	23	44.74	
Burgos (interim)	(Spain)	12 April 2004	30 June 2004	5	2	1	2	40.00	
Móstoles	(Spain)	12 December 2005	27 April 2006	17	3	7	7	17.65	
Norma San Leonardo	(Spain)	30 June 2006	1 July 2007	38	16	12	10	42.11	
Burgos	(Spain)	25 July 2008	7 June 2010	90	53	28	9	58.89	
Bupolsa	(Spain)	9 February 2012	17 August 2012	15	4	5	6	26.67	
Villaralbo	(Spain)	7 March 2013	30 June 2013	11	4	1	6	36.36	
Cristo Atlético	(Spain)	23 January 2014	30 March 2014	10	5	0	5	50.00	
Mirandés (interim)	(Spain)	1 December 2016	7 December 2016	1	1	0	0	100.00	
Mirandés	(Spain)	18 January 2017	28 March 2017	10	1	4	5	10.00	
Arandina	(Spain)	27 December 2017	12 July 2019	67	43	15	9	64.18	
Villanovense	(Spain)	13 January 2020	11 May 2021	35	18	7	10	51.43	
Mérida	(Spain)	28 November 2021	11 January 2022	4	1	0	3	25.00	
Total				379	185	99	95	48.81	—
