= Carlos Terrazas =

Spanish football manager (born 1962)

Personal information
- Full name: Carlos Terrazas Sánchez
- Date of birth: 9 February 1962 (age 64)
- Place of birth: Bilbao, Spain

Team information
- Current team: Hogar Alcarreño (manager)

Managerial career
- Years: Team
- 1994–1995: Santurtzi
- 1995–1996: Zalla
- 1997–1999: Bilbao Athletic
- 1999–2000: Gimnástica
- 2000–2001: Burgos
- 2001–2002: Bilbao Athletic
- 2002–2004: Burgos
- 2004–2005: Ceuta
- 2005: Eibar
- 2007–2009: Jaén
- 2010–2013: Guadalajara
- 2013–2016: Mirandés
- 2017–2018: Ponferradina
- 2019–: Hogar Alcarreño

Carlos Terrazas Sánchez (born 9 February 1962) is a Spanish football manager. He is the current owner, general manager and head coach of AD Hogar Alcarreño.

His career of over a quarter of a century was spent mostly in the Segunda División B, although he also coached Eibar, Guadalajara and Mirandés in the Segunda División.

== Career ==
Born in Bilbao, Biscay, Terrazas began his managerial career at local CD Santurtzi, and subsequently worked with neighbouring Bilbao Athletic in Segunda División B. Following spells with Gimnástica de Torrelavega, Burgos CF, Bilbao Athletic and AD Ceuta, he was appointed at the helm of Segunda División club SD Eibar in June 2005.

Terrazas was dismissed on 23 December 2005 due to poor results. In the summer of 2007, he moved to Real Jaén of the third division.

On 27 August 2009, Terrazas resigned from the Andalusians' bench alleging personal problems. In September 2010 he moved to CD Guadalajara, replacing the fired Kike Liñero. He achieved promotion to the second tier at the first attempt, and narrowly avoided relegation the next season, being appointed general manager in the process.

On 1 August 2013, after the Castilla-La Mancha side's administrative relegation, Terrazas announced his resignment. He joined fellow second-division side CD Mirandés on 17 December, taking over from Gonzalo Arconada.

Terrazas remained in charge for the following campaigns, achieving an eighth place in 2014–15, the club's best-ever position. On 1 December 2016, he was relieved of his duties.

In 2017–18, Terrazas led SD Ponferradina for the whole season, also serving as sporting director. Though the aim was the play-offs, the team fought relegation and only avoided relegation in the penultimate game, finishing 12th; he did not renew his contract.

== Managerial statistics ==
As of 13 May 2018

Managerial record by team and tenure
Team	Nat	From	To	Record								Ref
Team	Nat	From	To	G	W	D	L	GF	GA	GD	Win %	Ref
Santurtzi	(Spain)	1 July 1994	29 June 1995	38	12	12	14	32	31	+1	31.58	
Zalla	(Spain)	29 June 1995	1 July 1996	44	26	14	4	53	16	+37	59.09	
Bilbao Athletic	(Spain)	30 January 1997	30 May 1999	98	48	22	28	129	91	+38	48.98	
Gimnástica	(Spain)	30 May 1999	1 July 2000	44	25	12	7	68	26	+42	56.82	
Burgos	(Spain)	1 July 2000	30 June 2001	47	27	13	7	64	25	+39	57.45	
Bilbao Athletic	(Spain)	30 June 2001	12 June 2002	38	14	14	10	47	34	+13	36.84	
Burgos	(Spain)	12 June 2002	12 April 2004	80	32	29	19	89	66	+23	40.00	
Ceuta	(Spain)	1 July 2004	24 June 2005	43	18	15	10	41	27	+14	41.86	
Eibar	(Spain)	24 June 2005	23 December 2005	22	6	9	7	17	20	−3	27.27	
Jaén	(Spain)	2 November 2007	27 August 2009	83	43	24	16	98	49	+49	51.81	
Guadalajara	(Spain)	29 September 2010	1 August 2013	124	48	30	46	164	159	+5	38.71	
Mirandés	(Spain)	17 December 2013	1 December 2016	135	45	40	50	152	170	−18	33.33	
Ponferradina	(Spain)	27 May 2017	15 May 2018	43	16	12	15	58	53	+5	37.21	
Total				839	360	246	233	1,012	767	+245	42.91	—
