= 2000–01 UEFA Cup first round =

The first round of the 2000–01 UEFA Cup began on 14 September 2000. The round included 41 winners from the qualifying round, 16 losing teams from the Champions League 3rd qualifying round, 3 winners of the Intertoto Cup and 36 new entrants. This round narrowed the clubs from 96 to 48 teams for the second round.

== Teams ==
The following 96 teams participated in the first round.

Key to colours
Winners of first round advanced to second round

First round participants

| Team | Notes | Coeff. |
|---|---|---|
| (Italy) Internazionale | | 79.964 |
| (Italy) Parma | | 78.964 |
| (Netherlands) Ajax | | 75.333 |
| (England) Chelsea | | 69.727 |
| (Italy) Roma | | 65.964 |
| (France) Bordeaux | | 64.364 |
| (Portugal) Porto | | 61.275 |
| (Netherlands) Feyenoord | | 60.333 |
| (Italy) Fiorentina | | 57.964 |
| (Czech Republic) Slavia Prague | | 56.562 |
| (Spain) Celta Vigo | | 53.799 |
| (England) Liverpool | | 49.728 |
| (Russia) Lokomotiv Moscow | | 48.638 |
| (France) Nantes | | 46.364 |
| (Germany) 1. FC Kaiserslautern | | 46.201 |
| (Italy) Udinese | | 43.964 |
| (Greece) AEK Athens | | 43.433 |
| (Germany) Werder Bremen | | 43.201 |
| (Portugal) Benfica | | 42.275 |
| (Germany) VfB Stuttgart | | 42.201 |
| (Spain) Zaragoza | | 39.799 |
| (Netherlands) Roda JC | | 36.333 |
| (Spain) Espanyol | | 34.799 |
| (Austria) Rapid Wien | | 34.250 |

| Team | Notes | Coeff. |
|---|---|---|
| (Denmark) Brøndby | | 34.088 |
| (Belgium) Club Brugge | | 32.525 |
| (Germany) Hertha BSC | | 32.201 |
| (Spain) Rayo Vallecano | | 29.799 |
| (Spain) Alavés | | 29.799 |
| (Germany) 1860 Munich | | 29.201 |
| (Netherlands) Vitesse | | 27.333 |
| (Croatia) Dinamo Zagreb | | 26.062 |
| (Scotland) Celtic | | 25.250 |
| (Russia) Dynamo Moscow | | 24.638 |
| (Greece) PAOK | | 24.433 |
| (Switzerland) Zürich | | 22.500 |
| (Portugal) Boavista | | 22.275 |
| (Austria) GAK | | 22.250 |
| (France) Gueugnon | | 21.364 |
| (England) Leicester City | | 20.728 |
| (Norway) Brann | | 20.050 |
| (Russia) Alania Vladikavkaz | | 18.638 |
| (Greece) OFI | | 18.433 |
| (Sweden) AIK | | 17.766 |
| (Hungary) MTK Hungária | | 17.708 |
| (Russia) Torpedo Moscow | | 15.637 |
| (Russia) CSKA Moscow | | 15.637 |
| (Czech Republic) Slovan Liberec | | 14.562 |

| Team | Notes | Coeff. |
|---|---|---|
| (Czech Republic) Drnovice | | 14.562 |
| (Belgium) Genk | | 14.525 |
| (Switzerland) Lausanne-Sports | | 14.500 |
| (Greece) Iraklis | | 14.433 |
| (Norway) Lillestrøm | | 14.050 |
| (Norway) Molde | | 14.050 |
| (Poland) Wisła Kraków | | 14.000 |
| (Israel) Maccabi Haifa | | 13.771 |
| (Sweden) Halmstads BK | | 13.767 |
| (Romania) Rapid București | | 12.917 |
| (Federal Republic of Yugoslavia) Red Star Belgrade | | 12.708 |
| (Turkey) Gaziantepspor | | 11.925 |
| (Turkey) Antalyaspor | | 11.925 |
| (Ukraine) Vorskla Poltava | | 11.583 |
| (Ukraine) Kryvbas Kryvyi Rih | | 11.583 |
| (Belgium) Lierse | | 11.525 |
| (Scotland) Heart of Midlothian | | 11.250 |
| (Austria) Tirol Innsbruck | | 11.250 |
| (Poland) Amica Wronki | | 11.000 |
| (Switzerland) St. Gallen | | 10.500 |
| (Switzerland) Basel | | 10.500 |
| (Slovakia) Inter Slovnaft Bratislava | | 10.416 |
| (Denmark) AB | | 10.087 |
| (Poland) Ruch Chorzów | | 10.000 |

| Team | Notes | Coeff. |
|---|---|---|
| (Slovenia) Olimpija Ljubljana | | 9.916 |
| (Israel) Beitar Jerusalem | | 9.771 |
| (Belgium) Gent | | 9.525 |
| (Denmark) Viborg | | 9.087 |
| (Denmark) Herfølge | | 9.087 |
| (Finland) HJK | | 9.021 |
| (Poland) Polonia Warsaw | | 9.000 |
| (Federal Republic of Yugoslavia) Partizan | | 8.708 |
| (Slovakia) Slovan Bratislava | | 8.416 |
| (Bulgaria) CSKA Sofia | | 8.270 |
| (Moldova) Zimbru Chișinău | | 8.167 |
| (Croatia) Rijeka | | 8.062 |
| (Croatia) Osijek | | 8.062 |
| (Sweden) IFK Norrköping | | 7.766 |
| (Sweden) Örgryte IS | | 7.766 |
| (Cyprus) APOEL | | 7.749 |
| (Hungary) Dunaferr | | 7.708 |
| (Hungary) Vasas | | 7.708 |
| (Slovakia) Košice | | 7.416 |
| (Slovenia) HIT Gorica | | 5.916 |
| (Federal Republic of Yugoslavia) Napredak Kruševac | | 5.707 |
| (Bulgaria) Neftochimic Burgas | | 5.270 |
| (North Macedonia) Pobeda | | 2.540 |
| (Republic of Ireland) Bohemians | | 0.832 |

Notes

1. ^{QR} Winners from the qualifying round
2. ^{CL} Losers from the Champions League third qualifying round
3. ^{IC} Teams qualified via the Intertoto Cup

== Seeding ==
UEFA allocated the teams into six groups, each with eight seeded and eight unseeded teams.

| Group 1 | | Group 2 | | Group 3 | |
| Seeded | Unseeded | Seeded | Unseeded | Seeded | Unseeded |
|---|---|---|---|---|---|
| (Italy) Internazionale; (England) Liverpool; (Russia) Lokomotiv Moscow; (Spain) Espanyol; (Denmark) Brøndby; (Switzerland) Zürich; (Portugal) Boavista; (Czech Republic) Slovan Liberec | (Belgium) Genk; (Romania) Rapid București; (Ukraine) Vorskla Poltava; (Poland) Ruch Chorzów; (Slovenia) Olimpija Ljubljana; (Croatia) Osijek; (Sweden) IFK Norrköping; (Bulgaria) Neftochimic Burgas | (Italy) Parma; (Spain) Celta Vigo; (France) Nantes; (Netherlands) Roda JC; (Germany) Hertha BSC; (Greece) PAOK; (England) Leicester City; (Russia) Torpedo Moscow | (Switzerland) Lausanne-Sports; (Federal Republic of Yugoslavia) Red Star Belgrade; (Ukraine) Kryvbas Kryvyi Rih; (Slovakia) Inter Slovnaft Bratislava; (Israel) Beitar Jerusalem; (Moldova) Zimbru Chișinău; (Croatia) Rijeka; (North Macedonia) Pobeda | (Netherlands) Ajax; (Czech Republic) Slavia Prague; (Germany) Werder Bremen; (Austria) Rapid Wien; (Spain) Alavés; (Russia) Dynamo Moscow; (Austria) GAK; (Hungary) MTK Hungária | (Norway) Lillestrøm; (Turkey) Gaziantepspor; (Turkey) Antalyaspor; (Denmark) AB; (Belgium) Gent; (Bulgaria) CSKA Sofia; (Sweden) Örgryte IS; (Slovakia) Košice |
| Group 4 | | Group 5 | | Group 6 | |
| Seeded | Unseeded | Seeded | Unseeded | Seeded | Unseeded |
| (England) Chelsea; (Italy) Fiorentina; (Germany) 1. FC Kaiserslautern; (Spain) Zaragoza; (Belgium) Club Brugge; (Scotland) Celtic; (France) Gueugnon; (Russia) CSKA Moscow | (Greece) Iraklis; (Poland) Wisła Kraków; (Austria) Tirol Innsbruck; (Switzerland) St. Gallen; (Denmark) Viborg; (Finland) HJK; (Cyprus) APOEL; (Republic of Ireland) Bohemians | (Italy) Roma; (Portugal) Porto; (Greece) AEK Athens; (Germany) VfB Stuttgart; (Spain) Rayo Vallecano; (Netherlands) Vitesse; (Russia) Alania Vladikavkaz; (Sweden) AIK | (Norway) Molde; (Israel) Maccabi Haifa; (Scotland) Heart of Midlothian; (Poland) Amica Wronki; (Denmark) Herfølge; (Federal Republic of Yugoslavia) Partizan; (Hungary) Vasas; (Slovenia) HIT Gorica | (France) Bordeaux; (Netherlands) Feyenoord; (Italy) Udinese; (Portugal) Benfica; (Germany) 1860 Munich; (Croatia) Dinamo Zagreb; (Norway) Brann; (Greece) OFI | (Czech Republic) Drnovice; (Sweden) Halmstads BK; (Belgium) Lierse; (Switzerland) Basel; (Poland) Polonia Warsaw; (Slovakia) Slovan Bratislava; (Hungary) Dunaferr; (Federal Republic of Yugoslavia) Napredak Kruševac |

== Summary ==
| Team 1 | Agg. | Team 2 | 1st leg | 2nd leg |
|---|---|---|---|---|
| Zimbru Chișinău (Moldova) | 1–4 | (Germany) Hertha BSC | 1–2 | 0–2 |
| Antalyaspor (Turkey) | 2–6 | (Germany) Werder Bremen | 2–0 | 0–6 |
| Bohemians (Republic of Ireland) | 2–3 | (Germany) 1. FC Kaiserslautern | 1–3 | 1–0 |
| VfB Stuttgart (Germany) | 3–3 (a) | (Scotland) Heart of Midlothian | 1–0 | 2–3 |
| Drnovice (Czech Republic) | 0–1 | (Germany) 1860 Munich | 0–0 | 0–1 |
| Lokomotiv Moscow (Russia) | 4–2 | (Bulgaria) Neftochimic Burgas | 4–2 | 0–0 |
| IFK Norrköping (Sweden) | 3–4 | (Czech Republic) Slovan Liberec | 2–2 | 1–2 |
| Rapid București (Romania) | 0–1 | (England) Liverpool | 0–1 | 0–0 |
| Zürich (Switzerland) | 1–4 | (Belgium) Genk | 1–2 | 0–2 |
| Olimpija Ljubljana (Slovenia) | 2–3 | (Spain) Espanyol | 2–1 | 0–2 |
| Vorskla Poltava (Ukraine) | 2–4 | (Portugal) Boavista | 1–2 | 1–2 |
| Brøndby (Denmark) | 1–2 | (Croatia) Osijek | 1–2 | 0–0 |
| Ruch Chorzów (Poland) | 1–7 | (Italy) Internazionale | 0–3 | 1–4 |
| Pobeda (North Macedonia) | 0–6 | (Italy) Parma | 0–2 | 0–4 |
| Lausanne-Sports (Switzerland) | 5–2 | (Russia) Torpedo Moscow | 3–2 | 2–0 |
| Celta Vigo (Spain) | 1–0 | (Croatia) Rijeka | 0–0 | 1–0 (a.e.t.) |
| Leicester City (England) | 2–4 | (Federal Republic of Yugoslavia) Red Star Belgrade | 1–1 | 1–3 |
| Roda JC (Netherlands) | 1–4 | (Slovakia) Inter Slovnaft Bratislava | 0–2 | 1–2 |
| Kryvbas Kryvyi Rih (Ukraine) | 0–6 | (France) Nantes | 0–1 | 0–5 |
| PAOK (Greece) | 6–4 | (Israel) Beitar Jerusalem | 3–1 | 3–3 |
| Slavia Prague (Czech Republic) | 5–0 | (Denmark) AB | 3–0 | 2–0 |
| Rapid Wien (Austria) | 4–1 | (Sweden) Örgryte IS | 3–0 | 1–1 |
| Gent (Belgium) | 0–9 | (Netherlands) Ajax | 0–6 | 0–3 |
| Lillestrøm (Norway) | 4–3 | (Russia) Dynamo Moscow | 3–1 | 1–2 |
| Košice (Slovakia) | 2–3 | (Austria) GAK | 2–3 | 0–0 |
| CSKA Sofia (Bulgaria) | 2–2 (a) | (Hungary) MTK Hungária | 1–2 | 1–0 |
| Alavés (Spain) | 4–3 | (Turkey) Gaziantepspor | 0–0 | 4–3 |
| Tirol Innsbruck (Austria) | 5–3 | (Italy) Fiorentina | 3–1 | 2–2 |
| Club Brugge (Belgium) | 3–0 | (Cyprus) APOEL | 2–0 | 1–0 |
| CSKA Moscow (Russia) | 0–1 | (Denmark) Viborg | 0–0 | 0–1 (a.e.t.) |
| Celtic (Scotland) | 3–2 | (Finland) HJK | 2–0 | 1–2 (a.e.t.) |
| Gueugnon (France) | 0–1 | (Greece) Iraklis | 0–0 | 0–1 |
| Chelsea (England) | 1–2 | (Switzerland) St. Gallen | 1–0 | 0–2 |
| Zaragoza (Spain) | 5–5 (3–4 p) | (Poland) Wisła Kraków | 4–1 | 1–4 (a.e.t.) |
| Molde (Norway) | 1–2 | (Spain) Rayo Vallecano | 0–1 | 1–1 |
| HIT Gorica (Slovenia) | 1–11 | (Italy) Roma | 1–4 | 0–7 |
| AIK (Sweden) | 1–2 | (Denmark) Herfølge | 0–1 | 1–1 (a.e.t.) |
| Vitesse (Netherlands) | 4–2 | (Israel) Maccabi Haifa | 3–0 | 1–2 |
| Vasas (Hungary) | 2–4 | (Greece) AEK Athens | 2–2 | 0–2 |
| Partizan (Federal Republic of Yugoslavia) | 1–2 | (Portugal) Porto | 1–1 | 0–1 |
| Alania Vladikavkaz (Russia) | 0–5 | (Poland) Amica Wronki | 0–3 | 0–2 |
| Halmstads BK (Sweden) | 4–3 | (Portugal) Benfica | 2–1 | 2–2 |
| Dunaferr (Hungary) | 1–4 | (Netherlands) Feyenoord | 0–1 | 1–3 |
| Lierse (Belgium) | 1–5 | (France) Bordeaux | 0–0 | 1–5 |
| Polonia Warsaw (Poland) | 0–3 | (Italy) Udinese | 0–1 | 0–2 |
| Basel (Switzerland) | 7–6 | (Norway) Brann | 3–2 | 4–4 |
| Napredak Kruševac (Federal Republic of Yugoslavia) | 0–6 | (Greece) OFI | 0–0 | 0–6 |
| Slovan Bratislava (Slovakia) | 1–4 | (Croatia) Dinamo Zagreb | 0–3 | 1–1 |

== Matches ==
14 September 2000
16:00

| Zimbru Chișinău (Moldova) | 1–2 | (Germany) Hertha BSC |
|---|---|---|
| Epureanu 1' | Report | Preetz 11'; Daei 64' |

Stadionul Republican, Chişinău
Attendance: 4,800
Referee: Mike Riley (England)
21 September 2000
18:00

| Hertha BSC (Germany) | 2–0 | (Moldova) Zimbru Chișinău |
|---|---|---|
| Hartmann 23'; Daei 26' | Report |

Olympiastadion, Berlin
Attendance: 23,618
Referee: Ivan Dobrinov (Bulgaria)

Hertha BSC won 4–1 on aggregate.

14 September 2000
18:15

| Antalyaspor (Turkey) | 2–0 | (Germany) Werder Bremen |
|---|---|---|
| Gaudino 43'; Birlik 67' | Report |

Atatürk Stadium, Antalya
Attendance: 3,300
Referee: Mario van der Ende (Netherlands)
28 September 2000
19:45

| Werder Bremen (Germany) | 6–0 | (Turkey) Antalyaspor |
|---|---|---|
| Wicky 8'; Bode 41'; Stalteri 51'; Aílton 55', 58', 65' | Report |

Weserstadion, Bremen
Attendance: 25,600
Referee: Sergey Shmolik (Belarus)

Werder Bremen won 6–2 on aggregate.

11 September 2000
18:15

| Bohemians (Republic of Ireland) | 1–3 | (Germany) 1. FC Kaiserslautern |
|---|---|---|
| Crowe 90' (pen.) | Report | Reich 72'; Hristov 76'; Tare 79' |

Tolka Park, Dublin
Attendance: 3,500
Referee: Charles Agius (Malta)
21 September 2000
20:45

| 1. FC Kaiserslautern (Germany) | 0–1 | (Republic of Ireland) Bohemians |
|---|---|---|
| | Report | Crowe 37' |

Fritz-Walter-Stadion, Kaiserslautern
Attendance: 12,379
Referee: Mikko Vuorela (Finland)

1. FC Kaiserslautern won 3–2 on aggregate.

14 September 2000
20:30

| VfB Stuttgart (Germany) | 1–0 | (Scotland) Heart of Midlothian |
|---|---|---|
| Balakov 35' | Report |

Gottlieb-Daimler-Stadion, Stuttgart
Attendance: 9,845
Referee: Cosimo Bolognino (Italy)
28 September 2000
22:00

| Heart of Midlothian (Scotland) | 3–2 | (Germany) VfB Stuttgart |
|---|---|---|
| Naysmith 17'; Petrić 61'; Cameron 83' | Report | Hosny 38'; Bordon 58' |

Tynecastle Stadium, Edinburgh
Attendance: 14,480
Referee: Bruno Derrien (France)

3–3 on aggregate; VfB Stuttgart won on away goals.

12 September 2000
18:00

| Drnovice (Czech Republic) | 0–0 | (Germany) 1860 Munich |
|---|---|---|
| | Report |

Sportovní areál, Drnovice
Attendance: 7,024
Referee: Frank De Bleeckere (Belgium)
26 September 2000
18:00

| 1860 Munich (Germany) | 1–0 | (Czech Republic) Drnovice |
|---|---|---|
| Kurz 74' | Report |

Olympic Stadium, Munich
Attendance: 18,200
Referee: Asim Khudiyev (Azerbaijan)

1860 Munich won 1–0 on aggregate.

14 September 2000
17:00

| Lokomotiv Moscow (Russia) | 4–2 | (Bulgaria) Neftochimic Burgas |
|---|---|---|
| Sarkisyan 23'; Tsymbalar 32'; Janashia 62'; Pimenov 64' | Report | Petrov 10'; Timnev 54' |

Luzhniki Stadium, Moscow
Attendance: 4,900
Referee: Željko Širić (Croatia)
28 September 2000
18:00

| Neftochimic Burgas (Bulgaria) | 0–0 | (Russia) Lokomotiv Moscow |
|---|---|---|
| | Report |

Lazur Stadium, Burgas
Attendance: 7,440
Referee: Jack van Hulten (Netherlands)

Lokomotiv Moscow won 4–2 on aggregate.

12 September 2000
17:30

| IFK Norrköping (Sweden) | 2–2 | (Czech Republic) Slovan Liberec |
|---|---|---|
| Flodström 33'; Andersson 79' | Report | Lázzaro 70'; Nezmar 77' |

Idrottsparken, Norrköping
Attendance: 3,714
Referee: Yuri Baskakov (Russia)
28 September 2000
16:00

| Slovan Liberec (Czech Republic) | 2–1 | (Sweden) IFK Norrköping |
|---|---|---|
| Jun 62'; Nezmar 64' | Report | Bjurström 55' |

Stadion u Nisy, Liberec
Attendance: 6,480
Referee: Miroslav Radoman (FR Yugoslavia)

Slovan Liberec won 4–3 on aggregate.

14 September 2000
19:00

| Rapid București (Romania) | 0–1 | (England) Liverpool |
|---|---|---|
| | Report | Barmby 29' |

Stadionul Giuleşti-Valentin Stănescu, Bucharest
Attendance: 9,782
Referee: Nicolai Vollquartz (Denmark)
28 September 2000
21:05

| Liverpool (England) | 0–0 | (Romania) Rapid București |
|---|---|---|
| | Report |

Anfield, Liverpool
Attendance: 37,594
Referee: Miroslav Liba (Czech Republic)

Liverpool won 1–0 on aggregate.

14 September 2000
19:30

| Zürich (Switzerland) | 1–2 | (Belgium) Genk |
|---|---|---|
| Bartlett 64' | Report | Paas 52'; Ban 90' |

Letzigrund, Zürich
Attendance: 4,561
Referee: Bruno Coué (France)
28 September 2000
20:30

| Genk (Belgium) | 2–0 | (Switzerland) Zürich |
|---|---|---|
| Daerden 31'; Hendrikx 90' | Report |

Cristal Arena, Genk
Attendance: 8,500
Referee: Vasyl Melnychuk (Ukraine)

Genk won 4–1 on aggregate.

14 September 2000
17:45

| Olimpija Ljubljana (Slovenia) | 2–1 | (Spain) Espanyol |
|---|---|---|
| Jukic 15'; Rakovič 45' | Report | Gâlcă 44' (pen.) |

Bežigrad Stadium, Ljubljana
Attendance: 4,400
Referee: Stéphane Moulin (France)
28 September 2000
21:15

| Espanyol (Spain) | 2–0 | (Slovenia) Olimpija Ljubljana |
|---|---|---|
| Posse 15'; Manel 26' | Report |

Estadi Olímpic de Montjuïc, Barcelona
Attendance: 10,200
Referee: Helmut Fleischer (Germany)

Espanyol won 3–2 on aggregate.

14 September 2000
19:00

| Vorskla Poltava (Ukraine) | 1–2 | (Portugal) Boavista |
|---|---|---|
| Melaschenko 38' | Report | Couto 50'; Whelliton 89' |

Vorskla Stadium, Poltava
Attendance: 7,300
Referee: Eric Blareau (Belgium)
28 September 2000
21:00

| Boavista (Portugal) | 2–1 | (Ukraine) Vorskla Poltava |
|---|---|---|
| Sánchez 28'; Rogério 37' (pen.) | Report | Onopko 50' |

Estádio do Bessa, Porto
Attendance: 1,500
Referee: Dieter Schoch (Switzerland)

Boavista won 4–2 on aggregate.

14 September 2000
20:05

| Brøndby (Denmark) | 1–2 | (Croatia) Osijek |
|---|---|---|
| Jonson 38' | Report | Gašpar 32'; Mitu 55' |

Brøndby Stadium, Brøndbyvester
Attendance: 7,679
Referee: John Ferry (Northern Ireland)
28 September 2000
20:00

| Osijek (Croatia) | 0–0 | (Denmark) Brøndby |
|---|---|---|
| | Report |

Gradski vrt, Osijek
Attendance: 8,712
Referee: Paulo Manuel Gomes Costa (Portugal)

Osijek won 2–1 on aggregate.

14 September 2000
20:30

| Ruch Chorzów (Poland) | 0–3 | (Italy) Internazionale |
|---|---|---|
| | Report | Seedorf 62'; Recoba 66'; Keane 71' |

Stadion Slaski, Chorzów
Attendance: 13,000
Referee: Roelof Luinge (Netherlands)
28 September 2000
21:00

| Internazionale (Italy) | 4–1 | (Poland) Ruch Chorzów |
|---|---|---|
| Recoba 6'; Seedorf 41', 87'; Colombo 89' | Report | Skwara 85' |

San Siro, Milan
Attendance: 4,771
Referee: Metin Tokat (Turkey)

Internazionale won 7–1 on aggregate.

14 September 2000
20:45

| Pobeda (North Macedonia) | 0–2 | (Italy) Parma |
|---|---|---|
| | Report | Conceição 23'; Di Vaio 74' |

Philip II Arena, Skopje
Attendance: 9,500
Referee: Leif Sundell (Sweden)
28 September 2000
20:45

| Parma (Italy) | 4–0 | (North Macedonia) Pobeda |
|---|---|---|
| Montaño 36'; Bonazzoli 55', 78'; Di Vaio 88' | Report |

Stadio Ennio Tardini, Parma
Attendance: 6,169
Referee: Romans Lajuks (Latvia)

Parma won 6–0 on aggregate.

14 September 2000
18:30

| Lausanne-Sports (Switzerland) | 3–2 | (Russia) Torpedo Moscow |
|---|---|---|
| Kuźba 22', 48'; Mazzoni 51' | Report | Gashkin 14'; Litvinov 33' |

Stade Olympique de la Pontaise, Lausanne
Attendance: 3,100
Referee: Tomasz Mikulski (Poland)
28 September 2000
17:30

| Torpedo Moscow (Russia) | 0–2 | (Switzerland) Lausanne-Sports |
|---|---|---|
| | Report | Kuźba 29'; Puce 62' |

Luzhniki Stadium, Moscow
Attendance: 3,500
Referee: Alan Snoddy (Northern Ireland)

Lausanne-Sports won 5–2 on aggregate.

14 September 2000
21:30

| Celta Vigo (Spain) | 0–0 | (Croatia) Rijeka |
|---|---|---|
| | Report |

Balaídos, Vigo
Attendance: 8,300
Referee: Thomas McCurry (Scotland)
28 September 2000
20:45

| Rijeka (Croatia) | 0–1 (a.e.t.) | (Spain) Celta Vigo |
|---|---|---|
| | Report | Đorović 112' |

Stadion Kantrida, Rijeka
Attendance: 4,691
Referee: Massimo Busacca (Switzerland)

Celta Vigo won 1–0 on aggregate.

14 September 2000
20:45

| Leicester City (England) | 1–1 | (Federal Republic of Yugoslavia) Red Star Belgrade |
|---|---|---|
| Taggart 43' | Report | Ačimovič 2' |

Filbert Street, Leicester
Attendance: 20,198
Referee: Tom Henning Øvrebø (Norway)
28 September 2000 (Note: This match was played at Prater Stadium in Vienna instead of Red Star's home ground in Belgrade due to UEFA deciding to accommodate Leicester City's request in which the English club claimed that "travelling to FR Yugoslavia poses a security risk due to the political situation in the country". UEFA's decision was revealed on 12 September 2000—only nine days before the match's originally scheduled date (21 September 2000), with the match then postponed a week.)
19:00

| Red Star Belgrade (Federal Republic of Yugoslavia) | 3–1 | (England) Leicester City |
|---|---|---|
| Drulić 22', 71'; Gvozdenović 47' | Report | Izzet 41' |

Gerhard Hanappi Stadium, Vienna, Austria
Attendance: 12,731
Referee: Pasquale Rodomonti (Italy)

Red Star Belgrade won 4–2 on aggregate.

14 September 2000
18:30

| Roda JC (Netherlands) | 0–2 | (Slovakia) Inter Slovnaft Bratislava |
|---|---|---|
| | Report | Németh 21'; Babnič 68' |

Parkstad Limburg Stadion, Kerkrade
Attendance: 7,950
Referee: Paulo Paraty da Silva (Portugal)
26 September 2000
18:00

| Inter Slovnaft Bratislava (Slovakia) | 2–1 | (Netherlands) Roda JC |
|---|---|---|
| Németh 42'; Babnič 37' | Report | Tchoutang 53' |

Štadión Pasienky, Bratislava
Attendance: 3,050
Referee: Georgios Kasnaferis (Greece)

Inter Slovnaft Bratislava won 4–1 on aggregate.

14 September 2000
20:00

| Kryvbas Kryvyi Rih (Ukraine) | 0–1 | (France) Nantes |
|---|---|---|
| | Report | Ziani 81' |

Metalurh Stadium, Kryvyi Rih
Attendance: 16,000
Referee: Roy Helge Olsen (Norway)
28 September 2000
20:00

| Nantes (France) | 5–0 | (Ukraine) Kryvbas Kryvyi Rih |
|---|---|---|
| Moldovan 8', 33', 54'; Da Rocha 34'; Gillet 64' | Report |

Stade de la Beaujoire, Nantes
Attendance: 16,334
Referee: Sorin Corpodean (Romania)

Nantes won 6–0 on aggregate.

14 September 2000
20:00

| PAOK (Greece) | 3–1 | (Israel) Beitar Jerusalem |
|---|---|---|
| Camps 44'; Cohen 49' (o.g.); Nalitzis 55' | Report | Hamar 39' |

Toumba Stadium, Thessaloniki
Attendance: 17,584
Referee: Fiorenzo Treossi (Italy)
28 September 2000
18:00

| Beitar Jerusalem (Israel) | 3–3 | (Greece) PAOK |
|---|---|---|
| Sivilia 44', 61'; Abukasis 54' (pen.) | Report | Katsabis 15'; Nalitzis 42'; Konstantinidis 90' |

Teddy Stadium, Jerusalem
Attendance: 9,600
Referee: Attila Juhos (Hungary)

PAOK won 6–4 on aggregate.

14 September 2000
21:00

| Slavia Prague (Czech Republic) | 3–0 | (Denmark) AB |
|---|---|---|
| Kuchař 30', 74'; Došek 53' | Report |

Stadion Evžena Rošického, Prague
Attendance: 4,254
Referee: Muhittin Bosat (Turkey)
28 September 2000
18:30

| AB (Denmark) | 0–2 | (Czech Republic) Slavia Prague |
|---|---|---|
| | Report | Dostálek 46'; Došek 90' |

Gladsaxe Stadium, Gladsaxe
Attendance: 1,470
Referee: Fritz Stuchlik (Austria)

Slavia Prague won 5–0 on aggregate.

12 September 2000
18:00

| Rapid Wien (Austria) | 3–0 | (Sweden) Örgryte IS |
|---|---|---|
| Wagner 20'; Savićević 27'; Ratajczyk 79' | Report |

Gerhard Hanappi Stadium, Vienna
Attendance: 4,017
Referee: Georgios Borovilos (Greece)
28 September 2000
18:00

| Örgryte IS (Sweden) | 1–1 | (Austria) Rapid Wien |
|---|---|---|
| Johansson 73' | Report | Wagner 60' |

Ullevi, Gothenburg
Attendance: 1,701
Referee: Ceri Richards (Wales)

Rapid Wien won 4–1 on aggregate.

12 September 2000
18:00

| Gent (Belgium) | 0–6 | (Netherlands) Ajax |
|---|---|---|
| | Report | Arveladze 16'; Knopper 40', 69'; Grønkjær 70'; van der Vaart 80'; van der Gun 84' |

Jules Ottenstadion, Ghent
Attendance: 5,309
Referee: Juan Ansuátegui Roca (Spain)
28 September 2000
20:15

| Ajax (Netherlands) | 3–0 | (Belgium) Gent |
|---|---|---|
| Van der Gun 27', 58'; Van der Vaart 85' | Report |

Amsterdam ArenA, Amsterdam
Attendance: 21,000
Referee: Lutz Michael Fröhlich (Germany)

Ajax won 9–0 on aggregate.

14 September 2000
18:00

| Lillestrøm (Norway) | 3–1 | (Russia) Dynamo Moscow |
|---|---|---|
| Kristinsson 8', 13'; Kihlberg 68' | Report | Romaschenko 42' |

Åråsen Stadion, Lillestrøm
Attendance: 1,172
Referee: Luc Huyghe (Belgium)
28 September 2000
17:00

| Dynamo Moscow (Russia) | 2–1 | (Norway) Lillestrøm |
|---|---|---|
| Romaschenko 25'; Shtanyuk 44' | Report | Sundgot 71' |

Dynamo Stadium, Moscow
Attendance: 4,048
Referee: Michal Benes (Czech Republic)

Lillestrøm won 4–3 on aggregate.

12 September 2000
16:00

| Košice (Slovakia) | 2–3 | (Austria) GAK |
|---|---|---|
| Zvara 53'; Jambor 75' | Report | Akwuegbu 57'; Standfest 83'; Pamić 90' |

Všešportový areál, Košice
Attendance: 1,817
Referee: Kenny Clark (Scotland)
26 September 2000
18:00

| GAK (Austria) | 0–0 | (Slovakia) Košice |
|---|---|---|
| | Report |

Arnold Schwarzenegger Stadion, Graz
Attendance: 2,368
Referee: Laurent Duhamel (France)

GAK won 3–2 on aggregate.

14 September 2000
18:00

| CSKA Sofia (Bulgaria) | 1–2 | (Hungary) MTK Hungária |
|---|---|---|
| Yanev 7' | Report | Ferenczi 50'; Kuttor 70' |

Balgarska Armia Stadium, Sofia
Attendance: 20,010
Referee: Costas Kapitanis (Cyprus)
28 September 2000
17:05

| MTK Hungária (Hungary) | 0–1 | (Bulgaria) CSKA Sofia |
|---|---|---|
| | Report | Mirchev 85' (pen.) |

Hidegkuti Nándor Stadium, Budapest
Attendance: 1,850
Referee: Edo Trivkovic (Croatia)

2–2 on aggregate; MTK Hungária won on away goals.

14 September 2000
20:30

| Alavés (Spain) | 0–0 | (Turkey) Gaziantepspor |
|---|---|---|
| | Report |

Mendizorrotza Stadium, Vitoria-Gasteiz
Attendance: 11,446
Referee: Steve Dunn (England)
28 September 2000
18:15

| Gaziantepspor (Turkey) | 3–4 | (Spain) Alavés |
|---|---|---|
| Yiğit 13'; Polat 35'; Albayrak 90' | Report | Alonso 30'; Tomić 55', 79'; Moreno 72' |

Gaziantep Kamil Ocak Stadium, Gaziantep
Attendance: 9,901
Referee: Éric Poulat (France)

Alavés won 4–3 on aggregate.

14 September 2000
20:30

| Tirol Innsbruck (Austria) | 3–1 | (Italy) Fiorentina |
|---|---|---|
| Gilewicz 28', 49'; Baur 45' (pen.) | Report | Mijatović 53' |

Tivoli Neu, Innsbruck
Attendance: 13,190
Referee: Jorge Coroado (Portugal)
28 September 2000
20:30

| Fiorentina (Italy) | 2–2 | (Austria) Tirol Innsbruck |
|---|---|---|
| Mijatović 22'; Leandro Amaral 62' | Report | Mair 18'; Gilewicz 88' |

Stadio Artemio Franchi, Florence
Attendance: 22,215
Referee: Orhan Erdemir (Turkey)

Tirol Innsbruck won 5–3 on aggregate.

14 September 2000
20:00

| Club Brugge (Belgium) | 2–0 | (Cyprus) APOEL |
|---|---|---|
| Simons 37'; Mendoza 63' | Report |

Jan Breydel Stadium, Bruges
Attendance: 7,023
Referee: Kristinn Jakobsson (Iceland)
28 September 2000
18:00

| APOEL (Cyprus) | 0–1 | (Belgium) Club Brugge |
|---|---|---|
| | Report | Mendoza 30' |

GSP Stadium, Nicosia
Attendance: 1,241
Referee: Milan Mitrović (Slovenia)

Club Brugge won 3–0 on aggregate.

14 September 2000
18:00

| CSKA Moscow (Russia) | 0–0 | (Denmark) Viborg |
|---|---|---|
| | Report |

Dynamo Stadium, Moscow
Attendance: 9,500
Referee: Georgios Douros (Greece)
26 September 2000
18:00

| Viborg (Denmark) | 1–0 (a.e.t.) | (Russia) CSKA Moscow |
|---|---|---|
| Kærgaard 100' | Report |

Silkeborg Stadion, Silkeborg
Attendance: 3,196
Referee: Jouni Hyytiä (Iceland)

Viborg won 1–0 on aggregate.

14 September 2000
20:45

| Celtic (Scotland) | 2–0 | (Finland) HJK |
|---|---|---|
| Larsson 14', 25' | Report |

Celtic Park, Glasgow
Attendance: 40,545
Referee: Dietmar Drabek (Austria)
28 September 2000
19:00

| HJK (Finland) | 2–1 (a.e.t.) | (Scotland) Celtic |
|---|---|---|
| Roiha 42', 76' | Report | Sutton 108' |

Sonera Stadium, Helsinki
Attendance: 6,530
Referee: Ladislav Gadosi (Slovakia)

Celtic won 3–2 on aggregate.

14 September 2000
18:00

| Gueugnon (France) | 0–0 | (Greece) Iraklis |
|---|---|---|
| | Report |

Stade Jean Laville, Gueugnon
Attendance: 5,569
Referee: Hermann Albrecht (Germany)
28 September 2000
20:00

| Iraklis (Greece) | 1–0 | (France) Gueugnon |
|---|---|---|
| Konstantinou 77' | Report |

Kaftanzoglio Stadium, Thessaloniki
Attendance: 6,000
Referee: Marcel Lică (Romania)

Iraklis won 1–0 on aggregate.

14 September 2000
20:45

| Chelsea (England) | 1–0 | (Switzerland) St. Gallen |
|---|---|---|
| Panucci 25' | Report |

Stamford Bridge, London
Attendance: 18,196
Referee: Victor José Esquinas Torres (Spain)
28 September 2000
20:45

| St. Gallen (Switzerland) | 2–0 | (England) Chelsea |
|---|---|---|
| Müller 19'; Amoah 35' | Report |

Hardturm, Zürich
Attendance: 15,620
Referee: Pascal Garibian (France)

St. Gallen won 2–1 on aggregate.

14 September 2000
21:30

| Zaragoza (Spain) | 4–1 | (Poland) Wisła Kraków |
|---|---|---|
| Yordi 63', 68'; Acuña 30'; Sáenz 54' | Report | Kałużny 12' |

Romareda, Zaragoza
Attendance: 20,500
Referee: Edgar Steinborn (Germany)
28 September 2000
15:00

| Wisła Kraków (Poland) | 4–1 (a.e.t.) | (Spain) Zaragoza |
|---|---|---|
| Iheanacho 51'; Frankowski 54', 87'; Moskal 61' | Report | Baszczyński 6' (o.g.) |
Penalties
| Żurawski (penalty scored); Zajac (penalty scored); Głowacki (penalty scored); Baszczyński (penalty missed); Frankowski (penalty scored) | 4–3 | (penalty scored) Aragón; (penalty scored) Acuña; (penalty missed) Juanele; (penalty scored) Yordi; (penalty missed) José Ignacio |

Stadion Miejski in Kraków, Kraków
Attendance: 4,500
Referee: Morgan Norman (Sweden)

5–5 on aggregate; Wisła Kraków won 4–3 on penalties.

14 September 2000
19:30

| Molde (Norway) | 0–1 | (Spain) Rayo Vallecano |
|---|---|---|
| | Report | Bolo 16' |

Molde stadion, Molde
Attendance: 3,348
Referee: Zoran Arsic (FR Yugoslavia)
28 September 2000
21:00

| Rayo Vallecano (Spain) | 1–1 | (Norway) Molde |
|---|---|---|
| Michel 37' (pen.) | Report | Hulsker 74' |

Estadio Teresa Rivero, Madrid
Attendance: 5,290
Referee: Vladimír Hriňák (Slovakia)

Rayo Vallecano won 2–1 on aggregate.

14 September 2000
15:45

| HIT Gorica (Slovenia) | 1–4 | (Italy) Roma |
|---|---|---|
| Žlogar 29' | Report | Delvecchio 17', 19', 49'; Samuel 41' |

Stadion Športni Park, Nova Gorica
Attendance: 2,200
Referee: Constantin Zotta (Romania)
28 September 2000
18:30

| Roma (Italy) | 7–0 | (Slovenia) HIT Gorica |
|---|---|---|
| Samuel 8'; Montella 11', 19'; Delvecchio 23'; Totti 41', 47'; Batistuta 66' | Report |

Stadio Olimpico, Rome
Attendance: 5,117
Referee: Wolfgang Stark (Germany)

Roma won 11–1 on aggregate.

14 September 2000
19:00

| AIK (Sweden) | 0–1 | (Denmark) Herfølge |
|---|---|---|
| | Report | Falck 23' |

Råsunda Stadium, Solna
Attendance: 7,159
Referee: Dick van Egmond (Netherlands)
28 September 2000
20:30

| Herfølge (Denmark) | 1–1 (a.e.t.) | (Sweden) AIK |
|---|---|---|
| Jensen 96' | Report | Novaković 50' (pen.) |

SEAS-NVE Park, Herfølge
Attendance: 1,659
Referee: Attila Hanacsek (Hungary)

Herfølge won 2–1 on aggregate.

14 September 2000
19:00

| Vitesse (Netherlands) | 3–0 | (Israel) Maccabi Haifa |
|---|---|---|
| Martel 19'; Peeters 63'; Amoah 90' | Report |

GelreDome, Arnhem
Attendance: 12,350
Referee: Aleh Chykun (Belarus)
28 September 2000
18:00

| Maccabi Haifa (Israel) | 2–1 | (Netherlands) Vitesse |
|---|---|---|
| Jano 68'; Atar 88' | Report | Amoah 90' |

Kiryat Eliezer Stadium, Haifa
Attendance: 2,036
Referee: John Rowbotham (Scotland)

Vitesse won 4–2 on aggregate.

12 September 2000
18:00

| Vasas (Hungary) | 2–2 | (Greece) AEK Athens |
|---|---|---|
| Pető 89'; Komódi 90' | Report | Pető 47' (o.g.); Nikolaidis 50' |

Ferenc Puskás Stadium, Budapest
Attendance: 2,114
Referee: Martin Ingvarsson (Sweden)
28 September 2000
20:00

| AEK Athens (Greece) | 2–0 | (Hungary) Vasas |
|---|---|---|
| Maladenis 27'; Nikolaidis 30' | Report |

Nikos Goumas Stadium, Nea Filadelfeia
Attendance: 11,210
Referee: Serguei Goussev (Russia)

AEK Athens won 4–2 on aggregate.

14 September 2000
20:45

| Partizan (Federal Republic of Yugoslavia) | 1–1 | (Portugal) Porto |
|---|---|---|
| Ranković 24' | Report | Pena 89' |

Partizan Stadium, Belgrade
Attendance: 23,427
Referee: Paul Allaerts (Belgium)
28 September 2000
22:30

| Porto (Portugal) | 1–0 | (Federal Republic of Yugoslavia) Partizan |
|---|---|---|
| Drulović 90' | Report |

Estádio das Antas, Porto
Attendance: 15,610
Referee: Roelof Luinge (Netherlands)

Porto won 2–1 on aggregate.

14 September 2000
16:00

| Alania Vladikavkaz (Russia) | 0–3 | (Poland) Amica Wronki |
|---|---|---|
| | Report | Kryszałowicz 45'; Król 49'; Zieńczuk 89' |

Republican Spartak Stadium, Vladikavkaz
Attendance: 16,200
Referee: Philippe Leuba (Switzerland)
28 September 2000
18:30

| Amica Wronki (Poland) | 2–0 | (Russia) Alania Vladikavkaz |
|---|---|---|
| Kryszałowicz 37'; Sobociński 73' | Report |

Stadion Amica, Wronki
Attendance: 2,700
Referee: Andreas Georgiou (Cyprus)

Amica Wronki won 5–0 on aggregate.

14 September 2000
20:00

| Halmstads BK (Sweden) | 2–1 | (Portugal) Benfica |
|---|---|---|
| Svensson 35'; Selaković 57' | Report | van Hooijdonk 40' |

Örjans Vall, Halmstad
Attendance: 3,796
Referee: Jacek Granat (Poland)
28 September 2000
22:00

| Benfica (Portugal) | 2–2 | (Sweden) Halmstads BK |
|---|---|---|
| van Hooijdonk 24'; Miguel 90' | Report | Gustafson 32'; Selaković 88' |

Estádio da Luz, Lisbon
Attendance: 18,000
Referee: Franz-Xaver Wack (Germany)

Halmstads BK won 4–3 on aggregate.

14 September 2000
20:45

| Dunaferr (Hungary) | 0–1 | (Netherlands) Feyenoord |
|---|---|---|
| | Report | Molnár 60' (o.g.) |

Stadion ETO, Győr
Attendance: 13,000
Referee: Jon Skjervold (Norway)
28 September 2000
20:00

| Feyenoord (Netherlands) | 3–1 | (Hungary) Dunaferr |
|---|---|---|
| de Haan 17'; Korneev 47'; van Vossen 83' | Report | Tököli 88' |

De Kuip, Rotterdam
Attendance: 24,000
Referee: Massimo De Santis (Italy)

Feyenoord won 4–1 on aggregate.

12 September 2000
18:00

| Lierse (Belgium) | 0–0 | (France) Bordeaux |
|---|---|---|
| | Report |

Herman Vanderpoortenstadion, Lier
Attendance: 4,151
Referee: José Joâo Mendes Pratas (Portugal)
26 September 2000
18:00

| Bordeaux (France) | 5–1 | (Belgium) Lierse |
|---|---|---|
| Pauleta 24', 47', 90'; Feindouno 58', 73' | Report | Cavens 61' |

Stade Chaban-Delmas, Bordeaux
Attendance: 8,883
Referee: Bernhard Brugger (Austria)

Bordeaux won 5–1 on aggregate.

14 September 2000
18:30

| Polonia Warsaw (Poland) | 0–1 | (Italy) Udinese |
|---|---|---|
| | Report | Warley 56' |

Kazimierz Górski Stadium, Płock
Attendance: 2,000
Referee: Manuel Mejuto González (Spain)
26 September 2000
18:00

| Udinese (Italy) | 2–0 | (Poland) Polonia Warsaw |
|---|---|---|
| Walem 32'; Muzzi 89' | Report |

Stadio Friuli, Udine
Attendance: 11,159
Referee: William Young (Scotland)

Udinese won 3–0 on aggregate.

12 September 2000
18:00

| Basel (Switzerland) | 3–2 | (Norway) Brann |
|---|---|---|
| Magro 7'; Tchouga 53'; Kreuzer 86' | Report | Ludvigsen 16'; Helstad 72' |

Hardturm, Zürich
Attendance: 3,215
Referee: Igor Ishchenko (Ukraine)
28 September 2000
19:30

| Brann (Norway) | 4–4 | (Switzerland) Basel |
|---|---|---|
| Karadas 4', 40'; Brendesæter 9'; Terehhov 31' | Report | Tchouga 20'; Wassberg 59' (o.g.); Kreuzer 61' (pen.); Muff 90' |

Brann Stadion, Bergen
Attendance: 4,176
Referee: Dani Koren (Israel)

Basel won 7–6 on aggregate.

14 September 2000
16:30

| Napredak Kruševac (Federal Republic of Yugoslavia) | 0–0 | (Greece) OFI |
|---|---|---|
| | Report |

Stadion Mladost, Kruševac
Attendance: 7,733
Referee: Sten Kaldma (Estonia)
28 September 2000
20:00

| OFI (Greece) | 6–0 | (Federal Republic of Yugoslavia) Napredak Kruševac |
|---|---|---|
| Mauro 14', 45'; Gómez 25' (pen.), 50' (pen.); Iordanidis 23'; Digozis 36' | Report |

Theodoros Vardinogiannis Stadium, Heraklion
Attendance: 1,420
Referee: Jaroslav Jara (Czech Republic)

OFI won 6–0 on aggregate.

14 September 2000
18:00

| Slovan Bratislava (Slovakia) | 0–3 | (Croatia) Dinamo Zagreb |
|---|---|---|
| | Report | Mujčin 38'; Cvitanović 61'; Pilipović 90' |

Tehelné pole, Bratislava
Attendance: 6,800
Referee: Andreas Schluchter (Switzerland)
28 September 2000
18:30

| Dinamo Zagreb (Croatia) | 1–1 | (Slovakia) Slovan Bratislava |
|---|---|---|
| Mujčin 70' | Report | Sedlák 5' |

Stadion Maksimir, Zagreb
Attendance: 5,780
Referee: Eduardo Iturralde González (Spain)

Dinamo Zagreb won 4–1 on aggregate.
