= Dani Güiza =

Spanish footballer (born 1980)

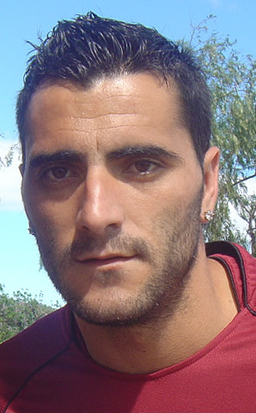
- Güiza as a Mallorca player in 2008

Personal information
- Full name: Daniel González Güiza
- Date of birth: 17 August 1980 (age 46)
- Place of birth: Jerez de la Frontera, Spain
- Height: 1.83 m (6 ft 0 in)
- Position: Striker

Team information
- Current team: Trebujena
- Number: 10

Youth career
- Xerez

Senior career*
Years	Team	Apps	(Gls)
1998–1999	Xerez	16	(1)
1999–2002	Mallorca B	70	(37)
1999–2003	Mallorca	7	(1)
1999–2000	→ Dos Hermanas (loan)	18	(9)
2002–2003	→ Recreativo (loan)	4	(0)
2003	→ Barcelona B (loan)	13	(5)
2003–2005	Ciudad Murcia	81	(36)
2005–2007	Getafe	61	(20)
2007–2008	Mallorca	37	(27)
2008–2011	Fenerbahçe	62	(23)
2011–2015	Getafe	32	(3)
2012–2013	→ Johor Darul Ta'zim (loan)	10	(6)
2013–2015	→ Cerro Porteño (loan)	46	(15)
2015–2017	Cádiz	47	(15)
2017–2022	Atlético Sanluqueño	107	(14)
2022–2023	Algaida	10	(0)
2023	Rota	12	(2)
2023–2024	Algaida	20	(0)
2024–2025	Roteña	23	(4)
2025–2026	Rayo Sanluqueño	13	(1)
2026	Jerez Industrial	12	(5)
2026–	Trebujena	7	(3)

International career
2007–2010	Spain	21	(6)
Medal record
Representing Spain
UEFA European Championship
Winner	2008 Austria-Switzerland
- * Club domestic league appearances and goals as of 00:17, 28 October 2026 (UTC)

Daniel González Güiza (Spanish pronunciation: [da'njel ˈɣwiθa]; born 17 August 1980) is a Spanish professional footballer who plays as a striker for Primera Andaluza club Trebujena.

A late bloomer, he made a name for himself at the age of 27, being crowned La Liga top scorer with Mallorca. Subsequently, he helped the Spain national team win Euro 2008, and signed with Fenerbahçe in Turkey shortly afterwards.

Over eight seasons, Güiza amassed Spanish top division totals of 141 matches and 52 goals, mainly with Mallorca and Getafe. Throughout his career, he played in three continents.

== Club career ==
=== Early years ===
Having started playing on the streets of his hometown of Jerez de la Frontera in Cádiz, Güiza used to hide behind trees in an attempt to avoid the running, despite being then coached by boyhood idol Kiko, who begun his professional career with local Cádiz CF. He eventually made it into his local club Xerez CD and, after one season there, first showed his eye for goal at Segunda División B side Dos Hermanas CF, loaned immediately after RCD Mallorca bought him. Such performances saw him make his debut in La Liga for the latter at the age of 19, but he would fail to perform, being relegated to the reserves.

Güiza was then loaned out to Recreativo de Huelva, but could not find a secure place in the team, and moved soon after to FC Barcelona B, also on loan. Subsequently, he joined Ciudad de Murcia of the Segunda División, where his career saw a turning point with two consecutive top-five finishes in the top scorers' list (runner-up in the 2004–05 season).

=== Getafe ===
This impressed Bernd Schuster enough to sign Güiza for Getafe CF in the summer of 2005. He was an instant first-choice at his new team and became recognised as a top flight striker, scoring 27 goals in 70 competitive games – seven in nine Copa del Rey appearances – while the team from the Madrid outskirts achieved back-to-back ninth-league places.

The club's president, Ángel Torres, described him as "the best finisher in the first division after Ronaldo". On 10 May 2007, he was one of three players on target in a 4–0 home defeat of FC Barcelona in the semi-finals of the Copa del Rey, which meant qualification for the decisive match for the first time ever after a 6–5 aggregate win.

=== Mallorca ===
Güiza returned to Mallorca in August 2007 in a €5 million move, brokered by his wife and agent Nuria Bermúdez, experiencing a breakthrough season. On 20 April 2008, he scored a hat-trick against Real Murcia CF, and finished the campaign as the league's top scorer by scoring 27 goals in 37 matches, a feat achieved without a single penalty kick.

Club coach Gregorio Manzano said: "In 24 years of coaching I've never had the winner of the Pichichi in my team. Dani is the top goalscorer in our league, and deserves extra credit for doing it without taking penalties, and he is also worthy of selection to Euro 2008".

=== Fenerbahçe ===
On 8 July 2008, Güiza joined Turkish club Fenerbahçe SK for €14 million. He managed to score twice in the Süper Lig in his first month, adding another two in the team's run in the UEFA Champions League.

Güiza ended a long scoring drought on 22 March 2009 with an early goal against Bursaspor, as Fenerbahçe lost 2–1 in the dying minutes of the game. Prior to the beginning of 2009–10 he put three past Budapest Honvéd FC in the third qualifying round of the UEFA Europa League, in a 5–1 home win (6–2 on aggregate), netting his first in the domestic competition in matchday one against Denizlispor, in the first minute of the game.

In his first two seasons in Istanbul, Güiza helped the team to consecutive Turkish Cup finals, netting in the 2008–09 edition in a 4–2 loss to Beşiktaş JK.

=== Return to Getafe ===
On 18 August 2011, one day after his 31st birthday, Güiza moved to former club Getafe for €6 million, agreeing to a three-year contract shortly after. He was regularly played in the first season in his second spell, starting in 15 of his appearances, but failed to reproduce his previous form and scored just three goals.

On 6 November 2012, Güiza signed for Malaysia Super League side Johor Darul Ta'zim F.C. on a season-long loan. His move, along with the acquisition of former SS Lazio winger Simone Del Nero and seven Malaysian internationals, was part of the club's major restructuring plans upon the appointment of Tunku Ismail Idris, the Crown Prince of Johor, as president; based on past achievements and honours the player, at the time of his signing, was arguably the most prolific footballer to have competed in the league.

Güiza made his first competitive appearance and league debut for his new team on 8 January 2013, in an opening day away game against Pahang FA: despite a 3–2 defeat, he provided the assists for both of his side's goals. He scored his first competitive goal on 15 January in an away game against treble-winners Kelantan FA, with an expertly curled free kick from 25 yards out as the game ended 1–1. Three days later, he netted from open play in a home fixture against 2012 Malaysia Cup runners-up ATM FA, with a volleyed lob from the edge of the penalty area in an eventual 2–2 draw.

Güiza played his last match for Johor Darul Takzim on 6 April 2013 in a 2–1 loss against Selangor FA in the FA Cup, after his loan was ended prematurely. Both he and Del Nero left the club.

In July 2013, Güiza joined Cerro Porteño on loan; his signing was initially criticised by the Paraguayan press. He made his debut on 14 September of that year as a 69th-minute substitute against Sportivo Carapeguá, scoring four minutes later in a 4–0 home win as the team went on to win their 30th Paraguayan Primera División title.

Güiza also featured in the following year's Copa Libertadores, netting three times to help to progress from the group stage and leading to interest from other clubs, to which he responded: "My heart is here, from day one they have shown me affection, my heart is what drives me, so I'm staying here". However, new manager Leonardo Astrada did not have the player in his plans, which led to his release in March 2015 despite having a contract running until June; he also cited the poor health of his father as one of the main reasons for his departure.

During his spell at the Estadio General Pablo Rojas, Güiza scored 20 goals from 59 competitive appearances. Years after leaving, he was offered a deal at Cerro's rivals Olimpia Asunción, but rejected the offer.

=== Cádiz ===
In August 2015, Güiza returned to his native Andalusia, signing for Cádiz. His arrival drew the ire of fans, due to disparaging remarks he had made about the club a decade ago while playing for local rivals Xerez.

On 26 June 2016, Güiza scored the only goal at Hércules CF in the second leg of the play-off finals (2–0 on aggregate), helping the team return to the second division after six years. On 4 July of the following year, after appearing sparingly during the season, he left.

=== Atlético Sanluqueño ===
On 10 July 2017, the 37-year-old Güiza signed a two-year contract for Atlético Sanluqueño CF, recently relegated to Tercera División. He achieved promotion to the third tier via the playoffs in his first season, having earlier become one of the few players to score in all of Spain's top four divisions.

Güiza remained in Sanlúcar de Barrameda for the ensuing seasons, agreeing to new one-year deals in June 2019 and May 2020, while his game time and goals decreased. On 3 January 2021, the 40-year-old scored his first goal of the campaign to secure a 2–1 win at Cádiz CF B, after which he asked for forgiveness from his former club.

=== Later career ===
In August 2022, Güiza left Sanluqueño. Shortly after, he joined amateurs UD Algaida.

Güiza signed with Tercera Federación club CD Rota on 19 January 2023. He remained in amateur football the following seasons, with Algaida, UD Roteña, Rayo Sanluqueño and Jerez Industrial CF.

== International career ==
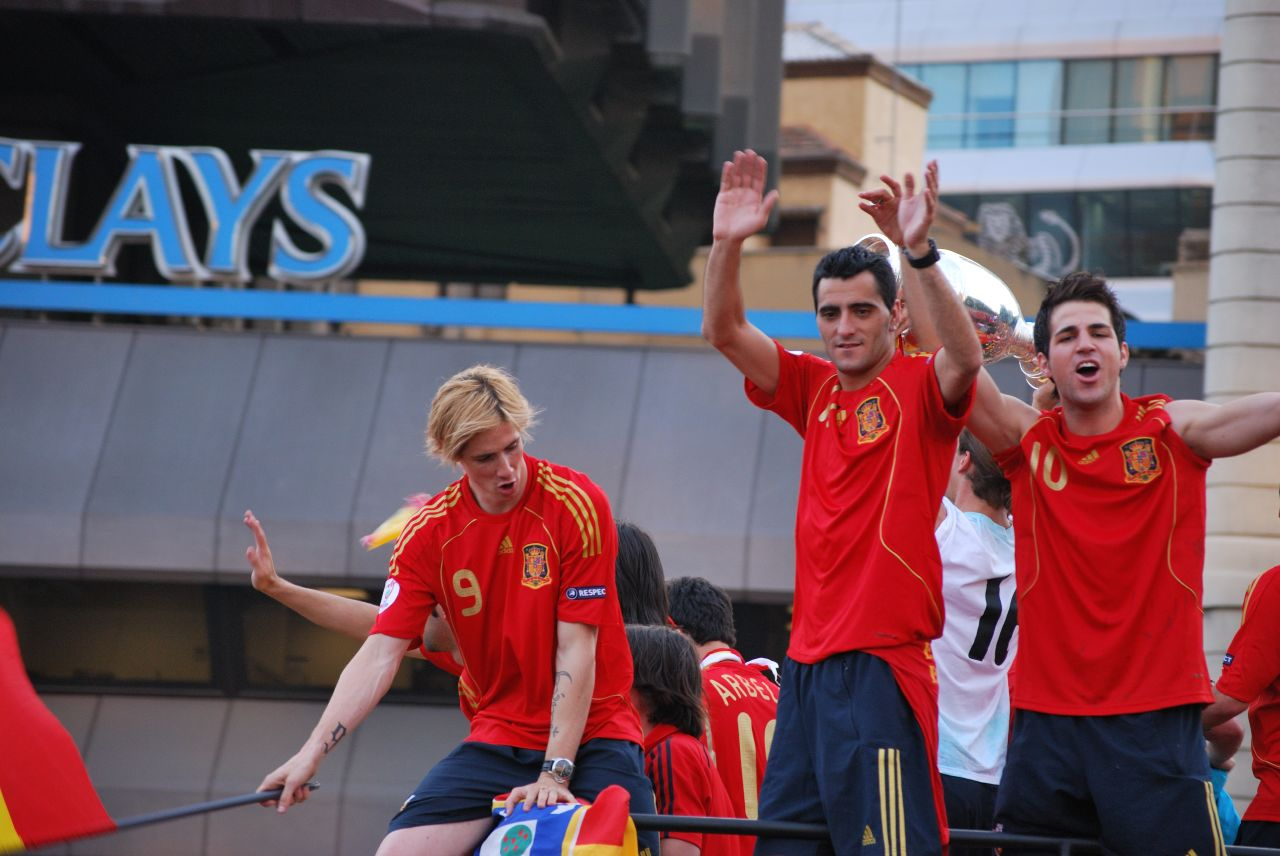
Fernando Torres, Güiza and Cesc Fàbregas celebrating after their success at Euro 2008

Güiza was a late bloomer on the international stage, having been first called up by Spain on 8 November 2007 (aged 27) for UEFA Euro 2008 qualifiers against Sweden and Northern Ireland, as the national team was already qualified for the finals in Austria and Switzerland. He made his international debut against the latter on 21 November, in a 1–0 home win in Las Palmas.

Güiza was subsequently selected to the final squad of 23 but, despite being the league's top scorer in that year, still doubted his chances of being picked: "I was really scared I'd miss out, because being the league's top scorer doesn't guarantee you a place". On 18 June 2008 he made his debut in the tournament, and scored Spain's winning goal against Greece during the dying moments of the last match group stage match. In the quarter-finals he came on as a substitute against Italy, missing the team's fourth attempt in an eventual penalty shootout win.

In the semi-final match against Russia, Güiza netted his second international goal, in a 3–0 win: after receiving a pass from Cesc Fàbregas, he quickly side-flicked it over the goalkeeper. He played 15 minutes in the final against Germany after replacing Fernando Torres (who scored the game's only goal), and came very close to assisting Marcos Senna.

On 15 October 2008, Güiza came on as a late substitute against Belgium, and soon after assisted David Villa who scored the winning goal in a close 2–1 contest for the 2010 FIFA World Cup qualifiers.

After an article circulated in January 2009 involving details about personal life and behaviour in training, Güiza's international career future was questioned. Such reports on his behaviour became debatable due to the unreliable sources and any rumours of him being dropped from the Spain team were put to rest when Vicente del Bosque called him up for his services for the 2010 World Cup qualification matches against Turkey, where he solidified his superb performance against Belgium, once again coming on in the dying minutes and assisting a last-minute winner during the match held in Istanbul.

On 1 June 2009, Güiza was selected to the 2009 FIFA Confederations Cup. On the 28th he came from the bench as the national team trailed hosts South Africa (0–1) in the third-place match, and responded with a spectacular brace in the last two minutes as Spain eventually won the game in extra-time (3–2).

Güiza also played for the Andalusia autonomous team on 27 December 2006, scoring twice in a 3–1 win over a combined Israel–Palestine side at the Estadio de La Cartuja in Seville.

== Personal life ==
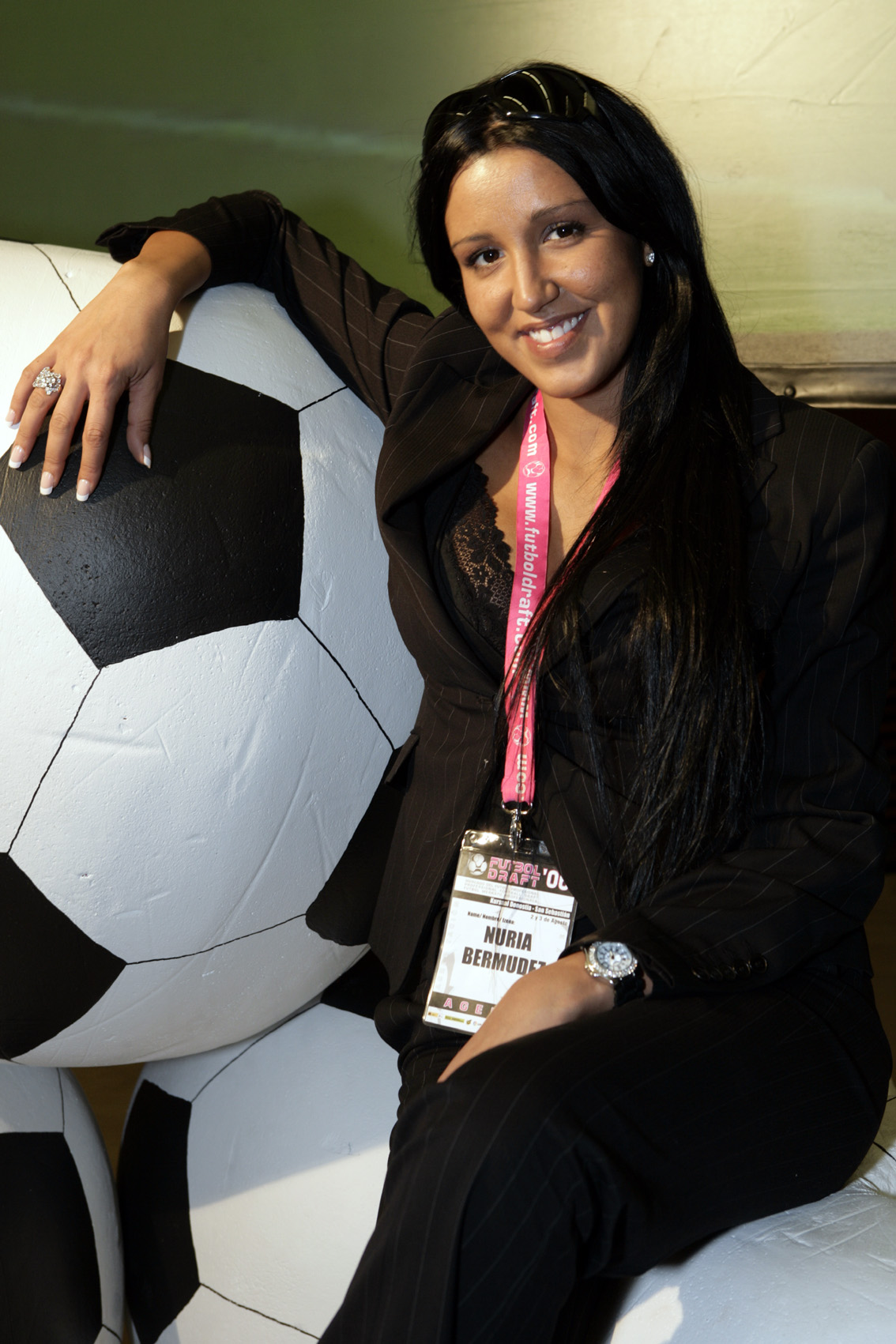
Güiza's partner and agent, Nuria Bermúdez

Güiza was born to a humble family. He spent his childhood in the working class neighbourhood of La Liberación, in the south side of Jerez de la Frontera. He is of Romani descent.

Güiza suffered a divorce from his first wife Rocío with whom he had his first child, which gained a lot of publicity in the Spanish press. Furthermore, he admitted that "the night confuses me" and, after joining Getafe, he started to take advantage of the night life in Madrid, suffering a stomach infection as a result and subsequently being forced to go on a diet consisting of liquids alone.

During his time at Getafe, Güiza met Nuria Bermúdez. She sat for the qualifications to become an official FIFA football agent, which she passed scoring 29 points, just five below the top and went on to become Güiza's agent. She also obtained the highest score for a female football agent in Spain.

Speaking of his relationship with the model, Getafe coach Schuster said: "Ever since Dani's been with Nuria, he turns up to training and it doesn't look like he's slept under a bridge". On 1 December 2007, Bermúdez gave birth to Güiza's second son, also named Daniel, at Policlínica Miramar in Palma, Majorca.

Before Euro 2008, Güiza promised the media that if he were to win the competition, he would then propose to Bermúdez. In January 2009, the Spanish media began to publicise problems between his family and Bermúdez, with his mother apparently threatening to slit Bermúdez's throat for being a "thief". Bermúdez then left Turkey with son Daniel, amongst claims the latter was ignored by the father.

Güiza's ex-wife, Rocío Aranda, revealed that the two had met up just hours before the start of the match between England and Spain on 11 February 2009. According to Aranda, they met up in the hotel bar and went on to have sexual intercourse in one of the bedrooms. Subsequently, it was rumoured that Spain coach Del Bosque would drop him from the team. Güiza spoke against this in an interview with Marca saying: "The truth is, I hadn't seen my son in a while so I went to see him in the hotel, I have to take advantage of such opportunities to see my children. To make money, she [his ex-wife] makes up stories. I spoke with Hierro and I explained the situation. I told him that I had to see my son and I wanted to be with him. I explained everything. I tried my best to be with my son and the truth is the whole story has not come out well in the press."

== Career statistics ==
=== Club ===
As of 5 May 2024

Appearances and goals by club, season and competition
Club	Season	League			National cup (Note: Includes Copa del Rey, Turkish Cup, Malaysia FA Cup)		Continental		Other		Total	
Club	Season	Division	Apps	Goals	Apps	Goals	Apps	Goals	Apps	Goals	Apps	Goals
Xerez	1998–99	Segunda División B	16	1	0	0	–		–		16	1
Dos Hermanas (loan)	1999–2000	Segunda División B	18	9	1	0	–		–		19	9
Mallorca B	1999–2000	Segunda División B	17	9	–		–		–		17	9
Mallorca B	2000–01	Segunda División B	28	19	–		–		–		28	19
Mallorca B	2001–02	Segunda División B	25	9	–		–		–		25	9
Mallorca B	Total		70	37	–		–		–		70	37
Mallorca	1999–2000	La Liga	1	0	0	0	0	0	–		1	0
Mallorca	2000–01	La Liga	5	1	0	0	2 (Note: Appearances in UEFA Intertoto Cup)	2	–		7	3
Mallorca	2001–02	La Liga	0	0	2	0	–		–		2	0
Mallorca	2002–03	La Liga	1	0	0	0	–		–		1	0
Mallorca	Total		7	1	2	0	2	2	–		11	3
Recreativo (loan)	2002–03	La Liga	4	0	0	0	–		–		4	0
Barcelona B (loan)	2002–03	Segunda División B	13	5	–		–		2 (Note: Appearances in Segunda División B play-offs)	0	15	5
Ciudad Murcia	2003–04	Segunda División	40	16	2	0	–		–		42	16
Ciudad Murcia	2004–05	Segunda División	41	20	2	0	–		–		43	20
Ciudad Murcia	Total		81	36	4	0	–		–		85	36
Getafe	2005–06	La Liga	32	9	3	1	–		–		35	10
Getafe	2006–07	La Liga	29	11	6	6	–		–		35	17
Getafe	Total		61	20	9	7	–		–		70	27
Mallorca	2007–08	La Liga	37	27	3	2	–		–		40	29
Fenerbahçe	2008–09	Süper Lig	32	11	8	2	10 (Note: Appearances in UEFA Champions League)	3	–		50	16
Fenerbahçe	2009–10	Süper Lig	27	11	6	4	10 (Note: Appearances in UEFA Europa League)	3	1 (Note: Appearance in Turkish Super Cup)	0	44	18
Fenerbahçe	2010–11	Süper Lig	3	1	1	0	0	0	–		4	1
Fenerbahçe	Total		62	23	15	6	20	6	1	0	98	35
Getafe	2011–12	La Liga	32	3	2	0	–		–		34	3
Getafe	2012–13	La Liga	0	0	0	0	–		–		0	0
Getafe	Total		32	3	0	0	–		–		34	3
Johor Darul Ta'zim (loan)	2013	Malaysia Super League	10	6	3	2	–		–		13	8
Cerro Porteño	2013	Paraguayan Primera División	12	3	–		–		–		12	3
Cerro Porteño	2014	Paraguayan Primera División	32	12	–		11 (Note: Seven appearances and three goals in Copa Libertadores, four appearances and two goals in Copa Sudamericana)	5	–		43	17
Cerro Porteño	2015	Paraguayan Primera División	2	0	–		2 (Note: Appearances in Copa Libertadores)	0	–		4	0
Cerro Porteño	Total		46	15	0	0	13	5	–		59	20
Cádiz	2015–16	Segunda División B	35	13	3	0	–		–		38	13
Cádiz	2016–17	Segunda División	12	2	2	0	–		–		14	2
Cádiz	Total		47	15	5	0	–		–		52	15
Atlético Sanluqueño	2018–19	Segunda División B	31	7	0	0	–		–		31	7
Atlético Sanluqueño	2019–20	Segunda División B	21	0	0	0	–		–		21	0
Atlético Sanluqueño	2020–21	Segunda División B	13	1	0	0	–		–		13	1
Atlético Sanluqueño	2021–22	Primera División RFEF	17	1	0	0	–		–		17	1
Atlético Sanluqueño	Total		84	9	0	0	–		–		84	9
Algaida	2022–23	División de Honor	10	0	–		–		–		10	0
Rota	2022–23	Tercera Federación	12	2	–		–		–		12	2
Algaida	2023–24	División de Honor	20	0	–		–		–		20	0
Career total			627	209	44	17	35	13	3	0	709	239

=== International ===
Appearances and goals by national team and year
National team	Year	Apps	Goals
Spain	2007	1	0
Spain	2008	11	2
Spain	2009	8	4
Spain	2010	1	0
Total		21	6

Scores and results list Spain's goal tally first, score column indicates score after each Güiza goal.

List of international goals scored by Dani Güiza
No.	Date	Venue	Opponent	Score	Result	Competition
1	18 June 2008	Wals Siezenheim, Salzburg, Austria	Greece	2–1	2–1	UEFA Euro 2008
2	26 June 2008	Ernst Happel, Vienna, Austria	Russia	2–0	3–0	UEFA Euro 2008
3	9 June 2009	Tofiq Bahramov, Baku, Azerbaijan	Azerbaijan	5–0	6–0	Friendly
4	28 June 2009	Royal Bafokeng, Rustenburg, South Africa	South Africa	1–1	3–2	2009 FIFA Confederations Cup
5	28 June 2009	Royal Bafokeng, Rustenburg, South Africa	South Africa	2–1	3–2	2009 FIFA Confederations Cup
6	18 November 2009	Ernst Happel, Vienna, Austria	Austria	4–1	5–1	Friendly

== Honours ==
Fenerbahçe

- Süper Lig: 2010–11
- Turkish Super Cup: 2009

Cerro Porteño

- Paraguayan Primera División: Clausura 2013

Spain

- UEFA European Championship: 2008

Individual

- Pichichi Trophy: 2007–08
- Zarra Trophy: 2007–08
