= Mattias Flodström =

Swedish association football player

Personal information
- Full name: Bo Mattias Flodström
- Date of birth: 26 April 1972 (age 54)
- Place of birth: Linghem, Sweden
- Position: Forward

Youth career
- –1989: Linghems SK

Senior career*
Years	Team	Apps	(Gls)
1990	Linghems SK		
1991–1995	Linköpings FF		
1996–1998	Åtvidabergs FF		
1999–2002	IFK Norrköping	78	(21)
2003	IF Sylvia		
- * Club domestic league appearances and goals

Bo Mattias Flodström (born 26 April 1972) is a Swedish former professional footballer who played as a forward.

== Playing career ==
Starting off his career with the local club Linghems SK, Flodström went on to represent Linköpings FF, Åtvidabergs FF, and IF Sylvia in the Swedish lower divisions as well as IFK Norrköping for four seasons in Allsvenskan. His best season came during the 2000 Allsvenskan season when he scored ten goals in 24 games. In total, he scored 21 goals in 78 Allsvenskan games for IFK Norrköping. Flodström also represented IFK Norrköping in the 2000–01 UEFA Cup and scored two goals in four games as the club was eliminated in the first round by FC Slovan Liberec.
