= 2001–02 RCD Mallorca season =

RCD Mallorca
2001–02 season
- President: Mateu Alemany
- Head coach: Bernd Krauss (until 17 October); Sergije Krešić (from 18 October until 28 April); Tomeu Llompart (from 1 May)
- La Liga: 16th
- Copa del Rey: Round of 16
- UEFA Champions League: First group stage
- UEFA Cup: Third round
- Top goalscorer: League: Albert Luque (14); All: Albert Luque (15)

The 2001–02 season was the 86th season in the existence of RCD Mallorca and the club's fifth consecutive season in the top flight of Spanish football. In addition to the domestic league, Mallorca participated in this season's editions of the Copa del Rey, the UEFA Champions League and the UEFA Cup.

== Transfers ==
=== Out ===
No.	Pos.	Player	Transferred to	Fee	Date	Source
	FW	(Nigeria) Finidi George	(England) Ipswich Town	£3.1 million	16 August 2001	

== Competitions ==
=== Overall record ===
Competition	First match	Last match	Starting round	Final position	Record							
Competition	First match	Last match	Starting round	Final position	Pld	W	D	L	GF	GA	GD	Win %
La Liga	25 August 2001	11 May 2002	Matchday 1	16th	38	11	10	17	40	52	−12	28.95
Copa del Rey	10 October 2001	19 December 2001	Round of 64	Round of 16	4	1	2	1	3	3	+0	25.00
UEFA Champions League	8 August 2001	30 October 2001	Third qualifying round	First group stage	8	4	0	4	6	8	−2	50.00
UEFA Cup	22 November 2001	6 December 2001	Third round	Third round	2	0	0	2	2	5	−3	0.00
Total					52	16	12	24	51	68	−17	30.77

Source: Competitions

=== La Liga ===
==== League table ====
Pos	Team	Pld	W	D	L	GF	GA	GD	Pts	Qualification or relegation
14	Espanyol	38	13	8	17	47	56	−9	47 (Note: ESP 1–2 RSO; RSO 1–0 ESP)	
15	Villarreal	38	11	10	17	46	55	−9	43 (Note: MLL 0–1 VIL; VIL 2–1 MLL)	Qualification for the Intertoto Cup second round
16	Mallorca	38	11	10	17	40	52	−12	43	
17	Osasuna	38	10	12	16	36	49	−13	42	
18	Las Palmas (R)	38	9	13	16	40	50	−10	40	Relegation to the Segunda División

Source: LFP
Rules for classification: 1st points; 2nd head-to-head points; 3rd head-to-head goal difference; 4th head-to-head goals scored; 5th goal difference; 6th number of goals scored; 7th Fair-play points
(R) Relegated

==== Results by round ====
Round	1	2	3	4	5	6	7	8	9	10	11	12	13	14	15	16	17	18	19	20	21	22	23	24	25	26	27	28	29	30	31	32	33	34	35	36	37	38
Ground	H	A	H	A	H	A	H	A	H	A	H	A	A	H	A	H	A	H	A	A	H	A	H	A	H	A	H	A	H	A	H	H	A	H	A	H	A	H
Result	L	W	D	L	L	L	L	D	W	L	W	W	L	W	D	D	L	D	L	L	W	W	L	L	D	L	L	W	W	D	L	W	L	D	D	L	D	W
Position	18	12	12	14	18	18	18	18	18	19	18	16	18	13	16	16	16	16	18	18	17	16	17	17	17	18	19	17	14	13	16	15	16	16	17	18	17	16

Source: La Liga
A = Away; H = Home; W = Win; D = Draw; L = Loss

==== Matches ====
26 August 2001 1	Mallorca	0–3	Las Palmas	Palma
				Stadium: Son Moix

8 September 2001 2	Athletic Bilbao	0–1	Mallorca	Bilbao

15 September 2001 3	Mallorca	0–0	Alavés	Palma
				Stadium: Son Moix

23 September 2001 4	Celta Vigo	2–0	Mallorca	Vigo

30 September 2001 5	Mallorca	0–1	Villarreal	Palma
				Stadium: Son Moix

3 October 2001 6	Barcelona	3–0	Mallorca	Barcelona

7 October 2001 7	Mallorca	0–1	Zaragoza	Palma
				Stadium: Son Moix

13 October 2001 8	Sevilla	2–2	Mallorca	Seville

21 October 2001 9	Mallorca	3–0	Rayo Vallecano	Palma
				Stadium: Son Moix

27 October 2001 10	Osasuna	4–0	Mallorca	Pamplona

4 November 2001 11	Mallorca	2–0	Tenerife	Palma
				Stadium: Son Moix

11 November 2001 12	Real Sociedad	1–2	Mallorca	San Sebastián

18 November 2001 13	Espanyol	2–1	Mallorca	Barcelona

25 November 2001 14	Mallorca	4–1	Deportivo La Coruña	Palma
				Stadium: Son Moix

1 December 2001 15	Valencia	1–1	Mallorca	Valencia

9 December 2001 16	Mallorca	1–1	Málaga	Palma
				Stadium: Son Moix

16 December 2001 17	Real Betis	1–0	Mallorca	Seville

23 December 2001 18	Mallorca	1–1	Real Madrid	Palma
				Stadium: Son Moix

6 January 2002 19	Valladolid	2–1	Mallorca	Valladolid

13 January 2002 20	Las Palmas	3–1	Mallorca	Las Palmas

20 January 2002 21	Mallorca	3–0	Athletic Bilbao	Palma
				Stadium: Son Moix

27 January 2002 22	Alavés	0–4	Mallorca	Vitoria-Gasteiz

2 February 2002 23	Mallorca	0–1	Celta Vigo	Palma
				Stadium: Son Moix

6 February 2002 24	Villarreal	2–1	Mallorca	Villarreal

9 February 2002 25	Mallorca	0–0	Barcelona	Palma
				Stadium: Son Moix

17 February 2002 26	Zaragoza	1–0	Mallorca	Zaragoza

24 February 2002 27	Mallorca	0–4	Sevilla	Palma
				Stadium: Son Moix

3 March 2002 28	Rayo Vallecano	0–2	Mallorca	Madrid

10 March 2002 29	Mallorca	4–2	Osasuna	Palma
				Stadium: Son Moix

17 March 2002 30	Tenerife	0–0	Mallorca	Santa Cruz de Tenerife

24 March 2002 31	Mallorca	0–2	Real Sociedad	Palma
				Stadium: Son Moix

31 March 2002 32	Mallorca	2–1	Espanyol	Palma
				Stadium: Son Moix

6 April 2002 33	Deportivo La Coruña	5–0	Mallorca	A Coruña

13 April 2002 34	Mallorca	1–1	Valencia	Palma
				Stadium: Son Moix

21 April 2002 35	Málaga	0–0	Mallorca	Málaga

28 April 2002 36	Mallorca	1–3	Real Betis	Palma
				Stadium: Son Moix

5 May 2002 37	Real Madrid	0–0	Mallorca	Madrid

11 May 2002 38	Mallorca	2–1	Valladolid	Palma
				Stadium: Son Moix

=== Copa del Rey ===
10 October 2001 Round of 64	CD Díter Zafra	0–1	Mallorca

28 November 2001 Round of 32	AD Ceuta	0–0 (4–5 p)	Mallorca

12 December 2001 Round of 16; Second leg	Córdoba	2–1	Mallorca	Córdoba
21:00	Platero 22'; Lawal 70'		Riera 68'	Stadium: Nuevo Arcángel; Attendance: 6,000; Referee: Javier Turienzo Álvarez

19 December 2001 Round of 16; Second leg	Mallorca	1–1 (2–3 agg.)	Córdoba	Palma
21:30	Eto'o 8'		Cámara 56'	Stadium: Son Moix; Attendance: 6,000; Referee: Miguel Ángel Pérez Lasa

=== UEFA Champions League ===
==== Third qualifying round ====
8 August 2001 First leg	Hajduk Split (Croatia)	1–0	(Spain) Mallorca	Split, Croatia
20:15 CET	Bilić 29'	Report		Stadium: Stadion Poljud; Attendance: 26,922; Referee: Alain Sars (France)

21 August 2001 Second leg	Mallorca (Spain)	2–0 (a.e.t.) (2–1 agg.)	(Croatia) Hajduk Split	Palma
21:30 CET	Eto'o 25'; Luque 92'	Report		Stadium: San Moix Stadium; Attendance: 23,500; Referee: Hugh Dallas (Scotland)

==== First group stage ====
Pos	Team	Pld	W	D	L	GF	GA	GD	Pts	Qualification	PAN	ARS	MLL	SCH
1	(Greece) Panathinaikos	6	4	0	2	8	3	+5	12	Advance to second group stage	—	1–0	2–0	2–0
2	(England) Arsenal	6	3	0	3	9	9	0	9	Advance to second group stage	2–1	—	3–1	3–2
3	(Spain) Mallorca	6	3	0	3	4	9	−5	9	Transfer to UEFA Cup	1–0	1–0	—	0–4
4	(Germany) Schalke 04	6	2	0	4	9	9	0	6		0–2	3–1	0–1	—

Source: RSSSF

11 September 2001 1	Mallorca (Spain)	1–0	(England) Arsenal	Palma, Spain
20:45	Engonga 12' (pen.)	Report		Stadium: Son Moix; Attendance: 19,019; Referee: Knud Erik Fisker (Denmark)

19 September 2001 2	Panathinaikos (Greece)	2–0	(Spain) Mallorca	Athens, Greece
20:45	Vlaović 25'; Konstantinou 28'	Report		Stadium: Leoforos Alexandras Stadium; Attendance: 15,003; Referee: Konrad Plautz (Austria)

26 September 2001 3	Schalke 04 (Germany)	0–1	(Spain) Mallorca	Gelsenkirchen, Germany
20:45		Report	Eto'o 66'	Stadium: Parkstadion; Attendance: 51,850; Referee: Nikolai Levnikov (Russia)

16 October 2001 4	Mallorca (Spain)	0–4	(Germany) Schalke 04	Palma, Spain
20:45		Report	Van Hoogdalem 15'; Hajto 22' (pen.); Asamoah 77'; Sand 84'	Stadium: Son Moix; Attendance: 19,300; Referee: Jan Wegereef (Netherlands)

24 October 2001 5	Arsenal (England)	3–1	(Spain) Mallorca	London, England
20:45	Pires 61'; Bergkamp 63'; Henry 90+3'	Report	Novo 74'	Stadium: Highbury; Attendance: 34,764; Referee: Dick Jol (Netherlands)

30 October 2001 6	Mallorca (Spain)	1–0	(Greece) Panathinaikos	Palma, Spain
20:45	Biagini 57'	Report		Stadium: Son Moix; Attendance: 11,174; Referee: Karl-Erik Nilsson (Sweden)

=== UEFA Cup ===
==== Third round ====
22 November 2001 First leg	Slovan Liberec (Czech Republic)	3–1	(Spain) Mallorca	Liberec, Czech Republic
19:00	Lukáš 2'; Johana 19'; Jun 50'	Report	Biagini 60'	Stadium: Stadion u Nisy; Referee: Jacek Granat (Poland)

6 December 2001 Second leg	Mallorca (Spain)	1–2 (2–5 agg.)	(Czech Republic) Slovan Liberec	Palma
20:45	Eto'o 80' (pen.)	Report	Gyan 56'; Štajner 69'	Stadium: San Moix Stadium; Referee: Éric Poulat (France)
