= 2007–08 RCD Mallorca season =

RCD Mallorca
2007–08 season
- President: Vicenç Grande
- Head coach: Gregorio Manzano
- La Liga: 7th
- Copa del Rey: Quarter-finals
- Top goalscorer: League: Dani Güiza (27); All: Dani Güiza (29)
- Biggest win: Mallorca 7–1 Recreativo
- Biggest defeat: Real Betis 3–0 Mallorca

The 2007–08 season was the 91st season in the existence of RCD Mallorca and the club's 11th consecutive season in the top flight of Spanish football. In addition to the domestic league, Mallorca participated in this season's edition of the Copa del Rey. The season covered the period from 1 July 2007 to 30 June 2008.

== Pre-season and friendlies ==
Win Draw Loss

7 August 2007 Trofeu Ciutat de Palma	Mallorca (Spain)	3–0	(Germany) Bayern Munich	Palma, Spain
--:-- CEST (UTC+2)	Webó 4'; Güiza 24'; Víctor 82'			Stadium: Ono Estadi; Attendance: 22,000; Referee: Gonzalez (Spain)

== Competitions ==
=== Overview ===
Competition	First match	Last match	Starting round	Final position	Record							
Competition	First match	Last match	Starting round	Final position	Pld	W	D	L	GF	GA	GD	Win %
La Liga	26 August 2007	May 2008	Matchday 1	7th	38	15	14	9	69	54	+15	39.47
Copa del Rey	13 November 2007	30 January 2008	Round of 32	Quarter-finals	6	4	0	2	9	5	+4	66.67
Total					44	19	14	11	78	59	+19	43.18

Source: Competitions

=== La Liga ===
==== League table ====
Pos	Team	Pld	W	D	L	GF	GA	GD	Pts	Qualification or relegation
5	Sevilla	38	20	4	14	75	49	+26	64 (Note: ATM 4–3 SEV; SEV 1–2 ATM)	Qualification for the UEFA Cup first round
6	Racing Santander	38	17	9	12	42	41	+1	60	Qualification for the UEFA Cup first round
7	Mallorca	38	15	14	9	69	54	+15	59	
8	Almería	38	14	10	14	42	45	−3	52 (Note: DEP 0–3 ALM; ALM 1–0 DEP)	
9	Deportivo La Coruña	38	15	7	16	46	47	−1	52	Qualification for the Intertoto Cup third round

Source: LFP
Rules for classification: 1st points; 2nd head-to-head points; 3rd head-to-head goal difference; 4th head-to-head goals scored; 5th goal difference; 6th number of goals scored; 7th Fair-play points

==== Results summary ====
Overall								Home						Away					
Pld	W	D	L	GF	GA	GD	Pts	W	D	L	GF	GA	GD	W	D	L	GF	GA	GD
0	0	0	0	0	0	0	0	0	0	0	0	0	0	0	0	0	0	0	0

Source: La Liga

==== Results by round ====
Round	1	2	3	4	5	6	7	8	9	10	11	12	13	14	15	16	17	18	19	20	21	22	23	24	25	26	27	28	29	30	31	32	33	34	35	36	37	38
Ground	H	A	H	A	H	A	H	A	H	A	H	A	A	H	A	H	A	H	A	A	H	A	H	A	H	A	H	A	H	A	H	H	A	H	A	H	A	H
Result	W	D	L	D	W	L	W	W	D	D	L	L	W	D	L	D	L	L	D	D	W	D	D	D	D	D	W	L	W	W	D	L	W	W	W	W	W	W
Position	2	3	8	7	6	7	7	7	7	8	10	10	8	8	8	8	10	11	13	13	13	11	11	11	12	12	11	12	12	9	11	11	12	10	7	7	7	7

Source: La Liga
A = Away; H = Home; W = Win; D = Draw; L = Loss

==== Matches ====
The league fixtures were announced on 13 July 2007.

26 August 2007 1	Mallorca	3–0	Levante	Palma
--:-- CEST (UTC+2)				Stadium: Ono Estadi

2 September 2007 2	Atlético Madrid	1–1	Mallorca	Madrid
--:-- CEST (UTC+2)				Stadium: Vicente Calderón

16 September 2007 3	Mallorca	0–1	Villarreal	Palma
--:-- CEST (UTC+2)				Stadium: Ono Estadi

23 September 2007 4	Almería	1–1	Mallorca	Almería
--:-- CEST (UTC+2)				Stadium: Juegos Mediterráneos

26 September 2007 5	Mallorca	4–2	Valladolid	Palma
--:-- CEST (UTC+2)				Stadium: Ono Estadi

30 September 2007 6	Real Betis	3–0	Mallorca	Seville
--:-- CEST (UTC+2)				Stadium: Benito Villamarín

7 October 2007 7	Mallorca	4–2	Getafe	Palma
--:-- CEST (UTC+2)				Stadium: Ono Estadi

21 October 2007 8	Recreativo	0–2	Mallorca	Huelva
--:-- CEST (UTC+2)				Stadium: Estadio Nuevo Colombino

27 October 2007 9	Mallorca	2–2	Espanyol	Palma
--:-- CEST (UTC+2)				Stadium: Ono Estadi

31 October 2007 10	Deportivo La Coruña	1–1	Mallorca	A Coruña
--:-- CEST (UTC+2)				Stadium: Estadio Riazor

3 November 2007 11	Mallorca	0–2	Valencia	Palma
--:-- CEST (UTC+2)				Stadium: Ono Estadi

11 November 2007 12	Real Madrid	4–3	Mallorca	Madrid
--:-- CEST (UTC+2)				Stadium: Santiago Bernabéu

24 November 2007 13	Sevilla	1–2	Mallorca	Seville
--:-- CEST (UTC+2)				Stadium: Ramón Sánchez Pizjuán

2 December 2007 14	Mallorca	1–1	Murcia	Palma
--:-- CEST (UTC+2)				Stadium: Ono Estadi

9 December 2007 15	Racing Santander	3–1	Mallorca	Santander
--:-- CEST (UTC+2)				Stadium: Campos de Sport de El Sardinero

16 December 2007 16	Mallorca	0–0	Athletic Bilbao	Palma
--:-- CEST (UTC+2)				Stadium: Ono Estadi

23 December 2007 17	Osasuna	3–1	Mallorca	Pamplona
--:-- CEST (UTC+2)				Stadium: El Sadar

5 January 2008 18	Mallorca	0–2	Barcelona	Palma
--:-- CEST (UTC+2)				Stadium: Ono Estadi

12 January 2008 19	Zaragoza	2–2	Mallorca	Zaragoza
--:-- CEST (UTC+2)				Stadium: La Romareda

20 January 2008 20	Levante	2–2	Mallorca	Valencia
--:-- CEST (UTC+2)				Stadium: Estadi Ciutat de València

27 January 2008 21	Mallorca	1–0	Atlético Madrid	Palma
--:-- CEST (UTC+2)				Stadium: Ono Estadi

3 February 2008 22	Villarreal	1–1	Mallorca	Villarreal
--:-- CEST (UTC+2)				Stadium: Estadio El Madrigal

10 February 2008 23	Mallorca	0–0	Almería	Palma
--:-- CEST (UTC+2)				Stadium: Ono Estadi

17 February 2008 24	Valladolid	1–1	Mallorca	Valladolid
--:-- CEST (UTC+2)				Stadium: José Zorrilla

24 February 2008 25	Mallorca	1–1	Real Betis	Palma
--:-- CEST (UTC+2)				Stadium: Ono Estadi

2 March 2008 26	Getafe	3–3	Mallorca	Getafe
--:-- CEST (UTC+2)				Stadium: Coliseum Alfonso Pérez

9 March 2008 27	Mallorca	7–1	Recreativo	Palma
--:-- CEST (UTC+2)				Stadium: Ono Estadi

16 March 2008 28	Espanyol	2–1	Mallorca	Barcelona
--:-- CEST (UTC+2)				Stadium: Estadi Olímpic Lluís Companys

22 March 2008 29	Mallorca	1–0	Deportivo La Coruña	Palma
--:-- CEST (UTC+2)				Stadium: Ono Estadi

30 March 2008 30	Valencia	0–3	Mallorca	Valencia
--:-- CEST (UTC+2)				Stadium: Mestalla

5 April 2008 31	Mallorca	1–1	Real Madrid	Palma
--:-- CEST (UTC+2)				Stadium: Ono Estadi

13 April 2008 32	Mallorca	2–3	Sevilla	Palma
--:-- CEST (UTC+2)				Stadium: Ono Estadi

20 April 2008 33	Murcia	1–4	Mallorca	Murcia
--:-- CEST (UTC+2)				Stadium: Mestalla

27 April 2008 34	Mallorca	3–1	Racing Santander	Palma
--:-- CEST (UTC+2)				Stadium: Ono Estadi

4 May 2008 35	Athletic Bilbao	1–2	Mallorca	Bilbao
--:-- CEST (UTC+2)				Stadium: Mestalla

7 May 2008 36	Mallorca	2–1	Osasuna	Palma
--:-- CEST (UTC+2)				Stadium: Ono Estadi

11 May 2008 37	Barcelona	2–3	Mallorca	Barcelona
--:-- CEST (UTC+2)				Stadium: Camp Nou

18 May 2008 38	Mallorca	3–2	Zaragoza	Palma
--:-- CEST (UTC+2)				Stadium: Ono Estadi

=== Copa del Rey ===
==== Round of 32 ====
12 December 2007 First leg	Osasuna	2–0	Mallorca	Pamplona
--:-- CEST (UTC+2)				Stadium: El Sadar

2 January 2008 Second leg	Mallorca	4–0 (4–2 agg.)	Osasuna	Palma
--:-- CEST (UTC+2)				Stadium: Ono Estadi

==== Round of 16 ====
10 January 2008 First leg	Mallorca	2–1	Real Madrid	Palma
--:-- CEST (UTC+2)				Stadium: Ono Estadi

16 January 2008 Second leg	Real Madrid	0–1 (1–3 agg.)	Mallorca	Madrid
--:-- CEST (UTC+2)				Stadium: Santiago Bernabéu

==== Quarter-finals ====
23 January 2008 First leg	Getafe	1–0	Mallorca	Getafe
--:-- CEST (UTC+2)				Stadium: Coliseum Alfonso Pérez

30 January 2008 Second leg	Mallorca	2–1 (2 (a)–2 agg.)	Getafe	Palma
--:-- CEST (UTC+2)				Stadium: Ono Estadi
