= Nuria Bermúdez =

Spanish FIFA-certified football agent

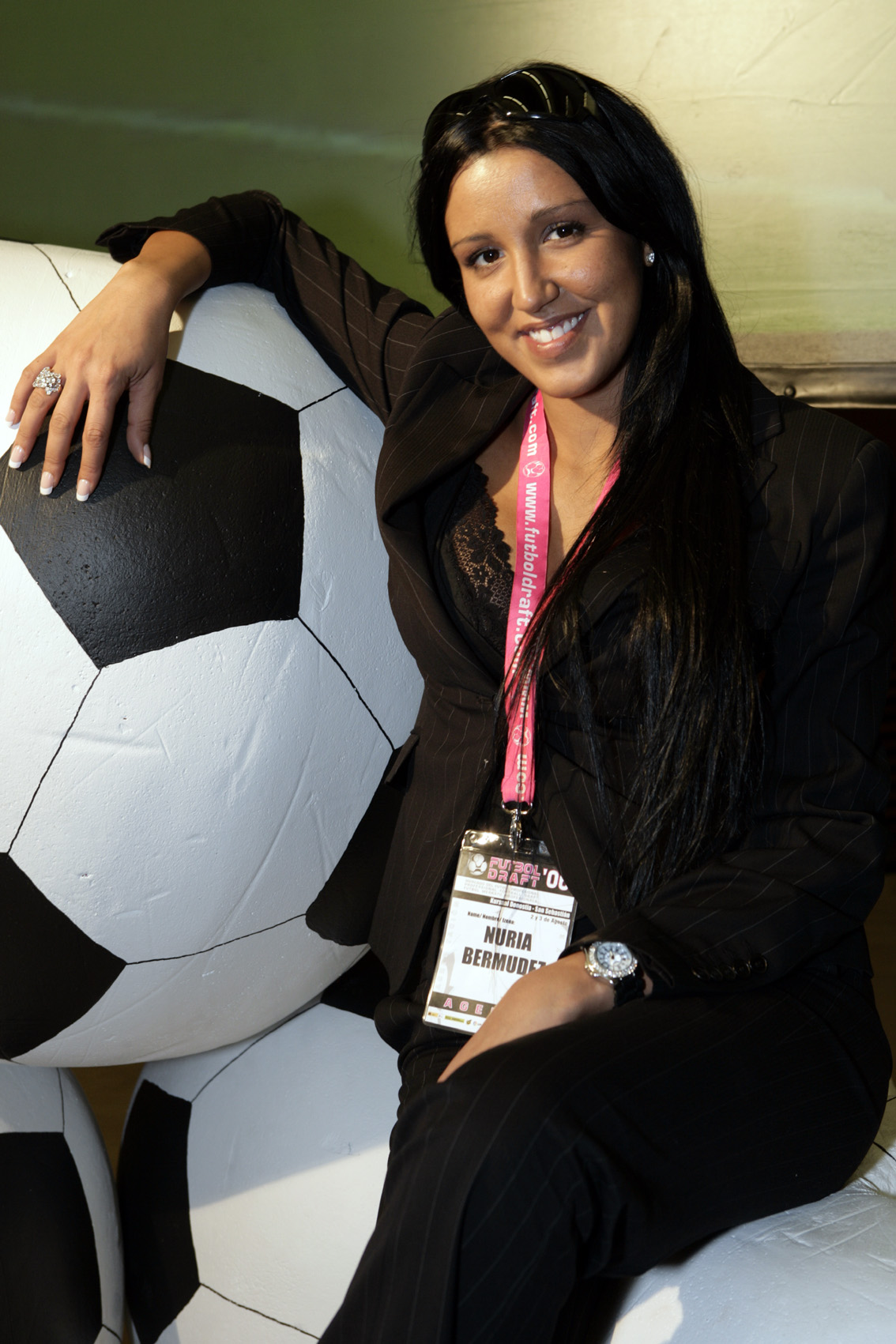
- Bermúdez in 2006
- Born: Nuria Bermúdez Antona; 12 January 1981 (age 45); Madrid, Spain

Nuria Bermúdez Antona (born 12 January 1980) is a Spanish FIFA-certified football agent. She became famous for revealing her personal life to the public, and by appearing nude on multiple occasions in magazines and on television. She also is famous for her relationship with Spanish footballer Dani Güiza.

== Early years ==
Born to a father who was in the Spanish military and a mother who was a nurse, Bermúdez started off her showbiz career at age 11, when she appeared in Teresa Rabal's TV programme La Guardería on Antena 3. By the time she was 15, she was a regular on Madrid's clubbing scene, and was soon dating various celebrities, the first being Antonio David Flores, the former Civil Guard and husband of singer and actress Rocío Carrasco.

A lifelong Real Madrid fan (she has a tattoo of the Real Madrid emblem on her midriff), Bermúdez famously claimed that she had slept with at least six first-team players, including David Beckham. Bermúdez repeatedly turned up at his Santa Mauro hotel. Bermúdez also claimed that she had been exchanging raunchy texts with Beckham, asking for £12,000 for the full story. "Details" of their "relationship" were then shaken off by biographer Andrew Morton.

She was sued by Portugal and Real Madrid player Luís Figo, after stating, during a TV chatshow in 2002, that she had seen Figo double-dating. She lost the case in 2004, although Figo decided not to take the matter further following a public apology by Bermúdez.

== Acting appearance ==
In 2004, Bermúdez played the part of Maria la Fácil in a comedy directed by David Gordon and written by Coto Matamoros, called Plauto, recuerdo distorsionado de un tonto eventual.

== Computer virus ==
In 2004, a mass-mailing worm known as Tasin.C (aka W32/Anzae) promising naked pictures of Bermúdez caused problems among computer users. The suspected creator of the worm was subsequently arrested in Écija.

== FIFA football agent and relationship with Güiza ==
In 2006, Bermúdez sat for the qualifications to become an official FIFA football agent, which she passed scoring 29 points, just five below the top. She also obtained the highest score for a female football agent in Spain.

It was shortly after then that she met her future husband Dani Güiza, who at the time was playing for Getafe CF, having joined from Ciudad de Murcia for €800,000. To the surprise of then Getafe coach Bernd Schuster, Bermúdez turned Güiza around, stating: "Ever since Dani's been with Nuria, he turns up to training and it doesn't look like he's slept under a bridge".

Bermúdez brokered a €5,000,000 move to RCD Mallorca, where he became pichichi (top goalscorer in the first division) in 2007–08, and the first Spaniard to win it since the 2001–02.

With many big name clubs looking to sign Güiza in the summer of 2008, including Valencia CF, FC Barcelona, Arsenal, Internazionale, A.C. Milan, A.S. Roma, and Manchester City, she was asked whether Real Madrid would sign him. She replied in an interview that they would not because "Real Madrid only like stars and won't buy someone from a humble background." She continued, "They prefer to pay 50 million for a player with a name more like Güizinho" Eventually, Güiza ended up being signed to Fenerbahçe.

On 1 December 2007, Bermúdez gave birth to Güiza's son, also named Daniel, at Policlínica Miramar in Palma de Mallorca.
