= Linghems SK =

Swedish football club

- Full name: Linghems Sportklubb
- Ground: Lingheden; Linghem; Sweden
- Chairman: Gunnar Gustafsson
- League: Division 4 Östergötland Östra
Home colours	Away colours

Linghems SK is a Swedish football club located in Linghem.

== Background ==
Linghems SK currently plays in Division 3 Östergötland Östra which is the sixth tier of Swedish football. They play their home matches at the Lingheden in Linghem.

The club is affiliated to Östergötlands Fotbollförbund.

== Season to season ==
Season	Level	Division	Section	Position	Movements
1999	Tier 5	Division 4	Östergötland Västra	5th	
2000	Tier 5	Division 4	Östergötland Västra	6th	
2001	Tier 5	Division 4	Östergötland Östra	11th	Relegated
2002	Tier 6	Division 5	Östergötland Mellersta	3rd	
2003	Tier 6	Division 5	Östergötland Mellersta	2nd	Promoted
2004	Tier 5	Division 4	Östergötland Västra	7th	
2005	Tier 5	Division 4	Östergötland Västra	9th	
2006*	Tier 6	Division 4	Östergötland Östra	11th	Relegated
2007	Tier 7	Division 5	Östergötland Mellersta	4th	
2008	Tier 7	Division 5	Östergötland Mellersta	1st	Promoted
2009	Tier 6	Division 4	Östergötland Östra	3rd	
2010	Tier 6	Division 4	Östergötland Östra	10th	
2011	Tier 6	Division 4	Östergötland Östra		
2012	Tier 6	Division 4	Östergötland Östra	1st	Promoted

* League restructuring in 2006 resulted in a new division being created at Tier 3 and subsequent divisions dropping a level.
