= Kelechi Iheanacho (footballer, born 1981) =

Nigerian footballer (born 1981)

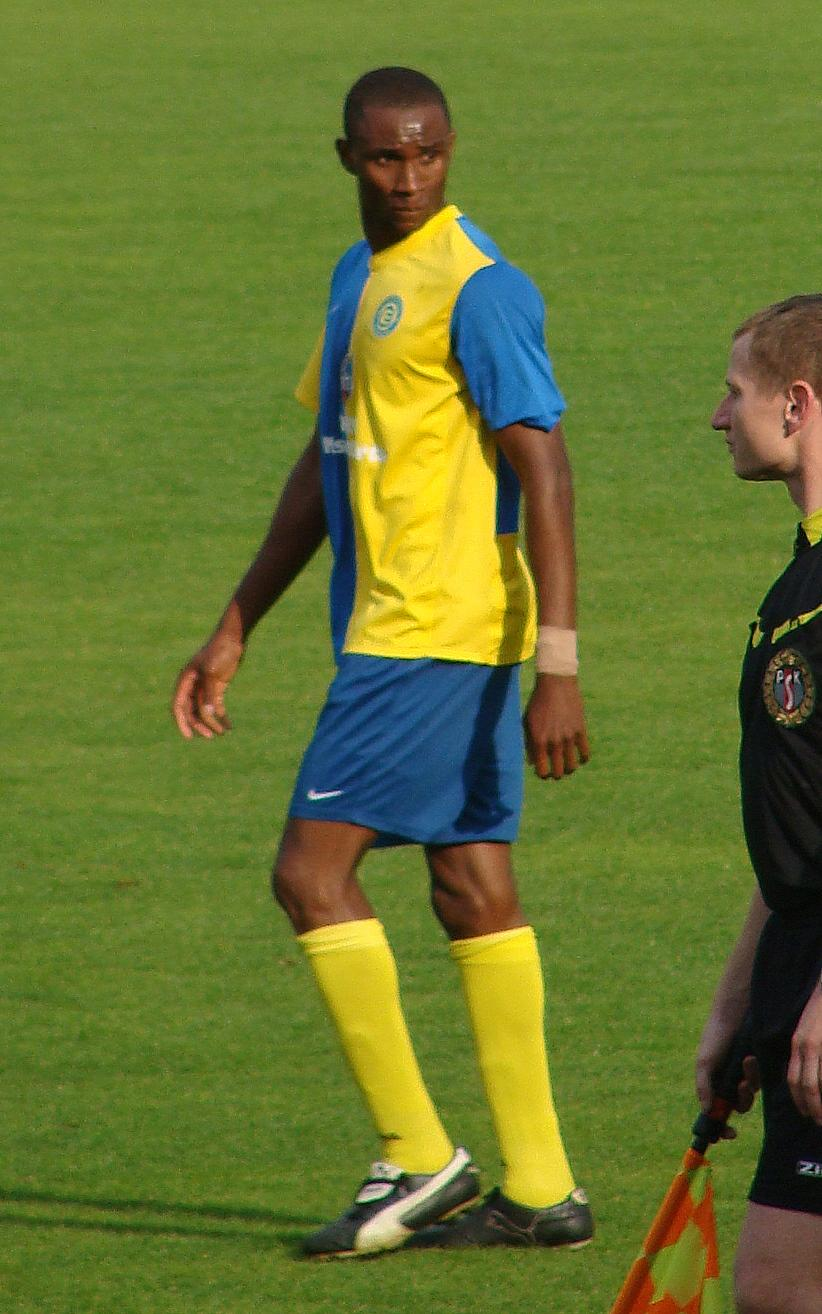
- Iheanacho playing for Elana Toruń in 2011

Personal information
- Full name: Kelechi Zeal Iheanacho
- Date of birth: 12 July 1981 (age 45)
- Place of birth: Aba, Nigeria
- Height: 1.86 m (6 ft 1 in)
- Position: Forward

Senior career*
Years	Team	Apps	(Gls)
1998–1999	Enyimba		
1999	Julius Berger	0	(0)
1999–2005	Wisła Kraków	14	(1)
2000	→ Wawel Kraków (loan)		
2001–2002	→ Orlen Płock (loan)	15	(2)
2002	→ Stomil Olsztyn (loan)	9	(1)
2005	Drwęca Nowe Miasto Lubawskie	17	(7)
2006–2007	Widzew Łódź	10	(0)
2007	Vasas	0	(0)
2008	KSZO Ostrowiec Świętokrzyski	30	(15)
2010	Sokół Aleksandrów Łódzki	8	(3)
2010–2011	Elana Toruń	45	(7)
- * Club domestic league appearances and goals

Kelechi Zeal Iheanacho (born 12 July 1981) is a Nigerian former professional footballer who played as a forward. He spent most of his career in Poland, whilst also having spells in Nigeria and Hungary.

== Honours ==
Wisła Kraków

- Ekstraklasa: 2000–01, 2003–04, 2004–05
- Polish League Cup: 2000–01

Widzew Łódź

- II liga: 2005–06

KSZO Ostrowiec

- II liga East: 2008–09
