= Israel Cohen (footballer) =

Israeli footballer

Personal information
- Full name: Israel Cohen
- Date of birth: December 16, 1971 (age 54)
- Place of birth: Lod, Israel
- Position: Centre-back

Team information
- Current team: F.C. Ramla

Senior career*
Years	Team	Apps	(Gls)
1990–1993	Hapoel Ramat Gan		
1994–1996	Hapoel Petah Tikva		
1996–1997	Maccabi Herzliya		
1997–2000	Hapoel Tel Aviv		
2000–2001	Beitar Jerusalem	25	(0)
2001–2002	Hapoel Haifa	16	(0)
2002–2003	Maccabi Kafr Kanna		
2003–2004	Hapoel Ironi Rishon LeZion		
2004–2007	Hapoel Maxim Lod		
2007–2010	Hapoel Orthodoxim Lod	53	(7)
2010–2011	Hapoel Modi'in	19	(3)
2019–2021	Maccabi Kiryat Ekron	11	(1)
2021–	F.C. Ramla	0	(0)
- * Club domestic league appearances and goals

Israel Cohen (Hebrew: ישראל כהן) is a former Israeli footballer, who in 2002 (while playing for Hapoel Haifa) was suspected of match fixing.

Cohen currently plays amateur basketball with Hapoel Modi'in in Liga Bet (the 5th tier).

== Honours ==
- Israeli Premier League (1):
  - 1999-00
- Israel State Cup (1):
  - 2000
- Liga Gimel (Center) (2):
  - 2004-05, 2007–08
- Liga Bet (South) (1):
  - 2005-06
- Liga Alef (South) (1):
  - 2006-07
