= Roman Jůn =

Czech footballer

Personal information
- Full name: Roman Jůn
- Date of birth: 5 January 1976 (age 50)
- Place of birth: Czech Republic
- Height: 1.89 m (6 ft 2 in)
- Position: Midfielder

Senior career*
Years	Team	Apps	(Gls)
1995–1997	Pardubice		
1997–1998	Bohemians 1905		
1998	Mladá Boleslav		
1999	Bohemians 1905		
2000–2002	Slovan Liberec		
2002–2003	České Budějovice		
2003–2006	Hradec Králové		
- * Club domestic league appearances and goals as of 5 November 2012 (UTC)

Roman Jůn (born 5 January 1976 in Czech Republic) is a retired Czech football midfielder. During his career, Jun has played for Pardubice, Bohemians 1905, FK Mladá Boleslav, Slovan Liberec, České Budějovice and Hradec Králové.

== Honours ==
Slovan Liberec

- Czech Cup: 1999–2000
